= List of Nashville Predators seasons =

The Nashville Predators are a professional ice hockey team based in Nashville, Tennessee. The team is a member of the Central Division of the Western Conference of the National Hockey League (NHL). Since their inception in 1998, the Predators have reached the Stanley Cup Final once in 2017.

== Table key ==
Key of colors and symbols
Color/symbol	Explanation
†	Stanley Cup champions
‡	Conference champions
↑	Division champions
#	Led league in points

Key of terms and abbreviations
Term or abbreviation	Definition
Finish	Final position in division or league standings
GP	Number of games played
W	Number of wins
L	Number of losses
T	Number of ties
OT	Number of losses in overtime (since the 1999–2000 season)
Pts	Number of points
GF	Goals for (goals scored by the Predators)
GA	Goals against (goals scored by the Predators' opponents)
—	Does not apply

== Year by year ==
Season	Predators season	Conference	Division	Regular season									Postseason					
Season	Predators season	Conference	Division	Finish	GP	W	L	T	OT	Pts	GF	GA	GP	W	L	GF	GA	Result
1998–99	1998–99	Western	Central	4th	82	28	47	7	—	63	190	261	—	—	—	—	—	Did not qualify
1999–00	1999–00	Western	Central	4th	82	28	40	7	7	70	199	240	—	—	—	—	—	Did not qualify
2000–01	2000–01	Western	Central	3rd	82	34	36	9	3	80	186	200	—	—	—	—	—	Did not qualify
2001–02	2001–02	Western	Central	4th	82	28	41	13	0	69	196	230	—	—	—	—	—	Did not qualify
2002–03	2002–03	Western	Central	4th	82	27	35	13	7	74	183	206	—	—	—	—	—	Did not qualify
2003–04	2003–04	Western	Central	3rd	82	38	29	11	4	91	216	217	6	2	4	9	12	Lost in conference quarterfinals (Red Wings), 2–4
2004–05^{1}	2004–05	Season cancelled due to 2004–05 NHL lockout																
2005–06^{2}	2005–06	Western	Central	2nd	82	49	25	—	8	106	259	227	5	1	4	10	17	Lost in conference quarterfinals (Sharks), 1–4
2006–07	2006–07	Western	Central	2nd	82	51	23	—	8	110	272	212	5	1	4	14	16	Lost in conference quarterfinals (Sharks), 1–4
2007–08	2007–08	Western	Central	2nd	82	41	32	—	9	91	227	224	6	2	4	12	17	Lost in conference quarterfinals (Red Wings), 2–4
2008–09	2008–09	Western	Central	5th	82	40	34	—	8	88	213	223	—	—	—	—	—	Did not qualify
2009–10	2009–10	Western	Central	3rd	82	47	29	—	6	100	225	225	6	2	4	15	17	Lost in conference quarterfinals (Blackhawks), 2–4
2010–11	2010–11	Western	Central	2nd	82	44	27	—	11	99	219	194	12	6	6	33	34	Won in conference quarterfinals (Ducks), 4–2; Lost in conference semifinals (Canucks), 2–4
2011–12	2011–12	Western	Central	2nd	82	48	26	—	8	104	237	210	10	5	5	22	21	Won in conference quarterfinals (Red Wings), 4–1; Lost in conference semifinals (Coyotes), 1–4
2012–13^{3}	2012–13	Western	Central	5th	48	16	23	—	9	41	111	139	—	—	—	—	—	Did not qualify
2013–14	2013–14	Western	Central	6th	82	38	32	—	12	88	216	242	—	—	—	—	—	Did not qualify
2014–15	2014–15	Western	Central	2nd	82	47	25	—	10	104	232	208	6	2	4	21	19	Lost in first round (Blackhawks), 2–4
2015–16	2015–16	Western	Central	4th	82	41	27	—	14	96	228	215	14	7	7	31	43	Won in first round (Ducks), 4–3; Lost in second round (Sharks), 3–4
2016–17	2016–17	Western‡	Central	4th	82	41	29	—	12	94	240	224	22	14	8	60	48	Won in first round (Blackhawks), 4–0; Won in second round (Blues), 4–2; Won in conference finals (Ducks), 4–2; Lost in Stanley Cup Final (Penguins), 2–4
2017–18	2017–18	Western	Central↑	1st	82	53	18	—	11	117#	267	211	13	7	6	41	42	Won in first round (Avalanche), 4–2; Lost in second round (Jets), 3–4
2018–19	2018–19	Western	Central↑	1st	82	47	29	—	6	100	240	214	6	2	4	12	18	Lost in first round (Stars), 2–4
2019–20^{4}	2019–20	Western	Central	4th	69	35	26	—	8	78	215	217	4	1	3	11	14	Lost in qualifying round (Coyotes), 1–3
2020–21^{5}	2020–21	—	Central	4th	56	31	23	—	2	64	156	154	6	2	4	16	22	Lost in first round (Hurricanes), 2–4
2021–22	2021–22	Western	Central	5th	82	45	30	—	7	97	266	252	4	0	4	9	21	Lost in first round (Avalanche), 0–4
2022–23	2022–23	Western	Central	5th	82	42	32	—	8	92	229	238	—	—	—	—	—	Did not qualify
2023–24	2023–24	Western	Central	4th	82	47	30	—	5	99	269	248	6	2	4	12	13	Lost in first round (Canucks), 2–4
2024–25	2024–25	Western	Central	7th	82	30	44	—	8	68	214	274	—	—	—	—	—	Did not qualify
2025–26	2025–26	Western	Central	6th	82	38	34	—	10	86	247	269	—	—	—	—	—	Did not qualify
Totals					2,141	1,054	826	303	201	2,369	5,955	5,989	131	56	75	328	374	16 playoff appearances

^{1} Season was cancelled due to the 2004–05 NHL lockout.
^{2} As of the 2005–06 NHL season, all games tied after regulation will be decided in a shootout; SOL (Shootout losses) will be recorded as OTL in the standings.
^{3} The 2012–13 NHL season was shortened due to the 2012–13 NHL lockout.
^{4} The 2019–20 NHL season was suspended on March 12, 2020 due to the COVID-19 pandemic.
^{5} Due to the effects of the COVID-19 pandemic, the 2020–21 NHL season was shortened to 56 games.

=== All-time records ===
Statistic	GP	W	L	T	OT
Regular season record (1998–present)	2,059	1,016	792	60	191
Postseason record (1998–present)	131	56	75	—	—
All-time regular and postseason record	2,190	1,072	867	60	191
All-time series record: 7–16
