= 2000–01 Los Angeles Kings season =

National Hockey League team season

2000–01 Los Angeles Kings
- Division: 3rd Pacific
- Conference: 7th Western
- 2000–01 record: 38–28–13–3
- Home record: 20–12–8–1
- Road record: 18–16–5–2
- Goals for: 252
- Goals against: 228

Team information
- General manager: Dave Taylor
- Coach: Andy Murray
- Captain: Rob Blake (Oct.–Feb.); Mattias Norstrom (Mar.–Apr.)
- Alternate captains: Mattias Norstrom (Oct.–Mar.); Luc Robitaille; Kelly Buchberger (Mar.–Apr.)
- Arena: Staples Center
- Average attendance: 16,057
- Minor league affiliates: Lowell Lock Monsters; Mississippi Sea Wolves

Team leaders
- Goals: Zigmund Palffy (38)
- Assists: Zigmund Palffy (51); Luc Robitaille (51)
- Points: Zigmund Palffy (89)
- Penalty minutes: Stu Grimson (235)
- Plus/minus: Zigmund Palffy (+22)
- Wins: Jamie Storr (19)
- Goals against average: Felix Potvin (1.96)

The 2000–01 Los Angeles Kings season was the Kings' 34th season in the National Hockey League (NHL). The club made it to the playoffs, defeating Detroit in the first round before losing to Colorado in the second round.

== Regular season ==
=== Final standings ===
Pacific Division
No.	CR		GP	W	L	T	OTL	GF	GA	Pts
1	3	**Dallas Stars**	82	48	24	8	2	241	187	106
2	5	**San Jose Sharks**	82	40	27	12	3	217	192	95
3	7	**Los Angeles Kings**	82	38	28	13	3	252	228	92
4	9	Phoenix Coyotes	82	35	27	17	3	214	212	90
5	15	Mighty Ducks of Anaheim	82	25	41	11	5	188	245	66

Note: CR = Conference rank; GP = Games played; W = Wins; L = Losses; T = Ties; OTL = Overtime loss; GF = Goals for; GA = Goals against; Pts = Points
Bolded teams qualified for the playoffs.

Western Conference
R		Div	GP	W	L	T	OTL	GF	GA	Pts
**1**	**p – Colorado Avalanche**	**NW**	**82**	**52**	**16**	**10**	**4**	**270**	**192**	**118**
**2**	**y – Detroit Red Wings**	**CEN**	**82**	**49**	**20**	**9**	**4**	**253**	**202**	**111**
**3**	**y – Dallas Stars**	**PAC**	**82**	**48**	**24**	**8**	**2**	**241**	**187**	**106**
**4**	**St. Louis Blues**	**CEN**	**82**	**43**	**22**	**12**	**5**	**249**	**195**	**103**
**5**	**San Jose Sharks**	**PAC**	**82**	**40**	**27**	**12**	**3**	**217**	**192**	**95**
**6**	**Edmonton Oilers**	**NW**	**82**	**39**	**28**	**12**	**3**	**243**	**222**	**93**
**7**	**Los Angeles Kings**	**PAC**	**82**	**38**	**28**	**13**	**3**	**252**	**228**	**92**
**8**	**Vancouver Canucks**	**NW**	**82**	**36**	**28**	**11**	**7**	**239**	**238**	**90**
8.5
9	Phoenix Coyotes	PAC	82	35	27	17	3	214	212	90
10	Nashville Predators	CEN	82	34	36	9	3	186	200	80
11	Calgary Flames	NW	82	27	36	15	4	197	236	73
12	Chicago Blackhawks	CEN	82	29	40	8	5	210	246	71
13	Columbus Blue Jackets	CEN	82	28	39	9	6	190	233	71
14	Minnesota Wild	NW	82	25	39	13	5	168	210	68
15	Mighty Ducks of Anaheim	PAC	82	25	41	11	5	188	245	66

Divisions: CEN – Central, PAC – Pacific, NW – Northwest

bold – Qualified for playoffs; p – Won Presidents' Trophy; y – Won division

== Playoffs ==
The Kings beat the Detroit Red Wings four games to two in the first round after being down 0–2. This was LA's first playoff series win since defeating the Toronto Maple Leafs in the 1993 Campbell Conference Finals. However, they would lose to former captain Rob Blake and the Colorado Avalanche in seven games in the second round, as Colorado would go on to win the 2001 Stanley Cup.

== Schedule and results ==
=== Regular season ===
2000–01 regular season
October: 5–6–2–0 (home: 2–1–1–0; road: 3–5–1–0)

Game	Date	Score	Opponent	Record	Recap
1	October 6, 2000	4–1	@ Washington Capitals (2000–01)	1–0–0–0	W
2	October 7, 2000	3–5	@ Buffalo Sabres (2000–01)	1–1–0–0	L
3	October 9, 2000	7–1	@ Columbus Blue Jackets (2000–01)	2–1–0–0	W
4	October 11, 2000	4–4 OT	St. Louis Blues (2000–01)	2–1–1–0	T
5	October 13, 2000	5–0	Boston Bruins (2000–01)	3–1–1–0	W
6	October 15, 2000	5–6	Phoenix Coyotes (2000–01)	3–2–1–0	L
7	October 17, 2000	1–1 OT	@ Nashville Predators (2000–01)	3–2–2–0	T
8	October 19, 2000	1–7	@ St. Louis Blues (2000–01)	3–3–2–0	L
9	October 21, 2000	3–4	@ Dallas Stars (2000–01)	3–4–2–0	L
10	October 23, 2000	5–4 OT	@ Mighty Ducks of Anaheim (2000–01)	4–4–2–0	W
11	October 25, 2000	6–2	Mighty Ducks of Anaheim (2000–01)	5–4–2–0	W
12	October 28, 2000	1–3	@ Phoenix Coyotes (2000–01)	5–5–2–0	L
13	October 31, 2000	1–4	@ Columbus Blue Jackets (2000–01)	5–6–2–0	L

November: 6–2–4–0 (home: 3–1–2–0; road: 3–1–2–0)

Game	Date	Score	Opponent	Record	Recap
14	November 2, 2000	5–2	@ Atlanta Thrashers (2000–01)	6–6–2–0	W
15	November 4, 2000	2–1	@ New Jersey Devils (2000–01)	7–6–2–0	W
16	November 5, 2000	4–1	@ New York Islanders (2000–01)	8–6–2–0	W
17	November 7, 2000	3–3 OT	Phoenix Coyotes (2000–01)	8–6–3–0	T
18	November 9, 2000	2–0	Vancouver Canucks (2000–01)	9–6–3–0	W
19	November 11, 2000	2–2 OT	Detroit Red Wings (2000–01)	9–6–4–0	T
20	November 16, 2000	5–1	New York Islanders (2000–01)	10–6–4–0	W
21	November 18, 2000	6–4	Colorado Avalanche (2000–01)	11–6–4–0	W
22	November 23, 2000	1–6	New Jersey Devils (2000–01)	11–7–4–0	L
23	November 25, 2000	2–2 OT	@ Pittsburgh Penguins (2000–01)	11–7–5–0	T
24	November 26, 2000	4–4 OT	@ Boston Bruins (2000–01)	11–7–6–0	T
25	November 28, 2000	6–7	@ New York Rangers (2000–01)	11–8–6–0	L

December: 6–6–1–1 (home: 2–2–1–1; road: 4–4–0–0)

Game	Date	Score	Opponent	Record	Recap
26	December 2, 2000	3–2	Minnesota Wild (2000–01)	12–8–6–0	W
27	December 3, 2000	0–4	@ Mighty Ducks of Anaheim (2000–01)	12–9–6–0	L
28	December 7, 2000	5–2	Dallas Stars (2000–01)	13–9–6–0	W
29	December 9, 2000	4–2	@ Edmonton Oilers (2000–01)	14–9–6–0	W
30	December 10, 2000	2–1	@ Vancouver Canucks (2000–01)	15–9–6–0	W
31	December 14, 2000	5–5 OT	New York Rangers (2000–01)	15–9–7–0	T
32	December 16, 2000	3–4	Tampa Bay Lightning (2000–01)	15–10–7–0	L
33	December 19, 2000	6–7 OT	Atlanta Thrashers (2000–01)	15–10–7–1	OTL
34	December 21, 2000	2–5	@ Colorado Avalanche (2000–01)	15–11–7–1	L
35	December 22, 2000	3–4	@ Minnesota Wild (2000–01)	15–12–7–1	L
36	December 26, 2000	1–2	San Jose Sharks (2000–01)	15–13–7–1	L
37	December 28, 2000	5–2	@ St. Louis Blues (2000–01)	16–13–7–1	W
38	December 29, 2000	4–1	@ Dallas Stars (2000–01)	17–13–7–1	W
39	December 31, 2000	1–2	@ Detroit Red Wings (2000–01)	17–14–7–1	L

January: 6–6–0–0 (home: 3–4–0–0; road: 3–2–0–0)

Game	Date	Score	Opponent	Record	Recap
40	January 2, 2001	2–6	@ Colorado Avalanche (2000–01)	17–15–7–1	L
41	January 4, 2001	3–4	Florida Panthers (2000–01)	17–16–7–1	L
42	January 6, 2001	5–0	Calgary Flames (2000–01)	18–16–7–1	W
43	January 11, 2001	3–2	Buffalo Sabres (2000–01)	19–16–7–1	W
44	January 13, 2001	2–4	St. Louis Blues (2000–01)	19–17–7–1	L
45	January 16, 2001	7–6 OT	@ Ottawa Senators (2000–01)	20–17–7–1	W
46	January 17, 2001	2–1	@ Toronto Maple Leafs (2000–01)	21–17–7–1	W
47	January 20, 2001	6–3	@ Carolina Hurricanes (2000–01)	22–17–7–1	W
48	January 22, 2001	0–3	@ Philadelphia Flyers (2000–01)	22–18–7–1	L
49	January 25, 2001	0–3	Calgary Flames (2000–01)	22–19–7–1	L
50	January 27, 2001	1–4	Minnesota Wild (2000–01)	22–20–7–1	L
51	January 30, 2001	8–0	Dallas Stars (2000–01)	23–20–7–1	W

February: 5–6–1–0 (home: 2–3–1–0; road: 3–3–0–0)

Game	Date	Score	Opponent	Record	Recap
52	February 1, 2001	4–6	Nashville Predators (2000–01)	23–21–7–1	L
53	February 6, 2001	3–3 OT	Chicago Blackhawks (2000–01)	23–21–8–1	T
54	February 8, 2001	4–2	Carolina Hurricanes (2000–01)	24–21–8–1	W
55	February 10, 2001	3–4	Washington Capitals (2000–01)	24–22–8–1	L
56	February 12, 2001	3–6	Edmonton Oilers (2000–01)	24–23–8–1	L
57	February 14, 2001	2–4	@ Dallas Stars (2000–01)	24–24–8–1	L
58	February 16, 2001	4–0	@ Minnesota Wild (2000–01)	25–24–8–1	W
59	February 18, 2001	0–3	@ Chicago Blackhawks (2000–01)	25–25–8–1	L
60	February 20, 2001	0–5	@ Edmonton Oilers (2000–01)	25–26–8–1	L
61	February 22, 2001	2–0	@ Calgary Flames (2000–01)	26–26–8–1	W
62	February 24, 2001	3–1	Columbus Blue Jackets (2000–01)	27–26–8–1	W
63	February 27, 2001	2–1	@ Nashville Predators (2000–01)	28–26–8–1	W

March: 8–2–4–1 (home: 7–1–3–0; road: 1–1–1–1)

Game	Date	Score	Opponent	Record	Recap
64	March 1, 2001	2–2 OT	@ Chicago Blackhawks (2000–01)	28–26–9–1	T
65	March 3, 2001	6–3	Detroit Red Wings (2000–01)	29–26–9–1	W
66	March 4, 2001	0–4	@ Mighty Ducks of Anaheim (2000–01)	29–27–9–1	L
67	March 6, 2001	4–3	Montreal Canadiens (2000–01)	30–27–9–1	W
68	March 8, 2001	4–1	Nashville Predators (2000–01)	31–27–9–1	W
69	March 10, 2001	2–2 OT	Chicago Blackhawks (2000–01)	31–27–10–1	T
70	March 14, 2001	4–1	@ San Jose Sharks (2000–01)	32–27–10–1	W
71	March 17, 2001	1–0 OT	San Jose Sharks (2000–01)	33–27–10–1	W
72	March 19, 2001	6–2	Phoenix Coyotes (2000–01)	34–27–10–1	W
73	March 21, 2001	0–7	Edmonton Oilers (2000–01)	34–28–10–1	L
74	March 24, 2001	3–3 OT	Mighty Ducks of Anaheim (2000–01)	34–28–11–1	T
75	March 26, 2001	0–0 OT	San Jose Sharks (2000–01)	34–28–12–1	T
76	March 27, 2001	2–3 OT	@ San Jose Sharks (2000–01)	34–28–12–2	OTL
77	March 29, 2001	3–0	Columbus Blue Jackets (2000–01)	35–28–12–2	W
78	March 31, 2001	4–0	Colorado Avalanche (2000–01)	36–28–12–2	W

April: 2–0–1–1 (home: 1–0–0–0; road: 1–0–1–1)

Game	Date	Score	Opponent	Record	Recap
79	April 2, 2001	3–1	Vancouver Canucks (2000–01)	37–28–12–2	W
80	April 3, 2001	2–2 OT	@ Phoenix Coyotes (2000–01)	37–28–13–2	T
81	April 5, 2001	2–3 OT	@ Vancouver Canucks (2000–01)	37–28–13–3	OTL
82	April 7, 2001	3–2	@ Calgary Flames (2000–01)	38–28–13–3	W

Legend: W Win (2 points) L Loss (0 points) T Tie (1 point) OTL Overtime loss (1 point)

=== Playoffs ===
2001 Stanley Cup playoffs
Western Conference Quarterfinals vs. (2) Detroit Red Wings — Kings win 4–2

Game	Date	Score	Opponent	Series	Recap
1	April 11, 2001	3–5	@ Detroit Red Wings	Red Wings lead 1–0	L
2	April 14, 2001	0–4	@ Detroit Red Wings	Red Wings lead 2–0	L
3	April 15, 2001	2–1	Detroit Red Wings	Red Wings lead 2–1	W
4	April 18, 2001	4–3 OT	Detroit Red Wings	Series tied 2–2	W
5	April 21, 2001	3–2	@ Detroit Red Wings	Kings lead 3–2	W
6	April 23, 2001	3–2 OT	Detroit Red Wings	Kings win 4–2	W

Western Conference Semifinals vs. (1) Colorado Avalanche – Avalanche win 4–3

Game	Date	Score	Opponent	Series	Recap
1	April 26, 2001	4–3 OT	@ Colorado Avalanche	Kings lead 1–0	W
2	April 28, 2001	0–2	@ Colorado Avalanche	Series tied 1–1	L
3	April 30, 2001	3–4	Colorado Avalanche	Avalanche lead 2–1	L
4	May 2, 2001	0–3	Colorado Avalanche	Avalanche lead 3–1	L
5	May 4, 2001	1–0	@ Colorado Avalanche	Avalanche lead 3–2	W
6	May 6, 2001	1–0 2OT	Colorado Avalanche	Series tied 3–3	W
7	May 8, 2001	1–5	@ Colorado Avalanche	Avalanche win 4–3	L

Legend: W Win L Loss

== Player statistics ==
=== Scoring ===
- Position abbreviations: C = Center; D = Defense; G = Goaltender; LW = Left wing; RW = Right wing
- † = Joined team via a transaction (e.g., trade, waivers, signing) during the season. Stats reflect time with the Kings only.
- ‡ = Left team via a transaction (e.g., trade, waivers, release) during the season. Stats reflect time with the Kings only.

No.	Player	Pos	Regular season						Playoffs					
No.	Player	Pos	GP	G	A	Pts	+/-	PIM	GP	G	A	Pts	+/-	PIM
33	Zigmund Palffy	RW	73	38	51	89	22	20	13	3	5	8	0	8
20	Luc Robitaille	LW	82	37	51	88	10	66	13	4	3	7	1	10
21	Bryan Smolinski	C	78	27	32	59	10	40	13	1	5	6	−1	14
15	Jozef Stumpel	C	63	16	39	55	20	14	13	3	5	8	1	10
10	Mathieu Schneider	D	73	16	35	51	0	56	13	0	9	9	4	10
4	Rob Blake‡	D	54	17	32	49	−8	69	—	—	—	—	—	—
27	Glen Murray	RW	64	18	21	39	9	32	13	4	3	7	−1	4
17 (Note: Visnovsky wore number 24 through January 6.)	Lubomir Visnovsky	D	81	7	32	39	16	36	8	0	0	0	−1	0
28	Steve Reinprecht‡	C	59	12	17	29	11	12	—	—	—	—	—	—
7	Nelson Emerson	RW	78	11	11	22	−13	54	13	2	2	4	1	4
25	Eric Belanger	C	62	9	12	21	14	16	13	1	4	5	3	2
9	Kelly Buchberger	RW	82	6	14	20	−10	75	8	1	0	1	−1	2
44	Jaroslav Modry	D	63	4	15	19	16	48	10	1	0	1	−1	4
22	Ian Laperriere	RW	79	8	10	18	5	141	13	1	2	3	1	12
14	Mattias Norstrom	D	82	0	18	18	10	60	13	0	2	2	−4	18
19	Bob Corkum‡	C	58	4	6	10	−12	18	—	—	—	—	—	—
23	Craig Johnson	LW	26	4	5	9	0	16	—	—	—	—	—	—
8	Jere Karalahti	D	56	2	7	9	8	38	13	0	0	0	−7	18
28	Adam Deadmarsh†	RW	18	4	2	6	3	4	13	3	3	6	0	4
43	Philippe Boucher	D	22	2	4	6	4	20	13	0	1	1	1	2
32	Stu Grimson	LW	72	3	2	5	−2	235	5	0	0	0	0	4
3	Aaron Miller†	D	13	0	5	5	3	14	13	0	1	1	4	6
51	Scott Thomas	RW	24	3	1	4	0	9	12	1	0	1	−1	4
11	Jason Blake‡	C	17	1	3	4	−8	10	—	—	—	—	—	—
17	Tomas Vlasak‡	C	10	1	3	4	4	2	—	—	—	—	—	—
5	Aki Berg‡	D	47	0	4	4	3	43	—	—	—	—	—	—
39	Felix Potvin†	G	23	0	3	3		2	13	0	0	0		4
29	Brad Chartrand	C	4	1	0	1	−2	2	—	—	—	—	—	—
11	Steve Kelly†	C	11	1	0	1	0	4	8	0	0	0	−1	2
12	Marko Tuomainen†	RW	11	0	1	1	1	4	—	—	—	—	—	—
26	Rich Brennan	D	2	0	0	0	−3	0	—	—	—	—	—	—
35	Stephane Fiset	G	7	0	0	0		2	1	0	0	0		0
6	Andreas Lilja	D	2	0	0	0	−2	4	1	0	0	0	0	0
24	Adam Mair†	C	10	0	0	0	−3	6	—	—	—	—	—	—
31	Steve Passmore‡	G	14	0	0	0		0	—	—	—	—	—	—
45	Travis Scott	G	1	0	0	0		0	—	—	—	—	—	—
1	Jamie Storr	G	45	0	0	0		4	—	—	—	—	—	—

=== Goaltending ===
- † = Joined team via a transaction (e.g., trade, waivers, signing) during the season. Stats reflect time with the Kings only.
- ‡ = Left team via a transaction (e.g., trade, waivers, release) during the season. Stats reflect time with the Kings only.

No.	Player	Regular season										Playoffs								
No.	Player	GP	W	L	T	SA	GA	GAA	SV%	SO	TOI	GP	W	L	SA	GA	GAA	SV%	SO	TOI
1	Jamie Storr	45	19	18	6	1131	114	2.74	.899	4	2498	—	—	—	—	—	—	—	—	—
39	Felix Potvin†	23	13	5	5	571	46	1.96	.919	5	1410	13	7	6	361	33	2.44	.909	2	812
35	Stephane Fiset	7	3	0	1	129	19	3.58	.853	0	318	1	0	0	0	0	0.00		0	1
31	Steve Passmore‡	14	3	8	1	310	37	3.09	.881	1	718	—	—	—	—	—	—	—	—	—
45	Travis Scott	1	0	0	0	10	3	7.20	.700	0	25	—	—	—	—	—	—	—	—	—

== Awards and records ==
=== Awards ===
Type	Award/honor	Recipient	Ref
League (annual)	NHL All-Rookie Team	Lubomir Visnovsky (Defense)	
League (annual)	NHL Second All-Star Team	Rob Blake (Defense)	
League (annual)	NHL Second All-Star Team	Luc Robitaille (Left wing)	
League (in-season)	NHL All-Star Game selection	Rob Blake	
League (in-season)	NHL All-Star Game selection	Zigmund Palffy	
League (in-season)	NHL All-Star Game selection	Luc Robitaille	
League (in-season)	NHL Player of the Week	Felix Potvin (April 2)	
Team	Best Newcomer	Lubomir Visnovsky	
Team	Bill Libby Memorial Award	Luc Robitaille	
Team	Defensive Player	Mattias Norstrom	
Team	Jim Fox Community Service	Kelly Buchberger	
Team	Jim Fox Community Service	Stu Grimson	
Team	Leading Scorer	Zigmund Palffy	
Team	Most Inspirational	Ian Laperriere	
Team	Most Popular Player	Ian Laperriere	
Team	Outstanding Defenseman	Mattias Norstrom	
Team	Unsung Hero	Jaroslav Modry	

=== Milestones ===
Milestone	Player	Date	Ref
First game	Eric Belanger	October 6, 2000	
First game	Lubomir Visnovsky	October 6, 2000	
First game	Tomas Vlasak	October 17, 2000	
First game	Travis Scott	November 28, 2000	
First game	Andreas Lilja	December 3, 2000	
600th assist	Luc Robitaille	October 7, 2000	

== Transactions ==
The Kings were involved in the following transactions from June 11, 2000, the day after the deciding game of the 2000 Stanley Cup Final, through June 9, 2001, the day of the deciding game of the 2001 Stanley Cup Final.

=== Trades ===
Date	Details		Ref
June 25, 2000	To Los Angeles Kings: 4th-round pick in 2000	To Ottawa Senators: 5th-round pick in 2000; 5th-round pick in 2000	
June 25, 2000	To Los Angeles Kings: Tampa Bay’s 7th-round pick in 2000; Calgary’s 7th-round pick in 2000	To Washington Capitals: 5th-round pick in 2000	
January 3, 2001	To Los Angeles Kings: Conditional draft pick in 2002 (Note: 5th-round pick.)	To New York Islanders: Jason Blake	
February 15, 2001	To Los Angeles Kings: Felix Potvin	To Vancouver Canucks: Future considerations (Note: 3rd-round pick in 2002.)	
February 21, 2001	To Los Angeles Kings: Adam Deadmarsh; Aaron Miller; 1st-round pick in 2001; Conditional draft pick (Note: 1st-round pick in 2003, contingent on Blake re-signing with the Avalanche, which he did on July 1, 2001.); A prospect to be named later (Note: Colorado sent the rights to Jared Aulin on March 22.)	To Colorado Avalanche: Rob Blake; Steven Reinprecht	
February 23, 2001	To Los Angeles Kings: Future considerations	To New Jersey Devils: Bob Corkum	
February 27, 2001	To Los Angeles Kings: Steve Kelly	To New Jersey Devils: Future considerations	
February 28, 2001	To Los Angeles Kings: 8th-round pick in 2001	To Chicago Blackhawks: Steve Passmore	
March 13, 2001	To Los Angeles Kings: Adam Mair; 2nd-round pick in 2001	To Toronto Maple Leafs: Aki Berg	

=== Players acquired ===
Date	Player	Former team	Term	Via	Ref
July 6, 2000	Stu Grimson	Anaheim Mighty Ducks	1-year	Free agency	
August 11, 2000	Peter Leboutillier	Anaheim Mighty Ducks		Free agency	
August 11, 2000	Nate Miller	University of Minnesota (WCHA)		Free agency	
August 13, 2000	Mathieu Schneider	Columbus Blue Jackets	1-year	Free agency	
January 3, 2001	Marko Tuomainen	Lowell Lock Monsters (AHL)	1-year	Free agency	

=== Players lost ===
Date	Player	New team	Via (Note: In parentheses is the player's free agency group on July 1 if applicable.)	Ref
N/A	Mike O'Neill	Sheffield Steelers (BISL)	Free agency (VI)	
June 23, 2000	Steve McKenna	Minnesota Wild	Expansion draft	
June 23, 2000	Sean O'Donnell	Minnesota Wild	Expansion draft	
July 1, 2000	Nathan LaFayette (Note: LaFayette retired.)		Contract expiration (UFA)	
July 13, 2000	Dan Bylsma	Anaheim Mighty Ducks	Free agency (UFA)	
July 25, 2000	Craig Charron	Rochester Americans (AHL)	Free agency (II)	
August 11, 2000	David MacIsaac	San Jose Sharks	Free agency (VI)	
August 28, 2000	Pavel Rosa	HPK (Liiga)	Free agency (Note: Los Angeles retained Rosa’s NHL rights and re-signed him on July 16, 2002.)	
September 11, 2000	Allan Egeland	Pensacola Ice Pilots (ECHL)	Free agency (VI)	
September 13, 2000	Garry Galley	New York Islanders	Free agency (III)	
September 29, 2000	Jason Podollan	Tampa Bay Lightning	Waiver draft	
October 3, 2000	Marko Tuomainen	Lowell Lock Monsters (AHL)	Free agency (VI)	
December 5, 2000	Tomas Vlasak	HPK (Liiga) (Note: Vlasak signed with HPK on December 7.)	Release	

=== Signings ===
Date	Player	Term	Contract type	Ref
June 12, 2000	Tomas Vlasak		Entry-level	
June 27, 2000	Bob Corkum	1-year	Option exercised	
June 28, 2000	Craig Johnson	multi-year	Re-signing	
July 5, 2000	Jere Karalahti	multi-year	Re-signing	
July 15, 2000	Rich Brennan		Re-signing	
July 15, 2000	Andreas Lilja		Entry-level	
July 15, 2000	Lubomir Visnovsky		Entry-level	
July 31, 2000	Aki Berg	1-year	Re-signing	
July 31, 2000	Brad Chartrand	multi-year	Re-signing	
July 31, 2000	Marcel Cousineau	1-year	Re-signing	
August 1, 2000	Eric Belanger	1-year	Re-signing	
August 1, 2000	Philippe Boucher	1-year	Re-signing	
August 1, 2000	Jason Podollan	1-year	Re-signing	
August 2, 2000	Ian Laperriere	multi-year	Re-signing	
August 14, 2000	Bryan Smolinski	1-year	Re-signing	
October 18, 2000	Jozef Stumpel	3-year	Re-signing	
June 7, 2001	Glen Murray	1-year	Option exercised	

== Draft picks ==
Los Angeles's draft picks at the 2000 NHL entry draft held at the Pengrowth Saddledome in Calgary, Alberta.

Round	#	Player	Nationality	College/Junior/Club team (League)
1	20	Alexander Frolov	Russia	Lokomotiv Yaroslavl (Russia)
2	54	Andreas Lilja	Sweden	MIF Redhawks (Sweden)
3	86	Yanick Lehoux	Canada	Baie-Comeau Drakkar (QMJHL)
4	118	Lubomir Visnovsky	Slovakia	Slovan Bratislava (Slovakia)
5	165	Nathan Marsters	Canada	Chilliwack Chiefs (BCJHL)
7	201	Yevgeni Fyodorov	Russia	Molot Perm (Russia)
7	206	Tim Eriksson	Sweden	Frolunda HC (Sweden)
7	218	Craig Olynick	Canada	Seattle Thunderbirds (WHL)
8	245	Dan Welch	United States	University of Minnesota (WCHA)
8	250	Flavien Conne	Switzerland	HC Fribourg-Gotteron (Switzerland)
9	282	Carl Grahn	Finland	KalPa Jr. (Finland)

== See also ==
- 2000–01 NHL season
