= 2000–01 Chicago Blackhawks season =

National Hockey League team season

2000–01 Chicago Blackhawks
- Division: 4th Central
- Conference: 12th Western
- 2000–01 record: 29–40–8–5
- Home record: 14–21–4–2
- Road record: 15–19–4–3
- Goals for: 210
- Goals against: 246

Team information
- General manager: Mike Smith
- Coach: Alpo Suhonen
- Captain: Tony Amonte
- Arena: United Center
- Average attendance: 14,996 (73.2%)
- Minor league affiliate: Norfolk Admirals

Team leaders
- Goals: Tony Amonte (35)
- Assists: Steve Sullivan (41)
- Points: Steve Sullivan (75)
- Penalty minutes: Ryan VandenBussche (146)
- Plus/minus: Jamie Allison (+7); Michael Nylander (+7); Jaroslav Spacek (+7)
- Wins: Jocelyn Thibault (27)
- Goals against average: Jocelyn Thibault (2.81)

The 2000–01 Chicago Blackhawks season was the team's 75th season of operation. Finishing 12th in the Western Conference, they did not qualify for the 2001 Stanley Cup playoffs.

== Off-season ==
Alpo Suhonen was hired as the Blackhawks new head coach on May 22. Mike Smith was named general manager on September 22. Forward Tony Amonte was named captain on September 30.

== Regular season ==
=== Final standings ===
Central Division
No.	CR		GP	W	L	T	OTL	GF	GA	Pts
1	2	**Detroit Red Wings**	82	49	20	9	4	253	202	111
2	4	**St. Louis Blues**	82	43	22	12	5	249	195	103
3	10	Nashville Predators	82	34	36	9	3	186	200	80
4	12	Chicago Blackhawks	82	29	40	8	5	210	246	71
5	13	Columbus Blue Jackets	82	28	39	9	6	190	233	71

Note: CR = Conference rank; GP = Games played; W = Wins; L = Losses; T = Ties; OTL = Overtime loss; GF = Goals for; GA = Goals against; Pts = Points
Bolded teams qualified for the playoffs.

Western Conference
R		Div	GP	W	L	T	OTL	GF	GA	Pts
**1**	**p – Colorado Avalanche**	**NW**	**82**	**52**	**16**	**10**	**4**	**270**	**192**	**118**
**2**	**y – Detroit Red Wings**	**CEN**	**82**	**49**	**20**	**9**	**4**	**253**	**202**	**111**
**3**	**y – Dallas Stars**	**PAC**	**82**	**48**	**24**	**8**	**2**	**241**	**187**	**106**
**4**	**St. Louis Blues**	**CEN**	**82**	**43**	**22**	**12**	**5**	**249**	**195**	**103**
**5**	**San Jose Sharks**	**PAC**	**82**	**40**	**27**	**12**	**3**	**217**	**192**	**95**
**6**	**Edmonton Oilers**	**NW**	**82**	**39**	**28**	**12**	**3**	**243**	**222**	**93**
**7**	**Los Angeles Kings**	**PAC**	**82**	**38**	**28**	**13**	**3**	**252**	**228**	**92**
**8**	**Vancouver Canucks**	**NW**	**82**	**36**	**28**	**11**	**7**	**239**	**238**	**90**
8.5
9	Phoenix Coyotes	PAC	82	35	27	17	3	214	212	90
10	Nashville Predators	CEN	82	34	36	9	3	186	200	80
11	Calgary Flames	NW	82	27	36	15	4	197	236	73
12	Chicago Blackhawks	CEN	82	29	40	8	5	210	246	71
13	Columbus Blue Jackets	CEN	82	28	39	9	6	190	233	71
14	Minnesota Wild	NW	82	25	39	13	5	168	210	68
15	Mighty Ducks of Anaheim	PAC	82	25	41	11	5	188	245	66

Divisions: CEN – Central, PAC – Pacific, NW – Northwest

bold – Qualified for playoffs; p – Won Presidents' Trophy; y – Won division

== Schedule and results ==
2000–01 regular season
October: 3–7–0–1 (home: 1–5–0–0; road: 2–2–0–1)

Game	Date	Score	Opponent	Record	Recap
1	October 5, 2000	2–4	@ Buffalo Sabres (2000–01)	0–1–0–0	L
2	October 7, 2000	5–3	@ Columbus Blue Jackets (2000–01)	1–1–0–0	W
3	October 12, 2000	0–4	Detroit Red Wings (2000–01)	1–2–0–0	L
4	October 14, 2000	4–5 OT	@ Montreal Canadiens (2000–01)	1–2–0–1	OTL
5	October 15, 2000	2–1	Columbus Blue Jackets (2000–01)	2–2–0–1	W
6	October 18, 2000	2–4	New York Rangers (2000–01)	2–3–0–1	L
7	October 20, 2000	1–5	Dallas Stars (2000–01)	2–4–0–1	L
8	October 21, 2000	0–1	@ St. Louis Blues (2000–01)	2–5–0–1	L
9	October 26, 2000	0–2	Colorado Avalanche (2000–01)	2–6–0–1	L
10	October 28, 2000	1–3	Buffalo Sabres (2000–01)	2–7–0–1	L
11	October 29, 2000	3–2	@ Minnesota Wild (2000–01)	3–7–0–1	W

November: 5–6–2–1 (home: 1–2–0–1; road: 4–4–2–0)

Game	Date	Score	Opponent	Record	Recap
12	November 2, 2000	4–5	@ Boston Bruins (2000–01)	3–8–0–1	L
13	November 3, 2000	6–1	@ Detroit Red Wings (2000–01)	4–8–0–1	W
14	November 5, 2000	4–2	Mighty Ducks of Anaheim (2000–01)	5–8–0–1	W
15	November 8, 2000	2–3 OT	San Jose Sharks (2000–01)	5–8–0–2	OTL
16	November 10, 2000	2–5	Minnesota Wild (2000–01)	5–9–0–2	L
17	November 11, 2000	3–3 OT	@ Toronto Maple Leafs (2000–01)	5–9–1–2	T
18	November 14, 2000	2–4	@ Vancouver Canucks (2000–01)	5–10–1–2	L
19	November 16, 2000	5–2	@ Calgary Flames (2000–01)	6–10–1–2	W
20	November 17, 2000	3–3 OT	@ Edmonton Oilers (2000–01)	6–10–2–2	T
21	November 21, 2000	4–1	@ Phoenix Coyotes (2000–01)	7–10–2–2	W
22	November 22, 2000	1–4	@ San Jose Sharks (2000–01)	7–11–2–2	L
23	November 24, 2000	0–2	@ Minnesota Wild (2000–01)	7–12–2–2	L
24	November 27, 2000	6–5 OT	@ Detroit Red Wings (2000–01)	8–12–2–2	W
25	November 30, 2000	0–3	Nashville Predators (2000–01)	8–13–2–2	L

December: 6–6–1–0 (home: 3–2–1–0; road: 3–4–0–0)

Game	Date	Score	Opponent	Record	Recap
26	December 1, 2000	2–1	@ Nashville Predators (2000–01)	9–13–2–2	W
27	December 3, 2000	5–0	Columbus Blue Jackets (2000–01)	10–13–2–2	W
28	December 7, 2000	2–4	Minnesota Wild (2000–01)	10–14–2–2	L
29	December 9, 2000	4–6	@ St. Louis Blues (2000–01)	10–15–2–2	L
30	December 10, 2000	1–6	St. Louis Blues (2000–01)	10–16–2–2	L
31	December 13, 2000	1–3	@ Atlanta Thrashers (2000–01)	10–17–2–2	L
32	December 15, 2000	1–4	@ Dallas Stars (2000–01)	10–18–2–2	L
33	December 16, 2000	3–0	@ Nashville Predators (2000–01)	11–18–2–2	W
34	December 21, 2000	6–4	Vancouver Canucks (2000–01)	12–18–2–2	W
35	December 23, 2000	3–2	@ Ottawa Senators (2000–01)	13–18–2–2	W
36	December 27, 2000	1–1 OT	Phoenix Coyotes (2000–01)	13–18–3–2	T
37	December 29, 2000	3–2 OT	Detroit Red Wings (2000–01)	14–18–3–2	W
38	December 31, 2000	1–2	@ Carolina Hurricanes (2000–01)	14–19–3–2	L

January: 7–5–1–0 (home: 4–3–1–0; road: 3–2–0–0)

Game	Date	Score	Opponent	Record	Recap
39	January 3, 2001	6–0	Vancouver Canucks (2000–01)	15–19–3–2	W
40	January 5, 2001	1–2	Edmonton Oilers (2000–01)	15–20–3–2	L
41	January 7, 2001	7–4	Tampa Bay Lightning (2000–01)	16–20–3–2	W
42	January 9, 2001	6–3	@ New York Islanders (2000–01)	17–20–3–2	W
43	January 12, 2001	3–1	@ Columbus Blue Jackets (2000–01)	18–20–3–2	W
44	January 14, 2001	2–2 OT	Colorado Avalanche (2000–01)	18–20–4–2	T
45	January 17, 2001	5–0	Florida Panthers (2000–01)	19–20–4–2	W
46	January 19, 2001	3–1	Washington Capitals (2000–01)	20–20–4–2	W
47	January 21, 2001	0–4	Pittsburgh Penguins (2000–01)	20–21–4–2	L
48	January 25, 2001	1–5	Philadelphia Flyers (2000–01)	20–22–4–2	L
49	January 26, 2001	2–5	@ Colorado Avalanche (2000–01)	20–23–4–2	L
50	January 28, 2001	6–2	@ Vancouver Canucks (2000–01)	21–23–4–2	W
51	January 31, 2001	2–3	@ Edmonton Oilers (2000–01)	21–24–4–2	L

February: 6–5–1–1 (home: 4–2–0–0; road: 2–3–1–1)

Game	Date	Score	Opponent	Record	Recap
52	February 1, 2001	3–5	@ Calgary Flames (2000–01)	21–25–4–2	L
53	February 6, 2001	3–3 OT	@ Los Angeles Kings (2000–01)	21–25–5–2	T
54	February 7, 2001	3–2	@ Mighty Ducks of Anaheim (2000–01)	22–25–5–2	W
55	February 10, 2001	2–3 OT	@ San Jose Sharks (2000–01)	22–25–5–3	OTL
56	February 11, 2001	2–3	@ Phoenix Coyotes (2000–01)	22–26–5–3	L
57	February 14, 2001	0–7	San Jose Sharks (2000–01)	22–27–5–3	L
58	February 16, 2001	6–2	St. Louis Blues (2000–01)	23–27–5–3	W
59	February 18, 2001	3–0	Los Angeles Kings (2000–01)	24–27–5–3	W
60	February 19, 2001	2–4	@ New York Rangers (2000–01)	24–28–5–3	L
61	February 21, 2001	3–7	Detroit Red Wings (2000–01)	24–29–5–3	L
62	February 23, 2001	1–0	Atlanta Thrashers (2000–01)	25–29–5–3	W
63	February 25, 2001	6–4	Toronto Maple Leafs (2000–01)	26–29–5–3	W
64	February 27, 2001	3–2	@ Washington Capitals (2000–01)	27–29–5–3	W

March: 2–8–2–1 (home: 1–5–1–1; road: 1–3–1–0)

Game	Date	Score	Opponent	Record	Recap
65	March 1, 2001	2–2 OT	Los Angeles Kings (2000–01)	27–29–6–3	T
66	March 4, 2001	3–6	Carolina Hurricanes (2000–01)	27–30–6–3	L
67	March 7, 2001	4–1	@ Dallas Stars (2000–01)	28–30–6–3	W
68	March 9, 2001	1–3	@ Mighty Ducks of Anaheim (2000–01)	28–31–6–3	L
69	March 10, 2001	2–2 OT	@ Los Angeles Kings (2000–01)	28–31–7–3	T
70	March 13, 2001	0–3	Dallas Stars (2000–01)	28–32–7–3	L
71	March 15, 2001	3–2	Nashville Predators (2000–01)	29–32–7–3	W
72	March 18, 2001	1–4	Mighty Ducks of Anaheim (2000–01)	29–33–7–3	L
73	March 22, 2001	1–2 OT	Nashville Predators (2000–01)	29–33–7–4	OTL
74	March 24, 2001	1–5	@ St. Louis Blues (2000–01)	29–34–7–4	L
75	March 25, 2001	1–3	Calgary Flames (2000–01)	29–35–7–4	L
76	March 28, 2001	2–5	Ottawa Senators (2000–01)	29–36–7–4	L
77	March 29, 2001	2–5	@ Pittsburgh Penguins (2000–01)	29–37–7–4	L

April: 0–3–1–1 (home: 0–2–1–0; road: 0–1–0–1)

Game	Date	Score	Opponent	Record	Recap
78	April 1, 2001	3–3 OT	Edmonton Oilers (2000–01)	29–37–8–4	T
79	April 2, 2001	3–4	@ New Jersey Devils (2000–01)	29–38–8–4	L
80	April 4, 2001	2–5	Calgary Flames (2000–01)	29–39–8–4	L
81	April 6, 2001	0–1	Toronto Maple Leafs (2000–01)	29–40–8–4	L
82	April 8, 2001	3–4 OT	@ Columbus Blue Jackets (2000–01)	29–40–8–5	OTL

Legend: W Win (2 points) L Loss (0 points) T Tie (1 point) OTL Overtime loss (1 point)

== Player statistics ==
=== Scoring ===
- Position abbreviations: C = Center; D = Defense; G = Goaltender; LW = Left wing; RW = Right wing
- † = Joined team via a transaction (e.g., trade, waivers, signing) during the season. Stats reflect time with the Blackhawks only.
- ‡ = Left team via a transaction (e.g., trade, waivers, release) during the season. Stats reflect time with the Blackhawks only.

No.	Player	Pos	Regular season					
No.	Player	Pos	GP	G	A	Pts	+/-	PIM
26	Steve Sullivan	RW	81	34	41	75	3	54
10	Tony Amonte	RW	82	35	29	64	−22	54
92	Michael Nylander	C	82	25	39	64	7	32
55	Eric Daze	RW	79	33	24	57	1	16
13	Alex Zhamnov	C	63	13	36	49	−12	40
19	Dean McAmmond‡	C	61	10	16	26	4	43
36	Chris Herperger	C	61	10	15	25	0	20
3	Jaroslav Spacek†	D	50	5	18	23	7	20
2	Boris Mironov	D	66	5	17	22	−14	42
24	Bob Probert	LW	79	7	12	19	−13	103
4	Stephane Quintal	D	72	1	18	19	−9	60
22	Kyle Calder	LW	43	5	10	15	−4	14
25 (Note: Karpovtsev wore number 52 in his first three games.)	Alexander Karpovtsev	D	53	2	13	15	−4	39
6	Kevin Dean	D	69	0	11	11	−16	30
16	Steve Dubinsky	C	60	6	4	10	−4	33
23	Jean-Yves Leroux	LW	59	4	4	8	−9	22
29	Valeri Zelepukin	LW	36	3	4	7	−14	18
14	Ryan VandenBussche	RW	64	2	5	7	−8	146
39	Chris McAlpine	D	50	0	6	6	5	32
8	Anders Eriksson‡	D	13	2	3	5	−4	2
42	Steve Poapst	D	36	2	3	5	3	12
5	Steve McCarthy	D	44	0	5	5	−7	8
17	Reto Von Arx	C	19	3	1	4	−4	4
33	Jamie Allison	D	44	1	3	4	7	53
15	Blair Atcheynum	RW	19	1	2	3	−7	2
11	Josef Marha	C	15	0	3	3	−4	6
41	Jocelyn Thibault	G	66	0	3	3		2
12 (Note: King wore number 16 in his first two games.)	Kris King†‡	LW	13	1	0	1	−3	8
28	Mark Bell	C	13	0	1	1	0	4
40	Casey Hankinson	LW	11	0	1	1	−3	9
38	Nolan Baumgartner	D	8	0	0	0	−4	6
49	Aaron Downey	RW	3	0	0	0	−1	6
20	Mark Janssens	C	28	0	0	0	−8	33
30	Michel Larocque	G	3	0	0	0		0
37	Steve Passmore†	G	6	0	0	0		4
32	Rob Tallas	G	12	0	0	0		0

=== Goaltending ===
- † = Joined team via a transaction (e.g., trade, waivers, signing) during the season. Stats reflect time with the Blackhawks only.

No.	Player	Regular season									
No.	Player	GP	W	L	T	SA	GA	GAA	SV%	SO	TOI
41	Jocelyn Thibault	66	27	32	7	1711	180	2.81	.895	6	3844
32	Rob Tallas	12	2	7	0	265	35	3.35	.868	0	627
30	Michel Larocque	3	0	2	0	59	9	3.55	.847	0	152
37	Steve Passmore†	6	0	4	1	147	14	2.47	.905	0	340

== Awards and records ==
=== Awards ===
Type	Award/honor	Recipient	Ref
League (in-season)	NHL All-Star Game selection	Tony Amonte	
League (in-season)	NHL Player of the Week	Michael Nylander (January 8)	

=== Milestones ===
Milestone	Player	Date	Ref
First game	Reto von Arx	October 5, 2000	
First game	Mark Bell	December 13, 2000	
First game	Michel Larocque	January 25, 2001	
First game	Casey Hankinson	March 13, 2001	

== Transactions ==
The Blackhawks were involved in the following transactions from June 11, 2000, the day after the deciding game of the 2000 Stanley Cup Final, through June 9, 2001, the day of the deciding game of the 2001 Stanley Cup Final.

=== Trades ===
Date	Details		Ref
June 12, 2000	To Chicago Blackhawks: 9th-round pick in 2000	To Philadelphia Flyers: Mark Janssens	
June 24, 2000	To Chicago Blackhawks: 2nd-round pick in 2000	To San Jose Sharks: 2nd-round pick in 2000; 3rd-round pick in 2000	
June 25, 2000	To Chicago Blackhawks: 9th-round pick in 2000	To Atlanta Thrashers: Rights to Ben Simon	
June 25, 2000	To Chicago Blackhawks: Los Angeles' 5th-round pick in 2000; 6th-round pick in 2000	To Washington Capitals: Toronto's 4th-round pick in 2000	
July 21, 2000	To Chicago Blackhawks: Nolan Baumgartner	To Washington Capitals: Remi Royer	
August 11, 2000	To Chicago Blackhawks: Future considerations	To Dallas Stars: Rights to David Ling	
October 2, 2000	To Chicago Blackhawks: Alexander Karpovtsev; 4th-round pick in 2001	To Toronto Maple Leafs: Bryan McCabe	
October 5, 2000	To Chicago Blackhawks: Future considerations (Note: The Rangers agreed to place Stephane Quintal on waivers.)	To New York Rangers: Brad Brown; Michal Grosek	
November 6, 2000	To Chicago Blackhawks: Jaroslav Spacek	To Florida Panthers: Anders Eriksson	
February 28, 2001	To Chicago Blackhawks: Steve Passmore	To Los Angeles Kings: 8th-round pick in 2001	
March 13, 2001	To Chicago Blackhawks: 3rd-round pick in 2001	To Philadelphia Flyers: Dean McAmmond	

=== Players acquired ===
Date	Player	Former team	Term	Via	Ref
July 6, 2000	Mark Janssens	Philadelphia Flyers		Waivers	
July 18, 2000	Valeri Zelepukin	Philadelphia Flyers		Free agency	
July 27, 2000	Chris McAlpine	Atlanta Thrashers		Free agency	
July 27, 2000	Steve Poapst	Washington Capitals		Free agency	
July 31, 2000	Rob Tallas	Boston Bruins		Free agency	
August 14, 2000	Aaron Downey	Boston Bruins		Free agency	
August 25, 2000	Steve Dubinsky	Calgary Flames		Free agency	
October 5, 2000	Stephane Quintal	New York Rangers		Waivers	
October 9, 2000	Kris King	Toronto Maple Leafs		Free agency	

=== Players lost ===
Date	Player	New team	Via (Note: In parentheses is the player's free agency group on July 1 if applicable.)	Ref
N/A	Jeff Christian	Krefeld Pinguine (DEL)	Free agency (VI)	
June 23, 2000	Radim Bicanek	Columbus Blue Jackets	Expansion draft	
June 23, 2000	Jeff Daw	Minnesota Wild	Expansion draft	
July 21, 2000	Todd Rohloff	Washington Capitals	Free agency (VI)	
July 26, 2000	Derek Plante	Philadelphia Flyers	Free agency (UFA)	
July 27, 2000	Dallas Eakins	Calgary Flames	Free agency (UFA)	
July 29, 2000	Ted Crowley	Kassel Huskies (DEL)	Free agency (VI)	
September 2000	Marc Lamothe	Syracuse Crunch (AHL)	Free agency (VI)	
September 2000	Eddie Olczyk		Retirement (III)	
October 2000	Doug Zmolek	Chicago Wolves (IHL) (Note: Zmolek signed with the Wolves on December 28.)	Buyout	
December 3, 2000	Kris King		Retirement	

=== Signings ===
Date	Player	Term	Contract type	Ref
June 14, 2000	Ryan VandenBussche		Re-signing	
June 27, 2000	Kevin Dean	3-year	Re-signing	
July 7, 2000	Chris Herperger		Re-signing	
July 12, 2000	Arne Ramholt		Entry-level	
July 17, 2000	Michael Nylander		Re-signing	
July 17, 2000	Reto von Arx		Entry-level	
July 24, 2000	Michal Grosek		Re-signing	
July 27, 2000	Casey Hankinson		Re-signing	
July 27, 2000	Dean McAmmond		Re-signing	
July 27, 2000	Marty Wilford		Re-signing	
July 31, 2000	Nolan Baumgartner		Re-signing	
August 4, 2000	Nathan Perrott		Re-signing	
August 4, 2000	Michael Souza		Entry-level	
August 14, 2000	Bryan McCabe	1-year	Arbitration award	
August 15, 2000	Anders Eriksson	1-year	Arbitration award	
September 15, 2000	Nathan Perrott		Re-signing	
February 15, 2001	Steve Sullivan	3-year	Extension	
June 1, 2001	Michael Leighton		Entry-level	

== Draft picks ==
Chicago's draft picks at the 2000 NHL entry draft held at the Pengrowth Saddledome in Calgary, Alberta.

Round	#	Player	Nationality	College/Junior/Club team (League)
1	10	Mikhail Yakubov	Russia	Lada Togliatti (Russia)
1	11	Pavel Vorobiev	Russia	Lokomotiv Yaroslavl (Russia)
2	49	Jonas Nordquist	Sweden	Leksands IF (Sweden)
3	74	Igor Radulov	Russia	Lokomotiv Yaroslavl (Russia)
4	106	Scotty Balan	Canada	Regina Pats (WHL)
4	117	Olli Malmivaara	Finland	Jokerit Jr. (Finland)
5	151	Alexander Barkunov	Russia	Lokomotiv Yaroslavl (Russia)
6	177	Mike Ayers	United States	Dubuque Fighting Saints (USHL)
6	193	Joey Martin	United States	Omaha Lancers (USHL)
7	207	Cliff Loya	United States	University of Maine (NCAA)
7	225	Vladislav Luchkin	Russia	Severstal Cherepovets (Russia)
8	240	Adam Berkhoel	United States	St. Paul Vulcans (USHL)
9	262	Peter Flache	Canada	Guelph Storm (OHL)
9	271	Reto Von Arx	Switzerland	HC Davos (Switzerland)
9	291	Arne Ramholt	Switzerland	Kloten Flyers (Switzerland)

== See also ==
- 2000–01 NHL season
