= 2000–01 Detroit Red Wings season =

National Hockey League team season

2000–01 Detroit Red Wings
- Central Division champions
- Division: 1st Central
- Conference: 2nd Western
- 2000–01 record: 49–20–9–4
- Home record: 27–9–3–2
- Road record: 22–11–6–2
- Goals for: 253
- Goals against: 202

Team information
- General manager: Ken Holland
- Coach: Scotty Bowman
- Captain: Steve Yzerman
- Alternate captains: Nicklas Lidstrom; Brendan Shanahan
- Arena: Joe Louis Arena
- Average attendance: 19,995
- Minor league affiliates: Cincinnati Mighty Ducks; Toledo Storm

Team leaders
- Goals: Sergei Fedorov (32)
- Assists: Nicklas Lidstrom (56)
- Points: Brendan Shanahan (76)
- Penalty minutes: Martin Lapointe (127)
- Plus/minus: Kris Draper (17)
- Wins: Chris Osgood (25)
- Goals against average: Manny Legace (2.05)

The 2000–01 Detroit Red Wings season was the 75th season of the Detroit franchise in the National Hockey League (NHL). The Red Wings qualified for the 2001 Stanley Cup playoffs] by finishing first in the Central Division, and second overall in the Western Conference, but the team and much of the hockey world were shocked as their opponent in the first round of the playoffs, the seventh-seeded Los Angeles Kings, defeated them in six games.

== Regular season ==
The Red Wings scored the most power-play goals in the NHL during the regular season, with 85.

On April 1, 2001, Steve Yzerman scored just 11 seconds into the overtime period to give the Wings a 2–1 home win over the Washington Capitals. It would prove to be the fastest overtime goal scored during the 2000–01 regular season.

=== Final standings ===
Central Division
No.	CR		GP	W	L	T	OTL	GF	GA	Pts
1	2	**Detroit Red Wings**	82	49	20	9	4	253	202	111
2	4	**St. Louis Blues**	82	43	22	12	5	249	195	103
3	10	Nashville Predators	82	34	36	9	3	186	200	80
4	12	Chicago Blackhawks	82	29	40	8	5	210	246	71
5	13	Columbus Blue Jackets	82	28	39	9	6	190	233	71

Note: CR = Conference rank; GP = Games played; W = Wins; L = Losses; T = Ties; OTL = Overtime loss; GF = Goals for; GA = Goals against; Pts = Points
Bolded teams qualified for the playoffs.

Western Conference
R		Div	GP	W	L	T	OTL	GF	GA	Pts
**1**	**p – Colorado Avalanche**	**NW**	**82**	**52**	**16**	**10**	**4**	**270**	**192**	**118**
**2**	**y – Detroit Red Wings**	**CEN**	**82**	**49**	**20**	**9**	**4**	**253**	**202**	**111**
**3**	**y – Dallas Stars**	**PAC**	**82**	**48**	**24**	**8**	**2**	**241**	**187**	**106**
**4**	**St. Louis Blues**	**CEN**	**82**	**43**	**22**	**12**	**5**	**249**	**195**	**103**
**5**	**San Jose Sharks**	**PAC**	**82**	**40**	**27**	**12**	**3**	**217**	**192**	**95**
**6**	**Edmonton Oilers**	**NW**	**82**	**39**	**28**	**12**	**3**	**243**	**222**	**93**
**7**	**Los Angeles Kings**	**PAC**	**82**	**38**	**28**	**13**	**3**	**252**	**228**	**92**
**8**	**Vancouver Canucks**	**NW**	**82**	**36**	**28**	**11**	**7**	**239**	**238**	**90**
8.5
9	Phoenix Coyotes	PAC	82	35	27	17	3	214	212	90
10	Nashville Predators	CEN	82	34	36	9	3	186	200	80
11	Calgary Flames	NW	82	27	36	15	4	197	236	73
12	Chicago Blackhawks	CEN	82	29	40	8	5	210	246	71
13	Columbus Blue Jackets	CEN	82	28	39	9	6	190	233	71
14	Minnesota Wild	NW	82	25	39	13	5	168	210	68
15	Mighty Ducks of Anaheim	PAC	82	25	41	11	5	188	245	66

Divisions: CEN – Central, PAC – Pacific, NW – Northwest

bold – Qualified for playoffs; p – Won Presidents' Trophy; y – Won division

== Playoffs ==
The Detroit Red Wings ended the 2000–01 regular season as the Western Conference's second seed and played the seventh-seeded Los Angeles Kings in the Conference Quarterfinals. Detroit was defeated 4 games to 2, despite winning the first two games at home.

== Schedule and results ==
=== Regular season ===
2000–01 regular season
October: 7–4–0–1 (home: 4–2–0–1; road: 3–2–0–0)

Game	Date	Score	Opponent	Record	Recap
1	October 5, 2000	4–3	@ Calgary Flames (2000–01)	1–0–0–0	W
2	October 6, 2000	1–2	@ Edmonton Oilers (2000–01)	1–1–0–0	L
3	October 11, 2000	3–4	Edmonton Oilers (2000–01)	1–2–0–0	L
4	October 12, 2000	4–0	@ Chicago Blackhawks (2000–01)	2–2–0–0	W
5	October 15, 2000	2–4	Calgary Flames (2000–01)	2–3–0–0	L
6	October 17, 2000	2–1	St. Louis Blues (2000–01)	3–3–0–0	W
7	October 19, 2000	1–2 OT	Nashville Predators (2000–01)	3–3–0–1	OTL
8	October 21, 2000	5–4 OT	Buffalo Sabres (2000–01)	4–3–0–1	W
9	October 22, 2000	2–1 OT	@ Columbus Blue Jackets (2000–01)	5–3–0–1	W
10	October 25, 2000	5–1	Tampa Bay Lightning (2000–01)	6–3–0–1	W
11	October 28, 2000	4–1	Columbus Blue Jackets (2000–01)	7–3–0–1	W
12	October 31, 2000	2–6	@ Washington Capitals (2000–01)	7–4–0–1	L

November: 8–4–1–1 (home: 3–3–0–1; road: 5–1–1–0)

Game	Date	Score	Opponent	Record	Recap
13	November 1, 2000	4–2	@ Montreal Canadiens (2000–01)	8–4–0–1	W
14	November 3, 2000	1–6	Chicago Blackhawks (2000–01)	8–5–0–1	L
15	November 8, 2000	4–2	@ Phoenix Coyotes (2000–01)	9–5–0–1	W
16	November 11, 2000	2–2 OT	@ Los Angeles Kings (2000–01)	9–5–1–1	T
17	November 12, 2000	3–2	@ Mighty Ducks of Anaheim (2000–01)	10–5–1–1	W
18	November 15, 2000	4–1	San Jose Sharks (2000–01)	11–5–1–1	W
19	November 17, 2000	0–1	Dallas Stars (2000–01)	11–6–1–1	L
20	November 18, 2000	2–3	@ Nashville Predators (2000–01)	11–7–1–1	L
21	November 20, 2000	6–3	Nashville Predators (2000–01)	12–7–1–1	W
22	November 22, 2000	4–5	Boston Bruins (2000–01)	12–8–1–1	L
23	November 24, 2000	3–2	Vancouver Canucks (2000–01)	13–8–1–1	W
24	November 25, 2000	4–3	@ New York Islanders (2000–01)	14–8–1–1	W
25	November 27, 2000	5–6 OT	Chicago Blackhawks (2000–01)	14–8–1–2	OTL
26	November 29, 2000	6–4	@ Atlanta Thrashers (2000–01)	15–8–1–2	W

December: 7–5–2–1 (home: 4–4–1–0; road: 3–1–1–1)

Game	Date	Score	Opponent	Record	Recap
27	December 1, 2000	3–1	@ Florida Panthers (2000–01)	16–8–1–2	W
28	December 2, 2000	0–3	@ Tampa Bay Lightning (2000–01)	16–9–1–2	L
29	December 6, 2000	0–3	Toronto Maple Leafs (2000–01)	16–10–1–2	L
30	December 8, 2000	5–1	Philadelphia Flyers (2000–01)	17–10–1–2	W
31	December 10, 2000	3–4	Pittsburgh Penguins (2000–01)	17–11–1–2	L
32	December 13, 2000	3–3 OT	Florida Panthers (2000–01)	17–11–2–2	T
33	December 15, 2000	5–3	@ Colorado Avalanche (2000–01)	18–11–2–2	W
34	December 16, 2000	2–2 OT	@ St. Louis Blues (2000–01)	18–11–3–2	T
35	December 18, 2000	4–3 OT	Edmonton Oilers (2000–01)	19–11–3–2	W
36	December 20, 2000	0–2	San Jose Sharks (2000–01)	19–12–3–2	L
37	December 22, 2000	2–1 OT	Mighty Ducks of Anaheim (2000–01)	20–12–3–2	W
38	December 23, 2000	2–1 OT	@ Boston Bruins (2000–01)	21–12–3–2	W
39	December 27, 2000	3–5	Minnesota Wild (2000–01)	21–13–3–2	L
40	December 29, 2000	2–3 OT	@ Chicago Blackhawks (2000–01)	21–13–3–3	OTL
41	December 31, 2000	2–1	Los Angeles Kings (2000–01)	22–13–3–3	W

January: 8–3–1–1 (home: 4–0–1–0; road: 4–3–0–1)

Game	Date	Score	Opponent	Record	Recap
42	January 4, 2001	4–2	Dallas Stars (2000–01)	23–13–3–3	W
43	January 5, 2001	2–3 OT	@ Minnesota Wild (2000–01)	23–13–3–4	OTL
44	January 7, 2001	4–3 OT	Colorado Avalanche (2000–01)	24–13–3–4	W
45	January 9, 2001	2–2 OT	Phoenix Coyotes (2000–01)	24–13–4–4	T
46	January 12, 2001	3–2	@ Dallas Stars (2000–01)	25–13–4–4	W
47	January 15, 2001	3–2	@ San Jose Sharks (2000–01)	26–13–4–4	W
48	January 16, 2001	4–2	@ Vancouver Canucks (2000–01)	27–13–4–4	W
49	January 20, 2001	1–2	@ Edmonton Oilers (2000–01)	27–14–4–4	L
50	January 21, 2001	2–4	@ Calgary Flames (2000–01)	27–15–4–4	L
51	January 24, 2001	4–3	Nashville Predators (2000–01)	28–15–4–4	W
52	January 26, 2001	3–2	Mighty Ducks of Anaheim (2000–01)	29–15–4–4	W
53	January 30, 2001	1–3	@ New Jersey Devils (2000–01)	29–16–4–4	L
54	January 31, 2001	3–2 OT	@ Columbus Blue Jackets (2000–01)	30–16–4–4	W

February: 9–0–2–0 (home: 6–0–0–0; road: 3–0–2–0)

Game	Date	Score	Opponent	Record	Recap
55	February 6, 2001	4–2	Ottawa Senators (2000–01)	31–16–4–4	W
56	February 8, 2001	2–1	Toronto Maple Leafs (2000–01)	32–16–4–4	W
57	February 10, 2001	3–3 OT	@ Toronto Maple Leafs (2000–01)	32–16–5–4	T
58	February 14, 2001	4–3 OT	Carolina Hurricanes (2000–01)	33–16–5–4	W
59	February 16, 2001	4–2	Columbus Blue Jackets (2000–01)	34–16–5–4	W
60	February 18, 2001	2–1	@ Dallas Stars (2000–01)	35–16–5–4	W
61	February 20, 2001	3–3 OT	@ Nashville Predators (2000–01)	35–16–6–4	T
62	February 21, 2001	7–3	@ Chicago Blackhawks (2000–01)	36–16–6–4	W
63	February 23, 2001	4–2	St. Louis Blues (2000–01)	37–16–6–4	W
64	February 25, 2001	6–3	Phoenix Coyotes (2000–01)	38–16–6–4	W
65	February 28, 2001	3–1	@ Mighty Ducks of Anaheim (2000–01)	39–16–6–4	W

March: 7–3–3–0 (home: 3–0–1–0; road: 4–3–2–0)

Game	Date	Score	Opponent	Record	Recap
66	March 2, 2001	2–2 OT	@ Phoenix Coyotes (2000–01)	39–16–7–4	T
67	March 3, 2001	3–6	@ Los Angeles Kings (2000–01)	39–17–7–4	L
68	March 6, 2001	4–3	@ Vancouver Canucks (2000–01)	40–17–7–4	W
69	March 10, 2001	2–2 OT	@ St. Louis Blues (2000–01)	40–17–8–4	T
70	March 11, 2001	3–2 OT	@ Minnesota Wild (2000–01)	41–17–8–4	W
71	March 13, 2001	2–2 OT	Vancouver Canucks (2000–01)	41–17–9–4	T
72	March 15, 2001	5–2	Calgary Flames (2000–01)	42–17–9–4	W
73	March 17, 2001	3–5	@ Colorado Avalanche (2000–01)	42–18–9–4	L
74	March 18, 2001	6–4	@ San Jose Sharks (2000–01)	43–18–9–4	W
75	March 22, 2001	4–2	Minnesota Wild (2000–01)	44–18–9–4	W
76	March 24, 2001	6–0	@ New York Rangers (2000–01)	45–18–9–4	W
77	March 28, 2001	5–2	St. Louis Blues (2000–01)	46–18–9–4	W
78	March 31, 2001	0–1	@ Philadelphia Flyers (2000–01)	46–19–9–4	L

April: 3–1–0–0 (home: 3–0–0–0; road: 0–1–0–0)

Game	Date	Score	Opponent	Record	Recap
79	April 1, 2001	2–1 OT	Washington Capitals (2000–01)	47–19–9–4	W
80	April 3, 2001	1–2	@ Columbus Blue Jackets (2000–01)	47–20–9–4	L
81	April 5, 2001	4–0	Atlanta Thrashers (2000–01)	48–20–9–4	W
82	April 7, 2001	4–3	Colorado Avalanche (2000–01)	49–20–9–4	W

Legend: W Win (2 points) L Loss (0 points) T Tie (1 point) OTL Overtime loss (1 point)

=== Playoffs ===
2001 Stanley Cup playoffs
Western Conference Quarterfinals: vs. (7) Los Angeles Kings — Kings win 4–2

Game	Date	Score	Opponent	Series	Recap
1	April 11, 2001	5–3	Los Angeles Kings	Red Wings lead 1–0	W
2	April 14, 2001	4–0	Los Angeles Kings	Red Wings lead 2–0	W
3	April 15, 2001	1–2	@ Los Angeles Kings	Red Wings lead 2–1	L
4	April 18, 2001	3–4 OT	@ Los Angeles Kings	Series tied 2–2	L
5	April 21, 2001	2–3	Los Angeles Kings	Kings lead 3–2	L
6	April 23, 2001	2–3 OT	@ Los Angeles Kings	Kings win 4–2	L

Legend: W Win L Loss

== Player statistics ==
=== Scoring ===
- Position abbreviations: C = Center; D = Defense; G = Goaltender; LW = Left wing; RW = Right wing
- † = Joined team via a transaction (e.g., trade, waivers, signing) during the season. Stats reflect time with the Red Wings only.

No.	Player	Pos	Regular season						Playoffs					
No.	Player	Pos	GP	G	A	Pts	+/-	PIM	GP	G	A	Pts	+/-	PIM
14	Brendan Shanahan	LW	81	31	45	76	9	81	2	2	2	4	3	0
5	Nicklas Lidstrom	D	82	15	56	71	9	18	6	1	7	8	1	0
91	Sergei Fedorov	C	75	32	37	69	12	40	6	2	5	7	0	0
20	Martin Lapointe	RW	82	27	30	57	3	127	6	0	1	1	−4	8
19	Steve Yzerman	C	54	18	34	52	4	18	1	0	0	0	0	0
96	Tomas Holmstrom	LW	73	16	24	40	−12	40	6	1	3	4	−1	8
13	Vyacheslav Kozlov	LW	72	20	18	38	9	30	6	4	1	5	−2	2
15	Pat Verbeek	RW	67	15	15	30	0	73	5	2	0	2	−2	6
8	Igor Larionov†	C	39	4	25	29	6	28	6	1	3	4	−2	2
11	Mathieu Dandenault	D	73	10	15	25	11	38	6	0	1	1	−1	0
33	Kris Draper	C	75	8	17	25	17	38	6	0	1	1	−3	2
28	Steve Duchesne	D	54	6	19	25	9	48	6	2	4	6	0	0
25	Darren McCarty	RW	72	12	10	22	−5	123	6	1	0	1	1	2
17	Doug Brown	C	60	9	13	22	0	14	4	0	0	0	−1	2
55	Larry Murphy	D	57	2	19	21	−6	12	6	0	1	1	2	0
18	Kirk Maltby	RW	79	12	7	19	16	22	6	0	0	0	−3	6
21	Boyd Devereaux	LW	55	5	6	11	1	14	2	0	0	0	−1	0
23	Todd Gill	D	68	3	8	11	17	53	5	0	0	0	−5	8
27	Aaron Ward	D	73	4	5	9	−4	57	—	—	—	—	—	—
2	Jiri Fischer	D	55	1	8	9	3	59	5	0	0	0	−4	9
41	Brent Gilchrist	C	60	1	8	9	−8	41	5	0	1	1	0	0
32	Maxim Kuznetsov	D	25	1	2	3	−1	23	—	—	—	—	—	—
24	Chris Chelios	D	24	0	3	3	4	45	5	1	0	1	−1	2
29	Jason Williams	RW	5	0	3	3	1	2	2	0	0	0	2	0
22	Yuri Butsayev	C	15	1	1	2	−2	4	—	—	—	—	—	—
34	Manny Legace	G	39	0	2	2		4	—	—	—	—	—	—
30	Chris Osgood	G	52	0	0	0		8	6	0	0	0		0
3	Jesse Wallin	D	1	0	0	0	0	2	—	—	—	—	—	—

=== Goaltending ===
No.	Player	Regular season											Playoffs									
No.	Player	GP	GS	W	L	T	SA	GA	GAA	SV%	SO	TOI	GP	GS	W	L	SA	GA	GAA	SV%	SO	TOI
30	Chris Osgood	52	48	25	19	4	1,310	127	2.69	.903	1	2,834:01	6	6	2	4	158	15	2.47	.905	1	365:00
34	Manny Legace	39	34	24	5	5	909	73	2.05	.920	2	2,136:26	—	—	—	—	—	—	—	—	—	—

== Awards and records ==
=== Awards ===
Type	Award/honor	Recipient	Ref
League (annual)	James Norris Memorial Trophy	Nicklas Lidstrom	
League (annual)	Lester Patrick Trophy	Scotty Bowman	
League (annual)	NHL First All-Star Team	Nicklas Lidstrom (Defense)	
League (in-season)	NHL All-Star Game selection	Sergei Fedorov	
League (in-season)	NHL All-Star Game selection	Nicklas Lidstrom (Note: Lidstrom was voted to the starting lineup.)	
League (in-season)	NHL Player of the Week	Sergei Fedorov (November 27)	

=== Milestones ===
Milestone	Player	Date	Ref
1,000th game played	Steve Duchesne	October 15, 2000	
1,000th game played	Brendan Shanahan	February 16, 2001	
First game	Maxim Kuznetsov	October 17, 2000	
First game	Jason Williams	November 20, 2000	

== Transactions ==
The Red Wings were involved in the following transactions from June 11, 2000, the day after the deciding game of the 2000 Stanley Cup Final, through June 9, 2001, the day of the deciding game of the 2001 Stanley Cup Final.

=== Trades ===
Date	Details		Ref
June 24, 2000	To Detroit Red Wings: 2nd-round pick in 2000	To New York Rangers: 2nd-round pick in 2000; 3rd-round pick in 2000	
June 25, 2000	To Detroit Red Wings: 4th-round pick in 2000	To Nashville Predators: 3rd-round pick in 2001	
June 25, 2000	To Detroit Red Wings: 8th-round pick in 2000	To Ottawa Senators: Shane Hnidy	
June 25, 2000	To Detroit Red Wings: 9th-round pick in 2002	To Columbus Blue Jackets: 9th-round pick in 2000	
August 17, 2000	To Detroit Red Wings: 6th-round pick in 2003	To Columbus Blue Jackets: Kent McDonell	
December 28, 2000	To Detroit Red Wings: Igor Larionov	To Florida Panthers: Yan Golubovsky	

=== Players acquired ===
Date	Player	Former team	Term	Via	Ref
July 20, 2000	Steve Brule	New Jersey Devils		Free agency	
August 23, 2000	Boyd Devereaux	Edmonton Oilers	3-year	Free agency	
September 18, 2000	Jason Williams	Peterborough Petes (OHL)		Free agency	
May 24, 2001	Fredrik Olausson	SC Bern (NLA)	1-year	Free agency	

=== Players lost ===
Date	Player	New team	Via (Note: In parentheses is the player's free agency group on July 1 if applicable.)	Ref
June 23, 2000	Darryl Laplante	Minnesota Wild	Expansion draft	
June 23, 2000	Stacy Roest	Minnesota Wild	Expansion draft	
July 1, 2000	Igor Larionov	Florida Panthers	Free agency (III)	
September 27, 2000	David Arsenault	Missouri River Otters (UHL)	Free agency (UFA)	
October 10, 2000	Joe Kocur		Retirement (III)	
N/A	Alexandre Jacques	Toledo Storm (ECHL)	Free agency (UFA)	

=== Signings ===
Date	Player	Term	Contract type	Ref
July 13, 2000	Larry Murphy	1-year	Re-signing	
July 21, 2000	Brent Gilchrist	1-year	Re-signing	
July 28, 2000	Chris Osgood	3-year	Re-signing	
August 3, 2000	Yan Golubovsky	1-year	Re-signing	
August 3, 2000	Maxim Kuznetsov	3-year	Re-signing	
August 3, 2000	Marc Rodgers	1-year	Re-signing	
August 18, 2000	Jason Elliott	2-year	Re-signing	
August 18, 2000	Toivo Suursoo	1-year	Re-signing	
August 18, 2000	B. J. Young	2-year	Re-signing	
September 24, 2000	Vyacheslav Kozlov	2-year	Re-signing	
September 26, 2000	Kris Draper	4-year	Re-signing	
May 25, 2001	Igor Larionov	1-year	Extension	

== Draft picks ==
Detroit's draft picks at the 2000 NHL entry draft held at the Pengrowth Saddledome in Calgary, Alberta.

Round	#	Player	Nationality	College/Junior/Club team (League)
1	29	Niklas Kronwall	Sweden	Djurgardens IF (Sweden)
2	38	Tomas Kopecky	Slovakia	Dukla Trencin Jr. (Slovakia)
4	102	Stefan Liv	Sweden	HV71 (Sweden)
4	127	Dmitri Semyonov	Russia	Dynamo Moscow (Russia)
4	128	Alexander Seluyanov	Russia	Salavat Yulayev Ufa (Russia)
4	130	Aaron Van Leusen	Canada	Brampton Battalion (OHL)
6	187	Par Backer	Sweden	Grums IK (Sweden)
6	196	Paul Ballantyne	Canada	Sault Ste. Marie Greyhounds (OHL)
7	228	Jimmie Svensson	Sweden	VIK Vasteras HK Jr. (Sweden)
8	251	Todd Jackson	United States	US NTDP (NAHL)
8	260	Evgeni Bumagin	Kazakhstan	HK Moscow (Russia)

== Farm teams ==
Cincinnati Mighty Ducks

== See also ==
- 2000–01 NHL season
