= 2000–01 San Jose Sharks season =

National Hockey League team season

2000–01 San Jose Sharks
- Division: 2nd Pacific
- Conference: 5th Western
- 2000–01 record: 40–27–12–3
- Home record: 22–14–4–1
- Road record: 18–13–8–2
- Goals for: 217
- Goals against: 192

Team information
- General manager: Dean Lombardi
- Coach: Darryl Sutter
- Captain: Owen Nolan
- Alternate captains: Vincent Damphousse; Jeff Friesen (Oct.–Mar.); Mike Ricci; Gary Suter
- Arena: San Jose Arena
- Average attendance: 17,468
- Minor league affiliates: Kentucky Thoroughblades; New Orleans Brass

Team leaders
- Goals: Patrick Marleau (25)
- Assists: Niklas Sundstrom (39)
- Points: Patrick Marleau (52)
- Penalty minutes: Bryan Marchment (204)
- Plus/minus: Vincent Damphousse (+17)
- Wins: Evgeni Nabokov (32)
- Goals against average: Evgeni Nabokov (2.19)

The 2000–01 San Jose Sharks season was the team's tenth season of operation in the National Hockey League (NHL). The campaign saw the Sharks win 40 games for the first time in franchise history. In so doing, the team set a new franchise record for points (95) and clinched a playoff berth for the fourth consecutive season.

During the off-season, general manager Dean Lombardi sought to add depth to the Sharks' offense. In addition to retaining nearly all of the prior season's players, Lombardi traded for forward Niklas Sundstrom and signed gritty right winger Scott Thornton. These moves paid dividends immediately, as the Sharks' offense continued to function well despite injuries to key forwards Owen Nolan and Vincent Damphousse. The Sharks also benefited from the strong play of Patrick Marleau, who set career highs in goals (25), assists (27), and points (52) in his fourth season with the team. The Sharks' defense also improved behind the quality play of Gary Suter, Brad Stuart and Scott Hannan.

The 2000–01 regular season is also remembered for the emergence of second-year goaltender Evgeni Nabokov. While Nabokov had been impressive in limited action one season earlier, he remained the backup to starter Steve Shields. However, an early-season ankle injury to Shields forced Nabokov into a starting role. With Nabokov as their starter, the Sharks raced out to a 9–2–2 start. By the time Shields returned from his injury, Nabokov was fully entrenched as starting goaltender. Nabokov was awarded the Calder Memorial Trophy at the end of the season for his play.

Late in the 2000–01 season, the team traded Shields and struggling star Jeff Friesen to Anaheim for superstar forward Teemu Selanne. In making the trade, the Sharks sought to establish themselves as legitimate Stanley Cup contenders for the first time in franchise history. While Selanne played well in limited action, the Sharks' aspirations proved premature. In the first round of the 2001 Stanley Cup playoffs, the team was defeated by the St. Louis Blues in six games.

== Regular season ==
=== Final standings ===
Pacific Division
No.	CR		GP	W	L	T	OTL	GF	GA	Pts
1	3	**Dallas Stars**	82	48	24	8	2	241	187	106
2	5	**San Jose Sharks**	82	40	27	12	3	217	192	95
3	7	**Los Angeles Kings**	82	38	28	13	3	252	228	92
4	9	Phoenix Coyotes	82	35	27	17	3	214	212	90
5	15	Mighty Ducks of Anaheim	82	25	41	11	5	188	245	66

Note: CR = Conference rank; GP = Games played; W = Wins; L = Losses; T = Ties; OTL = Overtime loss; GF = Goals for; GA = Goals against; Pts = Points
Bolded teams qualified for the playoffs.

Western Conference
R		Div	GP	W	L	T	OTL	GF	GA	Pts
**1**	**p – Colorado Avalanche**	**NW**	**82**	**52**	**16**	**10**	**4**	**270**	**192**	**118**
**2**	**y – Detroit Red Wings**	**CEN**	**82**	**49**	**20**	**9**	**4**	**253**	**202**	**111**
**3**	**y – Dallas Stars**	**PAC**	**82**	**48**	**24**	**8**	**2**	**241**	**187**	**106**
**4**	**St. Louis Blues**	**CEN**	**82**	**43**	**22**	**12**	**5**	**249**	**195**	**103**
**5**	**San Jose Sharks**	**PAC**	**82**	**40**	**27**	**12**	**3**	**217**	**192**	**95**
**6**	**Edmonton Oilers**	**NW**	**82**	**39**	**28**	**12**	**3**	**243**	**222**	**93**
**7**	**Los Angeles Kings**	**PAC**	**82**	**38**	**28**	**13**	**3**	**252**	**228**	**92**
**8**	**Vancouver Canucks**	**NW**	**82**	**36**	**28**	**11**	**7**	**239**	**238**	**90**
8.5
9	Phoenix Coyotes	PAC	82	35	27	17	3	214	212	90
10	Nashville Predators	CEN	82	34	36	9	3	186	200	80
11	Calgary Flames	NW	82	27	36	15	4	197	236	73
12	Chicago Blackhawks	CEN	82	29	40	8	5	210	246	71
13	Columbus Blue Jackets	CEN	82	28	39	9	6	190	233	71
14	Minnesota Wild	NW	82	25	39	13	5	168	210	68
15	Mighty Ducks of Anaheim	PAC	82	25	41	11	5	188	245	66

Divisions: CEN – Central, PAC – Pacific, NW – Northwest

bold – Qualified for playoffs; p – Won Presidents' Trophy; y – Won division

== Schedule and results ==
=== Regular season ===
2000–01 regular season
October: 6–2–1–0 (home: 2–1–1–0; road: 4–1–0–0)

Game	Date	Score	Opponent	Decision	Record	Recap
1	October 6, 2000	1–4	St. Louis Blues (2000–01)	Shields	0–1–0–0	L
2	October 12, 2000	2–1	Phoenix Coyotes (2000–01)	Shields	1–1–0–0	W
3	October 14, 2000	5–2	Boston Bruins (2000–01)	Nabokov	2–1–0–0	W
4	October 18, 2000	1–2	@ Dallas Stars (2000–01)	Nabokov	2–2–0–0	L
5	October 20, 2000	3–1	@ Minnesota Wild (2000–01)	Nabokov	3–2–0–0	W
6	October 21, 2000	5–3	@ Nashville Predators (2000–01)	Nabokov	4–2–0–0	W
7	October 24, 2000	3–2	@ Carolina Hurricanes (2000–01)	Nabokov	5–2–0–0	W
8	October 25, 2000	3–1	@ Columbus Blue Jackets (2000–01)	Nabokov	6–2–0–0	W
9	October 28, 2000	2–2 OT	Atlanta Thrashers (2000–01)	Nabokov	6–2–1–0	T

November: 9–3–1–0 (home: 6–1–0–0; road: 3–2–1–0)

Game	Date	Score	Opponent	Decision	Record	Recap
10	November 1, 2000	3–2	Pittsburgh Penguins (2000–01)	Nabokov	7–2–1–0	W
11	November 4, 2000	4–1	Carolina Hurricanes (2000–01)	Nabokov	8–2–1–0	W
12	November 5, 2000	2–2 OT	@ Vancouver Canucks (2000–01)	Nabokov	8–2–2–0	T
13	November 8, 2000	3–2 OT	@ Chicago Blackhawks (2000–01)	Nabokov	9–2–2–0	W
14	November 9, 2000	2–5	@ Columbus Blue Jackets (2000–01)	Shields	9–3–2–0	L
15	November 11, 2000	4–0	@ New York Islanders (2000–01)	Nabokov	10–3–2–0	W
16	November 14, 2000	3–2	@ New Jersey Devils (2000–01)	Nabokov	11–3–2–0	W
17	November 15, 2000	1–4	@ Detroit Red Wings (2000–01)	Nabokov	11–4–2–0	L
18	November 18, 2000	5–3	New York Islanders (2000–01)	Nabokov	12–4–2–0	W
19	November 22, 2000	4–1	Chicago Blackhawks (2000–01)	Nabokov	13–4–2–0	W
20	November 25, 2000	2–3	New Jersey Devils (2000–01)	Nabokov	13–5–2–0	L
21	November 28, 2000	4–1	Minnesota Wild (2000–01)	Shields	14–5–2–0	W
22	November 30, 2000	3–2 OT	Mighty Ducks of Anaheim (2000–01)	Nabokov	15–5–2–0	W

December: 7–4–3–0 (home: 2–2–2–0; road: 5–2–1–0)

Game	Date	Score	Opponent	Decision	Record	Recap
23	December 3, 2000	3–3 OT	@ Edmonton Oilers (2000–01)	Shields	15–5–3–0	T
24	December 4, 2000	8–0	@ Calgary Flames (2000–01)	Nabokov	16–5–3–0	W
25	December 6, 2000	2–2 OT	Dallas Stars (2000–01)	Nabokov	16–5–4–0	T
26	December 8, 2000	1–6	Vancouver Canucks (2000–01)	Nabokov	16–6–4–0	L
27	December 12, 2000	3–2	New York Rangers (2000–01)	Nabokov	17–6–4–0	W
28	December 14, 2000	2–1	Columbus Blue Jackets (2000–01)	Nabokov	18–6–4–0	W
29	December 16, 2000	2–1 OT	@ Phoenix Coyotes (2000–01)	Nabokov	19–6–4–0	W
30	December 18, 2000	5–3	@ Washington Capitals (2000–01)	Nabokov	20–6–4–0	W
31	December 20, 2000	2–0	@ Detroit Red Wings (2000–01)	Nabokov	21–6–4–0	W
32	December 21, 2000	3–4	@ Philadelphia Flyers (2000–01)	Shields	21–7–4–0	L
33	December 23, 2000	2–5	@ Buffalo Sabres (2000–01)	Shields	21–8–4–0	L
34	December 26, 2000	2–1	@ Los Angeles Kings (2000–01)	Nabokov	22–8–4–0	W
35	December 28, 2000	2–2 OT	Edmonton Oilers (2000–01)	Nabokov	22–8–5–0	T
36	December 30, 2000	3–6	Vancouver Canucks (2000–01)	Nabokov	22–9–5–0	L

January: 7–5–3–0 (home: 4–5–1–0; road: 3–0–2–0)

Game	Date	Score	Opponent	Decision	Record	Recap
37	January 1, 2001	3–2	@ Phoenix Coyotes (2000–01)	Nabokov	23–9–5–0	W
38	January 3, 2001	0–1	Calgary Flames (2000–01)	Nabokov	23–10–5–0	L
39	January 4, 2001	2–2 OT	@ Colorado Avalanche (2000–01)	Shields	23–10–6–0	T
40	January 6, 2001	3–1	Florida Panthers (2000–01)	Shields	24–10–6–0	W
41	January 9, 2001	2–1	Buffalo Sabres (2000–01)	Nabokov	25–10–6–0	W
42	January 11, 2001	6–3	St. Louis Blues (2000–01)	Nabokov	26–10–6–0	W
43	January 13, 2001	3–5	Nashville Predators (2000–01)	Shields	26–11–6–0	L
44	January 15, 2001	2–3	Detroit Red Wings (2000–01)	Nabokov	26–12–6–0	L
45	January 17, 2001	4–4 OT	Calgary Flames (2000–01)	Shields	26–12–7–0	T
46	January 20, 2001	1–2	Colorado Avalanche (2000–01)	Nabokov	26–13–7–0	L
47	January 22, 2001	2–2 OT	@ Edmonton Oilers (2000–01)	Nabokov	26–13–8–0	T
48	January 24, 2001	6–1	Edmonton Oilers (2000–01)	Nabokov	27–13–8–0	W
49	January 26, 2001	2–1	@ Dallas Stars (2000–01)	Nabokov	28–13–8–0	W
50	January 27, 2001	4–3 OT	@ St. Louis Blues (2000–01)	Shields	29–13–8–0	W
51	January 30, 2001	1–3	Colorado Avalanche (2000–01)	Nabokov	29–14–8–0	L

February: 5–5–2–0 (home: 3–1–0–0; road: 2–4–2–0)

Game	Date	Score	Opponent	Decision	Record	Recap
52	February 1, 2001	2–4	Dallas Stars (2000–01)	Nabokov	29–15–8–0	L
53	February 6, 2001	1–1 OT	@ Calgary Flames (2000–01)	Shields	29–15–9–0	T
54	February 8, 2001	0–0 OT	@ Vancouver Canucks (2000–01)	Shields	29–15–10–0	T
55	February 10, 2001	3–2 OT	Chicago Blackhawks (2000–01)	Shields	30–15–10–0	W
56	February 14, 2001	7–0	@ Chicago Blackhawks (2000–01)	Shields	31–15–10–0	W
57	February 16, 2001	2–0	@ Nashville Predators (2000–01)	Nabokov	32–15–10–0	W
58	February 18, 2001	1–3	@ Minnesota Wild (2000–01)	Shields	32–16–10–0	L
59	February 20, 2001	3–2 OT	Columbus Blue Jackets (2000–01)	Nabokov	33–16–10–0	W
60	February 21, 2001	0–1	@ Mighty Ducks of Anaheim (2000–01)	Nabokov	33–17–10–0	L
61	February 23, 2001	3–1	Mighty Ducks of Anaheim (2000–01)	Nabokov	34–17–10–0	W
62	February 26, 2001	2–7	@ St. Louis Blues (2000–01)	Nabokov	34–18–10–0	L
63	February 28, 2001	1–2	@ Toronto Maple Leafs (2000–01)	Shields	34–19–10–0	L

March: 3–8–2–2 (home: 3–4–0–0; road: 0–4–2–2)

Game	Date	Score	Opponent	Decision	Record	Recap
64	March 1, 2001	4–8	@ Ottawa Senators (2000–01)	Shields	34–20–10–0	L
65	March 3, 2001	2–3	@ Boston Bruins (2000–01)	Nabokov	34–21–10–0	L
66	March 6, 2001	1–2 OT	@ Tampa Bay Lightning (2000–01)	Nabokov	34–21–10–1	OTL
67	March 7, 2001	3–3 OT	@ Florida Panthers (2000–01)	Nabokov	34–21–11–1	T
68	March 10, 2001	0–3	Nashville Predators (2000–01)	Nabokov	34–22–11–1	L
69	March 12, 2001	3–0	Montreal Canadiens (2000–01)	Nabokov	35–22–11–1	W
70	March 14, 2001	1–4	Los Angeles Kings (2000–01)	Nabokov	35–23–11–1	L
71	March 17, 2001	0–1 OT	@ Los Angeles Kings (2000–01)	Nabokov	35–23–11–2	OTL
72	March 18, 2001	4–6	Detroit Red Wings (2000–01)	Kiprusoff	35–24–11–2	L
73	March 20, 2001	1–4	@ Colorado Avalanche (2000–01)	Nabokov	35–25–11–2	L
74	March 22, 2001	1–2	Ottawa Senators (2000–01)	Nabokov	35–26–11–2	L
75	March 26, 2001	0–0 OT	@ Los Angeles Kings (2000–01)	Nabokov	35–26–12–2	T
76	March 27, 2001	3–2 OT	Los Angeles Kings (2000–01)	Nabokov	36–26–12–2	W
77	March 29, 2001	7–4	Mighty Ducks of Anaheim (2000–01)	Kiprusoff	37–26–12–2	W
78	March 31, 2001	1–3	@ Phoenix Coyotes (2000–01)	Nabokov	37–27–12–2	L

April: 3–0–0–1 (home: 2–0–0–1; road: 1–0–0–0)

Game	Date	Score	Opponent	Decision	Record	Recap
79	April 2, 2001	4–2	Minnesota Wild (2000–01)	Nabokov	38–27–12–2	W
80	April 5, 2001	3–0	Phoenix Coyotes (2000–01)	Nabokov	39–27–12–2	W
81	April 7, 2001	4–5 OT	Dallas Stars (2000–01)	Nabokov	39–27–12–3	OTL
82	April 8, 2001	4–1	@ Mighty Ducks of Anaheim (2000–01)	Kiprusoff	40–27–12–3	W

Legend: W Win (2 points) L Loss (0 points) T Tie (1 point) OTL Overtime loss (1 point)

=== Playoffs ===
2001 Stanley Cup playoffs
Western Conference Quarterfinals vs. (4) St. Louis Blues: Blues win 4–2

Game	Date	Score	Opponent	Series	Recap
1	April 12, 2001	1–3	@ St. Louis Blues	Blues lead 1–0	L
2	April 14, 2001	1–0	@ St. Louis Blues	Series tied 1–1	W
3	April 16, 2001	3–6	St. Louis Blues	Blues lead 2–1	L
4	April 17, 2001	3–2	St. Louis Blues	Series tied 2–2	W
5	April 19, 2001	2–3 OT	@ St. Louis Blues	Blues lead 3–2	L
6	April 21, 2001	1–2	St. Louis Blues	Blues win 4–2	L

Legend: W Win L Loss

== Player statistics ==
=== Scoring ===
- Position abbreviations: C = Center; D = Defense; G = Goaltender; LW = Left wing; RW = Right wing
- † = Joined team via a transaction (e.g., trade, waivers, signing) during the season. Stats reflect time with the Sharks only.
- ‡ = Left team via a transaction (e.g., trade, waivers, release) during the season. Stats reflect time with the Sharks only.

No.	Player	Pos	Regular season						Playoffs					
No.	Player	Pos	GP	G	A	Pts	+/-	PIM	GP	G	A	Pts	+/-	PIM
14	Patrick Marleau	C	81	25	27	52	7	22	6	2	0	2	1	4
11	Owen Nolan	RW	57	24	25	49	0	75	6	1	1	2	−5	8
24	Niklas Sundstrom	RW	82	10	39	49	10	28	6	0	3	3	1	2
25	Vincent Damphousse	C	45	9	37	46	17	62	6	2	1	3	−1	14
18	Mike Ricci	C	81	22	22	44	3	60	6	0	3	3	−1	0
17	Scott Thornton	LW	73	19	17	36	4	114	6	3	0	3	1	8
39	Jeff Friesen‡	LW	64	12	24	36	7	56	—	—	—	—	—	—
20	Gary Suter	D	68	10	24	34	8	84	1	0	0	0	0	0
19	Marco Sturm	LW	81	14	18	32	9	28	6	0	2	2	−2	0
32	Stephane Matteau	LW	80	13	19	32	5	32	6	1	3	4	1	0
15	Alexander Korolyuk	LW	70	12	13	25	2	41	2	0	0	0	0	0
7	Brad Stuart	D	77	5	18	23	10	56	5	1	0	1	0	0
9	Todd Harvey	RW	69	10	11	21	6	72	6	0	0	0	0	8
27	Bryan Marchment	D	75	7	11	18	15	204	5	0	1	1	3	2
22	Scott Hannan	D	75	3	14	17	10	51	6	0	1	1	−1	6
10	Marcus Ragnarsson	D	68	3	12	15	2	44	5	0	1	1	0	8
8	Teemu Selanne†	RW	12	7	6	13	1	0	6	0	2	2	2	2
40	Mike Rathje	D	81	0	11	11	7	48	6	0	1	1	2	4
21	Tony Granato	RW	60	4	5	9	−1	65	4	1	0	1	0	4
23	Shawn Heins	D	38	3	4	7	2	57	2	0	0	0	−1	0
26	Jim Montgomery	C	28	1	6	7	−1	19	—	—	—	—	—	—
16	Mark Smith	C	42	2	2	4	2	51	—	—	—	—	—	—
12	Bill Lindsay†	RW	16	0	4	4	2	29	6	0	0	0	0	16
44	Matt Bradley	RW	21	1	1	2	0	19	—	—	—	—	—	—
2	Bobby Dollas†‡	D	16	1	1	2	4	14	—	—	—	—	—	—
35	Evgeni Nabokov	G	66	0	2	2		8	4	0	0	0		0
5	Jeff Norton†	D	10	0	1	1	4	8	6	0	1	1	−2	2
34	Miikka Kiprusoff	G	5	0	0	0		0	3	0	0	0		0
29	Paul Kruse	LW	1	0	0	0	0	5	—	—	—	—	—	—
28	Mikael Samuelsson	RW	4	0	0	0	0	0	—	—	—	—	—	—
31	Steve Shields‡	G	21	0	0	0		2	—	—	—	—	—	—

=== Goaltending ===
- ‡ = Left team via a transaction (e.g., trade, waivers, release) during the season. Stats reflect time with the Sharks only.

No.	Player	Regular season										Playoffs								
No.	Player	GP	W	L	T	SA	GA	GAA	SV%	SO	TOI	GP	W	L	SA	GA	GAA	SV%	SO	TOI
35	Evgeni Nabokov	66	32	21	7	1582	135	2.19	.915	6	3700	4	1	3	103	10	2.75	.903	1	218
31	Steve Shields‡	21	6	8	5	531	47	2.48	.911	2	1135	—	—	—	—	—	—	—	—	—
34	Miikka Kiprusoff	5	2	1	0	51	5	1.95	.902	0	154	3	1	1	79	5	2.01	.937	0	149

== Awards and records ==
=== Awards ===
Type	Award/honor	Recipient	Ref
League (annual)	Calder Memorial Trophy	Evgeni Nabokov	
League (annual)	NHL All-Rookie Team	Evgeni Nabokov (Goaltender)	
League (in-season)	NHL All-Star Game selection	Vincent Damphousse (Note: Damphousse did not play and was replaced by Simon Gagne of the Philadelphia Flyers.)	
League (in-season)	NHL All-Star Game selection	Evgeni Nabokov	
League (in-season)	NHL All-Star Game selection	Marcus Ragnarsson	
League (in-season)	NHL Player of the Week	Evgeni Nabokov (January 29)	
League (in-season)	NHL Rookie of the Month	Evgeni Nabokov (November)	
League (in-season)	NHL Rookie of the Month	Evgeni Nabokov (December)	
Team	Sharks Player of the Year	Evgeni Nabokov	
Team	Sharks Rookie of the Year	Evgeni Nabokov	

=== Milestones ===
Milestone	Player	Date	Ref
First game	Matt Bradley	October 6, 2000	
First game	Mark Smith	October 6, 2000	
First game	Miikka Kiprusoff	October 24, 2000	
First game	Mikael Samuelsson	January 3, 2001	
1,000th point	Vincent Damphousse	October 14, 2000	
1,000th game played	Gary Suter	October 25, 2000	
600th assist	Gary Suter	January 6, 2001	

== Transactions ==
The Sharks were involved in the following transactions from June 11, 2000, the day after the deciding game of the 2000 Stanley Cup Final, through June 9, 2001, the day of the deciding game of the 2001 Stanley Cup Final.

=== Trades ===
Date	Details		Ref
June 12, 2000	To San Jose Sharks: Future considerations (Note: Columbus and Minnesota agreed not to select Evgeni Nabokov in the expansion draft.)	To Columbus Blue Jackets: Rights to Jan Caloun; 9th-round pick in 2000; Future considerations	
June 12, 2000	To San Jose Sharks: 8th-round pick in 2001; Future considerations	To Minnesota Wild: Andy Sutton; 7th-round pick in 2000; 3rd-round pick in 2001	
June 24, 2000	To San Jose Sharks: 2nd-round pick in 2000	To Chicago Blackhawks: 2nd-round pick in 2000; 3rd-round pick in 2000	
June 25, 2000	To San Jose Sharks: 4th-round pick in 2000	To New York Rangers: 4th-round pick in 2000; 5th-round pick in 2000	
June 25, 2000	To San Jose Sharks: 8th-round pick in 2000	To Washington Capitals: 8th-round pick in 2001	
March 5, 2001	To San Jose Sharks: Teemu Selanne (Note: Anaheim agreed to pay a portion of Selanne’s salary on the final year of his contract in 2001–02.)	To Anaheim Mighty Ducks: Jeff Friesen; Steve Shields; Conditional 2nd-round pick in 2003	
March 6, 2001	To San Jose Sharks: Bill Lindsay	To Calgary Flames: 8th-round pick in 2001	
March 12, 2001	To San Jose Sharks: Jeff Norton	To Pittsburgh Penguins: Bobby Dollas; Johan Hedberg	

=== Players acquired ===
Date	Player	Former team	Term	Via	Ref
June 24, 2000	Zoltan Batovsky	Drummondville Voltigeurs (QMJHL)		Free agency	
July 1, 2000	Scott Thornton	Dallas Stars	4-year	Free agency	
August 10, 2000	Steve Bancroft	Carolina Hurricanes		Free agency	
August 11, 2000	Ryan Kraft	Kentucky Thoroughblades (AHL)		Free agency	
August 11, 2000	David MacIsaac	Los Angeles Kings		Free agency	
August 14, 2000	Greg Andrusak	Toronto Maple Leafs		Free agency	
August 15, 2000	Jim Montgomery	Philadelphia Flyers		Free agency	
September 1, 2000	Larry Courville	Kentucky Thoroughblades (AHL)		Free agency	
September 10, 2000	Paul Kruse	Buffalo Sabres	1-year	Free agency	
November 4, 2000	Bobby Dollas	Manitoba Moose (IHL)		Free agency	
June 7, 2001	Matt Carkner	Peterborough Petes (OHL)		Free agency	

=== Players lost ===
Date	Player	New team	Via (Note: In parentheses is the player's free agency group on July 1 if applicable.)	Ref
N/A	Peter Roed	Iserlohn Roosters (DEL)	Free agency (UFA)	
June 23, 2000	Chris Armstrong	Minnesota Wild	Expansion draft	
June 23, 2000	Michal Bros	Minnesota Wild	Expansion draft	
July 7, 2000	Eric Landry	Montreal Canadiens	Free agency (VI)	
July 21, 2000	Jarrod Skalde	Atlanta Thrashers	Free agency (UFA)	
July 26, 2000	Dave Lowry	Calgary Flames	Free agency (III)	
August 2, 2000	Mike Craig	Colorado Avalanche	Free agency (V)	
August 15, 2000	Brantt Myhres	Nashville Predators	Free agency (UFA)	
September 1, 2000	Jon Coleman	Providence Bruins (AHL)	Free agency (VI)	
September 2000	Garrett Burnett	Cleveland Lumberjacks (IHL)	Free agency (UFA)	
September 22, 2000	Ronnie Stern		Retirement	
November 14, 2000	Jeff Norton	Pittsburgh Penguins	Free agency (III)	
February 16, 2001	Ron Sutter	Calgary Flames	Free agency (III)	

=== Signings ===
Date	Player	Term	Contract type	Ref
June 24, 2000	Mikael Samuelsson		Entry-level	
August 10, 2000	Jarrett Deuling		Re-signing	
August 10, 2000	Niklas Sundstrom	2-year	Re-signing	
September 1, 2000	Christian Gosselin		Re-signing	
September 19, 2000	Evgeni Nabokov		Re-signing	
September 21, 2000	Patrick Marleau	1-year	Re-signing	
September 21, 2000	Marco Sturm	2-year (Note: Club option for a third year.)	Re-signing	
September 22, 2000	Steve Shields	1-year (Note: Club option for a second year.)	Re-signing	
September 30, 2000	Alexander Korolyuk	2-year	Re-signing	
September 30, 2000	Marcus Ragnarsson	2-year	Re-signing	
October 2, 2000	Todd Harvey		Re-signing	
October 11, 2000	Owen Nolan	5-year (Note: Club option for a sixth year.)	Re-signing	
May 11, 2001	Jeff Jillson		Entry-level	

== Draft picks ==
San Jose's picks at the 2000 NHL entry draft, which was held at the Canadian Airlines Saddledome in Calgary on June 24–25, 2000.

Round	#	Player	Position	Nationality	College/Junior/Club team
2	41	Tero Maatta	Defense	Finland	Jokerit Jr. (Finland)
4	104	Jon DiSalvatore	Right wing	United States	Providence College (NCAA)
5	142	Michal Pinc	Center	Czech Republic	Rouyn-Noranda Huskies (QMJHL)
5	166	Nolan Schaefer	Goalie	Canada	Providence College (NCAA)
6	183	Michal Macho	Center	Slovakia	HC Martin
8	246	Chad Wiseman	Left wing	Canada	Mississauga IceDogs (OHL)
8	256	Pasi Saarinen	Defense	Finland	Ilves (Finland)

== See also ==
- 2000–01 NHL season
