= 2000–01 Atlanta Thrashers season =

American ice hockey club season

2000–01 Atlanta Thrashers
- Division: 4th Southeast
- Conference: 13th Eastern
- 2000–01 record: 23–45–12–2
- Home record: 10–23–6–2
- Road record: 13–22–6–0
- Goals for: 211
- Goals against: 289

Team information
- General manager: Don Waddell
- Coach: Curt Fraser
- Captain: Steve Staios
- Alternate captains: Ray Ferraro; Gord Murphy; Jeff Odgers
- Arena: Philips Arena
- Average attendance: 15,262
- Minor league affiliate: Orlando Solar Bears

Team leaders
- Goals: Donald Audette (32)
- Assists: Ray Ferraro (47)
- Points: Ray Ferraro (76)
- Penalty minutes: Jeff Odgers (226)
- Plus/minus: Frantisek Kaberle (+11)
- Wins: Milan Hnilicka (12)
- Goals against average: Milan Hnilicka (3.35)

The 2000–01 Atlanta Thrashers season was the 19th season of play for the National Hockey League franchise that was established on June 22, 1979, and 26th season for the organization overall. The Thrashers finished fourth in the Southeast Division and failed to qualify for the playoffs for the second consecutive season.

== Offseason ==
Steve Staios was named team captain on October 6.

== Regular season ==
The Thrashers struggled on the penalty kill during the regular season, allowing a league-high 90 power-play goals, and finishing 30th overall in penalty-kill percentage, at 77.94%.

=== Final standings ===
Southeast Division
No.	CR		GP	W	L	T	OTL	GF	GA	Pts
1	3	**Washington Capitals**	82	41	27	10	4	233	211	96
2	8	**Carolina Hurricanes**	82	38	32	9	3	212	225	88
3	12	Florida Panthers	82	22	38	13	9	200	246	66
4	13	Atlanta Thrashers	82	23	45	12	2	211	289	60
5	14	Tampa Bay Lightning	82	24	47	6	5	201	280	59

Note: CR = Conference rank; GP = Games played; W = Wins; L = Losses; T = Ties; OTL = Overtime loss; GF = Goals for; GA = Goals against; Pts = Points
Bolded teams qualified for the playoffs.

Eastern Conference
R		Div	GP	W	L	T	OTL	GF	GA	Pts
**1**	**Z-** New Jersey Devils	**AT**	**82**	**48**	**19**	**12**	**3**	**295**	**195**	111
**2**	**Y-** Ottawa Senators	**NE**	**82**	**48**	**21**	**9**	**4**	**274**	**205**	109
**3**	**Y-** Washington Capitals	**SE**	**82**	**41**	**27**	**10**	**4**	**233**	**211**	96
**4**	**X-** Philadelphia Flyers	**AT**	**82**	**43**	**25**	**11**	**3**	**240**	**207**	100
**5**	**X-** Buffalo Sabres	**NE**	**82**	**46**	**30**	**5**	**1**	**218**	**184**	98
**6**	**X-** Pittsburgh Penguins	**AT**	**82**	**42**	**28**	**9**	**3**	**281**	**256**	96
**7**	**X-** Toronto Maple Leafs	**NE**	**82**	**37**	**29**	**11**	**5**	**232**	**207**	90
**8**	**X-** Carolina Hurricanes	**SE**	**82**	**38**	**32**	**9**	**3**	**212**	**225**	88
8.5
9	Boston Bruins	NE	82	36	30	8	8	227	249	88
10	New York Rangers	AT	82	33	43	5	1	250	290	72
11	Montreal Canadiens	NE	82	28	40	8	6	206	232	70
12	Florida Panthers	SE	82	22	38	13	9	200	246	66
13	Atlanta Thrashers	SE	82	23	45	12	2	211	289	60
14	Tampa Bay Lightning	SE	82	24	47	6	5	201	280	59
15	New York Islanders	AT	82	21	51	7	3	185	268	52

Divisions: AT – Atlantic, NE – Northeast, SE – Southeast

Z – Clinched conference; Y – Clinched division; X – Clinched playoff spot

== Schedule and results ==
2000–01 regular season
October: 1–3–5–0 (home: 0–2–2–0; road: 1–1–3–0)

Game	Date	Score	Opponent	Record	Recap
1	October 7, 2000	1–2	New York Rangers (2000–01)	0–1–0–0	L
2	October 11, 2000	3–3 OT	Washington Capitals (2000–01)	0–1–1–0	T
3	October 15, 2000	2–5	@ Tampa Bay Lightning (2000–01)	0–2–1–0	L
4	October 17, 2000	3–3 OT	New Jersey Devils (2000–01)	0–2–2–0	T
5	October 20, 2000	3–5	New York Islanders (2000–01)	0–3–2–0	L
6	October 21, 2000	6–6 OT	@ Ottawa Senators (2000–01)	0–3–3–0	T
7	October 25, 2000	3–1	@ Edmonton Oilers (2000–01)	1–3–3–0	W
8	October 27, 2000	1–1 OT	@ Vancouver Canucks (2000–01)	1–3–4–0	T
9	October 28, 2000	2–2 OT	@ San Jose Sharks (2000–01)	1–3–5–0	T

November: 4–7–1–1 (home: 2–4–0–1; road: 2–3–1–0)

Game	Date	Score	Opponent	Record	Recap
10	November 2, 2000	2–5	Los Angeles Kings (2000–01)	1–4–5–0	L
11	November 4, 2000	8–3	@ Boston Bruins (2000–01)	2–4–5–0	W
12	November 6, 2000	2–3	Ottawa Senators (2000–01)	2–5–5–0	L
13	November 12, 2000	2–2 OT	@ Washington Capitals (2000–01)	2–5–6–0	T
14	November 13, 2000	4–1	@ Florida Panthers (2000–01)	3–5–6–0	W
15	November 15, 2000	1–0	Nashville Predators (2000–01)	4–5–6–0	W
16	November 17, 2000	2–3 OT	Philadelphia Flyers (2000–01)	4–5–6–1	OTL
17	November 18, 2000	1–3	@ Pittsburgh Penguins (2000–01)	4–6–6–1	L
18	November 22, 2000	2–8	@ Tampa Bay Lightning (2000–01)	4–7–6–1	L
19	November 23, 2000	0–6	Montreal Canadiens (2000–01)	4–8–6–1	L
20	November 25, 2000	2–1	Washington Capitals (2000–01)	5–8–6–1	W
21	November 27, 2000	2–3	@ Montreal Canadiens (2000–01)	5–9–6–1	L
22	November 29, 2000	4–6	Detroit Red Wings (2000–01)	5–10–6–1	L

December: 10–5–0–0 (home: 5–2–0–0; road: 5–3–0–0)

Game	Date	Score	Opponent	Record	Recap
23	December 1, 2000	5–3	Tampa Bay Lightning (2000–01)	6–10–6–1	W
24	December 2, 2000	2–1	@ Columbus Blue Jackets (2000–01)	7–10–6–1	W
25	December 4, 2000	5–4	Boston Bruins (2000–01)	8–10–6–1	W
26	December 6, 2000	3–5	Carolina Hurricanes (2000–01)	8–11–6–1	L
27	December 8, 2000	4–3 OT	Florida Panthers (2000–01)	9–11–6–1	W
28	December 9, 2000	5–2	@ New York Islanders (2000–01)	10–11–6–1	W
29	December 11, 2000	0–4	@ New Jersey Devils (2000–01)	10–12–6–1	L
30	December 13, 2000	3–1	Chicago Blackhawks (2000–01)	11–12–6–1	W
31	December 15, 2000	3–6	St. Louis Blues (2000–01)	11–13–6–1	L
32	December 19, 2000	7–6 OT	@ Los Angeles Kings (2000–01)	12–13–6–1	W
33	December 20, 2000	4–2	@ Mighty Ducks of Anaheim (2000–01)	13–13–6–1	W
34	December 22, 2000	1–5	@ Phoenix Coyotes (2000–01)	13–14–6–1	L
35	December 26, 2000	5–3	Toronto Maple Leafs (2000–01)	14–14–6–1	W
36	December 28, 2000	4–1	@ New York Rangers (2000–01)	15–14–6–1	W
37	December 29, 2000	2–5	@ New York Islanders (2000–01)	15–15–6–1	L

January: 1–10–3–1 (home: 0–5–1–1; road: 1–5–2–0)

Game	Date	Score	Opponent	Record	Recap
38	January 1, 2001	2–4	@ Washington Capitals (2000–01)	15–16–6–1	L
39	January 3, 2001	1–1 OT	@ Minnesota Wild (2000–01)	15–16–7–1	T
40	January 5, 2001	4–6	Philadelphia Flyers (2000–01)	15–17–7–1	L
41	January 6, 2001	2–2 OT	@ Philadelphia Flyers (2000–01)	15–17–8–1	T
42	January 10, 2001	2–3	Dallas Stars (2000–01)	15–18–8–1	L
43	January 12, 2001	0–3	Montreal Canadiens (2000–01)	15–19–8–1	L
44	January 13, 2001	1–4	@ Washington Capitals (2000–01)	15–20–8–1	L
45	January 17, 2001	2–5	Mighty Ducks of Anaheim (2000–01)	15–21–8–1	L
46	January 20, 2001	2–3	@ New Jersey Devils (2000–01)	15–22–8–1	L
47	January 21, 2001	4–4 OT	New York Islanders (2000–01)	15–22–9–1	T
48	January 23, 2001	3–4	@ Nashville Predators (2000–01)	15–23–9–1	L
49	January 25, 2001	1–2 OT	Toronto Maple Leafs (2000–01)	15–23–9–2	OTL
50	January 27, 2001	1–5	@ Pittsburgh Penguins (2000–01)	15–24–9–2	L
51	January 29, 2001	7–2	@ New York Rangers (2000–01)	16–24–9–2	W
52	January 30, 2001	3–6	Pittsburgh Penguins (2000–01)	16–25–9–2	L

February: 2–8–1–0 (home: 2–2–1–0; road: 0–6–0–0)

Game	Date	Score	Opponent	Record	Recap
53	February 1, 2001	1–3	Carolina Hurricanes (2000–01)	16–26–9–2	L
54	February 7, 2001	1–7	@ Toronto Maple Leafs (2000–01)	16–27–9–2	L
55	February 9, 2001	5–1	Boston Bruins (2000–01)	17–27–9–2	W
56	February 10, 2001	3–7	Florida Panthers (2000–01)	17–28–9–2	L
57	February 13, 2001	5–4	Buffalo Sabres (2000–01)	18–28–9–2	W
58	February 15, 2001	1–3	@ Buffalo Sabres (2000–01)	18–29–9–2	L
59	February 17, 2001	1–5	@ Philadelphia Flyers (2000–01)	18–30–9–2	L
60	February 21, 2001	3–6	@ Carolina Hurricanes (2000–01)	18–31–9–2	L
61	February 23, 2001	0–1	@ Chicago Blackhawks (2000–01)	18–32–9–2	L
62	February 25, 2001	2–5	@ Colorado Avalanche (2000–01)	18–33–9–2	L
63	February 27, 2001	1–1 OT	Carolina Hurricanes (2000–01)	18–33–10–2	T

March: 4–9–2–0 (home: 0–7–2–0; road: 4–2–0–0)

Game	Date	Score	Opponent	Record	Recap
64	March 2, 2001	4–3	@ Florida Panthers (2000–01)	19–33–10–2	W
65	March 3, 2001	2–2 OT	Florida Panthers (2000–01)	19–33–11–2	T
66	March 6, 2001	2–4	Colorado Avalanche (2000–01)	19–34–11–2	L
67	March 8, 2001	3–5	Pittsburgh Penguins (2000–01)	19–35–11–2	L
68	March 10, 2001	7–5	@ Boston Bruins (2000–01)	20–35–11–2	W
69	March 11, 2001	3–3 OT	Calgary Flames (2000–01)	20–35–12–2	T
70	March 14, 2001	1–8	@ Ottawa Senators (2000–01)	20–36–12–2	L
71	March 16, 2001	0–3	Columbus Blue Jackets (2000–01)	20–37–12–2	L
72	March 18, 2001	3–5	Vancouver Canucks (2000–01)	20–38–12–2	L
73	March 21, 2001	3–4	Tampa Bay Lightning (2000–01)	20–39–12–2	L
74	March 22, 2001	2–0	@ Tampa Bay Lightning (2000–01)	21–39–12–2	W
75	March 24, 2001	3–2	@ Montreal Canadiens (2000–01)	22–39–12–2	W
76	March 26, 2001	0–4	Buffalo Sabres (2000–01)	22–40–12–2	L
77	March 28, 2001	2–4	New Jersey Devils (2000–01)	22–41–12–2	L
78	March 30, 2001	0–4	@ Buffalo Sabres (2000–01)	22–42–12–2	L

April: 1–3–0–0 (home: 1–1–0–0; road: 0–2–0–0)

Game	Date	Score	Opponent	Record	Recap
79	April 1, 2001	2–4	New York Rangers (2000–01)	22–43–12–2	L
80	April 3, 2001	5–2	Ottawa Senators (2000–01)	23–43–12–2	W
81	April 5, 2001	0–4	@ Detroit Red Wings (2000–01)	23–44–12–2	L
82	April 6, 2001	2–3	@ Carolina Hurricanes (2000–01)	23–45–12–2	L

Legend: W Win (2 points) L Loss (0 points) T Tie (1 point) OTL Overtime loss (1 point)

== Player statistics ==
=== Scoring ===
- Position abbreviations: C = Center; D = Defense; G = Goaltender; LW = Left Wing; RW = Right Wing
- † = Joined team via a transaction (e.g., trade, waivers, signing) during the season. Stats reflect time with the Thrashers only.
- ‡ = Left team via a transaction (e.g., trade, waivers, release) during the season. Stats reflect time with the Thrashers only.

No.	Player	Pos	Regular season					
No.	Player	Pos	GP	G	A	Pts	+/-	PIM
21	Ray Ferraro	C	81	29	47	76	−11	91
28	Donald Audette‡	RW	64	32	39	71	−3	64
15	Andrew Brunette	LW	77	15	44	59	−5	26
13	Patrik Stefan	C	66	10	21	31	−3	22
12	Steve Guolla	C	63	12	16	28	−6	23
9	Hnat Domenichelli	LW	63	15	12	27	−9	18
14	Tomi Kallio	LW	56	14	13	27	−3	22
22	Shean Donovan	RW	63	12	11	23	−14	47
25	Steve Staios	D	70	9	13	22	−23	137
39	Per Svartvadet	C	69	10	11	21	−6	20
71	Jiri Slegr†	D	33	3	16	19	−1	36
4	Chris Tamer	D	82	4	13	17	−1	128
24	Andreas Karlsson	C	60	5	11	16	−2	16
8	Frantisek Kaberle	D	51	4	11	15	11	18
5	Gord Murphy	D	27	3	11	14	−11	12
20	Jeff Odgers	RW	82	6	7	13	−8	226
38	Yannick Tremblay	D	46	4	8	12	−6	30
11	Dean Sylvester	RW	43	5	6	11	−16	8
32	Yves Sarault	LW	20	5	4	9	−9	26
37	Herbert Vasiljevs	RW	21	4	5	9	−11	14
27	Denny Lambert	LW	67	1	7	8	−5	215
17	Ladislav Kohn†	RW	26	3	4	7	−12	44
19	Brad Tapper	RW	16	2	3	5	1	6
41	Andrei Skopintsev	D	17	1	3	4	−7	16
23	Brett Clark	D	28	1	2	3	−12	14
18	Jarrod Skalde	C	19	1	2	3	−8	20
3	Sergei Vyshedkevich‡	D	23	1	2	3	−7	14
3	Chris Joseph†	D	19	0	3	3	−7	20
7	Adam Burt	D	27	0	2	2	2	27
26	Bryan Adams	C	9	0	1	1	−4	2
6	David Harlock	D	65	0	1	1	−28	62
2	Petr Buzek	D	5	0	0	0	2	8
30	Scott Fankhouser	G	7	0	0	0		2
33	Milan Hnilicka	G	36	0	0	0		4
10	Darcy Hordichuk	LW	11	0	0	0	−3	38
34	Norm Maracle	G	13	0	0	0		0
29	Brian Pothier	D	3	0	0	0	4	2
1	Damian Rhodes	G	38	0	0	0		16
26	Dan Snyder	C	2	0	0	0	0	0
29	J. P. Vigier	RW	2	0	0	0	−2	0

=== Goaltending ===
No.	Player	Regular season									
No.	Player	GP	W	L	T	SA	GA	GAA	SV%	SO	TOI
33	Milan Hnilicka	36	12	19	2	951	105	3.35	.890	2	1879
1	Damian Rhodes	38	7	19	7	1129	116	3.36	.897	0	2072
30	Scott Fankhouser	7	2	1	0	160	16	3.69	.900	0	260
34	Norm Maracle	13	2	8	3	406	43	3.43	.894	0	753

== Awards and records ==
=== Awards ===
Type	Award/honor	Recipient	Ref
League (in-season)	NHL All-Star Game selection	Donald Audette	
League (in-season)	NHL Player of the Month	Donald Audette (December)	
Team	Community Service Award	Damian Rhodes	
Team	Players' Player Award	Jeff Odgers	
Team	Players' Player Award	Chris Tamer	
Team	Team MVP	Ray Ferraro	
Team	Three Stars of the Game Award	Ray Ferraro	

=== Milestones ===
Milestone	Player	Date	Ref
First game	Tomi Kallio	October 7, 2000	
First game	Brad Tapper	October 7, 2000	
First game	Darcy Hordichuk	January 12, 2001	
First game	J. P. Vigier	February 7, 2001	
First game	Brian Pothier	April 3, 2001	
First game	Dan Snyder	April 3, 2001	

== Transactions ==
The Thrashers were involved in the following transactions from June 11, 2000, the day after the deciding game of the 2000 Stanley Cup Final, through June 9, 2001, the day of the deciding game of the 2001 Stanley Cup Final.

=== Trades ===
Date	Details		Ref
June 12, 2000	To Atlanta Thrashers: 9th-round pick in 2000	To New Jersey Devils: Steve Staios	
June 24, 2000	To Atlanta Thrashers: 2nd-round pick in 2000; 3rd-round pick in 2001	To Vancouver Canucks: 2nd-round pick in 2001; 3rd-round pick in 2001	
June 25, 2000	To Atlanta Thrashers: Anaheim's 4th-round pick in 2000; 5th-round pick in 2000; 8th-round pick in 2000	To Carolina Hurricanes: 4th-round pick in 2000	
June 25, 2000	To Atlanta Thrashers: Rights to Ben Simon	To Chicago Blackhawks: 9th-round pick in 2000	
July 10, 2000	To Atlanta Thrashers: Steve Staios	To New Jersey Devils: Future considerations	
September 29, 2000	To Atlanta Thrashers: 3rd-round pick in 2001	To Minnesota Wild: Matt Johnson	
November 6, 2000	To Atlanta Thrashers: Future considerations	To New Jersey Devils: Geordie Kinnear	
January 14, 2001	To Atlanta Thrashers: Jiri Slegr	To Pittsburgh Penguins: 3rd-round pick in 2001	
February 9, 2001	To Atlanta Thrashers: Ladislav Kohn	To Anaheim Mighty Ducks: Scott Langkow; Sergei Vyshedkevich	
March 13, 2001	To Atlanta Thrashers: Rights to Kamil Piros; 4th-round pick in 2001	To Buffalo Sabres: Donald Audette	

=== Players acquired ===
Date	Player	Former team	Term	Via	Ref
June 15, 2000	Mike Weaver	Michigan State University (CCHA)		Free agency	
July 14, 2000	Adam Burt	Philadelphia Flyers		Free agency	
July 19, 2000	Sean McCann	Phoenix Coyotes		Free agency	
July 20, 2000	Yves Sarault	Ottawa Senators		Free agency	
July 21, 2000	Jarrod Skalde	San Jose Sharks		Free agency	
July 28, 2000	Milan Hnilicka	New York Rangers		Free agency	
September 7, 2000	Andrei Skopintsev	Tampa Bay Lightning		Free agency	
September 29, 2000	Jeff Odgers	Minnesota Wild		Waiver draft	
February 14, 2001	Chris Joseph	Phoenix Coyotes		Waivers	

=== Players lost ===
Date	Player	New team	Via (Note: In parentheses is the player's free agency group on July 1 if applicable.)	Ref
N/A	Bob Lachance	Milano Vipers (Serie A)	Free agency (VI)	
July 3, 2000	Mike Stapleton	New York Islanders	Free agency (III)	
July 27, 2000	Chris McAlpine	Chicago Blackhawks	Free agency (UFA)	
August 10, 2000	Johan Garpenlov	Djurgardens IF (SHL)	Free agency (III)	
September 28, 2000	Bill Huard	London Knights (BISL)	Free agency (III)	
October 2000	Joel Irving	Rochester Americans (AHL)	Free agency (UFA)	
October 7, 2000	Maxim Galanov	Florida Panthers	Free agency (UFA)	

=== Signings ===
Date	Player	Term	Contract type	Ref
June 15, 2000	Ray Ferraro	1-year	Option exercised	
July 14, 2000	Denny Lambert		Re-signing	
July 17, 2000	Donald Audette		Re-signing	
July 17, 2000	Andreas Karlsson		Re-signing	
July 18, 2000	David Harlock	2-year	Re-signing	
July 26, 2000	Norm Maracle	1-year	Re-signing	
July 27, 2000	Shean Donovan	1-year	Re-signing	
July 28, 2000	Hnat Domenichelli		Re-signing	
July 31, 2000	Brett Clark		Re-signing	
July 31, 2000	Scott Fankhouser		Re-signing	
July 31, 2000	Brian Wesenberg		Re-signing	
August 11, 2000	Steve Guolla		Re-signing	
August 11, 2000	Yannick Tremblay		Re-signing	
August 15, 2000	Ben Simon		Entry-level	
September 6, 2000	Petr Buzek	3-year	Re-signing	
September 7, 2000	Herbert Vasiljevs		Re-signing	
October 3, 2000	Darcy Hordichuk		Entry-level	
March 6, 2001	Zdenek Blatny		Entry-level	
March 15, 2001	Chris Tamer	3-year	Extension	
April 1, 2001	Ray Ferraro	1-year	Extension	
April 3, 2001	Dany Heatley	3-year	Entry-level	
April 30, 2001	Kamil Piros		Entry-level	
June 1, 2001	Garnet Exelby		Entry-level	
June 1, 2001	David Kaczowka		Entry-level	
June 1, 2001	Derek MacKenzie		Entry-level	
June 1, 2001	Luke Sellars		Entry-level	
June 1, 2001	Rob Zepp		Entry-level	
June 8, 2001	Jeff Odgers	1-year	Extension	

== Draft picks ==
Atlanta's draft picks at the 2000 NHL entry draft held at the Pengrowth Saddledome in Calgary, Alberta.

Round	#	Player	Nationality	College/Junior/Club team (League)
1	2	Dany Heatley	Canada	University of Wisconsin-Madison (WCHA)
2	31	Ilya Nikulin	Russia	HC MVD Tver (Russia)
2	42	Libor Ustrnul	Czech Republic	Plymouth Whalers (OHL)
4	107	Carl Mallette	Canada	Victoriaville Tigres (QMJHL)
4	108	Blake Robson	Canada	Portland Winterhawks (WHL)
5	147	Matt McRae	United States	Cornell University (ECAC)
6	168	Zdenek Smid	Czech Republic	Karlovy Vary (Czech Republic)
6	178	Jeff Dwyer	United States	Choate Rosemary Hall (USHS-CT)
6	180	Darcy Hordichuk	Canada	Saskatoon Blades (WHL)
8	230	Samu Isosalo	Finland	North Bay Centennials (OHL)
8	242	Evan Nielsen	United States	University of Notre Dame (CCHA)
8	244	Eric Bowen	United States	Portland Winterhawks (WHL)
9	288	Mark McRae	Canada	Cornell University (ECAC)
9	290	Simon Gamache	Canada	Val-d'Or Foreurs (QMJHL)
