= 2000–01 Nashville Predators season =

Professional ice hockey team season

2000–01 Nashville Predators
- Division: 3rd Central
- Conference: 10th Western
- 2000–01 record: 34–36–9–3
- Home record: 16–18–7–0
- Road record: 18–18–2–3
- Goals for: 186
- Goals against: 200

Team information
- General manager: David Poile
- Coach: Barry Trotz
- Captain: Tom Fitzgerald
- Arena: Gaylord Entertainment Center
- Average attendance: 15,767
- Minor league affiliates: Milwaukee Admirals; New Orleans Brass

Team leaders
- Goals: Scott Walker (25)
- Assists: Cliff Ronning (43)
- Points: Cliff Ronning (62)
- Penalty minutes: Cale Hulse (128)
- Plus/minus: Mark Eaton (+7)
- Wins: Mike Dunham (21)
- Goals against average: Mike Dunham (2.28)

The 2000–01 Nashville Predators season was the Nashville Predators' third season in the National Hockey League (NHL). For the third straight year, the Predators missed the playoffs.

== Regular season ==
On December 23, David Legwand scored the first penalty shot overtime goal in NHL history to defeat the New York Rangers 3–2.

=== Final standings ===
Central Division
No.	CR		GP	W	L	T	OTL	GF	GA	Pts
1	2	**Detroit Red Wings**	82	49	20	9	4	253	202	111
2	4	**St. Louis Blues**	82	43	22	12	5	249	195	103
3	10	Nashville Predators	82	34	36	9	3	186	200	80
4	12	Chicago Blackhawks	82	29	40	8	5	210	246	71
5	13	Columbus Blue Jackets	82	28	39	9	6	190	233	71

Note: CR = Conference rank; GP = Games played; W = Wins; L = Losses; T = Ties; OTL = Overtime loss; GF = Goals for; GA = Goals against; Pts = Points
Bolded teams qualified for the playoffs.

Western Conference
R		Div	GP	W	L	T	OTL	GF	GA	Pts
**1**	**p – Colorado Avalanche**	**NW**	**82**	**52**	**16**	**10**	**4**	**270**	**192**	**118**
**2**	**y – Detroit Red Wings**	**CEN**	**82**	**49**	**20**	**9**	**4**	**253**	**202**	**111**
**3**	**y – Dallas Stars**	**PAC**	**82**	**48**	**24**	**8**	**2**	**241**	**187**	**106**
**4**	**St. Louis Blues**	**CEN**	**82**	**43**	**22**	**12**	**5**	**249**	**195**	**103**
**5**	**San Jose Sharks**	**PAC**	**82**	**40**	**27**	**12**	**3**	**217**	**192**	**95**
**6**	**Edmonton Oilers**	**NW**	**82**	**39**	**28**	**12**	**3**	**243**	**222**	**93**
**7**	**Los Angeles Kings**	**PAC**	**82**	**38**	**28**	**13**	**3**	**252**	**228**	**92**
**8**	**Vancouver Canucks**	**NW**	**82**	**36**	**28**	**11**	**7**	**239**	**238**	**90**
8.5
9	Phoenix Coyotes	PAC	82	35	27	17	3	214	212	90
10	Nashville Predators	CEN	82	34	36	9	3	186	200	80
11	Calgary Flames	NW	82	27	36	15	4	197	236	73
12	Chicago Blackhawks	CEN	82	29	40	8	5	210	246	71
13	Columbus Blue Jackets	CEN	82	28	39	9	6	190	233	71
14	Minnesota Wild	NW	82	25	39	13	5	168	210	68
15	Mighty Ducks of Anaheim	PAC	82	25	41	11	5	188	245	66

Divisions: CEN – Central, PAC – Pacific, NW – Northwest

bold – Qualified for playoffs; p – Won Presidents' Trophy; y – Won division

== Schedule and results ==
2000–01 regular season
October: 4–3–3–1 (home: 2–3–3–0; road: 2–0–0–1)

Game	Date	Score	Opponent	Record	Recap
1	October 7, 2000	3–1	@ Pittsburgh Penguins (2000–01)	1–0–0–0	W
2	October 8, 2000	1–3	Pittsburgh Penguins (2000–01)	1–1–0–0	L
3	October 13, 2000	3–1	Washington Capitals (2000–01)	2–1–0–0	W
4	October 14, 2000	2–1	Carolina Hurricanes (2000–01)	3–1–0–0	W
5	October 17, 2000	1–1 OT	Los Angeles Kings (2000–01)	3–1–1–0	T
6	October 19, 2000	2–1 OT	@ Detroit Red Wings (2000–01)	4–1–1–0	W
7	October 21, 2000	3–5	San Jose Sharks (2000–01)	4–2–1–0	L
8	October 24, 2000	4–4 OT	Vancouver Canucks (2000–01)	4–2–2–0	T
9	October 25, 2000	1–2 OT	@ Colorado Avalanche (2000–01)	4–2–2–1	OTL
10	October 27, 2000	3–3 OT	Florida Panthers (2000–01)	4–2–3–1	T
11	October 31, 2000	2–4	St. Louis Blues (2000–01)	4–3–3–1	L

November: 6–6–2–0 (home: 2–3–1–0; road: 4–3–1–0)

Game	Date	Score	Opponent	Record	Recap
12	November 2, 2000	3–1	@ Philadelphia Flyers (2000–01)	5–3–3–1	W
13	November 4, 2000	3–3 OT	Mighty Ducks of Anaheim (2000–01)	5–3–4–1	T
14	November 7, 2000	1–2	@ New York Islanders (2000–01)	5–4–4–1	L
15	November 8, 2000	4–3	@ New Jersey Devils (2000–01)	6–4–4–1	W
16	November 11, 2000	2–2 OT	@ Boston Bruins (2000–01)	6–4–5–1	T
17	November 15, 2000	0–1	@ Atlanta Thrashers (2000–01)	6–5–5–1	L
18	November 16, 2000	1–5	Columbus Blue Jackets (2000–01)	6–6–5–1	L
19	November 18, 2000	3–2	Detroit Red Wings (2000–01)	7–6–5–1	W
20	November 20, 2000	3–6	@ Detroit Red Wings (2000–01)	7–7–5–1	L
21	November 22, 2000	0–1	Dallas Stars (2000–01)	7–8–5–1	L
22	November 24, 2000	0–4	St. Louis Blues (2000–01)	7–9–5–1	L
23	November 26, 2000	7–4	@ Carolina Hurricanes (2000–01)	8–9–5–1	W
24	November 28, 2000	6–1	Calgary Flames (2000–01)	9–9–5–1	W
25	November 30, 2000	3–0	@ Chicago Blackhawks (2000–01)	10–9–5–1	W

December: 4–8–2–0 (home: 1–3–2–0; road: 3–5–0–0)

Game	Date	Score	Opponent	Record	Recap
26	December 1, 2000	1–2	Chicago Blackhawks (2000–01)	10–10–5–1	L
27	December 4, 2000	3–6	@ Vancouver Canucks (2000–01)	10–11–5–1	L
28	December 6, 2000	0–4	@ Edmonton Oilers (2000–01)	10–12–5–1	L
29	December 7, 2000	0–3	@ Calgary Flames (2000–01)	10–13–5–1	L
30	December 10, 2000	2–1	@ Minnesota Wild (2000–01)	11–13–5–1	W
31	December 12, 2000	2–2 OT	Philadelphia Flyers (2000–01)	11–13–6–1	T
32	December 14, 2000	2–6	Edmonton Oilers (2000–01)	11–14–6–1	L
33	December 16, 2000	0–3	Chicago Blackhawks (2000–01)	11–15–6–1	L
34	December 20, 2000	3–1	@ Toronto Maple Leafs (2000–01)	12–15–6–1	W
35	December 21, 2000	2–4	@ Montreal Canadiens (2000–01)	12–16–6–1	L
36	December 23, 2000	3–2 OT	@ New York Rangers (2000–01)	13–16–6–1	W
37	December 26, 2000	5–2	Colorado Avalanche (2000–01)	14–16–6–1	W
38	December 28, 2000	2–2 OT	Mighty Ducks of Anaheim (2000–01)	14–16–7–1	T
39	December 29, 2000	1–3	@ Colorado Avalanche (2000–01)	14–17–7–1	L

January: 8–7–0–1 (home: 3–4–0–0; road: 5–3–0–1)

Game	Date	Score	Opponent	Record	Recap
40	January 1, 2001	2–5	Vancouver Canucks (2000–01)	14–18–7–1	L
41	January 4, 2001	4–2	@ St. Louis Blues (2000–01)	15–18–7–1	W
42	January 6, 2001	0–2	Buffalo Sabres (2000–01)	15–19–7–1	L
43	January 8, 2001	1–2	@ Vancouver Canucks (2000–01)	15–20–7–1	L
44	January 10, 2001	5–2	@ Edmonton Oilers (2000–01)	16–20–7–1	W
45	January 11, 2001	1–2	@ Calgary Flames (2000–01)	16–21–7–1	L
46	January 13, 2001	5–3	@ San Jose Sharks (2000–01)	17–21–7–1	W
47	January 16, 2001	1–2	Edmonton Oilers (2000–01)	17–22–7–1	L
48	January 17, 2001	3–4 OT	@ Dallas Stars (2000–01)	17–22–7–2	OTL
49	January 19, 2001	1–0 OT	Boston Bruins (2000–01)	18–22–7–2	W
50	January 21, 2001	3–1	St. Louis Blues (2000–01)	19–22–7–2	W
51	January 23, 2001	4–3	Atlanta Thrashers (2000–01)	20–22–7–2	W
52	January 24, 2001	3–4	@ Detroit Red Wings (2000–01)	20–23–7–2	L
53	January 27, 2001	1–5	Colorado Avalanche (2000–01)	20–24–7–2	L
54	January 29, 2001	5–2	@ Phoenix Coyotes (2000–01)	21–24–7–2	W
55	January 31, 2001	3–0	@ Mighty Ducks of Anaheim (2000–01)	22–24–7–2	W

February: 4–5–1–0 (home: 3–3–1–0; road: 1–2–0–0)

Game	Date	Score	Opponent	Record	Recap
56	February 1, 2001	6–4	@ Los Angeles Kings (2000–01)	23–24–7–2	W
57	February 8, 2001	3–1	Columbus Blue Jackets (2000–01)	24–24–7–2	W
58	February 10, 2001	2–3	@ Columbus Blue Jackets (2000–01)	24–25–7–2	L
59	February 13, 2001	1–2	Dallas Stars (2000–01)	24–26–7–2	L
60	February 16, 2001	0–2	San Jose Sharks (2000–01)	24–27–7–2	L
61	February 18, 2001	3–2	Tampa Bay Lightning (2000–01)	25–27–7–2	W
62	February 20, 2001	3–3 OT	Detroit Red Wings (2000–01)	25–27–8–2	T
63	February 21, 2001	1–2	@ Washington Capitals (2000–01)	25–28–8–2	L
64	February 24, 2001	2–1	Minnesota Wild (2000–01)	26–28–8–2	W
65	February 27, 2001	1–2	Los Angeles Kings (2000–01)	26–29–8–2	L

March: 7–5–1–1 (home: 4–2–0–0; road: 3–3–1–1)

Game	Date	Score	Opponent	Record	Recap
66	March 1, 2001	2–5	Columbus Blue Jackets (2000–01)	26–30–8–2	L
67	March 4, 2001	5–2	New York Rangers (2000–01)	27–30–8–2	W
68	March 6, 2001	1–5	@ Phoenix Coyotes (2000–01)	27–31–8–2	L
69	March 8, 2001	1–4	@ Los Angeles Kings (2000–01)	27–32–8–2	L
70	March 10, 2001	3–0	@ San Jose Sharks (2000–01)	28–32–8–2	W
71	March 11, 2001	0–1 OT	@ Mighty Ducks of Anaheim (2000–01)	28–32–8–3	OTL
72	March 15, 2001	2–3	@ Chicago Blackhawks (2000–01)	28–33–8–3	L
73	March 17, 2001	4–1	Phoenix Coyotes (2000–01)	29–33–8–3	W
74	March 19, 2001	2–1	@ Columbus Blue Jackets (2000–01)	30–33–8–3	W
75	March 21, 2001	0–0 OT	@ Minnesota Wild (2000–01)	30–33–9–3	T
76	March 22, 2001	2–1 OT	@ Chicago Blackhawks (2000–01)	31–33–9–3	W
77	March 24, 2001	0–4	Ottawa Senators (2000–01)	31–34–9–3	L
78	March 29, 2001	4–3 OT	Phoenix Coyotes (2000–01)	32–34–9–3	W
79	March 31, 2001	4–1	Minnesota Wild (2000–01)	33–34–9–3	W

April: 1–2–0–0 (home: 1–0–0–0; road: 0–2–0–0)

Game	Date	Score	Opponent	Record	Recap
80	April 4, 2001	1–5	@ Dallas Stars (2000–01)	33–35–9–3	L
81	April 5, 2001	4–0	Calgary Flames (2000–01)	34–35–9–3	W
82	April 7, 2001	0–1	@ St. Louis Blues (2000–01)	34–36–9–3	L

Legend: W Win (2 points) L Loss (0 points) T Tie (1 point) OTL Overtime loss (1 point)

== Player statistics ==
=== Scoring ===
- Position abbreviations: C = Center; D = Defense; G = Goaltender; LW = Left wing; RW = Right wing
- ‡ = Left team via a transaction (e.g., trade, waivers, release) during the season. Stats reflect time with the Predators only.

No.	Player	Pos	Regular season					
No.	Player	Pos	GP	G	A	Pts	+/-	PIM
7	Cliff Ronning	C	80	19	43	62	4	28
24	Scott Walker	RW	74	25	29	54	−2	66
10	Patric Kjellberg	RW	81	14	31	45	−2	12
11	David Legwand	C	81	13	28	41	1	38
43	Vitali Yachmenev	LW	78	15	19	34	−5	10
22	Greg Johnson	C	82	15	17	32	−6	46
39	Marian Cisar	RW	60	12	15	27	−7	45
27	Randy Robitaille	C	62	9	17	26	−11	12
44	Kimmo Timonen	D	82	12	13	25	−6	50
15	Drake Berehowsky‡	D	66	6	18	24	−9	100
21	Tom Fitzgerald	RW	82	9	9	18	−5	71
23	Bill Houlder	D	81	4	12	16	−7	40
17	Scott Hartnell	LW	75	2	14	16	−8	48
12	Rob Valicevic	RW	60	8	6	14	−2	26
25	Denis Arkhipov	C	40	6	7	13	0	4
3	Karlis Skrastins	D	82	1	11	12	−12	30
4	Mark Eaton	D	34	3	8	11	7	14
41	Richard Lintner	D	50	3	5	8	2	22
32	Cale Hulse	D	82	1	7	8	−5	128
9	Greg Classen	C	27	2	4	6	−4	14
71	Sebastien Bordeleau‡	C	14	2	3	5	−4	14
16	Ville Peltonen	LW	23	3	1	4	−7	2
19	Mike Watt	LW	18	1	1	2	−2	8
28 (Note: Stevenson wore number 37 in his first game.)	Jeremy Stevenson	LW	8	1	0	1	−1	39
36	Sean Haggerty	LW	3	0	1	1	1	0
26	Andrew Berenzweig	D	5	0	0	0	0	0
38	Alexandre Boikov	D	8	0	0	0	−1	13
1	Mike Dunham	G	48	0	0	0		2
49	Rory Fitzpatrick‡	D	2	0	0	0	−2	2
30	Chris Mason	G	1	0	0	0		0
8	Craig Millar‡	D	5	0	0	0	1	6
33	Marc Moro	D	6	0	0	0	1	12
74	Brantt Myhres‡	RW	20	0	0	0	−5	28
42	Pavel Skrbek	D	5	0	0	0	1	4
29	Tomas Vokoun	G	37	0	0	0		2

=== Goaltending ===
No.	Player	Regular season									
No.	Player	GP	W	L	T	SA	GA	GAA	SV%	SO	TOI
1	Mike Dunham	48	21	21	4	1381	107	2.28	.923	4	2810
29	Tomas Vokoun	37	13	17	5	940	85	2.44	.910	2	2088
30	Chris Mason	1	0	1	0	20	2	2.03	.900	0	59

== Awards and records ==
=== Awards ===
Type	Award/honor	Recipient	Ref
League (annual)	Lester Patrick Trophy	David Poile	

=== Milestones ===
Milestone	Player	Date	Ref
First game	Greg Classen	October 6, 2000	
First game	Scott Hartnell	October 6, 2000	
First game	Denis Arkhipov	January 8, 2001	

== Transactions ==
The Predators were involved in the following transactions from June 11, 2000, the day after the deciding game of the 2000 Stanley Cup Final, through June 9, 2001, the day of the deciding game of the 2001 Stanley Cup Final.

=== Trades ===
Date	Details		Ref
June 12, 2000	To Nashville Predators: Phoenix’s 5th-round pick in 2000	To Edmonton Oilers: Patrick Cote	
June 25, 2000	To Nashville Predators: 3rd-round pick in 2001	To Detroit Red Wings: 4th-round pick in 2000	
September 25, 2000	To Nashville Predators: Alexei Vasiliev	To New York Rangers: Conditional draft pick	
September 29, 2000	To Nashville Predators: Mark Eaton	To Philadelphia Flyers: Detroit’s 3rd-round pick in 2001	
January 12, 2001	To Nashville Predators: Future considerations	To Edmonton Oilers: Rory Fitzpatrick	
February 1, 2001	To Nashville Predators: Future considerations	To Washington Capitals: Brantt Myhres	
March 7, 2001	To Nashville Predators: Bert Robertsson	To New York Rangers: Ryan Tobler	
March 9, 2001	To Nashville Predators: Atlanta’s 2nd-round pick in 2001	To Vancouver Canucks: Drake Berehowsky	
May 24, 2001	To Nashville Predators: Mikhail Chernov	To Philadelphia Flyers: Mike Watt	

=== Players acquired ===
Date	Player	Former team	Term	Via	Ref
August 15, 2000	Brantt Myhres	San Jose Sharks		Free agency	
September 25, 2000	Jeremy Stevenson	Anaheim Mighty Ducks		Free agency	
January 2, 2001	Robert Schnabel	Phoenix Coyotes		Waivers	
May 2, 2001	Bryan Lundbohm	University of North Dakota (WCHA)		Free agency	
June 1, 2001	Bill Bowler	Columbus Blue Jackets		Waivers	
June 1, 2001	Vladimir Orszagh	Djurgardens IF (SHL)		Free agency	

=== Players lost ===
Date	Player	New team	Via (Note: In parentheses is the player's free agency group on July 1 if applicable.)	Ref
July 7, 2000	Eric Bertrand	Montreal Canadiens	Free agency (VI)	
August 31, 2000	Paul Healey	Edmonton Oilers	Free agency (VI)	
September 29, 2000	Zdeno Ciger	Minnesota Wild	Waiver draft	
September 30, 2000	Jeff Kealty		Retirement (UFA)	
October 25, 2000	Phil Crowe	Detroit Vipers (IHL)	Free agency (UFA)	
October 25, 2000	Craig Millar	Tampa Bay Lightning	Waivers	
November 14, 2000	Brent Peterson	SCL Tigers (NLA)	Free agency (VI)	
March 13, 2001	Sebastien Bordeleau	St. Louis Blues	Waivers	
April 26, 2001	Ville Peltonen	Jokerit (Liiga)	Free agency	

=== Signings ===
Date	Player	Term	Contract type	Ref
June 12, 2000	Patric Kjellberg		Re-signing	
June 14, 2000	Rory Fitzpatrick		Re-signing	
June 14, 2000	Evgeny Namestnikov		Re-signing	
June 27, 2000	Martin Bartek		Entry-level	
June 27, 2000	Drake Berehowsky	1-year	Option exercised	
July 7, 2000	Timo Helbling		Entry-level	
July 7, 2000	Petr Sachl		Entry-level	
July 11, 2000	Sean Haggerty		Re-signing	
July 11, 2000	Chris Mason		Re-signing	
July 13, 2000	Denis Arkhipov		Entry-level	
July 13, 2000	Alexander Krevsun		Entry-level	
July 14, 2000	Greg Johnson		Re-signing	
August 3, 2000	Mike Watt		Re-signing	
August 21, 2000	Marc Moro		Re-signing	
September 1, 2000	Richard Lintner		Re-signing	
September 7, 2000	Scott Hartnell		Entry-level	
September 30, 2000	Kimmo Timonen		Re-signing	
January 3, 2001	Cliff Ronning		Extension	
January 3, 2001	Vitali Yachmenev		Extension	
January 16, 2001	Alexandre Boikov		Extension	
January 19, 2001	Tomas Vokoun		Extension	
February 19, 2001	Tom Fitzgerald	1-year	Extension	
April 9, 2001	Bill Houlder	1-year	Extension	
June 1, 2001	Chris Mason	1-year	Option exercised	
June 1, 2001	Konstantin Panov		Entry-level	
June 5, 2001	Bert Robertsson		Extension	
June 5, 2001	Jeremy Stevenson		Extension	

== Draft picks ==
Nashville's draft picks at the 2000 NHL entry draft held at the Pengrowth Saddledome in Calgary, Alberta.

Round	#	Player	Nationality	College/Junior/Club team (League)
1	6	Scott Hartnell	Canada	Prince Albert Raiders (WHL)
2	36	Daniel Widing	Sweden	Leksands IF Jr. (Sweden)
3	72	Mattias Nilsson	Sweden	MODO (Sweden)
3	89	Libor Pivko	Czech Republic	Havirov Femax HC (Czech Republic)
5	131	Matt Hendricks	United States	Blaine High School (USHS-MN)
5	137	Mike Stuart	United States	Colorado College (WCHA)
5	154	Matt Koalska	United States	St. Paul Vulcans (USHL)
6	173	Tomas Harant	Slovakia	MsHK Zilina (Slovakia)
6	197	Zbynek Irgl	Czech Republic	HC Vitkovice (Czech Republic)
7	203	Jure Penko	Slovenia	Green Bay Gamblers (USHL)
8	236	Mats Christeen	Sweden	Sodertalje SK Jr. (Sweden)
9	284	Martin Hohener	Switzerland	Kloten Flyers (Switzerland)

== See also ==
- 2000–01 NHL season
