= 2000–01 Phoenix Coyotes season =

NHL hockey team season

2000–01 Phoenix Coyotes
- Division: 4th Pacific
- Conference: 9th Western
- 2000–01 record: 35–27–17–3
- Home record: 21–11–7–2
- Road record: 14–16–10–1
- Goals for: 214
- Goals against: 212

Team information
- General manager: Bobby Smith (Oct.–Feb.); Cliff Fletcher (Feb.–Apr.)
- Coach: Bob Francis
- Captain: Keith Tkachuk (Oct.–Mar.); Vacant (Mar.–Apr.)
- Arena: America West Arena
- Average attendance: 14,224
- Minor league affiliates: Springfield Falcons; Mississippi Sea Wolves; B.C. Icemen

Team leaders
- Goals: Jeremy Roenick (30)
- Assists: Jeremy Roenick (46)
- Points: Jeremy Roenick (76)
- Penalty minutes: Jeremy Roenick (114)
- Plus/minus: Keith Carney (+15)
- Wins: Sean Burke (25)
- Goals against average: Sean Burke (2.27)

The 2000–01 Phoenix Coyotes season was their fifth season in the National Hockey League, the franchise's 22nd season in the NHL and 29th overall. Before the season began, Wayne Gretzky became a part owner. The Coyotes failed to qualify for the playoffs for the first time since 1995 when they were known as the Winnipeg Jets.

== Offseason ==
On June 2, 2000, Wayne Gretzky was introduced by Phoenix Coyotes Owner & Chairman Steve Ellman as the managing partner of the Coyotes in charge of all hockey operations. Gretzky did not officially begin his new role until February 15, 2001 — the date Ellman's ownership group completed the purchase of the Coyotes. Among his first moves, Gretzky brought in proven Stanley Cup winners such as Cliff Fletcher (as senior executive vice president) and Dave Draper (as vice president of scouting and player personnel) to direct the Coyotes' hockey operations department. Six months later, Gretzky added Michael Barnett, the former president of IMG Hockey, as the Coyotes' general manager.

== Regular season ==
Captain Keith Tkachuk was traded in March.

=== Final standings ===
Pacific Division
No.	CR		GP	W	L	T	OTL	GF	GA	Pts
1	3	**Dallas Stars**	82	48	24	8	2	241	187	106
2	5	**San Jose Sharks**	82	40	27	12	3	217	192	95
3	7	**Los Angeles Kings**	82	38	28	13	3	252	228	92
4	9	Phoenix Coyotes	82	35	27	17	3	214	212	90
5	15	Mighty Ducks of Anaheim	82	25	41	11	5	188	245	66

Note: CR = Conference rank; GP = Games played; W = Wins; L = Losses; T = Ties; OTL = Overtime loss; GF = Goals for; GA = Goals against; Pts = Points
Bolded teams qualified for the playoffs.

Western Conference
R		Div	GP	W	L	T	OTL	GF	GA	Pts
**1**	**p – Colorado Avalanche**	**NW**	**82**	**52**	**16**	**10**	**4**	**270**	**192**	**118**
**2**	**y – Detroit Red Wings**	**CEN**	**82**	**49**	**20**	**9**	**4**	**253**	**202**	**111**
**3**	**y – Dallas Stars**	**PAC**	**82**	**48**	**24**	**8**	**2**	**241**	**187**	**106**
**4**	**St. Louis Blues**	**CEN**	**82**	**43**	**22**	**12**	**5**	**249**	**195**	**103**
**5**	**San Jose Sharks**	**PAC**	**82**	**40**	**27**	**12**	**3**	**217**	**192**	**95**
**6**	**Edmonton Oilers**	**NW**	**82**	**39**	**28**	**12**	**3**	**243**	**222**	**93**
**7**	**Los Angeles Kings**	**PAC**	**82**	**38**	**28**	**13**	**3**	**252**	**228**	**92**
**8**	**Vancouver Canucks**	**NW**	**82**	**36**	**28**	**11**	**7**	**239**	**238**	**90**
8.5
9	Phoenix Coyotes	PAC	82	35	27	17	3	214	212	90
10	Nashville Predators	CEN	82	34	36	9	3	186	200	80
11	Calgary Flames	NW	82	27	36	15	4	197	236	73
12	Chicago Blackhawks	CEN	82	29	40	8	5	210	246	71
13	Columbus Blue Jackets	CEN	82	28	39	9	6	190	233	71
14	Minnesota Wild	NW	82	25	39	13	5	168	210	68
15	Mighty Ducks of Anaheim	PAC	82	25	41	11	5	188	245	66

Divisions: CEN – Central, PAC – Pacific, NW – Northwest

bold – Qualified for playoffs; p – Won Presidents' Trophy; y – Won division

== Schedule and results ==
2000–01 regular season
October: 9–1–2–0 (home: 5–0–0–0; road: 4–1–2–0)

Game	Date	Score	Opponent	Record	Recap
1	October 5, 2000	4–1	St. Louis Blues (2000–01)	1–0–0–0	W
2	October 7, 2000	4–1	Minnesota Wild (2000–01)	2–0–0–0	W
3	October 12, 2000	1–2	@ San Jose Sharks (2000–01)	2–1–0–0	L
4	October 14, 2000	6–3	Philadelphia Flyers (2000–01)	3–1–0–0	W
5	October 15, 2000	6–5	@ Los Angeles Kings (2000–01)	4–1–0–0	W
6	October 18, 2000	2–1 OT	Florida Panthers (2000–01)	5–1–0–0	W
7	October 21, 2000	3–2 OT	@ Vancouver Canucks (2000–01)	6–1–0–0	W
8	October 22, 2000	3–3 OT	@ Edmonton Oilers (2000–01)	6–1–1–0	T
9	October 24, 2000	2–2 OT	@ Calgary Flames (2000–01)	6–1–2–0	T
10	October 27, 2000	4–2	@ Dallas Stars (2000–01)	7–1–2–0	W
11	October 28, 2000	3–1	Los Angeles Kings (2000–01)	8–1–2–0	W
12	October 30, 2000	4–0	@ Colorado Avalanche (2000–01)	9–1–2–0	W

November: 4–6–4–0 (home: 2–3–1–0; road: 2–3–3–0)

Game	Date	Score	Opponent	Record	Recap
13	November 1, 2000	1–1 OT	@ Mighty Ducks of Anaheim (2000–01)	9–1–3–0	T
14	November 3, 2000	2–2 OT	Dallas Stars (2000–01)	9–1–4–0	T
15	November 7, 2000	3–3 OT	@ Los Angeles Kings (2000–01)	9–1–5–0	T
16	November 8, 2000	2–4	Detroit Red Wings (2000–01)	9–2–5–0	L
17	November 11, 2000	1–2	@ Columbus Blue Jackets (2000–01)	9–3–5–0	L
18	November 12, 2000	2–0	@ New York Rangers (2000–01)	10–3–5–0	W
19	November 14, 2000	2–2 OT	@ Washington Capitals (2000–01)	10–3–6–0	T
20	November 16, 2000	6–3	Colorado Avalanche (2000–01)	11–3–6–0	W
21	November 18, 2000	2–6	Mighty Ducks of Anaheim (2000–01)	11–4–6–0	L
22	November 21, 2000	1–4	Chicago Blackhawks (2000–01)	11–5–6–0	L
23	November 25, 2000	1–5	@ St. Louis Blues (2000–01)	11–6–6–0	L
24	November 26, 2000	2–1	@ Philadelphia Flyers (2000–01)	12–6–6–0	W
25	November 29, 2000	1–2	@ Colorado Avalanche (2000–01)	12–7–6–0	L
26	November 30, 2000	2–0	Minnesota Wild (2000–01)	13–7–6–0	W

December: 3–2–4–1 (home: 3–1–2–1; road: 0–1–2–0)

Game	Date	Score	Opponent	Record	Recap
27	December 2, 2000	2–5	Dallas Stars (2000–01)	13–8–6–0	L
28	December 6, 2000	1–1 OT	Vancouver Canucks (2000–01)	13–8–7–0	T
29	December 10, 2000	1–1 OT	Columbus Blue Jackets (2000–01)	13–8–8–0	T
30	December 14, 2000	3–2	Tampa Bay Lightning (2000–01)	14–8–8–0	W
31	December 16, 2000	1–2 OT	San Jose Sharks (2000–01)	14–8–8–1	OTL
32	December 20, 2000	4–2	Calgary Flames (2000–01)	15–8–8–1	W
33	December 22, 2000	5–1	Atlanta Thrashers (2000–01)	16–8–8–1	W
34	December 27, 2000	1–1 OT	@ Chicago Blackhawks (2000–01)	16–8–9–1	T
35	December 29, 2000	2–2 OT	@ Minnesota Wild (2000–01)	16–8–10–1	T
36	December 30, 2000	1–2	@ St. Louis Blues (2000–01)	16–9–10–1	L

January: 7–6–2–0 (home: 4–2–0–0; road: 3–4–2–0)

Game	Date	Score	Opponent	Record	Recap
37	January 1, 2001	2–3	San Jose Sharks (2000–01)	16–10–10–1	L
38	January 4, 2001	3–1	New York Rangers (2000–01)	17–10–10–1	W
39	January 6, 2001	2–1	@ New York Islanders (2000–01)	18–10–10–1	W
40	January 9, 2001	2–2 OT	@ Detroit Red Wings (2000–01)	18–10–11–1	T
41	January 10, 2001	1–5	@ New Jersey Devils (2000–01)	18–11–11–1	L
42	January 12, 2001	2–3	@ Toronto Maple Leafs (2000–01)	18–12–11–1	L
43	January 13, 2001	2–5	@ Montreal Canadiens (2000–01)	18–13–11–1	L
44	January 15, 2001	3–1	St. Louis Blues (2000–01)	19–13–11–1	W
45	January 17, 2001	5–4	Pittsburgh Penguins (2000–01)	20–13–11–1	W
46	January 19, 2001	4–3	@ Mighty Ducks of Anaheim (2000–01)	21–13–11–1	W
47	January 21, 2001	5–2	Dallas Stars (2000–01)	22–13–11–1	W
48	January 23, 2001	4–2	@ Calgary Flames (2000–01)	23–13–11–1	W
49	January 24, 2001	2–6	@ Vancouver Canucks (2000–01)	23–14–11–1	L
50	January 26, 2001	1–1 OT	@ Edmonton Oilers (2000–01)	23–14–12–1	T
51	January 29, 2001	2–5	Nashville Predators (2000–01)	23–15–12–1	L

February: 6–6–0–1 (home: 3–2–0–1; road: 3–4–0–0)

Game	Date	Score	Opponent	Record	Recap
52	February 1, 2001	2–4	Mighty Ducks of Anaheim (2000–01)	23–16–12–1	L
53	February 7, 2001	1–2 OT	Carolina Hurricanes (2000–01)	23–16–12–2	OTL
54	February 9, 2001	2–0	Edmonton Oilers (2000–01)	24–16–12–2	W
55	February 11, 2001	3–2	Chicago Blackhawks (2000–01)	25–16–12–2	W
56	February 13, 2001	5–2	@ Tampa Bay Lightning (2000–01)	26–16–12–2	W
57	February 14, 2001	3–4	@ Florida Panthers (2000–01)	26–17–12–2	L
58	February 16, 2001	2–0	@ Carolina Hurricanes (2000–01)	27–17–12–2	W
59	February 18, 2001	1–4	Calgary Flames (2000–01)	27–18–12–2	L
60	February 21, 2001	3–2	Columbus Blue Jackets (2000–01)	28–18–12–2	W
61	February 23, 2001	7–3	@ Buffalo Sabres (2000–01)	29–18–12–2	W
62	February 25, 2001	3–6	@ Detroit Red Wings (2000–01)	29–19–12–2	L
63	February 27, 2001	4–7	@ Boston Bruins (2000–01)	29–20–12–2	L
64	February 28, 2001	2–5	@ Columbus Blue Jackets (2000–01)	29–21–12–2	L

March: 5–5–4–1 (home: 4–3–3–0; road: 1–2–1–1)

Game	Date	Score	Opponent	Record	Recap
65	March 2, 2001	2–2 OT	Detroit Red Wings (2000–01)	29–21–13–2	T
66	March 4, 2001	0–5	Colorado Avalanche (2000–01)	29–22–13–2	L
67	March 6, 2001	5–1	Nashville Predators (2000–01)	30–22–13–2	W
68	March 8, 2001	3–2 OT	Vancouver Canucks (2000–01)	31–22–13–2	W
69	March 10, 2001	3–3 OT	Montreal Canadiens (2000–01)	31–22–14–2	T
70	March 14, 2001	2–3	New Jersey Devils (2000–01)	31–23–14–2	L
71	March 16, 2001	1–1 OT	@ Dallas Stars (2000–01)	31–23–15–2	T
72	March 17, 2001	1–4	@ Nashville Predators (2000–01)	31–24–15–2	L
73	March 19, 2001	2–6	@ Los Angeles Kings (2000–01)	31–25–15–2	L
74	March 21, 2001	2–5	Ottawa Senators (2000–01)	31–26–15–2	L
75	March 24, 2001	7–4	Edmonton Oilers (2000–01)	32–26–15–2	W
76	March 25, 2001	2–2 OT	New York Islanders (2000–01)	32–26–16–2	T
77	March 28, 2001	2–0	@ Minnesota Wild (2000–01)	33–26–16–2	W
78	March 29, 2001	3–4 OT	@ Nashville Predators (2000–01)	33–26–16–3	OTL
79	March 31, 2001	3–1	San Jose Sharks (2000–01)	34–26–16–3	W

April: 1–1–1–0 (home: 0–0–1–0; road: 1–1–0–0)

Game	Date	Score	Opponent	Record	Recap
80	April 3, 2001	2–2 OT	Los Angeles Kings (2000–01)	34–26–17–3	T
81	April 5, 2001	0–3	@ San Jose Sharks (2000–01)	34–27–17–3	L
82	April 6, 2001	5–2	@ Mighty Ducks of Anaheim (2000–01)	35–27–17–3	W

Legend: W Win (2 points) L Loss (0 points) T Tie (1 point) OTL Overtime loss (1 point)

== Player statistics ==
=== Scoring ===
- Position abbreviations: C = Center; D = Defense; G = Goaltender; LW = Left wing; RW = Right wing
- † = Joined team via a transaction (e.g., trade, waivers, signing) during the season. Stats reflect time with the Coyotes only.
- ‡ = Left team via a transaction (e.g., trade, waivers, release) during the season. Stats reflect time with the Coyotes only.

No.	Player	Pos	Regular season					
No.	Player	Pos	GP	G	A	Pts	+/-	PIM
97	Jeremy Roenick	C	80	30	46	76	−1	114
7	Keith Tkachuk‡	LW	64	29	42	71	6	108
19	Shane Doan	RW	76	26	37	63	0	89
90	Joe Juneau	C	69	10	23	33	−2	28
28	Landon Wilson	RW	70	18	13	31	3	92
27	Teppo Numminen	D	72	5	26	31	9	36
39	Travis Green	C	69	13	15	28	−11	63
22	Claude Lemieux†	RW	46	10	16	26	1	58
32	Brad May	LW	62	11	14	25	10	107
21	Jyrki Lumme	D	58	4	21	25	3	44
36	Juha Ylonen	C	69	9	14	23	10	38
10	Trevor Letowski	RW	77	7	15	22	−2	32
18	Mika Alatalo	LW	70	7	12	19	1	22
4	Ossi Vaananen	D	81	4	12	16	9	90
3	Keith Carney	D	82	2	14	16	15	86
8	Daniel Briere	C	30	11	4	15	−2	12
20	Wyatt Smith	C	42	3	7	10	7	13
15	Radoslav Suchy	D	72	0	10	10	1	22
26	Mike Sullivan	C	72	5	4	9	−6	16
16	Michal Handzus†	C	10	4	4	8	5	21
12	Mike Johnson†	RW	12	2	3	5	0	4
24	Stan Neckar‡	D	53	2	2	4	−2	63
23	Paul Mara†	D	16	0	4	4	1	14
6	Joel Bouchard	D	32	1	2	3	−8	22
42	Robert Esche	G	25	0	3	3		2
23	Chris Joseph‡	D	24	1	1	2	−4	16
1	Sean Burke	G	62	0	1	1		16
17 (Note: Nagy wore number 24 in his first five games after being acquired.)	Ladislav Nagy†	LW	6	0	1	1	0	2
2	Todd Simpson†	D	13	0	1	1	−4	12
2	David Cullen	D	2	0	0	0	1	0
29	Louie DeBrusk	LW	39	0	0	0	−5	79
14	Tavis Hansen	RW	7	0	0	0	−1	4
31	Brad Ralph	LW	1	0	0	0	0	0

=== Goaltending ===
No.	Player	Regular season									
No.	Player	GP	W	L	T	SA	GA	GAA	SV%	SO	TOI
1	Sean Burke	62	25	22	13	1766	138	2.27	.922	4	3644
42	Robert Esche	25	10	8	4	657	68	3.02	.896	2	1350

== Awards and records ==
=== Awards ===
Type	Award/honor	Recipient	Ref
League (in-season)	NHL All-Star Game selection	Sean Burke	
League (in-season)	NHL All-Star Game selection	Teppo Numminen	
League (in-season)	NHL Player of the Month	Sean Burke (October)	
Team	Hardest Working Player Award	Mike Sullivan	
Team	Leading Scorer Award	Jeremy Roenick	
Team	Man of the Year Award	Brad May	
Team	Team MVP Award	Sean Burke	
Team	Three-Star Award	Sean Burke	

=== Milestones ===
Milestone	Player	Date	Ref
First game	Brad Ralph	October 5, 2000	
First game	Ossi Vaananen	October 7, 2000	
First game	David Cullen	March 6, 2001	
25th shutout	Sean Burke	February 9, 2001	
400th goal scored	Jeremy Roenick	February 23, 2001	

== Transactions ==
The Coyotes were involved in the following transactions from June 11, 2000, the day after the deciding game of the 2000 Stanley Cup Final, through June 9, 2001, the day of the deciding game of the 2001 Stanley Cup Final.

=== Trades ===
Date	Details		Ref
June 23, 2000	To Minnesota Wild: Rights to Rickard Wallin	To Phoenix Coyotes: Joe Juneau	
June 24, 2000	To Vancouver Canucks: Future considerations	To Phoenix Coyotes: Brad May	
March 5, 2001	To Tampa Bay Lightning: Stan Neckar; Rights to Nikolai Khabibulin	To Phoenix Coyotes: Mike Johnson; Paul Mara; Ruslan Zainullin; NY Islanders’ 2nd-round pick in 2001	
March 13, 2001	To Florida Panthers: 2nd-round pick in 2001	To Phoenix Coyotes: Todd Simpson	
March 13, 2001	To St. Louis Blues: Keith Tkachuk	To Phoenix Coyotes: Michal Handzus; Ladislav Nagy; Rights to Jeff Taffe; 1st-round pick in 2002	

=== Players acquired ===
Date	Player	Former team	Term	Via	Ref
July 7, 2000	Landon Wilson	Boston Bruins	1-year	Free agency	
August 1, 2000	Justin Hocking	Toronto Maple Leafs	1-year	Free agency	
August 15, 2000	Sergei Kuznetsov	Peterborough Petes (OHL)	multi-year	Free agency	
August 31, 2000	Joel Bouchard	Dallas Stars	1-year	Free agency	
August 31, 2000	Dave MacIntyre	JYP (Liiga)	1-year	Free agency	
December 2, 2000	Claude Lemieux	New Jersey Devils	1-year	Free agency	
June 5, 2001	Martin Grenier	Victoriaville Tigres (QMJHL)	multi-year	Free agency	

=== Players lost ===
Date	Player	New team	Via (Note: In parentheses is the player's free agency group on July 1 if applicable.)	Ref
June 13, 2000	Mikael Renberg	Lulea HF (SHL)	Free agency (II) (Note: Phoenix retained Renberg’s NHL rights until trading them to the Toronto Maple Leafs on June 22, 2001.)	
June 23, 2000	Dallas Drake	Columbus Blue Jackets	Expansion draft	
June 23, 2000	Lyle Odelein	Columbus Blue Jackets	Expansion draft	
July 1, 2000	Steven King (Note: King retired.)		Contract expiration (VI)	
July 7, 2000	Sean Gagnon	Ottawa Senators	Free agency (VI)	
July 13, 2000	Kevin Sawyer	Anaheim Mighty Ducks	Free agency (VI)	
July 14, 2000	Brad Tiley	Philadelphia Flyers	Free agency (VI)	
July 19, 2000	Sean McCann	Atlanta Thrashers	Free agency (VI)	
July 24, 2000	J. J. Daigneault	Minnesota Wild	Free agency	
July 26, 2000	Bob Essensa	Vancouver Canucks	Free agency (III)	
July 28, 2000	Eric Houde	Dallas Stars	Free agency (UFA)	
August 2, 2000	David Oliver	Ottawa Senators	Free agency (UFA)	
August 9, 2000	Sylvain Daigle	Muskegon Fury (UHL)	Free agency (UFA)	
August 28, 2000	Trent Cull	Pittsburgh Penguins	Free agency (VI)	
October 22, 2000	Shayne Toporowski	Belfast Giants (BISL)	Free agency (UFA)	
November 6, 2000	Greg Adams	Florida Panthers	Free agency (III)	
January 2, 2001	Robert Schnabel	Nashville Predators	Waivers	
January 5, 2001	Benoit Hogue	Dallas Stars	Free agency (III)	
February 14, 2001	Chris Joseph	Atlanta Thrashers	Waivers	
May 25, 2001	Mika Alatalo	HC TPS (Liiga)	Free agency	

=== Signings ===
Date	Player	Term	Contract type	Ref
June 16, 2000	Mika Alatalo	1-year	Option exercised	
June 24, 2000	Brad May	multi-year	Re-signing	
June 30, 2000	Chris Joseph	1-year	Re-signing	
July 15, 2000	Ossi Vaananen	multi-year	Entry-level	
July 24, 2000	Ramzi Abid	3-year	Entry-level	
July 31, 2000	Daniel Briere	1-year	Re-signing	
July 31, 2000	Travis Green	1-year	Re-signing	
August 9, 2000	Philippe Audet	1-year	Re-signing	
August 9, 2000	Dan Focht	1-year	Re-signing	
August 15, 2000	Craig Mills	1-year	Re-signing	
August 16, 2000	Eric Healey	1-year	Re-signing	
August 21, 2000	Radoslav Suchy	3-year	Re-signing	
August 23, 2000	Brent Gauvreau	3-year	Entry-level	
August 23, 2000	Ryan Lauzon	3-year	Entry-level	
September 9, 2000	Sean Burke	1-year	Re-signing	
September 21, 2000	Jason Jaspers	3-year	Entry-level	
October 4, 2000	Brad Ralph	3-year	Entry-level	
October 13, 2000	Trevor Letowski	1-year	Re-signing	
February 26, 2001	Sean Burke	2-year	Extension	

== Draft picks ==
Phoenix's draft picks at the 2000 NHL entry draft held at the Pengrowth Saddledome in Calgary, Alberta.

Round	Pick	Player	Nationality	College/junior/club team
1	19	Krystofer Kolanos (C)	Canada	Boston College (Hockey East)
2	53	Alexander Tatarinov (RW)	Russia	Lokomotiv Yaroslavl (Russia)
3	85	Ramzi Abid (LW)	Canada	Halifax Mooseheads (QMJHL)
5	160	Nate Kiser (D)	Canada	Plymouth Whalers (OHL)
6	186	Brent Gauvreau (C)	Canada	Oshawa Generals (OHL)
7	217	Igor Samoilov (D)	Russia	Lokomotiv Yaroslavl (Russia)
8	249	Sami Venalainen (RW)	Finland	Tappara Jr. (Finland)
9	281	Peter Fabus (C)	Slovakia	Dukla Trencin (Slovakia)
