= 2000–01 Florida Panthers season =

National Hockey League team season

2000–01 Florida Panthers
- Division: 3rd Southeast
- Conference: 12th Eastern
- 2000–01 record: 22–38–13–9
- Home record: 12–18–7–4
- Road record: 10–20–6–5
- Goals for: 200
- Goals against: 246

Team information
- General manager: Bryan Murray (Oct.–Dec.); Bill Torrey (Dec.–Apr.)
- Coach: Terry Murray (Oct.–Dec.); Duane Sutter (Dec.–Apr.)
- Captain: Scott Mellanby (Oct.–Feb.); Vacant (Feb.–Apr.)
- Alternate captains: Pavel Bure; Bret Hedican; Robert Svehla
- Arena: National Car Rental Center
- Average attendance: 14,679
- Minor league affiliates: Louisville Panthers; Port Huron Border Cats

Team leaders
- Goals: Pavel Bure (59)
- Assists: Pavel Bure (33)
- Points: Pavel Bure (92)
- Penalty minutes: Peter Worrell (248)
- Plus/minus: Kevyn Adams (+7)
- Wins: Roberto Luongo (12)
- Goals against average: Roberto Luongo (2.44)

The 2000–01 Florida Panthers season was their eighth season in the National Hockey League (NHL). After making the playoffs in 2000, the Panthers failed to qualify for the playoffs in 2001 for the first time since the 1998–99 season.

== Regular season ==
After an 6–18–7–5 start, general manager Bryan Murray and head coach Terry Murray were fired on December 28. Duane Sutter was named the team’s new head coach.

=== Final standings ===
Southeast Division
No.	CR		GP	W	L	T	OTL	GF	GA	Pts
1	3	**Washington Capitals**	82	41	27	10	4	233	211	96
2	8	**Carolina Hurricanes**	82	38	32	9	3	212	225	88
3	12	Florida Panthers	82	22	38	13	9	200	246	66
4	13	Atlanta Thrashers	82	23	45	12	2	211	289	60
5	14	Tampa Bay Lightning	82	24	47	6	5	201	280	59

Note: CR = Conference rank; GP = Games played; W = Wins; L = Losses; T = Ties; OTL = Overtime loss; GF = Goals for; GA = Goals against; Pts = Points
Bolded teams qualified for the playoffs.

Eastern Conference
R		Div	GP	W	L	T	OTL	GF	GA	Pts
**1**	**Z-** New Jersey Devils	**AT**	**82**	**48**	**19**	**12**	**3**	**295**	**195**	111
**2**	**Y-** Ottawa Senators	**NE**	**82**	**48**	**21**	**9**	**4**	**274**	**205**	109
**3**	**Y-** Washington Capitals	**SE**	**82**	**41**	**27**	**10**	**4**	**233**	**211**	96
**4**	**X-** Philadelphia Flyers	**AT**	**82**	**43**	**25**	**11**	**3**	**240**	**207**	100
**5**	**X-** Buffalo Sabres	**NE**	**82**	**46**	**30**	**5**	**1**	**218**	**184**	98
**6**	**X-** Pittsburgh Penguins	**AT**	**82**	**42**	**28**	**9**	**3**	**281**	**256**	96
**7**	**X-** Toronto Maple Leafs	**NE**	**82**	**37**	**29**	**11**	**5**	**232**	**207**	90
**8**	**X-** Carolina Hurricanes	**SE**	**82**	**38**	**32**	**9**	**3**	**212**	**225**	88
8.5
9	Boston Bruins	NE	82	36	30	8	8	227	249	88
10	New York Rangers	AT	82	33	43	5	1	250	290	72
11	Montreal Canadiens	NE	82	28	40	8	6	206	232	70
12	Florida Panthers	SE	82	22	38	13	9	200	246	66
13	Atlanta Thrashers	SE	82	23	45	12	2	211	289	60
14	Tampa Bay Lightning	SE	82	24	47	6	5	201	280	59
15	New York Islanders	AT	82	21	51	7	3	185	268	52

Divisions: AT – Atlantic, NE – Northeast, SE – Southeast

Z – Clinched conference; Y – Clinched division; X – Clinched playoff spot

== Schedule and results ==
2000–01 regular season
October: 1–3–3–3 (home: 1–1–1–1; road: 0–2–2–2)

Game	Date	Score	Opponent	Record	Recap
1	October 6, 2000	3–4 OT	Vancouver Canucks (2000–01)	0–0–0–1	OTL
2	October 9, 2000	2–4	@ Boston Bruins (2000–01)	0–1–0–1	L
3	October 13, 2000	2–2 OT	Carolina Hurricanes (2000–01)	0–1–1–1	T
4	October 18, 2000	1–2 OT	@ Phoenix Coyotes (2000–01)	0–1–1–2	OTL
5	October 20, 2000	1–5	@ Colorado Avalanche (2000–01)	0–2–1–2	L
6	October 22, 2000	0–0 OT	@ Minnesota Wild (2000–01)	0–2–2–2	T
7	October 25, 2000	1–2	New Jersey Devils (2000–01)	0–3–2–2	L
8	October 27, 2000	3–3 OT	@ Nashville Predators (2000–01)	0–3–3–2	T
9	October 28, 2000	3–1	Ottawa Senators (2000–01)	1–3–3–2	W
10	October 30, 2000	5–6 OT	@ New Jersey Devils (2000–01)	1–3–3–3	OTL

November: 4–6–1–1 (home: 1–4–1–1; road: 3–2–0–0)

Game	Date	Score	Opponent	Record	Recap
11	November 1, 2000	0–3	New York Islanders (2000–01)	1–4–3–3	L
12	November 4, 2000	2–3	Washington Capitals (2000–01)	1–5–3–3	L
13	November 8, 2000	2–4	Montreal Canadiens (2000–01)	1–6–3–3	L
14	November 10, 2000	3–3 OT	Calgary Flames (2000–01)	1–6–4–3	T
15	November 13, 2000	1–4	Atlanta Thrashers (2000–01)	1–7–4–3	L
16	November 15, 2000	4–1	@ Carolina Hurricanes (2000–01)	2–7–4–3	W
17	November 17, 2000	3–0	@ Columbus Blue Jackets (2000–01)	3–7–4–3	W
18	November 18, 2000	2–5	@ Ottawa Senators (2000–01)	3–8–4–3	L
19	November 21, 2000	4–1	@ Montreal Canadiens (2000–01)	4–8–4–3	W
20	November 24, 2000	1–2	@ Tampa Bay Lightning (2000–01)	4–9–4–3	L
21	November 25, 2000	2–1 OT	Tampa Bay Lightning (2000–01)	5–9–4–3	W
22	November 29, 2000	1–2 OT	Carolina Hurricanes (2000–01)	5–9–4–4	OTL

December: 2–10–3–1 (home: 1–6–1–0; road: 1–4–2–1)

Game	Date	Score	Opponent	Record	Recap
23	December 1, 2000	1–3	Detroit Red Wings (2000–01)	5–10–4–4	L
24	December 2, 2000	2–5	@ St. Louis Blues (2000–01)	5–11–4–4	L
25	December 4, 2000	4–4 OT	@ Toronto Maple Leafs (2000–01)	5–11–5–4	T
26	December 6, 2000	1–4	New York Islanders (2000–01)	5–12–5–4	L
27	December 8, 2000	3–4 OT	@ Atlanta Thrashers (2000–01)	5–12–5–5	OTL
28	December 9, 2000	2–4	Colorado Avalanche (2000–01)	5–13–5–5	L
29	December 13, 2000	3–3 OT	@ Detroit Red Wings (2000–01)	5–13–6–5	T
30	December 15, 2000	4–1	@ Pittsburgh Penguins (2000–01)	6–13–6–5	W
31	December 16, 2000	2–3	@ Buffalo Sabres (2000–01)	6–14–6–5	L
32	December 18, 2000	3–6	@ New York Rangers (2000–01)	6–15–6–5	L
33	December 20, 2000	2–2 OT	Pittsburgh Penguins (2000–01)	6–15–7–5	T
34	December 22, 2000	0–2	New Jersey Devils (2000–01)	6–16–7–5	L
35	December 23, 2000	3–5	@ Washington Capitals (2000–01)	6–17–7–5	L
36	December 27, 2000	2–5	Philadelphia Flyers (2000–01)	6–18–7–5	L
37	December 29, 2000	3–0	Boston Bruins (2000–01)	7–18–7–5	W
38	December 30, 2000	1–4	Toronto Maple Leafs (2000–01)	7–19–7–5	L

January: 5–8–1–2 (home: 3–1–1–1; road: 2–7–0–1)

Game	Date	Score	Opponent	Record	Recap
39	January 3, 2001	2–3 OT	@ Mighty Ducks of Anaheim (2000–01)	7–19–7–6	OTL
40	January 4, 2001	4–3	@ Los Angeles Kings (2000–01)	8–19–7–6	W
41	January 6, 2001	1–3	@ San Jose Sharks (2000–01)	8–20–7–6	L
42	January 9, 2001	3–7	@ Carolina Hurricanes (2000–01)	8–21–7–6	L
43	January 12, 2001	2–2 OT	Carolina Hurricanes (2000–01)	8–21–8–6	T
44	January 13, 2001	1–4	Philadelphia Flyers (2000–01)	8–22–8–6	L
45	January 15, 2001	2–0	Dallas Stars (2000–01)	9–22–8–6	W
46	January 17, 2001	0–5	@ Chicago Blackhawks (2000–01)	9–23–8–6	L
47	January 19, 2001	0–1	@ Buffalo Sabres (2000–01)	9–24–8–6	L
48	January 20, 2001	3–5	@ Philadelphia Flyers (2000–01)	9–25–8–6	L
49	January 22, 2001	3–2	@ Boston Bruins (2000–01)	10–25–8–6	W
50	January 24, 2001	1–2	@ Washington Capitals (2000–01)	10–26–8–6	L
51	January 26, 2001	4–5 OT	Ottawa Senators (2000–01)	10–26–8–7	OTL
52	January 27, 2001	3–2 OT	Tampa Bay Lightning (2000–01)	11–26–8–7	W
53	January 30, 2001	3–4	@ Tampa Bay Lightning (2000–01)	11–27–8–7	L
54	January 31, 2001	5–2	Buffalo Sabres (2000–01)	12–27–8–7	W

February: 5–5–0–1 (home: 4–1–0–0; road: 1–4–0–1)

Game	Date	Score	Opponent	Record	Recap
55	February 7, 2001	2–1	Minnesota Wild (2000–01)	13–27–8–7	W
56	February 9, 2001	2–4	New York Rangers (2000–01)	13–28–8–7	L
57	February 10, 2001	7–3	@ Atlanta Thrashers (2000–01)	14–28–8–7	W
58	February 14, 2001	4–3	Phoenix Coyotes (2000–01)	15–28–8–7	W
59	February 16, 2001	2–1	Boston Bruins (2000–01)	16–28–8–7	W
60	February 19, 2001	3–0	St. Louis Blues (2000–01)	17–28–8–7	W
61	February 21, 2001	2–3 OT	@ Pittsburgh Penguins (2000–01)	17–28–8–8	OTL
62	February 22, 2001	2–4	@ Ottawa Senators (2000–01)	17–29–8–8	L
63	February 24, 2001	4–5	@ New York Islanders (2000–01)	17–30–8–8	L
64	February 26, 2001	3–5	@ New Jersey Devils (2000–01)	17–31–8–8	L
65	February 28, 2001	2–4	@ New York Rangers (2000–01)	17–32–8–8	L

March: 3–4–5–1 (home: 1–4–3–1; road: 2–0–2–0)

Game	Date	Score	Opponent	Record	Recap
66	March 2, 2001	3–4	Atlanta Thrashers (2000–01)	17–33–8–8	L
67	March 3, 2001	2–2 OT	@ Atlanta Thrashers (2000–01)	17–33–9–8	T
68	March 7, 2001	3–3 OT	San Jose Sharks (2000–01)	17–33–10–8	T
69	March 9, 2001	6–7 OT	Columbus Blue Jackets (2000–01)	17–33–10–9	OTL
70	March 11, 2001	4–1	@ New York Islanders (2000–01)	18–33–10–9	W
71	March 14, 2001	2–2 OT	Edmonton Oilers (2000–01)	18–33–11–9	T
72	March 16, 2001	3–6	Pittsburgh Penguins (2000–01)	18–34–11–9	L
73	March 17, 2001	3–5	Toronto Maple Leafs (2000–01)	18–35–11–9	L
74	March 20, 2001	3–3 OT	@ Montreal Canadiens (2000–01)	18–35–12–9	T
75	March 21, 2001	3–1	@ Toronto Maple Leafs (2000–01)	19–35–12–9	W
76	March 23, 2001	4–1	Washington Capitals (2000–01)	20–35–12–9	W
77	March 28, 2001	2–2 OT	Montreal Canadiens (2000–01)	20–35–13–9	T
78	March 30, 2001	2–4	Tampa Bay Lightning (2000–01)	20–36–13–9	L

April: 2–2–0–0 (home: 1–1–0–0; road: 1–1–0–0)

Game	Date	Score	Opponent	Record	Recap
79	April 2, 2001	3–5	Buffalo Sabres (2000–01)	20–37–13–9	L
80	April 3, 2001	2–1	@ Philadelphia Flyers (2000–01)	21–37–13–9	W
81	April 5, 2001	0–3	@ Washington Capitals (2000–01)	21–38–13–9	L
82	April 7, 2001	3–0	New York Rangers (2000–01)	22–38–13–9	W

Legend: W Win (2 points) L Loss (0 points) T Tie (1 point) OTL Overtime loss (1 point)

== Player statistics ==
=== Scoring ===
- Position abbreviations: C = Center; D = Defense; G = Goaltender; LW = Left wing; RW = Right wing
- † = Joined team via a transaction (e.g., trade, waivers, signing) during the season. Stats reflect time with the Panthers only.
- ‡ = Left team via a transaction (e.g., trade, waivers, release) during the season. Stats reflect time with the Panthers only.

No.	Player	Pos	Regular season					
No.	Player	Pos	GP	G	A	Pts	+/-	PIM
10	Pavel Bure	RW	82	59	33	92	−2	58
25	Viktor Kozlov	C	51	14	23	37	−4	10
18	Marcus Nilson	LW	78	12	24	36	−3	74
16	Mike Sillinger‡	C	55	13	21	34	−12	44
44	Rob Niedermayer	C	67	12	20	32	−12	50
14	Ray Whitney‡	LW	43	10	21	31	−16	28
24	Robert Svehla	D	82	6	22	28	−8	76
17	Greg Adams†	LW	60	11	12	23	−3	10
9 (Note: Barrie wore number 19 in his first 29 games.)	Len Barrie	C	60	5	18	23	4	135
26	Dan Boyle	D	69	4	18	22	−14	28
29	Anders Eriksson†	D	60	0	21	21	2	28
4	Bret Hedican	D	70	5	15	20	−7	72
12	Olli Jokinen	C	78	6	10	16	−22	106
21	Denis Shvidki	RW	43	6	10	16	6	16
13	Vaclav Prospal†	C	34	4	12	16	−2	10
27	Scott Mellanby‡	RW	40	4	9	13	−13	46
9	Igor Larionov‡	C	26	5	6	11	−11	10
8	Peter Worrell	LW	71	3	7	10	−10	248
11	Kevyn Adams†	C	12	3	6	9	7	2
39	Ivan Novoseltsev	RW	38	3	6	9	−5	16
19 (Note: Payer wore number 68 in his first two games and then wore number 41 through January 9.)	Serge Payer	C	43	5	1	6	0	21
36	Joey Tetarenko	RW	29	3	1	4	−1	44
22	Todd Simpson‡	D	25	1	3	4	0	74
28	Jaroslav Spacek‡	D	12	2	1	3	−4	8
15	John Jakopin	D	60	1	2	3	−4	62
3	Paul Laus	D	25	1	2	3	5	66
2	Lance Pitlick	D	68	1	2	3	−5	42
5	Yan Golubovsky†	D	6	0	2	2	3	2
49 (Note: Ward wore number 47 on January 12.)	Lance Ward	D	30	0	2	2	−3	45
41	Andrej Podkonicky†	C	6	1	0	1	0	2
45 (Note: Ference wore number 5 in his first nine games.)	Brad Ference	D	14	0	1	1	−10	14
37	Trevor Kidd	G	42	0	1	1		6
7	Mike Wilson	D	19	0	1	1	−7	25
43	Paul Brousseau	RW	1	0	0	0	0	0
43	David Emma‡	C	6	0	0	0	−1	0
1	Roberto Luongo	G	47	0	0	0		2
35	Peter Ratchuk	D	8	0	0	0	−1	0
23	Rocky Thompson	D	4	0	0	0	0	19

=== Goaltending ===
No.	Player	Regular season									
No.	Player	GP	W	L	T	SA	GA	GAA	SV%	SO	TOI
1	Roberto Luongo	47	12	24	7	1333	107	2.44	.920	5	2628
37	Trevor Kidd	42	10	23	6	1217	130	3.31	.893	1	2354

== Awards and records ==
=== Awards ===
Type	Award/honor	Recipient	Ref
League (annual)	Maurice "Rocket" Richard Trophy	Pavel Bure	
League (annual)	NHL Second All-Star Team	Pavel Bure (Right wing)	
League (in-season)	NHL All-Star Game selection	Pavel Bure (Note: Bure was voted to the starting lineup.)	

=== Milestones ===
Milestone	Player	Date	Ref
First game	Denis Shvidki	October 6, 2000	
First game	Joey Tetarenko	October 27, 2000	
First game	Serge Payer	November 13, 2000	
First game	Lance Ward	November 15, 2000	
First game	Andrej Podkonicky	March 14, 2001	
1,000th game played	Greg Adams	November 15, 2000	

== Transactions ==
The Panthers were involved in the following transactions from June 11, 2000, the day after the deciding game of the 2000 Stanley Cup Final, through June 9, 2001, the day of the deciding game of the 2001 Stanley Cup Final.

=== Trades ===
Date	Details		Ref
June 24, 2000	To Florida Panthers: Olli Jokinen; Roberto Luongo	To New York Islanders: Oleg Kvasha; Mark Parrish	
June 25, 2000	To Florida Panthers: 9th-round pick in 2001	To Columbus Blue Jackets: 9th-round pick in 2000	
November 7, 2000	To Florida Panthers: Anders Eriksson	To Chicago Blackhawks: Jaroslav Spacek	
December 17, 2000	To Florida Panthers: Andrej Podkonicky	To St. Louis Blues: Eric Boguniecki	
December 28, 2000	To Florida Panthers: Yan Golubovsky	To Detroit Red Wings: Igor Larionov	
January 20, 2001	To Florida Panthers: Vaclav Prospal	To Ottawa Senators: Choice of a 3rd or 4th-round pick (Note: The Panthers had the choice of sending Ottawa a fourth-round pick in 2001 or a third-round pick in 2002. This draft pick was ultimately re-acquired from Ottawa on March 13 for Mike Sillinger.)	
February 9, 2001	To Florida Panthers: Rights to David Morisset; 5th-round pick in 2002	To St. Louis Blues: Scott Mellanby	
March 3, 2001	To Florida Panthers: Future considerations	To Colorado Avalanche: Brent Thompson	
March 3, 2001	To Florida Panthers: Remi Royer	To Washington Capitals: David Emma	
March 13, 2001	To Florida Panthers: Kevyn Adams; Conditional draft pick (Note: The Panthers choice of a 2001 compensatory pick or a 2002 4th-round pick.)	To Columbus Blue Jackets: Ray Whitney	
March 13, 2001	To Florida Panthers: Returned draft options	To Ottawa Senators: Mike Sillinger	
March 13, 2001	To Florida Panthers: 2nd-round pick in 2001	To Phoenix Coyotes: Todd Simpson	
May 31, 2001	To Florida Panthers: Conditional draft pick in 2001 (Note: The Panthers would receive either the compensatory draft pick Vancouver received for losing Mark Messier as a free agent in July 2000, or they had the option to receive a 2nd-round pick in 2002.); 3rd-round pick in 2002	To Vancouver Canucks: Rights to Alex Auld	

=== Players acquired ===
Date	Player	Former team	Term	Via	Ref
July 1, 2000	Igor Larionov	Detroit Red Wings	1-year (Note: Club option for a second year.)	Free agency	
August 1, 2000	David Emma	EC KAC (Austria)		Free agency	
August 1, 2000	Michel Periard	Rimouski Oceanic (QMJHL)		Free agency	
October 7, 2000	Maxim Galanov	Atlanta Thrashers		Free agency	
November 7, 2000	Greg Adams	Phoenix Coyotes	1-year	Free agency	
December 16, 2000	Travis Brigley	Cardiff Devils (BISL)		Free agency	

=== Players lost ===
Date	Player	New team	Via (Note: In parentheses is the player's free agency group on July 1 if applicable.)	Ref
N/A	Craig Reichert	Dusseldorf EG (DEL)	Free agency (VI)	
June 23, 2000	Cam Stewart	Minnesota Wild	Expansion draft	
June 23, 2000	Mike Vernon	Minnesota Wild	Expansion draft	
June 30, 2000	Craig Ferguson	HC Fribourg-Gotteron (NLA)	Release	
August 28, 2000	Alex Hicks	Eisbaren Berlin (DEL)	Free agency (UFA)	
September 5, 2000	Mikhail Shtalenkov	HC Dynamo Moscow (RSL)	Free agency (III)	
N/A	Andrew Long	Hamilton Bulldogs (AHL)	Free agency (UFA)	
October 5, 2000	Jeff Ware	Syracuse Crunch (AHL)	Free agency (UFA)	
October 7, 2000	Chad Cabana	Providence Bruins (AHL)	Free agency (VI)	
November 3, 2000	Maxim Galanov	Tampa Bay Lightning	Waivers	
December 21, 2000	Ray Sheppard	SCL Tigers (NLA)	Free agency (III)	

=== Signings ===
Date	Player	Term	Contract type	Ref
June 14, 2000	Denis Shvidki		Entry-level	
July 28, 2000	Rob Niedermayer	1-year	Re-signing	
August 3, 2000	Eric Boguniecki	1-year	Re-signing	
August 3, 2000	Dan Boyle	1-year	Re-signing	
August 3, 2000	Paul Brousseau	1-year	Re-signing	
August 3, 2000	Dave Duerden	1-year	Re-signing	
August 3, 2000	Joey Tetarenko	1-year	Re-signing	
August 3, 2000	Rocky Thompson	1-year	Re-signing	
August 9, 2000	Ray Whitney	3-year	Re-signing	
September 21, 2000	Peter Worrell	3-year	Re-signing	
October 16, 2000	Paul Laus	3-year	Extension	
April 18, 2001	Sean O'Connor		Entry-level	

== Draft picks ==
Florida's draft picks at the 2000 NHL entry draft held at the Pengrowth Saddledome in Calgary, Alberta.

Round	#	Player	Nationality	College/Junior/Club team (League)
2	58	Vladimir Sapozhnikov	Russia	Metallurg Novokuznetsk (Russia)
3	77	Robert Fried	United States	Deerfield Academy (USHS-MA)
3	82	Sean O'Connor	Canada	Moose Jaw Warriors (WHL)
4	115	Chris Eade	Canada	North Bay Centennials (OHL)
4	120	Davis Parley	Canada	Kamloops Blazers (WHL)
6	190	Josh Olson	United States	Omaha Lancers (USHL)
8	234	Janis Sprukts	Latvia	Lukko Jr. (Finland)
8	253	Matthew Sommerfeld	Canada	Swift Current Broncos (WHL)

== See also ==
- 2000–01 NHL season
