= 2000–01 Buffalo Sabres season =

NHL hockey team season

2000–01 Buffalo Sabres
- Division: 2nd Northeast
- Conference: 5th Eastern
- 2000–01 record: 46–30–5–1
- Home record: 26–12–3–0
- Road record: 20–18–2–1
- Goals for: 218
- Goals against: 184

Team information
- General manager: Darcy Regier
- Coach: Lindy Ruff
- Captain: Vacant (Note: Michael Peca, the previous captain, sat out the entire season due to a contract dispute.)
- Alternate captains: Doug Gilmour; Rob Ray; Rotating
- Arena: HSBC Arena
- Average attendance: 17,839
- Minor league affiliates: Rochester Americans; South Carolina Stingrays; B.C. Icemen

Team leaders
- Goals: Miroslav Satan (29)
- Assists: Miroslav Satan (33)
- Points: Miroslav Satan (62)
- Penalty minutes: Rob Ray (210)
- Plus/minus: Curtis Brown (+15)
- Wins: Dominik Hasek (37)
- Goals against average: Dominik Hasek (2.11)

The 2000–01 Buffalo Sabres season was the 31st season for the team in the National Hockey League (NHL). The Sabres finished with a 46–30–5–1 record in the regular season, and won the Conference Quarterfinals (4–2) over the Philadelphia Flyers, but lost the Conference Semifinals (4–3) to the Pittsburgh Penguins. It was also the final time they made the playoffs before the 2004–05 NHL lockout.

== Regular season ==
The Sabres allowed the fewest goals (184), had the most shutouts (13), allowed the fewest power-play goals (40) and had the best penalty-kill percentage (88.02%).

=== Final standings ===
Northeast Division
No.	CR		GP	W	L	T	OTL	GF	GA	Pts
1	2	**Ottawa Senators**	82	48	21	9	4	274	205	109
2	5	**Buffalo Sabres**	82	46	30	5	1	218	184	98
3	7	**Toronto Maple Leafs**	82	37	29	11	5	232	207	90
4	9	Boston Bruins	82	36	30	8	8	227	249	88
5	11	Montreal Canadiens	82	28	40	8	6	206	232	70

Note: CR = Conference rank; GP = Games played; W = Wins; L = Losses; T = Ties; OTL=Overtime loss; GF = Goals for; GA = Goals against; Pts = Points
Bolded teams qualified for the playoffs.

Eastern Conference
R		Div	GP	W	L	T	OTL	GF	GA	Pts
**1**	**Z-** New Jersey Devils	**AT**	**82**	**48**	**19**	**12**	**3**	**295**	**195**	111
**2**	**Y-** Ottawa Senators	**NE**	**82**	**48**	**21**	**9**	**4**	**274**	**205**	109
**3**	**Y-** Washington Capitals	**SE**	**82**	**41**	**27**	**10**	**4**	**233**	**211**	96
**4**	**X-** Philadelphia Flyers	**AT**	**82**	**43**	**25**	**11**	**3**	**240**	**207**	100
**5**	**X-** Buffalo Sabres	**NE**	**82**	**46**	**30**	**5**	**1**	**218**	**184**	98
**6**	**X-** Pittsburgh Penguins	**AT**	**82**	**42**	**28**	**9**	**3**	**281**	**256**	96
**7**	**X-** Toronto Maple Leafs	**NE**	**82**	**37**	**29**	**11**	**5**	**232**	**207**	90
**8**	**X-** Carolina Hurricanes	**SE**	**82**	**38**	**32**	**9**	**3**	**212**	**225**	88
8.5
9	Boston Bruins	NE	82	36	30	8	8	227	249	88
10	New York Rangers	AT	82	33	43	5	1	250	290	72
11	Montreal Canadiens	NE	82	28	40	8	6	206	232	70
12	Florida Panthers	SE	82	22	38	13	9	200	246	66
13	Atlanta Thrashers	SE	82	23	45	12	2	211	289	60
14	Tampa Bay Lightning	SE	82	24	47	6	5	201	280	59
15	New York Islanders	AT	82	21	51	7	3	185	268	52

Divisions: AT – Atlantic, NE – Northeast, SE – Southeast

Z – Clinched conference; Y – Clinched division; X – Clinched playoff spot

== Playoffs ==
=== (4) Philadelphia Flyers vs. (5) Buffalo Sabres ===
The Flyers were entering this year's playoffs still trying to forget the Eastern Conference finals the previous year. In 2000, they had a 3–1 series lead against the eventual Stanley Cup champion New Jersey Devils, but lost the next three. Head coach Craig Ramsay was fired in the middle of the season, with general manager Bobby Clarke explaining his decision was based on the fact his Flyers were not "tough enough". As Ramsay's replacement, Clarke hired former teammate Bill Barber. The Sabres season was not as complicated, as head coach Lindy Ruff led his Sabres to one of their best regular seasons in recent history. In the playoffs, the two teams had met three times in four years, with the most recent series ending in with a Flyers win. The Sabres would look for revenge in the city of brotherly love.

The Flyers were was stopped by Dominik Hasek and the Sabres in the first two games, one of which was ended by a Jay McKee overtime goal. The Flyers came out in Game 3 determined to win a game, and they did by one goal. The Flyers then lost again to the Sabres in Game 4 in overtime after Curtis Brown beat goaltender Roman Cechmanek, which put the Sabres in a 3-1 series lead.

The Flyers won in Game 5 by a two-goal margin to stave off elimination, which was marred by Hasek accusing Flyers centre Keith Primeau of attempting to injure him; Primeau was jostling with Sabres defenceman James Patrick before crashing into Hasek. Primeau went unpenalized while Hasek earned a 10-minute misconduct for his outburst with officials. The Sabres routed the Flyers in Game 6 scoring eight goals, five of which were surrendered by Cechmanek, who was replaced early by Brian Boucher, who himself conceded three goals, which was also due to the Flyers defensemen pairing led by Éric Desjardins being overworked that series to exhaustion. Hasek recorded another shutout, as the Sabres progressed to the conference semifinals.

=== (5) Buffalo Sabres vs. (6) Pittsburgh Penguins ===
Entering the series, Buffalo held the best penalty killing (PK) squad which killed 88%, and Pittsburgh entered the series with the fifth best powerplay (PP) squad, which scored on 20% of its opportunities. However, the Buffalo PK and the Pittsburgh PP would underachieve during the series: Pittsburgh only scored 4 times on 27 opportunities (14%), so, consequently, Buffalo's PK percent dropped to 86. Buffalo also scored four power play goals, but on 33 chances (12%).

The Sabres and Penguins had evenly matched goaltending: Pittsburgh goaltenders saved 155 shots out of 172 (90.2%), and Buffalo's saved 166 shots out of 183 (90.8%). Both teams scored 17 goals during the series, and they also scored the same number of power play goals, four.

The Sabres just could not put the puck past Johan Hedberg in Game 1, with the Penguins needing only star center Mario Lemieux's first-period goal to finish off Buffalo and take an early series lead. Dominik Hasek gave up three goals, the other two of which came courtesy of centers Wayne Primeau and Jan Hrdina in the second half of the third period. Penguins winger Jaromir Jagr, who assisted on the Lemieux goal in the first period, injured his leg in the third period and would miss Game 2. Both teams were rather inept on the powerplay, wasting five conversion opportunities each.

In Game 2, the first period had no scoring, despite five different powerplays for the two teams. Then, about halfway through the second period, Penguins center Robert Lang scored a goal to give the Penguins a 1–0. Three minutes later, Sabres center Stu Barnes tied the game with the game's only powerplay goal. In the third period, Pittsburgh would score two more goals through defenceman Andrew Ference and an empty-netter by Alexei Kovalev.

For the second consecutive game, there were no goals scored in the first period of Game 3, despite a combined 17 shots on goal. The Penguins scored on the power play in the second period to take the lead, but Sabres center Curtis Brown would tie the game through an even-strength goal as the period would end at 1–1. Johan Hedberg had been solid in the net for the Penguins, but conceded 3 goals from just 11 shots in the third period. At about the halfway point in the third period, Sabres defenseman Jason Woolley scored the go-ahead goal, and three minutes later, Miroslav Satan would score another goal to give Buffalo a two-goal lead. Defenseman James Patrick finished off the game with an empty-net goal to send the Sabres to a 4–1 victory in Game 3.

Building off the road win in Game 3, Buffalo scored the first goal in Game 4 very early in the first period by center Jean-Pierre Dumont, but the Penguins would respond with a powerplay goal by center Martin Straka. Sabres center Curtis Brown scored a short-handed goal late in the first period to give Buffalo the edge heading into the locker rooms. The second period featured only one goal by Janne Laukkanen, set up by Jagr and Lemieux, and the game was tied up going into the third. Stu Barnes scored twice in the third period, and the Sabres went on to win the game by three, five goals to two. Both teams were effective on the powerplay, each scoring one goal on two chances. Coming off two straight home losses, Buffalo works hard on the road to swipe the two home games back, swinging the series back to Buffalo's advantage.

Penguins wingman Jaromir Jagr initiated the scoring in game five with a powerplay goal, the only goal in the first period. Pittsburgh would tack on another goal early on in the second period by winger Aleksey Morozov, but Sabres center Chris Gratton would respond with a powerplay goal, and the Penguins still had the lead until they gave up another short-handed goal to Curtis Brown. Curtis Brown's goal forced overtime, and Stu Barnes would score the game-winning goal to give Buffalo the series lead. The Sabres were down by two goals early but fought back and won the game by scoring three unanswered goals. Game five was the first overtime game in the string of three that would end the series.

Buffalo's right winger Maxim Afinogenov scored in the first half of the first period of game six to give the Sabres and early lead, a lead the team would need because Pittsburgh's Alexei Kovalev tied the game up early in the second period. Donald Audette would break up the tied game with an even-strength goal late in the second period. Pittsburgh would persevere and score the tying goal with less than a minute to go in the third period courtesy of Mario Lemieux, so this match headed to overtime. Martin Straka was the hero of the Penguins on that night, as he scored the game-winning goal about halfway through the overtime period. Both teams didn't score on any of the combined seven chances they saw, and the fabled game seven was due.

In game seven, the first period was an uneventful one, featuring no goals and few penalties, but the second period was a different story. Buffalo struck first as Jean-Pierre Dumont scored very early in the period, but that one-goal lead wouldn't last because Andrew Ference scored a powerplay goal to even things up at one goal apiece. Just about 30 seconds into the third period, Buffalo struck again as winger Steve Heinze scored a powerplay goal. Robert Lang would then score to tie the game up at two goals apiece. With a minute remaining in the third period and the Sabres applying pressure in the Penguins zone, Penguins defenceman Darius Kasparaitis grabbed the puck and threw it over the boards into the crowd. No penalty was called on the play and the game went to overtime. Later, Kasparaitis would win the game and the series for the Penguins as he scored off of passes from Jagr and Lang. Pittsburgh went on to face the New Jersey Devils in the conference finals.

== Schedule and results ==
=== Regular season ===
2000–01 regular season
October: 5–3–1–1 (home: 4–0–1–0; road: 1–3–0–1)

Game	Date	Score	Opponent	Record	Recap
1	October 5, 2000	4–2	Chicago Blackhawks (2000–01)	1–0–0–0	W
2	October 7, 2000	5–3	Los Angeles Kings (2000–01)	2–0–0–0	W
3	October 13, 2000	2–3	@ Edmonton Oilers (2000–01)	2–1–0–0	L
4	October 14, 2000	0–4	@ Vancouver Canucks (2000–01)	2–2–0–0	L
5	October 17, 2000	3–4	@ Montreal Canadiens (2000–01)	2–3–0–0	L
6	October 20, 2000	2–2 OT	Mighty Ducks of Anaheim (2000–01)	2–3–1–0	T
7	October 21, 2000	4–5 OT	@ Detroit Red Wings (2000–01)	2–3–1–1	OTL
8	October 25, 2000	4–1	Carolina Hurricanes (2000–01)	3–3–1–1	W
9	October 27, 2000	2–1	Toronto Maple Leafs (2000–01)	4–3–1–1	W
10	October 28, 2000	3–1	@ Chicago Blackhawks (2000–01)	5–3–1–1	W

November: 7–4–1–0 (home: 5–1–1–0; road: 2–3–0–0)

Game	Date	Score	Opponent	Record	Recap
11	November 3, 2000	5–4	Montreal Canadiens (2000–01)	6–3–1–1	W
12	November 4, 2000	0–3	@ Philadelphia Flyers (2000–01)	6–4–1–1	L
13	November 9, 2000	3–0	New York Islanders (2000–01)	7–4–1–1	W
14	November 11, 2000	4–0	@ New Jersey Devils (2000–01)	8–4–1–1	W
15	November 13, 2000	3–2 OT	Calgary Flames (2000–01)	9–4–1–1	W
16	November 15, 2000	2–2 OT	Dallas Stars (2000–01)	9–4–2–1	T
17	November 17, 2000	3–1	Minnesota Wild (2000–01)	10–4–2–1	W
18	November 18, 2000	1–4	@ St. Louis Blues (2000–01)	10–5–2–1	L
19	November 22, 2000	1–3	Philadelphia Flyers (2000–01)	10–6–2–1	L
20	November 24, 2000	3–2	New York Rangers (2000–01)	11–6–2–1	W
21	November 25, 2000	5–3	@ Montreal Canadiens (2000–01)	12–6–2–1	W
22	November 28, 2000	1–3	@ Ottawa Senators (2000–01)	12–7–2–1	L

December: 8–5–1–0 (home: 4–3–0–0; road: 4–2–1–0)

Game	Date	Score	Opponent	Record	Recap
23	December 1, 2000	4–6	Pittsburgh Penguins (2000–01)	12–8–2–1	L
24	December 2, 2000	3–2	@ Pittsburgh Penguins (2000–01)	13–8–2–1	W
25	December 5, 2000	3–2	@ Montreal Canadiens (2000–01)	14–8–2–1	W
26	December 7, 2000	5–2	New Jersey Devils (2000–01)	15–8–2–1	W
27	December 8, 2000	2–5	@ New York Rangers (2000–01)	15–9–2–1	L
28	December 12, 2000	3–0	@ Boston Bruins (2000–01)	16–9–2–1	W
29	December 15, 2000	3–5	@ Carolina Hurricanes (2000–01)	16–10–2–1	L
30	December 16, 2000	3–2	Florida Panthers (2000–01)	17–10–2–1	W
31	December 20, 2000	2–2 OT	@ Washington Capitals (2000–01)	17–10–3–1	T
32	December 21, 2000	1–3	Washington Capitals (2000–01)	17–11–3–1	L
33	December 23, 2000	5–2	San Jose Sharks (2000–01)	18–11–3–1	W
34	December 26, 2000	3–5	Pittsburgh Penguins (2000–01)	18–12–3–1	L
35	December 29, 2000	2–0	Ottawa Senators (2000–01)	19–12–3–1	W
36	December 30, 2000	2–0	@ New York Islanders (2000–01)	20–12–3–1	W

January: 5–7–2–0 (home: 2–3–1–0; road: 3–4–1–0)

Game	Date	Score	Opponent	Record	Recap
37	January 1, 2001	3–4	Boston Bruins (2000–01)	20–13–3–1	L
38	January 3, 2001	1–1 OT	@ Toronto Maple Leafs (2000–01)	20–13–4–1	T
39	January 5, 2001	3–3 OT	Toronto Maple Leafs (2000–01)	20–13–5–1	T
40	January 6, 2001	2–0	@ Nashville Predators (2000–01)	21–13–5–1	W
41	January 9, 2001	1–2	@ San Jose Sharks (2000–01)	21–14–5–1	L
42	January 11, 2001	2–3	@ Los Angeles Kings (2000–01)	21–15–5–1	L
43	January 12, 2001	4–0	@ Mighty Ducks of Anaheim (2000–01)	22–15–5–1	W
44	January 16, 2001	3–1	Tampa Bay Lightning (2000–01)	23–15–5–1	W
45	January 19, 2001	1–0	Florida Panthers (2000–01)	24–15–5–1	W
46	January 20, 2001	0–2	@ Toronto Maple Leafs (2000–01)	24–16–5–1	L
47	January 23, 2001	1–2	Columbus Blue Jackets (2000–01)	24–17–5–1	L
48	January 26, 2001	1–2	Boston Bruins (2000–01)	24–18–5–1	L
49	January 27, 2001	2–1	@ New York Islanders (2000–01)	25–18–5–1	W
50	January 31, 2001	2–5	@ Florida Panthers (2000–01)	25–19–5–1	L

February: 9–4–0–0 (home: 5–2–0–0; road: 4–2–0–0)

Game	Date	Score	Opponent	Record	Recap
51	February 1, 2001	2–4	@ Tampa Bay Lightning (2000–01)	25–20–5–1	L
52	February 6, 2001	6–3	@ New York Rangers (2000–01)	26–20–5–1	W
53	February 7, 2001	2–1 OT	New York Islanders (2000–01)	27–20–5–1	W
54	February 10, 2001	2–1 OT	@ Ottawa Senators (2000–01)	28–20–5–1	W
55	February 11, 2001	3–4	Montreal Canadiens (2000–01)	28–21–5–1	L
56	February 13, 2001	4–5	@ Atlanta Thrashers (2000–01)	28–22–5–1	L
57	February 15, 2001	3–1	Atlanta Thrashers (2000–01)	29–22–5–1	W
58	February 17, 2001	5–1	New Jersey Devils (2000–01)	30–22–5–1	W
59	February 19, 2001	2–0	Ottawa Senators (2000–01)	31–22–5–1	W
60	February 22, 2001	1–0	@ New Jersey Devils (2000–01)	32–22–5–1	W
61	February 23, 2001	3–7	Phoenix Coyotes (2000–01)	32–23–5–1	L
62	February 25, 2001	5–4	Tampa Bay Lightning (2000–01)	33–23–5–1	W
63	February 27, 2001	4–1	@ Ottawa Senators (2000–01)	34–23–5–1	W

March: 9–5–0–0 (home: 5–1–0–0; road: 4–4–0–0)

Game	Date	Score	Opponent	Record	Recap
64	March 1, 2001	0–2	@ Philadelphia Flyers (2000–01)	34–24–5–1	L
65	March 3, 2001	3–2 OT	@ Colorado Avalanche (2000–01)	35–24–5–1	W
66	March 4, 2001	1–4	@ Dallas Stars (2000–01)	35–25–5–1	L
67	March 6, 2001	3–1	@ Boston Bruins (2000–01)	36–25–5–1	W
68	March 9, 2001	0–4	Edmonton Oilers (2000–01)	36–26–5–1	L
69	March 14, 2001	6–3	New York Rangers (2000–01)	37–26–5–1	W
70	March 16, 2001	4–2	Vancouver Canucks (2000–01)	38–26–5–1	W
71	March 17, 2001	3–2	@ Washington Capitals (2000–01)	39–26–5–1	W
72	March 20, 2001	3–0	Toronto Maple Leafs (2000–01)	40–26–5–1	W
73	March 21, 2001	0–1	@ Carolina Hurricanes (2000–01)	40–27–5–1	L
74	March 24, 2001	3–1	Carolina Hurricanes (2000–01)	41–27–5–1	W
75	March 26, 2001	4–0	@ Atlanta Thrashers (2000–01)	42–27–5–1	W
76	March 27, 2001	1–4	@ Pittsburgh Penguins (2000–01)	42–28–5–1	L
77	March 30, 2001	4–0	Atlanta Thrashers (2000–01)	43–28–5–1	W

April: 3–2–0–0 (home: 1–2–0–0; road: 2–0–0–0)

Game	Date	Score	Opponent	Record	Recap
78	April 1, 2001	4–2	@ Tampa Bay Lightning (2000–01)	44–28–5–1	W
79	April 2, 2001	5–3	@ Florida Panthers (2000–01)	45–28–5–1	W
80	April 4, 2001	2–3	Boston Bruins (2000–01)	45–29–5–1	L
81	April 6, 2001	2–1	Washington Capitals (2000–01)	46–29–5–1	W
82	April 8, 2001	1–2	Philadelphia Flyers (2000–01)	46–30–5–1	L

Legend: W Win (2 points) L Loss (0 points) T Tie (1 point) OTL Overtime loss (1 point)

=== Playoffs ===
2001 Stanley Cup playoffs
Eastern Conference Quarterfinals vs. (4) Philadelphia Flyers – Sabres win 4–2

Game	Date	Score	Opponent	Series	Recap
1	April 11, 2001	2–1	@ Philadelphia Flyers	Sabres lead 1–0	W
2	April 14, 2001	4–3 OT	@ Philadelphia Flyers	Sabres lead 2–0	W
3	April 16, 2001	2–3	Philadelphia Flyers	Sabres lead 2–1	L
4	April 17, 2001	4–3 OT	Philadelphia Flyers	Sabres lead 3–1	W
5	April 19, 2001	1–3	@ Philadelphia Flyers	Sabres lead 3–2	L
6	April 21, 2001	8–0	Philadelphia Flyers	Sabres win 4–2	W

Eastern Conference Semifinals vs. (6) Pittsburgh Penguins – Penguins win 4–3

Game	Date	Score	Opponent	Series	Recap
1	April 26, 2001	0–3	Pittsburgh Penguins	Penguins lead 1–0	L
2	April 28, 2001	1–3	Pittsburgh Penguins	Penguins lead 2–0	L
3	April 30, 2001	4–1	@ Pittsburgh Penguins	Penguins lead 2–1	W
4	May 2, 2001	5–2	@ Pittsburgh Penguins	Series tied 2–2	W
5	May 5, 2001	3–2 OT	Pittsburgh Penguins	Sabres lead 3–2	W
6	May 8, 2001	2–3 OT	@ Pittsburgh Penguins	Series tied 3–3	L
7	May 10, 2001	2–3 OT	Pittsburgh Penguins	Penguins win 4–3	L

Legend: W Win L Loss

== Player statistics ==
=== Scoring ===
- Position abbreviations: C = Center; D = Defense; G = Goaltender; LW = Left wing; RW = Right wing
- † = Joined team via a transaction (e.g., trade, waivers, signing) during the season. Stats reflect time with the Sabres only.
- ‡ = Left team via a transaction (e.g., trade, waivers, release) during the season. Stats reflect time with the Sabres only.

No.	Player	Pos	Regular season						Playoffs					
No.	Player	Pos	GP	G	A	Pts	+/-	PIM	GP	G	A	Pts	+/-	PIM
81 (Note: Satan wore number 18 through November 18.)	Miroslav Satan	LW	82	29	33	62	5	36	13	3	10	13	4	8
17	Jean-Pierre Dumont	RW	79	23	28	51	1	54	13	4	3	7	4	8
41	Stu Barnes	C	75	19	24	43	−2	26	13	4	4	8	0	2
77	Chris Gratton	C	82	19	21	40	0	102	13	6	4	10	0	14
93	Doug Gilmour	C	71	7	31	38	3	70	13	2	4	6	−1	12
44	Alexei Zhitnik	D	78	8	29	37	−3	75	13	1	6	7	−3	12
61	Maxim Afinogenov	RW	78	14	22	36	1	40	11	2	3	5	1	4
52	Dave Andreychuk	LW	74	20	13	33	0	32	13	1	2	3	0	4
37	Curtis Brown	C	70	10	22	32	15	34	13	5	0	5	4	8
9	Erik Rasmussen	LW	82	12	19	31	0	51	3	0	1	1	2	0
25	Vaclav Varada	RW	75	10	21	31	−2	81	13	0	4	4	2	8
5	Jason Woolley	D	67	5	18	23	0	46	8	1	5	6	1	2
45	Dmitri Kalinin	D	79	4	18	22	−2	38	13	0	2	2	5	4
4	Rhett Warrener	D	77	3	16	19	10	78	13	0	2	2	5	4
42	Richard Smehlik	D	56	3	12	15	6	4	10	0	1	1	3	4
29	Vladimir Tsyplakov	LW	36	7	7	14	2	10	9	1	0	1	1	4
3	James Patrick	D	54	4	9	13	9	12	13	1	2	3	0	2
57	Steve Heinze†	RW	14	5	7	12	6	8	13	3	4	7	0	10
55	Denis Hamel	LW	41	8	3	11	−2	22	—	—	—	—	—	—
74	Jay McKee	D	74	1	10	11	9	76	8	1	0	1	3	6
32	Rob Ray	RW	63	4	6	10	2	210	3	0	0	0	0	2
28	Donald Audette†	RW	12	2	6	8	1	12	13	3	6	9	−1	4
26	Eric Boulton	LW	35	1	2	3	−1	94	—	—	—	—	—	—
39	Dominik Hasek	G	67	0	3	3		22	13	0	0	0		14
16	Chris Taylor	C	14	0	2	2	1	6	—	—	—	—	—	—
43	Martin Biron	G	18	0	0	0		0	—	—	—	—	—	—
51	Brian Campbell	D	8	0	0	0	−2	2	—	—	—	—	—	—
35	Mika Noronen	G	2	0	0	0		0	—	—	—	—	—	—
34	Peter Skudra†‡	G	1	0	0	0		0	—	—	—	—	—	—

=== Goaltending ===
- † = Joined team via a transaction (e.g., trade, waivers, signing) during the season. Stats reflect time with the Sabres only.
- ‡ = Left team via a transaction (e.g., trade, waivers, release) during the season. Stats reflect time with the Sabres only.

No.	Player	Regular season										Playoffs								
No.	Player	GP	W	L	T	SA	GA	GAA	SV%	SO	TOI	GP	W	L	SA	GA	GAA	SV%	SO	TOI
39	Dominik Hasek	67	37	24	4	1726	137	2.11	.921	11	3904:11	13	7	6	347	29	2.09	.916	1	833
43	Martin Biron	18	7	7	1	427	39	2.55	.909	2	918:01	—	—	—	—	—	—	—	—	—
35	Mika Noronen	2	2	0	0	39	5	2.78	.872	0	108:22	—	—	—	—	—	—	—	—	—
34	Peter Skudra†‡	1	0	0	0	0	0	0.00		0	0:27	—	—	—	—	—	—	—	—	—

== Awards and records ==
=== Awards ===
Type	Award/honor	Recipient	Ref
League (annual)	NHL First All-Star Team	Dominik Hasek (Goaltender)	
League (annual)	Vezina Trophy	Dominik Hasek	
League (annual)	William M. Jennings Trophy	Dominik Hasek	
League (in-season)	NHL All-Star Game selection	Dominik Hasek	

=== Milestones ===
Milestone	Player	Date	Ref
First game	Eric Boulton	October 5, 2000	
First game	Mika Noronen	October 5, 2000	
500th game played	Dominik Hasek	February 25, 2001	

== Transactions ==
The Sabres were involved in the following transactions from June 11, 2000, the day after the deciding game of the 2000 Stanley Cup Final, through June 9, 2001, the day of the deciding game of the 2001 Stanley Cup Final.

=== Trades ===
Date	Details		Ref
June 23, 2000	To Buffalo Sabres: Past considerations (Note: Columbus agreed to select Dwayne Roloson and Geoff Sanderson in the Expansion Draft.)	To Columbus Blue Jackets: Matt Davidson; Jean-Luc Grand-Pierre; 5th-round pick in 2000; 5th-round pick in 2001	
June 25, 2000	To Buffalo Sabres: 5th-round pick in 2001	To Montreal Canadiens: 6th-round pick in 2000	
June 25, 2000	To Buffalo Sabres: 7th-round pick in 2000	To Tampa Bay Lightning: 7th-round pick in 2001; 9th-round pick in 2001	
June 25, 2000	To Buffalo Sabres: 8th-round pick in 2000	To Calgary Flames: 8th-round pick in 2001	
March 13, 2001	To Buffalo Sabres: Donald Audette	To Atlanta Thrashers: Rights to Kamil Piros; 4th-round pick in 2001	
March 13, 2001	To Buffalo Sabres: Steve Heinze	To Columbus Blue Jackets: 3rd-round pick in 2001	

=== Players acquired ===
Date	Player	Former team	Term	Via	Ref
July 13, 2000	Dave Andreychuk	Colorado Avalanche	1-year	Free agency	
October 6, 2000	Peter Skudra	Boston Bruins		Waivers	

=== Players lost ===
Date	Player	New team	Via (Note: In parentheses is the player's free agency group on July 1 if applicable.)	Ref
June 23, 2000	Dwayne Roloson	Columbus Blue Jackets	Expansion draft	
June 23, 2000	Geoff Sanderson	Columbus Blue Jackets	Expansion draft	
July 1, 2000	Craig Fisher (Note: Fisher suffered a career-ending concussion during the 1999–2000 season.)		Contract expiration (VI)	
July 1, 2000	Mike Zanutto (Note: Zanutto, who did not play during the 1999–2000 season, did not play professionally in 2000–01.)		Contract expiration (UFA)	
July 26, 2000	Domenic Pittis	Edmonton Oilers	Free agency (VI)	
August 9, 2000	Jason Cipolla	Rochester Americans (AHL)	Free agency (UFA)	
August 29, 2000	Mark Dutiaume	B.C. Icemen (UHL)	Free agency (UFA)	
September 8, 2000	Randy Cunneyworth		Retirement (III)	
September 10, 2000	Paul Kruse	San Jose Sharks	Free agency (UFA)	
September 18, 2000	Scott Nichol	Detroit Vipers (IHL)	Free agency (VI)	
September 23, 2000	Daniel Bienvenue	El Paso Buzzards (WPHL)	Free agency (UFA)	
November 3, 2000	Dixon Ward	Boston Bruins	Free agency (III)	
November 14, 2000	Peter Skudra	Boston Bruins	Waivers	
May 12, 2001	Doug Gilmour		Retirement (Note: Gilmour would un-retire five months later to sign with the Montreal Canadiens on October 6, 2001.)	

=== Signings ===
Date	Player	Term	Contract type	Ref
July 12, 2000	Rob Ray	1-year	Re-signing	
July 20, 2000	Alexei Zhitnik	1-year	Re-signing	
July 28, 2000	Chris Taylor	1-year	Re-signing	
August 1, 2000	Jason Woolley	1-year	Re-signing	
August 23, 2000	James Patrick	1-year	Re-signing	
September 7, 2000	Vladimir Tsyplakov	1-year	Re-signing	
September 7, 2000	Jason Woolley	multi-year	Extension	
September 8, 2000	Denis Hamel		Re-signing	
September 8, 2000	Jason Holland		Re-signing	
September 8, 2000	Erik Rasmussen		Re-signing	
November 7, 2000	Martin Biron		Re-signing	

== Draft picks ==
Buffalo's draft picks at the 2000 NHL entry draft held at the Pengrowth Saddledome in Calgary, Alberta.

Round	#	Player	Nationality	College/Junior/Club team (League)
1	15	Artyom Kryukov	Russia	Lokomotiv Yaroslavl (Russia)
2	48	Gerard Dicaire	Canada	Seattle Thunderbirds (WHL)
4	111	Ghyslain Rousseau	Canada	Baie-Comeau Drakkar (QMJHL)
5	149	Denis Denisov	Russia	CSKA Moscow Jr. (Russia)
7	213	Vasili Bizyayev	Russia	CSKA Moscow Jr. (Russia)
7	220	Paul Gaustad	United States	Portland Winterhawks (WHL)
8	258	Sean McMorrow	Canada	Kitchener Rangers (OHL)
9	277	Ryan Courtney	Canada	Windsor Spitfires (OHL)

== Farm teams ==
Rochester Americans finished with a record of 46–22–9–3. They were swept out of the playoffs in the first round.

== See also ==
- 2000–01 NHL season
