= 2000–01 New York Islanders season =

NHL hockey team season

2000–01 New York Islanders
- Division: 5th Atlantic
- Conference: 15th Eastern
- 2000–01 record: 21–51–7–3
- Home record: 12–27–1–1
- Road record: 9–24–6–2
- Goals for: 185
- Goals against: 268

Team information
- General manager: Mike Milbury
- Coach: Butch Goring (Oct.–Mar.); Lorne Henning (Mar.–Apr.)
- Captain: Kenny Jonsson (Oct.–Nov.); Vacant (Nov.–Apr.)
- Arena: Nassau Veterans Memorial Coliseum
- Average attendance: 11,332 (69.5%)
- Minor league affiliates: Chicago Wolves; Springfield Falcons; Trenton Titans

Team leaders
- Goals: Mariusz Czerkawski (30)
- Assists: Mariusz Czerkawski (32)
- Points: Mariusz Czerkawski (62)
- Penalty minutes: Zdeno Chara (157)
- Plus/minus: Kevin Haller (+5)
- Wins: John Vanbiesbrouck (10)
- Goals against average: John Vanbiesbrouck (3.01)

The 2000–01 New York Islanders season was the 29th season in the franchise's history. The team missed the Stanley Cup playoffs for the seventh consecutive season.

== Regular season ==
Defenseman Kenny Jonsson resigned the captaincy on November 18; the role was left vacant for the rest of the season.

Head coach Butch Goring was fired on March 4 and replaced by Lorne Henning on an interim basis through the end of the season.

The Islanders finished the regular season as the most penalized team in the NHL, with 445 power-play opportunities against.

=== Final standings ===
Atlantic Division
No.	CR		GP	W	L	T	OTL	GF	GA	Pts
1	1	**New Jersey Devils**	82	48	19	12	3	295	195	111
2	4	**Philadelphia Flyers**	82	43	25	11	3	240	207	100
3	6	**Pittsburgh Penguins**	82	42	28	9	3	281	256	96
4	10	New York Rangers	82	33	43	5	1	250	290	72
5	15	New York Islanders	82	21	51	7	3	185	268	52

Note: CR = Conference rank; GP = Games played; W = Wins; L = Losses; T = Ties; OTL = Overtime loss; GF = Goals for; GA = Goals against; Pts = Points
Bolded teams qualified for the playoffs.

Eastern Conference
R		Div	GP	W	L	T	OTL	GF	GA	Pts
**1**	**Z-** New Jersey Devils	**AT**	**82**	**48**	**19**	**12**	**3**	**295**	**195**	111
**2**	**Y-** Ottawa Senators	**NE**	**82**	**48**	**21**	**9**	**4**	**274**	**205**	109
**3**	**Y-** Washington Capitals	**SE**	**82**	**41**	**27**	**10**	**4**	**233**	**211**	96
**4**	**X-** Philadelphia Flyers	**AT**	**82**	**43**	**25**	**11**	**3**	**240**	**207**	100
**5**	**X-** Buffalo Sabres	**NE**	**82**	**46**	**30**	**5**	**1**	**218**	**184**	98
**6**	**X-** Pittsburgh Penguins	**AT**	**82**	**42**	**28**	**9**	**3**	**281**	**256**	96
**7**	**X-** Toronto Maple Leafs	**NE**	**82**	**37**	**29**	**11**	**5**	**232**	**207**	90
**8**	**X-** Carolina Hurricanes	**SE**	**82**	**38**	**32**	**9**	**3**	**212**	**225**	88
8.5
9	Boston Bruins	NE	82	36	30	8	8	227	249	88
10	New York Rangers	AT	82	33	43	5	1	250	290	72
11	Montreal Canadiens	NE	82	28	40	8	6	206	232	70
12	Florida Panthers	SE	82	22	38	13	9	200	246	66
13	Atlanta Thrashers	SE	82	23	45	12	2	211	289	60
14	Tampa Bay Lightning	SE	82	24	47	6	5	201	280	59
15	New York Islanders	AT	82	21	51	7	3	185	268	52

Divisions: AT – Atlantic, NE – Northeast, SE – Southeast

Z – Clinched conference; Y – Clinched division; X – Clinched playoff spot

== Schedule and results ==
2000–01 regular season
October: 4–3–2–0 (home: 2–2–0–0; road: 2–1–2–0)

Game	Date	Score	Opponent	Record	Recap
1	October 6, 2000	3–3 OT	@ Tampa Bay Lightning (2000–01)	0–0–1–0	T
2	October 11, 2000	2–3	@ Toronto Maple Leafs (2000–01)	0–1–1–0	L
3	October 14, 2000	0–2	Calgary Flames (2000–01)	0–2–1–0	L
4	October 17, 2000	3–4	Mighty Ducks of Anaheim (2000–01)	0–3–1–0	L
5	October 20, 2000	5–3	@ Atlanta Thrashers (2000–01)	1–3–1–0	W
6	October 21, 2000	4–4 OT	@ Washington Capitals (2000–01)	1–3–2–0	T
7	October 27, 2000	2–1	Montreal Canadiens (2000–01)	2–3–2–0	W
8	October 28, 2000	2–1	@ Montreal Canadiens (2000–01)	3–3–2–0	W
9	October 31, 2000	4–2	Boston Bruins (2000–01)	4–3–2–0	W

November: 3–9–0–2 (home: 2–4–0–1; road: 1–5–0–1)

Game	Date	Score	Opponent	Record	Recap
10	November 1, 2000	3–0	@ Florida Panthers (2000–01)	5–3–2–0	W
11	November 3, 2000	3–4 OT	@ Tampa Bay Lightning (2000–01)	5–3–2–1	OTL
12	November 5, 2000	1–4	Los Angeles Kings (2000–01)	5–4–2–1	L
13	November 7, 2000	2–1	Nashville Predators (2000–01)	6–4–2–1	W
14	November 9, 2000	0–3	@ Buffalo Sabres (2000–01)	6–5–2–1	L
15	November 11, 2000	0–4	San Jose Sharks (2000–01)	6–6–2–1	L
16	November 16, 2000	1–5	@ Los Angeles Kings (2000–01)	6–7–2–1	L
17	November 18, 2000	3–5	@ San Jose Sharks (2000–01)	6–8–2–1	L
18	November 19, 2000	1–2	@ Mighty Ducks of Anaheim (2000–01)	6–9–2–1	L
19	November 22, 2000	3–4 OT	New York Rangers (2000–01)	6–9–2–2	OTL
20	November 24, 2000	0–1	@ Washington Capitals (2000–01)	6–10–2–2	L
21	November 25, 2000	3–4	Detroit Red Wings (2000–01)	6–11–2–2	L
22	November 27, 2000	7–4	Tampa Bay Lightning (2000–01)	7–11–2–2	W
23	November 30, 2000	4–6	Toronto Maple Leafs (2000–01)	7–12–2–2	L

December: 4–8–2–0 (home: 3–6–1–0; road: 1–2–1–0)

Game	Date	Score	Opponent	Record	Recap
24	December 1, 2000	0–0 OT	@ New Jersey Devils (2000–01)	7–12–3–2	T
25	December 3, 2000	1–1 OT	New Jersey Devils (2000–01)	7–12–4–2	T
26	December 6, 2000	4–1	@ Florida Panthers (2000–01)	8–12–4–2	W
27	December 9, 2000	2–5	Atlanta Thrashers (2000–01)	8–13–4–2	L
28	December 10, 2000	2–5	@ Philadelphia Flyers (2000–01)	8–14–4–2	L
29	December 12, 2000	2–3	Washington Capitals (2000–01)	8–15–4–2	L
30	December 15, 2000	3–2	Toronto Maple Leafs (2000–01)	9–15–4–2	W
31	December 16, 2000	0–6	@ Ottawa Senators (2000–01)	9–16–4–2	L
32	December 19, 2000	2–1	Carolina Hurricanes (2000–01)	10–16–4–2	W
33	December 21, 2000	1–3	Dallas Stars (2000–01)	10–17–4–2	L
34	December 23, 2000	5–7	Columbus Blue Jackets (2000–01)	10–18–4–2	L
35	December 27, 2000	2–5	Boston Bruins (2000–01)	10–19–4–2	L
36	December 29, 2000	5–2	Atlanta Thrashers (2000–01)	11–19–4–2	W
37	December 30, 2000	0–2	Buffalo Sabres (2000–01)	11–20–4–2	L

January: 3–10–1–0 (home: 2–5–0–0; road: 1–5–1–0)

Game	Date	Score	Opponent	Record	Recap
38	January 2, 2001	0–3	Montreal Canadiens (2000–01)	11–21–4–2	L
39	January 4, 2001	2–4	@ New Jersey Devils (2000–01)	11–22–4–2	L
40	January 6, 2001	1–2	Phoenix Coyotes (2000–01)	11–23–4–2	L
41	January 7, 2001	2–5	@ Carolina Hurricanes (2000–01)	11–24–4–2	L
42	January 9, 2001	3–6	Chicago Blackhawks (2000–01)	11–25–4–2	L
43	January 12, 2001	3–4	@ Pittsburgh Penguins (2000–01)	11–26–4–2	L
44	January 13, 2001	6–5	Pittsburgh Penguins (2000–01)	12–26–4–2	W
45	January 16, 2001	1–4	@ Colorado Avalanche (2000–01)	12–27–4–2	L
46	January 19, 2001	2–3	@ Minnesota Wild (2000–01)	12–28–4–2	L
47	January 21, 2001	4–4 OT	@ Atlanta Thrashers (2000–01)	12–28–5–2	T
48	January 23, 2001	2–3	Ottawa Senators (2000–01)	12–29–5–2	L
49	January 26, 2001	3–2	@ New York Rangers (2000–01)	13–29–5–2	W
50	January 27, 2001	1–2	Buffalo Sabres (2000–01)	13–30–5–2	L
51	January 31, 2001	3–2	New Jersey Devils (2000–01)	14–30–5–2	W

February: 3–8–0–1 (home: 2–3–0–0; road: 1–5–0–1)

Game	Date	Score	Opponent	Record	Recap
52	February 1, 2001	0–2	@ Philadelphia Flyers (2000–01)	14–31–5–2	L
53	February 7, 2001	1–2 OT	@ Buffalo Sabres (2000–01)	14–31–5–3	OTL
54	February 9, 2001	2–5	Philadelphia Flyers (2000–01)	14–32–5–3	L
55	February 10, 2001	3–5	@ Montreal Canadiens (2000–01)	14–33–5–3	L
56	February 12, 2001	1–3	@ Ottawa Senators (2000–01)	14–34–5–3	L
57	February 14, 2001	1–3	Philadelphia Flyers (2000–01)	14–35–5–3	L
58	February 16, 2001	4–2	@ Edmonton Oilers (2000–01)	15–35–5–3	W
59	February 18, 2001	2–3	@ Vancouver Canucks (2000–01)	15–36–5–3	L
60	February 22, 2001	4–3 OT	Philadelphia Flyers (2000–01)	16–36–5–3	W
61	February 24, 2001	5–4	Florida Panthers (2000–01)	17–36–5–3	W
62	February 25, 2001	1–6	@ Pittsburgh Penguins (2000–01)	17–37–5–3	L
63	February 27, 2001	1–4	New Jersey Devils (2000–01)	17–38–5–3	L

March: 3–10–2–0 (home: 0–6–0–0; road: 3–4–2–0)

Game	Date	Score	Opponent	Record	Recap
64	March 1, 2001	1–3	Carolina Hurricanes (2000–01)	17–39–5–3	L
65	March 3, 2001	0–6	Tampa Bay Lightning (2000–01)	17–40–5–3	L
66	March 5, 2001	5–2	@ New York Rangers (2000–01)	18–40–5–3	W
67	March 6, 2001	1–5	Washington Capitals (2000–01)	18–41–5–3	L
68	March 9, 2001	1–4	Minnesota Wild (2000–01)	18–42–5–3	L
69	March 11, 2001	1–4	Florida Panthers (2000–01)	18–43–5–3	L
70	March 14, 2001	3–1	@ Pittsburgh Penguins (2000–01)	19–43–5–3	W
71	March 17, 2001	3–3 OT	@ Columbus Blue Jackets (2000–01)	19–43–6–3	T
72	March 18, 2001	1–2	@ Carolina Hurricanes (2000–01)	19–44–6–3	L
73	March 20, 2001	4–3 OT	@ St. Louis Blues (2000–01)	20–44–6–3	W
74	March 23, 2001	1–2	@ Dallas Stars (2000–01)	20–45–6–3	L
75	March 25, 2001	2–2 OT	@ Phoenix Coyotes (2000–01)	20–45–7–3	T
76	March 28, 2001	2–4	@ New York Rangers (2000–01)	20–46–7–3	L
77	March 29, 2001	4–6	New York Rangers (2000–01)	20–47–7–3	L
78	March 31, 2001	2–4	@ Boston Bruins (2000–01)	20–48–7–3	L

April: 1–3–0–0 (home: 1–1–0–0; road: 0–2–0–0)

Game	Date	Score	Opponent	Record	Recap
79	April 2, 2001	4–1	Pittsburgh Penguins (2000–01)	21–48–7–3	W
80	April 4, 2001	2–4	@ Toronto Maple Leafs (2000–01)	21–49–7–3	L
81	April 6, 2001	3–4	Ottawa Senators (2000–01)	21–50–7–3	L
82	April 7, 2001	2–4	@ Boston Bruins (2000–01)	21–51–7–3	L

Legend: W Win (2 points) L Loss (0 points) T Tie (1 point) OTL Overtime loss (1 point)

== Player statistics ==
=== Scoring ===
- Position abbreviations: C = Center; D = Defense; G = Goaltender; LW = Left wing; RW = Right wing
- † = Joined team via a transaction (e.g., trade, waivers, signing) during the season. Stats reflect time with the Islanders only.
- ‡ = Left team via a transaction (e.g., trade, waivers, release) during the season. Stats reflect time with the Islanders only.

No.	Player	Pos	Regular season					
No.	Player	Pos	GP	G	A	Pts	+/-	PIM
21	Mariusz Czerkawski	RW	82	30	32	62	−24	48
4	Roman Hamrlik	D	76	16	30	46	−20	92
38	Dave Scatchard	C	81	21	24	45	−9	114
18	Tim Connolly	C	82	10	31	41	−14	42
15	Brad Isbister	LW	51	18	14	32	−19	59
13	Claude Lapointe	LW	80	9	23	32	−2	56
27	Mark Parrish	RW	70	17	13	30	−27	28
29	Kenny Jonsson	D	65	8	21	29	−22	30
11	Bill Muckalt	RW	60	11	15	26	−4	33
12	Oleg Kvasha	C	62	11	9	20	−15	46
28	Garry Galley	D	56	6	14	20	−4	59
17	Taylor Pyatt	LW	78	4	14	18	−17	39
14	Jason Blake†	C	30	4	8	12	−12	24
3	Zdeno Chara	D	82	2	7	9	−27	157
32	Aris Brimanis	D	56	0	8	8	−12	26
25	Juraj Kolnik	RW	29	4	3	7	−8	12
24	Mark Lawrence	RW	36	3	4	7	−9	32
10	Mats Lindgren	C	20	3	4	7	4	10
26	Jeff Toms‡	C	39	2	4	6	−7	10
7	Kevin Haller	D	30	1	5	6	5	56
2	Branislav Mezei	D	42	1	4	5	−5	53
14	Mike Stapleton‡	C	34	1	4	5	−5	2
33	Eric Cairns	D	45	2	2	4	−18	106
37	Steve Martins†	C	39	1	3	4	−7	20
8	Jason Krog	C	9	0	3	3	4	0
16	Craig Berube†	LW	38	0	2	2	−5	54
1	Rick DiPietro	G	20	0	2	2		6
39	Ray Schultz	D	13	0	2	2	−1	40
20 (Note: Webb wore number 8 in his first 15 games.)	Steve Webb	RW	31	0	2	2	1	35
6	Mathieu Biron	D	14	0	1	1	2	12
51	Anders Myrvold	D	12	0	1	1	−2	0
44	Jesse Belanger	C	12	0	0	0	−5	2
30	Wade Flaherty‡	G	20	0	0	0		2
36	Evgeny Korolev	D	8	0	0	0	0	6
49 (Note: After wearing number 49 in his first game, Petrovicky wore number 39 in his next nine games before switching back.)	Robert Petrovicky	C	11	0	0	0	−1	4
30	Chris Terreri†	G	8	0	0	0		2
34	John Vanbiesbrouck‡	G	44	0	0	0		8

=== Goaltending ===
- † = Joined team via a transaction (e.g., trade, waivers, signing) during the season. Stats reflect time with the Islanders only.
- ‡ = Left team via a transaction (e.g., trade, waivers, release) during the season. Stats reflect time with the Islanders only.

No.	Player	Regular season									
No.	Player	GP	W	L	T	SA	GA	GAA	SV%	SO	TOI
34	John Vanbiesbrouck‡	44	10	25	5	1177	120	3.01	.898	1	2390
30	Wade Flaherty‡	20	6	10	0	470	56	3.30	.881	1	1017
1	Rick DiPietro	20	3	15	1	515	63	3.49	.878	0	1083
30	Chris Terreri†	8	2	4	1	205	18	2.44	.912	0	443

== Awards and records ==
=== Awards ===
Type	Award/honor	Recipient	Ref
Team	Bob Nystrom Award	Dave Scatchard	

=== Milestones ===
Milestone	Player	Date	Ref
First game	Taylor Pyatt	October 6, 2000	
First game	Branislav Mezei	November 18, 2000	
First game	Juraj Kolnik	December 29, 2000	
First game	Rick DiPietro	January 27, 2001	

== Transactions ==
The Islanders were involved in the following transactions from June 11, 2000, the day after the deciding game of the 2000 Stanley Cup Final, through June 9, 2001, the day of the deciding game of the 2001 Stanley Cup Final.

=== Trades ===
Date	Details		Ref
June 24, 2000	To New York Islanders: 1st-round pick in 2000; 4th-round pick in 2000; Islanders’ 7th-round pick in 2000	To Tampa Bay Lightning: Kevin Weekes; Rights to Kristian Kudroc; 2nd-round pick in 2001	
June 24, 2000	To New York Islanders: Oleg Kvasha; Mark Parrish	To Florida Panthers: Olli Jokinen; Roberto Luongo	
June 24, 2000	To New York Islanders: Roman Hamrlik	To Edmonton Oilers: Eric Brewer; Josh Green; 2nd-round pick in 2000	
June 25, 2000	To New York Islanders: John Vanbiesbrouck (Note: The Flyers agreed to pay $1.25 million of Vanbiesbrouck's $3.5 million salary for the 2000–01 season.)	To Philadelphia Flyers: 4th-round pick in 2001	
November 15, 2000	To New York Islanders: 9th-round pick in 2001	To Pittsburgh Penguins: Dan Trebil	
December 5, 2000	To New York Islanders: Sean Pronger	To Boston Bruins: Future considerations	
December 28, 2000	To New York Islanders: 9th-round pick in 2001	To Vancouver Canucks: Mike Stapleton	
January 3, 2001	To New York Islanders: Jason Blake	To Los Angeles Kings: Conditional draft pick (Note: 5th-round pick in 2002.)	
January 4, 2001	To New York Islanders: Steve Martins	To Tampa Bay Lightning: Conditional draft pick	
January 11, 2001	To New York Islanders: Craig Berube	To Washington Capitals: Vancouver's 9th-round pick in 2001	
February 16, 2001	To New York Islanders: Conditional draft pick	To Tampa Bay Lightning: Wade Flaherty	
March 12, 2001	To New York Islanders: Chris Terreri; 9th-round pick in 2001	To New Jersey Devils: John Vanbiesbrouck	

=== Players acquired ===
Date	Player	Former team	Term	Via	Ref
July 3, 2000	Kevin Haller	Anaheim Mighty Ducks	3-year	Free agency	
July 3, 2000	Mike Stapleton	Atlanta Thrashers	2-year	Free agency	
July 27, 2000	Jesse Belanger	Montreal Canadiens		Free agency	
July 27, 2000	Robert Petrovicky	Tampa Bay Lightning		Free agency	
July 27, 2000	Jeff Toms	Washington Capitals		Free agency	
July 28, 2000	Dan Trebil	Pittsburgh Penguins		Free agency	
August 28, 2000	Anders Myrvold	AIK IF (SHL)		Free agency	
September 13, 2000	Garry Galley	Los Angeles Kings	1-year (Note: Club option for a second year.)	Free agency	
December 22, 2000	Marco Charpentier	Baie-Comeau Drakkar (QMJHL)		Free agency	
December 22, 2000	David St. Germain	Baie-Comeau Drakkar (QMJHL)		Free agency	

=== Players lost ===
Date	Player	New team	Via (Note: In parentheses is the player's free agency group on July 1 if applicable.)	Ref
June 12, 2000	Vladimir Chebaturkin	St. Louis Blues	Free agency	
June 23, 2000	Ted Drury	Columbus Blue Jackets	Expansion draft	
June 23, 2000	Ian Herbers	Minnesota Wild	Expansion draft	
July 18, 2000	Chris Ferraro	New Jersey Devils	Free agency	
August 7, 2000	Raymond Giroux	HIFK Hockey (Liiga)	Free agency (II) (Note: The Islanders retained Giroux's NHL rights and re-signed him for the 2001–02 season.)	
August 10, 2000	Vladimir Orszagh	Djurgardens IF (SHL)	Free agency	
August 29, 2000	Niklas Andersson	Calgary Flames	Free agency	
September 6, 2000	Johan Davidsson	Vancouver Canucks	Free agency (UFA)	
September 13, 2000	Daniel Lacroix	Newcastle Jesters (BISL)	Free agency	
September 17, 2000	Dmitri Nabokov	HC Lada Togliatti (RSL) (Note: Nabokov played for HC Lada Togliatti in 2000–01.)	Release (II)	
October 27, 2000	Jamie Rivers	Grand Rapids Griffins (AHL)	Free agency (UFA)	
January 13, 2001	Jeff Toms	New York Rangers	Waivers	
April 17, 2001	Jesse Belanger	HC La Chaux-de-Fonds (NLB)	Free agency	
May 18, 2001	Sean Pronger	Columbus Blue Jackets	Waivers	

=== Signings ===
Date	Player	Term	Contract type	Ref
July 25, 2000	Rick DiPietro	3-year	Entry-level	
July 28, 2000	Aris Brimanis		Re-signing	
July 28, 2000	Ray Schultz		Re-signing	
August 3, 2000	Taylor Pyatt		Entry-level	
August 23, 2000	Juraj Kolnik	3-year	Entry-level	
August 25, 2000	Branislav Mezei	3-year	Entry-level	
September 1, 2000	Kenny Jonsson	1-year	Re-signing	
September 7, 2000	Roman Hamrlik	4-year	Re-signing	
September 10, 2000	Zdeno Chara	1-year	Re-signing	
September 10, 2000	Brad Isbister	1-year	Re-signing	
February 6, 2001	Raffi Torres	3-year	Entry-level	

== Draft picks ==
New York's draft picks at the 2000 NHL entry draft held at the Pengrowth Saddledome in Calgary, Alberta.

Round	#	Player	Nationality	College/Junior/Club team (League)
1	1	Rick DiPietro	United States	Boston University (Hockey East)
1	5	Raffi Torres	Canada	Brampton Battalion (OHL)
4	101	Arto Tukio	Finland	Ilves (Finland)
4	105	Vladimir Gorbunov	Russia	HC Moscow (Russia)
5	136	Dmitri Upper	Kazakhstan	Torpedo Nizhny Novgorod (Russia)
5	148	Kristofer Ottosson	Sweden	Djurgårdens IF (Sweden)
7	202	Ryan Caldwell	Canada	Thunder Bay Flyers (TBJHL)
9	264	Dimitri Altaryov	Russia	Dizel Penza (Russia)
9	267	Tomi Pettinen	Finland	Ilves (Finland)

== See also ==
- 2000–01 NHL season
