= 2000–01 Carolina Hurricanes season =

National Hockey League team season

2000–01 Carolina Hurricanes
- Division: 2nd Southeast
- Conference: 8th Eastern
- 2000–01 record: 38–32–9–3
- Home record: 23–15–3–0
- Road record: 15–17–6–3
- Goals for: 212
- Goals against: 225

Team information
- General manager: Jim Rutherford
- Coach: Paul Maurice
- Captain: Ron Francis
- Alternate captains: Rod Brind'Amour; Glen Wesley
- Arena: Raleigh Sports and Entertainment Arena
- Average attendance: 13,355
- Minor league affiliates: Cincinnati Cyclones; Florida Everblades

Team leaders
- Goals: Jeff O'Neill (41)
- Assists: Ron Francis (50)
- Points: Jeff O'Neill (67)
- Penalty minutes: Dave Karpa (159)
- Plus/minus: Kevin Hatcher (+2)
- Wins: Arturs Irbe (37)
- Goals against average: Arturs Irbe (2.45)

The 2000–01 Carolina Hurricanes season was the franchise's 22nd season in the National Hockey League and fourth as the Hurricanes.

== Regular season ==
The Hurricanes allowed the most short-handed goals during the regular season, with 16.

=== Final standings ===
Southeast Division
No.	CR		GP	W	L	T	OTL	GF	GA	Pts
1	3	**Washington Capitals**	82	41	27	10	4	233	211	96
2	8	**Carolina Hurricanes**	82	38	32	9	3	212	225	88
3	12	Florida Panthers	82	22	38	13	9	200	246	66
4	13	Atlanta Thrashers	82	23	45	12	2	211	289	60
5	14	Tampa Bay Lightning	82	24	47	6	5	201	280	59

Note: CR = Conference rank; GP = Games played; W = Wins; L = Losses; T = Ties; OTL = Overtime loss; GF = Goals for; GA = Goals against; Pts = Points
Bolded teams qualified for the playoffs.

Eastern Conference
R		Div	GP	W	L	T	OTL	GF	GA	Pts
**1**	**Z-** New Jersey Devils	**AT**	**82**	**48**	**19**	**12**	**3**	**295**	**195**	111
**2**	**Y-** Ottawa Senators	**NE**	**82**	**48**	**21**	**9**	**4**	**274**	**205**	109
**3**	**Y-** Washington Capitals	**SE**	**82**	**41**	**27**	**10**	**4**	**233**	**211**	96
**4**	**X-** Philadelphia Flyers	**AT**	**82**	**43**	**25**	**11**	**3**	**240**	**207**	100
**5**	**X-** Buffalo Sabres	**NE**	**82**	**46**	**30**	**5**	**1**	**218**	**184**	98
**6**	**X-** Pittsburgh Penguins	**AT**	**82**	**42**	**28**	**9**	**3**	**281**	**256**	96
**7**	**X-** Toronto Maple Leafs	**NE**	**82**	**37**	**29**	**11**	**5**	**232**	**207**	90
**8**	**X-** Carolina Hurricanes	**SE**	**82**	**38**	**32**	**9**	**3**	**212**	**225**	88
8.5
9	Boston Bruins	NE	82	36	30	8	8	227	249	88
10	New York Rangers	AT	82	33	43	5	1	250	290	72
11	Montreal Canadiens	NE	82	28	40	8	6	206	232	70
12	Florida Panthers	SE	82	22	38	13	9	200	246	66
13	Atlanta Thrashers	SE	82	23	45	12	2	211	289	60
14	Tampa Bay Lightning	SE	82	24	47	6	5	201	280	59
15	New York Islanders	AT	82	21	51	7	3	185	268	52

Divisions: AT – Atlantic, NE – Northeast, SE – Southeast

Z – Clinched conference; Y – Clinched division; X – Clinched playoff spot

== Schedule and results ==
=== Regular season ===
2000–01 regular season
October: 3–5–3–0 (home: 2–2–2–0; road: 1–3–1–0)

Game	Date	Score	Opponent	Record	Attendance	Recap
1	October 7, 2000	3–3 OT	Washington Capitals (2000–01)	0–0–1–0	18,337	T
2	October 10, 2000	5–2	Dallas Stars (2000–01)	1–0–1–0	11,673	W
3	October 13, 2000	2–2 OT	@ Florida Panthers (2000–01)	1–0–2–0	13,764	T
4	October 14, 2000	1–2	@ Nashville Predators (2000–01)	1–1–2–0	16,507	L
5	October 18, 2000	3–2	@ Pittsburgh Penguins (2000–01)	2–1–2–0	14,035	W
6	October 21, 2000	2–5	@ Montreal Canadiens (2000–01)	2–2–2–0	19,654	L
7	October 24, 2000	2–3	San Jose Sharks (2000–01)	2–3–2–0	10,140	L
8	October 25, 2000	1–4	@ Buffalo Sabres (2000–01)	2–4–2–0	14,912	L
9	October 27, 2000	3–3 OT	New Jersey Devils (2000–01)	2–4–3–0	18,730	T
10	October 29, 2000	1–4	St. Louis Blues (2000–01)	2–5–3–0	10,155	L
11	October 31, 2000	6–5 OT	Tampa Bay Lightning (2000–01)	3–5–3–0	7,016	W

November: 7–5–0–1 (home: 3–2–0–0; road: 4–3–0–1)

Game	Date	Score	Opponent	Record	Attendance	Recap
12	November 3, 2000	3–5	@ Colorado Avalanche (2000–01)	3–6–3–0	18,007	L
13	November 4, 2000	1–4	@ San Jose Sharks (2000–01)	3–7–3–0	17,496	L
14	November 8, 2000	0–5	@ Toronto Maple Leafs (2000–01)	3–8–3–0	19,098	L
15	November 10, 2000	3–1	Toronto Maple Leafs (2000–01)	4–8–3–0	18,730	W
16	November 12, 2000	4–0	Ottawa Senators (2000–01)	5–8–3–0	12,003	W
17	November 15, 2000	1–4	Florida Panthers (2000–01)	5–9–3–0	11,088	L
18	November 16, 2000	1–0	@ Ottawa Senators (2000–01)	6–9–3–0	15,211	W
19	November 18, 2000	2–3 OT	@ New Jersey Devils (2000–01)	6–9–3–1	16,051	OTL
20	November 22, 2000	3–1	@ Pittsburgh Penguins (2000–01)	7–9–3–1	13,356	W
21	November 24, 2000	3–1	@ Boston Bruins (2000–01)	8–9–3–1	15,921	W
22	November 26, 2000	4–7	Nashville Predators (2000–01)	8–10–3–1	10,827	L
23	November 29, 2000	2–1 OT	@ Florida Panthers (2000–01)	9–10–3–1	13,008	W
24	November 30, 2000	2–0	Philadelphia Flyers (2000–01)	10–10–3–1	13,729	W

December: 4–6–1–1 (home: 3–1–0–0; road: 1–5–1–1)

Game	Date	Score	Opponent	Record	Attendance	Recap
25	December 3, 2000	0–2	Ottawa Senators (2000–01)	10–11–3–1	11,360	L
26	December 6, 2000	5–3	@ Atlanta Thrashers (2000–01)	11–11–3–1	13,095	W
27	December 9, 2000	2–7	@ Calgary Flames (2000–01)	11–12–3–1	16,055	L
28	December 13, 2000	1–1 OT	@ Minnesota Wild (2000–01)	11–12–4–1	18,064	T
29	December 15, 2000	5–3	Buffalo Sabres (2000–01)	12–12–4–1	18,730	W
30	December 16, 2000	1–4	@ Boston Bruins (2000–01)	12–13–4–1	13,306	L
31	December 19, 2000	1–2	@ New York Islanders (2000–01)	12–14–4–1	8,707	L
32	December 23, 2000	1–2 OT	@ Philadelphia Flyers (2000–01)	12–14–4–2	19,645	OTL
33	December 26, 2000	2–3	@ Tampa Bay Lightning (2000–01)	12–15–4–2	12,128	L
34	December 27, 2000	4–3	New York Rangers (2000–01)	13–15–4–2	16,280	W
35	December 29, 2000	1–3	@ Columbus Blue Jackets (2000–01)	13–16–4–2	18,136	L
36	December 31, 2000	2–1	Chicago Blackhawks (2000–01)	14–16–4–2	13,097	W

January: 8–4–2–0 (home: 6–4–1–0; road: 2–0–1–0)

Game	Date	Score	Opponent	Record	Attendance	Recap
37	January 3, 2001	3–2	Tampa Bay Lightning (2000–01)	15–16–4–2	7,517	W
38	January 6, 2001	2–2 OT	Colorado Avalanche (2000–01)	15–16–5–2	18,730	T
39	January 7, 2001	5–2	New York Islanders (2000–01)	16–16–5–2	8,627	W
40	January 9, 2001	7–3	Florida Panthers (2000–01)	17–16–5–2	8,732	W
41	January 12, 2001	2–2 OT	@ Florida Panthers (2000–01)	17–16–6–2	12,727	T
42	January 14, 2001	4–0	Mighty Ducks of Anaheim (2000–01)	18–16–6–2	13,013	W
43	January 16, 2001	3–2 OT	@ Montreal Canadiens (2000–01)	19–16–6–2	19,371	W
44	January 18, 2001	4–2	Boston Bruins (2000–01)	20–16–6–2	10,732	W
45	January 20, 2001	3–6	Los Angeles Kings (2000–01)	20–17–6–2	13,009	L
46	January 22, 2001	2–5	New York Rangers (2000–01)	20–18–6–2	11,193	L
47	January 24, 2001	3–2	@ New York Rangers (2000–01)	21–18–6–2	18,200	W
48	January 27, 2001	3–4	Philadelphia Flyers (2000–01)	21–19–6–2	18,730	L
49	January 29, 2001	5–2	Tampa Bay Lightning (2000–01)	22–19–6–2	8,030	W
50	January 31, 2001	3–4	Toronto Maple Leafs (2000–01)	22–20–6–2	11,581	L

February: 5–4–2–1 (home: 3–2–0–0; road: 2–2–2–1)

Game	Date	Score	Opponent	Record	Attendance	Recap
51	February 1, 2001	3–1	@ Atlanta Thrashers (2000–01)	23–20–6–2	12,399	W
52	February 7, 2001	2–1 OT	@ Phoenix Coyotes (2000–01)	24–20–6–2	12,138	W
53	February 8, 2001	2–4	@ Los Angeles Kings (2000–01)	24–21–6–2	13,884	L
54	February 11, 2001	2–2 OT	@ Mighty Ducks of Anaheim (2000–01)	24–21–7–2	12,630	T
55	February 14, 2001	3–4 OT	@ Detroit Red Wings (2000–01)	24–21–7–3	19,995	OTL
56	February 16, 2001	0–2	Phoenix Coyotes (2000–01)	24–22–7–3	13,812	L
57	February 18, 2001	5–4	Boston Bruins (2000–01)	25–22–7–3	16,206	W
58	February 19, 2001	0–4	@ Philadelphia Flyers (2000–01)	25–23–7–3	19,566	L
59	February 21, 2001	6–3	Atlanta Thrashers (2000–01)	26–23–7–3	9,458	W
60	February 23, 2001	3–2	New Jersey Devils (2000–01)	27–23–7–3	14,685	W
61	February 24, 2001	1–2	Washington Capitals (2000–01)	27–24–7–3	18,730	L
62	February 27, 2001	1–1 OT	@ Atlanta Thrashers (2000–01)	27–24–8–3	14,081	T

March: 8–7–0–0 (home: 5–3–0–0; road: 3–4–0–0)

Game	Date	Score	Opponent	Record	Attendance	Recap
63	March 1, 2001	3–1	@ New York Islanders (2000–01)	28–24–8–3	9,069	W
64	March 2, 2001	3–7	@ New Jersey Devils (2000–01)	28–25–8–3	15,159	L
65	March 4, 2001	6–3	@ Chicago Blackhawks (2000–01)	29–25–8–3	14,773	W
66	March 7, 2001	2–1	Columbus Blue Jackets (2000–01)	30–25–8–3	9,067	W
67	March 8, 2001	0–1	@ Tampa Bay Lightning (2000–01)	30–26–8–3	10,656	L
68	March 11, 2001	2–3	Edmonton Oilers (2000–01)	30–27–8–3	13,124	L
69	March 14, 2001	3–6	Montreal Canadiens (2000–01)	30–28–8–3	9,467	L
70	March 15, 2001	3–0	@ Washington Capitals (2000–01)	31–28–8–3	18,672	W
71	March 18, 2001	2–1	New York Islanders (2000–01)	32–28–8–3	14,112	W
72	March 21, 2001	1–0	Buffalo Sabres (2000–01)	33–28–8–3	12,899	W
73	March 23, 2001	5–3	Pittsburgh Penguins (2000–01)	34–28–8–3	18,730	W
74	March 24, 2001	1–3	@ Buffalo Sabres (2000–01)	34–29–8–3	18,690	L
75	March 26, 2001	2–4	Montreal Canadiens (2000–01)	34–30–8–3	12,376	L
76	March 28, 2001	0–7	@ Washington Capitals (2000–01)	34–31–8–3	15,518	L
77	March 30, 2001	4–3 OT	Washington Capitals (2000–01)	35–31–8–3	17,355	W

April: 3–1–1–0 (home: 1–1–0–0; road: 2–0–1–0)

Game	Date	Score	Opponent	Record	Attendance	Recap
78	April 1, 2001	3–2 OT	@ Ottawa Senators (2000–01)	36–31–8–3	18,500	W
79	April 3, 2001	2–2 OT	@ St. Louis Blues (2000–01)	36–31–9–3	18,216	T
80	April 4, 2001	3–1	@ New York Rangers (2000–01)	37–31–9–3	18,200	W
81	April 6, 2001	3–2	Atlanta Thrashers (2000–01)	38–31–9–3	17,044	W
82	April 8, 2001	4–6	Pittsburgh Penguins (2000–01)	38–32–9–3	18,730	L

Legend: W Win (2 points) L Loss (0 points) T Tie (1 point) OTL Overtime loss (1 point)

=== Playoffs ===
2001 Stanley Cup playoffs
Eastern Conference Quarterfinals vs. (1) New Jersey Devils – Devils win 4–2

Game	Date	Score	Opponent	Series	Recap
1	April 12, 2001	1–5	@ New Jersey Devils	Devils lead 1–0	L
2	April 15, 2001	0–2	@ New Jersey Devils	Devils lead 2–0	L
3	April 17, 2001	0–4	New Jersey Devils	Devils lead 3–0	L
4	April 18, 2001	3–2 OT	New Jersey Devils	Devils lead 3–1	W
5	April 20, 2001	3–2	@ New Jersey Devils	Devils lead 3–2	W
6	April 22, 2001	1–5	New Jersey Devils	Devils win 4–2	L

Legend: W Win L Loss

== Player statistics ==
=== Scoring ===
- Position abbreviations: C = Center; D = Defense; G = Goaltender; LW = Left wing; RW = Right wing
- † = Joined team via a transaction (e.g., trade, waivers, signing) during the season. Stats reflect time with the Hurricanes only.

No.	Player	Pos	Regular season						Playoffs					
No.	Player	Pos	GP	G	A	Pts	+/-	PIM	GP	G	A	Pts	+/-	PIM
92	Jeff O'Neill	RW	82	41	26	67	−18	106	6	1	2	3	−3	10
10	Ron Francis	C	82	15	50	65	−15	32	3	0	0	0	−2	0
24	Sami Kapanen	LW	82	20	37	57	−12	24	6	2	3	5	−7	0
17	Rod Brind'Amour	C	79	20	36	56	−7	47	6	1	3	4	−7	6
23	Martin Gelinas	LW	79	23	29	52	−4	59	6	0	1	1	−4	6
25	Shane Willis	RW	73	20	24	44	−6	45	2	0	0	0	−1	0
8	Sandis Ozolinsh	D	72	12	32	44	−25	71	6	0	2	2	−2	5
45	David Tanabe	D	74	7	22	29	−9	42	6	2	0	2	−4	12
13	Bates Battaglia	LW	80	12	15	27	−14	76	6	0	2	2	−3	2
19	Rob DiMaio	RW	74	6	18	24	−14	54	6	0	0	0	−5	4
63	Josef Vasicek	C	76	8	13	21	−8	53	6	2	0	2	−1	0
2	Glen Wesley	D	71	5	16	21	−2	42	6	0	0	0	−6	0
5	Marek Malik	D	61	6	14	20	−4	34	3	0	0	0	−3	6
4	Kevin Hatcher	D	57	4	14	18	2	38	6	0	0	0	−6	6
33	Dave Karpa	D	80	4	6	10	−19	159	6	0	0	0	−3	17
16	Tommy Westlund	C	79	5	3	8	−9	23	6	0	0	0	−2	17
7	Niclas Wallin	D	37	2	3	5	−11	21	3	0	0	0	−2	2
38	Scott Pellerin†	RW	19	0	5	5	−4	6	6	0	0	0	−3	4
11	Jeff Daniels	RW	67	1	1	2	−3	15	6	0	2	2	−1	2
1	Arturs Irbe	G	77	0	2	2		6	6	0	0	0		4
20	Darren Langdon	LW	54	0	2	2	−4	94	4	0	0	0	0	12
27	Craig Adams	RW	44	1	0	1	−7	20	3	0	0	0	0	0
14	Steven Halko	D	48	0	1	1	−10	6	—	—	—	—	—	—
36	Greg Koehler	C	1	0	0	0	0	0	—	—	—	—	—	—
53	Greg Kuznik	D	1	0	0	0	0	0	—	—	—	—	—	—
31	Tyler Moss	G	12	0	0	0		0	—	—	—	—	—	—
18	Mike Rucinski	D	2	0	0	0	0	0	—	—	—	—	—	—

=== Goaltending ===
No.	Player	Regular season										Playoffs								
No.	Player	GP	W	L	T	SA	GA	GAA	SV%	SO	TOI	GP	W	L	SA	GA	GAA	SV%	SO	TOI
1	Arturs Irbe	77	37	29	9	1947	180	2.45	.908	6	4406	6	2	4	201	20	3.34	.900	0	360
31	Tyler Moss	12	1	6	0	251	37	3.99	.853	0	557	—	—	—	—	—	—	—	—	—

== Awards and records ==
=== Awards ===
Type	Award/honor	Recipient	Ref
League (annual)	NHL All-Rookie Team	Shane Willis (Forward)	
League (in-season)	NHL All-Star Game selection	Sandis Ozolinsh (Note: Ozolinsh was voted to the starting lineup.)	
League (in-season)	NHL Rookie of the Month	Shane Willis (February)	
Team	Good Guy Award	Glen Wesley	
Team	Most Valuable Player	Arturs Irbe	
Team	Steve Chiasson Award	Rod Brind'Amour	

=== Milestones ===
Milestone	Player	Date	Ref
First game	Josef Vasicek	October 7, 2000	
First game	Niclas Wallin	October 7, 2000	
First game	Greg Kuznik	October 21, 2000	
First game	Craig Adams	October 24, 2000	
First game	Greg Koehler	December 29, 2000	
25th shutout	Arturs Irbe	November 12, 2000	
1,000th game played	Glen Wesley	January 20, 2001	

== Transactions ==
The Hurricanes were involved in the following transactions from June 11, 2000, the day after the deciding game of the 2000 Stanley Cup Final, through June 9, 2001, the day of the deciding game of the 2001 Stanley Cup Final.

=== Trades ===
Date	Details		Ref
June 24, 2000	To Carolina Hurricanes: Sandis Ozolinsh; Columbus’ 2nd-round pick in 2000	To Colorado Avalanche: Nolan Pratt; 1st-round pick in 2000; 2nd-round pick in 2000; Philadelphia’s 2nd-round pick in 2000	
June 25, 2000	To Carolina Hurricanes: 4th-round pick in 2000	To Atlanta Thrashers: Anaheim’s 4th-round pick in 2000; 5th-round pick in 2000; 8th-round pick in 2000	
August 4, 2000	To Carolina Hurricanes: Rob DiMaio; Darren Langdon	To New York Rangers: Sandy McCarthy; 4th-round pick in 2001	
March 1, 2001	To Carolina Hurricanes: Scott Pellerin	To Minnesota Wild: Askhat Rakhmatullin; 3rd-round pick in 2001; Future considerations	

=== Players acquired ===
Date	Player	Former team	Term	Via	Ref
July 31, 2000	Kevin Hatcher	New York Rangers	1-year (Note: Player option for a second year and club option for two additional years.)	Free agency	
August 1, 2000	Brian Felsner	Cincinnati Cyclones (IHL)		Free agency	
August 1, 2000	Jon Rohloff	Kansas City Blades (IHL)		Free agency	
August 9, 2000	Tyler Moss	Pittsburgh Penguins		Free agency	
August 21, 2000	Bujar Amidovski	Philadelphia Flyers		Free agency	
August 21, 2000	Reggie Berg	Florida Everblades (ECHL)		Free agency	
August 21, 2000	Jeremiah McCarthy	Springfield Falcons (AHL)		Free agency	
August 21, 2000	Harlan Pratt	Florida Everblades (ECHL)		Free agency	

=== Players lost ===
Date	Player	New team	Via (Note: In parentheses is the player's free agency group on July 1 if applicable.)	Ref
N/A	Eric Dandenault	Berlin Capitals (DEL)	Free agency (VI)	
N/A	Todd Simon	Essen Mosquitoes (DEL)	Free agency (VI)	
June 23, 2000	Robert Kron	Columbus Blue Jackets	Expansion draft	
June 23, 2000	Curtis Leschyshyn	Minnesota Wild	Expansion draft	
July 1, 2000	Sergei Fedotov (Note: Fedotov retired.)		Contract expiration (UFA)	
July 1, 2000	Sean Hill	St. Louis Blues	Free agency (V)	
July 1, 2000	Mike Morrone (Note: Morrone retired.)		Contract expiration (UFA)	
July 4, 2000	Gary Roberts	Toronto Maple Leafs	Free agency (III)	
July 13, 2000	Paul Coffey	Boston Bruins	Free agency (III)	
July 25, 2000	Andrei Kovalenko	Boston Bruins	Free agency (UFA)	
August 10, 2000	Steve Bancroft	San Jose Sharks	Free agency (VI)	
August 18, 2000	Hugh Hamilton	Florida Everblades (ECHL)	Free agency (UFA)	
August 23, 2000	Gilbert Dionne	Cincinnati Cyclones (IHL)	Free agency (UFA)	
August 28, 2000	Len Esau	Cincinnati Cyclones (IHL)	Free agency (UFA)	
February 11, 2001	Mark Fitzpatrick	Detroit Vipers (IHL)	Free agency (III)	

=== Signings ===
Date	Player	Term	Contract type	Ref
July 6, 2000	Dave Karpa		Re-signing	
July 6, 2000	Niclas Wallin		Entry-level	
July 10, 2000	Ian MacNeil	multi-year	Re-signing	
July 24, 2000	Sandis Ozolinsh	5-year	Re-signing	
August 1, 2000	Bates Battaglia		Re-signing	
August 1, 2000	Steven Halko		Re-signing	
August 1, 2000	Greg Koehler		Re-signing	
August 1, 2000	Sandy McCarthy		Re-signing	
August 1, 2000	Byron Ritchie		Re-signing	
August 1, 2000	Shane Willis		Re-signing	
August 4, 2000	Martin Gelinas	2-year	Extension	
August 6, 2000	Jeff O'Neill		Re-signing	
August 21, 2000	Jeff Daniels	1-year	Re-signing	
August 21, 2000	Mike Rucinski	2-year	Re-signing	
November 24, 2000	Damian Surma	multi-year	Entry-level	

== Draft picks ==
Carolina's picks at the 2000 NHL entry draft in Calgary, Alberta, Canada.

Round	#	Player	Position	Nationality	College/Junior/Club team
2	32	Tomas Kurka	Left wing	Czech Republic	Plymouth Whalers (OHL)
3	80	Ryan Bayda	Left wing	Canada	University of North Dakota (WCHA)
4	98	Niclas Wallin	Defense	Sweden	Brynas IF (Sweden)
4	110	Jared Newman	Defense	United States	Plymouth Whalers (OHL)
6	181	Justin Forrest	Defense	United States	US National U-18, Exhibition
7	212	Magnus Kahnberg	Right wing	Sweden	Frolunda HC (Sweden)
8	235	Craig Kowalski	Goaltender	United States	Northern Michigan University (CCHA)
9	276	Troy Ferguson	Center	Canada	Michigan State Spartans (CCHA)

== Farm teams ==
=== International Hockey League ===
The Cincinnati Cyclones were the Hurricanes International Hockey League affiliate for the 2000–01 IHL season.

=== East Coast Hockey League ===
The Florida Everblades were the Hurricanes East Coast Hockey League affiliate.
