= 2000–01 New York Rangers season =

NHL hockey team season

2000–01 New York Rangers
- Division: 4th Atlantic
- Conference: 10th Eastern
- 2000–01 record: 33–43–5–1
- Home record: 17–20–3–1
- Road record: 16–23–2–0
- Goals for: 250
- Goals against: 290

Team information
- General manager: Glen Sather
- Coach: Ron Low
- Captain: Mark Messier
- Arena: Madison Square Garden
- Average attendance: 18,200 (100%)
- Minor league affiliates: Hartford Wolf Pack; Charlotte Checkers

Team leaders
- Goals: Petr Nedved (32)
- Assists: Brian Leetch (58)
- Points: Brian Leetch (79)
- Penalty minutes: Dale Purinton (180)
- Plus/minus: Petr Nedved (+10)
- Wins: Mike Richter (20)
- Goals against average: Mike Richter (3.28)

The 2000–01 New York Rangers season was the franchise's 75th season. The Rangers compiled a 33–43–5–1 record in the regular season, finishing in fourth place in the Atlantic Division. New York's 10th-place finish in the Eastern Conference left it out of the 2001 Stanley Cup playoffs; it was the first time the team missed the postseason for four consecutive seasons since the 1962–63 to 1965–66 seasons.

The season saw several new faces join the team. Glen Sather, the longtime Edmonton Oilers executive, was brought in to be team president and general manager. Ron Low was hired as the team's head coach. Former team captain Mark Messier returned to the Rangers after spending the previous three seasons with the Vancouver Canucks and resumed his place as team captain.

== Regular season ==
The Rangers allowed the most goals during the regular season, with 290. They also scored the most short-handed goals, with 16.

=== Final standings ===
Atlantic Division
No.	CR		GP	W	L	T	OTL	GF	GA	Pts
1	1	**New Jersey Devils**	82	48	19	12	3	295	195	111
2	4	**Philadelphia Flyers**	82	43	25	11	3	240	207	100
3	6	**Pittsburgh Penguins**	82	42	28	9	3	281	256	96
4	10	New York Rangers	82	33	43	5	1	250	290	72
5	15	New York Islanders	82	21	51	7	3	185	268	52

Note: CR = Conference rank; GP = Games played; W = Wins; L = Losses; T = Ties; OTL = Overtime loss; GF = Goals for; GA = Goals against; Pts = Points
Bolded teams qualified for the playoffs.

Eastern Conference
R		Div	GP	W	L	T	OTL	GF	GA	Pts
**1**	**Z-** New Jersey Devils	**AT**	**82**	**48**	**19**	**12**	**3**	**295**	**195**	111
**2**	**Y-** Ottawa Senators	**NE**	**82**	**48**	**21**	**9**	**4**	**274**	**205**	109
**3**	**Y-** Washington Capitals	**SE**	**82**	**41**	**27**	**10**	**4**	**233**	**211**	96
**4**	**X-** Philadelphia Flyers	**AT**	**82**	**43**	**25**	**11**	**3**	**240**	**207**	100
**5**	**X-** Buffalo Sabres	**NE**	**82**	**46**	**30**	**5**	**1**	**218**	**184**	98
**6**	**X-** Pittsburgh Penguins	**AT**	**82**	**42**	**28**	**9**	**3**	**281**	**256**	96
**7**	**X-** Toronto Maple Leafs	**NE**	**82**	**37**	**29**	**11**	**5**	**232**	**207**	90
**8**	**X-** Carolina Hurricanes	**SE**	**82**	**38**	**32**	**9**	**3**	**212**	**225**	88
8.5
9	Boston Bruins	NE	82	36	30	8	8	227	249	88
10	New York Rangers	AT	82	33	43	5	1	250	290	72
11	Montreal Canadiens	NE	82	28	40	8	6	206	232	70
12	Florida Panthers	SE	82	22	38	13	9	200	246	66
13	Atlanta Thrashers	SE	82	23	45	12	2	211	289	60
14	Tampa Bay Lightning	SE	82	24	47	6	5	201	280	59
15	New York Islanders	AT	82	21	51	7	3	185	268	52

Divisions: AT – Atlantic, NE – Northeast, SE – Southeast

Z – Clinched conference; Y – Clinched division; X – Clinched playoff spot

== Schedule and results ==
2000–01 regular season
October: 4–6–0–0 (home: 2–4–0–0; road: 2–2–0–0)

Game	Date	Opponent	Score	Record	Recap
1	October 7, 2000	@ Atlanta Thrashers	2–1	1–0–0–0	W
2	October 11, 2000	Montreal Canadiens	3–1	2–0–0–0	W
3	October 14, 2000	@ Pittsburgh Penguins	8–6	2–1–0–0	L
4	October 16, 2000	Mighty Ducks of Anaheim	4–3	2–2–0–0	L
5	October 18, 2000	@ Chicago Blackhawks	4–2	3–2–0–0	W
6	October 22, 2000	Tampa Bay Lightning	4–2	3–3–0–0	L
7	October 24, 2000	Philadelphia Flyers	5–4	3–4–0–0	L
8	October 26, 2000	@ Philadelphia Flyers	3–0	3–5–0–0	L
9	October 27, 2000	Pittsburgh Penguins	4–1	3–6–0–0	L
10	October 29, 2000	Boston Bruins	5–1	4–6–0–0	W

November: 9–6–0–0 (home: 4–2–0–0; road: 5–4–0–0)

Game	Date	Opponent	Score	Record	Recap
11	November 1, 2000	Tampa Bay Lightning	6–1	5–6–0–0	W
12	November 2, 2000	@ Ottawa Senators	6–5	5–7–0–0	L
13	November 4, 2000	@ Montreal Canadiens	5–2	6–7–0–0	W
14	November 7, 2000	Edmonton Oilers	4–3	7–7–0–0	W
15	November 9, 2000	@ Washington Capitals	5–3	8–7–0–0	W
16	November 12, 2000	Phoenix Coyotes	2–0	8–8–0–0	L
17	November 15, 2000	@ Minnesota Wild	3–2	9–8–0–0	W
18	November 17, 2000	@ Vancouver Canucks	4–3	9–9–0–0	L
19	November 18, 2000	@ Calgary Flames	5–4 OT	10–9–0–0	W
20	November 21, 2000	Toronto Maple Leafs	3–1	10–10–0–0	L
21	November 22, 2000	@ New York Islanders	4–3 OT	11–10–0–0	W
22	November 24, 2000	@ Buffalo Sabres	3–2	11–11–0–0	L
23	November 26, 2000	Ottawa Senators	3–2	12–11–0–0	W
24	November 28, 2000	Los Angeles Kings	7–6	13–11–0–0	W
25	November 29, 2000	@ New Jersey Devils	5–2	13–12–0–0	L

December: 3–9–1–1 (home: 3–3–0–1; road: 0–6–1–0)

Game	Date	Opponent	Score	Record	Recap
26	December 2, 2000	@ Toronto Maple Leafs	8–2	13–13–0–0	L
27	December 3, 2000	Colorado Avalanche	6–3	13–14–0–0	L
28	December 6, 2000	Washington Capitals	3–2	14–14–0–0	W
29	December 8, 2000	Buffalo Sabres	5–2	15–14–0–0	W
30	December 9, 2000	@ Boston Bruins	6–4	15–15–0–0	L
31	December 12, 2000	@ San Jose Sharks	3–2	15–16–0–0	L
32	December 14, 2000	@ Los Angeles Kings	5–5 OT	15–16–1–0	T
33	December 15, 2000	@ Mighty Ducks of Anaheim	6–4	15–17–1–0	L
34	December 18, 2000	Florida Panthers	6–3	16–17–1–0	W
35	December 20, 2000	St. Louis Blues	6–3	16–18–1–0	L
36	December 23, 2000	Nashville Predators	3–2 OT	16–18–1–1	OTL
37	December 27, 2000	@ Carolina Hurricanes	4–3	16–19–1–1	L
38	December 28, 2000	Atlanta Thrashers	4–1	16–20–1–1	L
39	December 31, 2000	@ Dallas Stars	6–1	16–21–1–1	L

January: 5–7–2–0 (home: 4–4–1–0; road: 1–3–1–0)

Game	Date	Opponent	Score	Record	Recap
40	January 4, 2001	@ Phoenix Coyotes	3–1	16–22–1–1	L
41	January 6, 2001	New Jersey Devils	5–5 OT	16–22–2–1	T
42	January 8, 2001	Dallas Stars	2–1	16–23–2–1	L
43	January 13, 2001	@ Boston Bruins	4–1	16–24–2–1	L
44	January 14, 2001	Minnesota Wild	4–2	17–24–2–1	W
45	January 16, 2001	Philadelphia Flyers	4–3 OT	18–24–2–1	W
46	January 18, 2001	Toronto Maple Leafs	2–1 OT	19–24–2–1	W
47	January 20, 2001	@ Montreal Canadiens	2–2 OT	19–24–3–1	T
48	January 22, 2001	@ Carolina Hurricanes	5–2	20–24–3–1	W
49	January 24, 2001	Carolina Hurricanes	3–2	20–25–3–1	L
50	January 26, 2001	New York Islanders	3–2	20–26–3–1	L
51	January 27, 2001	@ Toronto Maple Leafs	3–1	20–27–3–1	L
52	January 29, 2001	Atlanta Thrashers	7–2	20–28–3–1	L
53	January 31, 2001	Montreal Canadiens	4–2	21–28–3–1	W

February: 5–4–1–0 (home: 2–2–1–0; road: 3–2–0–0)

Game	Date	Opponent	Score	Record	Recap
54	February 6, 2001	Buffalo Sabres	6–3	21–29–3–1	L
55	February 9, 2001	@ Florida Panthers	4–2	22–29–3–1	W
56	February 11, 2001	New Jersey Devils	1–1 OT	22–29–4–1	T
57	February 12, 2001	@ Columbus Blue Jackets	4–3	23–29–4–1	W
58	February 17, 2001	@ Tampa Bay Lightning	5–4	24–29–4–1	W
59	February 19, 2001	Chicago Blackhawks	4–2	25–29–4–1	W
60	February 23, 2001	@ Pittsburgh Penguins	6–4	25–30–4–1	L
61	February 25, 2001	@ Philadelphia Flyers	2–1	25–31–4–1	L
62	February 26, 2001	Ottawa Senators	3–2	25–32–4–1	L
63	February 28, 2001	Florida Panthers	4–2	26–32–4–1	W

March: 5–9–1–0 (home: 2–4–1–0; road: 3–5–0–0)

Game	Date	Opponent	Score	Record	Recap
64	March 2, 2001	Pittsburgh Penguins	7–5	26–33–4–1	L
65	March 4, 2001	@ Nashville Predators	5–2	26–34–4–1	L
66	March 5, 2001	New York Islanders	5–2	26–35–4–1	L
67	March 9, 2001	@ Washington Capitals	5–3	26–36–4–1	L
68	March 10, 2001	@ Ottawa Senators	3–2	27–36–4–1	W
69	March 12, 2001	Pittsburgh Penguins	3–3 OT	27–36–5–1	T
70	March 14, 2001	@ Buffalo Sabres	6–3	27–37–5–1	L
71	March 17, 2001	@ Philadelphia Flyers	2–1	27–38–5–1	L
72	March 19, 2001	Washington Capitals	6–3	28–38–5–1	W
73	March 21, 2001	@ New Jersey Devils	4–0	28–39–5–1	L
74	March 24, 2001	Detroit Red Wings	6–0	28–40–5–1	L
75	March 25, 2001	Boston Bruins	3–2	28–41–5–1	L
76	March 28, 2001	New York Islanders	4–2	29–41–5–1	W
77	March 29, 2001	@ New York Islanders	6–4	30–41–5–1	W
78	March 31, 2001	@ New Jersey Devils	4–3	31–41–5–1	W

April: 2–2–0–0 (home: 0–1–0–0; road: 2–1–0–0)

Game	Date	Opponent	Score	Record	Recap
79	April 1, 2001	@ Atlanta Thrashers	4–2	32–41–5–1	W
80	April 4, 2001	Carolina Hurricanes	3–1	32–42–5–1	L
81	April 5, 2001	@ Tampa Bay Lightning	4–3 OT	33–42–5–1	W
82	April 7, 2001	@ Florida Panthers	3–0	33–43–5–1	L

Legend: W Win (2 points) L Loss (0 points) T Tie (1 point) OTL Overtime loss (1 point)

== Player statistics ==
=== Scoring ===
- Position abbreviations: C = Center; D = Defense; G = Goaltender; LW = Left wing; RW = Right wing
- † = Joined team via a transaction (e.g., trade, waivers, signing) during the season. Stats reflect time with the Rangers only.
- ‡ = Left team via a transaction (e.g., trade, waivers, release) during the season. Stats reflect time with the Rangers only.

No.	Player	Pos	Regular season					
No.	Player	Pos	GP	G	A	Pts	+/-	PIM
2	Brian Leetch	D	82	21	58	79	−18	34
93	Petr Nedved	C	79	32	46	78	10	54
14	Theoren Fleury	RW	62	30	44	74	0	122
20	Radek Dvorak	RW	82	31	36	67	9	20
11	Mark Messier	C	82	24	43	67	−25	89
27	Jan Hlavac	LW	79	28	36	64	3	20
13	Valeri Kamensky	LW	65	14	20	34	−18	36
18	Mike York	C	79	14	17	31	1	20
9	Adam Graves	LW	82	10	16	26	−16	77
3	Kim Johnsson	D	75	5	21	26	−3	40
10	Sandy McCarthy	RW	81	11	10	21	3	171
8 (Note: Grosek wore number 22 in the season opener.)	Michal Grosek	RW	65	9	11	20	−10	61
24	Sylvain Lefebvre	D	71	2	13	15	3	55
6	Manny Malhotra	C	50	4	8	12	−10	31
47	Rich Pilon	D	69	2	9	11	−2	175
26	Tim Taylor	C	38	2	5	7	−6	16
28	Eric Lacroix‡	LW	46	2	3	5	−6	39
17	Colin Forbes†	LW	19	1	4	5	−3	15
22	Tomas Kloucek	D	43	1	4	5	−3	74
4	Brad Brown	D	48	1	3	4	0	107
25	Alexei Gusarov†‡	D	26	1	3	4	−2	6
38	Jeff Ulmer	RW	21	3	0	3	−6	8
33	Mike Mottau	D	18	0	3	3	−6	13
25	Peter Smrek†	D	14	0	3	3	1	12
29	Johan Witehall‡	LW	15	0	3	3	−5	8
29	Jeff Toms†	LW	15	1	1	2	−3	0
23	Vladimir Malakhov	D	3	0	2	2	0	4
5	Dale Purinton	D	42	0	2	2	5	180
39	Brad Smyth	RW	4	1	0	1	0	4
21 (Note: Armstrong wore number 17 in his first game.)	Derek Armstrong	C	3	0	0	0	0	0
39	Drew Bannister	D	3	0	0	0	−1	0
21 (Note: Doig wore number 25 in his first two games.)	Jason Doig	D	3	0	0	0	0	0
31	Guy Hebert†	G	13	0	0	0		0
32	Johan Holmqvist	G	2	0	0	0		2
34	Jason LaBarbera	G	1	0	0	0		0
15	John MacLean‡	RW	2	0	0	0	−2	0
30	Kirk McLean	G	23	0	0	0		0
35	Mike Richter	G	45	0	0	0		0
21	Bert Robertsson†‡	D	2	0	0	0	−1	4
37	Tony Tuzzolino	RW	6	0	0	0	−1	5
36	David Wilkie	D	1	0	0	0	−2	2
31	Vitali Yeremeyev	G	4	0	0	0		0

=== Goaltending ===
- † = Joined team via a transaction (e.g., trade, waivers, signing) during the season. Stats reflect time with the Rangers only.

No.	Player	Regular season									
No.	Player	GP	W	L	T	SA	GA	GAA	SV%	SO	TOI
35	Mike Richter	45	20	21	3	1487	144	3.28	.893	0	2635
30	Kirk McLean	23	8	10	1	710	71	3.49	.889	0	1220
31	Guy Hebert†	13	5	7	1	409	42	3.43	.897	0	735
31	Vitali Yeremeyev	4	0	4	0	120	16	4.52	.846	0	212
32	Johan Holmqvist	2	0	2	0	81	10	5.05	.859	0	119
34	Jason LaBarbera	1	0	0	0	2	0	0.00	1.000	0	10

== Awards and records ==
=== Awards ===
Type	Award/honor	Recipient	Ref
League (annual)	Bill Masterton Memorial Trophy	Adam Graves	
League (in-season)	NHL All-Star Game selection	Theoren Fleury (Note: Fleury was voted to the starting lineup.)	
League (in-season)	NHL All-Star Game selection	Brian Leetch	
League (in-season)	NHL Player of the Week	Theoren Fleury (November 6)	
Team	Ceil Saidel Memorial Award	Adam Graves	
Team	Frank Boucher Trophy	Brian Leetch	
Team	Good Guy Award	Petr Nedved	
Team	Lars-Erik Sjoberg Award	Filip Novak	
Team	Players' Player Award	Brian Leetch	
Team	Rangers MVP	Brian Leetch	
Team	Rookie of the Year	Tomas Kloucek	
Team	Steven McDonald Extra Effort Award	Sandy McCarthy	

=== Milestones ===
Milestone	Player	Date	Ref
First game	Jason LaBarbera	October 14, 2000	
First game	Mike Mottau	October 26, 2000	
First game	Johan Holmqvist	October 27, 2000	
First game	Tomas Kloucek	November 12, 2000	
First game	Vitali Yeremeyev	December 27, 2000	
First game	Jeff Ulmer	January 31, 2001	
600th assist	Brian Leetch	October 14, 2000	
400th goal scored	Theoren Fleury	November 4, 2000	

== Transactions ==
The Rangers were involved in the following transactions from June 11, 2000, the day after the deciding game of the 2000 Stanley Cup Final, through June 9, 2001, the day of the deciding game of the 2001 Stanley Cup Final.

=== Trades ===
Date	Details		Ref
June 24, 2000	To New York Rangers: 2nd-round pick in 2000; 3rd-round pick in 2000	To Detroit Red Wings: 2nd-round pick in 2000	
June 25, 2000	To New York Rangers: 4th-round pick in 2000; 5th-round pick in 2000	To San Jose Sharks: 4th-round pick in 2000	
August 4, 2000	To New York Rangers: Sandy McCarthy; Conditional draft pick (Note: 4th-round pick in 2001.)	To Carolina Hurricanes: Rob DiMaio; Darren Langdon	
September 25, 2000	To New York Rangers: Conditional draft pick in 2001	To Nashville Predators: Alexei Vasiliev	
October 5, 2000	To New York Rangers: Brad Brown; Michal Grosek	To Chicago Blackhawks: Future considerations (Note: The Rangers agreed to place Stephane Quintal on waivers.)	
November 9, 2000	To New York Rangers: Bert Robertsson	To Columbus Blue Jackets: Jean-Francois Labbe	
December 28, 2000	To New York Rangers: Alexei Gusarov	To Colorado Avalanche: 5th-round pick in 2001	
February 5, 2001	To New York Rangers: Future considerations	To Dallas Stars: John MacLean	
March 1, 2001	To New York Rangers: Colin Forbes	To Ottawa Senators: Eric Lacroix	
March 5, 2001	To New York Rangers: Peter Smrek	To St. Louis Blues: Alexei Gusarov	
March 7, 2001	To New York Rangers: Ryan Tobler	To Nashville Predators: Bert Robertsson	

=== Players acquired ===
Date	Player	Former team	Term	Via	Ref
June 29, 2000	Brandon Dietrich	St. Lawrence University (ECAC)		Free agency	
July 10, 2000	Vladimir Malakhov	New Jersey Devils		Free agency	
July 13, 2000	Mark Messier	Vancouver Canucks	2-year	Free agency	
July 27, 2000	Jeff Ulmer	Houston Aeros (IHL)		Free agency	
September 29, 2000	Andreas Johansson	Calgary Flames		Waiver draft	
January 13, 2001	Jeff Toms	New York Islanders		Waivers	
February 9, 2001	Tony Tuzzolino	Hartford Wolf Pack (AHL)		Free agency	
March 7, 2001	Guy Hebert	Anaheim Mighty Ducks		Waivers	
May 8, 2001	Richard Scott	Hartford Wolf Pack (AHL)		Free agency	

=== Players lost ===
Date	Player	New team	Via (Note: In parentheses is the player's free agency group on July 1 if applicable.)	Ref
June 23, 2000	Mathieu Schneider	Columbus Blue Jackets	Expansion draft	
June 23, 2000	Dmitri Subbotin	Minnesota Wild	Expansion draft	
July 1, 2000	Alexandre Daigle (Note: Daigle retired.)		Contract expiration (UFA)	
July 7, 2000	Kevin Stevens	Philadelphia Flyers	Free agency (III)	
July 7, 2000	P. J. Stock	Montreal Canadiens	Free agency (VI)	
July 28, 2000	Milan Hnilicka	Atlanta Thrashers	Free agency (VI)	
July 28, 2000	Chris Wells	Dallas Stars	Free agency (UFA)	
July 31, 2000	Kevin Hatcher	Carolina Hurricanes	Free agency (III)	
October 5, 2000	Stephane Quintal	Chicago Blackhawks	Waivers	
October 15, 2000	Daniel Goneau	Manitoba Moose (IHL)	Free agency (II)	
October 27, 2000	Chris Kenady	Louisville Panthers (AHL)	Free agency (VI)	
January 2, 2001	Stefan Cherneski		Retirement	
January 12, 2001	Johan Witehall	Montreal Canadiens	Waivers	

=== Signings ===
Date	Player	Term	Contract type	Ref
July 24, 2000	Johan Holmqvist		Entry-level	
July 24, 2000	Vitali Yeremeyev		Entry-level	
July 25, 2000	Martin Richter		Entry-level	
July 31, 2000	Eric Lacroix		Re-signing	
August 10, 2000	David Wilkie		Re-signing	
August 30, 2000	Derek Armstrong		Re-signing	
September 1, 2000	Jason Dawe		Re-signing	
September 7, 2000	Johan Witehall		Re-signing	
September 8, 2000	Drew Bannister		Re-signing	
September 8, 2000	Dale Purinton		Re-signing	
October 4, 2000	Mike Mottau		Entry-level	

== Draft picks ==
New York's picks at the 2000 NHL entry draft in Calgary, Alberta, Canada at the Pengrowth Saddledome.

Round	#	Player	Position	Nationality	College/Junior/Club team (League)
2	64	Filip Novak	D	Czech Republic	Regina Pats (WHL)
3	95	Dominic Moore	C	Canada	Harvard University (NCAA)
4	112	Premysl Duben	D	Czech Republic	HC Dukla Jihlava (Czechoslovak Extraliga)
5	140	Nathan Martz	C	Canada	Chilliwack Chiefs (BCHL)
5	143	Brandon Snee	G	United States	Union College (NCAA)
6	175	Sven Helfenstein	C/RW	Switzerland	Kloten Flyers (NLA)
7	205	Henrik Lundqvist	G	Sweden	Frölunda HC (SEL)
8	238	Dan Eberly	D	United States	R.P.I. (NCAA)
9	269	Martin Richter	D	Czech Republic	SaiPa (FNL)
