= Sean O'Connor (ice hockey) =

Canadian ice hockey player

- Born: October 19, 1981 (age 44) Victoria, British Columbia, Canada
- Height: 6 ft 3 in (191 cm)
- Weight: 223 lb (101 kg; 15 st 13 lb)
- Position: Right wing
- Shot: Right
- Played for: San Antonio Rampage; Cincinnati Mighty Ducks; Augsburger Panther; ERC Ingolstadt; Schwenninger Wild Wings; Straubing Tigers
- NHL draft: 82nd overall, 2000; Florida Panthers
- Playing career: 2002–2016

Sean O'Connor (born October 19, 1981) is a Canadian professional ice hockey player currently an unrestricted free agent who most recently was under contract with the Straubing Tigers in the Deutsche Eishockey Liga (DEL).

== Career ==
O'Connor was originally selected by the Florida Panthers in the third round (82nd overall) of the 2000 NHL entry draft.

He previously played in Germany for Augsburger Panther, ERC Ingolstadt, and the Schwenninger Wild Wings. On March 10, 2015, O'Connor signed as a free agent with his fifth DEL club, the Straubing Tigers, on a one-year deal.

== Career statistics ==
			Regular season					Playoffs
Season	Team	League	GP	G	A	Pts	PIM	GP	G	A	Pts	PIM
1997–98	Victoria Salsa	BCHL	50	9	17	26	145	—	—	—	—	—
1998–99	Victoria Salsa	BCHL	54	18	13	31	196	7	0	2	2	12
1999–2000	Moose Jaw Warriors	WHL	51	5	8	13	166	2	0	0	0	2
2000–01	Moose Jaw Warriors	WHL	71	34	15	49	192	4	0	1	1	15
2001–02	Moose Jaw Warriors	WHL	62	15	19	34	135	12	0	3	3	4
2002–03	San Antonio Rampage	AHL	8	0	0	0	4	1	0	0	0	0
2002–03	Jackson Bandits	ECHL	49	12	11	23	149	1	0	0	0	0
2003–04	San Antonio Rampage	AHL	28	1	0	1	88	—	—	—	—	—
2003–04	Augusta Lynx	ECHL	19	3	4	7	79	—	—	—	—	—
2004–05	Cincinnati Mighty Ducks	AHL	15	0	1	1	28	—	—	—	—	—
2004–05	San Diego Gulls	ECHL	46	20	10	30	142	—	—	—	—	—
2005–06	Las Vegas Wranglers	ECHL	44	19	14	33	71	—	—	—	—	—
2006–07	Las Vegas Wranglers	ECHL	5	0	0	0	4	—	—	—	—	—
2007–08	Phoenix RoadRunners	ECHL	63	27	17	44	124	—	—	—	—	—
2008–09	Victoria Salmon Kings	ECHL	60	19	8	27	68	9	2	3	5	21
2009–10	Ontario Reign	ECHL	35	15	6	21	102	—	—	—	—	—
2010–11	Augsburger Panther	DEL	33	6	6	12	145	—	—	—	—	—
2011–12	Augsburger Panther	DEL	50	12	11	23	140	2	0	0	0	14
2012–13	ERC Ingolstadt	DEL	34	13	8	21	58	3	1	0	1	10
2013–14	EHC Red Bull München	DEL	13	5	1	6	39	—	—	—	—	—
2013–14	Schwenninger Wild Wings	DEL	24	8	5	13	34	—	—	—	—	—
2014–15	Schwenninger Wild Wings	DEL	29	6	5	11	48	—	—	—	—	—
2015–16	Straubing Tigers	DEL	50	12	6	18	81	7	1	0	1	42
ECHL totals			321	115	70	185	739	10	2	3	5	21
DEL totals			233	62	42	104	545	12	2	0	2	66
