= 2000–01 Toronto Maple Leafs season =

NHL hockey team season

2000–01 Toronto Maple Leafs
- Division: 3rd Northeast
- Conference: 7th Eastern
- 2000–01 record: 37–29–11–5
- Home record: 19–11–7–4
- Road record: 18–18–4–1
- Goals for: 232
- Goals against: 207

Team information
- General manager: Pat Quinn
- Coach: Pat Quinn
- Captain: Mats Sundin
- Alternate captains: Steve Thomas; Dmitri Yushkevich
- Arena: Air Canada Centre
- Average attendance: 19,257
- Minor league affiliate: St. John's Maple Leafs

Team leaders
- Goals: Gary Roberts (29)
- Assists: Mats Sundin (46)
- Points: Mats Sundin (74)
- Penalty minutes: Tie Domi (214)
- Plus/minus: Bryan McCabe, Gary Roberts (+16)
- Wins: Curtis Joseph (33)
- Goals against average: Curtis Joseph (2.39)

The 2000–01 Toronto Maple Leafs season was the franchise's 84th season of existence and their 74th season as the Maple Leafs. The team finished third in the Northeast Division with a 37–29–11–5 record (90 points), and qualified for the playoffs for the third year in a row. In the 2001 Stanley Cup playoffs, they swept their rivals, the first-place Ottawa Senators, four games to none in the Eastern Conference Quarterfinals before falling to the New Jersey Devils in seven games in the Eastern Conference Semifinals.

== Off-season ==
Key dates prior to the start of the season:

- The 2000 NHL entry draft
- The free agency period began on July 1.

== Regular season ==
The Leafs scored the fewest short-handed goals in the NHL during the regular season, with just two.

=== Season standings ===
Northeast Division
No.	CR		GP	W	L	T	OTL	GF	GA	Pts
1	2	**Ottawa Senators**	82	48	21	9	4	274	205	109
2	5	**Buffalo Sabres**	82	46	30	5	1	218	184	98
3	7	**Toronto Maple Leafs**	82	37	29	11	5	232	207	90
4	9	Boston Bruins	82	36	30	8	8	227	249	88
5	11	Montreal Canadiens	82	28	40	8	6	206	232	70

Note: CR = Conference rank; GP = Games played; W = Wins; L = Losses; T = Ties; OTL=Overtime loss; GF = Goals for; GA = Goals against; Pts = Points
Bolded teams qualified for the playoffs.

Eastern Conference
R		Div	GP	W	L	T	OTL	GF	GA	Pts
**1**	**Z-** New Jersey Devils	**AT**	**82**	**48**	**19**	**12**	**3**	**295**	**195**	111
**2**	**Y-** Ottawa Senators	**NE**	**82**	**48**	**21**	**9**	**4**	**274**	**205**	109
**3**	**Y-** Washington Capitals	**SE**	**82**	**41**	**27**	**10**	**4**	**233**	**211**	96
**4**	**X-** Philadelphia Flyers	**AT**	**82**	**43**	**25**	**11**	**3**	**240**	**207**	100
**5**	**X-** Buffalo Sabres	**NE**	**82**	**46**	**30**	**5**	**1**	**218**	**184**	98
**6**	**X-** Pittsburgh Penguins	**AT**	**82**	**42**	**28**	**9**	**3**	**281**	**256**	96
**7**	**X-** Toronto Maple Leafs	**NE**	**82**	**37**	**29**	**11**	**5**	**232**	**207**	90
**8**	**X-** Carolina Hurricanes	**SE**	**82**	**38**	**32**	**9**	**3**	**212**	**225**	88
8.5
9	Boston Bruins	NE	82	36	30	8	8	227	249	88
10	New York Rangers	AT	82	33	43	5	1	250	290	72
11	Montreal Canadiens	NE	82	28	40	8	6	206	232	70
12	Florida Panthers	SE	82	22	38	13	9	200	246	66
13	Atlanta Thrashers	SE	82	23	45	12	2	211	289	60
14	Tampa Bay Lightning	SE	82	24	47	6	5	201	280	59
15	New York Islanders	AT	82	21	51	7	3	185	268	52

Divisions: AT – Atlantic, NE – Northeast, SE – Southeast

Z – Clinched conference; Y – Clinched division; X – Clinched playoff spot

== Schedule and results ==
=== Regular season ===
2000–01 regular season
October: 6–5–0–0 (home: 3–2–0–0; road: 3–3–0–0)

Game	Date	Score	Opponent	Record	Recap
1	October 7, 2000	2–0	Montreal Canadiens (2000–01)	1–0–0–0	W
2	October 9, 2000	1–3	Dallas Stars (2000–01)	1–1–0–0	L
3	October 11, 2000	3–2	New York Islanders (2000–01)	2–1–0–0	W
4	October 14, 2000	0–4	Ottawa Senators (2000–01)	2–2–0–0	L
5	October 16, 2000	2–5	@ Vancouver Canucks (2000–01)	2–3–0–0	L
6	October 19, 2000	4–1	@ Edmonton Oilers (2000–01)	3–3–0–0	W
7	October 21, 2000	2–1	@ Calgary Flames (2000–01)	4–3–0–0	W
8	October 25, 2000	6–1	Minnesota Wild (2000–01)	5–3–0–0	W
9	October 27, 2000	1–2	@ Buffalo Sabres (2000–01)	5–4–0–0	L
10	October 28, 2000	2–1 OT	@ Boston Bruins (2000–01)	6–4–0–0	W
11	October 31, 2000	3–4	@ Ottawa Senators (2000–01)	6–5–0–0	L

November: 7–2–3–2 (home: 4–1–2–2; road: 3–1–1–0)

Game	Date	Score	Opponent	Record	Recap
12	November 2, 2000	5–3	New Jersey Devils (2000–01)	7–5–0–0	W
13	November 4, 2000	0–0 OT	@ St. Louis Blues (2000–01)	7–5–1–0	T
14	November 5, 2000	7–1	Boston Bruins (2000–01)	8–5–1–0	W
15	November 8, 2000	5–0	Carolina Hurricanes (2000–01)	9–5–1–0	W
16	November 10, 2000	1–3	@ Carolina Hurricanes (2000–01)	9–6–1–0	L
17	November 11, 2000 †	3–3 OT	Chicago Blackhawks (2000–01)	9–6–2–0	T
18	November 15, 2000	1–2 OT	Philadelphia Flyers (2000–01)	9–6–2–1	OTL
19	November 17, 2000	2–2 OT	Tampa Bay Lightning (2000–01)	9–6–3–1	T
20	November 18, 2000	6–1	@ Montreal Canadiens (2000–01)	10–6–3–1	W
21	November 21, 2000	3–1	@ New York Rangers (2000–01)	11–6–3–1	W
22	November 22, 2000	4–3	Edmonton Oilers (2000–01)	12–6–3–1	W
23	November 25, 2000	2–4	Ottawa Senators (2000–01)	12–7–3–1	L
24	November 29, 2000	5–6 OT	St. Louis Blues (2000–01)	12–7–3–2	OTL
25	November 30, 2000	6–4	@ New York Islanders (2000–01)	13–7–3–2	W

December: 7–5–1–1 (home: 2–1–1–1; road: 5–4–0–0)

Game	Date	Score	Opponent	Record	Recap
26	December 2, 2000	8–2	New York Rangers (2000–01)	14–7–3–2	W
27	December 4, 2000	4–4 OT	Florida Panthers (2000–01)	14–7–4–2	T
28	December 6, 2000	3–0	@ Detroit Red Wings (2000–01)	15–7–4–2	W
29	December 9, 2000	5–1	Pittsburgh Penguins (2000–01)	16–7–4–2	W
30	December 13, 2000	7–4	@ Pittsburgh Penguins (2000–01)	17–7–4–2	W
31	December 15, 2000	2–3	@ New York Islanders (2000–01)	17–8–4–2	L
32	December 16, 2000	5–6 OT	Calgary Flames (2000–01)	17–8–4–3	OTL
33	December 20, 2000	1–3	Nashville Predators (2000–01)	17–9–4–3	L
34	December 21, 2000	0–4	@ Boston Bruins (2000–01)	17–10–4–3	L
35	December 23, 2000	5–2	@ Montreal Canadiens (2000–01)	18–10–4–3	W
36	December 26, 2000	3–5	@ Atlanta Thrashers (2000–01)	18–11–4–3	L
37	December 27, 2000	0–5	@ Pittsburgh Penguins (2000–01)	18–12–4–3	L
38	December 30, 2000	4–1	@ Florida Panthers (2000–01)	19–12–4–3	W
39	December 31, 2000	3–2	@ Tampa Bay Lightning (2000–01)	20–12–4–3	W

January: 5–5–3–1 (home: 3–4–1–0; road: 2–1–2–1)

Game	Date	Score	Opponent	Record	Recap
40	January 3, 2001	1–1 OT	Buffalo Sabres (2000–01)	20–12–5–3	T
41	January 5, 2001	3–3 OT	@ Buffalo Sabres (2000–01)	20–12–6–3	T
42	January 6, 2001	2–3	Washington Capitals (2000–01)	20–13–6–3	L
43	January 10, 2001	1–3	Tampa Bay Lightning (2000–01)	20–14–6–3	L
44	January 12, 2001	3–2	Phoenix Coyotes (2000–01)	21–14–6–3	W
45	January 13, 2001	4–4 OT	@ New Jersey Devils (2000–01)	21–14–7–3	T
46	January 17, 2001	1–2	Los Angeles Kings (2000–01)	21–15–7–3	L
47	January 18, 2001	1–2 OT	@ New York Rangers (2000–01)	21–15–7–4	OTL
48	January 20, 2001	2–0	Buffalo Sabres (2000–01)	22–15–7–4	W
49	January 24, 2001	1–2	Boston Bruins (2000–01)	22–16–7–4	L
50	January 25, 2001	2–1 OT	@ Atlanta Thrashers (2000–01)	23–16–7–4	W
51	January 27, 2001	3–1	New York Rangers (2000–01)	24–16–7–4	W
52	January 29, 2001	1–2	@ St. Louis Blues (2000–01)	24–17–7–4	L
53	January 31, 2001	4–3	@ Carolina Hurricanes (2000–01)	25–17–7–4	W

February: 4–5–3–0 (home: 4–1–3–0; road: 0–4–0–0)

Game	Date	Score	Opponent	Record	Recap
54	February 1, 2001	4–5	@ Washington Capitals (2000–01)	25–18–7–4	L
55	February 7, 2001	7–1	Atlanta Thrashers (2000–01)	26–18–7–4	W
56	February 8, 2001	1–2	@ Detroit Red Wings (2000–01)	26–19–7–4	L
57	February 10, 2001	3–3 OT	Detroit Red Wings (2000–01)	26–19–8–4	T
58	February 14, 2001	2–2 OT	Columbus Blue Jackets (2000–01)	26–19–9–4	T
59	February 15, 2001	2–5	@ Philadelphia Flyers (2000–01)	26–20–9–4	L
60	February 17, 2001	5–5 OT	Colorado Avalanche (2000–01)	26–20–10–4	T
61	February 19, 2001	0–2	New Jersey Devils (2000–01)	26–21–10–4	L
62	February 22, 2001	4–1	Vancouver Canucks (2000–01)	27–21–10–4	W
63	February 24, 2001	5–1	Montreal Canadiens (2000–01)	28–21–10–4	W
64	February 25, 2001	4–6	@ Chicago Blackhawks (2000–01)	28–22–10–4	L
65	February 28, 2001	2–1	San Jose Sharks (2000–01)	29–22–10–4	W

March: 6–6–1–1 (home: 2–2–0–1; road: 4–4–1–0)

Game	Date	Score	Opponent	Record	Recap
66	March 1, 2001	3–2 OT	@ Washington Capitals (2000–01)	30–22–10–4	W
67	March 3, 2001	2–3 OT	Ottawa Senators (2000–01)	30–22–10–5	OTL
68	March 6, 2001	3–1	@ Calgary Flames (2000–01)	31–22–10–5	W
69	March 7, 2001	0–4	@ Edmonton Oilers (2000–01)	31–23–10–5	L
70	March 10, 2001	3–3 OT	@ Vancouver Canucks (2000–01)	31–23–11–5	T
71	March 14, 2001	3–2	Mighty Ducks of Anaheim (2000–01)	32–23–11–5	W
72	March 15, 2001	2–3	@ Tampa Bay Lightning (2000–01)	32–24–11–5	L
73	March 17, 2001	5–3	@ Florida Panthers (2000–01)	33–24–11–5	W
74	March 20, 2001	0–3	@ Buffalo Sabres (2000–01)	33–25–11–5	L
75	March 21, 2001	1–3	Florida Panthers (2000–01)	33–26–11–5	L
76	March 24, 2001	5–3	Philadelphia Flyers (2000–01)	34–26–11–5	W
77	March 28, 2001	0–3	Boston Bruins (2000–01)	34–27–11–5	L
78	March 29, 2001	2–1	@ Philadelphia Flyers (2000–01)	35–27–11–5	W
79	March 31, 2001	1–4	@ Montreal Canadiens (2000–01)	35–28–11–5	L

April: 2–1–0–0 (home: 1–0–0–0; road: 1–1–0–0)

Game	Date	Score	Opponent	Record	Recap
80	April 4, 2001	4–2	New York Islanders (2000–01)	36–28–11–5	W
81	April 6, 2001	1–0	@ Chicago Blackhawks (2000–01)	37–28–11–5	W
82	April 7, 2001	3–5	@ Ottawa Senators (2000–01)	37–29–11–5	L

Legend: W Win (2 points) L Loss (0 points) T Tie (1 point) OTL Overtime loss (1 point)

- † Hockey Hall of Fame Game

=== Playoffs ===
2001 Stanley Cup playoffs
Eastern Conference Quarterfinals vs. (2) Ottawa Senators – Maple Leafs win 4–0

Game	Date	Score	Opponent	Series	Recap
1	April 13, 2001	1–0 OT	@ Ottawa Senators	Maple Leafs lead 1–0	W
2	April 14, 2001	3–0	@ Ottawa Senators	Maple Leafs lead 2–0	W
3	April 16, 2001	3–2 OT	Ottawa Senators	Maple Leafs lead 3–0	W
4	April 18, 2001	3–1	Ottawa Senators	Maple Leafs win 4–0	W

Eastern Conference Semifinals vs. (1) New Jersey Devils – Devils win 4–3

Game	Date	Score	Opponent	Series	Recap
1	April 26, 2001	2–0	@ New Jersey Devils	Maple Leafs lead 1–0	W
2	April 28, 2001	5–6 OT	@ New Jersey Devils	Series tied 1–1	L
3	May 1, 2001	2–3 OT	New Jersey Devils	Devils lead 2–1	L
4	May 3, 2001	3–1	New Jersey Devils	Series tied 2–2	W
5	May 5, 2001	3–2	@ New Jersey Devils	Maple Leafs lead 3–2	W
6	May 7, 2001	2–4	New Jersey Devils	Series tied 3–3	L
7	May 9, 2001	1–5	@ New Jersey Devils	Devils win 4–3	L

Legend: W Win L Loss

== Player statistics ==
=== Scoring ===
- Position abbreviations: C = Centre; D = Defence; G = Goaltender; LW = Left wing; RW = Right wing
- † = Joined team via a transaction (e.g., trade, waivers, signing) during the season. Stats reflect time with the Maple Leafs only.
- ‡ = Left team via a transaction (e.g., trade, waivers, release) during the season. Stats reflect time with the Maple Leafs only.

No.	Player	Pos	Regular season						Playoffs					
No.	Player	Pos	GP	G	A	Pts	+/-	PIM	GP	G	A	Pts	+/-	PIM
13	Mats Sundin	C	82	28	46	74	15	76	11	6	7	13	5	14
7	Gary Roberts	LW	82	29	24	53	16	109	11	2	9	11	5	0
44	Yanic Perreault	C	76	24	28	52	0	52	11	2	3	5	2	4
94	Sergei Berezin	LW	79	22	28	50	2	8	11	2	5	7	1	2
14	Jonas Hoglund	LW	82	23	26	49	1	14	10	0	0	0	−4	4
15	Tomas Kaberle	D	82	6	39	45	10	24	11	1	3	4	4	0
16	Darcy Tucker	RW	82	16	21	37	6	141	11	0	2	2	−2	6
32	Steve Thomas	RW	57	8	26	34	0	46	11	6	3	9	4	4
22	Igor Korolev	RW	73	10	19	29	3	28	11	0	0	0	−3	0
24	Bryan McCabe	D	82	5	24	29	16	123	11	2	3	5	5	16
27	Shayne Corson	C	77	8	18	26	1	189	11	1	1	2	−1	14
10	Garry Valk	RW	74	8	18	26	4	46	5	1	0	1	−1	2
36	Dmitry Yushkevich	D	81	5	19	24	−2	52	11	0	4	4	−4	12
28	Tie Domi	RW	82	13	7	20	2	214	8	0	1	1	0	20
9	Nik Antropov	C	52	6	11	17	5	30	9	2	1	3	2	12
55	Danny Markov	D	59	3	13	16	6	34	11	1	1	2	−3	12
3	Dave Manson	D	74	4	7	11	13	93	2	0	0	0	0	2
43	Nathan Dempsey	D	25	1	9	10	13	4	—	—	—	—	—	—
8	Dmitri Khristich‡	RW	27	3	6	9	8	8	—	—	—	—	—	—
4	Cory Cross	D	41	3	5	8	7	50	11	2	1	3	−1	10
39	Alexei Ponikarovsky	RW	22	1	3	4	−1	14	—	—	—	—	—	—
8	Aki Berg†	D	12	3	0	3	−6	2	11	0	2	2	1	4
23	Petr Svoboda	D	18	1	2	3	−5	10	—	—	—	—	—	—
2	Wade Belak†	D	16	1	1	2	−4	31	—	—	—	—	—	—
21	Adam Mair‡	LW	16	0	2	2	3	14	—	—	—	—	—	—
18	Alyn McCauley	C	14	1	0	1	0	0	10	0	0	0	−4	2
31	Curtis Joseph	G	68	0	1	1		8	11	0	0	0		4
37	Don MacLean	C	3	0	1	1	−2	2	—	—	—	—	—	—
33	David Cooper	D	2	0	0	0	−1	0	—	—	—	—	—	—
19	Jeff Farkas	C	2	0	0	0	−1	2	—	—	—	—	—	—
30	Glenn Healy	G	15	0	0	0		0	—	—	—	—	—	—

=== Goaltending ===
No.	Player	Regular season										Playoffs								
No.	Player	GP	W	L	T	SA	GA	GAA	SV%	SO	TOI	GP	W	L	SA	GA	GAA	SV%	SO	TOI
31	Curtis Joseph	68	33	27	8	1907	163	2.39	.915	6	4100	11	7	4	329	24	2.10	.927	3	685
30	Glenn Healy	15	4	7	3	331	38	2.62	.885	0	871	—	—	—	—	—	—	—	—	—

== Awards and records ==
=== Awards ===
Type	Award/honour	Recipient	Ref
League (in-season)	NHL All-Star Game selection	Mats Sundin	
Team	Molson Cup	Curtis Joseph	

=== Milestones ===
Milestone	Player	Date	Ref
First game	Petr Svoboda	October 7, 2000	
First game	Alexei Ponikarovsky	January 10, 2001	
1,000th game played	Dave Manson	November 17, 2000	
1,000th game played	Shayne Corson	February 14, 2001	

== Transactions ==
The Maple Leafs were involved in the following transactions from June 11, 2000, the day after the deciding game of the 2000 Stanley Cup Final, through June 9, 2001, the day of the deciding game of the 2001 Stanley Cup Final.

=== Trades ===
Date	Details		Ref
June 25, 2000	To Anaheim Mighty Ducks: Rights to Jonathan Hedstrom	To Toronto Maple Leafs: 6th-round pick in 2000; 7th-round pick in 2000	
September 26, 2000	To Philadelphia Flyers: Chris McAllister	To Toronto Maple Leafs: Rights to Regan Kelly	
October 2, 2000	To Chicago Blackhawks: Alexander Karpovtsev; 4th-round pick in 2001	To Toronto Maple Leafs: Bryan McCabe	
October 29, 2000	To Dallas Stars: Gerald Diduck	To Toronto Maple Leafs: Future considerations	
December 11, 2000	To Washington Capitals: Dmitri Khristich	To Toronto Maple Leafs: Tampa Bay's 3rd-round pick in 2001	
February 20, 2001	To Tampa Bay Lightning: Konstantin Kalmikov	To Toronto Maple Leafs: Maxim Galanov	
March 13, 2001	To Los Angeles Kings: Adam Mair; 2nd-round pick in 2001	To Toronto Maple Leafs: Aki Berg	

=== Players acquired ===
Date	Player	Former team	Term	Via	Ref
July 4, 2000	Shayne Corson	Montreal Canadiens	multi-year	Free agency	
July 4, 2000	Gary Roberts	Carolina Hurricanes	multi-year	Free agency	
August 16, 2000	Dave Manson	Dallas Stars	2-year	Free agency	
October 5, 2000	David Cooper	Kassel Huskies (DEL)		Free agency	
February 16, 2001	Wade Belak	Calgary Flames		Waivers	
March 16, 2001	Mike Minard	St. John's Maple Leafs (AHL)		Free agency	
June 6, 2001	Christian Chartier	Prince George Cougars (WHL)		Free agency	

=== Players lost ===
Date	Player	New team	Via (Note: In parentheses is the player's free agency group on July 1 if applicable.)	Ref
June 23, 2000	Kevyn Adams	Columbus Blue Jackets	Expansion draft	
June 23, 2000	Tommi Rajamaki	Columbus Blue Jackets	Expansion draft	
June 29, 2000	Wendel Clark		Retirement (III)	
July 1, 2000	Jason Bonsignore (Note: Bonsignore was inactive during the 2000–01 and 2001–02 seasons.)		Contract expiration (UFA)	
July 1, 2000	Marc Robitaille (Note: Robitaille retired.)		Contract expiration (UFA)	
July 1, 2000	Brian Wiseman (Note: Wiseman retired.)		Contract expiration (UFA)	
July 3, 2000	Kris King	Chicago Blackhawks (Note: King signed with Chicago on October 9, 2000.)	Buyout	
July 19, 2000	Terran Sandwith	Edmonton Oilers	Free agency (VI)	
August 1, 2000	Lonny Bohonos	HC Davos (NLA)	Free agency (II) (Note: Toronto retained Bohonos’ NHL rights through the 2005–06 season.)	
August 1, 2000	Justin Hocking	Phoenix Coyotes	Free agency	
August 14, 2000	Greg Andrusak	San Jose Sharks	Free agency (VI)	
September 2000	Mark Deyell	Hamilton Bulldogs (AHL)	Free agency (UFA)	
N/A	Tyler Harlton	St. John's Maple Leafs (AHL)	Free agency (UFA)	
N/A	Francis Larivee	New Orleans Brass (ECHL)	Free agency (UFA)	
October 4, 2000	Ryan Pepperall	Florida Everblades (ECHL)	Free agency (UFA)	

=== Signings ===
Date	Player	Term	Contract type	Ref
June 29, 2000	Nathan Dempsey		Re-signing	
June 29, 2000	Chris McAllister		Re-signing	
June 29, 2000	Petr Svoboda		Entry-level	
July 17, 2000	Luca Cereda	multi-year	Entry-level	
August 1, 2000	Jonas Hoglund	1-year	Re-signing	
August 1, 2000	Alyn McCauley		Re-signing	
August 1, 2000	Yanic Perreault		Re-signing	
August 11, 2000	Danny Markov	multi-year	Re-signing	
August 15, 2000	Glenn Healy	2-year	Re-signing	
September 4, 2000	Donald MacLean		Re-signing	
September 6, 2000	D. J. Smith	2-year	Re-signing	
November 2, 2000	Darcy Tucker	2-year	Extension	

== Draft picks ==
Toronto's draft picks at the 2000 NHL entry draft held at the Pengrowth Saddledome in Calgary, Alberta.

Round	#	Player	Nationality	College/Junior/Club team (League)
1	24	Brad Boyes	Canada	Erie Otters (OHL)
2	51	Kris Vernarsky	United States	Plymouth Whalers (OHL)
3	70	Mikael Tellqvist	Sweden	Djurgårdens IF (Sweden)
3	90	Jean-Francois Racine	Canada	Drummondville Voltigeurs (QMJHL)
4	100	Miguel Delisle	Canada	Ottawa 67's (OHL)
6	179	Vadim Sozinov	Kazakhstan	Metallurg Novokuznetsk (Russia)
7	209	Markus Seikola	Finland	TPS Jr. (Finland)
7	223	Lubos Velebny	Slovakia	HKm Zvolen Jr. (Slovakia)
8	254	Alexander Shinkar	Russia	Severstal Cherepovets (Russia)
9	265	Jean-Philippe Cote	Canada	Cape Breton Screaming Eagles (QMJHL)

== See also ==
- 2000–01 NHL season
