= 2000–01 Philadelphia Flyers season =

NHL hockey team season

2000–01 Philadelphia Flyers
- Division: 2nd Atlantic
- Conference: 4th Eastern
- 2000–01 record: 43–25–11–3
- Home record: 26–11–4–0
- Road record: 17–14–7–3
- Goals for: 240
- Goals against: 207

Team information
- General manager: Bob Clarke
- Coach: Craig Ramsay (Oct.–Dec.); Bill Barber (Dec.–Apr.)
- Captain: Eric Desjardins
- Alternate captains: John LeClair; Mark Recchi
- Arena: First Union Center
- Average attendance: 19,576
- Minor league affiliates: Philadelphia Phantoms; Trenton Titans

Team leaders
- Goals: Keith Primeau (34)
- Assists: Mark Recchi (50)
- Points: Mark Recchi (77)
- Penalty minutes: Luke Richardson (131)
- Plus/minus: Simon Gagne (+24)
- Wins: Roman Cechmanek (35)
- Goals against average: Roman Cechmanek (2.01)

The 2000–01 Philadelphia Flyers season was the franchise's 34th season in the National Hockey League (NHL). The Flyers lost in the first round to the Buffalo Sabres in six games.

== Off-season ==
Craig Ramsay retained the head coaching position as Roger Neilson was not asked to return.

== Regular season ==
Without Eric Lindros, who sat out the entire season awaiting a trade, while also suffering through John LeClair's 66-game absence and Brian Boucher's early erratic play in goal, the club went into an early tailspin. The team began the year 3–6–4 and at one point had six regulars out of the lineup. Keith Jones, who never fully recovered from the prior knee problems despite surgery last season, was forced to retire eight games into the schedule.

Not wanting to bank on the inexperience of Maxime Ouellet, the team recalled Roman Cechmanek, a former star goalie in the Czech Republic, from the Philadelphia Phantoms in early November and the move paid off as he recorded a pair of shutouts in his first three games. The Flyers won six in a row prior to Thanksgiving to climb above .500, but Ramsay's inability to rally the troops cost him his job. After being badly outplayed in early December losses to Ottawa (5–3) and Detroit (5–1), he was replaced by former Flyer great Bill Barber with the team sinking at 12–12–4.

Barber's high-energy, old-time hockey approach struck a chord, and the club went unbeaten in his first eight games behind the bench (5–0–3). Philly ran off an 8–2–1 stretch at the turn of the new year, then after a five-game win streak after the All-Star break found themselves atop the Atlantic Division.

Unfortunately, injuries and poor play followed. Simon Gagne was lost with a shoulder injury in a scoreless tie with the Tampa Bay Lightning in late February. In the middle of a 1–4–1 stretch in late March, Keith Primeau suffered a leg injury and missed the rest of the regular season. Despite faltering down the stretch, the Flyers finished with the fourth seed in the Eastern Conference.

Primeau led the team with 34 goals and Mark Recchi posted team-best 50 assists and 77 points. Dan McGillis and Eric Desjardins formed a potent offensive duo on the back line, combining for 29 goals and 97 points. Cechmanek recorded a franchise rookie record 10 shutouts and finished second in voting for the Vezina Trophy.

The Flyers were the most disciplined team in the League, with just 314 power-play opportunities against.

=== Season standings ===
Atlantic Division
No.	CR		GP	W	L	T	OTL	GF	GA	Pts
1	1	**New Jersey Devils**	82	48	19	12	3	295	195	111
2	4	**Philadelphia Flyers**	82	43	25	11	3	240	207	100
3	6	**Pittsburgh Penguins**	82	42	28	9	3	281	256	96
4	10	New York Rangers	82	33	43	5	1	250	290	72
5	15	New York Islanders	82	21	51	7	3	185	268	52

Note: CR = Conference rank; GP = Games played; W = Wins; L = Losses; T = Ties; OTL = Overtime loss; GF = Goals for; GA = Goals against; Pts = Points
Bolded teams qualified for the playoffs.

Eastern Conference
R		Div	GP	W	L	T	OTL	GF	GA	Pts
**1**	**Z-** New Jersey Devils	**AT**	**82**	**48**	**19**	**12**	**3**	**295**	**195**	111
**2**	**Y-** Ottawa Senators	**NE**	**82**	**48**	**21**	**9**	**4**	**274**	**205**	109
**3**	**Y-** Washington Capitals	**SE**	**82**	**41**	**27**	**10**	**4**	**233**	**211**	96
**4**	**X-** Philadelphia Flyers	**AT**	**82**	**43**	**25**	**11**	**3**	**240**	**207**	100
**5**	**X-** Buffalo Sabres	**NE**	**82**	**46**	**30**	**5**	**1**	**218**	**184**	98
**6**	**X-** Pittsburgh Penguins	**AT**	**82**	**42**	**28**	**9**	**3**	**281**	**256**	96
**7**	**X-** Toronto Maple Leafs	**NE**	**82**	**37**	**29**	**11**	**5**	**232**	**207**	90
**8**	**X-** Carolina Hurricanes	**SE**	**82**	**38**	**32**	**9**	**3**	**212**	**225**	88
8.5
9	Boston Bruins	NE	82	36	30	8	8	227	249	88
10	New York Rangers	AT	82	33	43	5	1	250	290	72
11	Montreal Canadiens	NE	82	28	40	8	6	206	232	70
12	Florida Panthers	SE	82	22	38	13	9	200	246	66
13	Atlanta Thrashers	SE	82	23	45	12	2	211	289	60
14	Tampa Bay Lightning	SE	82	24	47	6	5	201	280	59
15	New York Islanders	AT	82	21	51	7	3	185	268	52

Divisions: AT – Atlantic, NE – Northeast, SE – Southeast

Z – Clinched conference; Y – Clinched division; X – Clinched playoff spot

== Playoffs ==
The Flyers lost in the first round to the Buffalo Sabres in six games.

== Schedule and results ==
=== Preseason ===
2000 preseason
Preseason: 5–3–0 (home: 4–0–0; road: 1–3–0)

Game	Date	Score	Opponent	Record	Recap
1^{[a]}	September 14	4–2	@ New York Islanders	1–0–0	W
2	September 15	2–1	New York Islanders	2–0–0	W
3	September 16	5–1	New York Rangers	3–0–0	W
4	September 19	3–4	@ New York Rangers	3–1–0	L
5	September 21	3–2	Washington Capitals	4–1–0	W
6	September 23	2–4	@ New Jersey Devils	4–2–0	L
7	September 27	4–1	New Jersey Devils	5–2–0	W
8	September 30	1–2	@ Washington Capitals	5–3–0	L
Notes:^{a} Game played at Sovereign Bank Arena in Trenton, New Jersey.

Legend: W Win (2 points) L Loss (0 points) T Tie (1 point) OTL Overtime loss (1 point)

=== Regular season ===
2000–01 regular season
October: 3–5–3–0, 9 points (home: 2–3–2–0; road: 1–2–1–0)

Game	Date	Score	Opponent	Decision	Record	Points	Recap
1	October 5	6–3	Vancouver Canucks	Boucher	1–0–0–0	2	W
2	October 7	1–5	Boston Bruins	Boucher	1–1–0–0	2	L
3	October 11	3–3 OT	@ Minnesota Wild	Boucher	1–1–1–0	3	T
4	October 12	1–4	@ Dallas Stars	Ouellet	1–2–1–0	3	L
5	October 14	3–6	@ Phoenix Coyotes	Boucher	1–3–1–0	3	L
6	October 17	1–6	Ottawa Senators	Boucher	1–4–1–0	3	L
7	October 19	3–3 OT	Montreal Canadiens	Cechmanek	1–4–2–0	4	T
8	October 21	3–4	Mighty Ducks of Anaheim	Cechmanek	1–5–2–0	4	L
9	October 24	5–4	@ New York Rangers	Boucher	2–5–2–0	6	W
10	October 26	3–0	New York Rangers	Boucher	3–5–2–0	8	W
11	October 29	1–1 OT	Washington Capitals	Boucher	3–5–3–0	9	T

November: 8–5–1–0, 17 points (home: 4–3–0–0; road: 4–2–1–0)

Game	Date	Score	Opponent	Decision	Record	Points	Recap
12	November 1	1–1 OT	@ New Jersey Devils	Boucher	3–5–4–0	10	T
13	November 2	1–3	Nashville Predators	Boucher	3–6–4–0	10	L
14	November 4	3–0	Buffalo Sabres	Cechmanek	4–6–4–0	12	W
15	November 8	2–5	@ Pittsburgh Penguins	Boucher	4–7–4–0	12	L
16	November 9	2–0	Edmonton Oilers	Cechmanek	5–7–4–0	14	W
17	November 11	4–3	Ottawa Senators	Cechmanek	6–7–4–0	16	W
18	November 15	2–1 OT	@ Toronto Maple Leafs	Cechmanek	7–7–4–0	18	W
19	November 17	3–2 OT	@ Atlanta Thrashers	Cechmanek	8–7–4–0	20	W
20	November 18	5–3	Washington Capitals	Boucher	9–7–4–0	22	W
21	November 22	3–1	@ Buffalo Sabres	Cechmanek	10–7–4–0	24	W
22	November 24	0–1	Pittsburgh Penguins	Cechmanek	10–8–4–0	24	L
23	November 26	1–2	Phoenix Coyotes	Cechmanek	10–9–4–0	24	L
24	November 29	4–3	@ Columbus Blue Jackets	Boucher	11–9–4–0	26	W
25	November 30	0–2	@ Carolina Hurricanes	Cechmanek	11–10–4–0	26	L

December: 6–4–3–0, 15 points (home: 5–0–0–0; road: 1–4–3–0)

Game	Date	Score	Opponent	Decision	Record	Points	Recap
26	December 2	3–5	@ Ottawa Senators	Cechmanek	11–11–4–0	26	L
27	December 6	6–3	Tampa Bay Lightning	Boucher	12–11–4–0	28	W
28	December 8	1–5	@ Detroit Red Wings	Boucher	12–12–4–0	28	L
29	December 10	5–2	New York Islanders	Cechmanek	13–12–4–0	30	W
30	December 12	2–2 OT	@ Nashville Predators	Cechmanek	13–12–5–0	31	T
31	December 13	3–3 OT	@ Colorado Avalanche	Boucher	13–12–6–0	32	T
32	December 16	6–3	New Jersey Devils	Cechmanek	14–12–6–0	34	W
33	December 19	4–4 OT	@ Boston Bruins	Boucher	14–12–7–0	35	T
34	December 21	4–3	San Jose Sharks	Cechmanek	15–12–7–0	37	W
35	December 23	2–1 OT	Carolina Hurricanes	Cechmanek	16–12–7–0	39	W
36	December 27	5–2	@ Florida Panthers	Cechmanek	17–12–7–0	41	W
37	December 28	3–4	@ Tampa Bay Lightning	Boucher	17–13–7–0	41	L
38	December 30	3–6	@ Washington Capitals	Boucher	17–14–7–0	41	L

January: 9–2–2–1, 21 points (home: 2–1–1–0; road: 7–1–1–1)

Game	Date	Score	Opponent	Decision	Record	Points	Recap
39	January 2	1–1 OT	@ New Jersey Devils	Cechmanek	17–14–8–0	42	T
40	January 5	6–4	@ Atlanta Thrashers	Cechmanek	18–14–8–0	44	W
41	January 6	2–2 OT	Atlanta Thrashers	Cechmanek	18–14–9–0	45	T
42	January 8	2–1 OT	@ St. Louis Blues	Cechmanek	19–14–9–0	47	W
43	January 12	3–0	@ Tampa Bay Lightning	Cechmanek	20–14–9–0	49	W
44	January 13	4–1	@ Florida Panthers	Cechmanek	21–14–9–0	51	W
45	January 16	3–4 OT	@ New York Rangers	Cechmanek	21–14–9–1	52	OTL
46	January 18	1–7	New Jersey Devils	Cechmanek	21–15–9–1	52	L
47	January 20	5–3	Florida Panthers	Cechmanek	22–15–9–1	54	W
48	January 22	3–0	Los Angeles Kings	Cechmanek	23–15–9–1	56	W
49	January 25	5–1	@ Chicago Blackhawks	Boucher	24–15–9–1	58	W
50	January 27	4–3	@ Carolina Hurricanes	Cechmanek	25–15–9–1	60	W
51	January 28	2–4	@ Washington Capitals	Boucher	25–16–9–1	60	L
52	January 31	5–1	@ Pittsburgh Penguins	Cechmanek	26–16–9–1	62	W

February: 7–3–1–1, 16 points (home: 5–1–1–0; road: 2–2–0–1)

Game	Date	Score	Opponent	Decision	Record	Points	Recap
53	February 1	2–0	New York Islanders	Cechmanek	27–16–9–1	64	W
54	February 6	3–4	@ Boston Bruins	Boucher	27–17–9–1	64	L
55	February 7	4–9	@ Pittsburgh Penguins	Cechmanek	27–18–9–1	64	L
56	February 9	5–2	@ New York Islanders	Cechmanek	28–18–9–1	66	W
57	February 14	3–1	@ New York Islanders	Cechmanek	29–18–9–1	68	W
58	February 15	5–2	Toronto Maple Leafs	Cechmanek	30–18–9–1	70	W
59	February 17	5–1	Atlanta Thrashers	Cechmanek	31–18–9–1	72	W
60	February 19	4–0	Carolina Hurricanes	Cechmanek	32–18–9–1	74	W
61	February 22	3–4 OT	@ New York Islanders	Cechmanek	32–18–9–2	75	OTL
62	February 24	0–0 OT	Tampa Bay Lightning	Cechmanek	32–18–10–2	76	T
63	February 25	2–1	New York Rangers	Cechmanek	33–18–10–2	78	W
64	February 27	2–3	Montreal Canadiens	Cechmanek	33–19–10–2	78	L

March: 8–5–1–0, 17 points (home: 7–2–0–0; road: 1–3–1–0)

Game	Date	Score	Opponent	Decision	Record	Points	Recap
65	March 1	2–0	Buffalo Sabres	Cechmanek	34–19–10–2	80	W
66	March 3	1–3	@ Montreal Canadiens	Boucher	34–20–10–2	80	L
67	March 5	6–4	Boston Bruins	Cechmanek	35–20–10–2	82	W
68	March 8	5–2	Calgary Flames	Cechmanek	36–20–10–2	84	W
69	March 10	2–3	New Jersey Devils	Cechmanek	36–21–10–2	84	L
70	March 13	5–2	St. Louis Blues	Cechmanek	37–21–10–2	86	W
71	March 15	3–0	Minnesota Wild	Cechmanek	38–21–10–2	88	W
72	March 17	2–1	New York Rangers	Cechmanek	39–21–10–2	90	W
73	March 19	4–2	@ Edmonton Oilers	Boucher	40–21–10–2	92	W
74	March 22	1–3	@ Calgary Flames	Boucher	40–22–10–2	92	L
75	March 24	3–5	@ Toronto Maple Leafs	Cechmanek	40–23–10–2	92	L
76	March 26	3–3 OT	@ Ottawa Senators	Cechmanek	40–23–11–2	93	T
77	March 29	1–2	Toronto Maple Leafs	Cechmanek	40–24–11–2	93	L
78	March 31	1–0	Detroit Red Wings	Cechmanek	41–24–11–2	95	W

April: 2–1–0–1, 5 points (home: 1–1–0–0; road: 1–0–0–1)

Game	Date	Score	Opponent	Decision	Record	Points	Recap
79	April 3	1–2	Florida Panthers	Cechmanek	41–25–11–2	95	L
80	April 5	2–3 OT	@ Montreal Canadiens	Cechmanek	41–25–11–3	96	OTL
81	April 7	4–3 OT	Pittsburgh Penguins	Cechmanek	42–25–11–3	98	W
82	April 8	2–1	@ Buffalo Sabres	Cechmanek	43–25–11–3	100	W

Legend: W Win (2 points) L Loss (0 points) T Tie (1 point) OTL Overtime loss (1 point)

=== Playoffs ===
2001 Stanley Cup playoffs
Eastern Conference quarterfinals vs. Buffalo Sabres – Sabres win 4–2

Game	Date	Score	Opponent	Decision	Series	Recap
1	April 11	1–2	Buffalo Sabres	Cechmanek	Sabres lead 1–0	L
2	April 14	3–4 OT	Buffalo Sabres	Cechmanek	Sabres lead 2–0	L
3	April 16	3–2	@ Buffalo Sabres	Cechmanek	Sabres lead 2–1	W
4	April 17	3–4 OT	@ Buffalo Sabres	Cechmanek	Sabres lead 3–1	L
5	April 19	1–3	Buffalo Sabres	Cechmanek	Sabres lead 3–2	W
6	April 21	0–8	@ Buffalo Sabres	Cechmanek	Sabres win 4–2	L

Legend: W Win L Loss

== Player statistics ==
=== Scoring ===
- Position abbreviations: C = Center; D = Defense; G = Goaltender; LW = Left wing; RW = Right wing
- † = Joined team via a transaction (e.g., trade, waivers, signing) during the season. Stats reflect time with the Flyers only.
- ‡ = Left team via a transaction (e.g., trade, waivers, release) during the season. Stats reflect time with the Flyers only.

No.	Player	Pos	Regular season						Playoffs					
No.	Player	Pos	GP	G	A	Pts	+/-	PIM	GP	G	A	Pts	+/-	PIM
8	Mark Recchi	RW	69	27	50	77	15	33	6	2	2	4	−3	2
25	Keith Primeau	C	71	34	39	73	17	76	4	0	3	3	−3	8
12	Simon Gagne	LW	69	27	32	59	24	18	6	2	4	6	−2	2
18	Daymond Langkow	C	71	13	41	54	12	50	6	3	0	3	−2	0
3	Dan McGillis	D	82	14	35	49	13	86	6	1	0	1	−4	6
37	Eric Desjardins	D	79	15	33	48	−3	50	6	1	1	2	−2	0
26 (Note: Fedotenko wore number 50 in his first game.)	Ruslan Fedotenko	LW	74	16	20	36	8	72	6	0	1	1	−4	4
92	Rick Tocchet	RW	60	14	22	36	10	83	6	0	1	1	−2	6
14	Justin Williams	RW	63	12	13	25	6	22	—	—	—	—	—	—
15	Peter White	C	77	9	16	25	1	16	3	0	0	0	−1	0
19	Paul Ranheim	LW	80	10	7	17	2	14	6	0	2	2	2	2
23	Michal Sykora	D	49	5	11	16	9	26	6	0	1	1	0	0
11	Jody Hull	RW	71	7	8	15	−1	10	6	0	0	0	1	4
28	Kent Manderville	C	82	5	10	15	−2	47	6	1	2	3	2	2
43	Andy Delmore	D	66	5	9	14	2	16	2	1	0	1	−1	2
6	Chris Therien	D	73	2	12	14	22	48	6	1	0	1	−4	8
10	John LeClair	LW	16	7	5	12	2	0	6	1	2	3	−2	2
29 (Note: Fedoruk wore number 52 in his first ten games before switching numbers after Odjick was traded.)	Todd Fedoruk	RW	53	5	5	10	0	109	2	0	0	0	0	20
17	Kevin Stevens‡	LW	23	2	7	9	−2	18	—	—	—	—	—	—
22	Luke Richardson	D	82	2	6	8	23	131	6	0	0	0	−3	4
42	Michel Picard	LW	7	1	4	5	6	0	—	—	—	—	—	—
24	Chris McAllister	D	60	2	2	4	1	124	2	0	0	0	1	0
29	Gino Odjick‡	LW	17	1	3	4	0	28	—	—	—	—	—	—
44	P. J. Stock†	C	31	1	3	4	−2	78	2	0	0	0	−2	0
38	Derek Plante	C	12	1	2	3	0	4	5	0	1	1	−3	0
9	Mark Greig	RW	7	1	1	2	−2	4	—	—	—	—	—	—
9	Dean McAmmond†	LW	10	1	1	2	−1	0	4	0	0	0	0	2
21	Petr Hubacek	C	6	1	0	1	−1	2	—	—	—	—	—	—
32	Roman Cechmanek	G	59	0	1	1		4	6	0	0	0		0
33	Brian Boucher	G	27	0	0	0		2	1	0	0	0		0
20	Tomas Divisek	LW	2	0	0	0	−1	0	—	—	—	—	—	—
20	Keith Jones‡	RW	8	0	0	0	−5	4	—	—	—	—	—	—
47	Kirby Law	RW	1	0	0	0	−1	0	—	—	—	—	—	—
49	Maxime Ouellet	G	2	0	0	0		0	—	—	—	—	—	—
2	Brad Tiley	D	2	0	0	0	−1	0	—	—	—	—	—	—
36	Steve Washburn†	C	3	0	0	0	0	0	—	—	—	—	—	—

=== Goaltending ===
No.	Player	Regular season											Playoffs									
No.	Player	GP	GS	W	L	T	SA	GA	GAA	SV%	SO	TOI	GP	GS	W	L	SA	GA	GAA	SV%	SO	TOI
32	Roman Cechmanek	59	57	35	15	6	1464	115	2.01	.921	10	3,431	6	6	2	4	165	18	3.12	.891	0	347
33	Brian Boucher	27	24	8	12	5	644	80	3.27	.876	1	1,470	1	0	0	0	17	3	4.92	.824	0	37
49	Maxime Ouellet	2	1	0	1	0	27	3	2.38	.889	0	76	—	—	—	—	—	—	—	—	—	—

== Awards and records ==
=== Awards ===
Type	Award/honor	Recipient	Ref
League (annual)	Jack Adams Award	Bill Barber	
League (annual)	NHL second All-Star team	Roman Cechmanek (Goaltender)	
League (in-season)	NHL All-Star Game selection	Roman Cechmanek	
League (in-season)	NHL All-Star Game selection	Simon Gagne (Note: Gagne was an injury replacement for Vincent Damphousse of the San Jose Sharks.)	
League (in-season)	NHL Player of the Week	Roman Cechmanek (January 15)	
Team	Barry Ashbee Trophy	Dan McGillis	
Team	Bobby Clarke Trophy	Roman Cechmanek	
Team	Pelle Lindbergh Memorial Trophy	Simon Gagne	
Team	Pelle Lindbergh Memorial Trophy	Dan McGillis	
Team	Toyota Cup	Roman Cechmanek	
Team	Yanick Dupre Memorial Class Guy Award	Keith Primeau	

=== Records ===
Among the team records set during the 2000–01 season was the Flyers taking two minutes and nineteen seconds to score the fastest three goals from the start of a period in team history on January 5 against the Atlanta Thrashers. The Flyers three overtime losses during the season tied the mark for fewest set during the previous season.

=== Milestones ===
Milestone	Player	Date	Ref
First game	Petr Hubacek	October 5, 2000	
First game	Justin Williams	October 5, 2000	
First game	Maxime Ouellet	October 7, 2000	
First game	Roman Cechmanek	October 17, 2000	
First game	Ruslan Fedotenko	October 24, 2000	
First game	Todd Fedoruk	November 1, 2000	
First game	Tomas Divisek	February 24, 2001	
First game	Kirby Law	March 5, 2001	
600th assist	Mark Recchi	January 31, 2001	
1000th game played	Luke Richardson	February 1, 2001	
1000th point	Mark Recchi	March 13, 2001	

== Transactions ==
The Flyers were involved in the following transactions from June 11, 2000, the day after the deciding game of the 2000 Stanley Cup Final, through June 9, 2001, the day of the deciding game of the 2001 Stanley Cup Final.

=== Trades ===
Date	Details		Ref
June 12, 2000	To Philadelphia Flyers: Mark Janssens	To Chicago Blackhawks: 9th-round pick in 2000	
June 25, 2000	To Philadelphia Flyers: 6th-round pick in 2000; Montreal's 7th-round pick in 2000; Toronto's 9th-round pick in 2000	To Tampa Bay Lightning: 4th-round pick in 2000	
June 25, 2000	To Philadelphia Flyers: 4th-round pick in 2001	To New York Islanders: John Vanbiesbrouck (Note: The Flyers agreed to pay $1.25 million of Vanbiesbrouck's $3.5 million salary for the 2000–01 season.)	
September 26, 2000	To Philadelphia Flyers: Chris McAllister	To Toronto Maple Leafs: Rights to Regan Kelly	
September 29, 2000	To Philadelphia Flyers: Detroit's 3rd-round pick in 2001	To Nashville Predators: Mark Eaton	
December 7, 2000	To Philadelphia Flyers: P. J. Stock; 6th-round pick in 2001	To Montreal Canadiens: Gino Odjick	
January 14, 2001	To Philadelphia Flyers: John Slaney	To Pittsburgh Penguins: Kevin Stevens	
February 13, 2001	To Philadelphia Flyers: Rights to Matt Zultek	To Boston Bruins: 9th-round pick in 2001	
March 13, 2001	To Philadelphia Flyers: Dean McAmmond	To Chicago Blackhawks: 3rd-round pick in 2001	
March 13, 2001	To Philadelphia Flyers: Matt Herr	To Washington Capitals: Dean Melanson	
May 24, 2001	To Philadelphia Flyers: Mike Watt	To Nashville Predators: Mikhail Chernov	

=== Players acquired ===
Date	Player	Former team	Term	Via	Ref
July 6, 2000	Michal Sykora	HC Sparta Praha (ELH)	multi-year	Free agency	
July 7, 2000	Kevin Stevens	New York Rangers	1-year	Free agency	
July 12, 2000	Joe DiPenta	Halifax Mooseheads (QMJHL)		Free agency	
July 14, 2000	Brad Tiley	Phoenix Coyotes	multi-year	Free agency	
July 24, 2000	Rob Murray	Edmonton Oilers	multi-year	Free agency	
July 26, 2000	Derek Plante	Chicago Blackhawks	1-year	Free agency	
August 14, 2000	Michel Picard	Edmonton Oilers	2-year	Free agency	
August 25, 2000	Brian Regan	Missouri River Otters (UHL)	1-year	Free agency	
November 21, 2000	Steve Washburn	Kloten Flyers (NLA)	1-year	Free agency	
December 21, 2000	Jim Vandermeer	Red Deer Rebels (WHL)	3-year	Free agency	

=== Players lost ===
Date	Player	New team	Via (Note: In parentheses is the player's free agency group on July 1 if applicable.)	Ref
June 23, 2000	Artem Anisimov	Minnesota Wild	Expansion draft	
June 23, 2000	Martin Streit	Columbus Blue Jackets	Expansion draft	
July 1, 2000	Jeff Lank (Note: Lank retired.)		Contract expiration (VI)	
July 6, 2000	Mark Janssens	Chicago Blackhawks	Waivers	
July 7, 2000	Craig Berube	Washington Capitals	Free agency (III)	
July 12, 2000	Todd White	Ottawa Senators	Free agency (VI)	
July 14, 2000	Adam Burt	Atlanta Thrashers	Free agency (III)	
July 18, 2000	Valeri Zelepukin	Chicago Blackhawks	Free agency (III)	
July 26, 2000	Jeff Tory	Dallas Stars	Free agency (UFA)	
July 26, 2000	Steve Washburn	Kloten Flyers (NLA)	Free agency (II)	
August 15, 2000	Jim Montgomery	San Jose Sharks	Free agency (UFA)	
August 21, 2000	Bujar Amidovski	Carolina Hurricanes	Free agency	
August 24, 2000	Mike Maneluk	Columbus Blue Jackets	Free agency (VI)	
August 29, 2000	Ulf Samuelsson (Note: Samuelsson announced his retirement on February 12, 2001.)		Buyout	
N/A	Matt Henderson	Norfolk Admirals (AHL)	Free agency (UFA)	
October 5, 2000	Ryan Bast	Hartford Wolf Pack (AHL)	Free agency (UFA)	
November 3, 2000	Travis Brigley	Cardiff Devils (BISL)	Free agency (UFA)	
November 8, 2000	Zarley Zalapski	Houston Aeros (IHL)	Free agency	
November 21, 2000	Keith Jones		Retirement	
November 27, 2000	Chris Albert	Fresno Falcons (WCHL)	Free agency (UFA)	
December 2, 2000	Francis Belanger	Quebec Citadelles (AHL) (Note: Belanger joined Quebec in January 2001.)	Release	
December 29, 2000	Sean O'Brien	Tappara (Liiga)	Free agency (VI)	
February 3, 2001	Rob Murray	Springfield Falcons (AHL) (Note: Originally loaned to Springfield on February 3, Murray signed a contract with Springfield after the Flyers bought out his contract.)	Buyout	
May 15, 2001	Michel Picard	Adler Mannheim (DEL)	Free agency	
June 5, 2001	Michal Sykora	HC Pardubice (ELH) (Note: Sykora signed with HC Pardubice on July 19, 2001.)	Release	

=== Signings ===
Date	Player	Term	Contract type	Ref
July 6, 2000	Rick Tocchet	2-year	Re-signing	
July 13, 2000	Jody Hull	1-year	Re-signing	
July 17, 2000	Roman Cechmanek	2-year	Signing	
July 25, 2000	Andy Delmore	2-year	Re-signing	
August 11, 2000	John LeClair	1-year	Arbitration award	
August 31, 2000	Brian Boucher	2-year	Re-signing	
September 9, 2000	Chris Therien	4-year	Re-signing	
September 13, 2000	Maxime Ouellet	3-year	Entry-level	
September 23, 2000	Justin Williams	3-year	Entry-level	
March 6, 2001	Paul Ranheim	2-year	Extension	
June 5, 2001	Chris McAllister	3-year	Extension	

== Draft picks ==
Philadelphia's picks at the 2000 NHL entry draft, which was held at the Canadian Airlines Saddledome in Calgary on June 24–25, 2000. The Flyers traded their second-round pick, 63rd overall, Rod Brind'Amour, and Jean-Marc Pelletier to the Carolina Hurricanes for Keith Primeau and the Hurricanes' fifth-round pick, 148th overall, on January 23, 2000. They also traded their fifth-round pick, 165th overall, and Dave Babych to the Los Angeles Kings for Steve Duchesne on March 23, 1999, and their ninth-round pick, 291st overall, to the Chicago Blackhawks for Mark Janssens on June 12, 2000.

Round	Pick	Player	Position	Nationality	Team (league)	Notes
1	28	Justin Williams	Right wing	Canada	Plymouth Whalers (OHL)	
3	94	Alexander Drozdetsky	Right wing	Russia	SKA Saint Petersburg (RUS)	
6	171	Roman Cechmanek	Goaltender	Czech Republic	HC Vsetin (CZE)	(Note: The Flyers traded their fourth-round pick, 126th overall, to the Tampa Bay Lightning for the Lightning's sixth, seventh, and ninth-round picks on June 25, 2000.)
6	195	Colin Shields	Forward	United Kingdom	Cleveland Jr. Barons (NAHL)	
7	210	John Eichelberger	Forward	United States	Green Bay Gamblers (USHL)	
7	227	Guillaume Lefebvre	Left wing	Canada	Rouyn-Noranda Huskies (QMJHL)	
8	259	Regan Kelly	Defense	Canada	Nipawin Hawks (SJHL)	
9	287	Milan Kopecky	Forward	Czech Republic	Slavia Prague Jr. (CZE)	

== Farm teams ==
The Flyers were affiliated with the Philadelphia Phantoms of the AHL and the Trenton Titans of the ECHL.
