= Petr Svoboda (disambiguation) =

Petr Svoboda is a Czech ice hockey player.

Other people with this name include:

- Petr Svoboda (ice hockey, born 1980), Czech ice hockey player
- Petr Svoboda (hurdler) (born 1984), Czech track and field athlete
