= 2000–01 Boston Bruins season =

NHL team season

2000–01 Boston Bruins
- Division: 4th Northeast
- Conference: 9th Eastern
- 2000–01 record: 36–30–8–8
- Home record: 21–12–5–3
- Road record: 15–18–3–5
- Goals for: 227
- Goals against: 249

Team information
- General manager: Harry Sinden; Mike O'Connell
- Coach: Pat Burns (Oct.); Mike Keenan (Oct.–Apr.)
- Captain: Vacant (Oct.–Nov.); Jason Allison (Nov.–Apr.)
- Arena: Fleet Center
- Average attendance: 15,432 (87.9%)
- Minor league affiliate: Providence Bruins

Team leaders
- Goals: Joe Thornton (37)
- Assists: Jason Allison (59)
- Points: Jason Allison (95)
- Penalty minutes: Andrei Nazarov (200)
- Plus/minus: Brian Rolston (+6); Sergei Samsonov (+6)
- Wins: Byron Dafoe (22)
- Goals against average: Byron Dafoe (2.39)

The 2000–01 Boston Bruins season was the club's 77th season of operation in the National Hockey League (NHL). The team finished ninth in the Eastern Conference that year, failing to qualify for the Stanley Cup playoffs for the second consecutive year, which was also the first time the team missed out on the playoffs in consecutive years since the 1965–66 season and 1966–67 season. It was also the first full season the Bruins were without longtime team captain Ray Bourque since the 1979–80 season, who would win the Stanley Cup as a member of the Colorado Avalanche at season's end and subsequently retire from the NHL.

The Bruins tied the Carolina Hurricanes in points for the regular season at 88. However, Carolina had two more wins than the Bruins, leaving the Bruins in the ninth position in the conference, narrowly missing the playoffs. Boston was without starting goaltender Byron Dafoe for much of the season, and the Bruins had to use five goaltenders throughout the season. The good news is that the Bruins saw some of their young core mature further, as Joe Thornton set a then-career high in goals with 37, and Jason Allison once again broke the 30-goal plateau.

== Regular season ==
Head coach Pat Burns was fired on October 25 and replaced by Mike Keenan.

Jason Allison was named Ray Bourque’s replacement as team captain on November 8.

=== Final standings ===
Northeast Division
No.	CR		GP	W	L	T	OTL	GF	GA	Pts
1	2	**Ottawa Senators**	82	48	21	9	4	274	205	109
2	5	**Buffalo Sabres**	82	46	30	5	1	218	184	98
3	7	**Toronto Maple Leafs**	82	37	29	11	5	232	207	90
4	9	Boston Bruins	82	36	30	8	8	227	249	88
5	11	Montreal Canadiens	82	28	40	8	6	206	232	70

Note: CR = Conference rank; GP = Games played; W = Wins; L = Losses; T = Ties; OTL=Overtime loss; GF = Goals for; GA = Goals against; Pts = Points
Bolded teams qualified for the playoffs.

Eastern Conference
R		Div	GP	W	L	T	OTL	GF	GA	Pts
**1**	**Z-** New Jersey Devils	**AT**	**82**	**48**	**19**	**12**	**3**	**295**	**195**	111
**2**	**Y-** Ottawa Senators	**NE**	**82**	**48**	**21**	**9**	**4**	**274**	**205**	109
**3**	**Y-** Washington Capitals	**SE**	**82**	**41**	**27**	**10**	**4**	**233**	**211**	96
**4**	**X-** Philadelphia Flyers	**AT**	**82**	**43**	**25**	**11**	**3**	**240**	**207**	100
**5**	**X-** Buffalo Sabres	**NE**	**82**	**46**	**30**	**5**	**1**	**218**	**184**	98
**6**	**X-** Pittsburgh Penguins	**AT**	**82**	**42**	**28**	**9**	**3**	**281**	**256**	96
**7**	**X-** Toronto Maple Leafs	**NE**	**82**	**37**	**29**	**11**	**5**	**232**	**207**	90
**8**	**X-** Carolina Hurricanes	**SE**	**82**	**38**	**32**	**9**	**3**	**212**	**225**	88
8.5
9	Boston Bruins	NE	82	36	30	8	8	227	249	88
10	New York Rangers	AT	82	33	43	5	1	250	290	72
11	Montreal Canadiens	NE	82	28	40	8	6	206	232	70
12	Florida Panthers	SE	82	22	38	13	9	200	246	66
13	Atlanta Thrashers	SE	82	23	45	12	2	211	289	60
14	Tampa Bay Lightning	SE	82	24	47	6	5	201	280	59
15	New York Islanders	AT	82	21	51	7	3	185	268	52

Divisions: AT – Atlantic, NE – Northeast, SE – Southeast

Z – Clinched conference; Y – Clinched division; X – Clinched playoff spot

== Schedule and results ==
2000–01 regular season
October: 4–6–1–1 (home: 2–0–1–1; road: 2–6–0–0)

Game	Date	Score	Opponent	Record	Recap
1	October 5, 2000	4–4 OT	Ottawa Senators (2000–01)	0–0–1–0	T
2	October 7, 2000	5–1	@ Philadelphia Flyers (2000–01)	1–0–1–0	W
3	October 9, 2000	4–2	Florida Panthers (2000–01)	2–0–1–0	W
4	October 11, 2000	3–2 OT	@ Mighty Ducks of Anaheim (2000–01)	3–0–1–0	W
5	October 13, 2000	0–5	@ Los Angeles Kings (2000–01)	3–1–1–0	L
6	October 14, 2000	2–5	@ San Jose Sharks (2000–01)	3–2–1–0	L
7	October 17, 2000	1–6	@ Edmonton Oilers (2000–01)	3–3–1–0	L
8	October 20, 2000	2–3	@ Calgary Flames (2000–01)	3–4–1–0	L
9	October 26, 2000	4–1	Washington Capitals (2000–01)	4–4–1–0	W
10	October 28, 2000	1–2 OT	Toronto Maple Leafs (2000–01)	4–4–1–1	OTL
11	October 29, 2000	1–5	@ New York Rangers (2000–01)	4–5–1–1	L
12	October 31, 2000	2–4	@ New York Islanders (2000–01)	4–6–1–1	L

November: 4–5–2–1 (home: 3–3–2–1; road: 1–2–0–0)

Game	Date	Score	Opponent	Record	Recap
13	November 2, 2000	5–4	Chicago Blackhawks (2000–01)	5–6–1–1	W
14	November 4, 2000	3–8	Atlanta Thrashers (2000–01)	5–7–1–1	L
15	November 5, 2000	1–7	@ Toronto Maple Leafs (2000–01)	5–8–1–1	L
16	November 9, 2000	2–1	Ottawa Senators (2000–01)	6–8–1–1	W
17	November 11, 2000	2–2 OT	Nashville Predators (2000–01)	6–8–2–1	T
18	November 16, 2000	2–3 OT	New Jersey Devils (2000–01)	6–8–2–2	OTL
19	November 18, 2000	1–6	Minnesota Wild (2000–01)	6–9–2–2	L
20	November 21, 2000	1–2	@ Ottawa Senators (2000–01)	6–10–2–2	L
21	November 22, 2000	5–4	@ Detroit Red Wings (2000–01)	7–10–2–2	W
22	November 24, 2000	1–3	Carolina Hurricanes (2000–01)	7–11–2–2	L
23	November 26, 2000	4–4 OT	Los Angeles Kings (2000–01)	7–11–3–2	T
24	November 28, 2000	3–1	Pittsburgh Penguins (2000–01)	8–11–3–2	W

December: 5–5–2–2 (home: 3–2–1–1; road: 2–3–1–1)

Game	Date	Score	Opponent	Record	Recap
25	December 1, 2000	2–3	@ Washington Capitals (2000–01)	8–12–3–2	L
26	December 2, 2000	0–2	Washington Capitals (2000–01)	8–13–3–2	L
27	December 4, 2000	4–5	@ Atlanta Thrashers (2000–01)	8–14–3–2	L
28	December 6, 2000	3–2	@ Pittsburgh Penguins (2000–01)	9–14–3–2	W
29	December 8, 2000	2–3 OT	@ Columbus Blue Jackets (2000–01)	9–14–3–3	OTL
30	December 9, 2000	6–4	New York Rangers (2000–01)	10–14–3–3	W
31	December 12, 2000	0–3	Buffalo Sabres (2000–01)	10–15–3–3	L
32	December 16, 2000	4–1	Carolina Hurricanes (2000–01)	11–15–3–3	W
33	December 19, 2000	4–4 OT	Philadelphia Flyers (2000–01)	11–15–4–3	T
34	December 21, 2000	4–0	Toronto Maple Leafs (2000–01)	12–15–4–3	W
35	December 23, 2000	1–2 OT	Detroit Red Wings (2000–01)	12–15–4–4	OTL
36	December 27, 2000	5–2	@ New York Islanders (2000–01)	13–15–4–4	W
37	December 29, 2000	0–3	@ Florida Panthers (2000–01)	13–16–4–4	L
38	December 30, 2000	1–1 OT	@ Tampa Bay Lightning (2000–01)	13–16–5–4	T

January: 9–3–1–1 (home: 4–2–0–0; road: 5–1–1–1)

Game	Date	Score	Opponent	Record	Recap
39	January 1, 2001	4–3	@ Buffalo Sabres (2000–01)	14–16–5–4	W
40	January 5, 2001	1–1 OT	@ Washington Capitals (2000–01)	14–16–6–4	T
41	January 6, 2001	0–4	Dallas Stars (2000–01)	14–17–6–4	L
42	January 9, 2001	5–2	Pittsburgh Penguins (2000–01)	15–17–6–4	W
43	January 10, 2001	2–1	@ Montreal Canadiens (2000–01)	16–17–6–4	W
44	January 13, 2001	4–1	New York Rangers (2000–01)	17–17–6–4	W
45	January 16, 2001	5–4	@ New Jersey Devils (2000–01)	18–17–6–4	W
46	January 18, 2001	2–4	@ Carolina Hurricanes (2000–01)	18–18–6–4	L
47	January 19, 2001	0–1 OT	@ Nashville Predators (2000–01)	18–18–6–5	OTL
48	January 22, 2001	2–3	Florida Panthers (2000–01)	18–19–6–5	L
49	January 24, 2001	2–1	@ Toronto Maple Leafs (2000–01)	19–19–6–5	W
50	January 26, 2001	2–1	@ Buffalo Sabres (2000–01)	20–19–6–5	W
51	January 27, 2001	4–3 OT	New Jersey Devils (2000–01)	21–19–6–5	W
52	January 30, 2001	5–1	St. Louis Blues (2000–01)	22–19–6–5	W

February: 4–5–0–2 (home: 3–1–0–0; road: 1–4–0–2)

Game	Date	Score	Opponent	Record	Recap
53	February 1, 2001	0–3	Montreal Canadiens (2000–01)	22–20–6–5	L
54	February 6, 2001	4–3	Philadelphia Flyers (2000–01)	23–20–6–5	W
55	February 9, 2001	1–5	@ Atlanta Thrashers (2000–01)	23–21–6–5	L
56	February 10, 2001	6–2	Tampa Bay Lightning (2000–01)	24–21–6–5	W
57	February 15, 2001	6–3	@ Tampa Bay Lightning (2000–01)	25–21–6–5	W
58	February 16, 2001	1–2	@ Florida Panthers (2000–01)	25–22–6–5	L
59	February 18, 2001	4–5	@ Carolina Hurricanes (2000–01)	25–23–6–5	L
60	February 21, 2001	2–8	@ Colorado Avalanche (2000–01)	25–24–6–5	L
61	February 23, 2001	4–5 OT	@ Dallas Stars (2000–01)	25–24–6–6	OTL
62	February 24, 2001	2–3 OT	@ St. Louis Blues (2000–01)	25–24–6–7	OTL
63	February 27, 2001	7–4	Phoenix Coyotes (2000–01)	26–24–6–7	W

March: 7–5–2–1 (home: 4–4–1–0; road: 3–1–1–1)

Game	Date	Score	Opponent	Record	Recap
64	March 1, 2001	3–1	Tampa Bay Lightning (2000–01)	27–24–6–7	W
65	March 3, 2001	3–2	San Jose Sharks (2000–01)	28–24–6–7	W
66	March 5, 2001	4–6	@ Philadelphia Flyers (2000–01)	28–25–6–7	L
67	March 6, 2001	1–3	Buffalo Sabres (2000–01)	28–26–6–7	L
68	March 8, 2001	3–5	Ottawa Senators (2000–01)	28–27–6–7	L
69	March 10, 2001	5–7	Atlanta Thrashers (2000–01)	28–28–6–7	L
70	March 15, 2001	2–2 OT	Vancouver Canucks (2000–01)	28–28–7–7	T
71	March 17, 2001	3–2	@ Montreal Canadiens (2000–01)	29–28–7–7	W
72	March 20, 2001	2–2 OT	@ Pittsburgh Penguins (2000–01)	29–28–8–7	T
73	March 22, 2001	3–2 OT	Montreal Canadiens (2000–01)	30–28–8–7	W
74	March 24, 2001	2–4	Colorado Avalanche (2000–01)	30–29–8–7	L
75	March 25, 2001	3–2	@ New York Rangers (2000–01)	31–29–8–7	W
76	March 28, 2001	3–0	@ Toronto Maple Leafs (2000–01)	32–29–8–7	W
77	March 30, 2001	4–5 OT	@ Ottawa Senators (2000–01)	32–29–8–8	OTL
78	March 31, 2001	4–2	New York Islanders (2000–01)	33–29–8–8	W

April: 3–1–0–0 (home: 2–0–0–0; road: 1–1–0–0)

Game	Date	Score	Opponent	Record	Recap
79	April 2, 2001	3–2 OT	Montreal Canadiens (2000–01)	34–29–8–8	W
80	April 4, 2001	3–2	@ Buffalo Sabres (2000–01)	35–29–8–8	W
81	April 6, 2001	2–5	@ New Jersey Devils (2000–01)	35–30–8–8	L
82	April 7, 2001	4–2	New York Islanders (2000–01)	36–30–8–8	W

Legend: W Win (2 points) L Loss (0 points) T Tie (1 point) OTL Overtime loss (1 point)

== Player statistics ==
=== Scoring ===
- Position abbreviations: C = Center; D = Defense; G = Goaltender; LW = Left wing; RW = Right wing
- † = Joined team via a transaction (e.g., trade, waivers, signing) during the season. Stats reflect time with the Bruins only.
- ‡ = Left team via a transaction (e.g., trade, waivers, release) during the season. Stats reflect time with the Bruins only.

No.	Player	Pos	Regular season					
No.	Player	Pos	GP	G	A	Pts	+/-	PIM
41	Jason Allison	C	82	36	59	95	−8	85
14	Sergei Samsonov	LW	82	29	46	75	6	18
19	Joe Thornton	C	72	37	34	71	−4	107
13	Bill Guerin†	RW	64	28	35	63	−4	122
12	Brian Rolston	LW	77	19	39	58	6	28
51	Andrei Kovalenko	RW	76	16	21	37	−14	27
22	Mikko Eloranta	LW	62	12	11	23	2	38
11	P. J. Axelsson	LW	81	8	15	23	−12	27
26	Mike Knuble	RW	82	7	13	20	0	37
29	Dixon Ward†	RW	63	5	13	18	−1	65
18	Kyle McLaren	D	58	5	12	17	−5	53
55	Jonathan Girard	D	31	3	13	16	2	14
20	Darren Van Impe	D	31	3	10	13	−9	41
32	Don Sweeney	D	72	2	10	12	−1	26
25	Hal Gill	D	80	1	10	11	−2	71
64	Jarno Kultanen	D	62	2	8	10	−3	26
63	Patrick Traverse†‡	D	37	2	6	8	4	14
23	Peter Popovic	D	60	1	6	7	−5	48
27	Eric Weinrich†	D	22	1	5	6	−8	10
17	Shawn Bates	C	45	2	3	5	−12	26
62 (Note: Nazarov wore number 45 in his first seven games after being acquired.)	Andrei Nazarov†	LW	63	1	4	5	−14	200
16	Ken Belanger	LW	40	2	2	4	−6	121
10	Cameron Mann	RW	15	1	3	4	0	6
74	Paul Coffey‡	D	18	0	4	4	−6	30
37	Lee Goren	RW	21	2	0	2	−3	7
27	Samuel Pahlsson‡	C	17	1	1	2	−5	6
34	Byron Dafoe	G	45	0	2	2		6
39	Zdenek Kutlak	D	10	0	2	2	−3	4
53	Brandon Smith	D	3	1	0	1	−1	0
57	Eric Manlow	C	8	0	1	1	0	2
44	Nick Boynton	D	1	0	0	0	−1	0
47	John Grahame	G	10	0	0	0		2
38	Jay Henderson	LW	13	0	0	0	−1	26
48	Joe Hulbig	LW	7	0	0	0	−3	4
72	Pavel Kolarik	D	10	0	0	0	−2	4
61	Marquis Mathieu	C	1	0	0	0	0	2
21	Eric Nickulas	RW	7	0	0	0	−2	4
1	Andrew Raycroft	G	15	0	0	0		0
28	Andre Savage	C	1	0	0	0	0	0
35	Peter Skudra†	G	25	0	0	0		0
31	Kay Whitmore	G	5	0	0	0		0

=== Goaltending ===
- † = Joined team via a transaction (e.g., trade, waivers, signing) during the season. Stats reflect time with the Bruins only.

No.	Player	Regular season									
No.	Player	GP	W	L	T	SA	GA	GAA	SV%	SO	TOI
34	Byron Dafoe	45	22	14	7	1076	101	2.39	.906	2	2536
35	Peter Skudra†	25	6	12	1	511	62	3.33	.879	0	1116
1	Andrew Raycroft	15	4	6	0	291	32	2.96	.890	0	649
47	John Grahame	10	3	4	0	211	28	3.57	.867	0	471
31	Kay Whitmore	5	1	2	0	94	18	5.32	.809	0	203

== Awards and records ==
=== Awards ===
Type	Award/honor	Recipient	Ref
League (in-season)	NHL All-Star Game selection	Jason Allison	
League (in-season)	NHL All-Star Game selection	Bill Guerin	
League (in-season)	NHL All-Star Game selection	Sergei Samsonov (Note: Samsonov was an injury replacement for Jaromir Jagr of the Pittsburgh Penguins.)	
Team	Elizabeth C. Dufresne Trophy	Jason Allison	
Team	John P. Bucyk Award	Don Sweeney	
Team	Seventh Player Award	Bill Guerin	
Team	Three Stars Awards	Jason Allison (1st)	
Team	Three Stars Awards	Bill Guerin (2nd)	
Team	Three Stars Awards	Joe Thornton (3rd)	

=== Milestones ===
Milestone	Player	Date	Ref
First game	Jarno Kultanen	October 5, 2000	
First game	Samuel Pahlsson	October 5, 2000	
First game	Andrew Raycroft	October 7, 2000	
First game	Zdenek Kutlak	November 5, 2000	
First game	Pavel Kolarik	November 9, 2000	
First game	Lee Goren	December 2, 2000	
First game	Eric Manlow	December 19, 2000	

== Transactions ==
The Bruins were involved in the following transactions from June 11, 2000, the day after the deciding game of the 2000 Stanley Cup Final, through June 9, 2001, the day of the deciding game of the 2001 Stanley Cup Final.

=== Trades ===
Date	Details		Ref
June 23, 2000	To Boston Bruins: Future considerations (Note: Columbus received the pick for agreeing to select Steve Heinze in the expansion draft.)	To Columbus Blue Jackets: 5th-round pick in 2001	
June 25, 2000	To Boston Bruins: 9th-round pick in 2000	To Edmonton Oilers: 9th-round pick in 2001	
July 20, 2000	To Boston Bruins: Kay Whitmore	To Edmonton Oilers: Future considerations	
November 15, 2000	To Boston Bruins: Bill Guerin	To Edmonton Oilers: Rights to Anson Carter; Option to switch 1st-round picks in 2001 or 2002; 2nd-round pick in 2001; Future considerations	
November 18, 2000	To Boston Bruins: Andrei Nazarov; Patrick Traverse	To Anaheim Mighty Ducks: Samuel Pahlsson	
December 5, 2000	To Boston Bruins: Future considerations	To New York Islanders: Sean Pronger	
February 13, 2001	To Boston Bruins: 9th-round pick in 2001	To Philadelphia Flyers: Rights to Matt Zultek	
February 21, 2001	To Boston Bruins: Eric Weinrich	To Montreal Canadiens: Patrick Traverse	

=== Players acquired ===
Date	Player	Former team	Term	Via	Ref
July 2, 2000	Peter Popovic	Pittsburgh Penguins	1-year (Note: Option for a second year.)	Free agency	
July 11, 2000	Eric Manlow	Providence Bruins (AHL)	2-year	Free agency	
July 13, 2000	Paul Coffey	Carolina Hurricanes	2-year	Free agency	
July 25, 2000	Andrei Kovalenko	Carolina Hurricanes	1-year	Free agency	
October 3, 2000	Peter Skudra	Pittsburgh Penguins	1-year	Free agency	
November 3, 2000	Dixon Ward	Buffalo Sabres	1-year	Free agency	
November 14, 2000	Peter Skudra	Buffalo Sabres		Waivers	

=== Players lost ===
Date	Player	New team	Via (Note: In parentheses is the player's free agency group on July 1 if applicable.)	Ref
June 23, 2000	Steve Heinze	Columbus Blue Jackets	Expansion draft	
June 23, 2000	Mattias Timander	Columbus Blue Jackets	Expansion draft	
July 7, 2000	Landon Wilson	Phoenix Coyotes	Free agency	
July 20, 2000	Antti Laaksonen	Minnesota Wild	Free agency (VI)	
July 20, 2000	Mike Matteucci	Minnesota Wild	Free agency (UFA)	
July 31, 2000	Rob Tallas	Chicago Blackhawks	Free agency (UFA)	
August 14, 2000	Aaron Downey	Chicago Blackhawks	Free agency (VI)	
August 29, 2000	Joel Prpic	Colorado Avalanche	Free agency (VI)	
October 6, 2000	Peter Skudra	Buffalo Sabres	Waivers	
December 15, 2000	Paul Coffey		Buyout	
February 10, 2001	Marty McSorley	Grand Rapids Griffins (IHL)	Free agency (III)	

=== Signings ===
Date	Player	Term	Contract type	Ref
June 27, 2000	Lee Goren	2-year	Entry-level	
July 3, 2000	Don Sweeney	3-year	Re-signing	
July 11, 2000	Pavel Kolarik	1-year	Entry-level	
July 11, 2000	Jarno Kultanen	1-year	Entry-level	
July 20, 2000	Mattias Karlin	3-year	Entry-level	
July 20, 2000	Zdenek Kutlak	3-year	Entry-level	
August 2, 2000	Elias Abrahamsson	1-year	Re-signing	
August 2, 2000	Shawn Bates	1-year	Re-signing	
August 2, 2000	Mikko Eloranta	1-year	Re-signing	
August 2, 2000	Cameron Mann	1-year	Re-signing	
August 2, 2000	Eric Nickulas	1-year	Re-signing	
August 2, 2000	Andre Savage	1-year	Re-signing	
August 3, 2000	John Grahame	2-year	Re-signing	
August 25, 2000	Joe Hulbig	1-year	Re-signing	
September 26, 2000	Sergei Samsonov	3-year	Re-signing	
September 26, 2000	Joe Thornton	3-year	Re-signing	
October 3, 2000	Ivan Huml	3-year	Entry-level	

== Draft picks ==
Boston's draft picks at the 2000 NHL entry draft held at the Pengrowth Saddledome in Calgary, Alberta.

Round	#	Player	Nationality	College/Junior/Club team (League)
1	7	Lars Jonsson	Sweden	Leksands IF Jr. (Sweden)
1	27	Martin Samuelsson	Sweden	Modo Hockey Jr. (Sweden)
2	37	Andy Hilbert	United States	University of Michigan (CCHA)
2	59	Ivan Huml	Czech Republic	Langley Chiefs (BCHL)
3	66	Tuukka Makela	Finland	HIFK (Finland)
3	73	Sergei Zinovjev	Russia	Metallurg Novokuznetsk (Russia)
4	103	Brett Nowak	United States	Harvard University (ECAC)
6	174	Jarno Kultanen	Finland	HIFK (Finland)
7	204	Chris Berti	Canada	Sarnia Sting (OHL)
8	237	Zdenek Kultak	Czech Republic	HC České Budějovice (Czech Republic)
9	268	Pavel Kolarik	Czech Republic	Slavia Prague (Czech Republic)
9	279	Andreas Lindstrom	Sweden	Luleå HF (Sweden)

== See also ==
- 2000–01 NHL season
