= 2000–01 Washington Capitals season =

NHL hockey team season

2000–01 Washington Capitals
- Southeast Division champions
- Division: 1st Southeast
- Conference: 3rd Eastern
- 2000–01 record: 41–27–10–4
- Home record: 24–9–6–2
- Road record: 17–18–4–2
- Goals for: 233
- Goals against: 211

Team information
- General manager: George McPhee
- Coach: Ron Wilson
- Captain: Adam Oates
- Arena: MCI Center
- Average attendance: 15,534
- Minor league affiliates: Portland Pirates; Richmond Renegades; Quad City Mallards

Team leaders
- Goals: Peter Bondra (45)
- Assists: Adam Oates (69)
- Points: Adam Oates (82)
- Penalty minutes: Chris Simon (109)
- Plus/minus: Joe Reekie (+14)
- Wins: Olaf Kolzig (37)
- Goals against average: Craig Billington (2.45)

The 2000–01 Washington Capitals season was the Washington Capitals 27th season in the National Hockey League (NHL).

== Regular season ==
=== Final standings ===
Southeast Division
No.	CR		GP	W	L	T	OTL	GF	GA	Pts
1	3	**Washington Capitals**	82	41	27	10	4	233	211	96
2	8	**Carolina Hurricanes**	82	38	32	9	3	212	225	88
3	12	Florida Panthers	82	22	38	13	9	200	246	66
4	13	Atlanta Thrashers	82	23	45	12	2	211	289	60
5	14	Tampa Bay Lightning	82	24	47	6	5	201	280	59

Note: CR = Conference rank; GP = Games played; W = Wins; L = Losses; T = Ties; OTL = Overtime loss; GF = Goals for; GA = Goals against; Pts = Points
Bolded teams qualified for the playoffs.

Eastern Conference
R		Div	GP	W	L	T	OTL	GF	GA	Pts
**1**	**Z-** New Jersey Devils	**AT**	**82**	**48**	**19**	**12**	**3**	**295**	**195**	111
**2**	**Y-** Ottawa Senators	**NE**	**82**	**48**	**21**	**9**	**4**	**274**	**205**	109
**3**	**Y-** Washington Capitals	**SE**	**82**	**41**	**27**	**10**	**4**	**233**	**211**	96
**4**	**X-** Philadelphia Flyers	**AT**	**82**	**43**	**25**	**11**	**3**	**240**	**207**	100
**5**	**X-** Buffalo Sabres	**NE**	**82**	**46**	**30**	**5**	**1**	**218**	**184**	98
**6**	**X-** Pittsburgh Penguins	**AT**	**82**	**42**	**28**	**9**	**3**	**281**	**256**	96
**7**	**X-** Toronto Maple Leafs	**NE**	**82**	**37**	**29**	**11**	**5**	**232**	**207**	90
**8**	**X-** Carolina Hurricanes	**SE**	**82**	**38**	**32**	**9**	**3**	**212**	**225**	88
8.5
9	Boston Bruins	NE	82	36	30	8	8	227	249	88
10	New York Rangers	AT	82	33	43	5	1	250	290	72
11	Montreal Canadiens	NE	82	28	40	8	6	206	232	70
12	Florida Panthers	SE	82	22	38	13	9	200	246	66
13	Atlanta Thrashers	SE	82	23	45	12	2	211	289	60
14	Tampa Bay Lightning	SE	82	24	47	6	5	201	280	59
15	New York Islanders	AT	82	21	51	7	3	185	268	52

Divisions: AT – Atlantic, NE – Northeast, SE – Southeast

Z – Clinched conference; Y – Clinched division; X – Clinched playoff spot

== Schedule and results ==
=== Regular season ===
2000–01 regular season
October: 2–5–4–1 (home: 2–1–1–1; road: 0–4–3–0)

Game	Date	Score	Opponent	Record	Recap
1	October 6, 2000	1–4	Los Angeles Kings (2000–01)	0–1–0–0	L
2	October 7, 2000	3–3 OT	@ Carolina Hurricanes (2000–01)	0–1–1–0	T
3	October 11, 2000	3–3 OT	@ Atlanta Thrashers (2000–01)	0–1–2–0	T
4	October 13, 2000	1–3	@ Nashville Predators (2000–01)	0–2–2–0	L
5	October 14, 2000	0–3	@ Dallas Stars (2000–01)	0–3–2–0	L
6	October 17, 2000	3–4 OT	Colorado Avalanche (2000–01)	0–3–2–1	OTL
7	October 19, 2000	5–2	New Jersey Devils (2000–01)	1–3–2–1	W
8	October 21, 2000	4–4 OT	New York Islanders (2000–01)	1–3–3–1	T
9	October 26, 2000	1–4	@ Boston Bruins (2000–01)	1–4–3–1	L
10	October 27, 2000	1–3	@ Columbus Blue Jackets (2000–01)	1–5–3–1	L
11	October 29, 2000	1–1 OT	@ Philadelphia Flyers (2000–01)	1–5–4–1	T
12	October 31, 2000	6–2	Detroit Red Wings (2000–01)	2–5–4–1	W

November: 5–5–2–0 (home: 4–1–2–0; road: 1–4–0–0)

Game	Date	Score	Opponent	Record	Recap
13	November 2, 2000	0–2	@ St. Louis Blues (2000–01)	2–6–4–1	L
14	November 4, 2000	3–2	@ Florida Panthers (2000–01)	3–6–4–1	W
15	November 5, 2000	2–5	@ Tampa Bay Lightning (2000–01)	3–7–4–1	L
16	November 9, 2000	3–5	New York Rangers (2000–01)	3–8–4–1	L
17	November 12, 2000	2–2 OT	Atlanta Thrashers (2000–01)	3–8–5–1	T
18	November 14, 2000	2–2 OT	Phoenix Coyotes (2000–01)	3–8–6–1	T
19	November 17, 2000	4–3	Montreal Canadiens (2000–01)	4–8–6–1	W
20	November 18, 2000	3–5	@ Philadelphia Flyers (2000–01)	4–9–6–1	L
21	November 22, 2000	3–2 OT	Vancouver Canucks (2000–01)	5–9–6–1	W
22	November 24, 2000	1–0	New York Islanders (2000–01)	6–9–6–1	W
23	November 25, 2000	1–2	@ Atlanta Thrashers (2000–01)	6–10–6–1	L
24	November 29, 2000	4–1	Tampa Bay Lightning (2000–01)	7–10–6–1	W

December: 10–3–1–0 (home: 5–1–1–0; road: 5–2–0–0)

Game	Date	Score	Opponent	Record	Recap
25	December 1, 2000	3–2	Boston Bruins (2000–01)	8–10–6–1	W
26	December 2, 2000	2–0	@ Boston Bruins (2000–01)	9–10–6–1	W
27	December 6, 2000	2–3	@ New York Rangers (2000–01)	9–11–6–1	L
28	December 9, 2000	3–2	@ New Jersey Devils (2000–01)	10–11–6–1	W
29	December 12, 2000	3–2	@ New York Islanders (2000–01)	11–11–6–1	W
30	December 14, 2000	2–1	Minnesota Wild (2000–01)	12–11–6–1	W
31	December 16, 2000	4–0	Edmonton Oilers (2000–01)	13–11–6–1	W
32	December 18, 2000	3–5	San Jose Sharks (2000–01)	13–12–6–1	L
33	December 20, 2000	2–2 OT	Buffalo Sabres (2000–01)	13–12–7–1	T
34	December 21, 2000	3–1	@ Buffalo Sabres (2000–01)	14–12–7–1	W
35	December 23, 2000	5–3	Florida Panthers (2000–01)	15–12–7–1	W
36	December 27, 2000	5–1	@ Ottawa Senators (2000–01)	16–12–7–1	W
37	December 29, 2000	2–4	@ New Jersey Devils (2000–01)	16–13–7–1	L
38	December 30, 2000	6–3	Philadelphia Flyers (2000–01)	17–13–7–1	W

January: 6–6–2–0 (home: 4–1–2–0; road: 2–5–0–0)

Game	Date	Score	Opponent	Record	Recap
39	January 1, 2001	4–2	Atlanta Thrashers (2000–01)	18–13–7–1	W
40	January 3, 2001	2–3	@ Pittsburgh Penguins (2000–01)	18–14–7–1	L
41	January 5, 2001	1–1 OT	Boston Bruins (2000–01)	18–14–8–1	T
42	January 6, 2001	3–2	@ Toronto Maple Leafs (2000–01)	19–14–8–1	W
43	January 8, 2001	3–5	Pittsburgh Penguins (2000–01)	19–15–8–1	L
44	January 10, 2001	0–3	@ Minnesota Wild (2000–01)	19–16–8–1	L
45	January 13, 2001	4–1	Atlanta Thrashers (2000–01)	20–16–8–1	W
46	January 18, 2001	4–5	@ Ottawa Senators (2000–01)	20–17–8–1	L
47	January 19, 2001	1–3	@ Chicago Blackhawks (2000–01)	20–18–8–1	L
48	January 23, 2001	5–2	@ Tampa Bay Lightning (2000–01)	21–18–8–1	W
49	January 24, 2001	2–1	Florida Panthers (2000–01)	22–18–8–1	W
50	January 27, 2001	2–4	@ Montreal Canadiens (2000–01)	22–19–8–1	L
51	January 28, 2001	4–2	Philadelphia Flyers (2000–01)	23–19–8–1	W
52	January 30, 2001	1–1 OT	Ottawa Senators (2000–01)	23–19–9–1	T

February: 9–1–1–0 (home: 3–1–0–0; road: 6–0–1–0)

Game	Date	Score	Opponent	Record	Recap
53	February 1, 2001	5–4	Toronto Maple Leafs (2000–01)	24–19–9–1	W
54	February 7, 2001	3–1	@ Colorado Avalanche (2000–01)	25–19–9–1	W
55	February 9, 2001	4–3	@ Mighty Ducks of Anaheim (2000–01)	26–19–9–1	W
56	February 10, 2001	4–3	@ Los Angeles Kings (2000–01)	27–19–9–1	W
57	February 13, 2001	4–4 OT	@ Calgary Flames (2000–01)	27–19–10–1	T
58	February 14, 2001	4–3 OT	@ Vancouver Canucks (2000–01)	28–19–10–1	W
59	February 17, 2001	6–3	@ Montreal Canadiens (2000–01)	29–19–10–1	W
60	February 21, 2001	2–1	Nashville Predators (2000–01)	30–19–10–1	W
61	February 23, 2001	3–1	Montreal Canadiens (2000–01)	31–19–10–1	W
62	February 24, 2001	2–1	@ Carolina Hurricanes (2000–01)	32–19–10–1	W
63	February 27, 2001	2–3	Chicago Blackhawks (2000–01)	32–20–10–1	L

March: 7–5–0–2 (home: 4–3–0–1; road: 3–2–0–1)

Game	Date	Score	Opponent	Record	Recap
64	March 1, 2001	2–3 OT	Toronto Maple Leafs (2000–01)	32–20–10–2	OTL
65	March 3, 2001	4–3	Pittsburgh Penguins (2000–01)	33–20–10–2	W
66	March 6, 2001	5–1	@ New York Islanders (2000–01)	34–20–10–2	W
67	March 7, 2001	4–3	@ Pittsburgh Penguins (2000–01)	35–20–10–2	W
68	March 9, 2001	5–3	New York Rangers (2000–01)	36–20–10–2	W
69	March 11, 2001	6–5	Ottawa Senators (2000–01)	37–20–10–2	W
70	March 13, 2001	0–2	Mighty Ducks of Anaheim (2000–01)	37–21–10–2	L
71	March 15, 2001	0–3	Carolina Hurricanes (2000–01)	37–22–10–2	L
72	March 17, 2001	2–3	Buffalo Sabres (2000–01)	37–23–10–2	L
73	March 19, 2001	3–6	@ New York Rangers (2000–01)	37–24–10–2	L
74	March 23, 2001	1–4	@ Florida Panthers (2000–01)	37–25–10–2	L
75	March 24, 2001	3–2	@ Tampa Bay Lightning (2000–01)	38–25–10–2	W
76	March 28, 2001	7–0	Carolina Hurricanes (2000–01)	39–25–10–2	W
77	March 30, 2001	3–4 OT	@ Carolina Hurricanes (2000–01)	39–25–10–3	OTL

April: 2–2–0–1 (home: 2–1–0–0; road: 0–1–0–1)

Game	Date	Score	Opponent	Record	Recap
78	April 1, 2001	1–2 OT	@ Detroit Red Wings (2000–01)	39–25–10–4	OTL
79	April 3, 2001	4–6	New Jersey Devils (2000–01)	39–26–10–4	L
80	April 5, 2001	3–0	Florida Panthers (2000–01)	40–26–10–4	W
81	April 6, 2001	1–2	@ Buffalo Sabres (2000–01)	40–27–10–4	L
82	April 8, 2001	2–1	Tampa Bay Lightning (2000–01)	41–27–10–4	W

Legend: W Win (2 points) L Loss (0 points) T Tie (1 point) OTL Overtime loss (1 point)

=== Playoffs ===
2001 Stanley Cup playoffs
Eastern Conference Quarterfinals vs. (6) Pittsburgh Penguins – Penguins win 4–2

Game	Date	Score	Opponent	Series	Recap
1	April 12, 2001	1–0	Pittsburgh Penguins	Capitals lead 1–0	W
2	April 14, 2001	1–2	Pittsburgh Penguins	Series tied 1–1	L
3	April 16, 2001	0–3	@ Pittsburgh Penguins	Penguins lead 2–1	L
4	April 18, 2001	4–3 OT	@ Pittsburgh Penguins	Series tied 2–2	W
5	April 21, 2001	1–2	Pittsburgh Penguins	Penguins lead 3–2	L
6	April 23, 2001	3–4 OT	@ Pittsburgh Penguins	Penguins win 4–2	L

Legend: W Win L Loss

== Player statistics ==
=== Scoring ===
- Position abbreviations: C = Center; D = Defense; G = Goaltender; LW = Left wing; RW = Right wing
- † = Joined team via a transaction (e.g., trade, waivers, signing) during the season. Stats reflect time with the Capitals only.
- ‡ = Left team via a transaction (e.g., trade, waivers, release) during the season. Stats reflect time with the Capitals only.

No.	Player	Pos	Regular season						Playoffs					
No.	Player	Pos	GP	G	A	Pts	+/-	PIM	GP	G	A	Pts	+/-	PIM
77	Adam Oates	C	81	13	69	82	−9	28	6	0	0	0	−4	0
12	Peter Bondra	RW	82	45	36	81	8	60	6	2	0	2	−2	2
55	Sergei Gonchar	D	76	19	38	57	12	70	6	1	3	4	0	2
10	Ulf Dahlen	RW	73	15	33	48	11	6	6	0	1	1	−2	2
22	Steve Konowalchuk	LW	82	24	23	47	8	87	6	2	3	5	−1	14
11	Jeff Halpern	C	80	21	21	42	13	60	6	2	3	5	0	17
13	Andrei Nikolishin	C	81	13	25	38	9	34	6	0	0	0	−3	2
6	Calle Johansson	D	76	7	29	36	11	26	6	1	2	3	−4	2
44	Richard Zednik‡	RW	62	16	19	35	−2	61	—	—	—	—	—	—
8	Dmitri Khristich†	RW	43	10	19	29	−8	8	3	0	0	0	0	0
17	Chris Simon	LW	60	10	10	20	−12	109	6	0	1	1	−2	4
3	Sylvain Cote	D	68	7	11	18	−3	18	5	0	0	0	−1	2
38 (Note: Bulis wore number 8 in his first 14 games.)	Jan Bulis‡	C	39	5	13	18	0	26	—	—	—	—	—	—
14	Joe Sacco	RW	69	7	7	14	4	48	6	0	0	0	−1	2
29	Joe Reekie	D	74	2	9	11	14	77	4	0	0	0	−1	4
15	Dmitri Mironov	D	36	3	5	8	−7	6	—	—	—	—	—	—
19	Brendan Witt	D	72	3	3	6	2	101	6	2	0	2	−5	12
2	Ken Klee	D	54	2	4	6	−5	60	6	0	1	1	0	8
23	Trent Whitfield	C	61	2	4	6	3	35	5	0	0	0	0	2
21 (Note: Black wore number 28 in his first eight games.)	James Black	LW	42	1	5	6	−3	4	—	—	—	—	—	—
20	Glen Metropolit	C	15	1	5	6	−2	10	1	0	0	0	−1	0
9	Joe Murphy‡	RW	14	1	5	6	−5	20	—	—	—	—	—	—
26	Matt Herr‡	C	22	2	3	5	3	17	—	—	—	—	—	—
16	Trevor Linden†	RW	12	3	1	4	2	8	6	0	4	4	−3	14
24	Rob Zettler	D	29	0	4	4	0	55	6	0	0	0	−1	0
25	Terry Yake	C	12	0	3	3	0	8	—	—	—	—	—	—
9	Dainius Zubrus†	C	12	1	1	2	−4	7	6	0	0	0	1	2
37	Olaf Kolzig	G	72	0	2	2		14	6	0	0	0		0
27	Craig Berube‡	LW	22	0	1	1	−3	18	—	—	—	—	—	—
1	Craig Billington	G	12	0	1	1		0	—	—	—	—	—	—
16	Kris Beech	C	4	0	0	0	−2	2	—	—	—	—	—	—
34	Jakub Cutta	D	3	0	0	0	−1	0	—	—	—	—	—	—
30	Corey Hirsch†	G	1	0	0	0		0	—	—	—	—	—	—
28	Jason Marshall†	D	5	0	0	0	−1	17	—	—	—	—	—	—
74 (Note: Myhres wore number 18 in his first game.)	Brantt Myhres†	RW	5	0	0	0	0	29	—	—	—	—	—	—
28	Matt Pettinger	LW	10	0	0	0	−1	2	—	—	—	—	—	—

=== Goaltending ===
- † = Joined team via a transaction (e.g., trade, waivers, signing) during the season. Stats reflect time with the Capitals only.

No.	Player	Regular season										Playoffs								
No.	Player	GP	W	L	T	SA	GA	GAA	SV%	SO	TOI	GP	W	L	SA	GA	GAA	SV%	SO	TOI
37	Olaf Kolzig	72	37	26	8	1941	177	2.48	.909	5	4279	6	2	4	153	14	2.24	.908	1	375
1	Craig Billington	12	3	5	2	317	27	2.45	.915	0	660	—	—	—	—	—	—	—	—	—
30	Corey Hirsch†	1	0	0	0	8	0	0.00	1.000	0	20	—	—	—	—	—	—	—	—	—

== Awards and records ==
=== Awards ===
Type	Award/honor	Recipient	Ref
League (in-season)	NHL All-Star Game selection	Sergei Gonchar	
League (in-season)	NHL Player of the Week	Olaf Kolzig (December 18)	
League (in-season)	NHL Player of the Week	Adam Oates (December 27)	

=== Milestones ===
Milestone	Player	Date	Ref
First game	Kris Beech	October 6, 2000	
First game	Jakub Cutta	October 6, 2000	
First game	Matt Pettinger	November 24, 2000	
1,000th game played	Calle Johansson	March 19, 2001	

== Transactions ==
The Capitals were involved in the following transactions from June 11, 2000, the day after the deciding game of the 2000 Stanley Cup Final, through June 9, 2001, the day of the deciding game of the 2001 Stanley Cup Final.

=== Trades ===
Date	Details		Ref
June 24, 2000	To Washington Capitals: Anaheim's 2nd-round pick in 2000	To Calgary Flames: Miika Elomo; Buffalo's 4th-round pick in 2000	
June 25, 2000	To Washington Capitals: 5th-round pick in 2000	To Los Angeles Kings: Tampa Bay's 7th-round pick in 2000; Calgary's 7th-round pick in 2000	
June 25, 2000	To Washington Capitals: Toronto's 4th-round pick in 2000	To Chicago Blackhawks: Los Angeles' 5th-round pick in 2000; 6th-round pick in 2000	
June 25, 2000	To Washington Capitals: 8th-round pick in 2001	To San Jose Sharks: 8th-round pick in 2000	
July 21, 2000	To Washington Capitals: Remi Royer	To Chicago Blackhawks: Nolan Baumgartner	
November 29, 2000	To Washington Capitals: Derek Bekar	To St. Louis Blues: Mike Peluso	
December 11, 2000	To Washington Capitals: Dmitri Khristich	To Toronto Maple Leafs: 3rd-round pick in 2001	
January 11, 2001	To Washington Capitals: 9th-round pick in 2001	To New York Islanders: Craig Berube	
February 1, 2001	To Washington Capitals: Brantt Myhres	To Nashville Predators: Future considerations	
March 3, 2001	To Washington Capitals: David Emma	To Florida Panthers: Remi Royer	
March 13, 2001	To Washington Capitals: Trevor Linden; Dainius Zubrus; 2nd-round pick in 2001	To Montreal Canadiens: Jan Bulis; Richard Zednik; 1st-round pick in 2001	
March 13, 2001	To Washington Capitals: Jason Marshall	To Anaheim Mighty Ducks: Alexei Tezikov; 4th-round pick in 2001	
March 13, 2001	To Washington Capitals: Dean Melanson	To Philadelphia Flyers: Matt Herr	

=== Players acquired ===
Date	Player	Former team	Term	Via	Ref
July 6, 2000	Sylvain Cote	Dallas Stars	3-year	Free agency	
July 7, 2000	Craig Berube	Philadelphia Flyers	1-year	Free agency	
July 13, 2000	Mark Murphy	Philadelphia Phantoms (AHL)		Free agency	
July 13, 2000	Stefan Ustorf	Cincinnati Cyclones (IHL)		Free agency	
July 21, 2000	Todd Rohloff	Chicago Blackhawks		Free agency	
August 25, 2000	Stephane Richer	St. Louis Blues	1-year	Free agency	
November 1, 2000	Corey Hirsch	Portland Pirates (AHL)	1-year	Free agency	
May 3, 2001	Martin Hlinka	Portland Pirates (AHL)	1-year	Free agency	

=== Players lost ===
Date	Player	New team	Via (Note: In parentheses is the player's free agency group on July 1 if applicable.)	Ref
June 23, 2000	Barrie Moore	Columbus Blue Jackets	Expansion draft	
June 23, 2000	Oleg Orekhovsky	Minnesota Wild	Expansion draft	
July 1, 2000	Trevor Halverson (Note: Halverson suffered a career-ending concussion during a September 25, 1999 preseason game.)		Contract expiration (VI)	
July 1, 2000	Michal Pivonka (Note: Pivonka retired.)		Contract expiration (III)	
July 3, 2000	Jim McKenzie	New Jersey Devils	Free agency (UFA)	
July 27, 2000	Steve Poapst	Chicago Blackhawks	Free agency (VI)	
July 27, 2000	Jeff Toms	New York Islanders	Free agency (UFA)	
August 25, 2000	Martin Brochu	Calgary Flames	Free agency (VI)	
September 10, 2000	Stephane Richer		Retirement	
December 2000	Joe Murphy		Release	
May 22, 2001	David Emma	Nurnberg Ice Tigers (DEL)	Free agency	

=== Signings ===
Date	Player	Term	Contract type	Ref
June 27, 2000	Patrick Boileau	2-year	Re-signing	
June 27, 2000	Joe Sacco	2-year (Note: Club option for a third year.)	Re-signing	
June 28, 2000	Joe Murphy	1-year	Re-signing	
June 29, 2000	Craig Billington	3-year	Re-signing	
July 31, 2000	Andrei Nikolishin	1-year	Re-signing	
August 1, 2000	Sebastien Charpentier		Re-signing	
August 1, 2000	Matt Herr		Re-signing	
August 1, 2000	Mike Peluso		Re-signing	
August 2, 2000	Rob Zettler	1-year	Re-signing	
August 3, 2000	Michal Sivek	3-year	Entry-level	
August 15, 2000	Brendan Witt	2-year	Arbitration award	
August 16, 2000	Ken Klee	3-year	Re-signing	
September 15, 2000	Jan Bulis	3-year	Re-signing	
September 23, 2000	Ryan Van Buskirk	3-year	Entry-level	
September 28, 2000	Jakub Cutta	3-year	Entry-level	
September 29, 2000	Kris Beech	3-year	Entry-level	
October 1, 2000	Matt Pettinger	3-year	Entry-level	
October 3, 2000	Sergei Gonchar	4-year	Re-signing	
October 23, 2000	Chris Simon	2-year	Re-signing	
December 13, 2000	Steve Konowalchuk	4-year	Extension	
February 1, 2001	Peter Bondra	2-year (Note: Club options for a third and fourth year.)	Extension	
February 8, 2001	Kyle Clark	3-year	Entry-level	
February 20, 2001	Ross Lupaschuk	3-year	Entry-level	
March 28, 2001	Chris Corrinet	2-year	Entry-level	
May 29, 2001	Roman Tvrdon	3-year	Entry-level	
June 1, 2001	Nolan Yonkman	3-year	Entry-level	

== Draft picks ==
Washington's draft picks at the 2000 NHL entry draft held at the Pengrowth Saddledome in Calgary, Alberta.

Round	#	Player	Nationality	College/Junior/Club team (League)
1	26	Brian Sutherby	Canada	Moose Jaw Warriors (WHL)
2	43	Matt Pettinger	Canada	Calgary Hitmen (WHL)
2	61	Jakub Cutta	Czech Republic	Swift Current Broncos (WHL)
4	121	Ryan Van Buskirk	Canada	Sarnia Sting (OHL)
5	163	Ivan Nepryaev	Russia	Lokomotiv Yaroslavl (Russia)
9	289	Bjorn Nord	Sweden	Djurgardens IF (Sweden)

== See also ==
- 2000–01 NHL season
