= 2000–01 Dallas Stars season =

National Hockey League team season

2000–01 Dallas Stars
- Pacific Division champions
- Division: 1st Pacific
- Conference: 3rd Western
- 2000–01 record: 48–24–8–2
- Home record: 26–10–5–0
- Road record: 22–14–3–2
- Goals for: 241
- Goals against: 187

Team information
- General manager: Bob Gainey
- Coach: Ken Hitchcock
- Captain: Derian Hatcher
- Arena: Reunion Arena
- Average attendance: 17,001
- Minor league affiliate: Utah Grizzlies

Team leaders
- Goals: Brett Hull (39)
- Assists: Mike Modano (51)
- Points: Mike Modano (84)
- Penalty minutes: Brenden Morrow (128)
- Plus/minus: Brad Lukowich (+28)
- Wins: Ed Belfour (35)
- Goals against average: Marty Turco (1.90)

The 2000–01 Dallas Stars season was the Stars' eighth season as the Dallas Stars and 34th overall of the franchise. The Stars qualified for the playoffs for the fifth consecutive season. They beat the Oilers in six games in the Western Conference quarterfinals but they were upset in the ensuing round by the St. Louis Blues, being swept with losses of 4–2, 2–1, 3–2 (in double overtime), and 4–1.

== Regular season ==
=== Final standings ===
Pacific Division
No.	CR		GP	W	L	T	OTL	GF	GA	Pts
1	3	**Dallas Stars**	82	48	24	8	2	241	187	106
2	5	**San Jose Sharks**	82	40	27	12	3	217	192	95
3	7	**Los Angeles Kings**	82	38	28	13	3	252	228	92
4	9	Phoenix Coyotes	82	35	27	17	3	214	212	90
5	15	Mighty Ducks of Anaheim	82	25	41	11	5	188	245	66

Note: CR = Conference rank; GP = Games played; W = Wins; L = Losses; T = Ties; OTL = Overtime loss; GF = Goals for; GA = Goals against; Pts = Points
Bolded teams qualified for the playoffs.

Western Conference
R		Div	GP	W	L	T	OTL	GF	GA	Pts
**1**	**p – Colorado Avalanche**	**NW**	**82**	**52**	**16**	**10**	**4**	**270**	**192**	**118**
**2**	**y – Detroit Red Wings**	**CEN**	**82**	**49**	**20**	**9**	**4**	**253**	**202**	**111**
**3**	**y – Dallas Stars**	**PAC**	**82**	**48**	**24**	**8**	**2**	**241**	**187**	**106**
**4**	**St. Louis Blues**	**CEN**	**82**	**43**	**22**	**12**	**5**	**249**	**195**	**103**
**5**	**San Jose Sharks**	**PAC**	**82**	**40**	**27**	**12**	**3**	**217**	**192**	**95**
**6**	**Edmonton Oilers**	**NW**	**82**	**39**	**28**	**12**	**3**	**243**	**222**	**93**
**7**	**Los Angeles Kings**	**PAC**	**82**	**38**	**28**	**13**	**3**	**252**	**228**	**92**
**8**	**Vancouver Canucks**	**NW**	**82**	**36**	**28**	**11**	**7**	**239**	**238**	**90**
8.5
9	Phoenix Coyotes	PAC	82	35	27	17	3	214	212	90
10	Nashville Predators	CEN	82	34	36	9	3	186	200	80
11	Calgary Flames	NW	82	27	36	15	4	197	236	73
12	Chicago Blackhawks	CEN	82	29	40	8	5	210	246	71
13	Columbus Blue Jackets	CEN	82	28	39	9	6	190	233	71
14	Minnesota Wild	NW	82	25	39	13	5	168	210	68
15	Mighty Ducks of Anaheim	PAC	82	25	41	11	5	188	245	66

Divisions: CEN – Central, PAC – Pacific, NW – Northwest

bold – Qualified for playoffs; p – Won Presidents' Trophy; y – Won division

== Schedule and results ==
=== Regular season ===
2000–01 regular season
October: 6–4–1–1 (home: 4–2–1–0; road: 2–2–0–1)

Game	Date	Score	Opponent	Record	Recap
1	October 4, 2000	2–2 OT	Colorado Avalanche (2000–01)	0–0–1–0	T
2	October 7, 2000	1–3	@ Ottawa Senators (2000–01)	0–1–1–0	L
3	October 9, 2000	3–1	@ Toronto Maple Leafs (2000–01)	1–1–1–0	W
4	October 10, 2000	2–5	@ Carolina Hurricanes (2000–01)	1–2–1–0	L
5	October 12, 2000	4–1	Philadelphia Flyers (2000–01)	2–2–1–0	W
6	October 14, 2000	3–0	Washington Capitals (2000–01)	3–2–1–0	W
7	October 18, 2000	2–1	San Jose Sharks (2000–01)	4–2–1–0	W
8	October 20, 2000	5–1	@ Chicago Blackhawks (2000–01)	5–2–1–0	W
9	October 21, 2000	4–3	Los Angeles Kings (2000–01)	6–2–1–0	W
10	October 25, 2000	2–6	Vancouver Canucks (2000–01)	6–3–1–0	L
11	October 27, 2000	2–4	Phoenix Coyotes (2000–01)	6–4–1–0	L
12	October 28, 2000	3–4 OT	@ St. Louis Blues (2000–01)	6–4–1–1	OTL

November: 7–2–2–0 (home: 4–1–0–0; road: 3–1–2–0)

Game	Date	Score	Opponent	Record	Recap
13	November 1, 2000	4–0	Columbus Blue Jackets (2000–01)	7–4–1–1	W
14	November 3, 2000	2–2 OT	@ Phoenix Coyotes (2000–01)	7–4–2–1	T
15	November 11, 2000	2–0	Montreal Canadiens (2000–01)	8–4–2–1	W
16	November 14, 2000	2–3	@ Columbus Blue Jackets (2000–01)	8–5–2–1	L
17	November 15, 2000	2–2 OT	@ Buffalo Sabres (2000–01)	8–5–3–1	T
18	November 17, 2000	1–0	@ Detroit Red Wings (2000–01)	9–5–3–1	W
19	November 20, 2000	6–2	Tampa Bay Lightning (2000–01)	10–5–3–1	W
20	November 22, 2000	1–0	@ Nashville Predators (2000–01)	11–5–3–1	W
21	November 24, 2000	3–0	Columbus Blue Jackets (2000–01)	12–5–3–1	W
22	November 25, 2000	4–2	@ Columbus Blue Jackets (2000–01)	13–5–3–1	W
23	November 29, 2000	3–4	Calgary Flames (2000–01)	13–6–3–1	L

December: 8–5–1–0 (home: 4–1–0–0; road: 4–4–1–0)

Game	Date	Score	Opponent	Record	Recap
24	December 1, 2000	2–4	@ Colorado Avalanche (2000–01)	13–7–3–1	L
25	December 2, 2000	5–2	@ Phoenix Coyotes (2000–01)	14–7–3–1	W
26	December 6, 2000	2–2 OT	@ San Jose Sharks (2000–01)	14–7–4–1	T
27	December 7, 2000	2–5	@ Los Angeles Kings (2000–01)	14–8–4–1	L
28	December 10, 2000	1–0	@ Mighty Ducks of Anaheim (2000–01)	15–8–4–1	W
29	December 13, 2000	5–2	Edmonton Oilers (2000–01)	16–8–4–1	W
30	December 15, 2000	4–1	Chicago Blackhawks (2000–01)	17–8–4–1	W
31	December 17, 2000	0–6	@ Minnesota Wild (2000–01)	17–9–4–1	L
32	December 20, 2000	1–4	@ New Jersey Devils (2000–01)	17–10–4–1	L
33	December 21, 2000	3–1	@ New York Islanders (2000–01)	18–10–4–1	W
34	December 23, 2000	8–2	@ Pittsburgh Penguins (2000–01)	19–10–4–1	W
35	December 27, 2000	3–1	Mighty Ducks of Anaheim (2000–01)	20–10–4–1	W
36	December 29, 2000	1–4	Los Angeles Kings (2000–01)	20–11–4–1	L
37	December 31, 2000	6–1	New York Rangers (2000–01)	21–11–4–1	W

January: 7–7–0–0 (home: 3–3–0–0; road: 4–4–0–0)

Game	Date	Score	Opponent	Record	Recap
38	January 4, 2001	2–4	@ Detroit Red Wings (2000–01)	21–12–4–1	L
39	January 6, 2001	4–0	@ Boston Bruins (2000–01)	22–12–4–1	W
40	January 8, 2001	2–1	@ New York Rangers (2000–01)	23–12–4–1	W
41	January 10, 2001	3–2	@ Atlanta Thrashers (2000–01)	24–12–4–1	W
42	January 12, 2001	2–3	Detroit Red Wings (2000–01)	24–13–4–1	L
43	January 14, 2001	3–2	@ Tampa Bay Lightning (2000–01)	25–13–4–1	W
44	January 15, 2001	0–2	@ Florida Panthers (2000–01)	25–14–4–1	L
45	January 17, 2001	4–3 OT	Nashville Predators (2000–01)	26–14–4–1	W
46	January 19, 2001	6–5 OT	Pittsburgh Penguins (2000–01)	27–14–4–1	W
47	January 21, 2001	2–5	@ Phoenix Coyotes (2000–01)	27–15–4–1	L
48	January 22, 2001	2–1	Vancouver Canucks (2000–01)	28–15–4–1	W
49	January 24, 2001	1–4	New Jersey Devils (2000–01)	28–16–4–1	L
50	January 26, 2001	1–2	San Jose Sharks (2000–01)	28–17–4–1	L
51	January 30, 2001	0–8	@ Los Angeles Kings (2000–01)	28–18–4–1	L

February: 7–4–1–1 (home: 5–2–1–0; road: 2–2–0–1)

Game	Date	Score	Opponent	Record	Recap
52	February 1, 2001	4–2	@ San Jose Sharks (2000–01)	29–18–4–1	W
53	February 7, 2001	3–2	Edmonton Oilers (2000–01)	30–18–4–1	W
54	February 9, 2001	1–2	Minnesota Wild (2000–01)	30–19–4–1	L
55	February 11, 2001	3–3 OT	St. Louis Blues (2000–01)	30–19–5–1	T
56	February 13, 2001	2–1	@ Nashville Predators (2000–01)	31–19–5–1	W
57	February 14, 2001	4–2	Los Angeles Kings (2000–01)	32–19–5–1	W
58	February 16, 2001	3–2 OT	Mighty Ducks of Anaheim (2000–01)	33–19–5–1	W
59	February 18, 2001	1–2	Detroit Red Wings (2000–01)	33–20–5–1	L
60	February 21, 2001	6–2	Minnesota Wild (2000–01)	34–20–5–1	W
61	February 23, 2001	5–4 OT	Boston Bruins (2000–01)	35–20–5–1	W
62	February 25, 2001	2–3 OT	@ Edmonton Oilers (2000–01)	35–20–5–2	OTL
63	February 26, 2001	2–3	@ Calgary Flames (2000–01)	35–21–5–2	L
64	February 28, 2001	4–5	@ Vancouver Canucks (2000–01)	35–22–5–2	L

March: 11–2–2–0 (home: 5–1–2–0; road: 6–1–0–0)

Game	Date	Score	Opponent	Record	Recap
65	March 2, 2001	5–2	@ Mighty Ducks of Anaheim (2000–01)	36–22–5–2	W
66	March 4, 2001	4–1	Buffalo Sabres (2000–01)	37–22–5–2	W
67	March 7, 2001	1–4	Chicago Blackhawks (2000–01)	37–23–5–2	L
68	March 10, 2001	3–2 OT	Colorado Avalanche (2000–01)	38–23–5–2	W
69	March 11, 2001	2–3	@ Colorado Avalanche (2000–01)	38–24–5–2	L
70	March 13, 2001	3–0	@ Chicago Blackhawks (2000–01)	39–24–5–2	W
71	March 16, 2001	1–1 OT	Phoenix Coyotes (2000–01)	39–24–6–2	T
72	March 18, 2001	5–1	Ottawa Senators (2000–01)	40–24–6–2	W
73	March 19, 2001	4–1	@ Minnesota Wild (2000–01)	41–24–6–2	W
74	March 21, 2001	8–0	Mighty Ducks of Anaheim (2000–01)	42–24–6–2	W
75	March 23, 2001	2–1	New York Islanders (2000–01)	43–24–6–2	W
76	March 25, 2001	1–1 OT	St. Louis Blues (2000–01)	43–24–7–2	T
77	March 28, 2001	3–1	@ Vancouver Canucks (2000–01)	44–24–7–2	W
78	March 30, 2001	5–4	@ Edmonton Oilers (2000–01)	45–24–7–2	W
79	March 31, 2001	2–0	@ Calgary Flames (2000–01)	46–24–7–2	W

April: 2–0–1–0 (home: 1–0–1–0; road: 1–0–0–0)

Game	Date	Score	Opponent	Record	Recap
80	April 2, 2001	4–4 OT	Calgary Flames (2000–01)	46–24–8–2	T
81	April 4, 2001	5–1	Nashville Predators (2000–01)	47–24–8–2	W
82	April 7, 2001	5–4 OT	@ San Jose Sharks (2000–01)	48–24–8–2	W

Legend: W Win (2 points) L Loss (0 points) T Tie (1 point) OTL Overtime loss (1 point)

=== Playoffs ===
2001 Stanley Cup playoffs
Western Conference Quarterfinals vs. (6) Edmonton Oilers: Stars win 4–2

Game	Date	Score	Opponent	Series	Recap
1	April 11, 2001	2–1 OT	Edmonton Oilers	Stars lead 1–0	W
2	April 14, 2001	3–4	Edmonton Oilers	Series tied 1–1	L
3	April 15, 2001	3–2 OT	@ Edmonton Oilers	Stars lead 2–1	W
4	April 17, 2001	1–2 OT	@ Edmonton Oilers	Series tied 2–2	L
5	April 19, 2001	4–3 OT	Edmonton Oilers	Stars lead 3–2	W
6	April 21, 2001	3–1	@ Edmonton Oilers	Stars win 4–2	W

Western Conference Semifinals vs. (4) St. Louis Blues: Blues win 4–0

Game	Date	Score	Opponent	Series	Recap
1	April 27, 2001	2–4	St. Louis Blues	Blues lead 1–0	L
2	April 29, 2001	1–2	St. Louis Blues	Blues lead 2–0	L
3	May 1, 2001	2–3 2OT	@ St. Louis Blues	Blues lead 3–0	L
4	May 3, 2001	1–4	@ St. Louis Blues	Blues win 4–0	L

Legend: W Win L Loss

== Player statistics ==
=== Scoring ===
- Position abbreviations: C = Center; D = Defense; G = Goaltender; LW = Left wing; RW = Right wing
- † = Joined team via a transaction (e.g., trade, waivers, signing) during the season. Stats reflect time with the Stars only.
- ‡ = Left team via a transaction (e.g., trade, waivers, release) during the season. Stats reflect time with the Stars only.

No.	Player	Pos	Regular season						Playoffs					
No.	Player	Pos	GP	G	A	Pts	+/-	PIM	GP	G	A	Pts	+/-	PIM
9	Mike Modano	C	81	33	51	84	26	52	9	3	4	7	1	0
16	Brett Hull	RW	79	39	40	79	10	18	10	2	5	7	−1	6
25	Joe Nieuwendyk	C	69	29	23	52	5	30	7	4	0	4	−2	4
56	Sergei Zubov	D	79	10	41	51	22	24	10	1	5	6	2	4
5	Darryl Sydor	D	81	10	37	47	5	34	10	1	3	4	−2	0
26	Jere Lehtinen	RW	74	20	25	45	14	24	10	1	0	1	−4	2
10	Brenden Morrow	LW	82	20	24	44	18	128	10	0	3	3	1	12
29	Grant Marshall	RW	75	13	24	37	1	64	9	0	0	0	−1	0
15	Jamie Langenbrunner	RW	53	12	18	30	4	57	10	2	2	4	2	6
17	Ted Donato	LW	65	8	17	25	6	26	8	0	1	1	0	0
12	Mike Keane	RW	67	10	14	24	4	35	10	3	2	5	1	4
27	Shaun Van Allen	C	59	7	16	23	5	16	8	0	2	2	1	8
2	Derian Hatcher	D	80	2	21	23	5	77	10	0	1	1	−7	16
24	Richard Matvichuk	D	78	4	16	20	5	62	10	0	0	0	−2	14
37	Brad Lukowich	D	80	4	10	14	28	76	10	1	0	1	2	4
33	Benoit Hogue†	C	34	3	7	10	−1	26	7	1	0	1	−4	6
22	Kirk Muller	LW	55	1	9	10	−4	26	10	1	3	4	0	12
36	Roman Lyashenko	C	60	6	3	9	−1	45	1	0	0	0	0	0
55	Tyler Bouck	C	48	2	5	7	−3	29	1	0	0	0	0	0
51	John MacLean†	RW	28	4	2	6	0	17	10	2	1	3	−3	6
11	Blake Sloan‡	RW	33	2	2	4	−2	4	—	—	—	—	—	—
6 (Note: Helenius wore number 4 until Diduck was acquired.)	Sami Helenius	D	57	1	2	3	1	99	1	0	0	0	0	0
14	Jon Sim	LW	15	0	3	3	−2	6	—	—	—	—	—	—
46	Jamie Wright	LW	2	1	0	1	−3	0	—	—	—	—	—	—
20	Ed Belfour	G	63	0	1	1		4	10	0	0	0		6
18	Grant Ledyard†	D	8	0	1	1	3	4	9	0	1	1	2	4
4	Gerald Diduck†	D	14	0	0	0	4	18	—	—	—	—	—	—
42	Steve Gainey	LW	1	0	0	0	0	0	—	—	—	—	—	—
28	Ric Jackman	D	16	0	0	0	−6	18	—	—	—	—	—	—
40	Greg Leeb	C	2	0	0	0	−1	0	—	—	—	—	—	—
35	Marty Turco	G	26	0	0	0		12	—	—	—	—	—	—
34	Mark Wotton	D	1	0	0	0	0	0	—	—	—	—	—	—

=== Goaltending ===
No.	Player	Regular season										Playoffs								
No.	Player	GP	W	L	T	SA	GA	GAA	SV%	SO	TOI	GP	W	L	SA	GA	GAA	SV%	SO	TOI
20	Ed Belfour	63	35	20	7	1508	144	2.34	.905	8	3687	10	4	6	277	25	2.23	.910	0	671
35	Marty Turco	26	13	6	1	532	40	1.90	.925	3	1266	—	—	—	—	—	—	—	—	—

== Awards and records ==
=== Awards ===
Type	Award/honor	Recipient	Ref
League (in-season)	NHL All-Star Game selection	Brett Hull	
Team	Star of the Game Award	Mike Modano	

=== Milestones ===
Milestone	Player	Date	Ref
First game	Tyler Bouck	October 4, 2000	
First game	Marty Turco	October 10, 2000	
First game	Greg Leeb	October 12, 2000	
First game	Steve Gainey	February 1, 2001	
1,000th game played	Brett Hull	February 25, 2001	

== Transactions ==
The Stars were involved in the following transactions from June 11, 2000, the day after the deciding game of the 2000 Stanley Cup Final, through June 9, 2001, the day of the deciding game of the 2001 Stanley Cup Final.

=== Trades ===
Date	Details		Ref
June 12, 2000	To Dallas Stars: 3rd-round pick in 2000; 4th-round pick in 2002	To Minnesota Wild: Manny Fernandez; Brad Lukowich	
June 25, 2000	To Dallas Stars: Brad Lukowich; 3rd-round pick in 2001; 9th-round pick in 2001	To Minnesota Wild: Aaron Gavey; Pavel Patera; 8th-round pick in 2000; Minnesota’s 4th-round pick in 2002	
August 11, 2000	To Dallas Stars: David Ling	To Chicago Blackhawks: Future considerations	
October 29, 2000	To Dallas Stars: Gerald Diduck	To Toronto Maple Leafs: Future considerations	
February 5, 2001	To Dallas Stars: John MacLean	To New York Rangers: Future considerations	
March 13, 2001	To Dallas Stars: Grant Ledyard	To Tampa Bay Lightning: Future considerations (Note: 7th-round pick in 2001.)	

=== Players acquired ===
Date	Player	Former team	Term	Via	Ref
June 12, 2000	Chad Alban	Mobile Mysticks (ECHL)	1-year	Free agency	
July 12, 2000	Sami Helenius	Colorado Avalanche	1-year	Free agency	
July 12, 2000	Rick Tabaracci	Columbus Blue Jackets	2-year	Free agency	
July 12, 2000	Shaun Van Allen	Ottawa Senators	2-year	Free agency	
July 26, 2000	Jeff Tory	Philadelphia Flyers	1-year	Free agency	
July 28, 2000	Eric Houde	Phoenix Coyotes	1-year	Free agency	
July 28, 2000	Chris Wells	New York Rangers	1-year	Free agency	
August 17, 2000	Ted Donato	Anaheim Mighty Ducks	1-year	Free agency	
January 5, 2001	Benoit Hogue	Phoenix Coyotes	2-year	Free agency	

=== Players lost ===
Date	Player	New team	Via (Note: In parentheses is the player's free agency group on July 1 if applicable.)	Ref
N/A	Keith Aldridge	Frankfurt Lions (DEL)	Free agency (UFA)	
June 23, 2000	Sergei Luchinkin	Columbus Blue Jackets	Expansion draft	
June 23, 2000	Jamie Pushor	Columbus Blue Jackets	Expansion draft	
June 29, 2000	Guy Carbonneau		Retirement	
July 1, 2000	Shawn Chambers (Note: Chambers retired.)		Contract expiration (III)	
July 1, 2000	Scott Thornton	San Jose Sharks	Free agency (V)	
July 6, 2000	Sylvain Cote	Washington Capitals	Free agency (III)	
July 27, 2000	Chris Murray	St. Louis Blues	Free agency	
August 16, 2000	Dave Manson	Toronto Maple Leafs	Free agency (III)	
August 29, 2000	Kelly Fairchild	Colorado Avalanche	Free agency (VI)	
August 31, 2000	Joel Bouchard	Phoenix Coyotes	Free agency (UFA)	
September 2000	Brian Skrudland		Retirement (III)	
September 1, 2000	Mel Angelstad	Manitoba Moose (IHL)	Free agency (UFA)	
September 28, 2000	Frederic Bouchard	Fort Wayne Komets (UHL)	Free agency (UFA)	
November 1, 2000	Matt Martin	Idaho Steelheads (WCHL)	Free agency (UFA)	
March 13, 2001	Blake Sloan	Columbus Blue Jackets	Waivers	

=== Signings ===
Date	Player	Term	Contract type	Ref
July 12, 2000	Mike Bales	1-year	Re-signing	
July 26, 2000	Brad Lukowich	1-year	Re-signing	
July 26, 2000	Marty Turco	1-year	Re-signing	
July 28, 2000	Jamie Wright	1-year	Re-signing	
July 31, 2000	Jamie Langenbrunner	1-year	Re-signing	
August 8, 2000	Jere Lehtinen	4-year	Re-signing	
August 17, 2000	Blake Sloan	1-year	Arbitration award	
October 5, 2000	Marty Turco	2-year (Note: Club option for a third year.)	Extension	
November 6, 2000	Dan Jancevski	3-year	Entry-level	
February 19, 2001	Justin Cox	3-year	Entry-level	
June 4, 2001	Jeff Bateman	3-year	Entry-level	

== Draft picks ==
Dallas's draft picks at the 2000 NHL entry draft held at the Pengrowth Saddledome in Calgary, Alberta.

Round	#	Player	Nationality	College/Junior/Club team (League)
1	25	Steve Ott	Canada	Windsor Spitfires (OHL)
2	60	Dan Ellis	Canada	North Bay Centennials (OHL)
3	68	Joel Lundqvist	Sweden	Frolunda HC (Sweden)
3	91	Alexei Tereshchenko	Russia	Dynamo Moscow (Russia)
4	123	Vadim Khomitsky	Russia	HC Moscow (Russia)
5	139	Ruslan Bernikov	Russia	Amur Khabarovsk (Russia)
5	162	Artyom Chernov	Russia	Metallurg Novokuznetsk (Russia)
6	192	Ladislav Vlcek	Czech Republic	Rabat Kladno Jr. (Czech Republic)
7	219	Marco Tuokko	Finland	TPS Jr. (Finland)
7	224	Antti Miettinen	Finland	HPK (Finland)

== See also ==
- 2000–01 NHL season
