= Steve Washburn =

Canadian ice hockey player

- Born: April 10, 1975 (age 51) Ottawa, Ontario, Canada
- Height: 6 ft 2 in (188 cm)
- Weight: 191 lb (87 kg; 13 st 9 lb)
- Position: Centre
- Shot: Left
- Played for: Florida Panthers; Vancouver Canucks; Philadelphia Flyers
- NHL draft: 78th overall, 1993; Florida Panthers
- Playing career: 1995–2008

Steven Robert Washburn (born April 10, 1975) is a Canadian former professional ice hockey centre who played parts of six seasons in the National Hockey League (NHL) between 1995 and 2001 for the Florida Panthers, Vancouver Canucks and Philadelphia Flyers.

== Playing career ==
From 1990 to 1991 Washburn played in the Central Junior Hockey League with the Gloucester Rangers. The team made it to the Provincials and earned the silver medal. Washburn received the "best forward" award.

Washburn played in the Ontario Hockey League with the Ottawa 67's from 1991 to 1995. He was a star player throughout his Junior A hockey career with the Ottawa 67's. In his final year with the 67's [1994-95] he had accumulated 106 points in 63 games [43 goals/63 assists].

In 1992 he played for Team Ontario in the World Hockey Challenge '92. They won the gold medal and were awarded "The Ontario Team of the Year for 1992". By invitation, he tried out for the under 17 National Team which took place in Red Deer, Alberta.

Washburn was drafted by the Florida Panthers in the 1993 NHL Entry Draft, in the 3rd round, selected 78th overall. He played his first NHL game with the Panthers during the 1995-96 NHL season, recording an assist. He played just that one regular season game plus a playoff game where he recorded another assist. That season, the Panthers lost to the Colorado Avalanche in the Stanley Cup finals.

The following season Washburn played 18 games getting nine points with the Panthers. He played 58 games with the Panthers in the 1997–98 season getting 19 points. Unfortunately, after recovering from two groin injuries, Washburn, in his first game back, was slashed and was again out with a broken finger. Washburn played four games with the Panthers in the 1998–99 season before being put on waivers wherein on February 18, 1999, the Vancouver Canucks picked him up.

He played eight games with the Canucks in the 1998–99 season. August 10, 1999, Washburn was signed as a free agent by the Nashville Predators and on November 16, 1999, Nashville traded him to the Philadelphia Flyers for future considerations.

July 26, 2000, he signed as a free agent by the EHC Kloten Flyers of the Swiss League. After 3 months of playing with EHC Kloten, Washburn was contacted by the Philadelphia Flyers who then purchased his contract from EHC Kloten. He was signed as a free agent by the Flyers on November 21, 2000. He had to wait for a month for an NHL rule to be changed before he could play. He played four games in two seasons for the Philadelphia Flyers.

After the 2000–01 season, he went back to Europe to play in the German hockey league, the Danish Hockey League and the Austrian League. When Graz EC did not make the playoffs (2007–08), Washburn went to play for SC Bietigheim-Bissingen for the remainder of their season.

== Career statistics ==
=== Regular season and playoffs ===
| | | | Regular season | | | | | Playoffs |
| Season | Team | League | GP | G | A | Pts | PIM | GP | G | A | Pts | PIM |
|---|---|---|---|---|---|---|---|---|---|---|---|---|
| 1990–91 | Gloucester Rangers | CJHL | 56 | 21 | 30 | 51 | 47 | — | — | — | — | — |
| 1991–92 | Ottawa 67's | OHL | 59 | 5 | 17 | 22 | 10 | 11 | 2 | 3 | 5 | 4 |
| 1992–93 | Ottawa 67's | OHL | 66 | 20 | 38 | 58 | 54 | — | — | — | — | — |
| 1993–94 | Ottawa 67's | OHL | 65 | 30 | 50 | 80 | 88 | 17 | 7 | 16 | 23 | 10 |
| 1994–95 | Ottawa 67's | OHL | 63 | 43 | 63 | 106 | 72 | — | — | — | — | — |
| 1994–95 | Cincinnati Cyclones | IHL | 6 | 3 | 1 | 4 | 0 | 9 | 1 | 3 | 4 | 4 |
| 1995–96 | Carolina Monarchs | AHL | 78 | 29 | 54 | 83 | 45 | — | — | — | — | — |
| 1995–96 | Florida Panthers | NHL | 1 | 0 | 1 | 1 | 0 | 1 | 0 | 1 | 1 | 0 |
| 1996–97 | Carolina Monarchs | AHL | 60 | 23 | 40 | 63 | 66 | — | — | — | — | — |
| 1996–97 | Florida Panthers | NHL | 18 | 3 | 6 | 9 | 4 | — | — | — | — | — |
| 1997–98 | Florida Panthers | NHL | 58 | 11 | 8 | 19 | 32 | — | — | — | — | — |
| 1997–98 | Beast of New Haven | AHL | 6 | 3 | 5 | 8 | 4 | 3 | 2 | 0 | 2 | 15 |
| 1998–99 | Beast of New Haven | AHL | 10 | 4 | 3 | 7 | 6 | — | — | — | — | — |
| 1998–99 | Florida Panthers | NHL | 4 | 0 | 0 | 0 | 4 | — | — | — | — | — |
| 1998–99 | Vancouver Canucks | NHL | 8 | 0 | 0 | 0 | 2 | — | — | — | — | — |
| 1998–99 | Syracuse Crunch | AHL | 13 | 1 | 6 | 7 | 6 | — | — | — | — | — |
| 1999–00 | Milwaukee Admirals | IHL | 12 | 0 | 4 | 4 | 16 | — | — | — | — | — |
| 1999–00 | Philadelphia Phantoms | AHL | 61 | 19 | 52 | 71 | 93 | 5 | 0 | 2 | 2 | 8 |
| 1999–00 | Philadelphia Flyers | NHL | 1 | 0 | 0 | 0 | 0 | — | — | — | — | — |
| 2000–01 | Kloten Flyers | NLA | 8 | 0 | 6 | 6 | 16 | — | — | — | — | — |
| 2000–01 | Philadelphia Phantoms | AHL | 46 | 12 | 16 | 28 | 52 | 2 | 0 | 0 | 0 | 2 |
| 2000–01 | Philadelphia Flyers | NHL | 3 | 0 | 0 | 0 | 0 | — | — | — | — | — |
| 2001–02 | Iserlohn Roosters | DEL | 38 | 7 | 14 | 21 | 59 | — | — | — | — | — |
| 2002–03 | Iserlohn Roosters | DEL | 51 | 12 | 18 | 30 | 40 | — | — | — | — | — |
| 2003–04 | Hamburg Freezers | DEL | 48 | 4 | 11 | 15 | 71 | 11 | 1 | 1 | 2 | 39 |
| 2004–05 | Klagenfurt AC | AUT | 48 | 12 | 27 | 39 | 71 | 12 | 3 | 12 | 15 | 16 |
| 2005–06 | Graz 99ers | AUT | 22 | 10 | 13 | 23 | 26 | — | — | — | — | — |
| 2006–07 | Graz 99ers | AUT | 55 | 9 | 30 | 39 | 102 | — | — | — | — | — |
| 2007–08 | Graz 99ers | AUT | 40 | 7 | 16 | 23 | 50 | — | — | — | — | — |
| 2007–08 | SC Bietigheim-Bissingen | GER-2 | 12 | 1 | 3 | 4 | 16 | 4 | 0 | 1 | 1 | 4 |
| NHL totals | | | 93 | 14 | 15 | 29 | 42 | 1 | 0 | 1 | 1 | 0 |
