= David Cooper (ice hockey) =

Canadian ice hockey player (born 1973)

- Born: November 2, 1973 (age 52) Ottawa, Ontario, Canada
- Height: 6 ft 2 in (188 cm)
- Weight: 205 lb (93 kg; 14 st 9 lb)
- Position: Defence
- Shot: Left
- Played for: Toronto Maple Leafs; Kassel Huskies; Eisbären Berlin; SKA St. Petersburg; Iserlohn Roosters; HC Asiago; HC Alleghe; Rødovre Mighty Bulls
- NHL draft: 11th overall, 1992; Buffalo Sabres
- Playing career: 1993–2005

David Cooper (born November 2, 1973) is a Canadian former professional ice hockey defenceman. He was drafted in the first round, 11th overall, by the Buffalo Sabres in the 1992 NHL entry draft.

He received the WHL East First All-Star Team award in 1992.

== Playing career ==
As a youth, Cooper played in the 1987 Quebec International Pee-Wee Hockey Tournament with the Winnipeg South Monarchs minor ice hockey team.

After playing four seasons in the Western Hockey League with the Medicine Hat Tigers, Cooper made his professional debut with Buffalo's American Hockey League affiliate, the Rochester Americans, in the 1993 Calder Cup Playoffs. Cooper then played three full seasons with the Sabres' organization, with the Americans as well as the team's ECHL affiliate, the South Carolina Stingrays.

Cooper made his National Hockey League debut with the Toronto Maple Leafs during the 1996–97 season, appearing in 19 games and scoring three goals. Cooper would play nine more games with Toronto in 1997–98 and two more in 2000–01, giving him a total of 30 games played in the NHL.

In his brief NHL career, Cooper scored three goals and added seven assists.

Cooper also played in Germany's Deutsche Eishockey Liga, the Russian Hockey Super League, the Danish Oddset Ligaen and Italy's Serie A before retiring from the game.

== Career statistics ==
			Regular season					Playoffs
Season	Team	League	GP	G	A	Pts	PIM	GP	G	A	Pts	PIM
1988–89	Edmonton Mets	AJHL	32	24	22	46	151	—	—	—	—	—
1989–90	Medicine Hat Tigers	WHL	61	4	11	15	65	3	0	2	2	2
1990–91	Medicine Hat Tigers	WHL	64	12	31	43	66	11	1	3	4	23
1991–92	Medicine Hat Tigers	WHL	72	17	47	64	176	4	1	4	5	8
1992–93	Medicine Hat Tigers	WHL	63	15	50	65	88	10	2	2	4	32
1992–93	Rochester Americans	AHL	—	—	—	—	—	2	0	0	0	2
1993–94	Rochester Americans	AHL	68	10	25	35	82	4	1	1	2	2
1994–95	Rochester Americans	AHL	21	2	4	6	48	—	—	—	—	—
1994–95	South Carolina Stingrays	ECHL	39	9	19	28	90	9	3	8	11	24
1995–96	Rochester Americans	AHL	67	9	18	27	79	8	0	1	1	12
1996–97	St. John's Maple Leafs	AHL	44	16	19	35	65	—	—	—	—	—
1996–97	Toronto Maple Leafs	NHL	19	3	3	6	16	—	—	—	—	—
1997–98	St. John's Maple Leafs	AHL	60	19	23	42	117	4	0	1	1	6
1997–98	Toronto Maple Leafs	NHL	9	0	4	4	8	—	—	—	—	—
1998–99	Saint John Flames	AHL	65	18	24	42	121	7	1	4	5	10
1999–2000	Kassel Huskies	DEL	55	11	13	24	82	6	2	1	3	38
2000–01	St. John's Maple Leafs	AHL	71	16	26	42	117	4	1	1	2	10
2000–01	Toronto Maple Leafs	NHL	2	0	0	0	0	—	—	—	—	—
2001–02	Eisbären Berlin	DEL	54	15	13	28	155	4	0	1	1	6
2002–03	SKA St. Petersburg	RSL	10	1	2	3	36	—	—	—	—	—
2003–04	Iserlohn Roosters	DEL	47	3	11	14	186	—	—	—	—	—
2004–05	HC Asiago	ITA	19	8	8	16	52	—	—	—	—	—
2004–05	HC Alleghe	ITA	10	4	2	6	43	—	—	—	—	—
2005–06	Rødovre Mighty Bulls	DNK	32	9	5	14	106	6	4	2	6	75
2006–07	Rødovre Mighty Bulls	DNK	18	4	10	14	92	4	1	0	1	10
2007–08	SG Pontebba	ITA	26	11	8	19	86	5	2	1	3	12
AHL totals			396	90	139	229	629	27	3	8	11	40
NHL totals			30	3	7	10	24	—	—	—	—	—
DEL totals			156	29	37	66	423	10	2	2	4	44

== Awards ==
- WHL East First All-Star Team – 1992

Awards and achievements
Preceded by Philippe Boucher	Buffalo Sabres first-round draft pick 1992	Succeeded by Wayne Primeau
