= Chris McAllister =

Canadian ice hockey player

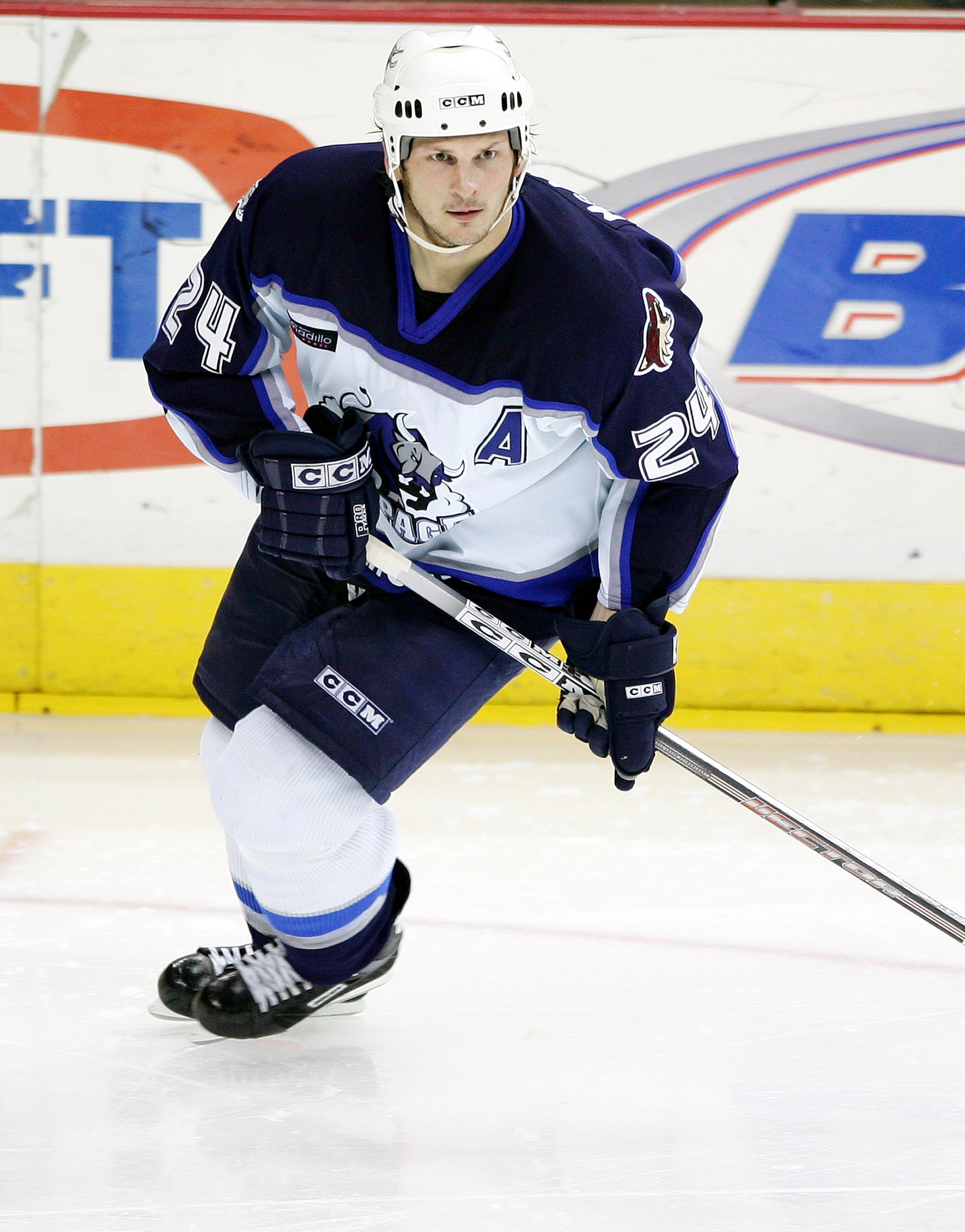
- McAllister with the San Antonio Rampage in 2006
- Born: June 16, 1975 (age 50) Saskatoon, Saskatchewan, Canada
- Height: 6 ft 8 in (203 cm)
- Weight: 250 lb (113 kg; 17 st 12 lb)
- Position: Defence
- Shot: Left
- Played for: Vancouver Canucks; Toronto Maple Leafs; Philadelphia Flyers; Colorado Avalanche; New York Rangers
- NHL draft: 40th overall, 1995; Vancouver Canucks
- Playing career: 1995–2010

Christopher J. McAllister (born June 16, 1975) is a Canadian former professional ice hockey defenceman who played in the National Hockey League (NHL) with the Vancouver Canucks, Toronto Maple Leafs, Philadelphia Flyers, Colorado Avalanche and New York Rangers.

== Playing career ==
McAllister was drafted 40th overall by the Vancouver Canucks in the 1995 NHL entry draft. After playing with the Canucks, McAllister played 56 games for the Toronto Maple Leafs from 1998–2000 before playing with the Philadelphia Flyers, Colorado Avalanche, and the New York Rangers.

McAllister played in the Elite Ice Hockey League for the Newcastle Vipers during the NHL lockout. He signed with the Phoenix Coyotes on August 11, 2005. He spent one full season with the Coyotes' AHL affiliate the San Antonio Rampage before signed for the Kalamazoo Wings of the UHL. McAllister recorded NHL career totals of four goals, seventeen assists and 634 penalty minutes in 301 regular season games as well as one assist in nine playoff games. He is currently an instructor at a hockey school in Superior, Colorado. On August 30, 2009 Chris signed a contract with the Wichita Thunder of the CHL.

Chris McAllister is considered to be one of the tallest players ever in NHL history.

== Career statistics ==
=== Regular season and playoffs ===
			Regular season					Playoffs
Season	Team	League	GP	G	A	Pts	PIM	GP	G	A	Pts	PIM
1992–93	Saskatoon Blades	WHL	4	0	0	0	2	—	—	—	—	—
1993–94	Saskatoon Blades	WHL	2	0	0	0	5	—	—	—	—	—
1994–95	Saskatoon Blades	WHL	65	2	8	10	134	10	0	0	0	28
1995–96	Syracuse Crunch	AHL	68	0	2	2	142	16	0	0	0	34
1996–97	Syracuse Crunch	AHL	43	3	1	4	108	3	0	0	0	6
1997–98	Syracuse Crunch	AHL	23	0	1	1	71	5	0	0	0	21
1997–98	Vancouver Canucks	NHL	36	1	2	3	106	—	—	—	—	—
1998–99	Syracuse Crunch	AHL	5	0	0	0	24	—	—	—	—	—
1998–99	Vancouver Canucks	NHL	28	1	1	63	—	—	—	—	—
1998–99	Toronto Maple Leafs	NHL	20	0	2	2	39	6	0	1	1	4
1999–00	Toronto Maple Leafs	NHL	36	0	3	3	68	—	—	—	—	—
2000–01	Philadelphia Flyers	NHL	60	2	2	4	124	2	0	0	0	0
2001–02	Philadelphia Flyers	NHL	42	0	5	5	113	—	—	—	—	—
2002–03	Philadelphia Flyers	NHL	19	0	0	0	21	—	—	—	—	—
2002–03	Philadelphia Phantoms	AHL	4	0	0	0	12	—	—	—	—	—
2002–03	Colorado Avalanche	NHL	14	0	1	1	26	1	0	0	0	0
2003–04	Colorado Avalanche	NHL	34	0	0	0	62	—	—	—	—	—
2003–04	New York Rangers	NHL	12	0	1	1	12	—	—	—	—	—
2004–05	Newcastle Vipers	EIHL	16	0	5	5	36	10	0	3	3	10
2005–06	San Antonio Rampage	AHL	59	3	6	9	171	—	—	—	—	—
2006–07	Kalamazoo Wings	UHL	40	2	7	9	118	18	2	6	8	30
2007–08	Hershey Bears	AHL	46	0	1	1	92	2	0	0	0	2
2008–09	Newcastle Vipers	EIHL	52	2	9	11	134	2	1	1	2	6
2009–10	Wichita Thunder	CHL	55	1	13	14	171	—	—	—	—	—
NHL totals			301	4	17	21	634	9	0	1	1	4
