= Petr Svoboda (ice hockey, born 1980) =

Czech ice hockey player

- Born: June 20, 1980 (age 45) Jihlava, Czechoslovakia
- Height: 6 ft 3 in (191 cm)
- Weight: 200 lb (91 kg; 14 st 4 lb)
- Position: Defence
- Shot: Right
- Played for: Dukla Jihlava; HC Oceláři Třinec; Toronto Maple Leafs
- NHL draft: 35th overall, 1998; Toronto Maple Leafs
- Playing career: 1998–2003

Petr Svoboda (born June 20, 1980) is a Czech former professional ice hockey defenceman. He was drafted in the second round, 35th overall, by the Toronto Maple Leafs in the 1998 NHL entry draft. His previous clubs were Dukla Jihlava and HC Oceláři Třinec. He played eighteen games in the National Hockey League with the Maple Leafs in the 2000–01 season.

== Career statistics ==
=== Regular season and playoffs ===
			Regular season					Playoffs
Season	Team	League	GP	G	A	Pts	PIM	GP	G	A	Pts	PIM
1995–96	HC Dukla Jihlava U18	CZE U18	38	4	12	16	50	—	—	—	—	—
1996–97	HC Dukla Jihlava U20	CZE U20	29	1	3	4	—	—	—	—	—	—
1997–98	HC Dukla Jihlava U20	CZE U20	12	0	2	2	—	—	—	—	—	—
1997–98	BK Havlíčkův Brod	CZE-2	18	1	2	3	16	—	—	—	—	—
1998–99	HC Dukla Jihlava	CZE	40	1	4	5	24	—	—	—	—	—
1999–00	HC Oceláři Třinec U20	CZE U20	1	1	0	1	0	—	—	—	—	—
1999–00	HC Oceláři Třinec	CZE	46	1	2	3	50	3	0	0	0	0
2000–01	Toronto Maple Leafs	NHL	18	1	2	3	10	—	—	—	—	—
2000–01	St. John's Maple Leafs	AHL	38	7	7	14	48	4	0	0	0	4
2001–02	St. John's Maple Leafs	AHL	74	3	10	13	58	11	0	1	1	6
2002–03	St. John's Maple Leafs	AHL	3	0	1	1	4	—	—	—	—	—
2002–03	HC Oceláři Třinec	CZE	5	0	1	1	0	—	—	—	—	—
NHL totals			18	1	2	3	10	—	—	—	—	—

=== International ===
Medal record

Representing Czech Republic

World Junior Championships
Gold medal – first place	2000 Sweden	

Year	Team	Event	GP	G	A	Pts	PIM
1998	Czech Republic	EJC	6	2	1	3	8
1999	Czech Republic	WJC	6	0	0	0	6
2000	Czech Republic	WJC	7	0	2	2	4
Junior totals			19	2	3	5	18
