= 2000–01 Ottawa Senators season =

NHL hockey team season

2000–01 Ottawa Senators
- Northeast Division champions
- Division: 1st Northeast
- Conference: 2nd Eastern
- 2000–01 record: 48–21–9–4
- Home record: 26–7–5–3
- Road record: 22–14–4–1
- Goals for: 274
- Goals against: 205

Team information
- General manager: Marshall Johnston
- Coach: Jacques Martin
- Captain: Daniel Alfredsson
- Alternate captains: Shawn McEachern; Wade Redden; Alexei Yashin
- Arena: Corel Centre
- Average attendance: 17,793
- Minor league affiliates: Grand Rapids Griffins; Mobile Mysticks

Team leaders
- Goals: Alexei Yashin (40)
- Assists: Alexei Yashin (48)
- Points: Alexei Yashin (88)
- Penalty minutes: Andre Roy (169)
- Plus/minus: Radek Bonk (+27)
- Wins: Patrick Lalime (36)
- Goals against average: Patrick Lalime (2.35)

The 2000–01 Ottawa Senators season was the ninth season of the Ottawa Senators of the National Hockey League (NHL). This season saw the Senators place first in the Northeast Division, with 109 points. The Senators made the playoffs for the fifth consecutive season but they were upset in the Eastern Conference Quarterfinals by the Toronto Maple Leafs, being swept in four games.

== Regular season ==
Ottawa trailed only the Pittsburgh Penguins and New Jersey Devils with the most goals during the regular season (274).

Alexei Yashin played during the 2000–01 season, but was not restored as captain; the position remaining with Alfredsson. After the season, Yashin would be traded to the New York Islanders for Zdeno Chara, Bill Muckalt, and the Isles' first round draft pick (second overall), which the Sens used to draft Jason Spezza. Yashin would sign a ten-year contract with the Isles.

On Saturday, November 18, the Senators scored three short-handed goals in a 5–2 home win against the Florida Panthers.

=== Final standings ===
Northeast Division
No.	CR		GP	W	L	T	OTL	GF	GA	Pts
1	2	**Ottawa Senators**	82	48	21	9	4	274	205	109
2	5	**Buffalo Sabres**	82	46	30	5	1	218	184	98
3	7	**Toronto Maple Leafs**	82	37	29	11	5	232	207	90
4	9	Boston Bruins	82	36	30	8	8	227	249	88
5	11	Montreal Canadiens	82	28	40	8	6	206	232	70

Note: CR = Conference rank; GP = Games played; W = Wins; L = Losses; T = Ties; OTL=Overtime loss; GF = Goals for; GA = Goals against; Pts = Points
Bolded teams qualified for the playoffs.

Eastern Conference
R		Div	GP	W	L	T	OTL	GF	GA	Pts
**1**	**Z-** New Jersey Devils	**AT**	**82**	**48**	**19**	**12**	**3**	**295**	**195**	111
**2**	**Y-** Ottawa Senators	**NE**	**82**	**48**	**21**	**9**	**4**	**274**	**205**	109
**3**	**Y-** Washington Capitals	**SE**	**82**	**41**	**27**	**10**	**4**	**233**	**211**	96
**4**	**X-** Philadelphia Flyers	**AT**	**82**	**43**	**25**	**11**	**3**	**240**	**207**	100
**5**	**X-** Buffalo Sabres	**NE**	**82**	**46**	**30**	**5**	**1**	**218**	**184**	98
**6**	**X-** Pittsburgh Penguins	**AT**	**82**	**42**	**28**	**9**	**3**	**281**	**256**	96
**7**	**X-** Toronto Maple Leafs	**NE**	**82**	**37**	**29**	**11**	**5**	**232**	**207**	90
**8**	**X-** Carolina Hurricanes	**SE**	**82**	**38**	**32**	**9**	**3**	**212**	**225**	88
8.5
9	Boston Bruins	NE	82	36	30	8	8	227	249	88
10	New York Rangers	AT	82	33	43	5	1	250	290	72
11	Montreal Canadiens	NE	82	28	40	8	6	206	232	70
12	Florida Panthers	SE	82	22	38	13	9	200	246	66
13	Atlanta Thrashers	SE	82	23	45	12	2	211	289	60
14	Tampa Bay Lightning	SE	82	24	47	6	5	201	280	59
15	New York Islanders	AT	82	21	51	7	3	185	268	52

Divisions: AT – Atlantic, NE – Northeast, SE – Southeast

Z – Clinched conference; Y – Clinched division; X – Clinched playoff spot

== Playoffs ==
In their Eastern Conference Quarterfinals matchup with the Toronto Maple Leafs, the Senators were swept in four games with losses of 1-0 (in overtime), 2-0, 3-2 (in overtime), and 3-1. The Senators did not score a single goal in either of their two playoff games in Ottawa.

== Schedule and results ==
=== Regular season ===
2000–01 regular season
October: 7–1–3–0 (home: 3–0–2–0; road: 4–1–1–0)

Game	Date	Score	Opponent	Record	Attendance	Recap
1	October 5, 2000	4–4 OT	@ Boston Bruins (2000–01)	0–0–1–0	13,686	T
2	October 7, 2000	3–1	Dallas Stars (2000–01)	1–0–1–0	18,500	W
3	October 13, 2000	3–1	New Jersey Devils (2000–01)	2–0–1–0	16,764	W
4	October 14, 2000	4–0	@ Toronto Maple Leafs (2000–01)	3–0–1–0	19,234	W
5	October 17, 2000	6–1	@ Philadelphia Flyers (2000–01)	4–0–1–0	19,238	W
6	October 19, 2000	3–3 OT	Pittsburgh Penguins (2000–01)	4–0–2–0	17,679	T
7	October 21, 2000	6–6 OT	Atlanta Thrashers (2000–01)	4–0–3–0	14,709	T
8	October 25, 2000	3–2	@ Pittsburgh Penguins (2000–01)	5–0–3–0	15,823	W
9	October 27, 2000	6–0	@ Tampa Bay Lightning (2000–01)	6–0–3–0	15,413	W
10	October 28, 2000	1–3	@ Florida Panthers (2000–01)	6–1–3–0	14,501	L
11	October 31, 2000	4–3	Toronto Maple Leafs (2000–01)	7–1–3–0	18,500	W

November: 6–6–1–0 (home: 4–2–1–0; road: 2–4–0–0)

Game	Date	Score	Opponent	Record	Attendance	Recap
12	November 2, 2000	6–5	New York Rangers (2000–01)	8–1–3–0	16,209	W
13	November 4, 2000	2–2 OT	Columbus Blue Jackets (2000–01)	8–1–4–0	16,401	T
14	November 6, 2000	3–2	@ Atlanta Thrashers (2000–01)	9–1–4–0	12,109	W
15	November 9, 2000	1–2	@ Boston Bruins (2000–01)	9–2–4–0	13,522	L
16	November 11, 2000	3–4	@ Philadelphia Flyers (2000–01)	9–3–4–0	19,497	L
17	November 12, 2000	0–4	@ Carolina Hurricanes (2000–01)	9–4–4–0	12,003	L
18	November 16, 2000	0–1	Carolina Hurricanes (2000–01)	9–5–4–0	15,211	L
19	November 18, 2000	5–2	Florida Panthers (2000–01)	10–5–4–0	18,204	W
20	November 21, 2000	2–1	Boston Bruins (2000–01)	11–5–4–0	17,260	W
21	November 23, 2000	3–5	Edmonton Oilers (2000–01)	11–6–4–0	18,087	L
22	November 25, 2000	4–2	@ Toronto Maple Leafs (2000–01)	12–6–4–0	19,373	W
23	November 26, 2000	2–3	@ New York Rangers (2000–01)	12–7–4–0	18,200	L
24	November 28, 2000	3–1	Buffalo Sabres (2000–01)	13–7–4–0	16,390	W

December: 6–5–2–0 (home: 4–3–0–0; road: 2–2–2–0)

Game	Date	Score	Opponent	Record	Attendance	Recap
25	December 2, 2000	5–3	Philadelphia Flyers (2000–01)	14–7–4–0	18,500	W
26	December 3, 2000	2–0	@ Carolina Hurricanes (2000–01)	15–7–4–0	11,360	W
27	December 5, 2000	2–4	Pittsburgh Penguins (2000–01)	15–8–4–0	17,422	L
28	December 8, 2000	1–0	Montreal Canadiens (2000–01)	16–8–4–0	18,500	W
29	December 9, 2000	4–2	@ Montreal Canadiens (2000–01)	17–8–4–0	20,448	W
30	December 14, 2000	4–2	Calgary Flames (2000–01)	18–8–4–0	16,060	W
31	December 16, 2000	6–0	New York Islanders (2000–01)	19–8–4–0	17,359	W
32	December 20, 2000	2–2 OT	@ Minnesota Wild (2000–01)	19–8–5–0	18,064	T
33	December 21, 2000	3–3 OT	@ Columbus Blue Jackets (2000–01)	19–8–6–0	18,136	T
34	December 23, 2000	2–3	Chicago Blackhawks (2000–01)	19–9–6–0	18,279	L
35	December 27, 2000	1–5	Washington Capitals (2000–01)	19–10–6–0	17,469	L
36	December 29, 2000	0–2	@ Buffalo Sabres (2000–01)	19–11–6–0	18,690	L
37	December 30, 2000	3–5	@ Pittsburgh Penguins (2000–01)	19–12–6–0	17,148	L

January: 10–2–1–1 (home: 5–0–0–1; road: 5–2–1–0)

Game	Date	Score	Opponent	Record	Attendance	Recap
38	January 2, 2001	3–1	St. Louis Blues (2000–01)	20–12–6–0	18,119	W
39	January 4, 2001	8–3	Tampa Bay Lightning (2000–01)	21–12–6–0	17,026	W
40	January 6, 2001	4–3	Montreal Canadiens (2000–01)	22–12–6–0	18,500	W
41	January 10, 2001	5–1	@ Vancouver Canucks (2000–01)	23–12–6–0	18,422	W
42	January 13, 2001	5–2	@ Calgary Flames (2000–01)	24–12–6–0	17,139	W
43	January 14, 2001	1–4	@ Edmonton Oilers (2000–01)	24–13–6–0	16,362	L
44	January 16, 2001	6–7 OT	Los Angeles Kings (2000–01)	24–13–6–1	18,264	OTL
45	January 18, 2001	5–4	Washington Capitals (2000–01)	25–13–6–1	17,826	W
46	January 20, 2001	3–0	Tampa Bay Lightning (2000–01)	26–13–6–1	18,211	W
47	January 23, 2001	3–2	@ New York Islanders (2000–01)	27–13–6–1	10,893	W
48	January 25, 2001	5–2	@ Tampa Bay Lightning (2000–01)	28–13–6–1	13,389	W
49	January 26, 2001	5–4 OT	@ Florida Panthers (2000–01)	29–13–6–1	12,958	W
50	January 28, 2001	1–4	@ Montreal Canadiens (2000–01)	29–14–6–1	20,021	L
51	January 30, 2001	1–1 OT	@ Washington Capitals (2000–01)	29–14–7–1	14,049	T

February: 7–3–1–1 (home: 5–1–1–1; road: 2–2–0–0)

Game	Date	Score	Opponent	Record	Attendance	Recap
52	February 6, 2001	2–4	@ Detroit Red Wings (2000–01)	29–15–7–1	19,995	L
53	February 8, 2001	4–4 OT	New Jersey Devils (2000–01)	29–15–8–1	18,500	T
54	February 10, 2001	1–2 OT	Buffalo Sabres (2000–01)	29–15–8–2	18,500	OTL
55	February 12, 2001	3–1	New York Islanders (2000–01)	30–15–8–2	18,500	W
56	February 14, 2001	3–2	@ New Jersey Devils (2000–01)	31–15–8–2	16,291	W
57	February 15, 2001	4–1	Colorado Avalanche (2000–01)	32–15–8–2	18,500	W
58	February 18, 2001	4–0	Montreal Canadiens (2000–01)	33–15–8–2	18,500	W
59	February 19, 2001	0–2	@ Buffalo Sabres (2000–01)	33–16–8–2	18,690	L
60	February 22, 2001	4–2	Florida Panthers (2000–01)	34–16–8–2	18,500	W
61	February 24, 2001	3–0	Vancouver Canucks (2000–01)	35–16–8–2	18,500	W
62	February 26, 2001	3–2	@ New York Rangers (2000–01)	36–16–8–2	18,200	W
63	February 27, 2001	1–4	Buffalo Sabres (2000–01)	36–17–8–2	17,178	L

March: 10–3–1–1 (home: 4–1–1–0; road: 6–2–0–1)

Game	Date	Score	Opponent	Record	Attendance	Recap
64	March 1, 2001	8–4	San Jose Sharks (2000–01)	37–17–8–2	18,146	W
65	March 3, 2001	3–2 OT	@ Toronto Maple Leafs (2000–01)	38–17–8–2	19,367	W
66	March 6, 2001	2–3 OT	@ New Jersey Devils (2000–01)	38–17–8–3	13,456	OTL
67	March 8, 2001	5–3	@ Boston Bruins (2000–01)	39–17–8–3	14,663	W
68	March 10, 2001	2–3	New York Rangers (2000–01)	39–18–8–3	18,500	L
69	March 11, 2001	5–6	@ Washington Capitals (2000–01)	39–19–8–3	18,672	L
70	March 14, 2001	8–1	Atlanta Thrashers (2000–01)	40–19–8–3	18,242	W
71	March 16, 2001	4–1	Mighty Ducks of Anaheim (2000–01)	41–19–8–3	18,500	W
72	March 18, 2001	1–5	@ Dallas Stars (2000–01)	41–20–8–3	17,001	L
73	March 21, 2001	5–2	@ Phoenix Coyotes (2000–01)	42–20–8–3	13,872	W
74	March 22, 2001	2–1	@ San Jose Sharks (2000–01)	43–20–8–3	17,496	W
75	March 24, 2001	4–0	@ Nashville Predators (2000–01)	44–20–8–3	17,113	W
76	March 26, 2001	3–3 OT	Philadelphia Flyers (2000–01)	44–20–9–3	18,500	T
77	March 28, 2001	5–2	@ Chicago Blackhawks (2000–01)	45–20–9–3	13,045	W
78	March 30, 2001	5–4 OT	Boston Bruins (2000–01)	46–20–9–3	18,500	W

April: 2–1–0–1 (home: 1–0–0–1; road: 1–1–0–0)

Game	Date	Score	Opponent	Record	Attendance	Recap
79	April 1, 2001	2–3 OT	Carolina Hurricanes (2000–01)	46–20–9–4	18,500	OTL
80	April 3, 2001	2–5	@ Atlanta Thrashers (2000–01)	46–21–9–4	17,440	L
81	April 6, 2001	4–3	@ New York Islanders (2000–01)	47–21–9–4	13,822	W
82	April 7, 2001	5–3	Toronto Maple Leafs (2000–01)	48–21–9–4	18,500	W

Legend: W Win (2 points) L Loss (0 points) T Tie (1 point) OTL Overtime loss (1 point)

=== Playoffs ===
2001 Stanley Cup playoffs
Eastern Conference Quarterfinals vs. (7) Toronto Maple Leafs – Maple Leafs win 4–0

Game	Date	Score	Opponent	Series	Attendance	Recap
1	April 13, 2001	0–1 OT	Toronto Maple Leafs	Maple Leafs lead 1–0	18,500	L
2	April 14, 2001	0–3	Toronto Maple Leafs	Maple Leafs lead 2–0	18,500	L
3	April 16, 2001	2–3 OT	@ Toronto Maple Leafs	Maple Leafs lead 3–0	19,404	L
4	April 18, 2001	1–3	@ Toronto Maple Leafs	Maple Leafs win 4–0	19,445	L

Legend: W Win L Loss

== Player statistics ==
=== Scoring ===
- Position abbreviations: C = Centre; D = Defence; G = Goaltender; LW = Left wing; RW = Right wing
- † = Joined team via a transaction (e.g., trade, waivers, signing) during the season. Stats reflect time with the Senators only.
- ‡ = Left team via a transaction (e.g., trade, waivers, release) during the season. Stats reflect time with the Senators only.

No.	Player	Pos	Regular season						Playoffs					
No.	Player	Pos	GP	G	A	Pts	+/-	PIM	GP	G	A	Pts	+/-	PIM
19	Alexei Yashin	C	82	40	48	88	10	30	4	0	1	1	1	0
18	Marian Hossa	RW	81	32	43	75	19	44	4	1	1	2	1	4
15	Shawn McEachern	LW	82	32	40	72	10	62	4	0	2	2	1	2
11	Daniel Alfredsson	RW	68	24	46	70	11	30	4	1	0	1	0	2
14	Radek Bonk	C	74	23	36	59	27	52	2	0	0	0	−1	2
6	Wade Redden	D	78	10	37	47	22	49	4	0	0	0	−3	0
9	Martin Havlat	RW	73	19	23	42	8	20	4	0	0	0	−4	2
7	Rob Zamuner	LW	79	19	18	37	7	52	4	0	0	0	−5	6
20	Magnus Arvedson	LW	51	17	16	33	23	24	2	0	0	0	0	0
23	Karel Rachunek	D	71	3	30	33	17	60	3	0	0	0	−4	0
10	Andreas Dackell	RW	81	13	18	31	7	24	4	0	0	0	0	0
33	Jason York	D	74	6	16	22	7	72	4	0	0	0	1	4
12	Mike Fisher	C	60	7	12	19	−1	46	4	0	1	1	−1	4
5	Sami Salo	D	31	2	16	18	9	10	4	0	0	0	0	0
4	Chris Phillips	D	73	2	12	14	8	31	1	1	0	1	0	0
13	Vaclav Prospal‡	C	40	1	12	13	1	12	—	—	—	—	—	—
27	Ricard Persson	D	33	1	8	9	8	35	2	0	0	0	0	0
26	Andre Roy	RW	64	3	5	8	1	169	2	0	0	0	0	16
16	Mike Sillinger†	C	13	3	4	7	1	4	4	0	0	0	−3	2
22	Jamie Rivers†	D	45	2	4	6	6	44	1	0	0	0	0	4
29	Igor Kravchuk‡	D	15	1	5	6	4	14	—	—	—	—	—	—
28	Todd White	C	16	4	1	5	5	4	2	0	0	0	0	0
34	Shane Hnidy	D	52	3	2	5	8	84	1	0	0	0	−1	0
16	Petr Schastlivy	LW	17	3	2	5	−1	6	—	—	—	—	—	—
2	Curtis Leschyshyn†	D	11	0	4	4	7	0	4	0	0	0	−1	0
48	Ivan Ciernik	RW	4	2	0	2	2	2	—	—	—	—	—	—
38	John Emmons‡	C	41	1	1	2	−5	20	—	—	—	—	—	—
36	Joel Kwiatkowski	D	4	1	0	1	1	0	—	—	—	—	—	—
17	Colin Forbes‡	C	39	0	1	1	−3	31	—	—	—	—	—	—
17	Eric Lacroix†	LW	9	0	1	1	0	4	4	0	1	1	0	0
40	Patrick Lalime	G	60	0	1	1		2	4	0	0	0		0
30	Mike Fountain	G	1	0	0	0		0	—	—	—	—	—	—
3	Sean Gagnon	D	5	0	0	0	0	13	—	—	—	—	—	—
35	Jani Hurme	G	22	0	0	0		0	—	—	—	—	—	—
21	David Oliver	RW	7	0	0	0	0	2	—	—	—	—	—	—

=== Goaltending ===
No.	Player	Regular season										Playoffs								
No.	Player	GP	W	L	T	SA	GA	GAA	SV%	SO	TOI	GP	W	L	SA	GA	GAA	SV%	SO	TOI
40	Patrick Lalime	60	36	19	5	1640	141	2.35	.914	7	3607	4	0	4	99	10	2.39	.899	0	251
35	Jani Hurme	22	12	5	4	563	54	2.50	.904	2	1296	—	—	—	—	—	—	—	—	—
30	Mike Fountain	1	0	1	0	25	3	3.05	.880	0	59	—	—	—	—	—	—	—	—	—

== Awards and records ==
=== Awards ===
Type	Award/honour	Recipient	Ref
League (annual)	NHL All-Rookie Team	Martin Havlat (Forward)	
League (in-season)	NHL All-Star Game selection	Radek Bonk	
League (in-season)	NHL All-Star Game selection	Marian Hossa	
League (in-season)	NHL All-Star Game selection	Jacques Martin (coach)	
League (in-season)	NHL Player of the Week	Patrick Lalime (December 4)	
League (in-season)	NHL Player of the Week	Patrick Lalime (February 19)	
League (in-season)	NHL Rookie of the Month	Karel Rachunek (January)	
League (in-season)	NHL Rookie of the Month	Martin Havlat (March)	
Team	Molson Cup	Patrick Lalime	

=== Milestones ===
Milestone	Player	Date	Ref
First game	Martin Havlat	October 5, 2000	
First game	Shane Hnidy	October 5, 2000	
First game	Joel Kwiatkowski	February 19, 2001	

== Transactions ==
The Senators were involved in the following transactions from June 11, 2000, the day after the deciding game of the 2000 Stanley Cup Final, through June 9, 2001, the day of the deciding game of the 2001 Stanley Cup Final.

=== Trades ===
Date	Details		Ref
June 12, 2000	To Anaheim Mighty Ducks: Patrick Traverse	To Ottawa Senators: Joel Kwiatkowski	
June 25, 2000	To Los Angeles Kings: 4th-round pick in 2000	To Ottawa Senators: 5th-round pick in 2000; 5th-round pick in 2000	
June 25, 2000	To Detroit Red Wings: 8th-round pick 2000	To Ottawa Senators: Shane Hnidy	
January 21, 2001	To Florida Panthers: Vaclav Prospal	To Ottawa Senators: Choice of a 3rd or 4th-round pick (Note: The Panthers had the choice of sending Ottawa a fourth-round pick in 2001 or a third-round pick in 2002. This draft pick was ultimately traded back to Florida on March 13 for Mike Sillinger.)	
March 1, 2001	To New York Rangers: Colin Forbes	To Ottawa Senators: Eric Lacroix	
March 13, 2001	To Tampa Bay Lightning: John Emmons	To Ottawa Senators: Craig Millar	
March 13, 2001	To Minnesota Wild: 3rd-round pick in 2001	To Ottawa Senators: Curtis Leschyshyn	
March 13, 2001	To Florida Panthers: Returned draft options	To Ottawa Senators: Mike Sillinger	

=== Players acquired ===
Date	Player	Former team	Term	Via	Ref
July 7, 2000	Sean Gagnon	Phoenix Coyotes	multi-year	Free agency	
July 12, 2000	Ricard Persson	St. Louis Blues	multi-year	Free agency	
July 12, 2000	Todd White	Philadelphia Flyers	multi-year	Free agency	
August 2, 2000	David Oliver	Phoenix Coyotes	multi-year	Free agency	
August 10, 2000	Derek King	St. Louis Blues	multi-year	Free agency	
November 10, 2000	Jamie Rivers	Grand Rapids Griffins (AHL)	multi-year	Free agency	

=== Players lost ===
Date	Player	New team	Via (Note: In parentheses is the player's free agency group on July 1 if applicable.)	Ref
N/A	Erich Goldmann	Essen Mosquitoes (DEL)	Free agency (UFA)	
June 23, 2000	Kevin Dineen	Columbus Blue Jackets	Expansion draft	
June 23, 2000	Joe Juneau	Minnesota Wild	Expansion draft	
July 1, 2000	Tom Barrasso (Note: Barrasso was inactive during the 2000–01 season.)		Contract expiration (III)	
July 12, 2000	Shaun Van Allen	Dallas Stars	Free agency (III)	
July 20, 2000	Yves Sarault	Atlanta Thrashers	Free agency (UFA)	
July 26, 2000	Kevin Miller	HC Davos (NLA)	Free agency (III)	
August 22, 2000	David Van Drunen	Mobile Mysticks (ECHL)	Free agency (UFA)	
August 23, 2000	Jeff Shevalier	Phoenix Mustangs (WCHL)	Free agency (VI)	
September 19, 2000	Rich Parent	Pittsburgh Penguins	Free agency	
November 10, 2000	Igor Kravchuk	Calgary Flames	Waivers	
February 1, 2001	Grant Ledyard	Tampa Bay Lightning	Free agency (III)	

=== Signings ===
Date	Player	Term	Contract type	Ref
July 5, 2000	Mathieu Chouinard	multi-year	Entry-level	
July 6, 2000	Martin Havlat	multi-year	Entry-level	
July 28, 2000	John Gruden	multi-year	Re-signing	
August 1, 2000	Magnus Arvedson	1-year	Re-signing	
August 1, 2000	Ivan Ciernik	1-year	Re-signing	
August 1, 2000	John Emmons	multi-year	Re-signing	
August 1, 2000	Shane Hnidy	1-year	Re-signing	
August 1, 2000	Chris Phillips	1-year	Re-signing	
August 10, 2000	Jason York	1-year	Re-signing	
August 18, 2000	Radek Bonk	multi-year	Arbitration award	
October 1, 2000	Andreas Dackell	multi-year	Re-signing	
December 5, 2000	Alexandre Giroux	multi-year	Entry-level	
December 7, 2000	Jani Hurme	multi-year	Extension	
February 20, 2001	Shane Hnidy	multi-year	Extension	
April 20, 2001	Ricard Persson	1-year	Option exercised	
April 20, 2001	Jamie Rivers	1-year	Option exercised	
April 20, 2001	Todd White	1-year	Option exercised	
June 1, 2001	Simon Lajeunesse	multi-year	Entry-level	
June 2, 2001	Chris Kelly	multi-year	Entry-level	

== Draft picks ==
Ottawa's draft picks from the 2000 NHL entry draft held on June 24 and June 25, 2000 at the Saddledome in Calgary, Alberta.

Round	#	Player	Nationality	College/Junior/Club team (League)
1	21	Anton Volchenkov	Russia	Krylya Sovetov (Vysshaya Liga (Russia))
2	45	Mathieu Chouinard	Canada	Shawinigan Cataractes (QMJHL)
2	55	Antoine Vermette	Canada	Victoriaville Tigres (QMJHL)
3	87	Jan Bohac	Czech Republic	Slavia Praha (Czech Extraliga)
4	122	Derrick Byfuglien	United States	Fargo-Moorhead Ice Sharks (USHL)
5	156	Greg Zanon	Canada	University of Nebraska Omaha (NCHC)
5	157	Grant Potulny	United States	Lincoln Stars (USHL)
5	158	Sean Connolly	United States	Northern Michigan University (WCHA)
6	188	Jason Maleyko	Canada	Brampton Battalion (OHL)
9	283	James DeMone	Canada	Portland Winter Hawks (WHL)

== Farm teams ==
=== Grand Rapids Griffins ===
Bruce Cassidy was named head coach of the Grand Rapids Griffins for the 2000–01 season with the Senators top affiliate.

The Griffins finished with the top record in the league, winning the Fred A. Huber Trophy, as the club posted a record of 53–22–7, earning 113 points and first place in the Eastern Conference. In the post-season, the Griffins defeated the Cleveland Lumberjacks before losing to the Orlando Solar Bears in the Eastern Conference finals.

Derek King tied for the league lead with 83 points, as he was a co-winner of the Leo P. Lamoureux Memorial Trophy awarded to the leading scorer of the IHL. Vyacheslav Butsayev led the Griffins with 33 goals while Chris Neil finished second in the league with 354 penalty minutes. Mike Fountain had a record of 34–10–6 with a 2.08 GAA and a .924 save percentage. His 34 victories led the IHL. In the post-season, David Oliver led the Griffins with six goals and Kip Miller had a team high 13 points.

=== Mobile Mysticks ===
The Mobile Mysticks were coached by Jeff Pyle in the 2000–01 season.

The Mysticks completed the season in third place in the Southwest Division with a record of 38–28–6, earning 82 points. In the post-season, Mobile defeated the Jackson Bandits before losing to the South Carolina Stingrays in the Southern Conference semi-finals.

Mark Turner scored a team high 36 goals, while Turner and Jason Elders co-led the club with 77 points. Chris Wickenheiser led the club with 13 victories and Maxime Gingras had a team best 2.32 GAA. In the post-season, both Turner and Elders co-led the Mysticks with 11 points. Hugues Gervais scored a team high seven goals.

== See also ==
- 2000–01 NHL season
