= 2000–01 Tampa Bay Lightning season =

National Hockey League team season

2000–01 Tampa Bay Lightning
- Division: 5th Southeast
- Conference: 14th Eastern
- 2000–01 record: 24–47–6–5
- Home record: 17–19–3–2
- Road record: 7–28–3–3
- Goals for: 201
- Goals against: 280

Team information
- General manager: Rick Dudley
- Coach: Steve Ludzik (Oct.–Jan.); John Tortorella (Jan.–Apr.)
- Captain: Vincent Lecavalier
- Arena: Ice Palace
- Average attendance: 14,906
- Minor league affiliates: Detroit Vipers; Johnstown Chiefs

Team leaders
- Goals: Fredrik Modin (32)
- Assists: Brad Richards (41)
- Points: Brad Richards (62)
- Penalty minutes: Cory Sarich (106)
- Plus/minus: Dmitri Afanasenkov (+1)
- Wins: Kevin Weekes (20)
- Goals against average: Kevin Weekes (3.14)

The 2000–01 Tampa Bay Lightning season was the Lightning's ninth season of operation. The club again failed to make the playoffs for the fifth consecutive season for the first time in franchise history.

== Regular season ==
After 39 games, the Lightning fired coach Steve Ludzik and replaced him with John Tortorella. Ludzik finished with a record of 12–20–5–2 for the season. Tortorella would have a slightly worse record the rest of the way, finishing 12–27–1–3.

=== Final standings ===
Southeast Division
No.	CR		GP	W	L	T	OTL	GF	GA	Pts
1	3	**Washington Capitals**	82	41	27	10	4	233	211	96
2	8	**Carolina Hurricanes**	82	38	32	9	3	212	225	88
3	12	Florida Panthers	82	22	38	13	9	200	246	66
4	13	Atlanta Thrashers	82	23	45	12	2	211	289	60
5	14	Tampa Bay Lightning	82	24	47	6	5	201	280	59

Note: CR = Conference rank; GP = Games played; W = Wins; L = Losses; T = Ties; OTL = Overtime loss; GF = Goals for; GA = Goals against; Pts = Points
Bolded teams qualified for the playoffs.

Eastern Conference
R		Div	GP	W	L	T	OTL	GF	GA	Pts
**1**	**Z-** New Jersey Devils	**AT**	**82**	**48**	**19**	**12**	**3**	**295**	**195**	111
**2**	**Y-** Ottawa Senators	**NE**	**82**	**48**	**21**	**9**	**4**	**274**	**205**	109
**3**	**Y-** Washington Capitals	**SE**	**82**	**41**	**27**	**10**	**4**	**233**	**211**	96
**4**	**X-** Philadelphia Flyers	**AT**	**82**	**43**	**25**	**11**	**3**	**240**	**207**	100
**5**	**X-** Buffalo Sabres	**NE**	**82**	**46**	**30**	**5**	**1**	**218**	**184**	98
**6**	**X-** Pittsburgh Penguins	**AT**	**82**	**42**	**28**	**9**	**3**	**281**	**256**	96
**7**	**X-** Toronto Maple Leafs	**NE**	**82**	**37**	**29**	**11**	**5**	**232**	**207**	90
**8**	**X-** Carolina Hurricanes	**SE**	**82**	**38**	**32**	**9**	**3**	**212**	**225**	88
8.5
9	Boston Bruins	NE	82	36	30	8	8	227	249	88
10	New York Rangers	AT	82	33	43	5	1	250	290	72
11	Montreal Canadiens	NE	82	28	40	8	6	206	232	70
12	Florida Panthers	SE	82	22	38	13	9	200	246	66
13	Atlanta Thrashers	SE	82	23	45	12	2	211	289	60
14	Tampa Bay Lightning	SE	82	24	47	6	5	201	280	59
15	New York Islanders	AT	82	21	51	7	3	185	268	52

Divisions: AT – Atlantic, NE – Northeast, SE – Southeast

Z – Clinched conference; Y – Clinched division; X – Clinched playoff spot

== Schedule and results ==
2000–01 regular season
October: 2–6–1–1 (home: 1–2–1–0; road: 1–4–0–1)

Game	Date	Score	Opponent	Record	Recap
1	October 6, 2000	3–3 OT	New York Islanders (2000–01)	0–0–1–0	T
2	October 8, 2000	4–5	Vancouver Canucks (2000–01)	0–1–1–0	L
3	October 13, 2000	2–3	@ Pittsburgh Penguins (2000–01)	0–2–1–0	L
4	October 15, 2000	5–2	Atlanta Thrashers (2000–01)	1–2–1–0	W
5	October 18, 2000	5–6	@ Minnesota Wild (2000–01)	1–3–1–0	L
6	October 21, 2000	2–7	@ New Jersey Devils (2000–01)	1–4–1–0	L
7	October 22, 2000	4–2	@ New York Rangers (2000–01)	2–4–1–0	W
8	October 25, 2000	1–5	@ Detroit Red Wings (2000–01)	2–5–1–0	L
9	October 27, 2000	0–6	Ottawa Senators (2000–01)	2–6–1–0	L
10	October 31, 2000	5–6 OT	@ Carolina Hurricanes (2000–01)	2–6–1–1	OTL

November: 6–5–1–1 (home: 5–1–0–0; road: 1–4–1–1)

Game	Date	Score	Opponent	Record	Recap
11	November 1, 2000	1–6	@ New York Rangers (2000–01)	2–7–1–1	L
12	November 3, 2000	4–3 OT	New York Islanders (2000–01)	3–7–1–1	W
13	November 5, 2000	5–2	Washington Capitals (2000–01)	4–7–1–1	W
14	November 10, 2000	3–1	Montreal Canadiens (2000–01)	5–7–1–1	W
15	November 11, 2000	3–4	Calgary Flames (2000–01)	5–8–1–1	L
16	November 14, 2000	1–0	@ Montreal Canadiens (2000–01)	6–8–1–1	W
17	November 17, 2000	2–2 OT	@ Toronto Maple Leafs (2000–01)	6–8–2–1	T
18	November 20, 2000	2–6	@ Dallas Stars (2000–01)	6–9–2–1	L
19	November 22, 2000	8–2	Atlanta Thrashers (2000–01)	7–9–2–1	W
20	November 24, 2000	2–1	Florida Panthers (2000–01)	8–9–2–1	W
21	November 25, 2000	1–2 OT	@ Florida Panthers (2000–01)	8–9–2–2	OTL
22	November 27, 2000	4–7	@ New York Islanders (2000–01)	8–10–2–2	L
23	November 29, 2000	1–4	@ Washington Capitals (2000–01)	8–11–2–2	L

December: 4–7–3–0 (home: 3–3–2–0; road: 1–4–1–0)

Game	Date	Score	Opponent	Record	Recap
24	December 1, 2000	3–5	@ Atlanta Thrashers (2000–01)	8–12–2–2	L
25	December 2, 2000	3–0	Detroit Red Wings (2000–01)	9–12–2–2	W
26	December 6, 2000	3–6	@ Philadelphia Flyers (2000–01)	9–13–2–2	L
27	December 8, 2000	0–2	Colorado Avalanche (2000–01)	9–14–2–2	L
28	December 11, 2000	2–2 OT	@ Colorado Avalanche (2000–01)	9–14–3–2	T
29	December 14, 2000	2–3	@ Phoenix Coyotes (2000–01)	9–15–3–2	L
30	December 16, 2000	4–3	@ Los Angeles Kings (2000–01)	10–15–3–2	W
31	December 17, 2000	1–3	@ Mighty Ducks of Anaheim (2000–01)	10–16–3–2	L
32	December 21, 2000	1–1 OT	Pittsburgh Penguins (2000–01)	10–16–4–2	T
33	December 23, 2000	1–5	New Jersey Devils (2000–01)	10–17–4–2	L
34	December 26, 2000	3–2	Carolina Hurricanes (2000–01)	11–17–4–2	W
35	December 28, 2000	4–3	Philadelphia Flyers (2000–01)	12–17–4–2	W
36	December 30, 2000	1–1 OT	Boston Bruins (2000–01)	12–17–5–2	T
37	December 31, 2000	2–3	Toronto Maple Leafs (2000–01)	12–18–5–2	L

January: 2–12–0–1 (home: 1–4–0–0; road: 1–8–0–1)

Game	Date	Score	Opponent	Record	Recap
38	January 3, 2001	2–3	@ Carolina Hurricanes (2000–01)	12–19–5–2	L
39	January 4, 2001	3–8	@ Ottawa Senators (2000–01)	12–20–5–2	L
40	January 7, 2001	4–7	@ Chicago Blackhawks (2000–01)	12–21–5–2	L
41	January 10, 2001	3–1	@ Toronto Maple Leafs (2000–01)	13–21–5–2	W
42	January 12, 2001	0–3	Philadelphia Flyers (2000–01)	13–22–5–2	L
43	January 14, 2001	2–3	Dallas Stars (2000–01)	13–23–5–2	L
44	January 16, 2001	1–3	@ Buffalo Sabres (2000–01)	13–24–5–2	L
45	January 18, 2001	1–3	@ Montreal Canadiens (2000–01)	13–25–5–2	L
46	January 20, 2001	0–3	@ Ottawa Senators (2000–01)	13–26–5–2	L
47	January 21, 2001	1–3	@ Columbus Blue Jackets (2000–01)	13–27–5–2	L
48	January 23, 2001	2–5	Washington Capitals (2000–01)	13–28–5–2	L
49	January 25, 2001	2–5	Ottawa Senators (2000–01)	13–29–5–2	L
50	January 27, 2001	2–3 OT	@ Florida Panthers (2000–01)	13–29–5–3	OTL
51	January 29, 2001	2–5	@ Carolina Hurricanes (2000–01)	13–30–5–3	L
52	January 30, 2001	4–3	Florida Panthers (2000–01)	14–30–5–3	W

February: 2–8–1–0 (home: 2–4–0–0; road: 0–4–1–0)

Game	Date	Score	Opponent	Record	Recap
53	February 1, 2001	4–2	Buffalo Sabres (2000–01)	15–30–5–3	W
54	February 6, 2001	2–4	Minnesota Wild (2000–01)	15–31–5–3	L
55	February 8, 2001	1–4	@ St. Louis Blues (2000–01)	15–32–5–3	L
56	February 10, 2001	2–6	@ Boston Bruins (2000–01)	15–33–5–3	L
57	February 13, 2001	2–5	Phoenix Coyotes (2000–01)	15–34–5–3	L
58	February 15, 2001	3–6	Boston Bruins (2000–01)	15–35–5–3	L
59	February 17, 2001	4–5	New York Rangers (2000–01)	15–36–5–3	L
60	February 18, 2001	2–3	@ Nashville Predators (2000–01)	15–37–5–3	L
61	February 20, 2001	3–2	St. Louis Blues (2000–01)	16–37–5–3	W
62	February 24, 2001	0–0 OT	@ Philadelphia Flyers (2000–01)	16–37–6–3	T
63	February 25, 2001	4–5	@ Buffalo Sabres (2000–01)	16–38–6–3	L

March: 8–6–0–1 (home: 5–4–0–1; road: 3–2–0–0)

Game	Date	Score	Opponent	Record	Recap
64	March 1, 2001	1–3	@ Boston Bruins (2000–01)	16–39–6–3	L
65	March 3, 2001	6–0	@ New York Islanders (2000–01)	17–39–6–3	W
66	March 4, 2001	0–6	@ New Jersey Devils (2000–01)	17–40–6–3	L
67	March 6, 2001	2–1 OT	San Jose Sharks (2000–01)	18–40–6–3	W
68	March 8, 2001	1–0	Carolina Hurricanes (2000–01)	19–40–6–3	W
69	March 10, 2001	4–1	Columbus Blue Jackets (2000–01)	20–40–6–3	W
70	March 13, 2001	4–5 OT	Edmonton Oilers (2000–01)	20–40–6–4	OTL
71	March 15, 2001	3–2	Toronto Maple Leafs (2000–01)	21–40–6–4	W
72	March 17, 2001	5–1	Pittsburgh Penguins (2000–01)	22–40–6–4	W
73	March 21, 2001	4–3	@ Atlanta Thrashers (2000–01)	23–40–6–4	W
74	March 22, 2001	0–2	Atlanta Thrashers (2000–01)	23–41–6–4	L
75	March 24, 2001	2–3	Washington Capitals (2000–01)	23–42–6–4	L
76	March 27, 2001	1–7	New Jersey Devils (2000–01)	23–43–6–4	L
77	March 29, 2001	2–6	Montreal Canadiens (2000–01)	23–44–6–4	L
78	March 30, 2001	4–2	@ Florida Panthers (2000–01)	24–44–6–4	W

April: 0–3–0–1 (home: 0–1–0–1; road: 0–2–0–0)

Game	Date	Score	Opponent	Record	Recap
79	April 1, 2001	2–4	Buffalo Sabres (2000–01)	24–45–6–4	L
80	April 4, 2001	2–4	@ Pittsburgh Penguins (2000–01)	24–46–6–4	L
81	April 5, 2001	3–4 OT	New York Rangers (2000–01)	24–46–6–5	OTL
82	April 8, 2001	1–2	@ Washington Capitals (2000–01)	24–47–6–5	L

Legend: W Win (2 points) L Loss (0 points) T Tie (1 point) OTL Overtime loss (1 point)

== Player statistics ==
=== Scoring ===
- Position abbreviations: C = Center; D = Defense; G = Goaltender; LW = Left wing; RW = Right wing
- † = Joined team via a transaction (e.g., trade, waivers, signing) during the season. Stats reflect time with the Lightning only.
- ‡ = Left team via a transaction (e.g., trade, waivers, release) during the season. Stats reflect time with the Lightning only.

No.	Player	Pos	Regular season					
No.	Player	Pos	GP	G	A	Pts	+/-	PIM
19	Brad Richards	C	82	21	41	62	−10	14
33	Fredrik Modin	LW	76	32	24	56	−1	48
4	Vincent Lecavalier	C	68	23	28	51	−26	66
26	Martin St. Louis	RW	78	18	22	40	−4	12
10	Mike Johnson‡	RW	64	11	27	38	−10	38
9	Brian Holzinger	C	70	11	25	36	−9	64
13	Pavel Kubina	D	70	11	19	30	−14	103
14 (Note: Kharitonov wore number 36 until Barnaby was acquired.)	Alexander Kharitonov	LW	66	7	15	22	−9	8
8	Todd Warriner	LW	64	10	11	21	−13	46
17	Ryan Johnson	C	80	7	14	21	−20	44
28	Nils Ekman	LW	43	9	11	20	−15	40
30	Andrei Zyuzin	D	64	4	16	20	−8	76
2	Paul Mara‡	D	46	6	10	16	−17	40
22	Wayne Primeau‡	C	47	2	13	15	−17	77
6	Adrian Aucoin†	D	26	1	11	12	−8	25
21	Cory Sarich	D	73	1	8	9	−25	106
36	Matthew Barnaby†	RW	29	4	4	8	−3	97
5	Jassen Cullimore	D	74	1	6	7	−6	80
7	Ben Clymer	RW	23	5	1	6	−7	21
20	Stan Drulia	RW	34	2	4	6	−11	18
41	Maxim Galanov†‡	D	25	0	5	5	−5	8
27 (Note: Keefe wore number 46 through January 12.)	Sheldon Keefe	RW	49	4	0	4	−13	38
57	Kristian Kudroc	D	22	2	2	4	0	36
3	Grant Ledyard†‡	D	14	2	2	4	−5	12
23	Petr Svoboda	D	19	1	3	4	−4	41
6	Bryan Muir‡	D	10	0	3	3	−7	15
37	Dmitry Afanasenkov	LW	9	1	1	2	1	4
62	Kaspars Astashenko	D	15	1	1	2	−4	4
10	John Emmons†	C	12	1	1	2	0	22
27	Steve Martins‡	C	20	1	1	2	−9	13
32 (Note: Millar wore number 44 in his first twelve games.)	Craig Millar†‡	D	16	1	1	2	−8	10
2	Stan Neckar†	D	16	0	2	2	−1	8
11	Sergey Gusev	D	16	1	0	1	−3	10
34	Gordie Dwyer	LW	28	0	1	1	−7	96
24	Kyle Freadrich	LW	13	0	1	1	−1	36
80	Kevin Weekes	G	61	0	1	1		4
39	Dan Cloutier‡	G	24	0	0	0		4
73	Matt Elich	RW	8	0	0	0	−5	0
31	Wade Flaherty†	G	2	0	0	0		0
35	Nikolai Khabibulin†	G	2	0	0	0		0
35	Dieter Kochan	G	10	0	0	0		0
1	Evgeny Konstantinov	G	1	0	0	0		0
18	Marek Posmyk	D	1	0	0	0	−1	0
43	Thomas Ziegler	RW	5	0	0	0	−2	0

=== Goaltending ===
- † = Joined team via a transaction (e.g., trade, waivers, signing) during the season. Stats reflect time with the Lightning only.
- ‡ = Left team via a transaction (e.g., trade, waivers, release) during the season. Stats reflect time with the Lightning only.

No.	Player	Regular season									
No.	Player	GP	W	L	T	SA	GA	GAA	SV%	SO	TOI
80	Kevin Weekes	61	20	33	3	1742	177	3.15	.898	4	3378
39	Dan Cloutier‡	24	3	13	3	541	59	3.52	.891	1	1005
35	Nikolai Khabibulin†	2	1	1	0	69	6	2.92	.913	0	123
31	Wade Flaherty†	2	0	2	0	55	8	4.07	.855	0	118
35	Dieter Kochan	10	0	3	0	138	18	3.44	.870	0	314
1	Evgeny Konstantinov	1	0	0	0	0	0	0.00		0	1

== Awards and records ==
=== Awards ===
Type	Award/honor	Recipient	Ref
League (annual)	NHL All-Rookie Team	Brad Richards (Forward)	
League (in-season)	NHL All-Star Game selection	Fredrik Modin	
League (in-season)	NHL Rookie of the Month	Brad Richards (October)	

=== Milestones ===
Milestone	Player	Date	Ref
First game	Alexander Kharitonov	October 6, 2000	
First game	Brad Richards	October 6, 2000	
First game	Sheldon Keefe	October 18, 2000	
First game	Kristian Kudroc	November 27, 2000	
First game	Evgeny Konstantinov	December 8, 2000	
First game	Thomas Ziegler	February 6, 2001	
First game	Dmitri Afanasenkov	March 10, 2001	

== Transactions ==
The Lightning were involved in the following transactions from June 11, 2000, the day after the deciding game of the 2000 Stanley Cup Final, through June 9, 2001, the day of the deciding game of the 2001 Stanley Cup Final.

=== Trades ===
Date	Details		Ref
June 24, 2000	To Tampa Bay Lightning: Kevin Weekes; Rights to Kristian Kudroc; 2nd-round pick in 2001	To New York Islanders: 1st-round pick in 2000; 4th-round pick in 2000; Islanders’ 7th-round pick in 2000	
June 25, 2000	To Tampa Bay Lightning: 4th-round pick in 2000	To Philadelphia Flyers: 6th-round pick in 2000; Montreal’s 7th-round pick in 2000; Toronto’s 9th-round pick in 2000	
June 25, 2000	To Tampa Bay Lightning: 7th-round pick in 2001; 9th-round pick in 2001	To Buffalo Sabres: 7th-round pick in 2000	
June 25, 2000	To Tampa Bay Lightning: 9th-round pick in 2000	To New Jersey Devils: 8th-round pick in 2001	
January 4, 2001	To Tampa Bay Lightning: Conditional draft pick in 2001	To New York Islanders: Steve Martins	
January 23, 2001	To Tampa Bay Lightning: 8th-round pick in 2001	To Colorado Avalanche: Bryan Muir	
February 1, 2001	To Tampa Bay Lightning: Matthew Barnaby	To Pittsburgh Penguins: Wayne Primeau	
February 7, 2001	To Tampa Bay Lightning: Adrian Aucoin; 2nd-round pick in 2001	To Vancouver Canucks: Dan Cloutier	
February 16, 2001	To Tampa Bay Lightning: Wade Flaherty	To New York Islanders: Conditional draft pick	
February 20, 2001	To Tampa Bay Lightning: Konstantin Kalmikov	To Toronto Maple Leafs: Maxim Galanov	
March 5, 2001	To Tampa Bay Lightning: Stanislav Neckar; Rights to Nikolai Khabibulin	To Phoenix Coyotes: Mike Johnson; Paul Mara; Rights to Ruslan Zainullin; Islanders’ 2nd-round pick in 2001	
March 13, 2001	To Tampa Bay Lightning: 7th-round pick in 2001	To Dallas Stars: Grant Ledyard	
March 13, 2001	To Tampa Bay Lightning: John Emmons	To Ottawa Senators: Craig Millar	

=== Players acquired ===
Date	Player	Former team	Term	Via	Ref
July 31, 2000	Martin St. Louis	Calgary Flames	2-year	Free agency	
September 29, 2000	Jason Podollan	Los Angeles Kings		Waiver draft	
October 25, 2000	Craig Millar	Nashville Predators		Waivers	
November 3, 2000	Maxim Galanov	Florida Panthers		Waivers	
February 1, 2001	Grant Ledyard	Ottawa Senators	1-year	Free agency	

=== Players lost ===
Date	Player	New team	Via (Note: In parentheses is the player's free agency group on July 1 if applicable.)	Ref
N/A	Pavel Torgaev	Torpedo Nizhny Novgorod (RSL)	Free agency (VI)	
June 23, 2000	Zac Bierk	Minnesota Wild	Expansion draft	
June 23, 2000	Bruce Gardiner	Columbus Blue Jackets	Expansion draft	
July 1, 2000	Daren Puppa (Note: Puppa retired.)		Contract expiration (III)	
July 26, 2000	Shawn Burr		Retirement	
July 26, 2000	Tim Thomas	AIK IF (SHL)	Free agency (UFA)	
July 27, 2000	Robert Petrovicky	New York Islanders	Free agency (UFA)	
August 8, 2000	Xavier Delisle	Montreal Canadiens	Free agency (UFA)	
August 24, 2000	Reid Simpson	St. Louis Blues	Free agency (III)	
September 7, 2000	Andrei Skopintsev	Atlanta Thrashers	Free agency (UFA)	
October 3, 2000	Dwayne Hay	Calgary Flames	Waivers	

=== Signings ===
Date	Player	Term	Contract type	Ref
June 2000	Dan Kesa	1-year	Re-signing	
June 22, 2000	Evgeny Konstantinov	3-year	Entry-level	
June 28, 2000	Stan Drulia	1-year	Option exercised	
July 14, 2000	Alexander Kharitonov		Entry-level	
July 14, 2000	Thomas Ziegler		Entry-level	
July 17, 2000	Fredrik Modin	multi-year	Re-signing	
July 17, 2000	Todd Warriner	multi-year	Re-signing	
July 26, 2000	Dan Cloutier	1-year	Re-signing	
July 26, 2000	Dwayne Hay	1-year	Re-signing	
July 31, 2000	Brian Holzinger	1-year	Re-signing	
July 31, 2000	Steve Martins	1-year	Re-signing	
August 3, 2000	Andrei Zyuzin	1-year	Re-signing	
August 14, 2000	Ryan Johnson	1-year	Re-signing	
August 17, 2000	Kaspars Astashenko	1-year	Re-signing	
August 17, 2000	Bryan Muir	1-year	Re-signing	
August 28, 2000	Wayne Primeau	1-year	Re-signing	
August 31, 2000	Pavel Kubina	2-year	Re-signing	
September 21, 2000	Sheldon Keefe	3-year	Entry-level	
October 2, 2000	Kristian Kudroc	3-year	Entry-level	
March 17, 2001	Nikolai Khabibulin	multi-year	Re-signing	
April 24, 2001	Nikita Alexeev	3-year	Entry-level	
May 7, 2001	Jassen Cullimore	multi-year	Extension	
May 30, 2001	Matthew Barnaby	3-year	Extension	

== Draft picks ==
Tampa Bay's draft picks at the 2000 NHL entry draft held at the Pengrowth Saddledome in Calgary, Alberta.

Round	#	Player	Nationality	College/Junior/Club team (League)
1	8	Nikita Alexeev	Russia	Erie Otters (OHL)
2	34	Ruslan Zainullin	Russia	Ak Bars Kazan (Russia)
3	81	Alexander Kharitonov	Russia	Dynamo Moscow (Russia)
4	126	Johan Hagglund	Sweden	MODO Jr. (Sweden)
5	161	Pavel Sedov	Russia	Khimik Voskresensk (Russia)
6	191	Aaron Gionet	Canada	Kamloops Blazers (WHL)
7	222	Marek Priechodsky	Slovakia	Slovan Bratislava (Slovakia)
7	226	Brian Eklund	United States	Brown University (NCAA)
8	233	Alexander Polukeyev	Russia	SKA St. Petersburg (Russia)
9	263	Thomas Ziegler	Switzerland	HC Ambrì-Piotta (Switzerland)

== See also ==
- 2000–01 NHL season
