= 2000–01 Mighty Ducks of Anaheim season =

NHL team season

2000–01 Mighty Ducks of Anaheim
- Division: 5th Pacific
- Conference: 15th Western
- 2000–01 record: 25–41–11–5
- Home record: 15–20–4–2
- Road record: 10–21–7–3
- Goals for: 188
- Goals against: 245

Team information
- General manager: Pierre Gauthier
- Coach: Craig Hartsburg (Oct.–Dec.); Guy Charron (Dec.–Apr.)
- Captain: Paul Kariya
- Alternate captains: Dan Bylsma; Steve Rucchin; Teemu Selanne (Oct.–Mar.)
- Arena: Arrowhead Pond of Anaheim
- Average attendance: 13,499
- Minor league affiliate: Cincinnati Mighty Ducks

Team leaders
- Goals: Paul Kariya (33)
- Assists: Oleg Tverdovsky (39)
- Points: Paul Kariya (67)
- Penalty minutes: Jim Cummins (167)
- Plus/minus: Antti Aalto (+1)
- Wins: Guy Hebert (12)
- Goals against average: Jean-Sebastien Giguere (2.57)

The 2000–01 Mighty Ducks of Anaheim season was the team's eighth season. The Mighty Ducks failed to qualify for the playoffs for the second year in a row and finished last in the West.

== Offseason ==
After missing the 2000 playoffs by only four points, the Mighty Ducks were quite hopeful to return to the post season. Anaheim was very busy during the summer trading and acquiring a lot prospects and were active on the free agent market as well.

Trying to improve their scoring depth and not relying too much on Kariya and Selanne, the Mighty Ducks signed German Titov and acquired Andrej Nazarov who had a career year in goals (10) and points (31).

Other free agents were Dan Bylsma, Petr Tenkrat as well as Jim Cummins and Kevin Sawyer who were signed to provide the necessary protection for their star players since they lost Stu Grimson to the Kings as a free agent. The team became much more European-based making up half the roster, mainly on their defense (6).

== Regular season ==
The season proved to be very tough as the team never found consistency. The Ducks had a fair start, going 6–4–3–2 until November 4, when the team started having trouble, going winless for five games twice in November, going 2–8–3–1 which led the team to trade Traverse and Nazarov to the Boston Bruins for Samuel Pahlsson on November 18. To make matters even worse, center Steve Rucchin was hit in the face by a shot on November 15 and missed the rest of the season. Despite his absence, the Ducks improved by mid-December, nearing the .500 mark by two games with a 5–3–0–0 record until December 17, but finishing the month 5–7–1–1. Anaheim fired head coach Craig Hartsburg on December 14 after a win against the Blue Jackets, replacing him with assistant coach Guy Charron, though the move did not improve their performance. Despite this roller coaster ride, the Mighty Ducks still remained in the playoff race with a 14–19–6–4 record by January 5, 2001. On January 10 the Mighty Ducks waived Dominic Roussel, resulting in J. S. Giguere becoming their new backup, believing him and Hebert would carry the team into the playoffs and pass on the torch carefully to a new number one during the season.

But all those hopes were shattered as the Mighty Ducks lost sixteen games by March 2 going 4–16–2–1. During this stretch, Hebert went 0–11–2 since December 17th, losing his starting position to Giguere, who had started already more games than Hebert, officially on February 14th – much sooner than had been expected. Though Hebert did not quite play as well as he had the previous two seasons, much of this was based on the team not giving him the necessary support he needed, as Selanne stated in an interview, expressing his frustrations and disappointment. Hebert faced thirty or more shots almost every game, yet was able to keep his save percentage close to the .900 mark.

The Ducks' longest winning streak was five games in early March, when it was clear the team was not going to make the playoffs. During the winning streak Anaheim sent Teemu Selanne to the Sharks in exchange for Jeff Friesen and Steve Shields. Shields' acquisition ended Hebert's tenure with the Mighty Ducks getting waived and picked up by the New York Rangers on March 7 to replace the injured Mike Richter. A week later, Jason Marshall was traded to Washington on March 13. Shields never dressed for the Ducks that season due to an injury and the team called up Gregg Naumenko to serve behind J. S. Giguere. Anaheim's GM Pierre Gauthier felt very confident and fans would accept the trade once the new arrivals dressed for their new team, calling both moves a huge change and necessary as the team needed to look forward and both players would improve the franchise immediately and long term as well. (SunJournal March 6, 2001) Fans gave management the cold shoulder for a long time since they did not believe the trade nor the waiving of Hebert to be a good move (LA Times, March 12th 2001) - especially Hebert's departure was not well received and made little sense, since Steve Shields was injured and out for the rest of the season, a potential trade of Hebert before the trading deadline at least would have resulted in a draft pick in return.

While Selanne enjoyed much success with San Jose, the same could not be said about Anaheim as the Ducks went 2–6–3 after their five-game winning streak, which had fans and experts worried whether the deal with the Sharks was actually worth it. The Mighty Ducks went 11–22–5–1 in the second half with a lot of open questions about the team's future identity with longtime players Hebert, Marshall and Selanne gone.

The defense was the weak link as the team allowed the second-most goals in the West with 245, behind Chicago with 246. Their goaltending was heavily effected by that, too as Guy Hebert and Dominic Roussel recorded a save percentage below .900 which was the first time in team history. In hopes of more scoring depth and not relying on their first line of Paul Kariya, Teemu Selanne and Steve Rucchin, the acquisitions of Andrei Nazarov and German Titov did not pay off at all as the team was at the bottom in scoring. Marty McInnis rediscovered his scoring touch, Tverdovsky ranked third in team scoring, Mike Leclerc had a very good second season despite missing 28 games. Traverse and Nazarov were traded early in mid-December as both did not live up to their expectations. The European youngsters showed some talent but could not fill the scoring void left by Rucchin, who played only 16 games.

The season marked the start of a new era: in goal, the team waived goaltender Guy Hebert (the last remaining original Mighty Duck from the 1993 NHL expansion draft) while focusing on Jean-Sebastien Giguere as their new starter. Their defense lost a valuable cornerstone with Jason Marshall after 6 years. It also marked the breakup of one of the best two forward tandems at the time by trading Teemu Selanne to San Jose without improving the team in scoring.

=== Final standings ===
Pacific Division
No.	CR		GP	W	L	T	OTL	GF	GA	Pts
1	3	**Dallas Stars**	82	48	24	8	2	241	187	106
2	5	**San Jose Sharks**	82	40	27	12	3	217	192	95
3	7	**Los Angeles Kings**	82	38	28	13	3	252	228	92
4	9	Phoenix Coyotes	82	35	27	17	3	214	212	90
5	15	Mighty Ducks of Anaheim	82	25	41	11	5	188	245	66

Note: CR = Conference rank; GP = Games played; W = Wins; L = Losses; T = Ties; OTL = Overtime loss; GF = Goals for; GA = Goals against; Pts = Points
Bolded teams qualified for the playoffs.

Western Conference
R		Div	GP	W	L	T	OTL	GF	GA	Pts
**1**	**p – Colorado Avalanche**	**NW**	**82**	**52**	**16**	**10**	**4**	**270**	**192**	**118**
**2**	**y – Detroit Red Wings**	**CEN**	**82**	**49**	**20**	**9**	**4**	**253**	**202**	**111**
**3**	**y – Dallas Stars**	**PAC**	**82**	**48**	**24**	**8**	**2**	**241**	**187**	**106**
**4**	**St. Louis Blues**	**CEN**	**82**	**43**	**22**	**12**	**5**	**249**	**195**	**103**
**5**	**San Jose Sharks**	**PAC**	**82**	**40**	**27**	**12**	**3**	**217**	**192**	**95**
**6**	**Edmonton Oilers**	**NW**	**82**	**39**	**28**	**12**	**3**	**243**	**222**	**93**
**7**	**Los Angeles Kings**	**PAC**	**82**	**38**	**28**	**13**	**3**	**252**	**228**	**92**
**8**	**Vancouver Canucks**	**NW**	**82**	**36**	**28**	**11**	**7**	**239**	**238**	**90**
8.5
9	Phoenix Coyotes	PAC	82	35	27	17	3	214	212	90
10	Nashville Predators	CEN	82	34	36	9	3	186	200	80
11	Calgary Flames	NW	82	27	36	15	4	197	236	73
12	Chicago Blackhawks	CEN	82	29	40	8	5	210	246	71
13	Columbus Blue Jackets	CEN	82	28	39	9	6	190	233	71
14	Minnesota Wild	NW	82	25	39	13	5	168	210	68
15	Mighty Ducks of Anaheim	PAC	82	25	41	11	5	188	245	66

Divisions: CEN – Central, PAC – Pacific, NW – Northwest

bold – Qualified for playoffs; p – Won Presidents' Trophy; y – Won division

== Schedule and results ==
2000–01 regular season
October: 6–4–1–2 (home: 2–1–0–2; road: 4–3–1–0)

Game	Date	Score	Opponent	Record	Recap
1	October 6, 2000	3–1	Minnesota Wild (2000–01)	1–0–0–0	W
2	October 8, 2000	1–5	St. Louis Blues (2000–01)	1–1–0–0	L
3	October 11, 2000	2–3 OT	Boston Bruins (2000–01)	1–1–0–1	OTL
4	October 14, 2000	2–4	@ New Jersey Devils (2000–01)	1–2–0–1	L
5	October 16, 2000	4–3	@ New York Rangers (2000–01)	2–2–0–1	W
6	October 17, 2000	4–3	@ New York Islanders (2000–01)	3–2–0–1	W
7	October 20, 2000	2–2 OT	@ Buffalo Sabres (2000–01)	3–2–1–1	T
8	October 21, 2000	4–3	@ Philadelphia Flyers (2000–01)	4–2–1–1	W
9	October 23, 2000	4–5 OT	Los Angeles Kings (2000–01)	4–2–1–2	OTL
10	October 25, 2000	2–6	@ Los Angeles Kings (2000–01)	4–3–1–2	L
11	October 27, 2000	3–2	Edmonton Oilers (2000–01)	5–3–1–2	W
12	October 29, 2000	6–3	@ Calgary Flames (2000–01)	6–3–1–2	W
13	October 30, 2000	3–5	@ Edmonton Oilers (2000–01)	6–4–1–2	L

November: 2–8–3–1 (home: 1–4–1–0; road: 1–4–2–1)

Game	Date	Score	Opponent	Record	Recap
14	November 1, 2000	1–1 OT	Phoenix Coyotes (2000–01)	6–4–2–2	T
15	November 4, 2000	3–3 OT	@ Nashville Predators (2000–01)	6–4–3–2	T
16	November 5, 2000	2–4	@ Chicago Blackhawks (2000–01)	6–5–3–2	L
17	November 8, 2000	2–7	Vancouver Canucks (2000–01)	6–6–3–2	L
18	November 11, 2000	1–3	@ Colorado Avalanche (2000–01)	6–7–3–2	L
19	November 12, 2000	2–3	Detroit Red Wings (2000–01)	6–8–3–2	L
20	November 15, 2000	0–3	Colorado Avalanche (2000–01)	6–9–3–2	L
21	November 18, 2000	6–2	@ Phoenix Coyotes (2000–01)	7–9–3–2	W
22	November 19, 2000	2–1	New York Islanders (2000–01)	8–9–3–2	W
23	November 22, 2000	2–5	New Jersey Devils (2000–01)	8–10–3–2	L
24	November 24, 2000	2–2 OT	@ Calgary Flames (2000–01)	8–10–4–2	T
25	November 25, 2000	2–3	@ Edmonton Oilers (2000–01)	8–11–4–2	L
26	November 28, 2000	1–4	@ Vancouver Canucks (2000–01)	8–12–4–2	L
27	November 30, 2000	2–3 OT	@ San Jose Sharks (2000–01)	8–12–4–3	OTL

December: 5–7–1–1 (home: 4–2–0–0; road: 1–5–1–1)

Game	Date	Score	Opponent	Record	Recap
28	December 3, 2000	4–0	Los Angeles Kings (2000–01)	9–12–4–3	W
29	December 5, 2000	0–1	@ St. Louis Blues (2000–01)	9–13–4–3	L
30	December 6, 2000	2–5	@ Columbus Blue Jackets (2000–01)	9–14–4–3	L
31	December 8, 2000	1–0 OT	@ Minnesota Wild (2000–01)	10–14–4–3	W
32	December 10, 2000	0–1	Dallas Stars (2000–01)	10–15–4–3	L
33	December 13, 2000	5–4 OT	Columbus Blue Jackets (2000–01)	11–15–4–3	W
34	December 15, 2000	6–4	New York Rangers (2000–01)	12–15–4–3	W
35	December 17, 2000	3–1	Tampa Bay Lightning (2000–01)	13–15–4–3	W
36	December 20, 2000	2–4	Atlanta Thrashers (2000–01)	13–16–4–3	L
37	December 22, 2000	1–2 OT	@ Detroit Red Wings (2000–01)	13–16–4–4	OTL
38	December 23, 2000	2–5	@ St. Louis Blues (2000–01)	13–17–4–4	L
39	December 27, 2000	1–3	@ Dallas Stars (2000–01)	13–18–4–4	L
40	December 28, 2000	2–2 OT	@ Nashville Predators (2000–01)	13–18–5–4	T
41	December 31, 2000	2–3	@ Minnesota Wild (2000–01)	13–19–5–4	L

January: 2–10–1–0 (home: 1–6–1–0; road: 1–4–0–0)

Game	Date	Score	Opponent	Record	Recap
42	January 3, 2001	3–2 OT	Florida Panthers (2000–01)	14–19–5–4	W
43	January 5, 2001	4–4 OT	Calgary Flames (2000–01)	14–19–6–4	T
44	January 10, 2001	2–4	St. Louis Blues (2000–01)	14–20–6–4	L
45	January 12, 2001	0–4	Buffalo Sabres (2000–01)	14–21–6–4	L
46	January 14, 2001	0–4	@ Carolina Hurricanes (2000–01)	14–22–6–4	L
47	January 15, 2001	2–3	@ Pittsburgh Penguins (2000–01)	14–23–6–4	L
48	January 17, 2001	5–2	@ Atlanta Thrashers (2000–01)	15–23–6–4	W
49	January 19, 2001	3–4	Phoenix Coyotes (2000–01)	15–24–6–4	L
50	January 21, 2001	2–4	Colorado Avalanche (2000–01)	15–25–6–4	L
51	January 24, 2001	0–5	Minnesota Wild (2000–01)	15–26–6–4	L
52	January 26, 2001	2–3	@ Detroit Red Wings (2000–01)	15–27–6–4	L
53	January 27, 2001	1–2	@ Columbus Blue Jackets (2000–01)	15–28–6–4	L
54	January 31, 2001	0–3	Nashville Predators (2000–01)	15–29–6–4	L

February: 3–5–2–1 (home: 2–4–2–0; road: 1–1–0–1)

Game	Date	Score	Opponent	Record	Recap
55	February 1, 2001	4–2	@ Phoenix Coyotes (2000–01)	16–29–6–4	W
56	February 7, 2001	2–3	Chicago Blackhawks (2000–01)	16–30–6–4	L
57	February 9, 2001	3–4	Washington Capitals (2000–01)	16–31–6–4	L
58	February 11, 2001	2–2 OT	Carolina Hurricanes (2000–01)	16–31–7–4	T
59	February 14, 2001	3–3 OT	Edmonton Oilers (2000–01)	16–31–8–4	T
60	February 16, 2001	2–3 OT	@ Dallas Stars (2000–01)	16–31–8–5	OTL
61	February 19, 2001	6–2	Calgary Flames (2000–01)	17–31–8–5	W
62	February 21, 2001	1–0	San Jose Sharks (2000–01)	18–31–8–5	W
63	February 23, 2001	1–3	@ San Jose Sharks (2000–01)	18–32–8–5	L
64	February 25, 2001	2–5	Columbus Blue Jackets (2000–01)	18–33–8–5	L
65	February 28, 2001	1–3	Detroit Red Wings (2000–01)	18–34–8–5	L

March: 6–5–2–0 (home: 4–1–0–0; road: 2–4–2–0)

Game	Date	Score	Opponent	Record	Recap
66	March 2, 2001	2–5	Dallas Stars (2000–01)	18–35–8–5	L
67	March 4, 2001	4–0	Los Angeles Kings (2000–01)	19–35–8–5	W
68	March 7, 2001	4–2	Montreal Canadiens (2000–01)	20–35–8–5	W
69	March 9, 2001	3–1	Chicago Blackhawks (2000–01)	21–35–8–5	W
70	March 11, 2001	1–0 OT	Nashville Predators (2000–01)	22–35–8–5	W
71	March 13, 2001	2–0	@ Washington Capitals (2000–01)	23–35–8–5	W
72	March 14, 2001	2–3	@ Toronto Maple Leafs (2000–01)	23–36–8–5	L
73	March 16, 2001	1–4	@ Ottawa Senators (2000–01)	23–37–8–5	L
74	March 18, 2001	4–1	@ Chicago Blackhawks (2000–01)	24–37–8–5	W
75	March 21, 2001	0–8	@ Dallas Stars (2000–01)	24–38–8–5	L
76	March 24, 2001	3–3 OT	@ Los Angeles Kings (2000–01)	24–38–9–5	T
77	March 29, 2001	4–7	@ San Jose Sharks (2000–01)	24–39–9–5	L
78	March 30, 2001	2–2 OT	@ Vancouver Canucks (2000–01)	24–39–10–5	T

April: 1–2–1–0 (home: 1–2–0–0; road: 0–0–1–0)

Game	Date	Score	Opponent	Record	Recap
79	April 1, 2001	2–1	Vancouver Canucks (2000–01)	25–39–10–5	W
80	April 4, 2001	1–1 OT	@ Colorado Avalanche (2000–01)	25–39–11–5	T
81	April 6, 2001	2–5	Phoenix Coyotes (2000–01)	25–40–11–5	L
82	April 8, 2001	1–4	San Jose Sharks (2000–01)	25–41–11–5	L

Legend: W Win (2 points) L Loss (0 points) T Tie (1 point) OTL Overtime loss (1 point)

== Player statistics ==
=== Scoring ===
- Position abbreviations: C = Center; D = Defense; G = Goaltender; LW = Left wing; RW = Right wing
- † = Joined team via a transaction (e.g., trade, waivers, signing) during the season. Stats reflect time with the Mighty Ducks only.
- ‡ = Left team via a transaction (e.g., trade, waivers, release) during the season. Stats reflect time with the Mighty Ducks only.

No.	Player	Pos	Regular season					
No.	Player	Pos	GP	G	A	Pts	+/-	PIM
9	Paul Kariya	LW	66	33	34	67	−9	20
8	Teemu Selanne‡	RW	61	26	33	59	−8	36
10	Oleg Tverdovsky	D	82	14	39	53	−11	32
16	Marty McInnis	RW	75	20	22	42	−21	40
17	Matt Cullen	C	82	10	30	40	−23	38
15	Tony Hrkac	C	80	13	25	38	0	29
12	Mike Leclerc	LW	54	15	20	35	−1	26
13	German Titov	LW	71	9	11	20	−21	61
18	Petr Tenkrat	RW	46	5	9	14	−11	16
28	Niclas Havelid	D	47	4	10	14	−6	34
11	Jeff Friesen†	LW	15	2	10	12	−2	10
19	Jim Cummins	RW	79	5	6	11	−11	167
25	Mike Crowley†	D	39	1	10	11	−16	20
5 (Note: Vishnevski wore number 6 through January 5.)	Vitaly Vishnevski	D	76	1	10	11	−1	99
27	Pascal Trepanier	D	57	6	4	10	−12	73
21	Dan Bylsma	LW	82	1	9	10	−12	22
20	Steve Rucchin	C	16	3	5	8	−5	0
7	Pavel Trnka	D	59	1	7	8	−12	42
29	Ladislav Kohn‡	RW	51	4	3	7	−15	42
32	Marc Chouinard	C	44	3	4	7	−5	12
23	Jason Marshall‡	D	50	3	4	7	−12	105
26	Samuel Pahlsson†	C	59	3	4	7	−9	14
24	Ruslan Salei	D	50	1	5	6	−14	70
22	Jonas Ronnqvist	RW	38	0	4	4	−7	14
14	Antti Aalto	C	12	1	1	2	1	2
40 (Note: After wearing number 40 in his first game, Niemi wore number 25 in his next four games before switching back.)	Antti-Jussi Niemi	D	28	1	1	2	−6	22
35	Jean-Sebastien Giguere	G	34	0	2	2		8
11 (Note: McDonald wore number 48 in his first game.)	Andy McDonald	C	16	1	0	1	0	6
26	Andrei Nazarov‡	RW	16	1	0	1	−9	29
3	Patrick Traverse‡	D	15	1	0	1	−6	6
46	Kevin Sawyer	LW	9	0	1	1	−1	27
31	Guy Hebert‡	G	41	0	0	0		0
1	Gregg Naumenko	G	2	0	0	0		2
30	Dominic Roussel‡	G	13	0	0	0		0
37	Bob Wren	C	1	0	0	0	−1	0

=== Goaltending ===
- ‡ = Left team via a transaction (e.g., trade, waivers, release) during the season. Stats reflect time with the Mighty Ducks only.

No.	Player	Regular season									
No.	Player	GP	W	L	T	SA	GA	GAA	SV%	SO	TOI
31	Guy Hebert‡	41	12	23	4	1112	115	3.12	.897	2	2215
35	Jean-Sebastien Giguere	34	11	17	5	976	87	2.57	.911	4	2031
30	Dominic Roussel‡	13	2	5	2	295	31	2.85	.895	0	653
1	Gregg Naumenko	2	0	1	0	29	7	6.00	.759	0	70

== Awards and records ==
=== Awards ===
Type	Award/honor	Recipient	Ref
League (in-season)	NHL All-Star Game selection	Paul Kariya (Note: Kariya was voted to the starting lineup.)	

=== Milestones ===
Milestone	Player	Date	Ref
First game	Jonas Ronnqvist	October 6, 2000	
First game	Antti-Jussi Niemi	October 25, 2000	
First game	Andy McDonald	November 12, 2000	
First game	Petr Tenkrat	November 30, 2000	
First game	Marc Chouinard	December 15, 2000	
First game	Gregg Naumenko	March 21, 2001	

== Transactions ==
The Mighty Ducks were involved in the following transactions from June 11, 2000, the day after the deciding game of the 2000 Stanley Cup Final, through June 9, 2001, the day of the deciding game of the 2001 Stanley Cup Final.

=== Trades ===
Date	Details		Ref
June 12, 2000	To Mighty Ducks of Anaheim: Patrick Traverse	To Ottawa Senators: Joel Kwiatkowski	
June 12, 2000	To Mighty Ducks of Anaheim: 7th-round pick in 2001	To New Jersey Devils: Ed Ward	
June 24, 2000	To Mighty Ducks of Anaheim: 2nd-round pick in 2000	To Montreal Canadiens: 3rd-round pick in 2000; 4th-round pick in 2000; 5th-round pick in 2000	
June 25, 2000	To Mighty Ducks of Anaheim: Rights to Jonathan Hedstrom	To Toronto Maple Leafs: 6th-round pick in 2000; 7th-round pick in 2000	
September 26, 2000	To Mighty Ducks of Anaheim: Andrei Nazarov; 2nd-round pick in 2001	To Calgary Flames: Rights to Jordan Leopold	
November 18, 2000	To Mighty Ducks of Anaheim: Samuel Pahlsson	To Boston Bruins: Andrei Nazarov; Patrick Traverse	
February 9, 2001	To Mighty Ducks of Anaheim: Scott Langkow; Sergei Vyshedkevich	To Atlanta Thrashers: Ladislav Kohn	
March 5, 2001	To Mighty Ducks of Anaheim: Jeff Friesen; Steve Shields; Conditional 2nd-round pick in 2003	To San Jose Sharks: Teemu Selanne (Note: Anaheim agreed to pay a portion of Selanne’s salary on the final year of his contract in 2001–02.)	
March 13, 2001	To Mighty Ducks of Anaheim: Alexei Tezikov; 4th-round pick in 2001	To Washington Capitals: Jason Marshall	

=== Players acquired ===
Date	Player	Former team	Term	Via	Ref
June 13, 2000	Jarrett Smith	Prince Albert Raiders (WHL)	multi-year	Free agency	
July 1, 2000	German Titov	Edmonton Oilers	3-year	Free agency	
July 5, 2000	Jim Cummins	Montreal Canadiens	1-year	Free agency	
July 13, 2000	Dan Bylsma	Los Angeles Kings	1-year (Note: Club option for a second year.)	Free agency	
July 13, 2000	Kevin Sawyer	Phoenix Coyotes	2-year	Free agency	
July 20, 2000	Chris O'Sullivan	Vancouver Canucks	1-year	Free agency	

=== Players lost ===
Date	Player	New team	Via (Note: In parentheses is the player's free agency group on July 1 if applicable.)	Ref
N/A	Lloyd Shaw	Hamilton Bulldogs (AHL)	Free agency (UFA)	
June 23, 2000	Ladislav Benysek	Minnesota Wild	Expansion draft	
June 23, 2000	Jeff Nielsen	Minnesota Wild	Expansion draft	
July 3, 2000	Kevin Haller	New York Islanders	Free agency (V)	
July 5, 2000	Scott Ferguson	Edmonton Oilers	Free agency (VI)	
July 6, 2000	Stu Grimson	Los Angeles Kings	Free agency (III)	
August 11, 2000	Peter Leboutillier	Los Angeles Kings	Free agency (VI)	
August 17, 2000	Ted Donato	Dallas Stars	Free agency (III)	
September 5, 2000	Frank Banham	Espoo Blues (Liiga)	Free agency (VI)	
September 11, 2000	Tom Askey	Rochester Americans (AHL)	Free agency (VI)	
September 24, 2000	Kip Miller	Pittsburgh Penguins	Free agency (UFA)	
September 25, 2000	Jeremy Stevenson	Nashville Predators	Free agency (VI)	
October 3, 2000	Corey Hirsch	Portland Pirates (AHL)	Free agency (UFA)	
October 5, 2000	Tony Tuzzolino	Hartford Wolf Pack (AHL)	Free agency (UFA)	
October 16, 2000	Chad Wagner	San Diego Gulls (WCHL)	Free agency (UFA)	
October 27, 2000	Blaine Russell	Columbus Cottonmouths (CHL)	Free agency (UFA)	
January 10, 2001	Dominic Roussel	Edmonton Oilers	Waivers	
March 7, 2001	Guy Hebert	New York Rangers	Waivers	
April 26, 2001	Antti Aalto	Jokerit (Liiga)	Free agency	

=== Signings ===
Date	Player	Term	Contract type	Ref
July 6, 2000	Peter Podhradsky	3-year	Entry-level	
July 13, 2000	Dean Malkoc	1-year	Re-signing	
July 14, 2000	Jonas Ronnqvist	2-year	Entry-level	
July 25, 2000	Marc Chouinard	1-year	Re-signing	
July 25, 2000	Marty McInnis	1-year	Re-signing	
July 27, 2000	Mike Leclerc	1-year	Re-signing	
July 31, 2000	Jean-Sebastien Giguere	1-year	Re-signing	
August 7, 2000	Patrick Traverse	1-year	Arbitration award	
August 11, 2000	Ladislav Kohn	1-year	Arbitration award	
August 16, 2000	Antti Aalto	1-year	Arbitration award	
September 5, 2000	Matt Cullen	1-year	Re-signing	
September 15, 2000	Oleg Tverdovsky	3-year	Re-signing	
December 7, 2000	Mike Crowley	1-year	Re-signing	
March 8, 2001	Marty McInnis	3-year	Extension	

== Draft picks ==
Anaheim's draft picks at the 2000 NHL entry draft held at the Pengrowth Saddledome in Calgary, Alberta.

Round	#	Player	Nationality	College/Junior/Club team (League)
1	12	Alexei Smirnov	Russia	THK Tver (Russia)
2	44	Ilya Bryzgalov	Russia	Lada Togliatti (Russia)
4	98	Jonas Ronnqvist	Sweden	Lulea HF (Sweden)
5	134	Peter Podhradsky	Slovakia	Slovan Bratislava (Slovakia)
5	153	Bill Cass	United States	Boston College (ECAC)

== Farm teams ==
Cincinnati Mighty Ducks ( shared with the Detroit Red Wings )

== See also ==
- 2000–01 NHL season
