= 2000–01 Vancouver Canucks season =

NHL hockey team season

2000–01 Vancouver Canucks
- Division: 3rd Northwest
- Conference: 8th Western
- 2000–01 record: 36–28–11–7
- Home record: 21–12–5–3
- Road record: 15–16–6–4
- Goals for: 239
- Goals against: 238

Team information
- General manager: Brian Burke
- Coach: Marc Crawford
- Captain: Markus Naslund
- Arena: General Motors Place
- Average attendance: 17,712
- Minor league affiliate: Kansas City Blades (IHL)

Team leaders
- Goals: Markus Naslund (41)
- Assists: Andrew Cassels (44)
- Points: Markus Naslund (75)
- Penalty minutes: Donald Brashear (145)
- Plus/minus: Jason Strudwick (+16)
- Wins: Bob Essensa (18)
- Goals against average: Dan Cloutier (2.43)

The 2000–01 Vancouver Canucks season was the team's 31st in the National Hockey League (NHL). The Canucks qualified for the playoffs for the first time since 1996, but lost in the first round in a four-game sweep to the eventual Stanley Cup champion Colorado Avalanche.

== Offseason ==
Markus Naslund became the captain after Mark Messier signed with the New York Rangers.

== Regular season ==
=== Final standings ===
Northwest Division
No.	CR		GP	W	L	T	OTL	GF	GA	Pts
1	1	**Colorado Avalanche**	82	52	16	10	4	270	192	118
2	6	**Edmonton Oilers**	82	39	28	12	3	243	222	93
3	8	**Vancouver Canucks**	82	36	28	11	7	239	238	90
4	11	Calgary Flames	82	27	36	15	4	197	236	73
5	14	Minnesota Wild	82	25	39	13	5	168	210	68

Note: CR = Conference rank; GP = Games played; W = Wins; L = Losses; T = Ties; OTL = Overtime loss; GF = Goals for; GA = Goals against; Pts = Points
Bolded teams qualified for the playoffs.

Western Conference
R		Div	GP	W	L	T	OTL	GF	GA	Pts
**1**	**p – Colorado Avalanche**	**NW**	**82**	**52**	**16**	**10**	**4**	**270**	**192**	**118**
**2**	**y – Detroit Red Wings**	**CEN**	**82**	**49**	**20**	**9**	**4**	**253**	**202**	**111**
**3**	**y – Dallas Stars**	**PAC**	**82**	**48**	**24**	**8**	**2**	**241**	**187**	**106**
**4**	**St. Louis Blues**	**CEN**	**82**	**43**	**22**	**12**	**5**	**249**	**195**	**103**
**5**	**San Jose Sharks**	**PAC**	**82**	**40**	**27**	**12**	**3**	**217**	**192**	**95**
**6**	**Edmonton Oilers**	**NW**	**82**	**39**	**28**	**12**	**3**	**243**	**222**	**93**
**7**	**Los Angeles Kings**	**PAC**	**82**	**38**	**28**	**13**	**3**	**252**	**228**	**92**
**8**	**Vancouver Canucks**	**NW**	**82**	**36**	**28**	**11**	**7**	**239**	**238**	**90**
8.5
9	Phoenix Coyotes	PAC	82	35	27	17	3	214	212	90
10	Nashville Predators	CEN	82	34	36	9	3	186	200	80
11	Calgary Flames	NW	82	27	36	15	4	197	236	73
12	Chicago Blackhawks	CEN	82	29	40	8	5	210	246	71
13	Columbus Blue Jackets	CEN	82	28	39	9	6	190	233	71
14	Minnesota Wild	NW	82	25	39	13	5	168	210	68
15	Mighty Ducks of Anaheim	PAC	82	25	41	11	5	188	245	66

Divisions: CEN – Central, PAC – Pacific, NW – Northwest

bold – Qualified for playoffs; p – Won Presidents' Trophy; y – Won division

== Schedule and results ==
=== Regular season ===
2000–01 regular season
October: 6–2–2–1 (home: 3–1–1–1; road: 3–1–1–0)

Game	Date	Score	Opponent	Record	Recap
1	October 5, 2000	3–6	@ Philadelphia Flyers (2000–01)	0–1–0–0	L
2	October 6, 2000	4–3 OT	@ Florida Panthers (2000–01)	1–1–0–0	W
3	October 8, 2000	5–4	@ Tampa Bay Lightning (2000–01)	2–1–0–0	W
4	October 12, 2000	2–5	Colorado Avalanche (2000–01)	2–2–0–0	L
5	October 14, 2000	4–0	Buffalo Sabres (2000–01)	3–2–0–0	W
6	October 16, 2000	5–2	Toronto Maple Leafs (2000–01)	4–2–0–0	W
7	October 18, 2000	4–1	Calgary Flames (2000–01)	5–2–0–0	W
8	October 21, 2000	2–3 OT	Phoenix Coyotes (2000–01)	5–2–0–1	OTL
9	October 24, 2000	4–4 OT	@ Nashville Predators (2000–01)	5–2–1–1	T
10	October 25, 2000	6–2	@ Dallas Stars (2000–01)	6–2–1–1	W
11	October 27, 2000	1–1 OT	Atlanta Thrashers (2000–01)	6–2–2–1	T

November: 7–6–1–1 (home: 4–3–1–0; road: 3–3–0–1)

Game	Date	Score	Opponent	Record	Recap
12	November 1, 2000	4–3	Colorado Avalanche (2000–01)	7–2–2–1	W
13	November 3, 2000	2–4	Pittsburgh Penguins (2000–01)	7–3–2–1	L
14	November 5, 2000	2–2 OT	San Jose Sharks (2000–01)	7–3–3–1	T
15	November 8, 2000	7–2	@ Mighty Ducks of Anaheim (2000–01)	8–3–3–1	W
16	November 9, 2000	0–2	@ Los Angeles Kings (2000–01)	8–4–3–1	L
17	November 11, 2000	2–5	St. Louis Blues (2000–01)	8–5–3–1	L
18	November 14, 2000	4–2	Chicago Blackhawks (2000–01)	9–5–3–1	W
19	November 17, 2000	4–3	New York Rangers (2000–01)	10–5–3–1	W
20	November 19, 2000	6–1	@ Columbus Blue Jackets (2000–01)	11–5–3–1	W
21	November 21, 2000	4–3	@ St. Louis Blues (2000–01)	12–5–3–1	W
22	November 22, 2000	2–3 OT	@ Washington Capitals (2000–01)	12–5–3–2	OTL
23	November 24, 2000	2–3	@ Detroit Red Wings (2000–01)	12–6–3–2	L
24	November 26, 2000	2–4	@ Minnesota Wild (2000–01)	12–7–3–2	L
25	November 28, 2000	4–1	Mighty Ducks of Anaheim (2000–01)	13–7–3–2	W
26	November 30, 2000	3–4	Montreal Canadiens (2000–01)	13–8–3–2	L

December: 6–3–1–2 (home: 4–1–0–0; road: 2–2–1–2)

Game	Date	Score	Opponent	Record	Recap
27	December 2, 2000	5–2	Edmonton Oilers (2000–01)	14–8–3–2	W
28	December 4, 2000	6–3	Nashville Predators (2000–01)	15–8–3–2	W
29	December 6, 2000	1–1 OT	@ Phoenix Coyotes (2000–01)	15–8–4–2	T
30	December 8, 2000	6–1	@ San Jose Sharks (2000–01)	16–8–4–2	W
31	December 10, 2000	1–2	Los Angeles Kings (2000–01)	16–9–4–2	L
32	December 16, 2000	4–3	Columbus Blue Jackets (2000–01)	17–9–4–2	W
33	December 20, 2000	2–3 OT	@ Edmonton Oilers (2000–01)	17–9–4–3	OTL
34	December 21, 2000	4–6	@ Chicago Blackhawks (2000–01)	17–10–4–3	L
35	December 23, 2000	2–3 OT	@ Colorado Avalanche (2000–01)	17–10–4–4	OTL
36	December 27, 2000	3–2	Montreal Canadiens (2000–01)	18–10–4–4	W
37	December 29, 2000	0–5	@ Calgary Flames (2000–01)	18–11–4–4	L
38	December 30, 2000	6–3	@ San Jose Sharks (2000–01)	19–11–4–4	W

January: 8–7–0–0 (home: 5–3–0–0; road: 3–4–0–0)

Game	Date	Score	Opponent	Record	Recap
39	January 1, 2001	5–2	@ Nashville Predators (2000–01)	20–11–4–4	W
40	January 3, 2001	0–6	@ Chicago Blackhawks (2000–01)	20–12–4–4	L
41	January 6, 2001	4–3	Columbus Blue Jackets (2000–01)	21–12–4–4	W
42	January 8, 2001	2–1	Nashville Predators (2000–01)	22–12–4–4	W
43	January 10, 2001	1–5	Ottawa Senators (2000–01)	22–13–4–4	L
44	January 12, 2001	3–2	@ Edmonton Oilers (2000–01)	23–13–4–4	W
45	January 14, 2001	5–1	Calgary Flames (2000–01)	24–13–4–4	W
46	January 16, 2001	2–4	Detroit Red Wings (2000–01)	24–14–4–4	L
47	January 18, 2001	3–7	@ Colorado Avalanche (2000–01)	24–15–4–4	L
48	January 20, 2001	0–3	@ St. Louis Blues (2000–01)	24–16–4–4	L
49	January 22, 2001	1–2	@ Dallas Stars (2000–01)	24–17–4–4	L
50	January 24, 2001	6–2	Phoenix Coyotes (2000–01)	25–17–4–4	W
51	January 27, 2001	5–3	@ Calgary Flames (2000–01)	26–17–4–4	W
52	January 28, 2001	2–6	Chicago Blackhawks (2000–01)	26–18–4–4	L
53	January 30, 2001	3–2 OT	Minnesota Wild (2000–01)	27–18–4–4	W

February: 6–3–1–1 (home: 3–1–1–1; road: 3–2–0–0)

Game	Date	Score	Opponent	Record	Recap
54	February 1, 2001	5–3	Colorado Avalanche (2000–01)	28–18–4–4	W
55	February 8, 2001	0–0 OT	San Jose Sharks (2000–01)	28–18–5–4	T
56	February 10, 2001	1–4	Calgary Flames (2000–01)	28–19–5–4	L
57	February 14, 2001	3–4 OT	Washington Capitals (2000–01)	28–19–5–5	OTL
58	February 17, 2001	6–5 OT	@ Edmonton Oilers (2000–01)	29–19–5–5	W
59	February 18, 2001	3–2	New York Islanders (2000–01)	30–19–5–5	W
60	February 21, 2001	2–1	@ Montreal Canadiens (2000–01)	31–19–5–5	W
61	February 22, 2001	1–4	@ Toronto Maple Leafs (2000–01)	31–20–5–5	L
62	February 24, 2001	0–3	@ Ottawa Senators (2000–01)	31–21–5–5	L
63	February 26, 2001	5–2	@ Minnesota Wild (2000–01)	32–21–5–5	W
64	February 28, 2001	5–4	Dallas Stars (2000–01)	33–21–5–5	W

March: 2–4–6–2 (home: 1–2–2–1; road: 1–2–4–1)

Game	Date	Score	Opponent	Record	Recap
65	March 2, 2001	3–2 OT	St. Louis Blues (2000–01)	34–21–5–5	W
66	March 4, 2001	3–4 OT	Minnesota Wild (2000–01)	34–21–5–6	OTL
67	March 6, 2001	3–4	Detroit Red Wings (2000–01)	34–22–5–6	L
68	March 8, 2001	2–3 OT	@ Phoenix Coyotes (2000–01)	34–22–5–7	OTL
69	March 10, 2001	3–3 OT	Toronto Maple Leafs (2000–01)	34–22–6–7	T
70	March 13, 2001	2–2 OT	@ Detroit Red Wings (2000–01)	34–22–7–7	T
71	March 15, 2001	2–2 OT	@ Boston Bruins (2000–01)	34–22–8–7	T
72	March 16, 2001	2–4	@ Buffalo Sabres (2000–01)	34–23–8–7	L
73	March 18, 2001	5–3	@ Atlanta Thrashers (2000–01)	35–23–8–7	W
74	March 21, 2001	1–1 OT	@ Columbus Blue Jackets (2000–01)	35–23–9–7	T
75	March 23, 2001	0–4	@ New Jersey Devils (2000–01)	35–24–9–7	L
76	March 25, 2001	2–2 OT	@ Minnesota Wild (2000–01)	35–24–10–7	T
77	March 28, 2001	1–3	Dallas Stars (2000–01)	35–25–10–7	L
78	March 30, 2001	2–2 OT	Mighty Ducks of Anaheim (2000–01)	35–25–11–7	T

April: 1–3–0–0 (home: 1–1–0–0; road: 0–2–0–0)

Game	Date	Score	Opponent	Record	Recap
79	April 1, 2001	1–2	@ Mighty Ducks of Anaheim (2000–01)	35–26–11–7	L
80	April 2, 2001	1–3	@ Los Angeles Kings (2000–01)	35–27–11–7	L
81	April 5, 2001	3–2 OT	Los Angeles Kings (2000–01)	36–27–11–7	W
82	April 7, 2001	2–4	Edmonton Oilers (2000–01)	36–28–11–7	L

Legend: W Win (2 points) L Loss (0 points) T Tie (1 point) OTL Overtime loss (1 point)

=== Playoffs ===
2001 Stanley Cup playoffs
Western Conference Quarterfinals vs. (1) Colorado Avalanche: Avalanche win 4–0

Game	Date	Score	Opponent	Series	Recap
1	April 12, 2001	4–5	@ Colorado Avalanche	Avalanche lead 1–0	L
2	April 14, 2001	1–2	@ Colorado Avalanche	Avalanche lead 2–0	L
3	April 16, 2001	3–4 OT	Colorado Avalanche	Avalanche lead 3–0	L
4	April 18, 2001	1–5	Colorado Avalanche	Avalanche win 4–0	L

Legend: W Win L Loss

== Player statistics ==
=== Scoring ===
- Position abbreviations: C = Centre; D = Defence; G = Goaltender; LW = Left wing; RW = Right wing
- † = Joined team via a transaction (e.g., trade, waivers, signing) during the season. Stats reflect time with the Canucks only.
- ‡ = Left team via a transaction (e.g., trade, waivers, release) during the season. Stats reflect time with the Canucks only.

No.	Player	Pos	Regular season						Playoffs					
No.	Player	Pos	GP	G	A	Pts	+/-	PIM	GP	G	A	Pts	+/-	PIM
19	Markus Naslund	RW	72	41	34	75	−2	58	—	—	—	—	—	—
25	Andrew Cassels	C	66	12	44	56	1	10	—	—	—	—	—	—
44	Todd Bertuzzi	LW	79	25	30	55	−18	93	4	2	2	4	1	8
7	Brendan Morrison	C	82	16	38	54	2	42	4	1	2	3	−2	0
55	Ed Jovanovski	D	79	12	35	47	−1	102	4	1	1	2	−5	0
72	Peter Schaefer	LW	82	16	20	36	4	22	3	0	0	0	−3	0
22	Daniel Sedin	C	75	20	14	34	−3	24	4	1	2	3	−1	0
26	Trent Klatt	RW	77	13	20	33	8	31	4	3	0	3	−3	0
15	Harold Druken	C	55	15	15	30	2	14	4	0	1	1	−5	0
33	Henrik Sedin	LW	82	9	20	29	−2	38	4	0	4	4	1	0
8	Donald Brashear	LW	79	9	19	28	0	145	4	0	0	0	−2	0
2	Mattias Ohlund	D	65	8	20	28	−16	46	4	1	3	4	−5	6
24	Matt Cooke	RW	81	14	13	27	5	94	4	0	0	0	−3	4
6	Adrian Aucoin‡	D	47	3	13	16	13	20	—	—	—	—	—	—
3	Brent Sopel	D	52	4	10	14	4	10	4	0	0	0	−1	2
14	Scott Lachance	D	76	3	11	14	5	46	2	0	1	1	0	2
20	Denis Pederson	RW	61	4	8	12	0	65	4	0	1	1	−1	4
23	Murray Baron	D	82	3	8	11	−13	63	4	0	0	0	−4	0
4	Greg Hawgood	D	16	2	5	7	8	6	—	—	—	—	—	—
18	Steve Kariya	LW	17	1	6	7	−1	8	—	—	—	—	—	—
37	Jarkko Ruutu	LW	21	3	3	6	1	32	4	0	1	1	0	8
28	Bryan Helmer	D	20	2	4	6	0	18	—	—	—	—	—	—
34	Jason Strudwick	D	60	1	4	5	16	64	2	0	0	0	0	0
9	Mike Stapleton†	C	18	1	2	3	−6	8	—	—	—	—	—	—
17	Drake Berehowsky†	D	14	1	1	2	0	21	4	0	0	0	2	12
29	Felix Potvin‡	G	35	0	2	2		2	—	—	—	—	—	—
21	Josh Holden	C	10	1	0	1	0	0	—	—	—	—	—	—
5	Bryan Allen	D	6	0	0	0	0	0	2	0	0	0	1	2
27	Mike Brown	LW	1	0	0	0	0	5	—	—	—	—	—	—
13	Artem Chubarov	C	1	0	0	0	−1	0	—	—	—	—	—	—
39	Dan Cloutier†	G	16	0	0	0		0	2	0	0	0		0
35	Bob Essensa	G	39	0	0	0		4	2	0	0	0		0
43	Pat Kavanagh	RW	—	—	—	—	—	—	3	0	0	0	0	2

=== Goaltending ===
- † = Joined team via a transaction (e.g., trade, waivers, signing) during the season. Stats reflect time with the Canucks only.
- ‡ = Left team via a transaction (e.g., trade, waivers, release) during the season. Stats reflect time with the Canucks only.

No.	Player	Regular season										Playoffs								
No.	Player	GP	W	L	T	SA	GA	GAA	SV%	SO	TOI	GP	W	L	SA	GA	GAA	SV%	SO	TOI
35	Bob Essensa	39	18	12	3	854	92	2.68	.892	1	2059	2	0	2	58	6	2.95	.897	0	122
29	Felix Potvin‡	35	14	17	3	914	103	3.08	.887	1	2006	—	—	—	—	—	—	—	—	—
39	Dan Cloutier†	16	4	6	5	348	37	2.43	.894	0	914	2	0	2	57	9	4.63	.842	0	117

== Awards and records ==
=== Awards ===
Type	Award/honour	Recipient	Ref
League (in-season)	NHL All-Star Game selection	Ed Jovanovski (Note: Jovanovski was an injury replacement for Chris Pronger of the St. Louis Blues.)	
League (in-season)	NHL All-Star Game selection	Markus Naslund	
Team	Babe Pratt Trophy	Ed Jovanovski	
Team	Cyclone Taylor Trophy	Markus Naslund	
Team	Cyrus H. McLean Trophy	Markus Naslund	
Team	Fred J. Hume Award	Murray Baron	
Team	Molson Cup	Markus Naslund	
Team	Most Exciting Player Award	Markus Naslund	

=== Milestones ===
Milestone	Player	Date	Ref
First game	Daniel Sedin	October 5, 2000	
First game	Henrik Sedin	October 5, 2000	
First game	Mike Brown	November 21, 2000	
First game	Bryan Allen	February 26, 2001	
First game	Pat Kavanagh	April 14, 2001	

== Transactions ==
The Canucks were involved in the following transactions from June 11, 2000, the day after the deciding game of the 2000 Stanley Cup Final, through June 9, 2001, the day of the deciding game of the 2001 Stanley Cup Final.

=== Trades ===
Date	Details		Ref
June 24, 2000	To Vancouver Canucks: Future considerations	To Phoenix Coyotes: Brad May	
June 24, 2000	To Vancouver Canucks: 2nd-round pick in 2001; 3rd-round pick in 2001	To Atlanta Thrashers: 2nd-round pick in 2000; 3rd-round pick in 2001	
December 28, 2000	To Vancouver Canucks: Mike Stapleton	To New York Islanders: 9th-round pick in 2001	
February 7, 2001	To Vancouver Canucks: Dan Cloutier	To Tampa Bay Lightning: Adrian Aucoin; 2nd-round pick in 2001	
February 15, 2001	To Vancouver Canucks: Future considerations (Note: 3rd-round pick in 2002)	To Los Angeles Kings: Felix Potvin	
March 9, 2001	To Vancouver Canucks: Drake Berehowsky	To Nashville Predators: Atlanta’s 2nd-round pick in 2001	
May 31, 2001	To Vancouver Canucks: Rights to Alex Auld	To Florida Panthers: 2nd-round pick in 2001; 3rd-round pick in 2002	

=== Players acquired ===
Date	Player	Former team	Term	Via	Ref
July 26, 2000	Bob Essensa	Phoenix Coyotes		Free agency	
August 14, 2000	Scott Lachance	Montreal Canadiens		Free agency	
August 21, 2000	Bryan Helmer	St. Louis Blues		Free agency	
August 21, 2000	Sean Tallaire	Utah Grizzlies (IHL)		Free agency	
September 5, 2000	Dody Wood	Kansas City Blades (IHL)		Free agency	
September 6, 2000	Johan Davidsson	New York Islanders		Free agency	

=== Players lost ===
Date	Player	New team	Via (Note: In parentheses is the player's free agency group on July 1 if applicable.)	Ref
N/A	Stewart Bodtker	Trenton Titans (ECHL)	Free agency (UFA)	
N/A	Paul Ferone	Belfast Giants (BISL)	Free agency (UFA)	
June 19, 2000	Martin Gendron	Frankfurt Lions (DEL)	Free agency (VI)	
June 23, 2000	Darby Hendrickson	Minnesota Wild	Expansion draft	
June 23, 2000	Stefan Nilsson	Minnesota Wild	Expansion draft	
July 1, 2000	Tim Keyes (Note: Keyes retired.)		Contract expiration (UFA)	
July 1, 2000	Harry York (Note: York retired.)		Contract expiration (UFA)	
July 6, 2000	Brian Bonin	Minnesota Wild	Free agency (VI)	
July 13, 2000	Mark Messier	New York Rangers	Free agency (III)	
July 20, 2000	Chris O'Sullivan	Anaheim Mighty Ducks	Free agency (VI)	
August 10, 2000	Chad Allan	St. John's Maple Leafs (AHL)	Free agency (UFA)	
October 2000	Mike Valley	Louisiana IceGators (ECHL)	Free agency (UFA)	
October 3, 2000	Garth Snow	Wilkes-Barre/Scranton Penguins (AHL)	Free agency (UFA)	

=== Signings ===
Date	Player	Term	Contract type	Ref
June 28, 2000	Jeff Scissons		Entry-level	
July 20, 2000	Corey Schwab		Re-signing	
July 25, 2000	Jarkko Ruutu		Re-signing	
August 23, 2000	Felix Potvin		Re-signing	
September 1, 2000	Brendan Morrison	2-year	Re-signing	
September 20, 2000	Donald Brashear		Re-signing	
September 26, 2000	Brent Sopel		Re-signing	
October 20, 2000	Trent Klatt	2-year	Extension	
December 6, 2000	Rene Vydareny		Entry-level	
April 26, 2001	Jarkko Ruutu		Extension	
June 1, 2001	Kevin Swanson		Entry-level	

== Draft picks ==
Vancouver's draft picks at the 2000 NHL entry draft held at the Pengrowth Saddledome in Calgary, Alberta.

Round	#	Player	Nationality	College/Junior/Club team (League)
1	23	Nathan Smith	Canada	Swift Current Broncos (WHL)
3	71	Thatcher Bell	Canada	Rimouski Oceanic (QMJHL)
3	93	Tim Branham	United States	Barrie Colts (OHL)
5	144	Pavel Duma	Russia	Neftekhimik Nizhnekamsk (Russia)
7	208	Brandon Reid	Canada	Halifax Mooseheads (QMJHL)
8	241	Nathan Barrett	Canada	Lethbridge Hurricanes (WHL)
9	272	Tim Smith	Canada	Spokane Chiefs (WHL)

== See also ==
- 2000–01 NHL season
