= 2000–01 Minnesota Wild season =

National Hockey League team season

2000–01 Minnesota Wild
- Division: 5th Northwest
- Conference: 14th Western
- 2000–01 record: 25–39–13–5
- Home record: 14–13–10–4
- Road record: 11–26–3–1
- Goals for: 168
- Goals against: 210

Team information
- General manager: Doug Risebrough
- Coach: Jacques Lemaire
- Captain: Rotating; Sean O'Donnell (Oct.); Scott Pellerin (Nov.); Wes Walz (Dec.); Brad Bombardir (Jan.–Feb.); Darby Hendrickson (Mar.–Apr.)
- Alternate captains: Curtis Leschyshyn (Oct.-Mar.); Sean O'Donnell (Nov.-Mar.); Scott Pellerin (Oct., Dec.-Mar.)
- Arena: Xcel Energy Center
- Average attendance: 18,328
- Minor league affiliate: Cleveland Lumberjacks

Team leaders
- Goals: Marian Gaborik, Darby Hendrickson, Wes Walz (18)
- Assists: Scott Pellerin (28)
- Points: Scott Pellerin (39)
- Penalty minutes: Matt Johnson (137)
- Plus/minus: Scott Pellerin (+6)
- Wins: Manny Fernandez (19)
- Goals against average: Manny Fernandez (2.24)

The 2000–01 Minnesota Wild season was the team's first season of play in the National Hockey League (NHL). One of the policies that the Wild implemented was never naming a permanent captain. Instead, the team captaincy was rotated on a monthly basis among several of its players each season, with some players serving multiple times.

== Off-season ==
Jacques Lemaire was named the team’s first head coach on June 19.

== Regular season ==
The Wild struggled offensively, finishing 30th overall in scoring (168 goals for), power-play goals scored (36) and power-play percentage (9.63%). They were also shut out a league-high 14 times. Combined with the six shut-outs earned in total by goaltenders Manny Fernandez and Jamie McLennan, 20 of the Wild's 82 regular-season games ended in a shutout.

=== Final standings ===
Northwest Division
No.	CR		GP	W	L	T	OTL	GF	GA	Pts
1	1	**Colorado Avalanche**	82	52	16	10	4	270	192	118
2	6	**Edmonton Oilers**	82	39	28	12	3	243	222	93
3	8	**Vancouver Canucks**	82	36	28	11	7	239	238	90
4	11	Calgary Flames	82	27	36	15	4	197	236	73
5	14	Minnesota Wild	82	25	39	13	5	168	210	68

Note: CR = Conference rank; GP = Games played; W = Wins; L = Losses; T = Ties; OTL = Overtime loss; GF = Goals for; GA = Goals against; Pts = Points
Bolded teams qualified for the playoffs.

Western Conference
R		Div	GP	W	L	T	OTL	GF	GA	Pts
**1**	**p – Colorado Avalanche**	**NW**	**82**	**52**	**16**	**10**	**4**	**270**	**192**	**118**
**2**	**y – Detroit Red Wings**	**CEN**	**82**	**49**	**20**	**9**	**4**	**253**	**202**	**111**
**3**	**y – Dallas Stars**	**PAC**	**82**	**48**	**24**	**8**	**2**	**241**	**187**	**106**
**4**	**St. Louis Blues**	**CEN**	**82**	**43**	**22**	**12**	**5**	**249**	**195**	**103**
**5**	**San Jose Sharks**	**PAC**	**82**	**40**	**27**	**12**	**3**	**217**	**192**	**95**
**6**	**Edmonton Oilers**	**NW**	**82**	**39**	**28**	**12**	**3**	**243**	**222**	**93**
**7**	**Los Angeles Kings**	**PAC**	**82**	**38**	**28**	**13**	**3**	**252**	**228**	**92**
**8**	**Vancouver Canucks**	**NW**	**82**	**36**	**28**	**11**	**7**	**239**	**238**	**90**
8.5
9	Phoenix Coyotes	PAC	82	35	27	17	3	214	212	90
10	Nashville Predators	CEN	82	34	36	9	3	186	200	80
11	Calgary Flames	NW	82	27	36	15	4	197	236	73
12	Chicago Blackhawks	CEN	82	29	40	8	5	210	246	71
13	Columbus Blue Jackets	CEN	82	28	39	9	6	190	233	71
14	Minnesota Wild	NW	82	25	39	13	5	168	210	68
15	Mighty Ducks of Anaheim	PAC	82	25	41	11	5	188	245	66

Divisions: CEN – Central, PAC – Pacific, NW – Northwest

bold – Qualified for playoffs; p – Won Presidents' Trophy; y – Won division

== Schedule and results ==
2000–01 regular season
October: 2–7–3–0 (home: 2–3–2–0; road: 0–4–1–0)

Game	Date	Score	Opponent	Record	Recap
1	October 6, 2000	1–3	@ Mighty Ducks of Anaheim (2000–01)	0–1–0–0	L
2	October 7, 2000	1–4	@ Phoenix Coyotes (2000–01)	0–2–0–0	L
3	October 11, 2000	3–3 OT	Philadelphia Flyers (2000–01)	0–2–1–0	T
4	October 13, 2000	0–2	@ St. Louis Blues (2000–01)	0–3–1–0	L
5	October 15, 2000	3–5	Edmonton Oilers (2000–01)	0–4–1–0	L
6	October 18, 2000	6–5	Tampa Bay Lightning (2000–01)	1–4–1–0	W
7	October 20, 2000	1–3	San Jose Sharks (2000–01)	1–5–1–0	L
8	October 22, 2000	0–0 OT	Florida Panthers (2000–01)	1–5–2–0	T
9	October 24, 2000	2–2 OT	@ Montreal Canadiens (2000–01)	1–5–3–0	T
10	October 25, 2000	1–6	@ Toronto Maple Leafs (2000–01)	1–6–3–0	L
11	October 27, 2000	3–1	Calgary Flames (2000–01)	2–6–3–0	W
12	October 29, 2000	2–3	Chicago Blackhawks (2000–01)	2–7–3–0	L

November: 5–7–1–1 (home: 2–2–1–1; road: 3–5–0–0)

Game	Date	Score	Opponent	Record	Recap
13	November 3, 2000	0–3	@ Edmonton Oilers (2000–01)	2–8–3–0	L
14	November 5, 2000	3–2 OT	@ Calgary Flames (2000–01)	3–8–3–0	W
15	November 7, 2000	0–2	@ Colorado Avalanche (2000–01)	3–9–3–0	L
16	November 8, 2000	0–1	Calgary Flames (2000–01)	3–10–3–0	L
17	November 10, 2000	5–2	@ Chicago Blackhawks (2000–01)	4–10–3–0	W
18	November 12, 2000	4–5 OT	Edmonton Oilers (2000–01)	4–10–3–1	OTL
19	November 15, 2000	2–3	New York Rangers (2000–01)	4–11–3–1	L
20	November 17, 2000	1–3	@ Buffalo Sabres (2000–01)	4–12–3–1	L
21	November 18, 2000	6–1	@ Boston Bruins (2000–01)	5–12–3–1	W
22	November 22, 2000	1–1 OT	Calgary Flames (2000–01)	5–12–4–1	T
23	November 24, 2000	2–0	Chicago Blackhawks (2000–01)	6–12–4–1	W
24	November 26, 2000	4–2	Vancouver Canucks (2000–01)	7–12–4–1	W
25	November 28, 2000	1–4	@ San Jose Sharks (2000–01)	7–13–4–1	L
26	November 30, 2000	0–2	@ Phoenix Coyotes (2000–01)	7–14–4–1	L

December: 5–3–3–1 (home: 3–1–3–1; road: 2–2–0–0)

Game	Date	Score	Opponent	Record	Recap
27	December 2, 2000	2–3	@ Los Angeles Kings (2000–01)	7–15–4–1	L
28	December 7, 2000	4–2	@ Chicago Blackhawks (2000–01)	8–15–4–1	W
29	December 8, 2000	0–1 OT	Mighty Ducks of Anaheim (2000–01)	8–15–4–2	OTL
30	December 10, 2000	1–2	Nashville Predators (2000–01)	8–16–4–2	L
31	December 13, 2000	1–1 OT	Carolina Hurricanes (2000–01)	8–16–5–2	T
32	December 14, 2000	1–2	@ Washington Capitals (2000–01)	8–17–5–2	L
33	December 17, 2000	6–0	Dallas Stars (2000–01)	9–17–5–2	W
34	December 20, 2000	2–2 OT	Ottawa Senators (2000–01)	9–17–6–2	T
35	December 22, 2000	4–3	Los Angeles Kings (2000–01)	10–17–6–2	W
36	December 27, 2000	5–3	@ Detroit Red Wings (2000–01)	11–17–6–2	W
37	December 29, 2000	2–2 OT	Phoenix Coyotes (2000–01)	11–17–7–2	T
38	December 31, 2000	3–2	Mighty Ducks of Anaheim (2000–01)	12–17–7–2	W

January: 6–5–1–1 (home: 4–2–1–0; road: 2–3–0–1)

Game	Date	Score	Opponent	Record	Recap
39	January 3, 2001	1–1 OT	Atlanta Thrashers (2000–01)	12–17–8–2	T
40	January 5, 2001	3–2 OT	Detroit Red Wings (2000–01)	13–17–8–2	W
41	January 6, 2001	1–5	@ St. Louis Blues (2000–01)	13–18–8–2	L
42	January 10, 2001	3–0	Washington Capitals (2000–01)	14–18–8–2	W
43	January 12, 2001	0–5	Colorado Avalanche (2000–01)	14–19–8–2	L
44	January 14, 2001	2–4	@ New York Rangers (2000–01)	14–20–8–2	L
45	January 15, 2001	0–3	@ Columbus Blue Jackets (2000–01)	14–21–8–2	L
46	January 17, 2001	3–2 OT	Columbus Blue Jackets (2000–01)	15–21–8–2	W
47	January 19, 2001	3–2	New York Islanders (2000–01)	16–21–8–2	W
48	January 21, 2001	2–4	New Jersey Devils (2000–01)	16–22–8–2	L
49	January 24, 2001	5–0	@ Mighty Ducks of Anaheim (2000–01)	17–22–8–2	W
50	January 27, 2001	4–1	@ Los Angeles Kings (2000–01)	18–22–8–2	W
51	January 30, 2001	2–3 OT	@ Vancouver Canucks (2000–01)	18–22–8–3	OTL

February: 4–7–0–0 (home: 2–2–0–0; road: 2–5–0–0)

Game	Date	Score	Opponent	Record	Recap
52	February 6, 2001	4–2	@ Tampa Bay Lightning (2000–01)	19–22–8–3	W
53	February 7, 2001	1–2	@ Florida Panthers (2000–01)	19–23–8–3	L
54	February 9, 2001	2–1	@ Dallas Stars (2000–01)	20–23–8–3	W
55	February 11, 2001	4–2	Pittsburgh Penguins (2000–01)	21–23–8–3	W
56	February 14, 2001	1–2	@ Pittsburgh Penguins (2000–01)	21–24–8–3	L
57	February 16, 2001	0–4	Los Angeles Kings (2000–01)	21–25–8–3	L
58	February 18, 2001	3–1	San Jose Sharks (2000–01)	22–25–8–3	W
59	February 21, 2001	2–6	@ Dallas Stars (2000–01)	22–26–8–3	L
60	February 23, 2001	1–4	@ Colorado Avalanche (2000–01)	22–27–8–3	L
61	February 24, 2001	1–2	@ Nashville Predators (2000–01)	22–28–8–3	L
62	February 26, 2001	2–5	Vancouver Canucks (2000–01)	22–29–8–3	L

March: 2–8–4–2 (home: 0–2–3–2; road: 2–6–1–0)

Game	Date	Score	Opponent	Record	Recap
63	March 1, 2001	1–1 OT	@ Calgary Flames (2000–01)	22–29–9–3	T
64	March 2, 2001	1–3	@ Edmonton Oilers (2000–01)	22–30–9–3	L
65	March 4, 2001	4–3 OT	@ Vancouver Canucks (2000–01)	23–30–9–3	W
66	March 6, 2001	3–3 OT	St. Louis Blues (2000–01)	23–30–10–3	T
67	March 8, 2001	2–6	@ New Jersey Devils (2000–01)	23–31–10–3	L
68	March 9, 2001	4–1	@ New York Islanders (2000–01)	24–31–10–3	W
69	March 11, 2001	2–3 OT	Detroit Red Wings (2000–01)	24–31–10–4	OTL
70	March 14, 2001	0–1 OT	St. Louis Blues (2000–01)	24–31–10–5	OTL
71	March 15, 2001	0–3	@ Philadelphia Flyers (2000–01)	24–32–10–5	L
72	March 18, 2001	3–4	@ Colorado Avalanche (2000–01)	24–33–10–5	L
73	March 19, 2001	1–4	Dallas Stars (2000–01)	24–34–10–5	L
74	March 21, 2001	0–0 OT	Nashville Predators (2000–01)	24–34–11–5	T
75	March 22, 2001	2–4	@ Detroit Red Wings (2000–01)	24–35–11–5	L
76	March 25, 2001	2–2 OT	Vancouver Canucks (2000–01)	24–35–12–5	T
77	March 28, 2001	0–2	Phoenix Coyotes (2000–01)	24–36–12–5	L
78	March 31, 2001	1–4	@ Nashville Predators (2000–01)	24–37–12–5	L

April: 1–2–1–0 (home: 1–1–0–0; road: 0–1–1–0)

Game	Date	Score	Opponent	Record	Recap
79	April 2, 2001	2–4	@ San Jose Sharks (2000–01)	24–38–12–5	L
80	April 4, 2001	2–2 OT	@ Edmonton Oilers (2000–01)	24–38–13–5	T
81	April 6, 2001	3–2	Columbus Blue Jackets (2000–01)	25–38–13–5	W
82	April 8, 2001	2–4	Colorado Avalanche (2000–01)	25–39–13–5	L

Legend: W Win (2 points) L Loss (0 points) T Tie (1 point) OTL Overtime loss (1 point)

== Player statistics ==
=== Scoring ===
- Position abbreviations: C = Center; D = Defense; G = Goaltender; LW = Left wing; RW = Right wing
- † = Joined team via a transaction (e.g., trade, waivers, signing) during the season. Stats reflect time with the Wild only.
- ‡ = Left team via a transaction (e.g., trade, waivers, release) during the season. Stats reflect time with the Wild only.

No.	Player	Pos	Regular season					
No.	Player	Pos	GP	G	A	Pts	+/-	PIM
33	Scott Pellerin‡	LW	58	11	28	39	6	45
10	Marian Gaborik	RW	71	18	18	36	−6	32
77 (Note: Sekeras wore number 6 in his first three games.)	Lubomir Sekeras	D	80	11	23	34	−8	52
37	Wes Walz	C	82	18	12	30	−8	37
17	Filip Kuba	D	75	9	21	30	−6	28
14	Darby Hendrickson	C	72	18	11	29	1	36
34	Jim Dowd	C	68	7	22	29	−6	80
24	Antti Laaksonen	LW	82	12	16	28	−7	24
22	Stacy Roest	RW	76	7	20	27	3	20
44	Aaron Gavey	C	75	10	14	24	−8	52
25	Sergei Krivokrasov	RW	54	7	15	22	−1	20
27	Sean O'Donnell‡	D	63	4	12	16	−2	128
5	Brad Bombardir	D	70	0	15	15	−6	42
21 (Note: Stewart wore number 18 in his first five games.)	Cam Stewart	LW	54	4	9	13	−3	18
20	Maxim Sushinsky	RW	30	7	4	11	−7	29
19	Jeff Nielsen	RW	59	3	8	11	−16	4
2	Willie Mitchell†	D	17	1	7	8	4	11
42	Andy Sutton	D	69	3	4	7	−11	131
3	Ladislav Benysek	D	71	2	5	7	−11	38
45	Peter Bartos	LW	13	4	2	6	2	6
16	Roman Simicek†	C	28	2	4	6	−4	21
36	Sylvain Blouin	LW	41	3	2	5	−5	117
4	Curtis Leschyshyn‡	D	54	2	3	5	−2	19
23	Pavel Patera	C	20	1	3	4	−8	4
12	Matt Johnson	LW	50	1	1	2	−6	137
16	Steve McKenna‡	LW	20	1	1	2	0	19
11	Pascal Dupuis	LW	4	1	0	1	0	4
11	Kai Nurminen	LW	2	1	0	1	−1	2
29	Jamie McLennan	G	38	0	1	1		4
40	Chris Armstrong	D	3	0	0	0	−3	0
31	Zac Bierk	G	1	0	0	0		2
32	Brian Bonin	C	7	0	0	0	−3	0
15	J. J. Daigneault	D	1	0	0	0	−1	2
35	Manny Fernandez	G	42	0	0	0		6
30	Derek Gustafson	G	4	0	0	0		0
26	Christian Matte	RW	3	0	0	0	0	2
28	Mike Matteucci	D	3	0	0	0	−2	2
6	Travis Roche†	D	1	0	0	0	0	0

=== Goaltending ===
No.	Player	Regular season									
No.	Player	GP	W	L	T	SA	GA	GAA	SV%	SO	TOI
35	Manny Fernandez	42	19	17	4	1147	92	2.24	.920	4	2461
29	Jamie McLennan	38	5	23	9	1032	98	2.64	.905	2	2230
30	Derek Gustafson	4	1	3	0	97	10	2.51	.897	0	239
31	Zac Bierk	1	0	1	0	27	6	6.00	.778	0	60

== Awards and records ==
=== Awards ===
Type	Award/honor	Recipient	Ref
Team	Three Star Award	Manny Fernandez	

=== Milestones ===
Milestone	Player	Date	Ref
First game	Marian Gaborik	October 6, 2000	
First game	Lubomir Sekeras	October 6, 2000	
First game	Maxim Sushinsky	October 6, 2000	
First game	Peter Bartos	November 10, 2000	
First game	Derek Gustafson	March 9, 2001	
First game	Chris Armstrong	March 21, 2001	
First game	Pascal Dupuis	April 2, 2001	
First game	Mike Matteucci	April 4, 2001	
First game	Travis Roche	April 8, 2001	

== Transactions ==
The Wild were involved in the following transactions through June 9, 2001, the day of the deciding game of the 2001 Stanley Cup Final.

=== Trades ===
Date	Details		Ref
June 12, 2000	To Minnesota Wild: Manny Fernandez; Brad Lukowich	To Dallas Stars: 3rd-round pick in 2000; 4th-round pick in 2002	
June 12, 2000	To Minnesota Wild: Andy Sutton; 7th-round pick in 2000; 3rd-round pick in 2001	To San Jose Sharks: 8th-round pick in 2001; Future considerations (Note: Minnesota agreed not to select Evgeni Nabokov in the expansion draft.)	
June 23, 2000	To Minnesota Wild: Rights to Dan Cavanaugh; 8th-round pick in 2000 or 2001 (Note: Minnesota chose the 2001 draft pick.)	To Calgary Flames: Mike Vernon	
June 23, 2000	To Minnesota Wild: Brad Bombardir	To New Jersey Devils: Chris Terreri; 9th-round pick in 2000	
June 23, 2000	To Minnesota Wild: Rights to Rickard Wallin	To Phoenix Coyotes: Joe Juneau	
June 25, 2000	To Minnesota Wild: Aaron Gavey; Pavel Patera; 8th-round pick in 2000; Minnesota’s 4th-round pick in 2002	To Dallas Stars: Brad Lukowich; 3rd-round pick in 2001; 9th-round pick in 2001	
September 29, 2000	To Minnesota Wild: Matt Johnson	To Atlanta Thrashers: 3rd-round pick in 2001	
January 13, 2001	To Minnesota Wild: Roman Simicek	To Pittsburgh Penguins: Steve McKenna	
March 1, 2001	To Minnesota Wild: Askhat Rakhmatullin; 3rd-round pick in 2001; Future considerations	To Carolina Hurricanes: Scott Pellerin	
March 4, 2001	To Minnesota Wild: Willie Mitchell; Future considerations	To New Jersey Devils: Sean O'Donnell	
March 13, 2001	To Minnesota Wild: 3rd-round pick in 2001; Future considerations	To Ottawa Senators: Curtis Leschyshyn	

=== Players acquired ===
Date	Player	Former team	Term	Via	Ref
May 4, 2000	Steve Aronson	University of St. Thomas (MIAC)		Free agency	
May 11, 2000	Cory Larose	University of Maine (HE)		Free agency	
May 17, 2000	Kai Nurminen	HC TPS (Liiga)		Free agency	
May 17, 2000	Brendan Walsh	University of Maine (HE)		Free agency	
June 2, 2000	Richard Park	Utah Grizzlies (IHL)		Free agency	
June 7, 2000	David Brumby	Jackson Bandits (ECHL)		Free agency	
June 7, 2000	Pete Gardiner	RPI (ECAC)		Free agency	
June 9, 2000	Randy Fitzgerald	Plymouth Whalers (OHL)		Free agency	
June 9, 2000	Derek Gustafson	St. Lawrence University (ECAC)		Free agency	
June 13, 2000	Nick Naumenko	Kansas City Blades (IHL)		Free agency	
June 28, 2000	Wes Walz	HC Lugano (NLA)		Free agency	
July 6, 2000	Brian Bonin	Vancouver Canucks		Free agency	
July 11, 2000	Christian Matte	Colorado Avalanche		Free agency	
July 13, 2000	Brett McLean	Saint John Flames (AHL)		Free agency	
July 14, 2000	Ladislav Benysek	HC Sparta Praha (ELH)		Free agency	
July 20, 2000	Antti Laaksonen	Boston Bruins		Free agency	
July 20, 2000	Mike Matteucci	Boston Bruins		Free agency	
July 24, 2000	J. J. Daigneault	Phoenix Coyotes		Free agency	
August 31, 2000	Eric Charron	Calgary Flames		Free agency	
August 31, 2000	Lawrence Nycholat	Swift Current Broncos (WHL)		Free agency	
September 18, 2000	Pascal Dupuis	Shawinigan Cataractes (QMJHL)		Free agency	
September 29, 2000	Sylvain Blouin	Montreal Canadiens		Waiver draft	
September 29, 2000	Zdeno Ciger	Nashville Predators		Waiver draft	
April 8, 2001	Travis Roche	University of North Dakota (WCHA)		Free agency	
May 30, 2001	Ravil Gusmanov	Metallurg Magnitogorsk (RSL)		Free agency	

=== Players lost ===
Date	Player	New team	Via (Note: In parentheses is the player's free agency group on July 1 if applicable.)	Ref
September 29, 2000	Jeff Odgers	Atlanta Thrashers	Waiver draft	
April 20, 2001	Kai Nurminen	HC TPS (Liiga)	Free agency	
April 24, 2001	Eric Charron	Adler Mannheim (DEL)	Free agency	

=== Signings ===
Date	Player	Term	Contract type	Ref
July 7, 2000	Peter Bartos		Entry-level	
July 14, 2000	Pavel Patera		Re-signing	
July 15, 2000	Marian Gaborik	3-year	Entry-level	
July 15, 2000	Maxim Sushinsky	multi-year	Entry-level	
July 26, 2000	Sergei Krivokrasov		Re-signing	
July 29, 2000	Scott Pellerin		Re-signing	
July 31, 2000	Darryl Laplante		Re-signing	
July 31, 2000	Andy Sutton		Re-signing	
August 1, 2000	Zac Bierk		Re-signing	
August 1, 2000	Filip Kuba		Re-signing	
August 16, 2000	Lubomir Sekeras		Entry-level	
September 23, 2000	Nick Schultz	multi-year	Entry-level	
May 2, 2001	Erik Reitz	multi-year	Entry-level	
June 7, 2001	Wes Walz	multi-year	Extension	

== Draft picks ==
=== NHL expansion draft ===
#	Player	Drafted from
2.	Jamie McLennan (G)	St. Louis Blues
3.	Mike Vernon (G)	Florida Panthers
6.	Chris Terreri (G)	New Jersey Devils
7.	Sean O'Donnell (D)	Los Angeles Kings
10.	Curtis Leschyshyn (D)	Carolina Hurricanes
12.	Ladislav Benysek (D)	Mighty Ducks of Anaheim
13.	Chris Armstrong (D)	San Jose Sharks
15.	Filip Kuba (D)	Calgary Flames
18.	Oleg Orekhovsky (D)	Washington Capitals
20.	Ian Herbers (D)	New York Islanders
21.	Artem Anisimov (D)	Philadelphia Flyers
24.	Stacy Roest (C)	Detroit Red Wings
25.	Darryl Laplante (C)	Detroit Red Wings
27.	Scott Pellerin (LW)	St. Louis Blues
30.	Jim Dowd (C)	Edmonton Oilers
32.	Sergei Krivokrasov (RW)	Calgary Flames
33.	Jeff Nielsen (RW)	Mighty Ducks of Anaheim
35.	Jeff Odgers (RW)	Colorado Avalanche
37.	Steve McKenna (F)	Los Angeles Kings
40.	Michal Bros (F)	San Jose Sharks
41.	Joe Juneau (C)	Ottawa Senators
43.	Darby Hendrickson (C)	Vancouver Canucks
46.	Jeff Daw (C)	Chicago Blackhawks
48.	Stefan Nilsson (F)	Vancouver Canucks
49.	Zac Bierk (G)	Tampa Bay Lightning
51.	Cam Stewart (LW)	Florida Panthers

=== NHL entry draft ===
Minnesota's draft picks at the 2000 NHL entry draft held at the Pengrowth Saddledome in Calgary, Alberta.

Round	Pick	Player	Nationality	College/junior/club team
1	3	Marian Gaborik (RW)	Slovakia	Dukla Trenčín Jr. (Slovakia)
2	33	Nick Schultz (D)	Canada	Prince Albert Raiders (WHL)
4	99	Marc Cavosie (C/LW)	United States	Rensselaer Polytechnic Institute (ECAC)
5	132	Maxim Sushinsky (W)	Russia	Avangard Omsk (RSL)
6	170	Erik Reitz (D)	United States	Barrie Colts (OHL)
7	199	Brian Passmore (C)	Canada	Ottawa 67's (OHL)
7	214	Peter Bartos (LW)	Slovakia	HC České Budějovice (Czech Extraliga)
8	232	Lubomir Sekeras (D)	Slovakia	Oceláři Třinec (Czech Extraliga)
8	255	Eric Johansson (C)	Canada	Tri-City Americans (WHL)
