= John Emmons =

American ice hockey player (born 1974)

- Born: August 17, 1974 (age 52) San Jose, California, U.S.
- Height: 6 ft 0 in (183 cm)
- Weight: 185 lb (84 kg; 13 st 3 lb)
- Position: Center
- Shot: Left
- Played for: Ottawa Senators; Tampa Bay Lightning; Boston Bruins; Eisbären Berlin
- NHL draft: 122nd overall, 1993; Calgary Flames
- Playing career: 1996–2003

John Thomas Emmons (born August 17, 1974) is an American former professional ice hockey center who played in the National Hockey League for the Ottawa Senators, Tampa Bay Lightning and the Boston Bruins between 1999 and 2002.

== Personal life ==
Emmons was born in San Jose, California, but grew up in New Canaan, Connecticut. Emmons currently resides in Washington, Michigan.

== Playing career ==
Emmons was drafted 122nd overall by the Calgary Flames in the 1993 NHL entry draft. He then played four seasons for Yale University before turning professional with the Dayton Bombers of the ECHL in 1996. Emmons played 85 games in the NHL and scored 2 goals and 4 assists for 6 points and picking up 64 penalty minutes.

He also had a spell in Germany's Deutsche Eishockey Liga with Eisbären Berlin in 2002–2003.

== International career ==
Emmons made his international debut at the 1993 World Junior Ice Hockey Championships in Gavle, Sweden playing in 7 games but scoring no points. The next year, he returned to captain the United States men's national junior ice hockey team at the next year's 1994 World Junior Ice Hockey Championships. This time around, he scored 3 goals and 3 assists in 7 games.

=== Career statistics ===
			Regular season					Playoffs
Season	Team	League	GP	G	A	Pts	PIM	GP	G	A	Pts	PIM
1992–93	Yale University	NCAA	28	3	5	8	66	—	—	—	—	—
1993–94	Yale University	NCAA	24	5	12	17	76	—	—	—	—	—
1994–95	Yale University	NCAA	28	4	16	20	57	—	—	—	—	—
1995–96	Yale University	NCAA	31	8	20	28	124	11	0	2	2	2
1996–97	Dayton Bombers	ECHL	69	20	37	57	62	4	0	1	1	2
1996–97	Fort Wayne Komets	IHL	1	0	0	0	0	—	—	—	—	—
1997–98	Michigan K-Wings	IHL	81	9	25	34	85	4	1	1	2	10
1998–99	Detroit Vipers	IHL	75	13	22	35	172	11	4	5	9	22
1999–2000	Grand Rapids Griffins	IHL	64	10	16	26	78	16	1	4	5	28
1999–00	Ottawa Senators	NHL	10	0	0	0	6	—	—	—	—	—
2000–01	Grand-Rapids Griffins	IHL	9	1	0	1	4	—	—	—	—	—
2000–01	Ottawa Senators	NHL	41	1	1	2	20	—	—	—	—	—
2000–01	Tampa Bay Lightning	NHL	12	1	1	2	22	—	—	—	—	—
2001–02	Providence Bruins	AHL	46	4	8	12	32	2	1	1	2	0
2001–02	Boston Bruins	NHL	22	0	2	2	16	—	—	—	—	—
2002–03	Eisbären Berlin	DEL	29	2	7	9	49	9	3	2	5	4
NHL totals			85	2	4	6	64	—	—	—	—	—
NCAA totals			111	20	53	73	380	—	—	—	—	—
IHL totals			230	33	63	96	339	31	6	10	16	60
