= Craig Millar (ice hockey) =

Canadian ice hockey player

- Born: July 12, 1976 (age 50) Winnipeg, Manitoba, Canada
- Height: 6 ft 2 in (188 cm)
- Weight: 200 lb (91 kg; 14 st 4 lb)
- Position: Defense
- Shot: Left
- Played for: Edmonton Oilers; Nashville Predators; Tampa Bay Lightning
- NHL draft: 225th overall, 1994; Buffalo Sabres
- Playing career: 1996–2002

Craig Millar (born July 12, 1976) is a Canadian former professional ice hockey defenseman who played in the NHL with the Edmonton Oilers, Nashville Predators, and Tampa Bay Lightning.

Born in Winnipeg, Manitoba, Millar was drafted by the Buffalo Sabres in the 9th round, 225th overall in the 1994 NHL entry draft while playing for the Swift Current Broncos of the WHL. After being drafted Millar returned to the Broncos and played another 2 seasons with the team, scoring 77 points in 72 games his final season with the team.

For the 1996–97 season Millar turned pro and joined the Rochester Americans, the Sabres minor league affiliate. After 64 games with the Americans, Millar was traded along with Barrie Moore to the Edmonton Oilers for Miroslav Satan. Millar made his NHL Debut with the Oilers that year, appearing in 1 game. The next 2 seasons saw Millar split time between the Oilers and their minor league affiliate Hamilton Bulldogs.

Prior to the 1999–2000 season, Millar was traded to the Nashville Predators for a 3rd round draft pick (which would turn out to be Mike Comrie). That year he enjoyed his best NHL season, appearing in 57 games and scoring 14 points. The following season Millar played part of the year in the minors and 5 games with the Predators before being released. He was picked up by the Tampa Bay Lightning and played 16 games with the team.

For the 2001–02 season Millar played briefly in Germany and Slovakia before retiring in 2002.

== Career statistics ==
=== Regular season and playoffs ===
			Regular season					Playoffs
Season	Team	League	GP	G	A	Pts	PIM	GP	G	A	Pts	PIM
1992–93	Swift Current Broncos	WHL	42	2	1	3	8	—	—	—	—	—
1993–94	Swift Current Broncos	WHL	66	2	9	11	53	7	0	3	3	4
1994–95	Swift Current Broncos	WHL	72	8	42	50	80	6	1	1	2	10
1995–96	Swift Current Broncos	WHL	72	31	46	77	151	6	1	0	1	22
1996–97	Rochester Americans	AHL	64	7	18	25	65	—	—	—	—	—
1996–97	Hamilton Bulldogs	AHL	10	1	3	4	10	22	4	4	8	21
1996–97	Edmonton Oilers	NHL	1	0	0	0	2	—	—	—	—	—
1997–98	Hamilton Bulldogs	AHL	60	10	22	32	113	9	3	1	4	22
1997–98	Edmonton Oilers	NHL	11	4	0	4	8	—	—	—	—	—
1998–99	Hamilton Bulldogs	AHL	43	3	17	20	38	11	1	5	6	18
1998–99	Edmonton Oilers	NHL	24	0	2	2	19	—	—	—	—	—
1999–00	Milwaukee Admirals	IHL	8	1	5	6	6	—	—	—	—	—
1999–00	Nashville Predators	NHL	57	3	11	14	28	—	—	—	—	—
2000–01	Detroit Vipers	IHL	11	0	2	2	32	—	—	—	—	—
2000–01	Nashville Predators	NHL	5	0	0	0	6	—	—	—	—	—
2000–01	Grand Rapids Griffins	IHL	12	1	2	3	2	—	—	—	—	—
2000–01	Tampa Bay Lightning	NHL	16	1	1	2	10	—	—	—	—	—
2001–02	Regensburg EV	DEL2	18	5	5	10	122	10	3	5	8	38
2001–02	Bratislava Slovan	SVK	10	0	0	0	8	—	—	—	—	—
NHL totals			736	72	76	148	1534	23	0	2	2	61

== Awards ==
- 1996: WHL East First All-Star Team
- 1997: AHL All-Rookie Team
