= Joel Kwiatkowski =

Canadian ice hockey player (born 1977)

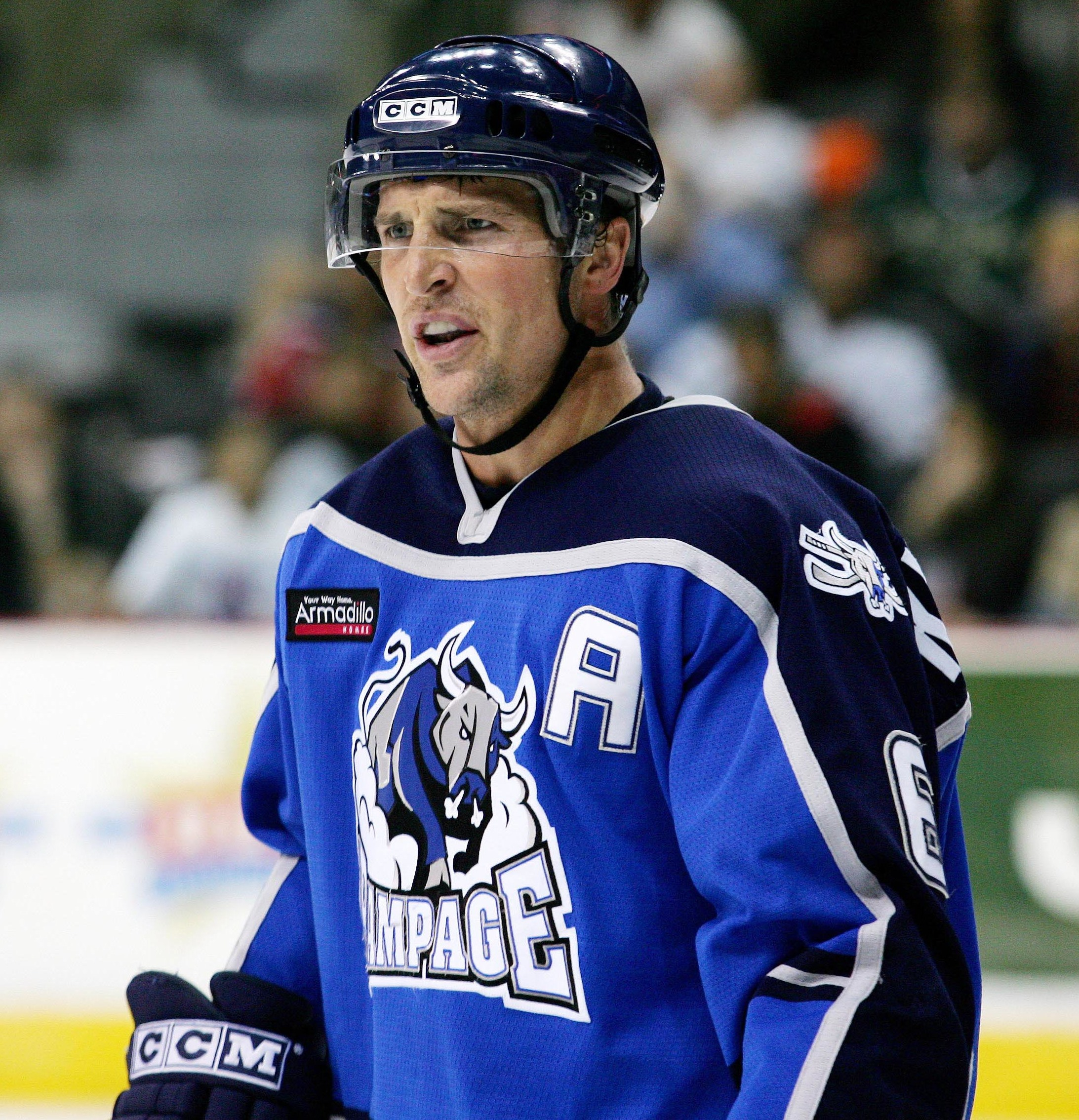
- Kwiatkowski with the San Antonio Rampage in 2004
- Born: March 22, 1977 (age 49) Kindersley, Saskatchewan, Canada
- Height: 6 ft 0 in (183 cm)
- Weight: 203 lb (92 kg; 14 st 7 lb)
- Position: Defence
- Shot: Left
- Played for: Ottawa Senators; Washington Capitals; Florida Panthers; Pittsburgh Penguins; Atlanta Thrashers; Severstal Cherepovets; SKA St. Petersburg; SC Bern; HC Fribourg-Gottéron; Modo Hockey
- National team: Canada
- NHL draft: 194th overall, 1996; Dallas Stars
- Playing career: 1998–2016

Joel Kwiatkowski (born March 22, 1977) is a Canadian former professional ice hockey defenceman. Kwiatkowski played 282 games in the National Hockey League (NHL).

== Playing career ==
Kwiatkowski was drafted in the eighth round, 194th overall by the Dallas Stars in the 1996 NHL entry draft. After finishing junior hockey, he signed with the Mighty Ducks of Anaheim as a free-agent, but never played in the NHL for the Ducks, instead he spent two seasons with the Cincinnati Mighty Ducks of the American Hockey League. He was traded to the Ottawa Senators for Patrick Traverse in 2000 and played a handful of games with the Sens. As well as that, he was a key player in the IHL with the Grand Rapids Griffins, becoming an all-star in 2001.

After three seasons with the Senators organization, he was traded to the Washington Capitals for a ninth-round draft pick in the 2003 draft (a draft pick traded back to Washington just months later). He played much more ice time in his one full season with the Capitals, playing 80 games and scoring 6 goals and 12 points. He signed with the Florida Panthers in 2004, but spent the season with the San Antonio Rampage due to the NHL Lockout which cancelled the 2004–05 season. He was later loaned to the St. John's Maple Leafs for a run in the playoffs. When the lock-out was resolved, he finally played for the Panthers and in 73 games, he tied his NHL best of 12 points and scored 10 points in 41 games before being dealt to the Pittsburgh Penguins where he played just one game.

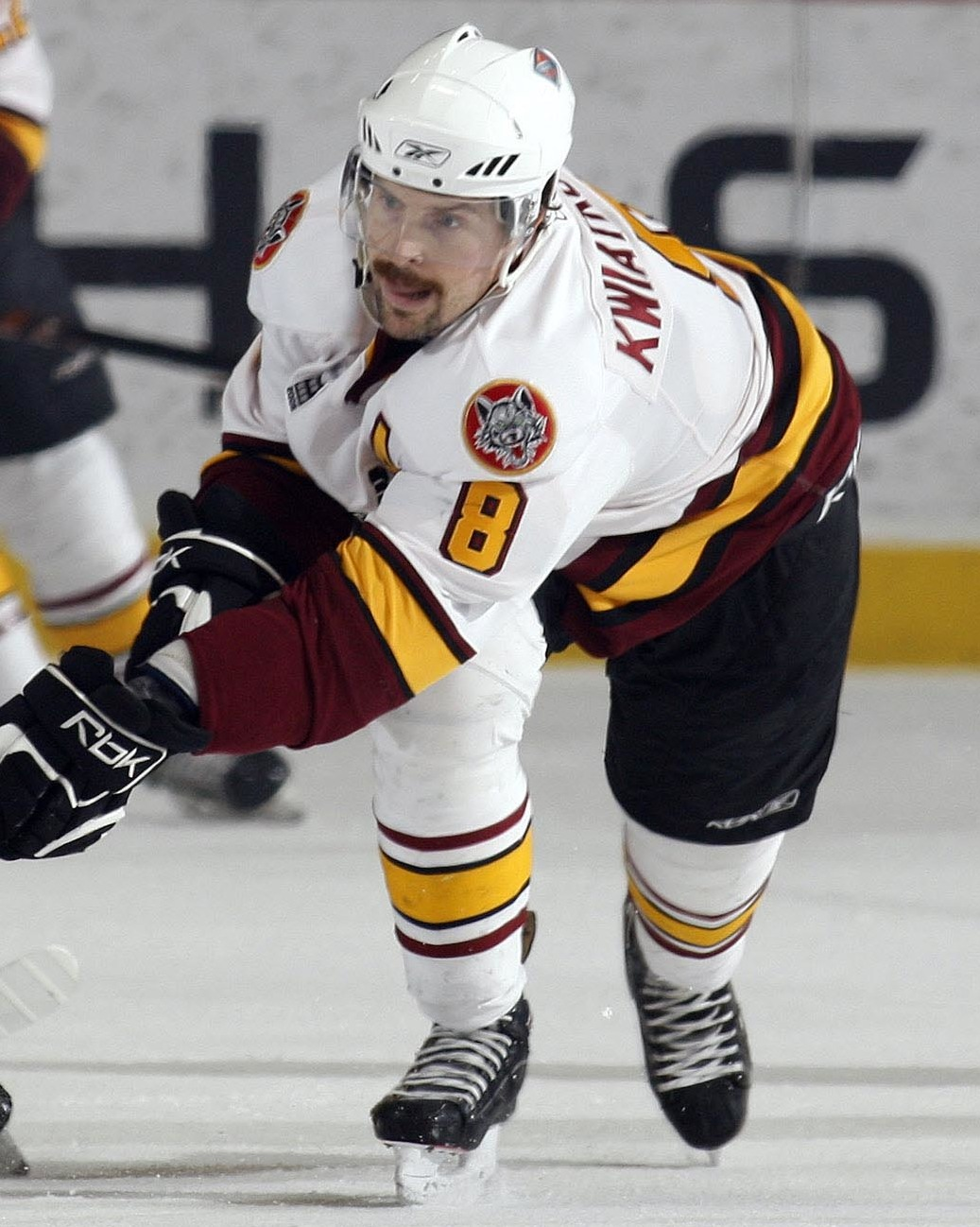
Kwiatkowski with the Chicago Wolves in 2008

He signed with the Atlanta Thrashers on August 30, 2007 as a free-agent and was assigned to the Chicago Wolves. He played one season in Chicago before going to the Kontinental Hockey League where he spent the 2008–09 season playing for the Severstal Cherepovets. He remained in the KHL for the 2009–10 season with SKA St. Petersburg.

Kwiatkowski moved to the Swiss National League and first played for SC Bern from 2010–2012 before transferring to HC Fribourg-Gottéron for the 2012–13 season compiling 23 points in 46 games.

In his final professional season in 2015–16, Kwiatkowski opted to play in the Swedish Hockey League with Modo Hockey. Unable to help Modo avoid relegation, he produced 5 points in 42 games from the blueline.

On September 12, 2016, Kwiatkowski confirmed the end of his playing career in accepting an assistant coaching position with the Kalamazoo Wings of the ECHL.

== International play ==
Medal record

Ice hockey

Representing Canada

IIHF World Championship
Silver medal – second place	2009 Switzerland	

Kwiatkowski was a member of Team Canada at the 2009 IIHF World Championship in Switzerland. Named to the alternate roster on April 13, 2009, Team Canada GM Doug Armstrong activated the journeyman defenceman to suit up for the tournament game against Slovakia on April 28, 2009.

== Career statistics ==
=== Regular season and playoffs ===
			Regular season					Playoffs
Season	Team	League	GP	G	A	Pts	PIM	GP	G	A	Pts	PIM
1994–95	Tacoma Rockets	WHL	70	4	13	17	66	4	0	0	0	2
1995–96	Kelowna Rockets	WHL	40	6	17	23	85	—	—	—	—	—
1995–96	Prince George Cougars	WHL	32	6	11	17	48	—	—	—	—	—
1996–97	Prince George Cougars	WHL	72	16	36	52	94	15	4	2	6	24
1997–98	Prince George Cougars	WHL	62	21	43	64	65	11	3	6	9	6
1998–99	Cincinnati Mighty Ducks	AHL	80	12	21	33	48	3	2	0	2	0
1999–00	Cincinnati Mighty Ducks	AHL	70	4	22	26	28	—	—	—	—	—
2000–01	Ottawa Senators	NHL	4	1	0	1	0	—	—	—	—	—
2000–01	Grand Rapids Griffins	IHL	77	4	17	21	58	10	1	0	1	4
2001–02	Ottawa Senators	NHL	11	0	0	0	12	—	—	—	—	—
2001–02	Grand Rapids Griffins	AHL	65	8	21	29	94	5	1	2	3	12
2002–03	Binghamton Senators	AHL	1	0	0	0	2	—	—	—	—	—
2002–03	Ottawa Senators	NHL	20	0	2	2	6	—	—	—	—	—
2002–03	Washington Capitals	NHL	34	0	3	3	12	6	0	0	0	2
2003–04	Washington Capitals	NHL	80	6	6	12	89	—	—	—	—	—
2004–05	San Antonio Rampage	AHL	64	13	19	32	76	—	—	—	—	—
2004–05	St. John's Maple Leafs	AHL	17	7	6	13	16	5	0	4	4	23
2005–06	Florida Panthers	NHL	73	4	8	12	86	—	—	—	—	—
2006–07	Florida Panthers	NHL	41	5	5	10	20	—	—	—	—	—
2006–07	Pittsburgh Penguins	NHL	1	0	0	0	0	—	—	—	—	—
2007–08	Chicago Wolves	AHL	59	21	29	50	119	24	10	13	23	30
2007–08	Atlanta Thrashers	NHL	18	0	5	5	20	—	—	—	—	—
2008–09	Severstal Cherepovets	KHL	52	13	12	25	64	—	—	—	—	—
2009–10	SKA Saint Petersburg	KHL	50	7	12	19	147	4	0	0	0	10
2010–11	SC Bern	NLA	35	9	9	18	20	10	0	4	4	34
2011–12	SC Bern	NLA	42	8	12	20	52	14	2	2	4	16
2012–13	HC Fribourg-Gottéron	NLA	46	14	9	23	81	18	1	5	6	18
2013–14	HC Fribourg-Gottéron	NLA	49	5	17	22	54	10	2	3	5	8
2014–15	HC Fribourg-Gottéron	NLA	42	3	10	13	67	—	—	—	—	—
2015–16	Modo Hockey	SHL	42	2	3	5	30	—	—	—	—	—
NHL totals			282	16	29	45	245	6	0	0	0	2

=== International ===
Year	Team	Event	Result	GP	G	A	Pts	PIM
2009	Canada	WC	2nd place, silver medalist(s)	5	0	0	0	2
Senior totals				5	0	0	0	2

== Awards and achievements ==
- Named to the WHL West Second All-Star Team in 1997
- Named to the WHL West First All-Star Team in 1998
