= 2000 NHL entry draft =

2000 North American ice hockey draft

General information
- Date: June 24–25, 2000
- Location: Pengrowth Saddledome; Calgary, Alberta, Canada

Overview
- 293 total selections in 9 rounds
- First selection: (United States) Rick DiPietro (New York Islanders)
- Hall of Famers: 1: G Henrik Lundqvist

The 2000 NHL entry draft was the 38th draft for the National Hockey League. It was held on June 24 and 25, 2000, at the Pengrowth Saddledome in Calgary, following the 2000 NHL expansion draft on June 23, for the Columbus Blue Jackets and Minnesota Wild. This was the second NHL entry draft in which a goaltender was taken first overall (at that point), when the New York Islanders selected Rick DiPietro with the first overall pick. Previously, Michel Plasse was selected first overall in the 1968 NHL amateur draft.

Twelve players from this draft have won one or more Stanley Cup in their careers – Justin Williams, Ron Hainsey, Antoine Vermette, Marian Gaborik, Brooks Orpik, Niklas Kronwall, Travis Moen, Niclas Wallin, Mike Rupp, Andreas Lilja, Tomas Kopecky, and Ilya Bryzgalov.

The last active players in the NHL from this draft class were Deryk Engelland, Ron Hainsey, Henrik Lundqvist and Justin Williams, who all played their last NHL games in the 2019–20 season.

== Selections by round ==
Club teams are located in North America unless otherwise noted.

=== Round one ===
= NHL All-Star team ·	= NHL All-Star (Note: Players are identified as an All-Star if they were selected for the All-Star game at any time in their career.) ·	= NHL All-Star and NHL All-Star team ·	= Hall of Famers

Pick	Player	Nationality	NHL team	College/junior/club team
1	Rick DiPietro (G)	United States	New York Islanders	Boston University (Hockey East)
2	Dany Heatley (LW)	Canada	Atlanta Thrashers	University of Wisconsin–Madison (WCHA)
3	Marian Gaborik (RW)	Slovakia	Minnesota Wild	Dukla Trencin Jr. (Slovakia)
4	Rostislav Klesla (D)	Czech Republic	Columbus Blue Jackets	Brampton Battalion (OHL)
5	Raffi Torres (LW)	Canada	New York Islanders (from Tampa Bay)^{1}	Brampton Battalion (OHL)
6	Scott Hartnell (RW)	Canada	Nashville Predators	Prince Albert Raiders (WHL)
7	Lars Jonsson (D)	Sweden	Boston Bruins	Leksands IF Jr. (Sweden)
8	Nikita Alexeev (RW)	Russia	Tampa Bay Lightning (from New York Rangers)^{2}	Erie Otters (OHL)
9	Brent Krahn (G)	Canada	Calgary Flames	Calgary Hitmen (WHL)
10	Mikhail Yakubov (C)	Russia	Chicago Blackhawks	Lada Togliatti (Russia)
11	Pavel Vorobiev (RW)	Russia	Chicago Blackhawks (from Vancouver)^{3}	Lokomotiv Yaroslavl (Russia)
12	Alexei Smirnov (LW)	Russia	Mighty Ducks of Anaheim	THK Tver (Russia)
13	Ron Hainsey (D)	United States	Montreal Canadiens	University of Massachusetts Lowell (Hockey East)
14	Vaclav Nedorost (C)	Czech Republic	Colorado Avalanche (from Carolina)^{4}	Ceske Budejovice Jr. (Czech Republic)
15	Artyom Kryukov	Russia	Buffalo Sabres	Lokomotiv Yaroslavl (Russia)
16	Marcel Hossa (C)	Slovakia	Montreal Canadiens (from San Jose)^{5}	Portland Winterhawks (WHL)
17	Alexei Mikhnov	Russia	Edmonton Oilers	Lokomotiv Yaroslavl (Russia)
18	Brooks Orpik (D)	United States	Pittsburgh Penguins	Boston College (Hockey East)
19	Krys Kolanos (C)	Canada	Phoenix Coyotes	Boston College (Hockey East)
20	Alexander Frolov (LW)	Russia	Los Angeles Kings	Lokomotiv Yaroslavl (Russia)
21	Anton Volchenkov (D)	Russia	Ottawa Senators	CSKA Moscow (Russia)
22	David Hale (D)	United States	New Jersey Devils (from Colorado)^{6}	Sioux City Musketeers (USHL)
23	Nathan Smith (C)	Canada	Vancouver Canucks (from Florida)^{7}	Swift Current Broncos (WHL)
24	Brad Boyes (C)	Canada	Toronto Maple Leafs	Erie Otters (OHL)
25	Steve Ott (C)	Canada	Dallas Stars	Windsor Spitfires (OHL)
26	Brian Sutherby (C)	Canada	Washington Capitals	Moose Jaw Warriors (WHL)
27	Martin Samuelsson (RW)	Sweden	Boston Bruins (from New Jersey via Colorado)^{8}	MODO Jr. (Sweden)
28	Justin Williams (RW)	Canada	Philadelphia Flyers (from Philadelphia via Tampa Bay, compensatory)^{9}	Plymouth Whalers (OHL)
29	Niklas Kronwall (D)	Sweden	Detroit Red Wings	Djurgardens IF (Sweden)
30	Jeff Taffe (C)	United States	St. Louis Blues	University of Minnesota (WCHA)

1. Tampa Bay's first-round pick went to the Islanders as the result of a trade on June 24, 2000, that sent Kevin Weekes, the rights to Kristian Kudroc and a second-round pick in the 2001 entry draft to Tampa Bay in exchange for a fourth and seven-round picks in the 2000 Entry Draft along with this pick.
2. The Rangers' first-round pick went to Tampa Bay as the result of a trade on June 26, 1999, that sent a first-round pick in the 1999 entry draft to the Rangers in exchange for Dan Cloutier, Niklas Sundstrom, a third-round pick in the 2000 Entry Draft and this pick.
3. Vancouver first-round pick went to Chicago as the result of a trade on June 25, 1999, that sent a first-round pick in the 1999 entry draft to Vancouver in exchange for Bryan McCabe and Chicago's option of a first-round pick in the 2000 Entry Draft (this pick) or 2001 entry draft.
4. Carolina's first-round pick went to Colorado as the result of a trade on June 24, 2000, that sent Sandis Ozolinsh and a second-round pick (# 32 overall) in the 2000 Entry Draft to Carolina in exchange for Nolan Pratt, two second-round picks in the 2000 Entry Draft (# 47 and # 63 overall) and this pick.
5. San Jose's first-round pick went to Montreal as the result of a trade on March 23, 1999, that sent Vincent Damphousse to San Jose in exchange for a fifth-round pick in the 2000 Entry Draft, San Jose's option of a second-round pick in the 2000 Entry Draft or 2001 entry draft and this pick.
6. Colorado's first-round pick went to New Jersey as the result of a trade on November 3, 1999, that sent Brian Rolston to Colorado in exchange for Claude Lemieux and a conditional pick in the 2000 Entry Draft. New Jersey also had an option to swap first-round picks in the 2000 Entry Draft (this pick).
7. Florida's first-round pick went to Vancouver as the result of a trade on January 17, 1999, that sent Pavel Bure, Brad Ference, Bret Hedican and an option of a third-round pick in the 1999 entry draft or 2000 Entry Draft to Florida in exchange for Mike Brown, Dave Gagner, Ed Jovanovski, Kevin Weekes and an option of a first-round pick in the 1999 entry draft or 2000 Entry Draft (this pick). The option was at Florida's discretion.
8. Colorado's acquired first-round pick went to Boston as the result of a trade on March 6, 2000, that sent Dave Andreychuk and Ray Bourque to Colorado in exchange for Martin Grenier, Samuel Påhlsson, Brian Rolston and a Boston option of a first-round pick in the 2000 Entry Draft (this pick) or 2001 entry draft.
  Colorado's previously acquired this pick as the result of a trade on November 3, 1999, that sent Claude Lemieux and a conditional pick in the 2000 Entry Draft to New Jersey in exchange for Brian Rolston. New Jersey also had an option to swap first-round picks in the 2000 Entry Draft (this pick).
9. Philadelphia's first-round pick was re-acquired as the result of a trade on August 20, 1997, that sent Karl Dykhuis and Mikael Renberg to Tampa Bay in exchange for first-round picks in the 1998 entry draft, 1999 entry draft and 2001 entry draft along with this pick.
  Tampa Bay previously acquired this pick along with first-round picks in the 1998 entry draft, 1999 entry draft and 2001 entry draft as compensation on August 20, 1997, after Philadelphia signed Group II free agent Chris Gratton.

=== Round two ===
Pick	Player	Nationality	NHL team	College/junior/club team
31	Ilya Nikulin (D)	Russia	Atlanta Thrashers	HC MVD Tver (Russia)
32	Tomas Kurka (LW)	Czech Republic	Carolina Hurricanes (from Columbus via Colorado)^{1}	Plymouth Whalers (OHL)
33	Nick Schultz (D)	Canada	Minnesota Wild	Prince Albert Raiders (WHL)
34	Ruslan Zainullin (C)	Russia	Tampa Bay Lightning	Ak Bars Kazan (Russia)
35	Brad Winchester (LW)	United States	Edmonton Oilers (from New York Islanders)^{2}	University of Wisconsin–Madison (WCHA)
36	Daniel Widing (C)	Sweden	Nashville Predators	Leksands IF Jr. (Sweden)
37	Andy Hilbert (C)	United States	Boston Bruins	University of Michigan (CCHA)
38	Tomas Kopecky (RW)	Slovakia	Detroit Red Wings (from New York Rangers)^{3}	Dukla Trencin Jr. (Slovakia)
39	Teemu Laine (RW)	Finland	New Jersey Devils (from New York Islanders; compensatory via Vancouver)^{4}	Jokerit (Finland)
40	Kurtis Foster (D)	Canada	Calgary Flames	Peterborough Petes (OHL)
41	Tero Maatta (D)	Finland	San Jose Sharks (from Chicago)^{5}	Jokerit (Finland)
42	Libor Ustrnul (D)	Czech Republic	Atlanta Thrashers (from Vancouver)^{6}	Plymouth Whalers (OHL)
43	Matt Pettinger (LW)	Canada	Washington Capitals (from Anaheim via Calgary)^{7}	Calgary Hitmen (WHL)
44	Ilya Bryzgalov (G)	Russia	Mighty Ducks of Anaheim (from Montreal)^{8}	Lada Togliatti (Russia)
45	Mathieu Chouinard (G)	Canada	Ottawa Senators (compensatory)^{9}	Shawinigan Cataractes (QMJHL)
46	Jarret Stoll (C)	Canada	Calgary Flames (from Colorado; compensatory)^{10}	Kootenay Ice (WHL)
47	Jared Aulin (C)	Canada	Colorado Avalanche (from Carolina)^{11}	Kamloops Blazers (WHL)
48	Gerard Dicaire (D)	Canada	Buffalo Sabres	Seattle Thunderbirds (WHL)
49	Jonas Nordquist (C)	Sweden	Chicago Blackhawks (from San Jose)^{12}	Leksands IF (Sweden)
50	Sergei Soin (C)	Russia	Colorado Avalanche (compensatory)^{13}	Krylya Sovetov (Russia)
51	Kris Vernarsky (C)	United States	Toronto Maple Leafs (from Edmonton)^{14}	Plymouth Whalers (OHL)
52	Shane Endicott (C)	Canada	Pittsburgh Penguins	Seattle Thunderbirds (WHL)
53	Alexander Tatarinov (RW)	Russia	Phoenix Coyotes	Lokomotiv Yaroslavl (Russia)
54	Andreas Lilja (D)	Sweden	Los Angeles Kings	MIF Redhawks (Sweden)
55	Antoine Vermette (C)	Canada	Ottawa Senators	Victoriaville Tigres (QMJHL)
56	Aleksander Suglobov (RW)	Russia	New Jersey Devils (compensatory)^{15}	Lokomotiv Yaroslavl (Russia)
57	Matt DeMarchi (D)	United States	New Jersey Devils (from Colorado)^{16}	University of Minnesota (WCHA)
58	Vladimir Sapozhnikov (D)	Russia	Florida Panthers	Metallurg Novokuznetsk (Russia)
59	Ivan Huml (LW)	Czech Republic	Boston Bruins (from Toronto)^{17}	Langley Chiefs (BCHL)
60	Dan Ellis (G)	Canada	Dallas Stars	North Bay Centennials (OHL)
61	Jakub Cutta (D)	Czech Republic	Washington Capitals	Swift Current Broncos (WHL)
62	Paul Martin (D)	United States	New Jersey Devils	Elk River High School (USHS-MN)
63	Agris Saviels (D)	Latvia	Colorado Avalanche (from Philadelphia via Carolina)^{18}	Owen Sound Attack (OHL)
64	Filip Novak (D)	Czech Republic	New York Rangers (from Detroit)^{19}	Regina Pats (WHL)
65	David Morisset (RW)	Canada	St. Louis Blues	Seattle Thunderbirds (WHL)

1. Colorado's acquired second-round pick went to Carolina as the result of a trade on June 24, 2000, that sent Nolan Pratt, a first-round and two second-round picks in the 2000 Entry Draft (# 47 and # 63 overall) to Colorado in exchange for Sandis Ozolinsh and this pick.
  Colorado previously acquired this pick as the result of a trade on June 7, 2000, that sent Marc Denis to Columbus in exchange for this pick.
2. The Islanders' second-round pick went to Edmonton as the result of a trade on June 24, 2000, that sent Roman Hamrlik to the Islanders in exchange for Eric Brewer, Josh Green and this pick.
3. The Rangers' second-round pick went to Detroit as the result of a trade on June 24, 2000, that sent a second (# 64 overall) and a third-round picks in the 2000 Entry Draft to the Rangers in exchange for this pick.
4. Vancouver's acquired second-round pick went to New Jersey as the result of a trade on January 14, 2000, that sent Vadim Sharifijanov and a third-round pick in the 2000 Entry Draft to Vancouver in exchange for New Jersey's choice to get the second-round pick in the 2000 Entry Draft of Vancouver or the Islanders (this pick) and New Jersey's choice to get the third-round pick in the 2000 Entry Draft of Atlanta or the Islanders.
  Vancouver previously acquired this pick as the result of a trade on December 19, 1999, that sent Bill Muckalt, Dave Scatchard and Kevin Weekes to the Islanders in exchange for Felix Potvin, a conditional third-round pick in the 2000 Entry Draft and this pick.
  The Islanders previously acquired this pick as compensation after the Islanders could not sign their first-round pick on the 1998 entry draft, Michael Rupp.
5. Chicago's second-round pick went to San Jose as the result of a trade on June 24, 2000, that sent a second (# 49 overall) and a third-round picks in the 2000 Entry Draft to Chicago in exchange for this pick.
6. Vancouver's second-round pick went to Atlanta as the result of a trade on June 24, 2000, that sent a second and a third-round picks in the 2001 entry draft to Vancouver in exchange for a third-round picks in the 2001 entry draft and this pick.
7. Calgary's acquired second-round pick went to Washington as the result of a trade on June 24, 2000, that sent Miika Elomo and a fourth-round pick in the 2000 Entry Draft to Calgary in exchange for this pick.
  Calgary previously acquired this pick as the result of a trade on June 10, 2000, that sent Jean-Sebastien Giguere to Anaheim in exchange for this pick.
8. Montreal's second-round pick went to Anaheim as the result of a trade on June 24, 2000, that sent third, fourth and fifth-round picks in the 2000 Entry Draft to Montreal in exchange for this pick.
9. Ottawa acquired this pick as compensation after Ottawa could not sign their first-round pick of the 1998 entry draft, Mathieu Chouinard.
10. Colorado's acquired second-round pick went to Calgary as the result of a trade on February 28, 1999, that sent Chris Dingman and Theoren Fleury to Colorado in exchange for Wade Belak, Rene Corbet and future considerations (rights to Robyn Regehr and this pick).
  Colorado acquired this pick as compensation after the Rangers signed free agent Theoren Fleury.
11. Carolina's second-round pick went to Colorado as the result of a trade on June 24, 2000, that sent Sandis Ozolinsh and a second-round pick (# 32 overall) to Carolina in exchange for Nolan Pratt, a first-round and second-round (# 63 overall) picks in the 2000 Entry Draft and this pick.
12. San Jose's second-round pick went to Chicago as the result of a trade on June 24, 2000, that sent a second-round pick (# 41 overall) in the 2000 Entry Draft to San Jose in exchange for a third-round pick and this pick.
13. Colorado acquired this pick as compensation after the Rangers signed free agent Valeri Kamensky.
14. Edmonton's second-round pick went to Toronto as the result of a trade on March 23, 1999, that sent Jason Smith to Edmonton in exchange for a fourth-round pick in the 1999 entry draft and this pick.
15. New Jersey acquired this pick as compensation after New Jersey could not sign their first-round pick of the 1998 entry draft, Mike Van Ryn.
16. Colorado's second-round pick went to New Jersey as the result of a trade on November 3, 1999, that sent Brian Rolston to Colorado in exchange for Claude Lemieux and a conditional pick in the 2000 Entry Draft (this pick). Conditions of this draft pick are unknown. New Jersey also had an option to swap first-round picks in the 2000 Entry Draft.
17. Toronto's second-round pick went to Boston as the result of a trade on October 20, 1999, that sent the right to match arbitration award of Dmitri Khristich to Toronto in exchange for this pick.
18. Carolina's acquired second-round pick went to Colorado as the result of a trade on June 24, 2000, that sent Sandis Ozolinsh and a second-round pick (# 32 overall) in the 2000 Entry Draft to Carolina in exchange for Nolan Pratt, a first-round and second-round (# 47 overall) picks in the 2000 Entry Draft and this pick.
  Carolina previously acquired this pick as the result of a trade on January 23, 2000, that sent Keith Primeau and a fifth-round pick in the 2000 Entry Draft to Philadelphia in exchange for Rod Brind'Amour, Jean-Marc Pelletier and this pick.
19. Detroit's second-round pick went to the Rangers as the result of a trade on June 24, 2000, that sent a second-round pick (# 38 overall) in the 2000 Entry Draft to Detroit in exchange for a third-round pick in the 2000 Entry Draft and this pick.

=== Round three ===
Pick	Player	Nationality	NHL team	College/junior/club team
66	Tuukka Makela (LW)	Finland	Boston Bruins (compensatory)^{1}	HIFK (Finland)
67	Max Birbraer (LW)	Israel	New Jersey Devils (from Atlanta via Vancouver)^{2}	Newmarket Hurricanes (OPJHL)
68	Joel Lundqvist (C)	Sweden	Dallas Stars (from Minnesota)^{3}	Frolunda HC (Sweden)
69	Ben Knopp (RW)	Canada	Columbus Blue Jackets	Moose Jaw Warriors (WHL)
70	Mikael Tellqvist (G)	Sweden	Toronto Maple Leafs (from Tampa Bay)^{4}	Djurgardens IF (Sweden)
71	Thatcher Bell (C)	Canada	Vancouver Canucks (from New York Islanders)^{5}	Rimouski Oceanic (QMJHL)
72	Mattias Nilsson (D)	Sweden	Nashville Predators	MODO (Sweden)
73	Sergei Zinovjev (RW)	Russia	Boston Bruins	Metallurg Novokuznetsk (Russia)
74	Igor Radulov (LW)	Russia	Chicago Blackhawks (from New York Rangers via Detroit, New York Rangers, Tampa Bay and San Jose)^{6}	Lokomotiv Yaroslavl (Russia)
75	Justin Papineau (RW)	Canada	St. Louis Blues (from Calgary)^{7}	Belleville Bulls (OHL)
76	Michael Rupp (LW)	United States	New Jersey Devils (from Chicago)^{8}	Erie Otters (OHL)
77	Robert Fried (RW)	United States	Florida Panthers (from Vancouver)^{9}	Deerfield Academy (USHS-MA)
78	Jozef Balej (RW)	Slovakia	Montreal Canadiens (from Anaheim)^{10}	Portland Winterhawks (WHL)
79	Tyler Hanchuck (D)	Canada	Montreal Canadiens	Brampton Battalion (OHL)
80	Ryan Bayda (LW)	Canada	Carolina Hurricanes	University of North Dakota (WCHA)
81	Alexander Kharitonov (RW)	Russia	Tampa Bay Lightning (from Buffalo)^{11}	Dynamo Moscow (Russia)
82	Sean O'Connor (RW)	Canada	Florida Panthers (from San Jose)^{12}	Moose Jaw Warriors (WHL)
83	Alexander Lyubimov (D)	Russia	Edmonton Oilers	CSK VVS Samara (Russia)
84	Peter Hamerlik (G)	Slovakia	Pittsburgh Penguins	HK 36 Skalica (Slovakia)
85	Ramzi Abid (LW)	Canada	Phoenix Coyotes	Halifax Mooseheads (QMJHL)
86	Yanick Lehoux (C)	Canada	Los Angeles Kings	Baie-Comeau Drakkar (QMJHL)
87	Jan Boháč (C)	Czech Republic	Ottawa Senators	Slavia Praha (Czech Republic)
88	Kurt Sauer (D)	United States	Colorado Avalanche	Spokane Chiefs (WHL)
89	Libor Pivko (LW)	Czech Republic	Nashville Predators (from Florida)^{13}	Havirov Femax HC (Czech Republic)
90	Jean-Francois Racine (G)	Canada	Toronto Maple Leafs	Drummondville Voltigeurs (QMJHL)
91	Alexei Tereshchenko (C)	Russia	Dallas Stars	Dynamo Moscow (Russia)
92	Sergei Klyazmin (LW)	Russia	Colorado Avalanche (from Washington)^{14}	THK Tver (Russia)
93	Tim Branham (D)	United States	Vancouver Canucks (from New Jersey)^{15}	Barrie Colts (OHL)
94	Alexander Drozdetsky (RW)	Russia	Philadelphia Flyers	SKA St. Petersburg (Russia)
95	Dominic Moore (C)	Canada	New York Rangers (from Detroit)^{16}	Harvard University (ECAC)
96	Antoine Bergeron (LW)	Canada	St. Louis Blues	Val-d'Or Foreurs (QMJHL)

1. Boston acquired this pick as compensation after Boston could not sign their first-round pick on the 1998 entry draft, Ben Clymer.
2. Vancouver's acquired third-round pick went to New Jersey as the result of a trade on January 14, 2000, that sent Vadim Sharifijanov and a third-round pick in the 2000 Entry Draft to Vancouver in exchange for New Jersey's choice to get the second-round pick in the 2000 Entry Draft of Vancouver or the Islanders and New Jersey's choice to get the third-round pick in the 2000 Entry Draft of Atlanta or the Islanders (this pick).
  Vancouver previously acquired this pick as the result of a trade on June 25, 1999, that sent a first-round pick (# 1 overall) in the 2000 Entry Draft to Atlanta in exchange for a first-round pick (# 2 overall) and a conditional third-round pick in the 2000 Entry Draft (this pick).
3. Minnesota's third-round pick went to Dallas as the result of a trade on June 12, 2000, that sent Manny Fernandez and Brad Lukowich to Minnesota in exchange for a fourth-round pick in the 2002 entry draft and this pick.
4. Tampa Bay's third-round pick went to Toronto as the result of a trade on November 29, 1999, that sent Todd Warriner to Tampa Bay in exchange for this pick.
5. The Islander's third-round went to Vancouver as the result of a trade on December 19, 1999, that sent Bill Muckalt, Dave Scatchard and Kevin Weekes to the Islanders in exchange for Felix Potvin, a second-round pick and a conditional third-round pick (this pick) in the 2000 Entry Draft. Conditions of this draft pick are unknown.
6. San Jose's acquired third-round pick went to Chicago as the result of a trade on June 24, 2000, that sent a second-round pick (# 41 overall) in the 2000 Entry Draft to San Jose in exchange for a second-round pick (#49 overall) and this pick.
  Tampa Bay's acquired third-round pick went to San Jose as the result of a trade on August 4, 1999, that sent Shawn Burr, Steve Guolla, Bill Houlder and Andrei Zyuzin to Tampa Bay in exchange for Niklas Sundstrom and this pick.
  The Rangers' re-acquired pick went to Tampa Bay as the result of a trade on June 26, 1999, that sent a first-round pick in the 1999 entry draft to the Rangers in exchange for Dan Cloutier, Niklas Sundstrom, a first-round pick in the 2000 Entry Draft and this pick.
  The Rangers' third-round pick was re-acquired as the result of a trade on March 23, 1999, that sent Ulf Samuelsson to Detroit in exchange for a second-round pick in the 1999 entry draft and this pick.
  Detroit previously acquired this pick as the result of a trade on October 1, 1998, that sent Mike Knuble to the Rangers in exchange for this pick.
7. Calgary's third-round pick went to St. Louis as the result of a trade on September 4, 1999, that sent Grant Fuhr to Calgary in exchange for this pick.
8. Chicago's third-round pick went to New Jersey as the result of a trade on November 13, 1998, that sent Bryan Muir to Chicago in exchange for New Jersey's option of a third-round pick in the 1999 entry draft or in the 2000 Entry Draft (this pick).
9. Vancouver's third-round pick went to Florida as the result of a trade on January 17, 1999, that sent Mike Brown, Dave Gagner, Ed Jovanovski, Kevin Weekes and an option of a first-round pick in the 1999 entry draft or 2000 Entry Draft to Vancouver in exchange for Pavel Bure, Brad Ference, Bret Hedican and an option of a third-round pick in the 1999 entry draft or 2000 Entry Draft (this pick). The option was at Florida's discretion.
10. Anaheim's third-round pick went to Montreal as the result of a trade on June 24, 2000, that sent a second-round pick in the 2000 Entry Draft to Anaheim in exchange for fourth and fifth-round picks in the 2000 Entry Draft along with this pick.
11. Buffalo's third-round pick went to Tampa Bay as the result of a trade on March 9, 2000, that sent Chris Gratton and a second-round pick in the 2001 entry draft to Buffalo in exchange for Brian Holzinger, Wayne Primeau, Cory Sarich and this pick.
12. San Jose's third-round pick went to Florida as the result of a trade on December 30, 1999, that sent Radek Dvořák to San Jose in exchange for Mike Vernon and this pick.
13. Florida's third-round pick went to Nashville as the result of a trade on June 26, 1998, that sent a second-round pick (#40 overall) in the 1999 entry draft to Florida in exchange for a second-round pick (#45 overall) in the 1999 entry draft and this pick.
14. Washington's third-round pick went to Colorado as the result of a trade on March 23, 1999, that sent a second-round pick in the 1999 entry draft or in the 2000 Entry Draft to Washington in exchange for Dale Hunter and this pick. Conditions of this draft pick are unknown.
15. New Jersey's third-round pick went to Vancouver as the result of a trade on January 14, 2000, that sent New Jersey's choice to get the second-round pick in the 2000 Entry Draft of Vancouver or the Islanders and New Jersey's choice to get the third-round pick in the 2000 Entry Draft of Atlanta or the Islanders in exchange for Vadim Sharifijanov and this pick.
16. Detroit's second-round pick went to the Rangers as the result of a trade on June 24, 2000, that sent a second-round pick (# 38 overall) in the 2000 Entry Draft to Detroit in exchange for a second-round pick (# 64 overall) in the 2000 Entry Draft and this pick.

=== Round four ===
Pick	Player	Nationality	NHL team	College/junior/club team
97	Niclas Wallin (D)	Sweden	Carolina Hurricanes (from Atlanta)^{1}	Brynas IF (Sweden)
98	Jonas Ronnqvist (LW)	Sweden	Mighty Ducks of Anaheim (from Columbus via New York Islanders)^{2}	Lulea HF (Sweden)
99	Marc Cavosie (C/LW)	United States	Minnesota Wild	Rensselaer Polytechnic Institute (ECAC)
100	Miguel Delisle (RW)	Canada	Toronto Maple Leafs (from Tampa Bay)^{3}	Ottawa 67's (OHL)
101	Arto Tukio (D)	Finland	New York Islanders	Ilves (Finland)
102	Stefan Liv (G)	Sweden	Detroit Red Wings (from Nashville)^{4}	HV71 (Sweden)
103	Brett Nowak (C/LW)	United States	Boston Bruins	Harvard University (ECAC)
104	Jon DiSalvatore (RW)	United States	San Jose Sharks (from New York Rangers)^{5}	Providence College (Hockey East)
105	Vladimir Gorbunov	Russia	New York Islanders (from Calgary via Tampa Bay)^{6}	HC Moscow (Russia)
106	Scotty Balan (D)	Canada	Chicago Blackhawks	Regina Pats (WHL)
107	Carl Mallette (C)	Canada	Atlanta Thrashers (from Vancouver)^{7}	Victoriaville Tigres (QMJHL)
108	Blake Robson (C)	Canada	Atlanta Thrashers (from Anaheim via Carolina)^{8}	Portland Winterhawks (WHL)
109	Johan Eneqvist (LW)	Sweden	Montreal Canadiens	Leksands IF Jr. (Sweden)
110	Jared Newman (D)	United States	Carolina Hurricanes	Plymouth Whalers (OHL)
111	Ghyslain Rousseau (G)	Canada	Buffalo Sabres	Baie-Comeau Drakkar (QMJHL)
112	Premysl Duben (D)	Czech Republic	New York Rangers (from San Jose)^{9}	Dukla Jihlava (Czech Republic)
113	Lou Dickenson (C/LW)	Canada	Edmonton Oilers	Mississauga IceDogs (OHL)
114	Christian Larrivee (C)	Canada	Montreal Canadiens (from Pittsburgh)^{10}	Chicoutimi Sagueneens (QMJHL)
115	Chris Eade (D)	Canada	Florida Panthers (from Phoenix)^{11}	North Bay Centennials (OHL)
116	Levente Szuper (G)	Hungary	Calgary Flames (from Buffalo (compensatory) via Washington)^{12}	Ottawa 67's (OHL)
117	Olli Malmivaara (D)	Finland	Chicago Blackhawks (from Los Angeles)^{13}	Jokerit Jr. (Finland)
118	Lubomir Visnovsky (D)	Slovakia	Los Angeles Kings (from Ottawa)^{14}	Slovan Bratislava (Slovakia)
119	Brian Fahey (D)	United States	Colorado Avalanche	University of Wisconsin–Madison (WCHA)
120	Davis Parley (G)	Canada	Florida Panthers	Kamloops Blazers (WHL)
121	Ryan Van Buskirk (D)	Canada	Washington Capitals (from Toronto via Anaheim and Chicago)^{15}	Sarnia Sting (OHL)
122	Derrick Byfuglien (D)	United States	Ottawa Senators (compensatory)^{16}	Fargo-Moorhead Jets (USHL)
123	Vadim Khomitsky (D)	Russia	Dallas Stars	HC Moscow (Russia)
124	Michel Ouellet (RW)	Canada	Pittsburgh Penguins (from Washington via Anaheim and Montreal)^{17}	Rimouski Oceanic (QMJHL)
125	Phil Cole (D)	Canada	New Jersey Devils	Lethbridge Hurricanes (WHL)
126	Johan Hagglund (C)	Sweden	Tampa Bay Lightning (from Philadelphia)^{18}	MODO Jr. (Sweden)
127	Dmitri Semyonov	Russia	Detroit Red Wings	Dynamo Moscow (Russia)
128	Alexander Seluyanov (D)	Russia	Detroit Red Wings (compensatory)^{19}	Salavat Yulayev Ufa (Russia)
129	Troy Riddle (C/RW)	United States	St. Louis Blues	Des Moines Buccaneers (USHL)
130	Aaron Van Leusen (C/RW)	Canada	Detroit Red Wings (compensatory)^{20}	Brampton Battalion (OHL)

1. Atlanta's fourth-round pick went to Carolina as the result of a trade on June 24, 2000, that sent fourth (# 108 overall), fifth and eighth-round picks in the 2000 Entry Draft to Atlanta in exchange for this pick.
2. The Islanders' acquired fourth-round pick went Anaheim as the result of a trade on May 23, 2000, that sent Trent Hunter to the Islanders in exchange for this pick.
  The Islanders previously acquired this pick as the result of a trade on May 11, 2000, that sent Chris Nielsen to Columbus in exchange for a ninth-round pick in the 2000 Entry Draft and this pick.
3. Tampa Bay's fourth-round pick went to Toronto as the result of a trade on February 9, 2000, that sent Mike Johnson, Marek Posmyk, a fifth-round and sixth-round picks in the 2000 Entry Draft to Tampa Bay in exchange for Darcy Tucker and this pick. Also, Toronto had an option to swap fifth-round picks in the 2001 entry draft with Tampa Bay.
4. Nashville's fourth-round pick went to Detroit as the result of a trade on June 24, 2000, that sent a third-round pick in the 2001 entry draft to Nashville in exchange for this pick.
5. The Rangers' fourth-round pick went to San Jose as the result of a trade on June 25, 2000, that sent fourth (# 112 overall) and fifth-round picks in the 2000 Entry Draft to the Rangers in exchange for this pick.
6. Tampa Bay's acquired fourth-round pick went to the Islanders as the result of a trade on June 24, 2000, that sent Kevin Weekes, the rights to Kristian Kudroc and a second-round pick in the 2001 entry draft to Tampa Bay in exchange for a first and seven-round picks in the 2000 Entry Draft along with this pick.
  Tampa Bay previously acquired this pick as the result of a trade on November 13, 1999, that sent Andreas Johansson to Calgary in exchange for the rights to Nils Ekman and this pick.
7. Vancouver's fourth-round pick went to Atlanta as the result of a trade on October 29, 1999, that sent Corey Schwab to Vancouver in exchange for a conditional pick in the 2000 Entry Draft (this pick). Conditions of this draft pick are unknown.
8. Carolina's acquired fourth-round pick went to Atlanta as the result of a trade on June 24, 2000, that sent a fourth-round pick in the 2000 Entry Draft to Carolina in exchange for fifth and eighth-round picks along with this pick.
  Carolina previously acquired this pick as the result of a trade on August 11, 1998, that sent Stu Grimson and Kevin Haller to Anaheim in exchange for Dave Karpa and this pick.
9. San Jose's fourth-round pick went to the Rangers as the result of a trade on June 25, 2000, that sent a fourth-round pick (# 104 overall) in the 2000 Entry Draft to San Jose in exchange for a fifth-round pick in the 2000 Entry Draftthis pick.
10. Pittsburgh's fourth-round pick went to Montreal as the result of a trade on June 24, 2000, that sent fourth (# 124 overall) and fifth-round picks in the 2000 Entry Draft to Pittsburgh in exchange for this pick.
11. Phoenix's fourth-round pick went to Florida as the result of a trade on November 18, 1999, that sent Sean Burke and a fifth-round pick in the 2000 Entry Draft to Phoenix in exchange for Mikhail Shtalenkov and this pick.
12. Washington's acquired fourth-round pick went to Calgary as the result of a trade on June 24, 2000, that sent a second-round pick in the 2000 Entry Draft to Washington in exchange for Miika Elomo and this pick.
  Washington previously acquired this pick to complete a trade on March 23, 1999, that sent Joe Juneau and a third-round pick in the 2000 Entry Draft to Buffalo in exchange for Alexei Tezikov and future considerations (this pick).
  Buffalo acquired this pick as the result of a compensation for Ottawa signing Joe Juneau as a free agent on October 25, 1999.
13. Los Angeles' fourth-round pick went to Chicago as the result of a trade on May 1, 2000, that sent Steve Passmore to Los Angeles in exchange for Chicago's option of a fourth-round pick in the 2000 Entry Draft or in the 2001 entry draft. Chicago chose this pick.
14. Ottawa's fourth-round pick went to Los Angeles as the result of a trade on June 25, 2000, that sent two fifth-round picks (# 156 and 157 overall) in the 2000 Entry Draft to Ottawa in exchange for this pick.
15. Chicago's acquired fourth-round pick went to Washington as the result of a trade on June 25, 2000, that sent fifth and sixth-round picks in the 2000 Entry Draft to Chicago in exchange for this pick.
  Chicago previously acquired this pick as the result of a trade on October 27, 1998, that sent Marty McInnis to Anaheim in exchange for this pick.
  Anaheim previously acquired this pick on October 1, 1998, from Toronto as payment of tampering charges for signing a Mighty Ducks scout.
16. Ottawa acquired this pick as the result of a compensation for Florida signing Lance Pitlick as a free agent on July 21, 1999.
17. Montreal's acquired fourth-round pick went to Pittsburgh as the result of a trade on June 24, 2000, that sent a fourth-round pick in the 2000 Entry Draft (# 114 overall) to Montreal in exchange for a fifth-round pick in the 2000 Entry Draft and this pick.
  Montreal previously acquired this pick as the result of a trade on June 24, 2000, that sent a second-round pick in the 2000 Entry Draft to Anaheim in exchange for a third-round and fifth-round picks in the 2000 Entry Draft along with this pick.
  Anaheim previously acquired this pick as the result of a trade on June 1, 2000, that sent the rights to Stephen Peat to Washington in exchange for this pick.
18. Philadelphia's fourth-round pick went to Tampa Bay as the result of a trade on June 25, 2000, that sent sixth, seventh and ninth-round picks in the 2000 Entry Draft to Philadelphia in exchange for this pick.
19. Detroit acquired this pick as the result of a compensation for Chicago signing Wendel Clark as a free agent on August 2, 1999.
20. Detroit acquired this pick as the result of a compensation for Phoenix signing Todd Gill as a free agent on July 21, 1999.

=== Round five ===
Pick	Player	Nationality	NHL team	College/junior/club team
131	Matt Hendricks (C)	United States	Nashville Predators (from Atlanta)^{1}	Blaine High School (USHS-MN)
132	Maxim Sushinsky	Russia	Minnesota Wild	Avangard Omsk (Russia)
133	Petteri Nummelin (D)	Finland	Columbus Blue Jackets	HC Davos (Switzerland)
134	Peter Podhradsky (D)	Slovakia	Mighty Ducks of Anaheim (from Tampa Bay)^{2}	Slovan Bratislava (Slovakia)
135	Mike Jefferson (C)	Canada	New Jersey Devils (compensatory)^{3}	Barrie Colts (OHL)
136	Dmitri Upper (C)	Kazakhstan	New York Islanders	Nizhny Novgorod (Russia)
137	Mike Stuart (D)	United States	Nashville Predators	Colorado College (WCHA)
138	Scott Heffernan (D)	Canada	Columbus Blue Jackets (from Boston)^{4}	Sarnia Sting (OHL)
139	Ruslan Bernikov (RW)	Russia	Dallas Stars (compensatory)^{5}	Amur Khabarovsk (Russia)
140	Nathan Martz (C)	Canada	New York Rangers	Chilliwack Chiefs (BCJHL)
141	Wade Davis (D)	Canada	Calgary Flames	Calgary Hitmen (WHL)
142	Michal Pinc (C/LW)	Canada	San Jose Sharks (from Chicago)^{6}	Rouyn-Noranda Huskies (QMJHL)
143	Brandon Snee (G)	United States	New York Rangers (from San Jose; compensatory)^{7}	Union College (ECAC)
144	Pavel Duma (C)	Russia	Vancouver Canucks	Neftekhimik Nizhnekamsk (Russia)
145	Ryan Glenn (D)	Canada	Montreal Canadiens (from Anaheim)^{8}	Walpole Jr. Stars (EJHL)
146	David Koci (D)	Czech Republic	Pittsburgh Penguins (from Montreal)^{9}	Sparta Praha Jr (Czech Republic)
147	Matt McRae (C)	United States	Atlanta Thrashers (from Carolina; compensatory)^{10}	Cornell University (ECAC)
148	Kristofer Ottosson (C)	Sweden	New York Islanders (from Carolina via Philadelphia)^{11}	Djurgardens IF (Sweden)
149	Denis Denisov (LW)	Russia	Buffalo Sabres	CSKA Moscow Jr. (Russia)
150	Tyler Kolarik (C)	United States	Columbus Blue Jackets (from San Jose via Buffalo)^{12}	Deerfield Academy (USHS-MA)
151	Alexander Barkunov (D)	Russia	Chicago Blackhawks (from Los Angeles (compensatory) via Washington)^{13}	Lokomotiv Yaroslavl (Russia)
152	Paul Flache (D)	Canada	Edmonton Oilers	Brampton Battalion (OHL)
153	Bill Cass (D)	United States	Mighty Ducks of Anaheim (from Pittsburgh)^{14}	Boston College (ECAC)
154	Matt Koalska (C)	United States	Nashville Predators (from Phoenix via Edmonton)^{15}	St. Paul Vulcans (USHL)
155	Travis Moen (LW)	Canada	Calgary Flames (compensatory)^{16}	Kelowna Rockets (WHL)
156	Greg Zanon (D)	Canada	Ottawa Senators (from Los Angeles)^{17}	University of Nebraska Omaha (CCHA)
157	Grant Potulny (C/LW)	United States	Ottawa Senators (from Los Angeles; compensatory)^{18}	Lincoln Stars (USHL)
158	Sean Connolly (D)	United States	Ottawa Senators	Northern Michigan University (CCHA)
159	John-Michael Liles (D)	United States	Colorado Avalanche	Michigan State University (CCHA)
160	Nate Kiser (D)	Canada	Phoenix Coyotes (from Florida)^{19}	Plymouth Whalers (OHL)
161	Pavel Sedov	Russia	Tampa Bay Lightning (from Toronto)^{20}	Khimik Voskresensk (Russia)
162	Artyom Chernov (C)	Russia	Dallas Stars	Metallurg Novokuznetsk (Russia)
163	Ivan Nepryaev	Russia	Washington Capitals	Lokomotiv Yaroslavl (Russia)
164	Matus Kostur (G)	Slovakia	New Jersey Devils	HC '05 Banská Bystrica (Slovakia)
165	Nathan Marsters (G)	Canada	Los Angeles Kings (from Philadelphia)^{21}	Chilliwack Chiefs (BCJHL)
166	Nolan Schaefer (G)	Canada	San Jose Sharks (from Detroit)^{22}	Providence College (Hockey East)
167	Craig Weller (D)	Canada	St. Louis Blues	Calgary Canucks (AJHL)

1. Atlanta's fifth-round pick went to Nashville as the result of a trade on June 21, 1999, that sent Andrew Brunette to Atlanta in exchange for a conditional pick in the 2000 Entry Draft (this pick). Conditions of this draft pick are unknown.
2. Tampa Bay's fifth-round pick went to Anaheim as the result of a trade on December 10, 1998, that sent Drew Bannister to Tampa Bay in exchange for this pick.
3. New Jersey acquired this pick as the result of a compensation for Boston signing Dave Andreychuk as a free agent on July 29, 1999.
4. Boston's fifth-round pick went to Columbus as the result of a trade on June 23, 2000, that sent future considerations to Boston in exchange for this pick.
5. Dallas acquired this pick as the result of a compensation for Detroit signing Pat Verbeek as a free agent on November 11, 1999.
6. Chicago's fifth-round pick went to San Jose as the result of a trade on August 23, 1999, that sent Michel Larocque to Chicago in exchange for this pick.
7. San Jose's acquired fifth-round pick went to the Rangers as the result of a trade on June 25, 2000, that sent a fourth-round pick (# 104 overall) in the 2000 Entry Draft to San Jose in exchange for a fourth-round pick (#112 overall) in the 2000 Entry Draftthis pick.
  San Jose acquired this pick as the result of a compensation for Boston signing Joe Murphy as a free agent on November 12, 1999.
8. Anaheim's fifth-round pick went to Montreal as the result of a trade on June 24, 2000, that sent a second-round pick in the 2000 Entry Draft to Anaheim in exchange for third and fourth-round picks in the 2000 Entry Draft along with this pick.
9. Montreal's fifth-round pick went to Pittsburgh as the result of a trade on June 24, 2000, that sent a fourth-round pick (# 114 overall) in the 2000 Entry Draft to Montreal in exchange for a fourth-round pick (# 124 overall) in the 2000 Entry Draft and this pick.
10. Carolina's acquired fifth-round pick went to Atlanta as the result of a trade on June 24, 2000, that sent a second-round pick in the 2000 Entry Draft to Carolina in exchange for fourth and eighth-round picks in the 2000 Entry Draft along with this pick.
  Carolina acquired this pick as the result of a compensation for Florida signing Ray Sheppard as a free agent on November 15, 1999.
11. Philadelphia's acquired fifth-round pick went to the Islanders as the result of a trade on February 15, 2000, that Gino Odjick to Philadelphia in exchange for Mikael Andersson and this pick.
  Philadelphia previously acquired this pick as the result of a trade on January 23, 2000, that sent Rod Brind'Amour, Jean-Marc Pelletier and a Second-round pick in the 2000 Entry Draft to Carolina in exchange for Keith Primeau and this pick.
12. Buffalo's acquired fifth-round pick went to Columbus as the result of a trade on June 23, 2000, that sent future considerations (Columbus agreed to select Geoff Sanderson and Dwayne Roloson in the 2000 NHL expansion draft) to Buffalo in exchange for Matt Davidson, Jean-Luc Grand-Pierre. a fifth-round pick in the 2001 entry draft and this pick.
  Buffalo previously acquired this pick as the result of a trade on June 18, 1998, that sent Steve Shields and a fourth-round pick in the 1998 entry draft to San Jose in exchange for Kay Whitmore, a second-round pick in the 1998 entry draft and this pick.
13. Washington's acquired fifth-round pick went to Chicago as the result of a trade on June 25, 2000, that sent a fourth-round pick in the 2000 Entry Draft to Washington in exchange for a sixth-round pick in the 2000 Entry Draft and this pick.
  Los Angeles's acquired fifth-round pick went to Washington as the result of a trade on June 25, 2000, that sent two seventh-round pick (# 201 and 206 overall) in the 2000 Entry Draft to Los Angeles in exchange for this pick.
  Los Angeles acquired this pick as the result of a compensation for Atlanta signing Ray Ferraro as a free agent on August 9, 1999.
14. Pittsburgh's fifth-round pick went to Anaheim as the result of a trade on March 14, 2000, that sent Dan Trebil to Pittsburgh in exchange for this pick.
15. Edmonton's acquired fifth-round pick went to Nashville as the result of a trade on June 12, 2000, that sent Patrick Cote to Edmonton in exchange for this pick.
  Edmonton previously acquired this pick as the result of a trade on March 11, 1999, that sent Mikhail Shtalenkov in exchange for this pick.
16. Calgary acquired this pick as the result of a compensation for Detroit signing Ken Wregget as a free agent on July 23, 1999.
17. Los Angeles' fifth-round pick went to Ottawa as the result of a trade on June 25, 2000, that sent a fourth-round pick in the 2000 Entry Draft to Los Angeles in exchange for a fifth-round pick (# 157 overall) in the 2000 Entry Draft and this pick.
18. Los Angeles' acquired fifth-round pick went to Ottawa as the result of a trade on June 25, 2000, that sent a fourth-round pick in the 2000 Entry Draft to Los Angeles in exchange for a fifth-round pick (# 156 overall) in the 2000 Entry Draft and this pick
  Los Angeles acquired this pick as the result of a compensation for Vancouver signing Doug Bodger as a free agent on August 18, 1999.
19. Florida's fifth-round pick went to Phoenix as the result of a trade on November 18, 1999, that sent Mikhail Shtalenkov and a fourth-round pick in the 2000 Entry Draft to Florida in exchange for Sean Burke and this pick.
20. Toronto's fifth-round pick went to Tampa Bay as the result of a trade on February 9, 2000, that sent Darcy Tucker and a fourth-round in the 2000 Entry Draft to Toronto in exchange for Mike Johnson, Marek Posmyk, a sixth-round pick in the 2000 Entry Draft and this pick. Also, Toronto had an option to swap fifth-round picks in the 2001 entry draft with Tampa Bay.
21. Philadelphia's fifth-round pick went to Los Angeles as the result of a trade on March 23, 1999, that sent Steve Duchesne to Philadelphia in exchange for Dave Babych and this pick.
22. Detroit's fifth-round pick went to San Jose as the result of a trade on June 26, 1999, that sent a fifth-round pick in the 1999 entry draft to Detroit in exchange for this pick.

=== Round six ===
Pick	Player	Nationality	NHL team	College/junior/club team
168	Zdenek Smid (G)	Czech Republic	Atlanta Thrashers	Karlovy Vary (Czech Republic)
169	Shane Bendera (G)	United States	Columbus Blue Jackets	Red Deer Rebels (WHL)
170	Erik Reitz (D)	United States	Minnesota Wild	Barrie Colts (OHL)
171	Roman Cechmanek (G)	Czech Republic	Philadelphia Flyers (from Tampa Bay)^{1}	HC Vsetin (Czech Republic)
172	Scott Selig (C/RW)	United States	Montreal Canadiens (from New York Islanders via Philadelphia)^{2}	Thayer Academy (USHS-MA)
173	Tomas Harant (D)	Slovakia	Nashville Predators	MsHK Zilina (Slovakia)
174	Jarno Kultanen (D)	Finland	Boston Bruins	HIFK (Finland)
175	Sven Helfenstein (C/RW)	Switzerland	New York Rangers	Kloten Flyers (Switzerland)
176	Jukka Hentunen	Finland	Calgary Flames	HPK (Finland)
177	Mike Ayers (G)	United States	Chicago Blackhawks	Dubuque Fighting Saints (USHL)
178	Jeff Dwyer (D)	United States	Atlanta Thrashers (from Vancouver via Philadelphia)^{3}	Choate Rosemary Hall (USHS-CT)
179	Vadim Sozinov (C)	Kazakhstan	Toronto Maple Leafs (from Anaheim)^{4}	Metallurg Novokuznetsk (Russia)
180	Darcy Hordichuk (LW)	Canada	Atlanta Thrashers (from Montreal)^{5}	Saskatoon Blades (WHL)
181	J. D. Forrest (D)	United States	Carolina Hurricanes	USA Hockey National Team Development Program (NAHL)
182	Petr Chvojka (D)	Czech Republic	Montreal Canadiens (from Buffalo)^{6}	HC Plzen Jr. (Czech Republic)
183	Michal Macho (C)	Slovakia	San Jose Sharks	HC Martin (Slovakia)
184	Shaun Norrie (RW)	Canada	Edmonton Oilers	Calgary Hitmen (WHL)
185	Patrick Foley (LW)	United States	Pittsburgh Penguins	University of New Hampshire (Hockey East)
186	Brent Gauvreau (C)	Canada	Phoenix Coyotes	Oshawa Generals (OHL)
187	Par Backer (C)	Sweden	Detroit Red Wings (from Los Angeles)^{7}	Grums IK (Sweden)
188	Jason Maleyko (D)	Canada	Ottawa Senators	Brampton Battalion (OHL)
189	Chris Bahen (D)	United States	Colorado Avalanche	Clarkson University (ECAC)
190	Josh Olson (LW)	United States	Florida Panthers	Omaha Lancers (USHL)
191	Aaron Gionet (D)	Canada	Tampa Bay Lightning (from Toronto)^{8}	Kamloops Blazers (WHL)
192	Ladislav Vlcek (RW)	Czech Republic	Dallas Stars	Rabat Kladno Jr. (Czech Republic)
193	Joey Martin (D)	United States	Chicago Blackhawks (from Washington)^{9}	Omaha Lancers (USHL)
194	Deryk Engelland (D)	Canada	New Jersey Devils	Moose Jaw Warriors (WHL)
195	Colin Shields (RW)	United Kingdom	Philadelphia Flyers	Cleveland Jr. Barons (NAHL)
196	Paul Ballantyne (D)	Canada	Detroit Red Wings	Sault Ste. Marie Greyhounds (OHL)
197	Zbynek Irgl (LW)	Czech Republic	Nashville Predators (from St. Louis)^{10}	HC Vitkovice (Czech Republic)

1. Tampa Bay's sixth-round pick went to Philadelphia as the result of a trade on June 25, 2000, that sent a fourth-round pick in the 2000 Entry Draft to Tampa Bay in exchange for seventh and ninth-round picks in the 2000 Entry Draft along with this pick.
2. Philadelphia's acquired sixth-round pick went to Montreal as the result of a trade on March 10, 1999, that sent Mark Recchi to Philadelphia in exchange for Dainius Zubrus, Montreal's option of a second-round pick from Philadelphia in the 1999 entry draft or 2000 Entry Draft or a second-round pick from the Islanders in the 2000 Entry Draft and this pick.
  Philadelphia previously acquired this pick as the result of a trade on August 25, 1998, that sent the rights to Raymond Giroux to the Islanders in exchange for this pick.
3. Philadelphia's acquired sixth-round pick went to Atlanta as the result of a trade on March 14, 2000, that sent Kirby Law to Philadelphia in exchange for a sixth-round pick in the 2001 entry draft and this pick.
  Philadelphia previously acquired this pick as the result of a trade on October 19, 1998, that sent Trent Klatt to Vancouver in exchange for this pick.
4. Anaheim's sixth-round pick went to Toronto as the result of a trade on June 25, 2000, that sent the rights to Jonathan Hedstrom to Anaheim in exchange for seventh-round pick in the 2000 Entry Draft and this pick.
5. Montreal's sixth-round pick went to Atlanta on June 2, 2000, to complete an agreement that Atlanta selects Brett Clark in the 1999 NHL expansion draft in exchange for this pick.
6. Buffalo's sixth-round pick went to Montreal as the result of a trade on June 25, 2000, that sent a fifth-round pick in the 2001 entry draft to Buffalo in exchange for this pick.
7. Los Angeles' sixth-round pick went to Detroit as the result of a trade on October 22, 1998, that sent Ryan Bach to Los Angeles in exchange for a conditional pick in the 2000 Entry Draft (this pick). Conditions of this draft pick are unknown.
8. Toronto's sixth-round pick went to Tampa Bay as the result of a trade on February 9, 2000, that sent Darcy Tucker and a fourth-round in the 2000 Entry Draft to Toronto in exchange for Mike Johnson, Marek Posmyk, a fifth-round pick in the 2000 Entry Draft and this pick. Also, Toronto had an option to swap fifth-round picks in the 2001 entry draft with Tampa Bay.
9. Washington's sixth-round pick went to Chicago as the result of a trade on June 25, 2000, that sent a fourth-round pick in the 2000 Entry Draft to Washington in exchange for a fifth-round pick in the 2000 Entry Draft and this pick.
10. St. Louis' sixth-round pick went to Nashville as the result of a trade on March 23, 1999, that sent Blair Atcheynum to St. Louis in exchange for this pick.

=== Round seven ===
Pick	Player	Nationality	NHL team	College/junior/club team
198	Ken Magowan (LW)	Canada	New Jersey Devils (from Atlanta)^{1}	Vernon Vipers (BCJHL)
199	Brian Passmore (C)	Canada	Minnesota Wild	Ottawa 67's (OHL)
200	Janne Jokila (LW)	Finland	Columbus Blue Jackets	TPS Jr. (Finland)
201	Yevgeni Fyodorov (C)	Russia	Los Angeles Kings (from Tampa Bay via Washington)^{2}	Molot Perm (Russia)
202	Ryan Caldwell (D)	Canada	New York Islanders (from New York Islanders via Tampa Bay)^{3}	Thunder Bay Flyers (TBJHL)
203	Jure Penko (G)	Slovenia	Nashville Predators	Green Bay Gamblers (USHL)
204	Chris Berti (C/LW)	Canada	Boston Bruins	Sarnia Sting (OHL)
205	Henrik Lundqvist (G)	Sweden	New York Rangers	Frolunda HC (Sweden)
206	Tim Eriksson (C)	Sweden	Los Angeles Kings (from Calgary via Washington)^{4}	Frolunda HC (Sweden)
207	Cliff Loya (D)	United States	Chicago Blackhawks	University of Maine (NCAA)
208	Brandon Reid (C)	Canada	Vancouver Canucks	Halifax Mooseheads (QMJHL)
209	Markus Seikola (D)	Finland	Toronto Maple Leafs (from Anaheim)^{5}	TPS Jr. (Finland)
210	John Eichelberger (C)	United States	Philadelphia Flyers (from Montreal via Tampa Bay)^{6}	Green Bay Gamblers (USHL)
211	Joe Cullen (C/LW)	United States	Edmonton Oilers (compensatory)^{7}	Colorado College (NCAA)
212	Magnus Kahnberg (LW)	Sweden	Carolina Hurricanes	Frolunda HC (Sweden)
213	Vasili Bizyayev (RW)	Russia	Buffalo Sabres	CSKA Moscow Jr. (Russia)
214	Peter Bartos (LW)	Slovakia	Minnesota Wild (from San Jose)^{8}	HC Ceske Budejovice (Czech Republic)
215	Matthew Lombardi (C)	Canada	Edmonton Oilers	Victoriaville Tigres (QMJHL)
216	Jim Abbott (LW)	United States	Pittsburgh Penguins	University of New Hampshire (NCAA)
217	Igor Samoilov (D)	Russia	Phoenix Coyotes	Lokomotiv Yaroslavl (Russia)
218	Craig Olynick (D)	Canada	Los Angeles Kings	Seattle Thunderbirds (WHL)
219	Marco Tuokko (C)	Finland	Dallas Stars (compensatory)^{9}	TPS Jrs. (Finland)
220	Paul Gaustad (C/LW)	United States	Buffalo Sabres (from Ottawa via Tampa Bay)^{10}	Portland Winterhawks (WHL)
221	Aaron Molnar (G)	Canada	Colorado Avalanche	London Knights (OHL)
222	Marek Priechodsky (D)	Slovakia	Tampa Bay Lightning (from Florida)^{11}	Slovan Bratislava (Slovakia)
223	Lubos Velebny (D)	Slovakia	Toronto Maple Leafs	HKm Zvolen Jr. (Slovakia)
224	Antti Miettinen (C)	Finland	Dallas Stars	HPK (Finland)
225	Vladislav Luchkin (C)	Russia	Chicago Blackhawks (from Washington)^{12}	Severstal Cherepovets (Russia)
226	Brian Eklund (G)	United States	Tampa Bay Lightning (from New Jersey)^{13}	Brown University (NCAA)
227	Guillaume Lefebvre (C)	Canada	Philadelphia Flyers	Rouyn-Noranda Huskies (QMJHL)
228	Jimmie Svensson (C)	Sweden	Detroit Red Wings	VIK Vasteras HK Jr. (Sweden)
229	Brett Lutes (LW)	Canada	St. Louis Blues	Montreal Rocket (QMJHL)

1. Atlanta's seventh-round pick went to New Jersey as the result of a trade on November 1, 1999, that sent Éric Bertrand and Wes Mason to Atlanta in exchange for Sylvain Cloutier, Jeff Williams and this pick.
2. Washington's acquired seventh-round pick went to Los Angeles as the result of a trade on June 25, 2000, that sent a fifth-round pick in the 2000 Entry Draft to Washington in exchange for a seventh-round pick (# 206 overall) in the 2000 Entry Draft and this pick.
  Washington previously acquired this pick as the result of a trade on January 17, 2000, that sent the Jaroslav Svejkovsky to Tampa Bay in exchange for a third-round pick in the 2001 entry draft and this pick.
3. The Islanders' re-acquired this pick as the result of a trade on June 24, 2000, that sent Kevin Weekes, the rights to Kristian Kudroc and a second-round pick in the 2001 entry draft to Tampa Bay in exchange for a first and fourth-round picks in the 2000 Entry Draft along with this pick.
  Tampa Bay previously acquired this pick as the result of a trade on March 9, 2000, that sent the Ian Herbers to the Islanders in exchange for this pick.
4. Washington's acquired seventh-round pick went to Los Angeles as the result of a trade on June 25, 2000, that sent a fifth-round pick in the 2000 Entry Draft to Washington in exchange for a seventh-round pick (# 201 overall) in the 2000 Entry Draft and this pick.
  Washington previously acquired this pick as the result of a trade on March 22, 1999, that sent the Tom Chorske to Calgary in exchange for a ninth-round pick in the 2000 Entry Draft and this pick.
5. Anaheim's seventh-round pick went to Toronto as the result of a trade on June 25, 2000, that sent the rights to Jonathan Hedstrom to Anaheim in exchange for sixth-round pick in the 2000 Entry Draft and this pick.
6. Tampa Bay's acquired seventh-round pick went to Philadelphia as the result of a trade on June 25, 2000, that sent a fourth-round pick in the 2000 Entry Draft to Tampa Bay in exchange for a sixth-round and ninth-round picks in the 2000 Entry Draft along with this pick.
  Tampa Bay previously acquired this pick as the result of a trade on June 2, 2000, that sent the Kevin Hodson to Montreal in exchange for this pick.
7. Edmonton acquired this pick as the result of a compensation for Boston signing Marty McSorley as a free agent on December 9, 1999.
8. Minnesota previously acquired this pick as the result of a trade on June 11, 2000, that sent an eight-round pick in the 2001 entry draft and future considerations (protection of Evgeni Nabokov in 2000 NHL expansion draft) to San Jose in exchange for Andy Sutton, a third-round pick in the 2001 entry draft and this pick.
9. Dallas acquired this pick as the result of a compensation for the Islanders signing Tony Hrkac as a free agent on July 29, 1999.
10. Tampa Bay's acquired seventh-round pick went to Buffalo as the result of a trade on June 25, 2000, that sent a seventh-round and ninth-round picks in the 2001 entry draft to Tampa Bay in exchange for this pick.
  Tampa Bay previously acquired this pick as the result of a trade on June 4, 2000, that sent the Rich Parent to Ottawa in exchange for this pick.
11. Florida's seventh-round pick went to Tampa Bay as the result of a trade on June 1, 2000, that sent the rights to Eric Beaudoin to Florida in exchange for this pick.
12. Washington's ninth-round pick went to Chicago as the result of a trade on June 26, 1999, that sent a ninth-round pick in the 1999 entry draft to Washington in exchange for this pick.
13. New Jersey's seventh-round pick went to Tampa Bay as the result of a trade on October 7, 1999, that sent Steve Kelly to New Jersey in exchange for this pick.

=== Round eight ===
Pick	Player	Nationality	NHL team	College/junior/club team
230	Samu Isosalo (RW)	Finland	Atlanta Thrashers	North Bay Centennials (OHL)
231	Pete Zingoni (C)	United States	Columbus Blue Jackets	New England Jr. Huskies (EJHL)
232	Lubomir Sekeras (D)	Slovakia	Minnesota Wild	Ocelari Trinec (Czech Republic)
233	Alexander Polukeyev (G)	Russia	Tampa Bay Lightning	SKA St. Petersburg (Russia)
234	Janis Sprukts (C)	Latvia	Florida Panthers (from New York Islanders)^{1}	Lukko Jr. (Finland)
235	Craig Kowalski (G)	United States	Carolina Hurricanes (compensatory)^{2}	Detroit Compuware Ambassadors (NAHL)
236	Mats Christeen (D)	Sweden	Nashville Predators	Sodertalje SK Jr. (Sweden)
237	Zdenek Kutlak (D)	Czech Republic	Boston Bruins	HC Ceske Budejovice (Czech Republic)
238	Dan Eberly (D)	United States	New York Rangers	Rensselaer Polytechnic Institute (ECAC)
239	David Hajek (D)	Czech Republic	Calgary Flames	Pirati Chomutov (Czech Republic)
240	Adam Berkhoel (G)	United States	Chicago Blackhawks	St. Paul Vulcans (USHL)
241	Nathan Barrett (C)	Canada	Vancouver Canucks	Lethbridge Hurricanes (WHL)
242	Evan Nielsen (D)	United States	Atlanta Thrashers (from Anaheim)^{3}	University of Notre Dame (CCHA)
243	Joni Puurula (G)	Finland	Montreal Canadiens	Hermes Mestis (Finland)
244	Eric Bowen (RW)	United States	Atlanta Thrashers (from Carolina)^{4}	Portland Winterhawks (WHL)
245	Dan Welch (RW)	United States	Los Angeles Kings (from Buffalo)^{5}	University of Minnesota (WCHA)
246	Chad Wiseman (LW)	Canada	San Jose Sharks	Mississauga IceDogs (OHL)
247	Jason Platt (D)	United States	Edmonton Oilers	Omaha Lancers(USHL)
248	Steven Crampton (RW)	Canada	Pittsburgh Penguins	Moose Jaw Warriors (WHL)
249	Sami Venalainen (RW)	Finland	Phoenix Coyotes	Tappara Jr. (Finland)
250	Flavien Conne (C)	Switzerland	Los Angeles Kings	HC Fribourg-Gotteron (Switzerland)
251	Todd Jackson (RW)	United States	Detroit Red Wings (from Ottawa)^{6}	US NTDP (NAHL)
252	Darryl Bootland (RW)	Canada	Colorado Avalanche	Toronto St. Michael's Majors (OHL)
253	Matthew Sommerfeld (LW)	Canada	Florida Panthers	Swift Current Broncos (WHL)
254	Alexander Shinkar (RW)	Russia	Toronto Maple Leafs	Severstal Cherepovets (Russia)
255	Eric Johansson (C)	Canada	Minnesota Wild (from Dallas)^{7}	Tri-Cities Americans (WHL)
256	Pasi Saarinen (D)	Finland	San Jose Sharks (from Washington)^{8}	Ilves (Finland)
257	Warren McCutcheon (C)	Canada	New Jersey Devils	Lethbridge Hurricanes (WHL)
258	Sean McMorrow (D)	Canada	Buffalo Sabres (from Calgary; compensatory)^{9}	Kitchener Rangers(OHL)
259	Regan Kelly (D)	Canada	Philadelphia Flyers	Nipawin Hawks (SJHL)
260	Evgeni Bumagin (RW)	Kazakhstan	Detroit Red Wings	HK Moscow (Russia)
261	Reinhard Divis (G)	Austria	St. Louis Blues	Leksands IF (Sweden)

1. The Islanders' eighth-round pick went to Florida as the result of a trade on June 26, 1999, that sent a ninth-round pick in the 1999 entry draft to the Islanders in exchange for this pick.
2. Carolina acquired this pick as the result of a compensation for Ottawa signing Kevin Dineen as a free agent on September 1, 1999.
3. Anaheim's eighth-round pick went to Atlanta as the result of a trade on September 27, 1999, that sent Ladislav Kohn to Anaheim in exchange for this pick.
4. Carolina's eighth-round pick went to Atlanta as the result of a trade on June 24, 2000, that sent a second-round pick in the 2000 Entry Draft to Carolina in exchange for fourth and fifth-round picks in the 2000 Entry Draft along with this pick.
5. Buffalo's eighth-round pick went to Los Angeles as the result of a trade on January 22, 2000, that sent Vladimir Tsyplakov and a conditional eighth-round pick in the 2001 entry draft to Buffalo in exchange for a conditional sixth-round or a conditional pick in the 2001 entry draft and this pick. Condition of these draft picks was if Vladimir Tsyplakov re-signed with Buffalo after the 2000 Entry Draft, Los Angeles and Buffalo receives the extra picks. If he did not re-sign, Los Angeles would get a conditional compensatory pick if one is awarded to Buffalo.
6. Ottawa's eighth-round pick went to Detroit as the result of a trade on June 25, 2000, that sent Shane Hnidy to Ottawa in exchange for this pick.
7. Dallas' eighth-round pick went to Minnesota as the result of a trade on June 25, 2000, that sent Brad Lukowich, third and ninth-round picks 2001 entry draft to Dallas in exchange for Aaron Gavey, Pavel Patera, a fourth-round pick in the 2002 entry draft and this pick.
8. Washington's eighth-round pick went to San Jose as the result of a trade on June 25, 2000, that sent an eighth-round pick 2001 entry draft to Washington in exchange for this pick.
9. Calgary's acquired eighth-round pick went to Buffalo as the result of a trade on June 25, 2000, that sent an eighth-round pick in the 2001 entry draft to Calgary in exchange for this pick
  Calgary acquired this pick as the result of a compensation for Pittsburgh signing Tom Chorske as a free agent on September 2, 1999.

=== Round nine ===
Pick	Player	Nationality	NHL team	College/junior/club team
262	Peter Flache (C)	Canada	Chicago Blackhawks (from Atlanta)^{1}	Guelph Storm (OHL)
263	Thomas Ziegler (C)	Switzerland	Tampa Bay Lightning (from Minnesota via New Jersey)^{2}	HC Ambri-Piotta (Switzerland)
264	Dimitri Altaryov (LW)	Russia	New York Islanders (from Columbus)^{3}	Dizel Penza (Russia)
265	Jean-Philippe Cote (D)	Canada	Toronto Maple Leafs (from Tampa Bay)^{4}	Cape Breton Screaming Eagles (QMJHL)
266	Sean Kotary (C)	United States	Colorado Avalanche (from New York Islanders)^{5}	Northwood Prep High School (USHS-MA)
267	Tomi Pettinen (D)	Finland	New York Islanders (from Nashville)^{6}	Ilves (Finland)
268	Pavel Kolarik (D)	Czech Republic	Boston Bruins	Slavia Praha (Czech Republic)
269	Martin Richter (D)	Czech Republic	New York Rangers	SaiPa (Czech Republic)
270	Micki DuPont (D)	Canada	Calgary Flames	Kamloops Blazers (WHL)
271	Reto Von Arx (LW)	Switzerland	Chicago Blackhawks	HC Davos (Switzerland)
272	Tim Smith (C)	Canada	Vancouver Canucks	Spokane Chiefs (WHL)
273	Roman Simicek (C)	Czech Republic	Pittsburgh Penguins (from Anaheim)^{7}	HPK (Finland)
274	Evgeny Muratov (LW)	Russia	Edmonton Oilers (compensatory)^{8}	Neftechimik Nizhnekamsk (Russia)
275	Jonathan Gauthier (D)	Canada	Montreal Canadiens	Rouyn-Noranda Huskies (QMJHL)
276	Troy Ferguson (RW)	Canada	Carolina Hurricanes	Michigan State University (CCHA)
277	Ryan Courtney (LW)	Canada	Buffalo Sabres	Windsor Spitfires(OHL)
278	Martin Paroulek (RW)	Czech Republic	Columbus Blue Jackets (from San Jose)^{9}	HC Vsetin (Czech Republic)
279	Andreas Lindstrom (LW)	Sweden	Boston Bruins (from Edmonton)^{10}	Lulea HF (Sweden)
280	Nick Boucher (G)	Canada	Pittsburgh Penguins	Dartmouth College (ECAC)
281	Peter Fabus (C)	Slovakia	Phoenix Coyotes	Dukla Trencin (Slovakia)
282	Carl Grahn (G)	Finland	Los Angeles Kings	KalPa Jr. (Finland)
283	James DeMone (D)	Canada	Ottawa Senators	Portland Winterhawks (WHL)
284	Martin Hohener (D)	Switzerland	Nashville Predators (compensatory)^{11}	Kloten Flyers (Switzerland)
285	Blake Ward (G)	Canada	Colorado Avalanche	Tri-Cities Americans (WHL)
286	Andrej Nedorost (C)	Slovakia	Columbus Blue Jackets (from Florida)^{12}	Dukla Trencin Jr. (Slovakia)
287	Milan Kopecky (LW)	Czech Republic	Philadelphia Flyers (from Toronto via Tampa Bay)^{13}	Slavia Praha Jr. (Czech Republic)
288	Mark McRae (D)	Canada	Atlanta Thrashers (from Dallas)^{14}	Cornell University (ECAC)
289	Bjorn Nord (D)	Sweden	Washington Capitals (from Washington via Calgary)^{15}	Djurgardens IF (Sweden)
290	Simon Gamache (C)	Canada	Atlanta Thrashers (from New Jersey)^{16}	Val-d'Or Foreurs(QMJHL)
291	Arne Ramholt (D)	Switzerland	Chicago Blackhawks (from Philadelphia)^{17}	Kloten Flyers (Switzerland)
292	Louis Mandeville (D)	Canada	Columbus Blue Jackets (from Detroit)^{18}	Rouyn-Noranda Huskies (QMJHL)
293	Lauri Kinos (D)	Finland	St. Louis Blues	Montreal Rocket (QMJHL)

1. Atlanta's ninth-round pick went to Chicago as the result of a trade on June 24, 2000, that sent the rights to Ben Simon to Atlanta in exchange for this pick.
2. New Jersey's acquired ninth-round pick went to Tampa Bay as the result of a trade on June 25, 2000, that sent an eighth-round pick in the 2001 entry draft to New Jersey in exchange for this pick.
  New Jersey previously acquired this pick as the result of a trade on June 23, 2000, that sent the Brad Bombardir to Minnesota in exchange for Chris Terreri and this pick.
3. Columbus's ninth-round pick went to the Islanders as the result of a trade on May 11, 2000, that sent Chris Nielsen to Columbus in exchange for a fourth-round pick in the 2000 Entry Draft and this pick.
4. Tampa Bay's ninth-round pick went to Toronto as the result of a trade on August 5, 1999, that sent Jeff Reese and a ninth-round pick (#287 overall) in the 2000 Entry Draft to Tampa Bay in exchange for this pick.
5. The Islanders' ninth-round pick went to Colorado as the result of a trade on June 26, 1999, that sent a ninth-round pick in the 1999 entry draft to the Islanders in exchange for this pick.
6. Nashville's ninth-round pick went to the Islanders as the result of a trade on March 14, 2000, that sent Petr Šachl to Nashville in exchange for this pick.
7. Anaheim's ninth-round pick went to Pittsburgh as the result of a trade on January 29, 2000, that sent Kip Miller to Anaheim in exchange for this pick.
8. Edmonton acquired this pick as the result of a compensation for Phoenix signing Bob Essensa as a free agent on September 5, 1999.
9. San Jose's ninth-round pick went to Columbus as the result of a trade on June 11, 2000, that sent future considerations (protection of Evgeni Nabokov in 2000 NHL expansion draft) to San Jose in exchange for Jan Caloun, a conditional pick in the 2001 entry draft and this pick.
10. Edmonton's ninth-round pick went to Boston as the result of a trade on June 25, 2000, that sent a ninth-round pick in the 2001 entry draft to Edmonton in exchange for this pick.
11. Nashville acquired this pick as the result of a compensation for Washington signing Rob Zettler as a free agent on September 7, 1999.
12. Florida's ninth-round pick went to Columbus as the result of a trade on June 25, 2000, that sent a ninth-round pick in the 2001 entry draft to Florida in exchange for this pick.
13. Tampa Bay's acquired ninth-round pick went to Philadelphia as the result of a trade on June 25, 2000, that sent a fourth-round pick in the 2000 Entry Draft to Tampa Bay in exchange for sixth and seventh-round picks in the 2000 Entry Draft along with this pick.
  Tampa Bay previously acquired this pick as the result of a trade on August 5, 1999, that sent a ninth-round pick (#265 overall) in the 2000 Entry Draft to Toronto in exchange for Jeff Reese and this pick.
14. Dallas' ninth-round pick went to Atlanta as the result of a trade on December 15, 1999, that sent Kevin Dean to Dallas in exchange for and this pick.
15. Washington re-acquired this pick as the result of a trade on March 22, 1999, that sent Tom Chorske to Calgary in exchange for a seventh-round pick in the 2000 Entry Draft and this pick.
  Calgary previously acquired this pick as the result of a trade on August 7, 1998, that sent the Rick Tabaracci to the Calgary in exchange for this pick and future considerations.
16. New Jersey's ninth-round pick went to Atlanta as the result of a trade on June 12, 2000, that sent Steve Staios to New Jersey in exchange for and this pick.
17. Philadelphia's ninth-round pick went to Chicago as the result of a trade on June 12, 2000, that sent Mark Janssens to Philadelphia in exchange for and this pick.
18. Detroit's ninth-round pick went to Columbus as the result of a trade on June 25, 2000, that sent a ninth-round pick in the 2002 entry draft to Detroit in exchange for this pick.

== Draftees based on nationality ==
Rank	Country	Picks	Percent	Top selection
	North America	158	53.9%	
1	Canada	103	35.2%	Dany Heatley, 2nd
2	United States	55	18.8%	Rick DiPietro, 1st
	Europe	131	44.7%	
3	Russia	42	14.3%	Nikita Alexeev, 8th
4	Czech Republic	23	7.8%	Rostislav Klesla, 4th
5	Sweden	22	7.5%	Lars Jonsson, 7th
6	Finland	19	6.5%	Teemu Laine, 39th
7	Slovakia	15	5.1%	Marian Gaborik, 3rd
8	Switzerland	6	2.0%	Sven Helfenstein, 175th
10	Latvia	2	0.7%	Agris Saviels, 63rd
11	Hungary	1	0.3%	Levente Szuper, 116th
11	United Kingdom	1	0.3%	Colin Shields, 195th
11	Austria	1	0.3%	Reinhard Divis, 261st
11	Slovenia	1	0.3%	Jure Penko, 203rd
	Asia	4	1.4%	
9	Kazakhstan	3	1.0%	Dmitri Upper, 136th
11	Israel	1	0.3%	Max Birbraer, 67th

== See also ==
- 2000 NHL expansion draft
- 2000–01 NHL season
- List of NHL first overall draft choices
- List of NHL players
