= Määttä =

Määttä is a Finnish surname. Notable people with the surname include:

- Eilert Määttä (1935–2011), Swedish professional ice hockey player and coach
- Isak Dybvik Määttä (born 2001), Norwegian footballer of Finnish descent
- Olli Määttä (born 1994), Finnish professional ice hockey player
- Pirkko Määttä (born 1959), Finnish cross-country skier
- Tero Määttä (born 1982), Finnish ice hockey player
