= Drozdetsky =

Drozdetsky (masculine, Russian: Дроздецкий) or Drozdetskaya (feminine, Russian: Дроздецкая) is a Russian surname. Notable people with the surname include:

- Alexander Drozdetsky (born 1981), Russian ice hockey player, son of Nikolai
- Nikolai Drozdetsky (1957–1995), Russian ice hockey player, father of Alexander
