= Höhener =

Höhener is a surname. Notable people with the surname include:

- Martin Höhener (born 1980), Swiss ice hockey player
- Stefan Höhener (born 1980), Swiss luger
