= Brad Ference =

Canadian ice hockey player (born 1979)

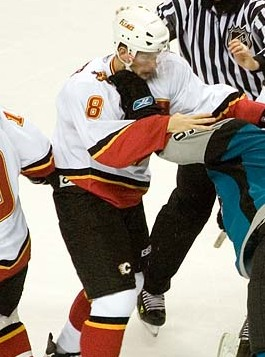
- Born: April 2, 1979 (age 47) Calgary, Alberta, Canada
- Height: 6 ft 3 in (191 cm)
- Weight: 218 lb (99 kg; 15 st 8 lb)
- Position: Defence
- Shot: Right
- Played for: Florida Panthers; Phoenix Coyotes; Calgary Flames; HC Morzine-Avoriaz
- National team: Canada
- NHL draft: 10th overall, 1997; Vancouver Canucks
- Playing career: 1999–2008

Bradley William Ference (born April 2, 1979) is a Canadian former professional ice hockey defenceman who played 250 games in the National Hockey League (NHL).

== Playing career ==
Born in Calgary, Alberta, Ference played junior hockey with the Spokane Chiefs, and Tri-City Americans of the Western Hockey League. Ference was drafted in the first round, 10th overall, of the 1997 NHL entry draft by the Vancouver Canucks.

Before ever playing a game for the Canucks, Ference was traded on January 17, 1999, along with Pavel Bure, Bret Hedican and third-round selection in the 2000 NHL entry draft (Robert Fried) to the Florida Panthers for Dave Gagner, Ed Jovanovski, Mike Brown, Kevin Weekes and a first-round selection in the 2000 NHL entry draft (Nathan Smith).

Ference spent nearly four years in the Panthers organization before being traded to the Phoenix Coyotes on March 8, 2003, for Darcy Hordichuk and a second-round selection in the 2003 NHL entry draft.

After a year and half with the Coyotes, and the lock-out year of 2004–2005 spent in France, Ference was traded to the New Jersey Devils on November 25, 2005, for Pascal Rheaume, Ray Schultz and Steven Spencer. He was on the move again at the end of the season, signing a one-year contract as an unrestricted free agent on July 26, 2006, with the Calgary Flames.

After Ference's contract with the Flames ended he was signed by the Detroit Red Wings and spent a year with their AHL affiliate, the Grand Rapids Griffins.

Ference was offered a 1-year deal from Anyang Halla of Asia League Ice Hockey in summer of 2008, but did not sign as his wife was pregnant. Ference retired from professional hockey in 2008, returned to Calgary, and began a new career as a firefighter in 2009.

== Career statistics ==
=== Regular season and playoffs ===
			Regular season					Playoffs
Season	Team	League	GP	G	A	Pts	PIM	GP	G	A	Pts	PIM
1994–95	Calgary Royals AAA	CBHL	60	19	47	66	220	—	—	—	—	—
1995–96	Calgary Royals AAA	CBHL	22	7	21	28	140	—	—	—	—	—
1995–96	Spokane Chiefs	WHL	5	0	2	2	18	—	—	—	—	—
1996–97	Spokane Chiefs	WHL	67	6	20	26	324	9	0	4	4	21
1997–98	Spokane Chiefs	WHL	54	9	29	38	213	18	0	7	7	59
1998–99	Spokane Chiefs	WHL	31	3	22	25	125	—	—	—	—	—
1998–99	Tri-City Americans	WHL	20	6	15	21	116	12	1	9	10	63
1999–2000	Louisville Panthers	AHL	58	2	7	9	231	2	0	0	0	2
1999–2000	Florida Panthers	NHL	13	0	2	2	46	—	—	—	—	—
2000–01	Louisville Panthers	AHL	52	3	21	24	200	—	—	—	—	—
2000–01	Florida Panthers	NHL	14	0	1	1	14	—	—	—	—	—
2001–02	Florida Panthers	NHL	80	2	15	17	254	—	—	—	—	—
2002–03	Florida Panthers	NHL	60	2	6	8	118	—	—	—	—	—
2002–03	Phoenix Coyotes	NHL	15	0	1	1	28	—	—	—	—	—
2003–04	Phoenix Coyotes	NHL	63	0	5	5	103	—	—	—	—	—
2004–05	Pingouins de Morzine-Avoriaz	FRA	17	2	10	12	138	4	1	4	5	10
2005–06	San Antonio Rampage	AHL	19	2	9	11	39	—	—	—	—	—
2005–06	Albany River Rats	AHL	43	3	8	11	96	—	—	—	—	—
2006–07	Omaha Ak-Sar-Ben Knights	AHL	73	3	23	26	210	6	0	0	0	6
2006–07	Calgary Flames	NHL	5	0	0	0	2	—	—	—	—	—
2007–08	Grand Rapids Griffins	AHL	32	1	1	2	78	—	—	—	—	—
AHL totals			277	14	69	83	854	8	0	0	0	8
NHL totals			250	4	30	34	565	—	—	—	—	—

=== International ===
Year	Team	Event	Result	GP	G	A	Pts	PIM
1998	Canada	WJC	8th	7	0	1	1	6
1999	Canada	WJC	2nd place, silver medalist(s)	7	0	2	2	25
2002	Canada	WC	6th	6	0	0	0	4
Junior totals				14	0	3	3	31
Senior totals				6	0	0	0	4

Awards and achievements
Preceded by Josh Holden	Vancouver Canucks first-round draft pick 1997	Succeeded by Bryan Allen
