= Matúš Kostúr =

Slovak ice hockey player

Matus Kostur
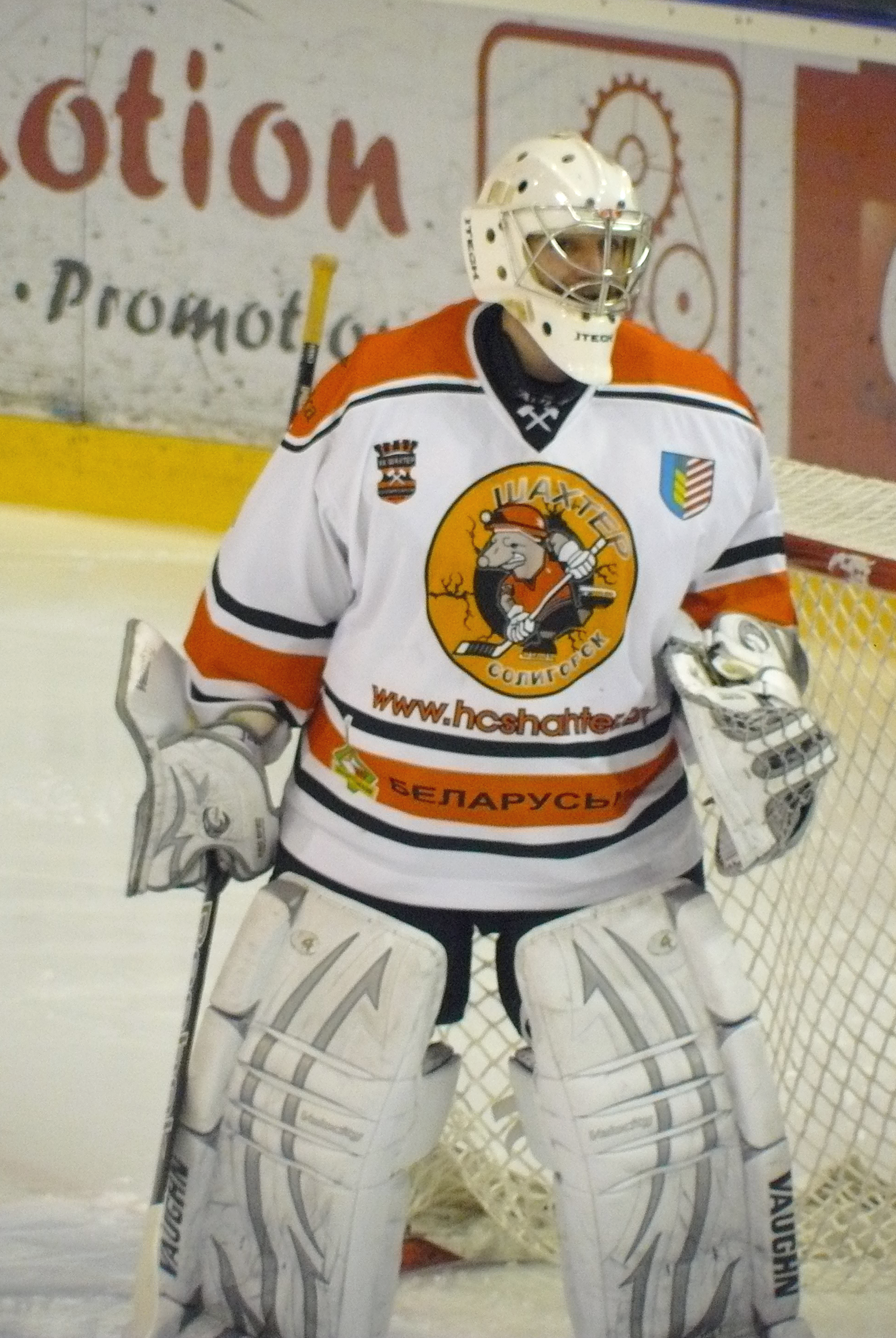
- Born: March 28, 1980 (age 46) Banská Bystrica, Czechoslovakia
- Height: 6 ft 0 in (183 cm)
- Weight: 187 lb (85 kg; 13 st 5 lb)
- Position: Goaltender
- Caught: Left
- Played for: AHL; Albany River Rats; ECHL; Columbus Cottonmouths; Augusta Lynx; KHL; HC Dinamo Minsk
- NHL draft: 164th overall, 2000; New Jersey Devils
- Playing career: 1999–2017

Matus Kostur (born March 28, 1980) is a Slovak former professional ice hockey goaltender. He was selected by the New Jersey Devils in the 5th round (164th overall) of the 2000 NHL entry draft.

Kostur made his Kontinental Hockey League debut playing with HC Dinamo Minsk debut during the 2008–09 KHL season.
