= Tuukka Mäkelä =

Finnish ice hockey player

- Born: 24 May 1982 (age 44) Helsinki, Finland
- Height: 6 ft 2 in (188 cm)
- Weight: 227 lb (103 kg; 16 st 3 lb)
- Position: Defence
- Shoots: Left
- Serie A team Former teams: Val Pusteria Wolves; HIFK; Peliitat; Nottingham Panthers; HPK; Pelicans; Lukko
- NHL draft: 66th overall, 2000; Boston Bruins
- Playing career: 2001–present

Tuukka Mäkelä (born 24 May 1982) is a Finnish professional ice hockey defenceman who currently plays for Val Pusteria Wolves of Serie A, the top tier ice hockey league in Italy. He played for the team previously, during the 2012–2013 season.

== Career statistics ==
=== Regular season and playoffs ===
			Regular season					Playoffs
Season	Team	League	GP	G	A	Pts	PIM	GP	G	A	Pts	PIM
1997–98	HIFK	FIN U18	5	0	0	0	4	—	—	—	—	—
1998–99	HIFK	FIN U18	19	1	1	2	12	3	0	1	1	0
1998–99	HIFK	FIN U20	13	0	0	0	8	—	—	—	—	—
1999–2000	HIFK	FIN U20	37	2	5	7	22	2	0	0	0	0
2000–01	Montreal Rocket	QMJHL	9	2	1	3	14	—	—	—	—	—
2001–02	HPK	FIN U20	12	3	0	3	26	7	2	2	4	18
2001–02	HPK	SM-liiga	49	2	3	5	44	8	0	0	0	10
2002–03	HPK	SM-liiga	51	1	5	6	86	13	0	0	0	14
2003–04	HPK	SM-liiga	54	3	1	4	44	8	0	1	1	6
2004–05	HPK	SM-liiga	39	2	2	4	34	8	0	0	0	31
2005–06	Lukko	SM-liiga	34	1	2	3	72	—	—	—	—	—
2006–07	Lukko	SM-liiga	55	0	4	4	87	3	0	0	0	0
2007–08	Pelicans	SM-liiga	53	1	3	4	158	5	0	0	0	0
2008–09	HPK	SM-liiga	56	0	3	3	118	6	0	1	1	4
2009–10	HPK	SM-liiga	53	2	3	5	58	17	0	0	0	14
2010–11	HPK	SM-liiga	25	1	0	1	18	2	1	0	1	0
2011–12	HPK	SM-liiga	46	3	5	8	54	—	—	—	—	—
2012–13	HC Pustertal Wölfe	ITA	26	3	10	13	30	10	0	0	0	14
2013–14	Nottingham Panthers	EIHL	4	0	1	1	36	—	—	—	—	—
2013–14	Peliitat	Mestis	2	1	0	1	0	—	—	—	—	—
2013–14	HIFK	Liiga	19	1	2	3	24	—	—	—	—	—
2014–15	HC Pustertal Wölfe	ITA	38	6	5	11	46	11	1	2	3	22
SM-liiga/Liiga totals			534	17	33	50	797	70	1	2	3	79

=== International ===
Year	Team	Event	GP	G	A	Pts	PIM
2000	Finland	WJC18	7	1	1	2	22
Junior totals			7	1	1	2	22
