= Joni Puurula =

Finnish ice hockey player

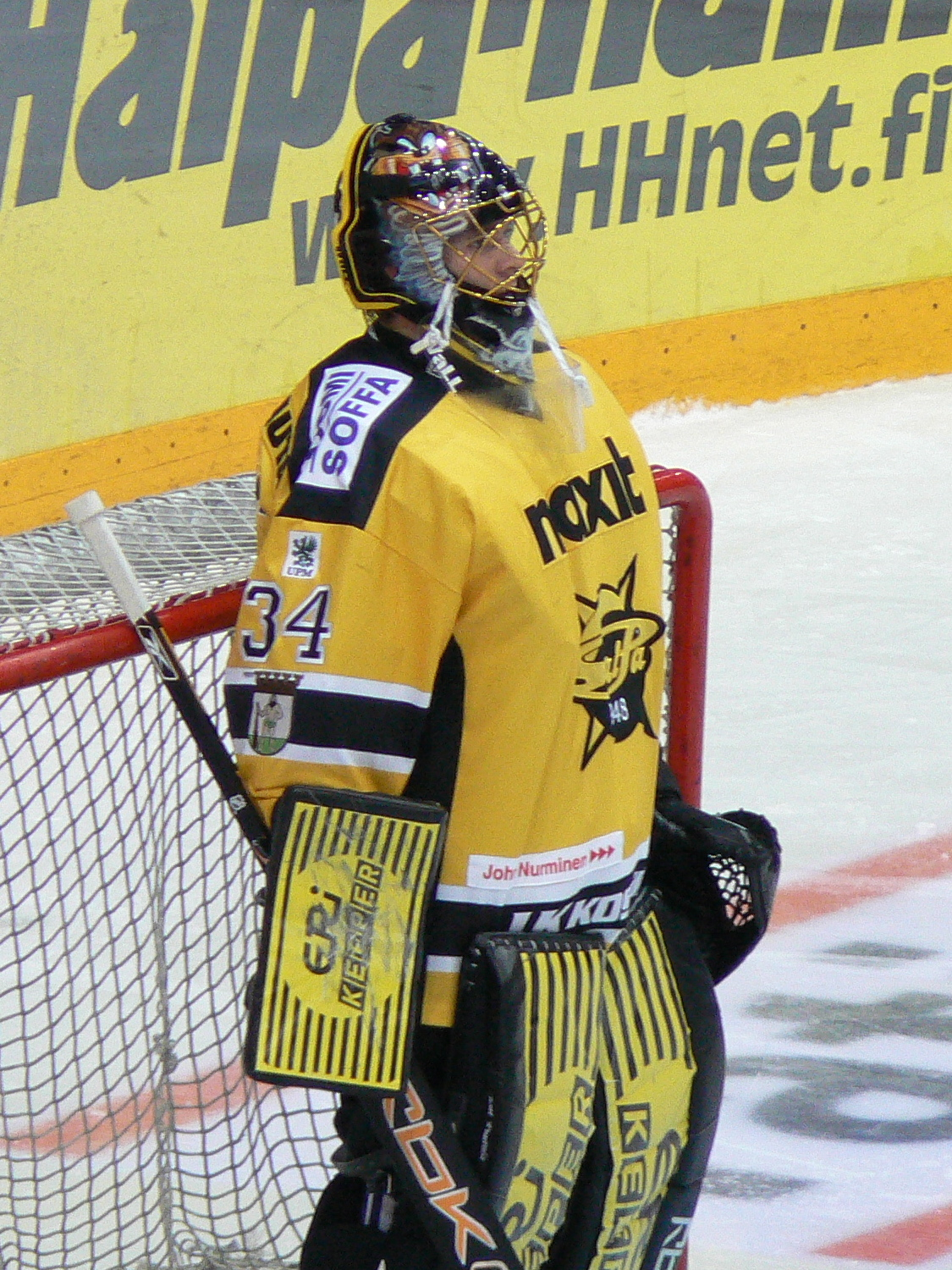
- Born: August 4, 1982 (age 43) Kokkola, Finland
- Height: 5 ft 11 in (180 cm)
- Weight: 196 lb (89 kg; 14 st 0 lb)
- Position: Goaltender
- Caught: Left
- Played for: HPK; Salavat Yulaev Ufa; TPS; SaiPa; Jokerit; AaB Ishockey; Arlan Kokshetau; STS Sanok; SG Cortina
- NHL draft: 243rd overall, 2000; Montreal Canadiens
- Playing career: 2001–2017

Joni Juho Paavali Puurula (born August 4, 1982) is a Finnish former ice hockey goaltender. He was selected in the eighth round, 243rd overall, by the Montreal Canadiens in the 2000 NHL entry draft.

Puurula made his SM-liiga debut playing with HPK during the 2000–01 SM-liiga season.
