= Alexander Seluyanov =

Russian ice hockey player (born 1982)

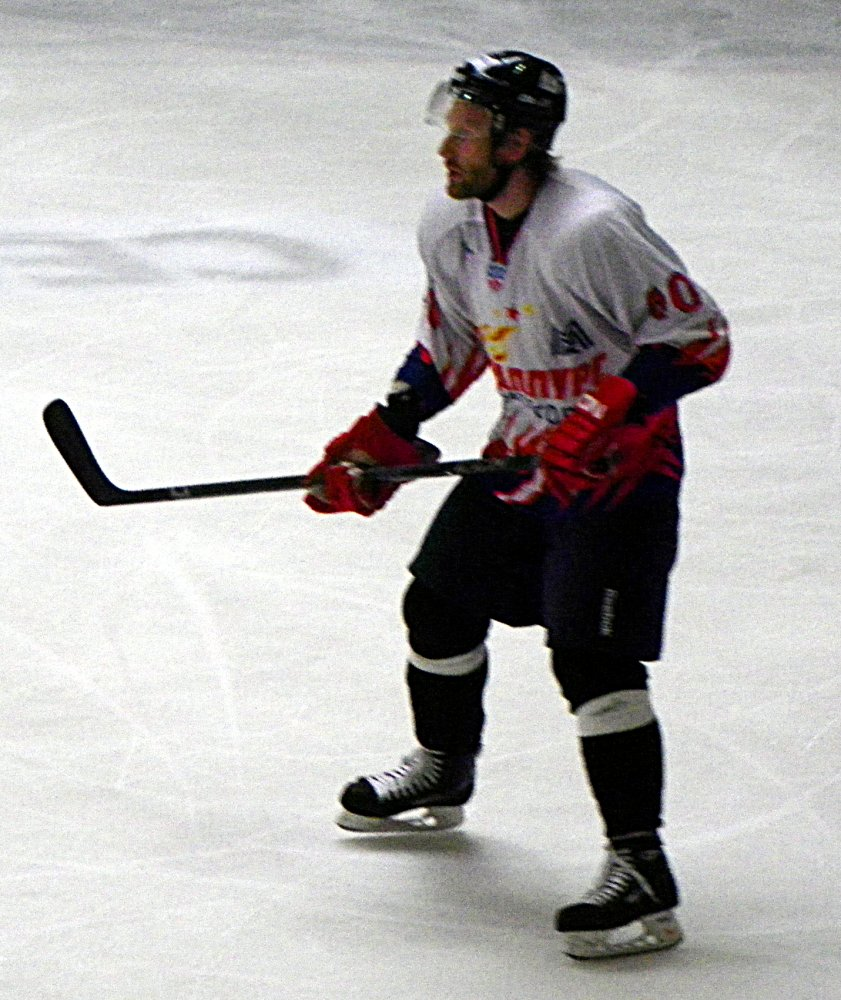
- Born: March 24, 1982 (age 44) Ufa, Russia
- Height: 6 ft 2 in (188 cm)
- Weight: 190 lb (86 kg; 13 st 8 lb)
- Position: Defence
- Shot: Right
- KHL team Former teams: Avtomobilist Yekaterinburg; RSL; Salavat Yulaev Ufa; HC Lada Togliatti; Metallurg Magnitogorsk; KHL; Metallurg Magnitogorsk; HC Dynamo Moscow; Torpedo Nizhny Novgorod; HC Ugra; HC Neftekhimik Nizhnekamsk
- NHL draft: 128th overall, 2000; Detroit Red Wings
- Playing career: 1999–2014

Alexander Seluyanov (born March 24, 1982) is a Russian professional ice hockey defenceman. He was selected by the Detroit Red Wings in the 4th round (128th overall) of the 2000 NHL entry draft.

Seluyanov made his Kontinental Hockey League debut playing with Metallurg Magnitogorsk during the inaugural 2008–09 KHL season.

His younger brother Vyacheslav Seluyanov is also an ice hockey player.

== Career statistics ==
=== Regular season and playoffs ===
| | | | Regular season | | | | | Playoffs |
| Season | Team | League | GP | G | A | Pts | PIM | GP | G | A | Pts | PIM |
|---|---|---|---|---|---|---|---|---|---|---|---|---|
| 1997–98 | Novoil Ufa | RUS.3 | 19 | 0 | 1 | 1 | 8 | — | — | — | — | — |
| 1998–99 | Novoil Ufa | RUS.3 | 20 | 3 | 3 | 6 | 8 | — | — | — | — | — |
| 1999–2000 | Salavat Yulaev Ufa | RSL | 14 | 1 | 3 | 4 | 4 | — | — | — | — | — |
| 1999–2000 | Salavat Yulaev–2 Ufa | RUS.3 | 18 | 3 | 4 | 7 | 10 | — | — | — | — | — |
| 2000–01 | Salavat Yulaev Ufa | RSL | 30 | 0 | 3 | 3 | 10 | — | — | — | — | — |
| 2000–01 | Salavat Yulaev–2 Ufa | RUS.3 | 12 | 2 | 7 | 9 | 16 | — | — | — | — | — |
| 2001–02 | Lada Togliatti | RSL | 6 | 0 | 0 | 0 | 0 | — | — | — | — | — |
| 2001–02 | Lada–2 Togliatti | RUS.3 | 28 | 3 | 7 | 10 | 22 | — | — | — | — | — |
| 2001–02 | CSK VVS Samara | RUS.2 | 20 | 1 | 5 | 6 | 56 | — | — | — | — | — |
| 2002–03 | Lada Togliatti | RSL | 26 | 2 | 4 | 6 | 12 | 4 | 0 | 0 | 0 | 4 |
| 2002–03 | Lada–2 Togliatti | RUS.3 | 4 | 0 | 1 | 1 | 2 | — | — | — | — | — |
| 2002–03 | CSK VVS Samara | RUS.2 | 16 | 4 | 4 | 8 | 34 | — | — | — | — | — |
| 2003–04 | Lada Togliatti | RSL | 45 | 1 | 3 | 4 | 20 | 2 | 0 | 0 | 0 | 0 |
| 2003–04 | Lada–2 Togliatti | RUS.3 | 9 | 2 | 2 | 4 | 16 | 4 | 1 | 0 | 1 | 0 |
| 2004–05 | Lada Togliatti | RSL | 52 | 6 | 5 | 11 | 41 | 8 | 1 | 0 | 1 | 6 |
| 2004–05 | Lada–2 Togliatti | RUS.3 | 1 | 0 | 0 | 0 | 2 | — | — | — | — | — |
| 2005–06 | Metallurg Magnitogorsk | RSL | 50 | 3 | 5 | 8 | 44 | 11 | 1 | 0 | 1 | 4 |
| 2006–07 | Metallurg Magnitogorsk | RSL | 54 | 5 | 12 | 17 | 102 | 15 | 2 | 6 | 8 | 16 |
| 2007–08 | Metallurg Magnitogorsk | RSL | 53 | 3 | 10 | 13 | 50 | 7 | 0 | 1 | 1 | 2 |
| 2008–09 | Metallurg Magnitogorsk | KHL | 44 | 3 | 13 | 16 | 43 | — | — | — | — | — |
| 2009–10 | Metallurg Magnitogorsk | KHL | 45 | 4 | 19 | 23 | 38 | 10 | 0 | 1 | 1 | 8 |
| 2010–11 | Metallurg Magnitogorsk | KHL | 2 | 0 | 0 | 0 | 2 | — | — | — | — | — |
| 2010–11 | Dynamo Moscow | KHL | 26 | 0 | 2 | 2 | 14 | — | — | — | — | — |
| 2011–12 | Torpedo Nizhny Novgorod | KHL | 8 | 0 | 2 | 2 | 2 | — | — | — | — | — |
| 2011–12 | HC Yugra | KHL | 34 | 2 | 7 | 9 | 32 | 5 | 0 | 2 | 2 | 6 |
| 2012–13 | Neftekhimik Nizhnekamsk | KHL | 47 | 2 | 13 | 15 | 81 | 3 | 0 | 0 | 0 | 6 |
| 2013–14 | Avtomobilist Yekaterinburg | KHL | 15 | 0 | 1 | 1 | 4 | — | — | — | — | — |
| RSL totals | | | 330 | 21 | 45 | 66 | 283 | 50 | 4 | 8 | 12 | 38 |
| KHL totals | | | 221 | 11 | 57 | 68 | 216 | 18 | 0 | 3 | 3 | 20 |

=== International ===
| Year | Team | Event | GP | G | A | Pts | PIM |
|---|---|---|---|---|---|---|---|
| 2000 | Russia | WJC18 | 6 | 0 | 1 | 1 | 4 |
| 2001 | Russia | WJC | 7 | 0 | 2 | 2 | 4 |
| Junior totals | | | 13 | 0 | 3 | 3 | 8 |
