= Carl Grahn =

Finnish ice hockey player

- Born: January 8, 1981 (age 45) Landshut, Finland
- Height: 6 ft 0 in (183 cm)
- Weight: 194 lb (88 kg; 13 st 12 lb)
- Position: Goaltender
- Caught: Left
- Played for: SM-liiga; KalPa; Lahti Pelicans
- NHL draft: 282nd overall, 2000; Los Angeles Kings
- Playing career: 1998–2008

Carl Grahn (born January 8, 1981) is a Finnish former professional ice hockey goaltender. He was selected by the Los Angeles Kings in the 9th round (282nd overall) of the 2000 NHL entry draft.

Grahn played 24 games in the SM-liiga with KalPa and the Lahti Pelicans.
