= Dimitri Altaryov =

Russian ice hockey player (born 1980)

- Born: August 13, 1980 (age 45) Penza, Russian SFSR
- Height: 6 ft 3 in (191 cm)
- Weight: 196 lb (89 kg; 14 st 0 lb)
- Position: Left wing
- Shot: Left
- Played for: Torpedo Nizhny Novgorod; HC Yugra; Metallurg Magnitogorsk
- NHL draft: 264th overall, 2000; New York Islanders
- Playing career: 1998–2015

Dimitri Altaryov (Russian: Дмитрий Алтарёв) also transliterated as Dmitry Altaryov and sometimes Dmitri Altarev (born August 13, 1980) is a Russian former professional ice hockey winger who most notably playing in the Kontinental Hockey League (KHL).

He was selected by the New York Islanders in the 9th round (264th overall) of the 2000 NHL entry draft.

== Career statistics ==
			Regular season					Playoffs
Season	Team	League	GP	G	A	Pts	PIM	GP	G	A	Pts	PIM
1996–97	Dizel–2 Penza	RUS.3	57	6	3	9	58	—	—	—	—	—
1997–98	Dizel–2 Penza	RUS.3	57	15	8	23	83	—	—	—	—	—
1998–99	Dizel Penza	RUS.2	35	4	3	7	30	—	—	—	—	—
1998–99	Dizel–2 Penza	RUS.3	6	2	0	2	8	—	—	—	—	—
1999–2000	Dizel Penza	RUS.2	44	10	7	7	40	—	—	—	—	—
2000–01	Torpedo Nizhny Novgorod	RSL	36	1	2	3	26	—	—	—	—	—
2000–01	Torpedo–2 Nizhny Novgorod	RUS.3	5	3	3	6	10	—	—	—	—	—
2001–02	Torpedo Nizhny Novgorod	RSL	32	2	3	5	42	—	—	—	—	—
2001–02	Torpedo–2 Nizhny Novgorod	RUS.3	10	5	6	11	12	—	—	—	—	—
2002–03	Dizel–2 Penza	RUS.3	47	26	27	53	108	—	—	—	—	—
2003–04	Dizel Penza	RUS.2	56	19	20	39	86	4	1	0	1	8
2004–05	Dizel Penza	RUS.2	52	13	11	24	72	4	1	0	1	8
2005–06	Dizel Penza	RUS.2	52	19	23	42	84	13	5	5	10	37
2006–07	Torpedo Nizhny Novgorod	RUS.2	43	14	22	36	32	14	5	3	8	12
2007–08	Torpedo Nizhny Novgorod	RSL	5	1	1	2	6	—	—	—	—	—
2007–08	Torpedo–2 Nizhny Novgorod	RUS.3	10	8	9	17	6	—	—	—	—	—
2008–09	HC Yugra	RUS.2	52	17	19	36	54	15	4	1	5	12
2009–10	HC Yugra	RUS.2	38	16	10	26	28	6	0	3	3	2
2010–11	HC Yugra	KHL	52	9	9	18	24	6	2	1	3	4
2011–12	Metallurg Magnitogorsk	KHL	14	0	1	1	10	—	—	—	—	—
2011–12	HC Yugra	KHL	25	4	6	10	12	5	1	2	3	0
2012–13	HC Yugra	KHL	43	5	11	16	61	4	0	2	2	14
2013–14	Rubin Tyumen	VHL	32	7	6	13	8	22	2	2	4	14
2014–15	Rubin Tyumen	VHL	27	0	2	2	14	—	—	—	—	—
RUS.2 & VHL totals			431	119	123	242	448	81	20	15	35	93
RSL totals			73	4	6	10	74	—	—	—	—	—
KHL totals			134	18	27	45	107	15	3	5	8	18
