= Peter Flache =

Canadian professional ice hockey Forward

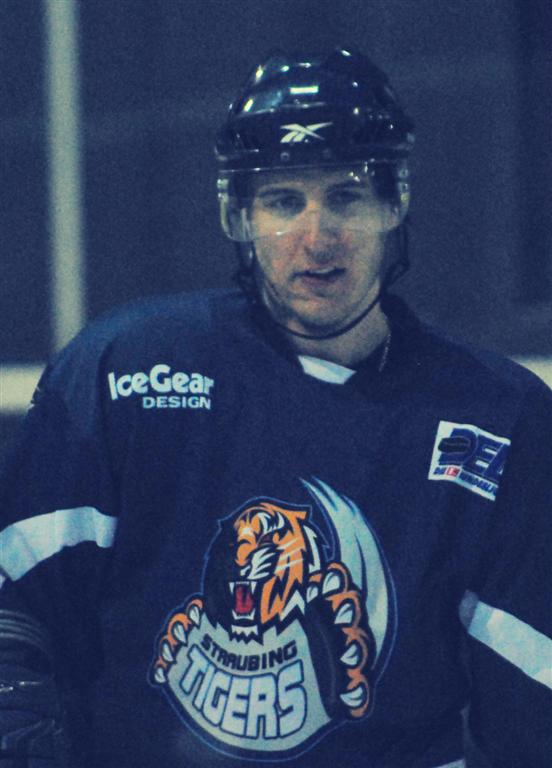
- Born: March 4, 1982 (age 44) Toronto, Ontario, Canada
- Height: 6 ft 5 in (196 cm)
- Weight: 210 lb (95 kg; 15 st 0 lb)
- Position: Centre
- Shot: Left
- DEL team Former teams: Straubing Tigers; Adler Mannheim; Augsburger Panther
- NHL draft: 262nd overall, 2000; Chicago Blackhawks
- Playing career: 2003–2022

Peter Flache (born 4 March 1982) is a Canadian former professional ice hockey Forward and current head coach of Eisbären Regensburg, for whom he played last in the 2021/22 season.

Born in Toronto, Ontario, Flache was taken in the OHL Priority Selection by the Guelph Storm in the 6th Round (123rd overall) in 1999. He was later selected in the 2000 NHL entry draft by the Chicago Blackhawks, 262nd overall. On July 23, 2010, Flache returned to Germany from the Port Huron Icehawks to sign a one-year contract with Augsburger Panther of the DEL.

== Career statistics ==
			Regular season					Playoffs
Season	Team	League	GP	G	A	Pts	PIM	GP	G	A	Pts	PIM
1999–2000	Guelph Storm	OHL	56	3	6	9	40	—	—	—	—	—
2000–01	Guelph Storm	OHL	55	3	3	6	27	4	1	0	1	0
2001–02	North Bay Centennials	OHL	59	7	8	15	92	4	0	2	2	8
2002–03	Saginaw Spirit	OHL	68	8	20	28	157	—	—	—	—	—
2002–03	Greenville Grrrowl	ECHL	3	2	1	3	9	4	3	0	3	2
2003–04	Greenville Grrrowl	ECHL	27	6	5	11	37	—	—	—	—	—
2003–04	Toledo Storm	ECHL	34	6	5	11	35	—	—	—	—	—
2004–05	Gwinnett Gladiators	ECHL	60	8	29	37	81	—	—	—	—	—
2005–06	Dartmouth Destroyers	CEHL	31	10	10	20	94	10	5	7	12	28
2006–07	St. Francis Xavier University	AUS	28	9	10	19	89	6	2	1	3	6
2007–08	Dayton Bombers	ECHL	37	5	10	15	114	—	—	—	—	—
2007–08	Eisbären Regensburg	GER.2	15	7	6	13	28	—	—	—	—	—
2008–09	Adler Mannheim	DEL	49	1	0	1	54	7	0	0	0	27
2009–10	Straubing Tigers	DEL	42	3	2	5	108	—	—	—	—	—
2009–10	Port Huron Icehawks	IHL	25	9	8	17	17	7	0	2	2	18
2010–11	Augsburger Panther	DEL	49	3	6	9	40	—	—	—	—	—
2011–12	Augsburger Panther	DEL	46	0	4	4	53	2	0	0	0	6
2012–13	Augsburger Panther	DEL	48	5	14	19	133	2	0	0	0	4
2013–14	Straubing Tigers	DEL	46	5	12	17	91	—	—	—	—	—
2014–15	Straubing Tigers	DEL	18	1	2	3	42	—	—	—	—	—
2014–15	EC Kassel Huskies	GER.2	27	7	14	21	74	5	0	0	0	29
2015–16	EV Regensburg	GER.3	40	30	36	66	66	12	7	10	17	18
2016–17	EV Regensburg	GER.3	39	30	24	54	145	4	1	1	2	8
2017–18	Eisbären Regensburg	GER.3	44	23	33	56	92	7	1	5	6	6
2018–19	Eisbären Regensburg	GER.3	47	27	30	57	56	3	1	1	2	2
2019–20	Eisbären Regensburg	GER.3	48	33	37	70	60	—	—	—	—	—
2020–21	Eisbären Regensburg	GER.3	34	28	20	48	42	—	—	—	—	—
2021–22	Eisbären Regensburg	GER.3	8	2	4	6	33	15	3	4	7	14
ECHL totals			161	27	50	77	276	4	3	0	3	2
DEL totals			298	18	40	58	521	11	0	0	0	37
GER.3 totals			260	173	184	357	494	41	13	21	34	48
