= Mats Christéen =

Swedish former professional ice hockey defenceman

- Born: 13 February 1982 (age 44) Södertälje, Sweden
- Height: 6 ft 1 in (185 cm)
- Weight: 194 lb (88 kg; 13 st 12 lb)
- Position: Defenceman
- Shot: Left
- Played for: Södertälje SK; Tierps HK; HC Örebro 90; AIK IF
- NHL draft: 236th overall, 2000; Nashville Predators
- Playing career: 2000–2007

Mats Christéen (born 13 February 1982) is a Swedish former professional ice hockey defenceman.

Christéen was drafted 236th overall by the Nashville Predators in the 2000 NHL entry draft though he never played in the National Hockey League. He played 16 games in Elitserien for his hometown team Södertälje SK between 2001 and 2003. He finished his career in 2007 after spending three seasons with AIK IF.

After retiring, Christéen opened a furniture shop in Brooklyn, New York called Foundrywood. He has also worked as a model.

== Career statistics ==
			Regular season					Playoffs
Season	Team	League	GP	G	A	Pts	PIM	GP	G	A	Pts	PIM
1999–2000	Södertälje SK	J18 Allsv	5	0	1	1	8	—	—	—	—	—
1999–2000	Södertälje SK	J20	30	1	0	1	30	4	1	0	1	6
2000–01	Södertälje SK	J20	19	2	8	10	16	3	2	0	2	0
2000–01	Södertälje SK	Allsv	15	0	3	3	4	—	—	—	—	—
2001–02	Södertälje SK	J20	16	3	6	9	47	2	0	0	0	4
2001–02	Södertälje SK	SEL	6	0	0	0	0	—	—	—	—	—
2001–02	Tierps HK	Allsv	15	3	1	4	14	—	—	—	—	—
2002–03	Södertälje SK	J20	13	3	3	6	62	—	—	—	—	—
2002–03	Södertälje SK	SEL	10	0	0	0	0	—	—	—	—	—
2002–03	HC Örebro 90	Allsv	9	2	0	2	10	—	—	—	—	—
2004–05	AIK	SWE.3	26	6	3	9	65	10	0	2	2	20
2005–06	AIK	Allsv	17	1	0	1	59	—	—	—	—	—
2006–07	AIK	Allsv	30	0	0	0	99	—	—	—	—	—
Allsv totals			86	6	4	10	186	—	—	—	—	—
SEL totals			16	0	0	0	0	—	—	—	—	—
