= Samu Isosalo =

Finnish ice hockey player (born 1981)

- Born: 10 June 1981 (age 45) Rauma, Finland
- Height: 6 ft 4 in (193 cm)
- Weight: 225 lb (102 kg; 16 st 1 lb)
- Position: Centre
- Shot: Left
- Played for: Lukko
- NHL draft: 230th overall, 2000; Atlanta Thrashers
- Playing career: 2000–2008

Samu Isosalo (born 10 June 1981) is a Finnish former professional ice hockey player. He played in the SM-liiga for Lukko and currently works as an assistant coach for the Lukko U-20 team. He was drafted 230th overall by the Atlanta Thrashers in the 2000 NHL Entry Draft.

== Career statistics ==
			Regular season					Playoffs
Season	Team	League	GP	G	A	Pts	PIM	GP	G	A	Pts	PIM
1996–97	Lukko	FIN U18	21	5	6	11	45	—	—	—	—	—
1997–98	Lukko	FIN U18	14	7	10	17	34	—	—	—	—	—
1997–98	Lukko	FIN U20	1	0	0	0	0	—	—	—	—	—
1998–99	North Bay Centennials	OHL	59	13	12	25	19	4	0	0	0	4
1999–2000	North Bay Centennials	OHL	48	17	25	42	26	3	0	0	0	0
2000–01	Lukko	FIN U20	14	11	9	20	42	3	1	0	1	0
2000–01	Lukko	SM-liiga	31	1	1	2	33	1	0	0	0	0
2000–01	UJK	Mestis	3	2	1	3	2	—	—	—	—	—
2001–02	Lukko	FIN U20	2	0	3	3	2	—	—	—	—	—
2001–02	Lukko	SM-liiga	4	0	0	0	2	—	—	—	—	—
2002–03	Lukko	SM-liiga	52	5	5	10	6	—	—	—	—	—
2005–06	Kiekko–Vantaa	Mestis	6	1	0	1	4	—	—	—	—	—
2005–06	TUTO Hockey	Mestis	14	10	5	15	6	—	—	—	—	—
2006–07	Nybro Vikings IF	Allsv	25	8	4	12	47	—	—	—	—	—
2007–08	Nybro Vikings IF	Allsv	6	0	1	1	2	—	—	—	—	—
SM-liiga totals			87	6	6	12	41	1	0	0	0	0
