= Vladimir Gorbunov =

Russian ice hockey player

- Born: 22 April 1982 (age 44) Moscow, Soviet Union
- Height: 6 ft 1 in (185 cm)
- Weight: 198 lb (90 kg; 14 st 2 lb)
- Position: Forward
- Shot: Left
- Played for: CSKA Moscow; Salavat Yulaev Ufa; HK MVD; Dynamo Moscow; Torpedo Nizhny Novgorod; HC Yugra; Avtomobilist Yekaterinburg
- NHL draft: 105th overall, 2000; New York Islanders
- Playing career: 1999–2014

Vladimir Vladimirovich Gorbunov (Russian: Владимир Владимирович Горбунов; born 22 April 1982) is a Russian former professional ice hockey player who played in the Kontinental Hockey League (KHL). He was selected by New York Islanders in the 4th round (105th overall) of the 2000 NHL entry draft.

== Career statistics ==
			Regular season					Playoffs
Season	Team	League	GP	G	A	Pts	PIM	GP	G	A	Pts	PIM
1999–2000	CSKA Moscow	RUS.2	40	11	7	18	32	—	—	—	—	—
1999–2000	CSKA–2 Moscow	RUS.3	9	9	5	14	10	—	—	—	—	—
2000–01	CSKA Moscow	RUS.2	43	10	14	24	63	—	—	—	—	—
2000–01	CSKA–2 Moscow	RUS.3	4	1	0	1	10	—	—	—	—	—
2001–02	CSKA Moscow	RUS.2	34	12	13	25	12	14	4	7	11	12
2001–02	CSKA–2 Moscow	RUS.3	3	1	1	2	0	—	—	—	—	—
2002–03	CSKA Moscow	RSL	35	5	5	10	46	—	—	—	—	—
2002–03	CSKA–2 Moscow	RUS.3	9	8	6	14	10	—	—	—	—	—
2003–04	CSKA Moscow	RSL	34	4	7	11	56	—	—	—	—	—
2003–04	CSKA–2 Moscow	RUS.3	28	5	14	19	44	—	—	—	—	—
2004–05	Salavat Yulaev Ufa	RSL	1	0	0	0	0	—	—	—	—	—
2004–05	Salavat Yulaev–2 Ufa	RUS.3	1	0	0	0	0	—	—	—	—	—
2004–05	HC MVD	RUS.2	36	4	15	19	48	11	2	1	3	8
2004–05	HC MVD–THK Tver	RUS.3	11	2	6	8	22	—	—	—	—	—
2005–06	HC MVD	RSL	44	3	4	7	146	4	2	0	2	8
2006–07	HC MVD	RSL	52	10	6	16	14	3	0	1	1	12
2007–08	CSKA Moscow	RSL	51	7	11	18	44	5	1	0	1	6
2007–08	CSKA–2 Moscow	RUS.3	—	—	—	—	—	1	0	0	0	0
2008–09	HC MVD	KHL	56	9	18	27	54	—	—	—	—	—
2009–10	HC MVD	KHL	54	8	9	17	70	21	1	2	3	10
2010–11	Dynamo Moscow	KHL	40	6	8	14	42	6	1	1	2	4
2011–12	Torpedo Nizhny Novgorod	KHL	54	6	7	13	66	12	1	1	2	14
2012–13	Torpedo Nizhny Novgorod	KHL	43	6	4	10	18	—	—	—	—	—
2013–14	HC Yugra	KHL	25	3	2	5	16	—	—	—	—	—
2013–14	Avtomobilist Yekaterinburg	KHL	1	0	0	0	0	3	0	0	0	0
RSL totals			217	29	33	62	306	12	3	1	4	26
KHL totals			273	38	48	86	268	42	3	4	7	28
