= Artyom Chernov =

Russian ice hockey player (1982–2020)

- Born: April 28, 1982 Novokuznetsk, USSR
- Died: 11 December 2020 (aged 38)
- Height: 5 ft 11 in (180 cm)
- Weight: 194 lb (88 kg; 13 st 12 lb)
- Position: Centre
- Shot: Left
- KHL team Former teams: HC Vityaz; Metallurg Novokuznetsk; Avangard Omsk; HC Spartak Moscow; HC MVD; HC Dynamo Moscow; Torpedo Nizhny Novgorod; Avtomobilist Yekaterinburg; Atlant Moscow Oblast; Salavat Yulaev Ufa; HC Neftekhimik Nizhnekamsk
- NHL draft: 162nd overall, 2000; Dallas Stars
- Playing career: 1998–2020

Artyom Sergeyevich Chernov (Russian: Артём Сергеевич Чернов; 28 April 1982 – 11 December 2020) was a Russian professional ice hockey centre who played for HC Vityaz of the Kontinental Hockey League (KHL). He was drafted 162nd overall by the Dallas Stars in the 2000 NHL entry draft.

Chernov made his Kontinental Hockey League debut playing with HC Dynamo Moscow during the 2010–11 KHL season.

He died on 11 December 2020 at the age of 38. His cause of death was reported to be relating to existing heart issues. He had supposedly been in treatment for drug problems.

== Career statistics ==
=== Regular season and playoffs ===
			Regular season					Playoffs
Season	Team	League	GP	G	A	Pts	PIM	GP	G	A	Pts	PIM
1997–98	Metallurg–2 Novokuznetsk	RUS.3	4	0	0	0	0	—	—	—	—	—
1998–99	Metallurg–2 Novokuznetsk	RUS.3	32	9	7	16	14	—	—	—	—	—
1999–2000	Metallurg Novokuznetsk	RSL	10	2	3	5	0	5	0	0	0	0
1999–2000	Metallurg–2 Novokuznetsk	RUS.3	9	7	4	11	16	—	—	—	—	—
2000–01	Metallurg Novokuznetsk	RSL	44	15	17	32	30	—	—	—	—	—
2000–01	Metallurg–2 Novokuznetsk	RUS.3	6	6	5	11	6	—	—	—	—	—
2001–02	Avangard Omsk	RSL	44	6	5	11	4	—	—	—	—	—
2001–02	Avangard–VDV Omsk	RUS.3	2	3	4	7	4	—	—	—	—	—
2002–03	Avangard Omsk	RSL	47	9	10	19	6	12	1	1	2	4
2003–04	Omskie Yastreby	RUS.3	10	4	4	8	28	—	—	—	—	—
2004–05	Spartak Moscow	RSL	6	0	0	0	2	—	—	—	—	—
2004–05	Yunost Minsk	BLR	20	8	9	17	16	12	3	5	8	4
2004–05	Yunior Minsk	BLR.2	9	10	6	16	4	—	—	—	—	—
2005–06	Yunost Minsk	BLR	52	23	25	48	34	11	4	13	17	10
2005–06	Yunior Minsk	BLR.2	1	0	2	2	0	—	—	—	—	—
2006–07	HC MVD	RSL	50	16	16	32	56	3	0	0	0	4
2006–07	Yunost Minsk	BLR	—	—	—	—	—	1	0	0	0	0
2007–08	HC MVD	RSL	44	12	14	26	28	3	1	0	1	0
2010–11	Dynamo Moscow	KHL	17	2	6	8	2	4	0	1	1	2
2010–11	Dynamo Tver	VHL	34	14	11	25	64	—	—	—	—	—
2011–12	Dynamo Moscow	KHL	36	6	7	13	14	1	1	0	1	0
2012–13	Torpedo Nizhny Novgorod	KHL	35	3	7	10	10	—	—	—	—	—
2013–14	Avtomobilist Yekaterinburg	KHL	53	11	13	24	16	4	3	1	4	2
2014–15	Atlant Moscow Oblast	KHL	60	16	18	34	26	—	—	—	—	—
2015–16	Salavat Yulaev Ufa	KHL	37	4	3	7	16	3	0	0	0	0
2016–17	Salavat Yulaev Ufa	KHL	15	1	1	2	2	—	—	—	—	—
2016–17	Toros Neftekamsk	VHL	1	0	2	2	0	—	—	—	—	—
2016–17	Neftekhimik Nizhnekamsk	KHL	5	0	0	0	0	—	—	—	—	—
2016–17	HC Vityaz	KHL	26	0	6	6	14	4	0	1	1	0
2017–18	Metallurg Novokuznetsk	VHL	48	17	14	31	24	12	4	4	8	4
2018–19	Toros Neftekamsk	VHL	47	18	18	36	14	15	2	4	6	2
2019–20	Metallurg Novokuznetsk	VHL	46	8	14	22	16	—	—	—	—	—
RSL totals			245	60	65	125	126	23	2	1	3	8
KHL totals			284	43	61	104	100	16	4	3	7	4
VHL totals			176	57	59	116	118	27	6	8	14	6

=== International ===
Year	Team	Event	GP	G	A	Pts	PIM
2000	Russia	WJC18	6	2	2	4	2
2001	Russia	WJC	7	1	0	1	0
Junior totals			13	3	2	5	2
