= Tomáš Harant =

Slovak ice hockey player

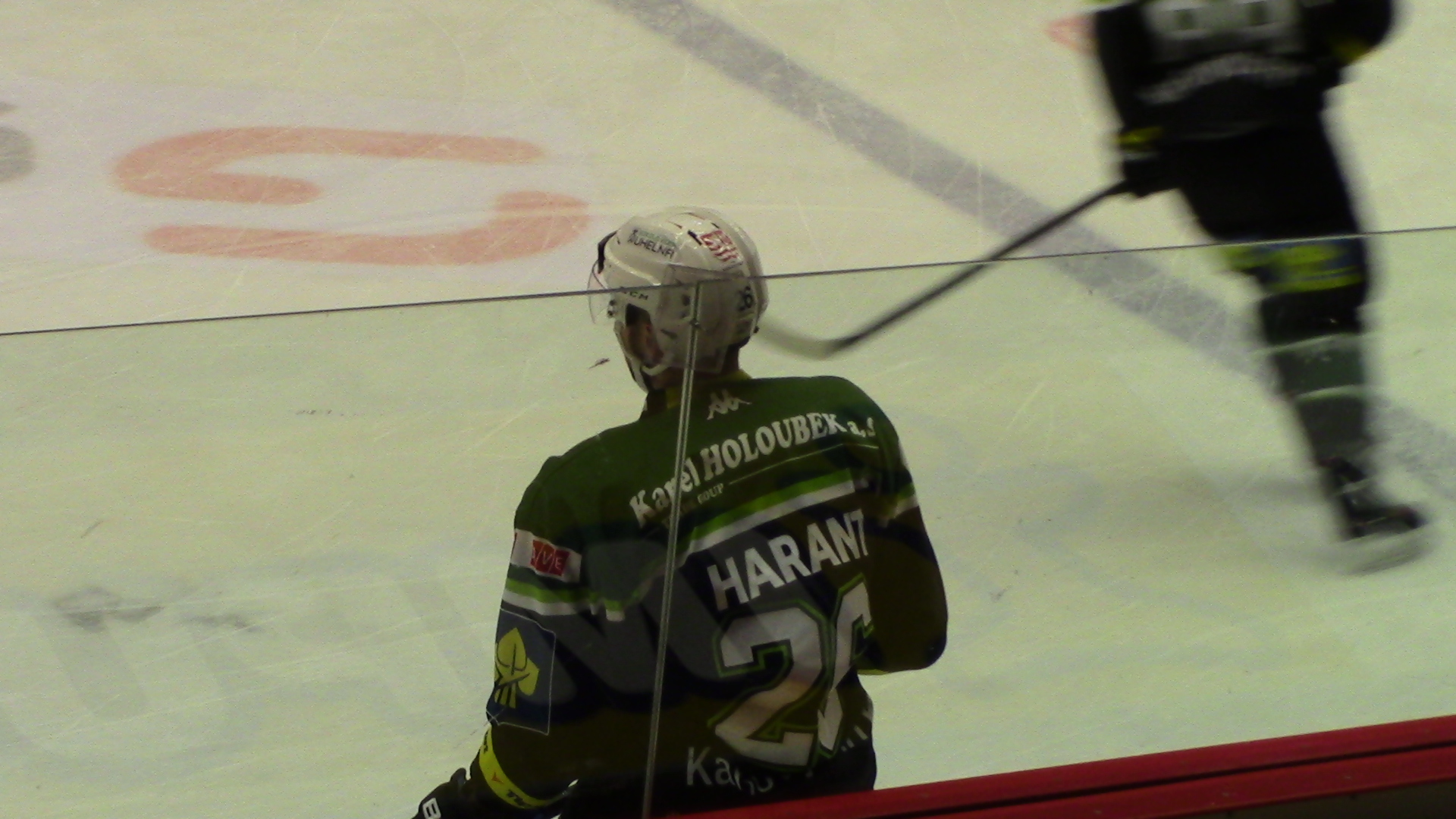
- Harant in 2015
- Born: April 28, 1980 (age 46) Žilina, Czechoslovakia
- Height: 6 ft 2 in (188 cm)
- Weight: 209 lb (95 kg; 14 st 13 lb)
- Position: Defense
- Shot: Left
- Played for: MsHK Žilina; HC Oceláři Třinec; AZ Havířov; HC Dynamo Moscow; HC Karlovy Vary; Motor České Budějovice; Lowell Devils; Mora IK; HC Bílí Tygři Liberec; Mountfield HK; Piráti Chomutov
- National team: Slovakia
- NHL draft: 173rd overall, 2000; Nashville Predators
- Playing career: 1997–2018

Tomáš Harant (born April 28, 1980) is a Slovak ice hockey coach and former professional ice hockey player who is an assistant coach for Vlci Žilina of the Slovak Extraliga. He last played for MsHK Zilina in the Slovak Extraliga. Harant was drafted in the sixth-round of the 2000 NHL entry draft, 173rd overall by the Nashville Predators.

Harant made his Czech Extraliga debut playing with HC Oceláři Třinec during the 2000-01 Czech Extraliga season.

== Career statistics ==
=== Regular season and playoffs ===
			Regular season					Playoffs
Season	Team	League	GP	G	A	Pts	PIM	GP	G	A	Pts	PIM
1995–96	MsHK Žilina	SVK U18	46	3	9	12	142	—	—	—	—	—
1996–97	MsHK Žilina	SVK U18	44	1	4	5	18	—	—	—	—	—
1997–98	MsHK Žilina	SVK U20	41	5	7	12	72	—	—	—	—	—
1997–98	MsHK Žilina	SVK.2	5	0	0	0	0	—	—	—	—	—
1998–99	MsHK Žilina	SVK U20	33	1	6	7	108	—	—	—	—	—
1999–2000	MsHK Žilina	SVK U20	31	1	9	10	60	—	—	—	—	—
1999–2000	MsHK Žilina	SVK.2	27	0	3	3	34	—	—	—	—	—
2000–01	HC Oceláři Třinec	CZE U20	6	1	2	3	12	—	—	—	—	—
2000–01	HC Oceláři Třinec	ELH	15	1	2	3	14	—	—	—	—	—
2001–02	MsHK Žilina	SVK	51	2	3	5	46	4	0	0	0	4
2002–03	HC Havířov Panthers	ELH	19	0	1	1	38	—	—	—	—	—
2002–03	MsHK Žilina	SVK	28	2	3	5	86	4	1	0	1	24
2003–04	Dynamo Moscow	RSL	31	1	0	1	18	3	0	0	0	0
2003–04	Dynamo–2 Moscow	RUS.3	4	0	2	2	4	—	—	—	—	—
2004–05	Dynamo Moscow	RSL	1	0	0	0	2	—	—	—	—	—
2004–05	Dynamo–2 Moscow	RUS.3	2	0	1	1	0	—	—	—	—	—
2004–05	HC Energie Karlovy Vary	ELH	37	1	5	6	57	—	—	—	—	—
2005–06	HC České Budějovice	ELH	45	2	7	9	90	10	4	2	6	40
2006–07	Lowell Devils	AHL	54	1	23	24	36	—	—	—	—	—
2007–08	Mora IK	SEL	53	3	5	8	64	—	—	—	—	—
2008–09	Bílí Tygři Liberec	ELH	24	1	3	4	44	1	0	0	0	0
2008–09	HC Benátky nad Jizerou	CZE.2	3	0	0	0	0	—	—	—	—	—
2011–12	MsHK DOXXbet Žilina	SVK	9	1	0	1	16	5	1	0	1	2
2012–13	MsHK DOXXbet Žilina	SVK	29	1	10	11	36	—	—	—	—	—
2012–13	HC Mountfield	ELH	12	0	3	3	10	5	0	0	0	0
2013–14	Mountfield HK	ELH	49	1	3	4	50	6	0	1	1	20
2014–15	HC Energie Karlovy Vary	ELH	49	3	16	19	54	—	—	—	—	—
2015–16	HC Energie Karlovy Vary	ELH	17	0	0	0	24	—	—	—	—	—
2015–16	Piráti Chomutov	ELH	23	1	3	4	12	3	0	0	0	2
2016–17	HC Energie Karlovy Vary	ELH	48	4	8	12	40	—	—	—	—	—
2017–18	MsHK DOXXbet Žilina	SVK	28	2	3	5	14	—	—	—	—	—
ELH totals			338	14	51	65	433	25	4	3	7	62
SVK totals			145	8	19	27	198	13	2	0	2	30

=== International ===
Year	Team	Event	GP	G	A	Pts	PIM
2006	Slovakia	WC	7	0	0	0	4
2007	Slovakia	WC	7	0	0	0	0
Senior totals			14	0	0	0	4
