= Tero Määttä =

Finnish ice hockey player

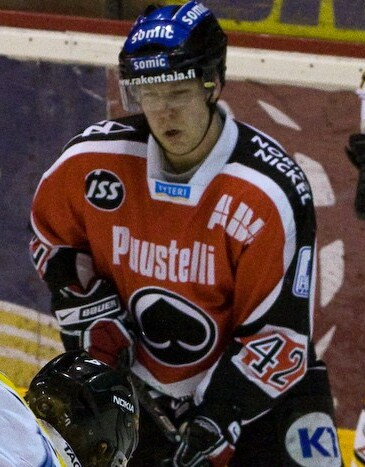
- Born: January 2, 1982 (age 44) Vantaa, Finland
- Height: 6 ft 2 in (188 cm)
- Weight: 238 lb (108 kg; 17 st 0 lb)
- Position: Defence
- Shot: Left
- Played for: Blues; Ässät; Mora IK
- NHL draft: 41st overall, 2000; San Jose Sharks
- Playing career: 2000–2011

Tero Määttä (born January 2, 1982) is a Finnish ice hockey defenceman who last played for Ässät of the SM-liiga. Although selected by the San Jose Sharks in the 2000 NHL entry draft, he never appeared in an NHL game.

== Career statistics ==
=== Regular season and playoffs ===
			Regular season					Playoffs
Season	Team	League	GP	G	A	Pts	PIM	GP	G	A	Pts	PIM
1997–98	Jokerit	FIN U18	28	4	7	11	10	2	0	0	0	2
1998–99	Jokerit	FIN U18	26	4	8	12	59	7	1	3	4	6
1998–99	Jokerit	FIN U20	12	0	0	0	16	1	0	0	0	0
1999–2000	Jokerit	FIN U20	31	4	4	8	53	11	1	3	4	6
2000–01	Blues	FIN U20	6	0	1	1	6	—	—	—	—	—
2000–01	Blues	SM-liiga	44	4	4	8	24	—	—	—	—	—
2000–01	KJT	Mestis	6	0	3	3	31	—	—	—	—	—
2001–02	Blues	FIN U20	8	2	6	8	2	—	—	—	—	—
2001–02	Blues	SM-liiga	54	4	6	10	65	3	0	0	0	0
2002–03	Blues	SM-liiga	50	0	3	3	85	7	0	1	1	4
2002–03	Ässät	FIN U20	1	0	1	1	0	—	—	—	—	—
2002–03	Ässät	SM-liiga	7	0	0	0	29	—	—	—	—	—
2003–04	Blues	SM-liiga	56	1	14	15	41	9	0	1	1	8
2004–05	Blues	SM-liiga	56	2	11	13	40	—	—	—	—	—
2005–06	Blues	SM-liiga	54	5	6	11	83	9	0	0	0	0
2006–07	Mora IK	SEL	52	3	5	8	56	4	0	0	0	2
2007–08	Mora IK	SEL	53	6	5	11	65	—	—	—	—	—
2008–09	Ässät	SM-liiga	57	3	9	12	68	—	—	—	—	—
2009–10	Ässät	SM-liiga	57	2	12	14	98	—	—	—	—	—
2010–11	Ässät	SM-liiga	20	0	1	1	30	6	0	0	0	4
2010–11	SaPKo	Mestis	6	1	0	1	2	—	—	—	—	—
SM-liiga totals			452	21	66	87	563	34	0	2	2	16
SEL totals			105	9	10	19	121	4	0	0	0	2

=== International ===
Year	Team	Event	GP	G	A	Pts	PIM
2000	Finland	WJC18	7	2	2	4	8
2001	Finland	WJC	4	0	0	0	2
2002	Finland	WJC	7	1	2	3	4
Junior totals			18	3	4	7	14
