= Alexander Drozdetsky =

Russian ice hockey player (born 1981)

- Born: November 10, 1981 (age 44) Moscow, Soviet Union
- Height: 6 ft 0 in (183 cm)
- Weight: 180 lb (82 kg; 12 st 12 lb)
- Position: Right wing
- Shot: Left
- Played for: Borås HC; SKA Saint Petersburg; CSKA Moscow; Ak Bars Kazan; HC Neftekhimik Nizhnekamsk; Avangard Omsk; HC Spartak Moscow; Severstal Cherepovets; Avtomobilist Yekaterinburg
- National team: Russia
- NHL draft: 94th overall, 2000; Philadelphia Flyers
- Playing career: 1999–2012

Alexander Nikolaiyevich Drozdetsky also known as Aleksandr Drozdetsky (Russian: Александр Николаевич Дроздецкий; born 10 November 1981), is a Russian former professional ice hockey player. He played 14 seasons primarily in the Russian Superleague (RSL) and Kontinental Hockey League (KHL). He is the son of Nikolay Drozdetsky.

== Playing career ==
Drozdetsky was selected by the Philadelphia Flyers in the 3rd round (94th overall) of the 2000 NHL entry draft. Inge Hammarström, the Flyers' chief European scout at the time and who had in previous drafts successfully lobbied for the Flyers to select Peter Forsberg, Mikael Renberg, Dmitri Yushkevich, and Janne Niinimaa, likened Drozdetsky to a young Igor Larionov and predicted he would be playing for the Flyers within two years.

== Career statistics ==
			Regular season					Playoffs
Season	Team	League	GP	G	A	Pts	PIM	GP	G	A	Pts	PIM
1996–97	SKA–2 Saint Petersburg	RUS.3	1	0	0	0	0	—	—	—	—	—
1997–98	SKA–2 Saint Petersburg	RUS.3	6	0	0	0	0	—	—	—	—	—
1998–99	SKA–2 Saint Petersburg	RUS.3	24	5	3	8	12	—	—	—	—	—
1999–2000	SKA Saint Petersburg	RSL	31	2	0	2	8	4	0	0	0	0
1999–2000	SKA–2 Saint Petersburg	RUS.3	4	4	1	5	2	—	—	—	—	—
2000–01	SKA Saint Petersburg	RSL	42	6	7	13	74	—	—	—	—	—
2000–01	SKA–2 Saint Petersburg	RUS.3	—	—	—	—	—	3	0	1	1	4
2001–02	CSKA Moscow	RSL	49	11	6	17	26	—	—	—	—	—
2002–03	CSKA Moscow	RSL	46	14	13	27	30	—	—	—	—	—
2003–04	Ak Bars Kazan	RSL	57	16	15	31	62	1	0	0	0	2
2004–05	Ak Bars Kazan	RSL	32	3	4	7	28	—	—	—	—	—
2004–05	Ak Bars–2 Kazan	RUS.3	7	10	8	18	16	—	—	—	—	—
2004–05	Neftekhimik Nizhnekamsk	RSL	7	5	1	6	4	—	—	—	—	—
2005–06	Avangard Omsk	RSL	30	6	6	12	26	—	—	—	—	—
2005–06	SKA Saint Petersburg	RSL	16	4	10	14	6	3	0	0	0	0
2006–07	SKA Saint Petersburg	RSL	45	11	15	26	66	3	0	2	2	0
2007–08	SKA–2 Saint Petersburg	RUS.3	12	9	9	18	6	—	—	—	—	—
2007–08	Spartak Moscow	RSL	32	11	6	17	40	5	4	3	7	2
2008–09	Spartak Moscow	KHL	47	13	13	26	38	6	1	3	4	2
2009–10	Severstal Cherepovets	KHL	11	1	0	1	4	—	—	—	—	—
2009–10	Neftekhimik Nizhnekamsk	KHL	26	4	7	11	14	9	0	1	1	4
2010–11	Neftekhimik Nizhnekamsk	KHL	6	0	0	0	4	—	—	—	—	—
2011–12	Avtomobilist Yekaterinburg	KHL	18	1	2	3	6	—	—	—	—	—
RSL totals			387	89	83	172	370	16	4	5	9	4
KHL totals			108	19	22	41	66	15	1	4	5	6
