= Marek Posmyk =

Czech professional ice hockey defenceman (born 1978)

- Born: September 15, 1978 (age 47) Jihlava, Czechoslovakia
- Height: 6 ft 5 in (196 cm)
- Weight: 228 lb (103 kg; 16 st 4 lb)
- Position: Defence
- Shot: Right
- Played for: Tampa Bay Lightning; HC České Budějovice
- NHL draft: 36th overall, 1996; Toronto Maple Leafs
- Playing career: 1995–2014

Marek Posmyk (born September 15, 1978) is a Czech former professional ice hockey defenceman who last played for HC České Budějovice of the Czech Extraliga. He was drafted in the second round, 36th overall, of the 1996 NHL entry draft by the Toronto Maple Leafs. He was traded by the Maple Leafs to the Tampa Bay Lightning on February 9, 2000, as part of the deal which brought Darcy Tucker to Toronto.

Posmyk played nineteen games in the National Hockey League with the Lightning: eighteen in the 1999–2000 season and one more in the 2000–01 season. He scored one goal and two assists for Tampa Bay.

== Career statistics ==
=== Regular season and playoffs ===
			Regular season					Playoffs
Season	Team	League	GP	G	A	Pts	PIM	GP	G	A	Pts	PIM
1995–96	HC Dukla Jihlava	CZE	19	1	3	4	18	2	0	0	0	0
1996–97	HC Dukla Jihlava	CZE	24	1	7	8	6	—	—	—	—	—
1996–97	St. John's Maple Leafs	AHL	2	0	0	0	2	—	—	—	—	—
1997–98	Sarnia Sting	OHL	48	8	16	24	94	5	0	2	2	6
1997–98	St. John's Maple Leafs	AHL	3	0	0	0	4	—	—	—	—	—
1998–99	St. John's Maple Leafs	AHL	41	1	0	1	36	—	—	—	—	—
1999–00	St. John's Maple Leafs	AHL	38	1	6	7	57	—	—	—	—	—
1999–00	Detroit Vipers	IHL	1	0	1	1	0	—	—	—	—	—
1999–00	Tampa Bay Lightning	NHL	18	1	2	3	20	—	—	—	—	—
2000–01	Detroit Vipers	IHL	49	7	14	21	58	—	—	—	—	—
2000–01	Tampa Bay Lightning	NHL	1	0	0	0	0	—	—	—	—	—
2001–02	Aukro Berani Zlín	CZE	45	8	6	14	147	6	0	0	0	10
2002–03	HC Slavia Praha	CZE	41	0	4	4	20	17	4	3	7	34
2003–04	HC Plzeň	CZE	10	0	1	1	14	—	—	—	—	—
2003–04	Nuermberg Ice Tigers	DEL	25	2	4	6	24	6	1	2	3	6
2004–05	EHC Black Wings Linz	EBEL	34	7	4	11	68	—	—	—	—	—
2005–06	Motor České Budějovice	CZE	42	11	12	23	72	10	2	3	5	10
2006–07	Motor České Budějovice	CZE	38	8	4	12	67	11	1	0	1	10
2007–08	HC Dynamo Pardubice	CZE	37	3	1	4	30	—	—	—	—	—
2007–08	HC Plzeň	CZE	5	1	0	1	4	4	0	0	0	18
2008–09	BK Mladá Boleslav	CZE	33	3	4	7	18	—	—	—	—	—
2008–09	Motor České Budějovice	CZE	2	0	0	0	4	—	—	—	—	—
2010–11	Lausitzer Füchse	DEL2	4	0	1	1	20	—	—	—	—	—
2010–11	SG Cortina	Italy-A	25	5	18	23	34	—	—	—	—	—
2011–12	HC Kladno	CZE	16	4	1	5	34	—	—	—	—	—
2012–13	HC Litvínov	CZE	42	3	7	10	74	7	1	0	1	4
2013–14	HC Litvínov	CZE	34	2	4	6	78	—	—	—	—	—
NHL totals			19	1	2	3	20	—	—	—	—	—
