= Martin Höhener =

Swiss ice hockey player

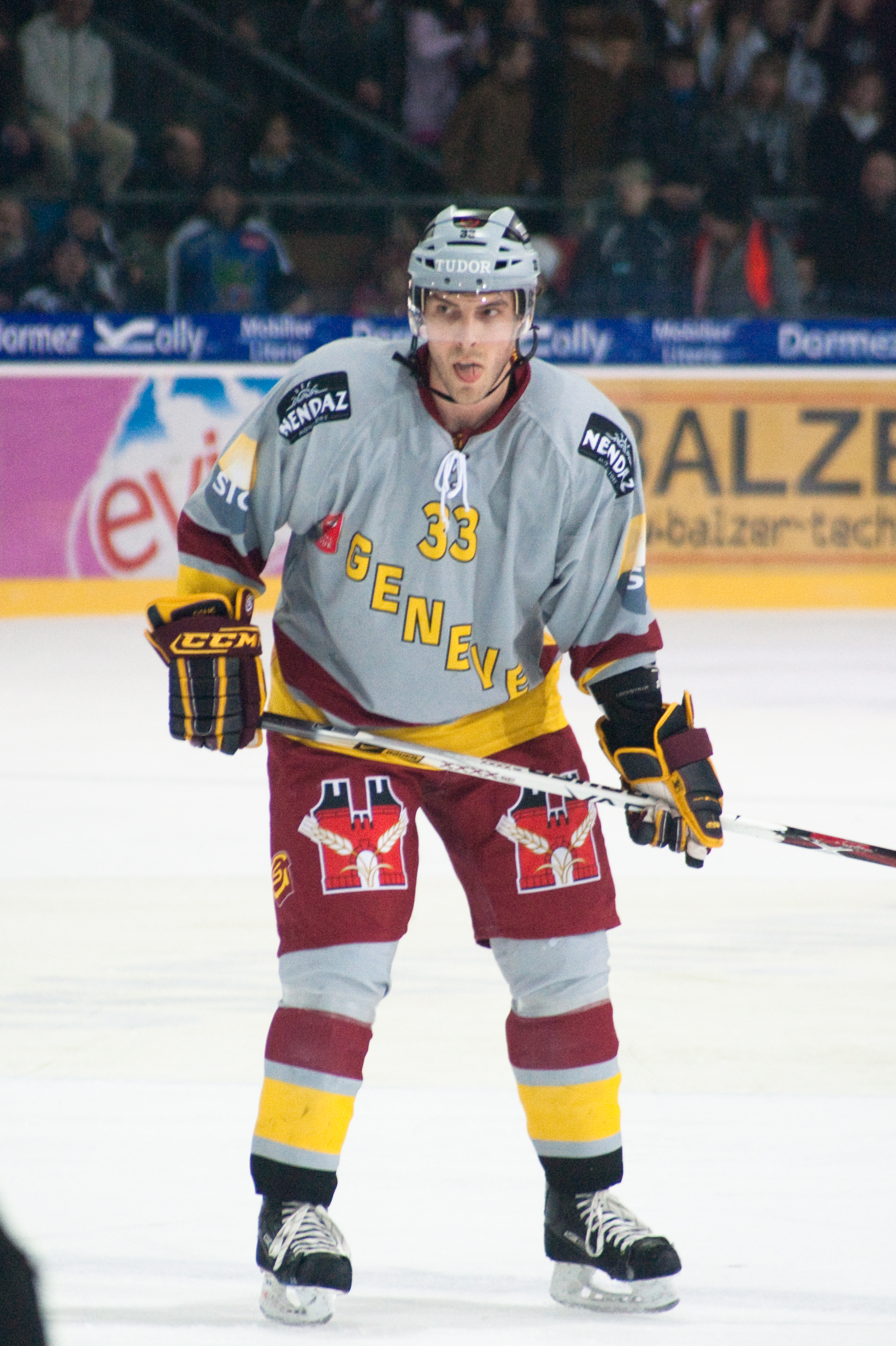
- Born: June 23, 1980 (age 45) Zürich, Switzerland
- Height: 6 ft 1 in (185 cm)
- Weight: 192 lb (87 kg; 13 st 10 lb)
- Position: Defence
- Shot: Left
- Played for: NLA; Kloten Flyers; Genève-Servette HC; ZSC Lions; HC Ambrì-Piotta; SC Bern; NLB; HC Thurgau; GCK Lions; EHC Bülach; EHC Basel
- National team: Switzerland
- NHL draft: 284th overall, 2000; Nashville Predators
- Playing career: 1998–2013

Martin Höhener (born June 23, 1980) is a Swiss former professional ice hockey defenceman. He was selected by the Nashville Predators in the 9th round (284th overall) of the 2000 NHL entry draft.

In 2002, he played for the Switzerland national ice hockey team in the Olympic Games in Salt Lake City, Utah.

== Career statistics ==
=== Regular season and playoffs ===
			Regular season					Playoffs
Season	Team	League	GP	G	A	Pts	PIM	GP	G	A	Pts	PIM
1996–97	EHC Kloten	SUI U20	37	4	7	11	24	—	—	—	—	—
1997–98	EHC Kloten	SUI U20	25	2	9	11	31	—	—	—	—	—
1997–98	EHC Bülach	SUI.2	4	0	0	0	0	—	—	—	—	—
1998–99	EHC Kloten	SUI U20	21	5	8	13	22	2	1	0	1	2
1998–99	EHC Kloten	NDA	20	0	1	1	2	9	0	1	1	0
1999–2000	EHC Kloten	NLA	44	4	2	6	20	5	0	1	1	2
1999–2000	EHC Kloten	SUI U20	—	—	—	—	—	2	1	0	1	0
2000–01	Kloten Flyers	NLA	35	4	5	9	32	9	0	1	1	0
2000–01	HC Thurgau	SUI.2	1	0	0	0	0	—	—	—	—	—
2001–02	Kloten Flyers	NLA	44	4	11	15	12	9	0	1	1	2
2002–03	Kloten Flyers	NLA	30	0	2	2	8	3	0	0	0	4
2003–04	Genève–Servette HC	NLA	30	7	12	19	16	12	0	3	3	8
2004–05	ZSC Lions	NLA	27	1	1	2	30	15	0	0	0	12
2005–06	ZSC Lions	NLA	22	0	1	1	22	—	—	—	—	—
2005–06	GCK Lions	SUI.2	10	4	7	11	8	—	—	—	—	—
2005–06	HC Ambrì–Piotta	NLA	11	0	1	1	14	7	1	3	4	14
2006–07	HC Ambrì–Piotta	NLA	42	2	7	9	97	—	—	—	—	—
2007–08	Genève–Servette HC	NLA	46	9	17	26	50	16	3	0	3	4
2008–09	Genève–Servette HC	NLA	21	4	4	8	14	—	—	—	—	—
2009–10	Genève–Servette HC	NLA	47	5	9	14	45	20	0	3	3	12
2010–11	Genève–Servette HC	NLA	31	0	6	6	16	6	0	0	0	2
2011–12	SC Bern	NLA	43	2	3	5	24	17	0	1	1	2
2012–13	SC Bern	NLA	4	0	0	0	6	—	—	—	—	—
2012–13	HC Ambrì–Piotta	NLA	4	0	0	0	4	—	—	—	—	—
2012–13	EHC Basel	SUI.2	6	0	1	1	2	—	—	—	—	—
NDA/NLA totals			501	42	82	124	412	128	4	14	18	62

=== International ===
Year	Team	Event	GP	G	A	Pts	PIM
1998	Switzerland	EJC	6	0	0	0	10
2000	Switzerland	WJC	7	0	1	1	4
2002	Switzerland	OG	4	0	0	0	0
2002	Switzerland	WC	5	0	0	0	2
Junior totals			13	0	1	1	14
Senior totals			9	0	0	0	2
