= 2000–01 NHL transactions =

This list is for 2000–01 NHL transactions within professional ice hockey league of players in North America. The following contains team-to-team transactions that occurred in the National Hockey League during the 2000–01 NHL season. It lists what team each player has been traded to, or claimed by, and for which players or draft picks, if applicable.

== May ==
Date			References
May 1, 2000	To Los Angeles Kings Steve Passmore	To Chicago Blackhawks Chicago's option of a 4th-rd pick – 2000 entry draft (# 117 – Olli Malmivaara) or 4th-rd pick – 2001 entry draft	
May 11, 2000	To Columbus Blue Jackets Chris Nielsen	To New York Islanders 4th-rd pick – 2000 entry draft (ANA – # 98 – Jonas Ronnqvist)^{1} 9th-rd pick – 2000 entry draft (# 264 – Dimitri Altaryov)	
May 23, 2000	To Mighty Ducks of Anaheim 4th-rd pick – 2000 entry draft (# 98 – Jonas Ronnqvist)	To New York Islanders Trent Hunter	
May 25, 2000	To Mighty Ducks of Anaheim 4th-rd pick – 2001 entry draft (# 105 – Vladimir Korsunov)	To Columbus Blue Jackets Espen Knutsen	
May 31, 2000	To Carolina Hurricanes 8th-rd pick – 2002 entry draft (TBL – # 256 – Darren Reid)^{2}	To Philadelphia Flyers Paul Ranheim	

1. The Islanders' acquired fourth-round pick went Anaheim as the result of a trade on May 23, 2000, that sent Trent Hunter to the Islanders in exchange for this pick.
2. Carolina's acquired eighth-round pick went to Tampa Bay as the result of a trade on June 23, 2002, that sent a fourth-round pick in the 2003 entry draft to Carolina in exchange for a sixth, eighth (# 255 overall), ninth-round picks in the 2002 entry draft and this pick.

== June ==
Date			References
June 1, 2000	To Tampa Bay Lightning 7th-rd pick – 2000 entry draft (# 222 – Marek Priechodsky)	To Florida Panthers rights to Eric Beaudoin	
June 1, 2000	To Mighty Ducks of Anaheim 4th-rd pick – 2000 entry draft (PIT – # 124 – Michel Ouellet)^{1}	To Washington Capitals rights to Stephen Peat	
June 2, 2000	To Montreal Canadiens future considerations^{2}	To Atlanta Thrashers 6th-rd pick – 2000 entry draft (# 180 – Darcy Hordichuk)	
June 2, 2000	To Montreal Canadiens Kevin Hodson	To Tampa Bay Lightning 7th-rd pick – 2000 entry draft (PHI – # 210 – John Eichelberger)^{3}	
June 4, 2000	To Tampa Bay Lightning 7th-rd pick – 2000 entry draft (BUF – # 220 – Paul Gaustad)^{4}	To Ottawa Senators Rich Parent	
June 7, 2000	To Columbus Blue Jackets Marc Denis	To Colorado Avalanche 2nd-rd pick – 2000 entry draft (CAR – # 32 – Tomas Kurka)^{5}	
June 10, 2000	To Mighty Ducks of Anaheim Jean-Sebastien Giguere	To Calgary Flames 2nd-rd pick – 2000 entry draft (WAS – # 43 – Matt Pettinger)^{6}	
June 11, 2000	To San Jose Sharks 8th-rd pick – 2001 entry draft (CGY – # 233 – Joe Campbell)^{7} future considerations^{8}	To Minnesota Wild Andy Sutton; 7th-rd pick – 2000 entry draft (# 214 – Peter Bartos); 3rd-rd pick – 2001 entry draft (CBJ – # 85 – Aaron Johnson)^{9}	
June 11, 2000	To San Jose Sharks future considerations^{10}	To Columbus Blue Jackets Jan Caloun; 9th-rd pick – 2000 entry draft (# 278 – Martin Paroulek) conditional pick – 2001 entry draft^{11}	
June 12, 2000	To Dallas Stars 3rd-rd pick – 2000 entry draft (# 68 – Joel Lundqvist); 4th-rd pick – 2002 entry draft (LAK – # 104 – Aaron Rome)^{12}	To Minnesota Wild Manny Fernandez; Brad Lukowich	
June 12, 2000	To New Jersey Devils Steve Staios	To Atlanta Thrashers 9th-rd pick – 2000 entry draft (# 290 – Simon Gamache)	
June 12, 2000	To Mighty Ducks of Anaheim Patrick Traverse	To Ottawa Senators Joel Kwiatkowski	
June 12, 2000	To Edmonton Oilers Patrick Cote	To Nashville Predators 5th-rd pick – 2000 entry draft (# 154 – Matt Koalska)	
June 12, 2000	To New Jersey Devils Ed Ward	To Mighty Ducks of Anaheim 7th-rd pick – 2001 entry draft (# 224 – Tony Martensson)	
June 12, 2000	To Chicago Blackhawks 9th-rd pick – 2000 entry draft (# 291 – Arne Ramholt)	To Philadelphia Flyers Mark Janssens	
June 12, 2000	To New Jersey Devils 3rd-rd pick – 2001 entry draft (# 72 – Brandon Nolan) future considerations (Turner Stevenson)^{13}	To Columbus Blue Jackets Krzysztof Oliwa future considerations (Deron Quint)^{13}	
June 23, 2000	To Phoenix Coyotes Joe Juneau	To Minnesota Wild rights to Rickard Wallin	
June 23, 2000	To New Jersey Devils Chris Terreri; 9th-rd pick – 2000 entry draft (TBL – # 263 – Thomas Ziegler)^{14}	To Minnesota Wild Brad Bombardir	
June 23, 2000	To Minnesota Wild rights to Dan Cavanaugh; Minnesota's option of an 8th-rd pick – 2000 entry draft or 8th-rd pick – 2001 entry draft (# 239 – Jake Riddle)	To Calgary Flames Mike Vernon	
June 23, 2000	To Buffalo Sabres future considerations^{15}	To Columbus Blue Jackets Matt Davidson; Jean-Luc Grand-Pierre; 5th-rd pick – 2000 entry draft (# 150 – Tyler Kolarik); 5th-rd pick – 2001 entry draft (DET – # 157 – Andreas Jamtin)^{16}	
June 23, 2000	To Montreal Canadiens future considerations^{17}	To Columbus Blue Jackets 2nd-rd pick – 2001 entry draft (# 53 – Kiel McLeod)	
June 23, 2000	To Boston Bruins future considerations	To Columbus Blue Jackets 5th-rd pick – 2000 entry draft (# 138 – Scott Heffernan)	
June 24, 2000	To Tampa Bay Lightning Kevin Weekes rights to Kristian Kudroc; 2nd-rd pick – 2001 entry draft (PHO – # 31 – Matthew Spiller)^{18}	To New York Islanders 1st-rd pick – 2000 entry draft (# 5 – Raffi Torres); 4th-rd pick – 2000 entry draft (# 105 – Vladimir Gorbunov); 7th-rd pick – 2000 entry draft (# 202 – Ryan Caldwell)	
June 24, 2000	To Colorado Avalanche Nolan Pratt; 1st-rd pick – 2000 entry draft (# 14 – Václav Nedorost); 2nd-rd pick – 2000 entry draft (# 47 – Jared Aulin); 2nd-rd pick – 2000 entry draft (# 63 – Agris Saviels)	To Carolina Hurricanes Sandis Ozolinsh; 2nd-rd pick – 2000 entry draft (# 32 – Tomas Kurka)	
June 24, 2000	To Edmonton Oilers Eric Brewer; Josh Green; 2nd-rd pick – 2000 entry draft (# 35 – Brad Winchester)	To New York Islanders Roman Hamrlik	
June 24, 2000	To Detroit Red Wings 2nd-rd pick – 2000 entry draft (# 38 – Tomas Kopecky)	To New York Rangers 2nd-rd pick – 2000 entry draft (# 64 – Filip Novak); 3rd-rd pick – 2000 entry draft (# 95 – Dominic Moore)	
June 24, 2000	To San Jose Sharks 2nd-rd pick – 2000 entry draft (# 41 – Tero Maatta)	To Chicago Blackhawks 2nd-rd pick – 2000 entry draft (# 49 – Jonas Nordquist); 3rd-rd pick – 2000 entry draft (# 74 – Igor Radulov)	
June 24, 2000	To Vancouver Canucks 2nd-rd pick – 2001 entry draft (NAS – # 33 – Timofei Shishkanov)^{19} 3rd-rd pick – 2001 entry draft (# 66 – Fedor Fedorov)	To Atlanta Thrashers 2nd-rd pick – 2000 entry draft (# 42 – Libor Ustrnul); 3rd-rd pick – 2001 entry draft (# 80 – Michael Garnett)	
June 24, 2000	To Calgary Flames Miika Elomo; 4th-rd pick – 2000 entry draft (# 116 – Levente Szuper)	To Washington Capitals 2nd-rd pick – 2000 entry draft (# 43 – Matt Pettinger)	
June 24, 2000	To Montreal Canadiens 3rd-rd pick – 2000 entry draft (# 78 – Jozef Balej); 4th-rd pick – 2000 entry draft (PIT – # 124 – Michel Ouellet)^{20} 5th-rd pick – 2000 entry draft (# 145 – Ryan Glenn)	To Mighty Ducks of Anaheim 2nd-rd pick – 2000 entry draft (# 44 – Ilya Bryzgalov)	
June 24, 2000	To Carolina Hurricanes 4th-rd pick – 2000 entry draft (# 97 – Niclas Wallin)	To Atlanta Thrashers 4th-rd pick – 2000 entry draft (# 108 – Blake Robson); 5th-rd pick – 2000 entry draft (# 147 – Matthew McRae); 8th-rd pick – 2000 entry draft (# 244 – Eric Bowen)	
June 24, 2000	To Nashville Predators 7th-rd pick – 2000 entry draft (PHI – # 95 – Patrick Sharp)^{21}	To Detroit Red Wings 4th-rd pick – 2000 entry draft (# 102 – Stefan Liv)	
June 24, 2000	To Montreal Canadiens 4th-rd pick – 2000 entry draft (# 114 – Christian Larrivee)	To Pittsburgh Penguins 4th-rd pick – 2000 entry draft (# 124 – Michel Ouellet); 5th-rd pick – 2000 entry draft (# 146 – David Koci)	
June 24, 2000	To Chicago Blackhawks 9th-rd pick – 2000 entry draft (# 262 – Peter Flache)	To Atlanta Thrashers rights to Ben Simon	
June 24, 2000	To Florida Panthers Olli Jokinen; Roberto Luongo	To New York Islanders Oleg Kvasha; Mark Parrish	
June 24, 2000	To Phoenix Coyotes Brad May	To Vancouver Canucks conditional pick – 2001 entry draft^{22}	
June 25, 2000	To San Jose Sharks 4th-rd pick – 2000 entry draft (# 104 – Jon DiSalvatore)	To New York Rangers 4th-rd pick – 2000 entry draft (# 112 – Premsyl Duben); 5th-rd pick – 2000 entry draft (# 143 – Brandon Snee)	
June 25, 2000	To Los Angeles Kings 4th-rd pick – 2000 entry draft (# 118 – Lubomir Visnovsky)	To Ottawa Senators 5th-rd pick – 2000 entry draft (# 156 – Greg Zanon); 5th-rd pick – 2000 entry draft (# 157 – Grant Potulny)	
June 25, 2000	To Tampa Bay Lightning 4th-rd pick – 2000 entry draft (# 126 – Johan Hagglund)	To Philadelphia Flyers 6th-rd pick – 2000 entry draft (# 171 – Roman Cechmanek); 7th-rd pick – 2000 entry draft (# 210 – John Eichelberger); 9th-rd pick – 2000 entry draft (# 287 – Milan Kopecky)	
June 25, 2000	To Los Angeles Kings 7th-rd pick – 2000 entry draft (# 201 – Yevgeny Fyodorov); 7th-rd pick – 2000 entry draft (# 206 – Tim Eriksson)	To Washington Capitals 5th-rd pick – 2000 entry draft (# 151 – Alexander Barkunov)	
June 25, 2000	To Chicago Blackhawks 5th-rd pick – 2000 entry draft (# 151 – Alexander Barkunov); 6th-rd pick – 2000 entry draft (# 193 – Joey Martin)	To Washington Capitals 4th-rd pick – 2000 entry draft (# 121 – Ryan Van Buskirk)	
June 25, 2000	To Toronto Maple Leafs 6th-rd pick – 2000 entry draft (# 179 – Vadim Sozinov); 7th-rd pick – 2000 entry draft (# 209 – Markus Seikola)	To Mighty Ducks of Anaheim rights to Jonathan Hedstrom	
June 25, 2000	To Buffalo Sabres 5th-rd pick – 2001 entry draft (SJS – # 140 – Tomas Plihal)^{23}	To Montreal Canadiens 6th-rd pick – 2000 entry draft (# 182 – Petr Chvojka)	
June 25, 2000	To Buffalo Sabres 7th-rd pick – 2000 entry draft (# 220 – Paul Gaustad)	To Tampa Bay Lightning 7th-rd pick – 2001 entry draft (OTT – # 218 – Jan Platil)^{24} 9th-rd pick – 2001 entry draft (# 281 – Ilya Solaryov)	
June 25, 2000	To Detroit Red Wings 8th-rd pick – 2000 entry draft (# 251 – Todd Jackson)	To Ottawa Senators Shane Hnidy	
June 25, 2000	To Dallas Stars Brad Lukowich; 3rd-rd pick – 2001 entry draft (# 70 – Yared Hagos); 9th-rd pick – 2001 entry draft (# 265 – Dale Sullivan)	To Minnesota Wild Aaron Gavey; Pavel Patera; 8th-rd pick – 2000 entry draft (# 255 – Eric Johansson); 4th-rd pick – 2002 entry draft (LAK – # 104 – Aaron Rome)^{25}	
June 25, 2000	To San Jose Sharks 8th-rd pick – 2000 entry draft (# 256 – Pasi Saarinen)	To Washington Capitals 8th-rd pick – 2001 entry draft (# 249 – Matthew Maglione)	
June 25, 2000	To Buffalo Sabres 8th-rd pick – 2000 entry draft (# 258 – Sean McMorrow)	To Calgary Flames 8th-rd pick – 2001 entry draft (# 251 – Ville Hamalainen)	
June 25, 2000	To New Jersey Devils 8th-rd pick – 2001 entry draft (# 229 – Aaron Voros)	To Tampa Bay Lightning 9th-rd pick – 2000 entry draft (# 263 – Thomas Ziegler)	
June 25, 2000	To Boston Bruins 9th-rd pick – 2000 entry draft (# 279 – Andreas Lindstrom)	To Edmonton Oilers 9th-rd pick – 2001 entry draft (# 272 – Ales Pisa)	
June 25, 2000	To Columbus Blue Jackets 9th-rd pick – 2000 entry draft (# 286 – Andrej Nedorost)	To Florida Panthers 9th-rd pick – 2001 entry draft (# 267 – Ivan Majesky)	
June 25, 2000	To Detroit Red Wings 9th-rd pick – 2002 entry draft (# 262 – Christian Soderstrom)	To Columbus Blue Jackets 9th-rd pick – 2000 entry draft (# 292 – Louis Mandeville)	
June 25, 2000	To Philadelphia Flyers 4th-rd pick – 2001 entry draft (NAS – # 98 – Jordin Tootoo)^{26}	To New York Islanders John Vanbiesbrouck	

1. Montreal's acquired fourth-round pick went to with Pittsburgh as the result of a trade on June 24, 2000, that sent a fourth-round pick in the 2000 entry draft to Montreal in exchange for a fifth-round pick in the 2000 entry draft and this pick.
  Montreal previously acquired this pick as the result of a trade on June 24, 2000, that sent a second-round pick in the 2000 entry draft to Anaheim in exchange for a third-round and fifth-round picks in the 2000 entry draft along with this pick.
2. Montreal's sixth-round pick went to Atlanta on June 2, 2000, to complete an agreement that Atlanta selects Brett Clark in the 1999 NHL expansion draft in exchange for this pick.
3. Tampa Bay's acquired seventh-round pick went to Philadelphia as the result of a trade on June 25, 2000, that sent a fourth-round pick in the 2000 Entry Draft to Tampa Bay in exchange for a sixth-round and ninth-round picks in the 2000 Entry Draft along with this pick.
4. Tampa Bay's acquired seventh-round pick went to Buffalo as the result of a trade on June 25, 2000, that sent a seventh-round and ninth-round picks in the 20001 entry draft to Tampa Bay in exchange for this pick.
5. Colorado's acquired second-round pick went to with Carolina as the result of a trade on June 24, 2000, that sent Nolan Pratt, a first-round and two second-round picks in the 2000 Entry Draft to Colorado in exchange for Sandis Ozolinsh and this pick.
6. Calgary's acquired second-round pick went to Washington as the result of a trade on June 24, 2000, that sent Miika Elomo and a fourth-round pick in the 2000 Entry Draft to Calgary in exchange for this pick.
7. San Jose's acquired eighth-round pick went to Calgary as the result of a trade on March 6, 2001, that sent Bill Lindsay to San Jose in exchange for this pick.
8. San Jose's protection of Evgeni Nabokov in 2000 NHL expansion draft.
9. Pittsburgh's third-round pick went to Columbus as the result of a trade on January 14, 2001, that sent Krzysztof Oliwa to Pittsburgh in exchange for this pick.
  Pittsburgh previously acquired this pick as the result of a trade on January 14, 2001, that sent Jiri Slegr to Atlanta in exchange for this pick.
  Atlanta previously acquired this pick as the result of a trade on September 29, 2000, that sent Matt Johnson to Minnesota in exchange for this pick.
10. San Jose's protection of Evgeni Nabokov in 2000 NHL expansion draft.
11. Conditions of this draft pick are unknown. Columbus made no pick selection belonging to San Jose in the 2001 entry draft.
12. Minnesota's re-acquired fourth-round pick went to Los Angeles as the result of a trade on June 22, 2002, that sent Cliff Ronning to Minnesota in exchange for this pick.
  Dallas fourth-round pick was re-acquired as the result of a trade on June 25, 2000, that sent Brad Lukowich, a third-round and ninth-round picks in the 2001 entry draft to Minnesota in exchange for Aaron Gavey, Pavel Patera, an eighth-round pick in the 2000 entry draft and this pick.
13. Trade completed on June 23, 2000.
14. New Jersey's acquired ninth-round pick went to Tampa Bay as the result of a trade on June 25, 2000, that sent an eighth-round pick in the 2001 entry draft to New Jersey in exchange for this pick.
15. Future considerations were to complete an agreement on June 23, 2000, that Columbus selects Geoff Sanderson and Dwayne Roloson in the 2000 NHL expansion draft in exchange for Matt Davidson, Jean-Luc Grand-Pierre, a fifth-round pick 2001 entry draft and 2001 entry draft.
16. Calgary's previously acquired fifth-round pick went to Detroit as the result of a trade on June 18, 1998, that sent a fifth-round pick (# 164 overall) and a seventh-round pick in the 2001 Entry Draft to Calgary in exchange for this pick.
  Calgary previously acquired this pick as the result of a trade on June 24, 2001, that sent the rights to Paul Manning to Columbus in exchange this pick.
17. Montreal's second-round pick in the 2001 entry draft went to Columbus on June 23, 2000, to complete an agreement that Columbus selects Frederic Chabot in the 2000 NHL expansion draft in exchange for this pick.
18. Tampa Bay's acquired second-round pick went to Phoenix as the result of a trade on March 5, 2001, that sent Stanislav Neckar and the rights to Nikolai Khabibulin to Tampa Bay in exchange for Mike Johnson, Paul Mara, Ruslan Zainullin and this pick.
19. Vancouver's acquired second-round pick went to Nashville as the result of a trade on March 9, 2001, that sent Drake Berehowsky to Vancouver in exchange for this pick.
20. Montreal's acquired fourth-round pick went to with Pittsburgh as the result of a trade on June 24, 2000, that sent a fourth-round pick in the 2000 Entry Draft to Montreal in exchange for a fifth-round pick in the 2000 Entry Draft and this pick.
21. Nashville's third-round pick went to Philadelphia as the result of a trade on September 29, 2000, that sent Mark Eaton to Nashville in exchange for this pick.
22. Conditions of this draft pick are unknown. Vancouver made no pick selection belonging to Phoenix in the 2001 entry draft.
23. Buffalo's acquired fifth-round pick went to San Jose as the result of a trade on June 24, 2001, that sent fifth, eighth and a nine-round picks in the 2001 entry draft to Buffalo in exchange for this pick.
24. Tampa Bay's acquired seventh-round pick went to Ottawa as the result of a trade on June 23, 2001, that sent a third-round pick in the 2001 entry draft to Tampa Bay in exchange for a fourth-round pick in the 2001 entry draft and this pick.
25. Minnesota's fourth-round pick went to Los Angeles as the result of a trade on June 22, 2002, that sent Cliff Ronning to Minnesota in exchange for this pick.
26. Philadelphia's acquired fourth-round pick went to Nashville as the result of a trade on June 23, 2001, that sent fourth, fifth and seventh-round picks in the 2001 entry draft to Philadelphia in exchange for this pick.

== July ==
Date			References
July 10, 2000	To New Jersey Devils future considerations	To Atlanta Thrashers Steve Staios	
July 20, 2000	To Boston Bruins Kay Whitmore	To Edmonton Oilers future considerations	
July 20, 2000	To Chicago Blackhawks Nolan Baumgartner	To Washington Capitals Remi Royer	

== August ==
Date			References
August 4, 2000	To Carolina Hurricanes Rob DiMaio; Darren Langdon	To New York Rangers Sandy McCarthy; 4th-rd pick – 2001 entry draft (# 113 – Bryce Lampman)	
August 11, 2000	To Dallas Stars David Ling	To Chicago Blackhawks future considerations	
August 17, 2000	To Detroit Red Wings 6th-rd pick – 2003 entry draft (# 170 – Andreas Sundin)	To Columbus Blue Jackets Kent McDonell	

== September ==
Date			References
September 25, 2000	To Nashville Predators Alexei Vasiliev	To New York Rangers conditional pick – 2001 entry draft^{1}	
September 26, 2000	To Mighty Ducks of Anaheim Andrei Nazarov; 2nd-rd pick – 2001 entry draft (CGY – # 41 – Andrei Taratukhin)^{2}	To Calgary Flames rights to Jordan Leopold	
September 26, 2000	To Toronto Maple Leafs rights to Regan Kelly	To Philadelphia Flyers Chris McAllister	
September 29, 2000	To Minnesota Wild Matt Johnson	To Atlanta Thrashers 3rd-rd pick – 2001 entry draft (CBJ – # 85 – Aaron Johnson)^{3}	
September 29, 2000	To Nashville Predators Mark Eaton	To Philadelphia Flyers 3rd-rd pick – 2001 entry draft (# 95 – Patrick Sharp)	

1. Conditions of this draft pick are unknown and no pick was taken by the Rangers.
2. Calgary's second-round pick was re-acquired as the result of a trade with Phoenix on June 23, 2001, that sent a first-round pick in the 2001 entry draft (# 11 overall) to Phoenix in exchange for a first-round pick in the 2001 entry draft (# 14 overall) and this pick.
  Phoenix previously acquired this pick as the result of a trade on June 19, 2001, that sent Keith Carney to Anaheim in exchange for this pick.
3. Pittsburgh's third-round pick went to Columbus as the result of a trade on January 14, 2001, that sent Krzysztof Oliwa to Pittsburgh in exchange for this pick.
  Pittsburgh previously acquired this pick as the result of a trade on January 14, 2001, that sent Jiri Slegr to Atlanta in exchange for this pick.

== October ==
Date			References
October 2, 2000	To Toronto Maple Leafs Bryan McCabe	To Chicago Blackhawks Alexander Karpovtsev; 4th-rd pick – 2001 entry draft (# 115 – Vladimir Gusev)	
October 5, 2000	To Chicago Blackhawks future considerations	To New York Rangers Brad Brown; Michal Grosek	
October 29, 2000	To Toronto Maple Leafs future considerations	To Dallas Stars Gerald Diduck	

== November ==
Date			References
November 6, 2000	To New Jersey Devils Geordie Kinnear	To Atlanta Thrashers future considerations	
November 6, 2000	To Chicago Blackhawks Jaroslav Spacek	To Florida Panthers Anders Eriksson	
November 9, 2000	To Columbus Blue Jackets Jean-Francois Labbe	To New York Rangers Bert Robertsson	
November 10, 2000	To Boston Bruins Bill Guerin; Oilers' option to swap 1st-rd picks – 2001 entry draft (# 19 – Shaone Morrisonn) or 2002 entry draft	To Edmonton Oilers Anson Carter; Oilers' option to swap 1st-rd picks – 2001 entry draft (# 13 – Ales Hemsky) or 2002 entry draft 2nd-rd pick – 2001 entry draft (# 43 – Doug Lynch)	
November 14, 2000	To Pittsburgh Penguins Dan Trebil	To New York Islanders 9th-rd pick – 2001 entry draft (# 280 – Roman Kukhtinov)	
November 18, 2000	To Boston Bruins Andrei Nazarov; Patrick Traverse	To Mighty Ducks of Anaheim Samuel Pahlsson	
November 29, 2000	To St. Louis Blues Mike Peluso	To Washington Capitals Derek Bekar	

== December ==
Date			References
December 5, 2000	To Boston Bruins future considerations	To New York Islanders Sean Pronger	
December 7, 2000	To Montreal Canadiens Gino Odjick	To Philadelphia Flyers P.J. Stock; 6th-rd pick – 2001 entry draft (# 172 – Dennis Seidenberg)	
December 11, 2000	To Toronto Maple Leafs 3rd-rd pick – 2001 entry draft (# 65 – Brendan Bell)	To Washington Capitals Dmitri Khristich	
December 17, 2000	To St. Louis Blues Eric Boguniecki	To Florida Panthers Andrej Podkonicky	
December 18, 2000	To Montreal Canadiens Chad Kilger	To Edmonton Oilers Sergei Zholtok	
December 28, 2000	To Detroit Red Wings Igor Larionov	To Florida Panthers Yan Golubovsky	
December 28, 2000	To Colorado Avalanche 5th-rd pick – 2001 entry draft (# 143 – Frantisek Skladany)	To New York Rangers Alexei Gusarov	
December 28, 2000	To St. Louis Blues Dan Trebil	To Pittsburgh Penguins Marc Bergevin	
December 28, 2000	To Vancouver Canucks Mike Stapleton	To New York Islanders 9th-rd pick – 2001 entry draft (WAS – # 275 – Robert Muller)^{1}	

1. The Islanders' acquired ninth-round pick went to Washington as the result of a trade on January 11, 2001, that sent Craig Berube to the Islanders in exchange for this pick.

== January ==
Date			References
January 3, 2001	To Tampa Bay Lightning future considerations	To New York Islanders Steve Martins	
January 3, 2001	To Los Angeles Kings 5th-rd pick – 2002 entry draft (# 157 – Joel Andresen)	To New York Islanders Jason Blake	
January 11, 2001	To Washington Capitals 9th-rd pick – 2001 entry draft (# 275 – Robert Muller)	To New York Islanders Craig Berube	
January 12, 2001	To Edmonton Oilers Rory Fitzpatrick	To Nashville Predators future considerations	
January 13, 2001	To Minnesota Wild Roman Simicek	To Pittsburgh Penguins Steve McKenna	
January 14, 2001	To Atlanta Thrashers Jiri Slegr	To Pittsburgh Penguins 3rd-rd pick – 2001 entry draft (CBJ – # 85 – Aaron Johnson)^{1}	
January 14, 2001	To Columbus Blue Jackets 3rd-rd pick – 2001 entry draft (# 85 – Aaron Johnson)	To Pittsburgh Penguins Krzysztof Oliwa	
January 14, 2001	To Pittsburgh Penguins Kevin Stevens	To Philadelphia Flyers John Slaney	
January 20, 2001	To Florida Panthers Vaclav Prospal	To Ottawa Senators Senators' option of 4th-rd pick – 2001 entry draft or 3rd-rd pick – 2002 entry draft^{2}	
January 21, 2001	To Colorado Avalanche Bryan Muir	To Tampa Bay Lightning 8th-rd pick – 2001 entry draft (# 259 – Dmitri Bezrukov)	

1. Pittsburgh's third-round pick went to Columbus as the result of a trade on January 14, 2001, that sent Krzysztof Oliwa to Pittsburgh in exchange for this pick.
2. Conditions of the pick are unknown. The conditional pick was returned to Florida as the result of a trade on March 13, 2001, that sent Mike Sillinger to Ottawa in exchange for this pick.

== February ==
Date			References
February 1, 2001	To Nashville Predators future considerations	To Washington Capitals Brantt Myhres	
February 1, 2001	To Tampa Bay Lightning Matthew Barnaby	To Pittsburgh Penguins Wayne Primeau	
February 5, 2001	To Dallas Stars John MacLean	To New York Rangers future considerations	
February 7, 2001	To Vancouver Canucks Dan Cloutier	To Tampa Bay Lightning Adrian Aucoin; 2nd-rd pick – 2001 entry draft (# 47 – Alexander Polushin)	
February 9, 2001	To Mighty Ducks of Anaheim Scott Langkow; Sergei Vyshedkevich	To Atlanta Thrashers Ladislav Kohn	
February 9, 2001	To St. Louis Blues Scott Mellanby	To Florida Panthers David Morisset; 5th-rd pick – 2002 entry draft (# 158 – Vince Bellissimo)	
February 13, 2001	To Boston Bruins 9th-rd pick – 2001 entry draft (# 282 – Marcel Rodman)	To Philadelphia Flyers rights to Matt Zultek	
February 15, 2001	To Los Angeles Kings Felix Potvin	To Vancouver Canucks 3rd-rd pick – 2002 entry draft (# 83 – Lukas Mensator)	
February 16, 2001	To Tampa Bay Lightning Wade Flaherty	To New York Islanders conditional pick – 2002 entry draft^{1}	
February 20, 2001	To Toronto Maple Leafs Maxim Galanov	To Tampa Bay Lightning Konstantin Kalmikov	
February 21, 2001	To Los Angeles Kings Adam Deadmarsh; Aaron Miller; 1st-rd pick – 2001 entry draft (# 30 – David Steckel); 1st-rd pick – 2003 entry draft (# 26 – Brian Boyle) future considerations (Jared Aulin)^{2}	To Colorado Avalanche Rob Blake; Steven Reinprecht	
February 21, 2001	To Boston Bruins Eric Weinrich	To Montreal Canadiens Patrick Traverse	
February 23, 2001	To New Jersey Devils Bob Corkum	To Los Angeles Kings future considerations (Steve Kelly)^{3}	
February 28, 2001	To Los Angeles Kings 8th-rd pick – 2001 entry draft (# 237 – Mike Gabinet)	To Chicago Blackhawks Steve Passmore	

1. Conditions of this draft pick are unknown. The Islanders made no pick selection belonging to Tampa Bay in the 2002 entry draft.
2. Trade completed on March 22, 2001.
3. Trade completed on February 27, 2001.

== March ==
- Trading Deadline: March 13, 2001

Date			References
March 1, 2001	To Minnesota Wild Askhat Rakhmatullin; 3rd-rd pick – 2001 entry draft (NYR – # 79 – Garth Murray)^{1} conditional pick – 2002 entry draft (5th-rd – # 155 – Armands Berzins)^{2}	To Carolina Hurricanes Scott Pellerin	
March 1, 2001	To New York Rangers Colin Forbes	To Ottawa Senators Eric Lacroix	
March 3, 2001	To Colorado Avalanche Brent Thompson	To Florida Panthers future considerations	
March 3, 2001	To Washington Capitals David Emma	To Florida Panthers Remi Royer	
March 4, 2001	To New Jersey Devils Sean O'Donnell	To Minnesota Wild Willie Mitchell	
March 5, 2001	To San Jose Sharks Teemu Selanne	To Mighty Ducks of Anaheim Jeff Friesen; Steve Shields; 2nd-rd pick – 2003 entry draft (DAL – # 36 – Vojtech Polak)^{3}	
March 5, 2001	To St. Louis Blues Alexei Gusarov	To New York Rangers Peter Smrek	
March 5, 2001	To Phoenix Coyotes Mike Johnson; Paul Mara; Ruslan Zainullin; 2nd-rd pick – 2001 entry draft (# 31 – Matthew Spiller)	To Tampa Bay Lightning Stanislav Neckar rights to Nikolai Khabibulin	
March 6, 2001	To San Jose Sharks Bill Lindsay	To Calgary Flames 8th-rd pick – 2001 entry draft (# 233 – Joe Campbell)	
March 7, 2001	To Nashville Predators Bert Robertsson	To New York Rangers Ryan Tobler	
March 9, 2001	To Vancouver Canucks Drake Berehowsky	To Nashville Predators 2nd-rd pick – 2001 entry draft (# 33 – Timofei Shishkanov)	
March 12, 2001	To San Jose Sharks Jeff Norton	To Pittsburgh Penguins Bobby Dollas; Johan Hedberg	
March 12, 2001	To New Jersey Devils John Vanbiesbrouck	To New York Islanders Chris Terreri; 9th-rd pick – 2001 entry draft (# 287 – Juha-Pekka Ketola)	
March 13, 2001	To Minnesota Wild 3rd-rd pick – 2001 entry draft (# 93 – Stephane Veilleux) conditional pick – 2002 entry draft^{4}	To Ottawa Senators Curtis Leschyshyn	
March 13, 2001	To Buffalo Sabres Donald Audette	To Atlanta Thrashers Kamil Piros; 4th-rd pick – 2001 entry draft (STL – # 122 – Igor Valeev)^{5}	
March 13, 2001	To Dallas Stars Grant Ledyard	To Tampa Bay Lightning 7th-rd pick – 2001 entry draft (# 222 – Jeremy Van Hoof)	
March 13, 2001	To Tampa Bay Lightning John Emmons	To Ottawa Senators Craig Millar	
March 13, 2001	To Florida Panthers return of the Senators' option of 4th-rd pick – 2001 entry draft or 3rd-rd pick – 2002 entry draft^{6}	To Ottawa Senators Mike Sillinger	
March 13, 2001	To Buffalo Sabres Steve Heinze	To Columbus Blue Jackets 3rd-rd pick – 2001 entry draft (# 87 – Per Mars)	
March 13, 2001	To Columbus Blue Jackets 6th-rd pick – 2001 entry draft (# 187 – Artem Vostrikov)	To Pittsburgh Penguins Frantisek Kucera	
March 13, 2001	To Edmonton Oilers Sven Butenschon	To Pittsburgh Penguins Dan LaCouture	
March 13, 2001	To Columbus Blue Jackets Ray Whitney future considerations	To Florida Panthers Kevyn Adams conditional pick – 2001 entry draft (4th-rd – # 117 – Michael Woodford)^{7} or 2002 entry draft	
March 13, 2001	To Phoenix Coyotes Todd Simpson	To Florida Panthers 2nd-rd pick – 2001 entry draft (NJD – # 44 – Igor Pohanka)^{8}	
March 13, 2001	To Mighty Ducks of Anaheim Alexei Tezikov; 4th-rd pick – 2001 entry draft (# 118 – Brandon Rogers)	To Washington Capitals Jason Marshall	
March 13, 2001	To Toronto Maple Leafs Aki Berg	To Los Angeles Kings Adam Mair; 2nd-rd pick – 2001 entry draft (# 49 – Michael Cammalleri)	
March 13, 2001	To Chicago Blackhawks 3rd-rd pick – 2001 entry draft (TOR – # 88 – Nicolas Corbeil)^{9}	To Philadelphia Flyers Dean McAmmond	
March 13, 2001	To Washington Capitals Dean Melanson	To Philadelphia Flyers Matt Herr	
March 13, 2001	To Calgary Flames Craig Conroy; 7th-rd pick – 2001 entry draft (# 220 – David Moss)	To St. Louis Blues Cory Stillman	
March 13, 2001	To Phoenix Coyotes Michal Handzus; Ladislav Nagy rights to Jeff Taffe; 1st-rd pick – 2001 entry draft or 2002 entry draft (2002 – # 23 – Ben Eager)^{10}	To St. Louis Blues Keith Tkachuk	
March 13, 2001	To Montreal Canadiens Jan Bulis; Richard Zednik; 1st-rd pick – 2001 entry draft (# 25 – Alexander Perezhogin)	To Washington Capitals Trevor Linden; Dainius Zubrus; 2nd-rd pick – 2001 entry draft (TBL – # 61 – Andreas Holmqvist)^{11}	

1. Minnesota's acquired third-round pick went to the Rangers as the result of a trade on June 23, 2001, that sent a third-round pick in the 2001 Entry Draft (# 74 overall) to Minnesota in exchange for a fifth-round pick in the 2001 Entry Draft and this pick.
2. Conditions of this draft pick are unknown.
3. Anaheim's acquired second-round pick went to Dallas as the result of a trade on June 21, 2003, that sent a first-round pick in the 2003 entry draft to Anaheim in exchange for a second-round pick in the 2003 entry draft and this pick.
4. Conditions of this draft pick are unknown. Ottawa made no pick selection belonging to Minnesota in the 2002 entry draft.
5. Atlanta's acquired fourth-round pick went to St. Louis as the result of a trade on June 23, 2001, that sent Lubos Bartecko to Atlanta in exchange for this pick.
6. Conditions of the pick are unknown. The original trade was on January 20, 2001, that sent Vaclav Prospal to Florida in exchange for this pick.
7. Conditions of the pick are unknown.
8. Florida's acquired second-round pick went to New Jersey as the result of a trade on June 23, 2001, that sent a first-round pick in the 2001 entry draft to Florida in exchange for a second-round pick (# 48 overall) in the 2001 entry draft and this pick.
9. Chicago's acquired third-round pick went to Toronto as the result of a trade on June 23, 2001, that sent Igor Korolev to Chicago in exchange for this pick.
10. The first-round pick option became a first-round pick in the 2002 entry draft after St. Louis lost its first-round pick in the 2001 entry draft to New Jersey as penalty for Scott Stevens tampering.
11. Washington's acquired second-round pick went to Tampa Bay as the result of a trade on June 23, 2001, that sent a second-round pick in the 2002 entry draft to Washington in exchange for this pick.

== See also ==
- 2000 NHL entry draft
- 2000 in sports
- 2001 in sports
