= Stanislav Neckář =

Czech ice hockey player

- Born: 22 December 1975 (age 50) České Budějovice, Czechoslovakia
- Height: 6 ft 1 in (185 cm)
- Weight: 212 lb (96 kg; 15 st 2 lb)
- Position: Defence
- Shot: Left
- Played for: České Budějovice; Ottawa Senators; Detroit Vipers; New York Rangers; Phoenix Coyotes; Tampa Bay Lightning; Nashville Predators; Milwaukee Admirals; Södertälje SK
- National team: Czech Republic
- NHL draft: 29th overall, 1994; Ottawa Senators
- Playing career: 1992–2006

Stanislav "Stan" Neckář (Czech: [ˈstanɪslav ˈnɛtskaːr̝]; born 22 December 1975) is a former Czech professional ice hockey player. He played ten seasons in the National Hockey League (NHL) with the Ottawa Senators, New York Rangers, Phoenix Coyotes, Tampa Bay Lightning and the Nashville Predators. He then played two seasons in Europe before retiring, with České Budějovice, and Elitserien team Södertälje SK.

== Playing career ==
Neckář played junior hockey with České Budějovice in 1991–92 followed by two seasons with their pro team. He was chosen in the 1994 NHL entry draft by the Ottawa Senators and he signed with Ottawa in 1994. He played part of his first season with the Ottawa affiliate Detroit Vipers before being elevated to the Senators. He would then a further nine seasons in the NHL. He stayed with Ottawa until 1998 when he was traded to the Rangers. Before the season was over, he was traded to Phoenix. He played most of three seasons with the Coyotes before being traded to Tampa Bay in 2001. He played two seasons with the Lightning, signing with Nashville in 2003, before returning to the Lightning just before the season ended. He returned just in time to play two playoff games for the team en route to winning the Stanley Cup. It was his last season in the NHL.

In his entire NHL career, Neckář played a total of 510 regular season games, scoring 12 goals and assisting on 41 others for a total of 53 points. He also played 29 playoff games, scoring 3 assists for 3 points.

During the 2004–05 NHL lockout he played in his native Czech Republic, returning to České Budějovice. He played one further season with Södertälje SK in Sweden before retiring.

== Career statistics ==
=== Regular season and playoffs ===
			Regular season					Playoffs
Season	Team	League	GP	G	A	Pts	PIM	GP	G	A	Pts	PIM
1991–92	TJ Motor České Budějovice	TCH U20	18	1	3	4		—	—	—	—	—
1992–93	HC České Budějovice	TCH	42	2	9	11	12	—	—	—	—	—
1993–94	HC České Budějovice	ELH	12	3	1	4	4	3	0	0	0	0
1994–95	Detroit Vipers	IHL	15	2	2	4	15	—	—	—	—	—
1994–95	Ottawa Senators	NHL	48	1	3	4	37	—	—	—	—	—
1995–96	Ottawa Senators	NHL	82	3	9	12	54	—	—	—	—	—
1996–97	Ottawa Senators	NHL	5	0	0	0	2	—	—	—	—	—
1997–98	Ottawa Senators	NHL	60	2	2	4	31	9	0	0	0	2
1998–99	Ottawa Senators	NHL	3	0	2	2	0	—	—	—	—	—
1998–99	New York Rangers	NHL	18	0	0	0	8	—	—	—	—	—
1998–99	Phoenix Coyotes	NHL	11	0	1	1	10	6	0	1	1	4
1999–2000	Phoenix Coyotes	NHL	66	2	8	10	36	5	0	0	0	0
2000–01	Phoenix Coyotes	NHL	53	2	2	4	63	—	—	—	—	—
2000–01	Tampa Bay Lightning	NHL	16	0	2	2	8	—	—	—	—	—
2001–02	Tampa Bay Lightning	NHL	77	1	7	8	24	—	—	—	—	—
2002–03	Tampa Bay Lightning	NHL	70	1	4	5	43	7	0	2	2	2
2003–04	Nashville Predators	NHL	1	0	1	1	0	—	—	—	—	—
2003–04	Milwaukee Admirals	AHL	3	0	3	3	2	—	—	—	—	—
2003–04	Tampa Bay Lightning	NHL	—	—	—	—	—	2	0	0	0	0
2004–05	HC České Budějovice	ELH	16	2	6	8	8	11	0	0	0	12
2005–06	Södertälje SK	SEL	36	0	3	3	73	—	—	—	—	—
NHL totals			510	12	41	53	316	29	0	3	3	8

=== International ===
Year	Team	Event	GP	G	A	Pts	PIM
1993	Czechoslovakia	WJC	7	2	0	2	6
1996	Czech Republic	WC	8	1	3	4	2
1996	Czech Republic	WCH	3	0	0	0	0
Senior totals			11	1	3	4	2

== Transactions ==
- June 28, 1994 - Ottawa Senators second-round draft choice (29th overall) in the 1994 NHL entry draft.
- November 27, 1998 - Traded by the Ottawa Senators to the New York Rangers in exchange for Bill Berg and the Rangers second-round draft choice (Jordan Leopold) in the 1999 NHL entry draft.
- March 23, 1999 - Traded by the New York Rangers to the Phoenix Coyotes in exchange for Jason Doig and Phoenix's sixth-round draft choice (Jay Dardis) in the 1999 NHL Entry Draft.
- March 5, 2001 - Traded by the Phoenix Coyotes, along with Nikolai Khabibulin, to the Tampa Bay Lightning in exchange for Mike Johnson, Paul Mara, Ruslan Zainullin and the Islanders' second-round draft choice (Matthew Spiller) in the 2001 NHL entry draft.
- November 26, 2003 - Signed as a free agent with the Nashville Predators.
- March 9, 2004 - Traded by the Nashville Predators to the Tampa Bay Lightning in exchange for Tampa Bay's sixth-round draft choice (Kevin Schaeffer) in the 2004 NHL entry draft.
