= Darcy Hordichuk =

Canadian ice hockey player (born 1980)

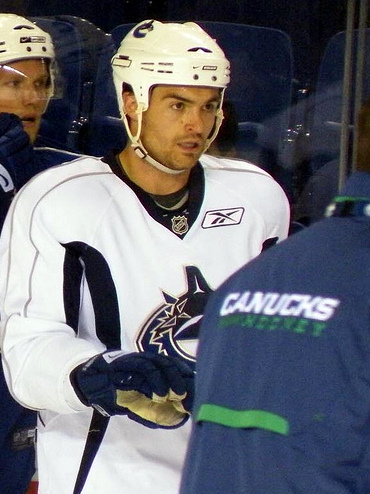
- Born: August 10, 1980 (age 45) Kamsack, Saskatchewan, Canada
- Height: 6 ft 1 in (185 cm)
- Weight: 212 lb (96 kg; 15 st 2 lb)
- Position: Left wing
- Shot: Left
- Played for: Atlanta Thrashers; Phoenix Coyotes; Florida Panthers; Nashville Predators; Vancouver Canucks; Edmonton Oilers
- NHL draft: 180th overall, 2000; Atlanta Thrashers
- Playing career: 2000–2013

Darcy Hordichuk (born August 10, 1980) is a Canadian former professional ice hockey winger. He has previously played for the Vancouver Canucks, Nashville Predators, Atlanta Thrashers, Phoenix Coyotes, Florida Panthers and Edmonton Oilers.

== Playing career ==
After playing midget hockey with the Yorkton Mallers of the SMHL, Hordichuk joined the Calgary Hitmen of the Western Hockey League (WHL) for 3 games in the 1996–97 season. The next year would see Hordichuk playing with the Dauphin Kings of the Manitoba Junior Hockey League (MJHL), a Junior 'A' league. In 58 games with the Kings, Hordichuk had 12 goals and 33 points, as well as 279 penalty minutes. He would spend the next two seasons in the WHL, playing with the Saskatoon Blades, where he had 515 penalty minutes in 129 games, including 73 fights.

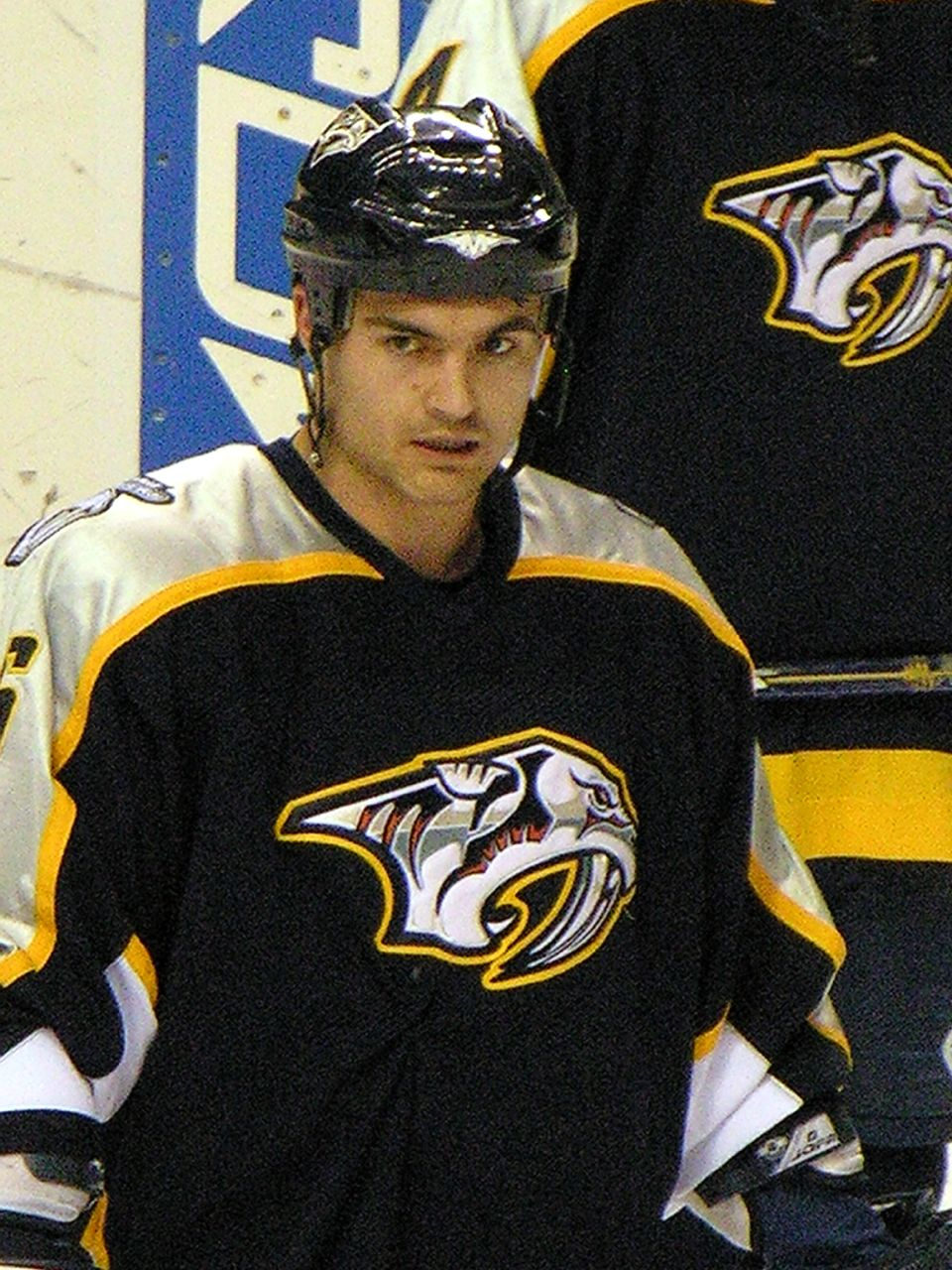
Hordichuk while a member of the Nashville Predators

At twenty-years-old, he was drafted in 2000 by the Atlanta Thrashers as the 180th overall pick in the sixth round. Hordichuk became well known in the NHL for his physical play and fighting. Upon being drafted, he was assigned to the Thrashers' minor league affiliate, the Orlando Solar Bears of the International Hockey League (IHL). He completed his first professional season also appearing in 11 games for the Thrashers as a call-up. He secured a roster spot with the club in his second year, but was dealt at the trade deadline to the Phoenix Coyotes along with a fifth-round draft pick in 2002 in exchange for prospects Kirill Safronov and Ruslan Zainullin. The following season, he was dealt to the Florida Panthers along with a second-round draft pick in exchange for defenceman Brad Ference. As he was swapped between teams in his first three seasons, Hordichuk played mostly in the minor leagues.

After the 2004–05 NHL lockout, Hordichuk joined the Nashville Predators and recorded career-highs with 7 goals, 6 assists and 13 points in his first season with the team. He re-signed with the club to a one-year contract on July 16, 2007. After his third season in Nashville, his rights were traded to the Carolina Hurricanes in exchange for a 2008 fifth-round draft pick on June 19, 2008, as he was set to become a free agent. He did not, however, come to terms with the Hurricanes and instead signed with the Vancouver Canucks on July 1. With Vancouver, Hordichuk scored his first NHL playoff goal in 2009, beating Nikolai Khabibulin in game four of the second round against the Chicago Blackhawks, a 2–1 loss for the Canucks.

Hordichuk was fined $2,500 by the NHL early in the 2009–10 season after checking Columbus Blue Jackets winger Jared Boll's head into the boards during a game on October 5, 2009. The following month, Hordichuk received an automatic one-game suspension for instigating a fight with St. Louis Blues forward Cam Janssen in the final five minutes of a game on November 10. Incidentally, he forfeited $4,015.54 in salary. On October 2, 2010, the Vancouver Canucks placed Hordichuk on waivers. Instead of sending him down to the minors, Vancouver traded him to the Florida Panthers for Andrew Peters. Canucks' GM Mike Gillis had previously pledged to try to find Hordichuk another NHL job.

He signed a one-year contract worth $825,000 with the Edmonton Oilers on July 1, 2011. During the 2011 off-season, Hordichuk vowed to abuse the Sedin twins the next time he played against the Canucks. When the Oilers and Canucks met on October 15, 2011, Hordichuk injured his knee taking a run at Canuck defenseman Keith Ballard, who threw a last-minute hip check at the charging Hordichuk after releasing an outlet pass.

As a free agent, Hordichuk was re-signed by the Edmonton Oilers to a one-year contract worth $850,000. During the lockout, Hordichuk did not sign with a different team, instead focusing his attention on training and improving his game.

On February 11, 2013, Hordichuk was placed on waivers by the Edmonton Oilers. The next day he cleared and was sent to the Oilers' AHL affiliate, the Oklahoma City Barons.

On August 19, 2013, it was reported by Finnish media outlet Ilta-Sanomat, that Hordichuk was offered a one-year deal worth approximately $270,000 (200,000 Euro) by Helsinki IFK of the Finnish Elite League (SM-Liiga), but the 12-year NHL veteran turned the deal down.

== Personal ==
Hordichuk spent summer 2008 training with Chuck Liddell, a mixed martial artist and former Ultimate Fighting Championship light heavyweight champion. Hordichuk used the training to improve on his skills in on-ice fighting.

Hordichuk and his wife Lisa are the parents of two sons.

== Career statistics ==
			Regular season					Playoffs
Season	Team	League	GP	G	A	Pts	PIM	GP	G	A	Pts	PIM
1996–97	Yorkton Mallers AAA	SMHL	37	5	12	17	148	9	1	0	1	26
1996–97	Calgary Hitmen	WHL	3	0	0	0	2	—	—	—	—	—
1997–98	Dauphin Kings	MJHL	58	12	21	33	279	—	—	—	—	—
1998–99	Saskatoon Blades	WHL	66	3	2	5	246	—	—	—	—	—
1999–00	Saskatoon Blades	WHL	63	6	8	14	269	11	4	2	6	43
2000–01	Atlanta Thrashers	NHL	11	0	0	0	38	—	—	—	—	—
2000–01	Orlando Solar Bears	IHL	69	7	3	10	369	16	3	3	6	41
2001–02	Atlanta Thrashers	NHL	33	1	1	2	127	—	—	—	—	—
2001–02	Chicago Wolves	AHL	34	5	4	9	127	—	—	—	—	—
2001–02	Phoenix Coyotes	NHL	1	0	0	0	14	—	—	—	—	—
2002–03	Phoenix Coyotes	NHL	25	0	0	0	82	—	—	—	—	—
2002–03	Springfield Falcons	AHL	22	1	3	4	38	—	—	—	—	—
2002–03	Florida Panthers	NHL	3	0	0	0	15	—	—	—	—	—
2003–04	Florida Panthers	NHL	57	3	1	4	158	—	—	—	—	—
2005–06	Nashville Predators	NHL	74	7	6	13	163	—	—	—	—	—
2006–07	Nashville Predators	NHL	53	1	3	4	90	2	0	0	0	0
2007–08	Nashville Predators	NHL	45	1	2	3	60	5	0	0	0	2
2008–09	Vancouver Canucks	NHL	73	4	1	5	109	10	1	0	1	14
2009–10	Vancouver Canucks	NHL	56	1	1	2	142	—	—	—	—	—
2010–11	Florida Panthers	NHL	64	1	4	5	76	—	—	—	—	—
2011–12	Edmonton Oilers	NHL	43	1	2	3	64	—	—	—	—	—
2012–13	Edmonton Oilers	NHL	4	0	0	0	2	—	—	—	—	—
2012–13	Oklahoma City Barons	AHL	22	0	1	1	12	3	0	0	0	2
NHL totals			542	20	21	41	1140	17	1	0	1	16
