= Ruslan Zainullin =

Russian professional ice hockey center (born 1982)

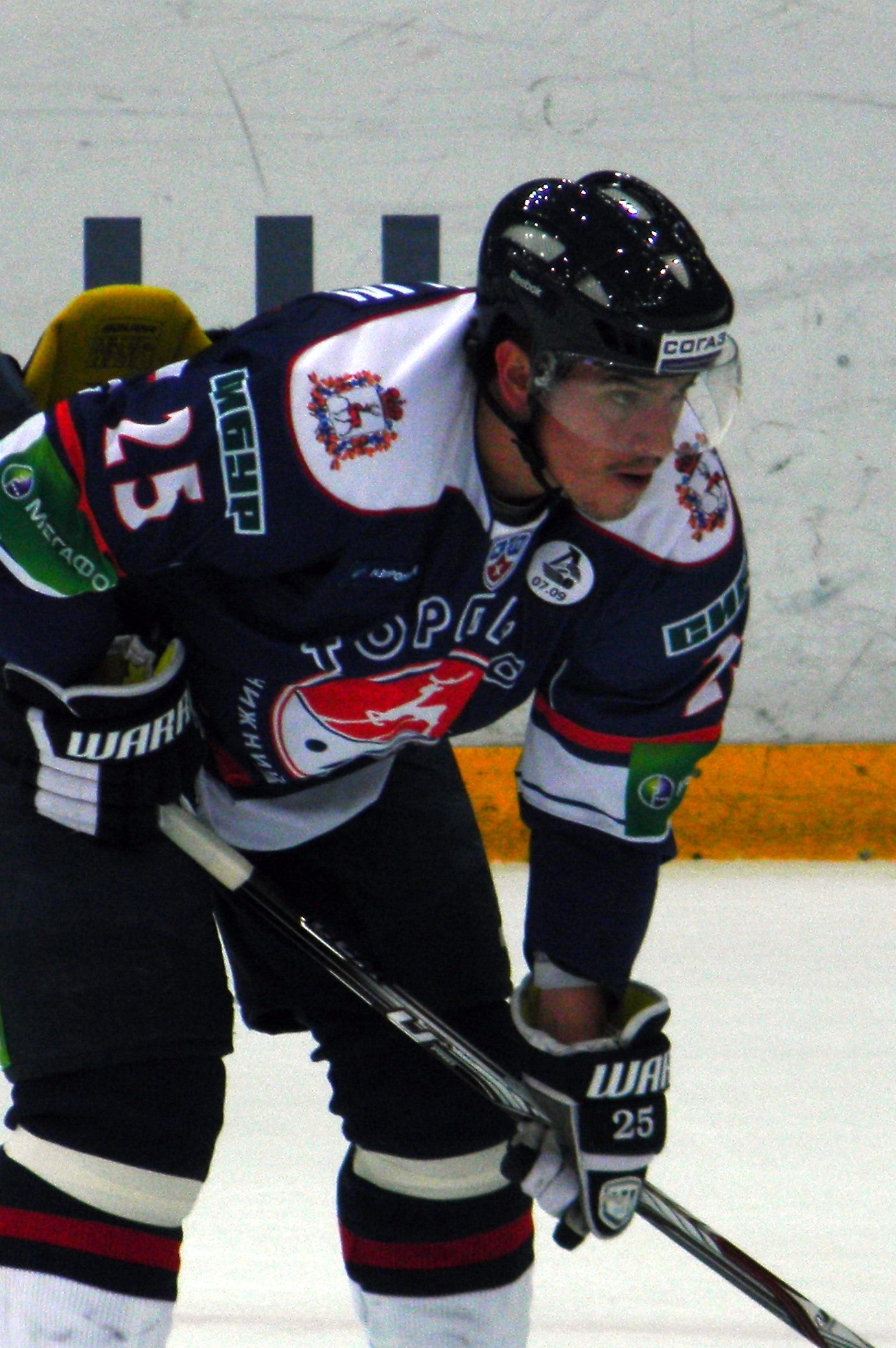
- Born: 14 February 1982 (age 44) Kazan, Soviet Union
- Height: 6 ft 2 in (188 cm)
- Weight: 218 lb (99 kg; 15 st 8 lb)
- Position: Right wing
- VHL team Former teams: Kuban Krasnodar; Ak Bars Kazan; HC Neftekhimik Nizhnekamsk; HC Dynamo Moscow; HC Spartak Moscow; HC MVD; Torpedo Nizhny Novgorod; HC CSKA Moscow
- NHL draft: 34th overall, 2000; Tampa Bay Lightning
- Playing career: 1999–2016

Ruslan Faritovich Zainullin (Russian: Руслан Фаритович Зайнуллин; born 14 February 1982) is a Russian professional ice hockey center currently playing for Kuban Krasnodar of the Russian second tier Higher Hockey League (VHL).

== Playing career ==
Zainullin was drafted 34th overall by the Tampa Bay Lightning in the 2000 NHL entry draft after playing his first professional season in the Russian Super League with Ak Bars Kazan. Despite being drafted in the NHL, Zainullin has never played in the league, opting to remain in Russia.

Playing with HC MVD in 2007–08, he recorded his most prolific season with 23 points in 50 games.

== Career statistics ==
=== Regular season and playoffs ===
			Regular season					Playoffs
Season	Team	League	GP	G	A	Pts	PIM	GP	G	A	Pts	PIM
1997–98	Ak Bars–2 Kazan	RUS.3	27	0	1	1	2	—	—	—	—	—
1998–99	Ak Bars–2 Kazan	RUS.3	36	13	8	21	22	—	—	—	—	—
1999–2000	Ak Bars Kazan	RSL	15	1	1	2	4	—	—	—	—	—
1999–2000	Ak Bars–2 Kazan	RUS.3	16	16	4	20	12	—	—	—	—	—
1999–2000	Neftyanik Leninogorsk	RUS.2	2	2	0	2	2	—	—	—	—	—
2000–01	Ak Bars Kazan	RSL	32	1	3	4	12	2	0	0	0	0
2000–01	Ak Bars–2 Kazan	RUS.3	11	10	3	13	53	—	—	—	—	—
2001–02	Ak Bars Kazan	RSL	24	0	2	2	8	3	0	0	0	2
2001–02	Ak Bars–2 Kazan	RUS.3	7	7	8	15	10	—	—	—	—	—
2002–03	Ak Bars Kazan	RSL	4	0	1	1	2	—	—	—	—	—
2002–03	Ak Bars–2 Kazan	RUS.3	10	4	10	14	10	—	—	—	—	—
2002–03	Neftekhimik Nizhnekamsk	RSL	13	1	1	2	8	—	—	—	—	—
2003–04	Dynamo Moscow	RSL	47	3	5	8	30	3	0	0	0	0
2003–04	Dynamo–2 Moscow	RUS.3	3	2	1	3	16	—	—	—	—	—
2004–05	Spartak Moscow	RSL	45	4	5	9	28	—	—	—	—	—
2004–05	Spartak–2 Moscow	RUS.3	6	3	3	6	4	—	—	—	—	—
2005–06	Spartak Moscow	RSL	40	7	3	10	22	3	0	0	0	4
2005–06	Spartak–2 Moscow	RUS.3	3	0	0	0	4	—	—	—	—	—
2006–07	HC MVD	RSL	31	3	4	7	18	3	0	0	0	2
2006–07	HC–2 MVD	RUS.4	4	3	3	6	6	—	—	—	—	—
2007–08	HC MVD	RSL	50	10	13	23	47	3	0	0	0	0
2008–09	HC MVD	KHL	49	12	9	21	32	—	—	—	—	—
2009–10	HC MVD	KHL	25	3	6	9	8	20	1	3	4	16
2010–11	Dynamo Moscow	KHL	29	4	2	6	16	3	0	0	0	2
2011–12	Torpedo Nizhny Novgorod	KHL	49	9	5	14	22	13	1	1	2	12
2012–13	Torpedo Nizhny Novgorod	KHL	46	8	4	12	67	—	—	—	—	—
2013–14	CSKA Moscow	KHL	20	1	0	1	2	—	—	—	—	—
2013–14	HC Kuban	VHL	2	1	0	1	0	1	1	1	2	0
2014–15	HC Kuban	VHL	31	11	9	20	41	7	1	3	4	8
2015–16	THK Tver	VHL	14	2	0	2	29	7	1	1	2	10
RSL totals			301	30	38	68	179	17	0	0	0	8
KHL totals			218	40	23	63	147	36	2	4	6	30

=== International ===
Year	Team	Event	Result	GP	G	A	Pts	PIM
2000	Russia	WJC18	2nd place, silver medalist(s)	6	3	4	7	8
2002	Russia	WJC	1st place, gold medalist(s)	7	0	1	1	2
Junior totals				13	3	5	8	10

== Transactions ==
- 5 March 2001 - Traded to Phoenix Coyotes by Tampa Bay with Mike Johnson, Paul Mara and New York Islanders' 2nd-round choice (previously acquired, Phoenix selected Matthew Spiller) in 2001 NHL entry draft for Nikolai Khabibulin and Stan Neckar.
- 19 March 2002 - Rights traded to Atlanta Thrashers by Phoenix with Kirill Safronov and Phoenix's 4th-round choice (Patrick Dwyer) in 2002 NHL entry draft for Darcy Hordichuk and Atlanta's 4th (Lance Monych) and 5th (John Zeiler) round choices in 2002 NHL Entry Draft.
- 15 November 2002 - Traded to Calgary Flames by Atlanta for Marc Savard.
