= Jonas Rönnqvist =

Swedish ice hockey player (born 1973)

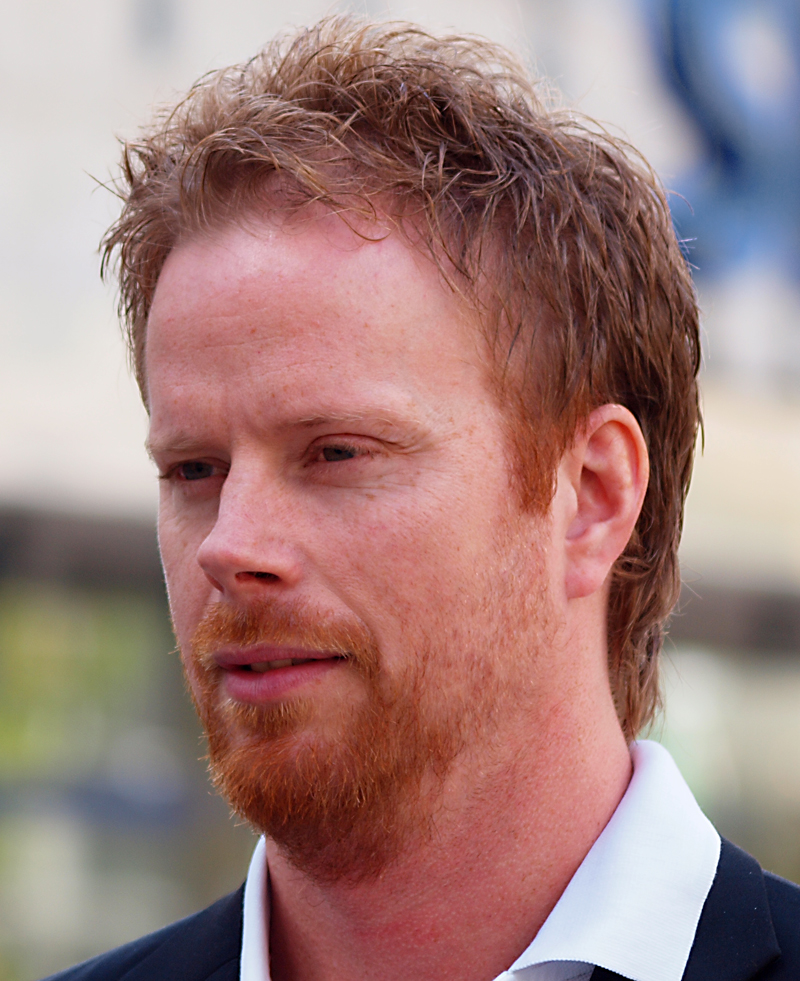
- Jonas Rönnqvist in 2010
- Born: 22 August 1973 (age 53) Kalix, Sweden
- Height: 6 ft 2 in (188 cm)
- Weight: 201 lb (91 kg; 14 st 5 lb)
- Position: Left wing
- Shot: Left
- Played for: Luleå HF; Mighty Ducks of Anaheim
- NHL draft: 98th overall, 2000; Mighty Ducks of Anaheim
- Playing career: 1991–2005

Jonas Karl Rönnqvist (born 22 August 1973) is a Swedish former professional ice hockey player who played 38 games in the National Hockey League (NHL) for the Mighty Ducks of Anaheim during the 2000–01 NHL season. The rest of his career, which lasted from 1991 to 2005, was mainly spent in Sweden, where he played for Luleå HF and Bodens IK. After retiring he became a coach, and was the head coach of Luleå from 2010 to 2014.

== Playing career ==
Drafted 98th overall by the Ducks in the 2000 NHL entry draft from Swedish side Luleå HF, Rönnqvist played 38 regular season games during the 2000–01 NHL season, scoring four assists and collecting 14 penalty minutes. After spending the entirety of the 2001–02 season with the Ducks' AHL affiliate the Cincinnati Mighty Ducks, Rönnqvist returned to Luleå where he remained until his retirement in 2005, caused by an injury.

== Coaching career ==
Rönnqvist coached Almtuna in the Swedish secondary league, almost clinching a surprising promotion to the Swedish Elite League in 2010. That earned Rönnqvist a contract to coach Luleå, his former club as a player.

== Career statistics ==
=== Regular season and playoffs ===
			Regular season					Playoffs
Season	Team	League	GP	G	A	Pts	PIM	GP	G	A	Pts	PIM
1988–89	Kalix HF	SWE-3	1	0	0	0	—	—	—	—	—	—
1989–90	Luleå HF	SWE U18	—	—	—	—	—	—	—	—	—	—
1989–90	Luleå HF	SWE U20	—	—	—	—	—	—	—	—	—	—
1991–92	Bodens IK	SWE-2	6	1	1	2	2	1	0	0	0	0
1992–93	Bodens IK	SWE-2	35	10	4	14	16	—	—	—	—	—
1993–94	Bodens IK	SWE-2	34	15	10	25	24	9	1	1	2	6
1994–95	Bodens IK	J20	1	1	0	1	2	—	—	—	—	—
1994–95	Bodens IK	SWE-2	35	10	5	15	20	8	1	0	1	0
1995–96	Bodens IK	SWE-2	26	12	10	22	26	—	—	—	—	—
1996–97	Bodens IK	SWE-2	32	15	14	29	48	—	—	—	—	—
1997–98	Luleå HF	SEL	40	6	8	14	26	3	0	0	0	2
1998–99	Luleå HF	SEL	41	5	8	13	30	3	0	2	2	29
1999–00	Luleå HF	SEL	49	15	24	39	42	8	3	3	6	4
2000–01	Mighty Ducks of Anaheim	NHL	38	0	4	4	14	—	—	—	—	—
2000–01	Cincinnati Mighty Ducks	AHL	13	3	2	5	6	—	—	—	—	—
2001–02	Cincinnati Mighty Ducks	AHL	74	10	18	28	30	3	0	0	0	0
2002–03	Luleå HF	SEL	46	10	23	33	28	4	0	1	1	0
2003–04	Luleå HF	SEL	50	11	25	36	28	5	2	1	3	2
2004–05	Luleå HF	SEL	49	5	31	36	36	2	0	1	1	0
SWE-2 totals			168	63	44	107	136	18	2	1	3	6
SEL totals			275	52	119	171	190	25	5	8	13	37
NHL totals			38	0	4	4	14	—	—	—	—	—

=== International ===
Year	Team	Event	GP	G	A	Pts	PIM
2000	Sweden	WC	7	0	3	3	0
Senior totals			7	0	3	3	0
