= Scott Kelman =

Canadian ice hockey player (born 1981)

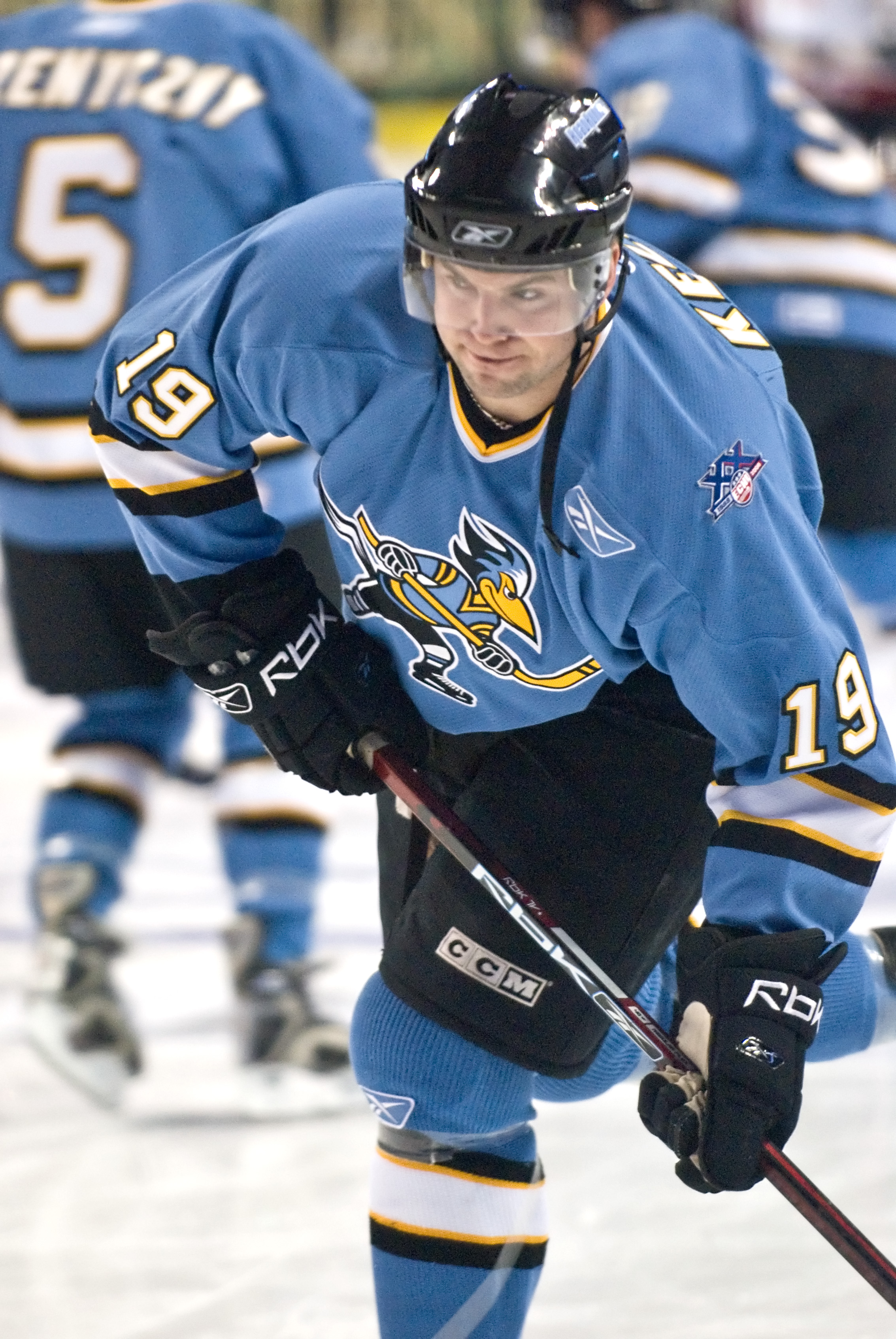
- Born: May 7, 1981 (age 45) Winnipeg, Manitoba, Canada
- Height: 6 ft 3 in (191 cm)
- Weight: 197 lb (89 kg; 14 st 1 lb)
- Position: Centre
- Shot: Left
- Played for: San Antonio Rampage; Manitoba Moose; Hershey Bears; Lowell Lock Monsters; Albany River Rats; Coventry Blaze
- NHL draft: 15th overall, 1999; Phoenix Coyotes
- Playing career: 2002–2009

Scott Kelman (born May 7, 1981) is a Canadian former professional ice hockey centre who was drafted in the first round, 15th overall, by the Phoenix Coyotes in the 1999 NHL entry draft.

Over seven seasons, Kelman predominantly played in the American Hockey League and ECHL. He concluded his professional career after the 2008–09 EIHL season abroad with the Coventry Blaze in the Elite Ice Hockey League.

== Career statistics ==
			Regular season					Playoffs
Season	Team	League	GP	G	A	Pts	PIM	GP	G	A	Pts	PIM
1996–97	Seattle Thunderbirds	WHL	5	0	1	1	0	—	—	—	—	—
1997–98	Seattle Thunderbirds	WHL	61	13	17	30	35	5	0	0	0	4
1998–99	Seattle Thunderbirds	WHL	66	19	54	73	95	11	4	3	7	37
1999–2000	Seattle Thunderbirds	WHL	64	13	42	55	104	2	0	0	0	2
2000–01	Seattle Thunderbirds	WHL	10	5	6	11	10	—	—	—	—	—
2000–01	Moose Jaw Warriors	WHL	60	15	18	33	130	4	0	1	1	12
2001–02	Moose Jaw Warriors	WHL	3	1	0	1	2	—	—	—	—	—
2001–02	Tri-City Americans	WHL	68	33	50	83	80	5	1	1	2	12
2002–03	Jackson Bandits	ECHL	51	14	18	32	93	1	0	0	0	4
2002–03	San Antonio Rampage	AHL	1	0	0	0	0	—	—	—	—	—
2003–04	Augusta Lynx	ECHL	47	15	32	47	104	—	—	—	—	—
2003–04	San Antonio Rampage	AHL	17	1	4	5	14	—	—	—	—	—
2004–05	Laredo Bucks	CHL	41	14	21	35	56	—	—	—	—	—
2004–05	San Antonio Rampage	AHL	24	1	1	2	25	—	—	—	—	—
2005–06	Gwinnett Gladiators	ECHL	46	14	33	47	104	—	—	—	—	—
2005–06	Manitoba Moose	AHL	3	0	2	2	2	—	—	—	—	—
2005–06	Hershey Bears	AHL	2	0	0	0	0	—	—	—	—	—
2005–06	Lowell Lock Monsters	AHL	19	6	7	13	49	—	—	—	—	—
2005–06	Fresno Falcons	ECHL	—	—	—	—	—	13	1	5	6	28
2006–07	Albany River Rats	AHL	32	5	9	14	44	—	—	—	—	—
2007–08	Phoenix RoadRunners	ECHL	32	7	18	25	30	—	—	—	—	—
2007–08	Dayton Bombers	ECHL	27	4	8	12	62	2	0	0	0	0
2008–09	Coventry Blaze	EIHL	30	10	17	27	79	—	—	—	—	—
ECHL totals			203	54	109	163	393	16	1	5	6	32
AHL totals			98	13	23	36	134	—	—	—	—	—

Awards and achievements
Preceded by Patrick DesRochers	Phoenix Coyotes first-round draft pick 1999	Succeeded by Kirill Safronov
