= Kirill Safronov =

Russian ice hockey player (born 1981)

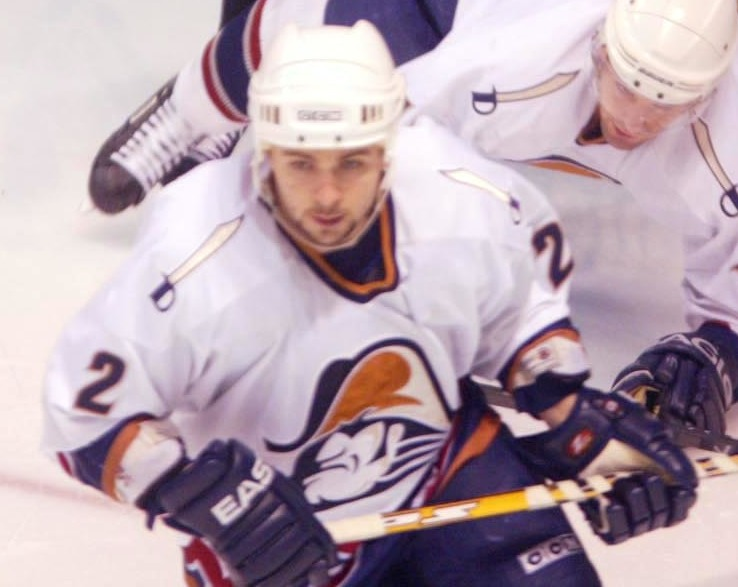
- Safronov with the Milwaukee Admirals in 2004
- Born: 26 February 1981 (age 45) Leningrad, Russian SFSR, Soviet Union
- Height: 6 ft 2 in (188 cm)
- Weight: 196 lb (89 kg; 14 st 0 lb)
- Position: Defence
- Shot: Left
- Played for: SKA St. Petersburg; Phoenix Coyotes; Atlanta Thrashers; Lokomotiv Yaroslavl; Khimik Voskresensk; Neftekhimik Nizhnekamsk; Sibir Novosibirsk; Yugra Khanty-Mansiysk; Amur Khabarovsk
- NHL draft: 19th overall, 1999; Phoenix Coyotes
- Playing career: 1996–2016

Kirill Alekseevich Safronov (Russian: Кирилл Алексеевич Сафронов; born 26 February 1981) is a Russian former professional ice hockey defenceman.

== Playing career ==
Safronov was selected in the first round, 19th overall, by the Phoenix Coyotes in the 1999 NHL entry draft. Drafted from the Russian Superleague's SKA Saint Petersburg, Safronov made his North American debut with the Quebec Remparts of the Quebec Major Junior Hockey League (QMJHL) in the 1999–2000 season. After one season with the Remparts, he joined the Coyotes' American Hockey League (AHL) affiliate, the Springfield Falcons.

Safronov appeared in one game with the Coyotes during the 2001–02 season before being traded to the Atlanta Thrashers (along with Ruslan Zainullin and a draft pick) in exchange for Darcy Hordichuk and two draft picks. Safronov appeared in two games with the Thrashers in 2001–02, in-between winning the Calder Cup with their AHL affiliate, the Chicago Wolves, and 32 more in 2002–03 season before being traded to the Nashville Predators (along with Simon Gamache) for Ben Simon and Tomáš Klouček. He spent the remainder of the season with the Predators' AHL affiliate, the Milwaukee Admirals, winning another Calder Cup.

Safronov returned to Russia during the 2004–05 NHL lockout and played there until retiring in 2015.

== Awards ==
- Awarded the Raymond Lagacé Trophy (QMJHL defensive rookie of the year) in 2000.
- 2x Calder Cup champion (2002, 2004)

== Career statistics ==
=== Regular season and playoffs ===
			Regular season					Playoffs
Season	Team	League	GP	G	A	Pts	PIM	GP	G	A	Pts	PIM
1996–97	SKA St. Petersburg	RSL	1	0	0	0	0	—	—	—	—	—
1996–97	SKA–2 St. Petersburg	RUS.3	9	0	0	0	6	—	—	—	—	—
1996–97	SKA–3 St. Petersburg	RUS.4	1	1	0	1	0	—	—	—	—	—
1997–98	SKA St. Petersburg	RSL	9	0	1	1	4	—	—	—	—	—
1997–98	SKA–2 St. Petersburg	RUS.3	25	4	2	6	28	—	—	—	—	—
1998–99	SKA St. Petersburg	RSL	35	1	1	2	26	—	—	—	—	—
1998–99	SKA–2 St. Petersburg	RUS.3	4	2	1	3	2	—	—	—	—	—
1999–2000	Quebec Remparts	QMJHL	55	11	32	43	95	11	2	4	6	14
2000–01	Springfield Falcons	AHL	66	5	13	18	77	—	—	—	—	—
2001–02	Springfield Falcons	AHL	68	3	19	22	26	—	—	—	—	—
2001–02	Phoenix Coyotes	NHL	1	0	0	0	0	—	—	—	—	—
2001–02	Atlanta Thrashers	NHL	2	0	0	0	2	—	—	—	—	—
2001–02	Chicago Wolves	AHL	8	0	2	2	2	25	2	6	8	8
2002–03	Atlanta Thrashers	NHL	32	2	2	4	14	—	—	—	—	—
2002–03	Chicago Wolves	AHL	44	4	15	19	29	9	1	2	3	4
2003–04	Chicago Wolves	AHL	21	1	4	5	8	—	—	—	—	—
2003–04	Milwaukee Admirals	AHL	59	4	16	20	41	21	0	6	6	20
2004–05	Lokomotiv Yaroslavl	RSL	19	0	1	1	49	—	—	—	—	—
2004–05	Lokomotiv–2 Yaroslavl	RUS.3	1	0	0	0	0	—	—	—	—	—
2004–05	Khimik Voskresensk	RSL	35	5	8	13	34	—	—	—	—	—
2005–06	SKA St. Petersburg	RSL	46	1	11	12	40	2	0	0	0	0
2005–06	SKA–2 St. Petersburg	RUS.3	1	1	1	2	0	—	—	—	—	—
2006–07	SKA St. Petersburg	RSL	46	2	3	5	68	3	0	0	0	2
2006–07	SKA–2 St. Petersburg	RUS.3	1	0	0	0	0	—	—	—	—	—
2007–08	SKA St. Petersburg	RSL	57	9	14	23	47	9	1	4	5	2
2008–09	SKA St. Petersburg	KHL	38	1	8	9	30	1	0	0	0	0
2008–09	SKA–2 St. Petersburg	RUS.3	—	—	—	—	—	3	0	0	0	4
2009–10	SKA St. Petersburg	KHL	14	0	1	1	8	—	—	—	—	—
2009–10	VMF St. Petersburg	VHL	2	1	0	1	0	—	—	—	—	—
2010–11	Neftekhimik Nizhnekamsk	KHL	13	0	2	2	12	—	—	—	—	—
2010–11	Sibir Novosibirsk	KHL	2	0	0	0	2	4	0	0	0	16
2011–12	Sibir Novosibirsk	KHL	48	0	8	8	2	—	—	—	—	—
2012–13	Sibir Novosibirsk	KHL	15	0	0	0	22	—	—	—	—	—
2012-13	Yugra Khanty–Mansiysk	KHL	16	1	6	7	22	—	—	—	—	—
2013–14	Yugra Khanty–Mansiysk	KHL	6	0	0	0	0	—	—	—	—	—
2013–14	Lada Togliatti	VHL	2	0	0	0	2	—	—	—	—	—
2013–14	HKM Zvolen	SVK	7	0	2	2	6	4	0	0	0	6
2014–15	Amur Khabarovsk	KHL	48	1	12	13	39	—	—	—	—	—
RSL totals			248	18	40	58	263	26	1	6	7	8
NHL totals			35	2	2	4	16	—	—	—	—	—
KHL totals			200	3	37	40	165	5	0	0	0	16

=== International ===
Year	Team	Event	GP	G	A	Pts	PIM
1998	Russia	EJC	6	0	1	1	8
1999	Russia	WJC	7	0	2	2	8
1999	Russia	U18	7	0	2	2	28
2000	Russia	WJC	7	0	3	3	6
Junior totals			27	0	8	8	50

Preceded by Scott Kelman	Phoenix Coyotes first-round draft pick 1999	Succeeded by Krystofer Kolanos
Preceded by Aleksei Volkov	Winner of the Raymond Lagacé Trophy; 1999–2000	Succeeded by Tomáš Malec
