= Nikolai Khabibulin =

Russian ice hockey player (born 1973)

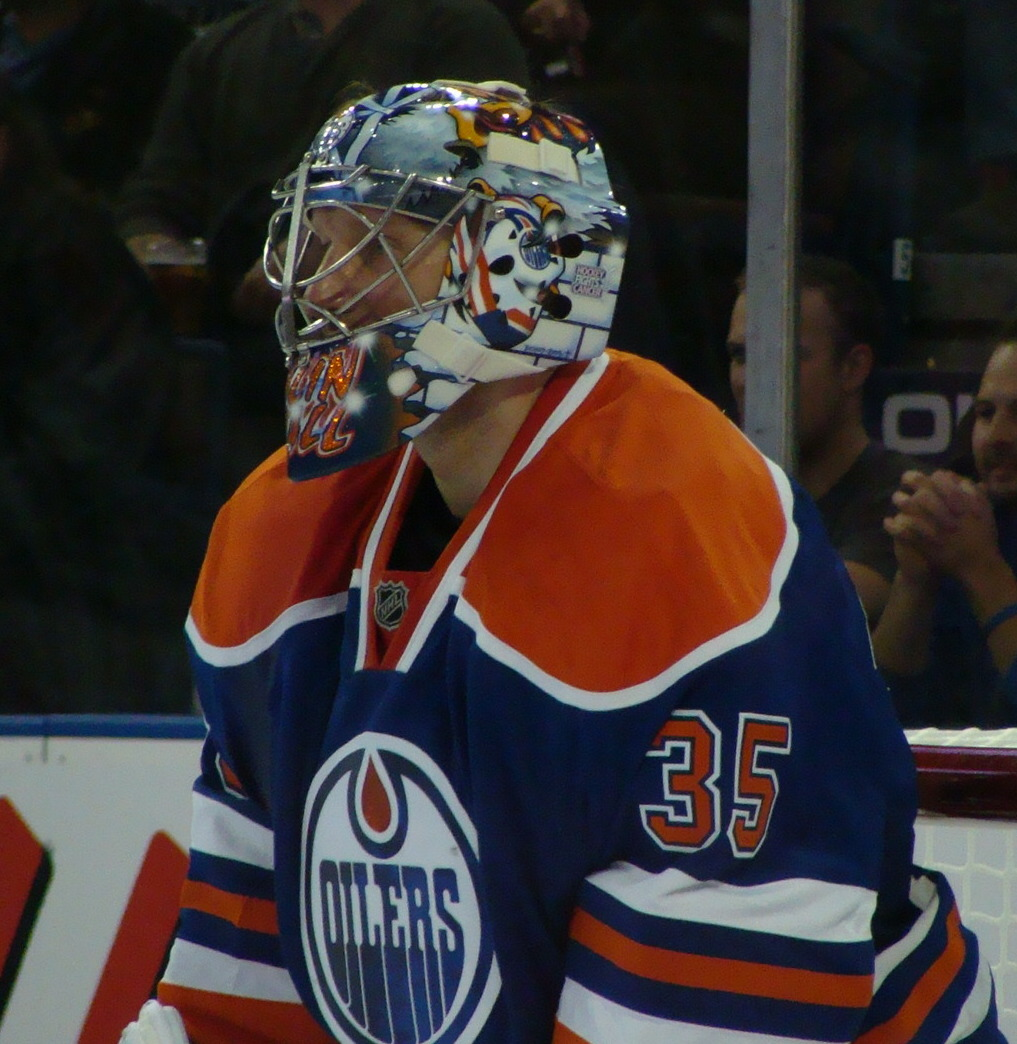
- Khabibulin with the Edmonton Oilers in October 2009
- Born: January 13, 1973 (age 53) Sverdlovsk, Russian SFSR, Soviet Union
- Height: 6 ft 1 in (185 cm)
- Weight: 208 lb (94 kg; 14 st 12 lb)
- Position: Goaltender
- Caught: Left
- Played for: Avtomobilist Sverdlovsk; CSKA Moscow; Winnipeg Jets; Phoenix Coyotes; Tampa Bay Lightning; Ak Bars Kazan; Chicago Blackhawks; Edmonton Oilers
- National team: Unified Team and Russia
- NHL draft: 204th overall, 1992; Winnipeg Jets
- Playing career: 1994–2024

Nikolai Alexandrovich Khabibulin (/ˌhæbiˈbuːlɪn/; Russian: Николай Александрович Хабибулин, IPA: [xəbʲɪˈbulʲɪn], born January 13, 1973) is a Russian former professional ice hockey goaltender. Known by the nickname "the Bulin Wall", he spent the majority of his playing career in the National Hockey League (NHL) with the Winnipeg Jets, Phoenix Coyotes, Chicago Blackhawks, Tampa Bay Lightning, and Edmonton Oilers.

At the international level, he won two Olympic medals (gold and bronze) and was named Best Goaltender at the 2002 Winter Olympics. He was the first Russian goaltender to win the Stanley Cup, doing so with Tampa Bay in 2004; until 2020, he was also the only Russian goaltender to start in the Finals. He is also a four-time NHL All-Star.

== Playing career ==
=== Winnipeg Jets/Phoenix Coyotes (1994–99) ===
Khabibulin was selected in the ninth round of the 1992 NHL entry draft by the Winnipeg Jets. In the 1993–94 season, he played with the touring Russian Penguins and by the start of the NHL season in January 1995, was playing in the NHL. In 1996, he moved with the Jets to Phoenix, Arizona, where they became the Phoenix Coyotes. In five years with the Jets/Coyotes franchise, he started at least 60 games in three of those seasons (including two instances in which he played 70 games).

After the 1998–99 season, Khabibulin became embroiled in a contract dispute with the Coyotes and ended up holding out for an entire season. During this year, he played for the Long Beach Ice Dogs of the International Hockey League (IHL), earning the James Gatschene Memorial Trophy as league MVP.

=== Tampa Bay Lightning (2001–2004) ===
On March 5, 2001, Khabibulin was traded to the Tampa Bay Lightning in exchange for Mike Johnson, Paul Mara, Ruslan Zainullin and the New York Islanders' second-round choice (previously acquired; Phoenix selected Matthew Spiller). Khabibulin signed a contract with Tampa Bay. At the 2002 NHL All-Star Game his flawless, 20-save third period allowed the World All-Stars to rally for a comeback 8–5 win. Although Éric Dazé of the Chicago Blackhawks was chosen as the All-Star MVP, Khabibulin's play was the talk of both locker rooms. Many players were surprised that Khabibulin was not named MVP, an honour they felt was deserved and obvious.

Joined by Vincent Lecavalier, Martin St. Louis and Brad Richards, Khabibulin helped lead the Lightning back to the playoffs in 2003, their first appearance since 1996, and then to the Stanley Cup in 2004, the first in franchise history. Khabibulin recorded five shutouts in 23 playoff games, including three shutouts in the first-round match-up against the New York Islanders (tied for an NHL record for most shutouts in a playoff round). During the 2004–05 NHL lockout, Khabibulin was one of many Russian players to return to their homeland. From November 2004, he played for Ak Bars Kazan in Kazan.

=== Chicago Blackhawks (2005–2009) ===
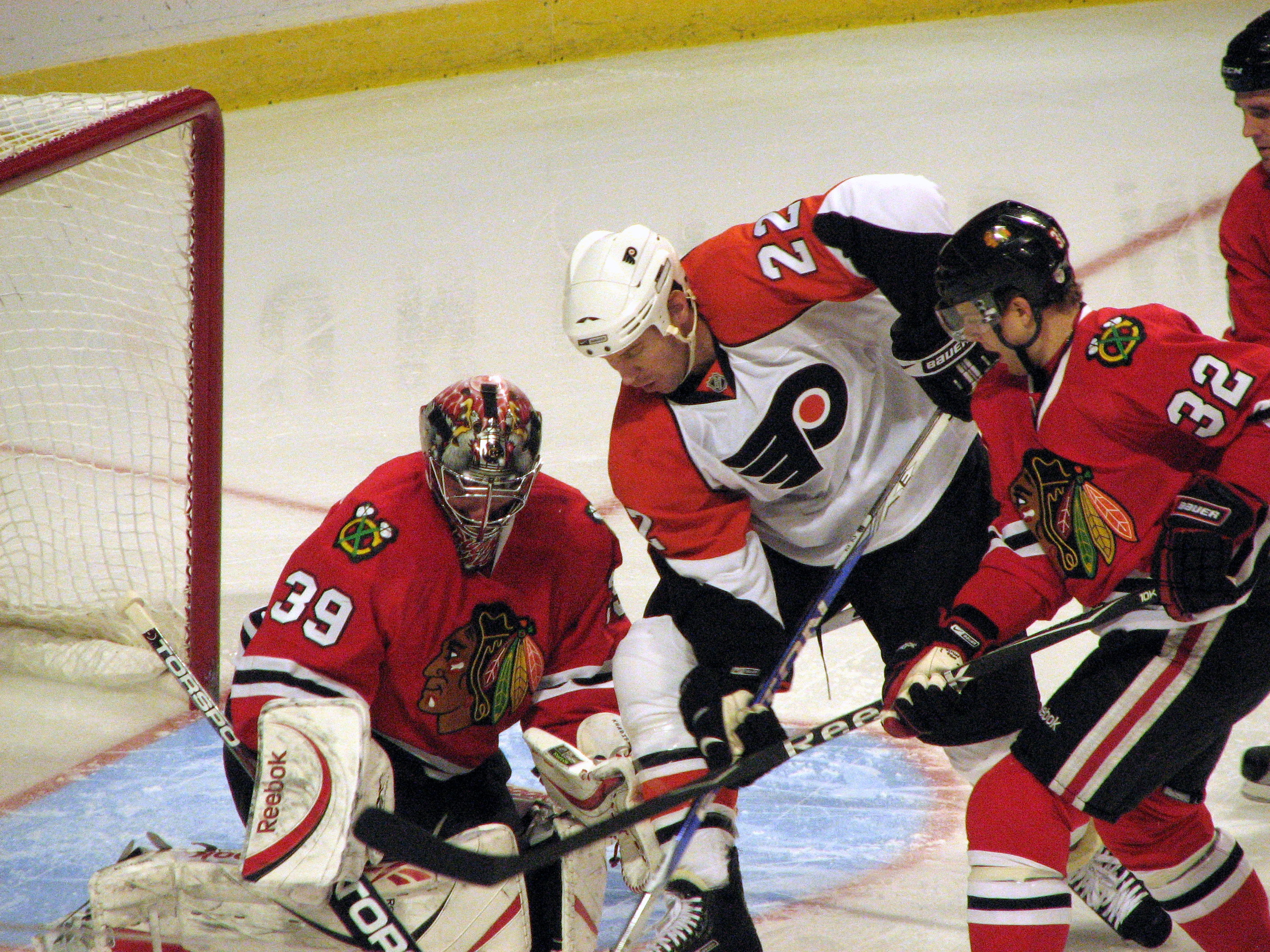
Khabibulin #39 with the Blackhawks stopping a scoring chance from Mike Knuble with the help of teammate Kris Versteeg in December 2008

As the National Hockey League Players' Association (NHLPA) ratified a new collective bargaining agreement (CBA), Khabibulin became a free agent when play was set to resume. Coming off his Stanley Cup win the previous NHL season, the Chicago Blackhawks signed him to a four-year, $27 million deal, making him the highest paid goaltender in the League. In his first season with the Blackhawks, he recorded a 3.35 goals against average (GAA) — the highest of his career since his rookie season in Winnipeg — and Chicago finished second-to-last in the Western Conference.

In July 2008, the Blackhawks signed goaltender Cristobal Huet, previously of the Washington Capitals. The signing of Huet was thought to have effectively displaced Khabibulin as the starting goaltender, especially given he was put on waivers on September 29, 2008, but cleared. In light of Huet and Khabibulin's combined salaries (Huet was signed to a contract averaging $5.6 million per season), it was speculated Khabibulin would be traded to provide cap space. He spent the entire season with the team, however, playing in 42 games, and by the start of the 2009 playoffs, he had retrenched himself as starting goaltender. Khabibulin and the Blackhawks defeated the Calgary Flames and Vancouver Canucks to progress to the Western Conference Finals against the Detroit Red Wings. During the third game of the series, Khabibulin surrendered three goals in one period after shutting out the Red Wings in the previous period. He was replaced by Huet for the third period due to a lower body injury. Khabibulin missed the remaining three games of the series as a result of the injury.

=== Edmonton Oilers (2009–2013) ===
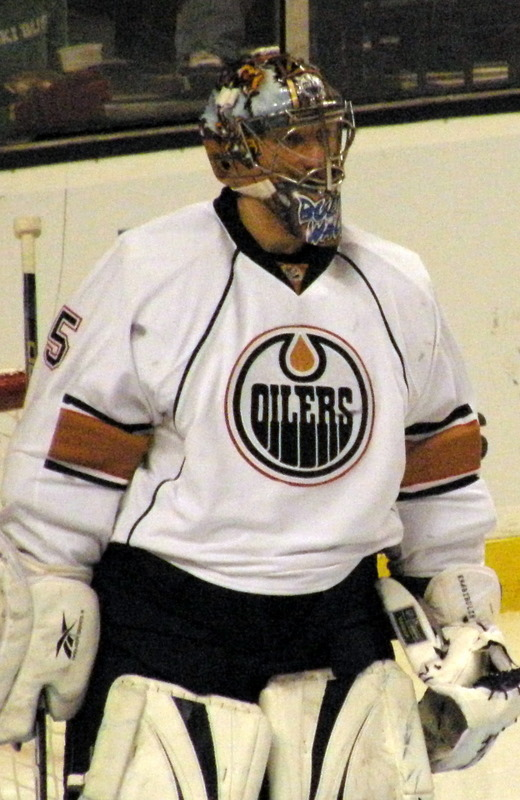
Khabibulin with the Oilers in October 2009

On July 1, 2009, Khabibulin signed a four-year, $15 million contract with the Edmonton Oilers, replacing Dwayne Roloson as the Oilers' starting goaltender. In his Oilers debut on October 3 against the Calgary Flames, while trying to field a clearing pass in the final minute of the third period, he mishandled the puck and gave up the game-winning goal to Flames' right wing David Moss. On January 13, 2010, it was announced that Khabibulin would have surgery to repair a herniated disk in his back. He missed the remainder of the regular season.

Khabibulin kicked off the 2010–11 season with a 37-save performance in a 4–0 victory over the Calgary Flames. Injuries, however, once again limited his action. He recorded a record of 10–32–3, as the Oilers were again last place in the Western Conference. Due to Khabibulin's strong play in October of the 2011–12 season, posting a 5–0–2 record, with an NHL-leading .960 save percentage and a 1.12 GAA, he was named the Third Star of the Month. Khabibulin's play fell off in the second half of the season, however, and he ended the season with an average 2.65 GAA and a .910 save percentage. In the lockout-shortened 2012–13 season, his former backup, Devan Dubnyk, replaced him as the team's starting goaltender. This was Khabibulin's first season as a backup.

=== Return to Chicago (2013–14) ===
On July 5, 2013, Khabibulin signed a one-year, $2 million contract to play for the Blackhawks for the 2013–14 season. It was his second stint with Chicago after previously playing for them from 2005 to 2009. He served as the backup goaltender to Corey Crawford.

Khabibulin suffered an injury in a loss to the Nashville Predators on November 16, 2013, and was placed on injured reserve the next day. As a result, goaltender Antti Raanta was recalled from the Blackhawks' American Hockey league (AHL) affiliate, the Rockford IceHogs. He never played another game in the NHL after sustaining the hip injury. Khabibulin announced his intentions to retire on November 13, 2015. He has expressed an interest in continuing his hockey career in management.

=== Torpedo Nizhny Novgorod (2023–2024) ===
Khabibulin retired from playing hockey after the 2013–14 NHL season but remained in the sport as goaltender coach for Torpedo Nizhny Novgorod of the Kontinental Hockey League (KHL). On December 27, 2023, he un-retired and became a goaltender for Torpedo at the age of 50. He did not feature with the club competitively, training with the club for the remainder of the season.

== International play ==
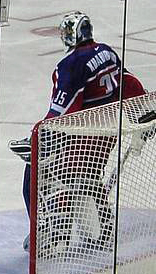
- Khabibulin at the 2002 Winter Olympics.

Medal record

Men's ice hockey

Representing Russia & CIS

Olympic Games
Gold medal – first place	1992 Albertville	
Bronze medal – third place	2002 Salt Lake City	

World Junior Championships
Gold medal – first place	1992 Germany	

Khabibulin made his international debut with the Soviet Union at the 1991 European Junior Championships. He appeared in the 1992 World Junior Championships the next year and won a gold medal with the CIS, appearing in six games. Khabibulin and the national team had begun the tournament as the Soviet Union, but the state was dissolved following the round robin on New Year's Day, thus they proceeded to compete as the Commonwealth of Independent States (CIS).

That same year, Khabibulin appeared in the 1992 Winter Olympics with the CIS as the third goaltender. He remains the last active player from Russia to win the Olympic Games. Controversy arose after the CIS captured the gold medal when Russian coach Viktor Tikhonov kept a medal for himself (coaches and management are not awarded medals in Olympic hockey) instead of allowing Khabibulin to have one, as Khabibulin had not played a game in the tournament.

At the 2002 Winter Olympics, in which the 1992 gold medal conflict was resolved, Khabibulin established himself as the national team's starting goaltender. He helped Russia to a bronze medal while appearing in all six games, and was named Best Goaltender of the tournament. Also at the 2002 Winter Olympics in Salt Lake City, Khabibulin was finally awarded his 1992 Olympic gold medal in a private locker room ceremony with teammates and the Russian Hockey Federation.

After his second season with the Winnipeg Jets of the NHL, Khabibulin competed with Russia in the 1996 World Cup. He appeared in two games. Khabibulin was called up again in the 2006 Winter Olympics in Turin, but missed the tournament due to injury. Russia's starting goaltender was the San Jose Sharks' Evgeni Nabokov. Khabibulin did not play a game in either tournament, in which Russia failed to win a medal.

== Personal life ==
On February 8, 2010, Khabibulin was pulled over in Arizona by a police officer for surpassing the legal speed limit by 25 miles per hour. The officer noted various signs that suggested Khabibulin could have been under the influence of alcohol, and proceeded to administer a field sobriety test. Khabibulin was subsequently arrested and charged with speeding and impaired driving. On July 7, 2010, Khabibulin's court case was postponed. On August 27, 2010, Khabibulin was found guilty of excessive speed, extreme DUI and DUI over the 0.08 level. On August 31, 2010, he received the minimum sentence of 30 days in jail, which he then tried to appeal. On July 26, 2011, Khabibulin withdrew the appeal, and was sentenced to 30 days in jail. He was in a jail for half of the time, and under house arrest for the other half. Khabibulin served his sentence in Joe Arpaio's Tent City jail.

Khabibulin helped Victoria Azarenka settle in Scottsdale when she moved from Belarus to pursue a career in tennis. His wife is friends with Azarenka's mother and decided to help her. They have become close friends since.

== Awards and achievements ==
=== NHL ===
- Played in the NHL All-Star Game — 1998, 1999, 2002, 2003
- 2004 NHL Stanley Cup champion — Tampa Bay Lightning
- NHL 1997 Stanley Cup Playoffs — Save percentage Leader (.932)
- NHL 2004 Stanley Cup Playoffs — Wins Leader (16)
- NHL 2004 Stanley Cup Playoffs — Shutouts Leader (5)
- Tied NHL record for most Shutouts in a Playoff Round — (3)
- 2011–12 season — Lowest GAA through the first nine games of a season since the NHL expansion (1967–68 season) (0.98)

=== International ===
- 1992 Winter Olympics (Ice Hockey) – Gold Medal
- 2002 Winter Olympics (Ice Hockey) – Bronze Medal
- 2002 Winter Olympics (Ice Hockey) – Best Goaltender Award (Directorate)

=== Other ===
- Won the James Gatschene Memorial Trophy (IHL) MVP) in 2000.

== Career statistics ==
=== Regular season and playoffs ===
			Regular season										Playoffs
Season	Team	League	GP	W	L	T	OTL	MIN	GA	SO	GAA	SV%	GP	W	L	MIN	GA	SO	GAA	SV%
1988–89	Avtomobilist Sverdlovsk	URS	1	—	—	—	—	3	—	—	—	—	—	—	—	—	—	—	—	—
1989–90	Luch Sverdlovsk	URS.2	—	—	—	—	—	—	—	—	—	—	—	—	—	—	—	—	—	—
1990–91	Sputnik Nizhny Tagil	URS.2	10	—	—	—	—	—	—	—	—	—	—	—	—	—	—	—	—	—
1991–92	CSKA Moscow	CIS	2	—	—	—	—	34	2	0	3.53	—	—	—	—	—	—	—	—	—
1991–92	CSKA–2 Moscow	CIS.3	11	—	—	—	—	—	—	—	—	—	—	—	—	—	—	—	—	—
1991–92	Metallurg Serov	CIS.3	18	—	—	—	—	—	—	—	—	—	—	—	—	—	—	—	—	—
1992–93	CSKA Moscow	RUS	13	—	—	—	—	491	27	—	3.30	—	—	—	—	—	—	—	—	—
1992–93	CSKA–2 Moscow	RUS.2	18	—	—	—	—	—	—	—	—	—	—	—	—	—	—	—	—	—
1993–94	CSKA Moscow	RUS	46	—	—	—	—	2625	116	3	2.65	—	3	—	—	193	11	—	3.41	—
1994–95	Springfield Falcons	AHL	23	9	9	3	—	1241	80	0	3.87	.874	—	—	—	—	—	—	—	—
1994–95	Winnipeg Jets	NHL	26	8	9	4	—	1339	76	0	3.40	.895	—	—	—	—	—	—	—	—
1995–96	Winnipeg Jets	NHL	53	26	20	3	—	2914	152	2	3.13	.908	6	2	4	359	19	0	3.17	.911
1996–97	Phoenix Coyotes	NHL	72	30	33	6	—	4091	193	7	2.83	.908	7	3	4	426	15	1	2.11	.932
1997–98	Phoenix Coyotes	NHL	70	30	28	10	—	4026	184	4	2.74	.900	4	2	1	185	13	0	4.21	.877
1998–99	Phoenix Coyotes	NHL	63	32	23	7	—	3657	130	8	2.13	.920	7	3	4	449	18	0	2.40	.924
1999–2000	Long Beach Ice Dogs	IHL	33	21	11	1	—	1936	59	5	1.83	.930	5	2	3	321	15	0	2.80	.905
2000–01	Tampa Bay Lightning	NHL	2	1	1	0	—	123	6	0	2.93	.913	—	—	—	—	—	—	—	—
2001–02	Tampa Bay Lightning	NHL	70	24	32	10	—	3896	153	7	2.36	.920	—	—	—	—	—	—	—	—
2002–03	Tampa Bay Lightning	NHL	65	30	22	11	—	3787	156	4	2.47	.911	10	5	5	644	26	0	2.42	.913
2003–04	Tampa Bay Lightning	NHL	55	28	19	7	—	3274	127	3	2.33	.910	23	16	7	1401	40	5	1.71	.933
2004–05	Ak Bars Kazan	RSL	24	16	5	3	—	1457	40	5	1.65	.926	2	0	2	118	6	0	3.05	.846
2005–06	Chicago Blackhawks	NHL	50	17	26	—	6	2815	157	0	3.35	.886	—	—	—	—	—	—	—	—
2006–07	Chicago Blackhawks	NHL	60	25	26	—	5	3425	163	1	2.86	.902	—	—	—	—	—	—	—	—
2007–08	Chicago Blackhawks	NHL	50	23	20	—	6	2891	127	2	2.63	.909	—	—	—	—	—	—	—	—
2008–09	Chicago Blackhawks	NHL	42	25	8	—	7	2467	96	3	2.33	.919	15	8	6	881	43	0	2.93	.898
2009–10	Edmonton Oilers	NHL	18	7	9	—	2	602	55	0	3.03	.909	—	—	—	—	—	—	—	—
2010–11	Edmonton Oilers	NHL	46	10	32	—	3	1364	149	2	3.39	.891	—	—	—	—	—	—	—	—
2011–12	Edmonton Oilers	NHL	40	12	20	—	7	1114	100	2	2.65	.910	—	—	—	—	—	—	—	—
2012–13	Edmonton Oilers	NHL	12	4	6	—	1	684	29	1	2.54	.923	—	—	—	—	—	—	—	—
2013–14	Chicago Blackhawks	NHL	4	1	0	—	1	168	14	0	5.00	.811	—	—	—	—	—	—	—	—
NHL totals			799	333	334	58	39	45,607	2,071	46	2.72	.907	72	39	31	4,345	174	6	2.40	.917

=== International ===
Year	Team	Event	GP	W	L	T	MIN	GA	SO	GAA	SV%
1992	CIS	WJC	6	6	0	0	289	7	2	1.45	.907
1993	Russia	WJC	6	2	3	1	340	15	1	2.65	.917
1996	Russia	WCH	2	0	2	0	100	10	0	6.00	.825
2002	Russia	OG	6	3	2	1	359	14	1	2.34	.930
Junior totals			12	8	3	1	629	22	3	2.10	—
Senior totals			8	3	4	1	459	24	1	3.14	.904

== See also ==
- List of NHL goaltenders with 300 wins
