= Alexander Barkunov =

Russian professional ice hockey player

- Born: May 13, 1981 (age 45) Yaroslavl, USSR
- Height: 6 ft 1 in (185 cm)
- Weight: 203 lb (92 kg; 14 st 7 lb)
- Position: Forward
- Shot: Right
- VHL team Former teams: Molot-Prikamie Perm; RSL; Lokomotiv Yaroslavl; Amur Khabarovsk; Molot-Prikamye Perm; Torpedo Nizhny Novgorod
- NHL draft: 151st overall, 2000; Chicago Blackhawks
- Playing career: 1997–2011

Alexander Barkunov (born May 13, 1981) is a Russian professional ice hockey player. He was selected by Chicago Blackhawks in the 7th round (151st overall) of the 2000 NHL entry draft.

== Career statistics ==
=== Regular season and playoffs ===
			Regular season					Playoffs
Season	Team	League	GP	G	A	Pts	PIM	GP	G	A	Pts	PIM
1996–97	Torpedo–2 Yaroslavl	RUS.3	1	0	0	0	0	—	—	—	—	—
1998–99	Torpedo–2 Yaroslavl	RUS.2	19	0	3	3	8	—	—	—	—	—
1999–2000	Torpedo–2 Yaroslavl	RUS.3	38	5	9	14	58	—	—	—	—	—
2000–01	Lokomotiv Yaroslavl	RSL	35	5	1	6	8	1	0	0	0	2
2000–01	Lokomotiv–2 Yaroslavl	RUS.3	2	1	0	1	0	—	—	—	—	—
2001–02	Lokomotiv Yaroslavl	RSL	13	0	0	0	2	—	—	—	—	—
2001–02	Lokomotiv–2 Yaroslavl	RUS.3	10	1	4	5	2	—	—	—	—	—
2001–02	Amur Khabarovsk	RSL	9	0	0	0	2	—	—	—	—	—
2002–03	Molot–Prikamye Perm	RSL	28	0	1	1	18	—	—	—	—	—
2003–04	Torpedo Nizhny Novgorod	RSL	20	0	2	2	16	—	—	—	—	—
2003–04	Torpedo–2 Nizhny Novgorod	RUS.3	9	5	4	9	37	—	—	—	—	—
2004–05	Zauralie Kurgan	RUS.2	50	7	1	8	40	3	0	0	0	4
2005–06	Amur Khabarovsk	RUS.2	16	1	5	6	6	—	—	—	—	—
2005–06	Amur–2 Khabarovsk	RUS.3	1	0	0	0	2	—	—	—	—	—
2005–06	Khimik Voskresensk	RUS.2	21	3	5	8	42	6	1	1	2	4
2006–07	HC Dmitrov	RUS.2	5	0	1	1	12	—	—	—	—	—
2006–07	Molot–Prikamye Perm	RUS.2	23	1	8	9	53	—	—	—	—	—
2006–07	Molot–Prikamye–2 Perm	RUS.3	2	1	2	3	0	—	—	—	—	—
2007–08	Sputnik Nizhny Tagil	RUS.2	44	12	12	24	34	3	0	0	0	2
2007–08	Sputnik–2 Nizhny Tagil	RUS.3	1	0	1	1	0	—	—	—	—	—
2008–09	Sputnik Nizhny Tagil	RUS.2	50	5	11	16	38	9	2	2	4	8
2008–09	Sputnik–2 Nizhny Tagil	RUS.3	1	1	0	1	14	—	—	—	—	—
2009–10	Sputnik Nizhny Tagil	RUS.2	24	3	3	6	32	—	—	—	—	—
2009–10	Sputnik–2 Nizhny Tagil	RUS.3	5	0	4	4	4	—	—	—	—	—
2009–10	HC Yugra	RUS.2	4	0	1	1	0	16	0	2	2	18
2010–11	Toros Neftekamsk	VHL	11	0	0	0	2	—	—	—	—	—
2010–11	Toros–2 Neftekamsk	RUS.3	1	0	0	0	0	—	—	—	—	—
2010–11	Molot–Prikamye Perm	VHL	20	2	2	4	14	7	0	1	1	10
RUS.2 & VHL totals			287	34	52	86	281	44	3	6	9	46
RSL totals			105	5	4	9	46	1	0	0	0	2

=== International ===
Year	Team	Event	GP	G	A	Pts	PIM
2001	Russia	WJC	7	0	2	2	10
Junior totals			7	0	2	2	10
