= Mike Johnson (ice hockey) =

Canadian ice hockey player

- Born: October 3, 1974 (age 52) Scarborough, Ontario, Canada
- Height: 6 ft 2 in (188 cm)
- Weight: 201 lb (91 kg; 14 st 5 lb)
- Position: Right wing
- Shot: Right
- Played for: Toronto Maple Leafs; Tampa Bay Lightning; Phoenix Coyotes; Montreal Canadiens; St. Louis Blues; Färjestad BK; Kölner Haie
- National team: Canada
- NHL draft: Undrafted
- Playing career: 1997–2009

Michael Paul Johnson (born October 3, 1974) is a Canadian former professional ice hockey right winger who played in the National Hockey League (NHL) for the Toronto Maple Leafs, Tampa Bay Lightning, Phoenix Coyotes, Montreal Canadiens and the St. Louis Blues.

== Playing career ==
As a youth, Johnson played in the 1988 Quebec International Pee-Wee Hockey Tournament with a minor ice hockey team from Wexford, Toronto.

Undrafted, Johnson was signed right out of college by the Toronto Maple Leafs upon the completion of his senior year at Bowling Green State University. Johnson made his professional debut for the Leafs within days finishing the 1996–97 season. The following year in the 1997–98 season, Johnson was named in the NHL All-Rookie team after compiling a rookie lead tying 47 points. Johnson exceeded his rookie points total in two campaigns with the Phoenix Coyotes.

On July 12, 2006, Johnson was traded to the Montreal Canadiens. The following season, on October 4, 2007, he signed a one-year contract with the St. Louis Blues but only played in 21 games before suffering a season-ending shoulder injury.

Unable to sign with another NHL team, Johnson signed with Kölner Haie of the German DEL for the 2008–09 season, joining former teammate Todd Warriner.

== Broadcasting career ==
Johnson is an analyst for the NHL Network and TSN. He previously served as colour commentator for the Winnipeg Jets, a role he assumed since the beginning of the 2011 season. When Rogers Media won the NHL rights, he moved to Sportsnet to work on national games and he was assigned to his first conference final in 2015, the first of two in a row. Johnson's services were terminated by Rogers Media on August 10, 2016. He re-joined TSN in September 2017.

== Personal life ==
Johnson and his wife have two daughters together.

== Awards and achievements ==
- 1997–98 NHL All-Rookie Team

== Career statistics ==
=== Regular season and playoffs ===
			Regular season					Playoffs
Season	Team	League	GP	G	A	Pts	PIM	GP	G	A	Pts	PIM
1992–93	Aurora Eagles	MetJHL	46	25	39	64	9	7	7	15	22	9
1993–94	Bowling Green State University	CCHA	38	6	14	20	18	—	—	—	—	—
1994–95	Bowling Green State University	CCHA	37	16	33	49	35	—	—	—	—	—
1995–96	Bowling Green State University	CCHA	30	12	19	31	22	—	—	—	—	—
1996–97	Bowling Green State University	CCHA	38	30	32	62	46	—	—	—	—	—
1996–97	Toronto Maple Leafs	NHL	13	2	2	4	4	—	—	—	—	—
1997–98	Toronto Maple Leafs	NHL	82	15	32	47	24	—	—	—	—	—
1998–99	Toronto Maple Leafs	NHL	79	20	24	44	35	17	3	2	5	4
1999–2000	Toronto Maple Leafs	NHL	52	11	14	25	23	—	—	—	—	—
1999–2000	Tampa Bay Lightning	NHL	28	10	12	22	4	—	—	—	—	—
2000–01	Tampa Bay Lightning	NHL	64	11	27	38	38	—	—	—	—	—
2000–01	Phoenix Coyotes	NHL	12	2	3	5	4	—	—	—	—	—
2001–02	Phoenix Coyotes	NHL	57	5	22	27	28	5	1	1	2	6
2002–03	Phoenix Coyotes	NHL	82	23	40	63	47	—	—	—	—	—
2003–04	Phoenix Coyotes	NHL	11	1	9	10	10	—	—	—	—	—
2004–05	Färjestad BK	SEL	8	1	2	3	4	6	0	2	2	4
2005–06	Phoenix Coyotes	NHL	80	16	38	54	50	—	—	—	—	—
2006–07	Montreal Canadiens	NHL	80	11	20	31	40	—	—	—	—	—
2007–08	St. Louis Blues	NHL	21	2	3	5	8	—	—	—	—	—
2008–09	Kölner Haie	DEL	28	4	9	13	52	—	—	—	—	—
NHL totals			661	129	246	375	315	22	4	3	7	10

=== International ===
Year	Team	Event	GP	G	A	Pts	PIM
2000	Canada	WC	9	1	1	2	10
