= Matthew Spiller =

Canadian ice hockey player

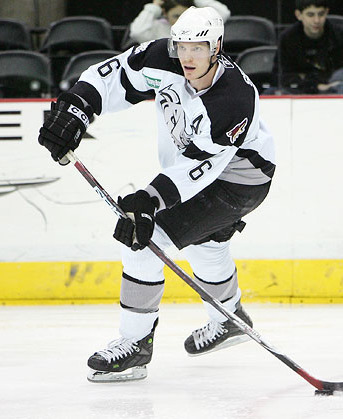
- Spiller with the San Antonio Rampage in 2007
- Born: February 7, 1983 (age 43) Daysland, Alberta, Canada
- Height: 6 ft 5 in (196 cm)
- Weight: 229 lb (104 kg; 16 st 5 lb)
- Position: Defence
- Shot: Left
- Played for: Phoenix Coyotes; New York Islanders; HC Bílí Tygři Liberec
- NHL draft: 31st overall, 2001; Phoenix Coyotes
- Playing career: 2003–2013

Matthew Spiller (born February 7, 1983) is a Canadian former professional ice hockey defenceman who played 68 games in the National Hockey League (NHL) with the Phoenix Coyotes and the New York Islanders. Spiller was originally selected 31st overall by the Coyotes in the 2001 NHL entry draft.

== Playing career ==
Spiller played major junior hockey with the Seattle Thunderbirds in the Western Hockey League. Due to his hulking size and defensive promise, Spiller was selected as the first pick in the second round of the 2001 Entry Draft. In his rookie professional season, Spiller stepped straight into the NHL with the Coyotes in the 2003–04 campaign. Spiller spent the next three seasons within the Coyotes organization, playing primarily with American Hockey League affiliates.

On July 3, 2007, Spiller was signed as a free agent to a one-year deal with the New York Islanders. In the 2007–08 season, he featured in 9 games with the Islanders in what would be his last year in the NHL. Spiller later signed with the New Jersey Devils the following season, but was assigned to AHL affiliate, the Lowell Devils.

As a free agent, Spiller agreed to sign in the Czech Extraliga with HC Bílí Tygři Liberec, however failing to adapt to the European game after 8 games, he returned to the North American minor league ranks in joining the Bloomington PrairieThunder of the Central Hockey League for the 2009–10 season. Spiller spent two years away from professional hockey before attempting a brief comeback in the ECHL with the Florida Everblades in the 2012–13 season.

== Career statistics ==
=== Regular season and playoffs ===
			Regular season					Playoffs
Season	Team	League	GP	G	A	Pts	PIM	GP	G	A	Pts	PIM
1999–2000	Seattle Thunderbirds	WHL	60	1	10	11	106	7	0	0	0	25
2000–01	Seattle Thunderbirds	WHL	71	4	7	11	174	9	1	0	1	22
2001–02	Seattle Thunderbirds	WHL	72	8	23	31	168	1	0	0	0	4
2002–03	Seattle Thunderbirds	WHL	68	11	24	35	198	15	2	7	9	36
2003–04	Phoenix Coyotes	NHL	51	0	0	0	54	—	—	—	—	—
2003–04	Springfield Falcons	AHL	21	1	2	3	32	—	—	—	—	—
2004–05	Utah Grizzlies	AHL	79	4	7	11	160	—	—	—	—	—
2005–06	San Antonio Rampage	AHL	69	2	7	9	167	—	—	—	—	—
2005–06	Phoenix Coyotes	NHL	8	0	1	1	13	—	—	—	—	—
2006–07	San Antonio Rampage	AHL	80	1	7	8	187	—	—	—	—	—
2007–08	Bridgeport Sound Tigers	AHL	75	1	5	6	177	—	—	—	—	—
2007–08	New York Islanders	NHL	9	0	1	1	7	—	—	—	—	—
2008–09	Lowell Devils	AHL	71	2	11	13	90	—	—	—	—	—
2009–10	Bílí Tygři Liberec	ELH	8	0	0	0	8	—	—	—	—	—
2009–10	Bloomington PrairieThunder	IHL	43	8	13	21	124	—	—	—	—	—
2012–13	Florida Everblades	ECHL	2	2	1	3	2	—	—	—	—	—
NHL totals			68	0	2	2	74	—	—	—	—	—
AHL totals			395	11	39	50	813	—	—	—	—	—

=== International ===
Year	Team	Event	GP	G	A	Pts	PIM
2000	Canada	U18	3	0	0	0	6
Junior totals			3	0	0	0	6

== Awards and honours ==
Award	Year
WHL
CHL Top Prospects Game	2001
Best P Plus–minus (+50)	2003
