= 2000–01 NHL season =

National Hockey League season

- League: National Hockey League
- Sport: Ice hockey
- Duration: October 4, 2000 – June 9, 2001
- Games: 82
- Teams: 30
- TV partner(s): CBC, Sportsnet, SRC (Canada); ESPN, ABC (United States)

Draft
- Top draft pick: Rick DiPietro
- Picked by: New York Islanders

Regular season
- Presidents' Trophy: Colorado Avalanche
- Season MVP: Joe Sakic (Avalanche)
- Top scorer: Jaromir Jagr (Penguins)

Playoffs
- Playoffs MVP: Patrick Roy (Avalanche)

Stanley Cup
- Champions: Colorado Avalanche
- Runners-up: New Jersey Devils

NHL seasons
- 1999–2000 2001–02

The 2000–01 NHL season was the 84th regular season of the National Hockey League. With the addition of the expansion Columbus Blue Jackets and the Minnesota Wild, 30 teams each played 82 games. The Stanley Cup winners were the Colorado Avalanche, who won the best of seven series 4–3 against the New Jersey Devils. The focus of Colorado's Stanley Cup run was on star defenceman Ray Bourque, who was on a quest to win his first Stanley Cup championship in his illustrious 22-year career.

== League business ==
=== Expansion ===
Two expansion teams, the Minnesota Wild and the Columbus Blue Jackets, joined the league at the beginning of the season, increasing the number of NHL teams to 30. The Blue Jackets would join the Central Division, while the Wild would join the Northwest Division. This divisional alignment would remain static until the 2012–13 season, while the league did not expand again until the 2017–18 season when the Vegas Golden Knights entered the league. This was the first time the NHL would have a team in Minnesota since the Minnesota North Stars moved to Dallas, Texas in 1993, and the first time for Ohio since the Cleveland Barons merged with the North Stars in 1978.

The 2000 NHL expansion draft was held on June 23, 2000, to fill the rosters of the new expansion teams.

=== Entry draft ===
The 2000 NHL entry draft was held on June 24 and 25, 2000, at the Pengrowth Saddledome in Calgary, Alberta. Rick DiPietro was selected first overall by the New York Islanders.

=== Rule changes ===
The four-official system (two referees and two linesmen) become mandatory for all games. It was previously used for selected regular season games in 1998–99 and 1999–2000, but all playoff games in both of those seasons.

=== Preseason games in Europe ===
This was the first preseason of the NHL Challenge, where selected NHL teams traveled to Europe to play exhibition games against European teams. The Vancouver Canucks traveled to Stockholm Globe Arena in Stockholm, Sweden, to play against Swedish teams MoDo Örnsköldsvik on September 13, 2000, and Djurgården Stockholm on September 15.

== Uniform changes ==
- Buffalo: New Red Alternates.
- Calgary: Previous Black Alternates become the new road uniforms.
- Carolina: Black outline added to players' names.
- Chicago: 75th-anniversary patch.
- Colorado: 2001 NHL All-Star Game Patch.
- Columbus: White Jerseys with red and blue stripes, Blue road jerseys have Red stripe. Team also wears an inaugural season patch. Alt marks are on the shoulders.
- Detroit: 75th-anniversary patch
- Minnesota: White Jerseys with red and green stripes, the Green jerseys have just the red stripe. Alt marks are on the shoulders.
- New York Rangers: 75th-anniversary patch.
- Ottawa: The team introduces a new alternate jersey—this one black with the forward-looking centurion crest.
- Pittsburgh: The Penguins introduce a new alternate jersey, welcoming back the skating penguin and introducing Vegas gold.
- San Jose: 10th Anniversary patch.
- Toronto: Alternates from 1998 to 1999 return, as well as a new TML Patch.
- Washington: Black alternates from 1999 to 2000 become new road uniforms.

== Arenas ==
- The Calgary Flames' home arena, Canadian Airlines Saddledome, was renamed Pengrowth Saddledome as part of a new naming rights agreement with Pengrowth Energy.
- The expansion Columbus Blue Jackets moved into Nationwide Arena, named after the arena's original majority owner, Nationwide Mutual Insurance Company.
- The Dallas Stars played their final season at the Reunion Arena before moving to the American Airlines Center.
- The expansion Minnesota Wild moved into Xcel Energy Center, with Xcel Energy acquiring the naming rights.
- The St. Louis Blues's home arena, the Kiel Center, was renamed the Savvis Center as part of a new naming rights agreement with Savvis.

== Cheerleaders ==
Cheerleaders and Ice Girls were introduced to the league during this season, with the New York Islanders Ice Girls making their debut.

== Regular season ==
=== International games ===
The NHL opened the season in Japan with two games between the Nashville Predators and the Pittsburgh Penguins on October 9 and 10, at Saitama Super Arena in Saitama.

=== All-Star Game ===
The All-Star Game was played on February 4, at the Pepsi Center in Denver, the home of the Colorado Avalanche.

=== Highlights ===
On December 27, 2000, Mario Lemieux returned from his three-and-a-half-year retirement and, in a game nationally televised on Hockey Night in Canada and ESPN National Hockey Night, registered his first assist 33 seconds into the game against the Toronto Maple Leafs. He went on to add a goal and finish with three points, solidifying his return and bringing a struggling Jaromir Jagr back to his elite status, who went on to win his fourth straight Art Ross Trophy, narrowly surpassing Joe Sakic. Despite playing in only 43 games in 2000–01, Lemieux scored 76 points to finish 26th in scoring, finishing the season with the highest points-per-game average that season among NHL players. Lemieux was one of the three finalists for the Hart Memorial Trophy and Lester B. Pearson Award.

The record for most shutouts in a season (set at 160 in 1997–98 and equalled in 1998–99) was eclipsed, as 186 shutouts were recorded.

== Standings ==
=== Eastern Conference ===
Atlantic Division
No.	CR		GP	W	L	T	OTL	GF	GA	Pts
1	1	**New Jersey Devils**	82	48	19	12	3	295	195	111
2	4	**Philadelphia Flyers**	82	43	25	11	3	240	207	100
3	6	**Pittsburgh Penguins**	82	42	28	9	3	281	256	96
4	10	New York Rangers	82	33	43	5	1	250	290	72
5	15	New York Islanders	82	21	51	7	3	185	268	52

Note: CR = Conference rank; GP = Games played; W = Wins; L = Losses; T = Ties; OTL = Overtime loss; GF = Goals for; GA = Goals against; Pts = Points
Bolded teams qualified for the playoffs.

Northeast Division
No.	CR		GP	W	L	T	OTL	GF	GA	Pts
1	2	**Ottawa Senators**	82	48	21	9	4	274	205	109
2	5	**Buffalo Sabres**	82	46	30	5	1	218	184	98
3	7	**Toronto Maple Leafs**	82	37	29	11	5	232	207	90
4	9	Boston Bruins	82	36	30	8	8	227	249	88
5	11	Montreal Canadiens	82	28	40	8	6	206	232	70

Note: CR = Conference rank; GP = Games played; W = Wins; L = Losses; T = Ties; OTL=Overtime loss; GF = Goals for; GA = Goals against; Pts = Points
Bolded teams qualified for the playoffs.

Southeast Division
No.	CR		GP	W	L	T	OTL	GF	GA	Pts
1	3	**Washington Capitals**	82	41	27	10	4	233	211	96
2	8	**Carolina Hurricanes**	82	38	32	9	3	212	225	88
3	12	Florida Panthers	82	22	38	13	9	200	246	66
4	13	Atlanta Thrashers	82	23	45	12	2	211	289	60
5	14	Tampa Bay Lightning	82	24	47	6	5	201	280	59

Note: CR = Conference rank; GP = Games played; W = Wins; L = Losses; T = Ties; OTL = Overtime loss; GF = Goals for; GA = Goals against; Pts = Points
Bolded teams qualified for the playoffs.

Eastern Conference
R		Div	GP	W	L	T	OTL	GF	GA	Pts
**1**	**Z-** New Jersey Devils	**AT**	**82**	**48**	**19**	**12**	**3**	**295**	**195**	111
**2**	**Y-** Ottawa Senators	**NE**	**82**	**48**	**21**	**9**	**4**	**274**	**205**	109
**3**	**Y-** Washington Capitals	**SE**	**82**	**41**	**27**	**10**	**4**	**233**	**211**	96
**4**	**X-** Philadelphia Flyers	**AT**	**82**	**43**	**25**	**11**	**3**	**240**	**207**	100
**5**	**X-** Buffalo Sabres	**NE**	**82**	**46**	**30**	**5**	**1**	**218**	**184**	98
**6**	**X-** Pittsburgh Penguins	**AT**	**82**	**42**	**28**	**9**	**3**	**281**	**256**	96
**7**	**X-** Toronto Maple Leafs	**NE**	**82**	**37**	**29**	**11**	**5**	**232**	**207**	90
**8**	**X-** Carolina Hurricanes	**SE**	**82**	**38**	**32**	**9**	**3**	**212**	**225**	88
8.5
9	Boston Bruins	NE	82	36	30	8	8	227	249	88
10	New York Rangers	AT	82	33	43	5	1	250	290	72
11	Montreal Canadiens	NE	82	28	40	8	6	206	232	70
12	Florida Panthers	SE	82	22	38	13	9	200	246	66
13	Atlanta Thrashers	SE	82	23	45	12	2	211	289	60
14	Tampa Bay Lightning	SE	82	24	47	6	5	201	280	59
15	New York Islanders	AT	82	21	51	7	3	185	268	52

Divisions: AT – Atlantic, NE – Northeast, SE – Southeast

Z – Clinched conference; Y – Clinched division; X – Clinched playoff spot

=== Western Conference ===
Central Division
No.	CR		GP	W	L	T	OTL	GF	GA	Pts
1	2	**Detroit Red Wings**	82	49	20	9	4	253	202	111
2	4	**St. Louis Blues**	82	43	22	12	5	249	195	103
3	10	Nashville Predators	82	34	36	9	3	186	200	80
4	12	Chicago Blackhawks	82	29	40	8	5	210	246	71
5	13	Columbus Blue Jackets	82	28	39	9	6	190	233	71

Note: CR = Conference rank; GP = Games played; W = Wins; L = Losses; T = Ties; OTL = Overtime loss; GF = Goals for; GA = Goals against; Pts = Points
Bolded teams qualified for the playoffs.

Northwest Division
No.	CR		GP	W	L	T	OTL	GF	GA	Pts
1	1	**Colorado Avalanche**	82	52	16	10	4	270	192	118
2	6	**Edmonton Oilers**	82	39	28	12	3	243	222	93
3	8	**Vancouver Canucks**	82	36	28	11	7	239	238	90
4	11	Calgary Flames	82	27	36	15	4	197	236	73
5	14	Minnesota Wild	82	25	39	13	5	168	210	68

Note: CR = Conference rank; GP = Games played; W = Wins; L = Losses; T = Ties; OTL = Overtime loss; GF = Goals for; GA = Goals against; Pts = Points
Bolded teams qualified for the playoffs.

Pacific Division
No.	CR		GP	W	L	T	OTL	GF	GA	Pts
1	3	**Dallas Stars**	82	48	24	8	2	241	187	106
2	5	**San Jose Sharks**	82	40	27	12	3	217	192	95
3	7	**Los Angeles Kings**	82	38	28	13	3	252	228	92
4	9	Phoenix Coyotes	82	35	27	17	3	214	212	90
5	15	Mighty Ducks of Anaheim	82	25	41	11	5	188	245	66

Note: CR = Conference rank; GP = Games played; W = Wins; L = Losses; T = Ties; OTL = Overtime loss; GF = Goals for; GA = Goals against; Pts = Points
Bolded teams qualified for the playoffs.

Western Conference
R		Div	GP	W	L	T	OTL	GF	GA	Pts
**1**	**p – Colorado Avalanche**	**NW**	**82**	**52**	**16**	**10**	**4**	**270**	**192**	**118**
**2**	**y – Detroit Red Wings**	**CEN**	**82**	**49**	**20**	**9**	**4**	**253**	**202**	**111**
**3**	**y – Dallas Stars**	**PAC**	**82**	**48**	**24**	**8**	**2**	**241**	**187**	**106**
**4**	**St. Louis Blues**	**CEN**	**82**	**43**	**22**	**12**	**5**	**249**	**195**	**103**
**5**	**San Jose Sharks**	**PAC**	**82**	**40**	**27**	**12**	**3**	**217**	**192**	**95**
**6**	**Edmonton Oilers**	**NW**	**82**	**39**	**28**	**12**	**3**	**243**	**222**	**93**
**7**	**Los Angeles Kings**	**PAC**	**82**	**38**	**28**	**13**	**3**	**252**	**228**	**92**
**8**	**Vancouver Canucks**	**NW**	**82**	**36**	**28**	**11**	**7**	**239**	**238**	**90**
8.5
9	Phoenix Coyotes	PAC	82	35	27	17	3	214	212	90
10	Nashville Predators	CEN	82	34	36	9	3	186	200	80
11	Calgary Flames	NW	82	27	36	15	4	197	236	73
12	Chicago Blackhawks	CEN	82	29	40	8	5	210	246	71
13	Columbus Blue Jackets	CEN	82	28	39	9	6	190	233	71
14	Minnesota Wild	NW	82	25	39	13	5	168	210	68
15	Mighty Ducks of Anaheim	PAC	82	25	41	11	5	188	245	66

Divisions: CEN – Central, PAC – Pacific, NW – Northwest

bold – Qualified for playoffs; p – Won Presidents' Trophy; y – Won division

== Playoffs ==
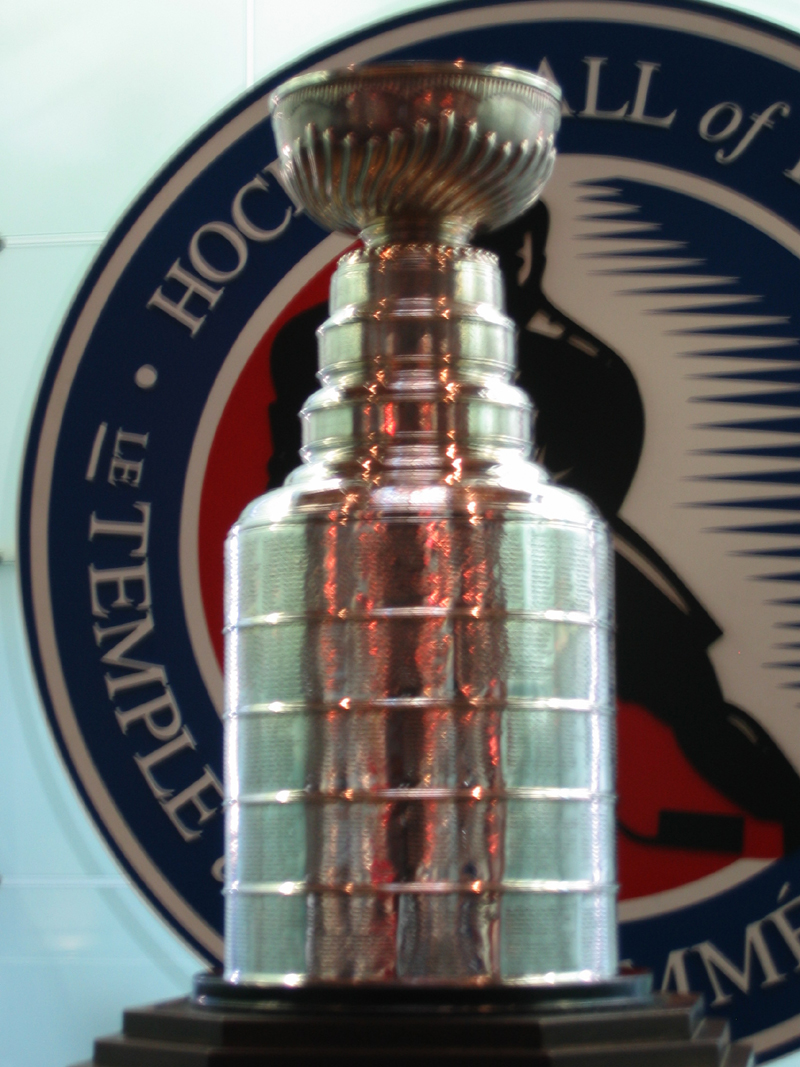
The Stanley Cup

=== Bracket ===
In each round, teams competed in a best-of-seven series following a 2–2–1–1–1 format (scores in the bracket indicate the number of games won in each best-of-seven series). The team with home ice advantage played at home for games one and two (and games five and seven, if necessary), and the other team played at home for games three and four (and game six, if necessary). The top eight teams in each conference made the playoffs, with the three division winners seeded 1–3 based on regular season record, and the five remaining teams seeded 4–8.

The NHL used "re-seeding" instead of a fixed bracket playoff system. During the first three rounds, the highest remaining seed in each conference was matched against the lowest remaining seed, the second-highest remaining seed played the second-lowest remaining seed, and so forth. The higher-seeded team was awarded home ice advantage. The two conference winners then advanced to the Stanley Cup Final, where home ice advantage was awarded to the team that had the better regular season record.

Conference quarterfinals	Conference semifinals
1	New Jersey	4
8	Carolina	2
1	New Jersey	4
7	Toronto	3
2	Ottawa	0
7	Toronto	4
Eastern Conference
3	Washington	2
6	Pittsburgh	4
5	Buffalo	3
6	Pittsburgh	4
4	Philadelphia	2
5	Buffalo	4
1	Colorado	4
8	Vancouver	0
1	Colorado	4
7	Los Angeles	3
2	Detroit	2
7	Los Angeles	4
Western Conference
3	Dallas	4
6	Edmonton	2
3	Dallas	0
4	St. Louis	4
4	St. Louis	4
5	San Jose	2

Conference finals
1	New Jersey	4
6	Pittsburgh	1
1	Colorado	4
4	St. Louis	1

Stanley Cup Final
E1	New Jersey	3
W1	Colorado	4

== Awards ==
The presentation ceremonies were held in Toronto.

2000-01 NHL awards
Award	Recipient(s)	Runner(s)-up/Finalists
Presidents' Trophy (Best regular season record)	Colorado Avalanche	Detroit Red Wings
Prince of Wales Trophy (Eastern Conference playoff champion)	New Jersey Devils	Pittsburgh Penguins
Clarence S. Campbell Bowl (Western Conference playoff champion)	Colorado Avalanche	St. Louis Blues
Art Ross Trophy (Player with most points)	Jaromir Jagr (Pittsburgh Penguins)	Joe Sakic (Colorado Avalanche)
Bill Masterton Memorial Trophy (Perseverance, Sportsmanship, and Dedication)	Adam Graves (New York Rangers)	N/A
Calder Memorial Trophy (Best first-year player)	Evgeni Nabokov (San Jose Sharks)	Martin Havlat (Ottawa Senators); Brad Richards (Tampa Bay Lightning)
Conn Smythe Trophy (Most valuable player, playoffs)	Patrick Roy (Colorado Avalanche)	N/A
Frank J. Selke Trophy (Defensive forward)	John Madden (New Jersey Devils)	Mike Modano (Dallas Stars); Joe Sakic (Colorado Avalanche)
Hart Memorial Trophy (Most valuable player, regular season)	Joe Sakic (Colorado Avalanche)	Jaromir Jagr (Pittsburgh Penguins); Mario Lemieux (Pittsburgh Penguins)
Jack Adams Award (Best coach)	Bill Barber (Philadelphia Flyers)	Scotty Bowman (Detroit Red Wings); Jacques Martin (Ottawa Senators)
James Norris Memorial Trophy (Best defenceman)	Nicklas Lidstrom (Detroit Red Wings)	Ray Bourque (Colorado Avalanche); Scott Stevens (New Jersey Devils)
King Clancy Memorial Trophy (Leadership and humanitarian contribution)	Shjon Podein (Colorado Avalanche)	N/A
Lady Byng Memorial Trophy (Sportsmanship and excellence)	Joe Sakic (Colorado Avalanche)	Nicklas Lidstrom (Detroit Red Wings); Adam Oates (Washington Capitals)
Lester B. Pearson Award (Outstanding player)	Joe Sakic (Colorado Avalanche)	N/A
Maurice "Rocket" Richard Trophy (Top goal-scorer)	Pavel Bure (Florida Panthers)	Joe Sakic (Colorado Avalanche)
NHL Foundation Player Award (Community enrichment and involvement)	Olaf Kolzig (Washington Capitals)	
NHL Plus-Minus Award (Player with the best plus-minus)	Patrik Elias (New Jersey Devils); Joe Sakic (Colorado Avalanche)	Scott Stevens (New Jersey Devils)
Roger Crozier Saving Grace Award (Goaltender with the best save percentage)	Marty Turco (Dallas Stars)	Mike Dunham (Nashville Predators)
Vezina Trophy (Best goaltender)	Dominik Hasek (Buffalo Sabres)	Martin Brodeur (New Jersey Devils); Roman Cechmanek (Philadelphia Flyers)
William M. Jennings Trophy (Goaltender(s) of team with fewest goals against)	Dominik Hasek (Buffalo Sabres)	N/A

=== All-Star teams ===
First Team	Position	Second Team
Dominik Hasek, Buffalo Sabres	G	Roman Cechmanek, Philadelphia Flyers
Nicklas Lidstrom, Detroit Red Wings	D	Rob Blake, L.A./Colorado
Ray Bourque, Colorado Avalanche	D	Scott Stevens, New Jersey Devils
Joe Sakic, Colorado Avalanche	C	Mario Lemieux, Pittsburgh Penguins
Jaromir Jagr, Pittsburgh Penguins	RW	Pavel Bure, Florida Panthers
Patrik Elias, New Jersey Devils	LW	Luc Robitaille, Los Angeles Kings

== Coaches ==
=== Eastern Conference ===
- Atlanta Thrashers: Curt Fraser
- Boston Bruins: Pat Burns and Mike Keenan
- Buffalo Sabres: Lindy Ruff
- Carolina Hurricanes: Paul Maurice
- Florida Panthers: Terry Murray and Duane Sutter
- Montreal Canadiens: Alain Vigneault and Michel Therrien
- New Jersey Devils: Larry Robinson
- New York Islanders: Butch Goring and Lorne Henning
- New York Rangers: Ron Low
- Ottawa Senators: Jacques Martin
- Philadelphia Flyers: Craig Ramsay and Bill Barber
- Pittsburgh Penguins: Ivan Hlinka
- Tampa Bay Lightning: Steve Ludzik and John Tortorella
- Toronto Maple Leafs: Pat Quinn
- Washington Capitals: Ron Wilson

=== Western Conference ===
- Mighty Ducks of Anaheim: Craig Hartsburg and Guy Charron
- Calgary Flames: Don Hay and Greg Gilbert
- Chicago Blackhawks: Alpo Suhonen
- Colorado Avalanche: Bob Hartley
- Columbus Blue Jackets: Dave King
- Dallas Stars: Ken Hitchcock
- Detroit Red Wings: Scotty Bowman
- Edmonton Oilers: Craig MacTavish
- Los Angeles Kings: Andy Murray
- Minnesota Wild: Jacques Lemaire
- Nashville Predators: Barry Trotz
- Phoenix Coyotes: Bobby Francis
- San Jose Sharks: Darryl Sutter
- St. Louis Blues: Joel Quenneville
- Vancouver Canucks: Marc Crawford

== Player statistics ==
=== Regular season ===
==== Scoring leaders ====
Note: GP = Games played; G = Goals; A = Assists; Pts = Points

Player	Team	GP	G	A	Pts
Jaromir Jagr	Pittsburgh	81	52	69	121
Joe Sakic	Colorado	82	54	64	118
Patrik Elias	New Jersey	82	40	56	96
Alexei Kovalev	Pittsburgh	79	44	51	95
Jason Allison	Boston	82	36	59	95
Martin Straka	Pittsburgh	82	27	68	95
Pavel Bure	Florida	82	59	33	92
Doug Weight	Edmonton	82	25	65	90
Zigmund Palffy	Los Angeles	73	38	51	89
Peter Forsberg	Colorado	73	27	62	89

=== Leading goaltenders ===
Note: GP = Games played; Min = Minutes Played; GA = Goals against; GAA = Goals against average; W = Wins; L = Losses; T = Ties; SO = Shutouts; SV% = Save percentage

Player	Team	GP	MIN	GA	GAA	W	L	T	SO	SV%
Roman Cechmanek	Philadelphia	59	3431	115	2.01	35	15	6	10	.921
Manny Legace	Detroit	39	2136	73	2.05	24	5	5	2	.920
Dominik Hasek	Buffalo	67	3904	137	2.11	37	24	4	11	.915
Evgeni Nabokov	San Jose	66	3699	135	2.19	32	21	7	6	.931
Patrick Roy	Colorado	62	3584	132	2.21	40	13	7	4	.913
Manny Fernandez	Minnesota	42	2460	92	2.24	19	17	4	4	.920
Sean Burke	Phoenix	62	3643	138	2.27	25	22	13	4	.922
Roman Turek	St. Louis	54	3232	123	2.28	24	18	10	6	.901
Mike Dunham	Nashville	48	2810	107	2.28	21	21	4	4	.923
Martin Brodeur	New Jersey	72	4296	166	2.32	42	17	11	9	.915

=== Playoffs ===
==== Scoring leaders ====
Note: GP = Games played; G = Goals; A = Assists; Pts = Points

Player	Team	GP	G	A	Pts
Joe Sakic	Colorado Avalanche	21	13	13	26
Patrik Elias	New Jersey Devils	25	9	14	23
Milan Hejduk	Colorado Avalanche	23	7	16	23
Petr Sykora	New Jersey Devils	25	10	12	22
Alex Tanguay	Colorado Avalanche	23	6	15	21
Rob Blake	Colorado Avalanche	23	6	13	19
Brian Rafalski	New Jersey Devils	25	7	11	18
Mario Lemieux	Pittsburgh Penguins	18	6	11	17
Chris Drury	Colorado Avalanche	23	11	5	16
Bobby Holik	New Jersey Devils	25	6	10	16
Alexander Mogilny	New Jersey Devils	25	5	11	16

== Milestones ==
=== Debuts ===
The following is a list of players of note who played their first NHL game in 2000–01:

- Andrew Raycroft, Boston Bruins
- Marty Turco, Dallas Stars
- Eric Belanger, Los Angeles Kings
- Andreas Lilja, Los Angeles Kings
- Lubomir Visnovsky, Los Angeles Kings
- Marian Gaborik, Minnesota Wild
- Lubomir Sekeras, Minnesota Wild
- Rick DiPietro, New York Islanders
- Martin Havlat, Ottawa Senators
- Miikka Kiprusoff, San Jose Sharks
- Brad Richards, Tampa Bay Lightning
- Henrik Sedin, Vancouver Canucks
- Daniel Sedin, Vancouver Canucks

=== Last games ===
The following is a list of players of note who played their last NHL game in 2000–01, listed with their team:

Player	Team	Notability
Ray Bourque	Colorado Avalanche	16-time NHL All-Star, 4-time James Norris Memorial Trophy winner, Calder Memorial Trophy winner, King Clancy Memorial Trophy winner, Lester Patrick Trophy winner, over 1600 games played.
Paul Coffey	Boston Bruins	14-time NHL All-Star, 3-time James Norris Memorial Trophy winner, over 1400 games played.
Garry Galley	New York Islanders	2-time NHL All-Star, over 1100 games played.
Tony Granato	San Jose Sharks	Bill Masterton Memorial Trophy winner, 1-time NHL All-Star.
Kevin Hatcher	Carolina Hurricanes	5-time NHL All-Star, over 1100 games played.
Kris King	Chicago Blackhawks	King Clancy Memorial Trophy winner.
Kirk McLean	New York Rangers	2-time NHL All-Star.
Larry Murphy	Detroit Red Wings	3-time NHL All-Star, over 1600 games played.
Ron Sutter	Calgary Flames	Over 1000 games played, the last active Sutter brother to play in NHL.
Petr Svoboda	Tampa Bay Lightning	Over 1000 games played.

== Broadcasting ==
=== Canada ===
This was the third season of the league's Canadian national broadcast rights deals with CBC and the renamed Sportsnet (the latter was sold by CTV after acquiring rival TSN). CBC aired Saturday night Hockey Night in Canada regular season games, while Sportsnet's telecasts included Tuesday Night Hockey and other weeknight games. Coverage of the Stanley Cup playoffs continued to primarily be on CBC, while Sportsnet aired first round all-U.S. series.

=== United States ===
This was the second year of the league's five-year U.S. national broadcast rights deal with ESPN and ABC. ESPN and ESPN2 aired weeknight games throughout the regular season. ABC's coverage included the All-Star Game and then five weeks worth of regional games on Saturday afternoons between March and April. During the first two rounds of the playoffs, ESPN and ESPN2 aired selected games, while ABC had Saturday regional telecasts. Each U.S. team's regional broadcaster produced local coverage of first and second-round games (except for those games on ABC). ABC's weekend telecasts continued into the Conference Finals, while ESPN had the rest of the third-round games. ESPN then aired the first two games of the Stanley Cup Final before the rest of the series shifted to ABC.

== See also ==
- 2000 in sports
- 2000 NHL entry draft
- 2000 NHL expansion draft
- 2000-01 NHL transactions
- 2001 in sports
- 51st National Hockey League All-Star Game
- NHL All-Rookie Team
- NHL All-Star Game
- Lester Patrick Trophy
