= 2002–03 Boston Bruins season =

NHL team season

2002–03 Boston Bruins
- Division: 3rd Northeast
- Conference: 7th Eastern
- 2002–03 record: 36–31–11–4
- Home record: 23–11–5–2
- Road record: 13–20–6–2
- Goals for: 245
- Goals against: 237

Team information
- General manager: Mike O'Connell
- Coach: Robbie Ftorek (Oct.–Mar.); Mike O'Connell (Mar.–Apr.)
- Captain: Joe Thornton
- Alternate captains: Martin Lapointe; Don Sweeney
- Arena: Fleet Center
- Average attendance: 15,029 (85.6%)
- Minor league affiliate: Providence Bruins

Team leaders
- Goals: Glen Murray (44)
- Assists: Joe Thornton (65)
- Points: Joe Thornton (101)
- Penalty minutes: P. J. Stock (160)
- Plus/minus: Hal Gill (+21)
- Wins: Steve Shields (12)
- Goals against average: John Grahame (2.71)

The 2002–03 Boston Bruins season was the team's 79th season of operation.

== Offseason ==
Joe Thornton was named the 17th captain in team history on October 8, 2002.

== Regular season ==
Head coach Robbie Ftorek was fired on March 19 and general manager Mike O'Connell assumed coaching duties on an interim basis through the end of the season.

=== Final standings ===
Northeast Division
No.	CR		GP	W	L	T	OTL	GF	GA	Pts
1	1	**Ottawa Senators**	82	52	21	8	1	263	182	113
2	5	**Toronto Maple Leafs**	82	44	28	7	3	236	208	98
3	7	**Boston Bruins**	82	36	31	11	4	245	237	87
4	10	Montreal Canadiens	82	30	35	8	9	206	234	77
5	12	Buffalo Sabres	82	27	37	10	8	190	219	72

Note: CR = Conference rank; GP = Games played; W = Wins; L = Losses; T = Ties; OTL = Overtime loss; GF = Goals for; GA = Goals against; Pts = Points
Bolded teams qualified for the playoffs.

Eastern Conference
R		Div	GP	W	L	T	OTL	GF	GA	Pts
**1**	**P-** Ottawa Senators	**NE**	**82**	**52**	**21**	**8**	**1**	**263**	**182**	113
**2**	**Y-** New Jersey Devils	**AT**	**82**	**46**	**20**	**10**	**6**	**216**	**166**	108
**3**	**Y-** Tampa Bay Lightning	**SE**	**82**	**36**	**25**	**16**	**5**	**219**	**210**	93
**4**	**X-** Philadelphia Flyers	**AT**	**82**	**45**	**20**	**13**	**4**	**211**	**166**	107
**5**	**X-** Toronto Maple Leafs	**NE**	**82**	**44**	**28**	**7**	**3**	**236**	**208**	98
**6**	**X-** Washington Capitals	**SE**	**82**	**39**	**29**	**8**	**6**	**224**	**220**	92
**7**	**X-** Boston Bruins	**NE**	**82**	**36**	**31**	**11**	**4**	**245**	**237**	87
**8**	**X-** New York Islanders	**AT**	**82**	**35**	**34**	**11**	**2**	**224**	**231**	83
8.5
9	New York Rangers	AT	82	32	36	10	4	210	231	78
10	Montreal Canadiens	NE	82	30	35	8	9	206	234	77
11	Atlanta Thrashers	SE	82	31	39	7	5	226	284	74
12	Buffalo Sabres	NE	82	27	37	10	8	190	219	72
13	Florida Panthers	SE	82	24	36	13	9	176	237	70
14	Pittsburgh Penguins	AT	82	27	44	6	5	189	255	65
15	Carolina Hurricanes	SE	82	22	43	11	6	171	240	61

Divisions: AT – Atlantic, NE – Northeast, SE – Southeast

P – Clinched Presidents Trophy; Y – Clinched division; X – Clinched playoff spot

== Schedule and results ==
=== Regular season ===
2002–03 regular season
October: 6–2–2–0 (home: 1–1–1–0; road: 5–1–1–0)

Game	Date	Score	Opponent	Record	Recap
1	October 11, 2002	1–5	@ Minnesota Wild (2002–03)	0–1–0–0	L
2	October 14, 2002	2–1	@ Colorado Avalanche (2002–03)	1–1–0–0	W
3	October 16, 2002	6–3	@ Vancouver Canucks (2002–03)	2–1–0–0	W
4	October 17, 2002	3–3 OT	@ Calgary Flames (2002–03)	2–1–1–0	T
5	October 19, 2002	4–3	@ Edmonton Oilers (2002–03)	3–1–1–0	W
6	October 21, 2002	4–1	@ Toronto Maple Leafs (2002–03)	4–1–1–0	W
7	October 24, 2002	2–2 OT	Ottawa Senators (2002–03)	4–1–2–0	T
8	October 26, 2002	4–3	Atlanta Thrashers (2002–03)	5–1–2–0	W
9	October 30, 2002	7–2	@ Washington Capitals (2002–03)	6–1–2–0	W
10	October 31, 2002	1–4	Mighty Ducks of Anaheim (2002–03)	6–2–2–0	L

November: 10–1–1–1 (home: 8–0–0–0; road: 2–1–1–1)

Game	Date	Score	Opponent	Record	Recap
11	November 2, 2002	3–2	New York Rangers (2002–03)	7–2–2–0	W
12	November 7, 2002	1–2 OT	@ Detroit Red Wings (2002–03)	7–2–2–1	OTL
13	November 9, 2002	7–1	Ottawa Senators (2002–03)	8–2–2–1	W
14	November 11, 2002	6–1	Edmonton Oilers (2002–03)	9–2–2–1	W
15	November 12, 2002	4–3	@ Buffalo Sabres (2002–03)	10–2–2–1	W
16	November 14, 2002	4–1	New York Islanders (2002–03)	11–2–2–1	W
17	November 16, 2002	2–2 OT	@ Philadelphia Flyers (2002–03)	11–2–3–1	T
18	November 19, 2002	0–2	@ Toronto Maple Leafs (2002–03)	11–3–3–1	L
19	November 21, 2002	3–1	Carolina Hurricanes (2002–03)	12–3–3–1	W
20	November 23, 2002	4–1	Buffalo Sabres (2002–03)	13–3–3–1	W
21	November 26, 2002	7–2	Calgary Flames (2002–03)	14–3–3–1	W
22	November 29, 2002	4–2	Montreal Canadiens (2002–03)	15–3–3–1	W
23	November 30, 2002	3–2	@ Pittsburgh Penguins (2002–03)	16–3–3–1	W

December: 5–8–1–0 (home: 3–4–1–0; road: 2–4–0–0)

Game	Date	Score	Opponent	Record	Recap
24	December 3, 2002	0–4	St. Louis Blues (2002–03)	16–4–3–1	L
25	December 5, 2002	4–3 OT	Atlanta Thrashers (2002–03)	17–4–3–1	W
26	December 7, 2002	3–2 OT	Tampa Bay Lightning (2002–03)	18–4–3–1	W
27	December 8, 2002	4–1	@ New York Rangers (2002–03)	19–4–3–1	W
28	December 10, 2002	2–4	Montreal Canadiens (2002–03)	19–5–3–1	L
29	December 12, 2002	2–5	Ottawa Senators (2002–03)	19–6–3–1	L
30	December 14, 2002	2–4	@ Montreal Canadiens (2002–03)	19–7–3–1	L
31	December 18, 2002	2–4	@ Buffalo Sabres (2002–03)	19–8–3–1	L
32	December 19, 2002	3–5	@ Washington Capitals (2002–03)	19–9–3–1	L
33	December 21, 2002	3–3 OT	Florida Panthers (2002–03)	19–9–4–1	T
34	December 23, 2002	5–2	San Jose Sharks (2002–03)	20–9–4–1	W
35	December 27, 2002	2–5	@ Tampa Bay Lightning (2002–03)	20–10–4–1	L
36	December 28, 2002	1–0	@ Atlanta Thrashers (2002–03)	21–10–4–1	W
37	December 30, 2002	0–1	New Jersey Devils (2002–03)	21–11–4–1	L

January: 5–8–1–0 (home: 4–3–1–0; road: 1–5–0–0)

Game	Date	Score	Opponent	Record	Recap
38	January 3, 2003	4–8	@ New York Islanders (2002–03)	21–12–4–1	L
39	January 4, 2003	2–4	Carolina Hurricanes (2002–03)	21–13–4–1	L
40	January 7, 2003	2–5	@ Toronto Maple Leafs (2002–03)	21–14–4–1	L
41	January 10, 2003	2–4	@ Buffalo Sabres (2002–03)	21–15–4–1	L
42	January 11, 2003	6–2	Toronto Maple Leafs (2002–03)	22–15–4–1	W
43	January 13, 2003	1–2	Pittsburgh Penguins (2002–03)	22–16–4–1	L
44	January 15, 2003	0–3	@ Florida Panthers (2002–03)	22–17–4–1	L
45	January 17, 2003	1–3	@ Atlanta Thrashers (2002–03)	22–18–4–1	L
46	January 18, 2003	7–2	Columbus Blue Jackets (2002–03)	23–18–4–1	W
47	January 20, 2003	3–3 OT	Washington Capitals (2002–03)	23–18–5–1	T
48	January 23, 2003	4–1	@ Pittsburgh Penguins (2002–03)	24–18–5–1	W
49	January 25, 2003	1–0 OT	Philadelphia Flyers (2002–03)	25–18–5–1	W
50	January 28, 2003	2–1	Nashville Predators (2002–03)	26–18–5–1	W
51	January 30, 2003	1–3	Chicago Blackhawks (2002–03)	26–19–5–1	L

February: 2–6–3–1 (home: 1–1–1–1; road: 1–5–2–0)

Game	Date	Score	Opponent	Record	Recap
52	February 4, 2003	2–3 OT	Colorado Avalanche (2002–03)	26–19–5–2	OTL
53	February 6, 2003	6–3	Montreal Canadiens (2002–03)	27–19–5–2	W
54	February 8, 2003	2–5	Pittsburgh Penguins (2002–03)	27–20–5–2	L
55	February 11, 2003	1–3	@ Montreal Canadiens (2002–03)	27–21–5–2	L
56	February 14, 2003	6–5 OT	@ Florida Panthers (2002–03)	28–21–5–2	W
57	February 15, 2003	2–5	@ Tampa Bay Lightning (2002–03)	28–22–5–2	L
58	February 17, 2003	1–5	@ Nashville Predators (2002–03)	28–23–5–2	L
59	February 19, 2003	1–1 OT	@ Carolina Hurricanes (2002–03)	28–23–6–2	T
60	February 21, 2003	2–3	@ New Jersey Devils (2002–03)	28–24–6–2	L
61	February 23, 2003	4–4 OT	@ New York Islanders (2002–03)	28–24–7–2	T
62	February 25, 2003	5–5 OT	Dallas Stars (2002–03)	28–24–8–2	T
63	February 27, 2003	1–4	@ New York Rangers (2002–03)	28–25–8–2	L

March: 7–5–2–2 (home: 5–2–1–1; road: 2–3–1–1)

Game	Date	Score	Opponent	Record	Recap
64	March 1, 2003	2–3 OT	Philadelphia Flyers (2002–03)	28–25–8–3	OTL
65	March 3, 2003	4–6	Vancouver Canucks (2002–03)	28–26–8–3	L
66	March 4, 2003	4–2	@ Carolina Hurricanes (2002–03)	29–26–8–3	W
67	March 6, 2003	4–1	New York Islanders (2002–03)	30–26–8–3	W
68	March 8, 2003	5–4 OT	Washington Capitals (2002–03)	31–26–8–3	W
69	March 9, 2003	5–8	@ Chicago Blackhawks (2002–03)	31–27–8–3	L
70	March 11, 2003	3–4 OT	@ Ottawa Senators (2002–03)	31–27–8–4	OTL
71	March 13, 2003	4–3	New Jersey Devils (2002–03)	32–27–8–4	W
72	March 15, 2003	4–1	Florida Panthers (2002–03)	33–27–8–4	W
73	March 18, 2003	1–2	@ Phoenix Coyotes (2002–03)	33–28–8–4	L
74	March 21, 2003	2–3	@ San Jose Sharks (2002–03)	33–29–8–4	L
75	March 22, 2003	4–3 OT	@ Los Angeles Kings (2002–03)	34–29–8–4	W
76	March 24, 2003	3–2	Toronto Maple Leafs (2002–03)	35–29–8–4	W
77	March 27, 2003	2–2 OT	@ Philadelphia Flyers (2002–03)	35–29–9–4	T
78	March 29, 2003	1–3	New York Rangers (2002–03)	35–30–9–4	L
79	March 31, 2003	2–2 OT	Tampa Bay Lightning (2002–03)	35–30–10–4	T

April: 1–1–1–0 (home: 1–0–0–0; road: 0–1–1–0)

Game	Date	Score	Opponent	Record	Recap
80	April 1, 2003	2–3	@ Ottawa Senators (2002–03)	35–31–10–4	L
81	April 3, 2003	1–1 OT	@ New Jersey Devils (2002–03)	35–31–11–4	T
82	April 5, 2003	8–5	Buffalo Sabres (2002–03)	36–31–11–4	W

Legend: W Win (2 points) L Loss (0 points) T Tie (1 point) OTL Overtime loss (1 point)

=== Playoffs ===
2003 Stanley Cup playoffs
Eastern Conference Quarterfinals vs. (2) New Jersey Devils – Devils win 4–1

Game	Date	Score	Opponent	Series	Recap
1	April 9, 2003	1–2	@ New Jersey Devils	Devils lead 1–0	L
2	April 11, 2003	2–4	@ New Jersey Devils	Devils lead 2–0	L
3	April 13, 2003	0–3	New Jersey Devils	Devils lead 3–0	L
4	April 15, 2003	5–1	New Jersey Devils	Devils lead 3–1	W
5	April 17, 2003	0–3	@ New Jersey Devils	Devils win 4–1	L

Legend: W Win L Loss

== Player statistics ==
=== Scoring ===
- Position abbreviations: C = Center; D = Defense; G = Goaltender; LW = Left wing; RW = Right wing
- † = Joined team via a transaction (e.g., trade, waivers, signing) during the season. Stats reflect time with the Bruins only.
- ‡ = Left team via a transaction (e.g., trade, waivers, release) during the season. Stats reflect time with the Bruins only.

No.	Player	Pos	Regular season						Playoffs					
No.	Player	Pos	GP	G	A	Pts	+/-	PIM	GP	G	A	Pts	+/-	PIM
19	Joe Thornton	C	77	36	65	101	12	109	5	1	2	3	−5	4
27	Glen Murray	RW	82	44	48	92	9	64	5	1	1	2	−5	4
26	Mike Knuble	RW	75	30	29	59	18	45	5	0	2	2	−2	2
12	Brian Rolston	C	81	27	32	59	1	32	5	0	2	2	−1	0
16	Jozef Stumpel	C	78	14	37	51	0	12	5	0	2	2	0	0
34	Bryan Berard	D	80	10	28	38	−4	64	3	1	0	1	−1	2
11	P. J. Axelsson	LW	66	17	19	36	8	24	5	0	0	0	−2	6
44	Nick Boynton	D	78	7	17	24	8	99	5	0	1	1	−2	4
46	Jonathan Girard	D	73	6	16	22	4	21	2	0	1	1	−1	0
22	Michal Grosek	LW	63	2	18	20	2	71	5	0	0	0	−1	13
10	Marty McInnis	RW	77	9	10	19	−11	38	5	1	0	1	1	2
20	Martin Lapointe	RW	59	8	10	18	−19	87	5	1	0	1	−2	14
36	Ivan Huml	LW	41	6	11	17	3	30	—	—	—	—	—	—
25	Hal Gill	D	76	4	13	17	21	56	5	0	0	0	−1	4
17	Rob Zamuner	LW	55	10	6	16	2	18	5	0	0	0	0	4
21	Sean O'Donnell	D	70	1	15	16	8	76	—	—	—	—	—	—
14	Sergei Samsonov	LW	8	5	6	11	8	2	5	0	2	2	−1	0
42	P. J. Stock	C	71	1	9	10	−5	160	—	—	—	—	—	—
32	Don Sweeney	D	67	3	5	8	−1	24	5	0	1	1	0	0
23	Sean Brown	D	69	1	5	6	−6	117	—	—	—	—	—	—
37	Lee Goren	RW	14	2	1	3	−2	7	5	0	0	0	−1	5
29	Andy Hilbert	C	14	0	3	3	−1	7	—	—	—	—	—	—
47	John Grahame‡	G	23	0	2	2		2	—	—	—	—	—	—
39	Zdenek Kutlak	D	4	1	0	1	0	0	—	—	—	—	—	—
76	Kris Vernarsky	C	14	1	0	1	−2	2	—	—	—	—	—	—
59	Rich Brennan	D	7	0	1	1	3	6	—	—	—	—	—	—
6	Dan McGillis†	D	10	0	1	1	2	10	5	3	0	3	−2	2
18	Ian Moran†	D	8	0	1	1	−1	2	5	0	1	1	−2	4
43	Martin Samuelsson	RW	8	0	1	1	−1	2	—	—	—	—	—	—
30	Jeff Hackett†	G	18	0	0	0		2	3	0	0	0		0
63	Matt Herr	C	3	0	0	0	0	0	—	—	—	—	—	—
64	Jarno Kultanen	D	2	0	0	0	1	0	—	—	—	—	—	—
28	Shaone Morrisonn	D	11	0	0	0	0	8	—	—	—	—	—	—
55	Brantt Myhres	RW	1	0	0	0	0	31	—	—	—	—	—	—
33	Krzysztof Oliwa†	LW	33	0	0	0	−4	110	—	—	—	—	—	—
1	Andrew Raycroft	G	5	0	0	0		0	—	—	—	—	—	—
31	Steve Shields	G	36	0	0	0		8	2	0	0	0		0
70	Tim Thomas	G	4	0	0	0		0	—	—	—	—	—	—

=== Goaltending ===
- † = Joined team via a transaction (e.g., trade, waivers, signing) during the season. Stats reflect time with the Bruins only.
- ‡ = Left team via a transaction (e.g., trade, waivers, release) during the season. Stats reflect time with the Bruins only.

No.	Player	Regular season										Playoffs								
No.	Player	GP	W	L	T	SA	GA	GAA	SV%	SO	TOI	GP	W	L	SA	GA	GAA	SV%	SO	TOI
31	Steve Shields	36	12	13	9	930	97	2.76	.896	0	2112	2	0	2	58	6	3.03	.897	0	119
47	John Grahame‡	23	11	9	2	625	61	2.71	.902	1	1352	—	—	—	—	—	—	—	—	—
30	Jeff Hackett†	18	8	9	0	500	53	3.21	.894	1	991	3	1	2	76	5	1.68	.934	0	179
70	Tim Thomas	4	3	1	0	118	11	3.00	.907	0	220	—	—	—	—	—	—	—	—	—
1	Andrew Raycroft	5	2	3	0	146	12	2.40	.918	0	300	—	—	—	—	—	—	—	—	—

== Awards and records ==
=== Awards ===
Type	Award/honor	Recipient	Ref
League (annual)	Lester Patrick Trophy	Ray Bourque	
League (annual)	Lester Patrick Trophy	Willie O'Ree	
League (annual)	NHL Second All-Star Team	Joe Thornton (Center)	
League (in-season)	NHL All-Star Game selection	Glen Murray	
League (in-season)	NHL All-Star Game selection	Joe Thornton	
League (in-season)	NHL Player of the Week	Joe Thornton (December 2)	
Team	Elizabeth C. Dufresne Trophy	Joe Thornton	
Team	John P. Bucyk Award	Nick Boynton	
Team	Seventh Player Award	Mike Knuble	
Team	Three Stars Awards	Joe Thornton (1st)	
Team	Three Stars Awards	Glen Murray (2nd)	
Team	Three Stars Awards	Mike Knuble (3rd)	

=== Milestones ===
Milestone	Player	Date	Ref
First game	Tim Thomas	October 19, 2002	
First game	Shaone Morrisonn	November 19, 2002	
First game	Martin Samuelsson	January 15, 2003	
First game	Kris Vernarsky	January 20, 2003	
1,000th game played	Don Sweeney	November 14, 2002	

== Transactions ==
The Bruins were involved in the following transactions from June 14, 2002, the day after the deciding game of the 2002 Stanley Cup Finals, through June 9, 2003, the day of the deciding game of the 2003 Stanley Cup Finals.

=== Trades ===
Date	Details		Ref
June 22, 2002	To Boston Bruins: 2nd-round pick in 2002	To St. Louis Blues: 2nd-round pick in 2002; 5th-round pick in 2002	
June 25, 2002	To Boston Bruins: Steve Shields	To Anaheim Mighty Ducks: 3rd-round pick in 2003	
January 6, 2003	To Boston Bruins: Krzysztof Oliwa	To New York Rangers: 9th-round pick in 2004	
January 13, 2003	To Boston Bruins: 4th-round pick in 2004	To Tampa Bay Lightning: John Grahame	
January 17, 2003	To Boston Bruins: Boston’s 9th-round pick in 2004	To New York Rangers: Jay Henderson	
January 23, 2003	To Boston Bruins: Jeff Hackett; Jeff Jillson	To San Jose Sharks: Kyle McLaren; 4th-round pick in 2004	
March 11, 2003	To Boston Bruins: Dan McGillis	To San Jose Sharks: 2nd-round pick in 2003	
March 11, 2003	To Boston Bruins: Ian Moran	To Pittsburgh Penguins: 4th-round pick in 2003	
May 31, 2003	To Boston Bruins: 5th-round pick in 2004	To Phoenix Coyotes: Rights to Darren McLachlan	

=== Players acquired ===
Date	Player	Former team	Term	Via	Ref
July 16, 2002	Michal Grosek	New York Rangers	1-year	Free agency	
July 18, 2002	Bill Bowler	Nashville Predators	1-year	Free agency	
July 18, 2002	Rich Brennan	Los Angeles Kings	2-year	Free agency	
July 18, 2002	Kevin Dallman	Guelph Storm (OHL)	3-year	Free agency	
July 18, 2002	Matt Herr	Florida Panthers	2-year	Free agency	
July 18, 2002	Martin Wilde (Note: The contract was canceled since Wilde had never been drafted in the NHL entry draft. Wilde signed with Modo Hockey on September 4.)	Providence Bruins (AHL)	1-year	Free agency	
July 29, 2002	Darren Van Oene	Buffalo Sabres	1-year (Note: Club option for a second year.)	Free agency	
August 6, 2002	Chris Paradise	University of Denver (WCHA)	2-year	Free agency	
August 13, 2002	Bryan Berard	New York Rangers	1-year	Free agency	
September 18, 2002	Brantt Myhres	Washington Capitals		Free agency	

=== Players lost ===
Date	Player	New team	Via (Note: In parentheses is the player's free agency group on July 1 if applicable.)	Ref
N/A	Vratislav Cech	HC Havirov (ELH)	Free agency (UFA)	
July 3, 2002	Bill Guerin	Dallas Stars	Free agency (III)	
July 9, 2002	Tony Tuzzolino	Minnesota Wild	Free agency (VI)	
July 19, 2002	Eric Manlow	New York Islanders	Free agency (VI)	
August 12, 2002	Jeff Maund	Metallurg Magnitogorsk (RSL)	Free agency (VI)	
August 23, 2002	Pavel Kolarik	HC Slavia Praha (ELH)	Free agency (UFA)	
August 26, 2002	Dennis Bonvie	Ottawa Senators	Free agency (UFA)	
August 26, 2002	Jeff Norton	Frisk Asker (Eliteserien)	Free agency (III)	
August 28, 2002	Darryl Laplante	Augusta Lynx (ECHL)	Free agency (VI)	
N/A	Jeff Zehr	Hamilton Bulldogs (AHL)	Free agency (UFA)	
October 30, 2002	Eric Van Acker	Greenville Grrrowl (ECHL)	Free agency (UFA)	
November 2, 2002	Jamie Rivers	San Antonio Rampage (AHL)	Free agency (UFA)	
November 19, 2002	Byron Dafoe	Atlanta Thrashers	Free agency (III)	
November 25, 2002	John Emmons	Eisbaren Berlin (DEL)	Free agency (UFA)	
May 19, 2003	Jarno Kultanen	HIFK (Liiga)	Free agency (Note: Boston retained Kultanen's NHL rights through the 2005–06 season.)	

=== Signings ===
Date	Player	Term	Contract type	Ref
June 18, 2002	Martin Samuelsson	3-year	Entry-level	
June 25, 2002	Steve Shields	2-year	Re-signing	
June 30, 2002	P. J. Stock	1-year	Option exercised	
June 30, 2002	Tim Thomas	1-year	Option exercised	
July 8, 2002	Shaone Morrisonn	3-year	Entry-level	
July 10, 2002	Mike Knuble	2-year	Re-signing	
July 16, 2002	Nick Boynton	1-year	Re-signing	
July 16, 2002	Sean Brown	1-year	Re-signing	
July 16, 2002	John Grahame	1-year	Re-signing	
July 17, 2002	Glen Murray	2-year	Re-signing	
July 29, 2002	P. J. Axelsson	1-year	Re-signing	
July 30, 2002	Jonathan Girard	1-year	Re-signing	
August 1, 2002	Jay Henderson	1-year	Re-signing	
August 24, 2002	Lee Goren		Re-signing	
September 9, 2002	Peter Hamerlik	3-year	Entry-level	
December 2, 2002	Joe Thornton	1-year	Extension	
May 31, 2003	Milan Jurcina	3-year	Entry-level	

== Draft picks ==
Boston's draft picks at the 2002 NHL entry draft held at the Air Canada Centre in Toronto, Ontario.

Round	#	Player	Nationality	College/Junior/Club team (League)
1	29	Hannu Toivonen	Finland	HPK (Finland)
2	56	Vladislav Evseev	Russia	CSKA Moscow Jr. (Russia)
4	130	Jan Kubista	Czech Republic	HC Pardubice Jr. (Czech Republic)
5	153	Peter Hamerlik	Slovakia	Kingston Frontenacs (OHL)
7	228	Dmitri Utkin	Russia	Lokomotiv Yaroslavl Jr. (Russia)
8	259	Yan Stastny	Canada	University of Notre Dame (Hockey East)
9	290	Pavel Frolov	Russia	Torpedo Nizhny Novgorod Jrs. (Russia)

== See also ==
- 2002–03 NHL season
