= List of Boston Bruins draft picks =

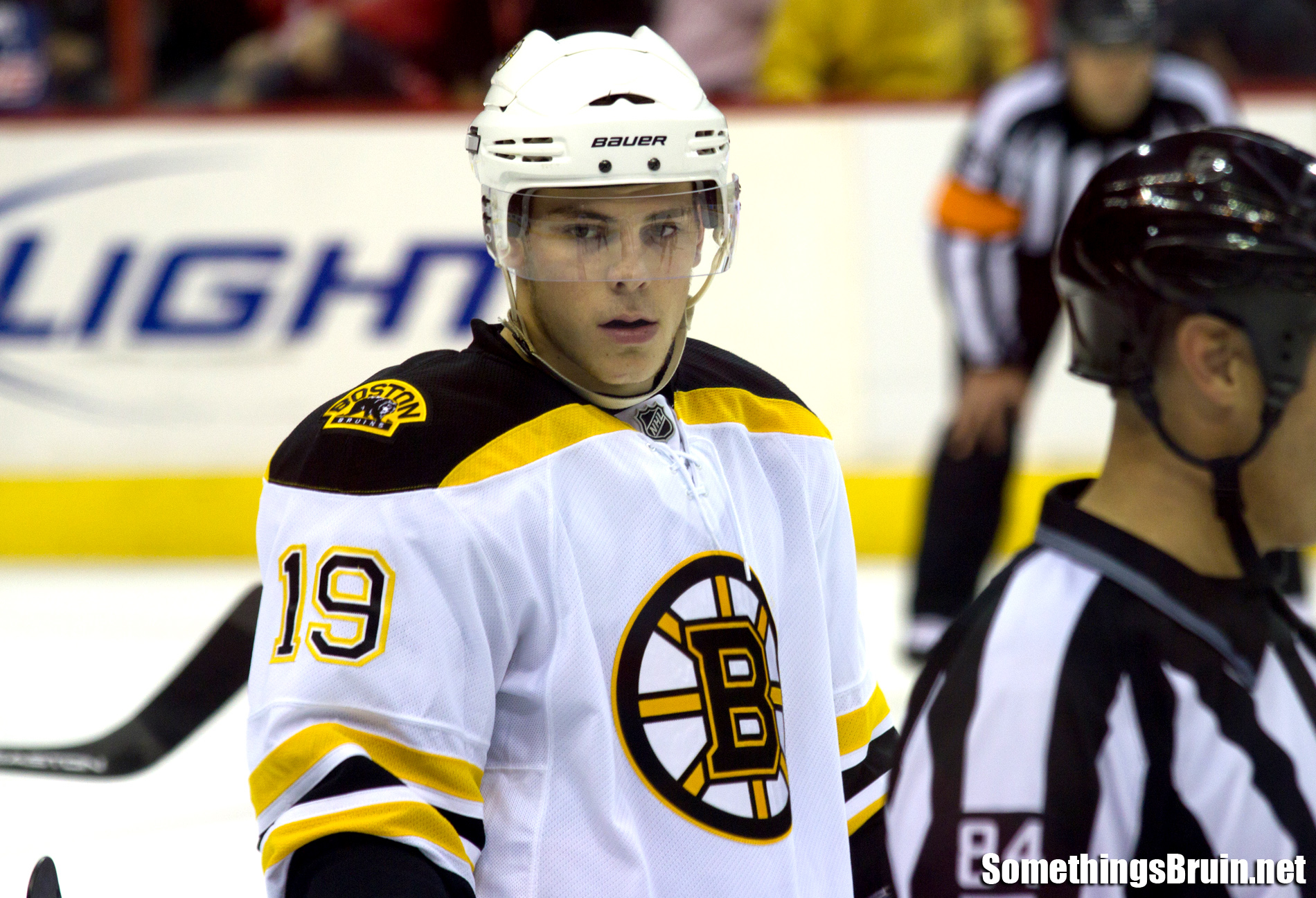
The Bruins selected Tyler Seguin 2nd overall in the 2010 NHL entry draft.

This is a complete list of ice hockey players who were drafted in the National Hockey League Entry Draft by the Boston Bruins franchise. It includes every player who was drafted, regardless of whether they played for the team.

== Key ==
Played at least one game with the Bruins
Spent entire NHL career with the Bruins

General terms and abbreviations
Term or abbreviation	Definition
Draft	The year that the player was selected
Round	The round of the draft in which the player was selected
Pick	The overall position in the draft at which the player was selected
S	Supplemental draft selection

Position abbreviations
Abbreviation	Definition
G	Goaltender
D	Defense
LW	Left wing
C	Center
RW	Right wing
F	Forward

Abbreviations for statistical columns
Abbreviation	Definition
Pos	Position
GP	Games played
G	Goals
A	Assists
Pts	Points
PIM	Penalties in minutes
W	Wins
L	Losses
T/OT	Ties, Overtime/shootout losses
GAA	Goals against average
SV	SV%
—	Does not apply

== Draft picks ==
Statistics are complete as of the 2025–26 NHL season and show each player's career regular season totals in the NHL. Wins, losses, ties, overtime losses and goals against average apply to goaltenders and are used only for players at that position.

List of Boston Bruins draft picks
Draft	Round	Pick	Player	Nationality	Pos	GP	G	A	Pts	PIM	W	L	T/OT	GAA	SV
1963	1	3	Orest Romashyna	Canada	LW	—	—	—	—	—	—	—	—	—	—
1963	2	9	Terrance Lane	Canada	C	—	—	—	—	—	—	—	—	—	—
1963	3	14	Roger Bamburak	Canada	RW	—	—	—	—	—	—	—	—	—	—
1963	4	19	Jim Blair	Canada	F	—	—	—	—	—	—	—	—	—	—
1964	1	2	Alex Campbell	Canada	RW	—	—	—	—	—	—	—	—	—	—
1964	2	8	Jim Booth	Canada	C	—	—	—	—	—	—	—	—	—	—
1964	3	14	Ken Dryden	Canada	G	397	0	19	19	12	258	57	74	2.24	.919
1964	4	20	Allister Blair	Canada	F	—	—	—	—	—	—	—	—	—	—
1965	1	4	Joe Bailey	Canada	F	—	—	—	—	—	—	—	—	—	—
1965	2	9	Bill Ramsay	Canada	D	—	—	—	—	—	—	—	—	—	—
1966	1	1	Barry Gibbs	Canada	D	796	58	224	282	945	—	—	—	—	—
1966	2	7	Rick Smith	Canada	D	687	52	167	219	560	—	—	—	—	—
1966	3	13	Garnet Bailey	Canada	LW	568	107	171	278	633	—	—	—	—	—
1966	4	19	Tom Webster	Canada	RW	102	33	42	75	61	—	—	—	—	—
1967	1	10	Meehan Bonnar	Canada	RW	—	—	—	—	—	—	—	—	—	—
1968	1	12	Danny Schock	Canada	LW	20	1	2	3	0	—	—	—	—	—
1968	2	18	Fraser Rice	Canada	C	—	—	—	—	—	—	—	—	—	—
1968	3	24	Brian St. John	Canada	F	—	—	—	—	—	—	—	—	—	—
1969	1	3	Don Tannahill	Canada	F	111	30	33	63	25	—	—	—	—	—
1969	1	4	Frank Spring	Canada	RW	61	14	20	34	12	—	—	—	—	—
1969	1	11	Ivan Boldirev	Canada	C	1052	361	505	866	507	—	—	—	—	—
1969	2	22	Art Quoquochi	Canada	C	—	—	—	—	—	—	—	—	—	—
1969	3	34	Nels Jacobson	Canada	LW	—	—	—	—	—	—	—	—	—	—
1969	4	46	Ron Fairbrother	Canada	LW	—	—	—	—	—	—	—	—	—	—
1969	5	58	Jerry Wright	Canada	C	—	—	—	—	—	—	—	—	—	—
1969	6	69	Jim Jones	Canada	D	2	0	0	0	0	—	—	—	—	—
1970	1	3	Reggie Leach	Canada	RW	934	381	285	666	387	—	—	—	—	—
1970	1	4	Rick MacLeish	Canada	LW	846	349	410	759	434	—	—	—	—	—
1970	1	9	Ron Plumb	Canada	D	26	3	4	7	14	—	—	—	—	—
1970	1	13	Bob Stewart	Canada	D	576	27	101	128	809	—	—	—	—	—
1970	2	27	Dan Bouchard	Canada	G	655	0	29	29	253	286	232	113	3.26	.886
1970	3	41	Ray Brownlee	Canada	LW	—	—	—	—	—	—	—	—	—	—
1970	4	55	Gord Davies	Canada	RW	—	—	—	—	—	—	—	—	—	—
1970	5	69	Bob Roselle	Canada	C	—	—	—	—	—	—	—	—	—	—
1970	6	83	Murray Wing	Canada	D	1	0	1	1	0	—	—	—	—	—
1970	7	96	Glenn Siddall	Canada	LW	—	—	—	—	—	—	—	—	—	—
1971	1	6	Ron Jones	Canada	D	54	1	4	5	33	—	—	—	—	—
1971	1	14	Terry O'Reilly	Canada	RW	891	204	402	606	2095	—	—	—	—	—
1971	2	28	Curt Ridley	Canada	G	104	0	1	1	17	27	47	16	3.88	.810
1971	3	42	Dave Bonter	Canada	LW	—	—	—	—	—	—	—	—	—	—
1971	4	56	Dave Hynes	United States	LW	22	4	0	4	2	—	—	—	—	—
1971	5	70	Bert Scott	Canada	RW	—	—	—	—	—	—	—	—	—	—
1971	6	84	Bob McMahon	Canada	D	—	—	—	—	—	—	—	—	—	—
1972	1	16	Mike Bloom	Canada	LW	201	30	47	77	215	—	—	—	—	—
1972	2	32	Wayne Elder	Canada	D	—	—	—	—	—	—	—	—	—	—
1972	3	48	Michel Boudreau	Canada	C	—	—	—	—	—	—	—	—	—	—
1972	4	64	Les Jackson	Canada	LW	—	—	—	—	—	—	—	—	—	—
1972	5	80	Brian Coates	Canada	LW	—	—	—	—	—	—	—	—	—	—
1972	6	96	Peter Gaw	Canada	RW	—	—	—	—	—	—	—	—	—	—
1972	7	112	Gordie Clark	Canada	RW	8	0	1	1	0	—	—	—	—	—
1972	8	128	Roy Carmichael	Canada	D	—	—	—	—	—	—	—	—	—	—
1973	1	6	Andre Savard	Canada	C	790	211	271	482	411	—	—	—	—	—
1973	2	31	Jimmy Jones	Canada	RW	148	13	18	31	68	—	—	—	—	—
1973	3	36	Doug Gibson	Canada	C	63	9	19	28	0	—	—	—	—	—
1973	3	47	Al Sims	Canada	D	476	49	116	165	286	—	—	—	—	—
1973	4	63	Steve Langdon	Canada	RW	7	0	1	1	2	—	—	—	—	—
1973	5	79	Peter Crosbie	Canada	G	—	—	—	—	—	—	—	—	—	—
1973	6	95	Jean-Pierre Bourgoyne	Canada	D	—	—	—	—	—	—	—	—	—	—
1973	7	111	Walter Johnson	United States	RW	—	—	—	—	—	—	—	—	—	—
1973	8	127	Virgil Gates	Canada	D	—	—	—	—	—	—	—	—	—	—
1973	9	142	Jim Pettie	Canada	G	21	0	0	0	23	9	7	2	3.65	.855
1973	10	157	Yvon Bouillon	Canada	F	—	—	—	—	—	—	—	—	—	—
1974	1	18	Don Larway	Canada	RW	—	—	—	—	—	—	—	—	—	—
1974	2	25	Mark Howe	United States	D	929	197	545	742	455	—	—	—	—	—
1974	2	36	Peter Sturgeon	Canada	LW	6	0	1	1	2	—	—	—	—	—
1974	3	54	Tom Edur	Canada	D	158	17	70	87	67	—	—	—	—	—
1974	4	72	Bill Reed	Canada	D	—	—	—	—	—	—	—	—	—	—
1974	5	90	Jamie Bateman	Canada	F	—	—	—	—	—	—	—	—	—	—
1974	6	108	Bill Best	Canada	LW	—	—	—	—	—	—	—	—	—	—
1974	7	126	Ray Maluta	Canada	D	25	2	3	5	6	—	—	—	—	—
1974	8	143	Daryl Drader	Canada	LW	—	—	—	—	—	—	—	—	—	—
1974	9	160	Peter Roberts	United States	F	—	—	—	—	—	—	—	—	—	—
1974	10	175	Peter Waselovich	United States	G	—	—	—	—	—	—	—	—	—	—
1975	1	14	Doug Halward	Canada	D	653	69	224	293	774	—	—	—	—	—
1975	2	32	Barry Smith	Canada	C	114	7	7	14	10	—	—	—	—	—
1975	4	60	Rick Adduono	Canada	C	4	0	0	0	2	—	—	—	—	—
1975	4	68	Denis Daigle	Canada	LW	—	—	—	—	—	—	—	—	—	—
1975	5	86	Stan Jonathan	Canada	LW	411	91	110	201	751	—	—	—	—	—
1975	6	104	Matti Hagman	Finland	C	237	56	89	145	36	—	—	—	—	—
1975	7	122	Gary Carr	Canada	G	—	—	—	—	—	—	—	—	—	—
1975	8	140	Bo Berglund	Sweden	F	130	28	39	67	40	—	—	—	—	—
1975	9	156	Joe Rando	United States	D	—	—	—	—	—	—	—	—	—	—
1975	10	171	Kevin Nugent	United States	LW	—	—	—	—	—	—	—	—	—	—
1976	1	16	Clayton Pachal	Canada	C	35	2	3	5	95	—	—	—	—	—
1976	2	34	Lorry Gloeckner	Canada	D	13	0	2	2	6	—	—	—	—	—
1976	4	70	Bob Miller	United States	F	404	75	119	194	220	—	—	—	—	—
1976	5	88	Pete Vandemark	Canada	F	—	—	—	—	—	—	—	—	—	—
1976	6	106	Ted Olson	Canada	LW	—	—	—	—	—	—	—	—	—	—
1977	1	16	Dwight Foster	Canada	F	541	111	163	274	420	—	—	—	—	—
1977	2	34	Dave Parro	Canada	G	77	0	2	2	6	21	36	10	4.09	.876
1977	3	52	Mike Forbes	Canada	D	50	1	11	12	41	—	—	—	—	—
1977	4	70	Brian McGregor	Canada	C	—	—	—	—	—	—	—	—	—	—
1977	5	88	Doug Butler	Canada	D	—	—	—	—	—	—	—	—	—	—
1977	6	106	Keith Johnson	Canada	D	—	—	—	—	—	—	—	—	—	—
1977	7	122	Ralph Cox	United States	F	—	—	—	—	—	—	—	—	—	—
1977	8	138	Mario Claude	Canada	D	—	—	—	—	—	—	—	—	—	—
1978	1	16	Al Secord	Canada	LW	766	273	222	495	2093	—	—	—	—	—
1978	2	35	Graeme Nicolson	Canada	D	52	2	7	9	60	—	—	—	—	—
1978	3	52	Brad Knelson	Canada	D	—	—	—	—	—	—	—	—	—	—
1978	4	68	George Buat	Canada	RW	—	—	—	—	—	—	—	—	—	—
1978	5	85	Daryl MacLeod	United States	LW	—	—	—	—	—	—	—	—	—	—
1978	6	102	Jeff Brubaker	United States	LW	178	16	9	25	512	—	—	—	—	—
1978	7	119	Murray Skinner	Canada	G	—	—	—	—	—	—	—	—	—	—
1978	8	136	Bobby Hehir	United States	C	—	—	—	—	—	—	—	—	—	—
1978	9	153	Craig McTavish	Canada	C	1093	213	267	480	891	—	—	—	—	—
1979	1	8	Ray Bourque	Canada	D	1612	410	1169	1579	1141	—	—	—	—	—
1979	1	15	Brad McCrimmon	Canada	D	1222	81	322	403	1416	—	—	—	—	—
1979	2	36	Doug Morrison	Canada	C	23	7	3	10	15	—	—	—	—	—
1979	3	57	Keith Crowder	Canada	RW	662	223	271	494	1344	—	—	—	—	—
1979	4	78	Larry Melnyk	Canada	D	432	11	63	74	686	—	—	—	—	—
1979	5	99	Marco Baron	Canada	G	86	0	4	4	56	34	38	9	3.63	.862
1979	6	120	Mike Krushelnyski	Canada	C	897	241	328	569	699	—	—	—	—	—
1980	1	18	Barry Pederson	Canada	C	701	238	416	654	472	—	—	—	—	—
1980	3	60	Tom Fergus	United States	C	726	235	346	581	499	—	—	—	—	—
1980	4	81	Steve Kasper	Canada	F	821	177	291	468	554	—	—	—	—	—
1980	5	102	Randy Hillier	Canada	D	543	16	110	126	906	—	—	—	—	—
1980	6	123	Steve Lyons	United States	F	—	—	—	—	—	—	—	—	—	—
1980	7	144	Anthony McMurchy	Canada	C	—	—	—	—	—	—	—	—	—	—
1980	8	165	Mike Moffat	Canada	G	19	0	0	0	2	7	7	2	4.29	.826
1980	9	186	Michael Thelven	Sweden	D	207	20	80	100	217	—	—	—	—	—
1980	10	207	Jens Ohling	Sweden	LW	—	—	—	—	—	—	—	—	—	—
1981	1	14	Normand Leveille	Canada	F	75	17	25	42	49	—	—	—	—	—
1981	2	35	Luc Dufour	Canada	C	167	23	21	44	199	—	—	—	—	—
1981	4	77	Scott McLellan	Canada	RW	2	0	0	0	0	—	—	—	—	—
1981	5	98	Joe Mantione	Canada	G	—	—	—	—	—	—	—	—	—	—
1981	6	119	Bruce Milton	United States	D	—	—	—	—	—	—	—	—	—	—
1981	7	140	Mats Thelin	Sweden	D	163	8	19	27	176	—	—	—	—	—
1981	8	161	Armel Parisee	Canada	D	—	—	—	—	—	—	—	—	—	—
1981	9	182	Don Sylvestri	Canada	G	3	0	0	0	2	0	0	2	3.53	.885
1981	10	203	Richard Bourque	Canada	F	—	—	—	—	—	—	—	—	—	—
1982	1	1	Gord Kluzak	Canada	D	299	25	98	123	543	—	—	—	—	—
1982	2	22	Brian Curran	Canada	D	381	7	33	40	1461	—	—	—	—	—
1982	2	39	Lyndon Byers	Canada	LW	279	28	43	71	1081	—	—	—	—	—
1982	3	60	Dave Reid	Canada	LW	961	165	204	369	253	—	—	—	—	—
1982	5	102	Bob Nicholson	Canada	D	—	—	—	—	—	—	—	—	—	—
1982	6	123	Bob Sweeney	United States	C	639	125	163	288	799	—	—	—	—	—
1982	7	144	John Meulenbroeks	Canada	D	—	—	—	—	—	—	—	—	—	—
1982	8	165	Tony Fiore	Canada	C	—	—	—	—	—	—	—	—	—	—
1982	9	186	Doug Kostynski	Canada	C	15	3	1	4	4	—	—	—	—	—
1982	10	207	Tony Gilliard	Canada	LW	—	—	—	—	—	—	—	—	—	—
1982	11	228	Tommy Lehmann	Sweden	C	36	5	5	10	16	—	—	—	—	—
1982	12	249	Bruno Campese	Canada	G	—	—	—	—	—	—	—	—	—	—
1983	1	21	Nevin Markwart	Canada	F	309	41	68	109	794	—	—	—	—	—
1983	2	42	Greg Johnston	Canada	RW	187	26	30	56	124	—	—	—	—	—
1983	3	62	Greg Puhalski	Canada	C	—	—	—	—	—	—	—	—	—	—
1983	4	82	Allan LaRochelle	Canada	G	—	—	—	—	—	—	—	—	—	—
1983	5	102	Allen Pedersen	Canada	D	428	5	36	41	487	—	—	—	—	—
1983	6	122	Terry Taillefer	Canada	G	—	—	—	—	—	—	—	—	—	—
1983	7	142	Ian Armstrong	Canada	D	—	—	—	—	—	—	—	—	—	—
1983	8	162	Francois Olivier	Canada	LW	—	—	—	—	—	—	—	—	—	—
1983	9	182	Harri Laurila	Finland	D	—	—	—	—	—	—	—	—	—	—
1983	10	202	Paul Fitzsimmons	United States	D	—	—	—	—	—	—	—	—	—	—
1983	11	222	Norm Foster	Canada	G	13	0	0	0	2	7	4	0	3.27	.872
1983	12	242	Greg Murphy	United States	D	—	—	—	—	—	—	—	—	—	—
1984	1	19	Dave Pasin	Canada	C	76	18	19	37	50	—	—	—	—	—
1984	2	40	Ray Podloski	Canada	F	8	0	1	1	22	—	—	—	—	—
1984	3	61	Jeff Cornelius	Canada	D	—	—	—	—	—	—	—	—	—	—
1984	4	82	Bob Joyce	Canada	LW	158	34	49	83	90	—	—	—	—	—
1984	5	103	Mike Bishop	Canada	G	—	—	—	—	—	—	—	—	—	—
1984	6	124	Randy Oswald	Canada	D	—	—	—	—	—	—	—	—	—	—
1984	7	145	Mark Thietke	Canada	F	—	—	—	—	—	—	—	—	—	—
1984	8	166	Don Sweeney	Canada	D	1115	52	221	273	681	—	—	—	—	—
1984	9	186	Kevin Heffernan	United States	F	—	—	—	—	—	—	—	—	—	—
1984	10	207	John Urbanic	Canada	LW	—	—	—	—	—	—	—	—	—	—
1984	11	227	Bill Kopecky	United States	F	—	—	—	—	—	—	—	—	—	—
1984	12	248	Jim Newhouse	United States	F	—	—	—	—	—	—	—	—	—	—
1985	2	31	Alain Cote	Canada	D	119	2	18	20	124	—	—	—	—	—
1985	3	52	Bill Ranford	Canada	G	647	0	24	24	65	240	279	76	3.41	.888
1985	4	73	Jamie Kelly	Canada	F	—	—	—	—	—	—	—	—	—	—
1985	5	94	Steve Moore	Canada	D	—	—	—	—	—	—	—	—	—	—
1985	6	115	Gord Hynes	Canada	D	52	3	9	12	22	—	—	—	—	—
1985	7	136	Per Martinelle	Sweden	F	—	—	—	—	—	—	—	—	—	—
1985	8	157	Randy Burridge	Canada	LW	706	199	251	450	458	—	—	—	—	—
1985	9	178	Gord Cruickshank	Canada	F	—	—	—	—	—	—	—	—	—	—
1985	10	199	Dave Buda	Canada	F	—	—	—	—	—	—	—	—	—	—
1985	10	210	Bob Beers	United States	D	258	28	79	107	225	—	—	—	—	—
1985	11	220	John Byce	United States	RW	21	2	3	5	6	—	—	—	—	—
1985	12	241	Marc West	Canada	C	—	—	—	—	—	—	—	—	—	—
1986	1	13	Craig Janney	United States	C	760	188	563	751	170	—	—	—	—	—
1986	2	34	Pekka Tirkkonen	Finland	C	—	—	—	—	—	—	—	—	—	—
1986	4	76	Dean Hall	Canada	F	—	—	—	—	—	—	—	—	—	—
1986	5	97	Matt Pesklewis	Canada	LW	—	—	—	—	—	—	—	—	—	—
1986	6	118	Garth Premak	Canada	D	—	—	—	—	—	—	—	—	—	—
1986	7	139	Paul Beraldo	Canada	C	10	0	0	0	4	—	—	—	—	—
1986	8	160	Brian Ferreira	United States	F	—	—	—	—	—	—	—	—	—	—
1986	9	181	Jeff Flaherty	United States	F	—	—	—	—	—	—	—	—	—	—
1986	10	202	Greg Hawgood	Canada	D	474	60	164	224	426	—	—	—	—	—
1986	11	223	Steffan Malmquist	Sweden	F	—	—	—	—	—	—	—	—	—	—
1986	12	244	Joel Gardner	Canada	C	—	—	—	—	—	—	—	—	—	—
1986	S	16	Chris Olson	United States	G	—	—	—	—	—	—	—	—	—	—
1987	1	3	Glen Wesley	Canada	D	1457	128	409	537	1045	—	—	—	—	—
1987	1	14	Stephane Quintal	Canada	D	1037	63	180	243	1320	—	—	—	—	—
1987	3	56	Todd Lalonde	Canada	LW	—	—	—	—	—	—	—	—	—	—
1987	4	67	Darwin MacPherson	Canada	D	—	—	—	—	—	—	—	—	—	—
1987	4	77	Matt DelGuidice	United States	G	11	0	0	0	2	2	5	1	3.87	.886
1987	5	98	Ted Donato	United States	LW	796	150	197	347	396	—	—	—	—	—
1987	6	119	Matt Glennon	United States	LW	3	0	0	0	2	—	—	—	—	—
1987	7	140	Rob Cheevers	United States	F	—	—	—	—	—	—	—	—	—	—
1987	8	161	Chris Winnes	United States	RW	33	1	6	7	6	—	—	—	—	—
1987	9	182	Paul Ohman	United States	D	—	—	—	—	—	—	—	—	—	—
1987	10	203	Casey Jones	Canada	D	—	—	—	—	—	—	—	—	—	—
1987	11	224	Eric LeMarque	United States	C	—	—	—	—	—	—	—	—	—	—
1987	12	245	Sean Gorman	United States	D	—	—	—	—	—	—	—	—	—	—
1987	S	15	Mike Jeffrey	Canada	G	—	—	—	—	—	—	—	—	—	—
1988	1	18	Robert Cimetta	Canada	LW	103	16	16	32	66	—	—	—	—	—
1988	3	60	Steve Heinze	United States	RW	694	178	158	336	379	—	—	—	—	—
1988	4	81	Joe Juneau	Canada	C	828	156	416	572	272	—	—	—	—	—
1988	5	102	Dan Murphy	United States	D	—	—	—	—	—	—	—	—	—	—
1988	6	123	Derek Geary	United States	F	—	—	—	—	—	—	—	—	—	—
1988	8	165	Mark Krys	Canada	D	—	—	—	—	—	—	—	—	—	—
1988	9	186	Jon Rohloff	United States	D	150	7	25	32	129	—	—	—	—	—
1988	11	228	Eric Reisman	United States	D	—	—	—	—	—	—	—	—	—	—
1988	12	249	Doug Jones	Canada	D	—	—	—	—	—	—	—	—	—	—
1988	S	23	Chris Harvey	United States	G	—	—	—	—	—	—	—	—	—	—
1989	1	17	Shayne Stevenson	Canada	C	27	0	2	2	35	—	—	—	—	—
1989	2	38	Mike Parson	Canada	G	—	—	—	—	—	—	—	—	—	—
1989	3	57	Wes Walz	Canada	C	607	109	151	260	343	—	—	—	—	—
1989	4	80	Jackson Penney	Canada	RW	—	—	—	—	—	—	—	—	—	—
1989	5	101	Mark Montanari	Canada	F	—	—	—	—	—	—	—	—	—	—
1989	6	122	Steven Foster	United States	D	—	—	—	—	—	—	—	—	—	—
1989	7	143	Oto Hascak	Slovakia	C	—	—	—	—	—	—	—	—	—	—
1989	8	164	Rick Allain	Canada	D	—	—	—	—	—	—	—	—	—	—
1989	9	185	James Lavish	United States	F	—	—	—	—	—	—	—	—	—	—
1989	10	206	Geoff Simpson	Canada	D	—	—	—	—	—	—	—	—	—	—
1989	11	227	David Franzosa	United States	LW	—	—	—	—	—	—	—	—	—	—
1989	S	22	Jeff Schulman	United States	D	—	—	—	—	—	—	—	—	—	—
1990	1	21	Bryan Smolinski	United States	C	1056	274	377	651	606	—	—	—	—	—
1990	3	63	Cam Stewart	Canada	LW	202	16	23	39	120	—	—	—	—	—
1990	4	84	Jerry Buckley	United States	RW	—	—	—	—	—	—	—	—	—	—
1990	5	105	Mike Bales	Canada	G	23	0	0	0	2	2	15	1	4.13	.869
1990	6	126	Mark Woolf	Canada	RW	—	—	—	—	—	—	—	—	—	—
1990	7	147	James Mackey	United States	D	—	—	—	—	—	—	—	—	—	—
1990	8	168	John Gruden	United States	D	92	1	8	9	46	—	—	—	—	—
1990	9	189	Darren Wetherill	Canada	D	—	—	—	—	—	—	—	—	—	—
1990	10	210	Dean Capuano	United States	D	—	—	—	—	—	—	—	—	—	—
1990	11	231	Andy Bezeau	United States	LW	—	—	—	—	—	—	—	—	—	—
1990	12	252	Ted Miskolczi	Canada	RW	—	—	—	—	—	—	—	—	—	—
1990	S	26	Howie Rosenblatt	United States	F	—	—	—	—	—	—	—	—	—	—
1991	1	18	Glen Murray	Canada	RW	1009	337	314	651	679	—	—	—	—	—
1991	2	40	Jozef Stumpel	Slovakia	C	957	196	481	677	245	—	—	—	—	—
1991	3	62	Marcel Cousineau	Canada	G	26	0	1	1	0	4	10	1	2.92	.900
1991	4	84	Brad Tiley	Canada	D	11	0	0	0	0	—	—	—	—	—
1991	5	106	Mariusz Czerkawski	Poland	RW	745	215	220	435	274	—	—	—	—	—
1991	7	150	Gary Golczewski	United States	LW	—	—	—	—	—	—	—	—	—	—
1991	8	172	Jay Moser	United States	RW	—	—	—	—	—	—	—	—	—	—
1991	9	194	Dan Hodge	United States	D	—	—	—	—	—	—	—	—	—	—
1991	10	216	Steve Norton	Canada	D	—	—	—	—	—	—	—	—	—	—
1991	11	238	Steve Lombardi	United States	F	—	—	—	—	—	—	—	—	—	—
1991	12	260	Torsten Kienass	Germany	D	—	—	—	—	—	—	—	—	—	—
1991	S	24	Peter Allen	Canada	D	8	0	0	0	8	—	—	—	—	—
1992	1	16	Dmitri Kvartalnov	Russia	RW	112	42	49	91	26	—	—	—	—	—
1992	3	55	Sergei Zholtok	Latvia	C	588	111	147	258	166	—	—	—	—	—
1992	5	112	Scott Bailey	Canada	G	19	0	0	0	0	6	6	2	3.42	.876
1992	6	133	Jiri Dopita	Czech Republic	C	73	12	21	33	19	—	—	—	—	—
1992	6	136	Grigori Panteleev	Latvia	LW	54	8	6	14	12	—	—	—	—	—
1992	8	184	Kurt Seher	Canada	D	—	—	—	—	—	—	—	—	—	—
1992	9	208	Mattias Timander	Sweden	D	419	13	57	70	165	—	—	—	—	—
1992	10	232	Chris Crombie	Canada	F	—	—	—	—	—	—	—	—	—	—
1992	11	256	Denis Chervyakov	Russia	D	2	0	0	0	2	—	—	—	—	—
1992	11	257	Eugene Pavlov	Russia	RW	—	—	—	—	—	—	—	—	—	—
1993	1	25	Kevyn Adams	United States	C	540	59	77	136	317	—	—	—	—	—
1993	2	51	Matt Alvey	United States	RW	—	—	—	—	—	—	—	—	—	—
1993	4	88	Charles Paquette	Canada	D	—	—	—	—	—	—	—	—	—	—
1993	4	103	Shawn Bates	United States	C	465	72	126	198	266	—	—	—	—	—
1993	5	129	Andrei Sapozhnikov	Russia	D	—	—	—	—	—	—	—	—	—	—
1993	6	155	Milt Mastad	Canada	D	—	—	—	—	—	—	—	—	—	—
1993	7	181	Ryan Golden	United States	LW	—	—	—	—	—	—	—	—	—	—
1993	8	207	Hal Gill	United States	D	1108	36	148	184	962	—	—	—	—	—
1993	9	233	Joel Prpic	Canada	C	18	0	3	3	4	—	—	—	—	—
1993	10	259	Joakim Persson	Sweden	G	—	—	—	—	—	—	—	—	—	—
1994	1	21	Evgeni Ryabchikov	Russia	G	—	—	—	—	—	—	—	—	—	—
1994	2	47	Daniel Goneau	Canada	LW	53	12	3	15	14	—	—	—	—	—
1994	4	99	Eric Nickulas	United States	RW	118	15	23	38	82	—	—	—	—	—
1994	5	125	Darren Wright	Canada	D	—	—	—	—	—	—	—	—	—	—
1994	6	151	Andre Roy	United States	LW	515	35	33	68	1169	—	—	—	—	—
1994	7	177	Jeremy Schaefer	Canada	F	—	—	—	—	—	—	—	—	—	—
1994	9	229	John Grahame	United States	G	224	0	9	9	51	97	86	18	2.79	.898
1994	10	255	Neil Savary	Canada	G	—	—	—	—	—	—	—	—	—	—
1994	11	281	Andrei Yakhanov	Russia	D	—	—	—	—	—	—	—	—	—	—
1995	1	9	Kyle McLaren	Canada	D	719	46	161	207	671	—	—	—	—	—
1995	1	21	Sean Brown	Canada	D	436	14	43	57	907	—	—	—	—	—
1995	2	47	Paxton Schafer	Canada	G	3	0	0	0	0	0	0	0	4.68	.760
1995	3	73	Bill McCauley	United States	D	—	—	—	—	—	—	—	—	—	—
1995	4	99	Cameron Mann	Canada	RW	93	14	10	24	40	—	—	—	—	—
1995	6	151	Evgeny Shaldybin	Russia	D	3	1	0	1	0	—	—	—	—	—
1995	7	177	P. J. Axelsson	Sweden	LW	797	103	184	287	276	—	—	—	—	—
1995	8	203	Sergei Zhukov	Russia	D	—	—	—	—	—	—	—	—	—	—
1995	9	229	Jonathan Murphy	Canada	D	—	—	—	—	—	—	—	—	—	—
1996	1	8	Johnathan Aitken	Canada	D	44	0	1	1	70	—	—	—	—	—
1996	2	45	Henry Kuster	Canada	F	—	—	—	—	—	—	—	—	—	—
1996	3	53	Eric Naud	Canada	LW	—	—	—	—	—	—	—	—	—	—
1996	3	80	Jason Doyle	Canada	RW	—	—	—	—	—	—	—	—	—	—
1996	4	100	Trent Whitfield	Canada	C	193	11	18	29	104	—	—	—	—	—
1996	5	132	Elias Abrahamsson	Sweden	D	—	—	—	—	—	—	—	—	—	—
1996	6	155	Chris Lane	Canada	D	—	—	—	—	—	—	—	—	—	—
1996	7	182	Tom Brown	Canada	D	—	—	—	—	—	—	—	—	—	—
1996	8	208	Bob Prier	Canada	F	—	—	—	—	—	—	—	—	—	—
1996	9	234	Anders Soderberg	Sweden	LW	—	—	—	—	—	—	—	—	—	—
1997	1	1	Joe Thornton	Canada	C	1714	430	1109	1539	1272	—	—	—	—	—
1997	1	8	Sergei Samsonov	Russia	LW	888	235	336	571	209	—	—	—	—	—
1997	2	27	Ben Clymer	United States	D	438	52	77	129	367	—	—	—	—	—
1997	3	54	Mattias Karlin	Sweden	C	—	—	—	—	—	—	—	—	—	—
1997	3	63	Lee Goren	Canada	RW	67	5	4	9	44	—	—	—	—	—
1997	4	81	Karol Bartanus	Slovakia	RW	—	—	—	—	—	—	—	—	—	—
1997	6	135	Denis Timofeyev	Russia	D	—	—	—	—	—	—	—	—	—	—
1997	7	162	Joel Trottier	Canada	RW	—	—	—	—	—	—	—	—	—	—
1997	7	180	Jim Baxter	Canada	D	—	—	—	—	—	—	—	—	—	—
1997	8	191	Antti Laaksonen	Finland	LW	483	81	87	168	152	—	—	—	—	—
1997	9	218	Eric Van Acker	Canada	D	—	—	—	—	—	—	—	—	—	—
1997	9	246	Jay Henderson	Canada	LW	33	1	3	4	37	—	—	—	—	—
1998	2	48	Jonathan Girard	Canada	D	150	10	34	44	46	—	—	—	—	—
1998	2	52	Bobby Allen	United States	D	51	0	3	3	12	—	—	—	—	—
1998	3	78	Peter Nordstrom	Sweden	LW	2	0	0	0	0	—	—	—	—	—
1998	5	135	Andrew Raycroft	Canada	G	280	0	3	3	14	113	114	27	2.89	.900
1998	6	165	Ryan Milanovic	Canada	LW	—	—	—	—	—	—	—	—	—	—
1999	1	21	Nick Boynton	Canada	D	605	34	110	144	862	—	—	—	—	—
1999	2	56	Matt Zultek	Canada	LW	—	—	—	—	—	—	—	—	—	—
1999	3	89	Kyle Wanvig	Canada	RW	75	6	9	15	94	—	—	—	—	—
1999	4	118	Jaakko Harikkala	Finland	D	—	—	—	—	—	—	—	—	—	—
1999	5	147	Seamus Kotyk	Canada	G	—	—	—	—	—	—	—	—	—	—
1999	6	179	Donald Choukalos	Canada	G	—	—	—	—	—	—	—	—	—	—
1999	7	207	Greg Barber	Canada	RW	—	—	—	—	—	—	—	—	—	—
1999	8	236	John Cronin	United States	D	—	—	—	—	—	—	—	—	—	—
1999	9	247	Mikko Eloranta	Finland	LW	264	32	44	76	186	—	—	—	—	—
1999	9	264	Georgijs Pujacs	Latvia	D	—	—	—	—	—	—	—	—	—	—
2000	1	7	Lars Jonsson	Sweden	D	8	0	2	2	6	—	—	—	—	—
2000	1	27	Martin Samuelsson	Sweden	RW	14	0	1	1	2	—	—	—	—	—
2000	2	37	Andy Hilbert	United States	C	307	42	62	104	132	—	—	—	—	—
2000	2	59	Ivan Huml	Czech Republic	F	49	6	12	18	36	—	—	—	—	—
2000	3	66	Tuukka Makela	Finland	D	—	—	—	—	—	—	—	—	—	—
2000	3	73	Sergei Zinovjev	Russia	C	10	0	1	1	2	—	—	—	—	—
2000	4	103	Brett Nowak	United States	C	—	—	—	—	—	—	—	—	—	—
2000	6	174	Jarno Kultanen	Finland	D	102	2	11	13	59	—	—	—	—	—
2000	7	204	Chris Berti	Canada	C	—	—	—	—	—	—	—	—	—	—
2000	8	237	Zdenek Kutlak	Czech Republic	D	16	1	2	3	4	—	—	—	—	—
2000	9	268	Pavel Kolarik	Czech Republic	D	23	0	0	0	10	—	—	—	—	—
2000	9	279	Andreas Lindstrom	Sweden	F	—	—	—	—	—	—	—	—	—	—
2001	1	19	Shaone Morrisonn	Canada	D	480	11	64	75	455	—	—	—	—	—
2001	3	77	Darren McLachlan	Canada	LW	—	—	—	—	—	—	—	—	—	—
2001	4	111	Matti Kaltiainen	Finland	G	—	—	—	—	—	—	—	—	—	—
2001	5	147	Jiri Jakes	Czech Republic	RW	—	—	—	—	—	—	—	—	—	—
2001	6	179	Andrew Alberts	United States	D	459	8	47	55	492	—	—	—	—	—
2001	7	209	Jordan Sigalet	Canada	G	1	0	0	0	0	0	0	0	0.00	—
2001	8	241	Milan Jurcina	Slovakia	D	430	22	59	81	280	—	—	—	—	—
2001	9	282	Marcel Rodman	Slovenia	RW	—	—	—	—	—	—	—	—	—	—
2002	1	29	Hannu Toivonen	Finland	G	61	0	0	0	10	18	24	10	3.37	.890
2002	2	56	Vladislav Evseev	Russia	LW	—	—	—	—	—	—	—	—	—	—
2002	4	130	Jan Kubista	Czech Republic	RW	—	—	—	—	—	—	—	—	—	—
2002	5	153	Peter Hamerlik	Slovakia	G	—	—	—	—	—	—	—	—	—	—
2002	7	228	Dmitri Utkin	Russia	F	—	—	—	—	—	—	—	—	—	—
2002	8	259	Yan Stastny	United States	C	91	6	10	16	58	—	—	—	—	—
2002	9	290	Pavel Frolov	Russia	F	—	—	—	—	—	—	—	—	—	—
2003	1	21	Mark Stuart	United States	D	673	26	67	93	722	—	—	—	—	—
2003	2	45	Patrice Bergeron	Canada	C	1294	427	613	1040	494	—	—	—	—	—
2003	2	66	Masi Marjamaki	Finland	LW	1	0	0	0	0	—	—	—	—	—
2003	4	107	Byron Bitz	Canada	RW	97	10	12	22	65	—	—	—	—	—
2003	4	118	Frank Rediker	United States	D	—	—	—	—	—	—	—	—	—	—
2003	4	129	Patrik Valcak	Czech Republic	LW	—	—	—	—	—	—	—	—	—	—
2003	5	153	Mike Brown	United States	G	—	—	—	—	—	—	—	—	—	—
2003	6	183	Nate Thompson	United States	C	844	65	99	164	401	—	—	—	—	—
2003	8	247	Benoit Mondou	Canada	RW	—	—	—	—	—	—	—	—	—	—
2003	9	277	Kevin Regan	United States	G	—	—	—	—	—	—	—	—	—	—
2004	2	63	David Krejci	Czech Republic	C	1032	231	555	786	359	—	—	—	—	—
2004	2	64	Martins Karsums	Latvia	RW	24	1	5	6	6	—	—	—	—	—
2004	4	108	Ashton Rome	Canada	RW	—	—	—	—	—	—	—	—	—	—
2004	5	134	Kris Versteeg	Canada	RW	643	149	209	358	374	—	—	—	—	—
2004	5	160	Ben Walter	Canada	C	24	1	0	1	6	—	—	—	—	—
2004	7	224	Matt Hunwick	United States	D	535	25	94	119	207	—	—	—	—	—
2004	8	255	Anton Hedman	Sweden	F	—	—	—	—	—	—	—	—	—	—
2005	1	22	Matt Lashoff	United States	D	74	1	15	16	59	—	—	—	—	—
2005	2	39	Petr Kalus	Czech Republic	RW	11	4	1	5	6	—	—	—	—	—
2005	3	83	Mikko Lehtonen	Finland	RW	2	0	0	0	0	—	—	—	—	—
2005	4	100	Jonathan Sigalet	Canada	D	1	0	0	0	4	—	—	—	—	—
2005	4	106	Vladimir Sobotka	Czech Republic	C	548	53	118	171	362	—	—	—	—	—
2005	5	154	Wacey Rabbit	Canada	C	—	—	—	—	—	—	—	—	—	—
2005	6	172	Lukas Vantuch	Czech Republic	C	—	—	—	—	—	—	—	—	—	—
2005	7	217	Brock Bradford	Canada	C	—	—	—	—	—	—	—	—	—	—
2006	1	5	Phil Kessel	United States	RW	1286	413	579	992	402	—	—	—	—	—
2006	2	37	Yuri Alexandrov	Russia	D	—	—	—	—	—	—	—	—	—	—
2006	2	50	Milan Lucic	Canada	LW	1177	233	353	586	1301	—	—	—	—	—
2006	3	71	Brad Marchand	Canada	RW	1152	451	583	1034	1153	—	—	—	—	—
2006	5	128	Andrew Bodnarchuk	Canada	D	42	0	4	4	16	—	—	—	—	—
2006	6	158	Levi Nelson	Canada	C	—	—	—	—	—	—	—	—	—	—
2007	1	8	Zach Hamill	Canada	C	20	0	4	4	4	—	—	—	—	—
2007	2	35	Tommy Cross	United States	D	3	0	1	1	0	—	—	—	—	—
2007	5	130	Denis Reul	Germany	D	—	—	—	—	—	—	—	—	—	—
2007	6	159	Alain Goulet	Canada	D	—	—	—	—	—	—	—	—	—	—
2007	6	169	Radim Ostrcil	Czech Republic	D	—	—	—	—	—	—	—	—	—	—
2007	7	189	Jordan Knackstedt	Canada	RW	—	—	—	—	—	—	—	—	—	—
2008	1	16	Joe Colborne	Canada	C	295	42	72	114	144	—	—	—	—	—
2008	2	47	Maxime Sauve	Canada	C	1	0	0	0	0	—	—	—	—	—
2008	3	77	Michael Hutchinson	Canada	G	154	0	2	2	0	57	62	18	2.93	.903
2008	4	97	Jamie Arniel	Canada	C	1	0	0	0	0	—	—	—	—	—
2008	6	173	Nicolas Tremblay	Canada	C	—	—	—	—	—	—	—	—	—	—
2008	7	197	Mark Goggin	United States	C	—	—	—	—	—	—	—	—	—	—
2009	1	25	Jordan Caron	Canada	RW	157	12	16	28	78	—	—	—	—	—
2009	3	86	Ryan Button	Canada	D	—	—	—	—	—	—	—	—	—	—
2009	4	112	Lane MacDermid	United States	LW	21	2	2	4	36	—	—	—	—	—
2009	6	176	Tyler Randell	Canada	RW	27	6	0	6	47	—	—	—	—	—
2009	7	206	Ben Sexton	Canada	C	2	0	0	0	0	—	—	—	—	—
2010	1	2	Tyler Seguin	Canada	C	1016	367	459	826	309	—	—	—	—	—
2010	2	32	Jared Knight	United States	C	—	—	—	—	—	—	—	—	—	—
2010	2	45	Ryan Spooner	Canada	C	325	48	119	167	63	—	—	—	—	—
2010	4	97	Craig Cunningham	Canada	LW	63	3	5	8	6	—	—	—	—	—
2010	5	135	Justin Florek	United States	F	4	1	1	2	0	—	—	—	—	—
2010	6	165	Zane McIntyre	United States	G	8	0	0	0	0	0	4	1	3.93	.858
2010	7	195	Maxim Chudinov	Russia	D	—	—	—	—	—	—	—	—	—	—
2010	7	210	Zach Trotman	United States	D	91	3	10	13	30	—	—	—	—	—
2011	1	9	Dougie Hamilton	Canada	D	912	163	377	540	574	—	—	—	—	—
2011	2	40	Alexander Khokhlachev	Russia	LW	9	0	0	0	2	—	—	—	—	—
2011	3	81	Anthony Camara	Canada	LW	—	—	—	—	—	—	—	—	—	—
2011	4	121	Brian Ferlin	United States	RW	7	0	1	1	0	—	—	—	—	—
2011	5	151	Rob O'Gara	United States	D	33	0	3	3	6	—	—	—	—	—
2011	6	181	Lars Volden	Norway	G	—	—	—	—	—	—	—	—	—	—
2012	1	24	Malcolm Subban	Canada	G	87	0	0	0	6	36	34	9	3.10	.898
2012	3	85	Matt Grzelcyk	United States	D	596	26	161	187	285	—	—	—	—	—
2012	5	131	Seth Griffith	Canada	RW	80	8	11	19	24	—	—	—	—	—
2012	5	145	Cody Payne	United States	C	—	—	—	—	—	—	—	—	—	—
2012	6	175	Matthew Benning	Canada	D	465	17	85	102	239	—	—	—	—	—
2012	7	205	Colton Hargrove	United States	F	—	—	—	—	—	—	—	—	—	—
2013	2	60	Linus Arnesson	Sweden	D	—	—	—	—	—	—	—	—	—	—
2013	3	90	Peter Cehlarik	Slovakia	LW	40	5	6	11	10	—	—	—	—	—
2013	4	120	Ryan Fitzgerald	United States	C	—	—	—	—	—	—	—	—	—	—
2013	5	150	Wiley Sherman	United States	D	—	—	—	—	—	—	—	—	—	—
2013	6	180	Anton Blidh	Sweden	LW	89	4	9	13	43	—	—	—	—	—
2013	7	210	Mitchell Dempsey	Canada	LW	—	—	—	—	—	—	—	—	—	—
2014	1	25	David Pastrnak	Czech Republic	RW	833	420	513	933	414	—	—	—	—	—
2014	2	56	Ryan Donato	United States	C	565	123	134	257	229	—	—	—	—	—
2014	4	116	Danton Heinen	Canada	C	612	102	151	253	147	—	—	—	—	—
2014	5	146	Anders Bjork	United States	LW	225	26	35	61	44	—	—	—	—	—
2014	7	206	Emil Johansson	Sweden	D	—	—	—	—	—	—	—	—	—	—
2015	1	13	Jakub Zboril	Czech Republic	D	76	1	15	16	28	—	—	—	—	—
2015	1	14	Jake DeBrusk	Canada	LW	628	189	167	356	131	—	—	—	—	—
2015	1	15	Zachary Senyshyn	Canada	RW	16	1	2	3	4	—	—	—	—	—
2015	2	37	Brandon Carlo	United States	D	692	29	90	119	381	—	—	—	—	—
2015	2	45	Jakob Forsbacka Karlsson	Sweden	C	29	3	6	9	2	—	—	—	—	—
2015	2	52	Jeremy Lauzon	Canada	D	384	15	43	58	442	—	—	—	—	—
2015	3	75	Dan Vladar	Czech Republic	G	157	0	2	2	8	78	48	23	2.79	.898
2015	4	105	Jesse Gabrielle	Canada	LW	—	—	—	—	—	—	—	—	—	—
2015	6	165	Cameron Hughes	Canada	C	5	1	0	1	0	—	—	—	—	—
2015	7	195	Jack Becker	United States	C	—	—	—	—	—	—	—	—	—	—
2016	1	14	Charlie McAvoy	United States	D	573	71	290	361	491	—	—	—	—	—
2016	1	29	Trent Frederic	United States	C	412	59	57	116	365	—	—	—	—	—
2016	2	49	Ryan Lindgren	United States	D	481	16	95	111	319	—	—	—	—	—
2016	5	135	Joona Koppanen	Finland	LW	33	1	2	3	6	—	—	—	—	—
2016	5	136	Cameron Clarke	United States	D	—	—	—	—	—	—	—	—	—	—
2016	6	195	Oskar Steen	Sweden	C	60	4	4	8	12	—	—	—	—	—
2017	1	18	Urho Vaakanainen	Finland	D	221	3	43	46	70	—	—	—	—	—
2017	2	53	Jack Studnicka	Canada	C	126	6	10	16	32	—	—	—	—	—
2017	4	111	Jeremy Swayman	United States	G	245	0	1	1	21	132	80	26	2.60	.910
2017	6	173	Cedric Pare	Canada	C	—	—	—	—	—	—	—	—	—	—
2017	7	195	Victor Berglund	Sweden	D	—	—	—	—	—	—	—	—	—	—
2017	7	204	Daniel Bukac	Czech Republic	D	—	—	—	—	—	—	—	—	—	—
2018	2	57	Axel Andersson	Sweden	D	—	—	—	—	—	—	—	—	—	—
2018	3	77	Jakub Lauko	Czech Republic	C	139	11	17	28	90	—	—	—	—	—
2018	4	119	Curtis Hall	United States	C	—	—	—	—	—	—	—	—	—	—
2018	6	181	Dustyn McFaul	Canada	D	—	—	—	—	—	—	—	—	—	—
2018	7	212	Pavel Shen	Russia	C	—	—	—	—	—	—	—	—	—	—
2019	1	30	John Beecher	United States	C	165	13	15	28	81	—	—	—	—	—
2019	3	92	Quinn Olson	Canada	LW	—	—	—	—	—	—	—	—	—	—
2019	5	154	Roman Bychkov	Russia	D	—	—	—	—	—	—	—	—	—	—
2019	6	185	Matias Mantykivi	Finland	C	—	—	—	—	—	—	—	—	—	—
2019	7	192	Jake Schmaltz	United States	LW	—	—	—	—	—	—	—	—	—	—
2020	2	58	Mason Lohrei	United States	D	191	16	56	72	54	—	—	—	—	—
2020	3	89	Trevor Kuntar	United States	C	1	0	0	0	0	—	—	—	—	—
2020	5	151	Mason Langenbrunner	United States	D	—	—	—	—	—	—	—	—	—	—
2020	6	182	Riley Duran	United States	C	2	0	0	0	2	—	—	—	—	—
2021	1	21	Fabian Lysell	Sweden	RW	12	1	2	3	6	—	—	—	—	—
2021	3	85	Brett Harrison	Canada	C	—	—	—	—	—	—	—	—	—	—
2021	4	117	Philip Svedeback	Sweden	G	—	—	—	—	—	—	—	—	—	—
2021	5	149	Oskar Jellvik	Sweden	C	—	—	—	—	—	—	—	—	—	—
2021	6	181	Ryan Mast	United States	D	—	—	—	—	—	—	—	—	—	—
2021	7	213	Andre Gasseau	United States	C	—	—	—	—	—	—	—	—	—	—
2021	7	217	Ty Gallagher	United States	LW	—	—	—	—	—	—	—	—	—	—
2022	2	54	Matthew Poitras	Canada	C	69	7	20	27	18	—	—	—	—	—
2022	4	117	Cole Spicer	United States	C	—	—	—	—	—	—	—	—	—	—
2022	4	119	Dans Locmelis	Latvia	D	—	—	—	—	—	—	—	—	—	—
2022	5	132	Frederic Brunet	Canada	D	1	0	0	0	0	—	—	—	—	—
2022	6	183	Reid Dyck	Canada	G	—	—	—	—	—	—	—	—	—	—
2022	7	200	Jackson Edward	Canada	D	—	—	—	—	—	—	—	—	—	—
2023	3	92	Christopher Pelosi	United States	C	—	—	—	—	—	—	—	—	—	—
2023	4	124	Beckett Hendrickson	United States	C	—	—	—	—	—	—	—	—	—	—
2023	6	188	Ryan Walsh	United States	C	—	—	—	—	—	—	—	—	—	—
2023	2	214	Casper Nassen	Sweden	RW	—	—	—	—	—	—	—	—	—	—
2023	7	220	Kristian Kostadinski	Sweden	D	—	—	—	—	—	—	—	—	—	—
2024	1	25	Dean Letourneau	Canada	C	—	—	—	—	—	—	—	—	—	—
2024	4	110	Elliott Groenewold	United States	D	—	—	—	—	—	—	—	—	—	—
2024	5	154	Jonathan Morello	Canada	C	—	—	—	—	—	—	—	—	—	—
2024	6	186	Loke Johansson	Sweden	D	—	—	—	—	—	—	—	—	—	—
2025	1	7	James Hagens	United States	C	2	0	1	1	2	—	—	—	—	—
2025	2	51	William Moore	United States	C	—	—	—	—	—	—	—	—	—	—
2025	2	61	Liam Pettersson	Sweden	D	—	—	—	—	—	—	—	—	—	—
2025	3	79	Cooper Simpson	United States	LW	—	—	—	—	—	—	—	—	—	—
2025	4	100	Vashek Blanar	Czech Republic	D	—	—	—	—	—	—	—	—	—	—
2025	5	133	Cole Chandler	Canada	C	—	—	—	—	—	—	—	—	—	—
2025	6	165	Kirill Yemelyanov	Russia	C	—	—	—	—	—	—	—	—	—	—
2026	2	56	Yury Ivanov	Russia	G	—	—	—	—	—	—	—	—	—	—
2026	3	88	Nils Bartholdsson	Sweden	RW	—	—	—	—	—	—	—	—	—	—
2026	4	104	Matvei Kotkov	Russia	RW	—	—	—	—	—	—	—	—	—	—
2026	4	122	Oscar Olsson	Sweden	LW	—	—	—	—	—	—	—	—	—	—
2026	5	157	Jacob Vandeven	Canada	D	—	—	—	—	—	—	—	—	—	—
2026	6	170	Leo Henriquez	Slovakia	G	—	—	—	—	—	—	—	—	—	—
2026	7	216	Cullen McCrate	United States	D	—	—	—	—	—	—	—	—	—	—

== See also ==
- List of Boston Bruins players
