= Lars Jonsson (ice hockey) =

Swedish ice hockey player (born 1982)

- Born: 2 January 1982 (age 44) Borlänge, Sweden
- Height: 6 ft 2 in (188 cm)
- Weight: 207 lb (94 kg; 14 st 11 lb)
- Position: Defence
- Shot: Left
- Played for: Leksands IF; Timrå IK; HV71; Philadelphia Flyers; Brynäs IF
- National team: Sweden
- NHL draft: 7th overall, 2000; Boston Bruins
- Playing career: 1999–2013

Lars Martin Jonsson (born 2 January 1982) is a Swedish former professional ice hockey defenceman. He played most of his career, which lasted from 1999 to 2013, in Sweden for Leksands IF, Timrå IK, HV71, and Brynäs IF. He spent two years in North America playing for the Philadelphia Flyers organization, appearing in eight National Hockey League (NHL) games.

== Playing career ==
Jonsson began playing for Leksands IF of Elitserien in 1999. Shortly after the season ended, he was drafted in the first round of the 2000 NHL entry draft by the Boston Bruins. Although the Bruins continually showed interest in him, attempting to sign him several times, they ran into issues with the NHL Collective Bargaining Agreement, which now states that European prospects will no longer remain indefinite property of the teams that draft them. As a result, the Bruins chose not to sign him and decided to instead receive the 37th overall pick in the 2006 Draft as compensation. The Bruins selected Yuri Alexandrov, a Russian defenseman who would play 66 games with the Providence Bruins during the 2010-11 AHL season before returning to Russia in 2011.

On the first day of free agency, Jonsson signed a one-year contract with the Philadelphia Flyers. He alternated between the Flyers and their AHL affiliate, the Philadelphia Phantoms. Although an ankle sprain caused him to miss the beginning of the 2006–07 season, he started with the Flyers, mainly on the powerplay, but he was sent down to play for the Phantoms after two games to adjust to North American hockey. He was called back up to the Flyers on 21 November 2006. He was later reassigned to the Phantoms on 27 September 2007.

Having spent two seasons in North America, Jonsson returned to the Swedish Elitserien by signing a two-year contract with Brynäs IF on 15 May 2008.

On 15 August 2013, Jonsson officially announced his retirement from hockey.

== Awards ==
- Named Best Defenseman in TV-pucken in 1998.
- Bronze medal at the IIHF World U18 Championship in 2000.
- Promotion to Elitserien with Leksands IF in 2002.

== Career statistics ==
=== Regular season and playoffs ===
			Regular season					Playoffs
Season	Team	League	GP	G	A	Pts	PIM	GP	G	A	Pts	PIM
1998–99	Leksands IF	J20	40	4	8	12	42	—	—	—	—	—
1999–2000	Leksands IF	J20	34	16	22	38	50	2	0	0	0	0
1999–2000	Leksands IF	SEL	5	0	0	0	4	—	—	—	—	—
1999–2000	Leksands IF	SWE U18	—	—	—	—	—	4	0	1	1	10
2000–01	Leksands IF	J20	3	1	2	3	2	4	0	1	1	4
2000–01	Leksands IF	SEL	31	2	1	3	12	—	—	—	—	—
2001–02	Leksands IF	SWE.2	40	2	8	10	94	8	0	2	2	6
2001–02	Leksands IF	J20	—	—	—	—	—	4	2	1	3	4
2002–03	Leksands IF	J20	1	1	1	2	0	—	—	—	—	—
2002–03	Leksands IF	SEL	21	0	0	0	12	5	0	0	0	2
2002–03	IFK Arboga IK	SWE.2	4	0	0	0	4	—	—	—	—	—
2002–03	IF Björklöven	SWE.2	9	3	4	7	10	—	—	—	—	—
2003–04	Leksands IF	J20	1	2	1	3	0	—	—	—	—	—
2003–04	Leksands IF	SEL	50	3	9	12	30	—	—	—	—	—
2004–05	Timrå IK	SEL	50	5	6	11	32	7	0	0	0	2
2005–06	HV71	SEL	50	11	16	27	46	11	2	3	5	14
2006–07	Philadelphia Flyers	NHL	8	0	2	2	6	—	—	—	—	—
2006–07	Philadelphia Phantoms	AHL	40	4	11	15	26	—	—	—	—	—
2007–08	Philadelphia Phantoms	AHL	44	5	13	18	18	7	1	4	5	6
2008–09	Brynäs IF	SEL	53	9	12	21	26	4	0	0	0	2
2009–10	Brynäs IF	SEL	8	1	3	4	8	—	—	—	—	—
2010–11	Brynäs IF	SEL	45	13	7	20	20	5	1	2	3	4
2011–12	Brynäs IF	SEL	42	0	6	6	12	16	0	1	1	18
2012–13	Brynäs IF	SEL	6	0	0	0	2	—	—	—	—	—
2012–13	Almtuna IS	SWE.2	3	1	0	1	0	—	—	—	—	—
SEL totals			361	44	60	104	204	48	3	6	9	42
NHL totals			8	0	2	2	6	—	—	—	—	—
AHL totals			84	9	24	33	44	7	1	4	5	6

=== International ===
Year	Team	Event	GP	G	A	Pts	PIM
2000	Sweden	WJC18	6	0	0	0	2
2002	Sweden	WJC	7	1	1	2	8
Junior totals			13	1	1	2	10

Preceded by Nick Boynton	Boston Bruins first-round draft pick 2000	Succeeded by Martin Samuelsson
