= Joe Rando =

American former ice hockey player

- Born: April 10, 1955 (age 71) Dedham, Massachusetts, USA
- Position: Defense
- Played for: New Hampshire Wildcats; New England Whalers; Boston Bruins
- NHL draft: 156th overall, 1975; Boston Bruins
- WHA draft: 87th, 1974; New England Whalers

Joe Rando (born April 10, 1955) is an American former ice hockey player from Dedham, Massachusetts.

== Biography ==
Rando was born on April 10, 1955, to Frank Rando. He was drafted in the sixth round (87th overall) by the New England Whalers in the 1974 World Hockey Association draft and then in the ninth round (156th overall) by the Boston Bruins in the 1975 National Hockey League draft. He played defense and received three stitches over his right eye after getting into a fight in his first ever game in the NHL. He also played for the University of New Hampshire and Dedham High School.

He later coached hockey. His siblings include Diana, Joanne, Lois, and Linda.
