= Shaone Morrisonn =

Canadian-Croatian ice hockey player (born 1982)

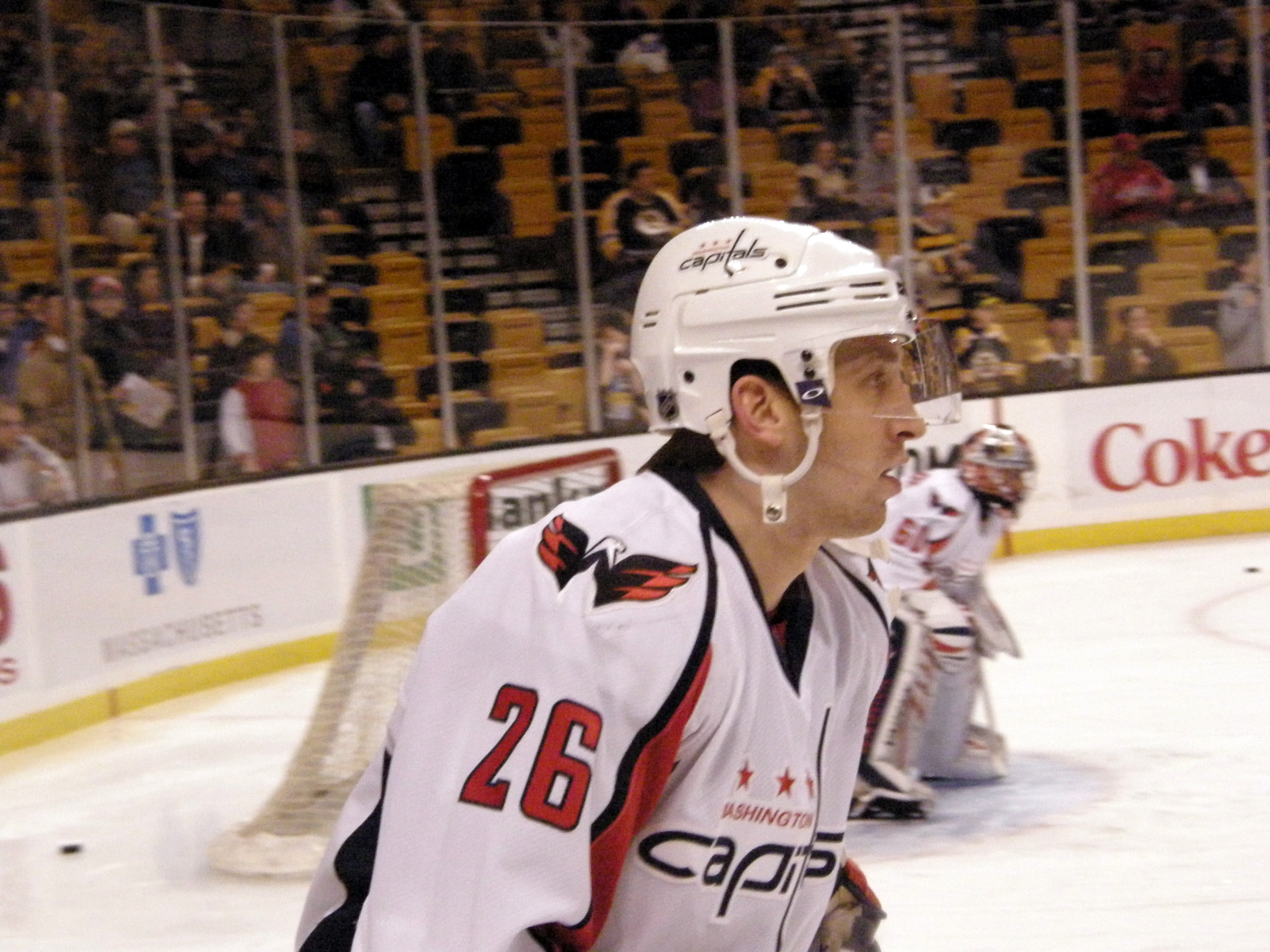
- Morrisonn with the Washington Capitals
- Born: December 23, 1982 (age 43) Vancouver, British Columbia, Canada
- Height: 6 ft 4 in (193 cm)
- Weight: 210 lb (95 kg; 15 st 0 lb)
- Position: Defence
- Shot: Left
- Played for: Boston Bruins; Washington Capitals; Buffalo Sabres; Spartak Moscow; HC CSKA Moscow; HC TPS; Medveščak Zagreb; Admiral Vladivostok
- National team: Croatia
- NHL draft: 19th overall, 2001; Boston Bruins
- Playing career: 2003–2021

Shaone Morrisonn (born December 23, 1982) is a Canadian-Croatian former professional ice hockey defenceman. He played for the Boston Bruins, Washington Capitals and the Buffalo Sabres during his eight-year NHL career. He currently serves as a European professional scout for the New York Rangers.

== Playing career ==
Morrisonn started his hockey career with the Vancouver Thunderbird Minor Hockey Association (VTMHA). After proving himself at the community level, he was drafted by the Kamloops Blazers of the WHL and subsequently drafted in the 1st round, 19th overall by the Boston Bruins in the 2001 NHL entry draft. He was later dealt to the Capitals on March 3, 2004 in the trade that sent Sergei Gonchar to the Bruins. While with the Bruins, Morrisonn scored his first NHL goal. It came in Boston's 4-3 home win over Toronto on January 1, 2004.

Morrisonn was often paired with 2007–08 NHL lead goal-scoring defenceman Mike Green. He began to prove himself as a tough, stay-at-home defenceman. During the 2008 NHL playoffs, he played every game with a broken jaw and a separated shoulder.

In 2008, after a long negotiation with the Capitals, Morrisonn filed for arbitration as he wanted to stay with the team but could not come to an agreement on financial terms. On July 26, 2008, an arbitrator awarded a one-year contract worth $1.975 million.

On August 2, 2010 Morrisonn came to terms with the Buffalo Sabres on a two-year contract. Prior to his second season with the Sabres, on September 24, 2011 he was waived and later reassigned to the AHL affiliate Rochester Americans for the 2011–12 season.

Morrisonn played for HC Spartak Moscow on a one-year contract in the 2012–13 season.

In November 2019, Morrisonn moved to the UK to sign for EIHL side Cardiff Devils.

== Career statistics ==
=== Regular season and playoffs ===
			Regular season					Playoffs
Season	Team	League	GP	G	A	Pts	PIM	GP	G	A	Pts	PIM
1998–99	South Surrey Eagles	BCHL	19	0	2	2	13	1	0	0	0	0
1999–2000	Kamloops Blazers	WHL	57	1	6	7	80	4	0	0	0	6
2000–01	Kamloops Blazers	WHL	61	13	25	38	132	4	0	0	0	6
2001–02	Kamloops Blazers	WHL	61	11	26	37	106	4	0	2	2	2
2002–03	Providence Bruins	AHL	60	5	16	21	103	4	0	0	0	6
2002–03	Boston Bruins	NHL	11	0	0	0	8	—	—	—	—	—
2003–04	Providence Bruins	AHL	18	0	2	2	16	—	—	—	—	—
2003–04	Boston Bruins	NHL	30	1	7	8	10	—	—	—	—	—
2003–04	Washington Capitals	NHL	3	0	0	0	0	—	—	—	—	—
2003–04	Portland Pirates	AHL	13	1	4	5	10	7	0	1	1	4
2004–05	Portland Pirates	AHL	71	4	14	18	63	—	—	—	—	—
2005–06	Washington Capitals	NHL	80	1	13	14	91	—	—	—	—	—
2006–07	Washington Capitals	NHL	78	3	10	13	106	—	—	—	—	—
2007–08	Washington Capitals	NHL	76	1	9	10	63	7	0	1	1	6
2008–09	Washington Capitals	NHL	72	3	10	13	77	14	0	1	1	8
2009–10	Washington Capitals	NHL	68	1	11	12	68	5	0	0	0	2
2010–11	Buffalo Sabres	NHL	62	1	4	5	32	1	0	0	0	2
2011–12	Rochester Americans	AHL	65	4	11	15	44	1	0	0	0	0
2012–13	Spartak Moscow	KHL	46	1	3	4	26	—	—	—	—	—
2012–13	CSKA Moscow	KHL	2	1	1	2	0	7	0	2	2	0
2013–14	TPS	Liiga	54	4	12	16	83	—	—	—	—	—
2014–15	KHL Medveščak Zagreb	KHL	48	0	7	7	78	—	—	—	—	—
2015–16	KHL Medveščak Zagreb	KHL	51	1	6	7	107	—	—	—	—	—
2016–17	KHL Medveščak Zagreb	KHL	33	2	4	6	82	—	—	—	—	—
2016–17	Admiral Vladivostok	KHL	11	0	2	2	6	6	0	2	2	4
2017–18	Admiral Vladivostok	KHL	29	1	6	7	41	—	—	—	—	—
2018–19	Oji Eagles	ALH	32	2	7	9	40	3	0	0	0	0
2019–20	Cardiff Devils	EIHL	30	0	9	9	32	—	—	—	—	—
2020–21	Dubai Mighty Camels	UAE	1	0	0	0	0	—	—	—	—	—
AHL totals			227	14	47	61	236	12	0	1	1	10
NHL totals			480	11	64	75	455	27	0	2	2	18
KHL totals			220	6	29	35	340	13	0	4	4	4

=== International ===
Year	Team	Event	GP	G	A	Pts	PIM
2019	Croatia	WC D2A	5	2	4	6	26
Senior totals			5	2	4	6	26

Awards and achievements
Preceded by Martin Samuelsson	Boston Bruins first-round draft pick 2001	Succeeded by Hannu Toivonen
