= Martin Samuelsson =

Swedish ice hockey player (born 1982)

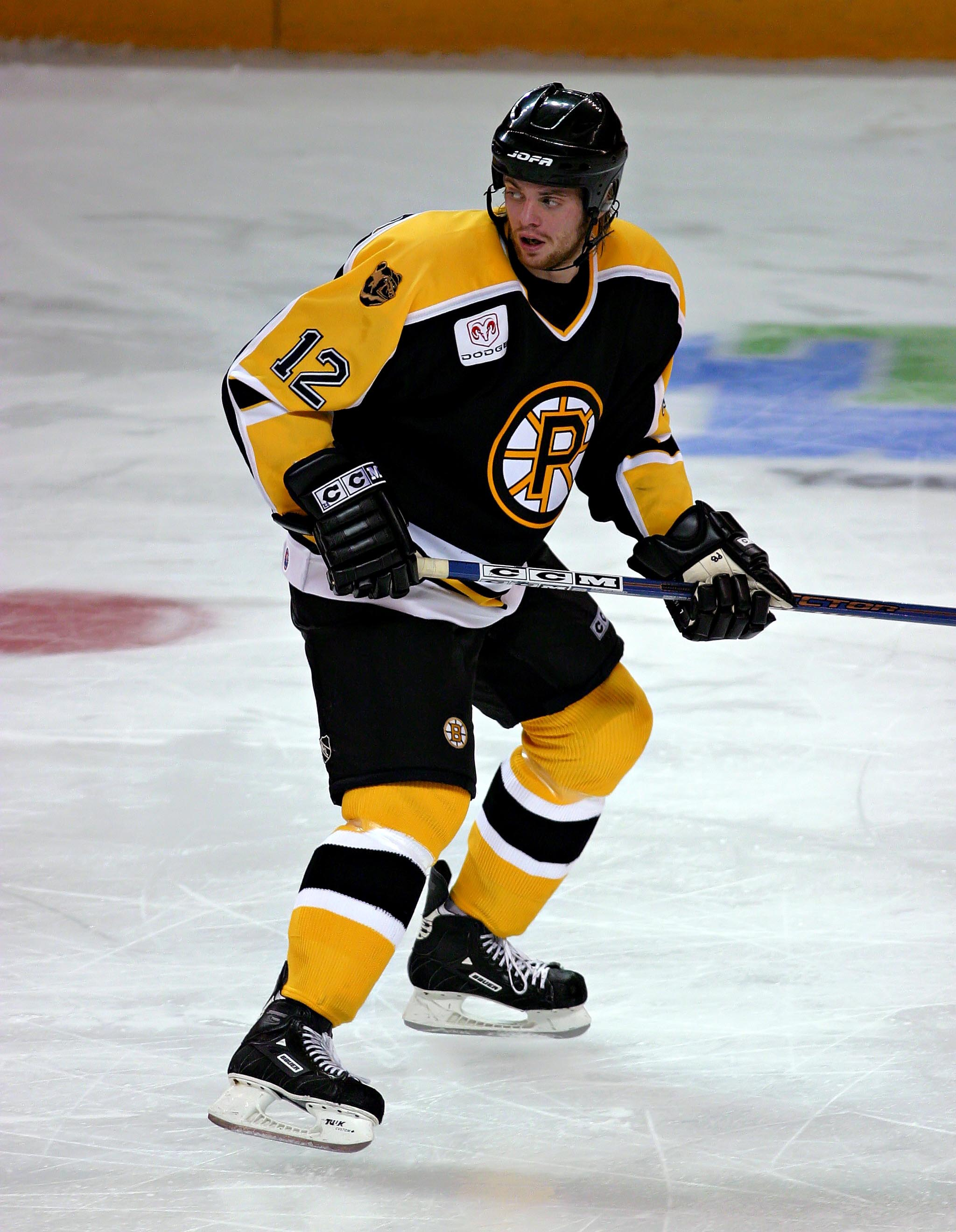
- Samuelsson with the Providence Bruins in 2004
- Born: January 25, 1982 (age 44) Upplands Väsby, Sweden
- Height: 6 ft 2 in (188 cm)
- Weight: 210 lb (95 kg; 15 st 0 lb)
- Position: Right wing
- Shot: Left
- Played for: Linköpings HC; Boston Bruins; Malmö Redhawks
- NHL draft: 27th overall, 2000; Boston Bruins
- Playing career: 2000–2008

Martin Tobias Samuelsson (born January 25, 1982) is a Swedish ice hockey retired player. He was drafted by the Boston Bruins in the first round, 27th overall, during the 2000 NHL entry draft and played 14 games in the National Hockey League between 2003 and 2004. The rest of his career, which lasted from 2000 to 2008, was spent in Sweden.

== Career statistics ==
=== Regular season and playoffs ===
			Regular season					Playoffs
Season	Team	League	GP	G	A	Pts	PIM	GP	G	A	Pts	PIM
1996–97	Hammarby IF	J20	6	1	1	2	0	—	—	—	—	—
1997–98	Hammarby IF	SWE-2 U20	20	13	12	25	—	—	—	—	—	—
1997–98	Hammarby IF	SWE-2	2	0	0	0	0	—	—	—	—	—
1998–99	Modo Hockey	J20	23	7	5	12	10	—	—	—	—	—
1999–2000	Modo Hockey	J20	19	9	8	17	18	2	1	0	1	2
1999–2000	Modo Hockey	J18 Allsv	—	—	—	—	—	6	3	0	3	4
2000–01	Hammarby IF	SWE-2	38	15	6	21	18	10	3	1	4	10
2001–02	Hammarby IF	SWE-2	44	13	10	23	45	2	0	0	0	2
2002–03	Boston Bruins	NHL	8	0	1	1	2	—	—	—	—	—
2002–03	Providence Bruins	AHL	64	24	15	39	34	4	0	0	0	0
2003–04	Boston Bruins	NHL	6	0	0	0	0	—	—	—	—	—
2003–04	Providence Bruins	AHL	56	1	9	10	15	1	0	0	0	0
2004–05	Providence Bruins	AHL	64	7	10	17	35	10	1	0	1	6
2005–06	Linköpings HC	SEL	44	3	4	7	45	8	0	0	0	29
2006–07	Linköpings HC	SEL	33	4	2	6	14	15	0	1	1	8
2007–08	Malmö Redhawks	SWE-2	41	4	4	8	76	3	0	0	0	0
AHL totals			184	32	34	66	84	15	1	0	1	6
NHL totals			14	0	1	1	2	—	—	—	—	—

=== International ===
Year	Team	Event	GP	G	A	Pts	PIM
1999	Sweden	WJC18	7	2	3	5	8
2000	Sweden	WJC18	6	3	5	8	6
2001	Sweden	WJC	7	3	0	3	2
2002	Sweden	WJC	7	1	1	2	4
Junior totals			27	9	9	18	20

Preceded by Lars Jonsson	Boston Bruins first-round draft pick 2000	Succeeded by Shaone Morrisonn
