= Jarno Kultanen =

Finnish ice hockey player (born 1973)

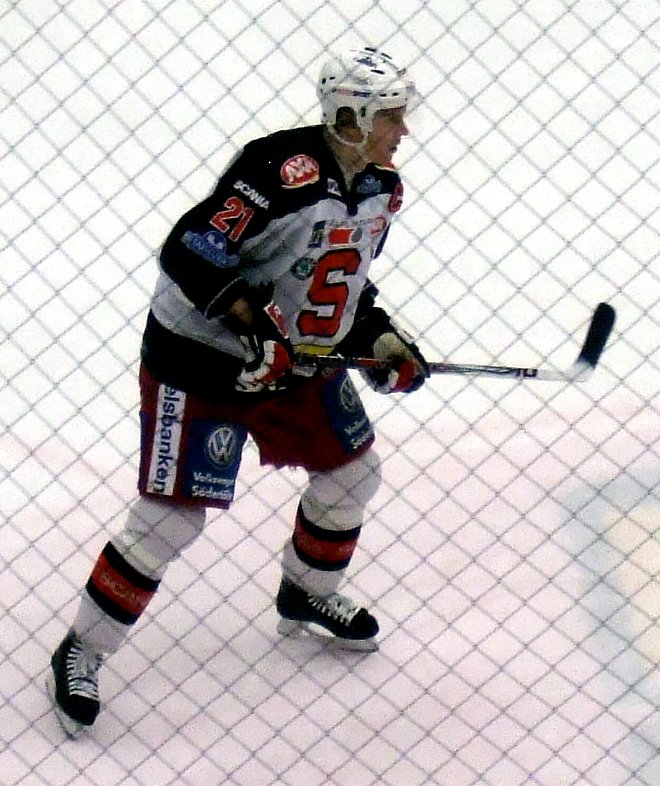
- Born: January 8, 1973 (age 52); Luumäki, Finland
- Height: 6 ft 2 in (188 cm)
- Weight: 198 lb (90 kg; 14 st 2 lb)
- Position: Defence
- Shot: Left
- Played for: KalPa; HIFK; KooKoo; Mora IK; Södertälje SK; Boston Bruins; Espoo Blues
- NHL draft: 174th overall, 2000; Boston Bruins
- Playing career: 1994–2010

Jarno Kultanen (born January 8, 1973) is a Finnish former professional ice hockey player who played between 1994 and 2010. He played in the SM-liiga for KalPa and HIFK, and in the National Hockey League for Boston Bruins. In Sweden played for Södertälje SK and Mora IK. After retiring from play he worked as a coach and later manager for KooKoo.

== Career statistics ==
			Regular season					Playoffs
Season	Team	League	GP	G	A	Pts	PIM	GP	G	A	Pts	PIM
1989–90	KooKoo	FIN-2 U20	—	—	—	—	—	3	0	0	0	0
1990–91	KooKoo	FIN-2 U20	26	2	12	14	22	—	—	—	—	—
1991–92	KooKoo	FIN-2	1	0	0	0	0	—	—	—	—	—
1992–93	KooKoo	FIN-2 U20	6	0	5	5	29	11	6	5	11	8
1992–93	KooKoo	FIN-2	21	1	0	1	6	6	0	1	1	2
1992–93	Centers Pietarsaari	FIN-2	1	1	0	1	0	—	—	—	—	—
1993–94	KooKoo	FIN U20	2	1	0	1	2	—	—	—	—	—
1993–94	KooKoo	FIN-2	45	7	10	17	42	—	—	—	—	—
1994–95	KalPa	SM-liiga	47	5	12	17	26	3	0	0	0	0
1995–96	KalPa	SM-liiga	49	4	10	14	42	—	—	—	—	—
1996–97	HIFK	SM-liiga	24	1	3	4	6	—	—	—	—	—
1997–98	HIFK	SM-liiga	25	0	1	1	20	8	0	1	1	2
1998–99	HIFK	SM-liiga	51	6	6	12	53	10	1	0	1	27
1999–00	HIFK	SM-liiga	46	6	8	14	51	9	0	0	0	6
2000–01	Boston Bruins	NHL	62	2	8	10	26	—	—	—	—	—
2001–02	Boston Bruins	NHL	38	0	3	3	33	—	—	—	—	—
2002–03	Boston Bruins	NHL	2	0	0	0	0	—	—	—	—	—
2002–03	Providence Bruins	AHL	59	9	25	34	35	4	0	0	0	6
2003–04	HIFK	SM-liiga	44	3	5	8	40	13	1	1	2	0
2004–05	HIFK	SM-liiga	56	6	3	9	45	5	1	0	1	25
2005–06	Mora IK	SEL	50	5	8	13	44	4	0	0	0	2
2006–07	Mora IK	SEL	55	2	9	11	64	3	0	1	1	8
2007–08	Södertälje SK	SEL	50	1	5	6	38	—	—	—	—	—
2008–09	KooKoo	Mestis	36	5	17	22	38	—	—	—	—	—
2008–09	Blues	SM-liiga	10	0	2	2	8	14	1	3	4	16
2009–10	KooKoo	Mestis	11	4	3	7	8	—	—	—	—	—
SM-liiga totals			352	31	50	81	291	62	4	5	9	76
NHL totals			102	2	11	13	59	—	—	—	—	—
