= Vladislav Evseev =

Russian professional ice hockey player

- Born: 10 September 1984 (age 41) Moscow, Russian SFSR, URS
- Height: 6 ft 2 in (188 cm)
- Weight: 196 lb (89 kg; 14 st 0 lb)
- Position: Left wing
- Shot: Left
- KHL team: Vityaz Chekhov
- NHL draft: 56th overall, 2002; Boston Bruins
- Playing career: 1999–2010

Vladislav Evseev (born 10 September 1984) is a Russian professional ice hockey player who currently plays for Vityaz Chekhov of the KHL. Evseev was selected by the Boston Bruins in the 2nd round (56th overall) of the 2002 NHL entry draft.

== Career statistics ==
=== Regular season and playoffs ===
			Regular season					Playoffs
Season	Team	League	GP	G	A	Pts	PIM	GP	G	A	Pts	PIM
2000–01	Dynamo–2 Moscow	RUS.3	9	6	3	9	0	—	—	—	—	—
2001–02	CSKA Moscow	RUS.2	15	2	5	7	10	—	—	—	—	—
2001–02	CSKA–2 Moscow	RUS.3	9	2	1	3	2	—	—	—	—	—
2002–03	Dynamo Moscow	RSL	22	1	1	2	2	1	0	0	0	0
2002–03	Dynamo–2 Moscow	RUS.3	24	6	10	16	31	—	—	—	—	—
2003–04	Dynamo Moscow	RSL	5	1	0	1	0	—	—	—	—	—
2003–04	Dynamo–2 Moscow	RUS.3	25	7	11	18	26	—	—	—	—	—
2003–04	Vityaz Podolsk	RUS.2	8	1	2	3	2	7	0	0	0	2
2004–05	Dynamo Moscow	RSL	12	1	1	2	2	—	—	—	—	—
2004–05	Dynamo–2 Moscow	RUS.3	15	5	6	11	29	—	—	—	—	—
2004–05	Salavat Yulaev Ufa	RSL	5	0	0	0	2	—	—	—	—	—
2005–06	Severstal Cherepovets	RSL	30	3	0	3	18	3	0	1	1	2
2005–06	Severstal–2 Cherepovets	RUS.3	16	5	9	14	2	—	—	—	—	—
2006–07	Dynamo Moscow	RSL	30	1	3	4	32	2	0	0	0	0
2006–07	Dynamo–2 Moscow	RUS.3	10	2	4	6	0	—	—	—	—	—
2007–08	Dynamo Moscow	RSL	3	0	0	0	12	—	—	—	—	—
2007–08	Dynamo–2 Moscow	RUS.3	15	15	7	22	14	—	—	—	—	—
2007–08	Vityaz Chekhov	RSL	30	5	5	10	10	—	—	—	—	—
2008–09	Vityaz Chekhov	KHL	52	4	3	7	16	—	—	—	—	—
2008–09	Vityaz–2 Chekhov	RUS.3	—	—	—	—	—	4	1	5	6	0
2009–10	Vityaz Chekhov	KHL	8	1	0	1	0	—	—	—	—	—
2009–10	Gazovik Tyumen	RUS.2	4	1	1	2	4	4	1	0	1	2
RUS.3 totals			123	48	51	99	104	4	1	5	6	0
RSL totals			137	12	10	22	78	6	0	1	1	2

=== International ===
Year	Team	Event	GP	G	A	Pts	PIM
2000	Russia	U17	6	1	2	3	4
2001	Russia	U17	5	5	3	8	6
2001	Russia	U18	5	1	3	4	29
Junior totals			16	7	8	15	39
