= Jay Henderson (ice hockey) =

Canadian ice hockey player

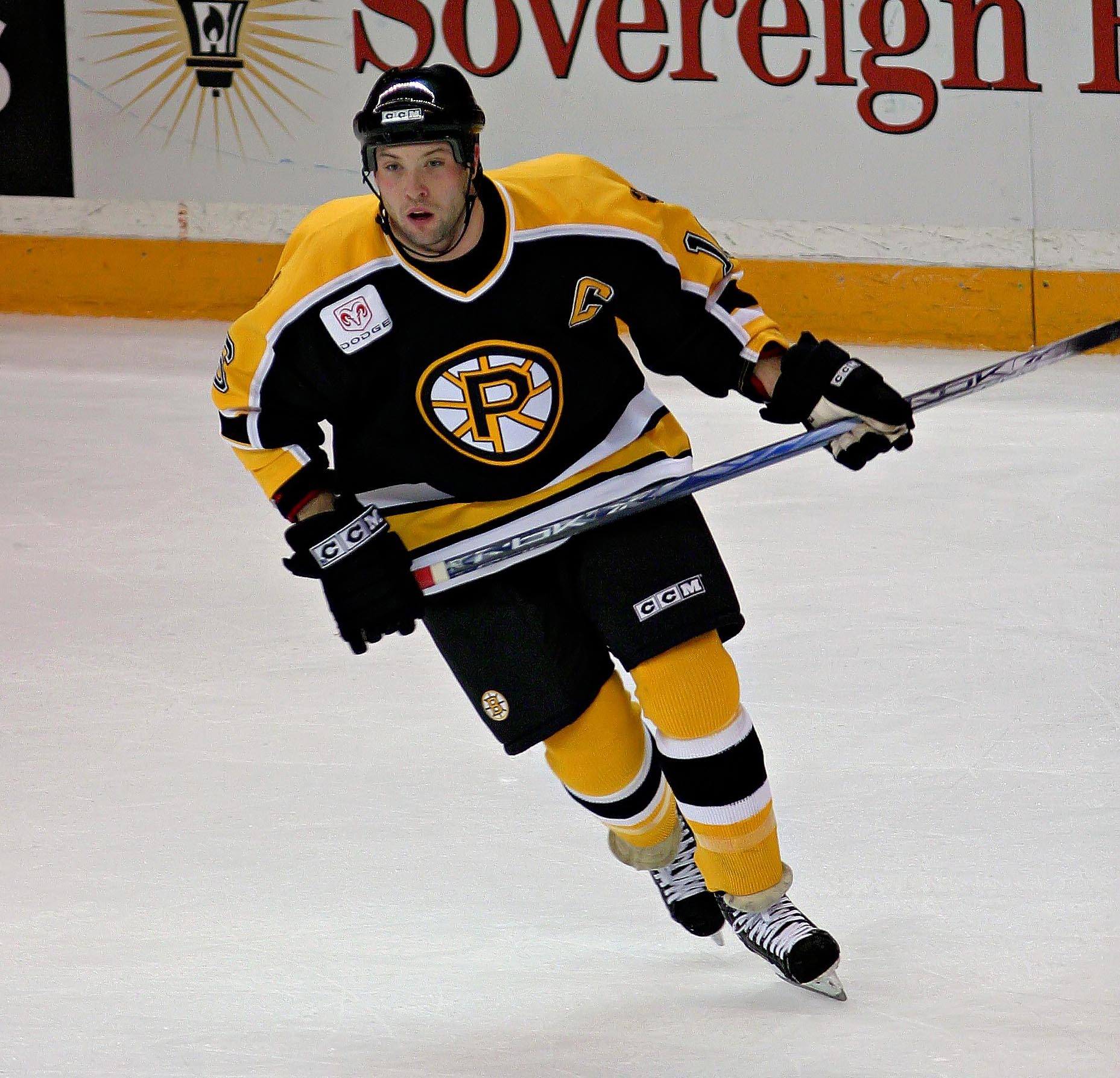
- Henderson with the Providence Bruins in 2004
- Born: September 17, 1978 (age 47) Edmonton, Alberta, Canada
- Height: 5 ft 11 in (180 cm)
- Weight: 190 lb (86 kg; 13 st 8 lb)
- Position: Left wing
- Shot: Left
- Played for: Boston Bruins; Augsburger Panther; Frankfurt Lions; HC TWK Innsbruck; Nottingham Panthers
- NHL draft: 246th overall, 1997; Boston Bruins
- Playing career: 1998–2010

Jay Elliot Henderson (born September 17, 1978) is a Canadian former professional ice hockey winger. Henderson was the final player drafted in the 1997 NHL entry draft, picked in the ninth round, 246th overall, by the Boston Bruins.

== Playing career ==
After playing four seasons in the Western Hockey League, with the Red Deer Rebels and Edmonton Ice, Henderson made his professional debut with the Bruins' American Hockey League affiliate, the Providence Bruins, in the 1997–98 season. He made his NHL debut with the Bruins during the 1998–99 season, appearing in four games. He appeared in 29 more games with the Bruins over the next two seasons. To date, he has no further NHL experience. In 33 career NHL games, Henderson recorded one goal and three assists.

Henderson played for Augsburger Panther and Frankfurt Lions of Germany's DEL during the 2005–06 and 2006–07 seasons.

In 2008–09 season, Henderson swapped Germany for Austria where he played for HC TWK Innsbruck

After playing in Europe for the previous few years, Henderson started the 2009–10 season at ECHL team Victoria Salmon Kings where he played only 2 games before moving to the Central Hockey League's Wichita Thunder. Henderson did not settle in Wichita and soon decided to accept a contract with British Elite Ice Hockey League's Nottingham Panthers in January 2010, where he settled into life as a Panther in time for the playoffs.

On May 15, 2010, Henderson signed a deal to return to play for the British Elite Ice Hockey League's Nottingham Panthers; this was short lived as he was sent home to recover from a back-neck injury.

== Coaching career ==
On June 27, 2013, Henderson was hired as an assistant coach for the Kootenay Ice of the Western Hockey League.

== Career statistics ==
			Regular season					Playoffs
Season	Team	League	GP	G	A	Pts	PIM	GP	G	A	Pts	PIM
1993–94	Sherwood Park Crusaders	AJHL	31	12	21	33	36	—	—	—	—	—
1994–95	Red Deer Rebels	WHL	54	3	9	12	80	—	—	—	—	—
1995–96	Red Deer Rebels	WHL	71	15	13	28	139	10	1	1	2	11
1996–97	Edmonton Ice	WHL	66	28	32	60	127	—	—	—	—	—
1997–98	Edmonton Ice	WHL	72	49	45	94	132	—	—	—	—	—
1997–98	Providence Bruins	AHL	11	3	1	4	11	—	—	—	—	—
1998–99	Providence Bruins	AHL	55	7	9	16	172	2	0	0	0	2
1998–99	Boston Bruins	NHL	4	0	0	0	2	—	—	—	—	—
1999–00	Providence Bruins	AHL	60	18	27	45	200	14	1	2	3	16
1999–00	Boston Bruins	NHL	16	1	3	4	9	—	—	—	—	—
2000–01	Providence Bruins	AHL	41	9	7	16	121	1	0	0	0	2
2000–01	Boston Bruins	NHL	13	0	0	0	26	—	—	—	—	—
2002–03	Providence Bruins	AHL	39	7	13	20	152	—	—	—	—	—
2002–03	Hartford Wolf Pack	AHL	14	3	4	7	27	—	—	—	—	—
2002–03	Houston Aeros	AHL	22	7	4	11	65	23	2	2	4	25
2003–04	Milwaukee Admirals	AHL	70	15	16	31	122	18	1	3	4	55
2004–05	Providence Bruins	AHL	72	8	10	18	235	17	1	4	5	56
2005–06	Augsburger Panther	DEL	42	16	6	22	108	—	—	—	—	—
2006–07	Augsburger Panther	DEL	35	14	14	28	38	—	—	—	—	—
2006–07	Frankfurt Lions	DEL	17	2	4	6	18	7	0	2	2	4
2007–08	Frankfurt Lions	DEL	55	22	24	46	36	12	3	2	5	12
2008–09	HC TWK Innsbruck	EBEL	50	14	18	32	104	6	0	1	1	12
2009–10	Victoria Salmon Kings	ECHL	2	0	0	0	19	—	—	—	—	—
2009–10	Wichita Thunder	CHL	16	1	3	4	57	—	—	—	—	—
2009–10	Nottingham Panthers	EIHL	14	3	7	10	20	3	1	0	1	38
NHL totals			33	1	3	4	37	—	—	—	—	—
