= John Grahame =

American ice hockey player (born 1975)

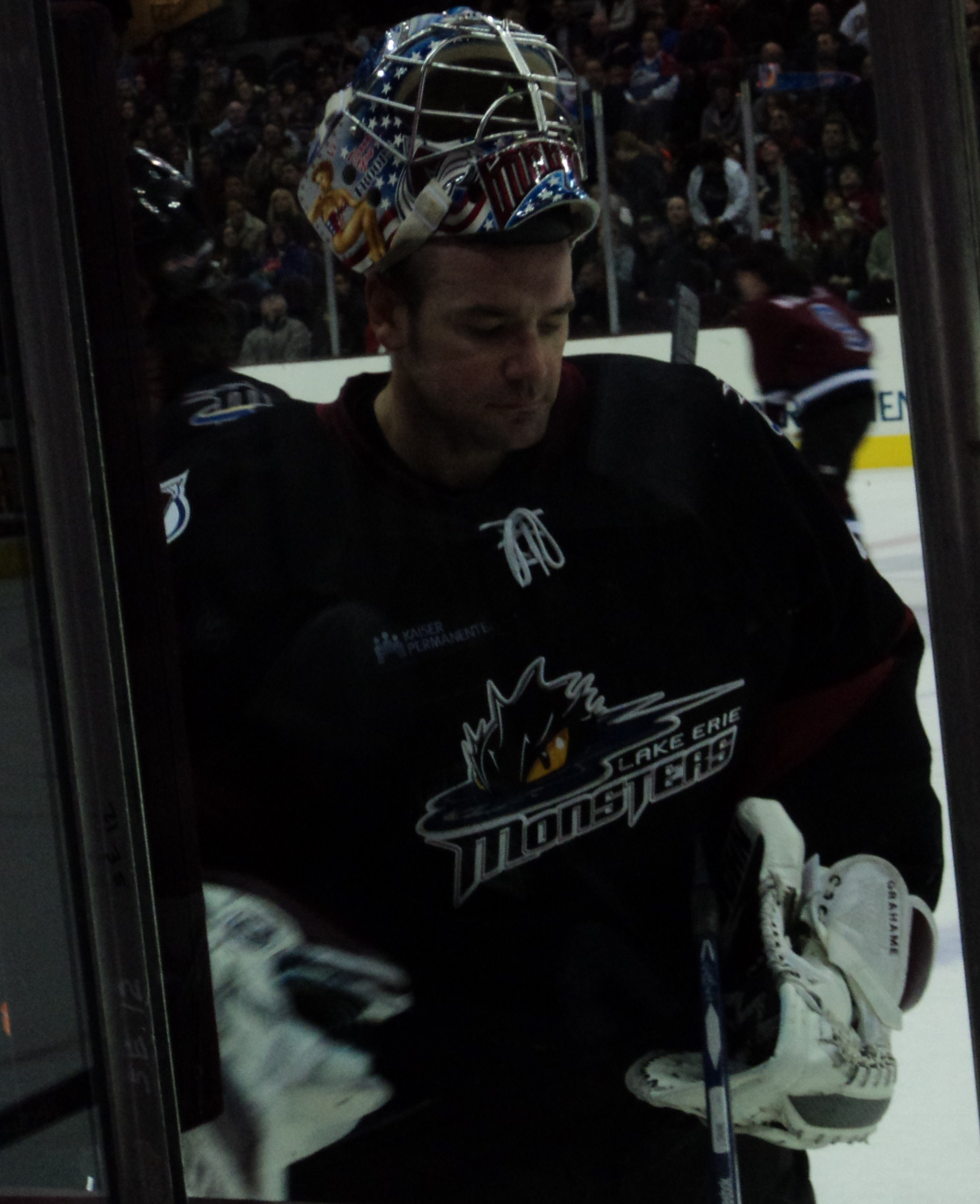
- Grahame with the Lake Erie Monsters in 2011
- Born: August 31, 1975 (age 50) Denver, Colorado, U.S.
- Height: 6 ft 2 in (188 cm)
- Weight: 220 lb (100 kg; 15 st 10 lb)
- Position: Goaltender
- Caught: Left
- Played for: Boston Bruins; Tampa Bay Lightning; Carolina Hurricanes; Avangard Omsk
- National team: United States
- NHL draft: 229th overall, 1994; Boston Bruins
- Playing career: 1997–2012

John Gillies Mark Grahame (born August 31, 1975) is an American former professional ice hockey goaltender who played in the National Hockey League with the Boston Bruins, Tampa Bay Lightning and Carolina Hurricanes. He won the Stanley Cup with the Tampa Bay Lightning in 2004.

== Playing career ==
Grahame played in the USHL for the Sioux City Musketeers before he was drafted in the ninth round, 229th overall by the Boston Bruins in the 1994 NHL entry draft. He then elected to play three years of collegiate hockey with the Lake Superior State Lakers of the CCHA, and would later become the only Lakers goaltender to play more than 50 games in the NHL or win the Stanley Cup.

John turned professional in the 1997–98 season, and was assigned by the Bruins to start for the Providence Bruins. In his second pro year, Grahame returned to the P-Bruins and took the team to the playoffs, leading them to victory in the Calder Cup.

In the 1999–2000 campaign, Grahame started the season back in Providence, but was called up to the Boston Bruins mid-season to back up Byron Dafoe in the Bruins' net, where he played credibly and was second in balloting to the league's all-rookie team. However, a broken ankle in the 2000 offseason took a long time to heal, and Grahame struggled to recapture his form. He played for the next three seasons in Boston before being traded midseason in 2003 to the Tampa Bay Lightning. The following season, Grahame returned to standard, having the best season of his career as a backup for the Stanley Cup-winning club. Grahame's presence allowed starter Nikolai Khabibulin to get extended rest when he needed.

He became Tampa Bay's starting goalie in the 2005–06 NHL season, but was criticized publicly by head coach John Tortorella after consecutive poor starts which contributed to the Lightning being eliminated in the first round of the Playoffs.

Grahame signed a two-year, $2.8 million contract with the Carolina Hurricanes on July 1, 2006. He was placed on waivers by the Hurricanes on January 4, 2008. The Hurricanes called up Michael Leighton from the team's AHL affiliate, the Albany River Rats, to replace him as the team's backup goaltender after Grahame began the season with a 4–6–1 record. The Hurricanes recalled Grahame on January 21.

During this time, Grahame played a single game for the United States Olympic team in the 2006 Winter Olympics, and also was the starter for the United States National Team in the 2007 World Championships.

In May 2008, after the conclusion of the Hurricanes' season, as a free agent, Grahame signed with Avangard Omsk of the new Kontinental Hockey League.

On December 12, 2009, Grahame signed a professional tryout contract for the 2009–10 season with the Philadelphia Flyers AHL affiliate, the Adirondack Phantoms. After playing in 12 games with the Phantoms, Grahame signed a contract with the Colorado Avalanche and was assigned to the injury-hit Lake Erie Monsters on March 3, 2010. He played in 14 games, recording only 4 wins, with the Monsters to finish the season and was re-signed on a one-year contract by the Avalanche on July 2, 2010.

He was brought up to the Avalanche on February 11, 2011, after Craig Anderson went back to Denver for personal reasons. He sat on the bench serving as Peter Budaj's backup for two contests and did not see any playing time. At the end of the 2010–11 season, he retired after the Monsters made it to the playoffs for the first time in their 4-year history.

On March 28, 2012, he briefly came out of retirement and signed a contract with the New York Islanders to serve as a backup for the injury depleted team through the remainder of the 2011–12 season. At the completion of the season he did not manage to feature in a game for the Islanders.

== Coaching career ==
On September 15, 2011, it was announced the Grahame would become the goaltending coach for the Sioux City Musketeers of the USHL, a team that he had previously played for in his career.

== Personal ==
He is the son of former professional goaltender Ron Grahame, who had been a goaltender in the WHA and NHL and had won the Avco Cup. His father was traded for the draft pick used to select John's future teammate Ray Bourque. His mother, Charlotte was a member of the front office of the Colorado Avalanche team that won the Stanley Cup. John and Charlotte are the first mother and son to get their names engraved on the Stanley Cup.

== Career statistics ==
=== Regular season and playoffs ===
			Regular season										Playoffs
Season	Team	League	GP	W	L	T	OTL	MIN	GA	SO	GAA	SV%	GP	W	L	MIN	GA	SO	GAA	SV%
1994–95	Lake Superior State	CCHA	28	16	7	3	—	1616	75	2	2.78	.887	—	—	—	—	—	—	—	—
1995–96	Lake Superior State	CCHA	29	21	4	2	—	1658	67	2	2.42	.904	—	—	—	—	—	—	—	—
1996–97	Lake Superior State	CCHA	37	19	3	4	—	2197	134	3	3.66	.876	—	—	—	—	—	—	—	—
1997–98	Providence Bruins	AHL	55	15	31	4	—	3053	164	3	3.22	.898	—	—	—	—	—	—	—	—
1998–99	Providence Bruins	AHL	48	37	9	1	—	2771	134	3	2.90	.896	19	15	4	1209	48	1	2.38	.912
1999–00	Providence Bruins	AHL	27	11	13	2	—	1528	86	1	3.38	.902	13	10	3	839	35	0	2.50	.917
1999–00	Boston Bruins	NHL	24	7	10	5	—	1344	55	2	2.46	.910	—	—	—	—	—	—	—	—
2000–01	Providence Bruins	AHL	16	4	7	3	—	893	47	0	3.16	.899	17	8	9	1043	46	2	2.65	.923
2000–01	Boston Bruins	NHL	10	3	4	0	—	471	28	0	3.57	.867	—	—	—	—	—	—	—	—
2001–02	Boston Bruins	NHL	19	8	7	2	—	1079	52	1	2.89	.897	—	—	—	—	—	—	—	—
2002–03	Boston Bruins	NHL	23	11	9	2	—	1352	61	1	2.71	.902	—	—	—	—	—	—	—	—
2002–03	Tampa Bay Lightning	NHL	17	6	5	4	—	914	34	2	2.23	.920	1	0	1	111	2	0	1.08	.958
2003–04	Tampa Bay Lightning	NHL	29	18	9	1	—	1688	58	1	2.06	.913	1	0	0	34	2	0	3.53	.882
2005–06	Tampa Bay Lightning	NHL	57	29	22	—	1	3152	161	5	3.06	.889	4	1	3	188	15	0	4.79	.847
2006–07	Carolina Hurricanes	NHL	28	10	13	—	2	1515	72	0	2.85	.897	—	—	—	—	—	—	—	—
2007–08	Carolina Hurricanes	NHL	17	5	7	—	1	848	53	0	3.75	.875	—	—	—	—	—	—	—	—
2007–08	Albany River Rats	AHL	7	4	3	—	0	415	21	0	3.04	.912	—	—	—	—	—	—	—	—
2008–09	Avangard Omsk	KHL	20	9	10	—	1	1195	57	3	2.86	.896	—	—	—	—	—	—	—	—
2009–10	Adirondack Phantoms	AHL	12	2	10	—	0	717	34	0	2.84	.896	—	—	—	—	—	—	—	—
2009–10	Lake Erie Monsters	AHL	14	4	7	—	3	837	48	0	3.44	.883	—	—	—	—	—	—	—	—
2010–11	Lake Erie Monsters	AHL	34	19	12	—	2	2009	80	1	2.39	.911	5	2	3	303	13	0	2.58	.918
NHL totals			224	97	86	14	4	12,363	574	12	2.79	.898	6	1	4	333	19	0	3.42	.883

== See also ==
- Notable families in the NHL

== Awards and honors ==
Award	Year
College
CCHA All-Tournament Team	1996
AHL
Calder Cup (Providence Bruins)	1999
NHL
Stanley Cup (Tampa Bay Lightning)	2004
