= Pavel Kolařík =

Czech ice hockey player

- Born: 24 October 1972 (age 53) Vyškov, Czechoslovakia
- Height: 6 ft 0 in (183 cm)
- Weight: 207 lb (94 kg; 14 st 11 lb)
- Position: Defence
- Shot: Left
- Played for: HC Slavia Praha; Boston Bruins
- National team: Czech Republic
- NHL draft: 268th overall, 2000; Boston Bruins
- Playing career: 1992–2018

Pavel Kolařík (born 24 October 1972) is a Czech former professional ice hockey defenceman.

Kolařík previously played for SKP Poprad and HC Kladno before joining HC Slavia Prague in 1996 where he spent four seasons. He was drafted 268th overall by the Boston Bruins in the 2000 NHL entry draft and played 23 games over two seasons. He scored no points and collected 10 penalty minutes. He spent most of his tenure in the American Hockey League with the Providence Bruins.

He returned to Slavia in 2002 and guided the team to their first championship in 2003. He would remain with the team until his retirement in 2018. He was 45 years old at the time of his retirement.

== Career statistics ==
=== Regular season and playoffs ===
| | | | Regular season | | | | | Playoffs |
| Season | Team | League | GP | G | A | Pts | PIM | GP | G | A | Pts | PIM |
|---|---|---|---|---|---|---|---|---|---|---|---|---|
| 1992–93 | TJ ŠKP PS Poprad | TCH | 5 | 0 | 1 | 1 | — | — | — | — | — | — |
| 1993–94 | HC H+S Beroun | CZE-2 | — | 7 | 2 | 9 | — | — | — | — | — | — |
| 1994–95 | HC H+S Beroun | CZE-2 | — | 7 | 8 | 15 | — | — | — | — | — | — |
| 1994–95 | HC Poldi Kladno | CZE | 1 | 0 | 0 | 0 | 0 | — | — | — | — | — |
| 1995–96 | HC Poldi Kladno | CZE | 6 | 0 | 0 | 0 | 2 | 3 | 0 | 0 | 0 | 2 |
| 1995–96 | HC H+S Beroun | CZE-2 | 45 | 7 | 7 | 14 | — | — | — | — | — | — |
| 1996–97 | HC Slavia Praha | CZE | 27 | 1 | 2 | 3 | 10 | 3 | 0 | 0 | 0 | 2 |
| 1996–97 | HC Berounští Medvědi | CZE-2 | 32 | 6 | 6 | 12 | — | — | — | — | — | — |
| 1997–98 | HC Slavia Praha | CZE | 51 | 0 | 4 | 4 | 22 | 5 | 0 | 0 | 0 | 2 |
| 1998–99 | HC Slavia Praha | CZE | 51 | 0 | 8 | 8 | 44 | — | — | — | — | — |
| 1999–00 | HC Slavia Praha | CZE | 52 | 5 | 3 | 8 | 44 | — | — | — | — | — |
| 2000–01 | Boston Bruins | NHL | 10 | 0 | 0 | 0 | 4 | — | — | — | — | — |
| 2000–01 | Providence Bruins | AHL | 51 | 5 | 6 | 11 | 14 | 17 | 0 | 4 | 4 | 4 |
| 2001–02 | Boston Bruins | NHL | 13 | 0 | 0 | 0 | 6 | — | — | — | — | — |
| 2001–02 | Providence Bruins | AHL | 47 | 3 | 4 | 7 | 10 | 2 | 0 | 0 | 0 | 2 |
| 2002–03 | HC Slavia Praha | CZE | 52 | 7 | 4 | 11 | 22 | 17 | 2 | 1 | 3 | 10 |
| 2003–04 | HC Slavia Praha | CZE | 46 | 4 | 3 | 7 | 32 | 10 | 0 | 1 | 1 | 4 |
| 2004–05 | HC Slavia Praha | CZE | 52 | 0 | 5 | 5 | 42 | 7 | 1 | 0 | 1 | 4 |
| 2005–06 | HC Slavia Praha | CZE | 51 | 2 | 1 | 3 | 28 | 15 | 0 | 0 | 0 | 2 |
| 2006–07 | HC Slavia Praha | CZE | 48 | 1 | 4 | 5 | 105 | 6 | 0 | 0 | 0 | 29 |
| 2007–08 | HC Slavia Praha | CZE | 52 | 1 | 2 | 3 | 50 | 18 | 0 | 0 | 0 | 8 |
| 2008–09 | HC Slavia Praha | CZE | 52 | 1 | 4 | 5 | 42 | 17 | 0 | 3 | 3 | 2 |
| 2009–10 | HC Slavia Praha | CZE | 52 | 1 | 2 | 3 | 59 | 16 | 0 | 1 | 1 | 6 |
| 2010–11 | HC Slavia Praha | CZE | 51 | 1 | 1 | 2 | 28 | 19 | 1 | 1 | 2 | 1 |
| 2011–12 | HC Slavia Praha | CZE | 52 | 1 | 2 | 3 | 22 | — | — | — | — | — |
| 2012–13 | HC Slavia Praha | CZE | 48 | 2 | 2 | 4 | 24 | 11 | 0 | 1 | 1 | 16 |
| 2013–14 | HC Slavia Praha | CZE | 50 | 2 | 5 | 7 | 36 | 5 | 0 | 2 | 2 | 4 |
| 2014–15 | HC Slavia Praha | CZE | 44 | 1 | 1 | 2 | 44 | — | — | — | — | — |
| 2015–16 | HC Slavia Praha | CZE | 36 | 0 | 3 | 3 | 18 | 4 | 0 | 0 | 0 | 0 |
| 2016–17 | HC Kobra Praha | CZE-3 | 6 | 0 | 2 | 2 | 4 | — | — | — | — | — |
| 2016–17 | HC Slavia Praha | CZE-2 | 31 | 1 | 4 | 5 | 22 | 9 | 0 | 0 | 0 | 2 |
| 2017–18 | HC Slavia Praha | CZE-2 | 22 | 0 | 2 | 2 | 10 | 2 | 0 | 1 | 1 | 0 |
| 2017–18 | HC Kobra Praha | CZE-3 | 12 | 1 | 4 | 5 | 4 | 3 | 0 | 0 | 0 | 4 |
| CZE totals | | | 838 | 30 | 53 | 83 | 656 | 152 | 4 | 10 | 14 | 103 |
| NHL totals | | | 23 | 0 | 0 | 0 | 10 | — | — | — | — | — |

=== International ===
| Year | Team | Event | GP | G | A | Pts | PIM |
|---|---|---|---|---|---|---|---|
| 2003 | Czech Republic | WC | 5 | 0 | 1 | 1 | 2 |
| Senior totals | | | 5 | 0 | 1 | 1 | 2 |
