= Dmitri Utkin =

Russian ice hockey player

- Born: July 10, 1984 (age 41) Yaroslavl, Soviet Union
- Height: 6 ft 0 in (183 cm)
- Weight: 183 lb (83 kg; 13 st 1 lb)
- Position: Forward
- Shot: Left
- Played for: RSL; Lokomotiv Yaroslavl; HC Spartak Moscow; Traktor Chelyabinsk
- NHL draft: 228th overall, 2002; Boston Bruins
- Playing career: 2002–2018

Dmitri Utkin (born July 10, 1984) is a Russian former professional ice hockey player. He was selected by the Boston Bruins in the 7th round (228th overall) of the 2002 NHL entry draft.

== Career statistics ==
| | | | Regular season | | | | | Playoffs |
| Season | Team | League | GP | G | A | Pts | PIM | GP | G | A | Pts | PIM |
|---|---|---|---|---|---|---|---|---|---|---|---|---|
| 2000–01 | Lokomotiv–2 Yaroslavl | RUS.3 | 35 | 6 | 7 | 13 | 14 | — | — | — | — | — |
| 2001–02 | Lokomotiv–2 Yaroslavl | RUS.3 | 32 | 15 | 7 | 22 | 33 | — | — | — | — | — |
| 2002–03 | Lokomotiv Yaroslavl | RSL | 4 | 0 | 1 | 1 | 0 | — | — | — | — | — |
| 2002–03 | Lokomotiv–2 Yaroslavl | RUS.3 | 40 | 14 | 12 | 26 | 12 | — | — | — | — | — |
| 2003–04 | Spartak Moscow | RUS.2 | 57 | 10 | 10 | 20 | 8 | 13 | 3 | 3 | 6 | 2 |
| 2003–04 | Spartak–2 Moscow | RUS.3 | 7 | 3 | 2 | 5 | 6 | — | — | — | — | — |
| 2004–05 | Keramin Minsk | BLR | 8 | 2 | 0 | 2 | 31 | — | — | — | — | — |
| 2004–05 | Keramin–2 Minsk | BLR.2 | 2 | 4 | 0 | 4 | 0 | — | — | — | — | — |
| 2004–05 | HK Brest | BLR | 20 | 4 | 12 | 16 | 4 | — | — | — | — | — |
| 2004–05 | HK–2 Brest | BLR.2 | 1 | 0 | 1 | 1 | 0 | — | — | — | — | — |
| 2004–05 | HK Rīga 2000 | LAT | — | — | — | — | — | 6 | 3 | 2 | 5 | 0 |
| 2004–05 | HK Rīga 2000 | BLR | — | — | — | — | — | 3 | 0 | 0 | 0 | 0 |
| 2005–06 | Spartak Moscow | RSL | 33 | 3 | 1 | 4 | 4 | 2 | 0 | 0 | 0 | 0 |
| 2005–06 | Spartak–2 Moscow | RUS.3 | 14 | 7 | 2 | 9 | 12 | — | — | — | — | — |
| 2006–07 | Traktor Chelyabinsk | RSL | 50 | 6 | 8 | 14 | 20 | — | — | — | — | — |
| 2006–07 | Traktor–2 Chelyabinsk | RUS.3 | 1 | 0 | 0 | 0 | 0 | — | — | — | — | — |
| 2007–08 | Traktor Chelyabinsk | RSL | 5 | 1 | 0 | 1 | 2 | — | — | — | — | — |
| 2007–08 | Traktor–2 Chelyabinsk | RUS.3 | 16 | 3 | 3 | 6 | 2 | — | — | — | — | — |
| 2007–08 | Avtomobilist Yekaterinburg | RUS.2 | 12 | 2 | 0 | 2 | 0 | 6 | 1 | 0 | 1 | 0 |
| 2007–08 | Avtomobilist–2 Yekaterinburg | RUS.3 | 1 | 1 | 0 | 1 | 0 | — | — | — | — | — |
| 2008–09 | Mechel Chelyabinsk | RUS.2 | 40 | 13 | 8 | 21 | 40 | — | — | — | — | — |
| 2008–09 | HC Yugra | RUS.2 | 8 | 4 | 3 | 7 | 0 | 16 | 2 | 7 | 9 | 4 |
| 2009–10 | HC Yugra | RUS.2 | 22 | 5 | 3 | 8 | 4 | — | — | — | — | — |
| 2009–10 | Toros Neftekamsk | RUS.2 | 19 | 3 | 1 | 4 | 0 | 13 | 3 | 3 | 6 | 2 |
| 2010–11 | Sputnik Nizhny Tagil | VHL | 54 | 10 | 18 | 28 | 12 | 4 | 0 | 2 | 2 | 0 |
| 2011–12 | Sputnik Nizhny Tagil | VHL | 53 | 10 | 16 | 26 | 10 | 4 | 0 | 3 | 3 | 0 |
| 2012–13 | Chelmet Chelyabinsk | VHL | 52 | 13 | 19 | 32 | 6 | — | — | — | — | — |
| 2013–14 | Lada Togliatti | VHL | 2 | 0 | 0 | 0 | 0 | — | — | — | — | — |
| 2013–14 | THK Tver | VHL | 32 | 5 | 7 | 12 | 8 | 3 | 0 | 0 | 0 | 0 |
| 2014–15 | Zauralie Kurgan | VHL | 50 | 8 | 12 | 20 | 22 | 4 | 0 | 0 | 0 | 0 |
| 2015–16 | Yuzhny Ural Orsk | VHL | 11 | 0 | 2 | 2 | 2 | — | — | — | — | — |
| 2015–16 | Izhstal Izhevsk | VHL | 22 | 2 | 6 | 8 | 2 | 3 | 0 | 0 | 0 | 2 |
| 2016–17 | Shakhtyor Soligorsk | BLR | 8 | 2 | 1 | 3 | 0 | — | — | — | — | — |
| 2017–18 | Sputnik Nizhny Tagil | VHL | 10 | 0 | 2 | 2 | 4 | — | — | — | — | — |
| 2017–18 | HC 07 Detva | SVK | 13 | 1 | 1 | 2 | 2 | — | — | — | — | — |
| 2017–18 | HC Prešov Penguins | SVK.2 | 4 | 1 | 1 | 2 | 4 | — | — | — | — | — |
| RSL totals | | | 92 | 10 | 10 | 20 | 26 | 2 | 0 | 0 | 0 | 0 |
| RUS.2 totals | | | 158 | 35 | 27 | 62 | 52 | 48 | 9 | 13 | 22 | 8 |
| VHL totals | | | 286 | 48 | 82 | 130 | 66 | 18 | 0 | 5 | 5 | 2 |
