= Jonathan Girard =

Canadian ice hockey player

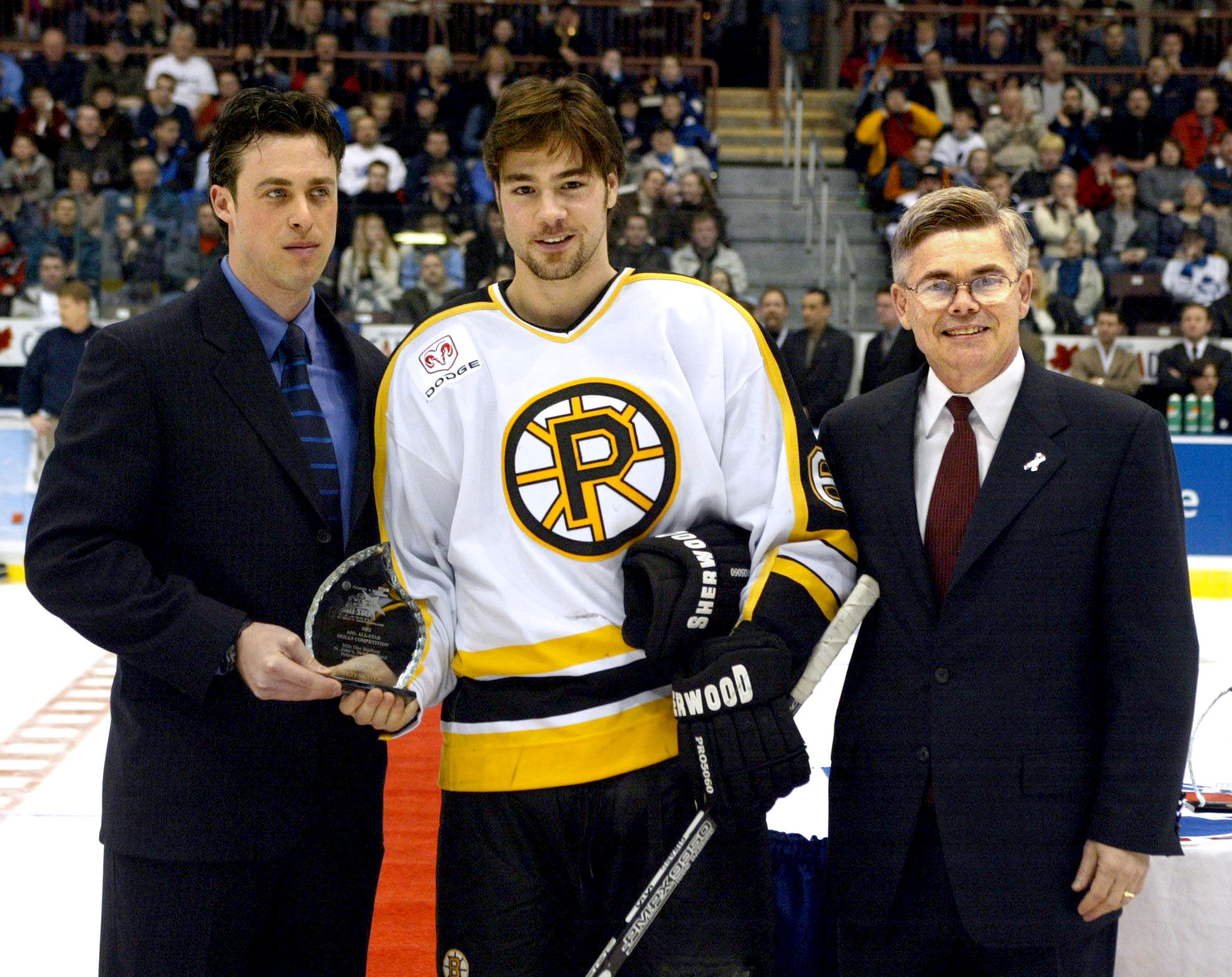
- Girard with the Providence Bruins in 2002
- Born: May 27, 1980 (age 46) Rawdon, Quebec, Canada
- Height: 5 ft 11 in (180 cm)
- Weight: 196 lb (89 kg; 14 st 0 lb)
- Position: Defence
- Shot: Right
- Played for: Boston Bruins
- NHL draft: 48th overall, 1998; Boston Bruins
- Playing career: 1998–2005

Jonathan Girard (born May 27, 1980) is a Canadian former professional ice hockey player, who played for the Boston Bruins of the NHL. Girard was born in Rawdon, Quebec and raised in Joliette, Quebec.

== Playing career ==
As a youth, Girard played in the 1993 and 1994 Quebec International Pee-Wee Hockey Tournaments with the Sélects-du-Nord minor ice hockey team.

A defenceman, Girard played junior hockey for the Laval Titan Collège Français (later the Acadie-Bathurst Titan) of the QMJHL and was drafted in the second round, 48th overall, by the Bruins in 1998).

He played 150 games over five seasons with Boston, scoring 10 goals and recording 34 assists. He also spent time with the Moncton Wildcats of the QMJHL and the Providence Bruins, Boston's AHL affiliate.

On July 24, 2003, Girard was driving near his hometown in Quebec when he lost control of his car and it flipped over. Girard required surgery for a broken pelvis. While at the time it was not known if Girard would ever play hockey again, he showed tremendous resilience in returning to skating at the Bruins' practice facility in Wilmington, Massachusetts in March, 2004. However, the loss of the 2004–05 NHL season due to a lockout nullified his attempt at a return to hockey that year.

Girard signed a one-year contract with the Bruins on August 10, 2005, and played one game with Providence in the AHL on October 15, 2005. On November 30, Girard announced his decision to retire, having fully recovered from his injuries but unable to play professional hockey again.

== Career statistics ==
			Regular season					Playoffs
Season	Team	League	GP	G	A	Pts	PIM	GP	G	A	Pts	PIM
1996–97	Laval Titan College Francias	QMJHL	39	11	21	32	23	3	0	3	3	0
1997–98	Laval Titan College Francias	QMJHL	64	20	47	67	44	16	2	16	18	13
1998–99	Boston Bruins	NHL	3	0	0	0	0	—	—	—	—	—
1998–99	Acadie-Bathurst Titan	QMJHL	50	9	58	67	60	23	13	18	31	22
1999–00	Boston Bruins	NHL	23	1	2	3	2	—	—	—	—	—
1999–00	Moncton Wildcats	QMJHL	26	10	25	35	36	16	3	15	18	36
1999–00	Providence Bruins	AHL	5	0	1	1	0	—	—	—	—	—
2000–01	Boston Bruins	NHL	31	3	13	16	14	—	—	—	—	—
2000–01	Providence Bruins	AHL	39	3	21	24	6	17	0	5	5	4
2001–02	Boston Bruins	NHL	20	0	3	3	9	1	0	0	0	2
2001–02	Providence Bruins	AHL	59	6	31	37	36	2	0	0	0	2
2002–03	Boston Bruins	NHL	73	6	16	22	21	2	0	1	1	0
2005–06	Providence Bruins	AHL	1	0	0	0	0	—	—	—	—	—
NHL totals			150	10	34	44	46	3	0	1	1	2
