= Vladislav Kara =

Russian ice hockey player

- Born: 20 April 1998 (age 28) Tynda, Russia
- Height: 6 ft 2 in (188 cm)
- Weight: 205 lb (93 kg; 14 st 9 lb)
- Position: Forward
- Shoots: Left
- KHL team Former teams: HC Sochi; Ak Bars Kazan; Severstal Cherepovets; Spartak Moscow; HC Yugra; HC Vityaz; Sibir Novosibirsk; Admiral Vladivostok
- NHL draft: 124th overall, 2017; Toronto Maple Leafs
- Playing career: 2017–present

Vladislav Kara (born 20 April 1998) is a Russian professional ice hockey player who currently plays for HC Sochi of the Kontinental Hockey League (KHL). He was selected by the Toronto Maple Leafs in the fourth round, 124th overall, in the 2017 NHL entry draft.

== Playing career ==
Kara played as a youth and later made his professional debut with Ak Bars Kazan in the 2017–18 season. Following his third KHL season with Ak Bars, unable to cement a full-time role on the roster, Kara was traded to fellow KHL club Severstal Cherepovets in exchange for financial compensation on 17 July 2020.

In the following 2020–21 season, Kara made 17 appearances with Severstal, posting 1 goal and 3 points. He was also assigned to the VHL farm club, Molot-Prikamye Perm, collecting 4 points through 14 games. On 27 December 2020, Kara's brief tenure with Severstal ended as he was mutually released from his contract to sign a two-way contract with HC Spartak Moscow for the remainder of the season.

Following a full season in the VHL with HC Yugra, Kara returned to the KHL for the 2022–23 season in securing a contract with his former club, Severstal Cherepovets, on 5 May 2022. Before re-joining Severstal, Kara was again on the move after he was traded to HC Vityaz in exchange for financial compensation on 13 July 2022.

At the start of the 2024–25 season, Kara began the campaign with Vityaz but was dealt to HC Sibir Novosibirsk on September 11, 2024, in a trade that saw the rights to Pavel Jenyš sent the other way.

On 26 August 2026, after initially signing with Dynamo St. Petersburg of the VHL, Kara secured a one-year contract in the KHL with HC Sochi for the 2026–27 season.

== Career statistics ==
			Regular season					Playoffs
Season	Team	League	GP	G	A	Pts	PIM	GP	G	A	Pts	PIM
2014–15	Draguny Mozhaysk	MHLB	40	21	27	48	109	—	—	—	—	—
2014–15	HK Trnava	Slovak U18 2	9	9	16	25	24	—	—	—	—	—
2015–16	Irbis Kazan	MHL	41	4	9	13	22	—	—	—	—	—
2016–17	Irbis Kazan	MHL	31	11	9	20	10	7	4	1	5	4
2016–17	Bars Kazan	VHL	34	3	5	8	4	—	—	—	—	—
2017–18	Irbis Kazan	MHL	2	1	2	3	0	5	2	3	5	0
2017–18	Bars Kazan	VHL	33	9	6	15	12	—	—	—	—	—
2017–18	Ak Bars Kazan	KHL	11	0	0	0	0	—	—	—	—	—
2018–19	Ak Bars Kazan	KHL	41	3	2	5	4	—	—	—	—	—
2018–19	Bars Kazan	VHL	25	5	11	16	8	—	—	—	—	—
2018–19	Irbis Kazan	MHL	4	2	4	6	2	—	—	—	—	—
2019–20	Ak Bars Kazan	KHL	27	4	4	8	12	—	—	—	—	—
2019–20	Bars Kazan	VHL	25	7	14	21	16	9	3	3	6	8
2020–21	Severstal Cherepovets	KHL	17	1	2	3	0	—	—	—	—	—
2020–21	Molot-Prikamie Perm	VHL	14	2	2	4	25	—	—	—	—	—
2020–21	Spartak Moscow	KHL	6	0	0	0	0	4	0	0	0	0
2020–21	Khimik Voskresensk	VHL	3	0	1	1	2	3	0	0	0	4
2021–22	HC Yugra	VHL	30	17	11	28	25	15	3	2	5	0
2022–23	HC Vityaz	KHL	67	20	15	35	11	5	0	2	2	2
2023–24	HC Vityaz	KHL	52	6	8	14	6	—	—	—	—	—
2024–25	HC Vityaz	KHL	1	0	0	0	0	—	—	—	—	—
2024–25	Sibir Novosibirsk	KHL	57	12	13	25	10	7	1	3	4	0
2025–26	Sibir Novosibirsk	KHL	31	4	2	6	7	—	—	—	—	—
2025–26	Admiral Vladivostok	KHL	10	0	0	0	6	—	—	—	—	—
KHL totals			320	50	46	96	56	16	1	5	6	2
