= 2002 NHL entry draft =

2002 North American ice hockey draft

General information
- Date: June 22–23, 2002
- Location: Air Canada Centre; Toronto, Ontario, Canada

Overview
- 291 total selections in 9 rounds
- First selection: (Canada) Rick Nash (Columbus Blue Jackets)
- Hall of Famers: 1: D Duncan Keith

The 2002 NHL entry draft was the 40th draft for the National Hockey League. It was held on June 22 and 23, 2002, at the Air Canada Centre in Toronto. In total, 291 players were drafted: 35 from the Ontario Hockey League (OHL); 23 from the Quebec Major Junior Hockey League (QMJHL); 43 from the Western Hockey League (WHL); 41 from the National Collegiate Athletic Association (NCAA) hockey conferences; six from U.S. high schools and 110 from outside North America.

The last active player in the NHL from this draft class was Duncan Keith, who played his last NHL game in the 2021–22 season.

== Final central scouting rankings ==
=== Skaters ===
	North American	European
1	(Canada) Rick Nash (Left wing)	(Finland) Joni Pitkanen (defence)
2	(Canada) Jay Bouwmeester (defence)	(Russia) Alexander Semin (left wing)
3	(United States) Ryan Whitney (defence)	(Czech Republic) Jiri Hudler (centre)
4	(Canada) Joffrey Lupul (centre)	(Russia) Denis Grebeshkov (defence)
5	(Canada) Scottie Upshall (right wing)	(Czech Republic) Michal Barinka (defence)
6	(Canada) Steve Eminger (defence)	(Russia) Kirill Koltsov (defence)
7	(Czech Republic) Petr Taticek (centre)	(Russia) Anton Babchuk (defence)
8	(Czech Republic) Martin Vagner (centre)	(Russia) Sergei Anshakov (defence)
9	(United States) Chris Higgins (centre)	(Russia) Alexei Kaigorodov (centre)
10	(Canada) Pierre-Marc Bouchard (centre)	(Czech Republic) Jakub Koreis (centre)

=== Goaltenders ===
	North American	European
1	(Canada) Jeff Drouin-Deslauriers	(Finland) Kari Lehtonen
2	(Canada) Todd Ford	(Switzerland) Tobias Stephan
3	(Canada) Maxime Daigneault	(Finland) Hannu Toivonen

== Selections by round ==
= NHL All-Star team ·	= NHL All-Star (Note: Players are identified as an All-Star if they were selected for the All-Star game at any time in their career.) ·	= NHL All-Star and NHL All-Star team ·	= Hall of Famers

=== Round one ===
#	Player	Nationality	NHL team	College/junior/club team
1	Rick Nash (LW)	Canada	Columbus Blue Jackets (from Florida)^{1}	London Knights (OHL)
2	Kari Lehtonen (G)	Finland	Atlanta Thrashers	Jokerit (Finland)
3	Jay Bouwmeester (D)	Canada	Florida Panthers (from Columbus)^{2}	Medicine Hat Tigers (WHL)
4	Joni Pitkanen (D)	Finland	Philadelphia Flyers (from Tampa Bay)^{3}	Karpat (Finland)
5	Ryan Whitney (D)	United States	Pittsburgh Penguins	Boston University (Hockey East)
6	Scottie Upshall (LW)	Canada	Nashville Predators	Kamloops Blazers (WHL)
7	Joffrey Lupul (RW)	Canada	Mighty Ducks of Anaheim	Medicine Hat Tigers (WHL)
8	Pierre-Marc Bouchard (C)	Canada	Minnesota Wild	Chicoutimi Sagueneens (QMJHL)
9	Petr Taticek (C)	Czech Republic	Florida Panthers (from Calgary)^{4}	Sault Ste. Marie Greyhounds (OHL)
10	Eric Nystrom (LW)	United States	Calgary Flames (from NY Rangers via Florida)^{5}	University of Michigan (Big Ten)
11	Keith Ballard (D)	United States	Buffalo Sabres	University of Minnesota (Big Ten)
12	Steve Eminger (D)	Canada	Washington Capitals	Kitchener Rangers (OHL)
13	Alexander Semin (RW)	Russia	Washington Capitals (from Dallas)^{6}	Traktor Chelyabinsk Jrs. (Russia)
14	Chris Higgins (LW)	United States	Montreal Canadiens (from Edmonton)^{7}	Yale University (ECAC)
15	Jesse Niinimaki (C)	Finland	Edmonton Oilers (from Montreal)^{8}	Ilves (Finland)
16	Jakub Klepis (C)	Czech Republic	Ottawa Senators	Portland Winterhawks (WHL)
17	Boyd Gordon (C)	Canada	Washington Capitals (from Vancouver)^{9}	Red Deer Rebels (WHL)
18	Denis Grebeshkov (D)	Russia	Los Angeles Kings	Lokomotiv Yaroslavl (Russia)
19	Jakub Koreis (C)	Czech Republic	Phoenix Coyotes	HC Plzen (Czech Republic)
20	Daniel Paille (LW)	Canada	Buffalo Sabres (from New Jersey via Dallas and Columbus)^{10}	Guelph Storm (OHL)
21	Anton Babchuk (D)	Russia	Chicago Blackhawks	Elemash Elektrostal (Russia)
22	Sean Bergenheim (LW)	Finland	New York Islanders	Jokerit (Finland)
23	Ben Eager (LW)	Canada	Phoenix Coyotes (from St. Louis)^{11}	Oshawa Generals (OHL)
24	Alexander Steen (LW)	Sweden	Toronto Maple Leafs	Vastra Frolunda HC (Sweden)
25	Cam Ward (G)	Canada	Carolina Hurricanes	Red Deer Rebels (WHL)
26	Martin Vagner (D)	Czech Republic	Dallas Stars (from Philadelphia via Washington)^{12}	Hull Olympiques (QMJHL)
27	Mike Morris (RW)	United States	San Jose Sharks	Saint Sebastian's School (USHS–MA)
28	Jonas Johansson (RW)	Sweden	Colorado Avalanche	HV71 (Sweden)
29	Hannu Toivonen (G)	Finland	Boston Bruins	HPK (Finland)
30	Jim Slater (C)	United States	Atlanta Thrashers (from Detroit via Buffalo and Columbus)^{13}	Michigan State University (Big Ten)

1. Florida's first-round pick went to Columbus as the result of a trade on June 22, 2002 that sent a first-round pick (# 3 overall) and future considerations (Florida's option to swap first-round picks in the 2003 entry draft to Florida in exchange for this pick.
2. Columbus' first-round pick went to Florida as the result of a trade on June 22, 2002 that sent a first-round pick (# 1 overall) to Columbus in exchange for future considerations (Florida's option to swap first-round picks in the 2003 entry draft and this pick.
3. Tampa Bay's first-round pick went to Philadelphia as the result of a trade on June 21, 2002 that sent Ruslan Fedotenko and two second-round picks (# 34 & # 52 overall) in the 2002 Entry Draft to Tampa Bay in exchange for this pick.
4. Calgary's first-round pick went to Florida as the result of a trade on June 22, 2002 that sent a first-round pick (# 10 overall) and a fourth-round pick in the 2002 Entry Draft to Calgary in exchange for this pick.
5. Florida's acquired first-round pick went to Calgary as the result of a trade on June 22, 2002 that sent a first-round pick (# 9 overall) in the 2002 Entry Draft to Florida in exchange for a fourth-round pick in the 2002 Entry Draft and this pick.
  Florida previously acquired this pick as the result of a trade on March 18, 2002 that sent Pavel Bure and a second-round pick (# 33 overall) in the 2002 Entry Draft to the Rangers in exchange for Igor Ulanov, Filip Novak a second-round pick (# 40 overall) in the 2002 Entry Draft, a fourth-round pick in the 2003 entry draft and this pick.
6. Dallas' first-round pick went to Washington as the result of a trade on June 12, 2002 that sent a first-round pick (# 26 overall) and a second-round pick in the 2002 Entry Draft along with a sixth-round pick in the 2003 entry draft to Dallas in exchange for this pick.
7. Edmonton's first-round pick went to Montreal as the result of a trade on June 22, 2002 that sent a first-round pick (# 15 overall) and an eighth-round pick in the 2002 Entry Draft to Edmonton in exchange for this pick.
8. Montreal's first-round pick went to Edmonton as the result of a trade on June 22, 2002 that sent a first-round pick (# 14 overall) in the 2002 Entry Draft to Montreal in exchange for an eighth-round pick in the 2002 Entry Draft and this pick.
9. Vancouver's first-round pick went to Washington as the result of a trade on November 10, 2001 that sent Trevor Linden and a second-round pick in the 2002 Entry Draft to Vancouver in exchange for a third-round pick in the 2003 entry draft and this pick.
10. Columbus' acquired first-round pick went to Buffalo as the result of a trade on June 22, 2002 that sent the rights to Mike Pandolfo and a first-round pick (# 30 overall) in the 2002 Entry Draft to Columbus in exchange for this pick.
  Columbus previously acquired this pick as the result of a trade on June 18, 2002 that sent Ron Tugnutt and a second-round pick in the 2002 Entry Draft to Dallas in exchange for this pick.
  Dallas previously acquired this pick as the result of a trade on March 19, 2002 that sent Joe Nieuwendyk and Jamie Langenbrunner to New Jersey in exchange for Jason Arnott, Randy McKay and this pick.
11. St. Louis' first-round pick went to Phoenix as the result of a trade on March 13, 2001 that sent Keith Tkachuk to St. Louis in exchange for Michael Handzus, Ladislav Nagy, the rights to Jeff Taffe and a first-round pick in the 2001 entry draft or 2002 Entry Draft. The first-round pick option became a first-round pick in the 2002 Entry Draft after St. Louis lost its first-round pick in the 2001 entry draft to New Jersey as a penalty for Scott Stevens tampering.
12. Washington's acquired first-round pick went to Dallas as the result of a trade on June 12, 2002 that sent a first-round pick (# 13 overall) in the 2002 Entry Draft to Washington in exchange for a second-round pick in the 2002 Entry Draft and a sixth-round pick in the 2003 entry draft along with this pick.
  Washington previously acquired this pick as the result of a trade on March 19, 2002 that sent Adam Oates to Philadelphia in exchange for Maxime Ouellet, a second-round pick and a third-round pick in the 2002 Entry Draft along with this pick.
13. Columbus' acquired first-round pick went to Atlanta as the result of a trade on June 22, 2002 that sent a second-round pick and a third-round pick in the 2002 Entry Draft to Columbus in exchange for this pick.
  Columbus previously acquired this pick as the result of a trade on June 22, 2002 that sent a first-round pick (# 20 overall) in the 2002 Entry Draft to Buffalo in exchange for the rights to Mike Pandolfo and this pick.
  Buffalo previously acquired this pick as the result of a trade on June 29, 2001 that sent Dominik Hasek to Detroit in exchange for Vyacheslav Kozlov, a conditional pick in the 2003 entry draft and this pick. The conditions of the conditional pick are unknown and the pick was not exercised.

=== Round two ===
#	Player	Nationality	NHL team	College/junior/club team
31	Jeff Drouin-Deslauriers (G)	Canada	Edmonton Oilers (from Atlanta via Buffalo)^{1}	Chicoutimi Sagueneens (QMJHL)
32	Janos Vas	Hungary	Dallas Stars (from Columbus)^{2}	Malmo IF (Sweden)
33	Lee Falardeau	United States	New York Rangers (from Florida)^{3}	Michigan State University (Big Ten)
34	Tobias Stephan (G)	Switzerland	Dallas Stars (from Tampa Bay via Ottawa, Philadelphia and Tampa Bay)^{4}	EHC Chur (Switzerland)
35	Ondrej Nemec (D)	Czech Republic	Pittsburgh Penguins	HC Vsetin (Czech Republic)
36	Jarret Stoll	Canada	Edmonton Oilers (from Nashville via Buffalo)^{5}	Kootenay Ice (WHL)
37	Tim Brent	Canada	Mighty Ducks of Anaheim	Toronto St. Michael's Majors (OHL)
38	Josh Harding (G)	Canada	Minnesota Wild	Regina Pats (WHL)
39	Brian McConnell	United States	Calgary Flames	Boston University (Hockey East)
40	Rob Globke	United States	Florida Panthers (from New York Rangers)^{6}	University of Notre Dame (Hockey East)
41	Joakim Lindstrom	Sweden	Columbus Blue Jackets (from Buffalo via Atlanta)^{7}	MODO (Sweden)
42	Marius Holtet	Norway	Dallas Stars (from Washington)^{8}	Farjestad BK (Sweden)
43	Trevor Daley (D)	Canada	Dallas Stars	Sault Ste. Marie Greyhounds (OHL)
44	Matt Greene (D)	United States	Edmonton Oilers	Green Bay Gamblers (USHL)
45	Tomas Linhart (D)	Czech Republic	Montreal Canadiens	HC Pardubice Jr. (Czech Republic)
46	David LeNeveu (G)	Canada	Phoenix Coyotes (compensatory)^{9}	Cornell University (ECAC)
47	Alexei Kaigorodov	Russia	Ottawa Senators	Metallurg Magnitogorsk (Russia)
48	Aleksei Shkotov	Russia	St. Louis Blues (compensatory)^{10}	Elemash Elektrostal (Russia)
49	Kirill Koltsov (D)	Russia	Vancouver Canucks	Avangard Omsk (Russia)
50	Sergei Anshakov	Russia	Los Angeles Kings	CSKA Moscow Jr. (Russia)
51	Anton Kadeykin (D)	Russia	New Jersey Devils (compensatory)^{11}	Elemash Elektrostal (Russia)
52	Dan Spang (D)	United States	San Jose Sharks (from Phoenix via Philadelphia and Tampa Bay)^{12}	Winchester High School (USHS–MA)
53	Barry Tallackson	United States	New Jersey Devils	University of Minnesota (Big Ten)
54	Duncan Keith (D)	Canada	Chicago Blackhawks	Michigan State University (Big Ten)
55	Denis Grot (D)	Russia	Vancouver Canucks (from New York Islanders via Tampa Bay and Washington)^{13}	Elemash Elektrostal (Russia)
56	Vladislav Evseev	Russia	Boston Bruins (from St. Louis)^{14}	CSKA Moscow Jr. (Russia)
57	Matt Stajan	Canada	Toronto Maple Leafs	Belleville Bulls (OHL)
58	Jiri Hudler	Czech Republic	Detroit Red Wings (from Carolina)^{15}	HC Vsetin (Czech Republic)
59	Maxime Daigneault (G)	Canada	Washington Capitals (from Philadelphia)^{16}	Val-d'Or Foreurs (QMJHL)
60	Adam Henrich	Canada	Tampa Bay Lightning (from San Jose)^{17}	Brampton Battalion (OHL)
61	Johnny Boychuk (D)	Canada	Colorado Avalanche	Calgary Hitmen (WHL)
62	Andriy Mikhnov	Ukraine	St. Louis Blues (from Boston)^{18}	Sudbury Wolves (OHL)
63	Tomas Fleischmann	Czech Republic	Detroit Red Wings	HC Vitkovice (Czech Republic)

1. Buffalo's acquired second-round pick went to Edmonton as the result of a trade on June 22, 2002 that sent Jochen Hecht to Buffalo in exchange for a second-round pick (# 36 overall) in the 2002 Entry Draft and this pick.
  Buffalo previously acquired this pick as the result of a trade on June 22, 2002 that sent Vyacheslav Kozlov and a second-round pick (# 41 overall) in the 2002 Entry Draft to Atlanta in exchange for a third-round pick in the 2002 Entry Draft and this pick.
2. Columbus' second-round pick went to Dallas as the result of a trade on June 18, 2002 that sent a first-round pick in the 2002 Entry Draft to Columbus in exchange for Ron Tugnutt and this pick.
3. Florida's second-round pick went to the Rangers as the result of a trade on March 18, 2002 that sent Igor Ulanov, Filip Novak a first-round pick and a second-round pick (# 40 overall) in the 2002 Entry Draft along with a fourth-round pick in the 2003 entry draft to the Rangers in exchange for Pavel Bure and this pick.
4. Tampa Bay's acquired second-round pick went to Dallas as the result of a trade on June 22, 2002 that sent Brad Lukowich and a seventh-round pick in the 2003 entry draft to Tampa Bay in exchange for this pick.
  Tampa Bay previously acquired this pick as the result of a trade on June 21, 2002 that sent a first-round pick (# 4 overall) in the 2002 Entry Draft to Philadelphia in exchange for Ruslan Fedotenko, a second-round pick (# 52 overall) in the 2002 Entry Draft and this pick.
  Philadelphia previously acquired this pick as the result of a trade on June 23, 2001 that sent a first-round pick (# 23 overall) in the 2001 entry draft to Ottawa in exchange for a first-round pick (# 27 overall) and a seventh-round compensatory pick in the 2001 entry draft along with this pick.
  Ottawa previously acquired this pick as the result of a trade on June 30, 1999 that sent Andreas Johansson and the rights to sign Rick Dudley as General Manager to Tampa Bay Lightning in exchange for Rob Zamuner and a second-round pick in the 2000 entry draft or 2001 entry draft or 2002 Entry Draft (this pick).
5. Buffalo's acquired second-round pick went to Edmonton as the result of a trade on June 22, 2002 that sent Jochen Hecht to Buffalo in exchange for a second-round pick (# 31 overall) in the 2002 Entry Draft and this pick.
  Buffalo previously acquired this pick as the result of a trade on June 22, 2002 that sent a third-round pick in the 2002 Entry Draft and a second-round pick in the 2003 entry draft to Nashville in exchange for this pick.
6. The Rangers second-round pick went to Florida as the result of a trade on March 18, 2002 that sent Pavel Bure and a second-round pick (# 33 overall) in the 2002 Entry Draft to the Rangers in exchange for Igor Ulanov, Filip Novak a first-round pick in the 2002 Entry Draft, a fourth-round pick in the 2003 entry draft and this pick.
7. Atlanta's acquired second-round pick went to Columbus as the result of a trade on June 22, 2002 that sent a first-round pick in the 2002 Entry Draft to Atlanta in exchange for a third-round pick in the 2002 Entry Draft and this pick.
  Atlanta previously acquired this pick as the result of a trade on June 22, 2002 that sent a second-round pick (# 31 overall) and a third-round pick in the 2002 Entry Draft to Buffalo in exchange for Vyacheslav Kozlov and this pick.
8. Washington's second-round pick went to Dallas as the result of a trade on June 12, 2002 that sent a first-round pick (# 13 overall) in the 2002 Entry Draft to Washington in exchange for a first-round pick (# 26 overall) in the 2002 Entry Draft and a sixth-round pick in the 2003 entry draft along with this pick.
9. Phoenix acquired this pick as the result of a compensation for Philadelphia signing Jeremy Roenick as a Group III free agent on July 2, 2001.
10. St. Louis acquired this pick as the result of a compensation for Dallas signing Pierre Turgeon as a Group III free agent on July 1, 2001.
11. New Jersey acquired this pick as the result of a compensation for Toronto signing Alexander Mogilny as a Group III free agent on July 3, 2001.
12. Tampa Bay's acquired second-round pick went to San Jose as the result of a trade on June 22, 2002 that sent a second-round pick (# 60 overall) and a fifth-round pick in the 2002 Entry Draft to Tampa Bay in exchange for this pick.
  Tampa Bay previously acquired this pick as the result of a trade on June 21, 2002 that sent a first-round pick in the 2002 Entry Draft to Philadelphia in exchange for Ruslan Fedotenko, a second-round pick (# 34 overall) in the 2002 Entry Draft and this pick.
  Philadelphia previously acquired this pick as the result of a trade on July 2, 2001 that sent Daymond Langkow to Phoenix in exchange for a first-round pick in the 2003 entry draft and this pick.
13. Washington's acquired second-round pick went to Vancouver as the result of a trade on November 10, 2001 that sent a first-round pick in the 2002 Entry Draft and a third-round pick in the 2003 entry draft to Washington in exchange for Trevor Linden and this pick.
  Washington previously acquired this pick as the result of a trade on June 23, 2001 that sent a second-round pick in the 2003 entry draft to Tampa Bay in exchange for this pick.
  Tampa Bay previously acquired this pick as the result of a trade on June 22, 2001 that sent Adrian Aucoin and Alexander Kharitonov to the Islanders in exchange for Mathieu Biron and this pick.
14. St. Louis' second-round pick went to Boston as the result of a trade on June 22, 2002 that sent a second-round pick (# 62 overall) and a fifth-round pick in the 2002 Entry Draft to St. Louis in exchange for this pick.
15. Carolina's second-round pick went to Detroit as the result of a trade on July 9, 2001 that sent Aaron Ward to Carolina in exchange for this pick.
16. Washington second-round pick went to Philadelphia as the result of a trade on March 19, 2002 that sent Adam Oates to Philadelphia in exchange for Maxime Ouellet, a first-round pick and a third-round pick in the 2002 Entry Draft along with this pick.
17. San Jose's second-round pick went to Tampa Bay as the result of a trade on June 22, 2002 that sent a second-round pick (# 52 overall) in the 2002 Entry Draft to San Jose in exchange for a fifth-round pick in the 2002 Entry Draft and this pick.
18. Boston's second-round pick went to St. Louis as the result of a trade on June 22, 2002 that sent a second-round pick (# 56 overall) in the 2002 Entry Draft to Boston in exchange for a fifth-round pick in the 2002 Entry Draft and this pick.

=== Round three ===
#	Player	Nationality	NHL team	College/junior/club team
64	Jason Ryznar	United States	New Jersey Devils (from Atlanta)^{1}	University of Michigan (Big Ten)
65	Ole-Kristian Tollefsen (D)	Norway	Columbus Blue Jackets	Lillehammer IK (Norway)
66	Petr Kanko	Czech Republic	Los Angeles Kings (compensatory)^{2}	Kitchener Rangers (OHL)
67	Gregory Campbell	Canada	Florida Panthers (from Florida via New York Islanders)^{3}	Plymouth Whalers (OHL)
68	Brett Skinner (D)	Canada	Vancouver Canucks (from Tampa Bay via Philadelphia)^{4}	Des Moines Buccaneers (USHL)
69	Erik Christensen	Canada	Pittsburgh Penguins	Kamloops Blazers (WHL)
70	Joe Callahan (D)	United States	Phoenix Coyotes (from Nashville via Philadelphia)^{5}	Yale University (ECAC)
71	Brian Lee (D)	United States	Mighty Ducks of Anaheim	Erie Otters (OHL)
72	Mike Erickson	United States	Minnesota Wild	University of Minnesota (Big Ten)
73	Barry Brust (G)	Canada	Minnesota Wild (compensatory)^{6}	Spokane Chiefs (WHL)
74	Todd Ford (G)	Canada	Toronto Maple Leafs (from Calgary)^{7}	Swift Current Broncos (WHL)
75	Arttu Luttinen	Finland	Ottawa Senators (from New York Rangers)^{8}	HIFK Jr. (Finland)
76	Michael Tessier	Canada	Buffalo Sabres	Acadie-Bathurst Titan (QMJHL)
77	Patrick Wellar (D)	Canada	Washington Capitals	Portland Winterhawks (WHL)
78	Geoff Waugh (D)	Canada	Dallas Stars	Kindersley Klippers (SJHL)
79	Brock Radunske	Canada	Edmonton Oilers	Michigan State University (Big Ten)
80	Matt Jones (D)	United States	Phoenix Coyotes (from Montreal)^{9}	University of North Dakota (NCHC)
81	Marcus Jonasen	Sweden	New York Rangers (from Ottawa)^{10}	VIK Vasteras HK Jr. (Sweden)
82	John Adams (D)	United States	Buffalo Sabres (from Vancouver via Florida and Atlanta)^{11}	Boston College (Hockey East)
83	Lukas Mensator (G)	Czech Republic	Vancouver Canucks (from Los Angeles)^{12}	Energie Karlovy Vary Jr. (Czech Republic)
84	Marek Chvatal (D)	Czech Republic	New Jersey Devils (from Phoenix)^{13}	HC Ocelari Trinec Jr. (Czech Republic)
85	Ahren Spylo	Canada	New Jersey Devils	Windsor Spitfires (OHL)
86	Jonas Fiedler	Czech Republic	San Jose Sharks (from Chicago)^{14}	Plymouth Whalers (OHL)
87	Frans Nielsen	Denmark	New York Islanders	Malmo IF (Sweden)
88	Dominic D'Amour (D)	Canada	Toronto Maple Leafs (from Buffalo; compensatory via Nashville)^{15}	Hull Olympiques (QMJHL)
89	Tomas Troliga	Slovakia	St. Louis Blues	HK Spisska Nova Ves (Slovakia)
90	Matthew Lombardi	Canada	Calgary Flames (from Toronto)^{16}	Victoriaville Tigres (QMJHL)
91	Jesse Lane (D)	United States	Carolina Hurricanes (from Carolina via Philadelphia)^{17}	Hull Olympiques (QMJHL)
92	Derek Krestanovich	Canada	Washington Capitals (from Philadelphia)^{18}	Moose Jaw Warriors (WHL)
93	Alexander Kozhevnikov	Russia	Chicago Blackhawks (from San Jose)^{19}	Krylya Sovetov Jr. (Russia)
94	Eric Lundberg (D)	United States	Colorado Avalanche	Providence College (Hockey East)
95	Valtteri Filppula	Finland	Detroit Red Wings (from Boston via Anaheim and Nashville)^{20}	Jokerit (Finland)
96	Jeff Genovy	United States	Columbus Blue Jackets (from Detroit via Atlanta)^{21}	Des Moines Buccaneers (USHL)

1. Atlanta's third-round pick went to New Jersey as the result of a trade on June 24, 2001 that sent a fourth-round pick in the 2001 entry draft and a seventh-round pick in the 2002 Entry Draft to Atlanta in exchange for this pick.
2. Los Angeles acquired this pick as the result of a compensation for Detroit signing Luc Robitaille as a Group III free agent on July 5, 2001.
3. Florida's third-round pick was re-acquired as the result of a trade on June 22, 2002 that sent Eric Godard to the Islanders in exchange for this pick.
  The Islanders previously acquired this pick as the result of a trade on June 23, 2001 that sent a third-round pick in the 2001 Entry Draft to Florida in exchange for a fourth-round pick in the 2001 entry draft and this pick.
4. Philadelphia's acquired third-round pick went to Vancouver as the result of a trade on December 17, 2001 that sent Donald Brashear and a sixth-round pick in the 2002 Entry Draft to Philadelphia in exchange for Jan Hlavac and this pick.
  Philadelphia previously acquired this pick as the result of a trade on June 24, 2001 that sent a fourth-round pick, a fifth-round pick and a seventh-round pick in the 2001 entry draft to Tampa Bay in exchange for this pick.
5. Philadelphia's acquired third-round pick went to Phoenix as the result of a trade on June 12, 2002 that sent Robert Esche and Michal Handzus to Philadelphia in exchange for Brian Boucher and this pick.
  Philadelphia previously acquired this pick as the result of a trade on July 31, 2001 that sent Andy Delmore to Nashville in exchange for this pick.
6. Minnesota acquired this pick as the result of a compensation for Boston signing Sean O'Donnell as a Group V free agent on July 2, 2001.
7. Calgary's third-round pick went to Toronto as the result of a trade on June 22, 2002 that sent a third-round pick (# 90 overall) and a fifth-round pick in the 2002 Entry Draft to Calgary in exchange for this pick.
8. The Rangers' third-round pick went to Ottawa as the result of a trade on June 22, 2002 that sent a third-round pick (# 81 overall and a fourth-round pick in the 2002 Entry Draft to the Rangers in exchange for this pick.
9. Montreal's third-round pick went to Phoenix as the result of a trade on January 24, 2002 that sent Sergei Berezin to Montreal in exchange for Brian Savage, future considerations and a third-round pick in either 2002 Entry Draft (this pick) or 2003 entry draft.
10. Ottawa's third-round pick went to the Rangers as the result of a trade on June 22, 2002 that sent a third-round pick (# 75 overall) in the 2002 Entry Draft to Ottawa in exchange for a fourth-round pick in the 2002 Entry Draft and this pick.
11. Atlanta's acquired third-round pick went to Buffalo as the result of a trade on June 22, 2002 that sent Vyacheslav Kozlov and a second-round pick (# 41 overall) in the 2002 Entry Draft to Atlanta in exchange for a second-round pick (# 31 overall) in the 2002 Entry Draft and this pick.
  Atlanta previously acquired this pick as the result of a trade on June 22, 2002 that sent future considerations (Atlanta's promise not to draft Jay Bouwmeester # 2 overall in 2002 NHL draft) to Florida in exchange for a fourth-round pick in the 2003 entry draft and this pick.
  Florida previously acquired this pick as the result of a trade on May 31, 2001 that sent Alex Auld to Vancouver in exchange for a second-round pick in the 2001 entry draft and this pick.
12. Los Angeles' third-round pick went to Vancouver as the result of a trade on February 15, 2001 that sent Felix Potvin to Los Angeles in exchange for this pick.# Phoenix's third-round pick went to New Jersey as the result of a trade on June 23, 2001 that sent a third-round pick in the 2001 entry draft to Phoenix in exchange for a fourth-round pick in the 2001 entry draft and this pick.
13. Phoenix's third-round pick went to New Jersey as the result of a trade on June 23, 2001 that sent a third-round pick in the 2001 entry draft to Phoenix in exchange for a fourth-round pick in the 2001 entry draft and this pick.
14. Chicago's third-round pick went to San Jose as the result of a trade on June 22, 2002 that sent a third-round pick (# 93 overall) and a fourth-round pick in the 2002 Entry Draft to Chicago in exchange for this pick.
15. Nashville's acquired third-round pick went to Toronto as the result of a trade on June 22, 2002 that sent a third-round pick in the 2003 entry draft to Nashville in exchange for this pick.
  Nashville previously acquired this pick as the result of a trade on June 22, 2002 that sent a second-round pick in the 2002 Entry Draft to Buffalo in exchange for a second-round pick in the 2003 entry draft and this pick.
  Buffalo acquired this pick as the result of a compensation for Dallas signing Donald Audette as a Group III free agent on July 2, 2001.
16. Toronto's third-round pick went to Calgary as the result of a trade on June 22, 2002 that sent a third-round pick (# 74 overall) in the 2002 Entry Draft to Toronto in exchange for a fifth-round pick in the 2002 Entry Draft and this pick.
17. Carolina's third-round pick was re-acquired as the result of a trade on June 22, 2002 that sent a sixth-round pick in the 2002 Entry Draft and a third-round pick in the 2003 entry draft to Philadelphia in exchange for this pick.
  Philadelphia previously acquired this pick as the result of a trade on June 24, 2001 that sent a fourth-round pick in the 2001 Entry Draft to Carolina in exchange for this pick.
18. Washington third-round pick went to Philadelphia as the result of a trade on March 19, 2002 that sent Adam Oates to Philadelphia in exchange for Maxime Ouellet, a first-round pick and a second-round pick in the 2002 Entry Draft along with this pick.
19. San Jose's third-round pick went to Chicago as the result of a trade on June 22, 2002 that sent a third-round pick (# 86 overall) in the 2002 Entry Draft to San Jose in exchange for a fourth-round pick in the 2002 Entry Draft and this pick.
20. Nashville's acquired third-round pick went to Detroit as the result of a trade on June 22, 2002 that sent a third-round pick in the 2003 entry draft to Nashville in exchange for this pick.
  Nashville previously acquired this pick as the result of a trade on June 22, 2002 that sent future considerations (Nashville agreed not to select Joffrey Lupul # 6 overall in 2002 Entry Draft) to Anaheim in exchange for this pick.
  Anaheim previously acquired this pick as the result of a trade on March 5, 2002 that sent Marty McInnis to Boston in exchange for this pick.
21. Atlanta's acquired third-round pick went to Columbus as the result of a trade on June 22, 2002 that sent a first-round pick in the 2002 Entry Draft to Atlanta in exchange for a second-round pick in the 2002 Entry Draft and this pick.
  Atlanta previously acquired this pick as the result of a trade on March 19, 2002 that sent Jiri Slegr to Detroit in exchange for Yuri Butsayev and this pick.

=== Round four ===
#	Player	Nationality	NHL team	College/junior/club team
97	Lance Monych	Canada	Phoenix Coyotes (from Atlanta)^{1}	Brandon Wheat Kings (WHL)
98	Ivan Tkachenko	Russia	Columbus Blue Jackets	Lokomotiv Yaroslavl (Russia)
99	Michael Lambert	Canada	Montreal Canadiens (from Florida via Calgary)^{2}	Montreal Rocket (QMJHL)
100	Dmitri Kazionov	Russia	Tampa Bay Lightning	CSKA Moscow Jr. (Russia)
101	Daniel Fernholm (D)	Sweden	Pittsburgh Penguins	Djurgardens IF Jr. (Sweden)
102	Brandon Segal	Canada	Nashville Predators	Calgary Hitmen (WHL)
103	Joonas Vihko	Finland	Mighty Ducks of Anaheim	HIFK Jr. (Finland)
104	Aaron Rome (D)	Canada	Los Angeles Kings (from Minnesota via Dallas and Minnesota)^{3}	Swift Current Broncos (WHL)
105	Rosario Ruggeri (D)	Canada	Philadelphia Flyers (from Calgary)^{4}	Chicoutimi Sagueneens (QMJHL)
106	Ivan Koltsov (D)	Russia	Edmonton Oilers (from New York Rangers)^{5}	Severstal Cherepovets Jr. (Russia)
107	Mikko Kalteva (D)	Finland	Colorado Avalanche (compensatory)^{6}	Jokerit Jr. (Finland)
108	Jakub Hulva	Czech Republic	Buffalo Sabres	HC Vitkovice Jr. (Czech Republic)
109	Jevon Desautels	Canada	Washington Capitals	Spokane Chiefs (WHL)
110	Jarkko Immonen	Finland	Dallas Stars	Blues Jr. (Finland)
111	Jonas Almtorp	Sweden	Edmonton Oilers	MODO Jr. (Sweden)
112	Yuri Artyomenkov	Russia	Calgary Flames (from Montreal)^{7}	Krylya Sovetov Jr. (Russia)
113	Scott Dobben	Canada	Ottawa Senators	Erie Otters (OHL)
114	John Laliberte	United States	Vancouver Canucks	New Hampshire Jr. Monarchs (EJHL)
115	Mark Rooneem	Canada	Los Angeles Kings	Kamloops Blazers (WHL)
116	Pat Dwyer	United States	Atlanta Thrashers (from Phoenix)^{8}	Western Michigan University (NCHC)
117	Cam Janssen	United States	New Jersey Devils	Windsor Spitfires (OHL)
118	Petr Dvorak	Czech Republic	Washington Capitals (from Chicago)^{9}	Havirov Femax HC (Czech Republic)
119	Jekabs Redlihs (D)	Latvia	Columbus Blue Jackets (from New York Islanders)^{10}	New York Apple Core (EHL)
120	Robin Jonsson	Sweden	St. Louis Blues	Bofors IK (Sweden)
121	Marty Magers (G)	United States	Buffalo Sabres (compensatory)^{11}	Omaha Lancers (USHL)
122	David Turon (D)	Czech Republic	Toronto Maple Leafs	Havirov Femax (Czech Republic)
123	~~Robin Kovar~~	~~Czech Republic~~	~~Edmonton Oilers (compensatory)~~^{12}	~~Vancouver Giants (WHL)~~
124	Lane Manson (D)	Canada	Atlanta Thrashers (from Carolina via St. Louis)^{13}	Moose Jaw Warriors (WHL)
125	Johan Bjork (D)	Sweden	Ottawa Senators (compensatory)^{14}	Malmo IF Jr. (Sweden)
126	Konstantin Baranov	Russia	Philadelphia Flyers	Chelmet Chelyabinsk (Russia)
127	Nate Guenin (D)	United States	New York Rangers (from Ottawa; compensatory)^{15}	Green Bay Gamblers (USHL)
128	Matt Ellison	Canada	Chicago Blackhawks (from San Jose)^{16}	Cowichan Valley Capitals (BCHL)
129	Tom Gilbert (D)	United States	Colorado Avalanche	Chicago Steel (USHL)
130	Jan Kubista	Czech Republic	Boston Bruins	HC Pardubice Jr. (Czech Republic)
131	Johan Berggren (D)	Sweden	Detroit Red Wings	Sunne (Sweden)

1. Atlanta's fourth-round pick went to Phoenix as the result of a trade on March 19, 2002 that sent Kirill Safronov, the rights to Ruslan Zainullin and a fourth-round pick (# 166 overall) in the 2002 Entry Draft to Atlanta in exchange for Darcy Hordichuk a fifth-round pick in the 2002 Entry Draft and this pick.
2. Calgary's acquired fourth-round pick went to Montreal as the result of a trade on June 23, 2002 that sent a fourth-round (# 112 overall) and a fifth-round pick in the 2002 Entry Draft to Calgary in exchange for this pick.
  Calgary previously acquired this pick as the result of a trade on June 22, 2002 that sent a first-round pick (# 9 overall) in the 2002 Entry Draft to Florida in exchange for a first-round pick (# 10 overall) in the 2002 Entry Draft and this pick.
3. Minnesota's re-acquired fourth-round pick went to Los Angeles as the result of a trade on June 22, 2002 that sent Cliff Ronning to Minnesota in exchange for this pick.
  Dallas fourth-round pick was re-acquired as the result of a trade on June 25, 2000 that sent Brad Lukowich, a third-round and ninth-round picks in the 2001 entry draft to Minnesota in exchange for Aaron Gavey, Pavel Patera, an eighth-round pick in the 2000 entry draft and this pick.
  Minnesota previously acquired this pick as the result of a trade on June 12, 2000 that sent Manny Fernandez and Brad Lukowich to Minnesota in exchange for a third-round pick in the 2000 entry draft and this pick.
4. Calgary's fourth-round pick went to Philadelphia as the result of a trade on June 24, 2001 that sent Dean McAmmond to Calgary in exchange for this pick.
5. The Rangers' fourth-round pick went to Edmonton as the result of a trade on March 19, 2002 that sent Tom Poti and Rem Murray to the Rangers in exchange for Mike York and this pick.
6. Colorado acquired this pick as the result of a compensation for Chicago signing Jon Klemm as a Group III free agent on July 1, 2001.
7. Montreal's fourth-round pick went to Calgary as the result of a trade on June 23, 2002 that sent a fourth-round pick (# 99 overall) in the 2002 Entry Draft to Montreal in exchange for a fifth-round pick in the 2002 Entry Draft and this pick.
8. Phoenix's fourth-round pick went to Atlanta as the result of a trade on March 19, 2002 that sent Darcy Hordichuk a fourth-round pick (# 97 overall) and a fifth-round pick in the 2002 Entry Draft to Phoenix in exchange for Kirill Safronov, the rights to Ruslan Zainullin and this pick.
9. Chicago's fourth-round pick went to Washington as the result of a trade on January 16, 2002 that sent Joe Reekie to Chicago in exchange for this pick.
10. The Islanders' fourth-round pick went to Columbus as the result of a trade on June 22, 2002 that sent Mattias Timander to the Islanders in exchange for this pick.
11. Buffalo acquired this pick as the result of a compensation for Los Angeles signing Steve Heinze as a Group III free agent on July 4, 2001.
12. Edmonton originally acquired this pick as the result of a compensation for The Rangers signing Igor Ulanov as a Group III free agent on July 20, 2001. The pick was voided because the selected player was ineligible.
13. St. Louis' acquired fourth-round pick went to Atlanta as the result of a trade on March 18, 2002 that sent Ray Ferraro to St. Louis in exchange for this pick.
  St. Louis previously acquired this pick as the result of a trade on December 5, 2001 that sent Sean Hill to Carolina in exchange for Steve Halko and this pick.
14. Ottawa acquired this pick as the result of a compensation for Anaheim signing Jason York as a Group III free agent on July 3, 2001.
15. Ottawa's acquired fourth-round pick went to the Rangers as the result of a trade on June 22, 2002 that sent a third-round pick (# 75 overall) in the 2002 Entry Draft to Ottawa in exchange for a third-round pick (# 81 overall) in the 2002 Entry Draft and this pick.
  Ottawa acquired this pick as the result of a compensation for Boston signing Rob Zamuner as a Group III free agent on July 6, 2001.
16. San Jose's fourth-round pick went to Chicago as the result of a trade on June 22, 2002 that sent a third-round pick (# 86 overall) in the 2002 Entry Draft to San Jose in exchange for a third-round pick (# 93 overall) in the 2002 Entry Draft and this pick.

=== Round five ===
#	Player	Nationality	NHL team	College/junior/club team
132	John Zeiler	United States	Phoenix Coyotes (from Atlanta)^{1}	Sioux City Musketeers (USHL)
133	Lasse Pirjeta	Finland	Columbus Blue Jackets	Karpat (Finland)
134	Topi Jaakola (D)	Finland	Florida Panthers	Karpat (Finland)
135	Joseph Pearce (G)	United States	Tampa Bay Lightning	New Hampshire Jr. Monarchs (EJHL)
136	Andy Sertich (D)	United States	Pittsburgh Penguins (compensatory)^{2}	Greenway High School (USHS–MN)
137	Cam Paddock	Canada	Pittsburgh Penguins	Kelowna Rockets (WHL)
138	Patrick Jarrett	Canada	Nashville Predators	Owen Sound Attack (OHL)
139	Kris Newbury	Canada	San Jose Sharks (compensatory)^{3}	Sarnia Sting (OHL)
140	George Davis	Canada	Mighty Ducks of Anaheim	Cape Breton Screaming Eagles (QMJHL)
141	Jiri Cetkovsky	Czech Republic	Calgary Flames (from Minnesota via Montreal)^{4}	HC Zlin Jr. (Czech Republic)
142	Emanuel Peter	Switzerland	Calgary Flames	Kloten Flyers (Switzerland)
143	Mike Walsh	United States	New York Rangers	Detroit Compuware Ambassadors (MWJHL)
144	Paul Flache (D)	Canada	Atlanta Thrashers (from Buffalo)^{5}	Brampton Battalion (OHL)
145	Robert Gherson (G)	Canada	Washington Capitals	Sarnia Sting (OHL)
146	Viktor Bobrov	Russia	Calgary Flames (compensatory)^{6}	CSKA Moscow Jr. (Russia)
147	David Bararuk	Canada	Dallas Stars	Moose Jaw Warriors (WHL)
148	Glenn Fisher (G)	Canada	Edmonton Oilers	Fort Saskatchewan Traders (AJHL)
149	Marcus Paulsson	Sweden	New York Islanders (from Montreal)^{7}	Morrums GoIS IK (Sweden)
150	Brock Hooton	Canada	Ottawa Senators	Quesnel Millionaires (BCHL)
151	Rob McVicar (G)	Canada	Vancouver Canucks	Brandon Wheat Kings (WHL)
152	Gregory Hogeboom	Canada	Los Angeles Kings	Miami University (NCHC)
153	Peter Hamerlik (G)	Slovakia	Boston Bruins (from Phoenix)^{8}	Kingston Frontenacs (OHL)
154	Krisjanis Redlihs (D)	Latvia	New Jersey Devils	HK Liepājas Metalurgs (Latvia)
155	Armands Berzins	Latvia	Minnesota Wild (from Carolina)^{9}	Shawinigan Cataractes (QMJHL)
156	James Wisniewski (D)	United States	Chicago Blackhawks	Plymouth Whalers (OHL)
157	Joel Andresen (D)	Canada	Los Angeles Kings (from New York Islanders)^{10}	St. Albert Steel (AJHL)
158	Vince Bellissimo	Canada	Florida Panthers (from St. Louis)^{11}	Topeka ScareCrows (USHL)
159	Kristofer Persson	Sweden	Calgary Flames (from Toronto)^{12}	MODO Jr. (Sweden)
160	Daniel Manzato (G)	Switzerland	Carolina Hurricanes	Victoriaville Tigres (QMJHL)
161	Dov Grumet-Morris (G)	United States	Philadelphia Flyers	Harvard University (ECAC)
162	Gerard Dicaire (D)	Canada	Tampa Bay Lightning (from San Jose; compensatory)^{13}	Kootenay Ice (WHL)
163	Tom Walsh (D)	United States	San Jose Sharks	Deerfield Academy (USHS-MA)
164	Tyler Weiman (G)	Canada	Colorado Avalanche	Tri-City Americans (WHL)
165	Justin Maiser	United States	St. Louis Blues (from Boston)^{14}	Boston University (Hockey East)
166	Logan Koopmans (G)	Canada	Detroit Red Wings	Lethbridge Hurricanes (WHL)

1. Atlanta's fifth-round pick went to Phoenix as the result of a trade on March 19, 2002 that sent Kirill Safronov, the rights to Ruslan Zainullin and a fourth-round pick (# 166 overall) in the 2002 Entry Draft to Atlanta in exchange for Darcy Hordichuk a fourth-round pick (# 97 overall) in the 2002 Entry Draft and this pick.
2. Pittsburgh acquired this pick as the result of a compensation for the Islanders signing Garth Snow as a Group III free agent on July 1, 2001.
3. San Jose acquired this pick as the result of a compensation for St. Louis signing Rich Pilon as a Group III free agent on July 10, 2001.
4. Montreal's acquired fifth-round pick went to Calgary as the result of a trade on June 23, 2002 that sent a fourth-round pick (# 99 overall) in the 2002 Entry Draft to Montreal in exchange for a fourth-round pick (# 112 overall) in the 2002 Entry Draft this pick.
  Montreal previously acquired this pick as the result of a trade on May 24, 2002 that sent Chris Dyment to Minnesota in exchange for this pick.
5. Buffalo's fifth-round pick went to Atlanta as the result of a trade on March 19, 2002 that sent Bob Corkum to Buffalo in exchange for this pick.
6. Calgary acquired this pick as the result of a compensation for New Jersey signing Tommy Albelin as a Group III free agent on July 9, 2001.
7. Montreal's fifth-round pick went to the Islanders as the result of a trade on June 22, 2002 that sent Mariusz Czerkawski to Montreal in exchange for Arron Asham and this pick.
8. Phoenix's fifth-round pick went to Boston as the result of a trade on January 24, 2002 that sent Andrei Nazarov to Phoenix in exchange for this pick.
9. Carolina's fifth-round pick went to Minnesota as the result of a trade on March 1, 2001 that sent Scott Pellerin to Carolina in exchange for Askhat Rakhmatullin, a third-round pick in the 2001 entry draft and a conditional pick in the 2002 Entry Draft (this pick). Conditions of this draft pick are unknown.
10. The Islanders' fifth-round pick went to Los Angeles as the result of a trade on January 3, 2001 that sent Jason Blake to the Islanders in exchange for this pick.
11. St. Louis' fifth-round pick went to Florida as the result of a trade on February 9, 2001 that sent Scott Mellanby to St. Louis in exchange for David Morisset and this pick.
12. Toronto's fifth-round pick went to Calgary as the result of a trade on June 22, 2002 that sent a third-round pick (# 74 overall) in the 2002 Entry Draft to Toronto in exchange for a third-round pick (# 90 overall) in the 2002 Entry Draft and this pick.
13. San Jose's acquired fifth-round pick went to Tampa Bay as the result of a trade on June 22, 2002 that sent a second-round pick (# 52 overall) in the 2002 Entry Draft to San Jose in exchange for a second-round pick (# 60 overall) in the 2002 Entry Draft and this pick.
  San Jose acquired this pick as the result of a compensation for Florida signing Jeff Norton as a Group III free agent on July 18, 2001.
14. Boston's fifth-round pick went to St. Louis as the result of a trade on June 22, 2002 that sent a second-round pick (# 56 overall) in the 2002 Entry Draft to Boston in exchange for a second-round pick (# 62 overall) in the 2002 Entry Draft and this pick.

=== Round six ===
#	Player	Nationality	NHL team	College/junior/club team
167	Brad Schell	Canada	Atlanta Thrashers	Spokane Chiefs (WHL)
168	Tim Konsorada	Canada	Columbus Blue Jackets	Brandon Wheat Kings (WHL)
169	Jeremy Swanson (D)	Canada	Florida Panthers	Barrie Colts (OHL)
170	P. J. Atherton (D)	United States	Tampa Bay Lightning	Cedar Rapids RoughRiders (USHL)
171	Bobby Goepfert (G)	United States	Pittsburgh Penguins	Cedar Rapids RoughRiders (USHL)
172	Mike McKenna (G)	United States	Nashville Predators	St. Lawrence University (ECAC)
173	Luke Fritshaw (D)	Canada	Mighty Ducks of Anaheim	Prince Albert Raiders (WHL)
174	Karri Akkanen	Finland	Tampa Bay Lightning (from Carolina; compensatory)^{1}	Ilves Jrs. (Finland)
175	Matt Foy	Canada	Minnesota Wild	Merrimack College (Hockey East)
176	Curtis McElhinney (G)	Canada	Calgary Flames	Colorado College (NCHC)
177	Jake Taylor (D)	United States	New York Rangers	Green Bay Gamblers (USHL)
178	Maxim Shchevyev	Russia	Buffalo Sabres	Elemash Elektrostal (Russia)
179	Marian Havel	Czech Republic	Washington Capitals	Vancouver Giants (WHL)
180	Kirill Sidorenko	Russia	Dallas Stars	Zauralie Kurgan (Russia)
181	Mikko Luoma (D)	Finland	Edmonton Oilers	Tappara (Finland)
182	Andre Deveaux	Canada	Montreal Canadiens	Belleville Bulls (OHL)
183	Paul Ranger (D)	Canada	Tampa Bay Lightning (from Ottawa)^{2}	Oshawa Generals (OHL)
184	Jaroslav Balastik	Czech Republic	Columbus Blue Jackets (from Vancouver via Philadelphia)^{3}	HC Zlin (Czech Republic)
185	Ryan Murphy	United States	Los Angeles Kings	Boston College (Hockey East)
186	Jeff Pietrasiak (G)	United States	Phoenix Coyotes	Berkshire High School (USHS–MA)
187	Eric Johansson	Canada	New Jersey Devils	Tri-City Americans (WHL)
188	Kevin Kantee (D)	Finland	Chicago Blackhawks	Jokerit Jr. (Finland)
189	Alexei Stonkus	Russia	New York Islanders	Yaroslavl Jrs. (Russia)
190	D. J. King	Canada	St. Louis Blues	Lethbridge Hurricanes (WHL)
191	Ian White (D)	Canada	Toronto Maple Leafs	Swift Current Broncos (WHL)
192	Nikita Korovkin (D)	Russia	Philadelphia Flyers (from Carolina)^{4}	Kamloops Blazers (WHL)
193	Joey Mormina (D)	Canada	Philadelphia Flyers	Colgate University (ECAC)
194	Kim Hirschovits	Finland	New York Rangers (from San Jose)^{5}	HIFK (Finland)
195	Taylor Christie (D)	Canada	Colorado Avalanche	Bowling Green State University (WCHA)
196	Mikael Vuorio (G)	Finland	Florida Panthers (from Boston)^{6}	Lukko (Finland)
197	Jimmy Cuddihy	Canada	Detroit Red Wings	Shawinigan Cataractes (QMJHL)

1. Carolina's acquired sixth-round pick went to Tampa Bay as the result of a trade on June 23, 2002 that sent a fourth-round pick in the 2003 entry draft to Carolina in exchange for two eight-round picks (# 255 & 256 overall) and a ninth-round pick in the 2002 Entry Draft along with this pick.
  Carolina acquired this pick as the result of a compensation for Dallas signing Rob DiMaio as a Group III free agent on July 1, 2001.
2. Ottawa's sixth-round pick went to Tampa Bay as the result of a trade on March 15, 2002 that sent Juha Ylonen to Ottawa in exchange for Andre Roy and this pick.
3. Philadelphia's acquired sixth-round pick went to Columbus as the result of a trade on June 23, 2002 that sent a fifth-round pick in the 2003 entry draft to Philadelphia in exchange for a seventh-round pick in the 2002 Entry Draft and this pick.
  Philadelphia previously acquired this pick as the result of a trade on December 17, 2001 that sent Jan Hlavac and a third-round pick in the 2002 Entry Draft to Vancouver in exchange for Donald Brashear and this pick.
4. Carolina's sixth-round pick went to Philadelphia as the result of a trade on June 22, 2002 that sent a third-round pick in the 2002 Entry Draft to Carolina in exchange for a third-round pick in the 2003 entry draft and this pick.
5. San Jose's sixth-round pick went to the Rangers as the result of a trade on June 22, 2002 that sent a conditional sixth-round pick in the 2003 entry draft and future considerations (rights to Theo Fleury) to San Jose in exchange for this pick. The trade completed on June 26, 2002.
6. Boston's sixth-round pick went to Florida as the result of a trade on March 19, 2002 that sent Jeff Norton to Boston in exchange for this pick.

=== Round seven ===
#	Player	Nationality	NHL team	College/junior/club team
198	Nathan Oystrick	Canada	Atlanta Thrashers	Northern Michigan University (WCHA)
199	Greg Mauldin	United States	Columbus Blue Jackets	University of Massachusetts Amherst (Hockey East)
200	Denis Yachmenev	Russia	Florida Panthers	North Bay Centennials (OHL)
201	Mathieu Brunelle	Canada	Philadelphia Flyers (from Tampa Bay)^{1}	Victoriaville Tigres (QMJHL)
202	Patrik Bartschi (RW)	Switzerland	Pittsburgh Penguins	Kloten Flyers (NLA)
203	Josh Morrow (D)	Canada	Nashville Predators	Tri-City Americans (WHL)
204	Niklas Eckerblom (RW)	Sweden	Minnesota Wild (from Anaheim)^{2}	Djurgardens IF (Sweden)
205	Jean-Francois Dufort	Canada	Edmonton Oilers (from Minnesota)^{3}	Shawinigan Cataractes (QMJHL)
206	David Van der Gulik	Canada	Calgary Flames	Chilliwack Chiefs (BCHL)
207	Pierre Johnsson	Sweden	Calgary Flames (from New York Rangers)^{4}	Farjestad BK Jrs. (Sweden)
208	Radoslav Hecl (D)	Slovakia	Buffalo Sabres	Slovan Bratislava (Slovakia)
209	Joni Lindlof	Finland	Washington Capitals	Tappara Jr. (Finland)
210	Bryan Hamm (D)	Canada	Dallas Stars	Peterborough Petes (OHL)
211	Patrick Murphy	Canada	Edmonton Oilers	Newmarket Hurricanes (OPJHL)
212	Jonathan Ferland	Canada	Montreal Canadiens	Acadie-Bathurst Titan (QMJHL)
213	Fredrik Norrena (G)	Finland	Tampa Bay Lightning (from Ottawa)^{5}	TPS (Finland)
214	Marc-Andre Roy	Canada	Vancouver Canucks	Baie-Comeau Drakkar (QMJHL)
215	Mikhail Lyubushin (D)	Russia	Los Angeles Kings	Krylya Sovetov (Russia)
216	Ladislav Kouba	Czech Republic	Phoenix Coyotes	Red Deer Rebels (WHL)
217	Tim Conboy	United States	San Jose Sharks (from New Jersey via Atlanta)^{6}	Topeka Scarecrows (USHL)
218	Ilkka Pikkarainen	Finland	New Jersey Devils (compensatory)^{7}	HIFK (Finland)
219	Tyson Kellerman (G)	Canada	Chicago Blackhawks	North Bay Centennials (OHL)
220	Brad Topping (G)	Canada	New York Islanders	Brampton Battalion (OHL)
221	Jonas Johnson	Sweden	St. Louis Blues	Vastra Frolunda HC (Sweden)
222	Scott May	Canada	Toronto Maple Leafs	Ohio State University (Big Ten)
223	Ilya Krikunov	Russia	Vancouver Canucks (compensatory)^{8}	Elemash Elektrostal (Russia)
224	Adam Taylor	Canada	Carolina Hurricanes	Kootenay Ice (WHL)
225	Steven Goertzen	Canada	Columbus Blue Jackets (from Philadelphia)^{9}	Seattle Thunderbirds (WHL)
226	Joey Crabb	United States	New York Rangers (from San Jose)^{10}	Green Bay Gamblers (USHL)
227	Ryan Steeves	Canada	Colorado Avalanche	Yale University (ECAC)
228	Dmitri Utkin	Russia	Boston Bruins	Lokomotiv Yaroslavl Jr. (Russia)
229	Derek Meech (D)	Canada	Detroit Red Wings	Red Deer Rebels (WHL)

1. Tampa Bay's seventh-round pick went to Philadelphia as the result of a trade on June 24, 2001 that sent an eighth-round pick in the 2001 entry draft and a ninth-round pick in the 2002 Entry Draft to Tampa Bay in exchange for this pick
2. Anaheim's seventh-round pick went to Minnesota as the result of a trade on November 1, 2001 that sent Sergei Krivokrasov to Anaheim in exchange for future considerations and this pick.
3. Minnesota's seventh-round pick went to Edmonton as the result of a trade on June 29, 2001 that sent Sergei Zholtok to Minnesota in exchange for future considerations (this pick).
4. The Rangers' seventh-round pick went to Calgary as the result of a trade on June 24, 2001 that sent a seventh-round pick in the 2001 entry draft to the Rangers in exchange for this pick.
5. Ottawa's seventh-round pick went to Tampa Bay as the result of a trade on June 23, 2002 that sent Josef Boumedienne to Ottawa in exchange for this pick.
6. Atlanta's acquired seventh-round pick went to San Jose as the result of a trade on June 23, 2002 that sent an eighth-round in the 2002 Entry Draft and a seventh-round pick in the 2003 entry draft to Atlanta in exchange for this pick.
  Atlanta previously acquired this pick as the result of a trade on June 24, 2001 that sent a third-round pick in the 2002 Entry Draft to New Jersey in exchange for a fourth-round pick in the 2001 entry draft and this pick.
7. New Jersey acquired this pick as the result of a compensation for the Islanders signing Ken Sutton as a Group III free agent on July 5, 2001.
8. Vancouver acquired this pick as the result of a compensation for Buffalo signing Bob Essensa as a Group III free agent on August 3, 2001.
9. Philadelphia's seventh-round pick went to Columbus as the result of a trade on June 23, 2002 that sent a fifth-round pick in the 2002 Entry Draft to Philadelphia in exchange for a sixth-round pick in the 2002 Entry Draft and this pick
10. San Jose's seventh-round pick went to the Rangers as the result of a trade on June 29, 2001 that sent Rich Pilon to San Jose in exchange for this pick.

=== Round eight ===
#	Player	Nationality	NHL team	College/junior/club team
230	Colton Fretter	Canada	Atlanta Thrashers	Chatham Maroons (WOHL)
231	Jaroslav Kracik	Czech Republic	Columbus Blue Jackets	HC Plzen Jr. (Czech Republic)
232	Peter Hafner (D)	United States	Florida Panthers	Taft High School (USHS–CT)
233	Vasily Koshechkin (G)	Russia	Tampa Bay Lightning	Lada Togliatti (Russia)
234	Maxime Talbot	Canada	Pittsburgh Penguins	Hull Olympiques (QMJHL)
235	Kaleb Betts	Canada	Nashville Predators	Chilliwack Chiefs (BCHL)
236	Tyler Boldt (D)	Canada	Atlanta Thrashers (from Anaheim)^{1}	Kamloops Blazers (WHL)
237	Christoph Brandner	Austria	Minnesota Wild	Krefeld Pinguine (Germany)
238	Jyri Marttinen (D)	Finland	Calgary Flames	JYP (Finland)
239	Ryan Lannon (D)	United States	Pittsburgh Penguins (compensatory)^{2}	Harvard University (ECAC)
240	Petr Prucha	Czech Republic	New York Rangers	HC Pardubice (Czech Republic)
241	Dennis Wideman (D)	Canada	Buffalo Sabres	London Knights (OHL)
242	Igor Ignatushkin	Russia	Washington Capitals	Elemash Elektrosal (Russia)
243	Tuomas Mikkonen	Finland	Dallas Stars	JYP (Finland)
244	Dwight Helminen	United States	Edmonton Oilers	University of Michigan (Big Ten)
245	Tomas Micka	Czech Republic	Edmonton Oilers (from Montreal)^{3}	Slavia Prague Jr. (Czech Republic)
246	Josef Vavra	Czech Republic	Ottawa Senators	HC Vsetin Jr. (Czech Republic)
247	Matt Violin (G)	Canada	Vancouver Canucks	Lake Superior State University (WCHA)
248	Tuukka Pulliainen	Finland	Los Angeles Kings	TuTo (Finland)
249	Marcus Smith (D)	United States	Phoenix Coyotes	Kitchener Rangers (OHL)
250	Dan Glover (D)	Canada	New Jersey Devils	Camrose Kodiaks (AJHL)
251	Jared Jessiman	Canada	Chicago Blackhawks	Hull Olympiques (QMJHL)
252	Martin Chabada	Czech Republic	New York Islanders	Sparta Prague (Czech Republic)
253	Tom Koivisto (D)	Finland	St. Louis Blues	Jokerit (Finland)
254	Jarkko Immonen	Finland	Toronto Maple Leafs	JYP (Finland)
255	Ryan Craig	Canada	Tampa Bay Lightning (from Carolina)^{4}	Brandon Wheat Kings (WHL)
256	Darren Reid	Canada	Tampa Bay Lightning (from Philadelphia via Carolina)^{5}	Medicine Hat Tigers (WHL)
257	Pauli Levokari (D)	Finland	Atlanta Thrashers (from San Jose)^{6}	HIFK (Finland)
258	Sergei Shemetov	Russia	Colorado Avalanche	Elemash Elektrostal (Russia)
259	Yan Stastny	Canada	Boston Bruins	University of Notre Dame (Hockey East)
260	Pierre-Olivier Beaulieu (D)	Canada	Detroit Red Wings	Quebec Remparts (QMJHL)

1. Anaheim's eighth-round pick went to Atlanta as the result of a trade on July 2, 2001 that sent Denny Lambert and a ninth-round pick in the 2002 Entry Draft to Anaheim in exchange for this pick.
2. Pittsburgh acquired this pick as the result of a compensation for St. Louis signing Marc Bergevin as a Group III free agent on November 6, 2001.
3. Montreal's eighth-round pick went to Edmonton as the result of a trade on June 22, 2002 that sent a first-round pick (# 14 overall) in the 2002 Entry Draft to Montreal in exchange for a first-round pick (# 15 overall) in the 2002 Entry Draft and this pick.
4. Carolina's eighth-round pick went to Tampa Bay as the result of a trade on June 23, 2002 that sent a fourth-round pick in the 2003 entry draft to Carolina in exchange for a sixth, eighth (# 256 overall), ninth-round picks in the 2002 Entry Draft and this pick.
5. Carolina's acquired eighth-round pick went to Tampa Bay as the result of a trade on June 23, 2002 that sent a fourth-round pick in the 2003 entry draft to Carolina in exchange for a sixth, eighth (# 255 overall), ninth-round picks in the 2002 Entry Draft and this pick.
  Carolina previously acquired this pick as the result of a trade on May 31, 2000 that sent Paul Ranheim to Philadelphia in exchange for this pick.
6. San Jose's eighth-round pick went to Atlanta as the result of a trade on June 23, 2002 that sent a seventh-round in the 2002 Entry Draft to San Jose in exchange for a seventh-round pick in the 2003 entry draft and this pick.

=== Round nine ===
#	Player	Nationality	NHL team	College/junior/club team
261	Francois Caron (D)	Canada	Mighty Ducks of Anaheim (from Atlanta)^{1}	Moncton Wildcats (QMJHL)
262	Christian Soderstrom	Sweden	Detroit Red Wings (from Columbus)^{2}	Timra IK (Sweden)
263	Sergei Mozyakin	Russia	Columbus Blue Jackets (from Florida)^{3}	CSKA Moscow (Russia)
264	Matthew Davis (G)	Canada	Nashville Predators (from Tampa Bay via Colorado)^{4}	Moncton Wildcats (QMJHL)
265	Dwight LaBrosse (G)	United States	Pittsburgh Penguins	Guelph Storm (OHL)
266	Steven Spencer (D)	Canada	Nashville Predators	Swift Current Broncos (WHL)
267	Chris Petrow (D)	Canada	Mighty Ducks of Anaheim	Oshawa Generals (OHL)
268	Mikhail Tyulyapkin (D)	Russia	Minnesota Wild	Torpedo Nizhny Novgorod Jrs. (Russia)
269	Mika Hannula	Sweden	Minnesota Wild (from Calgary)^{5}	Malmo IF (Sweden)
270	Rob Flynn	United States	New York Rangers	Harvard University (ECAC)
271	Martin Cizek (D)	Czech Republic	Buffalo Sabres	Slavia Prague Jr. (Czech Republic)
272	Patric Blomdahl	Sweden	Washington Capitals	AIK IF Jr. (Sweden)
273	Ned Havern	United States	Dallas Stars	Boston College (Hockey East)
274	Fredrik Johansson	Sweden	Edmonton Oilers	Vastra Frolunda HC Jr. (Sweden)
275	Konstantin Korneyev (D)	Russia	Montreal Canadiens	Krylya Sovetov (Russia)
276	Vitaly Atyushov (D)	Russia	Ottawa Senators	Molot-Prikamie Perm (Russia)
277	Thomas Nussli	Switzerland	Vancouver Canucks	EV Zug (NLA)
278	Matt Gens (D)	United States	Vancouver Canucks (compensatory)^{6}	St. Cloud State University (NCHC)
279	Connor James	Canada	Los Angeles Kings	University of Denver (NCHC)
280	Russell Spence	Canada	Phoenix Coyotes	OCN Blizzard (MJHL)
281	Bill Kinkel	United States	New Jersey Devils	Kitchener Rangers (OHL)
282	Adam Burish	United States	Chicago Blackhawks	Green Bay Gamblers (USHL)
283	Per Braxenholm (D)	Sweden	New York Islanders	Morrums GoIS IK (Sweden)
284	Ryan MacMurchy	Canada	St. Louis Blues	Notre Dame Hounds (SJHL)
285	Staffan Kronwall (D)	Sweden	Toronto Maple Leafs	Huddinge IK (Sweden)
286	Alexei Glukhov	Russia	Tampa Bay Lightning (from Carolina)^{7}	Khimik Voskresensk Jr. (Russia)
287	John Toffey	United States	Tampa Bay Lightning (from Philadelphia)^{8}	Ohio State University (Big Ten)
288	Michael Hutchins (D)	United States	San Jose Sharks	Des Moines Buccaneers (USHL)
289	Sean Collins	United States	Colorado Avalanche	University of New Hampshire (Hockey East)
290	Pavel Frolov	Russia	Boston Bruins	Torpedo Nizhny Novgorod Jrs. (Russia)
291	Jonathan Ericsson (D)	Sweden	Detroit Red Wings	Hasten Hockey (Sweden)

1. Atlanta's ninth-round pick went to Anaheim as the result of a trade on July 2, 2001 that sent an eighth-round pick in the 2002 Entry Draft to Atlanta in exchange for Denny Lambert and this pick.
2. Columbus' ninth-round pick went to Detroit as the result of a trade on June 25, 2000 that sent a ninth-round pick in the 2000 entry draft to Columbus in exchange for this pick.
3. Florida's ninth-round pick went to Columbus as the result of a trade on June 23, 2002 that sent a ninth-round pick in the 2003 entry draft to Florida in exchange for this pick.
4. Colorado's acquired ninth-round pick went to Nashville as the result of a trade on March 1, 2002 that sent a ninth-round pick in the D.J. Smith to Colorado in exchange for this pick.
  Colorado previously acquired this pick as the result of a trade on June 24, 2001 that sent a ninth-round pick in the 2001 entry draft to Tampa Bay in exchange for this pick.
5. Calgary's ninth-round pick went to Minnesota as the result of a trade on June 22, 2002 that sent Jamie McLennan to Calgary in exchange for this pick.
6. Vancouver acquired this pick as the result of a compensation for Dallas signing Greg Hawgood as a Group III free agent on July 17, 2001.
7. Carolina's ninth-round pick went to Tampa Bay as the result of a trade on June 23, 2002 that sent a fourth-round pick in the 2003 entry draft to Carolina in exchange for a sixth, two eighth-round picks (# 255 & # 256 overall) in the 2002 Entry Draft and this pick.
8. Philadelphia's ninth-round pick went to Tampa Bay as the result of a trade on June 24, 2001 that sent a seventh-round pick in the 2002 Entry Draft to Philadelphia in exchange for an eighth-round pick in the 2001 entry draft and this pick.

== Draftees based on nationality ==
Rank	Country	Picks	Percent	Top selection
	North America	168	57.7%	
1	Canada	109	43.2%	Rick Nash, 1st
2	United States	59	20.2%	Ryan Whitney, 5th
	Europe	123	42.3%	
3	Russia	33	11.3%	Alexander Semin, 13th
4	Czech Republic	26	8.9%	Petr Taticek, 9th
5	Finland	25	8.6%	Kari Lehtonen, 2nd
6	Sweden	21	7.2%	Alexander Steen, 24th
7	Switzerland	5	1.7%	Tobias Stephan, 34th
8	Slovakia	3	1.0%	Tomas Troliga, 89th
8	Latvia	3	1.0%	Jekabs Redlihs, 119th
10	Norway	2	0.7%	Marius Holtet, 42nd
11	Hungary	1	0.3%	Janos Vas, 32nd
11	Ukraine	1	0.3%	Andriy Mikhnov, 62nd
11	Denmark	1	0.3%	Frans Nielsen, 87th
11	Austria	1	0.7%	Christoph Brandner, 237th

== See also ==
- 2002–03 NHL season
- List of NHL first overall draft choices
- List of NHL players
