= Krikunov =

Krikunov (Russian: Крикунов) is a Russian masculine surname, its feminine counterpart is Krikunova. Notable people with the surname include:

- Ilya Krikunov (born 1984), Russian ice hockey player
- Vladimir Krikunov (born 1950), Russian ice hockey player
