= Igor Ignatushkin =

Russian ice hockey player (born 1984)

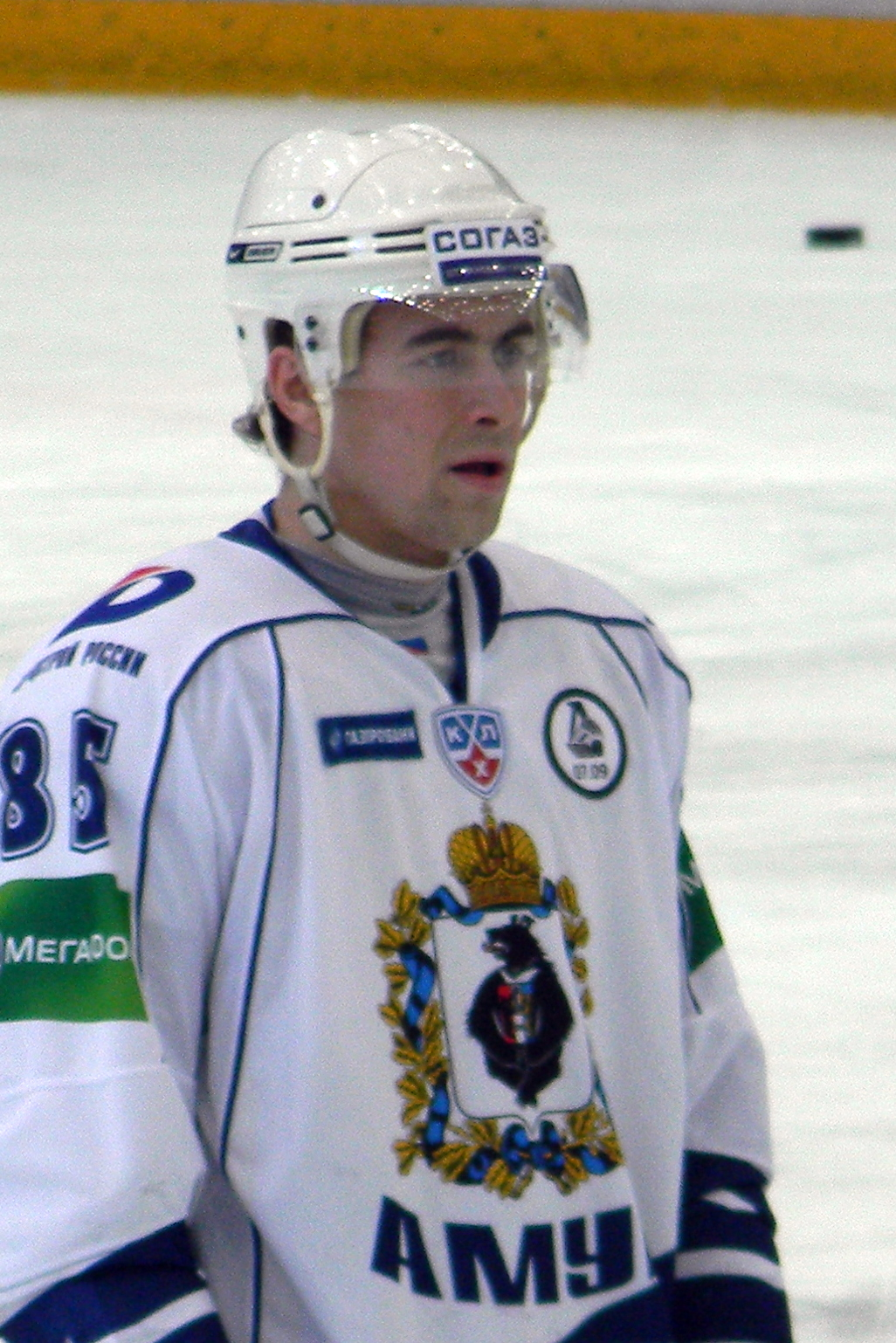
- Born: 7 April 1984 (age 42) Elektrostal, Russian SFSR
- Height: 6 ft 0 in (183 cm)
- Weight: 192 lb (87 kg; 13 st 10 lb)
- Position: Centre
- Shoots: Left
- VHL team Former teams: CSK VVS Samara; Atlant Mytishchi; Amur Khabarovsk; Sibir Novosibirsk; HC Sochi; Dynamo Moscow; HC Košice
- NHL draft: 242nd overall, 2002; Washington Capitals
- Playing career: 2001–present

Igor Ignatushkin (born April 7, 1984) is a Russian professional ice hockey centre who is currently playing with CSK VVS Samara of the Supreme Hockey League (VHL). Ignatushki was selected by Washington Capitals in the 8th round (242nd overall) of the 2002 NHL entry draft. He played three years with HC Sochi before signing as a free agent to a one-year contract with Dynamo Moscow on July 7, 2017.

== Career statistics ==
=== Regular season and playoffs ===
| | | | Regular season | | | | | Playoffs |
| Season | Team | League | GP | G | A | Pts | PIM | GP | G | A | Pts | PIM |
|---|---|---|---|---|---|---|---|---|---|---|---|---|
| 1999–2000 | Kristall–2 Elektrostal | RUS.3 | 5 | 0 | 0 | 0 | 0 | — | — | — | — | — |
| 2000–01 | Elemash–2 Elektrostal | RUS.3 | 15 | 2 | 2 | 4 | 6 | — | — | — | — | — |
| 2001–02 | Elemash Elektrostal | RUS.2 | 46 | 1 | 4 | 5 | 20 | — | — | — | — | — |
| 2001–02 | Elemash–2 Elektrostal | RUS.3 | 6 | 2 | 3 | 5 | 6 | — | — | — | — | — |
| 2002–03 | Elemash Elektrostal | RUS.2 | 36 | 9 | 10 | 19 | 8 | — | — | — | — | — |
| 2002–03 | Elemash–2 Elektrostal | RUS.3 | 4 | 1 | 1 | 2 | 2 | — | — | — | — | — |
| 2003–04 | Kristall Elektrostal | RUS.2 | 49 | 6 | 2 | 8 | 22 | — | — | — | — | — |
| 2004–05 | Kristall Elektrostal | RUS.2 | 45 | 9 | 3 | 12 | 28 | — | — | — | — | — |
| 2004–05 | Neftyanik Leninogorsk | RUS.2 | 6 | 1 | 1 | 2 | 6 | 4 | 1 | 0 | 1 | 4 |
| 2005–06 | Khimik Moscow Oblast | RSL | 7 | 0 | 0 | 0 | 2 | — | — | — | — | — |
| 2005–06 | Kristall–2 Elektrostal | RUS.3 | 46 | 22 | 23 | 45 | 48 | — | — | — | — | — |
| 2006–07 | Kristall Elektrostal | RUS.2 | 49 | 14 | 23 | 37 | 48 | — | — | — | — | — |
| 2007–08 | Amur Khabarovsk | RSL | 49 | 4 | 4 | 8 | 12 | 4 | 0 | 0 | 0 | 2 |
| 2007–08 | Amur–2 Khabarovsk | RUS.3 | 2 | 0 | 0 | 0 | 0 | — | — | — | — | — |
| 2008–09 | Amur Khabarovsk | KHL | 49 | 6 | 8 | 14 | 16 | — | — | — | — | — |
| 2009–10 | Amur Khabarovsk | KHL | 47 | 10 | 10 | 20 | 20 | — | — | — | — | — |
| 2010–11 | Amur Khabarovsk | KHL | 32 | 8 | 2 | 10 | 16 | — | — | — | — | — |
| 2011–12 | Amur Khabarovsk | KHL | 44 | 10 | 4 | 14 | 24 | 4 | 0 | 1 | 1 | 2 |
| 2012–13 | Atlant Moscow Oblast | KHL | 45 | 8 | 10 | 18 | 37 | 5 | 0 | 0 | 0 | 2 |
| 2013–14 | Sibir Novosibirsk | KHL | 48 | 3 | 3 | 6 | 18 | 10 | 1 | 0 | 1 | 2 |
| 2014–15 | HC Sochi | KHL | 60 | 10 | 16 | 26 | 34 | 4 | 0 | 0 | 0 | 0 |
| 2015–16 | HC Sochi | KHL | 58 | 12 | 20 | 32 | 18 | 4 | 0 | 0 | 0 | 4 |
| 2016–17 | HC Sochi | KHL | 46 | 5 | 13 | 18 | 18 | — | — | — | — | — |
| 2017–18 | Dynamo Moscow | KHL | 30 | 5 | 10 | 15 | 8 | — | — | — | — | — |
| 2018–19 | HC Ryazan | VHL | 18 | 2 | 2 | 4 | 2 | — | — | — | — | — |
| 2019–20 | HC Tambov | VHL | 54 | 14 | 15 | 29 | 24 | — | — | — | — | — |
| 2020–21 | CSK VVS Samara | VHL | 49 | 10 | 17 | 27 | 14 | — | — | — | — | — |
| 2021–22 | CSK VVS Samara | VHL | 15 | 0 | 4 | 4 | 0 | — | — | — | — | — |
| 2021–22 | HC Tambov | VHL | 29 | 1 | 8 | 9 | 14 | — | — | — | — | — |
| RUS.2 & VHL totals | | | 396 | 67 | 89 | 156 | 186 | 4 | 1 | 0 | 1 | 4 |
| RSL totals | | | 56 | 4 | 4 | 8 | 14 | 4 | 0 | 0 | 0 | 2 |
| KHL totals | | | 459 | 77 | 96 | 173 | 209 | 27 | 1 | 1 | 2 | 10 |

=== International ===
| Year | Team | Event | GP | G | A | Pts | PIM |
|---|---|---|---|---|---|---|---|
| 2001 | Russia | U18 | 5 | 2 | 4 | 6 | 4 |
| 2002 | Russia | WJC18 | 8 | 2 | 9 | 11 | 2 |
| Junior totals | | | 13 | 4 | 13 | 17 | 6 |
