= Mikhail Tyulyapkin =

Russian ice hockey player

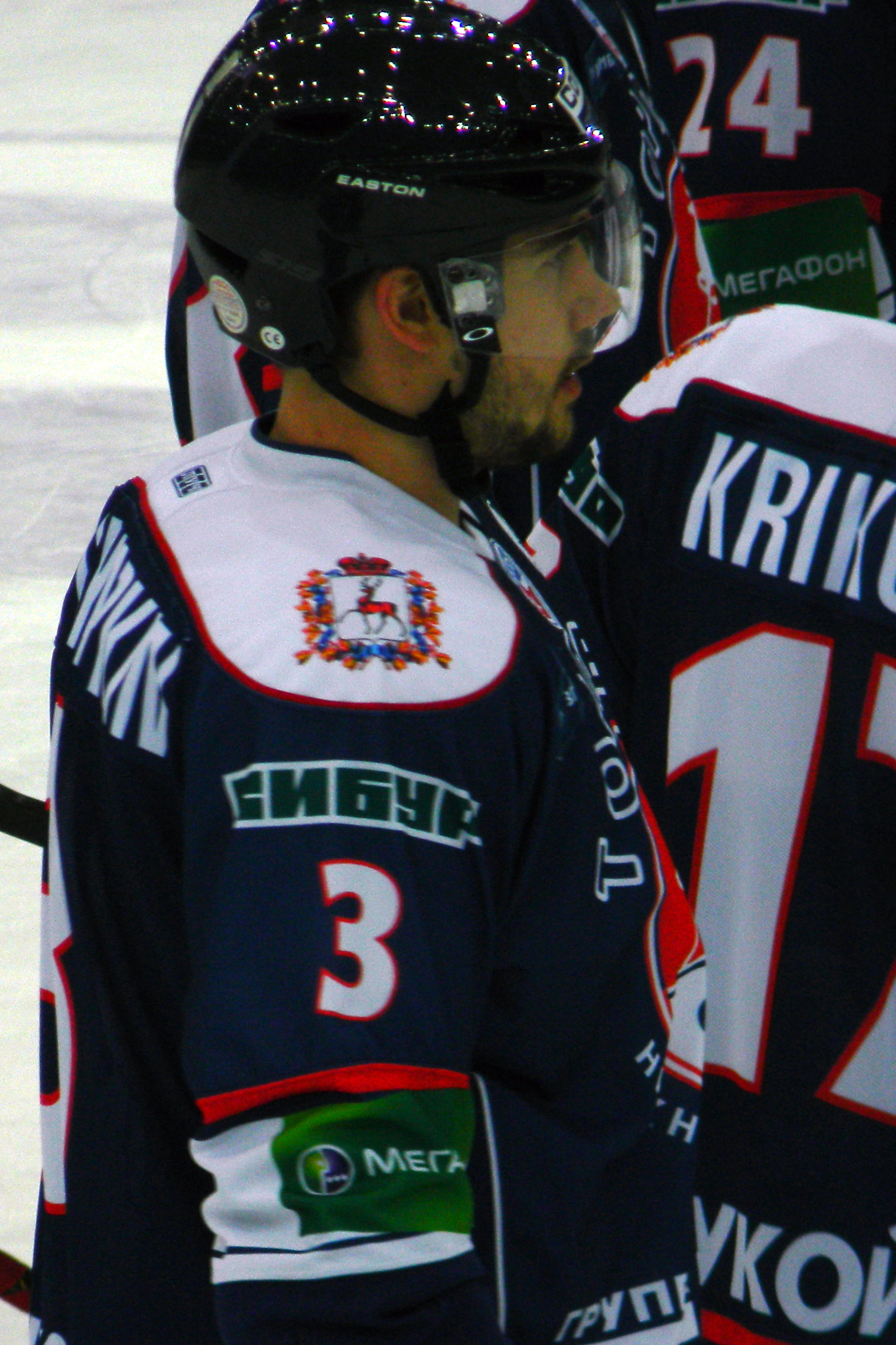
- Born: May 4, 1984 (age 42) Nizhny Novgorod, USSR
- Height: 6 ft 2 in (188 cm)
- Weight: 240 lb (109 kg; 17 st 2 lb)
- Position: Defence
- Shot: Left
- team: Free Agent
- Played for: Torpedo Nizhny Novgorod; Metallurg Novokuznetsk; Ak Bars Kazan; HC Yugra; Atlant Moscow Oblast; Amur Khabarovsk
- NHL draft: 268th overall, 2002; Minnesota Wild
- Playing career: 2003–2017

Mikhail Tyulyapkin (born May 4, 1984) is a Russian former professional ice hockey defenceman. He most recently played with Amur Khabarovsk of the Kontinental Hockey League (KHL) before he was released from his contract after two games due to injury. He previously played for Atlant Moscow Oblast of the KHL. He was selected by the Minnesota Wild in the 9th round (268th overall) of the 2002 NHL entry draft.

== Career statistics ==
			Regular season					Playoffs
Season	Team	League	GP	G	A	Pts	PIM	GP	G	A	Pts	PIM
2000–01	Torpedo Nizhny Novgorod-2	Russia3	25	4	4	8	46	—	—	—	—	—
2001–02	Torpedo Nizhny Novgorod-2	Russia3	34	1	6	7	54	—	—	—	—	—
2001–02	HC CSKA Moscow-2	Russia3	1	0	0	0	0	—	—	—	—	—
2002–03	Torpedo Nizhny Novgorod	Russia2	47	2	4	6	65	13	0	1	1	6
2002–03	Torpedo Nizhny Novgorod-2	Russia3	2	0	0	0	4	—	—	—	—	—
2003–04	Torpedo Nizhny Novgorod	Russia	51	0	5	5	53	—	—	—	—	—
2004–05	Metallurg Novokuznetsk	Russia	43	2	4	6	22	4	0	0	0	4
2004–05	Metallurg Novokuznetsk-2	Russia3	4	0	1	1	6	—	—	—	—	—
2005–06	Metallurg Novokuznetsk	Russia	51	2	5	7	42	3	0	1	1	6
2005–06	Metallurg Novokuznetsk-2	Russia3	1	0	1	1	0	—	—	—	—	—
2006–07	Ak Bars Kazan	Russia	40	0	2	2	63	5	0	0	0	2
2006–07	Ak Bars Kazan-2	Russia3	1	1	1	2	2	—	—	—	—	—
2007–08	Ak Bars Kazan	Russia	19	0	3	3	41	—	—	—	—	—
2007–08	Ak Bars Kazan-2	Russia3	20	5	16	21	10	—	—	—	—	—
2008–09	Torpedo Nizhny Novgorod	KHL	39	3	5	8	20	3	0	0	0	8
2008–09	Torpedo Nizhny Novgorod-2	Russia3	4	3	4	7	0	—	—	—	—	—
2009–10	Torpedo Nizhny Novgorod	KHL	43	1	9	10	24	—	—	—	—	—
2010–11	Yugra Khanty-Mansiysk	KHL	44	1	9	10	37	6	1	2	3	0
2011–12	Torpedo Nizhny Novgorod	KHL	32	0	1	1	12	10	0	0	0	2
2012–13	Torpedo Nizhny Novgorod	KHL	32	1	4	5	14	—	—	—	—	—
2013–14	Yugra Khanty-Mansiysk	KHL	24	2	4	6	12	—	—	—	—	—
2014–15	Atlant Mytishchi	KHL	49	1	3	4	35	—	—	—	—	—
2015–16	Amur Khabarovsk	KHL	2	0	0	0	0	—	—	—	—	—
2016–17	HC Sarov	VHL	33	0	5	5	22	—	—	—	—	—
2016–17	Torpedo Nizhny Novgorod	KHL	1	0	0	0	0	—	—	—	—	—
KHL totals			266	9	35	44	154	19	1	2	3	10
Russia totals			204	4	19	23	221	12	0	1	1	12
