= Viktor Baldayev =

Russian ice hockey player (born 1995)

- Born: June 14, 1995 (age 31) Elektrostal, Russia
- Height: 6 ft 3 in (191 cm)
- Weight: 207 lb (94 kg; 14 st 11 lb)
- Position: Defence
- Shoots: Left
- KHL team Former teams: HC Sochi; Atlant Moscow Oblast; Spartak Moscow; HC Karlovy Vary; Torpedo Nizhny Novgorod; Severstal Cherepovets; Kunlun Red Star; Amur Khabarovsk
- NHL draft: Undrafted
- Playing career: 2014–present

Viktor Baldayev (born June 14, 1995) is a Russian professional ice hockey defenceman. He is currently playing with HC Sochi of the Kontinental Hockey League (KHL).

== Playing career ==
Baldayev made his KHL debut playing with Atlant Moscow Oblast during the 2014–15 KHL season. He played two seasons of major junior hockey in the CHL with the Rouyn-Noranda Huskies and Chicoutimi Saguenéens of the Quebec Major Junior Hockey League (QMJHL).
