= Mikhail Lyubushin =

Russian ice hockey player (born 1983)

- Born: July 24, 1983 (age 42) Moscow, Soviet Union
- Height: 6 ft 2 in (188 cm)
- Weight: 216 lb (98 kg; 15 st 6 lb)
- Position: Defence
- Shot: Left
- Played for: Krylya Sovetov Moscow; HC Khimik Voskresensk; Severstal Cherepovets; Avangard Omsk; Torpedo Nizhny Novgorod; Metallurg Magnitogorsk
- NHL draft: 215th overall, 2002; Los Angeles Kings
- Playing career: 2001–2015

Mikhail Lyubushin (born July 24, 1983) is a Russian former professional ice hockey player. He played for Krylya Sovetov Moscow, HC Khimik Voskresensk, Severstal Cherepovets, Avangard Omsk, Torpedo Nizhny Novgorod and Metallurg Magnitogorsk. He was selected by Los Angeles Kings in the 7th round (215th overall) of the 2002 NHL entry draft.

== Career statistics ==
=== Regular season and playoffs ===
			Regular season					Playoffs
Season	Team	League	GP	G	A	Pts	PIM	GP	G	A	Pts	PIM
1999–2000	Vityaz–2 Podolsk	RUS.3	24	2	2	4	69	—	—	—	—	—
2000–01	Vityaz–2 Podolsk	RUS.3	3	1	1	2	18	—	—	—	—	—
2000–01	Krylia Sovetov Moscow	RUS.2	2	0	1	1	0	—	—	—	—	—
2000–01	Krylia Sovetov–2 Moscow	RUS.3	28	7	1	8	32	—	—	—	—	—
2001–02	THK Tver	RUS.2	22	1	0	1	18	—	—	—	—	—
2001–02	Krylia Sovetov Moscow	RSL	13	0	1	1	14	—	—	—	—	—
2001–02	Krylia Sovetov–2 Moscow	RUS.3	20	3	6	9	24	—	—	—	—	—
2002–03	Krylia Sovetov Moscow	RSL	49	0	6	6	26	—	—	—	—	—
2002–03	Krylia Sovetov–2 Moscow	RUS.3	4	1	1	2	6	—	—	—	—	—
2003–04	Dynamo Moscow	RSL	38	1	2	3	18	2	0	0	0	2
2003–04	Dynamo–2 Moscow	RUS.3	6	1	1	2	14	—	—	—	—	—
2004–05	Khimik Voskresensk	RSL	21	1	2	3	16	—	—	—	—	—
2004–05	HC Vityaz	RUS.2	8	0	2	2	6	14	1	0	1	8
2005–06	Severstal Cherepovets	RSL	23	1	4	5	10	—	—	—	—	—
2005–06	Avangard Omsk	RSL	26	0	1	1	20	8	0	0	0	4
2006–07	Avangard Omsk	RSL	21	0	1	1	16	3	0	0	0	2
2006–07	Avangard–2 Omsk	RUS.3	2	0	1	1	4	—	—	—	—	—
2007–08	Avangard Omsk	RSL	42	1	3	4	28	4	0	0	0	2
2008–09	Avangard Omsk	KHL	4	0	1	1	4	—	—	—	—	—
2008–09	Torpedo Nizhny Novgorod	KHL	25	0	2	2	32	1	0	0	0	2
2009–10	Torpedo Nizhny Novgorod	KHL	14	1	0	1	8	—	—	—	—	—
2010–11	Metallurg Magnitogorsk	KHL	25	0	1	1	12	—	—	—	—	—
2012–13	THK Tver	VHL	16	0	2	2	20	—	—	—	—	—
RSL totals			233	4	20	24	148	20	0	0	0	10
KHL totals			68	1	4	5	56	12	0	1	1	6

=== International ===
Year	Team	Event	GP	G	A	Pts	PIM
2003	Russia	WJC	6	0	2	2	0
Junior totals			6	0	2	2	0
