= Nikita Tochitsky =

Russian ice hockey player (born 1991)

- Born: August 17, 1991 (age 34) Khabarovsk, Russia
- Height: 6 ft 2 in (188 cm)
- Weight: 190 lb (86 kg; 13 st 8 lb)
- Position: Forward
- Shoots: Left
- Slovak team Former teams: HK 32 Liptovsky Mikulas; Atlant Moscow Oblast; Torpedo Nizhny Novgorod; HC Sibir Novosibirsk; HC Ugra; Avtomobilist Yekaterinburg; SKA Saint Petersburg; HC Sochi; HC Vityaz
- Playing career: 2011–present

Nikita Tochitsky (born August 17, 1991) is a Russian professional ice hockey player. He is currently playing with HK 32 Liptovsky Mikulas of the Slovak Extraliga (Slovak).

Tochitsky made his Kontinental Hockey League debut playing with Vityaz during the 2011–12 season. In the 2016–17 season, he was traded from SKA Saint Petersburg to HC Sochi on October 5, 2016.
