= Dmitri Ovchinnikov =

Russian ice hockey player (born 2002)

- Born: 19 August 2002 (age 24) Chita, Russia
- Height: 5 ft 11 in (180 cm)
- Weight: 163 lb (74 kg; 11 st 9 lb)
- Position: Forward
- Shoots: Left
- KHL team Former teams: HC Sochi; Sibir Novosibirsk; Toronto Marlies
- NHL draft: 137th overall, 2020; Toronto Maple Leafs
- Playing career: 2020–present

Dmitri Ovchinnikov (sometimes spelled Dmitry; born 19 August 2002) is a Russian professional ice hockey forward who currently plays for HC Sochi of the Kontinental Hockey League (KHL). He was selected by the Toronto Maple Leafs of the National Hockey League (NHL) 137th overall in 2020 NHL entry draft. He has also played for Sibir Novosibirsk of the Kontinental Hockey League (KHL).

== Playing career ==
Ovchinnikov played as a youth with Sibir Novosibirsk of the Kontinental Hockey League (KHL). He made his debut with the senior team during the 2019–20 season.

On 18 February 2022, Ovchinnikov signed a three-year, entry-level contract with the Toronto Maple Leafs of the National Hockey League (NHL) and was immediately assigned to the Toronto Marlies, the American Hockey League (AHL) affiliate of the Maple Leafs.

In advance of the 2022–23 season, Ovchinnikov returned to continue his development with Sibir Novosibirsk on loan from the Maple Leafs on 19 August 2022. Appearing in all 68 regular season games with Sibir Novosibirsk, he established new offensive highs with five goals and eight assists for 13 points. Ovchinnikov attended the Maple Leafs' 2023–24 training camp, but was assigned to the Marlies to start the 2023–24 season. On 8 March 2024, the Maple Leafs traded Ovchinnikov along with a 2026 fourth-round pick to the Minnesota Wild in exchange for forward Connor Dewar. He continued to play for the Marlies after the trade.

On 20 May 2024, he signed a deal to return to Sibir of the KHL. Minnesota did not retain his rights, opting not to give Ovchinnikov a qualifying offer. On 20 December 2024, Sibir Novosibirsk and Ovchinnikov opted to mutually terminate their deal. Ovchinnikov had seven scoreless games in his return after injury.

On 29 December 2024, Ovchinnikov signed with Metallurg Novokuznetsk of the Supreme Hockey League (VHL).

== Career statistics ==
			Regular season					Playoffs
Season	Team	League	GP	G	A	Pts	PIM	GP	G	A	Pts	PIM
2018–19	Sibirskie Snaipery	MHL	40	2	5	7	10	—	—	—	—	—
2019–20	Sibirskie Snaipery	MHL	54	24	31	55	8	1	0	0	0	0
2019–20	Sibir Novosibirsk	KHL	2	0	0	0	0	—	—	—	—	—
2020–21	Sibirskie Snaipery	MHL	40	20	31	51	2	—	—	—	—	—
2020–21	Sibir Novosibirsk	KHL	16	0	1	1	0	—	—	—	—	—
2021–22	Sibirskie Snaipery	MHL	22	13	16	29	4	—	—	—	—	—
2021–22	Sibir Novosibirsk	KHL	17	1	2	3	0	—	—	—	—	—
2021–22	Toronto Marlies	AHL	7	2	0	2	0	—	—	—	—	—
2022–23	Sibir Novosibirsk	KHL	68	5	8	13	8	3	0	0	0	0
2022–23	Toronto Marlies	AHL	4	0	0	0	0	—	—	—	—	—
2023–24	Toronto Marlies	AHL	21	7	3	10	4	—	—	—	—	—
2024–25	Sibir Novosibirsk	KHL	7	0	0	0	2	—	—	—	—	—
2024–25	Metallurg Novokuznetsk	VHL	25	6	10	16	2	7	0	1	1	0
2025–26	Metallurg Novokuznetsk	VHL	54	14	28	42	12	12	0	4	4	2
KHL totals			110	6	11	17	10	3	0	0	0	0
