= HC Sochi =

Professional ice hockey club based in Sochi, Russia

- City: Sochi, Russia
- League: Kontinental Hockey League
- Conference: Western
- Division: Bobrov
- Founded: 2014; 12 years ago
- Home arena: Bolshoy Ice Dome (capacity: 12,000)
- Colours: Teal, Navy, Gold, White
- Head coach: Andrei Mironov
- Captain: Dmitri Kagarlitsky
- Affiliates: HC Rostov (VHL); Kapitan Stupino (MHL)
- Website: hcsochi.ru

Franchise history
- 2014–: HC Sochi

Hockey Club Sochi (Russian: Хоккейный клуб Сочи) is a professional ice hockey club based in Sochi, Russia. It is a member of the Bobrov Division in the Kontinental Hockey League (KHL). The club joined the KHL in the 2014–15 season.

== History ==
Team logo from 2014 to 2016

Team logo from 2016 to 2024

On May 23, 2014, it was reported that Detroit Red Wings' pending restricted free agent centre Cory Emmerton had signed with HC Sochi to begin play in the Kontinental Hockey League with the 2014–15 season, becoming the first import player signed in franchise history.

In the club's inaugural season, Sochi were able to qualify for the play-off to compete for the Gagarin Cup, finishing in 13th place overall of the KHL. In its debut playoff series, Sochi were swept in the first round by HC CSKA Moscow in four games. In the following 2015–16 season, Sochi climbed to 4th place in the Western Conference, but again dropped out in the first round of play-off, suffering another sweep at the hands of HC Dynamo Moscow.

Evgeny Stavrovsky became the new head coach on October 15 of the 2020–21 season. In preparation for the 2020–21 season, having competed in the Tarasov Division, Sochi was moved to the Bobrov Division to alleviate any potential issues with teams transiting during the COVID-19 pandemic.

== Season-by-season record ==
Note: GP = Games played, W = Wins, L = Losses, OTL = Overtime/shootout losses, Pts = Points, GF = Goals for, GA = Goals against

Season	GP	W	L	OTL	Pts	GF	GA	Finish	Top Scorer	Playoffs
2014–15	60	28	23	9	88	164	170	5th, Tarasov	Ilya Krikunov (41 points: 16 G, 25 A; 55 GP)	Lost in Conference Quarterfinals, 0-4 (CSKA Moscow)
2015–16	60	34	16	10	108	175	149	3rd, Tarasov	André Petersson (44 points: 22 G, 22 A; 45 GP)	Lost in Conference Quarterfinals, 0-4 (Dynamo Moscow)
2016–17	60	31	27	2	88	139	145	5th, Tarasov	Ilya Krikunov (35 points: 12 G, 23 A; 54 GP)	Did not qualify
2017–18	56	29	27	15	87	130	138	4th, Tarasov	Eric O'Dell (32 points: 14 G, 18 A; 47 GP)	Lost in Conference Quarterfinals, 1-4 (Jokerit)
2018–19	62	28	24	10	66	145	155	3rd, Tarasov	Robert Rosén (40 points: 13 G, 27 A; 62 GP)	Lost in Conference Quarterfinals, 2-4 (Lokomotiv Yaroslavl)
2019–20	62	25	28	9	59	124	164	5th, Tarasov	Malte Strömwall (39 points: 21 G, 18 A; 52 GP)	Did not qualify
2020–21	60	14	37	9	37	121	202	6th, Bobrov	Sergei Shmelyov (43 points: 21 G, 22 A; 60 GP)	Did not qualify
2021–22	48	18	25	5	41	111	133	6th, Bobrov	Vasili Glotov (24 points: 13 G, 11 A; 43 GP)	Did not qualify
2022–23	68	11	47	10	32	142	254	5th, Bobrov	Artur Tyanulin (30 points: 13 G, 17 A; 55 GP)	Did not qualify
2023–24	68	23	38	7	53	168	254	4th, Bobrov	Artur Tyanulin (45 points: 17 G, 28 A; 63 GP)	Did not qualify
2024–25	68	20	41	7	47	153	226	5th, Bobrov	Artur Tyanulin (40 points: 10 G, 30 A; 49 GP)	Did not qualify
2025–26	68	18	42	8	44	139	233	5th, Bobrov	Daniil Seroukh (32 points: 12 G, 20 A; 56 GP)	Did not qualify

== Players ==
=== Current roster ===
Updated 27 September, 2026.

No.	Nat	Player	Pos	S/G	Age	Acquired	Birthplace
76	(Russia)	Timur Akhiyarov	D	L	27	2026	Ufa, Russia
1	(Russia)	Pyotr Andreyanov	G	L	19	2026	Volsk, Russia
74	(Russia)	Viktor Baldayev (A)	D	L	31	2026	Elektrostal, Russia
13	(Russia)	Yaroslav Belyakov	D	L	20	2026	Krasnoobsk, Russia
60	(Russia)	Ivan Bocharov	G	L	31	2026	Moscow, Russia
17	(Russia)	Ilya Fedotov	LW	R	23	2026	Saratov, Russia
18	(Russia)	Artur Gizdatullin	C	L	29	2026	Almetievsk, Russia
64	(Canada)	Jesse Graham	D	R	32	2026	Oshawa, Ontario, Canada
57	(Russia)	Artyom Guryev	D	L	23	2026	Moscow, Russia
77	(Russia)	Matvei Guskov (A)	C	L	25	2025	Nizhnekamsk, Russia
89	(Russia)	Nikita Guslistov	C	L	24	2026	Cherepovets, Russia
27	(Russia)	Dmitri Kagarlitsky (C)	F	R	37	2025	Cherepovets, Russia
86	(Russia)	Vladislav Kara	RW	L	28	2026	Salekhard, Russia
87	(Russia)	Timur Khafizov (A)	F	R	28	2022	Kazan, Russia
93	(Russia)	Alexander Khokhlachyov	RW	L	33	2026	Moscow, Russia
27	(Russia)	Maxim Korostelyov	RW	L	23	2026	St. Petersburg, Russia
67	(Canada)	Cam Lee	D	L	29	2025	Ferguson's Cove, Nova Scotia, Canada
88	(Russia)	Ilya Nikolayev	D	L	25	2025	Chelyabinsk, Russia
97	(Russia)	Dmitri Ovchinnikov	C	L	24	2026	Chita, Russia
15	(Russia)	Yegor Petukhov	RW	L	32	2026	Barnaul, Russia
14	(Russia)	Nikolai Polyakov	RW	L	26	2025	St. Petersburg, Russia
71	(United States)	Gage Quinney	C	L	31	2026	Las Vegas, Nevada, United States
39	(Russia)	Damir Shaimardanov	G	L	24	2026	Ufa, Russia
29	(Russia)	Kirill Slepets	RW	L	27	2026	Khabarovsk, Russia
62	(Russia)	Georgi Solyannikov	D	L	31	2026	St. Petersburg, Russia
51	(Belarus)	Ilya Sushko	D	R	28	2025	Drogichin, Belarus
10	(Russia)	Denis Vengryzhanovsky	F	R	25	2024	Gremyachevo, Russia
41	(Russia)	Kirill Voronin	RW	L	32	2026	Yaroslavl, Russia
22	(Canada)	Colby Williams	D	R	31	2026	Regina, Saskatchewan, Canada
42	(Russia)	Ivan Yezhov	RW	L	26	2026	Nizhnevartovsk, Russia

== Franchise records and leaders ==
=== KHL scoring leaders ===
These are the top-ten point-scorers in franchise history. Figures are updated after each completed KHL regular season.

Note: Pos = Position; GP = Games played; G = Goals; A = Assists; Pts = Points; P/G = Points per game; = current Sochi player

Points
Player	Pos	GP	G	A	Pts	P/G
(Russia) Artur Tyanulin	RW	193	44	89	133	0.69
(Russia) Ilya Krikunov	LW	194	44	77	121	0.62
(Sweden) André Petersson	RW	138	56	55	111	0.80
(Belarus) Andrei Kostitsyn	RW	133	47	57	104	0.78
(Russia) Sergei Shmelyov	LW	217	46	56	102	0.47
(Russia) Nikita Tochitsky	C	289	32	66	98	0.34
(Canada) Eric O'Dell	C	158	47	48	95	0.60
(Russia) Sergei Popov	LW	240	45	41	86	0.35
(Russia) Amir Garayev	C	265	35	49	84	0.32
(Russia) Daniil Seroukh	LW	158	37	43	80	0.50

Goals
Player	Pos	G
(Sweden) André Petersson	RW	56
(Belarus) Andrei Kostitsyn	RW	47
(Canada) Eric O'Dell	C	47
(Russia) Sergei Shmelyov	LW	46
(Russia) Sergei Popov	LW	45
(Russia) Artur Tyanulin	RW	44
(Russia) Ilya Krikunov	LW	44
(Russia) Timur Khafizov	C	39
(Russia) Daniil Seroukh	LW	37
(Russia) Amir Garayev	C	35

Assists
Player	Pos	A
(Russia) Artur Tyanulin	RW	89
(Russia) Ilya Krikunov	LW	77
(Russia) Nikita Tochitsky	C	66
(Russia) Yuri Alexandrov	D	60
(Belarus) Andrei Kostitsyn	RW	57
(Russia) Sergei Shmelyov	LW	56
(Sweden) André Petersson	RW	55
(Russia) Igor Ignatushkin	C	49
(Russia) Amir Garayev	C	49
(Canada) Eric O'Dell	C	48
