= Robin Jonsson =

Swedish ice hockey player

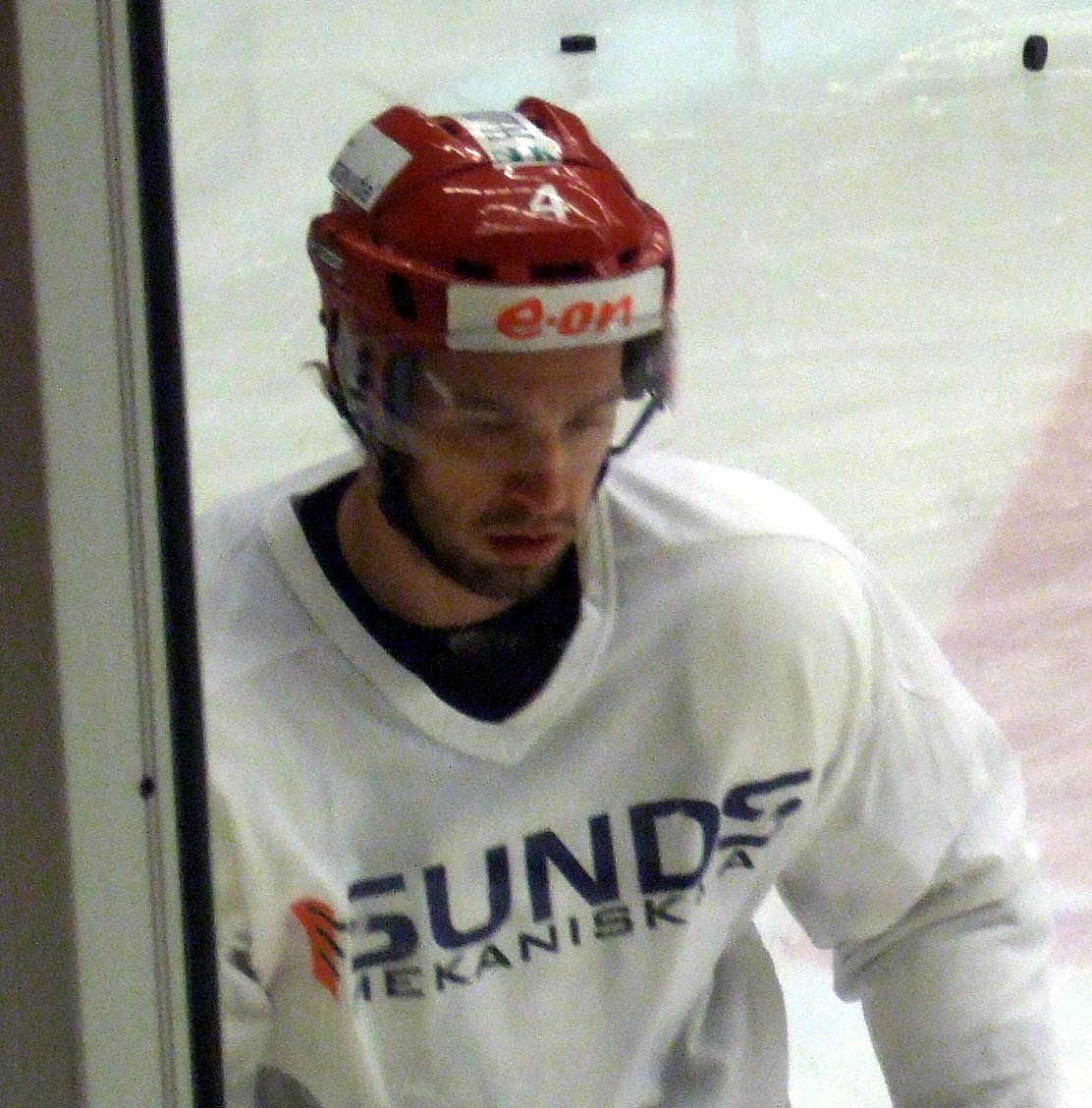
- Born: December 10, 1983 (age 42) Upplands-Väsby, Sweden
- Height: 6 ft 2 in (188 cm)
- Weight: 202 lb (92 kg; 14 st 6 lb)
- Position: Defence
- Shot: Right
- Played for: Färjestads BK; Timrå IK; Luleå HF; BIK Karlskoga
- NHL draft: 120th overall, 2002; St. Louis Blues
- Playing career: 2001–2015

Robin Jonsson (born December 10, 1983) is a Swedish former professional ice hockey player. He currently plays with Luleå HF of the Swedish Hockey League (SHL). Jonsson was selected by the St. Louis Blues in the 4th round (120th overall) of the 2002 NHL entry draft.

== Playing career ==
After suffering cancer early in his career Jonsson missed almost the entire 2002–03 season. But he did survive the cancer and came back to hockey. After playing with second-league team Bofors IK Jonsson moved back to elite team Färjestads BK, where is played as a junior, in the summer of 2003.

In January 2007 he was still playing for Färjestad, but with Bofors during brief loan-periods in the 2003–04 and 2004–05 seasons. In 2006, he won the Swedish Championship with Färjestad. In November 2007 he made his debut for the Swedish national team in a tournament in Finland.

On February 16, 2015, Jonsson announced that he was retiring as a player due to injuries.

== Career statistics ==
=== Regular season and playoffs ===
			Regular season					Playoffs
Season	Team	League	GP	G	A	Pts	PIM	GP	G	A	Pts	PIM
1999–2000	Färjestads BK	J18 Allsv	8	0	0	0	24	—	—	—	—	—
1999–2000	Färjestads BK	J20	18	2	2	4	12	—	—	—	—	—
2000–01	Färjestads BK	J20	21	2	6	8	32	3	1	2	3	2
2000–01	Färjestads BK	SEL	—	—	—	—	—	1	0	0	0	0
2001–02	Färjestads BK	SEL	1	0	0	0	0	—	—	—	—	—
2001–02	Bofors IK	Allsv	45	3	4	7	24	10	0	0	0	12
2002–03	Bofors IK	Allsv	7	0	2	2	6	—	—	—	—	—
2003–04	Bofors IK	Allsv	18	3	3	6	18	5	0	1	1	6
2003–04	Färjestads BK	SEL	28	0	0	0	10	—	—	—	—	—
2004–05	Bofors IK	Allsv	11	1	1	2	24	—	—	—	—	—
2004–05	Färjestads BK	SEL	47	0	2	2	12	15	0	0	0	2
2005–06	Färjestads BK	SEL	49	4	9	13	62	18	2	1	3	16
2006–07	Färjestads BK	SEL	35	3	5	8	44	9	1	0	1	12
2007–08	Timrå IK	SEL	54	2	6	8	68	11	1	4	5	16
2008–09	Timrå IK	SEL	51	0	6	6	60	7	0	0	0	12
2009–10	Luleå HF	SEL	36	1	2	3	18	—	—	—	—	—
2010–11	Luleå HF	SEL	53	0	3	3	22	13	1	1	2	10
2011–12	Luleå HF	SEL	46	2	3	5	24	5	0	0	0	0
2012–13	Luleå HF	SEL	49	2	8	10	24	13	0	0	0	4
2013–14	Luleå HF	SHL	41	0	3	3	18	—	—	—	—	—
2014–15	Luleå HF	SHL	4	0	0	0	2	—	—	—	—	—
SEL/SHL totals			494	14	47	61	364	92	5	6	11	72
Allsv totals			81	7	10	17	72	15	0	1	1	18

=== International ===
Year	Team	Event	GP	G	A	Pts	PIM
2001	Sweden	WJC18	6	0	0	0	4
Junior totals			6	0	0	0	4
