= Eric O'Dell =

Canadian ice hockey player (born 1990)

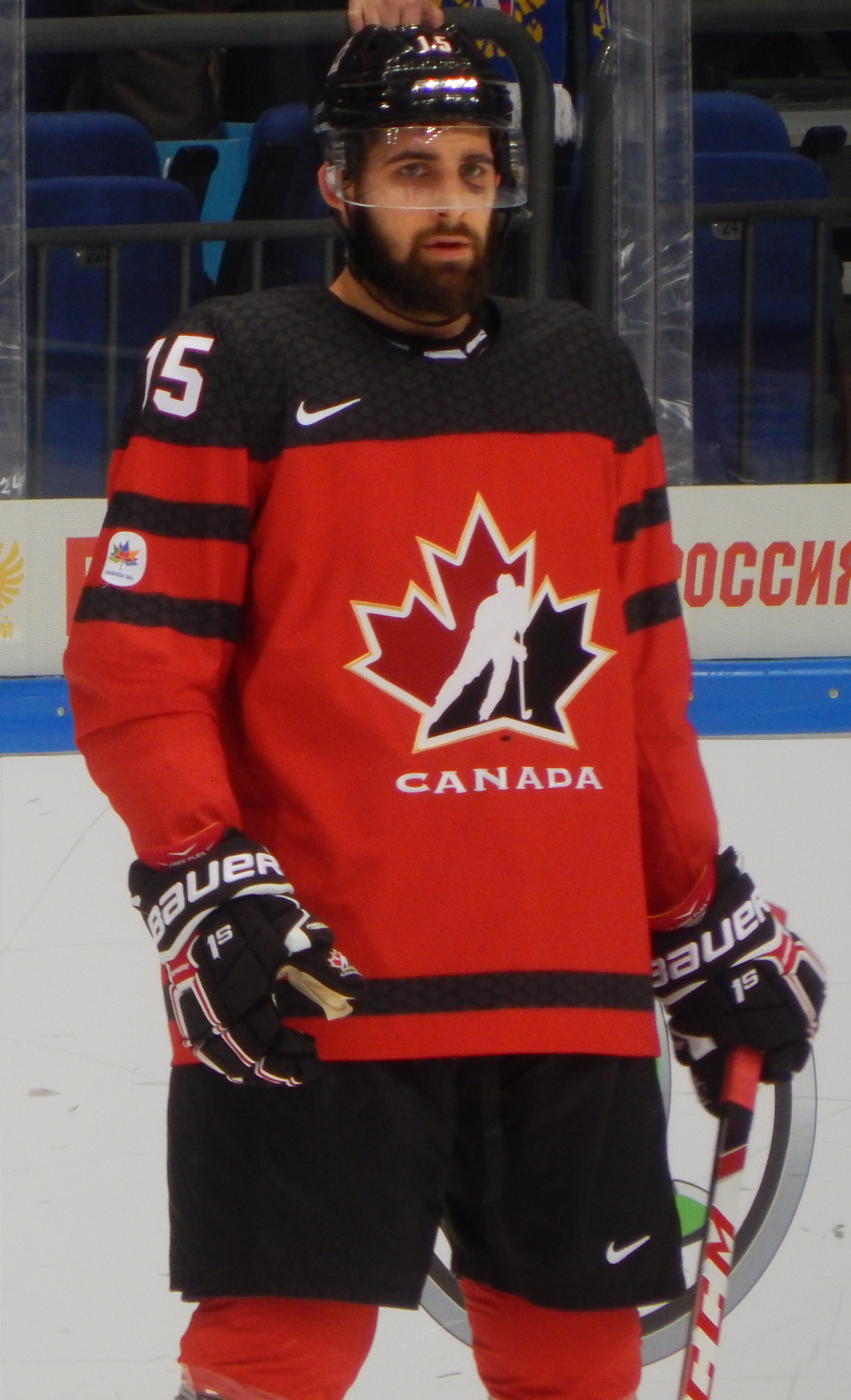
- O'Dell in 2017
- Born: June 21, 1990 (age 36) Ottawa, Ontario, Canada
- Height: 6 ft 0 in (183 cm)
- Weight: 207 lb (94 kg; 14 st 11 lb)
- Position: Centre
- Shoots: Right
- KHL team Former teams: Free agent Winnipeg Jets; HC Sochi; Metallurg Magnitogorsk; Sibir Novosibirsk; Dynamo Moscow; Ak Bars Kazan
- National team: Canada
- NHL draft: 39th overall, 2008; Anaheim Ducks
- Playing career: 2010–present

Eric O'Dell (born June 21, 1990) is a Canadian professional ice hockey player. He is currently an unrestricted free agent who most recently played with Ak Bars Kazan of the Kontinental Hockey League (KHL). O'Dell was originally selected by the Anaheim Ducks in the second round (39th overall) of the 2008 NHL entry draft and has played in the National Hockey League with the Winnipeg Jets.

== Playing career ==
O'Dell played four seasons (2007-2011) of major junior hockey in the Ontario Hockey League (OHL), where he scored 100 goals and 107 assists for 207 points in 198 games played. In 2008 O'Dell was selected to play as a member of the gold medal-winning Team Canada at the 2008 IIHF World U18 Championships, and during the 2009–10 season, he was chosen to represent his team at the OHL All-Star Game.

O'Dell made his professional debut in the American Hockey League with the Chicago Wolves during the 2009–10 season. On June 1, 2010, the Atlanta Thrashers signed O'Dell to an entry-level contract. After the Thrashers relocated at the end of the 2011-12 NHL season, and became the Winnipeg Jets, O'Dell would play three seasons with the St. John's Ice Caps of the AHL. In the 2013–14 season, O'Dell made his NHL debut, and on January 11, 2014, O'Dell scored his first NHL goal as a member of the Jets against Curtis McElhinney of the Columbus Blue Jackets.

On July 1, 2015, O'Dell left the Jets organization as a free agent and signed a one-year, two-way contract with the Ottawa Senators. O'Dell began the 2015–16 season with affiliate, the Binghamton Senators of the AHL, instantly adding offense to contribute with 37 points in 50 games before on February 27, 2016, the Senators traded O'Dell to the Buffalo Sabres as part of a seven-player deal.

As a free agent in the off-season, on August 9, 2016, O'Dell opted to embark on a career abroad, agreeing to a one-year deal with Russian club, HC Sochi of the KHL.

Following his third year with HC Sochi in the 2018–19 season, O'Dell left as a free agent to sign a one-year contract with fellow Russian club, Metallurg Magnitogorsk, on May 1, 2019. In the following 2019–20 season, O'Dell was unable to replicate his scoring rate with Metallurg, posting 6 goals and 17 points through 46 games.

O'Dell left Metallurg after his contract and signed an optional two-year contract as a free agent to continue in the KHL with HC Sibir Novosibirsk on June 2, 2020. In the following 2020–21 season, O'Dell was limited to just 9 games with Sibir, after sustaining an injury during October which ruled him out for the majority of the campaign.

Having concluded his contract with Sibir Novosibirsk, O'Dell left as a free agent and was signed to a one-year contract to continue in the KHL with HC Dynamo Moscow on July 20, 2021. In the 2021–22 season, O'Dell regained his scoring prowess, registering 13 goals and 32 points through 47 regular season games. He posted 8 points through 7 playoff contests before leaving the club during their conference semifinals against CSKA Moscow due to the 2022 Russian invasion of Ukraine on March 16, 2022.

As a free agent, O'Dell made a surprising return to Dynamo Moscow, agreeing to a one-year contract for the 2022–23 season on July 13, 2022.

On December 17, 2024, after recording six points in 14 games, O'Dell's contract was terminated by Dynamo. Two days later, O'Dell signed with another KHL team, Ak Bars Kazan, to play the remainder of the 2024–25 season.

== International play ==
Medal record

Representing Canada

Olympic Games
Bronze medal – third place	2018 Pyeongchang	

World Championship
Silver medal – second place	2022 Finland	

World U18 Championship
Gold medal – first place	2008 Kazan	

In January 2022, O'Dell was selected to play for Team Canada at the 2022 Winter Olympics.

== Career statistics ==
=== Regular season and playoffs ===
			Regular season					Playoffs
Season	Team	League	GP	G	A	Pts	PIM	GP	G	A	Pts	PIM
2006–07	Ottawa West Golden Knights	EOJHL	40	28	20	48	45	—	—	—	—	—
2006–07	Ottawa Jr. Senators	CJHL	2	1	0	1	0	—	—	—	—	—
2007–08	Cumberland Grads	CJHL	34	23	33	56	12	—	—	—	—	—
2007–08	Sudbury Wolves	OHL	26	14	18	32	19	—	—	—	—	—
2008–09	Sudbury Wolves	OHL	65	33	30	63	55	6	0	4	4	4
2009–10	Sudbury Wolves	OHL	68	33	35	68	63	4	0	2	2	2
2009–10	Chicago Wolves	AHL	3	0	0	0	0	—	—	—	—	—
2010–11	Sudbury Wolves	OHL	39	20	24	44	34	8	7	5	12	15
2011–12	St. John's IceCaps	AHL	39	12	10	22	27	3	0	0	0	2
2012–13	St. John's IceCaps	AHL	59	29	26	55	26	—	—	—	—	—
2013–14	St. John's IceCaps	AHL	42	17	25	42	35	21	9	5	14	20
2013–14	Winnipeg Jets	NHL	30	3	4	7	10	—	—	—	—	—
2014–15	St. John's IceCaps	AHL	37	14	15	29	34	—	—	—	—	—
2014–15	Winnipeg Jets	NHL	11	0	1	1	19	—	—	—	—	—
2015–16	Binghamton Senators	AHL	50	18	19	37	41	—	—	—	—	—
2015–16	Rochester Americans	AHL	17	7	4	11	8	—	—	—	—	—
2016–17	HC Sochi	KHL	50	11	13	24	24	—	—	—	—	—
2017–18	HC Sochi	KHL	47	14	18	32	73	5	2	2	4	6
2018–19	HC Sochi	KHL	61	22	17	39	52	5	1	1	2	27
2019–20	Metallurg Magnitogorsk	KHL	46	6	11	17	28	5	0	0	0	2
2020–21	Sibir Novosibirsk	KHL	9	1	2	3	18	—	—	—	—	—
2021–22	Dynamo Moscow	KHL	47	13	19	32	32	7	2	6	8	6
2022–23	Dynamo Moscow	KHL	35	16	15	31	43	6	5	2	7	2
2023–24	Dynamo Moscow	KHL	64	23	28	51	74	10	4	2	6	14
2024–25	Dynamo Moscow	KHL	14	2	4	6	14	—	—	—	—	—
2024–25	Ak Bars Kazan	KHL	22	2	2	4	16	13	3	4	7	8
NHL totals			41	3	5	8	29	—	—	—	—	—
KHL totals			395	110	129	239	374	51	17	17	34	65

=== International ===
Year	Team	Event	Result	GP	G	A	Pts	PIM
2008	Canada	U18	1st place, gold medalist(s)	7	1	3	4	8
2018	Canada	OG	3rd place, bronze medalist(s)	6	1	1	2	2
2022	Canada	OG	6th	5	2	3	5	2
2022	Canada	WC	2nd place, silver medalist(s)	3	1	0	1	0
Junior totals				7	1	3	4	8
Senior totals				14	4	4	8	4
