= Sergei Shmelyov =

Russian ice hockey player (born 1993)

- Born: August 28, 1993 (age 32) Nizhnekamsk, Russia
- Height: 5 ft 10 in (178 cm)
- Weight: 174 lb (79 kg; 12 st 6 lb)
- Position: Left wing
- Shoots: Left
- KHL team Former teams: Free agent Atlant Moscow Oblast; Spartak Moscow; HC Sochi; Salavat Yulaev Ufa; Admiral Vladivostok; Neftekhimik Nizhnekamsk
- Playing career: 2012–present

Sergei Yurevich Shmelyov or Sergei Shmelev (Russian: Сергей Юрьевич Шмелев born August 28, 1993) is a Russian professional ice hockey player who is currently a free agent. He last played with Neftekhimik Nizhnekamsk in the Kontinental Hockey League (KHL). He made his KHL debut playing with Atlant Moscow Oblast during the 2012–13 KHL season.

In his fourth season with HC Sochi, Shemlyov led the team in scoring during the 2020–21 season, collecting 21 goals and 43 points in 60 regular season games. As a free agent, Shmelyov was signed to a lucrative one-year contract with Salavat Yulaev Ufa on 6 May 2021.

Following three seasons with Salavat Yulaev Ufa, Shmelyov left as a free agent and secured a one-year contract with his fifth KHL outfit, Admiral Vladivostok, for the 2024–25 season on 16 August 2024. In October, he was traded to Neftekhimik Nizhnekamsk in exchange for Dmitri Sokolov. He terminated his deal with mutual agreement on November 5th after putting up 1 point in 10 games.
