= Ilya Krikunov =

Russian ice hockey player (born 1984)

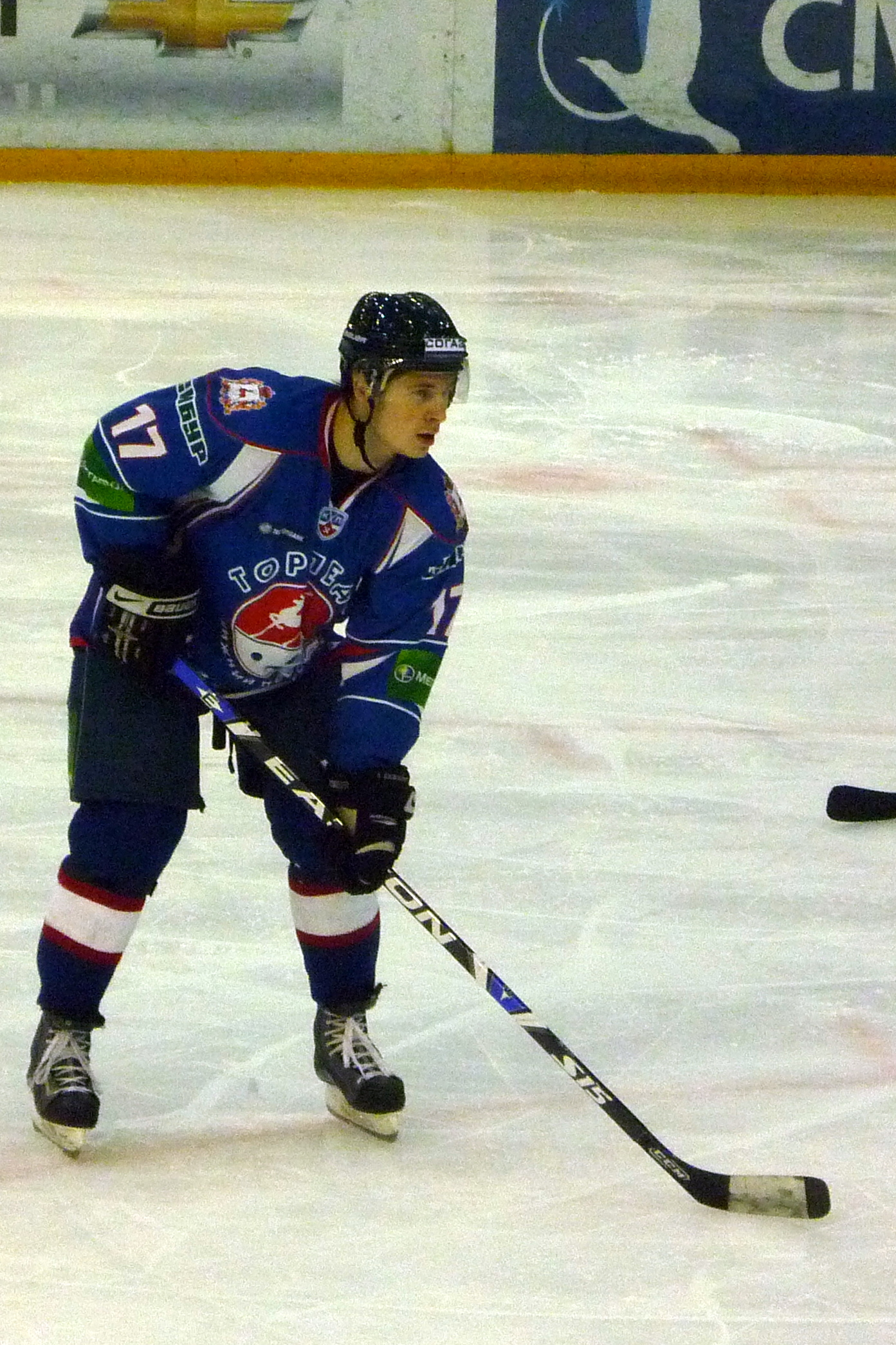
- Born: February 27, 1984 (age 42) Moscow, Russian SFSR
- Height: 5 ft 11 in (180 cm)
- Weight: 179 lb (81 kg; 12 st 11 lb)
- Position: Forward
- Shot: Left
- KHL team Former teams: Free Agent; Atlant Moscow Oblast; Torpedo Nizhny Novgorod; Avtomobilist Yekaterinburg; Amur Khabarovsk; HC Sochi; Salavat Yulaev Ufa; Kunlun Red Star
- NHL draft: 223rd overall, 2002; Vancouver Canucks
- Playing career: 2002–2021

Ilya Krikunov (born February 27, 1984) is a Russian professional ice hockey player who is currently an unrestricted free agent. He most recently played for Kunlun Red Star in the Kontinental Hockey League (KHL). He was selected by Vancouver Canucks in the 7th round (223rd overall) of the 2002 NHL entry draft.

On May 22, 2014, Krikunov signed as a free agent to a one-year contract with expansion club, HC Sochi. Krikunov broke out offensively in his three seasons with Sochi, collecting 112 points in 169 games before returning to former club, Avtomobilist Yekaterinburg on a one-year deal on May 3, 2017.

Krikunov played two further seasons with Avtomobilist before leaving as a free agent following the 2018–19 season, signing a two-year contract for a second stint with HC Sochi on May 1, 2019.

== Career statistics ==
=== Regular season and playoffs ===
| | | | Regular season | | | | | Playoffs |
| Season | Team | League | GP | G | A | Pts | PIM | GP | G | A | Pts | PIM |
|---|---|---|---|---|---|---|---|---|---|---|---|---|
| 1999–2000 | Kristall–2 Elektrostal | RUS.3 | 4 | 0 | 0 | 0 | 2 | — | — | — | — | — |
| 2000–01 | Elemash–2 Elektrostal | RUS.3 | 15 | 5 | 4 | 9 | 0 | — | — | — | — | — |
| 2000–01 | HK–2 Voronezh | RUS.3 | 2 | 1 | 0 | 1 | 2 | — | — | — | — | — |
| 2001–02 | Elemash Elektrostal | RUS.2 | 48 | 12 | 10 | 22 | 28 | — | — | — | — | — |
| 2001–02 | Elemash–2 Elektrostal | RUS.3 | 5 | 3 | 6 | 9 | 4 | — | — | — | — | — |
| 2002–03 | Elemash Elektrostal | RUS.2 | 48 | 19 | 9 | 28 | 34 | — | — | — | — | — |
| 2002–03 | Elemash–2 Elektrostal | RUS.3 | 1 | 0 | 0 | 0 | 0 | — | — | — | — | — |
| 2003–04 | Khimik Voskresensk | RSL | 50 | 10 | 9 | 19 | 14 | — | — | — | — | — |
| 2003–04 | Khimik–2 Voskresensk | RUS.3 | 3 | 4 | 3 | 7 | 2 | — | — | — | — | — |
| 2004–05 | Khimik Voskresensk | RSL | 58 | 9 | 14 | 23 | 20 | — | — | — | — | — |
| 2005–06 | Khimik Moscow Oblast | RSL | 46 | 10 | 5 | 15 | 57 | 8 | 1 | 1 | 2 | 2 |
| 2005–06 | Khimik Elektrostal | RUS.3 | 2 | 0 | 1 | 1 | 0 | — | — | — | — | — |
| 2006–07 | Khimik Moscow Oblast | RSL | 48 | 9 | 6 | 15 | 56 | 9 | 2 | 1 | 3 | 12 |
| 2006–07 | Khimik–2 Moscow Oblast | RUS.3 | 1 | 0 | 1 | 1 | 0 | — | — | — | — | — |
| 2007–08 | Khimik Moscow Oblast | RSL | 34 | 7 | 12 | 19 | 18 | 5 | 1 | 1 | 2 | 4 |
| 2008–09 | Atlant Moscow Oblast | KHL | 5 | 0 | 1 | 1 | 0 | — | — | — | — | — |
| 2008–09 | Torpedo Nizhny Novgorod | KHL | 27 | 5 | 6 | 11 | 10 | 3 | 0 | 2 | 2 | 0 |
| 2009–10 | Torpedo Nizhny Novgorod | KHL | 55 | 9 | 17 | 26 | 30 | — | — | — | — | — |
| 2010–11 | Torpedo Nizhny Novgorod | KHL | 53 | 6 | 12 | 18 | 18 | — | — | — | — | — |
| 2011–12 | Torpedo Nizhny Novgorod | KHL | 45 | 6 | 15 | 21 | 26 | 13 | 3 | 6 | 9 | 6 |
| 2012–13 | Torpedo Nizhny Novgorod | KHL | 17 | 1 | 5 | 6 | 6 | — | — | — | — | — |
| 2012–13 | Atlant Moscow Oblast | KHL | 7 | 1 | 1 | 2 | 0 | — | — | — | — | — |
| 2013–14 | Avtomobilist Yekaterinburg | KHL | 13 | 0 | 1 | 1 | 0 | — | — | — | — | — |
| 2013–14 | Sputnik Nizhny Tagil | VHL | 5 | 1 | 2 | 3 | 0 | — | — | — | — | — |
| 2013–14 | Amur Khabarovsk | KHL | 13 | 3 | 0 | 3 | 0 | — | — | — | — | — |
| 2014–15 | HC Sochi | KHL | 55 | 16 | 25 | 41 | 45 | 4 | 1 | 0 | 1 | 2 |
| 2015–16 | HC Sochi | KHL | 60 | 13 | 23 | 36 | 29 | 4 | 0 | 0 | 0 | 0 |
| 2016–17 | HC Sochi | KHL | 54 | 12 | 23 | 35 | 18 | — | — | — | — | — |
| 2017–18 | Avtomobilist Yekaterinburg | KHL | 50 | 11 | 21 | 32 | 16 | 5 | 0 | 2 | 2 | 0 |
| 2018–19 | Avtomobilist Yekaterinburg | KHL | 43 | 10 | 11 | 21 | 14 | 4 | 1 | 1 | 2 | 2 |
| 2019–20 | HC Sochi | KHL | 25 | 3 | 6 | 9 | 6 | — | — | — | — | — |
| 2019–20 | Salavat Yulaev Ufa | KHL | 10 | 2 | 3 | 5 | 4 | 5 | 0 | 2 | 2 | 4 |
| 2020–21 | Kunlun Red Star | KHL | 2 | 0 | 0 | 0 | 2 | — | — | — | — | — |
| RSL totals | | | 236 | 45 | 46 | 91 | 165 | 22 | 4 | 3 | 7 | 18 |
| KHL totals | | | 534 | 98 | 170 | 268 | 224 | 38 | 5 | 13 | 18 | 14 |

=== International ===
| Year | Team | Event | GP | G | A | Pts | PIM |
|---|---|---|---|---|---|---|---|
| 2001 | Russia | U18 | 5 | 3 | 1 | 4 | 0 |
| 2002 | Russia | WJC18 | 8 | 3 | 8 | 11 | 6 |
| 2004 | Russia | WJC | 6 | 0 | 2 | 2 | 2 |
| Junior totals | | | 19 | 6 | 11 | 17 | 8 |
