= Ilya Fedotov =

Russian ice hockey player (born 2003)

- Born: March 19, 2003 (age 23) Saratov, Russia
- Height: 6 ft 2 in (188 cm)
- Weight: 176 lb (80 kg; 12 st 8 lb)
- Position: Left wing
- Shoots: Right
- KHL team Former teams: HC Sochi; Torpedo Nizhny Novgorod; Neftekhimik Nizhnekamsk; SKA Saint Petersburg; Salavat Yulaev Ufa; Sibir Novosibirsk
- NHL draft: 43rd overall, 2021; Arizona Coyotes
- Playing career: 2020–present

Ilya Fedotov (born March 19, 2003) is a Russian ice hockey left winger who plays for HC Sochi of the Kontinental Hockey League (KHL). Fedotov was drafted by the Arizona Coyotes in the 2nd round of the 2021 NHL entry draft with the 43rd overall pick in the draft.

== Playing career ==
On 4 July 2024, after his first season under contract with SKA Saint Petersburg in 2023–24, Fedotov was traded to join his fourth KHL club in short succession in HC Sochi in a multi-player trade.

After one season with Sochi, Fedotov was again traded in a transaction with Salavat Yulaev Ufa in exchange for Matvei Babenko and was subsequently signed to a two-year contract on 2 June 2025.

Fedotov after a brief stint with HC Sibir Novosibirsk, was traded back to HC Sochi at the beginning of the 2026-27 season on 27 September 2026.

== Career statistics ==
			Regular season					Playoffs
Season	Team	League	GP	G	A	Pts	PIM	GP	G	A	Pts	PIM
2019–20	Chaika Nizhny Novgorod	MHL	6	0	1	1	2	—	—	—	—	—
2020–21	Chaika Nizhny Novgorod	MHL	54	18	20	38	28	8	3	0	3	0
2020–21	Torpedo Nizhny Novgorod	KHL	2	0	0	0	0	—	—	—	—	—
2021–22	Torpedo Nizhny Novgorod	KHL	35	2	0	2	17	—	—	—	—	—
2021–22	Chaika Nizhny Novgorod	MHL	20	3	12	15	44	10	6	4	10	41
2022–23	Torpedo Nizhny Novgorod	KHL	2	0	0	0	0	—	—	—	—	—
2022–23	Chaika Nizhny Novgorod	MHL	11	6	3	9	8	—	—	—	—	—
2022–23	Neftekhimik Nizhnekamsk	KHL	40	9	5	14	31	—	—	—	—	—
2023–24	SKA Saint Petersburg	KHL	16	0	0	0	10	—	—	—	—	—
2023–24	SKA-Neva	VHL	10	2	7	9	10	9	0	4	4	17
2024–25	HC Sochi	KHL	28	4	6	10	24	—	—	—	—	—
2025–26	Salavat Yulaev Ufa	KHL	14	0	2	2	8	—	—	—	—	—
2025–26	Sibir Novosibirsk	KHL	25	3	4	7	13	3	0	0	0	12
KHL totals			162	18	17	35	92	3	0	0	0	12
