= Atlant Moscow Oblast =

Russian ice hockey team

- City: Mytishchi, Moscow Oblast
- League: Kontinental Hockey League (2008–2015); Russian Superleague (2005–2008)
- Conference: Western
- Division: Tarasov
- Founded: 2005
- Folded: 2015
- Home arena: Mytishchi Arena (capacity: 7,000)
- Colours
- Affiliates: Mytishchinskie Atlanty (MHL)
- Website: www.atlant-mo.ru

Franchise history
- Atlant Moscow Oblast; 2008–2015; Khimik Moscow Oblast; 2005–2008; Khimik Voskresensk; 1953–2005

Hockey Club Atlant Moscow Oblast (Russian: ХК Атлант Московская область, English: Atlas Hockey Club Moscow Region) was a Russian professional ice hockey team based in Mytishchi, Moscow Oblast. They were members of the Bobrov Division of the Kontinental Hockey League in the 2014–15 season, but have not been active since the 2015–16 season due to financial issues.

== History ==
=== Overview ===
Atlant was founded in 2005 when a team (Khimik) based in Voskresensk was relocated to Mytishchi. The old team traced its history back to 1953. Immediate success allowed Khimik to play in the Championship of the Soviet Union. Leading the team was playing-coach Nikolay Epshtein. In three years, Khimik was graduated to the top league of the Soviet Union. Three bronze medal results between 1965 and 1984 were capitulated in 1989 when the team achieved silver under prestigious head coach Vladimir Vasiliyev, a major accomplishment for a team from a small town. Atlant also had a successful homegrown talent has come out of the Khimik system, with names including future Stanley Cup winners such as Igor Larionov and Valeri Kamensky.

In the spring of 1998, the status of the team changed, representing not only the city of Voskresensk but also the entire Moscow Oblast. This event took place on their 45th anniversary. During the 2005–06 season, the team relocated within the Moscow Oblast, from Voskresensk to Mytishchi. Following this, the team changed its name to Atlant, prior to its inclusion in the Kontinental Hockey League (KHL). Their new team logo features a Central Asian Shepherd Dog.

Khimik Moscow Logo 2005–2008

Alabai, secondary team logo used in 2008–2010

Atlant Moscow Oblast Logo 2008–2013

=== Recent history ===
Atlant signed NHL goaltender Ray Emery to a single year contract on July 9, 2008. The deal was reportedly worth in excess of $2 million, plus bonuses.

Atlant and Emery had several issues, including Emery attacking the team trainer and his temporary refusal to return to the team after the KHL break over a contract dispute. Emery was upset that his pay was in rubles that were not inflation protected. He returned to the team shortly after to play the remainder of the season.

== Honors ==
=== Champions ===
(gold) Pajulahti Cup (1): 2007

=== Runners-up ===
(silver) Gagarin Cup (1): 2011

== Season-by-season KHL records ==
Note: GP = Games played, W = Wins, L = Losses, OTW = Overtime/shootout wins, OTL = Overtime/shootout losses, Pts = Points, GF = Goals for, GA = Goals against

Season	GP	W	OTW	L	OTL	Pts	GF	GA	Finish	Top scorer	Playoffs
2008–09	56	35	7	11	3	122	189	111	2nd, Bobrov	Sergei Mozyakin (76 points: 34 G, 42 A; 56 GP)	Lost in Quarterfinals, 1–3 (Metallurg Magnitogorsk)
2009–10	56	24	13	16	3	101	173	137	2nd, Tarasov	Sergei Mozyakin (66 points: 27 G, 39 A; 56 GP)	Lost in Conference Quarterfinals, 1–3 (Lokomotiv Yaroslavl)
2010–11	54	21	11	16	6	91	138	115	2nd, Tarasov	Sergei Mozyakin (61 points: 31 G, 27 A; 34 GP)	Lost in Gagarin Cup Finals, 1–4 (Salavat Yulaev Ufa)
2011–12	54	20	11	19	4	86	130	134	2nd, Tarasov	Nikolay Zherdev (40 points: 16 G, 24 A; 53 GP)	Lost in Conference Semifinals, 2–4 (SKA Saint Petersburg)
2012–13	52	23	4	21	8	73	137	141	4th, Tarasov	Nikolay Zherdev (37 points: 13 G, 24 A; 39 GP)	Lost in Conference Quarterfinals, 1–4 (SKA Saint Petersburg)
2013–14	54	19	8	22	5	78	123	120	4th, Tarasov	Alexander Kadeikin (23 points: 8 G, 15 A; 54 GP)	Did not qualify
2014–15	60	23	4	25	8	85	158	161	4th, Bobrov	Sergei Shmelyov (37 points: 9 G, 28 A; 55 GP)	Did not qualify

== Players ==
=== Notable alumni ===
==== Hall-of-Famers ====
Players

- Igor Larionov, C, 1978–81, inducted 2008

==== Triple Gold Club ====
Players

- Valeri Kamensky, LW, 1982–85, inducted June 10, 1996, Stanley Cup win vs. Florida Panthers
- Igor Larionov, C, 1978–81, inducted June 7, 1997, Stanley Cup win vs. Philadelphia Flyers

==== Scoring Champions ====
- Dmitri Kvartalnov: 1989–90
- Roman Oksiuta: 1991–92
- Sergei Mozyakin: 2007–08, 2008–09, 2009–10

==== First-round draft picks ====
- 2009: Yevgeny Molotilov (11th overall), Stefan Stepanov (20th overall) and Alexander Shevchenko (21st overall)
- 2010: none
- 2011: Arseni Khatsey (9th overall) and Artur Gavrus (18th overall)

==== List of Khimik/Atlant players selected in the NHL entry draft ====
- 1989: Roman Oksiuta (New York Rangers) (202nd overall)
- 1990: Vyacheslav Kozlov (Detroit Red Wings) (45th overall), Valeri Zelepukin (New Jersey Devils) (221st overall), Sergei Selyanin (Winnipeg Jets) (224th overall)
- 1991: Igor Ulanov (Winnipeg Jets) (203rd overall)
- 1992: Alexander Cherbayev (San Jose Sharks) (51st overall), Evgeny Garanin (Winnipeg Jets) (228th overall)
- 1994: Sergei Berezin (Toronto Maple Leafs) (256th overall)
- 1998: Andrei Markov (Montreal Canadiens) (162nd overall), Yevgeny Pastukh St. Louis Blues (225th overall), Andrei Yershov (Chicago Blackhawks) (240th overall)
- 2001: Evgeny Gamalei (New Jersey Devils) (257th overall)
- 2003: Dmitri Chernykh (New Jersey Devils) (48th overall)
