= 1995–96 Colorado Avalanche season =

National Hockey League team season

1995–96 Colorado Avalanche
- Stanley Cup champions
- Western Conference champions
- Pacific Division champions
- Division: 1st Pacific
- Conference: 2nd Western
- 1995–96 record: 47–25–10
- Home record: 24–10–7
- Road record: 23–15–3
- Goals for: 326
- Goals against: 240

Team information
- General manager: Pierre Lacroix
- Coach: Marc Crawford
- Captain: Joe Sakic
- Alternate captains: Mike Ricci; Sylvain Lefebvre
- Arena: McNichols Sports Arena
- Average attendance: 16,017 (99.7%); Total: 656,708
- Minor league affiliate: Cornwall Aces (AHL)

Team leaders
- Goals: Joe Sakic (51)
- Assists: Peter Forsberg (86)
- Points: Joe Sakic (120)
- Penalty minutes: Chris Simon (250)
- Plus/minus: Curtis Leschyshyn (+32)
- Wins: Patrick Roy; Stephane Fiset (22)
- Goals against average: Patrick Roy (2.68)

The 1995–96 Colorado Avalanche season was the first season of the Nordiques/Avalanche franchise after relocating from Quebec City to Denver. As a result, the Avalanche were reassigned to the Pacific Division of the NHL's Western Conference. They would then win the Stanley Cup sweeping the Florida Panthers, being the 2nd team to win the cup after becoming a new team since the Maple Leafs in 1918.

== Regular season ==
The Avalanche played their first game in the McNichols Sports Arena in Denver on October 6, 1995, winning 3–2 against the Detroit Red Wings. With the team led by captain Joe Sakic, forward Peter Forsberg and defenseman Adam Foote on the ice, Pierre Lacroix as the general manager, and Marc Crawford as the head coach.

The season was marked by the trade of Mike Keane and Patrick Roy from the Montreal Canadiens on December 6 for Jocelyn Thibault, Martin Rucinsky, and Andrei Kovalenko. Keane was the former captain of the Canadiens, and Roy was a 6-time NHL All-Star, 4-time William M. Jennings Trophy winner, 3-time Vezina Trophy winner, and two-time Conn Smythe Trophy winner (1986 Stanley Cup Final and 1993 Stanley Cup Final). Roy demanded a trade from the Canadiens after he felt humiliated for being left in a game after surrendering 9 goals during an 11–1 loss against the eventual President Trophy-winning Red Wings on December 9. Roy's acquisition would prove pivotal for the Avalanche: he started 38 games, going 22-15-1 with a .909 save percentage and 2.68 goals against average (GAA); in the playoffs, he started all 22 games, going 16–6 with a .921 save percentage, 2.10 GAA, and three shutouts, including the Stanley Cup-deciding triple overtime Game 4.

== Playoffs ==
=== Quarter-Finals ===
Colorado won their first-round series against the Vancouver Canucks 4 games to 2.

=== Semi-Finals ===
The team advanced to their second-round series against the Chicago Blackhawks. The series was notable for a mini-feud that developed between the Blackhawks' Jeremy Roenick and Roy. During Game 4, which the Blackhawks lost 2–3 in triple overtime, Roenick was tripped during a breakaway. In a media interview after the game, Roecnick said he should have received a penalty shot for being tripped and that Roy would not have been able to stop him, citing Roy's performance in Game 3 (.840 save percentage). Upon hearing this, Roy replied:

I can't really hear what Jeremy says because I got my two Stanley Cup rings plugging my ear.

The Avalanche would go on to win games 5 and 6, eliminating the Blackhawks and advancing to the Western Conference Finals, where they would face the Presidents' Trophy-winning Detroit Red Wings.

=== Western Conference Finals ===
Colorado jumped out to an early series lead, winning the first two games on the road before dropping Game 3 at home. The two teams then alternated wins and losses, with the Red Wings avoiding elimination by winning Game 5 at home.

During the first period of Game 6, with the game tied 1-1, the Avalanche's Claude Lemieux boarded Detroit's Kris Draper; Draper hit his head on the boards, breaking multiple bones in his face. Despite Lemieux receiving a 5-minute major penalty and a 10-minute game misconduct, the Avalanche went on to win the game 4-1 and the series four games to two, advancing to the franchise's first Stanley Cup Final. Lemieux's hit on Draper would serve as the inciting incident of the rivalry between the two teams which would last over ten years.

=== Stanley Cup Final ===
In the Stanley Cup Final, the Avalanche met the Florida Panthers, who were also in their first Stanley Cup Final. The Avalanche swept the series 4–0. In Game Four, during the third overtime and after more than 100 minutes of play with no goals, defenseman Uwe Krupp scored to claim the franchise's first Cup. Joe Sakic was the playoff's scoring leader with 34 points (18 goals and 16 assists) and won the Conn Smythe Trophy, awarded to the most valuable player to his team during the playoffs. The 1996 Stanley Cup was the first major professional championship won by a Denver team. With the Stanley Cup win, Russians Alexei Gusarov and Valeri Kamensky and Swede Peter Forsberg became members of the "Triple Gold Club", the exclusive group of ice hockey players who have won Olympic gold, World Championship gold and the Stanley Cup. The Avalanche were the first NHL team to win a Stanley Cup in their first year after relocating, and the first team to do so since the 1937 Redskins relocated from Boston to Washington, D.C.

== Milestones ==
- December 11, 1995: Patrick Roy earned his first victory in net as a member of the Colorado Avalanche. It was a 5–1 victory over the Toronto Maple Leafs.
- February 5, 1996: Patrick Roy played the Canadiens for the first time since he was traded to the Colorado Avalanche. Roy stopped 37 of 39 shots in a 4–2 win. After the game, Roy took the game puck and flipped it to Canadiens head coach Mario Tremblay.

=== Season standings ===
Pacific Division
No.		GP	W	L	T	GF	GA	Pts
1	**Colorado Avalanche**	82	47	25	10	326	240	104
2	**Calgary Flames**	82	34	37	11	241	240	79
3	**Vancouver Canucks**	82	32	35	15	278	278	79
4	Mighty Ducks of Anaheim	82	35	39	8	234	247	78
5	Edmonton Oilers	82	30	44	8	240	304	68
6	Los Angeles Kings	82	24	40	18	256	302	66
7	San Jose Sharks	82	20	55	7	252	357	47

Note: GP = Games played; W = Wins; L = Losses; T = Ties; GF = Goals for; GA = Goals against; Pts = Points
Bolded teams qualified for the playoffs.

Western Conference
R		Div	GP	W	L	T	GF	GA	Pts
**1**	**p – Detroit Red Wings**	**CEN**	**82**	**62**	**13**	**7**	**325**	**181**	**131**
**2**	**Colorado Avalanche**	**PAC**	**82**	**47**	**25**	**10**	**326**	**240**	**104**
**3**	**Chicago Blackhawks**	**CEN**	**82**	**40**	**28**	**14**	**273**	**220**	**94**
**4**	**Toronto Maple Leafs**	**CEN**	**82**	**34**	**36**	**12**	**247**	**252**	**80**
**5**	**St. Louis Blues**	**CEN**	**82**	**32**	**34**	**16**	**219**	**248**	**80**
**6**	**Calgary Flames**	**PAC**	**82**	**34**	**37**	**11**	**241**	**240**	**79**
**7**	**Vancouver Canucks**	**PAC**	**82**	**32**	**35**	**15**	**278**	**278**	**79**
**8**	**Winnipeg Jets**	**CEN**	**82**	**36**	**40**	**6**	**275**	**291**	**78**
9	Mighty Ducks of Anaheim	PAC	82	35	39	8	234	247	78
10	Edmonton Oilers	PAC	82	30	44	8	240	304	68
11	Dallas Stars	CEN	82	26	42	14	227	280	66
12	Los Angeles Kings	PAC	82	24	40	18	256	302	66
13	San Jose Sharks	PAC	82	20	55	7	252	357	47

Divisions: CEN – Central, PAC – Pacific

bold – Qualified for playoffs; p – Won Presidents' Trophy

== Schedule and results ==
=== Regular season ===
1995–96 regular season
October: 7–3–1 (home: 5–0–1; road: 2–3–0)

Game	Date	Visitor	Score	Home	OT	Decision	Record	Points	Recap
1	October 6	Detroit	2 – 3	Colorado		Fiset	1–0–0	2	W
2	October 7	Colorado	2 – 4	Los Angeles		Fiset	1–1–0	2	L
3	October 9	Pittsburgh	6 – 6	Colorado	OT	Fiset	1–1–1	3	T
4	October 11	Boston	1 – 3	Colorado		Fiset	2–1–1	5	W
5	October 13	Colorado	1 – 3	Washington		Fiset	2–2–1	5	L
6	October 14	Colorado	1 – 4	St. Louis		Thibault	2–3–1	5	L
7	October 18	Washington	2 – 4	Colorado		Fiset	3–3–1	7	W
8	October 23	Anaheim	1 – 3	Colorado		Fiset	4–3–1	9	W
9	October 25	Colorado	3 – 2	Calgary		Fiset	5–3–1	11	W
10	October 27	Buffalo	4 – 5	Colorado		Fiset	6–3–1	13	W
11	October 30	Colorado	6 – 1	Dallas		Thibault	7–3–1	15	W

November: 8–2–3 (home: 3–0–1; road: 5–2–2)

Game	Date	Visitor	Score	Home	OT	Decision	Record	Points	Recap
12	November 1	Calgary	1 – 6	Colorado		Thibault	8–3–1	17	W
13	November 3	Colorado	5 – 2	Winnipeg		Fiset	9–3–1	19	W
14	November 5	Colorado	7 – 3	Chicago		Fiset	10–3–1	21	W
15	November 9	Dallas	1 – 1	Colorado	OT	Thibault	10–3–2	22	T
16	November 11	Colorado	8 – 4	Vancouver		Fiset	11–3–2	24	W
17	November 15	Colorado	3 – 7	Anaheim		Thibault	11–4–2	24	L
18	November 17	Colorado	5 – 3	Calgary		Fiset	12–4–2	26	W
19	November 18	Calgary	2 – 5	Colorado		Fiset	13–4–2	28	W
20	November 20	Colorado	3 – 3	Edmonton	OT	Fiset	13–4–3	29	T
21	November 22	Chicago	2 – 6	Colorado		Fiset	14–4–3	31	W
22	November 25	Colorado	2 – 2	Montreal	OT	Thibault	14–4–4	32	T
23	November 28	Colorado	7 – 3	NY Islanders		Thibault	15–4–4	34	W
24	November 29	Colorado	3 – 4	New Jersey	OT	Thibault	15–5–4	34	L

December: 7–6–1 (home: 3–3–0; road: 4–3–1)

Game	Date	Visitor	Score	Home	OT	Decision	Record	Points	Recap
25	December 1	Colorado	3 – 5	NY Rangers		Thibault	15–6–4	34	L
26	December 3	Dallas	7 – 6	Colorado		Fiset	15–7–4	34	L
27	December 5	San Jose	2 – 12	Colorado		Fiset	16–7–4	36	W
28	December 7	Edmonton	5 – 3	Colorado		Roy	16–8–4	36	L
29	December 9	Colorado	7 – 3	Ottawa		Fiset	17–8–4	38	W
30	December 11	Colorado	5 – 1	Toronto		Roy	18–8–4	40	W
31	December 13	Colorado	3 – 4	Buffalo		Roy	18–9–4	40	L
32	December 15	Colorado	2 – 4	Hartford		Fiset	18–10–4	40	L
33	December 18	Vancouver	4 – 2	Colorado		Roy	18–11–4	40	L
34	December 20	Colorado	4 – 1	Edmonton		Roy	19–11–4	42	W
35	December 22	St. Louis	1 – 2	Colorado		Roy	20–11–4	44	W
36	December 23	Colorado	2 – 2	Los Angeles	OT	Fiset	20–11–5	45	T
37	December 26	Colorado	5 – 1	San Jose		Roy	21–11–5	47	W
38	December 29	Toronto	2 – 3	Colorado		Roy	22–11–5	49	W

January: 4–4–4 (home: 1–1–4; road: 3–3–0)

Game	Date	Visitor	Score	Home	OT	Decision	Record	Points	Recap
39	January 3	New Jersey	1 – 0	Colorado		Roy	22–12–5	49	L
40	January 4	Philadelphia	2 – 2	Colorado	OT	Fiset	22–12–6	50	T
41	January 6	Colorado	2 – 5	Toronto		Roy	22–13–6	50	L
42	January 9	Colorado	3 – 0	Boston		Fiset	23–13–6	52	W
43	January 10	Florida	4 – 4	Colorado	OT	Roy	23–13–7	53	T
44	January 14	Calgary	4 – 4	Colorado	OT	Fiset	23–13–8	54	T
45	January 16	Colorado	5 – 2	Pittsburgh		Roy	24–13–8	56	W
46	January 17	Colorado	2 – 3	Detroit		Roy	24–14–8	56	L
47	January 22	NY Islanders	3 – 4	Colorado		Roy	25–14–8	58	W
48	January 25	Vancouver	2 – 2	Colorado	OT	Fiset	25–14–9	59	T
49	January 27	Colorado	4 – 3	San Jose	OT	Roy	26–14–9	61	W
50	January 31	Colorado	1 – 2	Anaheim		Roy	26–15–9	61	L

February: 9–3–1 (home: 7–1–1; road: 2–2–0)

Game	Date	Visitor	Score	Home	OT	Decision	Record	Points	Recap
51	February 1	Winnipeg	4 – 6	Colorado		Fiset	27–15–9	63	W
52	February 3	NY Rangers	1 – 7	Colorado		Roy	28–15–9	65	W
53	February 5	Montreal	2 – 4	Colorado		Roy	29–15–9	67	W
54	February 7	Tampa Bay	4 – 4	Colorado	OT	Fiset	29–15–10	68	T
55	February 9	Hartford	3 – 2	Colorado	OT	Roy	29–16–10	68	L
56	February 11	Colorado	5 – 3	Philadelphia		Fiset	30–16–10	70	W
57	February 15	Colorado	2 – 4	Tampa Bay		Roy	30–17–10	70	L
58	February 16	Colorado	5 – 4	Florida	OT	Fiset	31–17–10	72	W
59	February 19	Edmonton	5 – 7	Colorado		Roy	32–17–10	74	W
60	February 23	Los Angeles	2 – 6	Colorado		Fiset	33–17–10	76	W
61	February 25	Ottawa	2 – 4	Colorado		Roy	34–17–10	78	W
62	February 26	Anaheim	2 – 3	Colorado		Roy	35–17–10	80	W
63	February 29	Colorado	3 – 4	Chicago		Roy	35–18–10	80	L

March: 8–5–0 (home: 3–3–0; road: 5–2–0)

Game	Date	Visitor	Score	Home	OT	Decision	Record	Points	Recap
64	March 1	Chicago	3 – 5	Colorado		Roy	36–18–10	82	W
65	March 3	Toronto	0 – 4	Colorado		Roy	37–18–10	84	W
66	March 5	San Jose	5 – 3	Colorado		Fiset	37–19–10	84	L
67	March 8	Detroit	4 – 2	Colorado		Roy	37–20–10	84	L
68	March 9	Colorado	7 – 5	Vancouver		Fiset	38–20–10	86	W
69	March 13	Colorado	0 – 4	Anaheim		Roy	38–21–10	86	L
70	March 17	Edmonton	1 – 8	Colorado		Roy	39–21–10	88	W
71	March 19	Colorado	4 – 3	Vancouver		Roy	40–21–10	90	W
72	March 20	Colorado	5 – 2	Los Angeles		Fiset	41–21–10	92	W
73	March 22	Colorado	0 – 7	Detroit		Roy	41–22–10	92	L
74	March 24	Colorado	5 – 2	Winnipeg		Roy	42–22–10	94	W
75	March 27	Winnipeg	3 – 1	Colorado		Fiset	42–23–10	94	L
76	March 28	Colorado	8 – 3	San Jose		Roy	43–23–10	96	W

April: 4–2–0 (home: 2–2–0; road: 2–0–0)

Game	Date	Visitor	Score	Home	OT	Decision	Record	Points	Recap
77	April 3	St. Louis	6 – 3	Colorado		Roy	43–24–10	96	L
78	April 6	San Jose	1 – 5	Colorado		Roy	44–24–10	98	W
79	April 7	Colorado	4 – 1	Dallas		Roy	45–24–10	100	W
80	April 10	Anaheim	3 – 7	Colorado		Roy	46–24–10	102	W
81	April 11	Colorado	3 – 2	St. Louis		Fiset	47–24–10	104	W
82	April 14	Los Angeles	5 – 4	Colorado	OT	Roy	47–25–10	104	L

Legend: W Win (2 points) L Loss (0 points) T Tie (1 point)

=== Playoffs ===
1996 Stanley Cup playoffs
Western Conference Quarterfinals vs. (7) Vancouver Canucks – Avalanche win 4–2

Game	Date	Visitor	Score	Home	OT	Attendance	Decision	Series	Recap
1	April 16	Vancouver	2 – 5	Colorado		16,061	Roy	1 – 0	W
2	April 18	Vancouver	5 – 4	Colorado		16,061	Roy	1 – 1	L
3	April 20	Colorado	4 – 0	Vancouver		18,422	Roy	2 – 1	W
4	April 22	Colorado	3 – 4	Vancouver		18,422	Roy	2 – 2	L
5	April 25	Vancouver	4 – 5	Colorado	OT	16,061	Roy	3 – 2	W
6	April 27	Colorado	3 – 2	Vancouver		18,422	Roy	4 – 2	W

Western Conference Semifinals vs. (3) Chicago Blackhawks – Avalanche win 4–2

Game	Date	Visitor	Score	Home	OT	Attendance	Decision	Series	Recap
1	May 2	Chicago	3 – 2	Colorado	OT	16,061	Roy	0 – 1	L
2	May 4	Chicago	1 – 5	Colorado		16,061	Roy	1 – 1	W
3	May 6	Colorado	3 – 4	Chicago	OT	20,797	Roy	1 – 2	L
4	May 8	Colorado	3 – 2	Chicago	3OT	22,454	Roy	2 – 2	W
5	May 11	Chicago	1 – 4	Colorado		16,061	Roy	3 – 2	W
6	May 13	Colorado	4 – 3	Chicago	2OT	21,356	Roy	4 – 2	W

Western Conference Finals vs. (1) Detroit Red Wings – Avalanche win 4–2

Game	Date	Visitor	Score	Home	OT	Attendance	Decision	Series	Recap
1	May 19	Colorado	3 – 2	Detroit	OT	19,957	Roy	1 – 0	W
2	May 21	Colorado	3 – 0	Detroit		19,983	Roy	2 – 0	W
3	May 23	Detroit	6 – 4	Colorado		16,061	Roy	2 – 1	L
4	May 25	Detroit	2 – 4	Colorado		16,061	Roy	3 – 1	W
5	May 27	Colorado	2 – 5	Detroit		19,983	Roy	3 – 2	L
6	May 29	Detroit	1 – 4	Colorado		16,061	Roy	4 – 2	W

Stanley Cup Finals vs. (E4) Florida Panthers – Avalanche win 4–0

Game	Date	Visitor	Score	Home	OT	Attendance	Decision	Series	Recap
1	June 4	Florida	1 – 3	Colorado		16,061	Roy	1 – 0	W
2	June 6	Florida	1 – 8	Colorado		16,061	Roy	2 – 0	W
3	June 8	Colorado	3 – 2	Florida		14,703	Roy	3 – 0	W
4	June 10	Colorado	1 – 0	Florida	3OT	14,703	Roy	4 – 0	W

Legend: W Win L Loss

== Player statistics ==
=== Scoring ===
- Position abbreviations: C = Center; D = Defense; G = Goaltender; LW = Left wing; RW = Right wing
- † = Joined team via a transaction (e.g., trade, waivers, signing) during the season. Stats reflect time with the Avalanche only.
- ‡ = Left team via a transaction (e.g., trade, waivers, release) during the season. Stats reflect time with the Avalanche only.

No.	Player	Pos	Regular season						Playoffs					
No.	Player	Pos	GP	G	A	Pts	+/-	PIM	GP	G	A	Pts	+/-	PIM
19	Joe Sakic	C	82	51	69	120	14	44	22	18	16	34	10	14
21	Peter Forsberg	C	82	30	86	116	26	47	22	10	11	21	10	18
13	Valeri Kamensky	LW	81	38	47	85	14	85	22	10	12	22	11	28
22	Claude Lemieux	RW	79	39	32	71	14	117	19	5	7	12	5	55
48	Scott Young	RW	81	21	39	60	2	50	22	3	12	15	6	10
8	Sandis Ozolinsh†	D	66	13	37	50	0	50	22	5	14	19	5	16
18	Adam Deadmarsh	RW	78	21	27	48	20	142	22	5	12	17	8	25
12	Chris Simon	LW	64	16	18	34	10	250	12	1	2	3	−2	11
26	Stephane Yelle	LW	71	13	14	27	15	30	22	1	4	5	2	8
6	Craig Wolanin	D	75	7	20	27	25	50	7	1	0	1	2	8
9	Mike Ricci	C	62	6	21	27	1	52	22	6	11	17	−1	18
51	Andrei Kovalenko‡	LW	26	11	11	22	11	16	—	—	—	—	—	—
10	Troy Murray	C	63	7	14	21	15	22	8	0	0	0	−4	19
25	Mike Keane†	RW	55	10	10	20	1	40	22	3	2	5	1	16
5	Alexei Gusarov	D	65	5	15	20	29	56	21	0	9	9	13	12
7	Curtis Leschyshyn	D	77	4	15	19	32	73	17	1	2	3	4	8
52	Adam Foote	D	73	5	11	16	27	88	22	1	3	4	11	36
2	Sylvain Lefebvre	D	75	5	11	16	26	49	22	0	5	5	6	12
25	Martin Rucinsky‡	LW	22	4	11	15	10	14	—	—	—	—	—	—
24	Jon Klemm	D	56	3	12	15	12	20	15	2	1	3	6	0
20	Rene Corbet	LW	33	3	6	9	10	33	8	3	2	5	3	2
16	Warren Rychel	LW	52	6	2	8	6	147	12	1	0	1	4	23
11	Owen Nolan‡	RW	9	4	4	8	−3	9	—	—	—	—	—	—
4	Uwe Krupp	D	6	0	3	3	4	4	22	4	12	16	5	33
27	John Slaney‡	D	7	0	3	3	2	4	—	—	—	—	—	—
38	Paul Brousseau	RW	8	1	1	2	1	2	—	—	—	—	—	—
14	Dave Hannan†	LW	4	1	0	1	1	2	13	0	2	2	3	2
23	Janne Laukkanen‡	D	3	1	0	1	−1	0	—	—	—	—	—	—
14	Landon Wilson	RW	7	1	0	1	3	6	—	—	—	—	—	—
35	Stephane Fiset	G	37	0	1	1		2	1	0	0	0		0
15	Josef Marha	C	2	0	1	1	1	0	—	—	—	—	—	—
55	Anders Myrvold	D	4	0	1	1	−2	6	—	—	—	—	—	—
47	Claude Lapointe‡	C	3	0	0	0	−1	0	—	—	—	—	—	—
31	Aaron Miller	D	5	0	0	0	0	0	—	—	—	—	—	—
33	Patrick Roy†	G	39	0	0	0		4	22	0	0	0		0
41	Jocelyn Thibault‡	G	10	0	0	0		0	—	—	—	—	—	—

=== Goaltending ===
- † = Joined team via a transaction (e.g., trade, waivers, signing) during the season. Stats reflect time with the Avalanche only.
- ‡ = Left team via a transaction (e.g., trade, waivers, release) during the season. Stats reflect time with the Avalanche only.

No.	Player	Regular season											Playoffs									
No.	Player	GP	GS	W	L	T	SA	GA	GAA	SV%	SO	TOI	GP	GS	W	L	SA	GA	GAA	SV%	SO	TOI
35	Stephane Fiset	37	35	22	6	7	1,012	103	2.93	.898	1	2,106:38	1	0	0	0	0	0	0.00		0	0:40
33	Patrick Roy†	39	38	22	15	1	1,130	103	2.68	.909	1	2,305:15	22	22	16	6	649	51	2.10	.921	3	1,453:53
41	Jocelyn Thibault‡	10	9	3	4	2	222	28	3.01	.874	0	558:22	—	—	—	—	—	—	—	—	—	—

== Awards and records ==
=== Awards ===
Type	Award/honor	Recipient	Ref
League (annual)	Conn Smythe Trophy	Joe Sakic	
League (in-season)	NHL All-Star Game selection	Marc Crawford (coach)	
League (in-season)	NHL All-Star Game selection	Peter Forsberg	
League (in-season)	NHL All-Star Game selection	Joe Sakic	

=== Milestones ===
Milestone	Player	Date	Ref
First game	Anders Myrvold	October 6, 1995	
First game	Stephane Yelle	October 6, 1995	
First game	Landon Wilson	November 29, 1995	
First game	Paul Brousseau	January 10, 1996	
First game	Josef Marha	March 17, 1996	

== Transactions ==
=== Trades ===
July 7, 1995	To Calgary Flames David Ling; 9th round pick in 1995	To Colorado Avalanche 9th round pick in 1995
July 12, 1995	To Washington Capitals 3rd round pick in 1996	To Colorado Avalanche John Slaney
July 12, 1995	To Philadelphia Flyers Garth Snow	To Colorado Avalanche 3rd and 6th round picks in 1996
October 2, 1995	To Washington Capitals Cash	To Colorado Avalanche Warren Rychel
October 3, 1995	To New York Islanders Wendel Clark	To Colorado Avalanche Claude Lemieux
October 5, 1995	To Tampa Bay Lightning Steven Finn	To Colorado Avalanche 4th round pick in 1997
October 26, 1995	To San Jose Sharks Owen Nolan	To Colorado Avalanche Sandis Ozolinsh
November 1, 1995	To Calgary Flames Claude Lapointe	To Colorado Avalanche 7th round pick in 1996
December 6, 1995	To Montreal Canadiens Andrei Kovalenko; Jocelyn Thibault; Martin Rucinsky	To Colorado Avalanche Patrick Roy; Mike Keane
December 28, 1995	To Los Angeles Kings John Slaney	To Colorado Avalanche Conditional draft pick in 1996
January 26, 1996	To Ottawa Senators Janne Laukkanen	To Colorado Avalanche Brad Larsen
March 19, 1996	To Calgary Flames Paxton Schulte	To Colorado Avalanche Vesa Viitakoski
March 20, 1996	To Buffalo Sabres 6th round pick in 1996	To Colorado Avalanche Dave Hannan
April 3, 1996	To Washington Capitals Anson Carter	To Colorado Avalanche 4th round pick in 1996

=== Other transactions ===
Date	Player	Transaction
August 8, 1995	Troy Murray	Signed as a free agent
September 8, 1995	Andrei Kovalenko	Signed as a free agent
September 8, 1995	Curtis Leschyshyn	Signed as a free agent
September 9, 1995	Scott Young	Signed as a free agent
October 2, 1995	Ted Drury	Claimed by Ottawa in the waiver draft
October 2, 1995	Bill Huard	Claimed by Dallas in the waiver draft

== Draft picks ==
Colorado's picks at the 1995 NHL entry draft in Edmonton, Alberta, Canada.

Round	#	Player	Position	Nationality	College/junior/club team (league)
1	25	Marc Denis	G	Canada	Chicoutimi Saguenéens (QMJHL)
2	51	Nic Beaudoin	LW	Canada	Detroit Jr. Red Wings (OHL)
3	77	John Tripp	RW	Canada	Oshawa Generals (OHL)
4^{1}	81	Tomi Kallio	RW	Finland	Kiekko-67 Turku (FinD1)
5	129	Brent Johnson	G	United States	Owen Sound Platers (OHL).
6	155	John Cirjak	RW	Canada	Spokane Chiefs (WHL)
7	181	Dan Smith	D	Canada	University of British Columbia (CIAU)
8	207	Tomi Hirvonen	C	Finland	Ilves Jrs. (Finland)
9^{2}	228	Chris George	RW	Canada	Sarnia Sting (OHL)

Notes

1. The Avalanche acquired this pick as the result of a trade on February 20, 1994 that sent John Tanner to Anaheim in exchange for this pick.
2. The Avalanche acquired this pick as the result of a trade on July 7, 1995 that sent David Ling and a ninth-round pick in 1995 (233rd overall) to Calgary in exchange for this pick.
- The Avalanche fourth-round pick went to the Ottawa Senators as the result of a trade on April 7, 1995 that sent Bill Huard to Quebec in exchange for the rights to Mika Stromberg and this pick (103rd overall).
- The Avalanche ninth-round pick went to the Calgary Flames as the result of a trade on July 7, 1995 that sent a ninth-round pick in 1995 (228rd overall) to Quebec in exchange for David Ling and this pick (233rd overall).

== See also ==
- 1995–96 NHL season
