= Jean Martineau =

Jean Martineau may refer to:

- Jean Martineau (lawyer), Canadian lawyer, judge and president of the Canada Council for the Arts
- Jean Martineau (ice hockey), ice hockey executive
- Jean Colbert Martineau, radio broadcaster
