= 1996 Stanley Cup Final =

1996 ice hockey championship series

	1	2	3	4	Total
Florida Panthers	1	1	2	0***	0
Colorado Avalanche	3	8	3	1***	4
- * – Denotes overtime period(s)
- Location(s): Denver: McNichols Sports Arena (1, 2); Miami: Miami Arena (3, 4)
- Coaches: Florida: Doug MacLean; Colorado: Marc Crawford
- Captains: Florida: Brian Skrudland; Colorado: Joe Sakic
- National anthems: Florida: Jim Salestrom; Colorado: Aaron Bergell
- Referees: Bill McCreary (1, 4); Don Koharski (2); Andy Van Hellemond (3)
- Dates: June 4–10, 1996
- MVP: Joe Sakic (Avalanche)
- Series-winning goal: Uwe Krupp (4:31, third OT)
- Hall of Famers: Avalanche: Peter Forsberg (2014); Patrick Roy (2006); Joe Sakic (2012); Officials: Bill McCreary (2014); Ray Scapinello (2008); Andy Van Hellemond (1999)
- Networks: Canada: (English): CBC (French): SRC; United States: (English): Fox (1, 3), ESPN (2, 4)
- Announcers: (CBC) Bob Cole and Harry Neale (SRC) Claude Quenneville and Gilles Tremblay (Fox) Mike Emrick and John Davidson (ESPN) Gary Thorne and Bill Clement

The 1996 Stanley Cup Final was the championship series of the National Hockey League's (NHL) 1995–96 season, and the culmination of the 1996 Stanley Cup playoffs. It was contested by the Western Conference champion Colorado Avalanche and the Eastern Conference champion Florida Panthers, two teams in the Finals for the first time. The Avalanche swept the Panthers to win their first Stanley Cup in franchise history, becoming the seventh post-1967 expansion team and the second former WHA team (after the Edmonton Oilers) to win the Cup. Colorado's Joe Sakic earned the Conn Smythe Trophy as MVP of the 1996 Playoffs. This was the first major professional sports championship ever won by a Denver-based team.

It was Colorado's first appearance in the Finals, in only their first season in Denver since moving from Quebec City (where they had formerly played as the Nordiques) in 1995. It was also Florida's first appearance in the Finals, in only the franchise's third season since entering the NHL in 1993. Only four other teams have made their first Stanley Cup Final appearance faster: the Toronto Arenas winning the Stanley Cup in the NHL inaugural season in 1917–18, the St. Louis Blues in their debut season in 1967–68 (they lost the 1968 Finals to the Montreal Canadiens), the Vegas Golden Knights in their inaugural year in 2017–18, and the 1928 Cup-winning New York Rangers (who were in their second season of play, having been formed for the 1926–27 season). This was also the first time since the formation of the NHL in 1917 that the two teams competing for the Cup were making their first Finals appearance.

== Paths to the Finals ==
=== Colorado Avalanche ===
Colorado defeated the Vancouver Canucks, Chicago Blackhawks, and Detroit Red Wings in six games each to advance to the Finals.

=== Florida Panthers ===
Florida defeated the Boston Bruins in five games, the Philadelphia Flyers in six, and the Pittsburgh Penguins in seven, becoming the first team from a Southern state to appear in the Stanley Cup Final.

== Game summaries ==
=== Game one ===
June 4	Florida Panthers	1–3	Colorado Avalanche	McNichols Sports Arena	Recap

The series opened on June 4, at the McNichols Sports Arena in Denver. Patrick Roy was in goal for Colorado, and John Vanbiesbrouck was between the pipes for Florida (a rematch from the 1986 Wales Conference Finals when Roy was with the Montreal Canadiens and Vanbiesbrouck was with the New York Rangers). Although Colorado was the heavy favorite in the series, Florida got on the board first on Tom Fitzgerald's goal at 16:51 of the first period. That would be all the Panthers would get, however, as Colorado scored three times within five minutes in the second period. Scott Young scored at 10:32, Mike Ricci scored at 12:21, and Uwe Krupp scored at 14:21. The Avalanche went on to win the game 3–1, with Roy making 25 saves in the victory.

Scoring summary
Period	Team	Goal	Assist(s)	Time	Score
1st	FLA	Tom Fitzgerald (4)	Bill Lindsay (5)	16:51	1–0 FLA
2nd	COL	Scott Young (3)	Adam Deadmarsh (9) and Sylvain Lefebvre (5)	10:32	1–1
2nd	COL	Mike Ricci (6)	Sandis Ozolinsh (13) and Mike Keane (2)	12:21	2–1 COL
2nd	COL	Uwe Krupp (3)	Valeri Kamensky (11) and Peter Forsberg (10)	14:21	3–1 COL
3rd	None				
Penalty summary
Period	Team	Player	Penalty	Time	PIM
1st	FLA	Scott Mellanby	Roughing	09:12	2:00
1st	FLA	Brian Skrudland	Roughing	09:21	2:00
1st	COL	Uwe Krupp	High-sticking	13:46	2:00
1st	COL	Alexei Gusarov	Holding	18:15	2:00
2nd	FLA	Robert Svehla	Interference	00:41	2:00
2nd	FLA	Bill Lindsay	Roughing	07:56	2:00
2nd	COL	Mike Ricci	Roughing	15:31	2:00
2nd	FLA	Robert Svehla	Roughing	17:39	2:00
2nd	COL	Mike Ricci	Goaltender interference	18:30	2:00
3rd	COL	Joe Sakic	Holding	03:35	2:00
3rd	FLA	Terry Carkner	Slashing	07:51	2:00
3rd	FLA	John Vanbiesbrouck (served by Ray Sheppard)	Slashing	09:55	2:00
3rd	FLA	Ed Jovanovski	Roughing	19:42	2:00

Shots by period
Team	1	2	3	Total
FLA	12	6	8	26
COL	6	15	9	30

=== Game two ===
June 6	Florida Panthers	1–8	Colorado Avalanche	McNichols Sports Arena	Recap

Peter Forsberg got the Avalanche on the board first in game two, scoring an unassisted goal at 4:11 of the first period. The Panthers tied the game on Stu Barnes' power-play goal at 7:52. Rene Corbet broke the 1–1 tie with a power-play goal at 10:43, and then Forsberg scored two power-play goals of his own at 13:46 and 15:05 to complete the hat trick. Colorado led 4–1 after just one period. After John Vanbiesbrouck had allowed 4 goals on 11 shots in the first, backup goaltender Mark Fitzpatrick would replace him to start the second period for Florida. The Avalanche would make it 5–1 with Corbet's second goal of the game at 4:37 of the second period. Valeri Kamensky followed with a goal just 31 seconds later, and Jon Klemm scored at 10:03 to give Colorado a dominating 7–1 lead after two periods. Klemm would add another goal at 17:28 of the third period. It was the Avalanche's fourth power-play goal of the game. With 10:21 remaining in the game, Colorado forward Warren Rychel engaged in a fight with Florida defenseman Ed Jovanovski. As a result, Rychel was given a minor penalty for instigator and was ejected from the game. Colorado won the game 8–1, with three players scoring at least twice.

Scoring summary
Period	Team	Goal	Assist(s)	Time	Score
1st	COL	Peter Forsberg (8)	Unassisted	04:11	1–0 COL
1st	FLA	Stu Barnes (6) – pp	Dave Lowry (7) and Ed Jovanovski (7)	07:52	1–1
1st	COL	Rene Corbet (2) – pp	Scott Young (12) and Joe Sakic (13)	10:43	2–1 COL
1st	COL	Peter Forsberg (9) – pp	Joe Sakic (14) and Sandis Ozolinsh (14)	13:46	3–1 COL
1st	COL	Peter Forsberg (10) – pp	Joe Sakic (15) and Adam Deadmarsh (10)	15:05	4–1 COL
2nd	COL	Rene Corbet (3)	Unassisted	04:37	5–1 COL
2nd	COL	Valeri Kamensky (10)	Alexei Gusarov (8) and Adam Deadmarsh (11)	05:08	6–1 COL
2nd	COL	Jon Klemm (1)	Rene Corbet (2) and Uwe Krupp (12)	10:03	7–1 COL
3rd	COL	Jon Klemm (2) – pp	Joe Sakic (16)	17:28	8–1 COL
Penalty summary
Period	Team	Player	Penalty	Time	PIM
1st	COL	Adam Deadmarsh	Roughing	05:53	2:00
1st	FLA	Bill Lindsay	Slashing	08:55	2:00
1st	FLA	Terry Carkner	Roughing	12:51	2:00
1st	FLA	John Vanbiesbrouck	Interference	14:50	2:00
2nd	COL	Sylvain Lefebvre	Holding	06:26	2:00
2nd	COL	Warren Rychel	Roughing	17:01	2:00
3rd	COL	Valeri Kamensky	High-sticking – double minor	03:11	4:00
3rd	COL	Curtis Leschyshyn	Charging	07:28	2:00
3rd	COL	Valeri Kamensky	Roughing	07:28	2:00
3rd	FLA	Ed Jovanovski	Roughing	07:28	2:00
3rd	COL	Warren Rychel	Instigator	09:39	2:00
3rd	COL	Warren Rychel	Fighting – major	09:39	5:00
3rd	COL	Warren Rychel	Game misconduct	09:39	10:00
3rd	FLA	Ed Jovanovski	Fighting – major	09:39	5:00
3rd	FLA	Paul Laus	Goaltender interference	11:42	2:00
3rd	FLA	Scott Mellanby	Roughing	16:09	2:00

Shots by period
Team	1	2	3	Total
FLA	8	15	5	28
COL	11	12	7	30

=== Game three ===
June 8	Colorado Avalanche	3–2	Florida Panthers	Miami Arena	Recap

The Avalanche went to the Miami Arena in Florida with a 2–0 series lead. Claude Lemieux, back after his two-game suspension, scored the first goal of the game at 2:44 of the first period to give Colorado a 1–0 lead. Florida played determinedly, however, and tied the game on Ray Sheppard's power-play goal at 9:14. Rob Niedermayer scored at 11:19 to give the Panthers their second lead of the series. The score was 2–1 Florida after one period. At 1:38 of the second period, Colorado's Mike Keane scored a game-tying goal. Captain Joe Sakic scored the go-ahead goal just 82 seconds later, and Colorado went on to win 3–2 and take a commanding three-games-to-none lead in the series. Patrick Roy made 32 saves in the win.

Scoring summary
Period	Team	Goal	Assist(s)	Time	Score
1st	COL	Claude Lemieux (5)	Valeri Kamensky (12) and Peter Forsberg (11)	02:44	1–0 COL
1st	FLA	Ray Sheppard (8) – pp	Martin Straka (2) and Ed Jovanovski (8)	09:14	1–1
1st	FLA	Rob Niedermayer (5)	Scott Mellanby (6) and Johan Garpenlov (2)	11:19	2–1 FLA
2nd	COL	Mike Keane (3)	Adam Foote (3) and Alexei Gusarov (9)	01:38	2–2
2nd	COL	Joe Sakic (18)	Adam Deadmarsh (12) and Curtis Leschyshyn (2)	03:00	3–2 COL
3rd	None				
Penalty summary
Period	Team	Player	Penalty	Time	PIM
1st	COL	Adam Deadmarsh	Hooking	07:40	2:00
1st	COL	Adam Foote	Roughing	12:49	2:00
1st	FLA	Dave Lowry	Roughing	12:49	2:00
2nd	None				
3rd	None				

Shots by period
Team	1	2	3	Total
COL	6	10	6	22
FLA	16	13	5	34

=== Game four ===
June 10	Colorado Avalanche	1–0	3OT	Florida Panthers	Miami Arena	Recap

With their backs to the wall, the two teams combined for a defensive battle that set a new record for the longest scoreless tie (104:31) in a Stanley Cup Final game, breaking the previous record from Game 4 of the 1934 Stanley Cup Final (which ended after 90:05 of overtime); this record would be passed by Game 5 of the 2000 Stanley Cup Final.

Florida goaltender John Vanbiesbrouck went save for save with Colorado goaltender Patrick Roy. The two teams played a marathon game that took until the third overtime period. Uwe Krupp's unassisted goal at 4:31 ended 44 minutes and 31 seconds of overtime and gave the Avalanche a 1–0 win and a four-game series sweep. Goaltender Patrick Roy stopped all 63 shots he faced. Colorado outscored Florida 15–4 in the series, and Patrick Roy stopped 147 of 151 shots, for a save percentage of .974. Joe Sakic was awarded the Conn Smythe Trophy as playoff MVP, having led all skaters in goals with 18, and points with 34. For both Patrick Roy and Claude Lemieux, it was one of their three Stanley Cup wins in 11 years. Roy and Lemieux first won the Cup in 1986 with the Montreal Canadiens. Roy won a second Cup with Montreal in 1993. Lemieux won a second cup with New Jersey in 1995.

The Avalanche became the third team to win the cup after relocating: the 1989 Calgary Flames won the Cup after moving from Atlanta and the New Jersey Devils in 1995 won the Cup 13 years after they played their last game in the same city and same arena that the Avs played in as the Colorado Rockies.

Scoring summary
Period	Team	Goal	Assist(s)	Time	Score
1st	None				
2nd	None				
3rd	None				
OT	None				
2OT	None				
3OT	COL	Uwe Krupp (4)	Unassisted	04:31	1–0 COL
Penalty summary
Period	Team	Player	Penalty	Time	PIM
1st	FLA	Robert Svehla	Roughing	18:51	2:00
2nd	COL	Valeri Kamensky	Hooking	05:21	2:00
2nd	COL	Sandis Ozolinsh	Roughing	05:21	2:00
2nd	FLA	Rob Niedermayer	Roughing	05:21	2:00
2nd	COL	Adam Foote	Roughing	09:28	2:00
2nd	FLA	Ed Jovanovski	Cross-checking	12:27	2:00
2nd	COL	Curtis Leschyshyn	Hooking	15:33	2:00
2nd	COL	Mike Ricci	Roughing	18:05	2:00
2nd	FLA	Stu Barnes	Roughing	18:05	2:00
3rd	FLA	John Vanbiesbrouck	Interference	05:15	2:00
3rd	COL	Claude Lemieux	High-sticking	06:29	2:00
OT	COL	Sandis Ozolinsh	Roughing	13:04	2:00
OT	FLA	Johan Garpenlov	Roughing	13:04	2:00
2OT	COL	Claude Lemieux	Roughing	09:57	2:00
2OT	FLA	Brian Skrudland	Slashing	09:57	2:00
3OT	None				

Shots by period
Team	1	2	3	OT	2OT	3OT	Total
COL	9	10	10	11	12	4	56
FLA	10	17	8	7	18	3	63

== Team rosters ==
Bolded years under Finals appearance indicates year won Stanley Cup.

=== Colorado Avalanche ===
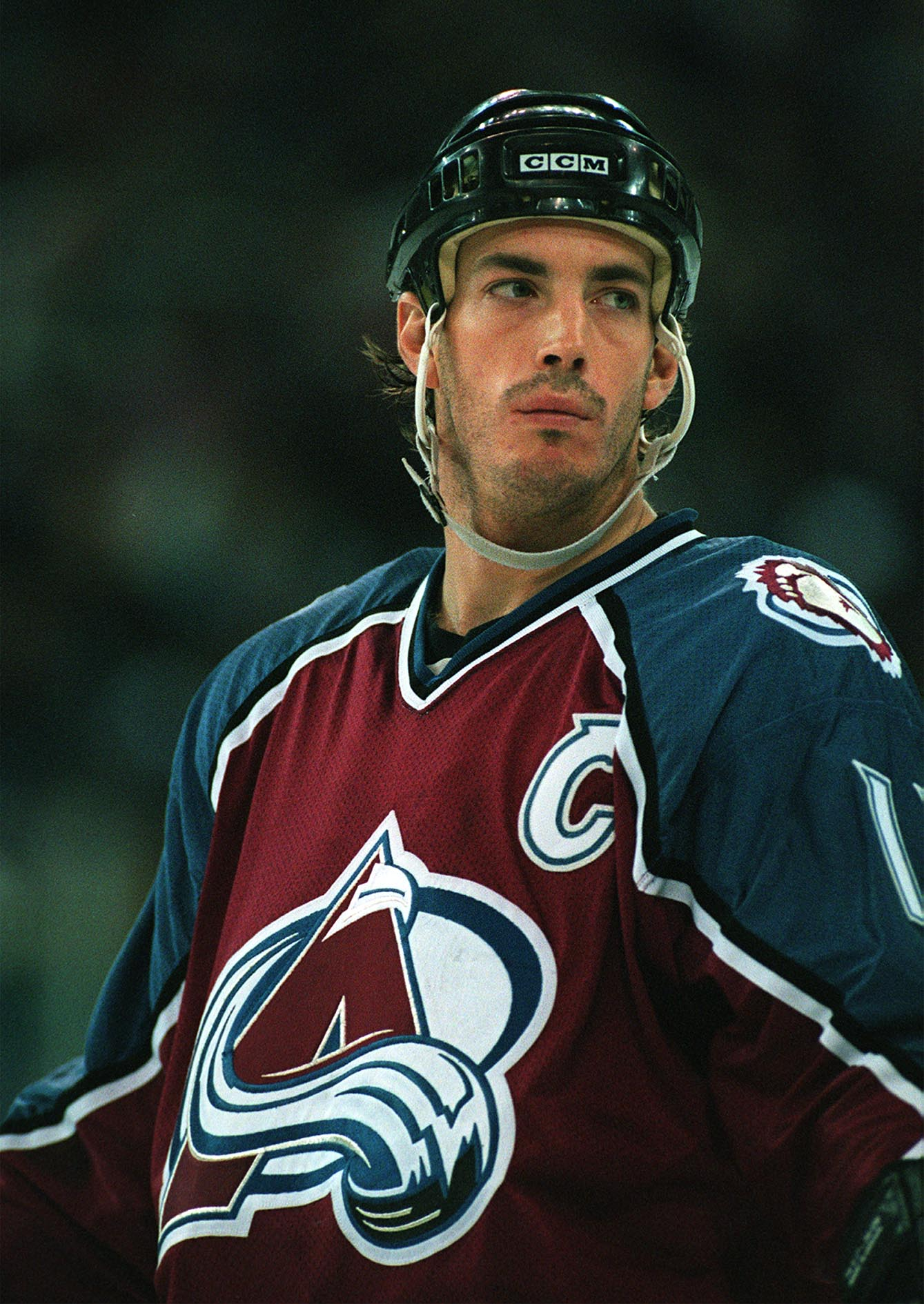
Joe Sakic captained the Avalanche to their first Stanley Cup Final appearance in franchise history.

#	Nat	Player	Position	Hand	Acquired	Place of birth	Finals appearance
35	(Canada)	Stephane Fiset	G	L	1988	Montreal, Quebec	first
33	(Canada)	Patrick Roy	G	L	1995–96	Quebec City, Quebec	fourth (**1986**, 1989, **1993**)
2	(Canada)	Sylvain Lefebvre – **A**	D	L	1994–95	Richmond, Quebec	first
4	(Germany)	Uwe Krupp	D	R	1994–95	Cologne, West Germany	first
5	(Russia)	Alexei Gusarov	D	L	1988	Leningrad, Soviet Union	first
6	(United States)	Craig Wolanin – **A**	D	L	1989–90	Grosse Pointe, Michigan	first (did not play)
7	(Canada)	Curtis Leschyshyn – **A**	D	L	1988	Thompson, Manitoba	first
8	(Latvia)	Sandis Ozolinsh	D	L	1995–96	Riga, Soviet Union	first
24	(Canada)	Jon Klemm	D	R	1991–92	Cranbrook, British Columbia	first
52	(Canada)	Adam Foote	D	R	1988	Toronto, Ontario	first
9	(Canada)	Mike Ricci – **A**	C	L	1991–92	Scarborough, Ontario	first
10	(Canada)	Troy Murray	C	R	1995–96	Calgary, Alberta	first (did not play)
12	(Canada)	Chris Simon	LW	L	1992–93	Wawa, Ontario	first (did not play)
13	(Russia)	Valeri Kamensky	LW	R	1988	Voskresensk, Soviet Union	first
14	(Canada)	Dave Hannan	C/LW	L	1995–96	Onaping Falls, Ontario	second (**1988**)
16	(Canada)	Warren Rychel	LW	L	1995–96	Strathroy, Ontario	second (1993)
18	(United States)	Adam Deadmarsh	RW	R	1993	Trail, British Columbia	first
19	(Canada)	Joe Sakic – **C**	C	L	1987	Burnaby, British Columbia	first
20	(Canada)	Rene Corbet	LW	R	1991	Victoriaville, Quebec	first
21	(Sweden)	Peter Forsberg	C/LW	L	1994–95	Örnsköldsvik, Sweden	first
22	(Canada)	Claude Lemieux	RW	R	1995–96	Buckingham, Quebec	fourth (**1986**, 1989, **1995**)
25	(Canada)	Mike Keane	RW	R	1995–96	Winnipeg, Manitoba	third (1989, **1993**)
26	(Canada)	Stephane Yelle	C	L	1993–94	Ottawa, Ontario	first
48	(United States)	Scott Young	RW	R	1992–93	Clinton, Massachusetts	second (**1991**)

=== Florida Panthers ===
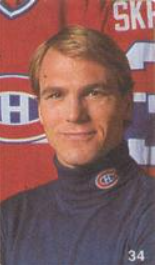
Brian Skrudland captained the Panthers to their first Stanley Cup Final appearance in franchise history.

#	Nat	Player	Position	Hand	Acquired	Place of birth	Finals appearance
30	(Canada)	Mark Fitzpatrick	G	L	1993–94	Toronto, Ontario	first
34	(United States)	John Vanbiesbrouck	G	L	1993–94	Detroit, Michigan	first
2	(Canada)	Terry Carkner	D	L	1995–96	Smiths Falls, Ontario	first
3	(Canada)	Paul Laus	D	R	1993–94	Beamsville, Ontario	first
5	(Canada)	Gord Murphy – **A**	D	R	1993–94	North York, Ontario	first
6	(Canada)	Jason Woolley	D	L	1994–95	Toronto, Ontario	first
23	(Canada)	Rhett Warrener	D	R	1994	Shaunavon, Saskatchewan	first
24	(Slovakia)	Robert Svehla	D	R	1993–94	Martin, Czechoslovakia	first
55	(Canada)	Ed Jovanovski	D	L	1994	Windsor, Ontario	first
10	(Canada)	Dave Lowry	LW	L	1993–94	Sudbury, Ontario	first
11	(United States)	Bill Lindsay	LW	L	1993–94	Bigfork, Montana	first
12	(Canada)	Jody Hull	RW	R	1993–94	Petrolia, Ontario	first
14	(Canada)	Stu Barnes	C	R	1993–94	Spruce Grove, Alberta	first
18	(Canada)	Mike Hough	LW	L	1993–94	Montreal, Quebec	first
9	(Czech Republic)	Radek Dvorak	RW	R	1995	Tábor, Czechoslovakia	first
20	(Canada)	Brian Skrudland – **C**	C	L	1993–94	Peace River, Alberta	third (**1986**, 1989)
21	(United States)	Tom Fitzgerald	RW	R	1993–94	Billerica, Massachusetts	first
26	(Canada)	Ray Sheppard	RW	R	1995–96	Pembroke, Ontario	second (1995)
27	(Canada)	Scott Mellanby – **A**	RW	R	1993–94	Montreal, Quebec	second (1987)
28	(Czech Republic)	Martin Straka	C	L	1995–96	Plzeň, Czechoslovakia	first
29	(Sweden)	Johan Garpenlov	LW	L	1995–96	Stockholm, Sweden	first
44	(Canada)	Rob Niedermayer	C	L	1993	Cassiar, British Columbia	first

== Stanley Cup engraving ==
The 1996 Stanley Cup was presented to Avalanche captain Joe Sakic by NHL Commissioner Gary Bettman following the Avalanche's 1–0 triple overtime win over the Panthers in game four.

The following Avalanche players and staff had their names engraved on the Stanley Cup

1995–96 Colorado Avalanche

=== Players ===
Centres

- 9 Mike Ricci (A)
- 10 Troy Murray †
- 19 Joe Sakic (Captain)
- 14 Dave Hannan*
- 21 Peter Forsberg*
- 26 Stephane Yelle

Wingers

- 12 Chris Simon †
- 13 Valeri Kamensky
- 16 Warren Rychel
- 18 Adam Deadmarsh ‡
- 20 Rene Corbet
- 22 Claude Lemieux
- 25 Mike Keane
- 48 Scott Young

Defencemen

- 2 Sylvain Lefebvre (A)
- 4 Uwe Krupp
- 5 Alexei Gusarov
- 6 Craig Wolanin (A)†
- 7 Curtis Leschyshyn (A)
- 8 Sandis Ozolinsh
- 24 Jon Klemm
- 52 Adam Foote

Goaltenders

- 33 Patrick Roy
- 35 Stephane Fiset
- * Played both centre and wing.
- † Did not play or dress in the Final.

=== Coaching and administrative staff ===
- Charlie Lyons (Chairman/Chief Executive Officer/Owner/President/Governor), Pierre Lacroix (Vice President/General Manager), Marc Crawford (Head Coach)
- Joel Quenneville (Asst. Coach), Jacques Cloutier (Goaltending Coach), Francois Giguere (Asst. General Manager)
- Michel Goulet (Director of Player Personnel), Dave Draper (Chief Scout), Jean Martineau (Director of Public Relations)
- Pat Karns (Athletic Trainer), Matthew Sokolowski (Asst. Trainer), Rob McLean (Equipment Manager)
- Mike Kramer (Asst. Equipment Manager), Brock Gibbins (Asst. Equipment Manager), Skip Allen (Strength-Conditioning Coach)
- Paul Fixter (Video Coordinator), Leo Vyssokov (Massage Therapist)

=== Engraving notes ===
- #8 Sandis Ozolinsh (D) – was the first Latvian born and trained player to win the Stanley Cup.
- #4 Uwe Krupp (D) – was the first German born and trained player to win the Stanley Cup.
- Adam Deadmarsh's name was misspelled ADAM DEADMARCH. This mistake was corrected by stamping an "S" over the "C" twice. Deadmarsh's name was the first player's name to be corrected on the Presentation Stanley Cup.

== Broadcasting ==
In Canada, the series was televised on CBC. In the United States, this was the second year that coverage was split between Fox and ESPN. Fox broadcast games 1 and 3 while ESPN televised games 2 and 4. The Stanley Cup-clinching game thus aired on cable. Had the series extended, Fox would have televised games 5 and 7, and ESPN would have aired game 6.

== See also ==
- 1995–96 NHL season
- 1995-96 Colorado Avalanche season
- List of Stanley Cup champions

Preceded by New Jersey Devils; 1995	Colorado Avalanche; Stanley Cup champions 1996	Succeeded by Detroit Red Wings; 1997
