= Chris Simon =

Canadian ice hockey player (1972–2024)

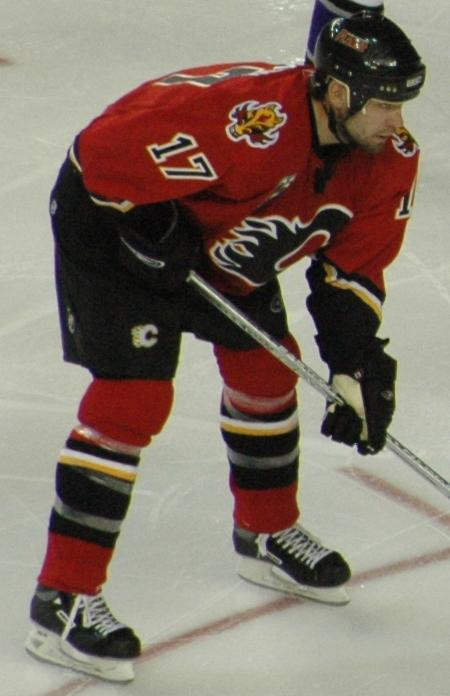
- Simon with the Calgary Flames in 2005
- Born: January 30, 1972 Wawa, Ontario, Canada
- Died: March 18, 2024 (aged 52) Wawa, Ontario, Canada
- Height: 6 ft 4 in (193 cm)
- Weight: 232 lb (105 kg; 16 st 8 lb)
- Position: Left wing
- Shot: Left
- Played for: Quebec Nordiques; Colorado Avalanche; Washington Capitals; Chicago Blackhawks; New York Rangers; Calgary Flames; New York Islanders; Minnesota Wild; Vityaz Chekhov; UHC Dynamo; Metallurg Novokuznetsk
- NHL draft: 25th overall, 1990; Philadelphia Flyers
- Playing career: 1992–2013

Christopher J. Simon (January 30, 1972 – March 18, 2024) was a Canadian professional ice hockey left winger who played in the National Hockey League (NHL) and Kontinental Hockey League (KHL). Known for his physical style of play and enforcer role, Simon played over 15 seasons in the NHL with teams including the Quebec Nordiques, Colorado Avalanche, Washington Capitals, Chicago Blackhawks, New York Rangers, Calgary Flames, New York Islanders, and Minnesota Wild. He was part of the 1996 Stanley Cup-winning Colorado Avalanche team. Simon was also known for his aggressive play, receiving eight suspensions throughout his NHL career, totaling 65 games. After leaving the NHL, he continued his career in the KHL before retiring from professional hockey in 2013.

== Playing career ==
Simon grew up in Wawa, Ontario, playing his minor hockey for the Wawa Flyers of the NOHA. As a Bantam, he played Jr.B. hockey for the Sault Ste. Marie Thunderbirds of the NOJHL in 1987–88. Simon was selected in the third round (42nd overall) of the 1988 OHL Priority Selection by the Ottawa 67's. As a teen, he fought addictions and served an eight-game suspension for a stick-swinging incident while on the 67's. Simon subsequently became sober and counselled indigenous youth on the dangers of alcohol. He later said he would not have made it in the NHL if he had not quit drinking.

During the 1990–91 OHL season, Simon served a 12-game suspension for slashing David Babcock in the face, breaking seven teeth and opening a gash that required 21 stitches. The following season, Simon was suspended eight times for a total of 34 games, on two of those occasions by his own team.

Simon was drafted in the second round (25th overall) of the 1990 NHL entry draft by the Philadelphia Flyers, but was traded as part of the Eric Lindros trade to the Quebec Nordiques before playing any games for the Flyers. He also played for the Calgary Flames, Colorado Avalanche, Washington Capitals, Chicago Blackhawks, New York Rangers (where he split the season as a left wing and right wing), New York Islanders, and Minnesota Wild.

In 1996, Simon won the Stanley Cup with the Avalanche. Each player on the winning team is given 24 hours alone with the Cup. Simon took it to his hometown of Wawa, Ontario. After showing it to the townspeople he and his maternal grandfather took the Cup on a fishing trip.

Simon was a member of the Washington Capitals when they went to the 1998 Stanley Cup Final. He had been enjoying great offensive success that season until a shoulder injury knocked him out for much of the playoff run. Simon underwent season-ending shoulder surgery in December 1998. He was the team's leading goal scorer in the 1999–2000 season, with 29 goals in 75 games. Simon also made it to the Stanley Cup Final with the Calgary Flames in 2004, and played for the Flames for two seasons before being signed as a free agent in 2006 by the New York Islanders. He was then traded to the Minnesota Wild for a sixth round draft pick.

Simon was of Ojibwa descent, and was born in Wawa, Ontario. Simon was seen as a role model to Indigenous Canadians for his accomplishments in the NHL.

=== Suspensions ===
Simon was involved in numerous on-ice incidents and was suspended eight times by the NHL for his conduct, for a grand total of 65 games.

==== Mike Grier incident ====
On November 8, 1997, during a game against the Edmonton Oilers, Simon was suspended three games for directing a racial slur at Edmonton's Mike Grier. Grier allegedly made derogatory comments about Simon's Ojibwe heritage, and Simon allegedly responded with a racial slur towards Grier, who is black, although the words spoken between the two players were never confirmed. Simon flew to Toronto to apologize to Grier, who accepted. Grier and Simon were later teammates for a brief time in 2002 with the Washington Capitals.

==== Ryan Hollweg incident ====
On March 8, 2007, the Islanders faced their rival, the New York Rangers, at the Nassau Veterans Memorial Coliseum. At 13:25 of the third period, Rangers forward Ryan Hollweg checked Simon from (what Simon felt was) behind, knocking him face first into the boards, and giving Simon a concussion. No penalty was assessed, and play continued. Simon then took a two-handed baseball swing in the face of Ryan Hollweg with his hockey stick as he skated by. Simon received a match penalty for attempt to injure, resulting in his ejection from the game. Hollweg suffered a cut to the chin that required two stitches. According to ESPN's Barry Melrose, Hollweg escaped serious injury because Simon's blow caught his shoulder pads before hitting his face.

Simon was automatically suspended indefinitely by the NHL due to his match penalty pending ruling by the league commissioner Gary Bettman and disciplinarian Colin Campbell. On March 11, he was suspended for the rest of the season, including playoffs, with a minimum of 25 games, and since the Islanders only played five playoff games, it continued into the first five games of the 2007–08 season. The Nassau County district attorney considered filing criminal charges against Simon, but declined. Hollweg later told Newsday that he was not interested in pressing charges.

On March 10, Simon issued a statement in which he apologized to Hollweg and the league, and said that there is "absolutely no place in hockey" for what he did. He asserted that he did not remember much about the incident because he was "completely out of it" as a result of the concussion.

==== Jarkko Ruutu incident ====
On December 15, 2007, at 14:06 of the third period of a home game against the Pittsburgh Penguins, Tim Jackman and Jarkko Ruutu exchanged words between the teams' benches during a stoppage of play. Simon skated in behind Ruutu and pulled Ruutu's leg back with his own. When Ruutu fell to his knees, Simon stomped on the back of Ruutu's right leg with his skate and then stepped into the bench area. The incident was witnessed by referee Justin St. Pierre, who assessed Simon a match penalty for attempt to injure and ejected him from the game. The following Monday, Simon agreed to go on indefinite paid leave from the team, saying there was "no excuse" for his actions and that he needed some time away from hockey. However, the next day, Simon was suspended without pay for 30 games, the third-longest suspension for an on-ice incident in modern NHL history behind a 41-game suspension to Raffi Torres in 2015 and a one-year suspension handed down to Marty McSorley in 2000 (though McSorley only sat out 23 games before his contract expired and he left the NHL). League disciplinarian Colin Campbell said that in his opinion, Simon had "repeatedly evidence(d) the lack of ability to control his actions," and also stressed that this was his eighth disciplinary hearing. Following the suspension, Simon returned to play one more game with the New York Islanders before being traded to the Minnesota Wild.

After Chris Pronger was not initially disciplined by the NHL when he stomped on Ryan Kesler's leg on March 12, 2008, Simon decried what he saw as unfair and unequal treatment. On March 15, 2008, after a second review, the NHL suspended Pronger for eight games.

==== Minor incidents ====
Simon was suspended for one game during the 2000 Stanley Cup playoffs for cross-checking Pittsburgh Penguins' Peter Popovic across the throat on April 13, 2000. He was given two-game suspensions, first on April 5, 2001, for elbowing Anders Eriksson, and twice more in 2004 for cross checking Tampa Bay Lightning's Ruslan Fedotenko and then jumping on and punching him, and for kneeing Dallas Stars's Sergei Zubov.

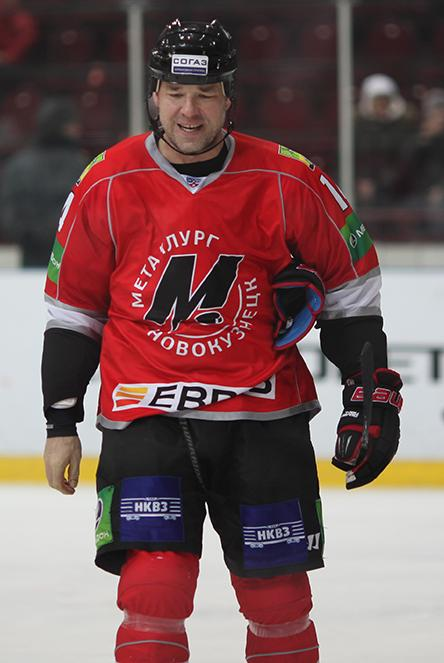
Simon during his final KHL season with Metallurg Novokuznetsk in 2013

=== KHL ===
Simon played for five seasons in the KHL after his last season in the NHL in 2007-08. He played for three teams in the KHL, including Chekhov Vityaz (113 games from 2008-2011), Moscow Dynamo (9 games during the 2010-2011 season), and Novokuznetsk Metallurg (52 games from 2011-2013). In a total of 168 regular season games played, he attained 41 goals, 48 assists, 574 penalty minutes. He appeared once in the playoffs with Moscow Dynamo, playing six games, scoring two goals and earning 18 minutes of penalties. He retired from the KHL in 2013.

== Personal life and death ==
His father, John, is of Ojibwe descent from the Wiikwemkoong First Nation on Manitoulin Island. As a teenager, he struggled with an addiction to alcohol but was helped to sobriety by future NHL coach Ted Nolan in 1992.

Simon's first wife was Lauri Smith and they had a son. Later they divorced. He and his second wife Valerie had four children and they divorced in 2017.

In 2017, Simon filed for bankruptcy and claimed he was unable to work due to his hockey injuries. In the filing, a doctor testified that Simon had symptoms of chronic traumatic encephalopathy (CTE) which were believed to be attributed to significant brain trauma during his hockey career. The doctor further claimed that Simon suffered from depression, anxiety, post-traumatic stress disorder, and arthritis.

Simon died by suicide on March 18, 2024, at the age of 52, attributed, by his family, to his struggles with CTE. In April 2025, it was confirmed Simon had stage three CTE.

== Career statistics ==
			Regular season					Playoffs
Season	Team	League	GP	G	A	Pts	PIM	GP	G	A	Pts	PIM
1988–89	Ottawa 67's	OHL	36	4	2	6	31	—	—	—	—	—
1989–90	Ottawa 67's	OHL	57	36	38	74	146	3	2	1	3	4
1990–91	Ottawa 67's	OHL	20	16	6	22	69	17	5	9	14	59
1991–92	Sault Ste. Marie Greyhounds	OHL	31	19	25	44	143	11	5	8	13	49
1992–93	Halifax Citadels	AHL	36	12	6	18	131	—	—	—	—	—
1992–93	Quebec Nordiques	NHL	16	1	1	2	67	5	0	0	0	26
1993–94	Quebec Nordiques	NHL	37	4	4	8	132	—	—	—	—	—
1994–95	Quebec Nordiques	NHL	29	3	9	12	106	6	1	1	2	19
1995–96	Colorado Avalanche	NHL	64	16	18	34	250	12	1	2	3	11
1996–97	Washington Capitals	NHL	42	9	13	22	165	—	—	—	—	—
1997–98	Washington Capitals	NHL	28	7	10	17	38	18	1	0	1	26
1998–99	Washington Capitals	NHL	23	3	7	10	48	—	—	—	—	—
1999–2000	Washington Capitals	NHL	75	29	20	49	146	4	2	0	2	24
2000–01	Washington Capitals	NHL	60	10	10	20	109	6	1	0	1	4
2001–02	Washington Capitals	NHL	82	14	17	31	137	—	—	—	—	—
2002–03	Washington Capitals	NHL	10	0	2	2	23	—	—	—	—	—
2002–03	Chicago Blackhawks	NHL	61	12	6	18	125	—	—	—	—	—
2003–04	New York Rangers	NHL	65	14	9	23	225	—	—	—	—	—
2003–04	Calgary Flames	NHL	13	3	2	5	25	16	5	2	7	74
2005–06	Calgary Flames	NHL	72	8	14	22	94	6	0	1	1	7
2006–07	New York Islanders	NHL	67	10	17	27	75	—	—	—	—	—
2007–08	New York Islanders	NHL	28	1	2	3	43	—	—	—	—	—
2007–08	Minnesota Wild	NHL	10	0	0	0	16	2	0	0	0	0
2008–09	Vityaz Chekhov	KHL	40	8	20	28	263	—	—	—	—	—
2009–10	Vityaz Chekhov	KHL	30	13	12	25	110	—	—	—	—	—
2010–11	Vityaz Chekhov	KHL	43	16	12	28	111	—	—	—	—	—
2010–11	UHC Dynamo	KHL	3	0	1	1	0	6	2	0	2	18
2011–12	Metallurg Novokuznetsk	KHL	24	3	0	3	43	—	—	—	—	—
2012–13	Metallurg Novokuznetsk	KHL	28	1	2	3	28	—	—	—	—	—
NHL totals			864	144	161	305	1824	75	10	7	17	191
KHL totals			168	41	46	87	553	6	2	0	2	18

== Awards and honours ==
Award	Year	Ref
NHL
Stanley Cup champion	1996	
KHL
All-Star Game	2010, 2011	
