= Triple Gold Club =

Prestigious group of award-winners in ice hockey

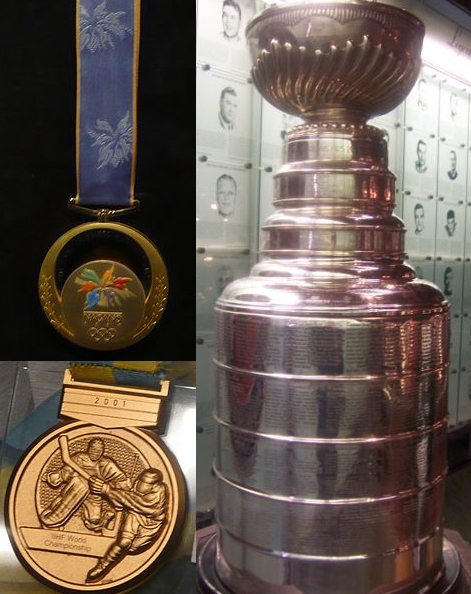
There are three components to the Triple Gold Club (clockwise from top left): an Olympic Games gold medal, the Stanley Cup and a World Championship gold medal.

The Triple Gold Club is the group of ice hockey players and coaches who have won an Olympic Games gold medal, a World Championship gold medal, and the Stanley Cup, the championship trophy of the National Hockey League (NHL). The International Ice Hockey Federation (IIHF) considers them to be "the three most important championships available to the sport".

Tomas Jonsson, Mats Näslund, and Håkan Loob became the first members on 27 February 1994 when Sweden won the gold medal at the 1994 Winter Olympics. The term first entered popular use following the 2002 Winter Olympics, which saw the addition of the first Canadian members. On 8 May 2007, the IIHF announced it would formalize the club and recognize the players who had won the three championships. The induction ceremony was held, with all 22 members at the time present, at the 2010 Winter Olympics in Vancouver, on 22 February 2010.

There are 30 player members of the Triple Gold Club—eleven Canadians, nine Swedes, seven Russians, two Czechs, and one Finn. Eleven of the players are defencemen and the remaining players are forwards; to date, no goaltender has achieved the honor. From the time of their first victory, Niklas Kronwall, Mikael Samuelsson and Henrik Zetterberg took the least time to join the club, winning the Olympics and World Championships in 2006 (as members of the Swedish national team) and the Stanley Cup in 2008 (as members of the Detroit Red Wings). In contrast, it took Russian Viacheslav Fetisov 19 years from his first victory to become a member. Jonathan Toews is the youngest player to accomplish the feat, winning the third championship (the Stanley Cup) at the age of 22 years, 42 days; Pavel Datsyuk is the oldest, winning Olympic gold at 39 years, 220 days. Russians Fetisov and Igor Larionov, and Swede Peter Forsberg are the only players to have won each of the three championships more than once. Ten members of the Triple Gold Club have won the Stanley Cup as part of the Detroit Red Wings, more than any other NHL team.

Mike Babcock became the first, and so far only, coach to win all three components of the Triple Gold Club on 28 February 2010 when he led Canada to a gold medal at the 2010 Winter Olympics. He won the World Championship in 2004 and coached the Red Wings to a Stanley Cup win in 2008. In 2015, Sidney Crosby became the first Triple Gold Club member to captain all three of his winning teams. On 29 May 2022, Valtteri Filppula became the latest member of the club, playing for Finland in the 2022 IIHF World Championship.

Beginning in 2026, the IIHF began to recognize a women's Triple Gold Club as well, consisting of an Olympic Games gold medal, a Women's World Championship gold medal, and the Walter Cup, the championship trophy of the Professional Women's Hockey League (PWHL). Hayley Scamurra became the first recognized member on 17 November 2026, following the United States' gold medal at the 2026 Women's World Championship, marking her third component of Triple Gold in a calendar year; however, she de facto achieved the Club on 20 May 2026, after the Montreal Victoire won the Walter Cup in the 2026 Walter Cup Finals. Multiple other women's players have also won all three components, but have not been formally recognized as of 2026.

== Components ==
The IIHF considers the components of the club to be "the three most important championships available to the sport". The club has been described as "a modern fraternity" because NHL players were not allowed to play in the World Championships until 1977 and not allowed in the Olympics until 1988 (with NHL co-operation beginning in 1998), as both were amateur championships. The Soviet and Czechoslovak teams were populated with amateur players who were actually full-time athletes hired as regular workers of a company (aircraft industry, food workers, tractor industry) or organization (KGB, Red Army, Soviet Air Force) that sponsored what would be presented as an after-hours social sports society hockey team for their workers. Additionally, many Eastern bloc players were not allowed (some defected) to play in the NHL and win the Stanley Cup before the fall of the Iron Curtain in 1989.

Five Canadians won an Olympic gold medal in 1920, 1924 or 1928 as well as a Stanley Cup. Those Olympic ice hockey tournaments are also World Championships as there was not a separate world championship tournament until 1930. The five are Frank Frederickson, Haldor Halderson, Dunc Munro, Hooley Smith, and Dave Trottier. The IIHF does not recognize these players as members of the Triple Gold Club.

=== Olympic gold medal ===
The men's tournament was first held at the 1920 Summer Olympics and integrated in the Winter Olympic program starting with the 1924 Winter Olympics. The Olympic Games were originally intended for amateur athletes, so the players of the NHL and other professional leagues were not allowed to play. Canada dominated the first three decades, winning six of seven gold medals. The Soviet Union first participated in 1956, and overtook Canada as the dominant international team, winning seven of the nine tournaments in which they participated. The only two tournaments that the Soviets failed to win, in 1960 and 1980, were hosted and won by the United States. Other nations to win gold include Great Britain in 1936, Sweden in 1994 and 2006, and the Czech Republic in 1998.

Many of Canada's top players were NHL professionals, so the Canadian Amateur Hockey Association (CAHA) pushed for the ability to use professional and amateur players. The International Olympic Committee (IOC) voted to allow all athletes to compete in Olympic Games held after 1988. The NHL was initially reluctant to allow its players to compete because the Olympics are held in the middle of the NHL season. An agreement was later reached and NHL players began competing in 1998. The NHL rescinded their agreement for allowing their players to participate beginning at the 2018 Winter Olympics.

=== World Championship gold medal ===
The Ice Hockey World Championship is an annual tournament organized by the International Ice Hockey Federation (IIHF). The tournament held at the 1920 Summer Olympics is recognized as the first Ice Hockey World Championship. Between 1920 and 1968, the Olympic hockey tournament was also considered the World Championship for that year. The first World Championship that was held as an individual event was in 1930 in which twelve nations participated. The modern format for the World Championship features 16 teams in the championship group. The teams play a preliminary round and the top eight teams play in the playoff medal round.

Canada was the first dominant team, winning the tournament 12 times between 1930 and 1952. The Soviet Union first participated in 1954 and from 1963 until 1991 was the dominant team, winning 20 championships. During that period, only three other nations won medals: Canada, Czechoslovakia and Sweden. Russia first participated in 1992 and the Czech Republic and Slovakia joined in 1993. In the 2000s, the tournament became more competitive as the "big six" teams (Canada, the Czech Republic, Finland, Russia, Sweden and the United States) became evenly matched.

=== Stanley Cup ===
The Stanley Cup is the championship trophy awarded to the National Hockey League (NHL) playoffs champion. The Stanley Cup is the oldest professional sports trophy in North America and is surrounded by numerous legends and traditions. Unlike the trophies awarded by the other three major professional sports leagues of North America, a new Stanley Cup is not made each year; winners keep it until a new champion is crowned. It is the only trophy in professional sports that has the name of the winning players, coaches, management and club staff engraved on its chalice.

Originally inscribed the Dominion Hockey Challenge Cup, the trophy was donated in 1892, by then Governor General of Canada Lord Stanley of Preston, as an award for Canada's top-ranking amateur ice hockey club. The competition for the Cup went through several eras, with teams challenging for it, inter-league competition, and finally the NHL championship. After a series of league mergers and folds, it became the de facto championship trophy of the NHL in 1926 and the official trophy in 1947.

== Members ==
*	Player is a member of the Hockey Hall of Fame.
^	Player is still active.
Text in **bold** indicates the specific championship that made that player or coach a member of the club.

=== Players ===
Nat.	Player	Membership gained	Olympic gold	World Championship	Stanley Cup
(Sweden)	Tomas Jonsson	27 February 1994	**Sweden 1994**	Sweden 1991	New York Islanders 1982, 1983
(Sweden)	Mats Näslund	27 February 1994	**Sweden 1994**	Sweden 1991	Montreal Canadiens 1986
(Sweden)	Håkan Loob	27 February 1994	**Sweden 1994**	Sweden 1987, 1991	Calgary Flames 1989
(Russia)	Valeri Kamensky	10 June 1996	USSR 1988	USSR 1986, 1989, 1990	**Colorado Avalanche 1996**
(Russia)	Alexei Gusarov	10 June 1996	USSR 1988	USSR 1986, 1989, 1990	**Colorado Avalanche 1996**
(Sweden)	Peter Forsberg *	10 June 1996	Sweden 1994, 2006	Sweden 1992, 1998	**Colorado Avalanche 1996**, 2001
(Russia)	Viacheslav Fetisov *	7 June 1997	USSR 1984, 1988	USSR 1978, 1981, 1982, 1983, 1986, 1989, 1990	**Detroit Red Wings 1997**, 1998
(Russia)	Igor Larionov *	7 June 1997	USSR 1984, 1988	USSR 1982, 1983, 1986, 1989	**Detroit Red Wings 1997**, 1998, 2002
(Russia)	Alexander Mogilny *	10 June 2000	USSR 1988	USSR 1989	**New Jersey Devils 2000**
(Russia)	Vladimir Malakhov	10 June 2000	Unified Team 1992	USSR 1990	**New Jersey Devils 2000**
(Canada)	Rob Blake *	24 February 2002	**Canada 2002**	Canada 1994, 1997	Colorado Avalanche 2001
(Canada)	Joe Sakic *	24 February 2002	**Canada 2002**	Canada 1994	Colorado Avalanche 1996, 2001
(Canada)	Brendan Shanahan *	24 February 2002	**Canada 2002**	Canada 1994	Detroit Red Wings 1997, 1998, 2002
(Canada)	Scott Niedermayer *	9 May 2004	Canada 2002, 2010	**Canada 2004**	New Jersey Devils 1995, 2000, 2003; Anaheim Ducks 2007
(Czech Republic)	Jaromír Jágr ^	15 May 2005	Czech Republic 1998	**Czech Republic 2005**, 2010	Pittsburgh Penguins 1991, 1992
(Czech Republic)	Jiří Šlégr	15 May 2005	Czech Republic 1998	**Czech Republic 2005**	Detroit Red Wings 2002
(Sweden)	Nicklas Lidström *	26 February 2006	**Sweden 2006**	Sweden 1991	Detroit Red Wings 1997, 1998, 2002, 2008
(Sweden)	Fredrik Modin	26 February 2006	**Sweden 2006**	Sweden 1998	Tampa Bay Lightning 2004
(Canada)	Chris Pronger *	6 June 2007	Canada 2002, 2010	Canada 1997	**Anaheim Ducks 2007**
(Sweden)	Niklas Kronwall	4 June 2008	Sweden 2006	Sweden 2006	**Detroit Red Wings 2008**
(Sweden)	Henrik Zetterberg	4 June 2008	Sweden 2006	Sweden 2006	**Detroit Red Wings 2008**
(Sweden)	Mikael Samuelsson	4 June 2008	Sweden 2006	Sweden 2006	**Detroit Red Wings 2008**
(Canada)	Eric Staal	28 February 2010	**Canada 2010**	Canada 2007	Carolina Hurricanes 2006
(Canada)	Jonathan Toews	9 June 2010	Canada 2010, 2014	Canada 2007	**Chicago Blackhawks 2010**, 2013, 2015
(Canada)	Patrice Bergeron *	15 June 2011	Canada 2010, 2014	Canada 2004	**Boston Bruins 2011**
(Canada)	Sidney Crosby ^	17 May 2015	Canada 2010, 2014	**Canada 2015**	Pittsburgh Penguins 2009, 2016, 2017
(Canada)	Corey Perry ^	22 May 2016	Canada 2010, 2014	**Canada 2016**	Anaheim Ducks 2007
(Russia)	Pavel Datsyuk *	25 February 2018	**OAR 2018**	Russia 2012	Detroit Red Wings 2002, 2008
(Canada)	Jay Bouwmeester	12 June 2019	Canada 2014	Canada 2003, 2004	**St. Louis Blues 2019**
(Finland)	Valtteri Filppula	29 May 2022	Finland 2022	**Finland 2022**	Detroit Red Wings 2008

=== Coaches ===
Nat.	Coach	Membership gained	Olympic gold	World Championship	Stanley Cup
(Canada)	Mike Babcock	28 February 2010	**Canada 2010**, 2014	Canada 2004	Detroit Red Wings 2008

=== Women's players ===
Nat.	Player	Membership gained	Olympic gold	World Championship	Walter Cup
(United States)	Hayley Scamurra ^	20 May 2026 (Note: Not formally recognized until 17 November 2026.)	United States 2026	United States 2019, 2023, 2025, 2026	**Montreal Victoire 2026**

== See also ==
- List of IIHF World Championship medalists
- List of Olympic medalists in ice hockey
- List of Stanley Cup champions
