= Björn Krupp =

American-born German ice hockey player (born 1991)

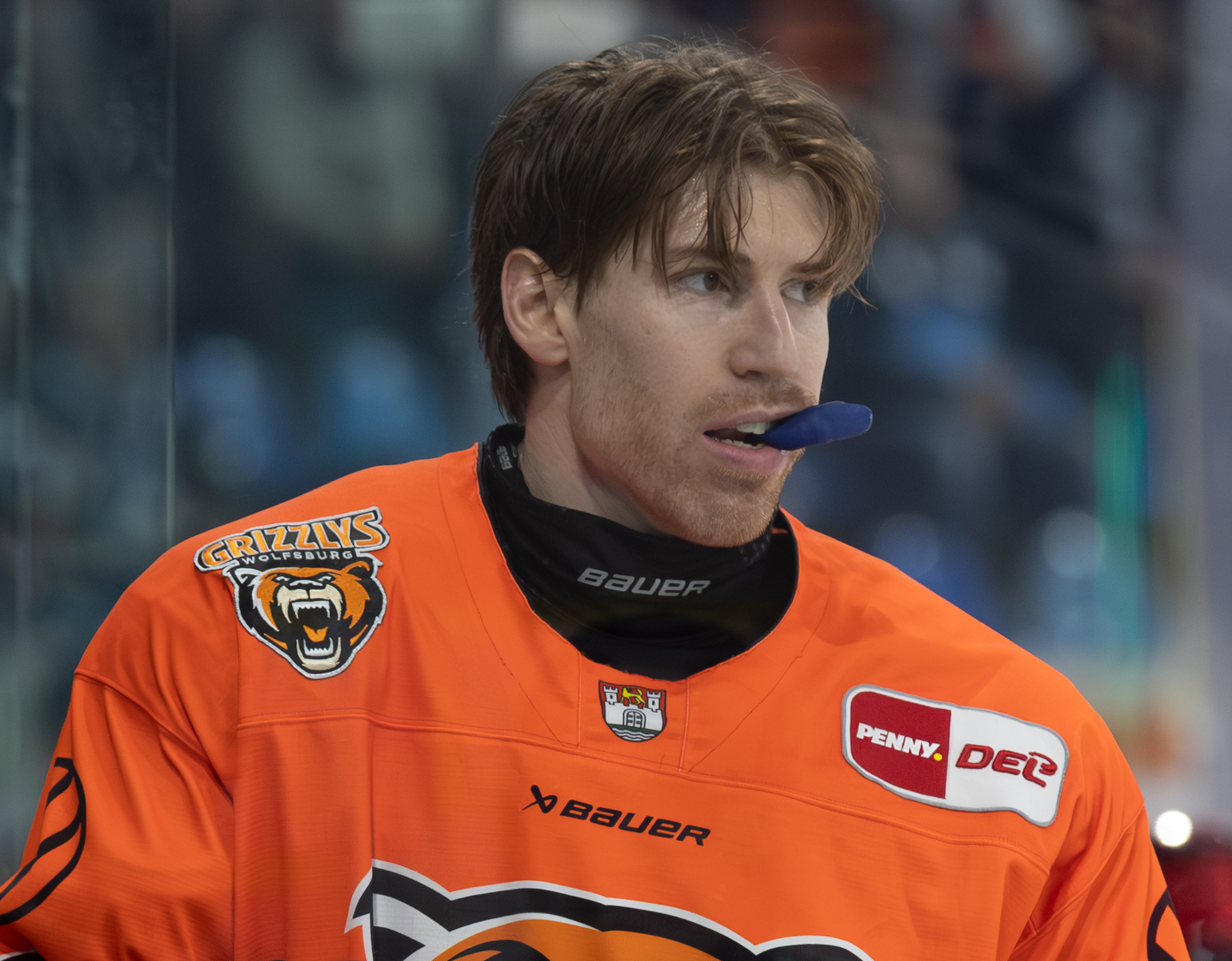
- Krupp in 2025
- Born: March 6, 1991 (age 34) Buffalo, New York, U.S.
- Height: 6 ft 3 in (191 cm)
- Weight: 203 lb (92 kg; 14 st 7 lb)
- Position: Defense
- Shoots: Left
- DEL team Former teams: Grizzlys Wolfsburg; Kölner Haie; Adler Mannheim
- National team: Germany
- NHL draft: Undrafted
- Playing career: 2011–present

Björn Krupp (born March 6, 1991) is an American-born German professional ice hockey defenseman playing for Grizzlys Wolfsburg of the Deutsche Eishockey Liga (DEL). He is the son of former NHL defenseman Uwe Krupp.

== Playing career ==
=== Early life ===
Krupp was born in Buffalo, New York when his father was a member of the NHL's Buffalo Sabres. Krupp spent time living in both the United States and Canada as a result of his father's career, but moved back to Germany with his mother after his parents' divorce in 1996. In 2002, he returned to North America, where his father was in his last NHL season with the Atlanta Thrashers at the time, and started playing ice hockey there at the age of eleven.

His early career included spells playing midget with TPH Thunder (2006–2007) and major junior hockey with Ontario Hockey League team, the Belleville Bulls (2008–2011).

=== Professional ===
Undrafted, in September 2011, he returned to Germany and signed for Kölner Haie of the Deutsche Eishockey Liga (DEL), where he was coached by his father.

In December 2014, Krupp went on loan to fellow Deutsche Eishockey Liga side Grizzly Adams Wolfsburg, before signing a two-year deal at the club in April 2015.

In the midst of the 2018–19 season on November 17, 2018, Krupp agreed to a three-year contract with his third DEL club, Adler Mannheim, following the conclusion of his contract with Wolfsburg at seasons end.

On 13 May 2021, Krupp returned to former club Grizzlys Wolfsburg, signing as a free agent to a three-year contract through 2024.

== International play ==
Medal record

Representing Germany

Ice hockey

Olympic Games
Silver medal – second place	2018 Pyeongchang	

Krupp is a dual citizen of both Germany and the United States.

In 2007–08, Krupp was a member of the National Team Development Program representing the United States at the World U-17 Hockey Challenge.

On December 17, 2013, he made his senior international debut for Germany's men's national team in an exhibition game against Latvia.

Krupp later competed in the 2015 IIHF World Championship with Germany and saw action in seven games during the tournament. He also represented Germany at the 2018 IIHF World Championship.

== Career statistics ==
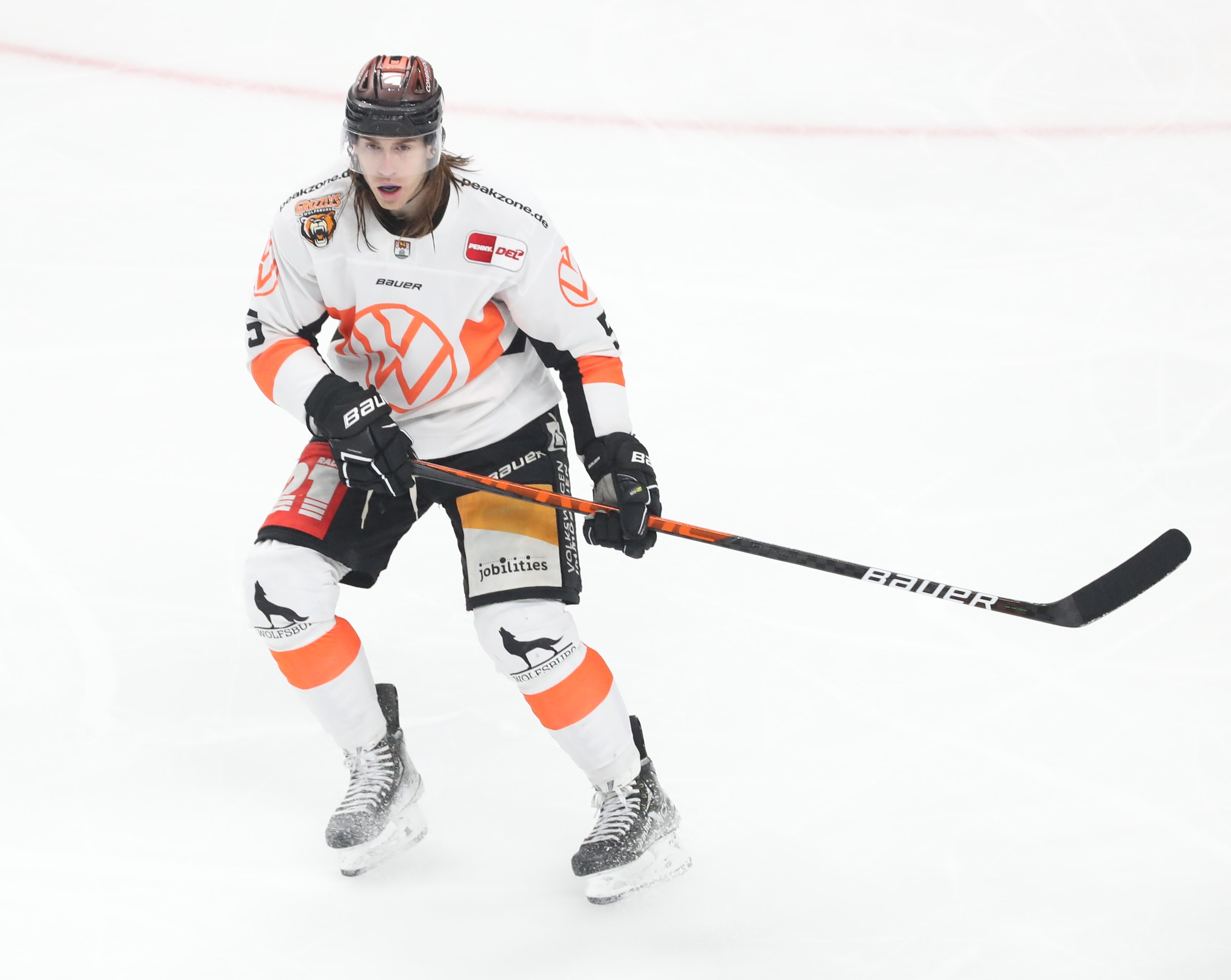
Krupp with Grizzlys Wolfsburg in 2022

=== Regular season and playoffs ===
			Regular season					Playoffs
Season	Team	League	GP	G	A	Pts	PIM	GP	G	A	Pts	PIM
2006–07	TPH Thunder 16U AAA	16U AAA	40	6	7	13	57	—	—	—	—	—
2007–08	U.S. NTDP U17	USDP	20	1	2	3	2	—	—	—	—	—
2007–08	U.S. NTDP U18	NAHL	43	0	3	3	40	3	1	0	1	0
2008–09	Belleville Bulls	OHL	57	1	3	4	22	17	0	0	0	9
2009–10	Belleville Bulls	OHL	67	0	11	11	53	—	—	—	—	—
2010–11	Belleville Bulls	OHL	61	1	10	11	54	4	0	0	0	2
2011–12	Kölner Haie	DEL	48	0	8	8	70	4	0	0	0	2
2012–13	Kölner Haie	DEL	40	1	8	9	22	12	0	2	2	8
2012–13	Füchse Duisburg	3.GBun	8	1	4	5	2	—	—	—	—	—
2013–14	Kölner Haie	DEL	52	4	4	8	48	17	0	2	2	16
2014–15	Kölner Haie	DEL	25	0	0	0	24	—	—	—	—	—
2014–15	Grizzly Adams Wolfsburg	DEL	26	1	4	5	22	11	0	0	0	20
2015–16	Grizzlys Wolfsburg	DEL	51	0	3	3	112	6	0	0	0	0
2016–17	Grizzlys Wolfsburg	DEL	51	0	8	8	114	18	1	1	2	6
2017–18	Grizzlys Wolfsburg	DEL	52	2	6	8	42	7	0	2	2	4
2018–19	Grizzlys Wolfsburg	DEL	49	0	6	6	12	—	—	—	—	—
2019–20	Adler Mannheim	DEL	36	1	2	3	53	—	—	—	—	—
2020–21	Adler Mannheim	DEL	33	2	2	4	14	6	0	0	0	2
2021–22	Grizzlys Wolfsburg	DEL	47	1	7	8	29	8	1	0	1	4
2022–23	Grizzlys Wolfsburg	DEL	54	5	7	12	42	14	1	2	3	8
2023–24	Grizzlys Wolfsburg	DEL	51	2	4	6	32	4	0	0	0	2
2024–25	Grizzlys Wolfsburg	DEL	40	0	2	2	18	—	—	—	—	—
DEL totals			655	19	71	90	654	107	3	9	12	72

=== International ===
Year	Team	Event	Result	GP	G	A	Pts	PIM
2008	United States	U17	2nd place, silver medalist(s)	6	0	0	0	4
2015	Germany	WC	10th	7	0	0	0	2
2018	Germany	OG	2nd place, silver medalist(s)	7	0	0	0	0
2018	Germany	WC	11th	7	1	0	1	0
Junior totals				6	0	0	0	4
Senior totals				21	1	0	1	2
