= Uwe Krupp =

German ice hockey player (born 1965)

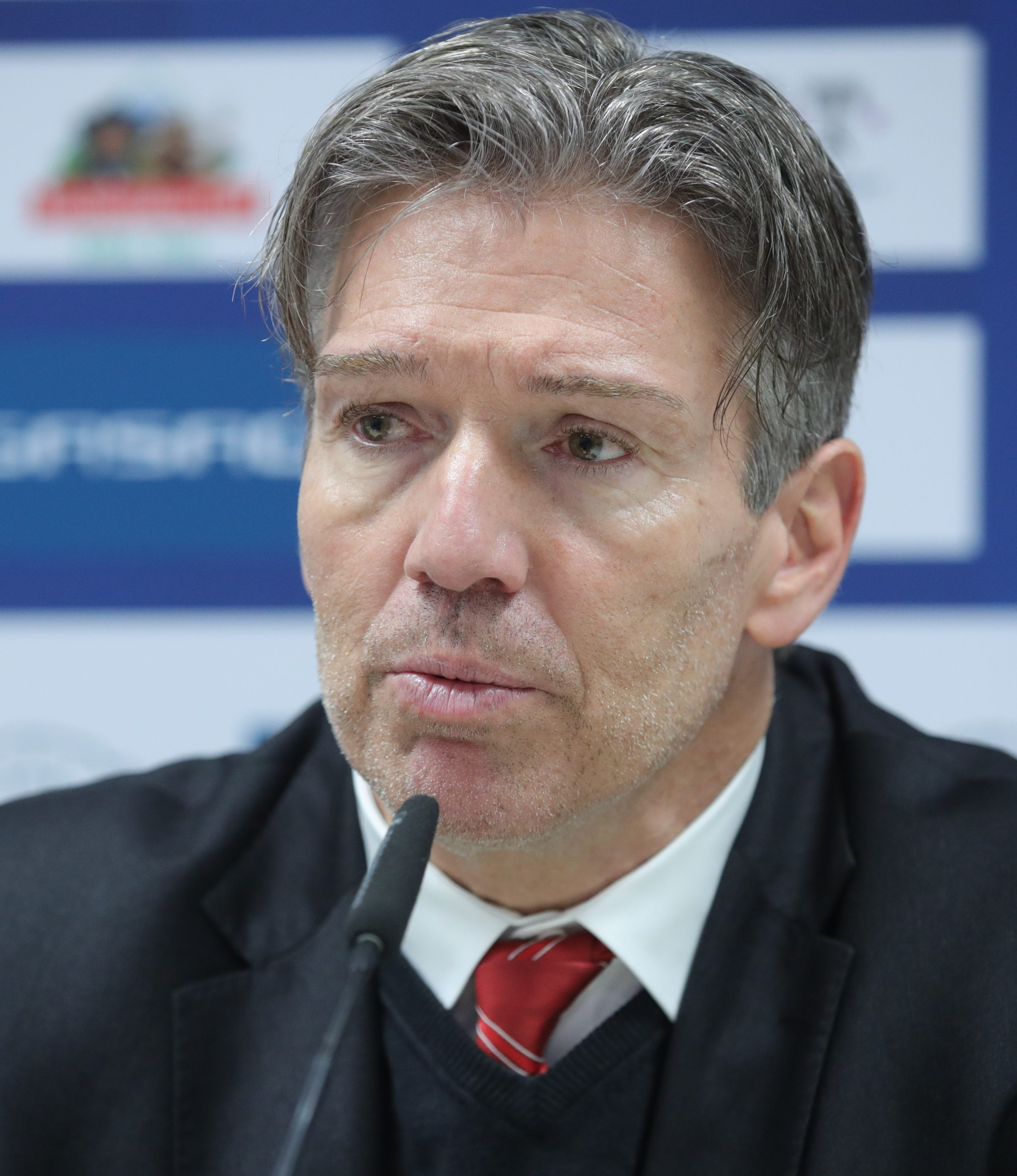
- Krupp in 2023
- Born: 24 June 1965 (age 61) Cologne, West Germany
- Height: 6 ft 6 in (198 cm)
- Weight: 235 lb (107 kg; 16 st 11 lb)
- Position: Defence
- Shot: Right
- Played for: Kölner Haie; Buffalo Sabres; New York Islanders; EV Landshut; Quebec Nordiques; Colorado Avalanche; Detroit Red Wings; Atlanta Thrashers
- National team: West Germany and Germany
- NHL draft: 214th overall, 1983; Buffalo Sabres
- Playing career: 1982–2003

Uwe Gerd Krupp (born 24 June 1965) is a German former professional hockey defenceman and currently the head coach of EV Landshut in Germany's Deutsche Eishockey Liga 2. Widely considered one of the greatest German players of all time, he was the second German-born player to win the Stanley Cup, and the second German-born professional to play in an National Hockey League All-Star Game.

Krupp spent his formative years in Germany and arrived in North America as a young but experienced professional. Krupp scored the Stanley Cup-clinching goal in triple overtime of game four of the 1996 Stanley Cup Final against the Florida Panthers. In retirement, Krupp was head coach of Kölner Haie. His son Björn Krupp is a professional ice hockey player.

Krupp was inducted into the IIHF Hall of Fame in 2017, and inducted into the German Ice Hockey Hall of Fame.

== Playing career ==
One of the few natives of Cologne to play for Kölner Haie in the Deutsche Eishockey Liga, Krupp was spotted by Scotty Bowman, the coach and general manager of the Buffalo Sabres, who chose him as the 214th pick in the 1983 NHL entry draft. After Kölner Haie won the German Championship in 1986, the team released Krupp to allow him to play in the NHL. He made his NHL debut against the Montreal Canadiens, but spent the latter part of the season with the Rochester Americans of the American Hockey League, where he was a member of the Americans team that won the Calder Cup. Krupp scored an overtime goal in Buffalo's final game the 1989–90 season against the Pittsburgh Penguins that eliminated the Penguins from playoff contention in favour of the New York Islanders, who defeated Philadelphia Flyers.

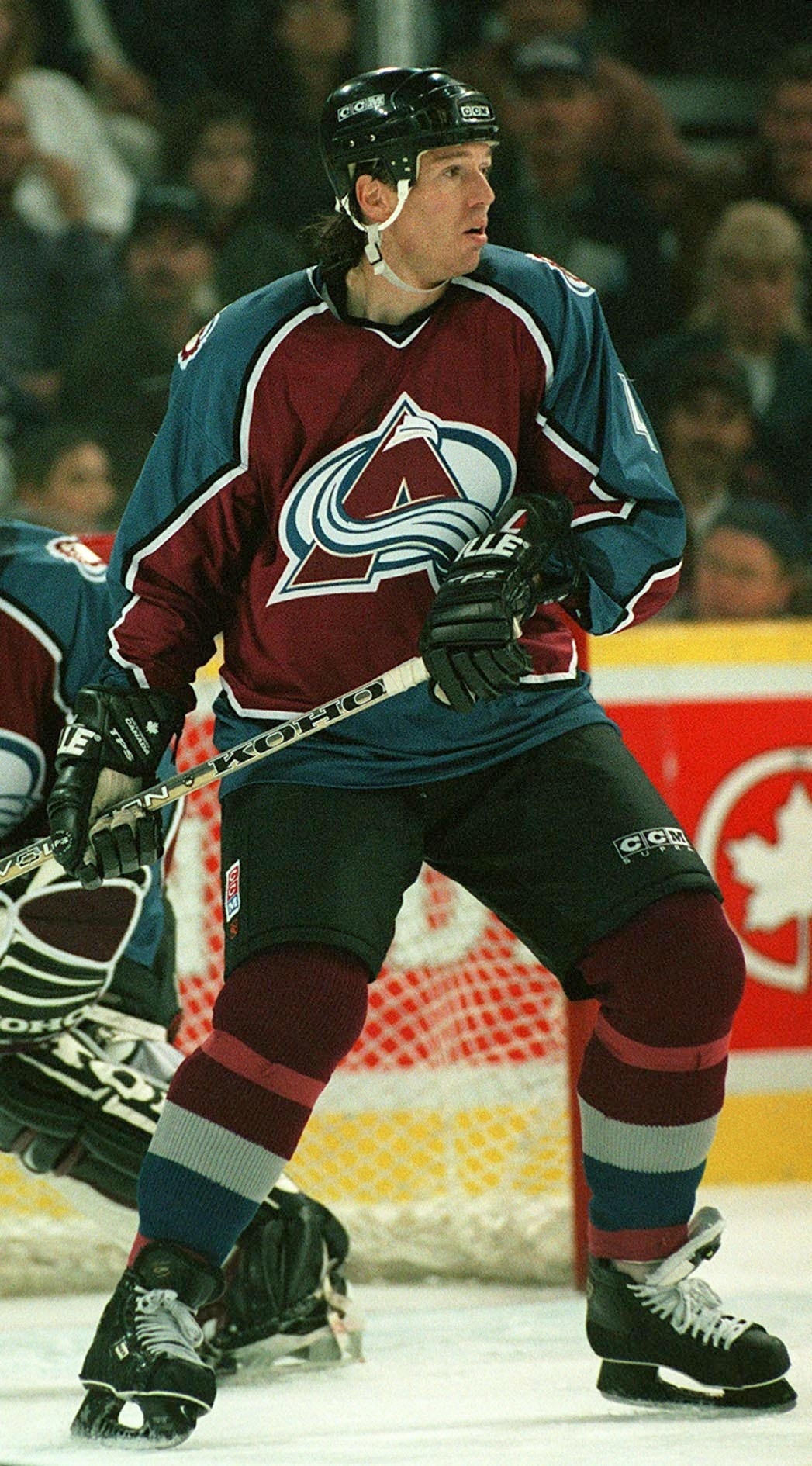
Krupp playing for the Colorado Avalanche at Northlands Coliseum in 1997

Krupp steadily improved as a mobile, puck-moving defenceman, increasing his point totals each year with the Sabres. In the 1990–91 season, he participated in the NHL All-Star game, the second German-born player to do so after Walt Tkaczuk. On 25 October 1991, the Sabres traded Krupp and Pierre Turgeon to the New York Islanders for Pat LaFontaine and Randy Wood. Krupp quickly settled with the Islanders, finishing second in scoring among defencemen behind Tom Kurvers, with 35 points in 59 games.

Krupp spent the next two seasons as one of the Islanders' top defenders, helping the team eliminate the defending Stanley Cup Champions Pittsburgh Penguins in the 1993 playoffs, and reach the Conference Finals against the heavily favoured Montreal Canadiens, which the Islanders lost. On 28 June 1994, the Islanders traded Krupp along with their first-round selection in the 1994 entry draft, who would become Wade Belak, to the Quebec Nordiques for Ron Sutter and their own first-round pick selection, used to select Brett Lindros. Krupp recorded 6 goals and 23 points for the Nordiques in the lockout-shortened 1994–95 season, and remained with the team after they relocated to Denver to become the Colorado Avalanche. During the lockdown, he played briefly for the Landshut Cannibals (EV Landshut) in the 1994/95 DEL season, appearing in 5 league games in November 1994, then he returned to the NHL. In these games he scored one goal and two assists.

In the 1995–96 season, Krupp was injured in the first game in Colorado Avalanche history, tearing the ACL, MCL and lateral meniscus in his left knee; he returned for the final five games of the regular season and playoffs, in which he scored 16 points in 22 playoff games. Krupp scored the winning goal of the 1996 Stanley Cup Final, in the third overtime period of the fourth game, becoming the first German-trained player on a Stanley Cup-winning team. He would later sign with the Detroit Red Wings. He missed the entirety of both the 1999–00 and 2000–01 seasons because of a back injury, and was suspended without pay by the Red Wings as he apparently contravened their medical advice by dogsledding while injured. He returned to play the following season and was a member of the Red Wings when they won the Stanley Cup in 2002. However, because he did not appear in enough games in the season, his name was not engraved on the Cup. After Detroit's cup win, Krupp was signed by the Atlanta Thrashers on July 19, 2002, to add size, leadership and veteran experience to the team's blueline, but would only play four games for the club throughout the season (October 11, 2002 and three games in February 2003) before retiring.

In his NHL career, Krupp played 729 games for the Buffalo Sabres, New York Islanders, Quebec Nordiques/Colorado Avalanche, Detroit Red Wings and Atlanta Thrashers before his retirement in 2003.

On 23 November 2009, before a game between the Colorado Avalanche and the Philadelphia Flyers, Krupp was named a member of the Avalanche Alumni Association. On January 17, 2017, the International Ice Hockey Federation's Historical Committee announced Krupp would be inducted into the IIHF Hall of Fame as part of the class of 2017. The selection committee stated:

"It’s difficult enough making an impact at the top levels of hockey, but it is doubly so for players outside the “Big Six,” because their chances of crafting an impressive resume through medals is greatly diminished. Yet it is easy to name Uwe Krupp as the finest hockey player Germany has ever produced. A defenceman of imposing size, he was nevertheless a fluid skater who brought the puck out of his zone with consistency."

=== International career ===
Krupp represented both West Germany and reunified Germany in international tournaments. During the 1990 World Championship, he failed a doping test after a game against Czechoslovakia and was banned from international play for 18 months.

== Coaching career ==
After announcing his retirement Krupp coached the Atlanta Duluth Ice Hawks youth team. He also served as coach at TPH Thunder AAA Hockey. This was short-lived as he was quickly appointed as an assistant coach to the German junior national team. Working up the ranks, he was appointed as an assistant coach to the men's national team under Greg Poss in 2005. Then, shortly before the Torino Olympics, Krupp was made coach of the German national ice hockey team on 15 December 2005, replacing Poss who resigned under heavy fire from the German media. Krupp had strong feelings the German media never gave Poss his fair chance, using the excuse Poss was from North America to stonewall any chance Poss may have had of success.

Krupp coached the German team to a tenth-place finish at the 2006 Olympic Games in Torino. He had drastic lineup changes in store before the 2006 World Championship B-Pool tournament. Facing strong criticism from the German tabloid media, Krupp chose a team of young players, leaving behind seven veterans from the Torino team, in addition to the top goal scorer in the German league. Skewing the team towards youth, he chose players who had led the Junior National team out of the "B-Pool" to lead the Germans past Israel, Hungary, Great Britain, Japan and the home country France. With an unheard-of average age of 22, the Germans outscored opponents 35–4 during their four-game ascent into the "A" group.

At the 2010 Olympic Games in Vancouver, the Germans remained winless, but they would bounce back a couple of months later. At the 2010 World Championships in Germany, Krupp led the German National Team to a semifinal appearance, Germany's best result at an international tournament since winning bronze at the 1976 Olympic Games. He remained in the job until November 2011. For his work, he was presented with the Xaver Unsinn Trophy. Under his guidance, the German team had also won the 2009 and 2010 Deutschland-Cup.

Krupp returned to his hometown team Kölner Haie and served as head coach starting 1 July 2011. One of his players on the Haie roster was his son Björn Krupp. Krupp was named best DEL coach of the 2012–13 season and inked a contract extension until 2017 in October 2013. Under his guidance, the team went to back-to-back DEL finals in 2013 and 2014. On 10 October 2014, Krupp, his assistants Brian McCutcheon and Ron Pasco as well as general manager Lance Nethery were sacked. In a statement, Kölner Haie CEO Peter Schönberger said the team needed a new direction.

Krupp took over head-coaching duties at Eisbären Berlin in December 2014. He guided the team to a playoff-semifinal appearance in 2017 and to the finals in 2018. Krupp parted company with the Eisbären organization after the conclusion of the 2017–18 season, he was named head coach of Czech club HC Sparta Praha on May 2, 2018. He was released in late January 2020. At that time, the team was third in the Extraliga table, but had only won two points out of the six previous games. Earlier in the 2019–20 season, Sparta had been on the top of the Extraliga standings. On February 24, 2020, he returned to Kölner Haie for a second stint as head coach.

On 14 January 2025, Krupp took over as head coach of HC Lugano in Switzerland's National League.

On 7 May 2025, he became the new head coach of EV Landshut in Germany's DEL2. In his first season he guided the team to a playoff-quarterfinal appearance.

== Personal life ==
Krupp was married twice and has four children between his relationships. His first marriage to Beate produced two sons, Björn and Cedric. The couple divorced in the summer of 1996, following the Avalanche's Stanley Cup victory. Krupp's second marriage was to former American bobsledder Valerie Buck. The couple divorced in 2014.

Krupp and his partner Claire have two children together; a son, Thomas and a daughter, Isabelle.

Krupp coached his son's youth team as a volunteer. Krupp was instrumental in recruiting younger German players to North America to compete in a variety of tournaments and camps.

Krupp returned to Germany in preparation for the 2010 World Championships which Germany hosted.

== Awards ==
- Member of two Stanley Cup winning teams: 1996 with the Colorado Avalanche and 2002 with the Detroit Red Wings
- Selected to two NHL All-Star Games: 1991 and 1999
- Inducted into the IIHF Hall of Fame in 2017
- Named into the IIHF All-Time Germany Team in 2020
- Krupp was inducted into the German Ice Hockey Hall of Fame as a player.

== Career statistics ==
=== Regular season and playoffs ===
			Regular season					Playoffs
Season	Team	League	GP	G	A	Pts	PIM	GP	G	A	Pts	PIM
1982–83	Kölner Haie	1.GBun	11	0	0	0	0	—	—	—	—	—
1983–84	Kölner Haie	1.GBun	26	0	4	4	22	—	—	—	—	—
1984–85	Kölner Haie	1.GBun	31	7	7	14	24	9	4	1	5	12
1985–86	Kölner Haie	1.GBun	35	6	18	24	83	10	4	3	7	0
1986–87	Rochester Americans	AHL	42	3	19	22	50	17	1	11	12	16
1986–87	Buffalo Sabres	NHL	26	1	4	5	23	—	—	—	—	—
1987–88	Buffalo Sabres	NHL	75	2	9	11	151	6	0	0	0	15
1988–89	Buffalo Sabres	NHL	70	5	13	18	55	5	0	1	1	4
1989–90	Buffalo Sabres	NHL	74	3	20	23	85	6	0	0	0	4
1990–91	Buffalo Sabres	NHL	74	12	32	44	66	6	1	1	2	6
1991–92	Buffalo Sabres	NHL	8	2	0	2	6	—	—	—	—	—
1991–92	New York Islanders	NHL	59	6	29	35	43	—	—	—	—	—
1992–93	New York Islanders	NHL	80	9	29	38	67	18	1	5	6	12
1993–94	New York Islanders	NHL	41	7	14	21	30	4	0	1	1	4
1994–95	EV Landshut	DEL	5	1	2	3	6	—	—	—	—	—
1994–95	Quebec Nordiques	NHL	44	6	17	23	20	5	0	2	2	2
1995–96	Colorado Avalanche	NHL	6	0	3	3	4	22	4	12	16	33
1996–97	Colorado Avalanche	NHL	60	4	17	21	48	—	—	—	—	—
1997–98	Colorado Avalanche	NHL	78	9	22	31	38	7	0	1	1	4
1998–99	Detroit Red Wings	NHL	22	3	2	5	6	—	—	—	—	—
2001–02	Detroit Red Wings	NHL	8	0	1	1	8	2	0	0	0	2
2002–03	Atlanta Thrashers	NHL	4	0	0	0	10	—	—	—	—	—
1.GBun totals			103	13	29	42	129	19	8	4	12	12
NHL totals			729	69	212	281	660	81	6	23	29	86

=== International ===
Year	Team	Event	Result	GP	G	A	Pts	PIM
1983	West Germany	EJC	5th	5	3	4	7	2
1983	West Germany	WJC	7th	7	0	0	0	0
1985	West Germany	WJC	7th	7	0	1	1	8
1986	West Germany	WC	7th	3	2	1	3	2
1990	West Germany	WC	7th	2	0	0	0	2
1998	Germany	OG	9th	2	0	2	2	4
Junior totals				19	3	5	8	10
Senior totals				7	2	3	5	8
