= Alexei Gusarov =

Russian ice hockey player (born 1964)

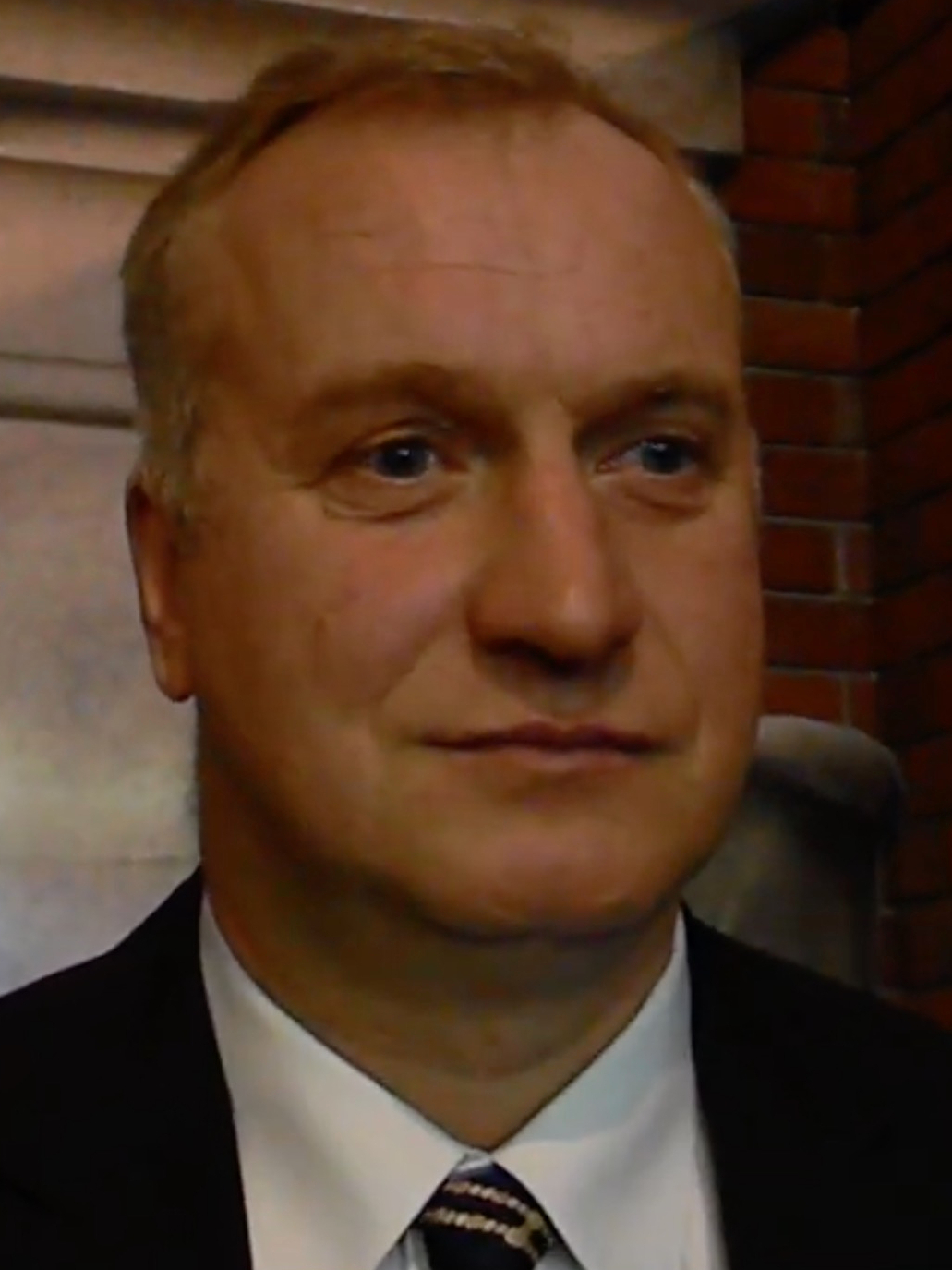
- Gusarov in 2012
- Born: July 8, 1964 (age 61) Leningrad, Russian SFSR, Soviet Union
- Height: 6 ft 2 in (188 cm)
- Weight: 183 lb (83 kg; 13 st 1 lb)
- Position: Defence
- Shot: Left
- Played for: SKA Leningrad; CSKA Moscow; Quebec Nordiques; Colorado Avalanche; New York Rangers; St. Louis Blues
- National team: Soviet Union and Russia
- NHL draft: 213th overall, 1988; Quebec Nordiques
- Playing career: 1981–2001

Alexei Vasilievich Gusarov (Russian: Алексей Васильевич Гусаров; born July 8, 1964) is a Russian former ice hockey defenceman. He played for the Quebec Nordiques, Colorado Avalanche, New York Rangers and St. Louis Blues. Gusarov and Valeri Kamensky were the first Russian-born players to achieve the Triple Gold Club, along with being one of the first 10 members in the Triple Gold Club. He reached this level while with the Colorado Avalanche in 1996.

== Playing career ==
Born in Leningrad (now St. Petersburg), Gusarov was a veteran of the Soviet national team before playing in the NHL. He won the Stanley Cup with the Colorado Avalanche in 1996. He is a member of the Triple Gold Club, having won the 1989 IIHF World Championship, the 1996 Stanley Cup, and the Olympic gold medal in 1988.

Standing 6'2" and weighing in at 183 lb (83 kg), Gusarov was selected 213th overall by Quebec Nordiques in the 1988 NHL entry draft.

== Retirement ==
After his playing career ended, Gusarov retired to Colorado, where he started coaching the AAA hockey club Evolution. He returned to Russia in 2011, first serving as an assistant general manager for SKA Saint Petersburg before moving to HC Sochi of the KHL as an assistant coach from 2014 to 2017.

Gusarov returned to Colorado, and accepted a role in scouting for the Avalanche from the 2018–19 season.

== Career statistics ==
=== Regular season and playoffs ===
			Regular season					Playoffs
Season	Team	League	GP	G	A	Pts	PIM	GP	G	A	Pts	PIM
1980–81	HK VIFK	USSR III	2	0	0	0	0	—	—	—	—	—
1981–82	SKA Leningrad	USSR	20	1	2	3	16	—	—	—	—	—
1981–82	HK VIFK	USSR III	20	0	0	0	8	—	—	—	—	—
1982–83	SKA Leningrad	USSR	42	2	1	3	32	—	—	—	—	—
1983–84	SKA Leningrad	USSR	43	2	3	5	32	—	—	—	—	—
1984–85	CSKA Moscow	USSR	36	3	2	5	26	—	—	—	—	—
1985–86	CSKA Moscow	USSR	40	3	5	8	30	—	—	—	—	—
1986–87	CSKA Moscow	USSR	38	4	7	11	24	—	—	—	—	—
1987–88	CSKA Moscow	USSR	39	3	2	5	28	—	—	—	—	—
1988–89	CSKA Moscow	USSR	42	5	4	9	37	—	—	—	—	—
1989–90	CSKA Moscow	USSR	42	4	7	11	42	—	—	—	—	—
1990–91	CSKA Moscow	USSR	15	0	0	0	12	—	—	—	—	—
1990–91	Quebec Nordiques	NHL	36	3	9	12	12	—	—	—	—	—
1990–91	Halifax Citadels	AHL	2	0	3	3	2	—	—	—	—	—
1991–92	Halifax Citadels	AHL	3	0	0	0	0	—	—	—	—	—
1991–92	Quebec Nordiques	NHL	68	5	18	23	22	—	—	—	—	—
1992–93	Quebec Nordiques	NHL	79	8	22	30	57	5	0	1	1	0
1993–94	Quebec Nordiques	NHL	76	5	20	25	38	—	—	—	—	—
1994–95	Quebec Nordiques	NHL	14	1	2	3	6	—	—	—	—	—
1995–96	Colorado Avalanche	NHL	65	5	15	20	56	21	0	9	9	12
1996–97	Colorado Avalanche	NHL	58	2	12	14	28	17	0	3	3	14
1997–98	Colorado Avalanche	NHL	72	4	10	14	42	7	0	1	1	6
1998–99	Colorado Avalanche	NHL	54	3	10	13	24	5	0	0	0	2
1999–2000	Colorado Avalanche	NHL	34	2	2	4	10	—	—	—	—	—
2000–01	Colorado Avalanche	NHL	9	0	1	1	6	—	—	—	—	—
2000–01	New York Rangers	NHL	26	1	3	4	6	—	—	—	—	—
2000–01	St. Louis Blues	NHL	16	0	4	4	6	13	0	0	0	4
USSR totals			357	27	33	60	279	—	—	—	—	—
NHL totals			607	39	128	167	313	68	0	14	14	38

Olympic medal record

Men's ice hockey
Gold medal – first place	1988 Calgary	Team
Silver medal – second place	1998 Nagano	Team

=== International ===
Year	Team	Event	Place	GP	G	A	Pts	PIM
1982	Soviet Union	EJC	1st place, gold medalist(s)	5	1	1	2	6
1984	Soviet Union	WJC	1st place, gold medalist(s)	7	4	5	9	8
1984	Soviet Union	CC	SF	2	0	0	0	4
1985	Soviet Union	WC	3rd place, bronze medalist(s)	10	2	1	3	6
1986	Soviet Union	WC	1st place, gold medalist(s)	9	1	2	3	8
1987	Soviet Union	WC	2nd place, silver medalist(s)	10	1	2	3	8
1987	Soviet Union	CC	2nd place, silver medalist(s)	6	1	1	2	6
1988	Soviet Union	OG	1st place, gold medalist(s)	8	1	3	4	6
1989	Soviet Union	WC	1st place, gold medalist(s)	9	2	1	3	2
1990	Soviet Union	WC	1st place, gold medalist(s)	10	1	3	4	6
1991	Soviet Union	WC	3rd place, bronze medalist(s)	10	1	4	5	2
1991	Soviet Union	CC	5th	5	0	2	2	0
1998	Russia	OG	2nd place, silver medalist(s)	6	0	1	1	8
Junior totals				12	5	6	11	14
Senior totals				85	10	20	30	56

== Awards and honors ==
Award	Year
NHL
Stanley Cup	1996
