= Charlie Lyons =

American media executive

Charlie Lyons is an American media executive and a producer of motion pictures, television, and stage. He is the managing partner of Holding Pictures and a partner in Beacon Communications. Lyons' film and stage enterprises have generated over two billion dollars in revenue and worldwide critical acclaim. He is a business partner and advisor to Kevin Costner and TIG Productions. He is also a frequent collaborator with Harrison Ford Productions.

Lyons and his companies have produced dozens of films, including Air Force One, The Water Horse, Open Range, The Guardian, Spy Game, The Family Man, Firewall, Raising Helen, A Lot Like Love, The Hurricane and Thirteen Days. Lyons executive produces and guides the multi-platform Bring It On Franchise. He was producer and presenter of Bring It On The Musical, which toured throughout the United States and overseas. Bring It On had a Broadway engagement at the Historic St. James Theater and was nominated for two Tony Awards, including Best Musical, and five Drama Desk Awards.

Lyons is the founder and past chairman / CEO of Ascent Entertainment Group Inc., a global media company. In 1990, Lyons was hired to lead the turnaround of a division of Comsat Corporation. He built the division into a public company to include On Command Corporation (the largest worldwide hotel VOD cable, satellite and Internet network), Ascent Network Services (the broadcast provider for NBC), the NBA's Denver Nuggets, the NHL's Colorado Avalanche, Colorado Studios (later known as HDNet) and Beacon Communications.

Ascent developed and financed the Pepsi Center, home to over 200 live events annually. In May 1995, Ascent acquired the Quebec Nordiques and relocated the team to Denver. The franchise was renamed the Colorado Avalanche. In 1996, they won the Stanley Cup, bringing the city its first world championship. The Avalanche won eight division titles, an NHL record, and qualified for the playoffs 10 years in a row. They hold an all-time NHL record for consecutive sellouts at home (487).

In the 1980s Lyons held numerous executive positions for the Marriott Corporation.

Lyons began his career as an aide to Vice President of the United States Nelson A. Rockefeller. He worked with the Hon. William D. Rogers to finalize the Panama Canal Treaties. He has served on corporate and charitable boards, including the National Basketball Association, the Women's National Basketball Association, National Hockey League, National Jewish Hospital and Gallaudet University. Lyons is a graduate of Washington University in St. Louis, and completed the SMM Executive Program at Harvard Business School. He is an instrument-rated pilot.
