= Dave Hannan =

Ice hockey player

- Born: November 26, 1961 (age 64) Onaping Falls, Ontario, Canada
- Height: 5 ft 11 in (180 cm)
- Weight: 170 lb (77 kg; 12 st 2 lb)
- Position: Left wing
- Shot: Left
- Played for: Pittsburgh Penguins; Edmonton Oilers; Toronto Maple Leafs; Buffalo Sabres; Colorado Avalanche; Ottawa Senators
- National team: Canada
- NHL draft: 196th overall, 1981; Pittsburgh Penguins
- Playing career: 1981–1997

David Patrick Hannan (born November 26, 1961) is a Canadian former professional hockey left winger who played 16 seasons in the National Hockey League with the Pittsburgh Penguins, Edmonton Oilers, Toronto Maple Leafs, Buffalo Sabres, Colorado Avalanche and Ottawa Senators. He is a two-time winner of the Stanley Cup, with Edmonton in 1988 and with Colorado in 1996.

== Playing career ==
Hannan's junior hockey career was divided between the Windsor Spitfires, Sault Ste. Marie Greyhounds, and Brantford Alexanders. He was drafted in the 10th round (196th overall) of the 1981 NHL entry draft by the Pittsburgh Penguins. His best statistical season in the NHL was 1985–86, in which he recorded 35 points in 75 games with the Pittsburgh Penguins. He is perhaps best remembered for a goal he scored while a member of the Buffalo Sabres. On April 27, 1994, during the fourth overtime of a scoreless game six of a playoff series at the Buffalo Memorial Auditorium, he backhanded a shot past New Jersey's Martin Brodeur to force game seven in New Jersey. Hannan's final NHL season was 1996–97, in which he played 34 games with the Ottawa Senators before retiring.

== Career statistics ==
=== Regular season and playoffs ===
			Regular season					Playoffs
Season	Team	League	GP	G	A	Pts	PIM	GP	G	A	Pts	PIM
1977–78	Windsor Spitfires	OMJHL	68	14	16	30	43	6	0	1	1	2
1978–79	Sault Ste. Marie Greyhounds	OMJHL	26	7	8	15	13	—	—	—	—	—
1979–80	Sault Ste. Marie Greyhounds	OMJHL	28	11	10	21	31	—	—	—	—	—
1979–80	Brantford Alexanders	OMJHL	25	5	10	15	26	10	2	6	8	23
1980–81	Brantford Alexanders	OHL	56	46	35	81	155	6	2	4	6	20
1981–82	Erie Blades	AHL	76	33	37	70	129	—	—	—	—	—
1981–82	Pittsburgh Penguins	NHL	1	0	0	0	0	—	—	—	—	—
1982–83	Baltimore Skipjacks	AHL	5	2	2	4	13	—	—	—	—	—
1982–83	Pittsburgh Penguins	NHL	74	11	22	33	127	—	—	—	—	—
1983–84	Baltimore Skipjacks	AHL	47	18	24	42	98	10	2	6	8	27
1983–84	Pittsburgh Penguins	NHL	24	2	3	5	33	—	—	—	—	—
1984–85	Baltimore Skipjacks	AHL	49	20	25	45	91	—	—	—	—	—
1984–85	Pittsburgh Penguins	NHL	30	6	7	13	43	—	—	—	—	—
1985–86	Pittsburgh Penguins	NHL	75	17	18	35	91	—	—	—	—	—
1986–87	Pittsburgh Penguins	NHL	58	10	15	25	56	—	—	—	—	—
1987–88	Pittsburgh Penguins	NHL	21	4	3	7	23	—	—	—	—	—
1987–88	Edmonton Oilers	NHL	51	9	11	20	43	12	1	1	2	8
1988–89	Pittsburgh Penguins	NHL	72	10	20	30	157	8	0	1	1	4
1989–90	Toronto Maple Leafs	NHL	39	6	9	15	55	3	1	0	1	4
1990–91	Toronto Maple Leafs	NHL	74	11	23	34	82	—	—	—	—	—
1991–92	Toronto Maple Leafs	NHL	35	2	2	4	16	—	—	—	—	—
1991–92	Buffalo Sabres	NHL	12	2	4	6	48	7	2	0	2	2
1991–92	Canada	Intl	3	0	0	0	2	—	—	—	—	—
1992–93	Buffalo Sabres	NHL	55	5	15	20	43	8	1	1	2	18
1993–94	Buffalo Sabres	NHL	83	6	15	21	53	7	1	0	1	6
1994–95	Buffalo Sabres	NHL	42	4	12	16	32	5	0	2	2	2
1995–96	Buffalo Sabres	NHL	57	6	10	16	30	—	—	—	—	—
1995–96	Colorado Avalanche	NHL	4	1	0	1	2	13	0	2	2	2
1996–97	Ottawa Senators	NHL	34	2	2	4	8	—	—	—	—	—
AHL totals			177	73	88	161	331	10	2	6	8	27
NHL totals			841	114	191	305	942	63	6	7	13	46

Medal record

Representing Canada

Ice hockey

Olympic Games
Silver medal – second place	1992 Albertville	

=== International ===
Year	Team	Event	Result	GP	G	A	Pts	PIM
1992	Canada	OG	2nd place, silver medalist(s)	8	3	5	8	8
Senior totals				8	3	5	8	8

== Awards and honors ==
Award	Year
NHL
Stanley Cup (Edmonton Oilers)	1988
Stanley Cup (Colorado Avalanche)	1996
