= Jean Colbert Martineau =

Jean Colbert Martineau (died September 5, 1995) was a pioneering radio broadcaster and radio show host. She interviewed many prominent people as host of "The Jean Colbert Show" six days a week on WTIC in Hartford, Connecticut.

She was born in New York City and studied at Hunter College. She worked as a radio actress early in her career. From 1943 until 1946 she worked for WTAM in Cleveland, Ohio.

She interviewed Gerda Ring. She interviewed First Ladies Eleanor Roosevelt and Pat Nixon. She interviewed female family members of the U.S. Ambassador to Spain. She interviewed Philip Evergood in 1960. She was the first interviewer of Helen Keller, and the only American broadcaster to interview the Finnish composer Jean Sibelius. Other prominent interviewees include Winston Churchill, Katharine Hepburn, Richard Burton, Queen Elizabeth, Albert Einstein, Arthur Fiedler, Lucille Ball, Marilyn Monroe, Elizabeth Taylor, Grace Kelly, Prince Rainier, Alfred Hitchcock, Liberace, Gregory Peck, Joe DiMaggio, the Duke of Windsor, Fidel Castro, Adlai Stevenson, and presidents Harry Truman and Lyndon Johnson.

She married naval officer David L. Martineau.
