= Scott Young (ice hockey, born 1967) =

American ice hockey player

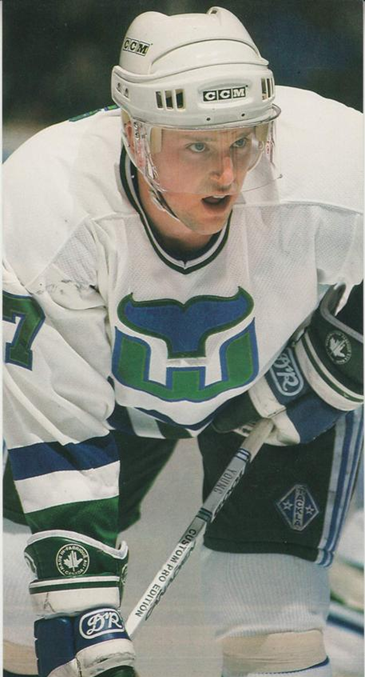
- Born: October 1, 1967 (age 58) Clinton, Massachusetts, U.S.
- Height: 6 ft 0 in (183 cm)
- Weight: 190 lb (86 kg; 13 st 8 lb)
- Position: Right wing
- Shot: Right
- Played for: Hartford Whalers; Pittsburgh Penguins; HC Bolzano; Quebec Nordiques; Frankfurt Lions; Landshut EV; Colorado Avalanche; Mighty Ducks of Anaheim; St. Louis Blues; Dallas Stars
- National team: United States
- NHL draft: 11th overall, 1986; Hartford Whalers
- Playing career: 1988–2006

Scott Allen Young (born October 1, 1967) is an American professional ice hockey coach and former player who most recently served as an assistant coach for the Vancouver Canucks of the National Hockey League (NHL). Young previously served as director of player development for the Canucks as well as for the Pittsburgh Penguins.

He is a two-time Stanley Cup champion, winning in 1991 with the Pittsburgh Penguins and 1996 with the Colorado Avalanche. He also played with the Hartford Whalers, Quebec Nordiques, Mighty Ducks of Anaheim, St. Louis Blues and Dallas Stars.

== Playing career ==
Young gained attention as a star hockey player while still in high school. He played his prep school hockey at St. Mark's School in Southborough, Massachusetts, playing with teammates that included fellow future-NHL players Doug and Greg Brown. His play allowed him to play with the United States in the World Junior Ice Hockey Championship in 1985, the beginning of a long international career representing the United States. Following the championship Young went to play for the Boston University Terriers. He played there two years, winning rookie of the year honors in 1986. Young was also drafted by the Hartford Whalers in the first round, 11th overall in the 1986 NHL entry draft while still in college.

For the 1987–88 season, Young spent the majority of the season with the U.S. National team. In addition to playing on the national team Young played in the 1988 Winter Olympics and made his debut with the Whalers, playing in seven games. The following season he played full-time with the Whalers, scoring 59 points in 79 games. Young played one more full season with the Whalers and played half of the 1990–91 season with the Whalers before being traded to the Pittsburgh Penguins. Young helped the Penguins win the Stanley Cup in 1991.

For the 1991–92 season Young spent the majority of the year playing in Italy in addition to a brief stint with the U.S. National Team and representing the U.S. in the 1992 Winter Olympics. Prior to 1992–93 season Young returned to the NHL and was traded by the Penguins to the Quebec Nordiques. He played three seasons with the Nordiques and remained on the team when they moved to Colorado and became the Colorado Avalanche. He played two seasons with the Avalanche and won his second Stanley Cup with the Avalanche in 1996. Prior to the 1997–98 season, Young was traded to the Mighty Ducks of Anaheim and played one season with the Ducks. The next offseason Young signed with the St. Louis Blues.

In his first stint with the Blues he played four seasons, enjoying the best season of his career in the 2000–01 season, scoring 73 points and 40 goals, both career highs and the only time Young attained 40 goals in a season. Young also represented the U.S. in the 2002 Winter Olympics. Prior to the 2002–03 season Young signed with the Dallas Stars and played two years with them. Following the 2004–05 NHL lockout that canceled the cancelled 2004–05 season, Young rejoined the Blues for the 2005–06 campaign. While the Blues finished last in the league that year, Young proved that he was still a strong hockey player, leading the team with 49 points. Following the season, Young retired from hockey. Young finished his career with 1181 career NHL games, 342 goals and 414 assists for 756 points.

== Post-retirement ==
In 2011, Young returned to St. Mark's School in Southborough, Massachusetts, as the coach of the boys' varsity team for which he once played. As a coach, Young had three winning seasons, two Barber Tournament championships and two Boys' Holiday Showcase championships. The St. Mark's team he helped build won the NEPSAC Small School Championships in 2015 and 2016.

Scott returned to his college alma mater Boston University Terriers as director of hockey operations in 2014. In September 2015, he was promoted to assistant ice hockey coach on head coach David Quinn's staff.

Young was enshrined as a member of the United States Hockey Hall of Fame as part of the Class of 2017. On July 28, 2017 he was appointed director of player development for the NHL's Pittsburgh Penguins.

On June 24, 2022, the Vancouver Canucks appointed Young as Director of Player Personnel. On June 5, 2025, Young was promoted to assistant coach as part of Adam Foote's coaching staff. On May 19, 2026, the Canucks fired Foote and his coaching staff, including Young, after the team finished the season in last place with a 25–49–8 record.

== Career statistics ==
=== Regular season and playoffs ===
			Regular season					Playoffs
Season	Team	League	GP	G	A	Pts	PIM	GP	G	A	Pts	PIM
1984–85	St. Mark's School	HS-Prep	23	28	41	69	—	—	—	—	—	—
1985–86	Boston University	HE	38	16	13	29	31	—	—	—	—	—
1986–87	Boston University	HE	33	15	21	36	24	—	—	—	—	—
1987–88	United States National Team	Intl	56	11	47	58	31	—	—	—	—	—
1987–88	Hartford Whalers	NHL	7	0	0	0	2	4	1	0	1	0
1988–89	Hartford Whalers	NHL	76	19	40	59	27	4	2	0	2	4
1989–90	Hartford Whalers	NHL	80	24	40	64	47	7	2	0	2	2
1990–91	Hartford Whalers	NHL	34	6	9	15	8	—	—	—	—	—
1990–91	Pittsburgh Penguins	NHL	43	11	16	27	33	17	1	6	7	2
1991–92	United States National Team	Intl	10	2	4	6	21	—	—	—	—	—
1991–92	HC Bolzano	ITA	18	22	17	39	6	5	4	3	7	7
1992–93	Quebec Nordiques	NHL	82	30	30	60	20	6	4	1	5	0
1993–94	Quebec Nordiques	NHL	76	26	25	51	14	—	—	—	—	—
1994–95	Frankfurt Lions	DEL	1	1	0	1	0	—	—	—	—	—
1994–95	Landshut EV	DEL	4	6	1	7	6	—	—	—	—	—
1994–95	Quebec Nordiques	NHL	48	18	21	39	14	6	3	3	6	2
1995–96	Colorado Avalanche	NHL	81	21	39	60	50	22	3	12	15	10
1996–97	Colorado Avalanche	NHL	72	18	19	37	14	17	4	2	6	14
1997–98	Mighty Ducks of Anaheim	NHL	73	13	20	33	22	—	—	—	—	—
1998–99	St. Louis Blues	NHL	75	24	28	52	27	13	4	7	11	10
1999–00	St. Louis Blues	NHL	74	24	15	39	18	6	6	2	8	8
2000–01	St. Louis Blues	NHL	81	40	33	73	30	15	6	7	13	2
2001–02	St. Louis Blues	NHL	67	19	21	40	26	10	3	0	3	2
2002–03	Dallas Stars	NHL	79	23	19	42	30	10	4	3	7	6
2003–04	Dallas Stars	NHL	53	8	8	16	14	4	1	0	1	2
2004–05	Memphis Riverkings	CHL	3	2	1	3	0	—	—	—	—	—
2005–06	St. Louis Blues	NHL	79	18	31	49	52	—	—	—	—	—
NHL totals			1,181	342	414	756	448	141	44	43	87	64

=== International ===
Medal record

Men's ice hockey

Representing the United States

Winter Olympics
Silver medal – second place	2002 Salt Lake City	

World Junior Championships
Bronze medal – third place	1986 Hamilton	

Year	Team	Event	Result	GP	G	A	Pts	PIM
1985	United States	WJC	6th	7	1	2	3	4
1986	United States	WJC	3rd place, bronze medalist(s)	7	1	3	4	8
1987	United States	WJC	4th	7	7	4	11	2
1987	United States	WC	7th	4	0	1	1	2
1988	United States	OG	7th	6	2	6	8	4
1989	United States	WC	6th	10	0	7	7	6
1992	United States	OG	4th	8	0	1	1	2
1994	United States	WC	4th	8	3	1	4	4
1996	United States	WCH	1st place, gold medalist(s)	7	2	2	4	4
2002	United States	OG	2nd place, silver medalist(s)	6	4	0	4	2
Junior totals				21	9	9	18	14
Senior totals				49	11	18	29	24

== Awards and honors ==
Award	Year	Ref
College
Hockey East Rookie of the Year	1986	
NHL
Stanley Cup champion	1991, 1996	
International
WJC All-Star Team	1987	
USA Hockey
Hockey Hall of Fame	2017	

== See also ==
- List of NHL players with 1,000 games played

Awards and achievements
Preceded by Ken Hodge Jr.	Hockey East Rookie of the Year; 1985–86; With: Al Loring	Succeeded by Brian Leetch
Sporting positions
Preceded by Dana Murzyn	Hartford Whalers first-round draft pick 1986	Succeeded by Jody Hull
