= Sylvain Lefebvre =

Canadian ice hockey player (born 1967)

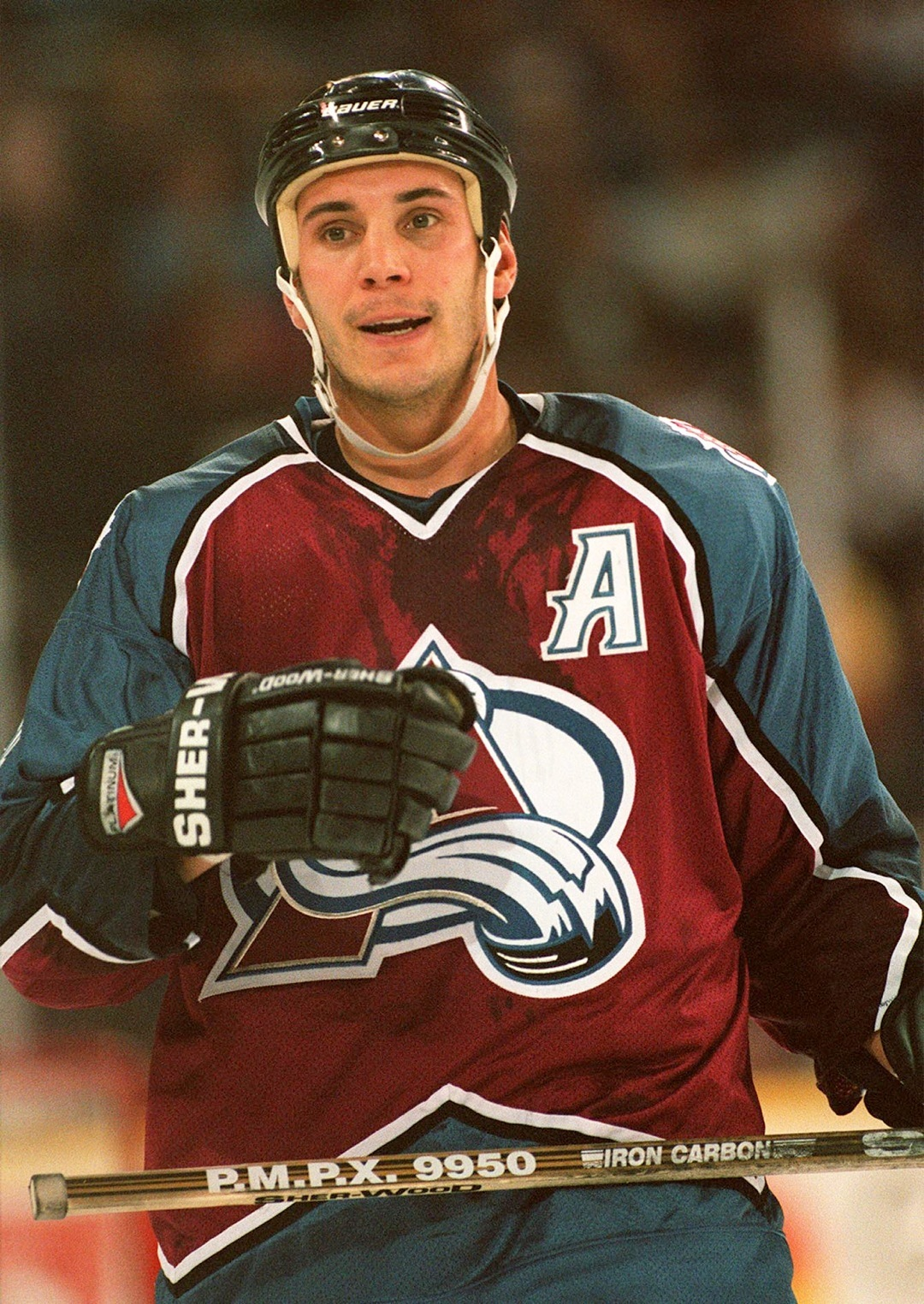
- Born: 14 October 1967 (age 58) Richmond, Quebec, Canada
- Height: 6 ft 2 in (188 cm)
- Weight: 204 lb (93 kg; 14 st 8 lb)
- Position: Defence
- Shot: Left
- Played for: Montreal Canadiens; Toronto Maple Leafs; Quebec Nordiques; Colorado Avalanche; New York Rangers; SC Bern
- NHL draft: Undrafted
- Playing career: 1987–2004

Sylvain Jean Lefebvre (luh-FAYV; born October 14, 1967) is a Canadian professional ice hockey coach and former player who currently serves as an assistant coach for the Florida Panthers of the National Hockey League (NHL). Originally undrafted by teams in the NHL, he played for five franchises between 1989 to 2003 and won the Stanley Cup with the Colorado Avalanche in 1996. As a coach, he won the Stanley Cup with the Florida Panthers in 2024 and 2025.

== Playing career ==
Originally an undrafted free agent, Lefebvre signed with the Montreal Canadiens in 1986 and made the team's roster thereafter beginning in 1989–90. He played a total of three seasons with Montreal before being traded to the Toronto Maple Leafs in exchange for a 1994 third round draft pick prior to the start of the 1992–93 season.

After two seasons with the Leafs, Lefebvre was traded to the Quebec Nordiques as part of the Wendel Clark-Mats Sundin deal on June 28, 1994. He would play the next five seasons with the Quebec Nordiques/Colorado Avalanche, including a 1996 Stanley Cup victory, before signing a four-year, $10-million US contract with the New York Rangers (that secured a club option for him to play a fifth season at $3-million) during the 1999 offseason.

Seeing a decrease in productivity after several injuries, including a shattered index finger which occurred while blocking a shot, Lefebvre's career-low in points came in the 2002–03 season where he managed just two points over 35 games played. After four years with the Rangers, Lefebvre left the NHL and decided to join old friend Sebastien Bordeleau for one season with Swiss-based SC Bern of the Nationalliga A where he and his team won the league championship prior to his retirement from active play.

== Coaching career ==
On June 4, 2009, the Colorado Avalanche announced that Lefebvre would serve as an assistant coach of the team's American Hockey League (AHL) affiliate, the Lake Erie Monsters.

In June 2012, Lefebvre became the head coach of the Hamilton Bulldogs, the AHL affiliate of the Montreal Canadiens. Following the Canadiens' purchase and subsequent relocation of the Bulldogs franchise to become the second iteration of the St. John's IceCaps in 2015, Lefebvre was kept on as head coach. In 2017, the Canadiens' AHL franchise was again relocated, becoming the Laval Rocket, whereas Lefebvre remained with the team. After finishing with the worst record in the AHL during the team's inaugural 2017–18 season, Lefebvre was relieved of his head coaching duties in April 2018.

Lefebvre then spent three seasons with the AHL's San Diego Gulls as an assistant coach before, in June 2021, it was announced that he accepted a promotion to the NHL as assistant coach with the Columbus Blue Jackets. However, this ultimately fell through with Lefebvre being replaced on September 13, 2021, due to his decision not to get a COVID-19 vaccine.

Prior to the beginning of the 2022–23 NHL season, Lefebvre was named as an assistant coach for the Florida Panthers. In 2024, Lefebvre won the Stanley Cup for the second time in his career, the first within his coaching capacity. He won it again with the team in 2025.

== Personal life ==
After winning the Stanley Cup with the Colorado Avalanche in 1996, Lefebvre was involved in an incident that attracted media attention. As part of tradition, each player on the winning team can take personal possession of the trophy for a day during the summer following the championship series, a practice that has led to several misadventures. When it was his turn, Lefebvre decided to have his daughter baptized in it.

== Career statistics ==
=== Regular season and playoffs ===
			Regular season					Playoffs
Season	Team	League	GP	G	A	Pts	PIM	GP	G	A	Pts	PIM
1984–85	Laval Voisins	QMJHL	66	7	5	12	31	—	—	—	—	—
1985–86	Laval Titan	QMJHL	71	8	17	25	48	14	1	0	1	25
1986–87	Laval Titan	QMJHL	70	10	36	46	44	15	1	6	7	12
1986–87	Sherbrooke Canadiens	AHL	—	—	—	—	—	1	0	0	0	0
1987–88	Sherbrooke Canadiens	AHL	79	3	24	27	73	6	2	3	5	4
1988–89	Sherbrooke Canadiens	AHL	77	15	32	47	119	6	1	3	4	4
1989–90	Montreal Canadiens	NHL	68	3	10	13	61	6	0	0	0	2
1990–91	Montreal Canadiens	NHL	63	5	18	23	30	11	1	0	1	6
1991–92	Montreal Canadiens	NHL	69	3	14	17	91	2	0	0	0	2
1992–93	Toronto Maple Leafs	NHL	81	2	12	14	90	21	3	3	6	20
1993–94	Toronto Maple Leafs	NHL	84	2	9	11	79	18	0	3	3	16
1994–95	Quebec Nordiques	NHL	48	2	11	13	17	6	0	2	2	2
1995–96	Colorado Avalanche	NHL	75	5	11	16	49	22	0	5	5	12
1996–97	Colorado Avalanche	NHL	71	2	11	13	30	17	0	0	0	25
1997–98	Colorado Avalanche	NHL	81	0	10	10	48	7	0	0	0	4
1998–99	Colorado Avalanche	NHL	76	2	18	20	48	19	0	1	1	12
1999–00	New York Rangers	NHL	82	2	10	12	43	—	—	—	—	—
2000–01	New York Rangers	NHL	71	2	13	15	55	—	—	—	—	—
2001–02	Hartford Wolf Pack	AHL	15	0	5	5	11	—	—	—	—	—
2001–02	New York Rangers	NHL	41	0	5	5	23	—	—	—	—	—
2002–03	New York Rangers	NHL	35	0	2	2	10	—	—	—	—	—
2003–04	SC Bern	NLA	11	2	4	6	14	15	0	6	6	44
NHL totals			945	30	154	184	674	129	4	14	18	101
