= Jean Martineau (ice hockey) =

Jean Martineau (born July 1, 1961) is currently Senior Vice President, Communications & Business Operations for the Colorado Avalanche of the NHL.

== Early life and education ==
Jean Martineau was raised in a family that was very close to hockey. His father and grandfather were owners of the Quebec Aces of the American Hockey League in the early 1960s. In 1984 he earned his BA in Communications at Université Laval in Sainte-Foy, Quebec.

== Quebec Nordiques ==
Jean Martineau was hired by the Quebec Nordiques in 1986, and only one year later, he was appointed head of the Communications Department.

His knowledge and abilities were evident at a young age. Already the youngest PR Director in the National Hockey League, he was named to the Nordiques Directors Committee at the age of 28. From that point on, Martineau was involved with many projects and special issues within the Nordiques’ organization. He has worked closely with the NHL on many events, including Rendezvous ‘87, Broadcast Coordinator for the 1992 Stanley Cup finals, and helping organize the 1993 Entry Draft, held at the Colisée in Quebec City.

== Colorado Avalanche ==
Jean Martineau stayed with the franchise when they moved to Denver in 1995.

Martineau oversees all aspects of the Avalanche communications and media relations efforts. In addition to his communications responsibilities, Martineau also handles all team services details. In this capacity, he is responsible for making travel arrangements for the club throughout the season and supervising other special events and team functions. He also is the club's liaison for business operations.

In recognition of his leadership and numerous responsibilities, he was named Senior Vice President during the summer of 2003.

== Personal life ==
He currently lives in Parker, Colorado with his wife Brigitte, and their two children, Anthony and Erika. He and his wife became naturalized citizens of the United States in 2008.

== Awards and achievements ==
- 1996 Stanley Cup championship (Colorado)
- 2001 Stanley Cup championship (Colorado)
