= 2000–01 Pittsburgh Penguins season =

NHL team season

2000–01 Pittsburgh Penguins
- Division: 3rd Atlantic
- Conference: 6th Eastern
- 2000–01 record: 42–28–9–3
- Home record: 24–15–2–0
- Road record: 18–13–7–3
- Goals for: 281
- Goals against: 256

Team information
- General manager: Craig Patrick
- Coach: Ivan Hlinka
- Captain: Jaromir Jagr
- Alternate captains: Martin Straka; Bob Boughner
- Arena: Mellon Arena
- Average attendance: 16,277
- Minor league affiliates: Wilkes-Barre/Scranton Penguins; Wheeling Nailers

Team leaders
- Goals: Jaromir Jagr (52)
- Assists: Jaromir Jagr (69)
- Points: Jaromir Jagr (121)
- Penalty minutes: Krzysztof Oliwa (165)
- Plus/minus: Robert Lang (+20)
- Wins: Jean-Sebastien Aubin (20)
- Goals against average: Johan Hedberg (2.64)

The 2000–01 Pittsburgh Penguins season was the team's 34th in the National Hockey League (NHL). The team played 82 games under new head coach Ivan Hlinka, who replaced Herb Brooks, who stepped down to remain a scout with the team. The Penguins' .585 points percentage meant that they were the only NHL team from the 1990–91 season to this one that had a points percentage above .500 every season.

The last remaining active member of the 2000–01 Pittsburgh Penguins was right wing Jaromir Jagr, who played his final NHL game in the 2017–18 season, although he did not play in the NHL during the 2008–09, 2009–10, and 2010–11 seasons. His career is still going on as a member of the Czech Extraliga's Rytiri Kladno.

== Offseason ==
Herb Brooks resigned as head coach at the end of the previous season, but remained with the team as a scout. Ivan Hlinka succeeded Brooks as head coach. Former Penguin Joe Mullen became an assistant coach along with his former teammate Randy Hillier.

== Regular season ==
The Penguins opened the regular season by splitting a two-game series against the Nashville Predators in Japan.

On December 9, 2000, it was announced by owner Mario Lemieux that he intended to come back as a player. Lemieux returned to the ice on December 27, 2000, making Lemieux the first ever owner-player in NHL history. Prior to the game, his number 66 banner was lowered from the rafters of the Mellon Arena with son Austin watching. Lemieux scored a goal and set up two others (including one on his first shift) in the Penguins' 5–0 victory over the Toronto Maple Leafs. Prior to Lemieux's return, the Penguins were 15–14–6–1. After his comeback, the Penguins went 27–14–3–2 for a regular season record of 42–28–9–3 and a third-place finish in the Atlantic Division for a playoff spot. Lemieux however did not take back the capaticy when he returned, which Jaromir Jagr held onto for the entire season. The Penguins were shut out only once all year, which was on October 28th against the New Jersey Devils, the team that scored more goals than Pittsburgh during the regular season. Jagr had a stellar year, leading the team in goals (52), assists (69) and points (121). Alexei Kovalev had a career year, finishing with 44 goals and 51 assists for 95 points. Martin Straka finished second on the team in assists (68) and had 27 goals for 95 points, while Robert Lang had 32 goals and 48 assists for 80 points. In the 43 games he played in after he returned, roughly half the season, Lemieux managed 35 goals and 41 assists for 76 points.

=== Final standings ===
Atlantic Division
No.	CR		GP	W	L	T	OTL	GF	GA	Pts
1	1	**New Jersey Devils**	82	48	19	12	3	295	195	111
2	4	**Philadelphia Flyers**	82	43	25	11	3	240	207	100
3	6	**Pittsburgh Penguins**	82	42	28	9	3	281	256	96
4	10	New York Rangers	82	33	43	5	1	250	290	72
5	15	New York Islanders	82	21	51	7	3	185	268	52

Note: CR = Conference rank; GP = Games played; W = Wins; L = Losses; T = Ties; OTL = Overtime loss; GF = Goals for; GA = Goals against; Pts = Points
Bolded teams qualified for the playoffs.

Eastern Conference
R		Div	GP	W	L	T	OTL	GF	GA	Pts
**1**	**Z-** New Jersey Devils	**AT**	**82**	**48**	**19**	**12**	**3**	**295**	**195**	111
**2**	**Y-** Ottawa Senators	**NE**	**82**	**48**	**21**	**9**	**4**	**274**	**205**	109
**3**	**Y-** Washington Capitals	**SE**	**82**	**41**	**27**	**10**	**4**	**233**	**211**	96
**4**	**X-** Philadelphia Flyers	**AT**	**82**	**43**	**25**	**11**	**3**	**240**	**207**	100
**5**	**X-** Buffalo Sabres	**NE**	**82**	**46**	**30**	**5**	**1**	**218**	**184**	98
**6**	**X-** Pittsburgh Penguins	**AT**	**82**	**42**	**28**	**9**	**3**	**281**	**256**	96
**7**	**X-** Toronto Maple Leafs	**NE**	**82**	**37**	**29**	**11**	**5**	**232**	**207**	90
**8**	**X-** Carolina Hurricanes	**SE**	**82**	**38**	**32**	**9**	**3**	**212**	**225**	88
8.5
9	Boston Bruins	NE	82	36	30	8	8	227	249	88
10	New York Rangers	AT	82	33	43	5	1	250	290	72
11	Montreal Canadiens	NE	82	28	40	8	6	206	232	70
12	Florida Panthers	SE	82	22	38	13	9	200	246	66
13	Atlanta Thrashers	SE	82	23	45	12	2	211	289	60
14	Tampa Bay Lightning	SE	82	24	47	6	5	201	280	59
15	New York Islanders	AT	82	21	51	7	3	185	268	52

Divisions: AT – Atlantic, NE – Northeast, SE – Southeast

Z – Clinched conference; Y – Clinched division; X – Clinched playoff spot

== Playoffs ==
=== Eastern Conference Quarterfinals ===
The Penguins opened the playoffs against the Washington Capitals. It was their sixth meeting in the playoffs. The Penguins were shut out in Game 1, 1–0. Lemieux scored a goal and had an assist in Game 2, which was won by the Penguins, 2–1. Newcomer Johan Hedberg shut out the Capitals in Game 3. The Capitals won Game 4 in overtime, 4–3. However, game-winning goals by Lemieux and Martin Straka in Game 5 and 6 won the series for the Penguins, 4–2.

=== Eastern Conference Semifinals ===
The Penguins played the Buffalo Sabres in the conference semi-finals. The Penguins won Game 1 by the score of 3–0 and Game 2 by the score of 3–1. The Sabres won the next three games, pushing the Penguins to elimination. However, overtime-winning goals by Straka and Darius Kasparaitis in Game 6 and 7 won the series for the Penguins. Game 7 was Dominik Hasek's last game as a Sabre; he would sign with the Detroit Red Wings in the off-season.

=== Eastern Conference Finals ===
The Penguins and the New Jersey Devils split the first two games of the series before the Devils took games three, four, and five to eliminate the Penguins.

== Schedule and results ==
=== Regular season ===
2000–01 regular season
October: 5–4–1–0 (home: 3–4–0–0; road: 2–0–1–0), 11 Points

#	Oct	Visitor	Score	Home	Record	Points	Recap
1	7	Nashville Predators	3–1	Pittsburgh Penguins	0–1–0–0	0	L
2	8	Pittsburgh Penguins	3–1	Nashville Predators	1–1–0–0	2	W
3	13	Tampa Bay Lightning	2–3	Pittsburgh Penguins	2–1–0–0	4	W
4	14	New York Rangers	6–8	Pittsburgh Penguins	3–1–0–0	6	W
5	18	Carolina Hurricanes	3–2	Pittsburgh Penguins	3–2–0–0	6	L
6	19	Pittsburgh Penguins	3–3	Ottawa Senators	3–2–1–0	7	T
7	21	Columbus Blue Jackets	2–5	Pittsburgh Penguins	4–2–1–0	9	W
8	25	Ottawa Senators	3–2	Pittsburgh Penguins	4–3–1–0	9	L
9	27	Pittsburgh Penguins	4–1	New York Rangers	5–3–1–0	11	W
10	28	New Jersey Devils	9–0	Pittsburgh Penguins	5–4–1–0	11	L

November: 6–4–2–1 (home: 3–1–1–0; road: 3–3–1–1), 15 Points

#	Nov	Visitor	Score	Home	Record	Points	Recap
11	1	Pittsburgh Penguins	2–3	San Jose Sharks	5–5–1–0	11	L
12	3	Pittsburgh Penguins	4–2	Vancouver Canucks	6–5–1–0	13	W
13	4	Pittsburgh Penguins	1–1	Calgary Flames	6–5–2–0	14	T
14	8	Philadelphia Flyers	2–5	Pittsburgh Penguins	7–5–2–0	16	W
15	10	Pittsburgh Penguins	4–2	New Jersey Devils	8–5–2–0	18	W
16	11	Edmonton Oilers	2–5	Pittsburgh Penguins	9–5–2–0	20	W
17	13	Pittsburgh Penguins	2–3 OT	Colorado Avalanche	9–5–2–1	21	OTL
18	16	Pittsburgh Penguins	3–4	St. Louis Blues	9–6–2–1	21	L
19	18	Atlanta Thrashers	1–3	Pittsburgh Penguins	10–6–2–1	23	W
20	22	Carolina Hurricanes	3–1	Pittsburgh Penguins	10–7–2–1	23	L
21	24	Pittsburgh Penguins	1–0	Philadelphia Flyers	11–7–2–1	25	W
22	25	Los Angeles Kings	2–2	Pittsburgh Penguins	11–7–3–1	26	T
23	28	Pittsburgh Penguins	1–3	Boston Bruins	11–8–3–1	26	L

December: 6–6–3–0 (home: 2–5–0–0; road: 4–1–3–0), 15 Points

#	Dec	Visitor	Score	Home	Record	Points	Recap
24	1	Pittsburgh Penguins	6–4	Buffalo Sabres	12–8–3–1	28	W
25	2	Buffalo Sabres	3–2	Pittsburgh Penguins	12–9–3–1	28	L
26	5	Pittsburgh Penguins	4–2	Ottawa Senators	13–9–3–1	30	W
27	6	Boston Bruins	3–2	Pittsburgh Penguins	13–10–3–1	30	L
28	9	Pittsburgh Penguins	1–5	Toronto Maple Leafs	13–11–3–1	30	L
29	10	Pittsburgh Penguins	4–3	Detroit Red Wings	14–11–3–1	32	W
30	13	Toronto Maple Leafs	7–4	Pittsburgh Penguins	14–12–3–1	32	L
31	15	Florida Panthers	4–1	Pittsburgh Penguins	14–13–3–1	32	L
32	16	Pittsburgh Penguins	4–4	Montreal Canadiens	14–13–4–1	33	T
33	20	Pittsburgh Penguins	2–2	Florida Panthers	14–13–5–1	34	T
34	21	Pittsburgh Penguins	1–1	Tampa Bay Lightning	14–13–6–1	35	T
35	23	Dallas Stars	8–2	Pittsburgh Penguins	14–14–6–1	35	L
36	26	Pittsburgh Penguins	5–3	Buffalo Sabres	15–14–6–1	37	W
37	27	Toronto Maple Leafs	0–5	Pittsburgh Penguins	16–14–6–1	39	W
38	30	Ottawa Senators	3–5	Pittsburgh Penguins	17–14–6–1	41	W

January: 8–5–0–1 (home: 5–2–0–0; road: 3–3–0–1), 17 Points

#	Jan	Visitor	Score	Home	Record	Points	Recap
39	3	Washington Capitals	2–3	Pittsburgh Penguins	18–14–6–1	43	W
40	5	Montreal Canadiens	4–3	Pittsburgh Penguins	18–15–6–1	43	L
41	8	Pittsburgh Penguins	5–3	Washington Capitals	19–15–6–1	45	W
42	9	Pittsburgh Penguins	2–5	Boston Bruins	19–16–6–1	45	L
43	12	New York Islanders	3–4	Pittsburgh Penguins	20–16–6–1	47	W
44	13	Pittsburgh Penguins	5–6	New York Islanders	20–17–6–1	47	L
45	15	Mighty Ducks of Anaheim	2–3	Pittsburgh Penguins	21–17–6–1	49	W
46	17	Pittsburgh Penguins	4–5	Phoenix Coyotes	21–18–6–1	49	L
47	19	Pittsburgh Penguins	5–6 OT	Dallas Stars	21–18–6–2	50	OTL
48	21	Pittsburgh Penguins	4–0	Chicago Blackhawks	22–18–6–2	52	W
49	24	Montreal Canadiens	1–3	Pittsburgh Penguins	23–18–6–2	54	W
50	27	Atlanta Thrashers	1–5	Pittsburgh Penguins	24–18–6–2	56	W
51	30	Pittsburgh Penguins	6–3	Atlanta Thrashers	25–18–6–2	58	W
52	31	Philadelphia Flyers	5–1	Pittsburgh Penguins	25–19–6–2	58	L

February: 7–3–1–0 (home: 6–1–0–0; road: 1–2–1–0), 15 Points

#	Feb	Visitor	Score	Home	Record	Points	Recap
53	7	Philadelphia Flyers	4–9	Pittsburgh Penguins	26–19–6–2	60	W
54	10	New Jersey Devils	4–5 OT	Pittsburgh Penguins	27–19–6–2	62	W
55	11	Pittsburgh Penguins	2–4	Minnesota Wild	27–20–6–2	62	L
56	14	Minnesota Wild	1–2	Pittsburgh Penguins	28–20–6–2	64	W
57	16	Pittsburgh Penguins	4–4	New Jersey Devils	28–20–7–2	65	T
58	17	Pittsburgh Penguins	3–2 OT	Columbus Blue Jackets	29–20–7–2	67	W
59	19	Colorado Avalanche	5–1	Pittsburgh Penguins	29–21–7–2	67	L
60	21	Florida Panthers	2–3 OT	Pittsburgh Penguins	30–21–7–2	69	W
61	23	New York Rangers	4–6	Pittsburgh Penguins	31–21–7–2	71	W
62	25	New York Islanders	1–6	Pittsburgh Penguins	32–21–7–2	73	W
63	28	Pittsburgh Penguins	2–4	Montreal Canadiens	32–22–7–2	73	L

March: 8–5–2–0 (home: 4–2–1–0; road: 4–3–1–0), 18 Points

#	Mar	Visitor	Score	Home	Record	Points	Recap
64	2	Pittsburgh Penguins	7–5	New York Rangers	33–22–7–2	75	W
65	3	Pittsburgh Penguins	3–4	Washington Capitals	33–23–7–2	75	L
66	7	Washington Capitals	4–3	Pittsburgh Penguins	33–24–7–2	75	L
67	8	Pittsburgh Penguins	5–3	Atlanta Thrashers	34–24–7–2	77	W
68	10	Calgary Flames	3–6	Pittsburgh Penguins	35–24–7–2	79	W
69	12	Pittsburgh Penguins	3–3	New York Rangers	35–24–8–2	80	T
70	14	New York Islanders	3–1	Pittsburgh Penguins	35–25–8–2	80	L
71	16	Pittsburgh Penguins	6–3	Florida Panthers	36–25–8–2	82	W
72	17	Pittsburgh Penguins	1–5	Tampa Bay Lightning	36–26–8–2	82	L
73	20	Boston Bruins	2–2	Pittsburgh Penguins	36–26–9–2	83	T
74	23	Pittsburgh Penguins	3–5	Carolina Hurricanes	36–27–9–2	83	L
75	25	Pittsburgh Penguins	4–2	New Jersey Devils	37–27–9–2	85	W
76	27	Buffalo Sabres	1–4	Pittsburgh Penguins	38–27–9–2	87	W
77	29	Chicago Blackhawks	2–5	Pittsburgh Penguins	39–27–9–2	89	W
78	31	St. Louis Blues	3–5	Pittsburgh Penguins	40–27–9–2	91	W

April: 2–1–0–1 (home: 1–0–0–0; road: 1–1–0–1), 5 Points

#	Apr	Visitor	Score	Home	Record	Points	Recap
79	2	Pittsburgh Penguins	1–4	New York Islanders	40–28–9–2	91	L
80	4	Tampa Bay Lightning	2–4	Pittsburgh Penguins	41–28–9–2	93	W
81	7	Pittsburgh Penguins	3–4 OT	Philadelphia Flyers	41–28–9–3	94	OTL
82	8	Pittsburgh Penguins	6–4	Carolina Hurricanes	42–28–9–3	96	W

Legend: W Win (2 points) L Loss (0 points) T Tie (1 point) OTL Overtime loss (1 point)

=== Playoffs ===
2001 Stanley Cup playoffs
Eastern Conference Quarterfinals vs. (3) Washington Capitals – Penguins win 4–2

Game	Date	Score	Opponent	Series	Recap
1	April 12, 2001	0–1	@ Washington Capitals	Capitals lead 1–0	L
2	April 14, 2001	2–1	@ Washington Capitals	Series tied 1–1	W
3	April 16, 2001	3–0	Washington Capitals	Penguins lead 2–1	W
4	April 18, 2001	3–4 OT	Washington Capitals	Series tied 2–2	L
5	April 21, 2001	2–1	@ Washington Capitals	Penguins lead 3–2	W
6	April 23, 2001	4–3 OT	Washington Capitals	Penguins win 4–2	W

Eastern Conference Semifinals vs. (5) Buffalo Sabres – Penguins win 4–3

Game	Date	Score	Opponent	Series	Recap
1	April 26, 2001	3–0	@ Buffalo Sabres	Penguins lead 1–0	W
2	April 28, 2001	3–1	@ Buffalo Sabres	Penguins lead 2–0	W
3	April 30, 2001	1–4	Buffalo Sabres	Penguins lead 2–1	L
4	May 2, 2001	2–5	Buffalo Sabres	Series tied 2–2	L
5	May 5, 2001	2–3 OT	@ Buffalo Sabres	Sabres lead 3–2	L
6	May 8, 2001	3–2 OT	Buffalo Sabres	Series tied 3–3	W
7	May 10, 2001	3–2 OT	@ Buffalo Sabres	Penguins win 4–3	W

Eastern Conference Finals vs. (1) New Jersey Devils – Devils win 4–1

Game	Date	Score	Opponent	Series	Recap
1	May 12, 2001	1–3	@ New Jersey Devils	Devils lead 1–0	L
2	May 15, 2001	4–2	@ New Jersey Devils	Series tied 1–1	W
3	May 17, 2001	0–3	New Jersey Devils	Devils lead 2–1	L
4	May 19, 2001	0–5	New Jersey Devils	Devils lead 3–1	L
5	May 22, 2001	2–4	@ New Jersey Devils	Devils win 4–1	L

Legend: W Win L Loss

== Player statistics ==
Skaters

Regular season
Player	GP	G	A	Pts	+/−	PIM
Jaromir Jagr	81	52	69	121	19	42
Alex Kovalev	79	44	51	95	12	96
Martin Straka	82	27	68	95	19	38
Robert Lang	82	32	48	80	20	28
Mario Lemieux	43	35	41	76	15	18
Jan Hrdina	78	15	28	43	19	48
Josef Beranek	70	9	14	23	-7	43
Kevin Stevens^{†}	32	8	15	23	-4	55
Hans Jonsson	58	4	18	22	11	22
Janne Laukkanen	50	3	17	20	9	34
Aleksey Morozov	66	5	14	19	-8	6
Darius Kasparaitis	77	3	16	19	11	111
Rene Corbet	43	8	9	17	-3	57
Jiri Slegr^{‡}	42	5	10	15	-9	60
Andrew Ference	36	4	11	15	6	28
Milan Kraft	42	7	7	14	-6	8
Jeff Norton^{‡}	32	2	10	12	8	20
Kip Miller	33	3	8	11	0	6
Roman Simicek^{‡}	29	3	6	9	-5	30
Toby Petersen	12	2	6	8	3	4
Ian Moran	40	3	4	7	5	28
Wayne Primeau^{†}	28	1	6	7	0	54
Marc Bergevin^{†}	36	1	4	5	5	26
Matthew Barnaby^{‡}	47	1	4	5	-7	168
Michal Rozsival	30	1	4	5	3	26
Bob Boughner	58	1	3	4	18	147
Krzysztof Oliwa^{†}	26	1	2	3	-4	131
Billy Tibbetts	29	1	2	3	-2	79
Frantisek Kucera^{†}	7	0	2	2	-2	0
Josef Melichar	18	0	2	2	-5	21
Sven Butenschon^{‡}	5	0	1	1	1	2
Bobby Dollas	5	0	0	0	0	4
Dan Trebil	16	0	0	0	-1	7
Dennis Bonvie	3	0	0	0	-1	0
Greg Crozier	1	0	0	0	0	0
Steve McKenna	34	0	0	0	-4	100
Dan Lacouture	11	0	0	0	0	14
Total		281	500	781	—	1,561

Playoffs
Player	GP	G	A	Pts	+/−	PIM
Mario Lemieux	18	6	11	17	4	4
Martin Straka	18	5	8	13	-1	8
Jaromir Jagr	16	2	10	12	4	18
Alex Kovalev	18	5	5	10	-2	16
Andrew Ference	18	3	7	10	0	16
Robert Lang	16	4	4	8	2	4
Jan Hrdina	18	2	5	7	-4	8
Kevin Stevens	17	3	3	6	-4	20
Aleksey Morozov	18	3	3	6	0	6
Janne Laukkanen	18	2	2	4	6	14
Wayne Primeau	18	1	3	4	-2	2
Darius Kasparaitis	17	1	1	2	-5	26
Josef Beranek	13	0	2	2	1	2
Rene Corbet	17	1	0	1	-5	12
Marc Bergevin	12	0	1	1	2	2
Bob Boughner	18	0	1	1	5	22
Ian Moran	18	0	1	1	-3	4
Krzysztof Oliwa	5	0	0	0	0	16
Hans Jonsson	16	0	0	0	-2	8
Dan Lacouture	5	0	0	0	0	2
Milan Kraft	8	0	0	0	-4	2
Total		38	67	105	—	212

Goaltenders

Regular season
Player	GP	GS	TOI	W	L	T	GA	GAA	SA	SV%	SO	G	A	PIM
Jean-Sebastien Aubin	36	35	2050:06	20	14	1	107	3.13	973	0.890	0	0	1	4
Garth Snow	35	34	2031:43	14	15	4	101	2.98	1014	0.900	3	0	0	8
Johan Hedberg	9	9	544:54	7	1	1	24	2.64	253	0.905	0	0	0	0
Rich Parent	7	4	331:39	1	1	3	17	3.08	150	0.887	0	0	0	0
Total		82	4958:22	42	31	9	249	3.01	2390	0.896	3	0	1	12

Playoffs
Player	GP	GS	TOI	W	L	T	GA	GAA	SA	SV%	SO	G	A	PIM
Johan Hedberg	18	18	1123:04	9	9	0	43	2.30	482	0.911	2	0	0	0
Total		18	1123:58	9	9	0	43	2.30	482	0.911	2	0	0	0

^{†}Denotes player spent time with another team before joining the Penguins. Stats reflect time with the Penguins only.
^{‡}Denotes player was traded mid-season. Stats reflect time with the Penguins only.

== Awards and records ==
- Mario Lemieux became the first person to score 1500 points for the Penguins. He did so in a 5–3 win over Ottawa on December 30.
- Mario Lemieux became the first person to score 900 assists for the Penguins. He did so in a 6–1 win over the New York Islanders on February 25.
- Kevin Stevens set the franchise record for penalty minutes (1023). He broke the previous high of 980 set by Troy Loney in 1993.

=== Awards ===
Type	Award/honor	Recipient	Ref
League (annual)	Art Ross Trophy	Jaromir Jagr	
League (annual)	NHL First All-Star Team	Jaromir Jagr (Right wing)	
League (annual)	NHL Second All-Star Team	Mario Lemieux (Center)	
League (in-season)	NHL All-Star Game selection	Jaromir Jagr (Note: Jagr was voted to the starting lineup, earning more votes than any other player, but he did not play and was replaced by Sergei Samsonov of the Boston Bruins.)	
League (in-season)	NHL All-Star Game selection	Alexei Kovalev	
League (in-season)	NHL All-Star Game selection	Mario Lemieux	
League (in-season)	NHL Player of the Month	Mario Lemieux (January)	
League (in-season)	NHL Player of the Month	Alexei Kovalev (February)	
League (in-season)	NHL Player of the Month	Jaromir Jagr (March)	
League (in-season)	NHL Player of the Week	Alexei Kovalev (November 13)	
League (in-season)	NHL Player of the Week	Jaromir Jagr & Mario Lemieux (January 2)	
League (in-season)	NHL Player of the Week	Alexei Kovalev (February 12)	
Team	A. T. Caggiano Memorial Booster Club Award	Alexei Kovalev	
Team	Aldege "Baz" Bastien Memorial Good Guy Award	Alexei Kovalev	
Team	Bob Johnson Memorial Badger Bob Award	Darius Kasparaitis	
Team	Bob Johnson Memorial Badger Bob Award	Martin Straka	
Team	Leading Scorer Award	Jaromir Jagr	
Team	Michel Briere Memorial Rookie of the Year Trophy	No winner	
Team	Most Valuable Player Award	Mario Lemieux	
Team	Players' Player Award	Martin Straka	
Team	The Edward J. DeBartolo Community Service Award	Bob Boughner	

Broadcaster Mike Lange was also awarded the Foster Hewitt Memorial Award in 2001, thus securing his induction into the broadcaster's wing of the Hockey Hall of Fame.

=== Milestones ===
Regular Season
Player	Milestone	Reached
Roman Simicek	First NHL goal	October 14, 2000
Milan Kraft	First NHL goal	October 14, 2000
Jaromir Jagr	400th career goal	November 13, 2000
Darius Kasparaitis	100th career point	November 25, 2000
Toby Petersen	First NHL goal	December 10, 2000
Jan Hrdina	100th career point	December 16, 2000
Jaromir Jagr	1000th career point	December 30, 2000
Mario Lemieux	1500th career point	December 30, 2000
Marc Bergevin	1000th career game	January 13, 2001
Jaromir Jagr	600th career assist	January 15, 2001
Kevin Stevens	700th career assist	January 19, 2001
Martin Straka	400th career assist	January 27, 2001
Robert Lang	100th career goal	January 30, 2001
Billy Tibbetts	First NHL goal	February 16, 2001
Alexei Kovalev	200th career goal	February 19, 2001
Johan Hedberg	First NHL win	March 16, 2001

Playoffs
Player	Milestone	Reached
Johan Hedberg	First playoff win	April 14, 2001
Jaromir Jagr	100th playoff assist	April 26, 2001
Martin Straka	50th playoff point	May 15, 2001

Making their NHL debuts in 2000–01 as members of the Pittsburgh Penguins were Greg Crozier, Johan Hedberg, Milan Kraft, Josef Melichar, Toby Petersen, Roman Simicek, and Billy Tibbetts.

== Transactions ==
The Penguins were involved in the following transactions from June 11, 2000, the day after the deciding game of the 2000 Stanley Cup Final, through June 9, 2001, the day of the deciding game of the 2001 Stanley Cup Final.

=== Trades ===
Date	Details		Ref
June 25, 2000	To Montreal Canadiens: 4th-round pick in 2000	To Pittsburgh Penguins: 4th-round pick in 2000; 5th-round pick in 2000	
November 14, 2000	To New York Islanders: 9th-round pick in 2001	To Pittsburgh Penguins: Dan Trebil	
December 28, 2000	To St. Louis Blues: Dan Trebil	To Pittsburgh Penguins: Marc Bergevin	
January 13, 2001	To Minnesota Wild: Roman Simicek	To Pittsburgh Penguins: Steve McKenna	
January 14, 2001	To Atlanta Thrashers: Jiri Slegr	To Pittsburgh Penguins: 3rd-round pick in 2001	
January 14, 2001	To Philadelphia Flyers: John Slaney	To Pittsburgh Penguins: Kevin Stevens	
January 14, 2001	To Columbus Blue Jackets: 3rd-round pick in 2001	To Pittsburgh Penguins: Krzysztof Oliwa	
February 1, 2001	To Tampa Bay Lightning: Matthew Barnaby	To Pittsburgh Penguins: Wayne Primeau	
March 12, 2001	To San Jose Sharks: Jeff Norton	To Pittsburgh Penguins: Bobby Dollas; Johan Hedberg	
March 13, 2001	To Edmonton Oilers: Sven Butenschon	To Pittsburgh Penguins: Dan LaCouture	
March 13, 2001	To Columbus Blue Jackets: 6th-round pick in 2001	To Pittsburgh Penguins: Frantisek Kucera	

=== Players acquired ===
Date	Player	Former team	Term	Via	Ref
July 28, 2000	Darcy Verot	Wilkes-Barre/Scranton Penguins (AHL)		Free agency	
August 28, 2000	Trent Cull	Phoenix Coyotes		Free agency	
September 19, 2000	Rich Parent	Ottawa Senators	1-year	Free agency	
September 24, 2000	Kip Miller	Anaheim Mighty Ducks		Free agency	
September 29, 2000	Jason MacDonald	Orlando Solar Bears (IHL)		Free agency	
October 10, 2000	Garth Snow	Wilkes-Barre/Scranton Penguins (AHL)		Free agency	
November 14, 2000	Jeff Norton	San Jose Sharks		Free agency	

=== Players lost ===
Date	Player	New team	Via (Note: In parentheses is the player's free agency group on July 1 if applicable.)	Ref
N/A	Valentin Morozov	HC Lada Togliatti (RSL)	Free agency (UFA)	
June 23, 2000	Jonas Junkka	Columbus Blue Jackets	Expansion draft	
June 23, 2000	Tyler Wright	Columbus Blue Jackets	Expansion draft	
July 2, 2000	Peter Popovic	Boston Bruins	Free agency (III)	
July 4, 2000	Ron Tugnutt	Columbus Blue Jackets	Free agency (III)	
July 18, 2000	Tom O'Connor	Augusta Lynx (ECHL)	Free agency (UFA)	
July 28, 2000	Dan Trebil	New York Islanders	Free agency (VI)	
August 9, 2000	Tyler Moss	Carolina Hurricanes	Free agency (VI)	
August 25, 2000	Pat Falloon	HC Davos (NLA)	Free agency (UFA)	
September 18, 2000	Rob Brown	Chicago Wolves (IHL)	Free agency (III)	
N/A	Tom Chorske	Houston Aeros (IHL)	Free agency (III)	
N/A	J. P. Tessier	Norfolk Admirals (AHL)	Free agency (UFA)	
October 3, 2000	Peter Skudra	Boston Bruins	Free agency (UFA)	
November 15, 2000	Steve Leach	Louisville Panthers (AHL)	Free agency (III)	

=== Signings ===
Date	Player	Term	Contract type	Ref
July 17, 2000	Jan Fadrny		Entry-level	
July 17, 2000	Roman Simicek		Entry-level	
July 17, 2000	Alexander Zevakhin		Entry-level	
July 27, 2000	Chris Kelleher		Re-signing	
July 28, 2000	Sven Butenschon		Re-signing	
July 30, 2000	Janne Laukkanen	3-year	Re-signing	
July 31, 2000	Matthew Barnaby	1-year	Re-signing	
July 31, 2000	Rene Corbet	1-year	Re-signing	
August 3, 2000	Josef Beranek		Re-signing	
August 10, 2000	Dennis Bonvie	1-year	Re-signing	
August 16, 2000	Alexei Morozov		Re-signing	
August 18, 2000	Toby Petersen		Entry-level	
August 28, 2000	Mark Moore		Entry-level	
September 5, 2000	Sebastien Caron		Entry-level	
September 24, 2000	Jean-Sebastien Aubin	1-year	Re-signing	
December 11, 2000	Mario Lemieux	1-year	Re-signing	
June 4, 2001	Darcy Robinson		Entry-level	

=== Other ===
Name	Date	Notes
Ivan Hlinka	June 21, 2000	Promoted to head coach
Joe Mullen	June 21, 2000	Hired as assistant coach
Rick Kehoe	June 21, 2000	Re-signed as assistant coach

== Draft picks ==
The Penguins selected the following players at the 2000 NHL entry draft at the Pengrowth Saddledome in Calgary:

Round	#	Player	Pos	Nationality	College/Junior/Club team (League)
1	18	Brooks Orpik	Defense	United States	Boston College (Hockey East)
2	52	Shane Endicott	Center	Canada	Seattle Thunderbirds (WHL)
3	84	Peter Hamerlik	Goaltender	Slovakia	HK 36 Skalica (Slovakia)
4	124^{[a]}	Michel Ouellet	Right wing	Canada	Rimouski Océanic (QMJHL)
5	146^{[b]}	David Koci	Defense	Czech Republic	Sparta Prague Jr. (Czech Republic)
6	185	Patrick Foley	Left wing	United States	University of New Hampshire (Hockey East)
7	216	Jim Abbott	Left wing	United States	University of New Hampshire (Hockey East)
8	248	Steven Crampton	Right wing	Canada	Moose Jaw Warriors (WHL)
9	273^{[c]}	Roman Simicek	Center	Czech Republic	HPK Hameenlinna (Finland)
9	280	Nick Boucher	Goaltender	Canada	Dartmouth College (ECAC)

Draft notes

- The Pittsburgh Penguins' fourth-round pick went to the Montreal Canadiens as the result of a June 24, 2000 trade that sent a 2000 fourth-round pick and a 2000 fifth-round pick to the Penguins in exchange for this pick.
- ^{a} The Montreal Canadiens' fourth-round pick (from the Mighty Ducks of Anaheim) went to the Pittsburgh Penguins as a result of a June 24, 2000 trade that sent a 2000 fourth-round pick to the Canadiens in exchange for a 2000 fifth-round pick and this pick.
- ^{b} The Montreal Canadiens' fifth-round pick went to the Pittsburgh Penguins as a result of a June 24, 2000 trade that sent a 2000 fourth-round pick to the Canadiens in exchange for a 2000 fourth-round pick and this pick.
- The Pittsburgh Penguins' fifth-round pick went to the Mighty Ducks of Anaheim as the result of a March 14, 2000 trade that sent Dan Trebil to the Penguins in exchange for this pick.
- ^{c} The Mighty Ducks of Anaheim's ninth-round pick went to the Pittsburgh Penguins as a result of a January 29, 2000 trade that sent Kip Miller to the Mighty Ducks in exchange for this pick.

== Farm teams ==
The Wilkes-Barre/Scranton Penguins of the AHL finished second in the Mid-Atlantic Division with a record of 36-33-9-2 record. They defeated the Syracuse Crunch, Philadelphia Phantoms and Hershey Bears to win the Robert W. Clarke Trophy as Western Conference playoff champions. They lost to the Saint John Flames in six games in the Calder Cup Finals. John Slaney won the Eddie Shore Award as defenseman of the year.

The ECHL's Wheeling Nailers finished last overall with a record of 24-40-8.

== See also ==
- 2000–01 NHL season
