= 2000–01 St. Louis Blues season =

National Hockey League team season

2000–01 St. Louis Blues
- Division: 2nd Central
- Conference: 4th Western
- 2000–01 record: 43–22–12–5
- Home record: 28–5–5–3
- Road record: 15–17–7–2
- Goals for: 249
- Goals against: 195

Team information
- General manager: Larry Pleau
- Coach: Joel Quenneville
- Captain: Chris Pronger
- Alternate captains: Al MacInnis; Pierre Turgeon
- Arena: Savvis Center
- Average attendance: 19,519
- Minor league affiliates: Worcester IceCats; Pensacola Ice Pilots

Team leaders
- Goals: Scott Young (40)
- Assists: Pierre Turgeon (52)
- Points: Pierre Turgeon (82)
- Penalty minutes: Reed Low (159)
- Plus/minus: Pavol Demitra (+27)
- Wins: Roman Turek (24)
- Goals against average: Brent Johnson (2.17)

The 2000–01 St. Louis Blues season was the 34th for the franchise in St. Louis, Missouri. After winning the Presidents' Trophy the previous season, the Blues finished the regular-season with a record of 43 wins, 22 losses, 12 ties and 5 overtime losses, enough for 103 points and a trip to the 2001 Stanley Cup playoffs. In the Western Conference Quarterfinals, the Blues defeated the San Jose Sharks in six games, then swept the Pacific Division-winning Dallas Stars in the Conference Semifinals before losing in five games to the eventual Stanley Cup champion Colorado Avalanche in the Conference Finals.

== Regular season ==
=== Final standings ===
Central Division
No.	CR		GP	W	L	T	OTL	GF	GA	Pts
1	2	**Detroit Red Wings**	82	49	20	9	4	253	202	111
2	4	**St. Louis Blues**	82	43	22	12	5	249	195	103
3	10	Nashville Predators	82	34	36	9	3	186	200	80
4	12	Chicago Blackhawks	82	29	40	8	5	210	246	71
5	13	Columbus Blue Jackets	82	28	39	9	6	190	233	71

Note: CR = Conference rank; GP = Games played; W = Wins; L = Losses; T = Ties; OTL = Overtime loss; GF = Goals for; GA = Goals against; Pts = Points
Bolded teams qualified for the playoffs.

Western Conference
R		Div	GP	W	L	T	OTL	GF	GA	Pts
**1**	**p – Colorado Avalanche**	**NW**	**82**	**52**	**16**	**10**	**4**	**270**	**192**	**118**
**2**	**y – Detroit Red Wings**	**CEN**	**82**	**49**	**20**	**9**	**4**	**253**	**202**	**111**
**3**	**y – Dallas Stars**	**PAC**	**82**	**48**	**24**	**8**	**2**	**241**	**187**	**106**
**4**	**St. Louis Blues**	**CEN**	**82**	**43**	**22**	**12**	**5**	**249**	**195**	**103**
**5**	**San Jose Sharks**	**PAC**	**82**	**40**	**27**	**12**	**3**	**217**	**192**	**95**
**6**	**Edmonton Oilers**	**NW**	**82**	**39**	**28**	**12**	**3**	**243**	**222**	**93**
**7**	**Los Angeles Kings**	**PAC**	**82**	**38**	**28**	**13**	**3**	**252**	**228**	**92**
**8**	**Vancouver Canucks**	**NW**	**82**	**36**	**28**	**11**	**7**	**239**	**238**	**90**
8.5
9	Phoenix Coyotes	PAC	82	35	27	17	3	214	212	90
10	Nashville Predators	CEN	82	34	36	9	3	186	200	80
11	Calgary Flames	NW	82	27	36	15	4	197	236	73
12	Chicago Blackhawks	CEN	82	29	40	8	5	210	246	71
13	Columbus Blue Jackets	CEN	82	28	39	9	6	190	233	71
14	Minnesota Wild	NW	82	25	39	13	5	168	210	68
15	Mighty Ducks of Anaheim	PAC	82	25	41	11	5	188	245	66

Divisions: CEN – Central, PAC – Pacific, NW – Northwest

bold – Qualified for playoffs; p – Won Presidents' Trophy; y – Won division

== Schedule and results ==
=== Regular season ===
2000–01 regular season
October: 9–2–1–0 (home: 5–0–0–0; road: 4–2–1–0)

Game	Date	Score	Opponent	Record	Recap
1	October 5, 2000	1–4	@ Phoenix Coyotes (2000–01)	0–1–0–0	L
2	October 6, 2000	4–1	@ San Jose Sharks (2000–01)	1–1–0–0	W
3	October 8, 2000	5–1	@ Mighty Ducks of Anaheim (2000–01)	2–1–0–0	W
4	October 11, 2000	4–4 OT	@ Los Angeles Kings (2000–01)	2–1–1–0	T
5	October 13, 2000	2–0	Minnesota Wild (2000–01)	3–1–1–0	W
6	October 17, 2000	1–2	@ Detroit Red Wings (2000–01)	3–2–1–0	L
7	October 19, 2000	7–1	Los Angeles Kings (2000–01)	4–2–1–0	W
8	October 21, 2000	1–0	Chicago Blackhawks (2000–01)	5–2–1–0	W
9	October 26, 2000	4–3	Calgary Flames (2000–01)	6–2–1–0	W
10	October 28, 2000	4–3 OT	Dallas Stars (2000–01)	7–2–1–0	W
11	October 29, 2000	4–1	@ Carolina Hurricanes (2000–01)	8–2–1–0	W
12	October 31, 2000	4–2	@ Nashville Predators (2000–01)	9–2–1–0	W

November: 7–2–2–0 (home: 4–1–1–0; road: 3–1–1–0)

Game	Date	Score	Opponent	Record	Recap
13	November 2, 2000	2–0	Washington Capitals (2000–01)	10–2–1–0	W
14	November 4, 2000	0–0 OT	Toronto Maple Leafs (2000–01)	10–2–2–0	T
15	November 9, 2000	3–3 OT	@ Colorado Avalanche (2000–01)	10–2–3–0	T
16	November 11, 2000	5–2	@ Vancouver Canucks (2000–01)	11–2–3–0	W
17	November 14, 2000	0–3	@ Edmonton Oilers (2000–01)	11–3–3–0	L
18	November 16, 2000	4–3	Pittsburgh Penguins (2000–01)	12–3–3–0	W
19	November 18, 2000	4–1	Buffalo Sabres (2000–01)	13–3–3–0	W
20	November 21, 2000	3–4	Vancouver Canucks (2000–01)	13–4–3–0	L
21	November 24, 2000	4–0	@ Nashville Predators (2000–01)	14–4–3–0	W
22	November 25, 2000	5–1	Phoenix Coyotes (2000–01)	15–4–3–0	W
23	November 29, 2000	6–5 OT	@ Toronto Maple Leafs (2000–01)	16–4–3–0	W

December: 9–1–1–0 (home: 6–1–1–0; road: 3–0–0–0)

Game	Date	Score	Opponent	Record	Recap
24	December 2, 2000	5–2	Florida Panthers (2000–01)	17–4–3–0	W
25	December 5, 2000	1–0	Mighty Ducks of Anaheim (2000–01)	18–4–3–0	W
26	December 9, 2000	6–4	Chicago Blackhawks (2000–01)	19–4–3–0	W
27	December 10, 2000	6–1	@ Chicago Blackhawks (2000–01)	20–4–3–0	W
28	December 15, 2000	6–3	@ Atlanta Thrashers (2000–01)	21–4–3–0	W
29	December 16, 2000	2–2 OT	Detroit Red Wings (2000–01)	21–4–4–0	T
30	December 20, 2000	6–3	@ New York Rangers (2000–01)	22–4–4–0	W
31	December 23, 2000	5–2	Mighty Ducks of Anaheim (2000–01)	23–4–4–0	W
32	December 26, 2000	5–0	Columbus Blue Jackets (2000–01)	24–4–4–0	W
33	December 28, 2000	2–5	Los Angeles Kings (2000–01)	24–5–4–0	L
34	December 30, 2000	2–1	Phoenix Coyotes (2000–01)	25–5–4–0	W

January: 9–6–0–2 (home: 6–1–0–2; road: 3–5–0–0)

Game	Date	Score	Opponent	Record	Recap
35	January 1, 2001	5–2	Edmonton Oilers (2000–01)	26–5–4–0	W
36	January 2, 2001	1–3	@ Ottawa Senators (2000–01)	26–6–4–0	L
37	January 4, 2001	2–4	Nashville Predators (2000–01)	26–7–4–0	L
38	January 6, 2001	5–1	Minnesota Wild (2000–01)	27–7–4–0	W
39	January 8, 2001	1–2 OT	Philadelphia Flyers (2000–01)	27–7–4–1	OTL
40	January 10, 2001	4–2	@ Mighty Ducks of Anaheim (2000–01)	28–7–4–1	W
41	January 11, 2001	3–6	@ San Jose Sharks (2000–01)	28–8–4–1	L
42	January 13, 2001	4–2	@ Los Angeles Kings (2000–01)	29–8–4–1	W
43	January 15, 2001	1–3	@ Phoenix Coyotes (2000–01)	29–9–4–1	L
44	January 18, 2001	4–1	Edmonton Oilers (2000–01)	30–9–4–1	W
45	January 20, 2001	3–0	Vancouver Canucks (2000–01)	31–9–4–1	W
46	January 21, 2001	1–3	@ Nashville Predators (2000–01)	31–10–4–1	L
47	January 23, 2001	5–2	@ Montreal Canadiens (2000–01)	32–10–4–1	W
48	January 25, 2001	4–3 OT	New Jersey Devils (2000–01)	33–10–4–1	W
49	January 27, 2001	3–4 OT	San Jose Sharks (2000–01)	33–10–4–2	OTL
50	January 29, 2001	2–1	Toronto Maple Leafs (2000–01)	34–10–4–2	W
51	January 30, 2001	1–5	@ Boston Bruins (2000–01)	34–11–4–2	L

February: 5–5–3–0 (home: 4–0–1–0; road: 1–5–2–0)

Game	Date	Score	Opponent	Record	Recap
52	February 1, 2001	2–2 OT	Columbus Blue Jackets (2000–01)	34–11–5–2	T
53	February 6, 2001	2–2 OT	@ Columbus Blue Jackets (2000–01)	34–11–6–2	T
54	February 8, 2001	4–1	Tampa Bay Lightning (2000–01)	35–11–6–2	W
55	February 10, 2001	4–3 OT	@ Colorado Avalanche (2000–01)	36–11–6–2	W
56	February 11, 2001	3–3 OT	@ Dallas Stars (2000–01)	36–11–7–2	T
57	February 15, 2001	4–1	Calgary Flames (2000–01)	37–11–7–2	W
58	February 16, 2001	2–6	@ Chicago Blackhawks (2000–01)	37–12–7–2	L
59	February 19, 2001	0–3	@ Florida Panthers (2000–01)	37–13–7–2	L
60	February 20, 2001	2–3	@ Tampa Bay Lightning (2000–01)	37–14–7–2	L
61	February 23, 2001	2–4	@ Detroit Red Wings (2000–01)	37–15–7–2	L
62	February 24, 2001	3–2 OT	Boston Bruins (2000–01)	38–15–7–2	W
63	February 26, 2001	7–2	San Jose Sharks (2000–01)	39–15–7–2	W
64	February 28, 2001	3–5	@ Edmonton Oilers (2000–01)	39–16–7–2	L

March: 2–5–4–3 (home: 1–2–1–1; road: 1–3–3–2)

Game	Date	Score	Opponent	Record	Recap
65	March 2, 2001	2–3 OT	@ Vancouver Canucks (2000–01)	39–16–7–3	OTL
66	March 3, 2001	2–3 OT	@ Calgary Flames (2000–01)	39–16–7–4	OTL
67	March 6, 2001	3–3 OT	@ Minnesota Wild (2000–01)	39–16–8–4	T
68	March 8, 2001	2–5	Colorado Avalanche (2000–01)	39–17–8–4	L
69	March 10, 2001	2–2 OT	Detroit Red Wings (2000–01)	39–17–9–4	T
70	March 13, 2001	2–5	@ Philadelphia Flyers (2000–01)	39–18–9–4	L
71	March 14, 2001	1–0 OT	@ Minnesota Wild (2000–01)	40–18–9–4	W
72	March 17, 2001	2–2 OT	@ Calgary Flames (2000–01)	40–18–10–4	T
73	March 20, 2001	3–4 OT	New York Islanders (2000–01)	40–18–10–5	OTL
74	March 22, 2001	1–3	Colorado Avalanche (2000–01)	40–19–10–5	L
75	March 24, 2001	5–1	Chicago Blackhawks (2000–01)	41–19–10–5	W
76	March 25, 2001	1–1 OT	@ Dallas Stars (2000–01)	41–19–11–5	T
77	March 28, 2001	2–5	@ Detroit Red Wings (2000–01)	41–20–11–5	L
78	March 31, 2001	3–5	@ Pittsburgh Penguins (2000–01)	41–21–11–5	L

April: 2–1–1–0 (home: 2–0–1–0; road: 0–1–0–0)

Game	Date	Score	Opponent	Record	Recap
79	April 1, 2001	1–2	@ Columbus Blue Jackets (2000–01)	41–22–11–5	L
80	April 3, 2001	2–2 OT	Carolina Hurricanes (2000–01)	41–22–12–5	T
81	April 5, 2001	4–1	Columbus Blue Jackets (2000–01)	42–22–12–5	W
82	April 7, 2001	1–0	Nashville Predators (2000–01)	43–22–12–5	W

Legend: W Win (2 points) L Loss (0 points) T Tie (1 point) OTL Overtime loss (1 point)

=== Playoffs ===
2001 Stanley Cup playoffs
Western Conference Quarterfinals vs. (5) San Jose Sharks: Blues win 4–2

Game	Date	Score	Opponent	Series	Recap
1	April 12, 2001	3–1	San Jose Sharks	Blues lead 1–0	W
2	April 14, 2001	0–1	San Jose Sharks	Series tied 1–1	L
3	April 16, 2001	6–3	@ San Jose Sharks	Blues lead 2–1	W
4	April 17, 2001	2–3	@ San Jose Sharks	Series tied 2–2	L
5	April 19, 2001	3–2 OT	San Jose Sharks	Blues lead 3–2	W
6	April 21, 2001	2–1	@ San Jose Sharks	Blues win 4–2	W

Western Conference Semifinals vs. (3) Dallas Stars: Blues win 4–0

Game	Date	Score	Opponent	Series	Recap
1	April 27, 2001	4–2	@ Dallas Stars	Blues lead 1–0	W
2	April 29, 2001	2–1	@ Dallas Stars	Blues lead 2–0	W
3	May 1, 2001	3–2 2OT	Dallas Stars	Blues lead 3–0	W
4	May 3, 2001	4–1	Dallas Stars	Blues win 4–0	W

Western Conference Finals vs. (1) Colorado Avalanche: Avalanche win 4–1

Game	Date	Score	Opponent	Series	Recap
1	May 12, 2001	1–4	@ Colorado Avalanche	Avalanche lead 1–0	L
2	May 14, 2001	2–4	@ Colorado Avalanche	Avalanche lead 2–0	L
3	May 16, 2001	4–3 2OT	Colorado Avalanche	Avalanche lead 2–1	W
4	May 18, 2001	3–4 OT	Colorado Avalanche	Avalanche lead 3–1	L
5	May 21, 2001	1–2 OT	@ Colorado Avalanche	Avalanche win 4–1	L

Legend: W Win L Loss

== Player statistics ==
=== Scoring ===
- Position abbreviations: C = Center; D = Defense; G = Goaltender; LW = Left wing; RW = Right wing
- † = Joined team via a transaction (e.g., trade, waivers, signing) during the season. Stats reflect time with the Blues only.
- ‡ = Left team via a transaction (e.g., trade, waivers, release) during the season. Stats reflect time with the Blues only.

No.	Player	Pos	Regular season						Playoffs					
No.	Player	Pos	GP	G	A	Pts	+/-	PIM	GP	G	A	Pts	+/-	PIM
77	Pierre Turgeon	C	79	30	52	82	14	37	15	5	10	15	8	2
48	Scott Young	RW	81	40	33	73	15	30	15	6	7	13	9	2
2	Al MacInnis	D	59	12	42	54	23	52	15	2	8	10	2	18
44	Chris Pronger	D	51	8	39	47	21	75	15	1	7	8	10	32
38	Pavol Demitra	LW	44	20	25	45	27	16	15	2	4	6	3	2
17	Jochen Hecht	LW	72	19	25	44	11	48	15	2	4	6	−3	4
10	Dallas Drake	RW	82	12	29	41	18	71	15	4	2	6	1	16
22	Craig Conroy‡	C	69	11	14	25	2	46	—	—	—	—	—	—
26	Michal Handzus‡	C	36	10	14	24	11	12	—	—	—	—	—	—
29	Alexander Khavanov	D	74	7	16	23	16	52	15	3	2	5	4	14
32	Mike Eastwood	C	77	6	17	23	4	28	15	0	2	2	0	2
21	Jamal Mayers	RW	77	8	13	21	−3	117	15	2	3	5	2	8
12	Ladislav Nagy‡	LW	40	8	8	16	−2	20	—	—	—	—	—	—
9	Tyson Nash	LW	57	8	7	15	8	110	—	—	—	—	—	—
18	Daniel Corso	C	28	10	3	13	0	14	12	0	1	1	−5	0
23	Lubos Bartecko	LW	50	5	8	13	−1	12	—	—	—	—	—	—
15	Marty Reasoner	C	41	4	9	13	−5	14	10	3	1	4	1	0
6	Sean Hill	D	48	1	10	11	5	51	15	0	1	1	−1	12
37	Jeff Finley	D	72	2	8	10	7	38	2	0	0	0	−1	0
27	Bryce Salvador	D	75	2	8	10	−4	69	14	2	0	2	−7	18
19	Scott Mellanby†	RW	23	7	1	8	0	25	15	3	3	6	−1	17
7	Keith Tkachuk†	LW	12	6	2	8	−3	14	15	2	7	9	0	20
12	Cory Stillman†	LW	12	3	4	7	−2	6	15	3	5	8	0	8
28	Todd Reirden	D	38	2	4	6	−2	43	1	0	0	0	0	0
34	Reed Low	RW	56	1	5	6	4	159	—	—	—	—	—	—
5	Alexei Gusarov†	D	16	0	4	4	−3	6	13	0	0	0	4	4
47	Darren Rumble	D	12	0	4	4	7	27	—	—	—	—	—	—
33	Reid Simpson	LW	38	2	1	3	−3	96	5	0	0	0	0	2
55	Vladimir Chebaturkin	D	22	1	2	3	5	26	—	—	—	—	—	—
25	Pascal Rheaume	C	8	2	0	2	−1	5	3	0	1	1	1	0
20	Peter Smrek‡	D	6	2	0	2	1	2	—	—	—	—	—	—
1	Roman Turek	G	54	0	1	1		6	14	0	0	0		2
4	Marc Bergevin‡	D	2	0	0	0	1	0	—	—	—	—	—	—
14	Eric Boguniecki†	C	1	0	0	0	−1	0	—	—	—	—	—	—
49	Dale Clarke	D	3	0	0	0	1	0	—	—	—	—	—	—
35	Brent Johnson	G	31	0	0	0		2	2	0	0	0		0
43	Jaroslav Obsut	D	4	0	0	0	1	2	—	—	—	—	—	—
36	Dan Trebil†	D	10	0	0	0	1	0	—	—	—	—	—	—
7	Mike Van Ryn	D	1	0	0	0	−2	0	—	—	—	—	—	—

=== Goaltending ===
No.	Player	Regular season										Playoffs								
No.	Player	GP	W	L	T	SA	GA	GAA	SV%	SO	TOI	GP	W	L	SA	GA	GAA	SV%	SO	TOI
1	Roman Turek	54	24	18	10	1248	123	2.28	.901	6	3232	14	9	5	382	31	2.05	.919	0	908
35	Brent Johnson	31	19	9	2	676	63	2.17	.907	4	1744	2	0	1	2	36	1.94	.944	0	62

== Awards and records ==
=== Awards ===
Type	Award/honor	Recipient	Ref
League (in-season)	NHL All-Star Game selection	Al MacInnis (Note: MacInnis did not play and was replaced by Scott Niedermayer of the New Jersey Devils.)	
League (in-season)	NHL All-Star Game selection	Chris Pronger (Note: Pronger was voted to the starting lineup, but did not play and was replaced by Ed Jovanovski of the Vancouver Canucks.)	
League (in-season)	NHL All-Star Game selection	Joel Quenneville (coach)	
League (in-season)	NHL Player of the Week	Scott Young (October 30)	

=== Milestones ===
Milestone	Player	Date	Ref
First game	Bryce Salvador	October 5, 2000	
First game	Mike Van Ryn	October 5, 2000	
First game	Alexander Khavanov	October 6, 2000	
First game	Reed Low	October 13, 2000	
First game	Daniel Corso	December 5, 2000	
First game	Dale Clarke	February 10, 2001	
First game	Peter Smrek	February 10, 2001	
First game	Jaroslav Obsut	March 2, 2001	
1,000th game played	Pierre Turgeon	March 22, 2001	

== Transactions ==
The Blues were involved in the following transactions from June 11, 2000, the day after the deciding game of the 2000 Stanley Cup Final, through June 9, 2001, the day of the deciding game of the 2001 Stanley Cup Final.

=== Trades ===
Date	Details		Ref
November 30, 2000	To St. Louis Blues: Mike Peluso	To Washington Capitals: Derek Bekar	
December 18, 2000	To St. Louis Blues: Eric Boguniecki	To Florida Panthers: Andrej Podkonicky	
December 28, 2000	To St. Louis Blues: Dan Trebil	To Pittsburgh Penguins: Marc Bergevin	
February 9, 2001	To St. Louis Blues: Scott Mellanby	To Florida Panthers: Rights to David Morisset; 5th-round pick in 2002	
March 5, 2001	To St. Louis Blues: Alexei Gusarov	To New York Rangers: Peter Smrek	
March 13, 2001	To St. Louis Blues: Cory Stillman	To Calgary Flames: Craig Conroy; 7th-round pick in 2001	
March 13, 2001	To St. Louis Blues: Keith Tkachuk	To Phoenix Coyotes: Michal Handzus; Ladislav Nagy; Rights to Jeff Taffe; 1st-round pick in 2001 or 2002	

=== Players acquired ===
Date	Player	Former team	Term	Via	Ref
June 12, 2000	Vladimir Chebaturkin	New York Islanders		Free agency	
June 30, 2000	Mike Van Ryn	Sarnia Sting (OHL)		Free agency	
July 1, 2000	Dallas Drake	Columbus Blue Jackets	4-year	Free agency	
July 1, 2000	Sean Hill	Carolina Hurricanes	4-year	Free agency	
July 14, 2000	Dwayne Roloson	Columbus Blue Jackets		Free agency	
July 27, 2000	Chris Murray	Dallas Stars	multi-year	Free agency	
August 22, 2000	Reid Simpson	Tampa Bay Lightning		Free agency	
October 9, 2000	Curtis Sanford	Missouri River Otters (UHL)		Free agency	
March 13, 2001	Sebastien Bordeleau	Nashville Predators		Waivers	
April 11, 2001	Blake Evans	Regina Pats (WHL)		Free agency	
May 7, 2001	Greg Davis	McGill University (CIAU)		Free agency	
May 7, 2001	Jeff Panzer	University of North Dakota (WCHA)		Free agency	

=== Players lost ===
Date	Player	New team	Via (Note: In parentheses is the player's free agency group on July 1 if applicable.)	Ref
June 22, 2000	Libor Prochazka	HC Karlovy Vary (ELH)	Free agency (UFA)	
June 23, 2000	Jamie McLennan	Minnesota Wild	Expansion draft	
June 23, 2000	Scott Pellerin	Minnesota Wild	Expansion draft	
July 1, 2000	Bob Bassen (Note: Bassen retired.)		Contract expiration (III)	
July 1, 2000	Dan Keczmer (Note: Keczmer retired. He attended the Tampa Bay Lightning’s training camp on a tryout in September 2000 but was ultimately released.)		Contract expiration (UFA)	
July 7, 2000	Sylvain Blouin	Montreal Canadiens	Free agency (VI)	
July 12, 2000	Ricard Persson	Ottawa Senators	Free agency (UFA)	
July 28, 2000	Kelly Chase		Retirement (III)	
August 10, 2000	Derek King	Ottawa Senators	Free agency (III)	
August 21, 2000	Bryan Helmer	Vancouver Canucks	Free agency (VI)	
August 22, 2000	Jim Campbell	Montreal Canadiens	Free agency (UFA)	
August 25, 2000	Stephane Richer	Washington Capitals	Free agency (III)	
September 7, 2000	David Ellett		Retirement (III)	
November 16, 2000	Rudy Poeschek	Houston Aeros (IHL)	Free agency (III)	

=== Signings ===
Date	Player	Term	Contract type	Ref
June 12, 2000	Alexander Khavanov		Entry-level	
June 12, 2000	Matt Walker		Entry-level	
July 1, 2000	Marc Bergevin	1-year	Option exercised	
July 1, 2000	Mike Eastwood	multi-year	Re-signing	
July 1, 2000	Tyson Nash	multi-year	Re-signing	
July 14, 2000	Todd Reirden	multi-year	Re-signing	
July 27, 2000	Bryce Salvador	multi-year	Re-signing	
August 2, 2000	Brent Johnson	1-year	Re-signing	
August 2, 2000	Reed Low	1-year	Re-signing	
September 12, 2000	Lubos Bartecko	1-year	Re-signing	
September 12, 2000	Michal Handzus	3-year	Re-signing	
October 20, 2000	Derek Bekar	multi-year	Re-signing	
October 20, 2000	Reed Low	multi-year	Extension	
October 20, 2000	Justin Papineau		Entry-level	
October 26, 2000	Chris Pronger	3-year	Extension	

== Draft picks ==
St. Louis's draft picks at the 2000 NHL entry draft held at the Pengrowth Saddledome in Calgary, Alberta.

Round	#	Player	Nationality	College/Junior/Club team (League)
1	30	Jeff Taffe	United States	University of Minnesota (WCHA)
2	65	David Morisset	Canada	Seattle Thunderbirds (WHL)
3	75	Justin Papineau	Canada	Belleville Bulls (OHL)
3	96	Antoine Bergeron	Canada	Val-d'Or Foreurs (QMJHL)
4	129	Troy Riddle	United States	Des Moines Buccaneers (USHL)
5	167	Craig Weller	Canada	Calgary Canucks (AJHL)
7	229	Brett Lutes	Canada	Montreal Rocket (QMJHL)
8	261	Reinhard Divis	Austria	Leksands IF (Sweden)
9	293	Lauri Kinos	Finland	Montreal Rocket (QMJHL)

== See also ==
- 2000–01 NHL season
