= 2000–01 Colorado Avalanche season =

National Hockey League team season

2000–01 Colorado Avalanche
- Stanley Cup champions
- Presidents' Trophy winners
- Western Conference champions
- Northwest Division champions
- Division: 1st Northwest
- Conference: 1st Western
- 2000–01 record: 52–16–10–4
- Home record: 28–6–5–2
- Road record: 24–10–5–2
- Goals for: 270
- Goals against: 192

Team information
- General manager: Pierre Lacroix
- Coach: Bob Hartley
- Captain: Joe Sakic
- Alternate captains: Ray Bourque; Peter Forsberg
- Arena: Pepsi Center
- Average attendance: 18,007
- Minor league affiliate: Hershey Bears

Team leaders
- Goals: Joe Sakic (54)
- Assists: Joe Sakic (64)
- Points: Joe Sakic (118)
- Penalty minutes: Scott Parker (155)
- Plus/minus: Joe Sakic (+45)
- Wins: Patrick Roy (40)
- Goals against average: Patrick Roy (2.21)

The 2000–01 Colorado Avalanche season was the franchise's 29th season, 22nd in the National Hockey League, and sixth as the Colorado Avalanche. The Avalanche won their second Stanley Cup by defeating the defending champion New Jersey Devils 4–3 in the Final. Ray Bourque would be the first and only NHL player to hoist the Stanley Cup prior to the team captain when Joe Sakic handed it to him out of respect for the future Hall of Famer in what proved to be his final game.

This would be the last Stanley Cup title for the Avalanche until 2022.

== Regular season ==
- October 14, 2000: In a victory over the expansion Columbus Blue Jackets, Patrick Roy tied Terry Sawchuk for most career wins by a goaltender.
- October 17, 2000: In an overtime victory over the Washington Capitals, Patrick Roy broke Terry Sawchuk's record for most career wins by a goaltender.
- October 20, 2000: A pre-game ceremony was held to honour Patrick Roy's 448th career victory. NHL Commissioner Gary Bettman presented Roy with a goalie stick dipped in silver. On the stick was engraved the name of every building he ever played in. The names of his children were also on the stick. Governor of Colorado Bill Owens proclaimed October 20 to 26 "Patrick Roy week" in the State of Colorado. Jerry Sawchuk, Terry's son, raised Patrick's arm in the air. The Avalanche defeated the Florida Panthers 5-1 in that game.
- February 4, 2001: The 2001 National Hockey League All-Star Game took place at the Pepsi Center in Denver, Colorado. The final score was North America 14, World 12. Five Avalanche players took part in the game as well as head coach Bob Hartley serving as an assistant coach for the North America team.
- February 13, 2001: Patrick Roy made his first visit to Montreal since breaking Terry Sawchuk's record for most wins by a goaltender. Roy had won 289 games with the Montreal Canadiens, and the Canadiens held a pre-game ceremony for Roy. On that night, the Avalanche defeated the Canadiens in overtime 3-2.
- March 24, 2001: Ray Bourque returned to Boston one last time as a player. This was also his first and only visit to Boston since being traded to the Avalanche. The Bruins fans gave Bourque a standing ovation as the Avalanche defeated the Bruins 4-2.
- April 8, 2001: Patrick Roy won his 40th game on the season, marking the first and only time in his career he reached that total in a single season.

=== Season standings ===
Northwest Division
No.	CR		GP	W	L	T	OTL	GF	GA	Pts
1	1	**Colorado Avalanche**	82	52	16	10	4	270	192	118
2	6	**Edmonton Oilers**	82	39	28	12	3	243	222	93
3	8	**Vancouver Canucks**	82	36	28	11	7	239	238	90
4	11	Calgary Flames	82	27	36	15	4	197	236	73
5	14	Minnesota Wild	82	25	39	13	5	168	210	68

Note: CR = Conference rank; GP = Games played; W = Wins; L = Losses; T = Ties; OTL = Overtime loss; GF = Goals for; GA = Goals against; Pts = Points
Bolded teams qualified for the playoffs.

Western Conference
R		Div	GP	W	L	T	OTL	GF	GA	Pts
**1**	**p – Colorado Avalanche**	**NW**	**82**	**52**	**16**	**10**	**4**	**270**	**192**	**118**
**2**	**y – Detroit Red Wings**	**CEN**	**82**	**49**	**20**	**9**	**4**	**253**	**202**	**111**
**3**	**y – Dallas Stars**	**PAC**	**82**	**48**	**24**	**8**	**2**	**241**	**187**	**106**
**4**	**St. Louis Blues**	**CEN**	**82**	**43**	**22**	**12**	**5**	**249**	**195**	**103**
**5**	**San Jose Sharks**	**PAC**	**82**	**40**	**27**	**12**	**3**	**217**	**192**	**95**
**6**	**Edmonton Oilers**	**NW**	**82**	**39**	**28**	**12**	**3**	**243**	**222**	**93**
**7**	**Los Angeles Kings**	**PAC**	**82**	**38**	**28**	**13**	**3**	**252**	**228**	**92**
**8**	**Vancouver Canucks**	**NW**	**82**	**36**	**28**	**11**	**7**	**239**	**238**	**90**
8.5
9	Phoenix Coyotes	PAC	82	35	27	17	3	214	212	90
10	Nashville Predators	CEN	82	34	36	9	3	186	200	80
11	Calgary Flames	NW	82	27	36	15	4	197	236	73
12	Chicago Blackhawks	CEN	82	29	40	8	5	210	246	71
13	Columbus Blue Jackets	CEN	82	28	39	9	6	190	233	71
14	Minnesota Wild	NW	82	25	39	13	5	168	210	68
15	Mighty Ducks of Anaheim	PAC	82	25	41	11	5	188	245	66

Divisions: CEN – Central, PAC – Pacific, NW – Northwest

bold – Qualified for playoffs; p – Won Presidents' Trophy; y – Won division

== Schedule and results ==
=== Regular season ===
2000–01 regular season
October: 9–1–2–0 (home: 4–1–0–0; road: 5–0–2–0)

Game	Date	Score	Opponent	Record	Recap
1	October 4, 2000	2–2 OT	@ Dallas Stars (2000–01)	0–0–1–0	T
2	October 7, 2000	1–1 OT	@ Edmonton Oilers (2000–01)	0–0–2–0	T
3	October 10, 2000	3–1	@ Calgary Flames (2000–01)	1–0–2–0	W
4	October 12, 2000	5–2	@ Vancouver Canucks (2000–01)	2–0–2–0	W
5	October 14, 2000	3–1	Columbus Blue Jackets (2000–01)	3–0–2–0	W
6	October 17, 2000	4–3 OT	@ Washington Capitals (2000–01)	4–0–2–0	W
7	October 18, 2000	5–1	@ Columbus Blue Jackets (2000–01)	5–0–2–0	W
8	October 20, 2000	5–1	Florida Panthers (2000–01)	6–0–2–0	W
9	October 25, 2000	2–1 OT	Nashville Predators (2000–01)	7–0–2–0	W
10	October 26, 2000	2–0	@ Chicago Blackhawks (2000–01)	8–0–2–0	W
11	October 28, 2000	4–2	Edmonton Oilers (2000–01)	9–0–2–0	W
12	October 30, 2000	0–4	Phoenix Coyotes (2000–01)	9–1–2–0	L

November: 8–3–1–0 (home: 7–0–1–0; road: 1–3–0–0)

Game	Date	Score	Opponent	Record	Recap
13	November 1, 2000	3–4	@ Vancouver Canucks (2000–01)	9–2–2–0	L
14	November 3, 2000	5–3	Carolina Hurricanes (2000–01)	10–2–2–0	W
15	November 7, 2000	2–0	Minnesota Wild (2000–01)	11–2–2–0	W
16	November 9, 2000	3–3 OT	St. Louis Blues (2000–01)	11–2–3–0	T
17	November 11, 2000	3–1	Mighty Ducks of Anaheim (2000–01)	12–2–3–0	W
18	November 13, 2000	3–2 OT	Pittsburgh Penguins (2000–01)	13–2–3–0	W
19	November 15, 2000	3–0	@ Mighty Ducks of Anaheim (2000–01)	14–2–3–0	W
20	November 16, 2000	3–6	@ Phoenix Coyotes (2000–01)	14–3–3–0	L
21	November 18, 2000	4–6	@ Los Angeles Kings (2000–01)	14–4–3–0	L
22	November 22, 2000	5–2	Columbus Blue Jackets (2000–01)	15–4–3–0	W
23	November 25, 2000	3–2 OT	Calgary Flames (2000–01)	16–4–3–0	W
24	November 29, 2000	2–1	Phoenix Coyotes (2000–01)	17–4–3–0	W

December: 8–4–2–0 (home: 5–2–2–0; road: 3–2–0–0)

Game	Date	Score	Opponent	Record	Recap
25	December 1, 2000	4–2	Dallas Stars (2000–01)	18–4–3–0	W
26	December 3, 2000	6–3	@ New York Rangers (2000–01)	19–4–3–0	W
27	December 5, 2000	1–6	@ New Jersey Devils (2000–01)	19–5–3–0	L
28	December 8, 2000	2–0	@ Tampa Bay Lightning (2000–01)	20–5–3–0	W
29	December 9, 2000	4–2	@ Florida Panthers (2000–01)	21–5–3–0	W
30	December 11, 2000	2–2 OT	Tampa Bay Lightning (2000–01)	21–5–4–0	T
31	December 13, 2000	3–3 OT	Philadelphia Flyers (2000–01)	21–5–5–0	T
32	December 15, 2000	3–5	Detroit Red Wings (2000–01)	21–6–5–0	L
33	December 19, 2000	0–3	Calgary Flames (2000–01)	21–7–5–0	L
34	December 21, 2000	5–2	Los Angeles Kings (2000–01)	22–7–5–0	W
35	December 23, 2000	3–2 OT	Vancouver Canucks (2000–01)	23–7–5–0	W
36	December 26, 2000	2–5	@ Nashville Predators (2000–01)	23–8–5–0	L
37	December 27, 2000	3–2	Edmonton Oilers (2000–01)	24–8–5–0	W
38	December 29, 2000	3–1	Nashville Predators (2000–01)	25–8–5–0	W

January: 10–0–3–1 (home: 4–0–1–0; road: 6–0–2–1)

Game	Date	Score	Opponent	Record	Recap
39	January 2, 2001	6–2	Los Angeles Kings (2000–01)	26–8–5–0	W
40	January 4, 2001	2–2 OT	San Jose Sharks (2000–01)	26–8–6–0	T
41	January 6, 2001	2–2 OT	@ Carolina Hurricanes (2000–01)	26–8–7–0	T
42	January 7, 2001	3–4 OT	@ Detroit Red Wings (2000–01)	26–8–7–1	OTL
43	January 10, 2001	4–2	@ Columbus Blue Jackets (2000–01)	27–8–7–1	W
44	January 12, 2001	5–0	@ Minnesota Wild (2000–01)	28–8–7–1	W
45	January 14, 2001	2–2 OT	@ Chicago Blackhawks (2000–01)	28–8–8–1	T
46	January 16, 2001	4–1	New York Islanders (2000–01)	29–8–8–1	W
47	January 18, 2001	7–3	Vancouver Canucks (2000–01)	30–8–8–1	W
48	January 20, 2001	2–1	@ San Jose Sharks (2000–01)	31–8–8–1	W
49	January 21, 2001	4–2	@ Mighty Ducks of Anaheim (2000–01)	32–8–8–1	W
50	January 26, 2001	5–2	Chicago Blackhawks (2000–01)	33–8–8–1	W
51	January 27, 2001	5–1	@ Nashville Predators (2000–01)	34–8–8–1	W
52	January 30, 2001	3–1	@ San Jose Sharks (2000–01)	35–8–8–1	W

February: 5–4–1–1 (home: 3–2–0–1; road: 2–2–1–0)

Game	Date	Score	Opponent	Record	Recap
53	February 1, 2001	3–5	@ Vancouver Canucks (2000–01)	35–9–8–1	L
54	February 7, 2001	1–3	Washington Capitals (2000–01)	35–10–8–1	L
55	February 9, 2001	3–5	Calgary Flames (2000–01)	35–11–8–1	L
56	February 10, 2001	3–4 OT	St. Louis Blues (2000–01)	35–11–8–2	OTL
57	February 13, 2001	3–2 OT	@ Montreal Canadiens (2000–01)	36–11–8–2	W
58	February 15, 2001	1–4	@ Ottawa Senators (2000–01)	36–12–8–2	L
59	February 17, 2001	5–5 OT	@ Toronto Maple Leafs (2000–01)	36–12–9–2	T
60	February 19, 2001	5–1	@ Pittsburgh Penguins (2000–01)	37–12–9–2	W
61	February 21, 2001	8–2	Boston Bruins (2000–01)	38–12–9–2	W
62	February 23, 2001	4–1	Minnesota Wild (2000–01)	39–12–9–2	W
63	February 25, 2001	5–2	Atlanta Thrashers (2000–01)	40–12–9–2	W

March: 10–3–0–2 (home: 4–1–0–1; road: 6–2–0–1)

Game	Date	Score	Opponent	Record	Recap
64	March 3, 2001	2–3 OT	Buffalo Sabres (2000–01)	40–12–9–3	OTL
65	March 4, 2001	5–0	@ Phoenix Coyotes (2000–01)	41–12–9–3	W
66	March 6, 2001	4–2	@ Atlanta Thrashers (2000–01)	42–12–9–3	W
67	March 8, 2001	5–2	@ St. Louis Blues (2000–01)	43–12–9–3	W
68	March 10, 2001	2–3 OT	@ Dallas Stars (2000–01)	43–12–9–4	OTL
69	March 11, 2001	3–2	Dallas Stars (2000–01)	44–12–9–4	W
70	March 13, 2001	3–6	New Jersey Devils (2000–01)	44–13–9–4	L
71	March 17, 2001	5–3	Detroit Red Wings (2000–01)	45–13–9–4	W
72	March 18, 2001	4–3	Minnesota Wild (2000–01)	46–13–9–4	W
73	March 20, 2001	4–1	San Jose Sharks (2000–01)	47–13–9–4	W
74	March 22, 2001	3–1	@ St. Louis Blues (2000–01)	48–13–9–4	W
75	March 24, 2001	4–2	@ Boston Bruins (2000–01)	49–13–9–4	W
76	March 28, 2001	1–4	@ Edmonton Oilers (2000–01)	49–14–9–4	L
77	March 29, 2001	1–0	@ Calgary Flames (2000–01)	50–14–9–4	W
78	March 31, 2001	0–4	@ Los Angeles Kings (2000–01)	50–15–9–4	L

April: 2–1–1–0 (home: 1–0–1–0; road: 1–1–0–0)

Game	Date	Score	Opponent	Record	Recap
79	April 2, 2001	5–3	Edmonton Oilers (2000–01)	51–15–9–4	W
80	April 4, 2001	1–1 OT	Mighty Ducks of Anaheim (2000–01)	51–15–10–4	T
81	April 7, 2001	3–4	@ Detroit Red Wings (2000–01)	51–16–10–4	L
82	April 8, 2001	4–2	@ Minnesota Wild (2000–01)	52–16–10–4	W

Legend: W Win (2 points) L Loss (0 points) T Tie (1 point) OTL Overtime loss (1 point)

=== Playoffs ===
2001 Stanley Cup playoffs
Western Conference Quarterfinals vs. (8) Vancouver Canucks – Avalanche win 4–0

Game	Date	Score	Opponent	Series	Recap
1	April 12, 2001	5–4	Vancouver Canucks	Avalanche lead 1–0	W
2	April 14, 2001	2–1	Vancouver Canucks	Avalanche lead 2–0	W
3	April 16, 2001	4–3 OT	@ Vancouver Canucks	Avalanche lead 3–0	W
4	April 18, 2001	5–1	@ Vancouver Canucks	Avalanche win 4–0	W

Western Conference Semifinals vs. (7) Los Angeles Kings – Avalanche win 4–3

Game	Date	Score	Opponent	Series	Recap
1	April 26, 2001	3–4 OT	Los Angeles Kings	Kings lead 1–0	L
2	April 28, 2001	2–0	Los Angeles Kings	Series tied 1–1	W
3	April 30, 2001	4–3	@ Los Angeles Kings	Avalanche lead 2–1	W
4	May 2, 2001	3–0	@ Los Angeles Kings	Avalanche lead 3–1	W
5	May 4, 2001	0–1	Los Angeles Kings	Avalanche lead 3–2	L
6	May 6, 2001	0–1 2OT	@ Los Angeles Kings	Series tied 3–3	L
7	May 8, 2001	5–1	Los Angeles Kings	Avalanche win 4–3	W

Western Conference Finals vs. (4) St. Louis Blues: Avalanche win 4–1

Game	Date	Score	Opponent	Series	Recap
1	May 12, 2001	4–1	St. Louis Blues	Avalanche lead 1–0	W
2	May 14, 2001	4–2	St. Louis Blues	Avalanche lead 2–0	W
3	May 16, 2001	3–4 2OT	@ St. Louis Blues	Avalanche lead 2–1	L
4	May 18, 2001	4–3 OT	@ St. Louis Blues	Avalanche lead 3–1	W
5	May 21, 2001	2–1 OT	St. Louis Blues	Avalanche win 4–1	W

Stanley Cup Final vs. (E1) New Jersey Devils – Avalanche win 4–3

Game	Date	Score	Opponent	Series	Recap
1	May 26, 2001	5–0	New Jersey Devils	Avalanche lead 1–0	W
2	May 29, 2001	1–2	New Jersey Devils	Series tied 1–1	L
3	May 31, 2001	3–1	@ New Jersey Devils	Avalanche lead 2–1	W
4	June 2, 2001	2–3	@ New Jersey Devils	Series tied 2–2	L
5	June 4, 2001	1–4	New Jersey Devils	Devils lead 3–2	L
6	June 7, 2001	4–0	@ New Jersey Devils	Series tied 3–3	W
7	June 9, 2001	3–1	New Jersey Devils	Avalanche win 4–3	W

Legend: W Win L Loss

== Player statistics ==
=== Scoring ===
- Position abbreviations: C = Center; D = Defense; G = Goaltender; LW = Left wing; RW = Right wing
- † = Joined team via a transaction (e.g., trade, waivers, signing) during the season. Stats reflect time with the Avalanche only.
- ‡ = Left team via a transaction (e.g., trade, waivers, release) during the season. Stats reflect time with the Avalanche only.

No.	Player	Pos	Regular season						Playoffs					
No.	Player	Pos	GP	G	A	Pts	+/-	PIM	GP	G	A	Pts	+/-	PIM
19	Joe Sakic	C	82	54	64	118	45	30	21	13	13	26	6	6
21	Peter Forsberg	C	73	27	62	89	23	54	11	4	10	14	5	6
23	Milan Hejduk	RW	80	41	38	79	32	36	23	7	16	23	8	6
40	Alex Tanguay	LW	82	27	50	77	35	37	23	6	15	21	13	8
37	Chris Drury	LW	71	24	41	65	6	47	23	11	5	16	5	4
77	Ray Bourque	D	80	7	52	59	25	48	21	4	6	10	9	12
25	Shjon Podein	RW	82	15	17	32	7	68	23	2	3	5	3	14
18	Adam Deadmarsh‡	RW	39	13	13	26	−2	59	—	—	—	—	—	—
41	Martin Skoula	D	82	8	17	25	8	38	23	1	4	5	1	8
39	Ville Nieminen	LW	50	14	8	22	8	38	23	4	6	10	−1	20
7	Greg de Vries	D	79	5	12	17	23	51	23	0	1	1	5	20
13	Dan Hinote	C	76	5	10	15	1	51	23	2	4	6	4	21
24	Jon Klemm	D	78	4	11	15	22	54	22	1	2	3	7	16
52	Adam Foote	D	35	3	12	15	6	42	23	3	4	7	5	47
26	Stephane Yelle	C	50	4	10	14	−3	20	23	1	2	3	2	8
3	Aaron Miller‡	D	56	4	9	13	19	29	—	—	—	—	—	—
29	Eric Messier	LW/D	64	5	7	12	−3	26	23	2	2	4	0	14
4	Rob Blake†	D	13	2	8	10	11	8	23	6	13	19	6	16
14	Dave Reid	RW	73	1	9	10	1	21	18	0	4	4	2	6
28	Steven Reinprecht†	C	21	3	4	7	−1	2	22	2	3	5	0	2
27	Scott Parker	RW	69	2	3	5	−2	155	4	0	0	0	0	2
33	Patrick Roy	G	62	0	5	5		10	23	0	1	1		0
45	Rick Berry	D	19	0	4	4	5	38	—	—	—	—	—	—
44 (Note: Pratt wore number 4 until Blake was acquired.)	Nolan Pratt	D	46	1	2	3	2	40	—	—	—	—	—	—
11	Chris Dingman	LW	41	1	1	2	−3	108	16	0	4	4	3	14
1	David Aebischer	G	26	0	1	1		0	1	0	0	0		0
5	Alexei Gusarov‡	D	9	0	1	1	2	6	—	—	—	—	—	—
46	Yuri Babenko	C	3	0	0	0	0	0	—	—	—	—	—	—
9	Brad Larsen	LW	9	0	0	0	1	0	—	—	—	—	—	—
2	Bryan Muir†	D	8	0	0	0	0	4	3	0	0	0	0	0
63	Joel Prpic	C	3	0	0	0	0	2	—	—	—	—	—	—
44	Rob Shearer	C	2	0	0	0	−2	0	—	—	—	—	—	—

=== Goaltending ===
No.	Player	Regular season										Playoffs								
No.	Player	GP	W	L	T	SA	GA	GAA	SV%	SO	TOI	GP	W	L	SA	GA	GAA	SV%	SO	TOI
33	Patrick Roy	62	40	13	7	1513	132	2.22	.913	4	3585	23	16	7	622	41	1.70	.934	4	1451
1	David Aebischer	26	12	7	3	538	52	2.24	.903	3	1393	1	0	0	0	0	0.00		0	1

== Awards and records ==
=== Awards ===
Type	Award/honor	Recipient	Ref
League (annual)	Conn Smythe Trophy	Patrick Roy	
League (annual)	Hart Memorial Trophy	Joe Sakic	
League (annual)	King Clancy Memorial Trophy	Shjon Podein	
League (annual)	Lady Byng Memorial Trophy	Joe Sakic	
League (annual)	Lester B. Pearson Award	Joe Sakic	
League (annual)	NHL First All-Star Team	Ray Bourque (Defense)	
League (annual)	NHL First All-Star Team	Joe Sakic (Center)	
League (annual)	NHL Second All-Star Team	Rob Blake (Defense)	
League (annual)	NHL Plus-Minus Award	Joe Sakic (Note: Co-winner with Patrik Elias of the New Jersey Devils.)	
League (in-season)	NHL All-Star Game selection	Ray Bourque (Note: Bourque, Forsberg, Roy, and Sakic were all voted to the starting lineup.)	
League (in-season)	NHL All-Star Game selection	Peter Forsberg	
League (in-season)	NHL All-Star Game selection	Bob Hartley (coach)	
League (in-season)	NHL All-Star Game selection	Milan Hejduk (Note: Hejduk was an injury replacement for Alexander Mogilny of the New Jersey Devils.)	
League (in-season)	NHL All-Star Game selection	Patrick Roy	
League (in-season)	NHL All-Star Game selection	Joe Sakic	
League (in-season)	NHL Player of the Month	Joe Sakic (November)	
League (in-season)	NHL Player of the Week	Patrick Roy (October 16)	
League (in-season)	NHL Player of the Week	Alex Tanguay (January 22)	
League (in-season)	NHL Player of the Week	Peter Forsberg (February 26)	
League (in-season)	NHL Player of the Week	Joe Sakic (March 26)	
League (in-season)	NHL Player of the Week	Joe Sakic (April 9)	

=== Milestones ===
Milestone	Player	Date	Ref
First game	David Aebischer	October 18, 2000	
First game	Rob Shearer	November 11, 2000	
First game	Yuri Babenko	November 22, 2000	
First game	Rick Berry	January 7, 2001	

== Transactions ==
The Avalanche were involved in the following transactions from June 11, 2000, the day after the deciding game of the 2000 Stanley Cup Final, through June 9, 2001, the day of the deciding game of the 2001 Stanley Cup Final.

=== Trades ===
Date	Details		Ref
June 24, 2000	To Colorado Avalanche: Nolan Pratt; 1st-round pick in 2000; 2nd-round pick in 2000; Philadelphia’s 2nd-round pick in 2000	To Carolina Hurricanes: Sandis Ozolinsh; Columbus’ 2nd-round pick in 2000	
December 28, 2000	To Colorado Avalanche: 5th-round pick in 2001	To New York Rangers: Alexei Gusarov	
January 24, 2001	To Colorado Avalanche: Bryan Muir	To Tampa Bay Lightning: 8th-round pick in 2001	
February 22, 2001	To Colorado Avalanche: Rob Blake; Steven Reinprecht	To Los Angeles Kings: Adam Deadmarsh; Aaron Miller; 1st-round pick in 2001; Conditional draft pick (Note: 1st-round pick in 2003, contingent on Blake re-signing with the Avalanche, which he did on July 1, 2001.); A prospect to be named later (Note: Colorado sent the rights to Jared Aulin on March 22.)	
March 3, 2001	To Colorado Avalanche: Brent Thompson	To Florida Panthers: Future considerations	

=== Players acquired ===
Date	Player	Former team	Term	Via	Ref
August 2, 2000	Mike Craig	San Jose Sharks		Free agency	
August 29, 2000	Kelly Fairchild	Dallas Stars	1-year	Free agency	
August 29, 2000	Joel Prpic	Boston Bruins	1-year	Free agency	
September 5, 2000	Stewart Malgunas	Calgary Flames	1-year	Free agency	

=== Players lost ===
Date	Player	New team	Via (Note: In parentheses is the player's free agency group on July 1 if applicable.)	Ref
June 23, 2000	Jeff Odgers	Minnesota Wild	Expansion draft	
June 23, 2000	Rick Tabaracci	Columbus Blue Jackets	Expansion draft	
July 11, 2000	Christian Matte	Minnesota Wild	Free agency (VI)	
July 12, 2000	Sami Helenius	Dallas Stars	Free agency (VI)	
July 13, 2000	Dave Andreychuk	Buffalo Sabres	Free agency (III)	
July 20, 2000	Serge Aubin	Columbus Blue Jackets	Free agency (VI)	
August 24, 2000	Michael Gaul	Columbus Blue Jackets	Free agency (VI)	
September 4, 2000	Jason Bowen	Belfast Giants (BISL)	Free agency (UFA)	
March 24, 2001	Stewart Malgunas	Frankfurt Lions (DEL)	Free agency (Note: Contract for the 2001–02 season.)	

=== Signings ===
Date	Player	Term	Contract type	Ref
June 14, 2000	Ray Bourque	1-year (Note: Option for a second year.)	Re-signing	
July 26, 2000	Eric Messier	1-year	Re-signing	
July 26, 2000	Stephane Yelle	3-year	Re-signing	
August 2, 2000	Frederic Cassivi	2-year	Re-signing	
August 2, 2000	Dan Hinote	2-year	Re-signing	
August 2, 2000	Ville Nieminen	2-year	Re-signing	
August 2, 2000	Dan Smith	1-year	Re-signing	
August 2, 2000	Brian White	1-year	Re-signing	
August 9, 2000	Nolan Pratt	1-year	Arbitration award	
August 13, 2000	Jon Klemm	1-year	Arbitration award	
August 14, 2000	Joe Sakic	1-year	Re-signing	
August 15, 2000	Adam Deadmarsh	3-year	Re-signing	
September 5, 2000	Brad Larsen	1-year	Re-signing	
September 6, 2000	Milan Hejduk	4-year	Re-signing	
September 16, 2000	Chris Drury	3-year	Re-signing	
September 27, 2000	Adam Foote	4-year	Extension	
December 18, 2000	Jordan Krestanovich	3-year	Entry-level	
April 2, 2001	Mikhail Kuleshov	3-year	Entry-level	
April 26, 2001	Václav Nedorost	3-year	Entry-level	

== Draft picks ==
Colorado's draft picks at the 2000 NHL entry draft held at the Pengrowth Saddledome in Calgary, Alberta.

Round	#	Player	Nationality	College/Junior/Club team (League)
1	14	Václav Nedorost	Czech Republic	Ceske Budejovice Jr. (Czech Republic)
2	47	Jared Aulin	Canada	Kamloops Blazers (WHL)
2	50	Sergei Soin	Russia	Krylya Sovetov (Russia)
2	63	Agris Saviels	Latvia	Owen Sound Attack (OHL)
3	88	Kurt Sauer	United States	Spokane Chiefs (WHL)
3	92	Sergei Klyazmin	Russia	THK Tver (Russia)
4	119	Brian Fahey	United States	University of Wisconsin-Madison (WCHA)
5	159	John-Michael Liles	United States	Michigan State University (CCHA)
6	189	Chris Bahen	United States	Clarkson University (ECAC)
7	221	Aaron Molnar	Canada	London Knights (OHL)
8	252	Darryl Bootland	Canada	Toronto St. Michael's Majors (OHL)
9	266	Sean Kotary	United States	Northwood Prep High School (USHS-MA)
9	285	Blake Ward	Canada	Tri-City Americans (WHL)
