= Dan LaCouture =

American ice hockey player

- Born: April 18, 1977 (age 49) Hyannis, Massachusetts, U.S.
- Height: 6 ft 2 in (188 cm)
- Weight: 215 lb (98 kg; 15 st 5 lb)
- Position: Left wing
- Shot: Left
- Played for: Edmonton Oilers; Pittsburgh Penguins; New York Rangers; HC Davos; Boston Bruins; New Jersey Devils; HC Lugano; Carolina Hurricanes; Barys Astana; Lørenskog IK
- National team: United States
- NHL draft: 29th overall, 1996; New York Islanders
- Playing career: 1997–2011

Daniel Scott LaCouture (born April 18, 1977) is an American former professional ice hockey left winger who played in the National Hockey League (NHL). LaCouture is a graduate of South Hadley High School, in South Hadley, Massachusetts.

== Playing career ==
As a youth, LaCouture played in the 1991 Quebec International Pee-Wee Hockey Tournament with the Boston Bruins minor ice hockey team.

LaCouture was drafted 29th overall by the New York Islanders in the 1996 NHL entry draft. The Islanders traded LaCouture to the Edmonton Oilers for Mariusz Czerkawski on August 25, 1997. Initially, he played primarily for the Hamilton Bulldogs, Edmonton's American Hockey League affiliate, but became more of a regular in the NHL while playing for the Oilers in the 2000–01 season. On October 17, 2000, Dan scored his first career NHL goal against Andrew Raycroft and the Boston Bruins in a 6-1 Oilers victory.

The Pittsburgh Penguins dealt for LaCouture on March 13, 2001, sending Sven Butenschon to the Oilers. Lacouture had his most productive season, scoring six goals along with eleven assists, and playing in all 82 games in 2001–02. He played for Pittsburgh until 2003. On February 10 of that year he was traded along with Alexei Kovalev, Janne Laukkanen, and Mike Wilson to the New York Rangers in exchange for Joel Bouchard, Richard Lintner, Mikael Samuelsson, Rico Fata, and cash.

During the 2004–05 NHL lockout, the Providence Bruins signed LaCouture to a contract. He played for the NHL's Boston Bruins and Switzerland's HC Davos in 2005–06. An unrestricted free agent in the 2006 offseason, LaCouture signed with the New Jersey Devils, playing in six games with the NHL club and thirty-nine with the Lowell Devils of the AHL. He signed with the Anaheim Ducks in 2007, but was suspended by the team after he failed to report to Anaheim's AHL affiliate in Portland, Maine. LaCouture returned to the Swiss League and played 15 games for HC Lugano in the 2007–08 season. After a tryout that made an impression on the Hurricanes organization, he signed a one-year, two-way contract with Carolina Hurricanes of the NHL. He was called to Albany River Rats, but left the club on December 27, 2008, and signed a contract with Barys Astana of the KHL.

He completed his final professional season with Norwegian club Lørenskog IK, of the GET-ligaen, in 2011.

On April 10, 2014, LaCouture was revealed as one of nine former NHL players to file a major class action lawsuit against the NHL, alleging that the league has generated billions of dollars while subjecting its players to "the imminent risk of head trauma" leading to "devastating and long-term negative health consequences."

== Career statistics ==
=== Regular season and playoffs ===
			Regular season					Playoffs
Season	Team	League	GP	G	A	Pts	PIM	GP	G	A	Pts	PIM
1992–93	Natick High School	HS-MA	20	38	34	72	46	—	—	—	—	—
1993–94	Natick High School	HS-MA	21	52	49	101	58	—	—	—	—	—
1994–95	Springfield Olympics	NEJHL	52	44	56	100	98	—	—	—	—	—
1995–96	Springfield Olympics	NEJHL	29	24	35	59	79	13	12	13	25	23
1996–97	Boston University	HE	31	13	12	25	18	—	—	—	—	—
1997–98	Hamilton Bulldogs	AHL	77	15	10	25	31	5	1	0	1	0
1998–99	Hamilton Bulldogs	AHL	72	17	14	31	73	9	2	1	3	2
1998–99	Edmonton Oilers	NHL	3	0	0	0	0	—	—	—	—	—
1999–00	Hamilton Bulldogs	AHL	70	23	17	40	85	6	2	1	3	0
1999–00	Edmonton Oilers	NHL	5	0	0	0	10	1	0	0	0	0
2000–01	Edmonton Oilers	NHL	37	2	4	6	29	—	—	—	—	—
2000–01	Pittsburgh Penguins	NHL	11	0	0	0	14	5	0	0	0	2
2001–02	Pittsburgh Penguins	NHL	82	6	11	17	71	—	—	—	—	—
2002–03	Pittsburgh Penguins	NHL	44	2	2	4	72	—	—	—	—	—
2002–03	New York Rangers	NHL	24	1	4	5	0	—	—	—	—	—
2003–04	New York Rangers	NHL	59	5	2	7	82	—	—	—	—	—
2004–05	Providence Bruins	AHL	64	12	15	27	52	6	1	1	2	4
2005–06	HC Davos	NLA	4	2	1	3	4	—	—	—	—	—
2005–06	Boston Bruins	NHL	55	2	2	4	53	—	—	—	—	—
2006–07	Lowell Devils	AHL	39	8	3	11	33	—	—	—	—	—
2006–07	New Jersey Devils	NHL	6	0	0	0	7	—	—	—	—	—
2007–08	HC Lugano	NLA	15	1	1	2	18	—	—	—	—	—
2008–09	Carolina Hurricanes	NHL	11	2	0	2	10	—	—	—	—	—
2008–09	Albany River Rats	AHL	12	1	5	6	7	—	—	—	—	—
2008–09	Barys Astana	KHL	12	2	1	3	51	3	0	0	0	0
2009–10	Providence Bruins	AHL	9	2	0	2	7	—	—	—	—	—
2010–11	Lørenskog IK	NOR	30	16	13	29	18	—	—	—	—	—
AHL totals			343	77	64	141	280	26	6	3	9	6
NHL totals			337	20	25	45	348	6	0	0	0	2

=== International ===
Year	Team	Event	GP	G	A	Pts	PIM
1997	United States	WJC	6	1	0	1	4
2002	United States	WC	7	2	2	4	0
Junior totals			6	1	0	1	4
Senior totals			7	2	2	4	0
