= Milan Kraft =

Czech ice hockey player (born 1980)

- Born: 17 January 1980 (age 46) Plzeň, Czechoslovakia
- Height: 6 ft 4 in (193 cm)
- Weight: 212 lb (96 kg; 15 st 2 lb)
- Position: Centre
- Shot: Right
- Played for: HC Plzeň; Pittsburgh Penguins; HC Karlovy Vary; Avangard Omsk; HC Slavia Praha; KLH Chomutov
- National team: Czech Republic
- NHL draft: 23rd overall, 1998; Pittsburgh Penguins
- Playing career: 1996–2013

Milan Kraft (born 17 January 1980) is a Czech former professional ice hockey centre. He was drafted in the first round, 23rd overall, by the Pittsburgh Penguins in the 1998 NHL entry draft.

== Playing career ==
Starting his career as a youth with hometown team HC Plzeň (the club for which his father of the same name also played in the 1970s and 80s), Kraft played initially with the Prince Albert Raiders in 1998 after moving to North America. He appeared in 207 games over four seasons with the Penguins, with his most successful season coming in 2003–04 when he scored 19 goals and recorded 21 assists (it was also the only campaign that did not involve him spending some time with the Wilkes–Barre/Scranton Penguins).

This progress was halted by the 2004–05 NHL lockout, during which he returned to the Czech Republic to play for Plzeň and HC Energie Karlovy Vary. He also had a brief stint with Avangard Omsk of the Russian Super League before signing permanently with Karlovy Vary, remaining there until the end of the 2007–08 season and helping them reach the Extraliga finals that year only to be defeated by rivals HC Slavia Praha. He then moved to Slavia and quickly contributed to their winning the 2008–09 regular season Presidential Cup trophy – but they subsequently lost in the play-off finals to Karlovy Vary. Kraft spent the final four years of his career captaining KLH Chomutov (leading the team to promotion in 2012) until announcing his retirement at the conclusion of the 2012–13 season.

== Career statistics ==
=== Regular season and playoffs ===
			Regular season					Playoffs
Season	Team	League	GP	G	A	Pts	PIM	GP	G	A	Pts	PIM
1995–96	HC ZKZ Plzeň	CZE U18	49	54	41	95	—	—	—	—	—	—
1996–97	HC ZKZ Plzeň	CZE U20	36	26	17	43	—	—	—	—	—	—
1996–97	HC ZKZ Plzeň	ELH	9	0	1	1	2	—	—	—	—	—
1997–98	HC Keramika Plzeň	CZE U20	24	22	23	45	12	—	—	—	—	—
1997–98	HC Keramika Plzeň	ELH	16	0	5	5	0	1	0	0	0	0
1998–99	Prince Albert Raiders	WHL	68	40	46	86	32	14	7	13	20	6
1999–00	Prince Albert Raiders	WHL	56	34	35	69	42	6	4	1	5	4
2000–01	Pittsburgh Penguins	NHL	42	7	7	14	8	8	0	0	0	2
2000–01	Wilkes–Barre/Scranton Penguins	AHL	40	21	23	44	27	14	12	7	19	6
2001–02	Pittsburgh Penguins	NHL	68	8	8	16	16	—	—	—	—	—
2001–02	Wilkes–Barre/Scranton Penguins	AHL	8	4	4	8	10	—	—	—	—	—
2002–03	Pittsburgh Penguins	NHL	31	7	5	12	10	—	—	—	—	—
2002–03	Wilkes–Barre/Scranton Penguins	AHL	40	13	24	37	28	6	2	4	6	4
2003–04	Pittsburgh Penguins	NHL	66	19	21	40	18	—	—	—	—	—
2004–05	HC Lasselsberger Plzeň	ELH	17	2	4	6	6	—	—	—	—	—
2004–05	HC Energie Karlovy Vary	ELH	35	9	10	19	20	—	—	—	—	—
2005–06	Avangard Omsk	RSL	28	2	5	7	14	—	—	—	—	—
2005–06	HC Energie Karlovy Vary	ELH	19	7	5	12	16	—	—	—	—	—
2006–07	HC Energie Karlovy Vary	ELH	25	6	3	9	28	3	0	0	0	8
2007–08	HC Energie Karlovy Vary	ELH	29	8	4	12	37	19	4	1	5	63
2008–09	HC Slavia Praha	ELH	21	2	4	6	2	—	—	—	—	—
2009–10	KLH Chomutov	CZE–2	38	15	28	43	36	16	6	13	19	22
2010–11	KLH Chomutov	CZE–2	34	14	23	37	10	13	5	8	13	12
2011–12	Piráti Chomutov	CZE–2	50	23	33	56	18	19	4	9	13	4
2012–13	Piráti Chomutov	ELH	45	9	11	20	12	—	—	—	—	—
ELH totals			216	43	47	90	123	28	4	3	7	77
NHL totals			207	41	41	82	52	8	0	0	0	2

=== International ===
Year	Team	Event	GP	G	A	Pts	PIM
1998	Czech Republic	EJC	6	5	3	8	6
2000	Czech Republic	WJC	7	5	7	12	0
2004	Czech Republic	WC	7	1	1	2	2
Junior totals			13	10	10	20	6

Preceded by Róbert Döme	Pittsburgh Penguins first-round draft pick 1998	Succeeded by Konstantin Koltsov
