= Dale Clarke =

Canadian ice hockey player

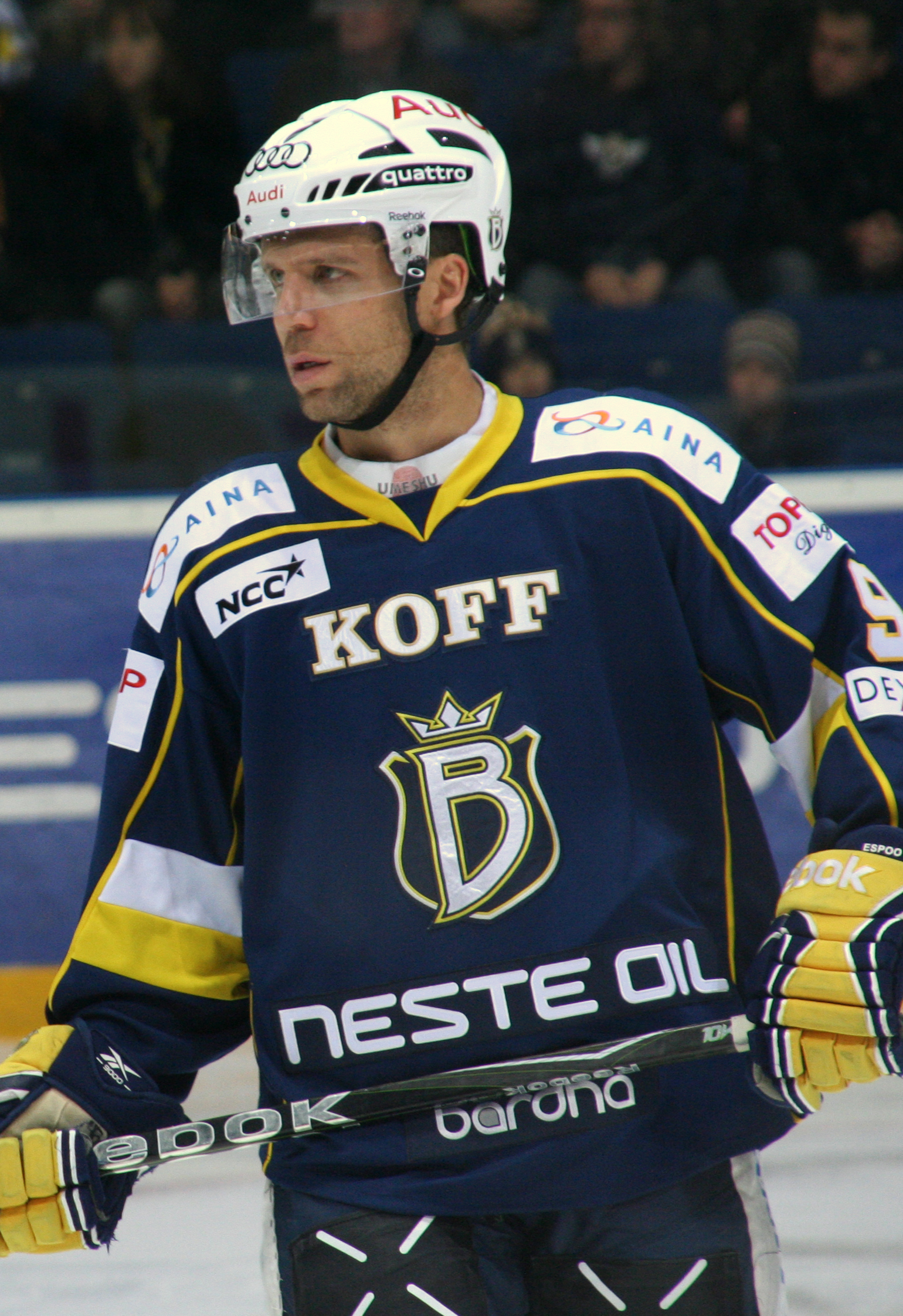
- Born: March 23, 1978 (age 47) Sarnia, Ontario, Canada
- Height: 6 ft 2 in (188 cm)
- Weight: 193 lb (88 kg; 13 st 11 lb)
- Position: Defence
- Shot: Right
- SM-liiga team Former teams: Tappara; St. Louis Blues; Wolfsburg Grizzly Adams; Kassel Huskies; Espoo Blues; HIFK; Brynäs IF
- NHL draft: Undrafted
- Playing career: 2000–2013

Dale Clarke (born March 23, 1978) is a former Canadian professional ice hockey defenceman.

Clarke played three games in the National Hockey League (NHL) for the St. Louis Blues. He previously played in Finland for Espoo Blues, HIFK and in Germany's Deutsche Eishockey Liga (DEL) for the Wolfsburg Grizzly Adams and the Kassel Huskies.

== Playing career ==
As a youth, Clarke played in the 1992 Quebec International Pee-Wee Hockey Tournament with the Quinte minor ice hockey team from Belleville, Ontario.

Clarke played junior hockey for the Wellington Dukes of the Metro Toronto Junior Hockey League (MTHL) from 1994 until 1996. He attended St. Lawrence University and played four seasons from 1996 until 2000. In 2000, he signed with the St. Louis Blues of the National Hockey League (NHL) and joined their American Hockey League (AHL) affiliate the Worcester IceCats in time for the playoffs.

He played two seasons for the IceCats and had a three-game call-up to the Blues. In 2002–03 he was traded by the Blues to the Colorado Avalanche organization, joining their AHL affiliate Hershey Bears. He then split time with the Cincinnati Mighty Ducks of the AHL to end the season. From 2003 to his retirement, he played in Europe for teams in Finland and Germany.

On January 16, 2013, Clarke signed a contract midway through the 2012–13 season to return for a third stint with Tappara of the Finnish SM-liiga.

== Career statistics ==
			Regular season					Playoffs
Season	Team	League	GP	G	A	Pts	PIM	GP	G	A	Pts	PIM
1994–95	Wellington Dukes	MetJHL	48	2	13	15	18	—	—	—	—	—
1995–96	Wellington Dukes	MetJHL	51	6	24	30	78	—	—	—	—	—
1996–97	St. Lawrence University	ECAC	34	1	6	7	20	—	—	—	—	—
1997–98	St. Lawrence University	ECAC	33	1	6	7	66	—	—	—	—	—
1998–99	St. Lawrence University	ECAC	39	3	13	16	44	—	—	—	—	—
1999–00	St. Lawrence University	ECAC	36	6	17	23	24	—	—	—	—	—
1999–00	Worcester IceCats	AHL	—	—	—	—	—	2	0	0	0	0
2000–01	Worcester IceCats	AHL	67	7	25	32	26	1	0	0	0	0
2000–01	Peoria Rivermen	ECHL	2	1	0	1	0	—	—	—	—	—
2000–01	St. Louis Blues	NHL	3	0	0	0	0	—	—	—	—	—
2001–02	Worcester IceCats	AHL	72	2	10	12	32	—	—	—	—	—
2002–03	Hershey Bears	AHL	33	1	5	6	12	—	—	—	—	—
2002–03	Cincinnati Mighty Ducks	AHL	13	1	6	7	6	—	—	—	—	—
2003–04	Tappara	SM-l	48	2	3	5	55	3	0	0	0	0
2004–05	Wolfsburg Grizzly Adams	DEL	49	3	10	13	54	—	—	—	—	—
2005–06	Kassel Huskies	DEL	52	5	12	17	44	—	—	—	—	—
2006–07	Tappara	SM-l	56	13	20	33	63	5	0	1	1	2
2007–08	Blues	SM-l	26	3	15	18	42	9	1	5	6	10
2008–09	Blues	SM-l	43	7	12	19	30	4	1	1	2	4
2009–10	HIFK	SM-l	55	8	17	25	34	6	0	3	3	4
2010–11	Brynäs IF	SEL	53	4	14	18	34	5	0	1	1	4
2011–12	Blues	SM-l	36	3	8	11	22	14	1	1	2	12
SM-liiga totals			264	36	75	111	246	41	3	11	14	32
NHL totals			3	0	0	0	0	—	—	—	—	—

== Transactions ==
- July 24, 1999 - Signed as a free agent by the St. Louis Blues
- December 5, 2002 - Traded to Colorado by St. Louis for future considerations.
- April 16, 2010 - Signed a contract with Brynäs IF
- November 18, 2011 - Signed a contract with Espoo Blues
- January 16, 2013 - Signed a contract with Tappara
