= Reed Low =

Canadian ice hockey player

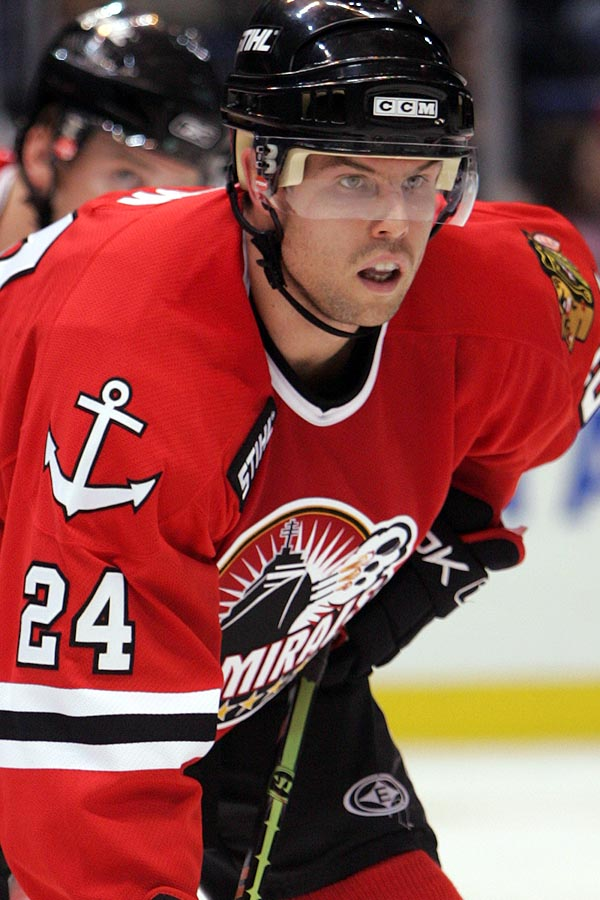
- Low with the Norfolk Admirals in 2007
- Born: June 21, 1976 (age 49) Moose Jaw, Saskatchewan, Canada
- Height: 6 ft 4 in (193 cm)
- Weight: 235 lb (107 kg; 16 st 11 lb)
- Position: Right wing
- Shot: Right
- Played for: St. Louis Blues; Chicago Blackhawks
- NHL draft: 177th overall, 1996; St. Louis Blues
- Playing career: 1998–2007

Reed Low (born June 21, 1976) is a Canadian former professional ice hockey player who played in the National Hockey League for five seasons. Low was known primarily for his role as an enforcer. Low twice accumulated over 50 penalty minutes in a single game (57 vs Calgary February 28, 2002, and 53 vs Detroit December 31, 2002).

Born in Moose Jaw, Saskatchewan, Reed has four children – one daughter and three sons – and currently resides in suburban St. Louis.

== Career statistics ==
			Regular season					Playoffs
Season	Team	League	GP	G	A	Pts	PIM	GP	G	A	Pts	PIM
1994–95	Regina Pats	WHL	2	0	0	0	5	—	—	—	—	—
1995–96	Moose Jaw Warriors	WHL	61	12	7	19	221	—	—	—	—	—
1996–97	Moose Jaw Warriors	WHL	62	16	11	27	228	12	2	1	3	50
1997–98	Worcester IceCats	AHL	17	1	1	2	75	3	0	0	0	0
1997–98	Baton Rouge Kingfish	ECHL	39	4	2	6	145	—	—	—	—	—
1998–99	Worcester IceCats	AHL	77	5	6	11	239	4	0	0	0	2
1999–00	Worcester IceCats	AHL	80	12	16	28	203	9	1	3	4	16
2000–01	St. Louis Blues	NHL	56	1	5	6	159	—	—	—	—	—
2001–02	St. Louis Blues	NHL	58	0	5	5	160	—	—	—	—	—
2002–03	St. Louis Blues	NHL	79	2	4	6	234	—	—	—	—	—
2003–04	St. Louis Blues	NHL	57	0	2	2	141	—	—	—	—	—
2005–06	Peoria Rivermen	AHL	20	3	5	8	40	—	—	—	—	—
2005–06	Missouri River Otters	UHL	4	2	1	3	13	—	—	—	—	—
2006–07	Chicago Blackhawks	NHL	6	0	0	0	31	—	—	—	—	—
2006–07	Norfolk Admirals	AHL	58	4	6	10	64	5	1	0	1	6
NHL totals			256	3	16	19	725	—	—	—	—	—

== Playing career ==
- June 22, 1996 – Drafted by the St. Louis Blues 177th overall in the 1996 NHL entry draft
- July 27, 2006 – Signed as a free agent by the Chicago Blackhawks
- November 3, 2006 – Sent to the minors
