= Greg Davis (ice hockey) =

Canadian ice hockey player

- Born: July 26, 1979 (age 46) Calgary, Alberta, Canada
- Height: 6 ft 4 in (193 cm)
- Weight: 195 lb (88 kg; 13 st 13 lb)
- Position: Right wing
- Shot: Right
- Played for: AHL; Worcester IceCats; ECHL; Peoria Rivermen; LNAH; St. Jean Mission; St. Hyacinthe Cousin; St. Hyacinthe Cristal
- NHL draft: Undrafted
- Playing career: 2001–2006

Greg Davis (born July 26, 1979) is a Canadian former professional ice hockey player.

Davis was born in Calgary, and played junior hockey with the Olds Grizzlys in the Alberta Junior Hockey League before attending McGill University. He played two seasons (1999–2001) of CIAU hockey with the McGill Redmen, scoring scored 38 goals and 39 assists for 68 points while earning 48 penalty minutes in 48 games played.

On May 5, 2001, Davis was signed as a free agent by the St. Louis Blues of the National Hockey League. He went on to play five seasons of professional hockey, including 111 games played in the American Hockey League with the Worcester IceCats. Davis hung up his skates following the 2005–06 season spent with Saint-Hyacinthe Cristal of the Ligue Nord-Américaine de Hockey.
