= Rob Shearer =

Canadian ice hockey player

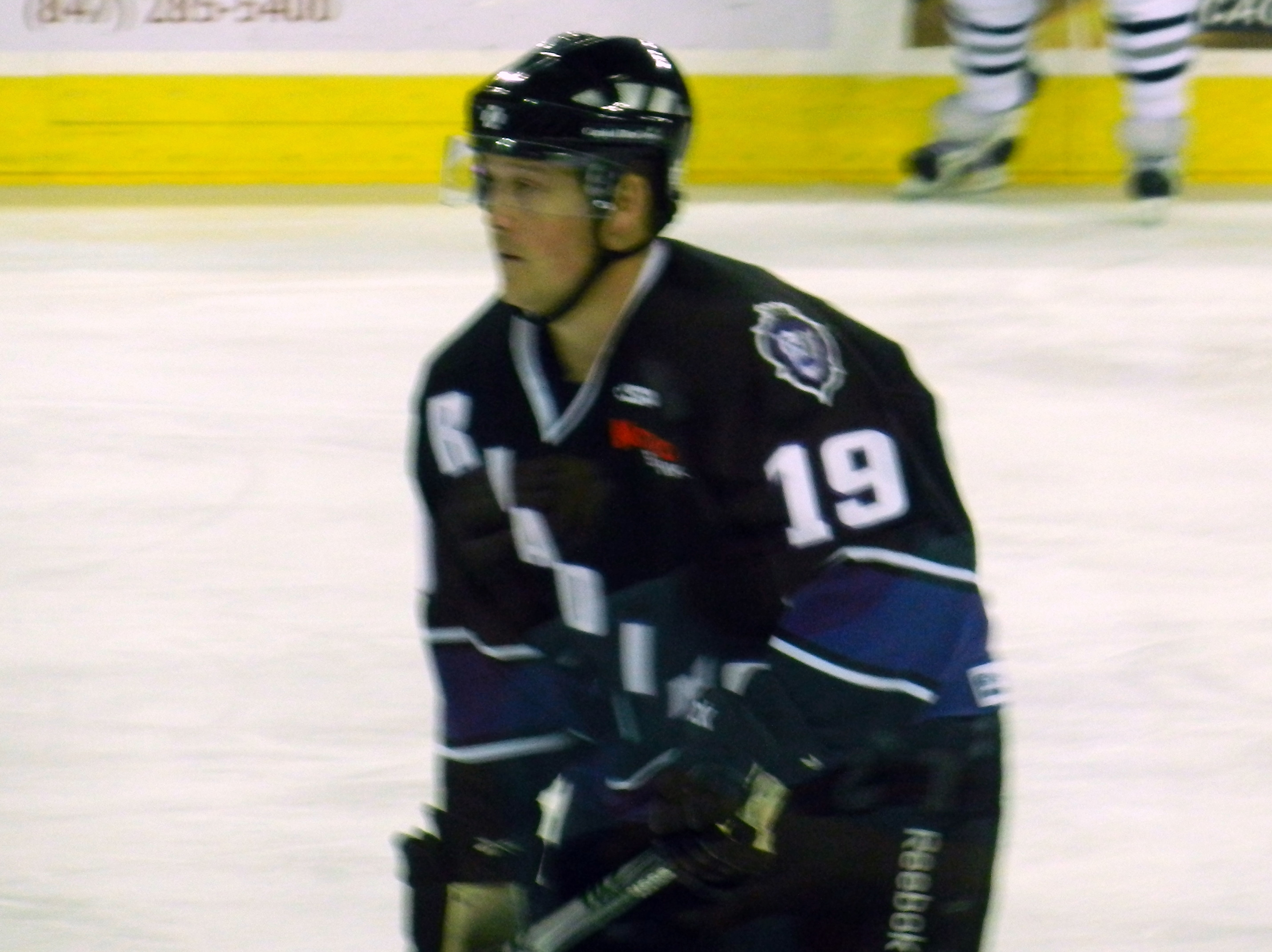
- Born: October 19, 1976 (age 48); Kitchener, Ontario, Canada
- Height: 5 ft 9 in (175 cm)
- Weight: 187 lb (85 kg; 13 st 5 lb)
- Position: Centre
- Shot: Right
- Played for: Colorado Avalanche; TPS Turku; Eisbären Berlin; EHC Black Wings Linz; Villacher SV
- NHL draft: Undrafted
- Playing career: 1996–2012

Robert C. Shearer (born October 19, 1976 in Kitchener, Ontario) is a former professional ice hockey player, who last played for EC VSV in the Austrian Hockey League (EBEL). In 1995 he was signed as a free agent by the Colorado Avalanche and he played 2 games for the team in 2000–01. After 10 seasons abroad in Europe, Shearer returned to North America for the 2011–12 season, signing a one-year contract with the Reading Royals of the ECHL. After scoring 15 point in 34 games, on January 13, 2012, Shearer returned to Austria signing for the remainder of the year with Villacher SV.

== Career statistics ==
=== Regular season and playoffs ===
			Regular season					Playoffs
Season	Team	League	GP	G	A	Pts	PIM	GP	G	A	Pts	PIM
1993–94	Windsor Spitfires	OHL	66	17	25	42	46	4	0	2	2	6
1994–95	Windsor Spitfires	OHL	59	28	28	56	48	10	4	4	8	10
1995–96	Windsor Spitfires	OHL	63	40	53	93	74	7	6	3	9	8
1996–97	Hershey Bears	AHL	78	12	16	28	88	23	0	4	4	9
1997–98	Hershey Bears	AHL	79	30	30	60	44	7	0	5	5	6
1998–99	Hershey Bears	AHL	77	24	42	66	43	3	0	0	0	6
1999–00	Hershey Bears	AHL	70	21	46	67	55	14	1	7	8	10
2000–01	Hershey Bears	AHL	73	18	34	52	64	12	1	3	4	0
2000–01	Colorado Avalanche	NHL	2	0	0	0	0	—	—	—	—	—
2001–02	TPS	SM-l	56	24	16	40	56	8	1	2	3	10
2002–03	Eisbären Berlin	DEL	49	18	17	35	20	9	4	4	8	10
2003–04	Eisbären Berlin	DEL	51	12	27	39	30	11	1	3	4	6
2004–05	Eisbären Berlin	DEL	51	9	18	27	53	12	1	5	6	2
2005–06	EHC Linz	EBEL	48	19	33	52	71	—	—	—	—	—
2006–07	EHC Linz	EBEL	56	26	46	72	46	3	4	1	5	4
2007–08	EHC Linz	EBEL	46	20	27	47	16	11	5	3	8	0
2008–09	EHC Linz	EBEL	48	6	33	39	67	10	2	3	5	10
2009–10	EHC Linz	EBEL	51	17	36	53	43	18	9	13	22	18
2010–11	EHC Linz	EBEL	42	15	20	35	16	3	0	1	1	6
2011–12	Reading Royals	ECHL	34	4	11	15	10	—	—	—	—	—
2011–12	Villacher SV	EBEL	10	3	4	7	4	—	—	—	—	—
AHL totals			377	105	168	273	294	59	2	19	21	31
NHL totals			2	0	0	0	0	—	—	—	—	—
