= 2000–01 Calgary Flames season =

NHL team season

2000–01 Calgary Flames
- Division: 4th Northwest
- Conference: 11th Western
- 2000–01 record: 27–36–15–4
- Home record: 12–18–9–2
- Road record: 15–18–6–2
- Goals for: 197
- Goals against: 236

Team information
- General manager: Craig Button
- Coach: Don Hay (Oct.–Mar.); Greg Gilbert (Mar.–Apr.)
- Captain: Steve Smith (Oct.–Dec.); Dave Lowry (Dec.–Apr.)
- Arena: Pengrowth Saddledome
- Average attendance: 16,623
- Minor league affiliates: Saint John Flames; Johnstown Chiefs

Team leaders
- Goals: Jarome Iginla (31)
- Assists: Marc Savard (42)
- Points: Jarome Iginla (71)
- Penalty minutes: Jason Wiemer (177)
- Plus/minus: Oleg Saprykin (+4); Ron Sutter (+4)
- Wins: Fred Brathwaite (15)
- Goals against average: Fred Brathwaite (2.32)

The 2000–01 Calgary Flames season was the 21st season in Calgary. It was a season for change, as the Flames let longtime general manager Al Coates go shortly before the draft and replaced him with highly touted Craig Button, previously with the Dallas Stars. The team also let head coach Brian Sutter go and replaced him with rookie coach Don Hay. Hay would only last 68 games before being fired and replaced by Greg Gilbert.

The off-season also featured a "Save the Flames" ticket drive campaign, as owners warned that the team could be sold in the face of declining attendance and the pressures of doing business in American dollars while earning revenues in Canadian dollars. The threats brought fears of the Flames moving south, as the Quebec Nordiques and Winnipeg Jets had done in previous seasons. The goal was to increase the Flames' season-ticket base from its 1999–2000 low of 8,700 to 14,000. The drive was ultimately successful, with the team reaching its ticket goal and acquiring a new title sponsor for their home arena, the Saddledome, as Pengrowth Management took over the naming rights from the defunct Canadian Airlines.

On the ice, the Flames continued to struggle, failing to win more than three consecutive games at any point. While their top three forwards, Jarome Iginla, Valeri Bure, and Marc Savard, scored 91 goals between them, only two other players even reached double-digit goals on the season. Calgary finished with a 27–36–15–4 record, fourth in the division and ahead of only the expansion Minnesota Wild. The Flames missed the playoffs for the fifth straight season.

The 2000–01 season was also notable in retrospect, as the Flames lost two players who would later go on to stardom for virtually nothing. Ineffective forward Martin St. Louis was released as a free agent, while goaltender Jean-Sebastien Giguere was dealt to the Mighty Ducks of Anaheim for a 2nd round draft pick when the Flames found themselves with too many goaltenders heading into the 2000 NHL expansion draft.

In the expansion draft, which was held in Calgary, the Flames lost defenceman Filip Kuba to the Minnesota Wild, 15th overall, and Sergei Krivokrasov, also to the Wild, 32nd overall. The Columbus Blue Jackets did not select a player off of Calgary's roster.

== Regular season ==
On December 7, team captain Steve Smith retired and Dave Lowry was named his replacement.

The Flames had the most power-play opportunities of all 30 teams, with 435.

=== Season standings ===
Northwest Division
No.	CR		GP	W	L	T	OTL	GF	GA	Pts
1	1	**Colorado Avalanche**	82	52	16	10	4	270	192	118
2	6	**Edmonton Oilers**	82	39	28	12	3	243	222	93
3	8	**Vancouver Canucks**	82	36	28	11	7	239	238	90
4	11	Calgary Flames	82	27	36	15	4	197	236	73
5	14	Minnesota Wild	82	25	39	13	5	168	210	68

Note: CR = Conference rank; GP = Games played; W = Wins; L = Losses; T = Ties; OTL = Overtime loss; GF = Goals for; GA = Goals against; Pts = Points
Bolded teams qualified for the playoffs.

Western Conference
R		Div	GP	W	L	T	OTL	GF	GA	Pts
**1**	**p – Colorado Avalanche**	**NW**	**82**	**52**	**16**	**10**	**4**	**270**	**192**	**118**
**2**	**y – Detroit Red Wings**	**CEN**	**82**	**49**	**20**	**9**	**4**	**253**	**202**	**111**
**3**	**y – Dallas Stars**	**PAC**	**82**	**48**	**24**	**8**	**2**	**241**	**187**	**106**
**4**	**St. Louis Blues**	**CEN**	**82**	**43**	**22**	**12**	**5**	**249**	**195**	**103**
**5**	**San Jose Sharks**	**PAC**	**82**	**40**	**27**	**12**	**3**	**217**	**192**	**95**
**6**	**Edmonton Oilers**	**NW**	**82**	**39**	**28**	**12**	**3**	**243**	**222**	**93**
**7**	**Los Angeles Kings**	**PAC**	**82**	**38**	**28**	**13**	**3**	**252**	**228**	**92**
**8**	**Vancouver Canucks**	**NW**	**82**	**36**	**28**	**11**	**7**	**239**	**238**	**90**
8.5
9	Phoenix Coyotes	PAC	82	35	27	17	3	214	212	90
10	Nashville Predators	CEN	82	34	36	9	3	186	200	80
11	Calgary Flames	NW	82	27	36	15	4	197	236	73
12	Chicago Blackhawks	CEN	82	29	40	8	5	210	246	71
13	Columbus Blue Jackets	CEN	82	28	39	9	6	190	233	71
14	Minnesota Wild	NW	82	25	39	13	5	168	210	68
15	Mighty Ducks of Anaheim	PAC	82	25	41	11	5	188	245	66

Divisions: CEN – Central, PAC – Pacific, NW – Northwest

bold – Qualified for playoffs; p – Won Presidents' Trophy; y – Won division

== Schedule and results ==
2000–01 regular season
October: 3–8–1–0 (home: 1–5–1–0; road: 2–3–0–0)

Game	Date	Visitor	Score	Home	OT	Record	Pts	Recap
1	October 5	Detroit	5 – 3	Calgary		0–1–0–0	0	L
2	October 10	Colorado	3 – 1	Calgary		0–2–0–0	0	L
3	October 12	Columbus	3 – 2	Calgary		0–3–0–0	0	L
4	October 14	Calgary	2 – 0	NY Islanders		1–3–0–0	2	W
5	October 15	Calgary	4 – 2	Detroit		2–3–0–0	4	W
6	October 18	Calgary	1 – 4	Vancouver		2–4–0–0	4	L
7	October 20	Boston	2 – 3	Calgary		3–4–0–0	6	W
8	October 21	Toronto	2 – 1	Calgary		3–5–0–0	6	L
9	October 24	Phoenix	2 – 2	Calgary	OT	3–5–1–0	7	T
10	October 26	Calgary	3 – 4	St. Louis		3–6–1–0	7	L
11	October 27	Calgary	1 – 3	Minnesota		3–7–1–0	7	L
12	October 29	Anaheim	6 – 3	Calgary		3–8–1–0	7	L

November: 3–4–4–4 (home: 0–1–2–2; road: 3–3–2–2)

Game	Date	Visitor	Score	Home	OT	Record	Pts	Recap
13	November 1	Calgary	2 – 3	Edmonton		3–9–1–0	7	L
14	November 4	Pittsburgh	1 – 1	Calgary	OT	3–9–2–0	8	T
15	November 5	Minnesota	3 – 2	Calgary	OT	3–9–2–1	9	OTL
16	November 8	Calgary	1 – 0	Minnesota		4–9–2–1	11	W
17	November 10	Calgary	3 – 3	Florida	OT	4–9–3–1	12	T
18	November 11	Calgary	4 – 3	Tampa Bay		5–9–3–1	14	W
19	November 13	Calgary	2 – 3	Buffalo	OT	5–9–3–2	15	OTL
20	November 16	Chicago	5 – 2	Calgary		5–10–3–2	15	L
21	November 18	NY Rangers	5 – 4	Calgary	OT	5–10–3–3	16	OTL
22	November 19	Calgary	0 – 2	Edmonton		5–11–3–3	16	L
23	November 22	Calgary	1 – 1	Minnesota	OT	5–11–4–3	17	T
24	November 24	Anaheim	2 – 2	Calgary	OT	5–11–5–3	18	T
25	November 25	Calgary	2 – 3	Colorado	OT	5–11–5–4	19	OTL
26	November 28	Calgary	1 – 6	Nashville		5–12–5–4	19	L
27	November 29	Calgary	4 – 3	Dallas		6–12–5–4	21	W

December: 7–3–2–0 (home: 4–1–2–0; road: 3–2–0–0)

Game	Date	Visitor	Score	Home	OT	Record	Pts	Recap
28	December 2	Montreal	1 – 1	Calgary	OT	6–12–6–4	22	T
29	December 4	San Jose	8 – 0	Calgary		6–13–6–4	22	L
30	December 7	Nashville	0 – 3	Calgary		7–13–6–4	24	W
31	December 9	Carolina	2 – 7	Calgary		8–13–6–4	26	W
32	December 13	Calgary	3 – 1	Montreal		9–13–6–4	28	W
33	December 14	Calgary	2 – 4	Ottawa		9–14–6–4	28	L
34	December 16	Calgary	6 – 5	Toronto	OT	10–14–6–4	30	W
35	December 19	Calgary	3 – 0	Colorado		11–14–6–4	32	W
36	December 20	Calgary	2 – 4	Phoenix		11–15–6–4	32	L
37	December 22	Edmonton	1 – 1	Calgary	OT	11–15–7–4	33	T
38	December 29	Vancouver	0 – 5	Calgary		12–15–7–4	35	W
39	December 31	Montreal	4 – 5	Calgary	OT	13–15–7–4	37	W

January: 4–6–2–0 (home: 2–4–0–0; road: 2–2–2–0)

Game	Date	Visitor	Score	Home	OT	Record	Pts	Recap
40	January 3	Calgary	1 – 0	San Jose		14–15–7–4	39	W
41	January 5	Calgary	4 – 4	Anaheim	OT	14–15–8–4	40	T
42	January 6	Calgary	0 – 5	Los Angeles		14–16–8–4	40	L
43	January 11	Nashville	1 – 2	Calgary		15–16–8–4	42	W
44	January 13	Ottawa	5 – 2	Calgary		15–17–8–4	42	L
45	January 14	Calgary	1 – 5	Vancouver		15–18–8–4	42	L
46	January 17	Calgary	4 – 4	San Jose	OT	15–18–9–4	43	T
47	January 21	Detroit	2 – 4	Calgary		16–18–9–4	45	W
48	January 23	Phoenix	4 – 2	Calgary		16–19–9–4	45	L
49	January 25	Calgary	3 – 0	Los Angeles		17–19–9–4	47	W
50	January 27	Vancouver	5 – 3	Calgary		17–20–9–4	47	L
51	January 30	Edmonton	5 – 3	Calgary		17–21–9–4	47	L

February: 5–4–2–0 (home: 2–1–2–0; road: 3–3–0–0)

Game	Date	Visitor	Score	Home	OT	Record	Pts	Recap
52	February 1	Chicago	3 – 5	Calgary		18–21–9–4	49	W
53	February 6	San Jose	1 – 1	Calgary	OT	18–21–10–4	50	T
54	February 9	Calgary	5 – 3	Colorado		19–21–10–4	52	W
55	February 10	Calgary	4 – 1	Vancouver		20–21–10–4	54	W
56	February 13	Washington	4 – 4	Calgary	OT	20–21–11–4	55	T
57	February 15	Calgary	1 – 4	St. Louis		20–22–11–4	55	L
58	February 18	Calgary	4 – 1	Phoenix		21–22–11–4	57	T
59	February 19	Calgary	2 – 6	Anaheim		21–23–11–4	57	L
60	February 22	Calgary	0 – 2	Los Angeles		21–24–11–4	57	L
61	February 24	Edmonton	3 – 1	Calgary		21–25–11–4	57	L
62	February 26	Dallas	2 – 3	Calgary		22–25–11–4	59	W

March: 4–9–3–0 (home: 3–4–2–0; road: 1–5–1–0)

Game	Date	Visitor	Score	Home	OT	Record	Pts	Recap
63	March 1	Minnesota	1 – 1	Calgary	OT	22–25–12–4	60	T
64	March 3	St. Louis	2 – 3	Calgary	OT	23–25–12–4	62	W
65	March 6	Toronto	3 – 1	Calgary		23–26–12–4	62	L
66	March 8	Calgary	2 – 5	Philadelphia		23–27–12–4	62	L
67	March 10	Calgary	3 – 6	Pittsburgh		23–28–12–4	62	L
68	March 11	Calgary	3 – 3	Atlanta	OT	23–28–13–4	63	T
69	March 14	Calgary	0 – 3	Columbus		23–29–13–4	63	L
70	March 15	Calgary	2 – 5	Detroit		23–30–13–4	63	L
71	March 17	St. Louis	2 – 2	Calgary	OT	23–30–14–4	64	T
72	March 19	New Jersey	4 – 2	Calgary		23–31–14–4	64	L
73	March 22	Philadelphia	1 – 3	Calgary		24–31–14–4	66	W
74	March 24	Calgary	4 – 6	Columbus		24–32–14–4	66	L
75	March 25	Calgary	3 – 1	Chicago		25–32–14–4	68	W
76	March 27	Columbus	0 – 3	Calgary		26–32–14–4	70	W
77	March 29	Colorado	1 – 0	Calgary		26–33–14–4	70	L
78	March 31	Dallas	2 – 0	Calgary		26–34–14–4	70	L

April: 1–2–1–0 (home: 0–1–0–0; road: 1–1–1–0)

Game	Date	Visitor	Score	Home	OT	Record	Pts	Recap
79	April 2	Calgary	4 – 4	Dallas	OT	26–34–15–4	71	T
80	April 4	Calgary	5 – 2	Chicago		27–34–15–4	73	W
81	April 5	Calgary	0 – 4	Nashville		27–35–15–4	73	L
82	April 7	Los Angeles	3 – 2	Calgary		27–36–15–4	73	L

Legend: W Win (2 points) L Loss (0 points) T Tie (1 point) OTL Overtime loss (1 point)

== Player statistics ==
=== Scoring ===
- Position abbreviations: C = Centre; D = Defence; G = Goaltender; LW = Left wing; RW = Right wing
- † = Joined team via a transaction (e.g., trade, waivers, signing) during the season. Stats reflect time with the Flames only.
- ‡ = Left team via a transaction (e.g., trade, waivers, release) during the season. Stats reflect time with the Flames only.

No.	Player	Pos	Regular season					
No.	Player	Pos	GP	G	A	Pts	+/-	PIM
12	Jarome Iginla	RW	77	31	40	71	−2	62
27	Marc Savard	C	77	23	42	65	−12	46
8	Valeri Bure	RW	78	27	28	55	−21	26
16	Cory Stillman‡	LW	66	21	24	45	−6	45
10	Dave Lowry	LW	79	18	17	35	−2	47
6	Phil Housley	D	69	4	30	34	−15	24
53	Derek Morris	D	51	5	23	28	−15	56
19	Oleg Saprykin	RW	59	9	14	23	4	43
11	Jeff Shantz	C	73	5	15	20	−7	58
5	Tommy Albelin	D	77	1	19	20	2	22
32	Toni Lydman	D	62	3	16	19	−7	30
24	Jason Wiemer	C	65	10	5	15	−15	177
23	Clarke Wilm	C	81	7	8	15	−11	69
38	Jeff Cowan	LW	51	9	4	13	−8	74
18	Daniel Tkaczuk	C	19	4	7	11	1	14
22	Bill Lindsay‡	LW	52	1	9	10	−8	97
36	Ronald Petrovicky	RW	30	4	5	9	0	54
3	Denis Gauthier	D	62	2	6	8	3	78
25	Igor Kravchuk†	D	37	0	8	8	−12	4
22	Craig Conroy†	C	14	3	4	7	0	14
17	Chris Clark	RW	29	5	1	6	0	38
2	Brad Werenka	D	33	1	4	5	−3	16
39	Benoit Gratton	LW	14	1	3	4	0	14
21	Dwayne Hay	RW	49	1	3	4	−4	16
28	Robyn Regehr	D	71	1	3	4	−7	70
20	Ron Sutter†	C	21	1	3	4	4	12
55	Steve Smith‡	D	13	0	2	2	−2	17
25	Niklas Andersson	LW	11	0	1	1	0	4
40	Fred Brathwaite	G	49	0	1	1		2
4 (Note: Eakins wore number 26 in his first five games and then number 20 in his next three games.)	Dallas Eakins	D	17	0	1	1	−1	11
29	Mike Vernon	G	31	0	1	1		16
26	Steve Begin	C	4	0	0	0	0	0
4	Wade Belak‡	D	23	0	0	0	−2	79
15	Rico Fata	RW	5	0	0	0	−3	0
20	Marty Murray	C	7	0	0	0	−2	0

=== Goaltending ===
No.	Player	Regular season									
No.	Player	GP	W	L	T	SA	GA	GAA	SV%	SO	TOI
40	Fred Brathwaite	49	15	17	10	1181	106	2.32	.910	5	2742
29	Mike Vernon	41	12	23	5	1034	121	3.23	.883	3	2246

== Awards and records ==
=== Awards ===
Type	Award/honour	Recipient	Ref
Team	Molson Cup	Jarome Iginla	
Team	Ralph T. Scurfield Humanitarian Award	Jarome Iginla	

=== Milestones ===
Milestone	Player	Date	Ref
First game	Toni Lydman	October 5, 2000	
First game	Ronald Petrovicky	October 5, 2000	
First game	Daniel Tkaczuk	November 24, 2000	
25th shutout	Mike Vernon	December 7, 2000	

== Transactions ==
The Flames were involved in the following transactions from June 11, 2000, the day after the deciding game of the 2000 Stanley Cup Final, through June 9, 2001, the day of the deciding game of the 2001 Stanley Cup Final.

=== Trades ===
Date	Details		Ref
June 23, 2000	To Calgary Flames: Mike Vernon	To Minnesota Wild: Rights to Dan Cavanaugh; 8th-round pick in 2001	
June 24, 2000	To Calgary Flames: Miika Elomo; Buffalo’s 4th-round pick in 2000	To Washington Capitals: 2nd-round pick in 2000	
June 25, 2000	To Calgary Flames: 8th-round pick in 2001	To Buffalo Sabres: 8th-round pick in 2000	
September 26, 2000	To Calgary Flames: Rights to Jordan Leopold	To Anaheim Mighty Ducks: Andrei Nazarov; 2nd-round pick in 2001	
March 6, 2001	To Calgary Flames: 8th-round pick in 2001	To San Jose Sharks: Bill Lindsay	
March 13, 2001	To Calgary Flames: Craig Conroy; 7th-round pick in 2001	To St. Louis Blues: Cory Stillman	

=== Players acquired ===
Date	Player	Former team	Term	Via	Ref
July 17, 2000	Mike Martin	Michigan K-Wings (IHL)		Free agency	
July 26, 2000	Dave Lowry	San Jose Sharks	2-year	Free agency	
July 27, 2000	Dallas Eakins	Chicago Blackhawks		Free agency	
August 25, 2000	Martin Brochu	Washington Capitals		Free agency	
August 29, 2000	Niklas Andersson	New York Islanders		Free agency	
October 3, 2000	Dwayne Hay	Tampa Bay Lightning		Waivers	
November 10, 2000	Igor Kravchuk	Ottawa Senators		Waivers	
February 16, 2001	Ron Sutter	San Jose Sharks		Free agency	

=== Players lost ===
Date	Player	New team	Via (Note: In parentheses is the player's free agency group on July 1 if applicable.)	Ref
N/A	Andrei Trefilov	Dusseldorfer EG (DEL)	Free agency (II) (Note: Calgary retained Trefilov’s NHL rights through the 2004–05 season.)	
June 2000	Martin St. Louis	Tampa Bay Lightning (Note: St. Louis signed with Tampa Bay on July 31.)	Buyout	
June 23, 2000	Sergei Krivokrasov	Minnesota Wild	Expansion draft	
June 23, 2000	Filip Kuba	Minnesota Wild	Expansion draft	
August 25, 2000	Steve Dubinsky	Chicago Blackhawks	Free agency (UFA)	
August 31, 2000	Eric Charron	Minnesota Wild	Free agency (UFA)	
September 5, 2000	Stewart Malgunas	Colorado Avalanche	Free agency (UFA)	
September 6, 2000	Grant Fuhr		Retirement	
September 17, 2000	Darryl Shannon	Montreal Canadiens	Free agency (III)	
September 29, 2000	Andreas Johansson	New York Rangers	Waiver draft	
October 18, 2000	Lee Sorochan	London Knights (BISL)	Free agency (UFA)	
October 25, 2000	John Tripp	Pensacola Ice Pilots (ECHL)	Free agency (UFA)	
November 4, 2000	Bobby Dollas	San Jose Sharks	Free agency (III)	
December 7, 2000	Steve Smith		Retirement	
February 16, 2001	Wade Belak	Toronto Maple Leafs	Waivers	
April 11, 2001	Benoit Gratton	Montreal Canadiens	Waivers	

=== Signings ===
Date	Player	Term	Contract type	Ref
June 11, 2000	Martin St. Louis	1-year	Option exercised	
July 5, 2000	Brad Werenka		Re-signing	
July 17, 2000	Marty Murray		Re-signing	
July 27, 2000	Jeff Cowan		Re-signing	
July 28, 2000	Jeff Shantz		Re-signing	
July 31, 2000	Wade Belak		Re-signing	
August 3, 2000	Jason Botterill		Re-signing	
August 3, 2000	Miika Elomo		Re-signing	
August 3, 2000	Jason Wiemer		Re-signing	
August 4, 2000	Fred Brathwaite	2-year	Arbitration award	
August 24, 2000	Dave Roche		Re-signing	
August 28, 2000	Chris Clark		Re-signing	
August 28, 2000	Clarke Wilm		Re-signing	
August 30, 2000	Jason Wiemer		Extension	
September 11, 2000	Levente Szuper		Entry-level	
September 12, 2000	Darrel Scoville		Re-signing	
October 6, 2000	Micki DuPont		Entry-level	
October 9, 2000	Marc Savard	3-year	Re-signing	
November 29, 2000	Derek Morris		Re-signing	
January 27, 2001	Mike Vernon	1-year	Extension	
May 31, 2001	Jukka Hentunen		Entry-level	

== Draft picks ==
Calgary's picks at the 2000 NHL entry draft, held in Calgary. The Flames played to the home crowd, selecting Brent Krahn of the Calgary Hitmen with their first pick, 9th overall.

Rnd	Pick	Player	Nationality	Position	Team (league)	NHL statistics				
Rnd	Pick	Player	Nationality	Position	Team (league)	GP	G	A	Pts	PIM
1	9	Brent Krahn	Canada	G	Calgary Hitmen (WHL)	1	0–1–0, 9.00GAA			
2	40	Kurtis Foster	Canada	D	Peterborough Petes (OHL)	405	42	118	160	308
2	46	Jarret Stoll	Canada	C	Kootenay Ice (WHL)	872	144	244	388	618
4	116	Levente Szuper	Hungary	G	Ottawa 67's (OHL)					
5	141	Wade Davis	Canada	D	Calgary Hitmen (WHL)					
5	155	Travis Moen	Canada	LW	Kelowna Rockets (WHL)	747	59	77	136	801
6	176	Jukka Hentunen	Finland	F	HPK Hameenlinna (Fin Jr.)	38	4	5	9	4
8	239	David Hajek	Czech Republic	D	Chumutov (Cze Jr.)					
9	270	Micki Dupont	Canada	D	Kamloops Blazers (WHL)	23	1	3	4	12

== Farm teams ==
=== Saint John Flames ===
The 2000–01 AHL season was the eighth season for the Saint John Flames, all affiliated with the Flames. It was a record-setting year, as the Baby Flames ran away with the Canadian Division, finishing third overall in the league with a 44–24–7–5 record, good for 100 points. Saint John swept through the Portland Pirates, Quebec Citadelles and Providence Bruins by a combined 12–2 record. The Flames captured their only Calder Cup by defeating the Wilkes-Barre/Scranton Penguins 4 games to 2. Steve Begin won the Jack A. Butterfield Trophy as playoff MVP.

== See also ==
- 2000–01 NHL season
