= Dan Trebil =

American ice hockey player

- Born: April 10, 1974 (age 52) Bloomington, Minnesota, U.S.
- Height: 6 ft 3 in (191 cm)
- Weight: 215 lb (98 kg; 15 st 5 lb)
- Position: Defense
- Shot: Right
- Played for: Mighty Ducks of Anaheim; Pittsburgh Penguins; St. Louis Blues
- National team: United States
- NHL draft: 138th overall, 1992; New Jersey Devils
- Playing career: 1996–2002

Daniel Patrick Trebil (born April 10, 1974) is an American former professional ice hockey player who played in the NHL with the Mighty Ducks of Anaheim, Pittsburgh Penguins, and St. Louis Blues between 1996 and 2001. He played defense and shot right-handed.

Trebil was drafted out of high school by the New Jersey Devils in the 6th round, 138th overall in the 1992 NHL entry draft. After being drafted Trebil decided to go to college and played with the University of Minnesota for 4 years. He increased his point total each year while in college, scoring 46 points in 42 games his senior season (1995–1996) and being named to the WCHA second All-Star team and NCAA West second All-Star team.

After college Trebil signed with the Mighty Ducks of Anaheim. He played the majority of the 1996–1997 season with the Baltimore Bandits of the AHL while also making his NHL debut with the Mighty Ducks, appearing in 29 games and scoring 6 points. The next 2 seasons were much the same for Trebil. He played sparingly with the Mighty Ducks, spending most of the time with the Cincinnati Mighty Ducks.

For the 1999–2000 season Trebil played 52 games with the Cincinnati Mighty Ducks, scoring 28 points. Towards the end of the year he was traded to the Pittsburgh Penguins and appeared in 3 games with the Penguins. After signing with the New York Islanders for the 2000–2001 season Trebil was quickly traded back to the Penguins. Trebil played 16 games with the Penguins before being traded to the St. Louis Blues. Trebil split the remainder of the season with the Blues and the Worcester IceCats.

Trebil signed with Stockholm-based Hammarby IF in Allsvenskan, Sweden's second-tier hockey league, in 2001. He played briefly with the team, appearing in 18 games, before retiring from hockey.

== Career statistics ==
=== Regular season and playoffs ===
			Regular season					Playoffs
Season	Team	League	GP	G	A	Pts	PIM	GP	G	A	Pts	PIM
1991–92	Bloomington Jefferson High School	HS-MN	—	—	—	—	—	—	—	—	—	—
1992–93	University of Minnesota	WCHA	36	2	11	13	14	—	—	—	—	—
1993–94	University of Minnesota	WCHA	42	1	21	22	24	—	—	—	—	—
1994–95	University of Minnesota	WCHA	44	10	33	43	10	—	—	—	—	—
1995–96	University of Minnesota	WCHA	42	11	35	46	36	—	—	—	—	—
1996–97	Mighty Ducks of Anaheim	NHL	29	3	3	6	23	9	0	1	1	6
1996–97	Baltimore Bandits	AHL	49	4	20	24	38	—	—	—	—	—
1997–98	Mighty Ducks of Anaheim	NHL	21	0	1	1	2	—	—	—	—	—
1997–98	Cincinnati Mighty Ducks	AHL	32	5	15	20	21	—	—	—	—	—
1998–99	Mighty Ducks of Anaheim	NHL	6	0	0	0	0	1	0	0	0	2
1998–99	Cincinnati Mighty Ducks	AHL	52	6	15	21	31	—	—	—	—	—
1999–00	Cincinnati Mighty Ducks	AHL	52	7	21	28	48	—	—	—	—	—
1999–00	Pittsburgh Penguins	NHL	3	1	0	1	0	—	—	—	—	—
2000–01	Chicago Wolves	IHL	6	0	2	2	4	—	—	—	—	—
2000–01	Pittsburgh Penguins	NHL	16	0	0	0	7	—	—	—	—	—
2000–01	St. Louis Blues	NHL	10	0	0	0	0	—	—	—	—	—
2000–01	Worcester IceCats	AHL	14	2	7	9	0	9	0	5	5	2
2001–02	Hammarby IF	SWE-2	18	3	8	11	18	—	—	—	—	—
AHL totals			199	24	78	102	138	9	0	5	5	2
NHL totals			85	4	4	8	32	10	0	1	1	8

=== International ===
Year	Team	Event	GP	G	A	Pts	PIM
1998	United States	WC	5	1	3	4	4
Senior totals			4	0	0	0	0

== Awards and honors ==
Award	Year
All-WCHA Second Team	1995–96
AHCA West Second-Team All-American	1995–96

Awards and achievements
Preceded by Justin McHugh	WCHA Student-Athlete of the Year; 1995–96	Succeeded by Petri Gunther
