= Michel Goulet =

Canadian ice hockey player (born 1960)

- Hockey Hall of Fame, 1998
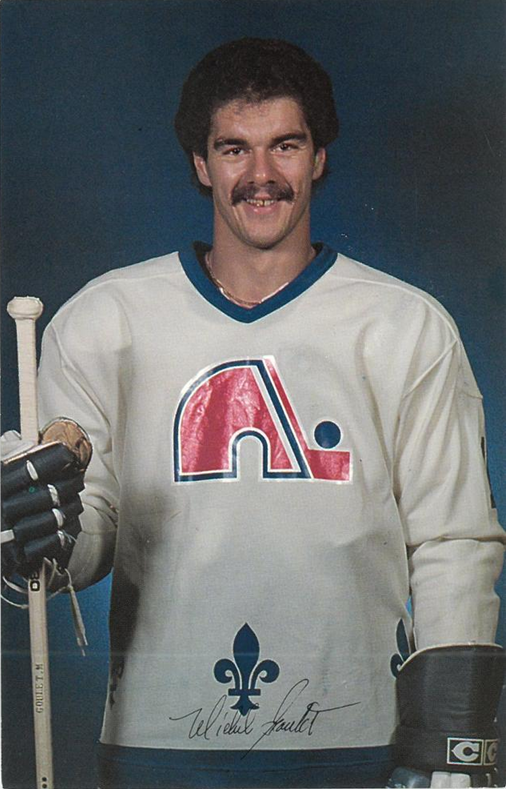
- Goulet with the Quebec Nordiques in 1980
- Born: April 21, 1960 (age 66) Péribonka, Quebec, Canada
- Height: 6 ft 1 in (185 cm)
- Weight: 195 lb (88 kg; 13 st 13 lb)
- Position: Left wing
- Shot: Left
- Played for: Birmingham Bulls; Quebec Nordiques; Chicago Blackhawks
- National team: Canada
- NHL draft: 20th overall, 1979; Quebec Nordiques
- Playing career: 1978–1994
Medal record
Representing Canada
Ice hockey
World Championships
Bronze medal – third place	1983 West Germany
Canada Cup
Gold medal – first place	1984 Canada
Gold medal – first place	1987 Canada

Michel Alain Goulet (French pronunciation: [miʃɛl alɛ̃ ɡulɛ]; goo-LAY; born April 21, 1960) is a Canadian former professional ice hockey forward who played 15 seasons in the National Hockey League (NHL) for the Quebec Nordiques and Chicago Blackhawks. He also played one season in the World Hockey Association (WHA) for the Birmingham Bulls. He was a two-time Canada Cup champion with Team Canada. Goulet collected 58 points as an 18-year-old rookie in the WHA before becoming eligible to be drafted in the 1979 NHL draft, which saw him picked by Quebec. Goulet had four consecutive seasons from 1982 to 1986 with 50 goals each, becoming the first Nordique to do so in the NHL; he had four 100-point seasons for the team while leading them to the Conference Finals twice (1982, 1985). After the team started declining in 1987, Goulet was traded to the Blackhawks in 1990. He achieved his 1,000th point in 1991 and the following year saw him score his 500th career goal and reach the Stanley Cup Final for the only time in his playing career. Goulet sustained a severe concussion on a collision in 1994 that ultimately forced him to retire in early 1995. He was inducted into the Hockey Hall of Fame in 1998.

He subsequently worked for the Colorado Avalanche in their front office, and his name was engraved on the Cup when the team won it in 1996 and 2001; he was let go from the Avalanche in 2009 and soon became a scout that saw him serve for three different teams from 2009 to 2020.

== Early life ==
Goulet excelled in midget and minor league hockey in the 1970s in Quebec, which saw him play with the Quebec Remparts of the QMJHL from 1976 to 1978. As a midget player, Goulet was reportedly so amped to play hockey that he stole the key to the local arena in Mistassini in order to let himself skate for an hour at 5:00 in the morning, doing so roughly three times a week for over a year without getting caught.

== Playing career ==
=== WHA ===
Goulet played his first professional season with the Birmingham Bulls of the WHA during the 1978–79 season. Goulet was one of just four 18-year olds to play in the WHA that year alongside Wayne Gretzky, Mark Messier, and Jari Kurri, all of whom who ended up as members of the Hockey Hall of Fame. He scored 28 goals and 58 points. Following the NHL-WHA merger, Goulet was declared eligible for the 1979 entry draft and wanted to play for the Quebec Nordiques. Due to the circumstances of the WHA merger in regard to compensation, the Nordiques were required to give compensation for keeping Réal Cloutier (as they used their "priority selections" already) from going to the Chicago Black Hawks, who had drafted him in 1976. The Nordiques held the 19th pick in the 1979 draft and elected to keep the pick (Bob Pulford was later quoted as saying that chief scout Michel Dumas was ready to select Goulet) and instead traded Chicago their first-round pick in the 1980 draft. As such, Goulet was drafted by the Nordiques (as for Chicago, they used their 1980 draft pick on Denis Savard).

Reportedly, he was the first player to request a contract in French. Pierre Lacroix served as Goulet's agent during his time in Quebec. Goulet ended up as the last Bull to have played in the NHL.

=== NHL ===
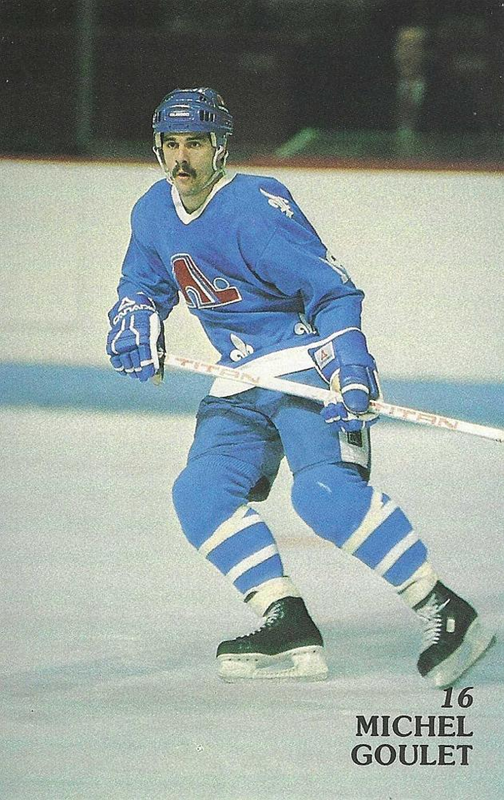
Goulet with the Quebec Nordiques in 1986

In the 1979–80 season, Goulet played in 77 games for the Nordiques. He collected his first NHL point with an assist in a 2–2 tie versus the Hartford Whalers on October 24 before scoring his first goal on November 10 on the road against the New York Rangers before collecting his first game-winning goal eight days later versus Toronto. He had 22 goals and 32 assists for 54 points with 48 penalty minutes. Goulet reflected on his first-year struggles on not being able to score consistently on breakaway shots, stating that teammate Marc Tardif gave him advice to work on his technique, specifically, "Put 60 to 100 pucks between the blueline and red line and go down the wing and shoot.” And the other thing he said was, “Put the puck on the side so you can deke or shoot right away." Gradually, by working hard with the advice given, Goulet improved. The following season had him play 76 games and record 32 goals with 39 assists with 45 penalty minutes. Goulet had his first significant point streak come in the season, as he recorded a point in thirteen straight games played from November 24 to December 21 (which saw him score eight goals and record eight assists). The Nordiques reached the Stanley Cup playoffs that year for the first time in franchise history. Facing the Philadelphia Flyers in the Preliminary Round, Goulet had a three-point night in his playoff debut with a goal and two assists. He had further goals in game three and game five and recorded seven total points but Quebec lost in five games. Goulet played in all 80 games of the 1981–82 season and improved further with 42 goals and 42 assists each, which also saw him lead the league in short-handed goals with six. In the playoffs, Goulet had six of his eight goals in the Division finals as Quebec beat Boston to reach their first ever Conference Finals, but they were swept in four games by the New York Islanders; Goulet had thirteen points in 16 total games.

Goulet's fourth season with Quebec saw him record his first 50-goal season with a career-high 57 while adding 48 assists for 105 total points as he was named to the All-Star Game for the first of four straight seasons. His 57 goals that season still remains a franchise record. (Note: The franchise record is denoted as being for the NHL era, as the team previously played in the World Hockey Association (WHA) from 1972 to 1979. In that high-scoring era, Réal Cloutier set the WHA/NHL franchise record for good in the final WHA season of 1978–79 with 75 goals to top Marc Tardif, who had scored 71 in the 1975–76 season.) Goulet was one of the NHL's most prolific scorers during the 1980s. He became one of the centrepieces of the Nordiques along with the Šťastný brothers (Peter, Anton, Marián). Goulet had his peak in total points with 122 in the 1983–84 season on the strength of 56 goals and a career-high 66 assists. He also had his longest streak of games with a goal with one in nine consecutive games from December 14 to January 5. In the Stanley Cup playoffs that year, the Nordiques lost in the second round to the Montreal Canadiens, with the decisive game six going down in lore as the "Good Friday Massacre" between the Quebec and Montreal players; Goulet scored the second goal of the game but took three penalties as the Nordiques lost 5–3. In September 1984, Goulet played for Canada in the Canada Cup and had five goals with six assists as Canada beat Sweden in the championship. Goulet played in 69 games in 1984 but managed another 50-goal season with 55. In the Stanley Cup playoffs, Goulet had eleven goals in the first two rounds of the playoffs as Quebec marched to the Conference Finals against the Flyers, but Goulet was held in check to no goals as Philadelphia won in six games. Goulet recorded 53 goals in 75 games of the 1985–86 season that saw him record his only two four-goal games, doing so on December 14 against the New Jersey Devils and on March 17 against the Canadiens. The 1986–87 season saw Goulet narrowly miss out on a 50-goal season with 49 in 75 games played. Goulet was part of another victorious Canada Cup team in the fall of 1987 as Canada defeated the Soviet Union. He had his last 100-point campaign in the 1987–88 season on 48 goals and 58 assists in the first of three straight years that Quebec missed the playoffs, and Goulet regressed to 26 goals and 64 total points the following year.

From the start of the 1980–81 season until the end of the 1989–90 season, Goulet had 438 goals, third most among all players in that same span. He was the only Nordique to record four consecutive 50-goal seasons in their NHL history and no Avalanche player has had more than two 50-goal seasons since Goulet. During that 1989–90 season, the Nordiques went into a tailspin, going 12–42–7 that saw Goulet score 16 goals with 29 assists in 57 games. On March 5, 1990, he was traded alongside goalie Greg Millen and a sixth round pick at 1991 NHL entry draft to the Chicago Blackhawks for Everett Sanipass, Dan Vincelette and Mario Doyon. On February 23, 1991, Goulet, playing in his 878th game, recorded his 1,000th career point on a goal scored on the Minnesota North Stars at the Met Center in a 3-3 tie. In July 1991, Goulet was offered a four-year deal for $2.9 million by the St. Louis Blues, but the Blackhawks matched the offer sheet to keep him in Chicago.

In the 1991–92 season (his second full year with the team), he had 22 goals and 41 assists. On February 16, 1992, Goulet became the 17th player to reach 500 career goals, doing so against goaltender Jeff Reese of the Calgary Flames at Chicago Stadium in a 5-5 tie. A sore groin in March ended up seeing him suffer a strained groin muscle in the March 31 game that resulted in him missing all of the first round of the 1992 Stanley Cup playoffs before finally returning in the final game of the second round. In the Conference Finals against the Edmonton Oilers, Goulet had a goal in each of the first two games (which included the game-winning goal in game two) and recorded two assists in game three (which included the game-winner in overtime) as the Blackhawks won in a sweep to reach the Stanley Cup Final. Facing the defending champion Pittsburgh Penguins, Goulet scored his only goal of the series in game one to give Chicago an early 2-0 lead, but the team was ultimately swept in four games, with Goulet not even recording a shot on goal in game two and the decisive game four. Goulet had his 14th consecutive 20-goal season in the 1992–93 campaign with 23 goals; he was the seventh player with fourteen consecutive 20-goal seasons in NHL history.

The 1993–94 season saw him score 16 goals in 56 games played; Goulet scored what ended up as his final goal on March 13, 1994 where he logged a goal and two assists in a 5–2 victory over the Vancouver Canucks at home in Chicago Stadium. He suffered a career-ending injury three days later March 16 during a game at the Montreal Forum versus the Canadiens. He noted what he remembered from the accident in a 2022 interview:

I lost an edge going down the wing. Roenick was going to the net and Larmer was coming late, and all of a sudden, my left skate goes across my body and the boards are right there. I land right in the bottom of the boards. Everything on the right side of my brain, totally gone. Never played after that. From there, it was a big battle. Totally lost all my co-ordination, my strength. I couldn’t even lift 30 pounds.

Goulet spent days in a Montreal hospital. In the time he spent in Montreal with a coma, Goulet mentioned in 2022 that he did not remember any of it (he also noted his gratefulness to Canadiens doctor David S. Mulder for his care during that time). During the fall of 1994 in the lockout, Goulet tried to start skating with his teammates in an attempt to return to play but found himself unable to skate, and it took two years of therapy to be able to walk. At the age of 34, Goulet announced his retirement from the NHL on January 26, 1995, as a result of the incident.

In 1,089 NHL games, he recorded 548 goals and 604 assists for 1,152 points. Goulet recorded a 20-goal season in his first fourteen seasons as a player, and when his career ended in 1994, he was one of just thirteen players with 14 20-goal seasons in NHL history. Goulet had four 50-goal seasons in his career, a mark achieved by only fourteen other players in NHL history as of 2026.

== Post-retirement ==
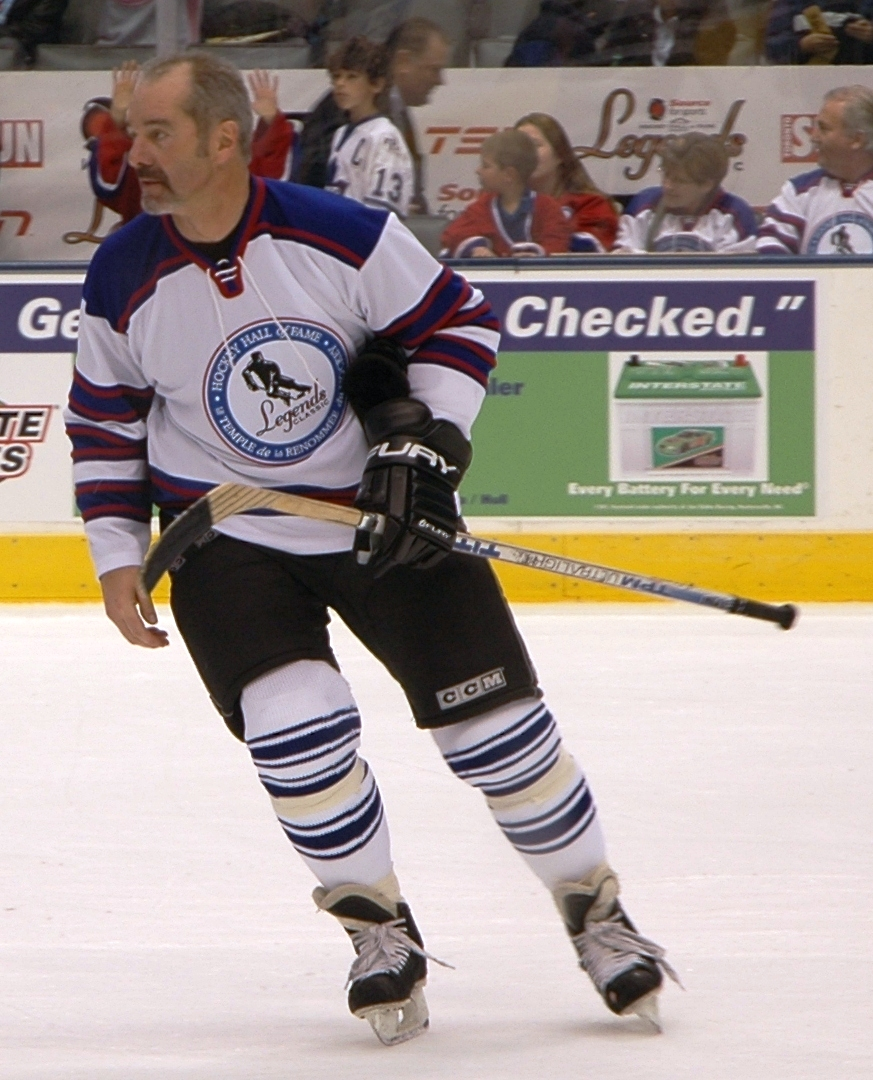
Goulet in 2008

In February 1995, the Nordiques announcced they would retire Goulet's number 16 in a ceremony on March 16, 1995, exactly one year after Goulet's career-ending injury, doing so before a large crowd at le Colisée de Québec, where he enjoyed his most productive years. This turned out to be the final season of the Nordiques, which relocated to Denver to become the Colorado Avalanche for the 1995–96 season.

When the team relocated to Denver, Colorado, Goulet was approached by Lacroix (now GM of the Avalanche) about serving as director of player personnel for the newly christened Colorado Avalanche, which he accepted. In the first season as the Avalanche in 1995–96, the team went all the way to the Stanley Cup Final, winning in four games over the Florida Panthers, ensuring that Goulet's name would be engraved on the Stanley Cup. The Avalanche won the cup again in the 2000–01 NHL season. Goulet served various positions in the organization such as being a director of player development and in the 2005-06 season served as special assistant to the president. Goulet was in the running to succeed Lacroix as general manager in the summer of 2006 after Lacroix announced he would focus only on his duties as team president, but Goulet ultimately was not selected as GM. On June 3, 2009, newly-named GM Greg Sherman elected to fire Goulet and five others. He served as a scout for the Flames for a number of years before serving as a scout for the Anaheim Ducks and Pittsburgh Penguins until 2020. Goulet was in the Pepsi Center when Boston Bruins center Marc Savard suffered his second concussion in less than a year on January 22, 2011, and reflected on the perils of concussions and the feelings about the possible end of one's career (as it turned out, Savard never played again):

When I came back and tried to even skate, I could tell my coordination was totally off and I was like, ‘Wow, what is this about?' I mean, I skate and play my whole life and all of a sudden I can’t do it right anymore? It’s a horrible feeling. Now, that being said, my final concussion was a lot more serious, to the point where I literally was told your next step was almost a wheelchair. But you look at that [Matt] Cooke hit on Marc and, yeah, that was really serious, too. I had the hardest concussion you can have, but I can relate to Marc.

I mean, when I started to try playing again, I knew right away, and it’s gotta be tough for him right now because that’s what he is asking himself, I bet. Even if he tries again, I think, yeah, he can do it for a while, but it will catch up to him. I really feel for him and anyone who has to go through this. It’s sad, and it was hard to see that last Saturday.

Even in pick-up games now, I’ll be a bit winded and feel it a bit. It stays with you for life. But you have to ask yourself, 'Do I at least want as close to normal a life as I can get?'

It’s about Marc and his well-being now. Forget the game for a minute and think about life. It’s hard, but you have to really ask yourself that. I’m sure he will try and come back because this is our job, our passion. But at one point, you look past that, and that’s what I had to do.

But like I said, everyone is different, too, and maybe he can keep playing. You look at [Patrice] Bergeron, and I talked to him when it happened to him [in 2007] and I said, 'Go back when you’re 100 percent and no less, but if you can’t be 100 percent, then you need to think about life.' And that’s how it is.

As of 2022, Goulet covered the Avalanche and their AHL affiliate in Colorado Springs for Team 33, an independent scouting service.

== Honours ==
Award	Year
NHL
All-Star Game	1983, 1984, 1985, 1986, 1988
NHL First All-Star Team	1983–84, 1985–86, 1986–87
NHL Second All-Star Team	1982–83, 1987–88
Hockey Hall of Fame	1998

He was inducted into the Hockey Hall of Fame in 1998 alongside former linemate Peter Šťastný in a ceremony held on November 16, 1998. They were the first Hall of Famers to earn their credentials primarily with the Nordiques, prior to the franchise relocating to become the Colorado Avalanche.

In 2012, he was inducted into the World Hockey Association Hall of Fame in the “Legends of the Game” category.

== Career statistics ==
=== Regular season and playoffs ===
			Regular season					Playoffs
Season	Team	League	GP	G	A	Pts	PIM	GP	G	A	Pts	PIM
1976–77	Québec Remparts	QMJHL	37	17	18	35	9	14	3	8	11	19
1977–78	Québec Remparts	QMJHL	72	73	62	135	109	1	0	1	1	0
1978–79	Birmingham Bulls	WHA	78	28	30	58	65	—	—	—	—	—
1979–80	Quebec Nordiques	NHL	77	22	32	54	48	—	—	—	—	—
1980–81	Quebec Nordiques	NHL	76	32	39	71	45	4	3	4	7	7
1981–82	Quebec Nordiques	NHL	80	42	42	84	48	16	8	5	13	6
1982–83	Quebec Nordiques	NHL	80	57	48	105	51	4	0	0	0	6
1983–84	Quebec Nordiques	NHL	75	56	66	122	76	9	2	4	6	17
1984–85	Quebec Nordiques	NHL	69	55	40	95	55	17	10	11	21	17
1985–86	Quebec Nordiques	NHL	75	53	51	104	64	3	1	2	3	10
1986–87	Quebec Nordiques	NHL	75	49	47	96	61	13	9	5	14	35
1987–88	Quebec Nordiques	NHL	80	48	58	106	56	—	—	—	—	—
1988–89	Quebec Nordiques	NHL	69	26	38	64	67	—	—	—	—	—
1989–90	Quebec Nordiques	NHL	57	16	29	45	42	—	—	—	—	—
1989–90	Chicago Blackhawks	NHL	8	4	1	5	9	14	2	4	6	6
1990–91	Chicago Blackhawks	NHL	74	27	38	65	65	—	—	—	—	—
1991–92	Chicago Blackhawks	NHL	75	22	41	63	69	9	3	4	7	6
1992–93	Chicago Blackhawks	NHL	63	23	21	44	43	3	0	1	1	0
1993–94	Chicago Blackhawks	NHL	56	16	14	30	26	—	—	—	—	—
NHL totals			1,089	548	605	1,153	825	92	39	39	78	110

=== International ===
Year	Team	Event	GP	G	A	Pts	PIM
1983	Canada	WC	10	1	8	9	6
1984	Canada	CC	8	5	6	11	0
1987	Canada	CC	8	2	3	5	0
Senior totals			26	8	17	25	6

== See also ==
- List of NHL statistical leaders
- List of NHL players with 1,000 points
- List of NHL players with 500 goals

== Notes ==
Awards and achievements
Preceded by Lucien DeBlois	Quebec Nordiques first-round draft pick 1980	Succeeded by Randy Moller
