= Lacroix (surname) =

Lacroix or La Croix is a French topographic surname meaning "the cross". It often referred to a person living near a market or roadside cross, or carrying a cross in a religious pageant. Related names include Cross, LaCrosse, and Delacroix.

Notable people and fictional characters with the name include:

== People ==
- Adon Lacroix, (1887–1975) Belgian Artist, Poet, and Muse, First Wife of the Artist Man Ray
- Alphonse Lacroix, (ice hockey) silver medalist, 1924 Olympics
- André Lacroix (businessman) (born 1960)
- André Lacroix (ice hockey) (born 1945)
- André Lacroix (tennis) (1908–1992)
- Anne-Marie Lacroix (1732–1802), French writer
- Antoine Lacroix (1756–1806), French composer and violinist
- Antoine François Alfred Lacroix (1863–1948), mineralogist and geologist
- Caroline Lacroix (1883–1948), royal mistress
- Charles de la Croix (1792–1869), missionary
- Christian Lacroix (born 1951), fashion
- Gérald Lacroix (born 1957), cardinal and archbishop of Quebec
- Joe Betts-LaCroix (born 1962), computer industry
- Léo Lacroix (footballer) (born 1992)
- Lisa LaCroix, actress
- Luc M. Lacroix
- Marc Lacroix (disambiguation), multiple people
- Maxence Lacroix, French association football player
- Pat LaCroix (born 1938), musician and photographer
- Paul Lacroix (1806–1884), author and journalist
- Pierre Lacroix (disambiguation), multiple people
- Remy LaCroix (born 1988), pornographic actress
- Robert Lacroix (born 1940), professor of economics
- Sébastien Lacroix (born 1983), Nordic Olympian skier
- Sylvestre François Lacroix (1765–1843), French mathematician
- Thibault Lacroix (born 1985), rugby union player
- Thierry Lacroix (born 1967), rugby union player
- Vincent Lacroix, former Quebec businessman, head of the Norbourg scandal

== Fictional characters ==
- Lucien LaCroix, character on Forever Knight.
- Sebastian LaCroix, from Vampire: The Masquerade – Bloodlines.
- Sebastian ‘Bash’ Lacroix, from Anne with an E.
- Eno LaCroix, a character from the webcomic Monsterkind.
- Amelie Lacroix, a French sniper in the organization Talon from the Blizzard game Overwatch.
