= St. Croix (disambiguation) =

Saint Croix is an island of the United States Virgin Islands.

St. Croix or Saint Croix may also refer to:

== Places ==
- St. Croix, New Brunswick, Canada, in York County
- Saint Croix Parish, New Brunswick, Canada, in Charlotte County
  - Saint Croix (electoral district)
- St. Croix, Indiana, U.S.
- St. Croix County, Wisconsin, U.S.
- St. Croix Island (Algoa Bay), South Africa
- Saint Croix Island, Maine, U.S.
- St. Croix River (disambiguation), the name of several rivers

== People ==
- Rick St. Croix (born 1955), Canadian ice hockey goaltender
- Stephen St. Croix (1948–2006), American artist
- Steven St. Croix (born 1968), pornographic actor

== Other uses ==
- St. Croix (clothing), a clothing store in Minnesota, U.S.
- St. Croix (grape), a hybrid grape variety
- St. Croix sheep, a breed of domestic sheep
- USS Saint Croix, an attack transport vessel

== See also ==
- Sainte-Croix (disambiguation)
- Croix (disambiguation)
