= La Croix =

La Croix primarily refers to:

- La Croix (newspaper), a French Catholic daily newspaper
- La Croix Sparkling Water, an American beverage distributed by the National Beverage Corporation

La Croix or Lacroix may also refer to:

== Places ==
- Lacroix-Barrez, a municipality in the Aveyron department
- Lacroix-Falgarde, a municipality in the Haute-Garonne department
- Lacroix-Saint-Ouen, a municipality in the Oise department
- Lacroix-sur-Meuse, a municipality in the Meuse department
- La Croix-aux-Bois, in the Ardennes department
- La Croix-aux-Mines, in the Vosges department
- La Croix-Avranchin, in the Manche department
- La Croix-Blanche, in the Lot-et-Garonne department
- La Croix-Comtesse, in the Charente-Maritime department
- La Croix-de-la-Rochette, in the Savoie department
- La Croix-du-Perche, in the Eure-et-Loir department
- La Croix-en-Brie, in the Seine-et-Marne department
- La Croix-en-Champagne, in the Marne department
- La Croix-en-Touraine, in the Indre-et-Loire department
- La Croix-Helléan, in the Morbihan department
- La Croix-Saint-Leufroy, in the Eure department
- La Croix-sur-Gartempe, in the Haute-Vienne department
- La Croix-sur-Ourcq, in the Aisne department
- La Croix-sur-Roudoule, in the Alpes-Maritimes department
- La Croix-Valmer, in the Var department
- Parc de Lacroix-Laval, a park in the Metropolis of Lyon

== Other uses ==
- Lacroix (crater), located in the southwest part of the Moon
- Lacroix (surname), including a list of people and fictional characters with the name
- Maurice Lacroix, a brand of Swiss watches

== See also ==
- Croix (disambiguation)
- Lac à la Croix (disambiguation)
