= Saint Croix Island =

Saint Croix Island may refer to:

- Saint Croix Island, Maine, U.S.
- St. Croix Island (Algoa Bay), South Africa
- Saint Croix, U.S. Virgin Islands

== See also ==
- St. Croix (disambiguation)
