= La Crosse (disambiguation) =

La Crosse is a city in the U.S. state of Wisconsin and the county seat of La Crosse County.

La Crosse may also refer to:

== Inhabited places in the United States ==
- La Crosse, Georgia, an unincorporated community in Schley County, Georgia
- La Crosse, Illinois, an unincorporated community in Hancock County, Illinois
- La Crosse, Indiana, a town in LaPorte County, Indiana
- La Crosse, Kansas, a city in and the county seat of Rush County, Kansas
- La Crosse, Missouri, an unincorporated community in Macon County, Missouri
- La Crosse, Virginia, a town in Mecklenburg County, Virginia
- La Crosse, Washington, a rural small town in Whitman County, Washington
- La Crosse County, Wisconsin, a county located in the state of Wisconsin
- La Crosse Metropolitan Area, encompassing La Crosse County, Wisconsin and Houston County, Minnesota
- La Crosse Township, Jackson County, Minnesota, a township in Jackson County, Minnesota

== Other ==
- La Crosse (grape), a hybrid cultivar of wine grape
- La Crosse encephalitis, encephalitis caused by an arbovirus
- La Crosse River, a tributary of the Mississippi
- La Crosse station, an Amtrak intercity train station in La Crosse, Wisconsin
- La Crosse Technology, a manufacturer of electronic products
- Roman Catholic Diocese of La Crosse, a Roman Catholic diocese of the Catholic Church encompassing the city of La Crosse and 19 counties

== See also ==
- Crosse, a surname
- Île-à-la-Crosse (disambiguation)
- Lacrosse (disambiguation)
