= List of Quebec Nordiques/Colorado Avalanche general managers =

The Colorado Avalanche are a professional ice hockey team based in Denver, Colorado, United States. They are members of the Central Division of the Western Conference of the National Hockey League (NHL). The Avalanche arrived in Denver in 1995 after playing since 1972 as the Quebec Nordiques. Since the franchise began in 1972, the team has had nine general managers.

== Key ==
Key of terms and definitions
Term	Definition
No.	Number of general managers^{[a]}
Ref(s)	References
–	Does not apply
†	Elected to the Hockey Hall of Fame in the Builder category

== General managers ==
General managers of the Colorado Avalanche franchise
No.	Name	Tenure	Accomplishments during this term	Ref(s)
1	Jacques Plante	May 2, 1973 – May 4, 1974		
2	Maurice Filion	May 7, 1974 – April 19, 1988	Won Avco World Trophy (1977); 1 division title and 7 playoff appearances	
3	Martin Madden	June 27, 1988 – February 2, 1990	No playoff appearances	
–	Maurice Filion (Interim)	February 2, 1990 – May 5, 1990	No playoff appearances	
4	Pierre Pagé	May 5, 1990 – May 24, 1994	1 playoff appearance	
5	Pierre Lacroix†	May 24, 1994 – May 24, 2006	Won Stanley Cup 2 times (1996, 2001); Won Presidents' Trophy 2 times (1996–97, 2000–01); 2 conference titles, 9 division titles, and 11 playoff appearances	
6	François Giguère	May 24, 2006 – April 13, 2009	1 playoff appearance	
7	Greg Sherman	June 3, 2009 – September 19, 2014	1 division title and 2 playoff appearances	
8	Joe Sakic	September 19, 2014 – July 11, 2022	Won Stanley Cup 1 time (2022); Won Presidents' Trophy 1 time (2020–21); 1 conference title, 2 division titles, and 5 playoff appearances	
9	Chris MacFarland	July 11, 2022 – June 2, 2026	Won Presidents' Trophy 1 time (2025–26); 2 division titles and 4 playoff appearances	
–	Joe Sakic	June 2, 2026 – present		

== See also ==
- List of current NHL general managers

== Notes ==
- ^{a} A running total of the number of general managers of the franchise. Thus any general manager who has two or more separate terms as general manager is only counted once.
