= Lac à la Croix =

Lac à la Croix or Lac-à-la-Croix (French for "Lake of the Cross") can refer to the following places in Quebec, Canada:

- Lac-à-la-Croix, Quebec, an unorganized territory
- Lac à la Croix (Lac-Édouard), a lake in the Mauricie region
- Lac-à-la-Croix, a community in the city of Métabetchouan–Lac-à-la-Croix

== See also ==
- Lac La Croix First Nation, a First Nation in Ontario, Canada
- Croix (disambiguation)
- La Croix (disambiguation)
- Cross Lake (disambiguation)
