= Pierre Lacroix =

Pierre Lacroix may refer to:

- Pierre Lacroix (theologian), French 18th century theologian
- Pierre Lacroix (rugby union) (1935–2019), French rugby union player
- Pierre Lacroix (ice hockey, born 1948), former NHL General Manager and team president
- Pierre Lacroix (ice hockey, born 1959), retired Canadian ice hockey player
