= François Giguère =

Canadian ice hockey executive

- Born: June 24, 1963 (age 61); Sainte-Foy, Quebec, Canada
- Occupation: former general manager of the Colorado Avalanche

François C.H. Giguère (born June 24, 1963) is a Canadian professional ice hockey executive who served as the general manager and executive vice president of the Colorado Avalanche. He was promoted on May 24, 2006. He previously worked for the Dallas Stars as assistant general manager and, previous to that, he worked in the Avalanche organization as vice president of hockey operations for the 2001 season and as assistant general manager between 1995 and 2000. He also worked in the Quebec Nordiques organization between 1990 and 1995. He has won two Stanley Cups in his career with Colorado, 1996 and 2001. He was released from the Colorado Avalanche on Monday April 13, 2009.

Preceded by Pierre Lacroix	General Manager of the Colorado Avalanche; 2006–09	Succeeded by Greg Sherman
