= Lacrosse (disambiguation) =

Lacrosse is a team sport.

Lacrosse or LaCrosse may also refer to:

== Places in the United States ==
- LaCrosse, Arkansas
- LaCrosse, Florida
- La Crosse, Kansas
- La Crosse, Wisconsin
- LaCrosse, Washington

== People ==
- Benji LaCrosse (born 1977), American race car driver
- Dave LaCrosse (born 1955), American football player
- Jean-Baptiste Raymond de Lacrosse (1761–1829), French admiral during the French Revolutionary and Napoleonic Wars

== Other ==
- Lacrosse, indie-pop band from Stockholm, Sweden
- Lacrosse (album), an album by John Zorn
- Lacrosse (satellite), a National Reconnaissance Office satellite
- Buick LaCrosse, an automobile produced by General Motors
- MGM-18 Lacrosse, a US Army missile used 1959–1964
- LaCrosse Footwear, a shoe company based in Oregon, USA

== See also ==
- Lacrosse Hall of Fame (disambiguation)
- LCROSS (Lunar Crater Observation and Sensing Satellite)
- La Crosse (disambiguation)
