= Cross Lake =

Cross Lake may refer to:

== Lakes ==
Canada

- Cross Lake (Manitoba), a lake along the Nelson River in Manitoba
- Ontario
  - Cross Lake (Temagami), in the municipality of Temagami, Nipissing District
  - Cross Lake (Moore Creek), in the municipality of South Algonquin, Nipissing District
- Lake of the cross (Lac-Édouard), in Upper-Batiscanie, Québec
- Lac Île-à-la-Crosse, in Saskatchewan

United States

- Cross Lake (Shreveport, Louisiana)
- Cross Lake (Maine)
- Cross Lake, Wabasha County, Minnesota
- Cross Lake (New York)

== Settlements ==
- Cross Lake, Manitoba, Canada
- Cross Lake, Ontario, Canada
- Crosslake, Minnesota, United States
- Île-à-la-Crosse, in Saskatchewan

== See also ==
- Cross Lake Provincial Park, Alberta, Canada
- Cross Lake First Nation
- Lac à la Croix (disambiguation)
