= Croix =

Croix (French for "cross") may refer to:

== Belgium ==
- Croix-lez-Rouveroy, a village in municipality of Estinnes in the province of Hainaut

== France ==
- Croix, Nord, in the Nord department
- Croix, Territoire de Belfort, in the Territoire de Belfort department
- Croix-Caluyau, in the Nord department
- Croix-Chapeau, in the Charente-Maritime department
- Croix-en-Ternois, in the Pas-de-Calais department
- Croix-Fonsomme, in the Aisne department
- Croix-Mare, in the Seine-Maritime department
- Croix-Moligneaux, in the Somme department
- Canton of Croix, administrative division of the Nord department, northern France

== People ==
- Croix Bethune (born 2001), American soccer player

== See also ==
- Croix Scaille, a hill plateau in the Ardennes, Belgium
- La Croix (disambiguation), including places called "La Croix"
- St. Croix (disambiguation)
- Lac à la Croix (disambiguation)
