= Greg Sherman =

American ice hockey executive

- Born: March 30, 1970 (age 56); Scranton, Pennsylvania, U.S.
- Occupation: former general manager of the Colorado Avalanche

Greg Sherman (born March 30, 1970) is an American ice hockey executive who served as the general manager of the Colorado Avalanche of the National Hockey League, a post he had held from June 3, 2009, to September 19, 2014. Sherman stepped into the role following seven years as a special assistant to general manager François Giguère and was later replaced by Joe Sakic.

When Patrick Roy was named head coach of the Avalanche in 2013, he was also named vice president of hockey operations. According to Bob McKenzie of TSN, Sherman was now general manager "in name only." During the 2013–14 season, Roy and executive vice president of hockey operations Sakic split the duties of general manager, though Sakic had the final say in hockey matters. Sherman was largely reduced to an advisory role under Roy and Sakic.

This de facto arrangement was formalized before the 2014–15 season, when Sakic was named general manager and Sherman was demoted to his assistant. Sherman also serves as head of scouting for the Colorado Avalanche.

Greg Sherman is now President and CEO of Thunder Road Inc. Thunder Road Inc. is the parent company of several entities located in the Greater Denver Metro Area of Colorado.

Preceded by François Giguère	General Manager of the Colorado Avalanche; 2009–14	Succeeded by Joe Sakic
