= Marc Lacroix =

Marc Lacroix may refer to:

- Marc Lacroix (biochemist) (born 1963), Belgian biochemist
- Marc Lacroix (photographer) (1927–2007), French photographer
- Marc Lacroix (entomologist), French entomologist
