= Colorado Avalanche =

National Hockey League team in Denver, Colorado

- 2026–27 Colorado Avalanche season
- Conference: Western
- Division: Central
- Founded: 1972
- History: Quebec Nordiques; 1972–1979 (WHA); 1979–1995 (NHL); Colorado Avalanche; 1995–present
- Home arena: Ball Arena
- City: Denver, Colorado
- Team colors: Burgundy, blue, silver, black
- Media: Altitude Sports and Entertainment; Altitude 950; Altitude Sports 92.5
- Owner: Kroenke Sports & Entertainment
- General manager: Joe Sakic
- Head coach: Jared Bednar
- Captain: Gabriel Landeskog
- Minor league affiliates: Colorado Eagles (AHL); New Mexico Goatheads (ECHL)
- Stanley Cups: 3 (1995–96, 2000–01, 2021–22)
- Conference championships: 3 (1995–96, 2000–01, 2021–22)
- Presidents' Trophies: 4 (1996–97, 2000–01, 2020–21, 2025–26)
- Division championships: 13 (1995–96, 1996–97, 1997–98, 1998–99, 1999–00, 2000–01, 2001–02, 2002–03, 2013–14, 2020–21, 2021–22, 2022–23, 2025–26)
- Official website: nhl.com/avalanche

The Colorado Avalanche (colloquially known as the Avs) are a professional ice hockey team based in Denver. The Avalanche compete in the National Hockey League (NHL) as a member of the Central Division in the Western Conference. The team plays its home games at Ball Arena, which it shares with the National Basketball Association's (NBA) Denver Nuggets and Colorado Mammoth of the National Lacrosse League (NLL).

Founded in 1972 as the Quebec Nordiques, the team was one of the charter franchises of the World Hockey Association (WHA). The franchise joined the NHL in 1979 as a result of the NHL–WHA merger. Following the 1994–95 season, they were sold to the COMSAT Entertainment Group and moved to Denver.

During their first season in Denver, the Avalanche won the Pacific Division and went on to sweep the Florida Panthers in the 1996 Stanley Cup Final. The 1996 Avalanche became the first Denver-based team in the four major North American professional sports leagues to win a league championship. They were also the second major North American sports team to win a championship a year after moving, joining the National Football League (NFL)'s 1937 Washington Redskins. In the 2001 Stanley Cup Final, the Avalanche defeated the New Jersey Devils in seven games to win their second championship. In the 2022 Stanley Cup Final, the Avalanche defeated the Tampa Bay Lightning in six games to win their third championship. As a result, they remain the only active NHL team that has won all of its appearances in the Stanley Cup Final.

The Avalanche have won thirteen division titles since moving to Denver (and set the league record for most consecutive division titles at nine in a row from 1995 to 2003; one in Quebec, the rest in Colorado), and qualified for the playoffs in each of their first ten seasons after the move; this streak ended in 2007.

== History ==
=== Quebec Nordiques (1972–1995) ===
The Quebec Nordiques were one of the World Hockey Association's (WHA) original teams when the league began play in 1972. Though first awarded to a group in San Francisco, the team was subsequently sold and moved to Quebec City prior to the start of the league's opening. During their seven WHA seasons, the Nordiques won the Avco World Trophy once, in 1977, and lost the finals once, in 1975. In 1979, the franchise entered the NHL, along with the WHA's Edmonton Oilers, Hartford Whalers, and Winnipeg Jets.

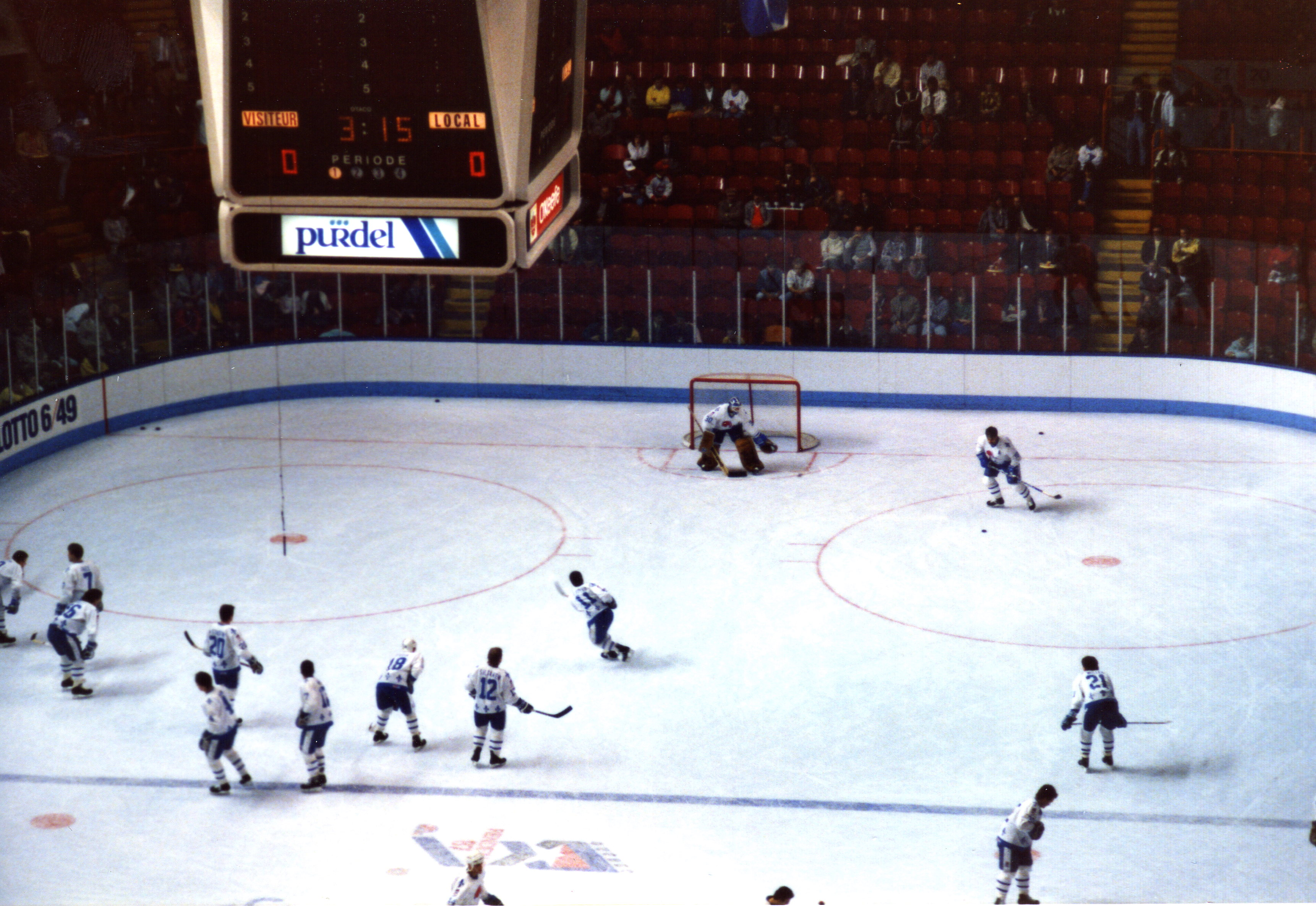
Quebec Nordiques warm up for a game in the 1986–87 season. The Avalanche played as the Nordiques from 1972 to 1995.

After making the postseason for seven consecutive years, from 1981 to 1987, the Nordiques started to decline. From 1987–88 to 1991–92, the team finished last in their division every season, with three of those finishes landing them last in the league. This included a dreadful 12-win season in 1989–90 that is still the worst in franchise history. As a result, the team earned three consecutive first overall draft picks, used to select Mats Sundin (1989), Owen Nolan (1990), and Eric Lindros (1991). Lindros made it clear he did not wish to play for the Nordiques, to the extent he did not wear the team's jersey for the press photographs, only holding it when it was presented to him. On advice from his mother, he refused to sign a contract and began a holdout that lasted over a year. On June 30, 1992, he was traded to the Philadelphia Flyers in exchange for five players, the rights to Swedish prospect Peter Forsberg, two first-round draft picks, and US$15 million. The Eric Lindros trade turned the moribund Nordiques into a Stanley Cup contender almost overnight, and is seen in hindsight as one of the most one-sided deals in sports history. In the first season after the trade, 1992–93, the Nordiques reached the playoffs for the first time in six years. Two years later, they won the Northeast Division and had the second best regular season record during the lockout-shortened season.

While the team experienced on-ice success, it spent most of its first 23 years struggling financially. Quebec City was by far the smallest market in the NHL, and the changing financial environment in the NHL made things even more difficult. In 1995, team owner Marcel Aubut asked for a bailout from Quebec's provincial government as well as a new publicly funded arena. The bailout fell through, and Aubut subsequently began talks with COMSAT Entertainment Group in Denver, which already owned the Denver Nuggets. In May 1995, COMSAT announced an agreement in principle to purchase the team. The deal became official on July 1, 1995, and 12,000 season tickets were sold in the 37 days after the announcement of the move.

COMSAT considered several names for the team, including "Extreme," "Blizzards," and "Black Bears." It also debated whether to brand the team as a Denver team or as a regional franchise representing either Colorado or the entire Rocky Mountain region. Initially, COMSAT filed for copyright protection for "Black Bears", but reportedly decided to name the team Rocky Mountain Extreme. When The Denver Post leaked the intended name, fan reaction was so negative that COMSAT reconsidered and chose the name Colorado Avalanche. The new name was revealed on August 10, 1995. With the move, the newly relocated team transferred to the Pacific Division of the Western Conference.

=== Colorado Avalanche (1995–present) ===
==== Early success (1995–2001) ====
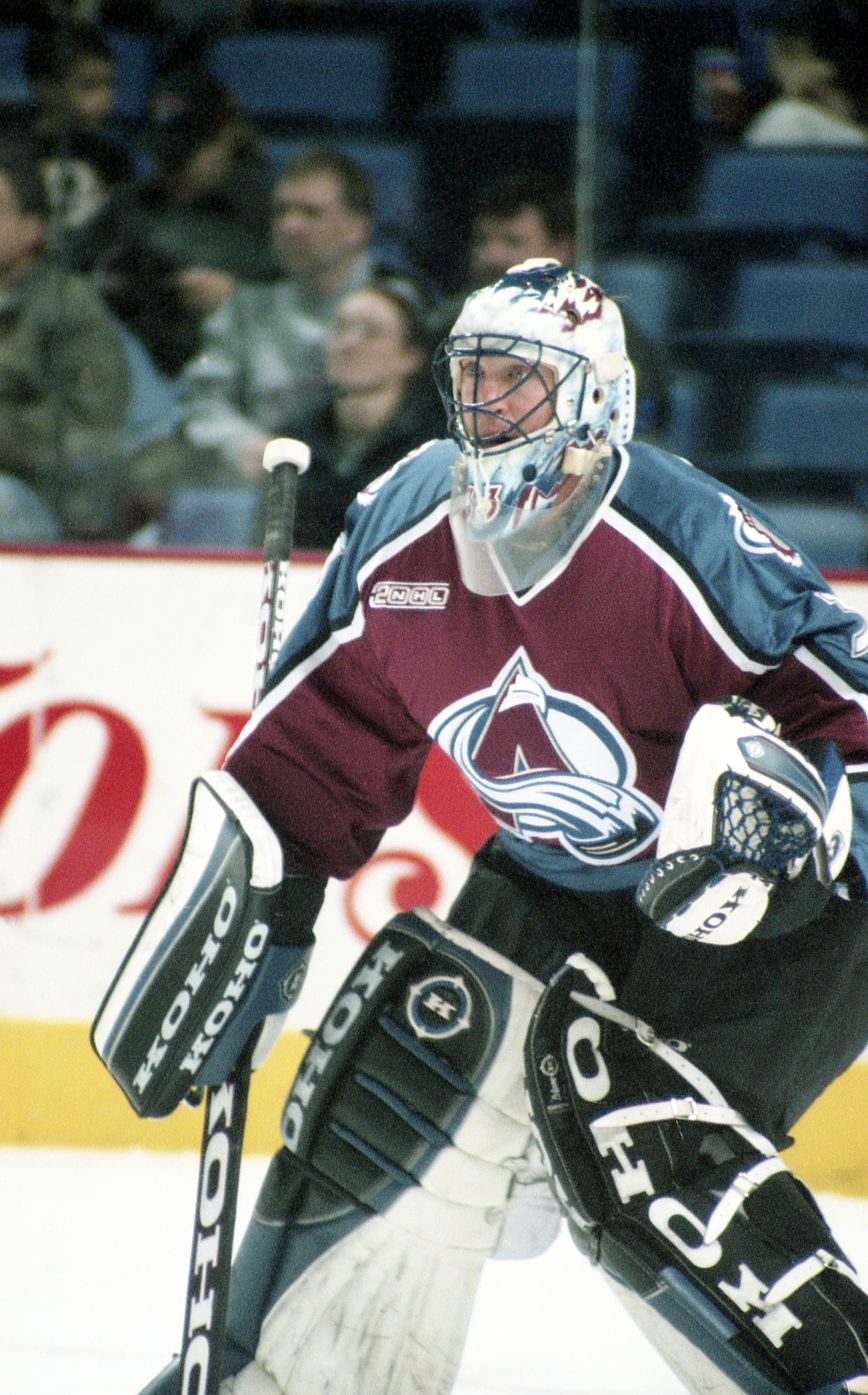
Patrick Roy played for the Avalanche from 1995 to 2003.

After purchasing the team, COMSAT organized its Denver sports franchises under a separate subsidiary, Ascent Entertainment Group Inc., which went public in 1995. COMSAT retained an 80% controlling interest, with the other 20% available on NASDAQ. The Avalanche played their first game in the McNichols Sports Arena in Denver on October 6, 1995, winning 3–2 against the Detroit Red Wings. It marked a return of the NHL to Denver after an absence of 13 years, when the Colorado Rockies (not to be confused with the Major League Baseball team of the same name) moved to New Jersey to become the New Jersey Devils. Valeri Kamensky scored the first goal as the Avalanche, as well as the game-winning goal in the final minutes. Led on the ice by captain Joe Sakic, forward Peter Forsberg, and defenseman Adam Foote and with Pierre Lacroix as the general manager and Marc Crawford as the head coach, the Avalanche became stronger when All-Star Montreal Canadiens goaltender Patrick Roy joined the team, on December 6, 1995, together with ex-Montreal captain Mike Keane in a trade for Jocelyn Thibault, Martin Ručinský, and Andrei Kovalenko.

==== 1995–96 Stanley Cup champions ====
The Avalanche finished the regular season with a 47–25–10 record for 104 points, won the Pacific Division, and finished second in the Western Conference. Colorado progressed to the playoffs, defeating the Vancouver Canucks, Chicago Blackhawks, and the Presidents' Trophy-winning Detroit Red Wings in the conference finals, all in six games. In the Stanley Cup Final, the Avalanche met the Florida Panthers, who were also in their first Cup Final series. The Avalanche swept the series 4–0. In Game 4, during the third overtime and after more than 100 minutes of play with no goals, defenseman Uwe Krupp scored to claim the franchise's first Stanley Cup. Joe Sakic was the playoff's scoring leader with 34 points (18 goals and 16 assists), winning the Conn Smythe Trophy. The 1995–96 Cup was the first major professional championship won by a Denver team. The Avalanche are the only team in NHL history to win the Stanley Cup their first season after a move, and only the second team to win a championship their first season after a move in any of the four major North American sports leagues, following the NFL's Washington Commanders. They also became the second team from the WHA to win the Cup. With the Cup win, Russians Alexei Gusarov and Valeri Kamensky, and Swede Peter Forsberg became members of the Triple Gold Club, the exclusive group of ice hockey players who have won Olympic gold, World Championship gold, and the Stanley Cup.

In 1996–97, Colorado won the Pacific Division again as well as the Presidents' Trophy for finishing the regular season with the best record in the NHL, at 49–24–9 for 107 points. The team was also the NHL's best scoring with an average of 3.38 goals scored per game. The Avalanche met the two lowest scorers of the Western Conference in the first two rounds of the playoffs, the Chicago Blackhawks and the Edmonton Oilers, defeating them in six and five games, respectively. During a rematch of the previous year conference finals, the Avalanche lost to the Detroit Red Wings in six games. Detroit went on to sweep the Stanley Cup Final just as the Avalanche had done the year before. Sandis Ozoliņš was elected for the NHL's first All-Star team at the end of the season.

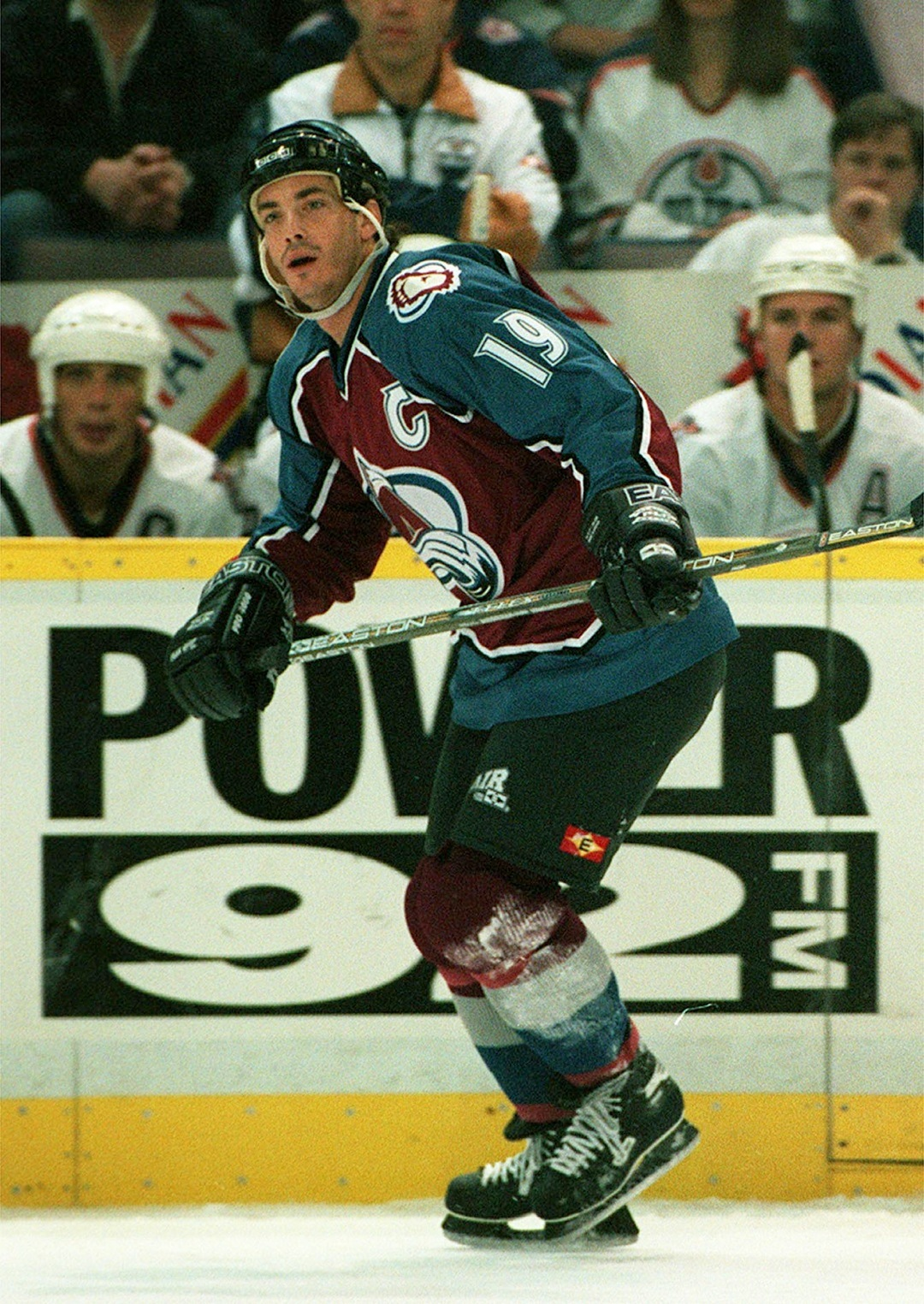
In 1997, the Avalanche matched an offer sheet on Joe Sakic, instigating salary raises throughout the NHL.

As a free agent during the summer of 1997, Joe Sakic signed a three-year, $21 million offer sheet with the New York Rangers. Under the collective agreement in place at the time between the NHL and NHL Players' Association (NHLPA), the Avalanche had one week to match the Rangers' offer or let go of Sakic. Colorado would match the offer, which instigated a salary raise for NHL players.

The Avalanche sent nine players representing seven countries, as well as head coach Marc Crawford representing Canada, to the 1998 Winter Olympics in Nagano, Japan. Alexei Gusarov and Valeri Kamensky won the silver medal with Russia, and Jari Kurri won bronze with Finland.

In the following season, Colorado won the Pacific Division with a 39–26–17 record for 95 points. The team lost in the conference quarterfinals against the Edmonton Oilers in seven games, having led the series 3–1. Peter Forsberg was the NHL's second-highest scorer in the regular season with 91 points (25 goals and 66 assists) and was elected for the NHL's First All-Star Team. After the end of the season, head coach Marc Crawford rejected the team's offer of a two-year contract. Bob Hartley was hired to the head coach position in June 1998.

In 1998–99, with the addition of the Nashville Predators, the NHL realigned their divisions, moving the Avalanche to the new Northwest Division. Despite a slow 2–6–1 start, Colorado finished with a 44–28–10 record for 98 points, won the Division and finished second in the Western Conference. Between January 10 and February 7, the Avalanche had their longest ever winning streak with 12 games. Following the Columbine High School massacre, Colorado postponed their first two playoff games to a later date; they would wear patches in honor of the Columbine victims on their jerseys during the playoffs. The series was altered to a 2–3–2 format as a result of the tragedy. After defeating both the San Jose Sharks and the Detroit Red Wings in six games in the first two rounds, Colorado met the Presidents' Trophy-winning Dallas Stars in the conference finals, where they lost in seven games. Forsberg, the playoffs' leading scorer with 24 points (8 goals and 16 assists), was again elected to the NHL's First All-Star team, and Chris Drury won the Calder Memorial Trophy for the best rookie of the season. Both Drury and Hejduk were elected to the NHL All-Rookie Team at the end of the season.

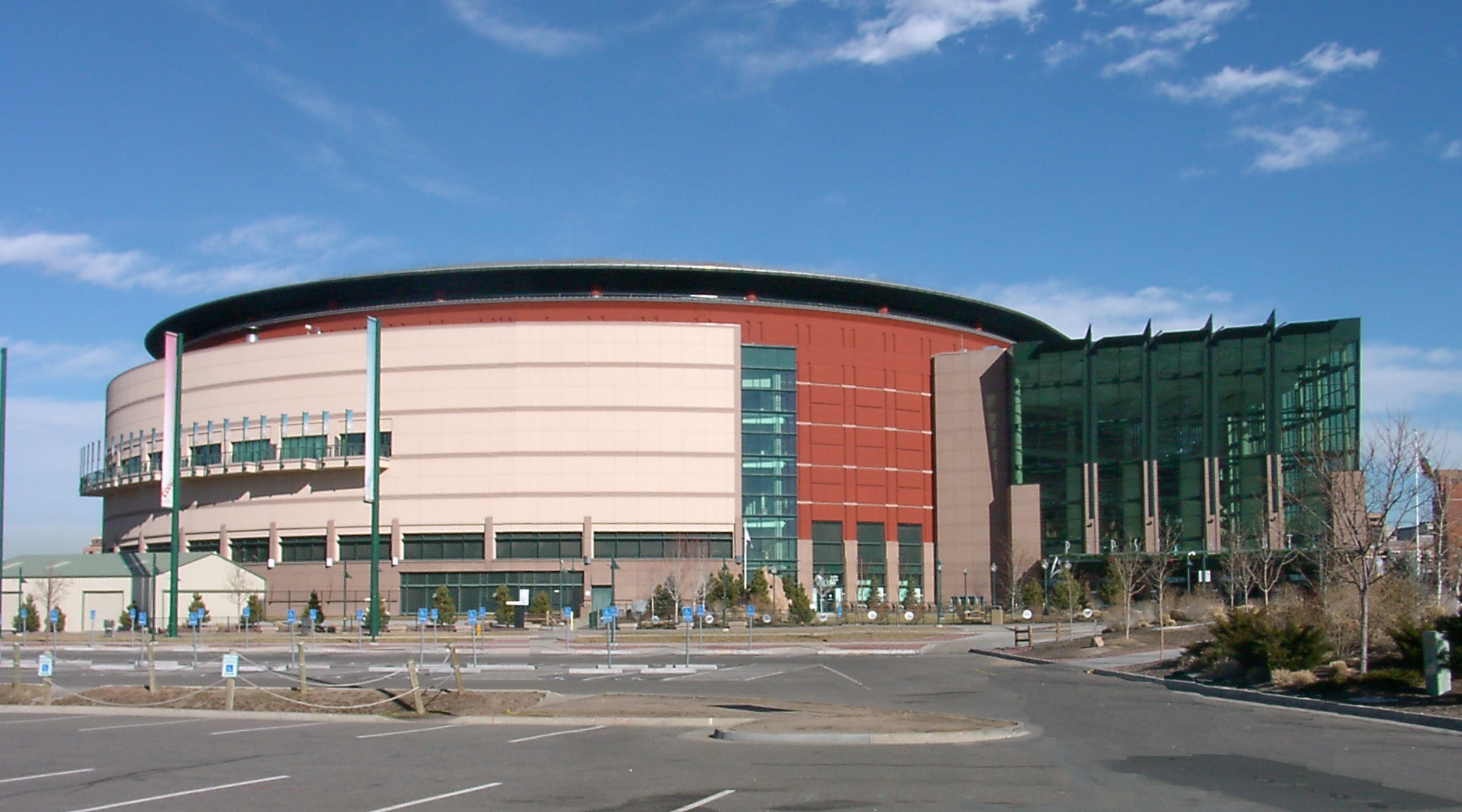
The Pepsi Center opened as the Avalanche's new home arena in 1999.

It was in the 1999–2000 season that the Colorado Avalanche played their first game in the new Pepsi Center, which cost US$160 million. Milan Hejduk scored the first goal of a 2–1 victory against the Boston Bruins on October 13, 1999. The Avalanche finished the season with a 42–28–11–1 record for 96 points, winning the Division. Before the playoffs, the Avalanche strengthened their defense for a run towards the Stanley Cup by acquiring Hockey Hall of Fame defenseman Ray Bourque and forward Dave Andreychuk. Bourque, who had been a Bruin since 1979, requested a trade to a contender for a chance to win the Stanley Cup. However, Colorado lost in the conference finals against the Dallas Stars in seven games after defeating the Phoenix Coyotes and Detroit Red Wings in five games.

The Avalanche's success came amid considerable turmoil in the front office. COMSAT's diversification into sports ownership was proving a drain on the company. Cost overruns associated with the construction of Pepsi Center had shareholders up in arms. Finally, in 1997, COMSAT agreed in principle to sell Ascent to Liberty Media. However, Liberty was not interested in sports ownership at the time (though it has since purchased Major League Baseball's Atlanta Braves), and made the deal contingent upon Ascent selling both the Avalanche and Nuggets.

After almost two years, Ascent sold the teams to Wal-Mart heirs Bill and Nancy Laurie for $400 million. However, a group of Ascent shareholders sued, claiming the sale price was several million dollars too low. Ascent then agreed to sell the teams to Denver banking tycoon Donald Sturm for $461 million.

A new wrinkle appeared when the City of Denver refused to transfer the parcel of land on which Pepsi Center stood unless Sturm promised to keep the Avalanche and Nuggets in Denver for at least 25 years. Sturm had made his bid in his own name, and the city wanted to protect taxpayers in the event Sturm either died or sold the teams. While Sturm was willing to make a long-term commitment to the city, he was not willing to be held responsible if he died or sold the teams. After negotiations fell apart, Liberty bought all of Ascent, but kept the Nuggets and Avalanche on the market.

Finally, in July 2000, the teams and the Pepsi Center were bought by real estate entrepreneur Stan Kroenke, and brother-in-law to the Lauries, in a $450 million deal, with Liberty retaining a 6.5% interest. As part of the deal, Kroenke placed the teams into a trust that would ensure they stay in Denver until at least 2025. After the deal, Kroenke organized his sports assets under Kroenke Sports Enterprises.

==== 2000–01 Stanley Cup champions ====
The 2000–01 season was the best season the team has ever had due to phenomenal play by the all-time leading scorer in Avalanche history, Joe Sakic. The Avalanche won the Division and captured their second Presidents' Trophy after having finished the regular season with 52–16–10–4 for 118 points. Sakic finished the regular season with 118 points (54 goals and 64 assists), only three behind Jaromír Jágr's 121 points. On February 4, 2001, the Avalanche hosted the 2001 NHL All-Star Game. Patrick Roy, Ray Bourque, and Joe Sakic played for the North American team, who won 14–12 against the World team, which featured Milan Hejduk and Peter Forsberg. All but Hejduk were part of the starting lineups. Before the playoffs, the Avalanche acquired star defenseman Rob Blake and center Steven Reinprecht from the Los Angeles Kings in exchange for Adam Deadmarsh, Aaron Miller, and their 2001 first-round draft pick.

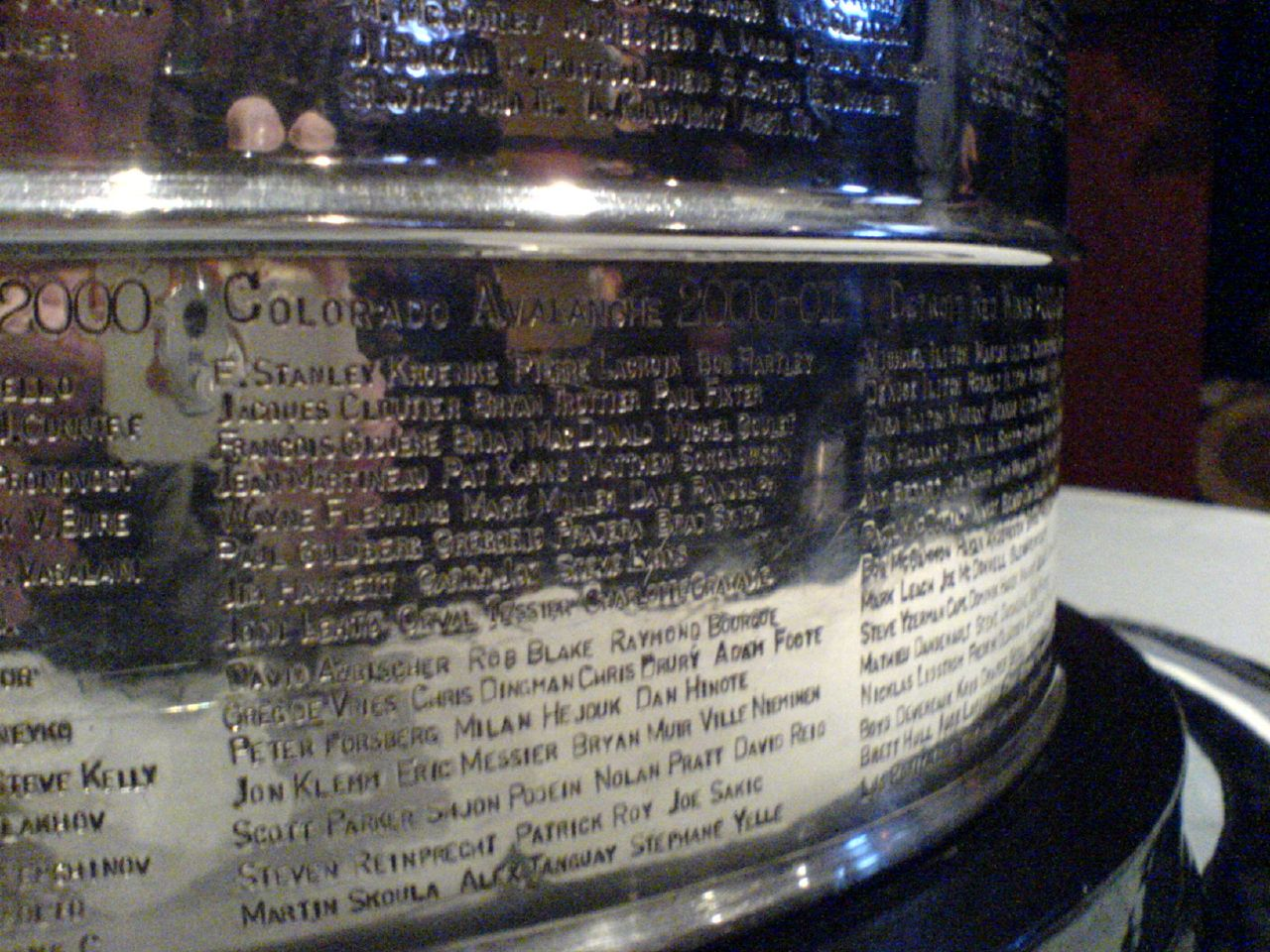
The engraved names of the 2001 Stanley Cup champions, the Colorado Avalanche.

In the playoffs, Colorado swept their conference quarterfinals against the Vancouver Canucks. In the conference semifinals, the Avalanche defeated the Los Angeles Kings in seven games, after having wasted a 3–1 lead. After the last game of the series, Peter Forsberg underwent surgery to remove a ruptured spleen and it was announced he would not play until the following season. The injury was a huge upset for the team – former NHL goaltender Darren Pang considered it "devastating... to the Colorado Avalanche". The team would overcome Forsberg's injury; in the conference finals, Colorado defeated the St. Louis Blues 4–1 and progressed to the Stanley Cup Final, where they faced the defending champion New Jersey Devils. The Avalanche came back from a 3–2 series deficit and won the series 4–3, marking the second year in a row that the defending champions lost in the Cup Final series, as the Devils themselves defeated the Dallas Stars in 2000. After being handed the Cup from NHL commissioner Gary Bettman, captain Joe Sakic immediately turned and gave it to Ray Bourque, capping off Bourque's 22-year career with his only championship. Sakic was the playoffs' leading scorer with 26 points (13 goals and 13 assists). He won the Hart Memorial Trophy, given to the NHL's most valuable player during the regular season; the Lady Byng Memorial Trophy, awarded to the player that has shown the best sportsmanship and gentlemanly conduct combined with performance in play; the Lester B. Pearson Award; and shared the NHL Plus/Minus Award with Patrik Eliáš of the Devils. Patrick Roy won the Conn Smythe Trophy as the MVP of the playoffs. Shjon Podein was awarded the King Clancy Memorial Trophy for significant humanitarian contributions to his community, namely his work on charitable organizations and his own children foundation. Ray Bourque and Joe Sakic were elected to the NHL's First All-Star Team. Rob Blake was elected to the Second All-Star Team.

==== Remaining competitive (2001–2010) ====
In the 2001–02 season, Colorado finished the regular season with 99 points from a 45–28–8–1 record, winning the Northwest Division. Colorado had the league's lowest goals conceded: 169, an average of 2.06 per game. The NHL season was interrupted by the 2002 Winter Olympics in Salt Lake City. The Avalanche had nine players representing six countries. Canada won the ice hockey tournament, with Rob Blake, Adam Foote, and Joe Sakic won gold medals. American Chris Drury took home a silver medal. With the win, Blake and Sakic became members of the Triple Gold Club. The Avalanche advanced through the first two rounds of the playoffs, winning 4–3 against the Los Angeles Kings and 4–3 against the San Jose Sharks. Patrick Roy had a shutout on the decisive game of each series. The Avalanche made the conference finals for the fourth consecutive season (and sixth overall in the last seven seasons), meeting the Detroit Red Wings in the playoffs for the fifth time in seven years. Colorado had a 3–2 lead after five games, but lost Game 6 at home, 2–0, and Game 7 in Detroit, 7–0. As in 1997, Detroit went on to win the Stanley Cup. Peter Forsberg was the playoffs' leading scorer with 27 points (9 goals, 18 assists). Roy won the William M. Jennings Trophy, given to the goaltenders of the team with fewest goals scored against. Roy and Sakic were both elected to the NHL's First All-Star Team, with Rob Blake elected to the Second All-Star Team.

The following season, 2002–03, saw the Avalanche claim the NHL record for most consecutive division titles, nine, breaking the Montreal Canadiens' streak of eight titles from 1974 to 1982. The division title came after a bad start by the team, that led to the exit of head coach Bob Hartley in December. General manager Pierre Lacroix promoted assistant coach Tony Granato, who had only three months of coaching experience as an assistant, to the head coach position. The team's playoff spot seemed in doubt at one point, but the Avalanche managed to finish with 105 points, ahead of the Vancouver Canucks by one. The race to the title was exciting, namely the second-to-last game of the season, as the Avalanche needed to win the game to stay in the race, and Milan Hejduk scored with ten seconds left in overtime to defeat the Mighty Ducks of Anaheim. The title was guaranteed in the final day of the regular season, when the Avalanche defeated the St. Louis Blues 5–2 and the Vancouver Canucks lost against the Los Angeles Kings 2–0. In the conference quarterfinals, the Avalanche blew a 3–1 series lead over the Minnesota Wild, losing in overtime in Game 7. Peter Forsberg won the Art Ross Trophy for the leading scorer of the regular season, which he finished with 106 points (29 goals, 77 assists). Forsberg also won the Hart Memorial Trophy for the regular season's most valuable player, and shared the NHL Plus/Minus Award with teammate Hejduk. Hejduk scored 50 goals to win the Maurice "Rocket" Richard Trophy, awarded annually to the leading goal scorer in the NHL. Forsberg was elected to the NHL's First All-Star Team; Hejduk was elected to the Second All-Star Team.

Patrick Roy retired after that season, and the team signed star wingers Paul Kariya from the Mighty Ducks of Anaheim, and Teemu Selänne from the San Jose Sharks. Both struggled during their first season with the team—Kariya spent most of the 2003–04 season injured and Selänne scored only 32 points (16 goals and 16 assists) in 78 games. There were doubts if goaltender David Aebischer could perform at the top level the team was used to while having Roy. Having "nine elite players", "the most talented top six forwards on one team since the days of the Edmonton Oilers" was not good enough as the franchise failed to win the Northwest Division title, ending the NHL record streak. The 40–22–13–7 record was good enough for 100 points, one less than the Northwest Division champion Vancouver Canucks. This ended a streak of nine consecutive division titles dating to the team's last year in Quebec.

During a game against Vancouver on March 8, 2004, Steve Moore was punched from behind by Vancouver's Todd Bertuzzi, leaving Moore unconscious. It was said to be retaliation for a hit Moore had delivered to Canucks captain Markus Naslund the month before. Moore sustained three fractured neck vertebrae, among other injuries caused by the hit and subsequent pile up, ending his career. Bertuzzi was away from professional hockey for 17 months as a result of suspensions. In Denver, after the Moore hit, it became tradition for the home fans to boo Todd Bertuzzi every time he gained possession of the puck, whenever his team faced the Avalanche at Pepsi Center.

In the 2004 playoffs, Colorado won the conference quarterfinals against the Dallas Stars in five games, but lost in the conference semifinals against the Sharks in six games. Joe Sakic was, once again, elected to the 2004 All-star team, winning the NHL/Sheraton Road Performer Award, and became the first Avalanche player ever to be chosen as game MVP, when he scored a hat-trick. In July 2004, Joel Quenneville was hired as head coach, while Granato was retained as his assistant.

The 2004–05 NHL season was canceled because of an unresolved lockout. During the lockout, many Avalanche players played in European leagues. David Aebischer returned home with Alex Tanguay to play for Swiss club HC Lugano; Milan Hejduk and Peter Forsberg returned to their former teams in their native countries, HC Pardubice and Modo Hockey. Nine other players from the roster played in Europe during the lockout.

After the 2004–05 lockout and implementation of a salary cap, the Avalanche were forced to release some of their top players. Peter Forsberg and Adam Foote were lost in free agency to save room in the cap for Joe Sakic and Rob Blake. Although the salary cap was a blow to one of the highest spenders of the league, the team finished the 2005–06 regular season with a 43–30–9 record for 95 points, good enough to finish second in the Division, seven behind the Calgary Flames and tied with the Edmonton Oilers. The season paused in February for the 2006 Winter Olympics in Turin, Italy. The Avalanche sent a league-leading 11 players from eight countries. Finland's Antti Laaksonen earned the silver medal, while Ossi Väänänen ended up not playing because of an injury; Milan Hejduk won a bronze medal with the Czech Republic team. In the conference quarterfinals, Colorado defeated Dallas Stars team that had the second-best record in the conference, in five games. The team was swept in the conference semifinals by the Anaheim Ducks.

The next day, Pierre Lacroix resigned after service as general manager since 1994 and François Giguère was hired as his replacement. Lacroix remained president of the franchise until spring 2013, when the team owner's son, Josh Kroenke, took over as team president and governor. Pierre Lacroix remained an advisor to the team until his death in 2020 from COVID-19.

By the beginning of the 2006–07 season, Joe Sakic and Milan Hejduk were the only two remaining members from the 2000–01 Stanley Cup-winning squad, with Sakic being the only one from the team's days in Quebec, though Hejduk was drafted by the Nordiques. Paul Stastny, son of Nordiques player Peter Šťastný, also provided a link to the franchise's past. Before the previous season's playoffs, in a move reminiscent of Patrick Roy's trade, the Avalanche traded Aebischer to the Montreal Canadiens for the Vezina Trophy-winning Jose Theodore. However, the move would not turn out to be as successful when Theodore posted a 13–15–1 record in 2006–07, with an .891 save percentage, and 3.26 goals against average (GAA). His US$6 million salary became a heavy burden for the Avalanche in the salary cap era. That same season saw an 11-year sell-out streak of 487 home games ended on October 16, 2006, in a home game against the Chicago Blackhawks, that saw the Pepsi Center under capacity by 326 seats. The sell-out streak was an all-time NHL record for the longest consecutive attendance sell-outs at home games with 487; and began on November 9, 1995, on the Avalanche's eighth regular season home game during the 1995–96 season at the McNichols Sports Arena. The record has since been broken by the Pittsburgh Penguins, who saw their own streak end in October 2021 at 633 games.

The Avalanche missed the playoffs for the 2006–07 season, missing it for the first time since 1993–94, when they were still in Quebec. The team had a 15–2–2 run in the last 19 games of the season to keep their playoffs hopes alive until the penultimate day of the season. A 4–2 loss against the Nashville Predators on April 7, with former player Peter Forsberg assisting the game-winning goal scored by another former player, Paul Kariya, eliminated Colorado from the playoff race. As consolation, the team won the last game of the season against the Calgary Flames the following day and finished fourth in the Northwest Division and ninth in the Western Conference with a 44–31–7 record for 95 points, one less than eighth-seeded Calgary. Nonetheless, the result was greater than expected by hockey pundits; Sports Illustrated previewed before the start of the season that the Avalanche would finish 13th in the Western Conference. During that last game of the season, Joe Sakic scored a goal and two assists and became the second-oldest player in NHL history to reach 100 points, behind only Gordie Howe, who had 103 points at age 40 in the 1968–69 season. During the season, Paul Stastny set an NHL record for longest point streak by a rookie, with 20 games, three more than the previous record, held by Teemu Selänne and Karlis Skrastins set a new NHL record for the longest game streak by a defenseman, with 495 games. Until the Avalanche's 2006–07 season, no team in the history of the NHL had ever made it to 95 points without earning a spot in the playoffs. In the Eastern Conference, three teams progressed to the playoffs with fewer than 95 points: the New York Rangers (94), the Tampa Bay Lightning (93) and the New York Islanders (92).

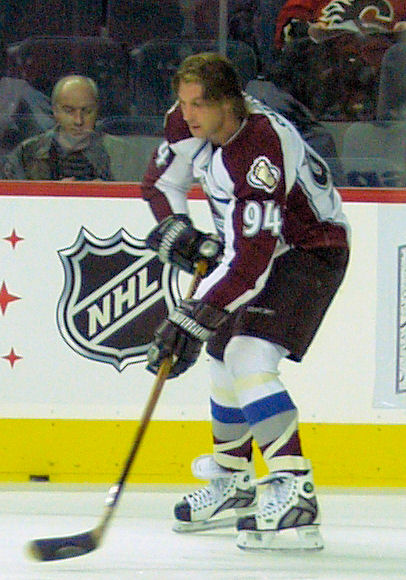
The Avalanche signed Ryan Smyth prior to the 2007–08 season.

For the 2007–08 season, the Avalanche signed two free agents: defenseman Scott Hannan and left winger Ryan Smyth. These acquisitions filled the team's needs and were expected to help make an impact in the playoffs. On February 25, 2008, unrestricted free agent Peter Forsberg signed with the Avalanche for the remainder of the 2007–08 season. A day later, at the trade deadline, they re-acquired defenseman Adam Foote from the Columbus Blue Jackets as well as Ruslan Salei from the Florida Panthers. In the conference quarterfinals, Colorado defeated the Minnesota Wild in six games. In the conference semifinals, however, the Avalanche were swept by the eventual Stanley Cup champion Detroit Red Wings.

On May 9, 2008, the Avalanche announced that Joel Quenneville would not return to coach the team next season. Two weeks later, Tony Granato was named head coach of the Avalanche for the second time.

The 2008–09 season was the worst season the Avalanche had since moving to Denver. Posting a record of 32–45–5, finishing 15th in the Western Conference (28th overall), and recording the fewest points since their days in Quebec during the 1979–80 season. The Avalanche missed the postseason for the second time in three seasons. It would be the first time in Avalanche history the team's top scorer would score less than 70 points on the season, as Milan Hejduk and Ryan Smyth would register only 59 points each. On April 13, 2009, just one day after the end of the season, the Avalanche relieved François Giguère of his general manager duties. Colorado would go on to receive the highest draft pick in Avalanche history, third overall. That pick turned out to be Brampton Battalion star Matt Duchene.

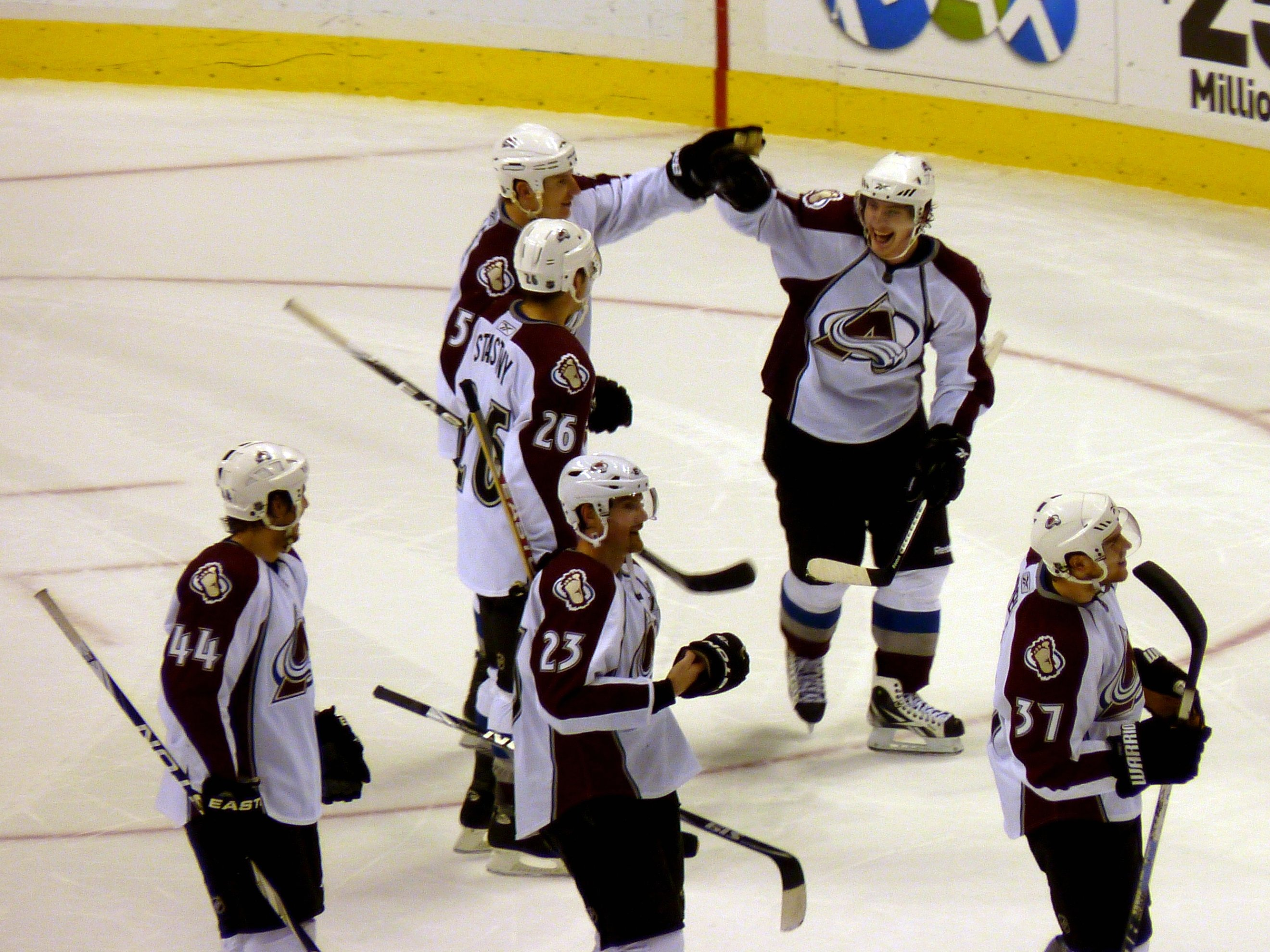
Members of the Avalanche celebrate a win against the Vancouver Canucks, clinching the eighth and final Western Conference seed for the 2010 Stanley Cup playoffs.

In the 2009 off-season, the Avalanche named Greg Sherman the new general manager and Joe Sacco the new head coach. The following month, top scorer Ryan Smyth was traded to the Los Angeles Kings and Joe Sakic, the only team captain the Avalanche had ever known, retired after 21 seasons in the NHL. The Avalanche named Adam Foote as his replacement. Sakic's jersey retirement ceremony took place on October 1, 2009, before the season opener at home against the San Jose Sharks where the Avalanche won 5–2. The Avalanche started the season off strong until the 2010 Winter Olympics break in Vancouver. Three Avalanche team members played in the Winter Olympics – Paul Stastny for the United States, Ruslan Salei for Belarus and Peter Budaj for Slovakia. Following the Winter Olympics, the Avalanche struggled but eventually clinched a playoff spot with 95 points on the season, a 26-point improvement from the previous year's effort, and good enough for eighth place in the Western Conference. The Avalanche fell in the conference quarterfinals to the top-seeded San Jose Sharks in six games.

Stan Kroenke purchased full ownership in the NFL's St. Louis Rams in 2010. Since the NFL does not allow its owners to hold majority control of major-league teams in other NFL cities, Kroenke turned over day-to-day control of the Nuggets and Avalanche to his son, Josh, toward the end of 2010. Kroenke had to sell his controlling interest in both teams by 2014.

In 2010, the Avalanche made it to the playoffs but lost in the conference quarterfinals 4–2 against San Jose. Joe Sacco finished third in Jack Adams Trophy voting that season.

==== Decline (2010–2017) ====
In the 2010–11 season, the Avalanche saw their worst season yet since moving to Denver. They only had 68 points in the standings and had winless streaks after the All-Star break. They finished 29th in the 30-team NHL, besting only their division mates, the Edmonton Oilers. Matt Duchene set a franchise record as the youngest scoring leader in Quebec/Colorado history with 67 points, sharing the club goals-leader title with David Jones. Former Avalanche player Peter Forsberg attempted a comeback in the NHL with Colorado mid-season. However, after two games, no points and compiling a plus-minus rating of −4, Forsberg announced his retirement from professional hockey. Captain Adam Foote also retired after the final game of the season.

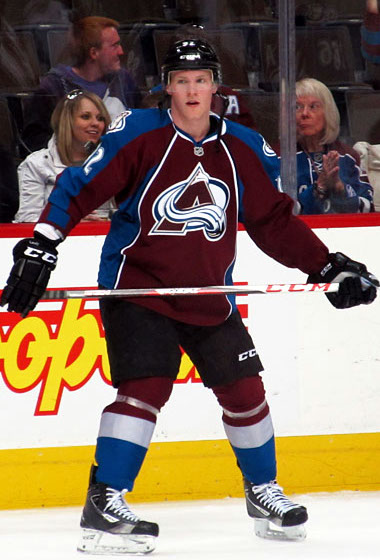
Gabriel Landeskog during his rookie season. Landeskog was selected second overall in the 2011 NHL entry draft.

In the off-season, Colorado had two first-round picks. Present at the draft, former Avalanche great Joe Sakic served his first duties as new alternate governor and adviser of hockey operations of the club. With their first pick, second overall, they selected Gabriel Landeskog, the young captain of the Ontario Hockey League's Kitchener Rangers. Second, they selected defenseman Duncan Siemens 11th overall, a pick acquired from the St. Louis Blues in the controversial trade that sent power-forward Chris Stewart, long time top prospect Kevin Shattenkirk and a second-round pick to the Blues in exchange for their first-round pick, veteran Jay McClement and 2006 former first overall pick, Erik Johnson. A complete overhaul at the goal-tending position sent Peter Budaj to the Montreal Canadiens and Brian Elliott to St. Louis, Elliott having been acquired from the Ottawa Senators for Craig Anderson during the team's downward spiral the season previous. Goaltender Semyon Varlamov was dealt to Colorado from the Washington Capitals in exchange for a first and second pick, while veteran netminder and former Conn Smythe Trophy winner Jean-Sébastien Giguère was signed as a free agent in hopes to mentor the young Varlamov. Duncan Siemens was sent back to his major junior team, the Saskatoon Blades in camp, while Gabriel Landeskog made the opening night roster against the Red Wings on October 8, 2011, at Pepsi Center. Adam Deadmarsh was promoted from video/developmental coach to offensive assistant coach after Steve Konowalchuk accepted a job as head coach in the minor league.

Peter Forsberg's number 21 became the fourth jersey number retired by the Avalanche on opening night, a contest Colorado would lose to Detroit 3–0. Colorado redeemed themselves in game two of the season on October 10, 2011, against the 2011 Stanley Cup champion Boston Bruins. Varlamov negated all 30 shots registered by Boston and posted the fifth shutout of his career and first win as an Avalanche in the regular season. Milan Hejduk scored the game-winning goal and first goal of the season for the club in a 1–0 victory over the defending champions. In April 2012, the Avalanche were eliminated from playoff contention and finished 11th place in the Western Conference. Despite a 20-point improvement from last season's efforts, the team failed to reach the playoffs for the second-straight year, the first time the club history since their move to Denver. Head coach Joe Sacco signed a two-year contract extension shortly after the end of the season. Stand out rookie Gabriel Landeskog overtook Matt Duchene as the youngest in franchise history to lead the team in goals, scoring 22 in 82 games.

Having resigned most of their free agents, the club wouldn't see much change in the 2012 off-season, with the exception of losing unrestricted free agents Peter Mueller, Jay McClement and Kevin Porter. Colorado would add Greg Zanon, John Mitchell and high scoring winger P. A. Parenteau to its roster. Gabriel Landeskog, the Avalanche's lone representative at the 2012 NHL Awards, won the Calder Memorial Trophy, joining Chris Drury, Peter Forsberg and Peter Stastny for earning top rookie honors for the Avalanche.

On September 4, 2012, Gabriel Landeskog was named the fourth captain of the Avalanche. Milan Hejduk relinquished the captaincy a week earlier. At 19 years and 286 days old, Landeskog became the youngest captain in NHL history at that time, being 11 days younger than when Sidney Crosby was named captain of the Pittsburgh Penguins at 19 years and 297 days.

After a disappointing 2012–13 season which saw the Colorado Avalanche finish 15th in the Conference and 29th overall in the League, it was announced on April 28, 2013, that head coach Joe Sacco had been relieved of his duties. On May 10, it was announced that former long-time Avalanche captain and Hockey Hall of Famer Joe Sakic would be named executive vice president of hockey operations, overseeing all matters involving hockey personnel. It was also announced that Josh Kroenke, son of owner Stan Kroenke, was named president of the Avalanche, succeeding Pierre Lacroix. On May 23, Patrick Roy returned to the Avalanche as head coach and vice president of hockey operations. Although Sherman retained his role as general manager, he was largely reduced to an advisory role. Roy and Sakic shared most of the duties held by a general manager on most other NHL teams, though Sakic had the final say on hockey matters. The Avalanche held the top overall pick in the 2013 NHL draft, which they used to draft Nathan MacKinnon, who had previously played against the team that Patrick Roy had coached in the Quebec Major Junior Hockey League (QMJHL).

Under Roy, in 2013–14, the Avalanche returned to the playoffs, finishing first in the Central Division and second in the Western Conference, but would lose a seven-game series to the Minnesota Wild in the first round. Nonetheless, for his outstanding job as a first-year coach, Roy won the Jack Adams Award for the NHL's top coaching honors.

Just prior to the start of the 2014–15 season, Sakic was given the title of general manager while Sherman was demoted to assistant general manager, formalizing the de facto arrangement that had been in place since 2013. Despite the front office changes, the Avalanche failed to qualify for the 2015 playoffs after finishing with a record of 39–31–12, resulting in a seventh-place finish in the Central Division.

After failing to qualify for the playoffs again following the 2015–16 season, Roy resigned his posts on August 11, 2016.

Following the departure of Roy, the Avalanche hired Jared Bednar from the Calder Cup champions, the Lake Erie Monsters of the American Hockey League (AHL), as head coach. Bednar walked into a difficult situation. He was hired just a month before the opening of training camp, and thus had nowhere near enough time to install his own system. He was also unable to bring his own staff, having to make do with holdovers from Roy's staff. On December 10, 2016, the Avalanche allowed ten goals in a 10–1 loss to the Canadiens. The Avalanche closed out their season with a record of 22–56–4 and 48 points, the worst record in the league and the franchise's worst since moving to Denver (only the 1989–90 and 1990–91 Nordiques finished with fewer points). It was also the worst record of any team in the NHL since the Atlanta Thrashers finished with a record of 14–61–7 and 39 points in the 1999–2000 season (which was their first season in the league) and one of the worst for a non-expansion team since 1967. During the 2017 NHL draft, Colorado held the fourth overall pick, which they used to draft defenseman Cale Makar.

==== Return to prominence and third Presidents' Trophy (2017–2021) ====
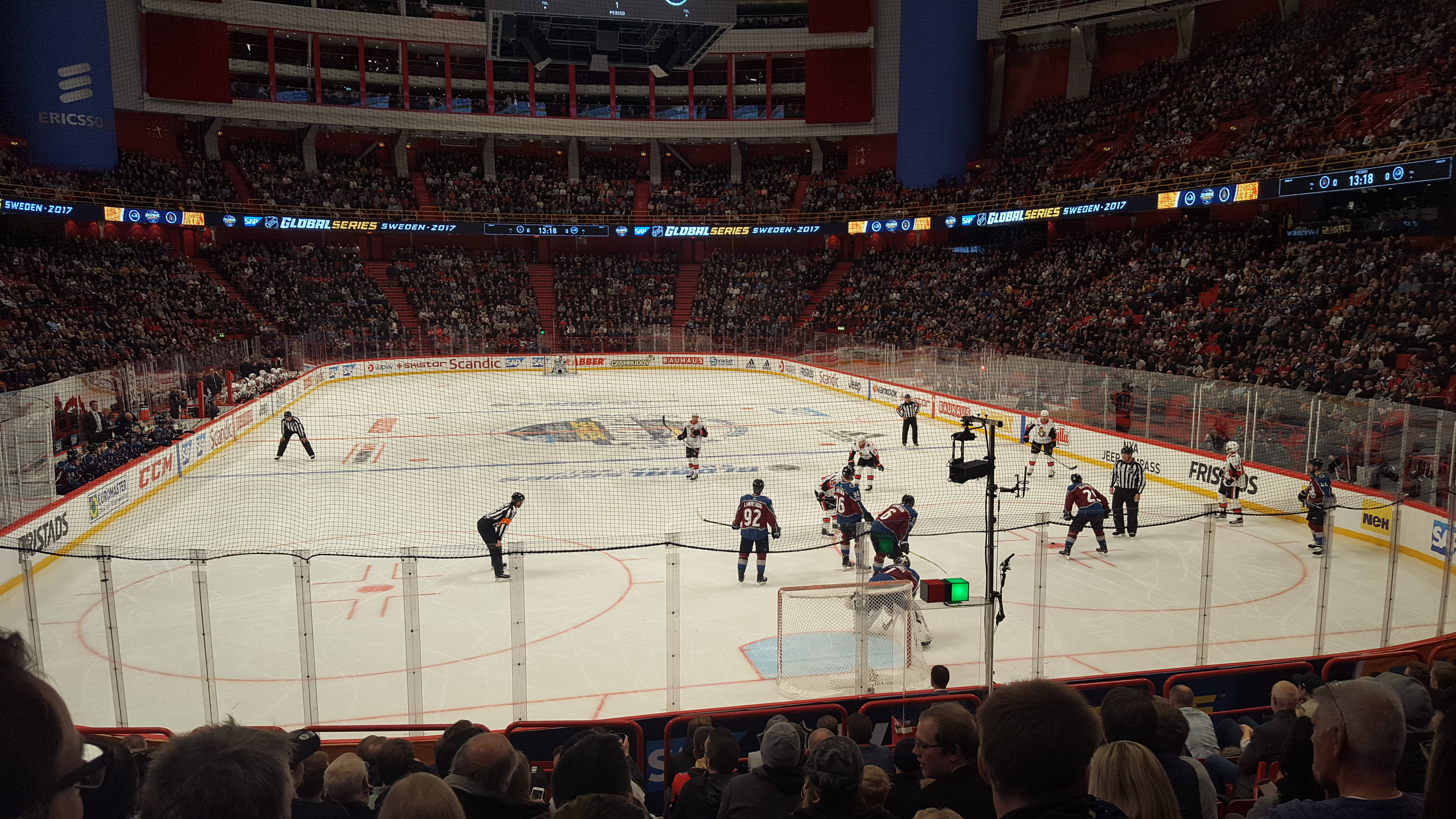
The Avalanche played the Ottawa Senators twice in November 2017, at the Ericsson Globe in Sweden.

After much speculation about wanting out of Colorado, the Avalanche traded Duchene to the Ottawa Senators in a three-team trade on November 5, 2017. From Ottawa, the Avalanche acquired Andrew Hammond, Shane Bowers, a 2018 first-round pick and a 2019 third-round pick. Additionally, the Avalanche acquired Samuel Girard, Vladislav Kamenev and a 2018 second-round pick from the Predators. The Avalanche had a ten-game win streak from January 2 to 22. During that stretch, the Avalanche outscored their opponents 41–16. Offensively, the Avalanche were led by Nathan MacKinnon and Mikko Rantanen. MacKinnon finished fifth in league scoring with 97 points, while Rantanen scored 84 points in his sophomore season. The Avalanche qualified for the playoffs in their final game of the regular season, defeating the Blues, who they were battling with for the final wild-card spot, 5–2. The team finished with 95 points, a 47-point increase from their previous season. The Avalanche matched up with the Presidents' Trophy-winning Nashville Predators in the first round. After finding themselves down 3–1, the Avalanche rallied to win Game 5 2–1 after scoring two goals late in the third period. With Varlamov and Jonathan Bernier both out with injuries, Hammond started the game, making a career-high 44 saves. However, the Predators blanked the Avalanche 5–0 in Game 6 to win the series.

On November 18, 2018, the Avalanche earned its 1,000th win in team history, defeating the Ducks in overtime. On May 2, 2019, it was announced that the City of Denver and KSE reached an agreement to keep both the Avalanche and Nuggets in the city until 2040. The Avalanche returned to the playoffs in the 2019 season, finishing again in the final wild-card spot. However, the Avalanche were able to defeat the Calgary Flames in five games, with rookie Cale Makar scoring in his first career game during game 3. The Avalanche would then get eliminated in game 7 of the second round by the San Jose Sharks.

During the 2019 off-season, the Avalanche traded long time defenseman Tyson Barrie to the Toronto Maple Leafs along with Alexander Kerfoot and a sixth-round pick in exchange for Nazem Kadri, Calle Rosen, and a third-round pick. The Avalanche improved their record significantly and were sitting at second in their division when the COVID-19 pandemic paused the 2019–20 season in March 2020. When the NHL resumed their season in September, the Avalanche defeated the Arizona Coyotes in the first round, before being eliminated in game 7 by the Dallas Stars in second round.

Following the 2020 playoffs, the Avalanche acquired Devon Toews from the New York Islanders in exchange for second-round picks in the 2021 and 2022. The Avalanche continued to improve and finished the regular season with the Presidents' Trophy. The Avalanche started the postseason with six straight wins, including a sweep over the St. Louis Blues in the first round and a 7–1 in game 1 of the second round against the Vegas Golden Knights. However, despite the Avalanche building a 2–0 series lead over Vegas, they failed to win another game of the series and were eliminated in six games. This loss marked their third straight second round exit.

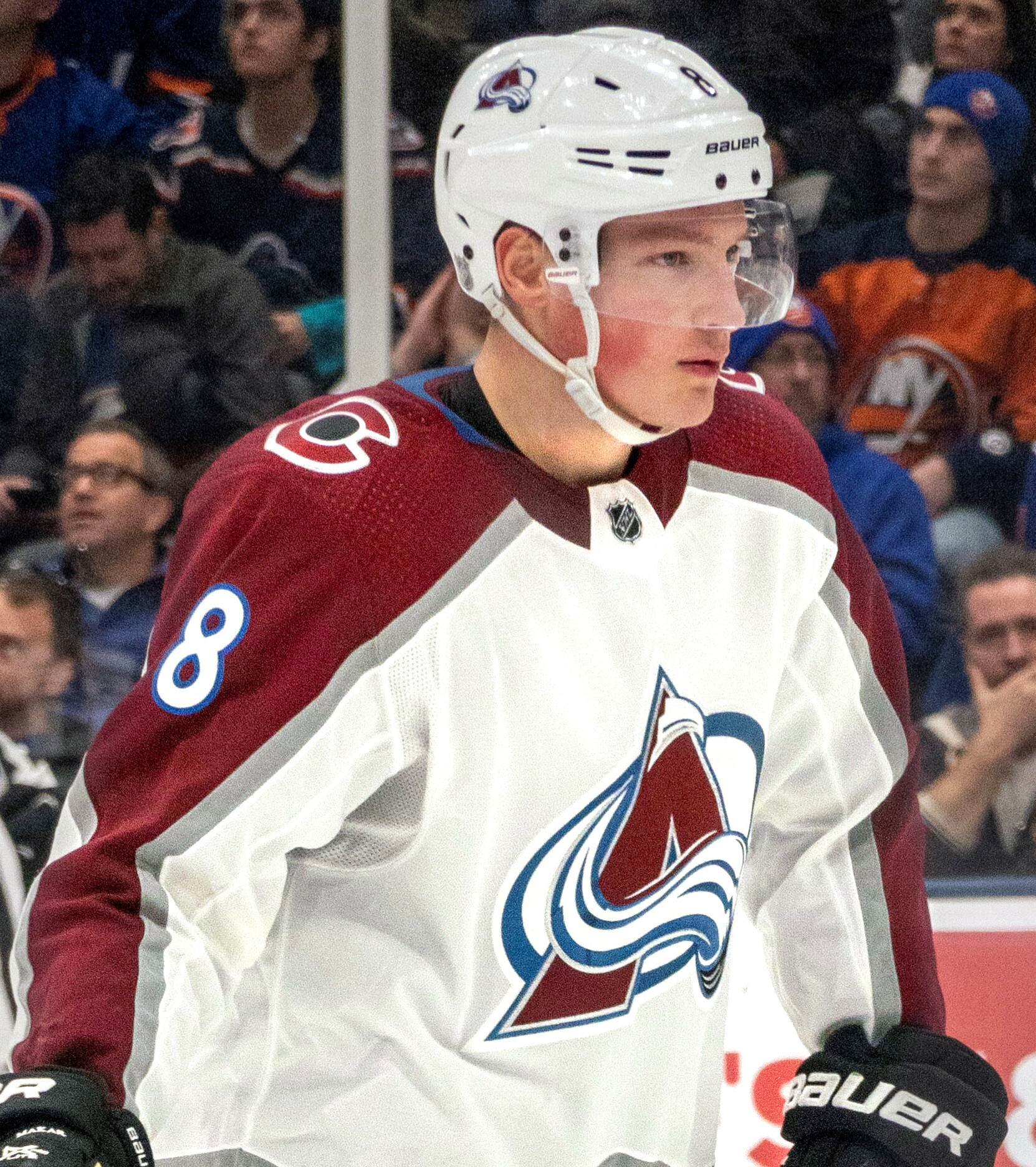
Cale Makar won the Conn Smythe Trophy following the team's victory in the 2022 Stanley Cup Final.

==== 2021–22 Stanley Cup champions ====
During the 2021 off-season, goaltender Philipp Grubauer left during free agency and signed a contract with the Seattle Kraken. To address the need for a goaltender, the Avalanche traded Conor Timmins and a 2022 first-round pick in exchange for Darcy Kuemper. In the 2021–22 season, the Avalanche finished with 119 points, qualifying for the playoffs for a fifth-straight season, the top seed in the west and second in the league overall, finishing only behind the Florida Panthers for the Presidents' Trophy. They began the 2022 playoffs with a sweep over the Nashville Predators before defeating the St. Louis Blues in six games to advance to the conference finals for the first time in 20 years. The Avalanche then swept the Edmonton Oilers to reach the Stanley Cup Final for the first time since 2001. On June 26, 2022, the Avalanche won their third Stanley Cup in franchise history, defeating the two-time defending champion Tampa Bay Lightning in six games. Following their victory, the Avalanche had finished the postseason 16–4, which tied for the best postseason record since the Los Angeles Kings in the 2012 playoffs. Cale Makar was named the winner of the Conn Smythe and Norris Memorial trophies, following his exceptional regular season and playoff performances.

==== Mixed success, fourth Presidents' Trophy (2022–present) ====
In the following season, the Avalanche finished as division champions, but were upset by the Seattle Kraken in seven games in the first round of the 2023 playoffs.

In the 2023–24 season, the Avalanche finished third in the Central Division. They eliminated the Winnipeg Jets in five games in the opening round of the 2024 playoffs, and then lost to the Dallas Stars in six games in the second round.

The 2024–25 season had the Avalanche again finishing third in the division and being eliminated by the Stars, this time in a seven-game series in the first round.

In 2025–26, the Avalanche won the Presidents' Trophy for the fourth time, with 55 victories in the regular season, but were swept by the Vegas Golden Knights in the conference finals.

== Team information ==
=== Logo ===
From 1995 to 2015, the Avalanche's alternate logo was the foot of a Yeti.

The Colorado Avalanche logo is composed by a burgundy letter A with snow wrapped around, similar to an avalanche. There is a hockey puck in the lower–right end of the snow and a steel blue oval on the background.

The team's original alternate logo was the foot of a Yeti and was seen on the shoulders of the Avalanche's home and away jerseys. The logo was used on their jerseys since 1995; however, prior to the start of the 2015 NHL entry draft, the club unveiled a new alternate logo. The new logo features the insignia taken from the Colorado state flag and re-colored to match the team's color scheme. The logo was featured on a patch located on the shoulders of the team's uniforms, along with a 20th-anniversary logo, for the 2015–16 season.

=== Jerseys ===
The team colors are burgundy, steel blue, black, silver, and white. For the 2007–08 season, the NHL introduced the new-look "Reebok EDGE" jerseys. The Avalanche debuted their new version of the Reebok EDGE jerseys on September 12, 2007, at an Avalanche press conference. The design is similar to the previous jerseys, with some added piping.

The road jersey from 1995 to 2003 was predominantly burgundy and steel blue in color. Along the jersey, there are two black and white zigzag lines, one on the shoulders, and the other near the belly. Between them, the jersey is burgundy; outside those lines it is steel blue. Similar lines exist around the neck. The Avalanche logo is in the center of the jersey. On top of the shoulders, there is an alternate logo, one on each side. The away jersey is similar but with different colors. The burgundy part on the home jersey is white on the away jersey, the steel blue part is burgundy, and the black and white lines became gray and steel blue. In 2003, the NHL switched home and road jerseys, with colors being worn at home and white jerseys on the road.

The Avalanche introduced a third jersey during the 2001–02 season. It is predominantly burgundy. "Colorado" is spelled in a diagonal across the jersey where the logo is on the other jerseys. From the belly down, three large horizontal stripes, the first and the last being black and the middle one being white. In the middle of the arms, there are five stripes, black, white, and burgundy from the outside inside on both sides. On the shoulders is the primary "A" logo. The third jersey was not worn by the Avalanche for the 2007–08 or the 2008–09 seasons after the NHL switched to the Reebok EDGE jerseys.

In the 2009–10 season, the Avalanche introduced a new third jersey that was worn for the first time during the November 14, 2009, home game against the Vancouver Canucks. It is similar to the club's previous third jersey, but is primarily steel blue instead of burgundy and features burgundy patches on the shoulders with the "A" logo inside. It also does not have horizontal striping on the bottom. On the arms, there are five stripes, burgundy, white, and black from the outside inside on both sides. They are closer to the elbows than the stripes on the previous third jerseys.

Prior to the 2015–16 season, the Avalanche modified their existing uniform set by replacing the yeti foot shoulder logo in favor of the burgundy and black "C" logo. A new third jersey was also unveiled, featuring navy (instead of steel blue) as the dominant color, and a minimalized, recolored version of the Rockies logo in front.

The "C" logo also served as the main crest of the Avalanche's 2016 Stadium Series uniforms, which featured a white base, enlarged lettering and numbers, and steel blue, silver, and burgundy sleeve stripes.

Before the 2017–18 season, the Avalanche unveiled new uniforms as part of the switch to Adidas. The look was inspired from the original uniforms they wore from 1995 to 2007, save for the bold silver border that pays homage to Colorado's silver mining industry. There were no third jerseys used during that season, but for the 2018–19 season, the Avalanche would wear their 2015–2017 navy uniforms as their alternates. The navy uniforms are currently used in regular season home games against Central Division opponents (though during the 2020–21 season, they only wore them against the Minnesota Wild and St. Louis Blues as both Central Division teams were briefly realigned with the Avalanche on the West Division, and made an exception in the 2021, 2022 and 2023 home openers by wearing burgundy uniforms against the Chicago Blackhawks, and in the 2025 home opener against the Utah Mammoth, as well as the November 21, 2022, home game against the Dallas Stars by wearing the "Reverse Retro" uniforms), which the Avalanche dub as "Division Rivalry Nights".

As part of the 2020 Stadium Series, the Avalanche unveiled special edition uniforms inspired by Colorado's majestic landscape and the Cadet Chapel of the United States Air Force Academy. The uniforms bore a steel blue top and burgundy bottom, with white accents forming the shape of an "A" in front and the middle stripe at the back.

Before the 2020–21 season, the Avalanche unveiled a "Reverse Retro" alternate uniform. The design was taken from the classic Quebec Nordiques uniforms but recolored to match the Avalanche's current color scheme. The Avalanche also revealed a new color scheme for their pants and helmets, with black replaced by steel blue. The following season, the road white uniforms were tweaked to feature burgundy player names and steel blue numbers with burgundy trim, thus eliminating black from the color scheme.

A second "Reverse Retro" uniform (branded as Reverse Retro 2.0) was unveiled in the 2022–23 season, utilizing the 1995–2007 white uniform template but recolored to the blue, red and gold colors originally used by the NHL's Rockies and is found on the Colorado state flag. The "C" alternate logo replaced the primary in front.

In the 2025–26 season, the Avalanche paid tribute to the Nordiques by wearing that franchise's classic baby blue uniforms for eight (originally seven) games. This includes two throwback-themed games against the Carolina Hurricanes, who wore Hartford Whalers throwbacks as a tribute to both teams' storied history in the WHA and in the NHL's Adams Division; along with two games against ex-provincial rival Montreal Canadiens (the game at Montreal was not included in the original plan, but was approved by the NHL later on).

=== Broadcasters ===
Avalanche games air on co-owned regional sports network Altitude Sports and Entertainment since 2004, replacing FSN Rocky Mountain. Radio broadcasts air on the Altitude Radio Network, fronted by KKSE AM-FM in Denver and including stations in Colorado, New Mexico, South Dakota and Wyoming.

Peter McNab, the long-time color commentator for the Colorado Avalanche from 1995 until his death in 2022, is honored inside Ball Arena with a banner under broadcast booth.

- Marc Moser – TV play-by-play
- Mark Rycroft – TV color commentator
- John-Michael Liles – TV studio analyst
- Kyle Keefe – TV studio host
- Conor McGahey – Radio play-by-play/analyst
- Mark Bertagnolli – Radio studio host
- Alan Roach – Public address

== Season-by-season record ==
This is a partial list of the last five seasons completed by the Avalanche. For the full season-by-season history, see List of Colorado Avalanche seasons

Note: GP = Games played, W = Wins, L = Losses, T = Ties, OTL = Overtime Losses, Pts = Points, GF = Goals for, GA = Goals against

Season	GP	W	L	OTL	Pts	GF	GA	Finish	Playoffs
2021–22	82	56	19	7	119	312	234	1st, Central	Stanley Cup champions, 4–2 (Lightning)
2022–23	82	51	24	7	109	289	226	1st, Central	Lost in first round, 3–4 (Kraken)
2023–24	82	50	25	7	107	304	254	3rd, Central	Lost in second round, 2–4 (Stars)
2024–25	82	49	29	4	102	277	234	3rd, Central	Lost in first round, 3–4 (Stars)
2025–26	82	55	16	11	121	302	203	1st, Central	Lost in conference finals, 0–4 (Golden Knights)

== Players and personnel ==
=== Current roster ===
Updated November 15, 2026

No.	Nat	Player	Pos	S/G	Age	Acquired	Birthplace
39	(Canada)	Mackenzie Blackwood	G	L	29	2024	Thunder Bay, Ontario
54	(United States)	Gavin Brindley	RW	R	22	2025	Estero, Florida
84	(Canada)	Brent Burns	D	R	41	2025	Barrie, Ontario
28	(United States)	Alex Gagne	D	L	24	2025	Bedford, New Hampshire
13	(Canada)	T. J. Hughes	C	R	25	2026	Hamilton, Ontario
47	(Canada)	Noah Juulsen	D	R	29	2026	Surrey, British Columbia
91	(Canada)	Nazem Kadri	C	L	36	2026	London, Ontario
17	(Canada)	Parker Kelly	C	L	27	2024	Camrose, Alberta
27	(Canada)	Brett Kulak	D	L	32	2026	Stony Plain, Alberta
68	(Canada)	Zachary L'Heureux	LW	L	23	2026	Montreal, Quebec
92	(Sweden)	Gabriel Landeskog (C)	LW	L	33	2011	Stockholm, Sweden
62	(Finland)	Artturi Lehkonen	LW	L	31	2022	Piikkiö, Finland
29	(Canada)	Nathan MacKinnon (A)	C	R	31	2013	Halifax, Nova Scotia
8	(Canada)	Cale Makar (A)	D	R	28	2017	Calgary, Alberta
70	(United States)	Sam Malinski	D	R	28	2023	Lakeville, Minnesota
42	(United States)	Josh Manson	D	R	35	2022	Hinsdale, Illinois
88	(Czech Republic)	Martin Nečas	C	R	27	2025	Nové Město na Moravě, Czech Republic
11	(United States)	Brock Nelson	C	L	35	2025	Warroad, Minnesota
25	(United States)	Logan O'Connor	RW	R	30	2018	Missouri City, Texas
5	(United States)	Mike Reilly	D	L	33	2026	Chicago, Illinois
10	(Canada)	Nicolas Roy	C	R	29	2026	Amos, Quebec
71	(Canada)	Jaden Schwartz	LW	L	34	2026	Melfort, Saskatchewan
9	(Russia)	Fedor Svechkov	C	L	23	2026	Tolyatti, Russia
7	(Canada)	Devon Toews	D	L	32	2020	Abbotsford, British Columbia
41	(Canada)	Scott Wedgewood	G	L	34	2024	Brampton, Ontario

=== Team captains ===
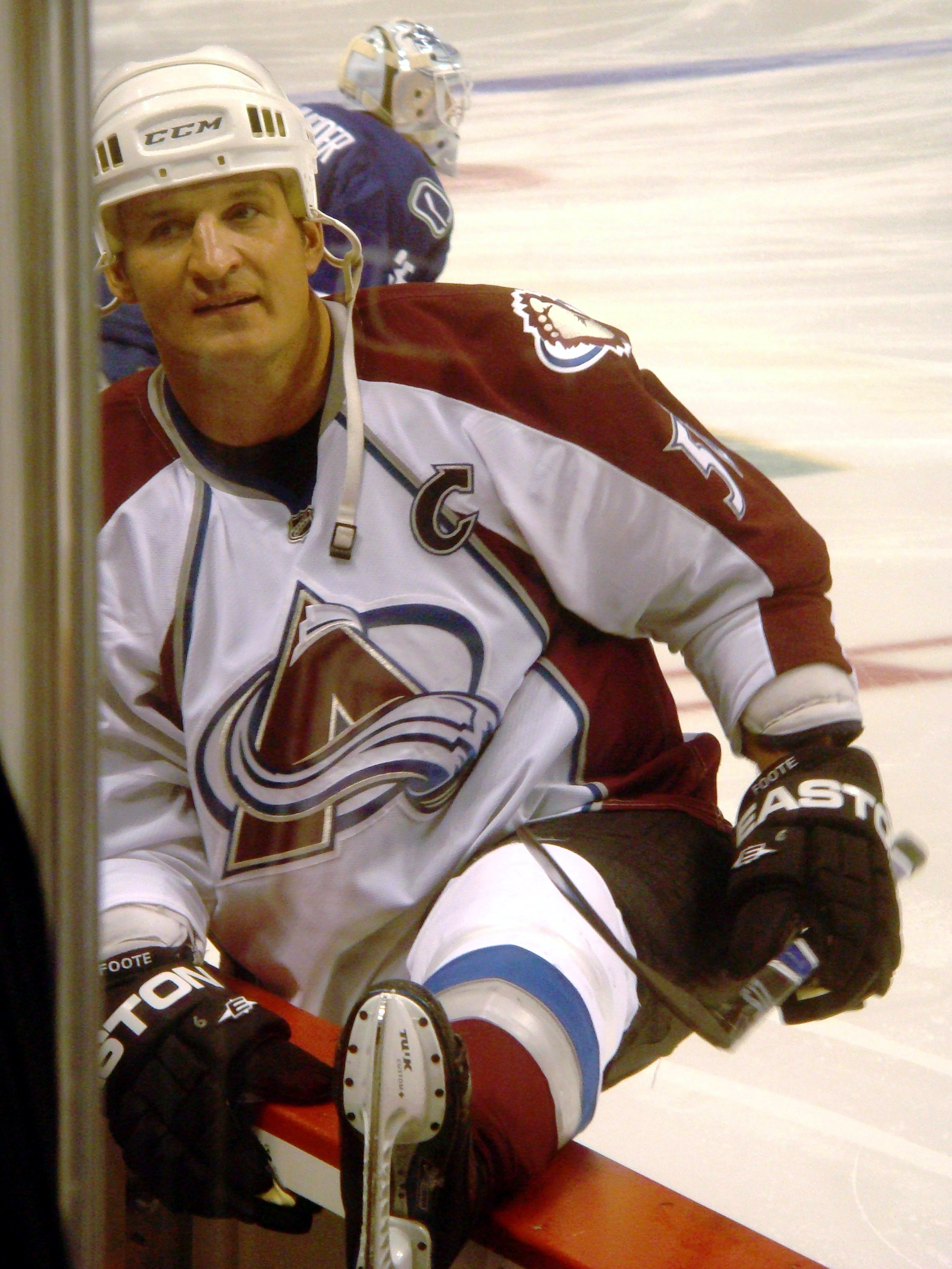
Adam Foote was the team captain for the Avalanche from 2009 to 2011.

Note: This list of team captains does not include captains from the Quebec Nordiques (WHA & NHL).

- Joe Sakic, 1995–2009
- Adam Foote, 2009–2011
- Milan Hejduk, 2011–2012
- Gabriel Landeskog, 2012–present

=== General managers ===
Note: This list does not include general managers from the Quebec Nordiques (WHA & NHL).

- Pierre Lacroix, 1995–2006
- François Giguère, 2006–2009
- Greg Sherman, 2009–2014
- Joe Sakic, 2014–2022
- Chris MacFarland, 2022–2026
- Joe Sakic, 2026–present

=== Head coaches ===
The current head coach is Jared Bednar, who was named on August 31, 2016.

== Honored members ==
=== Retired numbers ===
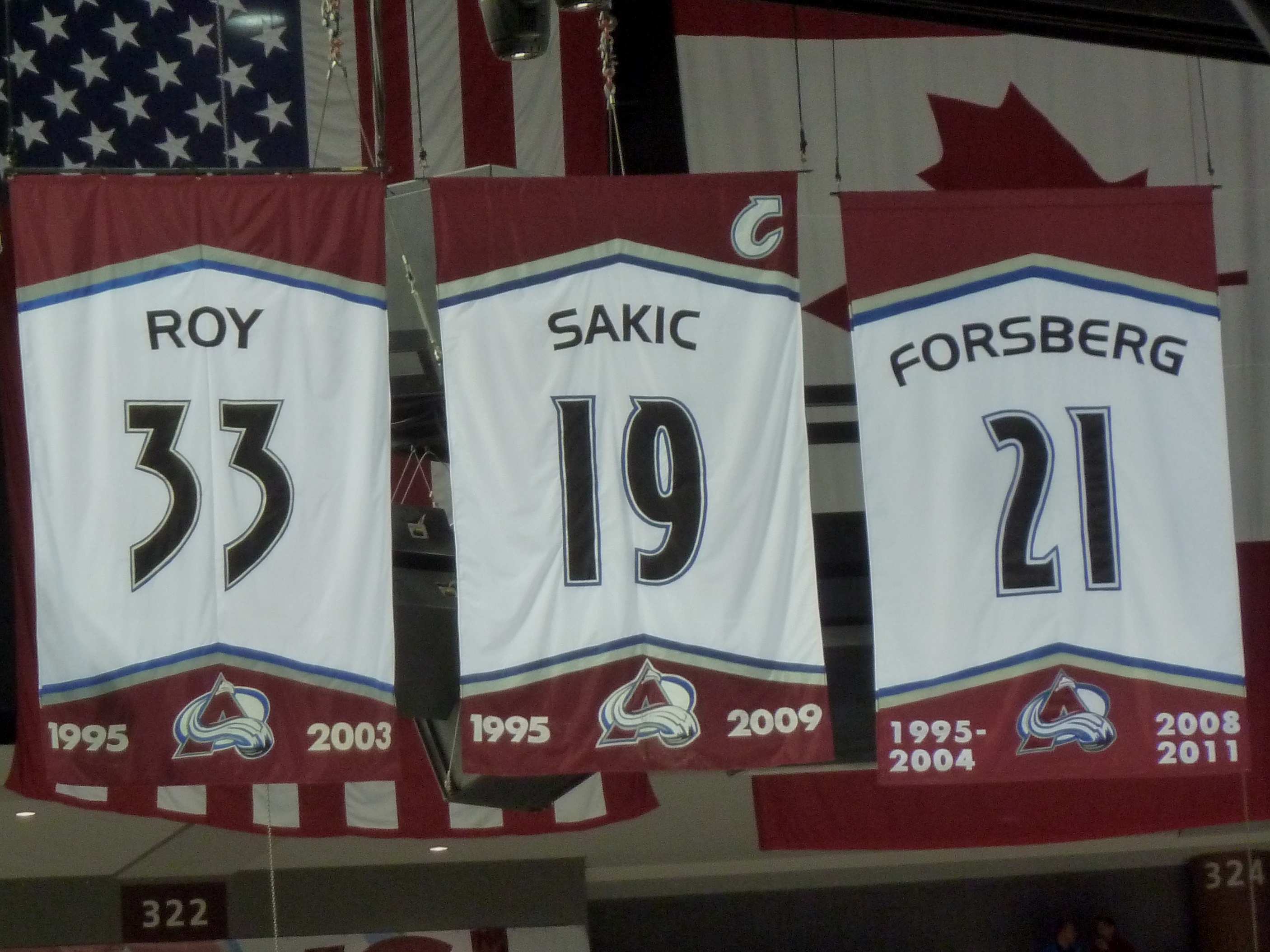
Three of the six banners for numbers retired by the Colorado Avalanche hanging at Ball Arena.

In addition to those below, the NHL retired Wayne Gretzky's No. 99 for all its member teams at the 2000 NHL All-Star Game.

Colorado Avalanche retired numbers
No.	Player	Position	Career	No. retirement
19	Joe Sakic ^{1}	C	1995–2009	October 1, 2009
21	Peter Forsberg	C	1995–2004; 2008, 2011	October 8, 2011
23	Milan Hejduk	RW	1998–2013	January 6, 2018
33	Patrick Roy	G	1995–2003	October 28, 2003
52	Adam Foote	D	1995–2004; 2008–2011	November 2, 2013
77	Ray Bourque	D	2000–2001	November 24, 2001

Notes:

- ^{1} The banner features the captain "C" to honor his eighteen years as team captain with both the Avalanche and predecessor Nordiques.

The numbers retired when the franchise was in Quebec – J. C. Tremblay's No. 3, Marc Tardif's No. 8, Michel Goulet's No. 16 and Peter Stastny's No. 26 – were entered back into circulation after the move to Colorado.

=== Hall of Famers ===
The Colorado Avalanche hold an affiliation with a number of inductees to the Hockey Hall of Fame. Eleven inductees from the players category of the Hall of Fame are affiliated with the Avalanche. Of those eleven, Forsberg, Roy, and Sakic earned their credentials primarily with the Avalanche.

Players

- Dave Andreychuk
- Rob Blake
- Ray Bourque
- Peter Forsberg
- Jarome Iginla
- Paul Kariya
- Jari Kurri
- Patrick Roy
- Joe Sakic
- Teemu Selänne
- Pierre Turgeon

Builders

- Pierre Lacroix

== Rivalries ==
=== Detroit Red Wings ===
In 1996, the Colorado Avalanche met the Detroit Red Wings in the conference finals and upset the Red Wings 4–2. During Game 6, Red Wings player Kris Draper was checked into the boards face-first by Avalanche player Claude Lemieux. As a result, Draper had to undergo facial reconstructive surgery and had to have his jaw wired shut for five weeks. The incident marked the beginning of a rivalry often considered one of the most intense in NHL history by the press and fans.

In the following season, in the last regular season meeting between the Avalanche and the Red Wings on March 26, 1997, a brawl known as the Brawl in Hockeytown broke out. The game ended with nine fights, 11 goals, 39 penalties, 148 penalty minutes, one hat-trick (by Valeri Kamensky) and a goaltender fight between Stanley Cup champion Patrick Roy and Mike Vernon. Claude Lemieux was one of the players singled out by the Red Wings players. The Red Wings ended up winning the game in overtime 6–5. The teams met again in the conference finals that season, with the Red Wings emerging victorious and going on to win the Stanley Cup.

The rivalry between the Avalanche and the Red Wings was at its peak from 1996 to 2002. During those seven seasons the two teams played five postseason series against each other in the Stanley Cup playoffs, with the Avalanche winning three of the series (1995–96, 4–2; 1998–99, 4–2; 1999–2000, 4–1) and the Red Wings winning two of them (1996–97, 4–2; 2001–02, 4–3). During this time frame, these two teams combined for a total of five Stanley Cup championships in seven years, the Avalanche winning twice (1995–96 and 2000–01) and the Red Wings winning three times (1996–97, 1997–98 and 2001–02). After 2002, the rivalry between the two teams began to cool down, and the two teams would not meet again in the playoffs until 2008, when the Red Wings swept the Avalanche in the conference semifinals and went on to win the Stanley Cup. The Red Wings moved to the Eastern Conference in 2013–14 season as part of the realignment which makes the two rivals only see each other twice a year.

== Franchise records and leaders ==
=== Franchise scoring leaders ===
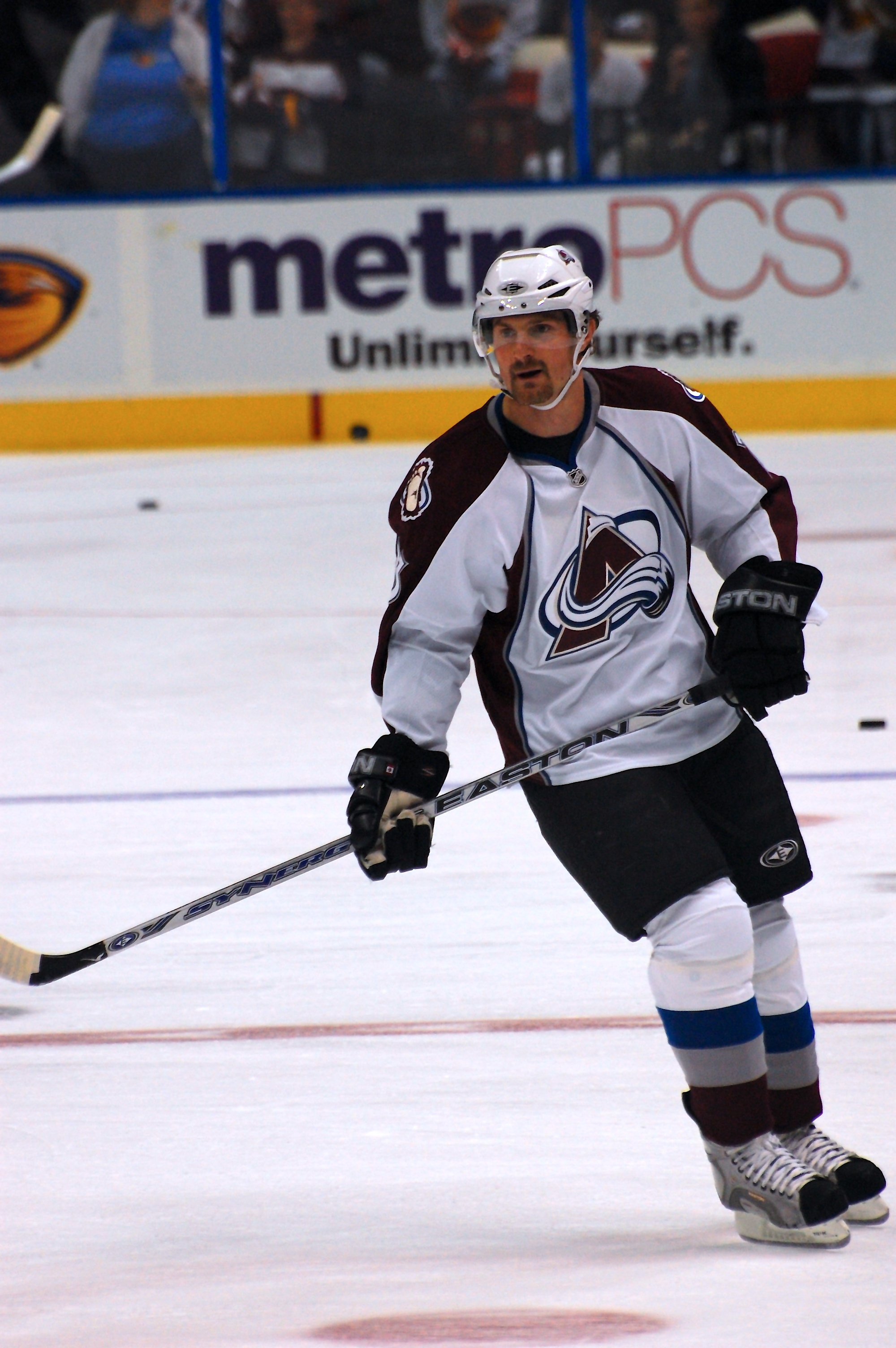
Scoring 805 points as an Avalanche, Milan Hejduk is the franchise's fifth-highest all-time points leader.

These are the top-ten-point-scorers in franchise (Quebec and Colorado) history. Figures are updated after each completed NHL regular season.

- * – current Avalanche player

Note: Pos = Position; GP = Games played; G = Goals; A = Assists; Pts = Points; P/G = Points per game

Points
Player	Pos	GP	G	A	Pts	P/G
Joe Sakic	C	1,378	625	1,016	1,641	1.19
Nathan MacKinnon*	C	950	420	722	1,142	1.20
Peter Šťastný	C	737	380	668	1,048	1.42
Michel Goulet	LW	813	456	490	946	1.16
Milan Hejduk	RW	1,020	375	430	805	.79
Peter Forsberg	C	591	217	538	755	1.28
Mikko Rantanen	RW	619	287	394	681	1.10
Anton Šťastný	LW	650	252	384	636	.98
Gabriel Landeskog*	LW	798	262	344	606	.76
Cale Makar*	D	470	136	371	507	1.08

Goals
Player	Pos	G
Joe Sakic	C	625
Michel Goulet	LW	456
Nathan MacKinnon*	C	420
Peter Šťastný	C	380
Milan Hejduk	RW	375
Mikko Rantanen	LW	287
Gabriel Landeskog*	LW	262
Anton Šťastný	LW	252
Peter Forsberg	C	217
Matt Duchene	C	178

Assists
Player	Pos	A
Joe Sakic	C	1,016
Nathan MacKinnon*	C	722
Peter Šťastný	C	668
Peter Forsberg	C	538
Michel Goulet	LW	490
Milan Hejduk	RW	430
Mikko Rantanen	RW	394
Anton Šťastný	LW	384
Cale Makar*	D	371
Gabriel Landeskog*	LW	344

=== Franchise goaltending leaders ===
These goaltenders rank in the top ten in franchise (Quebec and Colorado) history for wins. Figures are updated after each completed NHL season.

- * – current Avalanche player

Note: GP = Games played; W = Wins; L = Losses; T/O = Ties/Overtime losses; GA = Goal against; GAA = Goals against average; SA = Shots against; SV% = Save percentage; SO = Shutouts

Goaltenders
Player	GP	W	L	T/O	GA	GAA	SA	SV%	SO
Patrick Roy	478	262	140	65	1,070	2.27	12,994	.918	37
Semyon Varlamov	389	183	156	38	1,009	2.72	11,925	.915	21
Dan Bouchard	226	107	80	36	802	3.59	6,557	.878	5
Peter Budaj	242	101	91	27	627	2.83	6,363	.901	9
David Aebischer	174	89	58	14	391	2.35	4,605	.915	13
Alexandar Georgiev	143	86	41	11	392	2.84	4,095	.905	7
Stéphane Fiset	188	84	67	22	575	3.32	5,326	.892	6
Mario Gosselin	192	79	82	12	643	3.67	4,988	.871	6
Philipp Grubauer	113	66	30	10	256	2.38	3,131	.918	12
Clint Malarchuk	139	62	53	18	482	3.63	4,042	.901	5

=== Franchise records ===
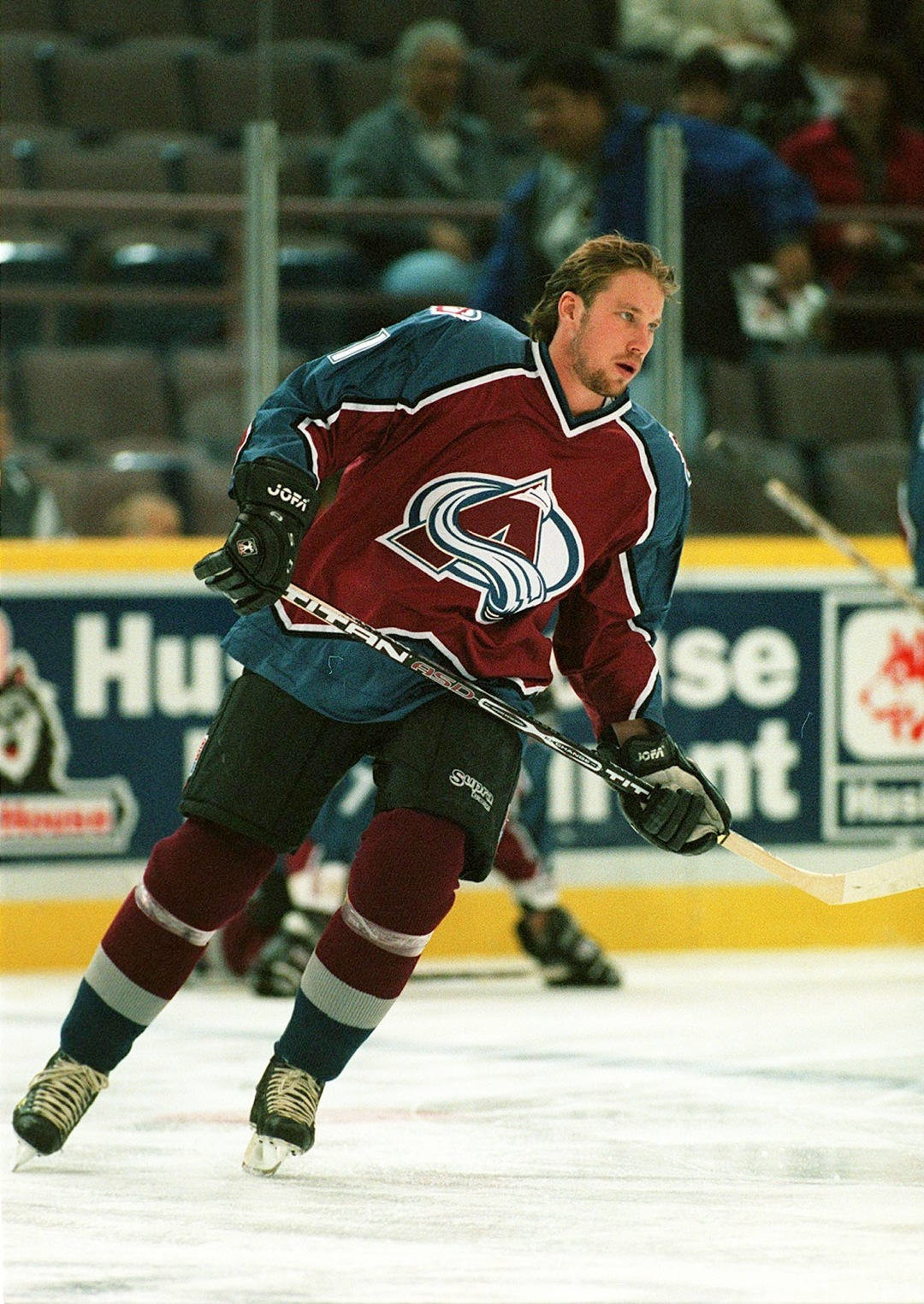
Recording 86 assists, Peter Forsberg held the Avalanche's franchise record for most assists in a single season until 2024.

Note: This list does not include records from the Quebec Nordiques. Items in bold are NHL records.

Records as of the 2024–25 season

==== Regular season ====
- Most goals in a season: Mikko Rantanen, 55 (2022–23)
- Most assists in a season: Nathan MacKinnon, 89 (2023–24)
- Most points in a season: Nathan MacKinnon, 140 (2023–24)
- Average points per game in a season: Nathan MacKinnon, 1.70 (2023–24)
- Most points in a season by defenseman: Cale Makar, 92 (2024–25)
- Most goals in a season by defenseman: Cale Makar, 30 (2024–25)
- Average points per game in a season by defenseman: Cale Makar, 1.16 (2023–24)
- Most penalty minutes in a season: Jeff Odgers, 259 (1998–99)
- Most game-winning goals in a season: Joe Sakic, 12 (2000–01)
- Most points in a season, rookie: Paul Stastny, 78 (2006–07)
- NHL record longest points streak, rookie: Paul Stastny, 20 games (2006–07)
- Best +/- record in a season: Nathan MacKinnon, +57 (2025–26)
- Most wins in a season: Semyon Varlamov, 41 (2013–14)
- Most shutouts in a season: Patrick Roy, 9 (2001–02)
- Best goals-against average in a season: Patrick Roy, 1.94 (2001–02)

==== Playoffs ====
- Most goals in a playoff season: Joe Sakic, 18 (1996)
- Most assists in a playoff season: Cale Makar, 21 (2022)
- Most points in a playoff season: Joe Sakic, 34 (1996)
- Most goals in a playoff season by defenseman: Cale Makar, 8 (2022)
- Most assists in a playoff season by defenseman: Cale Makar, 21 (2022)
- Most points in a playoff season by defenseman: Cale Makar, 29 (2022)
- Most penalty minutes in a playoff season: Adam Foote, 62 (1997)
- Most overtime game-winning goals in playoff career: Joe Sakic, 8
- Best +/- record in playoff career: Peter Forsberg, 54

==== Team ====
- Most consecutive division titles: 9 (1994–95 to 2002–03)
- Most points in a season: 121 (2025–26)
- Most wins in a season: 56 (2021–22)
- Most goals: 326 (1995–96)
- Largest margin of victory: 10 (12–2, December 5, 1995, vs San Jose)
- Longest consecutive attendance sellout: 487 (1995–2006)
- Most points without making Stanley Cup playoffs: 95 (2006–07)

== See also ==
- List of Colorado Avalanche draft picks
- Quebec Nordiques

Preceded by New Jersey Devils	Stanley Cup champions 1995–96	Succeeded by Detroit Red Wings
Preceded by New Jersey Devils	Stanley Cup champions 2000–01	Succeeded by Detroit Red Wings
Preceded by Tampa Bay Lightning	Stanley Cup champions 2021–22	Succeeded by Vegas Golden Knights
