= St. Croix River =

The St. Croix River is any of several rivers in North America:

- St. Croix River (Maine–New Brunswick), that forms part of the United States–Canada border
- St. Croix River (Wisconsin–Minnesota), United States, that forms part of the state border
- St. Croix River (Nova Scotia), Canada
