= Île-à-la-Crosse (disambiguation) =

Île-à-la-Crosse may refer to:

- Île-à-la-Crosse, northern village in Division No. 18, northwestern Saskatchewan, Canada
- Île-à-la-Crosse Airport, airport of Île-à-la-Crosse, Saskatchewan, Canada
- Île-à-la-Crosse 192E, Indian reserve of the English River First Nation in Saskatchewan, Canada
- Lac Île-à-la-Crosse, lake in North-Central Saskatchewan, Canada
