= Lacrosse Hall of Fame =

Lacrosse Hall of Fame may refer to:

- Canadian Lacrosse Hall of Fame
- National Lacrosse League Hall of Fame
- National Lacrosse Hall of Fame and Museum
- Professional Lacrosse Hall of Fame
