= St. Croix (clothing) =

Saint Croix, previously known as St. Croix and Knitwear, is an independently owned speciality boutique store selling handmade high-end knitwear founded and produced in Minnesota, USA.

== History ==
Founded by a group of seven designers 50 years ago, Saint Croix began as a small apparel business in Minnesota and has become a major retailer in luxury knitwear.

Saint Croix joined the advisory board for the Global Point of Sale and Store Operations Summit in Las Vegas in 2004, an event for successful retailers to discuss marketing strategies and modern trends and fashions.

== Operations ==
Saint Croix uses many rare raw materials including Australian Merino wWool, Pima cotton, Tasmanian lambswool, cashmere, vicuna and chenille.

Saint Croix employs more than 200 craftsmen who hand-craft the item and create limited quantities of each design.
