= Pierre Lacroix (ice hockey, born 1948) =

Canadian ice hockey manager (1948–2020)

- Hockey Hall of Fame, 2023 (Builder)
- Born: August 3, 1948 Montréal, Québec, Canada
- Died: December 13, 2020 (aged 72) Las Vegas, Nevada, U.S.
- NHL team: Quebec Nordiques; Colorado Avalanche

Pierre Lacroix (August 3, 1948 – December 13, 2020) was a Canadian ice hockey executive. He was the president and general manager of the Quebec Nordiques/Colorado Avalanche from 1994 to 2006. After the Nordiques moved to Colorado in 1995, he built teams that won the Stanley Cup twice, in 1996 and 2001. He was posthumously inducted into the Hockey Hall of Fame in 2023 as a builder.

== Executive and management career ==
Lacroix became president and general manager of the Quebec Nordiques in 1994, and followed the team to Denver a year later. He was known for his astute trades, such as his acquisition of Patrick Roy during the 1995–96 NHL season that led to a Cup that season and his trades for star defensemen Ray Bourque during the 1999–2000 NHL season and Rob Blake during the 2000–01 NHL season that also led to a Stanley Cup in 2001.

On March 8, 2006, a day before the NHL trade deadline, Pierre Lacroix traded goalie David Aebischer for 2002 Hart and Vezina trophy winner José Théodore. This trade was criticized in the local media at the time because Théodore was having a very bad season and was injured at the time of the trade. This criticism from media and fans continued at varying degrees throughout Théodore's short tenure with the Avalanche.

On May 12, 2006, Lacroix announced that he would be giving up his general manager duties and focusing solely on a new role as team president. On May 10, 2013, Lacroix announced that he was stepping down as president and would serve in an advisory role for the club.

On April 8, 2008, Lacroix was inducted into the Colorado Sports Hall of Fame for his contributions to the Colorado Avalanche organization.

== Team Performance as General Manager ==
Team	Year	Regular Season								Post Season			
Team	Year	G	W	L	T	OTL	Pts	P%	Finish	W	L	Win%	Result
QUE	1994-95	48	30	13	5	-	65	.677	1st in Northeast Division	2	4	.333	Lost 1st Round
Quebec Total		48	30	13	5	-	65	.677	---	2	4	.333	---
COL	1995-96	82	47	25	10	-	104	.634	1st in Pacific Division	16	6	.727	Stanley Cup Champions
COL	1996-97	82	49	24	9	-	107	.652	1st in Pacific Division	10	7	.588	Lost in WCF
COL	1997-98	82	39	26	17	-	95	.579	1st in Pacific Division	3	4	.429	Lost 1st Round
COL	1998-99	82	44	28	10	-	98	.598	1st in Northwest Division	11	8	.579	Lost in WCF
COL	1999-00	82	42	28	11	1	96	.585	1st in Northwest Division	11	6	.647	Lost in WCF
COL	2000-01	82	52	16	10	4	118	.720	President's Trophy Winners	16	7	.696	Stanley Cup Champions
COL	2001-02	82	45	28	8	1	99	.604	1st in Northwest Division	11	10	.524	Lost in WCF
COL	2002-03	82	42	19	13	8	105	.640	1st in Northwest Division	3	4	.429	Lost 1st Round
COL	2003-04	82	40	22	13	7	100	.610	2nd in Northwest Division	6	5	.545	Lost 2nd Round
COL	2005-06	82	43	30	-	9	95	.579	2nd in Northwest Division	4	5	.444	Lost 2nd Round
Colorado Total		868	473	259	106	30	-	.623	---	93	70	.571	---

== Personal life and death ==
Lacroix was the father of two sons, including former NHL player Eric Lacroix.

He died from complications of COVID-19 in Las Vegas on December 13, 2020, during the COVID-19 pandemic in Nevada.

== See also ==
- Notable families in the NHL

Preceded by Pierre Pagé (Quebec Nordiques)	General Manager of the Quebec Nordiques/Colorado Avalanche; 1994–2006	Succeeded by François Giguère
