= Stan Kroenke =

American businessman and sports team owner (born 1947)

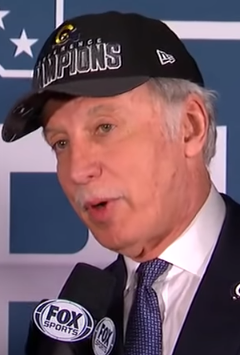
- Kroenke in 2019
- Born: Enos Stanley Kroenke; July 29, 1947 (age 79); Columbia, Missouri, U.S.
- Education: University of Missouri (BA, MBA)
- Occupations: Chairman and CEO of Kroenke Sports & Entertainment; Founder of the Kroenke Group; Chairman of THF Realty; Owner and co-chairman of English based Arsenal; Owner of English based Arsenal Women; CEO/Owner of the Los Angeles Rams; Owner of Denver Nuggets; Owner of Colorado Avalanche; Owner of Colorado Rapids; Owner of Colorado Mammoth; Owner of Screaming Eagle Winery and Vineyards; Owner of Waggoner Ranch
- Political party: Republican
- Spouse: Ann Walton Kroenke (m. 1974)
- Children: Josh; Whitney
- Awards: 2x Super Bowl champion; 2× Stanley Cup champion; 2023 NBA champion; 2010 MLS Cup champion; 2× NLL champion; 2026 Premier League champion

Enos Stanley Kroenke (/ˈkrɒŋki/; born July 29, 1947) is an American billionaire real estate magnate and sports team owner. Through his company Kroenke Sports & Entertainment, he owns Arsenal F.C. of the English Premier League, Arsenal W.F.C. of the English Women's Super League, the Los Angeles Rams of the NFL, the Denver Nuggets of the NBA, the Colorado Avalanche of the NHL, the Colorado Rapids of MLS, and the Colorado Mammoth of the National Lacrosse League.

The Nuggets and Avalanche franchises are held in the name of his wife, Ann Walton Kroenke, to evade NFL rules that forbid a team owner from having teams in other markets. Ann is the daughter of Walmart co-founder James "Bud" Walton.

Kroenke's holding company for sports teams has been controversial as in 2016, he moved the St. Louis Rams to Los Angeles, which later led to a lawsuit which incurred legal costs for the entire league. In 2021, Kroenke was involved in a failed effort to end the traditional European soccer system by creating a closed European Super League which would have included Arsenal and several other teams.

In the five major U.S. sports, Kroenke's teams have won multiple championships under his ownership (either partial or full), with the Rams winning one Super Bowl, the Avalanche winning the Stanley Cup twice, the Nuggets winning an NBA Championship, and the Rapids winning an MLS Cup. The Colorado Mammoth have also won two National Lacrosse League Championships while he was the owner. Kroenke has also found success in European football, as Arsenal won the Premier League in the 2025/2026 season and Arsenal W.F.C. won the UEFA Women's Champions League in the 2024/2025 season.

== Early life and education ==
Kroenke grew up in Mora, Missouri, an unincorporated community with a population of about two dozen, where his father owned Mora Lumber Company. His first job was sweeping the floor at his father's lumber yard. At Cole Camp (Missouri) High School, he played baseball, basketball and ran track.

== Business career ==
=== Real estate ===
Kroenke married Ann Walton, a Walmart heiress, in 1974. In 1983, he founded the Kroenke Group, a real estate development firm which has built shopping centers and apartment buildings and has developed many of his plazas near Walmart stores.

Kroenke is also the chairman of THF Realty, a real estate development company specializing in suburban development. He founded it in St. Louis, Missouri, in 1991. In 2016, THF's portfolio was valued at more than $2 billion, including more than 100 projects totaling 20 million square feet, primarily in retail shopping centers.

Kroenke was already wealthy in his own right, but became even more so when Ann inherited a major stake in Walmart upon the death of her father, Walmart cofounder Bud Walton, in 1995.

Kroenke is a major owner of working ranches, owning a total of 848,631 acres (343,429 ha) in 2015 when The Land Report magazine ranked him as the United States' ninth-largest landowner. In 2016, he acquired the Waggoner Ranch in Texas, the largest ranch within one fenceline. As of 2026, Kroenke is the largest private landowner in the U.S., owning over 2.7 million acres across the American West and Canada.

=== Other ventures ===
In 2006, Kroenke in partnership with the money manager Charles Banks, acquired Screaming Eagle, a winery in Napa Valley. In 2009, Banks said he was no longer involved with Screaming Eagle.

In 2017, Kroenke came under fire for launching a British outdoor sports television channel that shows hunting programs that include killing elephants, lions, and other vulnerable African species.

== Professional sports ownership ==
=== Kroenke Sports and Entertainment ===
Founded in 1999, Kroenke Sports & Entertainment owns Ball Arena in Denver, home of the Nuggets, Avalanche, and Mammoth, and co-owns Dick's Sporting Goods Park in Commerce City, home of the Rapids. Both venues were built by his development company. In 2004, Kroenke launched a competitor to FSN Rocky Mountain (now known as AT&T SportsNet Rocky Mountain), Altitude, a regional sports network that became the official broadcaster for both of Kroenke's teams on launch. Kroenke also established TicketHorse, a ticket company that provides in-house sales for all his teams.

=== Denver Nuggets and Colorado Avalanche ===
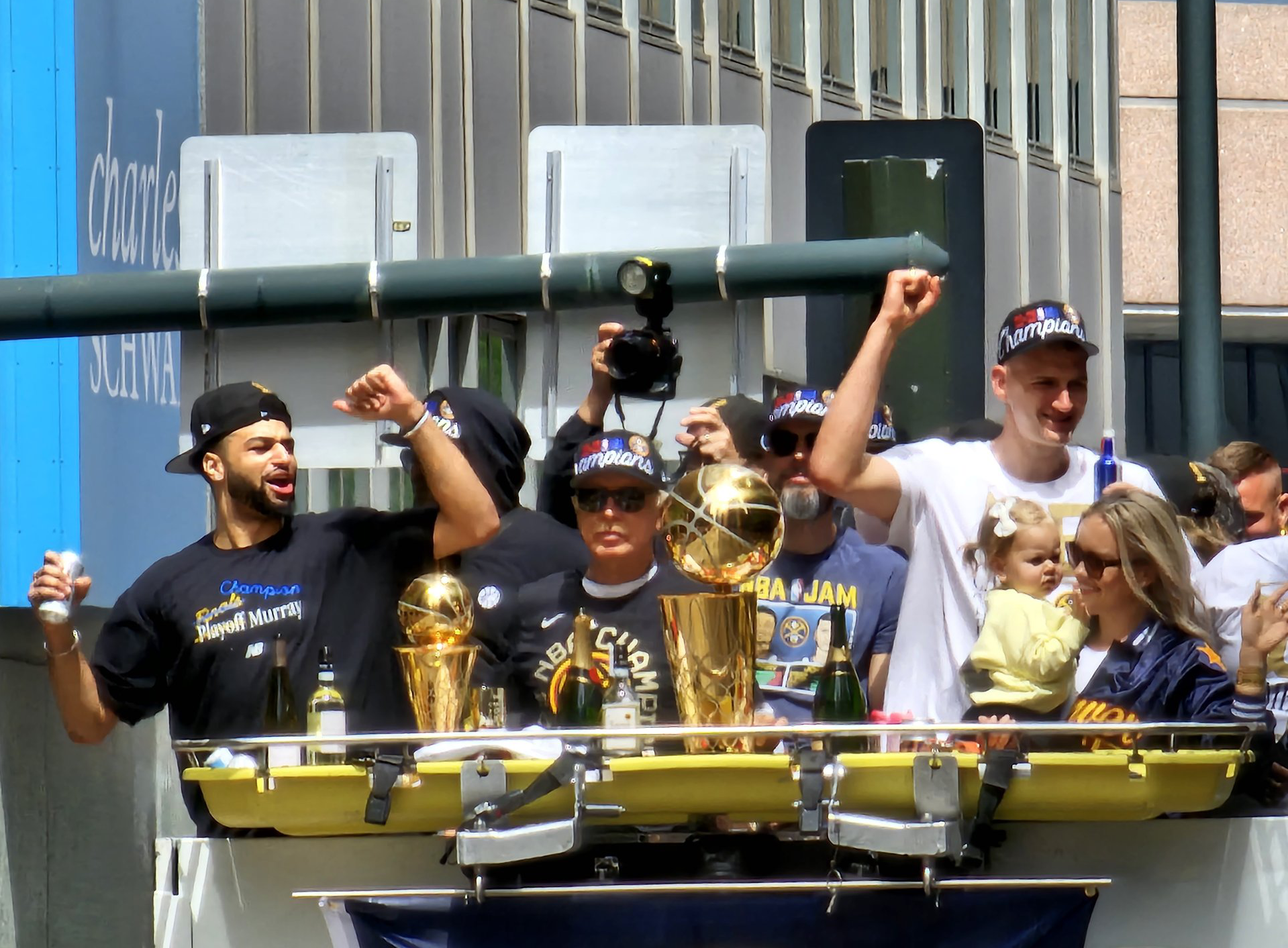
Kroenke (center) at the Nuggets championship parade

In 2000, Kroenke became full owner of both the National Basketball Association's Denver Nuggets and the National Hockey League's Colorado Avalanche, purchasing the teams from Charlie Lyons's Ascent Entertainment Group.

=== Colorado Crush ===
In 2002, Kroenke partnered with Denver Broncos owner Pat Bowlen and former Bronco quarterback John Elway to become part owner of the Arena Football League's Colorado Crush.

=== Colorado Mammoth and Colorado Rapids ===
In 2004, Kroenke purchased the National Lacrosse League's Colorado Mammoth and Major League Soccer's Colorado Rapids from Phil Anschutz.

=== St. Louis Rams ===
On April 13, 1995, Kroenke helped Georgia Frontiere move the National Football League's Los Angeles Rams from Anaheim to St. Louis by purchasing a 30% share of the team.

In 2010, two years after Frontiere's death, Kroenke exercised his right of first refusal to purchase the remaining interest in the Rams from her estate. On August 25, 2010, he became full owner of the Rams by unanimous consent of the NFL. To gain approval from NFL owners, Kroenke agreed to turn over control of the Denver Nuggets and Colorado Avalanche to his son, Josh, by the end of 2010, and to give up his majority stake in both teams in December 2014. The NFL does not allow its owners to hold majority control of major-league teams in other NFL markets. On October 7, 2015, the NFL approved transfer of his ownership stake of the Avalanche and Nuggets to his wife, Ann Walton Kroenke.

==== Stadium lease issues ====
In April 2010, as Kroenke was trying to gain full ownership of the team, and while knowing of an escape clause in the Rams' lease at the Edward Jones Dome, he said, "I'm going to attempt to do everything that I can to keep the Rams in St. Louis."

In February 2013, the Rams and the City of St. Louis went to arbitration over a clause in the Rams' lease stating their stadium must be among the NFL's best. The arbitrators agreed with the Rams, enabling the team to break their original lease and assume a year-to-year lease agreement.

In 2015, Kroenke said he was willing to work with Missouri officials and give them a "complete understanding" of the stadium situation. On November 30, 2015, he met with Missouri Governor Jay Nixon at Rams Park in Earth City, Missouri.

=== Los Angeles Rams ===
==== Move to Los Angeles ====
On January 5, 2015, the Kroenke Group announced it would team with Stockbridge Capital Group to build a 70,000-seat NFL stadium and venue in Inglewood, California. To persuade Kroenke to keep the Rams in St. Louis, the city offered to build an open-air stadium, later named National Car Rental Field, in the north riverfront area of downtown.

In his pitch to fellow NFL owners, Kroenke said St. Louis was no longer a viable market for the Rams or the NFL. NFL commissioner Roger Goodell said the St. Louis funding did not meet the NFL's criteria. St. Louis officials countered Kroenke was misrepresenting the city where St. Louis was being misrepresented at the owners' meetings.

The Oakland Raiders and San Diego Chargers had complained about the aging amenities of their stadiums (Oakland Coliseum in Oakland and Qualcomm Stadium in San Diego, respectively), and had proposed a stadium in Carson, California in competition with Kroenke's Inglewood proposal.

On January 4, 2016, all three teams applied to move to Los Angeles for the 2016 NFL season. The next day, the Rams and Kroenke released their proposal for the move. Some of the Rams' conclusions were disputed by Mayor of St. Louis Francis Slay (in a letter to Goodell), the St. Louis Regional Chamber, and Forbes. Others said the city would be better off not paying for a new stadium.

On January 12, the NFL, after discussions led by Dallas Cowboys owner Jerry Jones, approved the Rams' application to move from St. Louis back to Los Angeles by a 30–2 vote; the Chargers would have a one-year option to join them. In 2017, the Chargers announced they would move to Los Angeles for the 2017 season, with the intention to first play in Carson then move into Kroenke's Inglewood Stadium, pending completion. The Raiders subsequently announced a move to Las Vegas, Nevada.

On April 12, 2017, it was reported the City of St. Louis, St. Louis County, and the Regional Convention and Sports Complex Authority had sued the NFL and all 32 NFL clubs (including Kroenke) and sought damages and restitution of profits. On July 12, 2017, the Rams filed motions seeking to dismiss the case for failure to state a claim, dismiss the case for lack of personal jurisdiction, and appeal to have the case determined through arbitration rather than in front of a St. Louis-based jury. The motions in the case were decided by Judge Christopher McGraugh. On April 20, 2020, the Supreme Court denied Kroenke's and the NFL's appeal of the lawsuit. On November 24, 2021, it was announced the NFL, Kroenke, and the various St. Louis parties had agreed to a $790 million settlement to end the lawsuit before it would have gone to trial in 2022. Some legal experts believe the lawsuit was not dismissed because Kroenke lied about his true intentions with the Rams, the NFL did not follow its own relocation guidelines created after the league failed to stop the Raiders' move to Los Angeles in the early 80s, and Kroenke/the league allowed St. Louis to spend money planning a replacement stadium when they had no intention of making a deal to lease it.

=== Arsenal ===
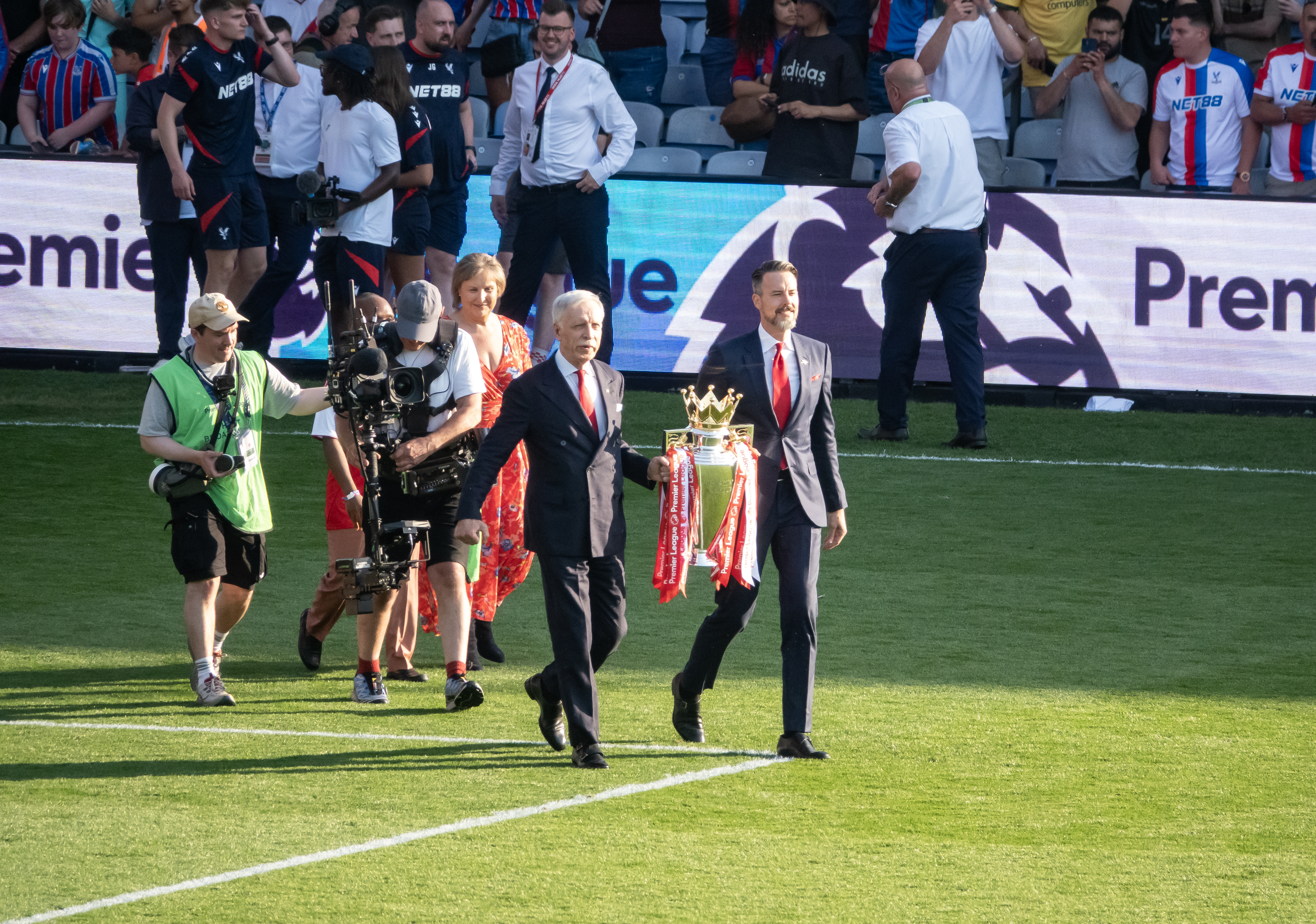
Stan and Josh Kroenke carrying the Premier League trophy on the final day of the 2025/26 season

Kroenke owns Arsenal Holdings, which owns football clubs Arsenal of the English Premier League and Arsenal Women of the English WSL. Arsenal already had a connection to Kroenke's Colorado Rapids when, in 2007, Granada Ventures, a subsidiary of ITV, sold its 9.9% stake in Arsenal Holdings to Kroenke's KSE UK. Kroenke bought more shares in the club, taking his total stake up to 12.19%. The club's board initially expressed skepticism a bid would be in its best interests, but gradually warmed to him as part of counteracting Alisher Usmanov's rival bid.

By June 2008, the board had prepared to let Kroenke take over, and on September 19, 2008, it was officially announced Kroenke had joined the board of directors. Kroenke had a beneficial interest in, and controlled voting rights, over 18,594 shares, representing 29.9% of the issued shares. At the 29.99% threshold, an offer for all remaining shares must be made.

On April 10, 2011, it was reported Kroenke was in advanced talks to complete the takeover. The next day, it was announced he had increased his stake to 62.89% by purchasing the stakes of Danny Fiszman and Lady Nina Bracewell-Smith, and agreed to make an offer for the rest of the club at £11,750 per share, valuing the club at £731M.

In August 2018, Kroenke made an offer which was accepted of around £600M, valuing the total shareholding at £1.8 billion, to Alisher Usmanov, to bring his ownership of shares beyond 90% and forcing the purchase of the remaining shares.

In April 2021, Arsenal was announced as a founding member of the European Super League, which would have effectively ended the pyramid system of European soccer and placed Arsenal in a closed league without prospects for meritocratic relegation and promotion. Arsenal and the five other English clubs involved backed out within two days after a strong backlash. After the aborted attempt to end the European soccer system, Arsenal fans protested and called for the Kroenke family to sell the club. The Kroenke family released a statement saying they would not do so.

In 2026, Arsenal were the champion of the English Premier League, their first title in 22 years.

=== Los Angeles Gladiators ===
In 2017, Kroenke Sports and Entertainment developed a new e-sports team franchise, the Los Angeles Gladiators, in the newly founded Overwatch League; their inaugural season began on December 6. The team folded in October of 2023 after the Overwatch League dissolved.

=== Los Angeles Guerrillas ===
In 2019, Kroenke Sports and Entertainment developed its second e-sports team, the Los Angeles Guerrillas of the Call of Duty League. They, along with the Los Angeles Gladiators of the Overwatch League, are based in Hollywood Park, next door to where the Rams play. The team was sold to Gentle Mates out of France in December of 2024.

=== Acquisition of the Los Angeles Angels ===
On September 1, 2026, it was reported Kroenke Sports & Entertainment entered a formal agreement to buy the Los Angeles Angels, with Stan Kroenke and his ownership group set to become the controlling owners of the team. The deal is set to close in the first quarter of 2027, per MLB's approval. The four billion dollar acquisition of the Los Angeles Angels is the most costly purchase of a baseball team to date.

== Awards and honors ==
=== NFL ===
- Two-time Super Bowl champion (XXXIV in 2000 as co-owner of the Rams in St. Louis and LVI in 2022 as full owner and chairman of the Rams in Los Angeles)

=== NHL ===
- Two-time Stanley Cup champion in 2000-01 and 2021-22 (as owner of the Avalanche)

=== NBA ===
- 2023 NBA champion (as owner of the Denver Nuggets)

=== MLS ===
- 2010 MLS Cup champion (as owner of the Colorado Rapids)

=== Lacrosse ===
- Two-time National Lacrosse League champion in 2006 and 2022 (as owner of the Colorado Mammoth)

=== Arena Football ===
- ArenaBowl XIX Champion in 2005 (as co-owner of the Colorado Crush)

=== Premier League ===
- 2025–26 Premier League Champion (as owner of Arsenal)
- 2024-2025 Women's Champions League with Arsenal Women

== Personal life ==
On a ski trip to Aspen, Colorado, Kroenke met his wife, Ann Walton, daughter of Bud Walton, who co-founded Walmart with his brother Sam. As an heiress to the Walmart fortune, Ann is worth $9.1 billion as of 2023. They married in 1974.

Kroenke is of German descent and was raised Lutheran. He is popularly known as "Silent Stan" because he rarely gives interviews.

Kroenke, a Republican, donated at least $300,000 to Republican campaigns between 2000 and 2013, and donated $1 million to Donald Trump's inauguration fund in 2017. During the 2016 U.S. presidential campaign, Kroenke donated $100,000 to the Hillary Victory Fund, possibly related to concerns around Walmart's labor practices circulating as a campaign issue.. He subsequently donated $1 million to Donald Trump's inaugural committee.

Sporting positions
Preceded by AT&T Liberty Media	Denver Nuggets principal owner 2000–present	Incumbent
Preceded by Ascent Entertainment Group	Colorado Avalanche principal owner 2000–present	Incumbent
Preceded by Chip Rosenbloom	St. Louis/Los Angeles Rams principal owner 2010–present	Incumbent
