= Denver Nuggets =

National Basketball Association team in Denver, Colorado

- 2026–27 Denver Nuggets season
- Conference: Western
- Division: Northwest
- Founded: 1967
- History: Denver Rockets; 1967–1974 (ABA); Denver Nuggets; 1974–1976 (ABA); 1976–present (NBA)
- Arena: Ball Arena
- Location: Denver, Colorado
- Team colors: Midnight blue, sunshine yellow, Flatirons red, skyline blue
- Main sponsor: Ibotta
- CEO: Josh Kroenke
- President: Josh Kroenke
- General manager: Ben Tenzer
- Head coach: David Adelman
- Ownership: Kroenke Sports & Entertainment (Stan Kroenke, Owner/Governor)
- Affiliation: Grand Rapids Gold
- Championships: 1 (2023)
- Conference titles: 1 (2023)
- Division titles: 12; ABA: 2 (1970, 1975); NBA: 10 (1977, 1978, 1985, 1988, 2006, 2009, 2010, 2019, 2020, 2023)
- Retired numbers: 7 (2, 12, 33, 40, 44, 55, 432)
- Website: nba.com/nuggets
Association	Icon	Statement

The Denver Nuggets are an American professional basketball team based in Denver. The Nuggets compete in the National Basketball Association (NBA) as a member of the Northwest Division of the Western Conference. The team was originally founded as the Denver Larks in 1967 as a charter franchise of the American Basketball Association (ABA), but changed their name to the Rockets before the first season began due to a swift ownership change that came from the owners of the local Ringsby Rocket Truck Lines company. The Rockets then changed their name to the Nuggets on August 7, 1974, as a precautionary measure for their franchise to move from the ABA to the NBA. After the name change, the Nuggets played for the final ABA Championship title in 1976, losing to the New York Nets.

The team has had some periods of success, qualifying for the ABA playoffs in all but two seasons of the ABA's existence. The team made the 1976 ABA Finals, losing to the New York Nets. The team joined the NBA in 1976 after the ABA–NBA merger and qualified for the NBA playoffs in nine consecutive seasons in the 1980s and ten consecutive seasons from 2004 to 2013. In 2023, the Nuggets, led by Nikola Jokić and Jamal Murray, reached their first NBA Finals and defeated the Miami Heat to capture the franchise's first NBA championship. The Nuggets were the last of the four surviving former ABA teams to reach the NBA Finals, and the second former ABA team to win an NBA title (after the San Antonio Spurs). The Nuggets play their home games at Ball Arena, which they share with the Colorado Avalanche of the National Hockey League (NHL) and the Colorado Mammoth of the National Lacrosse League (NLL).

== History ==
=== 1967: Franchise founding ===
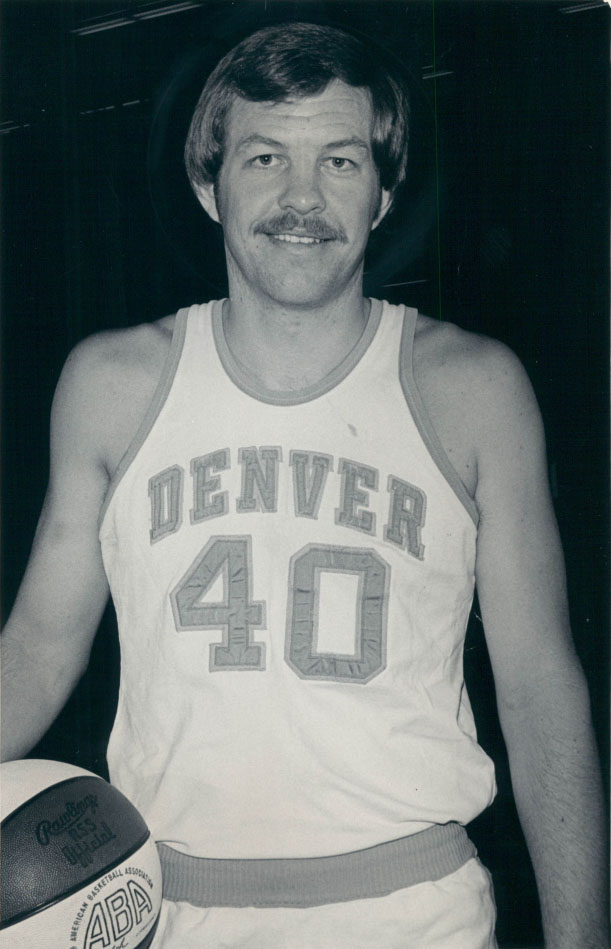
Byron Beck, a University of Denver alumnus, is shown wearing the "Denver Rockets" uniform

The current franchise traces its roots to 1967, when one of the American Basketball Association (ABA)'s charter franchises was awarded to a group in Kansas City, Missouri, headed by Southern California businessman James Trindle. However, Trindle was unable to find a suitable arena within the Kansas City area. League commissioner George Mikan suggested moving the team to Denver instead. After agreeing to name Denver resident and former NBA player Vince Boryla as the general manager, Trindle moved his Kansas City team to Denver as the newly named Denver Larks franchise, named after Colorado's state bird. However, the Trindle group was found out to be severely undercapitalized, leading Mikan to order the Larks franchise to post a $100,000 performance bond or lose the franchise before they even played a single game. Hours before the deadline happened, Trindle sold a two-thirds controlling interest to Denver trucking magnate Bill Ringsby and his son for $350,000. Ringsby then immediately renamed the team the Rockets, after his local company's long-haul trucks called the "Ringsby Rocket Truck Lines".

=== 1967–1976: ABA years ===
Playing at the Denver Auditorium Arena, the Rockets had early successes on the court, developing a strong fan base along the way. However, the team had a history of early playoff exits and only once played in the ABA championship series.

Early on, Denver had a solid lineup led by Byron Beck and Larry Jones, then later by Beck and Ralph Simpson. Lonnie Wright of the American Football League's Denver Broncos signed with the Rockets during that first season and became the first player to play professional football and basketball in the same season. Wright played four seasons with Denver. Controversial rookie Spencer Haywood joined the team for the 1969–70 season. Haywood was one of the first players to turn professional before graduating from college, and the NBA initially refused to let him play in the league due to his status at the time. Haywood averaged nearly 30 points and 19.5 rebounds per game in his only ABA season, being named ABA MVP, ABA rookie of the year, as well as the All-Star Game MVP. The team finished 51–33, winning their division, before exiting the playoffs in the 2nd round.

Just before the start of the 1970–71 season, Haywood signed with the Seattle SuperSonics, jumping to the NBA and later resulting in the Haywood v. National Basketball Association case that allowed for both NBA and ABA teams to draft collegiate underclassmen (and later, high school players) going forward. The team tumbled to a 30–54 record and attendance suffered.

==== 1974–1976: Becoming the Nuggets ====
Ringsby later sold the team to San Diego businessmen Frank Goldberg and Bud Fischer in 1972 following more recent troubles with his trucking operations at the time. A year prior to the change in management, the Rockets changed their team logo from a logo reflecting the team's partnership with Ringsby's Rocket Truck Lines (whose logo was similar looking to the one the team was using at the time) to one that gave the team more of an identity beyond branding purposes with Ringsby's business. In 1974, in anticipation of moving into the NBA, and the new McNichols Arena, the franchise held a contest to choose a new team nickname, as "Rockets" was already in use by the Houston Rockets. The winning choice was "Nuggets", in honor of the original Denver Nuggets NBL team from 1948 to 1950, the last year as a charter member of the NBA following the BAA merging operations with the NBL to create the modern-day NBA. Their new logo was a miner "discovering" an ABA ball. The change from Rockets to Nuggets was ultimately made official on August 7, 1974, months before the franchise began the 1974–75 ABA season. Goldberg and Fischer in turn sold the team to a local investment group called Nuggets Management Inc. in 1974 and 1975 in relation to the upcoming move from the ABA to the NBA.

With the drafting and signing of future Hall of Fame player David Thompson out of North Carolina State and Marvin Webster, and the acquisitions of Dan Issel and Bobby Jones (all signed for the 1975–76 season), with Larry Brown coaching, they had their best seasons in team history in their first two as the Nuggets. Playing in the Denver Auditorium Arena for the last season the 1974–75 team went 65–19, including a 40–2 record at home. However, they lost in the Western Conference Finals in 7 games, to the Indiana Pacers.

In 1975–76, playing at their new arena, the Nuggets, with the acquisitions of Thompson, Jones and Dan Issel who had come via a trade after he won an ABA title with the 1974–75 Kentucky Colonels, the team went 60–24, edged the reigning champion Kentucky Colonels four games to three to make the 1976 ABA finals for the first time. Eventually, they lost to the New York Nets and Julius Erving in 6 games. They did not get a second chance to win an ABA league championship, as the ABA–NBA merger took place after the 1975–76 season. The Nuggets, Nets, Indiana Pacers, and San Antonio Spurs were merged into the NBA. The Spirits of St. Louis and Kentucky Colonels were disbanded, with the Virginia Squires not even making it to the merger period.

=== 1976–1982: Early NBA years ===
The Nuggets and Nets had actually applied to join the NBA in 1975, but were forced to stay in the ABA by a court order. The Nuggets continued their strong play early on in the NBA, as they won division titles in their first two seasons in the league, and missed a third by a single game. However, neither of these teams were ultimately successful in the postseason. Similarly to the other new NBA teams, the Nuggets were saddled with stiff financial obligations upon joining the NBA, including a $2 million entry fee. Red McCombs bought the team in 1978.

In 1979, Brown left the team, helping usher in a brief decline in their performance. It ended in 1981, when they hired Doug Moe as a head coach. Moe brought with him a "motion offense" philosophy, a style of play focusing on attempting to move the ball until someone got open. Moe was also known for not paying as much attention to defense as other NBA coaches. The offense helped the team become highly competitive. During the 1980s, the Nuggets often scored in excess of 115 points a game, and during the 1981–82 season, they scored at least 100 points in every game. The NBA-record streak was halted at 136 consecutive games. During the 1981–82 season, the Nuggets set the league scoring record for the highest points per game average at 126.5 points.

=== 1982–1989: The "Enver Nuggets" ===
Anchored by the frontcourt of Alex English and Kiki Vandeweghe, who averaged above 25 points per game, alongside center Dan Issel, Denver led the entire league in scoring, topped the Midwest Division and qualify for the playoffs during that span. However, Doug Moe's strategy had taken its toll, leading to widespread ridicule climaxing in the "Enver Nuggets" nickname (without the "D" in defense). On December 13, 1983, the Nuggets and the visiting Detroit Pistons combined for an NBA record 370 points, with Detroit winning in triple overtime 186–184. At the end of the season, English became the only Nugget so far to win an NBA scoring title. In 1984–85, Denver made it to the Western Conference finals after being perennial playoff contenders, and they lost in five games to the Los Angeles Lakers.

Vandeweghe was traded before the 1984–85 season to the Portland Trail Blazers for rebounding guard Fat Lever, power forward Calvin Natt and center Wayne Cooper. Spearheaded by English and supported by the three new acquisitions and defensive specialists Bill Hanzlik and T. R. Dunn, the Nuggets replicated its success in the Western Conference despite this loss, and even managed to win a record 54 games in the 1987–88 season. However, the Mavericks eliminated them in the second round of the playoffs. Sidney Shlenker acquired the team in 1985 only to sell them to COMSAT in 1989.

In October 1989, prior to the start of the 1989–90 regular season, the Nuggets won the McDonald's Open after a 135–129 victory over European champion Jugoplastika in the championship game. Walter Davis was named the tournament's MVP.

=== 1989–1991: Decline under Paul Westhead ===
Replacing Moe in 1990, Paul Westhead continued to push the "run and gun" style of play on Denver, allowing players to speed down the court to shoot rather than creating set plays. Combined with the 1980s core slowly being depleted due to age and injuries, the Nuggets fell apart, going from a playoff-contending 44–38 record in 1988–89 to last place in the West at 20–62 in the 1990-91 season.

=== 1991–1996: The Dikembe Mutombo era ===
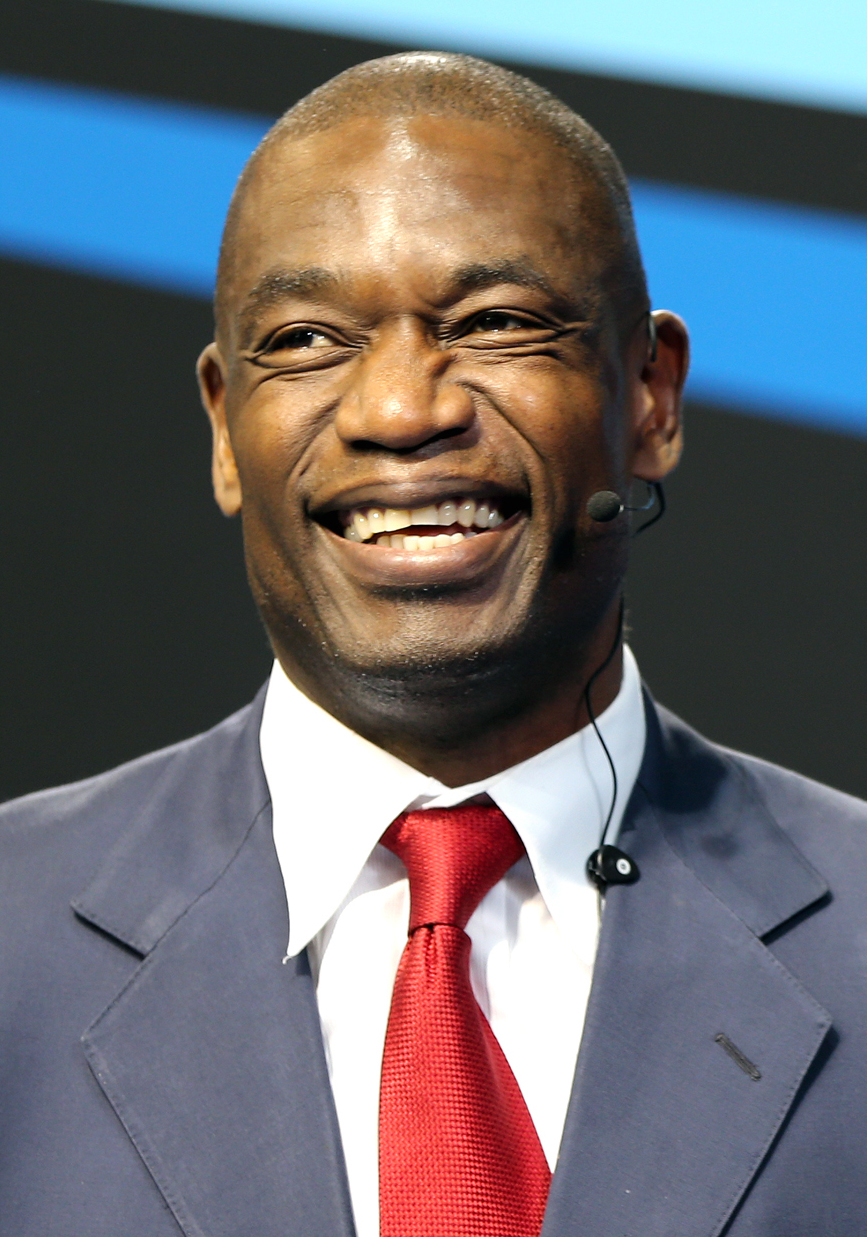
Dikembe Mutombo, nicknamed "Mount Mutombo" for his exceptional rim protecting and shot blocking ability, was drafted by the Nuggets in 1991 and won Defensive Player of the Year with the Nuggets in 1995.

Denver took a positive step in rebuilding by drafting Georgetown University center Dikembe Mutombo in 1991. Mutombo finished runner-up to Larry Johnson for the NBA rookie of the year that season. Denver finished 24–58 that year.

Denver fired Westhead prior to the 1992–93 season and hired former star player Dan Issel as his successor. The Nuggets had two lottery picks that year and drafted University of Notre Dame forward LaPhonso Ellis and University of Virginia guard Bryant Stith. Denver improved to 36–46, just missing the playoffs that year.

Denver ditched their rainbow colors for a dark navy, metallic gold and wine color scheme starting in the 1993–94 season. Led by Mutombo, Mahmoud Abdul-Rauf (who changed his name from Chris Jackson prior to the season), and Ellis, Denver finished with its first winning season since the Doug Moe era at 42–40. Denver clinched the eighth seed in the Western Conference playoffs, playing the first place Seattle SuperSonics. Denver was a heavy underdog, having only a couple of players on their roster with actual NBA playoff experience. After dropping the first two games of the five-game set in Seattle, the series returned to Denver. Denver won both games and tied the series at 2. The Nuggets made NBA history in game five, upsetting Seattle in overtime 98–94. They became the first 8th-seeded team to defeat a 1st-seeded team in NBA playoff history. Denver almost repeated the feat before falling to the Utah Jazz in game seven of the second round.

Denver acquired Sonics sharp-shooter Dale Ellis in the off-season and drafted University of Michigan guard Jalen Rose. Denver struggled, causing Issel to resign as coach partway into the season. Assistant Coach Gene Littles assumed control for a brief period before relinquishing control to general manager Bernie Bickerstaff. Denver rebounded and earned the eighth seed again in the playoffs, finishing 41–41. The Nuggets were swept by the San Antonio Spurs in the first round of the playoffs that season.

Following that season, Denver acquired Antonio McDyess in a draft-day trade with the Los Angeles Clippers. McDyess was the face of the franchise for the next few years, as Mutombo left after the 1995–96 season for the Atlanta Hawks, Ellis missed the majority of the next few seasons due to recurring knee and leg injuries, Rose was traded to the Indiana Pacers for Mark Jackson, and Abdul-Rauf was traded to the Sacramento Kings prior to the 1996–97 season.

=== 1996–2003: Another period of struggle ===
After finishing the 1996–97 season with the fourth-worst record in the league (21–61), the Nuggets sent Antonio McDyess to the Phoenix Suns, and Dale Ellis returned to Seattle. Denver flirted with history in the 1997–98, by nearly setting the mark for fewest wins in an 82-game season (11). They tied the then-NBA's all-time worst single-season losing streak at 23—only one game shy of the overall worst mark of 24 by the Cleveland Cavaliers of the early 1980s. The losing streak was later broken by the Cavaliers in 2011 and the Philadelphia 76ers in 2014 with 26 consecutive losses. While the Nuggets would slowly rebuild towards semi-competitiveness, they remained out of the playoffs, with the best record of this time still a game below .500, a 40-42 finish in 2000-2001. However, it would serve merely a brief respite before struggling further, hitting a nadir at the start of the following season when then-coach Dan Issel was forced to resign after making an inflammatory comment towards a heckling fan. It all culminated in the Nuggets tying for the worst record in the NBA in 2002–03 with a ghastly 17-65 record, also with the Cavaliers.

==== Ownership instability ====
The team's struggles in the late 1990s were due in part to ownership instability. COMSAT bought the NHL's Quebec Nordiques in 1995 and moved them to Denver as the Colorado Avalanche. However, its diversification into sports ownership was proving a drain on the company. In particular, cost overruns associated with the construction of Pepsi Center had shareholders up in arms. Finally, in 1997, COMSAT agreed in principle to sell Ascent Entertainment Group, the umbrella corporation for its sporting assets, to Liberty Media. However, Liberty was not interested in sports ownership at the time (though it has since bought the Atlanta Braves), and made the deal contingent upon Ascent selling the Avalanche and Nuggets.

After almost two years, Ascent sold the Avalanche and Nuggets to Walmart heirs Bill and Nancy Laurie for $400 million. However, a group of Ascent shareholders sued, claiming that the sale price was several million dollars too low. Ascent then agreed to sell the Avalanche and Nuggets to Denver banking tycoon Donald Sturm for $461 million.

However, a new wrinkle appeared when the city of Denver refused to transfer the parcel of land on which Pepsi Center stood unless Sturm promised to keep the Avalanche and Nuggets in Denver for at least 25 years. Sturm had bought the teams in his own name, and the city wanted to protect taxpayers in the event Sturm either died or sold the teams. While Sturm was willing to make a long-term commitment to the city, he was not willing to be held responsible if he died or sold the teams. After negotiations fell apart, Liberty bought all of Ascent, but kept the Nuggets and Avalanche on the market. In the meantime, Issel had returned as head coach in 1999, but the protracted ownership negotiations made it difficult for him to rebuild the team. Just before the start of the 1999–2000 season, he told reporters there were several personnel moves he simply could not make due to the unstable ownership situation. Under the terms of Strum's purchase agreement, all basketball decisions required the approval of both Ascent/Liberty and Sturm.

Finally, in July 2000, the Avalanche, Nuggets and Pepsi Center were bought by real estate entrepreneur Stan Kroenke in a $450 million deal. Kroenke is the brother-in-law of the Lauries; his wife Ann is Nancy Laurie's sister. Liberty retained a 6.5% interest. As part of the deal, Kroenke placed the teams into a trust that would ensure the teams will stay in Denver until at least 2025. After the deal, Kroenke organized his sports assets under Kroenke Sports Enterprises.

=== 2003–2011: The Carmelo Anthony era ===
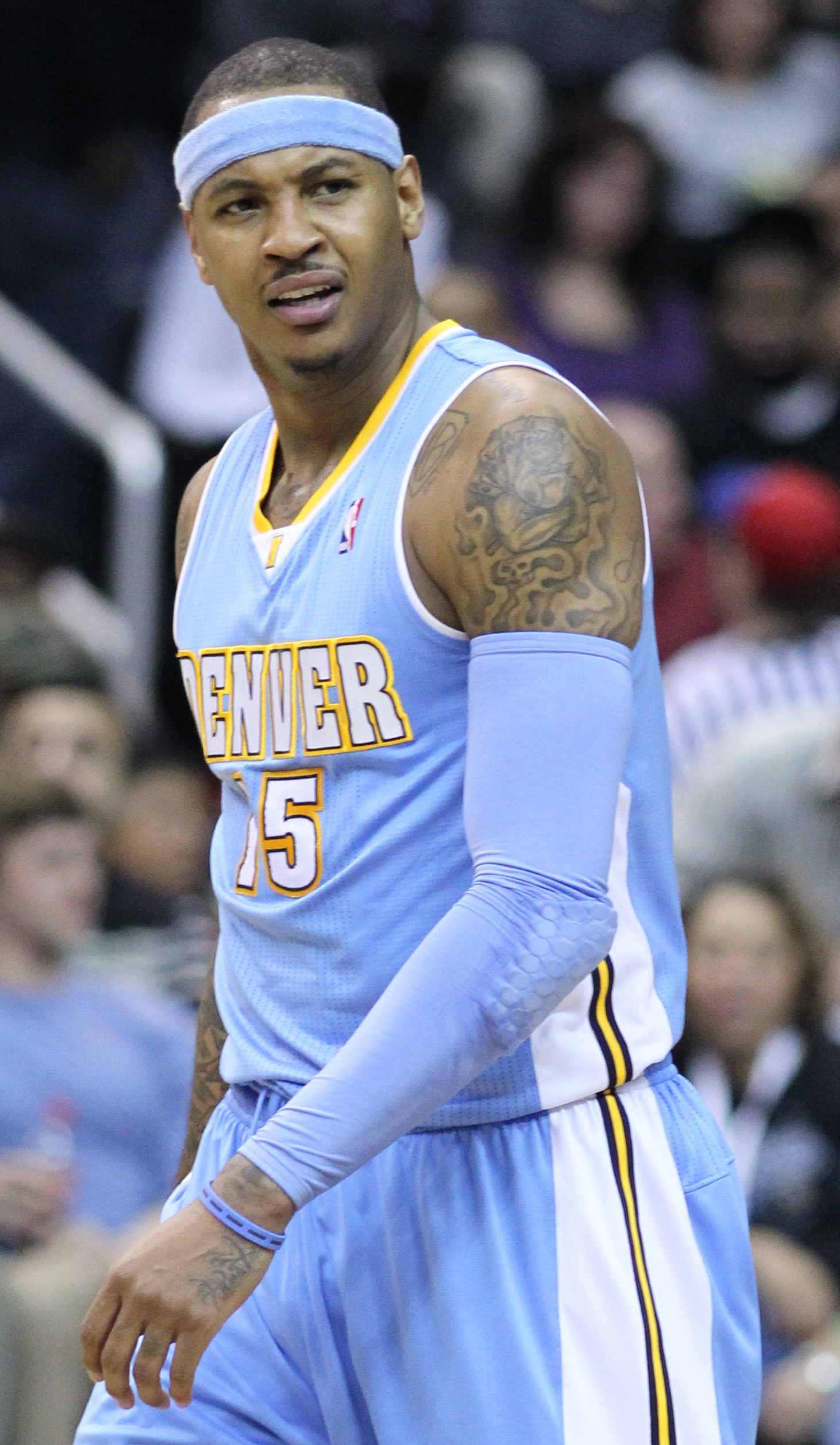
Denver drafted Carmelo Anthony 3rd overall in the 2003 draft.

In 2003, the Nuggets drafted future All-Star Carmelo Anthony with the third overall pick in the 2003 NBA draft. That same year, the team also updated their logos and uniforms, with a new color scheme of powder blue, gold and royal blue; the latter color was changed to navy blue in 2008. In just two months of the season, the Nuggets recorded more wins than they had in 5 1/2 months of play in 2002–03. Much of the reason for this incredible turnaround were the front-office moves of general manager Kiki Vandeweghe, a former Nuggets player who assumed general manager duties on August 9, 2001. In April, the turnaround was complete as they became the first franchise in NBA history to qualify for the postseason following a sub-20-win campaign the previous year since the NBA went to an 82-game schedule. They were eliminated in the first round four games to one by the Minnesota Timberwolves.

On December 28, 2004, head coach Jeff Bzdelik was fired from the organization and replaced by interim coach, former Los Angeles Lakers player and Los Angeles Sparks head coach Michael Cooper. The Nuggets later hired George Karl as a permanent replacement. Karl led the team to a record of 32–8 in the second half of the regular season, which vaulted the team into the playoffs for the second consecutive year.

In the playoffs, however, the Nuggets could not survive the San Antonio Spurs. After winning game one in San Antonio, the Nuggets proceeded to lose the next four games and lost the series 4–1. The Nuggets picked 20th in the 2005 NBA draft; it was acquired from the Washington Wizards via the Orlando Magic. Denver selected Julius Hodge with the pick. The Nuggets also had the 22nd overall selection in the draft, in which they selected Jarrett Jack, but sent him to the Portland Trail Blazers for rights to Portland's 27th overall pick, Linas Kleiza.

In 2005–06, for the first time in 18 years, the club won the Northwest division title. This placed the team in the third seed of the Western Conference playoffs. Denver played the Los Angeles Clippers who, despite their sixth seeding, had a better regular season record. As a result, the Clippers received home-court advantage. They defeated the Nuggets in 5 games. Shortly after, the Nuggets announced that general manager Kiki Vandeweghe's contract would not be renewed. He was replaced by Mark Warkentien.

On December 18, 2006, team co-captain Carmelo Anthony, shooting guard J. R. Smith and power forward Nenê were suspended by the NBA (15, 10 and one games respectively) for a fight that occurred in the last two minutes of a game against the New York Knicks two days earlier. The fight was sparked by Knicks rookie Mardy Collins, when he tackled J. R. Smith on a breakaway layup. According to Anthony, Knicks coach Isiah Thomas warned him to not go in the paint shortly before the hard foul.

==== 2006–2008: The Anthony and Iverson duo ====
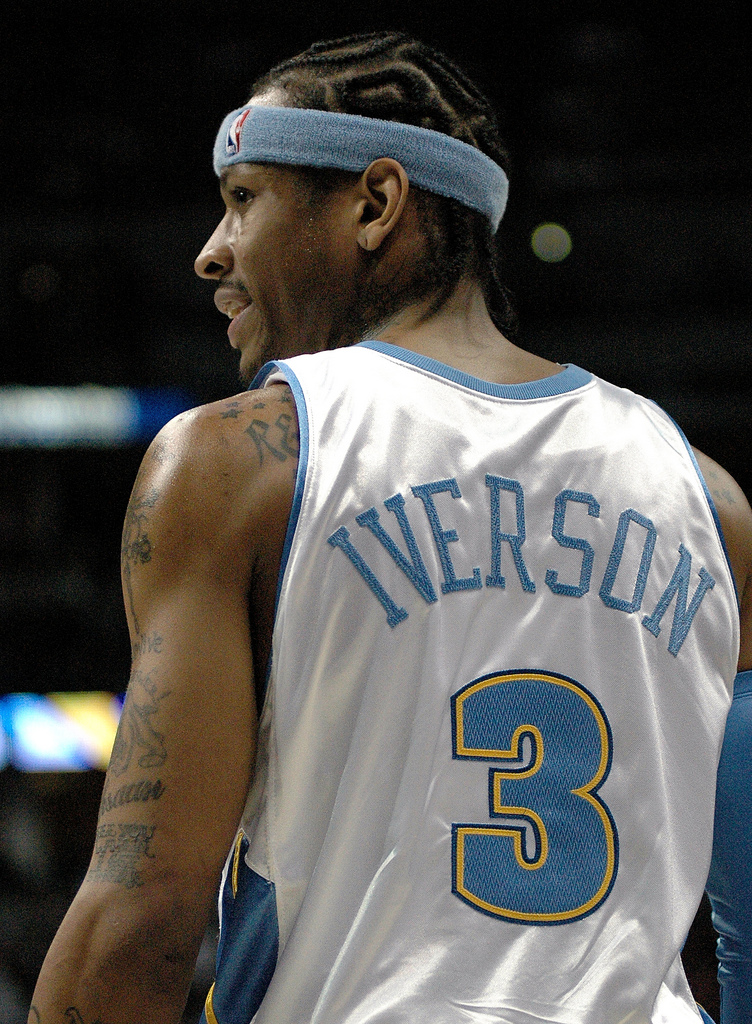
Allen Iverson helped Denver to their first 50-win season since 1988.

On December 19, 2006, the Nuggets traded Joe Smith, Andre Miller and two first-round draft picks of the 2007 NBA draft to the Philadelphia 76ers for Ivan McFarlin and superstar Allen Iverson (McFarlin was waived immediately following the trade's approval). The moves gave the Nuggets the top two scorers in the league at the time in Anthony and Iverson, who were both scoring over 30 points per game at the time of the trade. On January 11, 2007, Earl Boykins, Julius Hodge and cash considerations were traded to the Milwaukee Bucks, in exchange for point guard Steve Blake. With Iverson, many considered the Nuggets as one of the elite in the West. However, chemistry was an issue, as the Nuggets finished the season with the sixth seed, giving them a first-round matchup against the San Antonio Spurs. In the playoffs, the Nuggets took game one and home-court advantage away from the Spurs. However, as had occurred in the 2005 playoffs, the Spurs bounced back to sweep the next four, as the Nuggets were eliminated in the first round in five games for the fourth straight year.

On March 16, 2008, the Nuggets scored 168 points in a 168–116 home win over Seattle SuperSonics. It was the third-most points scored for a regulation game in NBA history (The Nuggets and the Pistons hold the spot for most combined points scored in a game which was over 360 points total.)

They finished the 2007–08 NBA season with exactly 50 wins as well as finishing the first half of that season 25–16 (50–32 overall record, tied for the third-best all-time Nuggets record since the team officially joined the NBA in 1976), following a 120–111 home victory over the Memphis Grizzlies in the last game of the season. It was the first time since the 1987–88 NBA season that the Nuggets finished with at least 50 wins in a season. Denver ended up as the eighth seed in the Western Conference of the 2008 NBA playoffs, and their 50 wins marked the highest win total for an eighth seed in NBA history. It also meant that for the first time in NBA history, all eight playoff seeds in a Conference had at least 50 wins. The Nuggets faced the top-seeded Los Angeles Lakers (57–25) in the first round. The seven games separating the Nuggets and the Lakers overall records is the closest margin between an eighth seed and a top seed since the NBA went to a 16-team playoff format in 1983–84. However, the Lakers swept them in four games, marking the second time in NBA history that a 50-win team was swept in a best-of-seven playoff series in the first round. It was Denver's fifth straight first-round loss.

==== 2008–2011: The Anthony and Billups duo ====
On July 16, 2008, at the end of the 2007–08 NBA season, the Nuggets traded former NBA Defensive Player of the Year Marcus Camby to the Los Angeles Clippers for a second-round draft pick (that was then traded to the New York Knicks for Renaldo Balkman).

On November 3, 2008, guard Allen Iverson was traded to the Detroit Pistons for Chauncey Billups, Antonio McDyess, and Cheikh Samb (part of the trade exception from the Marcus Camby trade was used to allow the deal to go through). McDyess was waived though on November 10, 2008, and he returned to Detroit shortly afterwards.

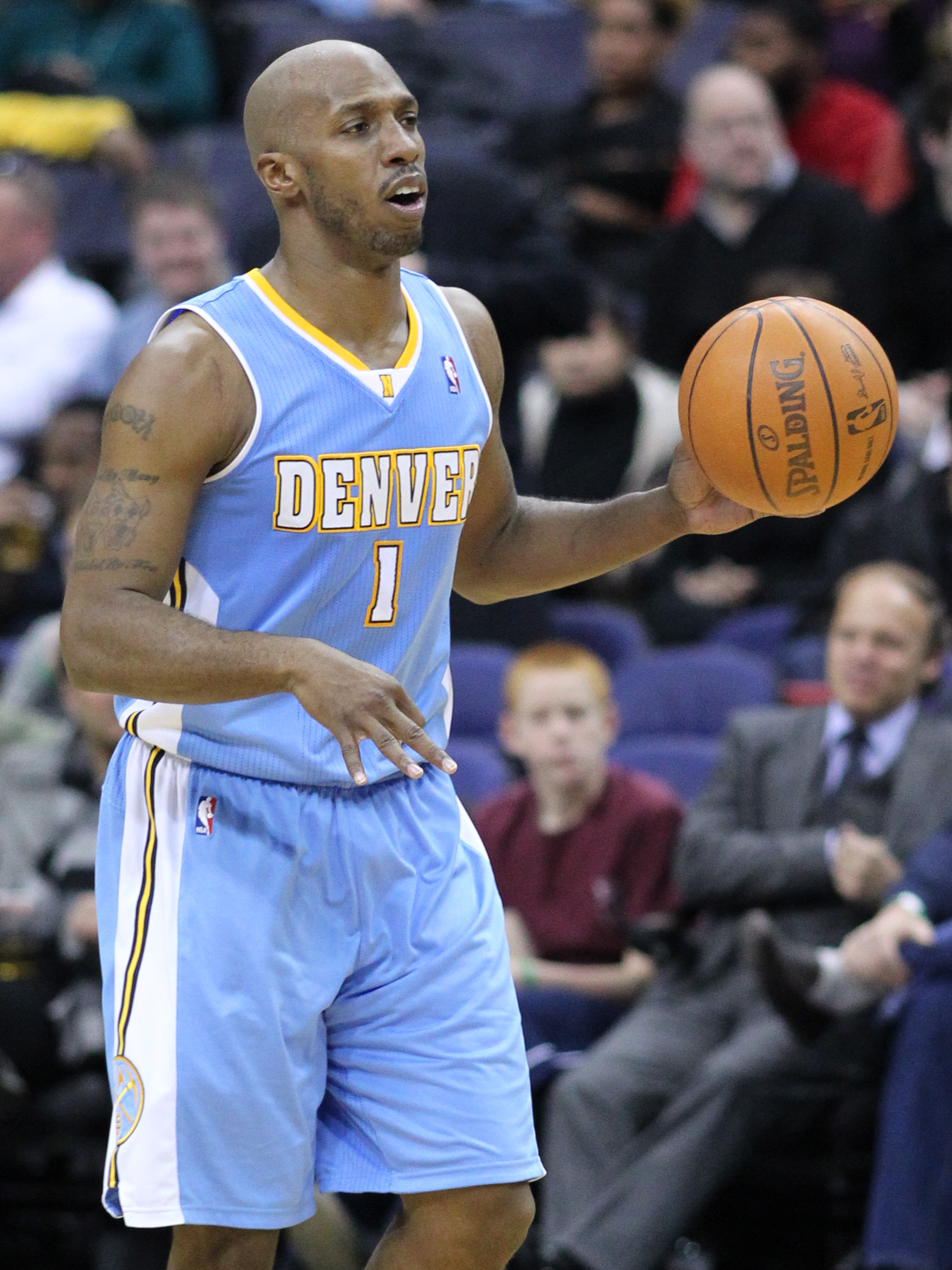
Chauncey Billups, acquired in 2008, helped the George Karl/Carmelo Anthony duo to their first playoff series win.

With Carmelo Anthony averaging 22.8 points per game and Billups averaging 6.4 assists in the 2008–09 NBA season, the Nuggets accomplished a great number of franchise milestones. Their 54–28 record matched the most wins the franchise had gotten since their induction in the NBA; their 27–14 start was also a record for wins in the first half of a season. This also marked the first time in the franchise's history the team had back-to-back 50-win seasons. They led the Northwest division for much of the season, eventually winning the division and placing #2 in the Western Conference, matching the highest the team has ever been seeded for the playoffs. General manager Mark Warkentien won the NBA Executive of the Year Award for the Nuggets' improvement. They won game one of the playoffs against the New Orleans Hornets, the first time they had home-court advantage since 1987–88 and also, the 29-point victory was the largest victory for any team for game one of the first round of the 2009 NBA playoffs. Chauncey Billups set a Nuggets franchise record with the most three-pointers in a playoff game with 8, and his 19 three-pointers in total is also a Nuggets record for threes made in a playoff series. They went on to beat the Hornets in five games, including a 58-point victory in game four which matched the most lopsided win in NBA playoff history. They then went on to beat the sixth seed Dallas Mavericks four games to one in the Conference Semifinals to make their first trip to the Western Conference Finals since 1985. That was also the first time the Nuggets had ever led 3–0 in a best-of-seven series. Up to that point, they held an NBA Playoffs-high in three-pointers made and a 16-point average margin of victory, the largest average margin of victory in the first 10 playoff games in NBA Playoff history. They lost the first game of the Western Conference Finals against the Los Angeles Lakers but won the second game to tie the series. Anthony became the first Denver player to score at least 30 points in five consecutive playoff games since the Nuggets joined the NBA in 1976. They lost the series 4–2, ending Denver's longest playoff run in team history.

In the 2009 NBA draft, the Nuggets traded a first-round draft pick acquired from the Charlotte Bobcats to the Minnesota Timberwolves for the rights to rookie Ty Lawson, who was drafted 18th overall. On July 13, 2009, the Nuggets traded a second-round draft pick to the Detroit Pistons for Arron Afflalo (part of the trade exception from the Iverson trade was used to allow the deal to go through) and Walter Sharpe. Afflalo replaced starting guard Dahntay Jones, who signed with the Indiana Pacers. However, on August 10, the Nuggets lost forward Linas Kleiza, who signed with Olympiacos Piraeus of the Greek League.

The 2009–10 season saw Anthony average 28.2 points per game and Billups average a career-high 19.6 points per game. In the opening two games of the season, Anthony totaled 71 points, scoring 30 points in the home opener and 41 the next night, in wins against division rivals Utah Jazz and Portland Trail Blazers, respectively. Anthony became one of two players in the Nuggets' history to open with more than 70 points through two games (Alex English also accomplished the feat). It was also only the second time since 1987 that the Nuggets started the season 2–0. They later went 3–0, 4–0, and 5–0 for the first time since 1985 after defeating the Memphis Grizzlies, Indiana Pacers, and New Jersey Nets respectively. Despite injuries that caused all three captains – Carmelo Anthony, Chauncey Billups, and Kenyon Martin – to miss a total of 46 games, and then later on in the second half of the season the absence of head coach George Karl, who underwent treatment for neck and throat cancer, the Nuggets were still able to win 53 games (third consecutive 50-win season, a Nuggets first) for the season which gave them a second consecutive Northwest division title and finished as the fourth seed in the West Conference. However, they were eliminated by the Utah Jazz 4–2, their sixth first-round elimination in 7 seasons. Anthony averaged a career-high 30.7 points per game in the playoffs.

On July 14, 2010, the Nuggets bolstered their frontcourt depth by signing Al Harrington. During the 2010 off-season, Masai Ujiri replaced Mark Warkentien as the general manager, while Josh Kroenke was named team president.

=== 2011–2015: Period of rebuilding ===
On February 22, 2011, after months of speculation that he wanted to leave the Nuggets, Carmelo Anthony was traded alongside Chauncey Billups, Anthony Carter, Shelden Williams and Renaldo Balkman to the New York Knicks in a multi-player deal also involving the Minnesota Timberwolves in which the Nuggets received Wilson Chandler, Raymond Felton, Danilo Gallinari, Timofey Mozgov and Kosta Koufos. On the day when the trade was done, the Nuggets were left with nine players to play against the Memphis Grizzlies. The Nuggets won 120–107, where they led by as many as 27 points. In the closing minutes of the game, the arena resounded with chants of "Who needs Melo?" George Karl said after the game, "Our guys, when their backs are confronted with a difficult situation, they usually play at a high level. We always react to tough situations in a very positive way." However, the trade only seemed to make them better. Post-trade, the Nuggets averaged 24.1 assists, showing their newfound teamwork. The defense of the Nuggets also improved, from allowing 105.2 points per game before the trade to 97.1 points per game for the remainder of the season. Despite the franchise-changing trade which saw eighteen different starting lineups through the whole season, Denver finished with 50 wins (fourth consecutive 50 win seasons for the first time in Nuggets history), clinching the fifth seed of the Western Conference. They met the Oklahoma City Thunder in the first round of the playoffs and lost four games to one.

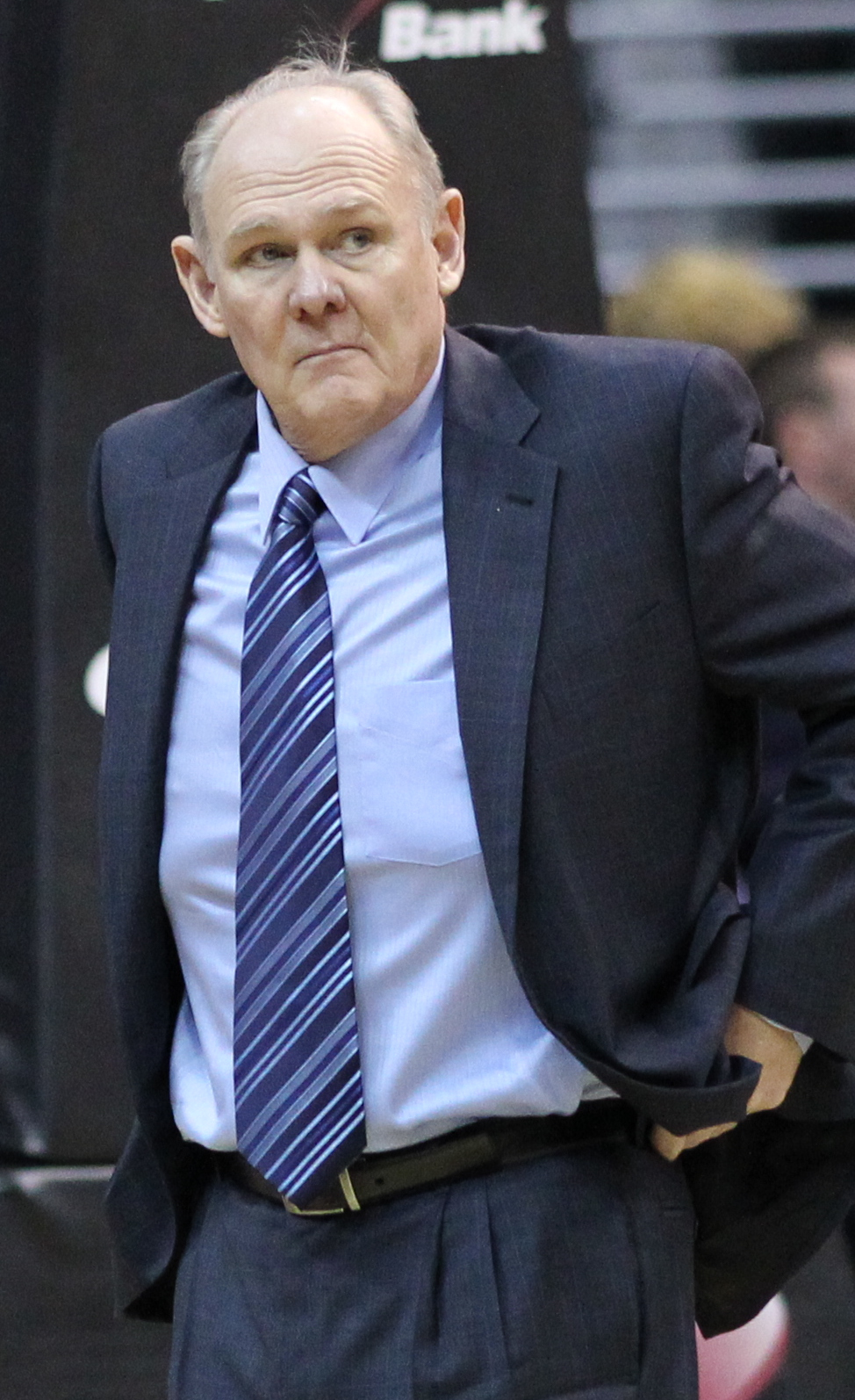
George Karl was named NBA Coach of the Year in 2013, his final season in Denver

The first full season of the post-Melo Nuggets saw the steady rise of Danilo Gallinari, who averaged 17 points, 5.2 rebounds and 2.6 assists through the first 25 games of the season, which resulted to the Nuggets' best start through the first 20 games. However, Gallinari sustained injuries to his ankle, thumb, and wrist that year. On March 15, 2012, the Nuggets decided to make their team younger by trading Nenê, who had played the previous nine seasons for Denver, to the Washington Wizards for JaVale McGee. In his first game as a Nugget, McGee made a putback dunk off an Arron Afflalo miss which proved to be the game-winning basket in Denver's 116–115 victory over the Detroit Pistons. In two of the Nuggets' final games of their season, McGee finally earned national attention when he had a 16-point, 15-rebound effort, and a 21-point, 14-rebound effort in Denver's playoff series against the Los Angeles Lakers. These performances helped the Nuggets come back from a 2–0 and a 3–1 series deficit, but the Nuggets eventually lost in game seven, 87–96.

On August 10, 2012, Denver was involved in a four-team trade where they received All-Star Andre Iguodala and sent Arron Afflalo and Al Harrington to the Orlando Magic. This same trade also sent Dwight Howard to the Los Angeles Lakers. After the trade, Iguodala tweeted "I'm excited to be joining the Denver Nuggets and I know my best basketball is ahead of me!" Despite losing their first three games, the 2012–2013 Nuggets finished with a franchise-best 57–25 record, and a 38–3 record in Pepsi Center (the Washington Wizards, Miami Heat, and Minnesota Timberwolves were the only 3 visitors to defeat Denver on their home during the regular season). Denver also clinched the third seed in the Western Conference, with a first-round matchup with the Golden State Warriors. The Nuggets won game one 97–95 on their home court on a last-second Andre Miller game-winner, but the Warriors won the next three games, putting the Nuggets on the brink of elimination. Denver won game five at home to keep their season alive, but the Warriors eliminated the Nuggets in game six, winning 92–88 in Oakland. It was Denver's ninth first-round loss in the previous 10 seasons, and the eighth of Karl's tenure. Although Karl won that year's NBA Coach of the Year Award and had led Denver to the playoffs in every year of his nine-year tenure, it was not enough to keep him from being fired after the season.

Along with Karl being fired, Denver saw a major shake-up in the front office with Executive of the Year Masai Ujiri accepting the general manager position with the Toronto Raptors and vice-president Pete D'Alessandro, who was expected to replace Ujiri, being named general manager of the Sacramento Kings. On June 21, 2013, Tim Connelly was announced as the new general manager. To replace Karl, the Nuggets hired the Indiana Pacers' associate head coach, former NBA player, Brian Shaw. Guard-forward Andre Iguodala was sent to the Golden State Warriors in a sign-and-trade in which they acquired guard Randy Foye from the Utah Jazz. They also signed center-forward JJ Hickson, who was previously with the Portland Trail Blazers and 5 ft 9 in (1.75 m) guard Nate Robinson, who played for the Bulls during the 2012–2013 season. They also acquired Darrell Arthur from the Memphis Grizzlies and 55th pick Joffrey Lauvergne in return for Kosta Koufos. In a tough 2013–14 season which saw numerous injuries to key players missing a significant amount of the season, the Nuggets finished with 36 wins, their worst in 11 years, and missed the playoffs.

During the 2014 off-season, the Nuggets brought back Arron Afflalo for whom they traded Evan Fournier. During the 2014 NBA draft, Denver traded their first lottery pick (11th overall pick) since 2003 to Chicago to acquire two later first-round draft picks, which were used to draft Jusuf Nurkić and Gary Harris; with the 41st overall pick and their first pick of the second round of the draft, the Nuggets selected 19-year old Nikola Jokić from Mega Basket in Serbia. On March 3, 2015, general manager Tim Connelly announced the Nuggets fired head coach Brian Shaw and named Melvin Hunt interim head coach. Jokić would go on to be widely regarded as the biggest draft steal in NBA history.

=== 2015–present: The Nikola Jokić era ===
==== 2015–2018: Early years ====
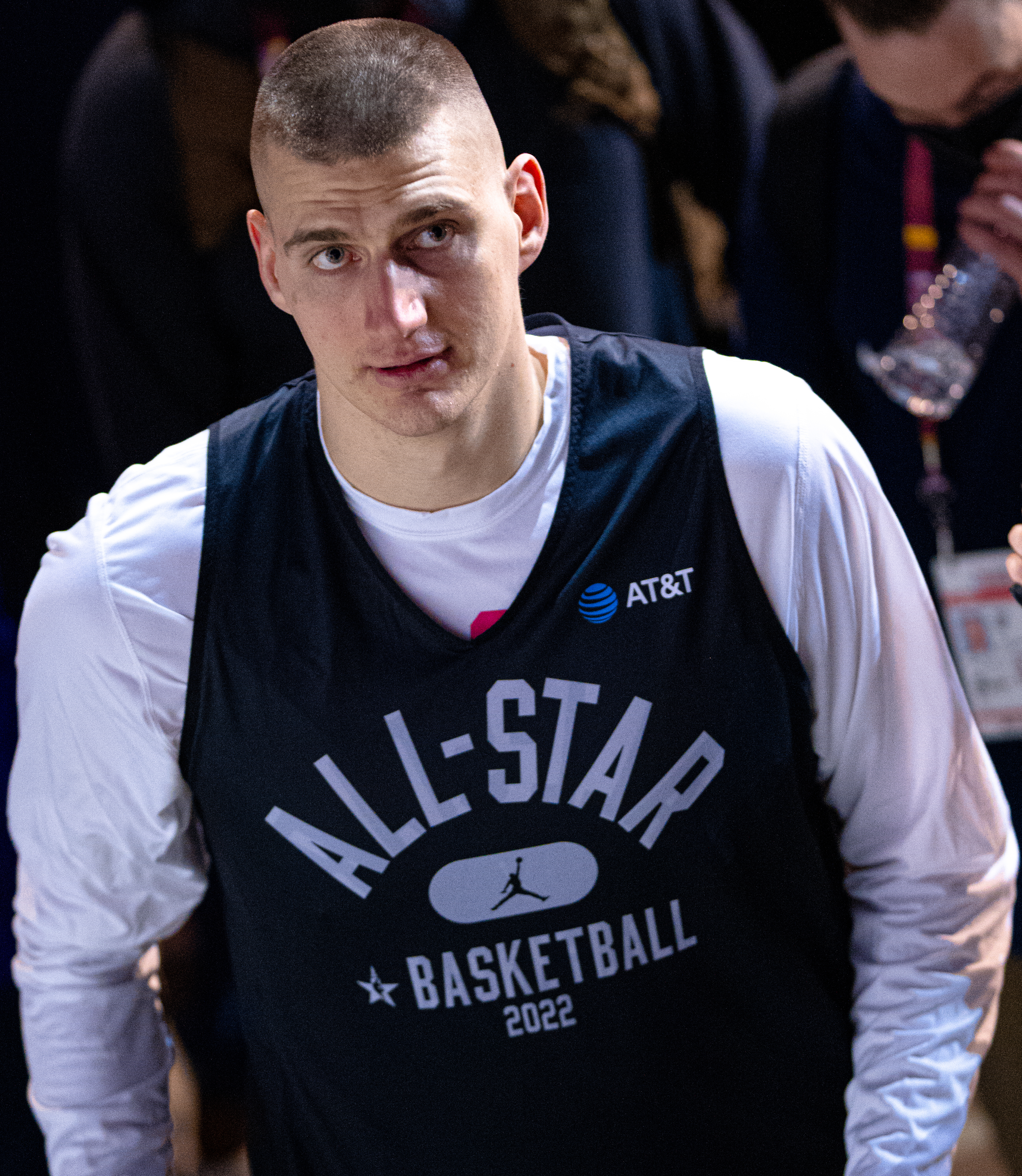
Nikola Jokić was named NBA Most Valuable Player in 2020–21 (first player in franchise history), 2021–22 and 2023–24.

On June 15, 2015, at the end of the 2014–15 season, Michael Malone was named as the new head coach of the Denver Nuggets. Entering the 2015 NBA draft with their lowest draft pick (seventh overall) since 2003, the Nuggets drafted Emmanuel Mudiay who was widely regarded as the top point guard of the draft, leading to speculation that current starting point guard, Ty Lawson, would be traded. On July 14, 2015, Lawson was arrested in Los Angeles on suspicion of driving under the influence, his second in six months. The Nuggets traded Lawson a week later to the Houston Rockets along with a second round draft pick for Joey Dorsey, Nick Johnson, Kostas Papanikolaou, Pablo Prigioni (all of whom were waived), and a first round pick that was used to draft Juan Hernangómez.

Under Michael Malone's leadership, the Denver Nuggets slightly started to improve while primarily relying on the youth movement consisting of Mudiay, Jokić, Gary Harris and later also on the recovered Jusuf Nurkić. On January 27, 2016, it was announced that both Mudiay and Jokić would participate in BBVA Compass Rising Stars Challenge during NBA All-Star 2016. On February 18, the Denver Nuggets announced that they decided to trade veteran shooting guard Randy Foye to Oklahoma City Thunder in exchange for D. J. Augustin, Steve Novak and two second-round draft picks. One day later, JJ Hickson and the newly acquired Novak were waived.

Over the course of the 2016 NBA draft, the Denver Nuggets added the Kentucky guard Jamal Murray as well as Juan Hernangómez, Malik Beasley, and Petr Cornelie. Meanwhile, their 56th pick was traded to the Oklahoma City Thunder. On February 13, 2017, Nurkić was traded, along with the rights to the Memphis Grizzlies' 2017 first-round draft pick, to the Portland Trail Blazers in exchange for Mason Plumlee, a 2018 second-round pick and cash considerations. Thanks to the continuing improvements of Jokić, the Nuggets would make significant improvements to their team, although they would be just one game shy from reaching the 2017 NBA playoffs, finishing 9th in the Western Conference.

On June 15, 2017, the Nuggets officially promoted both Artūras Karnišovas and Tim Connelly to become the team's newest general manager and president of basketball operations respectively. In the 2017 NBA draft, the Denver Nuggets selected Tyler Lydon, Vlatko Čančar, and Monté Morris, with the 24th, 49th, and 51st picks respectively. On December 2, 2017, the Nuggets would retire Fat Lever's number during their 115–100 win over the Los Angeles Lakers. Despite compiling their first winning season since 2012–13, they missed the 2018 playoffs, the fifth straight missed playoff run, after losing to the Minnesota Timberwolves in a win-or-go-home situation in the regular season finale, also ending the Timberwolves' 14-year playoff drought. The Nuggets finished 9th, one game behind the eighth seeded Timberwolves.

==== 2018–2020: Rise of Jokić ====
In the 2018 NBA draft, the Nuggets drafted Michael Porter Jr. and traded with the Magic to get Jarred Vanderbilt. On January 31, 2019, Jokić received his first All-Star selection as a Western Conference reserve for the 2019 NBA All-Star Game, becoming the Nuggets' first All-Star since Carmelo Anthony in 2011. The Nuggets finished the 2018–2019 season with 54 wins, first in their division and second in the Western Conference, and made the playoffs for the first time since 2012–13. In the first round, the Nuggets played against the San Antonio Spurs, winning the round in game seven. The Nuggets were eliminated in the second round by the Portland Trail Blazers in 7 games. Game three of the second round had four overtimes, tying a 1953 game for the longest NBA playoff game.

Following the suspension of the 2019–20 NBA season, the Nuggets were one of the 22 teams invited to the NBA Bubble to participate in the final eight games of the regular season. Led by Jokić and Murray, the team is the first in NBA playoff history to consecutively come from 3–1 deficits. In the first round, they defeated Utah in 7 games in a record-breaking scoring duel between Jamal Murray and Donovan Mitchell. The Nuggets repeated the same feat against Paul George and Kawhi Leonard of the Los Angeles Clippers in the second round, becoming the only team in NBA history to overcome multiple 3–1 deficits in a single playoff run. In the Western Conference Finals, the Nuggets' title race came to an end, after the eventual champion Los Angeles Lakers trounced them in five games.

==== 2020–2022: Back-to-back MVP seasons for Jokić ====
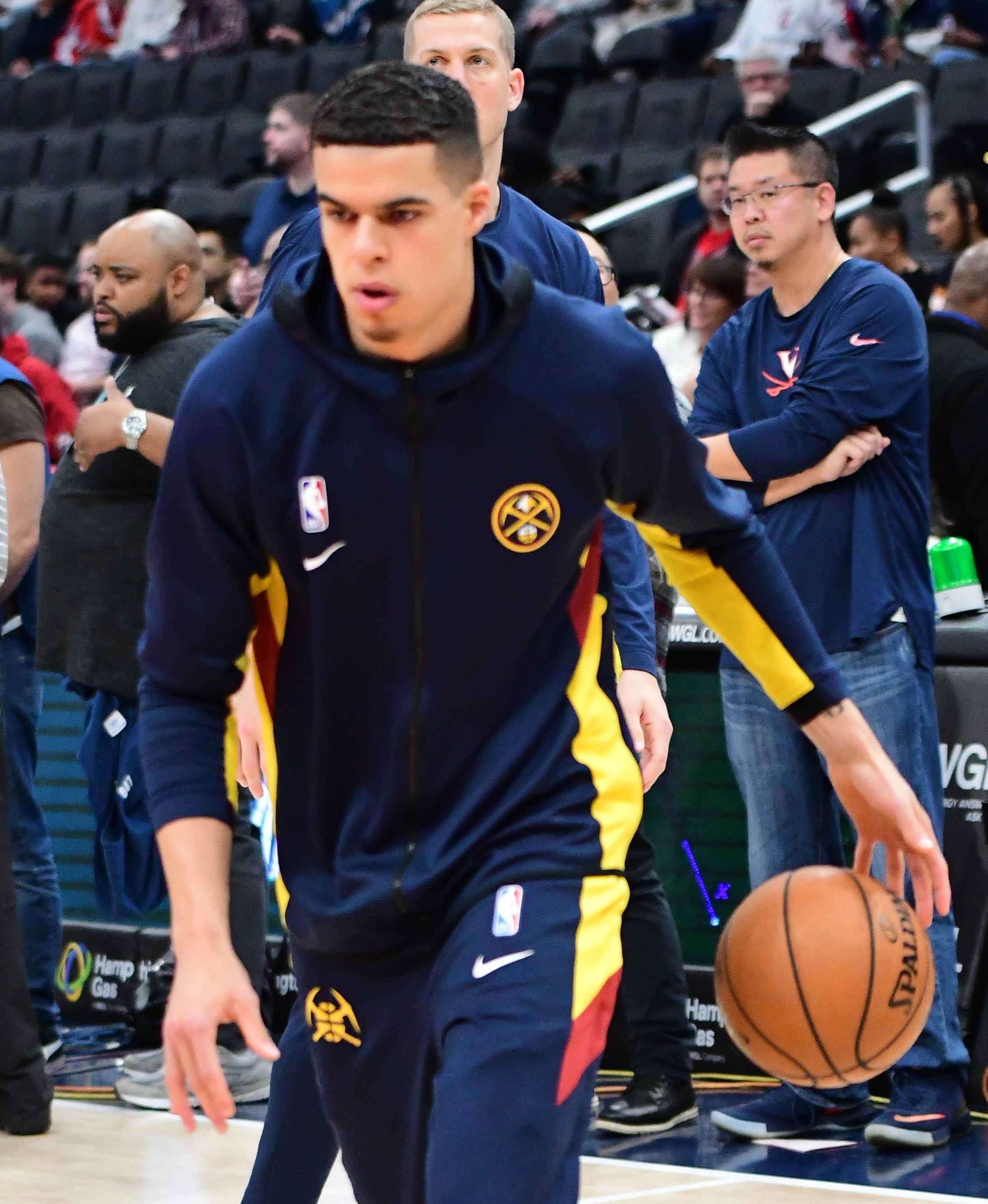
Michael Porter Jr. was drafted as the 14th overall pick in 2018 and helped the Nuggets to their first title in 2023

In the 2020–21 NBA season, Jokić was named the NBA Most Valuable Player, becoming the first center since Shaquille O'Neal in 1999–2000 and the first player in Nuggets franchise history to win the award. He also became the first Serbian player, third European player overall (along with Dirk Nowitzki of Germany and Giannis Antetokounmpo of Greece), and sixth international player to ever win the award (along with Hakeem Olajuwon of Nigeria, Tim Duncan of the U.S. Virgin Islands, Steve Nash of Canada, Nowitzki of Germany, and Antetokounmpo of Greece). Jokić also became the lowest ever drafted player at #41, and the first player in NBA history to be selected in the second round of the common era draft, to win the MVP award. Although the Nuggets finished the season with the third seed in the Western Conference and beat their first round opponents, the Portland Trail Blazers, in six games, the loss of starting guard Jamal Murray to an ACL tear contributed to the team's sweep by the eventual Western Conference champions, the second-seeded Phoenix Suns.

The following season saw more poor injury luck for the Denver Nuggets. Nine games into the season, starting forward Michael Porter Jr. joined Murray on the sidelines with season-ending back surgery. In spite of the injuries, Jokić and starting power forward Aaron Gordon carried the Nuggets to the sixth seed, the former becoming the first-ever player in NBA history to accumulate 2,000 points, 1,000 rebounds, and 500 assists in a single season. Jokić went on to receive the Kia MVP Award for the second year in a row – joining 12 other players in NBA history to achieve the award in back to back years, and the first center to do so since Moses Malone in 1981–82 and 1982–83. In the first round of the playoffs, Jokić's Nuggets fell five games to the Golden State Warriors, who went on to win the championship.

==== 2022–2023: First NBA title ====
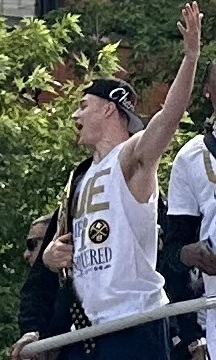
Christian Braun celebrates during the Nuggets' championship parade

In the 2022–23 season, elevated by the off-season acquisitions of Kentavious Caldwell-Pope and Bruce Brown, the Nuggets secured the top seed in the Western Conference with 53 wins and 29 losses, two games ahead of the Memphis Grizzlies. The Nuggets defeated the Minnesota Timberwolves 4–1 in the first round of the 2023 playoffs, before defeating the Phoenix Suns 4–2 in the Conference Semifinals. The Nuggets' playoff dominance continued in the Conference Finals; spearheaded by outstanding play from Jokić, who was named the Western Conference Finals Most Valuable Player, the team swept the Los Angeles Lakers in four games to advance to their first ever NBA Finals. This also marked the first time that the Nuggets had beaten the Lakers in a playoff series (having previously been 0–7 against them), as well as the first playoff series sweep in franchise history. In the NBA Finals, on June 12, 2023, the Nuggets would beat the Eastern Conference champion Miami Heat 4–1 to win their first NBA championship, with Jokić receiving the NBA Finals Most Valuable Player Award.

==== 2023–2024: Title defense and Jokić's third MVP season ====
In the 2023–24 season, the first season in league history with the Nuggets as defending champions, Denver finished with the 2nd seed in the Western Conference with a 57–25 record, tying with the Oklahoma City Thunder and finishing 1 game ahead of the Minnesota Timberwolves. On May 8, 2024, Jokić won his third Most Valuable Player Award, becoming the ninth player to do so and tying with other greats such as Moses Malone and Larry Bird. The Nuggets faced the Los Angeles Lakers in the first round and defeated them in five games. Jamal Murray finished off the Lakers with a game-winning buzzer-beater over Anthony Davis to complete a 20-point comeback in game two, and later hit another game-winner in game five to eliminate the Lakers. Next, they faced the Minnesota Timberwolves in the second round. Along the way, Murray hit a half-court shot in game four to end halftime and stared at NBA on TNT announcer Kevin Harlan. The Nuggets ultimately blew a 20-point lead in game seven and lost to the Timberwolves.

==== 2024–present: Change of head coach ====
With the 22nd overall pick, the Phoenix Suns drafted DaRon Holmes II from Dayton. He was later traded to the Nuggets for the 28th overall pick (Ryan Dunn), the 56th overall pick, a 2026 second-round pick, and a 2031 second-round pick. Holmes tore his Achilles in the NBA Summer League. On March 7, 2025, Jokić became the first NBA player to record a game with at least 30 points, 20 rebounds, and 20 assists. Nuggets notably signed former MVP Russell Westbrook. They lost a reliable shooting guard Kentavious Caldwell-Pope.

On April 8, 2025, the Nuggets fired both head coach Michael Malone, and general manager Calvin Booth. In the 2024–25 season, Denver finished with the 4th seed in the Western Conference with a 50-32 record, tying with the Los Angeles Lakers, and Los Angeles Clippers, and 1 game ahead of the Minnesota Timberwolves. In the first round, they played the Los Angeles Clippers and won in seven games. On the way to winning the series, Aaron Gordon scored a buzzer-beating dunk in game four. Next, they faced the Oklahoma City Thunder in the second round, where Gordon stunned the Thunder crowd with a game-winning three-pointer in game one. The Nuggets ended up losing the series in seven games to the eventual champions. The Nuggets hired their interim head coach David Adelman as their official new head coach.

On September 8, 2026, the Nuggets has signed DeMar DeRozan for a one–year deal in a $3.9 million contract.

== Season-by-season record ==
List of the last five seasons completed by the Nuggets. For the full season-by-season history, see List of Denver Nuggets seasons.

Note: GP = Games played, W = Wins, L = Losses, W–L% = Winning percentage

Season	GP	W	L	W–L%	Finish	Playoffs
2021–22	82	48	34	.585	2nd, Northwest	Lost in first round, 1–4 (Warriors)
2022–23	82	53	29	.646	1st, Northwest	NBA champions, 4–1 (Heat)
2023–24	82	57	25	.695	2nd, Northwest	Lost in conference semifinals, 3–4 (Timberwolves)
2024–25	82	50	32	.610	2nd, Northwest	Lost in conference semifinals, 3–4 (Thunder)
2025–26	82	54	28	.659	2nd, Northwest	Lost in first round, 2–4 (Timberwolves)

== Home arenas ==
- Denver Auditorium Arena (1967–1975)
- Denver Coliseum (1967–1975)
- McNichols Sports Arena (1975–1999)
- Ball Arena (1999–present)
  - formerly known as Pepsi Center (1999–2020)

== Colors, logos and uniforms ==
The Nuggets have displayed numerous color schemes, logos, and uniforms throughout their franchise history, including their days in the American Basketball Association (ABA) as the "Denver Rockets."

=== 1967–1974: Denver Rockets (ABA) ===
From 1967–68 through 1970–71, the Denver Rockets' logos, uniforms, and colors were black, orange, and white. From 1971–72 through 1973–74, the Rockets wore gold and purple (Columbine blue) uniforms, and their logo featured a cartoonish rocket bouncing a gold and purple basketball, with a purple and white snow-capped mountain in the background.

=== 1974–1982: Maxie The Miner ===
During the Nuggets' final two seasons in the ABA, the team's logo featured a cartoonish miner known as "Maxie The Miner," with a large red beard, a pick-axe in one hand and a red and blue basketball in the other hand. When the Nuggets joined the NBA in the 1976–77 season, they retained the pick-axe logo on their jerseys from the ABA days. The home uniforms feature "Nuggets" in red, with a red pick-axe inside a blue oval, and gold numbers with blue trim in front, blue numbers and letters at the back. The road uniforms were blue, with "Denver" in blue with a blue pick-axe in a red oval, and gold numbers in front, white numbers and letters at the back. The Nuggets simplified their uniforms following their inaugural season in the NBA. From 1977 to 1982, their home uniforms were white, with a "Nuggets" script written across the chest in a darker royal blue, with gold trim around the script and jersey numbers. The royal blue away jersey had "Denver" written across the chest in white, with gold trim.

=== 1982–1993: Rainbow City Skyline ===
From 1982–83 through 1992–93, the Nuggets wore the Denver "rainbow city" skyline across the chest and back on both the home and away uniforms. Some fans also call the iconic 1980s logo the "Tetris" logo, due to the buildings that shadow the mountains on the logo which are in the shape of squares. The initial home uniforms were white with navy and green trim, with "Nuggets" and the uniform number in gold with blue trim. The player names were written in block lettering and in a straight position. In 1985, they changed the shade of blue to royal and eliminated green, and in 1986, changed the back numbers to royal blue. In 1991, coinciding with the debut of Dikembe Mutombo, the word "Nuggets" became white with royal blue and gold trim. The road uniforms were initially navy blue with green trim, with "Denver" and the uniform number in white with gold trim, before likewise changing it to royal blue, with gold serifed block letters for player names in an arch (royal blue in home uniforms). The font and "skyline" logo were later reintroduced on alternate jerseys beginning with the 2012–13 season.

=== 1993–2003: Navy blue, metallic gold and maroon ===
For the 1993–94 season, the Nuggets drastically changed their look, with a navy blue, metallic gold and maroon color scheme on their uniforms. The "rainbow city skyline," which had been synonymous with the team since 1981, was replaced with a logo that featured a navy blue snow-capped mountain above an enlarged western-style "Nuggets" wordmark in metallic gold, and a curved maroon ribbon with a "Denver" wordmark positioned in between the mountain and the "Nuggets" wordmark. The home jerseys had a "Nuggets" script in a modified version of the typeface Aachen across the chest in navy blue, with maroon and metallic gold trim around the script and numbers, while the navy blue away jerseys had the same script in metallic gold, with maroon and white trim. The Nuggets wore these uniforms for a decade, until the end of the 2002–03 season.

=== 2003–2018: Powder blue, navy blue and gold ===
For the 2003–04 season, the Nuggets made another uniform change, coinciding with Carmelo Anthony's debut, with a color scheme of powder blue, gold (yellow) and royal blue. The primary logo, featuring a snow-capped mountain, curved ribbon with a "Denver" wordmark and an enlarged western-style "Nuggets" workmark (see previous section), was modified, with the mountain royal blue, the ribbon powder blue and the "Nuggets" wordmark a golden yellow. Like the 1990s uniforms, the Nuggets' revised jerseys also had the "Aachen" typeface across the chest—it was "Nuggets" in powder blue, with royal blue and gold trim on the home white jersey, while the powder blue road jerseys had "Denver" in white, with gold and royal blue trim. These jerseys, along with the team logo, were tweaked prior to the 2008–09 season, with the royal blue replaced by the shade of navy blue that was part of the team's color scheme from 1993 to 2003. These jerseys were used until the 2014–15 season, while the snow-capped mountain logo would serve as the team's primary logo until the 2017–18 season. In the 2005–06 season, the Nuggets also introduced an alternate logo, as well as an alternate navy blue uniform. The alternate logo featured twin intersecting gold pick-axes in a powder blue circle, with a half-white/half-yellow "mountain peaks" at the top of the circle and a basketball with gold outlining and navy blue accents at the bottom of the circle. The navy blue jersey featured an alternate "Nuggets" script in gold, with navy blue interior trim and powder blue outlining. This uniform was used until the end of the 2011–12 season, while the circular "pick axe" logo would become the team's new primary logo for the 2018–19 season.

While the "pick axe" logo was officially introduced in 2005, former NBA director of creative services Tom O'Grady had planned on introducing the logo as early as 1998, but then-NBA commissioner David Stern was not informed of the possible logo change. As a result, the logo was shelved until it was brought in as an alternate seven years later.

For the 2012–13 season, the Nuggets unveiled a gold alternate jersey, replacing the aforementioned navy blue jerseys that had been used during the previous seven seasons. This jersey featured a return to the Denver "rainbow skyline" logo, but used the team's "Aachen" typeface and color scheme of powder blue, navy and gold.

For the 2015–16 season, the Nuggets modified the script and numbering fonts on their home and away jerseys, with a gold "Nuggets" script on the home white jersey and a gold "Denver" script on the powder blue away jersey—both with the "Coliseum" typeface. Navy blue numerals trimmed in gold, as well as navy blue nameplates, were featured on both the home and away jerseys. The alternate gold "skyline" jerseys were also tweaked, with a retro "Nuggets" wordmark (that was used on the 1980s rainbow skyline jerseys) in navy blue trimmed in white. The numerals were also modified with the Coliseum typeface, but remained white, with powder blue interior trim and navy blue exterior outlining.

The Nuggets updated their uniforms for the 2017–18 season. The light uniform (dubbed by Nike as the "Association" jersey), the dark uniform (dubbed by Nike as the "Icon" jersey) and the alternate uniform (dubbed by Nike as the "Statement" jersey) saw the return of navy blue as a primary color for the first time since the 2002–03 season, while powder blue was drastically diminished and relegated to trim color status. Slight tweaks were made to the striping and lettering. The Nuggets' gold "Statement" jersey made some noticeable alterations as well, relegating the navy, powder blue and white rainbow to the sides and relocating the number to the bottom. Western Union became the team's jersey sponsor.

=== 2018–present: Evolved new identity ===
For the 2018–19 season, the Nuggets modified their logos and uniforms, featuring various color schemes that the team has worn in their history. The current color scheme consists of midnight blue (navy), sunshine yellow, flatirons red (maroon) and skyline blue (royal)—the latter color is only featured on the "Statement" jersey and two of the team's new alternate logos. Powder blue, which had been part of the team's color scheme since 2003, was eliminated from all logos and uniforms. The white "Association" jersey features "Nuggets" in flatirons red, with sunshine yellow trim and midnight blue numbers with sunshine yellow trim, while the midnight blue "Icon" jersey features "Denver" in sunshine yellow, with flatirons red trim and white numbers with flatirons red trim. Both sets also include mountain peak striping on the shorts and the pick axe logo on the waistline. The skyline blue "Statement" jersey features "Mile High City" in white surrounding sunshine yellow numbers, plus a midnight blue mountain peak silhouette and a sunshine yellow pick axe logo on the sides of the shorts. A modernized version of the skyline logo adorns the waistline. The circular "pick axe logo," which had served as the Nuggets' alternate logo since 2005, became the team's new primary logo, replacing the snow-capped mountain/enlarged western-style wordmark logo that had served as the team's primary logo (in three different versions) since 1993. The colors on the circular pick axe logo were also modified with the team's new color scheme.

Prior to the 2022–23 season, the "Statement" uniform was slightly tweaked with greater usage of gold on the letters, and red on the trim and mountain silhouette. Two "gold strikes" were also added between the words "Mile High City".

=== City Edition uniforms ===
In the 2017–18 season, Nike released a fourth uniform option known as the "City" series, which is updated annually. The Nuggets' first "City" uniform had a navy base, highlighting the pick-axe and mountain logo in front and incorporating sublimated mountain peak patterns on the shorts.

The Nuggets' 2018–19 "City" uniform was a callback to the team's 1982–93 rainbow uniforms, featuring a sublimated pattern of the rainbow logo and navy lettering. It was later brought back in the 2026–27 season. The same design was used for the 2019–20 "City" uniform, albeit with a black base and white letters; this uniform was reused during the 2025–26 season.

For 2020–21, the Nuggets kept the same "City" uniform design but eliminated the rainbow pattern and went with a red/yellow/orange gradient within the mountains and a flatirons red base.

The Nuggets were one of 27 teams to receive mashup "City" uniforms as part of the NBA's 75th anniversary during the 2021–22 season. Denver's uniform featured various design takes from past uniforms, including the throwback "Nuggets" wordmark and rainbow pattern from the 1980s uniforms, navy blue and stylized numbers from the 1993–2003 uniforms, Maxie the Miner and striping based on the ABA Nuggets uniforms, and the powder blue and "DN" alternate logo from the 2000s uniforms.

For the 2022–23 "City" uniform, the Nuggets wore white uniforms with navy letters, gold and red trim, and royal blue/white gradient stripes. The uniform was inspired by Denver's iconic architecture and its civic organizations.

For their 2023–24 "City" uniform, the Nuggets revisited the mountain-themed motif from their 1980s "Rainbow" uniforms. The black-based design featured sublimated blue lines representing the Rocky Mountains, and "5280" below in gold to symbolize Denver's high elevation. Other elements include a secondary team logo on the shorts, "Denver" wordmark on the waistband, white numbers above the left chest, and burgundy stripes. The uniform would be worn for select games, and in home games during the 2023 NBA in-season tournament, it would be paired with a specially-painted alternate blue court with a gold middle strip and the silhouette of the NBA Cup.

As part of the 2024–25 "City" uniform, the Nuggets revisited the "Rainbow" theme last seen in the 2018–2020 "City" uniforms, as well as last season's "5280" uniform. The white-based uniform featured "5280" in white trimmed in black along with rainbow mountain accents along the text and sides.

=== 2020 Earned Edition uniforms ===
As a reward for making the NBA playoffs the previous season, 16 teams were given an exclusive fifth or sixth uniform option: the "Earned" uniform. The Nuggets, having qualified for the 2020 NBA playoffs, were given this option in the 2020–21 season. The white-based design featured a modified pickaxe logo, with the top half in skyline blue and the bottom half in flatirons red. Names are written in blue and numbers are written in red with gold trim.

== Mascot ==
Rocky the Mountain Lion has been the official team mascot since the 1990–91 season. He was introduced to Nuggets fans on December 15, 1990, in a losing effort to the Phoenix Suns. He is best known for being the highest paid mascot in the NBA and for his beef with former NBA player and Hall of Famer Charles Barkley.

== Personnel ==
=== Current roster ===
Denver Nuggets roster
Players

Pos.	No.	Player	Height	Weight	DOB	From
F	3	Marvin Bagley III	6 ft 10 in (2.08 m)	235 lb (107 kg)	1999-03-14	Duke
G	0	Christian Braun	6 ft 6 in (1.98 m)	220 lb (100 kg)	2001-04-17	Kansas
F	7	Trevon Brazile	6 ft 10 in (2.08 m)	220 lb (100 kg)	2003-01-07	Arkansas
G/F	10	DeMar DeRozan	6 ft 6 in (1.98 m)	220 lb (100 kg)	1989-08-07	USC
G	11	Alpha Diallo	6 ft 7 in (2.01 m)	210 lb (95 kg)	1997-06-29	Providence
F	32	Aaron Gordon	6 ft 8 in (2.03 m)	235 lb (107 kg)	1995-09-16	Arizona
F	14	DaRon Holmes II	6 ft 9 in (2.06 m)	225 lb (102 kg)	2002-09-15	Dayton
F	13	Bryce Hopkins (TW)	6 ft 7 in (2.01 m)	225 lb (102 kg)	2002-09-07	St. John's
F	23	Cameron Johnson	6 ft 8 in (2.03 m)	210 lb (95 kg)	1996-03-03	North Carolina
C	15	Nikola Jokić	6 ft 11 in (2.11 m)	284 lb (129 kg)	1995-02-19	Serbia
F	21	Spencer Jones	6 ft 7 in (2.01 m)	225 lb (102 kg)	2001-06-14	Stanford
G	5	Tyus Jones	6 ft 1 in (1.85 m)	196 lb (89 kg)	1996-05-10	Duke
G	27	Jamal Murray	6 ft 4 in (1.93 m)	215 lb (98 kg)	1997-02-23	Kentucky
G	9	Ryan Nembhard (TW)	5 ft 11 in (1.80 m)	180 lb (82 kg)	2003-03-10	Gonzaga
F/C	22	Zeke Nnaji	6 ft 10 in (2.08 m)	240 lb (109 kg)	2001-01-09	Arizona
G	1	Julian Strawther (injured)	6 ft 6 in (1.98 m)	205 lb (93 kg)	2002-04-18	Gonzaga
F	00	Cam Whitmore (TW)	6 ft 6 in (1.98 m)	230 lb (104 kg)	2004-07-08	Villanova

Coaches
Head coach
- David Adelman
Assistant(s)
- J. J. Barea
- John Beckett
- Rodney Billups
- Chase Buford
- Jared Dudley
- Dave Joerger
- Mike Moser
- Andrew Munson
- Ognjen Stojaković
- Elvis Valcarcel

Legend
- (DP) Unsigned draft pick
- (FA) Free agent
- (S) Suspended
- (GL) On assignment to G League
- (TW) Two-way affiliate player
- Injured

Roster
Updated: October 17, 2026

=== Retained draft rights ===
The Nuggets hold the draft rights to the following unsigned draft picks who have been playing outside the NBA. A drafted player, either an international draftee or a college draftee who is not signed by the team that drafted him, is allowed to sign with any non-NBA team. In this case, the team retains the player's draft rights in the NBA until one year after the player's contract with the non-NBA team ends. This list includes draft rights that were acquired from trades with other teams.

Draft	Round	Pick	Player	Pos.	Nationality	Current team	Note(s)	Ref
2012	2	50	İzzet Türkyılmaz	F/C	Turkey	Balıkesir Büyükşehir Belediyespor (Turkey)		

=== Retired numbers ===
Denver Nuggets retired numbers
No.	Player	Position	Tenure	Date
2	Alex English	F	1980–1990	March 2, 1993
12	Fat Lever	G	1984–1990	December 2, 2017
33	David Thompson	F/G	1975–1982	November 7, 1992
40	Byron Beck	F/C	1967–1977	December 16, 1977
44	Dan Issel	C/F	1975–1985	April 5, 1985
55	Dikembe Mutombo	C	1991–1996	October 29, 2016
432 ^{1}	Doug Moe	Head coach	1980–1990	November 7, 2002

Notes:

- ^{1} Number represents his total number of regular season victories.
- The NBA retired Bill Russell's No. 6 for all its member teams on August 11, 2022.

=== Basketball Hall of Famers ===
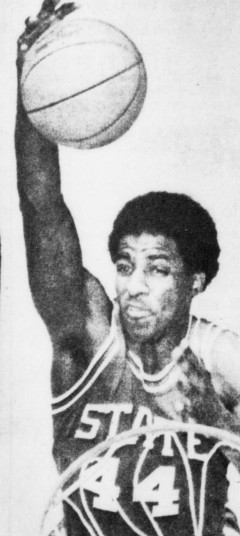
Hall of Famer David Thompson (1975–1982)

Denver Nuggets Hall of Famers
Players
No.	Name	Position	Tenure	Inducted
25; 44	Dan Issel ^{1}	C/F	1975–1985	1993
33	David Thompson	F/G	1975–1982	1996
2	Alex English	F	1980–1990	1997
8	Šarūnas Marčiulionis	G	1996–1997	2014
24	Spencer Haywood	F/C	1969–1970	2015
55	Dikembe Mutombo	C	1991–1996	2015
3	Allen Iverson	G	2006–2008	2016
30	George McGinnis	F	1978–1980	2017
11	Charlie Scott	G	1978–1980	2018
24	Bobby Jones	F	1974–1978	2019
10	Tim Hardaway	G	2002	2022
6	Walter Davis	G/F	1988–1991; 1991–1992	2024
1; 4; 7	Chauncey Billups	G	1999–2000; 2008–2011	2024
15	Carmelo Anthony ^{4}	F	2003–2011	2025
Coaches
Name		Position	Tenure	Inducted
Alex Hannum		Head coach	1971–1974	1998
11	Larry Brown ^{3}	Head coach	1974–1979	2002
John McLendon ^{2}		Head coach	1969	2016
George Karl		Head coach	2005–2013	2022
Contributors
Name		Position	Tenure	Inducted
John McLendon ^{2}		Head coach	1969	1979
Mike D'Antoni ^{5}		Assistant coach Head coach	1997–1998; 1999	2026

Notes:

- ^{1} He also coached the team in 1992–1994 and 1999–2001.
- ^{2} In total, McLendon was inducted into the Hall of Fame three times – as contributor, as coach and as a member of the 1957–1959 Tennessee A&I teams.
- ^{3} He also played for the team in 1971–1972.
- ^{4} In total, Anthony was inducted into the Hall of Fame twice – as player and as a member of the 2008 Olympic team.
- ^{5} In total, D'Antoni was inducted into the Hall of Fame twice – as contributor and as a member of the 2008 Olympic team.

=== FIBA Hall of Famers ===
Denver Nuggets Hall of Famers
Players
No.	Name	Position	Tenure	Inducted
8	Šarūnas Marčiulionis	G	1996–1997	2015

== Franchise records ==
Preceded by Golden State Warriors	NBA champions 2022–23	Succeeded by Boston Celtics
