= Mizzou Arena =

Indoor arena on the campus of the University of Missouri

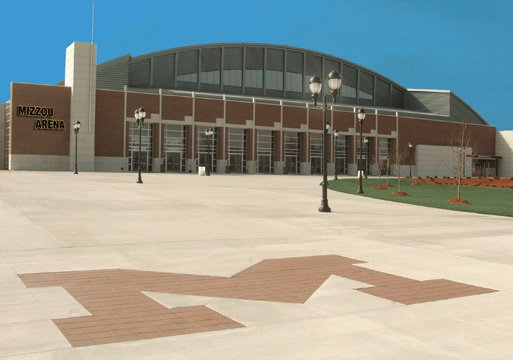
- Interactive map of Mizzou Arena
- Former names: Paige Sports Arena (October–November 2004; three regular season games)
- Location: One Champions Drive; Columbia, Missouri 65211
- Coordinates: 38.93237°N 92.33303°W
- Owner: University of Missouri
- Operator: University of Missouri
- Capacity: 15,061 (2004–present)
- Surface: Hardwood
- Public transit: Go COMO

Construction
- Groundbreaking: September 21, 2002
- Opened: October 13, 2004
- Cost: $75 million ($128 million in 2025 dollars)
- Architects: CDFM2; HOK Sport (now Populous)
- Structural engineer: Walter P Moore
- Services engineers: M-E Engineers, Inc.
- General contractor: J.E. Dunn Construction Group

Tenants
- Missouri Tigers (men's & women's basketball and gymnastics)

Mizzou Arena is an indoor arena located on the campus of the University of Missouri in Columbia, Missouri. Home to the school's men's and women's basketball teams as well as Mizzou gymnastics, the facility opened in November 2004 in addition to the Hearnes Center (which still hosts many other indoor events) as the school's flagship indoor sports facility. The arena also serves as the Columbia-Jefferson City market's venue for well-known 'arena' acts such as Rascal Flatts, Luke Bryan and the Eagles. The arched-roof building seats 15,061, and is located just south of Hearnes and Memorial Stadium. The arena is host to Missouri State High School Activities Association championships for boys and girls basketball, as well as wrestling. It is also set to become the host of the Missouri FFA State Convention in the coming years which is currently held at the Hearnes Center. Mizzou arena was originally known as Paige Sports Arena.

== About the arena ==
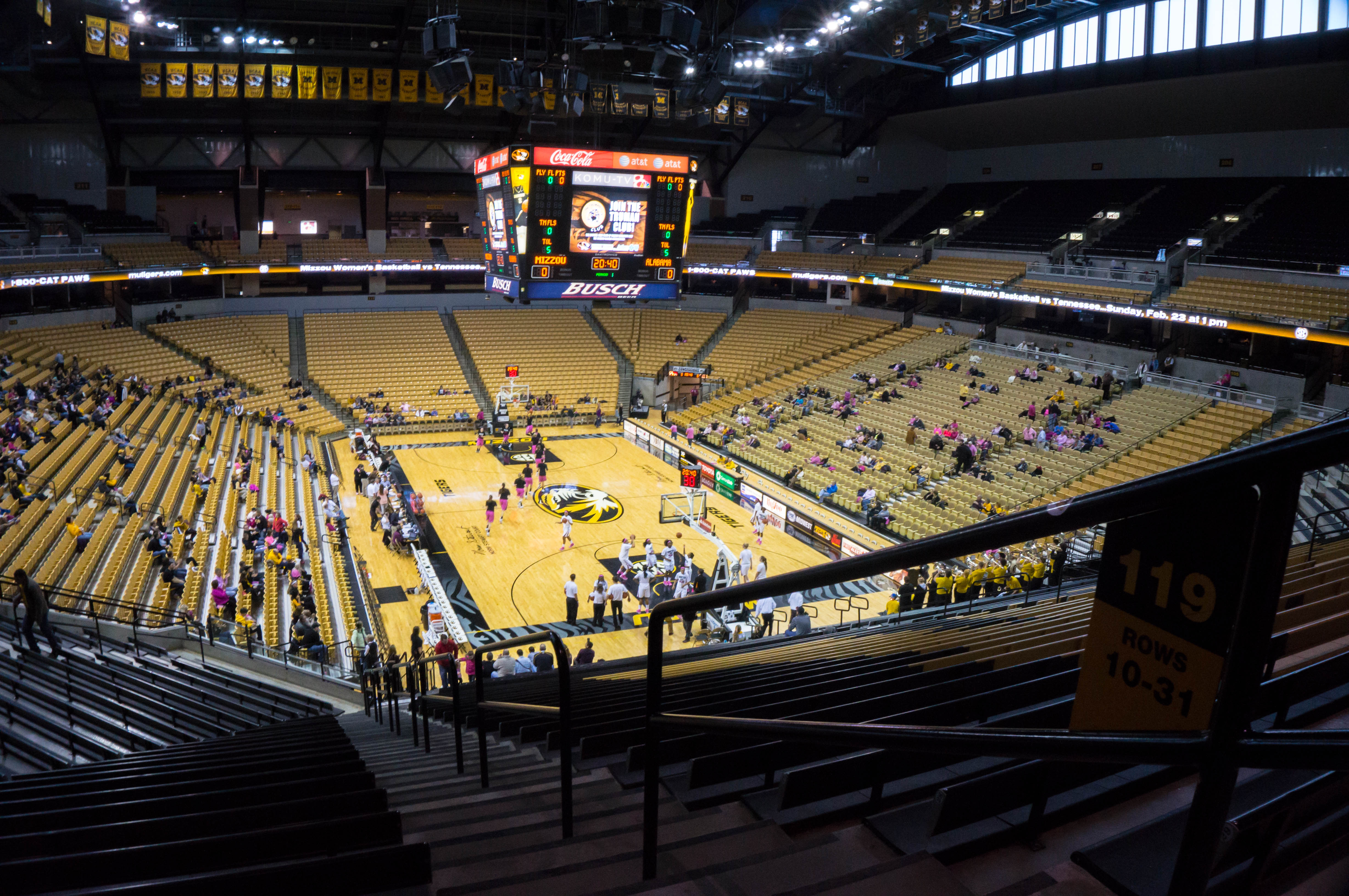
Mizzou Arena from the Northwest side in 2014

Mizzou Arena also includes offices for the Men's and Women's basketball programs, the Athletic Administration and Mizzou Arena's Building Operations. For the basketball programs the arena also offers locker rooms, a 24-hour practice gym, weight and training facilities including a hydrotherapy pool, video classrooms with audio and video editing capabilities, and an academic study center.

Missouri basketball coach from 1967 to 1999, Norm Stewart, is the namesake of the arena's playing court.

== History ==
After protracted negotiations, a third of the venue's $75 million cost was donated by Walmart heiress Nancy Walton Laurie and her husband Bill. It was initially named Paige Sports Arena after their daughter (who attended the University of Southern California rather than Mizzou, to much alumni and student criticism regarding the name), but the Lauries gave up their naming rights due to a term paper scandal involving that daughter shortly after the arena's dedication. The name of the arena's playing surface, Norm Stewart Court (in honor of Mizzou's longtime men's coach), was carried over from the basketball team's previous home at the Hearnes Center with the arena's opening in 2004.

In September 2014, the university announced renovations to the arena including new scoreboard infrastructure, improvements to the facility's entryway and upgrades to the team's locker room coming from a $1.5 million donation.

In June 2017, a former Mizzou athletics staffer was arrested on two felony charges after he allegedly drove a Volkswagen Passat through Mizzou Arena and onto Norm Stewart Court early that morning, causing an estimated $100,000 in damages.

Prior to the 2023-2024 basketball season, the gold seats inside the arena were removed and replaced with black seats.

Beginning with the 2026 season, the university announced that the Mizzou gymnastics program would move its home meets from Hearnes Center to Mizzou Arena. Athletic director Laird Veatch cited increased interest in the program following a third-place finish in the 2025 NCAA women's gymnastics tournament and the desire to provide an improved fan experience as the catalyst for the move.

== See also ==
- List of NCAA Division I basketball arenas
