= Josh Kroenke =

American businessman (born 1980)

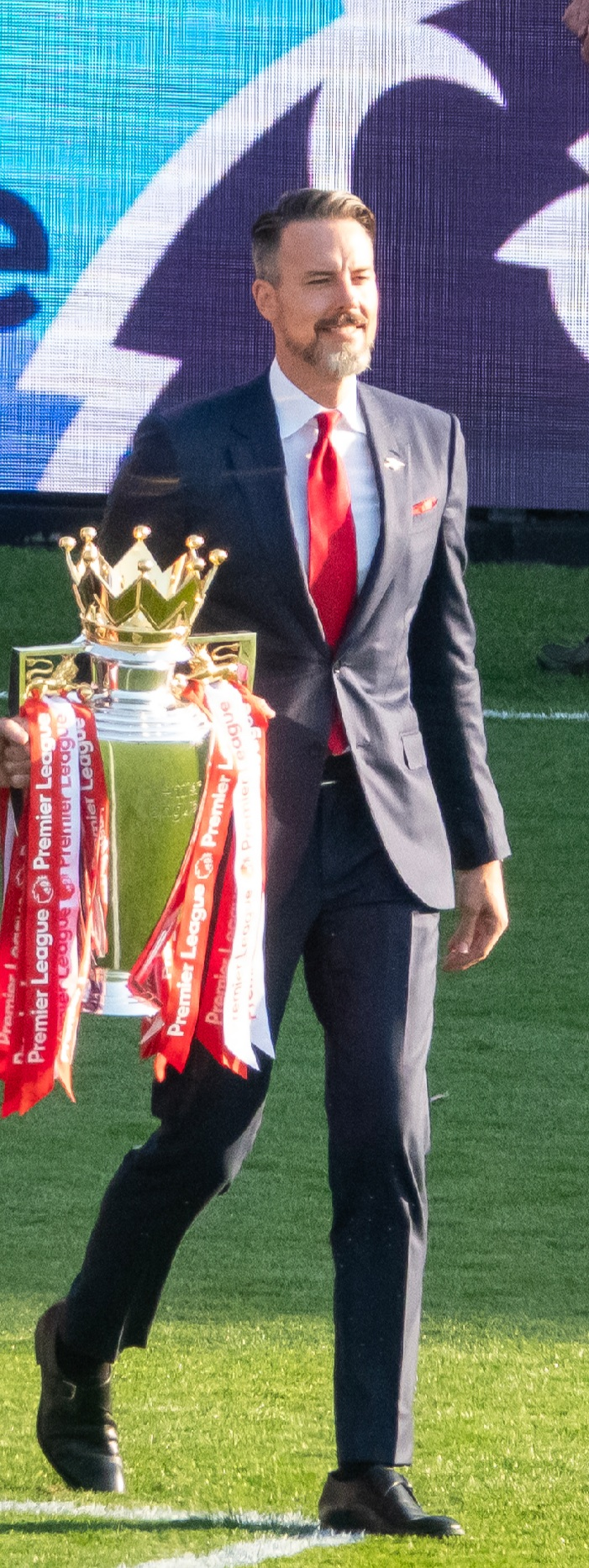
- Kroenke in 2026
- Born: Josh Walton Kroenke; May 7, 1980 (age 46); Columbia, Missouri, U.S.
- Education: University of Missouri
- Occupation: Businessman
- Known for: Co-chairman of Arsenal; Vice Chairman of Kroenke Sports & Entertainment; Alternate governor of Colorado Avalanche, Colorado Mammoth, Colorado Rapids, Denver Nuggets and Los Angeles Rams
- Parent(s): Stan Kroenke; Ann Walton Kroenke
- Relatives: Whitney Ann Kroenke (sister); James "Bud" Walton (maternal grandfather)

Josh Walton Kroenke (born May 7, 1980) is an American businessman. He is an heir to the Walmart family inheritance and to Kroenke Sports & Entertainment, his father's sports-media conglomerate. He is involved in running the Denver Nuggets basketball franchise, the Colorado Avalanche ice hockey franchise, the Los Angeles Rams pro-football franchise, the Colorado Rapids, and English football club Arsenal.

== Early life ==
Josh Kroenke was born on May 7, 1980. His father is Stan Kroenke and his mother, Ann Walton Kroenke. Through his mother, he is a member of the Walton family, one of the richest families in the world, who founded Walmart and still own a controlling interest. He has a sister, Whitney Ann Kroenke. He grew up in Columbia, Missouri, and attended Rock Bridge High School and New Hampton School.

He graduated from the University of Missouri, where he received a full basketball scholarship. While in college, Kroenke found himself involved in a scandal which led to the resignation of Larry Eustachy, the coach of the Iowa State basketball team. In 2003, Eustachy, a friend of Josh's father, attended a student party with Josh in Columbia, Missouri. Photos of Eustachy drinking with college students at the party later surfaced and led to his resignation from his position at Iowa State.

== Career ==
Kroenke serves as the President of both the National Basketball Association's Denver Nuggets and the National Hockey League's Colorado Avalanche as well as the Colorado Rapids of Major League Soccer .

In 2013, he was appointed by his father, the majority shareholder, to the board of English football club Arsenal as a non-executive director.

In April 2021, Arsenal was announced as a founding member of the European Super League, a closed competition without relegation or promotion, as in American professional-sports leagues. Arsenal and the other five English clubs involved backed out within days after a "fierce" backlash by fans and commentators. Following the "debacle," Arsenal fans called for the Kroenke family to sell the club, to which Kroenke responded that his "family have no intention of selling."

== Personal life ==
Kroenke resides in Denver, Colorado. Kroenke purchased an 1,885 square feet (175.1 m^{2}) condo for $1.4 million in 2007. Prior to his move to Denver, Kroenke lived in New York City. He and his sister, Whitney Ann Kroenke, purchased a 1,735 square feet (161.2 m^{2}) condominium, with a 400 square feet (37 m^{2}) roof deck, a small balcony and views of the Empire State Building for $2.7 million in 2005. They sold it in 2007 for $2.45 million—below both the initial listed price of $2.995 million and their final asking price of $2.55 million.
