= Ann Walton Kroenke =

American businesswoman, heiress to the Walmart fortune

- Born: December 18, 1948 (age 77)
- Education: Lincoln University
- Known for: Walton family fortune
- Spouse: Stan Kroenke (m. 1974)
- Children: Whitney Ann Kroenke; Josh Kroenke
- Parent(s): James "Bud" Walton; Audrey Walton
- Relatives: Nancy Walton Laurie (sister); Sam Walton (uncle); Rob Walton (cousin); John Walton (cousin); Jim Walton (cousin); Alice Walton (cousin)
- Awards: 2023 NBA Champion

Ann Walton Kroenke (born December 20, 1948) is an American billionaire. Heiress to the Walmart fortune, Ann and her sister, Nancy Walton Laurie, inherited stock from their father, Bud Walton, who was the brother and an early business partner of Walmart founder Sam Walton. She is the owner of the Denver Nuggets of the NBA and Colorado Avalanche of the NHL.

Her husband, Stan Kroenke, is the majority owner and CEO of the Los Angeles Rams (NFL), Arsenal (Premier League), Colorado Rapids (Major League Soccer), and Colorado Mammoth (National Lacrosse League).

As of 2024, her net worth is estimated to be around US$10 billion, according to Forbes.

== Personal life ==
Ann Walton Kroenke was born February 20, 1948, in Bentonville, Arkansas. Her father, Bud Walton, died in 1995 after helping his brother build Walmart. After his death, Ann inherited a large amount of stock in the company. Walton and her husband have been married since 1974 and have two children together.

== See also ==
- List of billionaires
- List of female billionaires

Sporting positions
Preceded by Stan Kroenke	Denver Nuggets principal owner 2016–present	Incumbent
Preceded by Stan Kroenke	Colorado Avalanche principal owner 2015–present	Incumbent
