= THF Realty =

Real estate investment firm

- Industry: Real estate
- Founded: (1991)
- Headquarters: St. Louis, Missouri, United States
- Key people: Stan Kroenke, Chairman
- Number of employees: 100
- Website: thfrealty.com

THF Realty is a national investor, developer, manager and owner of commercial real estate, including shopping centers and office buildings. THF stands for "To Have Fun." The company owns properties in almost half of the U.S. states. THF has a continuing relationship with Wal-Mart Stores, Inc.

== History ==
Chairman Stan Kroenke founded THF Realty in 1991. Company president Michael Staenberg co-founded the company.

In 2016, THF's portfolio was valued at more than $2 billion, including more than 100 projects totaling 20 million square feet, primarily in retail shopping centers.
