= Whitney Ann Kroenke =

American heiress

- Born: September 29, 1977 (age 48); Columbia, Missouri, U.S.
- Education: Northwestern University (BS)
- Occupation: Film producer
- Spouse: Nyck Silverstein
- Parent(s): Stan Kroenke; Ann Walton Kroenke
- Relatives: Josh Kroenke (Brother); James "Bud" Walton (maternal grandfather)

Whitney Ann Kroenke (born September 29, 1977) is an American heiress and film producer.

== Early life ==
Whitney Ann Kroenke was born on September 29, 1977. Her father is Stan Kroenke and her mother is Ann Walton Kroenke. Through her mother, she is a member of the Walton family. She has a brother, Josh Kroenke. She graduated from Northwestern University, where she received a Bachelor of Science in Speech with a Major in Theatre.

== Career ==
She worked as a choreographer, dancer, and actress for I Sing and the London production of Romeo & Juliet directed by Daniel Kramer. She has also produced several documentaries and the narrative feature The Power of Few.

A philanthropist, she is the co-founder of the Playing for Change Movement, where she serves as executive director.

In 2014, she co-founded Nine Banded Whiskey in Austin, Texas.

== Filmography ==
=== As a producer ===
- The Sound of Freedom (2023 film)
- The Black Jacket
- The Power of Few
- ReGeneration
- Playing for Change: Peace Through Music
