= Bud Walton =

American businessman

James "Bud" Walton
- Born: James Lawrence Walton; December 20, 1921; Kingfisher, Oklahoma, U.S.
- Died: March 21, 1995 (aged 73); Miami, Florida, U.S.
- Other name: Bud Walton
- Occupation: Executive
- Known for: Executive of Walmart
- Children: Ann Walton Kroenke; Nancy Walton Laurie
- Relatives: Sam Walton (brother); Whitney Ann Kroenke (granddaughter); Josh Kroenke (grandson)
- Military career
- Allegiance: United States
- Branch: United States Navy
- Rank: Pilot
- Conflicts: World War II

James Lawrence "Bud" Walton (December 20, 1921 – March 21, 1995) was the brother of Sam Walton and a Walmart businessman.

== Biography ==
=== Early life ===
Walton was born to Thomas Gibson Walton and Nancy "Nannie" Lee Lawrence Walton on December 20, 1921, in Kingfisher, Oklahoma. His father worked as a farm appraiser and mortgage agent. The family moved often because of Thomas Walton's job. When he was two years old, his family moved from Oklahoma to Springfield, Missouri. The Walton family later lived in Marshall, Shelbina, and Columbia, Missouri.

As children, the boys worked on the family's farm. Bud Walton delivered newspapers, worked as a lifeguard, and did yard work. He attended David H. Hickman High School in Columbia, Missouri, where he played varsity basketball and was elected senior class president.

After graduation, he attended Wentworth Military Academy in Lexington, Missouri. He served as a Navy pilot in World War II. While undergoing flight training, Bud met and married his wife, Audrey. They had two daughters, Ann and Nancy.

=== Career ===
Bud and his brother, Sam, began their career in the retail industry working in the Ben Franklin Stores, a franchised unit of Butler Brothers of Chicago.

Wal-Mart Stores Inc. opened its first Sam's Club – named for Sam Walton – on April 7, 1983, in Midwest City, Oklahoma.

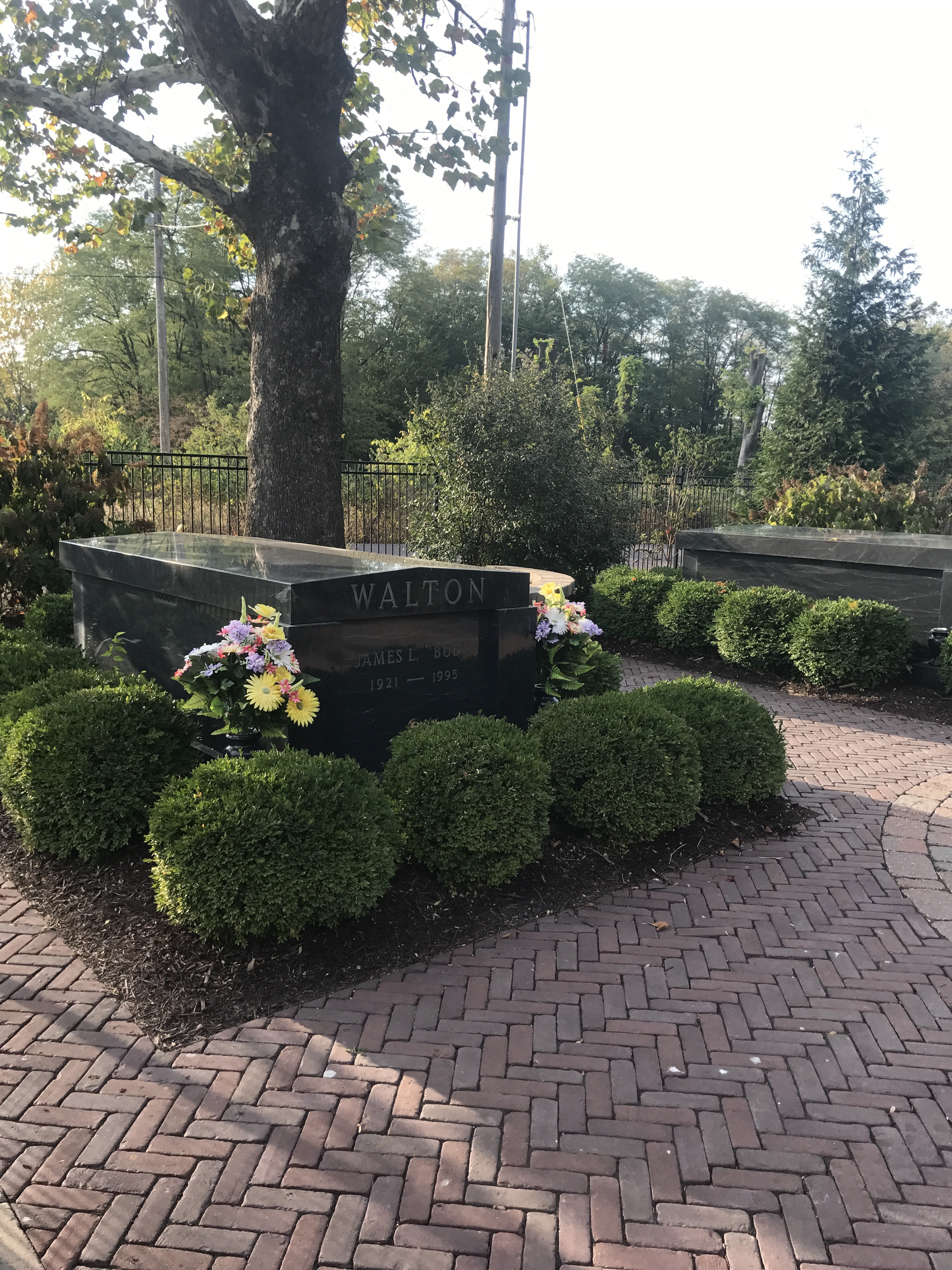
Tomb of James Bud Walton in Memorial Park Cemetery

Together, the Walton brothers donated $150,000 to build a new home for the Columbia Chamber of Commerce and Columbia Convention and Visitors Bureau in Columbia, Missouri. The building was named the Thomas G. Walton Building in honor of their father.

Bud Walton donated $15 million for the construction of a basketball arena at the University of Arkansas in Fayetteville, named Bud Walton Arena in his honor. College of the Ozarks in Point Lookout, Missouri, is home to the James L. "Bud" Walton Chair of Retailing, named in honor of his support.

=== Death ===
Walton died following surgery for an aneurysm in Miami, Florida, on March 21, 1995, at the age of 73. He is buried in Memorial Park Cemetery in Columbia, Missouri.

== See also ==
- Walton family
