= Nancy Walton Laurie =

American heir to the Walmart fortune (born 1951)

- Born: May 15, 1951 (age 75)
- Education: University of Memphis
- Known for: Walton family fortune
- Spouse: Bill Laurie
- Children: 1
- Parent(s): James "Bud" Walton; Audrey Walton
- Relatives: Ann Walton Kroenke (sister)

Nancy Walton Laurie (born May 15, 1951) is an American billionaire businesswoman who is an heir to the Walmart fortune.

== Early life ==
Walton was born on May 15, 1951. She is the younger daughter of Bud Walton, the brother and business partner of Walmart founder Sam Walton. She grew up in Versailles, Missouri, where she met future husband Bill Laurie. Upon Bud's death, she and her sister Ann Walton Kroenke inherited a stake in Walmart that made them both billionaires. As of February 2026, Forbes estimates her net worth to be $US20.8 billion.

== Philanthropy ==
With her husband, she donated US$25 million to the University of Missouri for the construction of a new sports arena for the Missouri Tigers in 2001, to be named after their daughter Paige Laurie, who did not attend the university. However, it was revealed shortly after the 2004–05 basketball season started that Paige Laurie paid her USC roommate to do much of her homework for her, even after the roommate left the university due to financial issues. The Lauries gave up the naming rights on November 23, 2004, to the university, which then renamed the arena with the university's common nickname "Mizzou" and removed all mention of Elizabeth Paige Laurie from the venue, beyond the bare minimum required to acknowledge the Lauries' gift. They have also endowed the E. Paige Laurie Professorship for the Equine Center at the College of Veterinary Medicine at the University of Missouri. According to The Los Angeles Times, they have also made charitable gifts for a cancer research center, a shelter for abused women, and a children's hospital.

Laurie is the founder of the Nancy Walton Laurie Leadership Institute at the Chi Omega sorority. She was the president and founder of a New York City dance company called the Cedar Lake Contemporary Ballet, which closed in 2015. She is the owner of the Columbia Performing Arts Centre, a dance studio located in Columbia, Missouri.

== Personal life ==
Laurie married Bill Laurie, after a courtship that occurred when they both attended the University of Memphis (then known as Memphis State University).

The couple resides primarily in the Las Vegas Valley in Henderson, Nevada. They also have homes in Bel Air, California, and in Columbia, Missouri, where they own an equine farm where they breed appaloosa horses. In January 2015, she filed a lawsuit through her company, LW Partnership, against Mohamed Hadid, a property developer who is building a retaining wall next to the Bel Air house, alleging Hadid damaged the roots of a eucalyptus tree. According to the Center for Investigative Reporting, Walton uses "at least 2.3 million gallons (8.7 million liters) per year" to water her Bel Air estate.

Laurie owns a superyacht called Kaos, on which she cruised to the UK in May 2023. In July 2023, Kaos was sprayed with paint by members of Futuro Vegetal a Spanish climate movement in the port of Ibiza. The members of Futuro Vegetal showed a poster saying "You consume - others suffer".

In July 2026, she and her husband announced a bid to acquire an NBA franchise in Las Vegas.
