= List of New York Islanders draft picks =

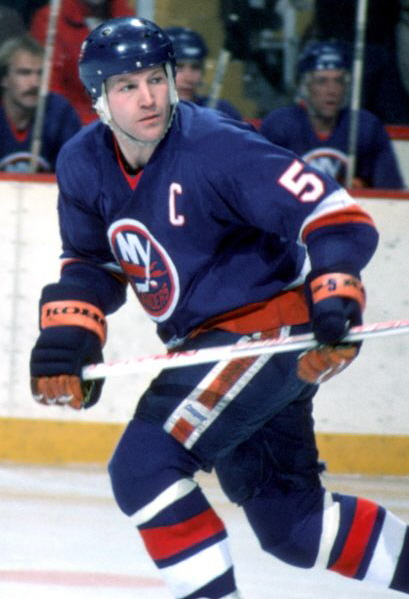
Denis Potvin was selected by the Islanders first overall in the 1973 draft.

The New York Islanders are a professional ice hockey team based on Long Island. They are members of the Metropolitan Division in the Eastern Conference of the National Hockey League (NHL). The franchise has been a part of the NHL since their inception in 1972, which is also the first year they participated in the annual NHL entry draft, where participating teams select newly eligible players in a predetermined order. They have chosen 459 players over 52 drafts, including the nine Supplemental Drafts, which took place in the NHL from 1986 to 1994 for players in American colleges.

The NHL Entry Draft eligibility requires players to have turned 18 years old by September 15 in the year the draft is held, excluding players older than 20 years old before December 31 of that same year, the latter not applying to non-North American players. The draft order is determined by the previous season's order of finish: non-playoff teams draft first in order of placement in the standings, followed by teams that competed in the post-season whose order is determined by the Stanley Cup playoffs results. Once the regular season is over, a weighted lottery is held for the 14 teams who miss the playoffs, giving teams the opportunity to move up to a higher pick including the first overall selection. From 1995 to 2012, a team that won the lottery could only move up a maximum of four picks, preventing some teams from winning the top selection regardless of winning the lottery. During that time, the Islanders won the lottery twice, receiving the top selection both times (2000 and 2009). The team finished last in the league standings in the 2000–01 season, but picked second in the draft after the Atlanta Thrashers won the lottery.

The Islanders have selected first overall five times, including their first season participating in the draft (1972) when they selected Billy Harris, as well as 1973 (Denis Potvin), 2000 (Rick DiPietro), 2009 (John Tavares), and 2025 (Matthew Schaefer). Harris played with the Islanders for eight seasons before being traded to the Los Angeles Kings, while Potvin and DiPietro spent their entire NHL careers with the Islanders. Tavares was with the team from 2009 when he was drafted and served as their team captain until 2018 when he signed with the Toronto Maple Leafs during Unrestricted Free Agency. Currently Anders Lee serves as the captain. Only three players, Potvin, Bryan Trottier (1974) and Josh Bailey (2008), have played over 1000 games with the Islanders, though eight others have played at least 1000 games in the NHL. Five draft picks have gone on to be inducted into the Hockey Hall of Fame: Potvin, Clark Gillies (1974), Trottier, Mike Bossy (1977), and Pat LaFontaine (1983). All, except LaFontaine, have had their uniform number retired by the team.

== Key ==
Spent entire NHL career with the Islanders
(†) Inducted into the Hockey Hall of Fame
(‡) Number retired by the Islanders

General terms and abbreviations
Term or abbreviation	Definition
Draft	The year that the player was selected
Round	The round of the draft in which the player was selected
Pick	The overall position in the draft at which the player was selected
S	Supplemental draft selection

Position abbreviations
Abbreviation	Definition
G	Goaltender
D	Defenseman
LW	Left wing
C	Center
RW	Right wing
F	Forward

Abbreviations for statistical columns
Abbreviation	Definition
Pos	Position
GP	Games played
G	Goals
A	Assists
Pts	Points
PIM	Penalties in minutes
W	Wins
L	Losses
T	Ties
OT	Overtime/shootout losses
GAA	Goals against average
—	Does not apply

== Draft picks ==
Statistics are complete as of the 2025–26 NHL season and show each player's career regular season totals in the NHL. Wins, losses, ties, overtime losses and goals against average apply to goaltenders and are used only for players at that position.

List of all players drafted by the New York Islanders and their statistical accomplishments
Draft	Round	Pick	Player	Nationality	Pos	GP	G	A	Pts	PIM	W	L	T	OT	GAA
1972	1	1	Billy Harris	Canada	RW	897	231	327	558	394	—	—	—	—	—
1972	2	17	Lorne Henning	Canada	C	543	73	111	184	102	—	—	—	—	—
1972	3	33	Bob Nystrom‡	Sweden	RW	900	235	278	513	1248	—	—	—	—	—
1972	4	49	Ron Smith	Canada	D	11	1	1	2	14	—	—	—	—	—
1972	5	65	Richard Grenier	Canada	C	10	1	1	2	2	—	—	—	—	—
1972	6	81	Derek Black	Canada	LW	—	—	—	—	—	—	—	—	—	—
1972	7	97	Richard Brodeur	Canada	G	385	0	8	8	26	131	175	62	—	3.85
1972	7	101	Don McLaughlin	Canada	LW	—	—	—	—	—	—	—	—	—	—
1972	8	113	Derek Kuntz	Canada	LW	—	—	—	—	—	—	—	—	—	—
1972	8	117	Rene Levasseur	Canada	D	—	—	—	—	—	—	—	—	—	—
1972	9	129	Yvon Rolando	Canada	RW	—	—	—	—	—	—	—	—	—	—
1972	9	133	Bill Ennos	Canada	RW	—	—	—	—	—	—	—	—	—	—
1972	10	144	Garry Howatt	Canada	LW	720	112	156	268	1836	—	—	—	—	—
1972	10	146	Rene Lambert	Canada	LW	—	—	—	—	—	—	—	—	—	—
1973	1	1	Denis Potvin†‡	Canada	D	1060	310	742	1052	1356	—	—	—	—	—
1973	3	33	Dave Lewis	Canada	D	1008	36	188	224	953	—	—	—	—	—
1973	4	49	Andre St. Laurent	Canada	C	644	129	187	316	749	—	—	—	—	—
1973	5	65	Ron Kennedy	Canada	RW	—	—	—	—	—	—	—	—	—	—
1973	6	81	Keith Smith	Canada	D	—	—	—	—	—	—	—	—	—	—
1973	7	97	Don Cutts	Canada	G	6	0	0	0	6	1	2	1	—	3.57
1973	7	110	Denis Andersen	Canada	D	—	—	—	—	—	—	—	—	—	—
1973	8	113	Mike Kennedy	Canada	RW	—	—	—	—	—	—	—	—	—	—
1973	8	126	Denis Desgagnes	Canada	C	—	—	—	—	—	—	—	—	—	—
1973	9	129	Bob Lorimer	Canada	D	529	22	90	112	431	—	—	—	—	—
1974	1	4	Clark Gillies†‡	Canada	F	958	319	378	697	1023	—	—	—	—	—
1974	2	22	Bryan Trottier†‡	Canada	C	1279	524	901	1425	912	—	—	—	—	—
1974	3	40	Brad Anderson	Canada	C	—	—	—	—	—	—	—	—	—	—
1974	5	76	Carlo Torresan	Canada	D	—	—	—	—	—	—	—	—	—	—
1974	6	94	Sid Prysunka	Canada	LW	—	—	—	—	—	—	—	—	—	—
1974	7	112	Dave Langevin	United States	D	513	12	107	119	530	—	—	—	—	—
1974	8	129	Dave Inkpen	Canada	D	—	—	—	—	—	—	—	—	—	—
1974	9	146	Jim Foubister	Canada	G	—	—	—	—	—	—	—	—	—	—
1974	10	163	Bob Ferguson	Canada	C	—	—	—	—	—	—	—	—	—	—
1974	11	178	Murray Fleck	Canada	D	—	—	—	—	—	—	—	—	—	—
1974	12	192	Dave Rooke	Canada	D	—	—	—	—	—	—	—	—	—	—
1974	13	204	Neil Smith	Canada	D	—	—	—	—	—	—	—	—	—	—
1974	14	214	Stefan Persson	Sweden	D	622	52	317	369	574	—	—	—	—	—
1974	15	221	Dave Otness	United States	C	—	—	—	—	—	—	—	—	—	—
1974	16	226	Bob Murray	Canada	D	—	—	—	—	—	—	—	—	—	—
1974	17	229	Mike Dibble	United States	G	—	—	—	—	—	—	—	—	—	—
1974	18	232	Brian Bye	Canada	C	—	—	—	—	—	—	—	—	—	—
1974	19	235	Martti Jarkko	Finland	F	—	—	—	—	—	—	—	—	—	—
1974	20	238	Ron Phillips	Canada	D	—	—	—	—	—	—	—	—	—	—
1975	1	11	Pat Price	Canada	D	726	43	218	261	1456	—	—	—	—	—
1975	2	29	Dave Salvian	Canada	LW	1	0	1	1	2	—	—	—	—	—
1975	3	47	Joe Fortunato	Canada	LW	—	—	—	—	—	—	—	—	—	—
1975	4	65	Andre LePage	Canada	G	—	—	—	—	—	—	—	—	—	—
1975	5	83	Denny McLean	Canada	LW	—	—	—	—	—	—	—	—	—	—
1975	6	101	Mike Sleep	Canada	RW	—	—	—	—	—	—	—	—	—	—
1975	7	119	Richie Hansen	United States	C	20	2	8	10	4	—	—	—	—	—
1975	8	137	Bob Sunderland	Canada	G	—	—	—	—	—	—	—	—	—	—
1975	9	153	Dan Blair	Canada	RW	—	—	—	—	—	—	—	—	—	—
1975	10	168	Joey Girardin	Canada	D	—	—	—	—	—	—	—	—	—	—
1975	11	183	Geoff Green	Canada	F	—	—	—	—	—	—	—	—	—	—
1975	12	194	Kari Makkonen	Finland	F	9	2	2	4	0	—	—	—	—	—
1976	1	14	Alex McKendry	Canada	F	46	3	6	9	21	—	—	—	—	—
1976	2	32	Mike Kaszycki	Canada	F	226	42	80	122	108	—	—	—	—	—
1976	3	50	Garth MacGuigan	Canada	C	5	0	1	1	2	—	—	—	—	—
1976	4	68	Ken Morrow	United States	D	550	17	88	105	309	—	—	—	—	—
1976	5	86	Mike Hordy	Canada	D	11	0	0	0	7	—	—	—	—	—
1976	6	104	Yvon Vautour	Canada	F	204	26	33	59	401	—	—	—	—	—
1977	1	15	Mike Bossy†‡	Canada	RW	752	573	553	1126	210	—	—	—	—	—
1977	2	33	John Tonelli‡	Canada	C	1028	325	511	836	911	—	—	—	—	—
1977	3	50	Hector Marini	Canada	RW	154	27	46	73	246	—	—	—	—	—
1977	3	51	Bruce Andres	Canada	RW	—	—	—	—	—	—	—	—	—	—
1977	4	69	Steve Stoyanovich	Canada	LW	23	3	5	8	11	—	—	—	—	—
1977	5	87	Markus Mattsson	Finland	G	92	0	3	3	6	21	46	14	—	4.00
1977	6	105	Steve Letzgus	United States	D	—	—	—	—	—	—	—	—	—	—
1977	7	121	Harald Luckner	Sweden	LW	—	—	—	—	—	—	—	—	—	—
1978	1	15	Steve Tambellini	Canada	C	553	160	150	310	105	—	—	—	—	—
1978	2	34	Randy Johnston	Canada	D	4	0	0	0	4	—	—	—	—	—
1978	3	51	Dwayne Lowdermilk	Canada	D	2	0	1	1	2	—	—	—	—	—
1978	5	84	Greg Hay	United States	RW	—	—	—	—	—	—	—	—	—	—
1978	6	101	Kelly Davis	Canada	D	—	—	—	—	—	—	—	—	—	—
1978	7	118	Rick Pepin	Canada	RW	—	—	—	—	—	—	—	—	—	—
1978	8	135	Dave Cameron	Canada	C	168	25	28	53	238	—	—	—	—	—
1978	9	152	Paul Joswiak	United States	G	—	—	—	—	—	—	—	—	—	—
1978	10	169	Scott Cameron	Canada	D	—	—	—	—	—	—	—	—	—	—
1978	11	184	Christer Lowdahl	Sweden	C	—	—	—	—	—	—	—	—	—	—
1978	12	199	Gunnar Persson	Sweden	C	—	—	—	—	—	—	—	—	—	—
1979	1	17	Duane Sutter	Canada	RW	731	139	203	342	1333	—	—	—	—	—
1979	2	25	Tomas Jonsson	Sweden	D	552	85	259	344	482	—	—	—	—	—
1979	2	38	Billy Carroll	Canada	C	322	30	54	84	113	—	—	—	—	—
1979	3	59	Rollie Melanson	Canada	G	291	0	12	12	109	129	106	33	—	3.44
1979	4	80	Tim Lockridge	Canada	D	—	—	—	—	—	—	—	—	—	—
1979	5	101	Glen Duncan	Canada	RW	—	—	—	—	—	—	—	—	—	—
1979	6	122	John Gibb	Canada	D	—	—	—	—	—	—	—	—	—	—
1980	1	17	Brent Sutter	Canada	C	1111	363	466	829	1054	—	—	—	—	—
1980	2	38	Kelly Hrudey	Canada	G	677	0	16	16	173	271	265	88	—	3.43
1980	3	59	Dave Simpson	Canada	C	—	—	—	—	—	—	—	—	—	—
1980	4	68	Monty Trottier	United States	C	—	—	—	—	—	—	—	—	—	—
1980	4	80	Greg Gilbert	Canada	F	837	150	228	378	576	—	—	—	—	—
1980	5	101	Ken Leiter	United States	D	143	14	36	50	62	—	—	—	—	—
1980	6	122	Dan Revell	Canada	RW	—	—	—	—	—	—	—	—	—	—
1980	7	143	Mark Hamway	United States	RW	53	5	13	18	9	—	—	—	—	—
1980	8	164	Morey Gare	Canada	RW	—	—	—	—	—	—	—	—	—	—
1980	9	185	Peter Steblyk	Canada	D	—	—	—	—	—	—	—	—	—	—
1980	10	206	Glenn Johannesen	Canada	D	2	0	0	0	0	—	—	—	—	—
1981	1	21	Paul Boutilier	Canada	D	288	27	83	110	358	—	—	—	—	—
1981	2	42	Gord Dineen	Canada	D	528	16	90	106	695	—	—	—	—	—
1981	3	57	Ron Handy	Canada	LW	14	0	3	3	0	—	—	—	—	—
1981	3	63	Neal Coulter	Canada	RW	26	5	5	10	11	—	—	—	—	—
1981	4	84	Todd Lumbard	Canada	G	—	—	—	—	—	—	—	—	—	—
1981	5	94	Jacques Sylvestre	Canada	C	—	—	—	—	—	—	—	—	—	—
1981	6	126	Chuck Brimmer	Canada	C	—	—	—	—	—	—	—	—	—	—
1981	7	147	Teppo Virta	Finland	C	—	—	—	—	—	—	—	—	—	—
1981	8	168	Bill Dowd	Canada	D	—	—	—	—	—	—	—	—	—	—
1981	9	189	Scott MacLellan	Canada	D	—	—	—	—	—	—	—	—	—	—
1981	10	210	Dave Randerson	Canada	RW	—	—	—	—	—	—	—	—	—	—
1982	1	21	Patrick Flatley	Canada	RW	780	170	340	510	686	—	—	—	—	—
1982	2	42	Vern Smith	Canada	D	1	0	0	0	0	—	—	—	—	—
1982	3	63	Garry Lacey	Canada	LW	—	—	—	—	—	—	—	—	—	—
1982	4	84	Alan Kerr	Canada	RW	391	72	94	166	826	—	—	—	—	—
1982	5	105	Rene Breton	Canada	LW	—	—	—	—	—	—	—	—	—	—
1982	6	126	Roger Kortko	Canada	C	79	7	17	24	28	—	—	—	—	—
1982	7	147	John Tiano	United States	C	—	—	—	—	—	—	—	—	—	—
1982	8	168	Todd Okerlund	United States	D	4	0	0	0	2	—	—	—	—	—
1982	9	189	Gordon Paddock	Canada	D	—	—	—	—	—	—	—	—	—	—
1982	10	210	Eric Faust	Canada	D	—	—	—	—	—	—	—	—	—	—
1982	11	231	Pat Goff	United States	D	—	—	—	—	—	—	—	—	—	—
1982	12	252	Jim Koudys	Canada	D	—	—	—	—	—	—	—	—	—	—
1983	1	3	Pat LaFontaine†	United States	C	865	468	545	1013	552	—	—	—	—	—
1983	1	16	Gerald Diduck	Canada	D	932	56	156	212	1612	—	—	—	—	—
1983	2	37	Garnet McKechney	Canada	RW	—	—	—	—	—	—	—	—	—	—
1983	3	57	Mike Neill	Canada	D	—	—	—	—	—	—	—	—	—	—
1983	4	65	Mikko Makela	Finland	RW	423	118	147	265	139	—	—	—	—	—
1983	5	84	Bob Caulfield	United States	RW	—	—	—	—	—	—	—	—	—	—
1983	5	97	Rob Viglasi	Canada	D	—	—	—	—	—	—	—	—	—	—
1983	6	117	Darin Illikainen	United States	LW	—	—	—	—	—	—	—	—	—	—
1983	7	137	Jim Sprenger	United States	D	—	—	—	—	—	—	—	—	—	—
1983	8	157	Dale Henry	Canada	LW	132	13	26	39	263	—	—	—	—	—
1983	9	177	Kevin Vescio	Canada	D	—	—	—	—	—	—	—	—	—	—
1983	10	197	Dave Shellington	Canada	LW	—	—	—	—	—	—	—	—	—	—
1983	11	217	John Bjorkman	United States	C	—	—	—	—	—	—	—	—	—	—
1983	12	237	Peter McGeough	United States	LW	—	—	—	—	—	—	—	—	—	—
1984	1	20	Duncan MacPherson	Canada	D	—	—	—	—	—	—	—	—	—	—
1984	2	41	Bruce Melanson	Canada	RW	—	—	—	—	—	—	—	—	—	—
1984	3	62	Jeff Norton	United States	D	799	52	332	384	615	—	—	—	—	—
1984	4	70	Doug Wieck	United States	LW	—	—	—	—	—	—	—	—	—	—
1984	4	83	Ari Haanpaa	Finland	RW	60	6	11	17	37	—	—	—	—	—
1984	5	104	Mike Murray	Canada	C	1	0	0	0	0	—	—	—	—	—
1984	6	125	Jim Wilharm	United States	D	—	—	—	—	—	—	—	—	—	—
1984	7	146	Kelly Murphy	Canada	D	—	—	—	—	—	—	—	—	—	—
1984	8	167	Franco de Santis	Canada	D	—	—	—	—	—	—	—	—	—	—
1984	9	187	Tom Warden	United Kingdom	LW	—	—	—	—	—	—	—	—	—	—
1984	10	208	David Volek	Czechoslovakia	LW	396	95	154	249	201	—	—	—	—	—
1984	11	228	Russ Becker	United States	D	—	—	—	—	—	—	—	—	—	—
1984	12	249	Allister Brown	Canada	D	—	—	—	—	—	—	—	—	—	—
1985	1	6	Brad Dalgarno	Canada	RW	321	49	71	120	332	—	—	—	—	—
1985	1	13	Derek King	Canada	LW	830	261	351	612	417	—	—	—	—	—
1985	2	34	Brad Lauer	Canada	RW	323	44	67	111	218	—	—	—	—	—
1985	3	55	Jeff Finley	Canada	D	708	13	70	83	457	—	—	—	—	—
1985	4	76	Kevin Herom	Canada	LW	—	—	—	—	—	—	—	—	—	—
1985	5	89	Tommy Hedlund	Sweden	D	—	—	—	—	—	—	—	—	—	—
1985	5	97	Jeff Sveen	Canada	C	—	—	—	—	—	—	—	—	—	—
1985	6	118	Rod Dallman	Canada	LW	6	1	0	1	26	—	—	—	—	—
1985	7	139	Kurt Lackton	Canada	RW	—	—	—	—	—	—	—	—	—	—
1985	8	160	Hank Lammens	Canada	D	27	1	2	3	22	—	—	—	—	—
1985	9	181	Rich Wiest	Canada	C	—	—	—	—	—	—	—	—	—	—
1985	10	202	Real Arsenault	Canada	LW	—	—	—	—	—	—	—	—	—	—
1985	11	223	Mike Volpe	Canada	G	—	—	—	—	—	—	—	—	—	—
1985	12	244	Tony Grenier	Canada	C	—	—	—	—	—	—	—	—	—	—
1986	1	17	Tom Fitzgerald	United States	RW	1097	139	190	329	776	—	—	—	—	—
1986	2	38	Dennis Vaske	United States	D	235	5	41	46	253	—	—	—	—	—
1986	3	59	Bill Berg	Canada	D	546	55	67	122	488	—	—	—	—	—
1986	4	80	Shawn Byram	Canada	LW	5	0	0	0	14	—	—	—	—	—
1986	5	101	Dean Sexsmith	Canada	C	—	—	—	—	—	—	—	—	—	—
1986	5	104	Todd McLellan	Canada	C	5	1	1	2	0	—	—	—	—	—
1986	6	122	Tony Schmalzbauer	Canada	D	—	—	—	—	—	—	—	—	—	—
1986	7	138	Will Andersen	Canada	D	—	—	—	—	—	—	—	—	—	—
1986	7	143	Rich Pilon	Canada	D	631	8	69	77	1745	—	—	—	—	—
1986	8	164	Peter Harris	United States	G	—	—	—	—	—	—	—	—	—	—
1986	9	185	Jeff Jablonski	United States	LW	—	—	—	—	—	—	—	—	—	—
1986	10	206	Kerry Clark	Canada	RW	—	—	—	—	—	—	—	—	—	—
1986	11	227	Dan Beaudette	United States	C	—	—	—	—	—	—	—	—	—	—
1986	12	248	Paul Thompson	Canada	D	—	—	—	—	—	—	—	—	—	—
1986	S	20	Gary Kruzich	United States	G	—	—	—	—	—	—	—	—	—	—
1987	1	13	Dean Chynoweth	Canada	D	241	4	18	22	667	—	—	—	—	—
1987	2	34	Jeff Hackett	Canada	G	500	0	9	9	62	166	244	56	—	2.90
1987	3	55	Dean Ewen	Canada	LW	—	—	—	—	—	—	—	—	—	—
1987	4	76	George Maneluk	Canada	G	4	0	0	0	2	1	1	0	—	6.43
1987	5	97	Petr Vlk	Czechoslovakia	LW	—	—	—	—	—	—	—	—	—	—
1987	6	118	Rob DiMaio	Canada	RW	894	106	171	277	840	—	—	—	—	—
1987	7	139	Knut Walbye	Norway	C	—	—	—	—	—	—	—	—	—	—
1987	8	160	Jeff Saterdalen	United States	C	—	—	—	—	—	—	—	—	—	—
1987	9	181	Shawn Howard	United States	C	—	—	—	—	—	—	—	—	—	—
1987	10	202	John Herlihy	United States	RW	—	—	—	—	—	—	—	—	—	—
1987	11	223	Michael Erickson	United States	D	—	—	—	—	—	—	—	—	—	—
1987	12	244	William Averill	United States	D	—	—	—	—	—	—	—	—	—	—
1987	S	14	Howie Vandermast	United States	D	—	—	—	—	—	—	—	—	—	—
1988	1	16	Kevin Cheveldayoff	Canada	D	—	—	—	—	—	—	—	—	—	—
1988	2	29	Wayne Doucet	Canada	LW	—	—	—	—	—	—	—	—	—	—
1988	2	37	Sean LeBrun	Canada	LW	—	—	—	—	—	—	—	—	—	—
1988	3	58	Danny Lorenz	Canada	G	8	0	0	0	0	1	5	0	—	4.20
1988	4	79	Andre Brassard	Canada	D	—	—	—	—	—	—	—	—	—	—
1988	5	100	Paul Rutherford	Canada	C	—	—	—	—	—	—	—	—	—	—
1988	6	111	Pavel Gross	Czechoslovakia	LW	—	—	—	—	—	—	—	—	—	—
1988	6	121	Jason Rathbone	United States	RW	—	—	—	—	—	—	—	—	—	—
1988	7	142	Yves Gaucher	Canada	LW	—	—	—	—	—	—	—	—	—	—
1988	8	163	Marty McInnis	United States	LW	796	170	250	420	330	—	—	—	—	—
1988	9	173	Shorty Forrest	United States	D	—	—	—	—	—	—	—	—	—	—
1988	9	184	Jeff Blumer	United States	RW	—	—	—	—	—	—	—	—	—	—
1988	10	205	Jeff Kampersal	United States	D	—	—	—	—	—	—	—	—	—	—
1988	11	226	Phillip Neururer	United States	D	—	—	—	—	—	—	—	—	—	—
1988	12	247	Joseph Capprini	United States	G	—	—	—	—	—	—	—	—	—	—
1988	S	21	Doug Melnyk	Canada	D	—	—	—	—	—	—	—	—	—	—
1989	1	2	Dave Chyzowski	Canada	LW	126	15	16	31	144	—	—	—	—	—
1989	2	23	Travis Green	Canada	C	970	193	262	455	764	—	—	—	—	—
1989	3	44	Jason Zent	United States	LW	27	3	3	6	13	—	—	—	—	—
1989	4	65	Brent Grieve	Canada	LW	97	20	16	36	87	—	—	—	—	—
1989	5	86	Jace Reed	United States	D	—	—	—	—	—	—	—	—	—	—
1989	5	90	Steve Young	Canada	RW	—	—	—	—	—	—	—	—	—	—
1989	5	99	Kevin O'Sullivan	United States	D	—	—	—	—	—	—	—	—	—	—
1989	7	128	Jon Larson	United States	D	—	—	—	—	—	—	—	—	—	—
1989	7	133	Brett Harkins	United States	LW	78	6	30	36	22	—	—	—	—	—
1989	8	149	Phil Huber	Canada	C	—	—	—	—	—	—	—	—	—	—
1989	9	170	Matt Robbins	United States	C	—	—	—	—	—	—	—	—	—	—
1989	10	191	Vladimir Malakhov	Soviet Union	D	712	86	260	346	697	—	—	—	—	—
1989	11	212	Kelly Ens	Canada	C	—	—	—	—	—	—	—	—	—	—
1989	12	233	Iain Fraser	Canada	C	94	23	23	46	31	—	—	—	—	—
1989	S	2	Rob Vanderydt	Canada	C	—	—	—	—	—	—	—	—	—	—
1989	S	7	Brad Mattson	United States	F	—	—	—	—	—	—	—	—	—	—
1990	1	6	Scott Scissons	Canada	C	2	0	0	0	0	—	—	—	—	—
1990	2	27	Chris Taylor	Canada	C	149	11	21	32	48	—	—	—	—	—
1990	3	48	Dan Plante	United States	RW	159	9	14	23	135	—	—	—	—	—
1990	5	90	Chris Marinucci	United States	C	13	1	4	5	2	—	—	—	—	—
1990	6	111	Joni Lehto	Finland	D	—	—	—	—	—	—	—	—	—	—
1990	7	132	Mike Guilbert	United States	D	—	—	—	—	—	—	—	—	—	—
1990	8	153	Sylvain Fleury	Canada	LW	—	—	—	—	—	—	—	—	—	—
1990	9	174	John Joyce	United States	C	—	—	—	—	—	—	—	—	—	—
1990	10	195	R. J. Enga	Canada	C	—	—	—	—	—	—	—	—	—	—
1990	11	216	Martin Lacroix	Canada	LW	—	—	—	—	—	—	—	—	—	—
1990	12	237	Andrew Shier	United States	C	—	—	—	—	—	—	—	—	—	—
1990	S	11	Brandon Reed	United States	G	—	—	—	—	—	—	—	—	—	—
1991	1	4	Scott Lachance	United States	D	819	31	112	143	567	—	—	—	—	—
1991	2	26	Zigmund Palffy	Czechoslovakia	RW	684	329	384	713	322	—	—	—	—	—
1991	3	48	Jamie McLennan	Canada	G	254	0	3	3	54	80	109	33	—	2.68
1991	4	70	Milan Hnilicka	Czechoslovakia	G	121	0	2	2	14	58	67	13	—	3.48
1991	5	92	Steve Junker	Canada	RW	5	0	0	0	0	—	—	—	—	—
1991	6	114	Rob Valicevic	United States	RW	193	28	20	48	61	—	—	—	—	—
1991	7	136	Andreas Johansson	Sweden	LW	377	81	88	169	190	—	—	—	—	—
1991	8	158	Todd Sparks	Canada	LW	—	—	—	—	—	—	—	—	—	—
1991	9	180	John Johnson	Canada	C	—	—	—	—	—	—	—	—	—	—
1991	10	202	Robert Canavan	United States	LW	—	—	—	—	—	—	—	—	—	—
1991	11	224	Markus Thuresson	Sweden	C	—	—	—	—	—	—	—	—	—	—
1991	12	246	Marty Schriner	United States	C	—	—	—	—	—	—	—	—	—	—
1991	S	4	Jim Bonner	United States	D	—	—	—	—	—	—	—	—	—	—
1991	S	10	Jack Duffy	United States	D	—	—	—	—	—	—	—	—	—	—
1992	1	5	Darius Kasparaitis	Lithuania	D	863	27	136	163	1379	—	—	—	—	—
1992	3	56	Jarrett Deuling	Canada	LW	15	0	1	1	11	—	—	—	—	—
1992	5	104	Tomas Klimt	Czechoslovakia	C	—	—	—	—	—	—	—	—	—	—
1992	5	105	Ryan Duthie	Canada	C	—	—	—	—	—	—	—	—	—	—
1992	6	128	Derek Armstrong	Canada	C	477	72	149	221	355	—	—	—	—	—
1992	7	152	Vladimir Grachyov	Russia	RW	—	—	—	—	—	—	—	—	—	—
1992	7	159	Steve O'Rourke	Canada	D	—	—	—	—	—	—	—	—	—	—
1992	8	176	Jason Widmer	Canada	D	7	0	1	1	7	—	—	—	—	—
1992	9	200	Daniel Paradis	Canada	C	—	—	—	—	—	—	—	—	—	—
1992	10	224	David Wainwright	United States	D	—	—	—	—	—	—	—	—	—	—
1992	11	248	Andrei Vasilyev	Russia	LW	16	2	5	7	6	—	—	—	—	—
1992	S	8	Chris Foy	Canada	D	—	—	—	—	—	—	—	—	—	—
1993	1	23	Todd Bertuzzi	Canada	LW	1159	314	456	770	1478	—	—	—	—	—
1993	2	40	Bryan McCabe	Canada	D	1135	145	383	528	1732	—	—	—	—	—
1993	3	66	Vladimir Chebaturkin	Russia	D	62	2	7	9	52	—	—	—	—	—
1993	4	92	Warren Luhning	Canada	RW	29	0	1	1	21	—	—	—	—	—
1993	5	118	Tommy Salo	Sweden	G	526	0	7	7	67	210	225	73	—	2.55
1993	6	144	Peter Leboutillier	Canada	RW	35	2	1	3	176	—	—	—	—	—
1993	7	170	Darren Van Impe	Canada	D	411	25	90	115	397	—	—	—	—	—
1993	8	196	Rod Hinks	Canada	C	—	—	—	—	—	—	—	—	—	—
1993	9	222	Daniel Johansson	Sweden	D	—	—	—	—	—	—	—	—	—	—
1993	10	248	Stephane Larocque	Canada	RW	—	—	—	—	—	—	—	—	—	—
1993	11	274	Carl Charland	Canada	LW	—	—	—	—	—	—	—	—	—	—
1994	1	9	Brett Lindros	Canada	RW	51	2	5	7	147	—	—	—	—	—
1994	2	38	Jason Holland	Canada	D	81	4	5	9	36	—	—	—	—	—
1994	3	63	Jason Strudwick	Canada	LW	674	13	42	55	811	—	—	—	—	—
1994	4	90	Brad Lukowich	Canada	D	658	23	90	113	369	—	—	—	—	—
1994	5	112	Mark McArthur	Canada	G	—	—	—	—	—	—	—	—	—	—
1994	5	116	Albert O'Connell	United States	LW	—	—	—	—	—	—	—	—	—	—
1994	6	142	Jason Stewart	United States	C	—	—	—	—	—	—	—	—	—	—
1994	8	194	Mike Loach	Canada	C	—	—	—	—	—	—	—	—	—	—
1994	8	203	Peter Hogardh	Sweden	C	—	—	—	—	—	—	—	—	—	—
1994	9	220	Gord Walsh	Canada	LW	—	—	—	—	—	—	—	—	—	—
1994	10	246	Kirk DeWaele	Canada	D	—	—	—	—	—	—	—	—	—	—
1994	11	272	Dick Tarnstrom	Sweden	D	306	35	105	140	254	—	—	—	—	—
1995	1	2	Wade Redden	Canada	D	1023	109	348	457	665	—	—	—	—	—
1995	2	28	Jan Hlavac	Czech Republic	LW	436	90	134	224	138	—	—	—	—	—
1995	2	41	D. J. Smith	Canada	D	45	1	1	2	67	—	—	—	—	—
1995	5	106	Vladimir Orszagh	Slovakia	LW	289	54	65	119	194	—	—	—	—	—
1995	7	158	Andrew Taylor	Canada	LW	—	—	—	—	—	—	—	—	—	—
1995	9	210	David MacDonald	Canada	G	—	—	—	—	—	—	—	—	—	—
1995	9	211	Mike Broda	Canada	LW	—	—	—	—	—	—	—	—	—	—
1996	1	3	J. P. Dumont	Canada	RW	822	214	309	523	364	—	—	—	—	—
1996	2	29	Dan LaCouture	United States	LW	337	20	25	45	348	—	—	—	—	—
1996	3	56	Zdeno Chara	Slovakia	D	1680	209	471	680	2085	—	—	—	—	—
1996	4	83	Tyrone Garner	Canada	G	3	0	0	0	0	0	2	0	—	5.18
1996	5	109	Andrew Berenzweig	United States	D	37	3	7	10	14	—	—	—	—	—
1996	5	128	Petr Sachl	Czech Republic	C	—	—	—	—	—	—	—	—	—	—
1996	6	138	Todd Miller	Canada	C	—	—	—	—	—	—	—	—	—	—
1996	7	165	Joe Prestifilippo	United States	G	—	—	—	—	—	—	—	—	—	—
1996	8	192	Evgeny Korolev	Russia	D	42	1	4	5	20	—	—	—	—	—
1996	9	218	Mike Muzechka	Canada	D	—	—	—	—	—	—	—	—	—	—
1997	1	4	Roberto Luongo†	Canada	G	1044	0	23	23	46	489	392	33	91	2.52
1997	1	5	Eric Brewer	Canada	D	1009	77	194	271	792	—	—	—	—	—
1997	2	31	Jeff Zehr	Canada	LW	4	0	0	0	2	—	—	—	—	—
1997	3	59	Jarrett Smith	Canada	C	—	—	—	—	—	—	—	—	—	—
1997	3	79	Robert Schnabel	Czech Republic	D	22	0	3	3	34	—	—	—	—	—
1997	4	85	Petr Mika	Czech Republic	RW	3	0	0	0	0	—	—	—	—	—
1997	5	115	Adam Edinger	United States	C	—	—	—	—	—	—	—	—	—	—
1997	6	139	Bobby Leavins	Canada	LW	—	—	—	—	—	—	—	—	—	—
1997	7	166	Kris Knoblauch	Canada	LW	—	—	—	—	—	—	—	—	—	—
1997	8	196	Jeremy Symington	Canada	G	—	—	—	—	—	—	—	—	—	—
1997	9	222	Ryan Clark	Canada	D	—	—	—	—	—	—	—	—	—	—
1998	1	9	Michael Rupp	United States	LW	609	54	45	99	855	—	—	—	—	—
1998	2	36	Chris Nielsen	Tanzania	RW	52	6	8	14	8	—	—	—	—	—
1998	4	95	Andy Burnham	Canada	RW	—	—	—	—	—	—	—	—	—	—
1998	5	123	Jiri Dopita	Czech Republic	C	73	12	21	33	19	—	—	—	—	—
1998	6	155	Kevin Clauson	United States	D	—	—	—	—	—	—	—	—	—	—
1998	7	182	Evgeny Korolev	Russia	D	42	1	4	5	20	—	—	—	—	—
1998	8	209	Frederik Brind'Amour	Canada	G	—	—	—	—	—	—	—	—	—	—
1998	9	237	Ben Blais	United States	D	—	—	—	—	—	—	—	—	—	—
1998	9	242	Jason Doyle	Canada	RW	—	—	—	—	—	—	—	—	—	—
1998	9	250	Radek Matejovsky	Czech Republic	RW	—	—	—	—	—	—	—	—	—	—
1999	1	5	Tim Connolly	United States	C	697	131	300	431	300	—	—	—	—	—
1999	1	8	Taylor Pyatt	Canada	LW	859	140	140	280	430	—	—	—	—	—
1999	1	10	Branislav Mezei	Slovakia	D	240	5	19	24	311	—	—	—	—	—
1999	1	28	Kristian Kudroc	Slovakia	D	26	2	2	4	38	—	—	—	—	—
1999	3	78	Mattias Weinhandl	Sweden	RW	182	19	37	56	70	—	—	—	—	—
1999	3	87	Brian Collins	United States	C	—	—	—	—	—	—	—	—	—	—
1999	4	101	Juraj Kolnik	Slovakia	RW	240	46	49	95	84	—	—	—	—	—
1999	4	102	Johan Halvardsson	Sweden	D	—	—	—	—	—	—	—	—	—	—
1999	5	130	Justin Mapletoft	Canada	C	38	3	6	9	8	—	—	—	—	—
1999	5	140	Adam Johnson	United States	D	—	—	—	—	—	—	—	—	—	—
1999	6	163	Bjorn Melin	Sweden	RW	3	1	0	1	0	—	—	—	—	—
1999	8	228	Radek Martinek	Czech Republic	D	486	25	85	110	280	—	—	—	—	—
1999	9	255	Brett Henning	United States	C	—	—	—	—	—	—	—	—	—	—
1999	9	268	Tyler Scott	United States	D	—	—	—	—	—	—	—	—	—	—
2000	1	1	Rick DiPietro	United States	G	318	0	19	19	129	130	136	8	28	2.87
2000	1	5	Raffi Torres	Canada	LW	635	137	123	260	497	—	—	—	—	—
2000	4	101	Arto Tukio	Finland	D	—	—	—	—	—	—	—	—	—	—
2000	4	105	Vladimir Gorbunov	Russia	F	—	—	—	—	—	—	—	—	—	—
2000	5	136	Dmitri Upper	Kazakhstan	C	—	—	—	—	—	—	—	—	—	—
2000	5	148	Kristofer Ottosson	Sweden	F	—	—	—	—	—	—	—	—	—	—
2000	7	202	Ryan Caldwell	Canada	D	4	0	0	0	4	—	—	—	—	—
2000	9	264	Dimitri Altaryov	Russia	F	—	—	—	—	—	—	—	—	—	—
2000	9	267	Tomi Pettinen	Finland	D	24	0	0	0	18	—	—	—	—	—
2001	4	101	Cory Stillman	Canada	C	—	—	—	—	—	—	—	—	—	—
2001	5	132	Dusan Salficky	Czech Republic	G	—	—	—	—	—	—	—	—	—	—
2001	6	166	Andy Chiodo	Canada	G	8	0	0	0	0	3	4	1	—	3.46
2001	7	197	Jan Holub	Czech Republic	D	—	—	—	—	—	—	—	—	—	—
2001	8	228	Mike Bray	Canada	RW	—	—	—	—	—	—	—	—	—	—
2001	9	260	Bryan Perez	United States	F	—	—	—	—	—	—	—	—	—	—
2001	9	280	Roman Kukhtinov	Russia	D	—	—	—	—	—	—	—	—	—	—
2001	9	287	Juha-Pekka Ketola	Finland	C	—	—	—	—	—	—	—	—	—	—
2002	1	22	Sean Bergenheim	Finland	LW	506	96	84	180	379	—	—	—	—	—
2002	3	87	Frans Nielsen	Denmark	C	925	167	306	473	166	—	—	—	—	—
2002	5	149	Marcus Paulsson	Sweden	F	—	—	—	—	—	—	—	—	—	—
2002	6	189	Alexei Stonkus	Russia	D	—	—	—	—	—	—	—	—	—	—
2002	7	220	Brad Topping	Canada	G	—	—	—	—	—	—	—	—	—	—
2002	8	252	Martin Chabada	Czech Republic	F	—	—	—	—	—	—	—	—	—	—
2002	9	283	Per Braxenholm	Sweden	D	—	—	—	—	—	—	—	—	—	—
2003	1	15	Robert Nilsson	Canada	F	252	37	81	118	90	—	—	—	—	—
2003	2	48	Dmitri Chernykh	Russia	RW	—	—	—	—	—	—	—	—	—	—
2003	2	53	Evgeni Tunik	Russia	F	—	—	—	—	—	—	—	—	—	—
2003	2	58	Jeremy Colliton	Canada	C	57	3	3	6	26	—	—	—	—	—
2003	4	120	Stefan Blaho	Slovakia	RW	—	—	—	—	—	—	—	—	—	—
2003	6	182	Bruno Gervais	Canada	D	418	16	71	87	182	—	—	—	—	—
2003	7	212	Denis Rehak	Slovakia	D	—	—	—	—	—	—	—	—	—	—
2003	8	238	Cody Blanshan	United States	D	—	—	—	—	—	—	—	—	—	—
2003	8	246	Igor Volkov	Russia	RW	—	—	—	—	—	—	—	—	—	—
2004	1	16	Petteri Nokelainen	Finland	F	245	20	21	41	103	—	—	—	—	—
2004	2	47	Blake Comeau	Canada	RW	909	141	193	334	573	—	—	—	—	—
2004	3	82	Sergei Ogorodnikov	Russia	C	—	—	—	—	—	—	—	—	—	—
2004	4	115	Wes O'Neill	Canada	D	5	0	0	0	6	—	—	—	—	—
2004	5	148	Steve Regier	Canada	LW	26	3	1	4	8	—	—	—	—	—
2004	6	179	Jaroslav Mrazek	Czech Republic	D	—	—	—	—	—	—	—	—	—	—
2004	7	210	Emil Axelsson	Sweden	D	—	—	—	—	—	—	—	—	—	—
2004	7	227	Chris Campoli	Canada	D	440	35	111	146	200	—	—	—	—	—
2004	8	244	Jason Pitton	Canada	LW	—	—	—	—	—	—	—	—	—	—
2004	9	276	Sylvain Michaud	Canada	G	—	—	—	—	—	—	—	—	—	—
2005	1	15	Ryan O'Marra	Canada	C	33	1	6	7	17	—	—	—	—	—
2005	2	46	Dustin Kohn	Canada	D	22	0	4	4	4	—	—	—	—	—
2005	3	76	Shea Guthrie	Canada	F	—	—	—	—	—	—	—	—	—	—
2005	5	144	Masi Marjamaki	Finland	RW	1	0	0	0	0	—	—	—	—	—
2005	6	180	Tyrell Mason	Canada	D	—	—	—	—	—	—	—	—	—	—
2005	7	196	Nick Tuzzolino	United States	D	—	—	—	—	—	—	—	—	—	—
2005	7	210	Luciano Aquino	Canada	F	—	—	—	—	—	—	—	—	—	—
2006	1	7	Kyle Okposo	United States	RW	1051	242	372	614	554	—	—	—	—	—
2006	2	60	Jesse Joensuu	Finland	F	129	13	11	24	77	—	—	—	—	—
2006	3	70	Robin Figren	Sweden	F	—	—	—	—	—	—	—	—	—	—
2006	4	100	Rhett Rakhshani	United States	RW	7	0	0	0	2	—	—	—	—	—
2006	4	108	Jase Weslosky	Canada	G	—	—	—	—	—	—	—	—	—	—
2006	4	115	Tomas Marcinko	Slovakia	C	—	—	—	—	—	—	—	—	—	—
2006	4	119	Doug Rogers	United States	C	—	—	—	—	—	—	—	—	—	—
2006	5	126	Shane Sims	United States	D	1	0	0	0	0	—	—	—	—	—
2006	5	141	Kim Johansson	Sweden	F	—	—	—	—	—	—	—	—	—	—
2006	6	160	Andrew MacDonald	Canada	D	586	28	133	161	276	—	—	—	—	—
2006	6	171	Brian Day	United States	RW	—	—	—	—	—	—	—	—	—	—
2006	6	173	Stefan Ridderwall	Sweden	G	—	—	—	—	—	—	—	—	—	—
2006	7	190	Troy Mattila	United States	LW	—	—	—	—	—	—	—	—	—	—
2007	3	62	Mark Katic	Canada	D	11	0	1	1	4	—	—	—	—	—
2007	3	76	Jason Gregoire	Canada	LW	—	—	—	—	—	—	—	—	—	—
2007	4	106	Maxim Gratchev	Russia	LW	—	—	—	—	—	—	—	—	—	—
2007	6	166	Blake Kessel	United States	D	—	—	—	—	—	—	—	—	—	—
2007	7	196	Simon Lacroix	Canada	D	—	—	—	—	—	—	—	—	—	—
2008	1	9	Josh Bailey	Canada	C	1057	184	396	580	241	—	—	—	—	—
2008	2	36	Corey Trivino	Canada	C	—	—	—	—	—	—	—	—	—	—
2008	2	40	Aaron Ness	United States	D	72	1	6	7	22	—	—	—	—	—
2008	2	53	Travis Hamonic	Canada	D	926	53	191	244	803	—	—	—	—	—
2008	3	66	David Toews	Canada	C	—	—	—	—	—	—	—	—	—	—
2008	3	72	Jyri Niemi	Finland	D	—	—	—	—	—	—	—	—	—	—
2008	3	73	Kirill Petrov	Russia	RW	—	—	—	—	—	—	—	—	—	—
2008	4	96	Matt Donovan	United States	D	69	2	18	20	28	—	—	—	—	—
2008	4	102	David Ullstrom	Sweden	F	49	6	7	13	12	—	—	—	—	—
2008	5	126	Kevin Poulin	Canada	G	50	0	1	1	0	18	25	—	3	3.07
2008	5	148	Matt Martin	Canada	LW	987	81	97	178	1168	—	—	—	—	—
2008	6	156	Jared Spurgeon	Canada	D	1012	123	315	438	174	—	—	—	—	—
2008	6	175	Justin DiBenedetto	Canada	C	8	0	1	1	2	—	—	—	—	—
2009	1	1	John Tavares	Canada	C	1266	525	660	1185	549	—	—	—	—	—
2009	1	12	Calvin de Haan	Canada	D	679	24	125	149	249	—	—	—	—	—
2009	2	31	Mikko Koskinen	Finland	G	168	0	4	4	6	85	61	—	13	3.02
2009	3	62	Anders Nilsson	Sweden	G	161	0	3	3	6	59	74	—	15	3.06
2009	4	92	Casey Cizikas	Canada	C	978	124	156	280	457	—	—	—	—	—
2009	5	122	Anton Klementyev	Russia	D	1	0	0	0	0	—	—	—	—	—
2009	6	152	Anders Lee	United States	C	923	308	241	549	546	—	—	—	—	—
2010	1	5	Nino Niederreiter	Switzerland	LW	1030	248	251	499	450	—	—	—	—	—
2010	1	30	Brock Nelson	United States	C	1001	334	318	652	358	—	—	—	—	—
2010	3	65	Kirill Kabanov	Russia	LW	—	—	—	—	—	—	—	—	—	—
2010	3	82	Jason Clark	United States	F	—	—	—	—	—	—	—	—	—	—
2010	5	125	Tony DeHart	United States	D	—	—	—	—	—	—	—	—	—	—
2010	7	185	Cody Rosen	Canada	G	—	—	—	—	—	—	—	—	—	—
2011	1	5	Ryan Strome	Canada	C	916	174	327	501	646	—	—	—	—	—
2011	2	34	Scott Mayfield	United States	D	615	30	110	140	540	—	—	—	—	—
2011	2	50	Johan Sundstrom	Sweden	C	11	0	1	1	6	—	—	—	—	—
2011	3	63	Andrey Pedan	Russia	D	13	0	0	0	18	—	—	—	—	—
2011	4	95	Robbie Russo	United States	D	19	0	0	0	2	—	—	—	—	—
2011	5	125	John Persson	Sweden	LW	10	1	0	1	6	—	—	—	—	—
2011	5	127	Brenden Kichton	Canada	D	—	—	—	—	—	—	—	—	—	—
2011	7	185	Mitchell Theoret	Canada	C	—	—	—	—	—	—	—	—	—	—
2012	1	4	Griffin Reinhart	Canada	D	37	0	2	2	26	—	—	—	—	—
2012	2	34	Ville Pokka	Finland	D	—	—	—	—	—	—	—	—	—	—
2012	3	63	Adam Pelech	Canada	D	642	30	147	177	283	—	—	—	—	—
2012	4	103	Loic Leduc	Canada	D	—	—	—	—	—	—	—	—	—	—
2012	5	125	Doyle Somerby	United States	D	—	—	—	—	—	—	—	—	—	—
2012	6	155	Jesse Graham	Canada	D	—	—	—	—	—	—	—	—	—	—
2012	7	185	Jake Bischoff	United States	D	4	0	0	0	4	—	—	—	—	—
2013	1	15	Ryan Pulock	Canada	D	636	56	185	241	123	—	—	—	—	—
2013	3	70	Eamon McAdam	United States	G	—	—	—	—	—	—	—	—	—	—
2013	3	76	Taylor Cammarata	United States	F	—	—	—	—	—	—	—	—	—	—
2013	4	106	Stephon Williams	United States	G	—	—	—	—	—	—	—	—	—	—
2013	5	136	Victor Crus Rydberg	Sweden	C	—	—	—	—	—	—	—	—	—	—
2013	6	166	Alan Quine	Canada	C	106	10	18	28	22	—	—	—	—	—
2013	7	196	Kyle Burroughs	Canada	D	201	5	17	22	216	—	—	—	—	—
2014	1	5	Michael Dal Colle	Canada	LW	112	8	13	21	18	—	—	—	—	—
2014	1	28	Joshua Ho-Sang	Canada	C	53	7	17	24	20	—	—	—	—	—
2014	3	78	Ilya Sorokin	Russia	G	308	1	6	7	6	154	113	—	38	2.59
2014	4	95	Linus Soderstrom	Sweden	G	—	—	—	—	—	—	—	—	—	—
2014	4	108	Devon Toews	Canada	D	541	65	237	302	158	—	—	—	—	—
2014	6	155	Kyle Schempp	United States	C	—	—	—	—	—	—	—	—	—	—
2014	7	200	Lukas Sutter	United States	C	—	—	—	—	—	—	—	—	—	—
2015	1	16	Mathew Barzal	Canada	C	611	153	381	534	313	—	—	—	—	—
2015	1	28	Anthony Beauvillier	Canada	LW	713	146	153	299	149	—	—	—	—	—
2015	3	82	Mitchell Vande Sompel	Canada	D	—	—	—	—	—	—	—	—	—	—
2015	4	112	Parker Wotherspoon	Canada	D	188	4	42	46	100	—	—	—	—	—
2015	5	147	Ryan Pilon	Canada	D	—	—	—	—	—	—	—	—	—	—
2015	6	172	Andong Song	China	D	—	—	—	—	—	—	—	—	—	—
2015	7	202	Petter Hansson	Sweden	D	—	—	—	—	—	—	—	—	—	—
2016	1	19	Kieffer Bellows	United States	LW	114	16	16	32	37	—	—	—	—	—
2016	4	95	Anatoly Golyshev	Russia	LW	—	—	—	—	—	—	—	—	—	—
2016	4	120	Otto Koivula	Finland	LW	28	0	4	4	6	—	—	—	—	—
2016	6	170	Collin Adams	United States	LW	—	—	—	—	—	—	—	—	—	—
2016	7	193	Nick Pastujov	United States	LW	—	—	—	—	—	—	—	—	—	—
2016	7	200	David Quenneville	Canada	D	—	—	—	—	—	—	—	—	—	—
2017	2	46	Robin Salo	Finland	D	32	3	6	9	8	—	—	—	—	—
2017	3	77	Ben Mirageas	United States	D	—	—	—	—	—	—	—	—	—	—
2017	5	139	Sebastian Aho	Sweden	D	190	11	39	50	52	—	—	—	—	—
2017	6	165	Arnaud Durandeau	Canada	LW	4	0	0	0	2	—	—	—	—	—
2017	7	201	Logan Cockerill	United States	LW	—	—	—	—	—	—	—	—	—	—
2018	1	11	Oliver Wahlstrom	United States	RW	236	37	36	73	176	—	—	—	—	—
2018	1	12	Noah Dobson	Canada	D	468	62	215	277	152	—	—	—	—	—
2018	2	41	Bode Wilde	United States	D	—	—	—	—	—	—	—	—	—	—
2018	2	43	Ruslan Iskhakov	Russia	C	1	0	1	1	0	—	—	—	—	—
2018	3	72	Jakub Skarek	Czech Republic	G	2	0	0	0	0	0	1	0	—	3.94
2018	4	103	Jake Pivonka	United States	C	—	—	—	—	—	—	—	—	—	—
2018	5	134	Blade Jenkins	United States	LW	—	—	—	—	—	—	—	—	—	—
2018	7	196	Christian Krygier	United States	D	—	—	—	—	—	—	—	—	—	—
2019	1	23	Simon Holmstrom	Sweden	RW	279	60	60	120	40	—	—	—	—	—
2019	2	57	Samuel Bolduc	Canada	D	52	4	4	8	8	—	—	—	—	—
2019	5	147	Reece Newkirk	Canada	C	—	—	—	—	—	—	—	—	—	—
2019	6	178	Felix Bibeau	Canada	C	—	—	—	—	—	—	—	—	—	—
2019	7	209	Cole Coskey	United States	RW	—	—	—	—	—	—	—	—	—	—
2020	3	90	Alexander Ljungkrantz	Sweden	RW	—	—	—	—	—	—	—	—	—	—
2020	4	121	Alex Jefferies	United States	LW	—	—	—	—	—	—	—	—	—	—
2020	5	152	William Dufour	Canada	RW	1	0	0	0	0	—	—	—	—	—
2020	6	183	Matias Rajaniemi	Finland	D	—	—	—	—	—	—	—	—	—	—
2020	7	214	Henrik Tikkanen	Finland	G	—	—	—	—	—	—	—	—	—	—
2021	2	52	Aatu Raty	Finland	C	114	13	15	28	40	—	—	—	—	—
2021	3	93	Tristan Lennox	Canada	G	1	0	0	0	0	0	0	0	—	12.72
2021	4	125	Cameron Berg	United States	C	—	—	—	—	—	—	—	—	—	—
2021	5	157	Eetu Liukas	Finland	LW	—	—	—	—	—	—	—	—	—	—
2021	6	189	Aleksi Malinen	Finland	D	—	—	—	—	—	—	—	—	—	—
2021	7	221	Tomas Machu	Czech Republic	D	—	—	—	—	—	—	—	—	—	—
2022	2	65	Calle Odelius	Sweden	D	—	—	—	—	—	—	—	—	—	—
2022	3	78	Quinn Finley	United States	LW	—	—	—	—	—	—	—	—	—	—
2022	4	98	Isaiah George	Canada	D	37	1	5	6	6	—	—	—	—	—
2022	5	142	Matt Maggio	Canada	RW	—	—	—	—	—	—	—	—	—	—
2022	6	174	Daylan Kuefler	Canada	LW	—	—	—	—	—	—	—	—	—	—
2023	2	49	Danny Nelson	United States	C	—	—	—	—	—	—	—	—	—	—
2023	4	113	Jesse Nurmi	Finland	LW	—	—	—	—	—	—	—	—	—	—
2023	5	145	Justin Gill	Canada	C	—	—	—	—	—	—	—	—	—	—
2023	6	177	Zachary Schulz	United States	D	—	—	—	—	—	—	—	—	—	—
2023	7	209	Dennis Good Bogg	Sweden	D	—	—	—	—	—	—	—	—	—	—
2024	1	20	Cole Eiserman	United States	LW	—	—	—	—	—	—	—	—	—	—
2024	2	54	Jesse Pulkkinen	Finland	D	—	—	—	—	—	—	—	—	—	—
2024	2	61	Kamil Bednarik	United States	C	—	—	—	—	—	—	—	—	—	—
2024	4	115	Dmitry Gamzin	Russia	G	—	—	—	—	—	—	—	—	—	—
2024	5	147	Marcus Gidlof	Sweden	G	—	—	—	—	—	—	—	—	—	—
2024	6	179	Xavier Vellieux	Canada	D	—	—	—	—	—	—	—	—	—	—
2025	1	1	Matthew Schaefer	Canada	D	82	23	36	59	38	—	—	—	—	—
2025	1	16	Victor Eklund	Sweden	LW	1	0	1	1	0	—	—	—	—	—
2025	1	17	Kashawn Aitcheson	Canada	D	—	—	—	—	—	—	—	—	—	—
2025	2	42	Daniil Prokhorov	Russia	RW	—	—	—	—	—	—	—	—	—	—
2025	3	74	Luca Romano	Canada	C	—	—	—	—	—	—	—	—	—	—
2025	4	104	Tomas Poletin	Czech Republic	LW	—	—	—	—	—	—	—	—	—	—
2025	5	138	Sam Laurila	United States	D	—	—	—	—	—	—	—	—	—	—
2025	6	170	Burke Hood	Canada	G	—	—	—	—	—	—	—	—	—	—
2025	7	202	Jacob Kvasnicka	United States	RW	—	—	—	—	—	—	—	—	—	—
2026	1	13	Malte Gustafsson	Sweden	D	—	—	—	—	—	—	—	—	—	—
2026	4	109	Lincoln Kuehne	United States	D	—	—	—	—	—	—	—	—	—	—
2026	5	141	Vladimír Dravecký	Czechia	D	—	—	—	—	—	—	—	—	—	—
2026	6	173	Artyom Matyuk	Russia	C	—	—	—	—	—	—	—	—	—	—
2026	7	205	Bobby Cowan	United States	RW	—	—	—	—	—	—	—	—	—	—

== See also ==
- List of New York Islanders players
- 1972 NHL Expansion Draft
