= Batyrshin =

Batyrshin (Russian: Батыршин) is a Tatar masculine surname, its feminine counterpart is Batyrshina. It may refer to

- Rafael Batyrshin (born 1986), Russian ice hockey defenseman
- Ruslan Batyrshin (born 1975), Russian ice hockey player, brother of Rafael
- Yana Batyrshina (born 1979), Russian rhythmic gymnast
