= Provencher (disambiguation) =

Provencher is an electoral district covering the southeastern corner of Manitoba, Canada.

Provencher can also refer to:

- Provencher (surname)
- Several places in Winnipeg, Manitoba, Canada, named after Norbert Provencher:

- École Provencher, a school in the St. Boniface neighborhood
- Provencher Boulevard, in the St. Boniface neighborhood
- Provencher Bridge, in downtown Winnipeg

== See also ==
- Provencher Roy, Canadian architectural firm based in Montréal
- Provenchère (disambiguation)
