= Provencher (surname) =

Provencher is a surname. Notable people with the surname include:

- Cédrika Provencher (1997 – disappeared 2007), Canadian disappearance victim
- Claude Provencher (1949–2022), Canadian architect
- David Provencher, American politician
- Ghislaine Provencher, candidate from the Liberal Party of Canada in the 2006 Canadian federal elections
- Jennifer Provencher (born 1979), Canadian conservation biologist
- Jimmy Provencher (born 1975), Canadian ice hockey right winger
- Joseph Provencher (1843–1887), Canadian pioneer, politician, and newspaper editor
- Norbert Provencher (1787–1853), Canadian clergyman and missionary
- Pierre-Paul Provencher, bandoneon player in Canadian tango nuevo band Norteño
- Raymonde Provencher, Canadian documentary filmmaker
