= Daniel Johansson =

Daniel Johansson may refer to:

- Dan Johansson (born 1950), Swedish speed skater
- Daniel Glimmenvall (born 1974), Swedish ice hockey player, formerly known as Daniel Johansson
- Daniel Johansson (tenor) (born 1980), Swedish tenor
- Daniel Johansson (ice hockey), Swedish ice hockey player
- Daniel Johansson (footballer) (born 1987), Swedish footballer
- Daniel Hallingström (birth name Daniel Johansson; born 1981), Swedish footballer

== See also ==
- Daniel Johannsen (born 1978), Austrian tenor
- Daniel Johansen (disambiguation)
