= Emil Axelsson =

Emil Axelsson may refer to:

- Emil Axelsson (ice hockey) (born 1986), Swedish ice hockey
- Emil Axelsson (co-driver) (born 1983), Swedish rally co-driver
