= Provancher =

Provancher may refer to:

- Léon Abel Provancher (1820–1892), a Canadian Catholic parish priest and naturalist
- Léon-Provancher Ecological Reserve, a protected area in Bécancour, Quebec, Canada
- Provancher Creek, a tributary of the Mégiscane River in La Tuque, Mauricie, Quebec, Canada

== See also ==
- Provencher
- Provenchère (disambiguation)
