= Petr Franěk =

Czech ice hockey player

- Born: 6 April 1975 (age 51) Most, Czechoslovakia
- Height: 5 ft 10 in (178 cm)
- Weight: 187 lb (85 kg; 13 st 5 lb)
- Position: Goaltender
- Caught: Left
- Played for: Nürnberg Ice Tigers; HC Energie Karlovy Vary; HC Slavia Praha; HC Litvínov
- NHL draft: 205th overall, 1993; Quebec Nordiques
- Playing career: 1992–2014

Petr Franěk (born 6 April 1975 in Most) is a Czech former ice hockey goaltender.

== Career ==
Franěk was drafted in the 8th round, 205th overall by the Quebec Nordiques in the 1993 NHL entry draft, but never played in the National Hockey League. He played in North America in the International Hockey League for the Quebec Rafales, Utah Grizzlies and the Las Vegas Thunder and also spent two seasons in the American Hockey League for the Hershey Bears. He then moved to Germany to play one season with the Nürnberg Ice Tigers before moving back to the Czech Republic where he played for HC Energie Karlovy Vary and HC Slavia Praha. He joined the Iserlohn Roosters in 2006, serving as a backup to Dimitrij Kotschnew. From 2007 until end of his career in 2014, he played for the HC Litvínov of the Czech Extraliga.
