= Daniel Johansen =

Daniel Johansen may refer to:

- Daniel Johansen (athlete) (1885–1967), Norwegian track and field athlete
- Daniel Johansen (footballer) (born 1998), Faroese football player
- Daniel Johansen (actor, modell) (born 1986)
- Dan Anton Johansen (born 1979), Danish footballer

== See also ==
- Daniel Johansson (disambiguation)
