= Leonid Toropchenko =

Russian ice hockey player

- Born: 28 August 1968 Moscow, Russian SFSR, Soviet Union
- Died: May 2017 (aged 48)
- Height: 6 ft 4 in (193 cm)
- Weight: 220 lb (100 kg; 15 st 10 lb)
- Position: Forward
- Shot: Right
- Played for: SKA Leningrad; Khimik Voskresensk; Springfield Indians; Cleveland Lumberjacks; Torpedo Yaroslavl; Metallurg Magnitogorsk; Kristall Saratov
- NHL draft: 260th overall, 1993; Pittsburgh Penguins
- Playing career: 1987–2002

Leonid Aleksandrovich Toropchenko (Russian: Леонид Александрович Торопченко; 28 August 1968 – May 2017) was a Russian professional ice hockey forward.

== Playing career ==
Toropchenko played several years of professional hockey in Russia before signing with the Hartford Whalers on 11 September 1992. Because of an NHL rule where professional overseas players had to be drafted in order to play in the National Hockey League, Toropchenko did not make the final Whalers' roster and was assigned to their AHL affiliate in Springfield on 24 September. After putting up a career-best 61 points in 71 regular season games, he was drafted by the Pittsburgh Penguins in the tenth round of the 1993 NHL entry draft, going 260th overall. After being drafted, Toropchenko was assigned to the Penguins' IHL affiliate in Cleveland. After attending Penguins' training camp in 1993 (where he scored a goal during a preseason game vs the Toronto Maple Leafs) and 1994 and being demoted to Muskegon of the Colonial Hockey League, Toropchenko did not report. Instead, Toropchenko signed a one-year contract with Torpedo Yaroslavl of the Russian Superleague. He remained with the team for one season, scoring two points in sixteen games.

Toropchenko signed with Metallurg Magnitogorsk for the 1995–96 season and improved in goals (8), assists (7), and points (15) from his previous season in Yaroslavl. He did not play during the 1996-97 RSL season, but returned to hockey by joining the Kristall Saratov during the 1997–98 season, where his points totals once again decreased.

Torpochenko finished his career in the Vysshaya Hokkeinaya Liga, splitting his time between four different teams from 1998 until his retirement in 2002.

== Personal life ==
Toropchenko was named Massachusetts' first ever "Deadbeat Of The Month", a program started in February 1998 by Acting Governor Paul Cellucci. His daughter's mother met Toropchenko while he was a player of the Springfield Indians in 1992 and had not heard from Toropchenko since September 1994. At the time of the citation, Toropchenko owed four years of unpaid support totaling $35,400. While the program had a 90% success rate in its first year, Toropchenko's case remained unsolved a year later as he left the United States in 1994.

His son, Alexey, was drafted 113th overall by the St. Louis Blues in the fourth round of the 2017 NHL entry draft and is currently playing for the Blues' AHL affiliate, the Springfield Thunderbirds.

Toropchenko died in May 2017, at the age of 48, of a heart attack.
