= Provenchère =

Provenchère may refer to:

- Provenchères-lès-Darney, a commune in the region of Lorraine
- Provenchère, Doubs, a commune in the region of Franche-Comté
- Provenchère, Haute-Saône, another commune in the region of Franche-Comté
- Provenchères-sur-Fave, a commune in region of Lorraine
  - Canton of Provenchères-sur-Fave

== See also ==
- Provencher (disambiguation)
- Provancher (disambiguation)
