= Vladimir Krechin =

Russian ice hockey player

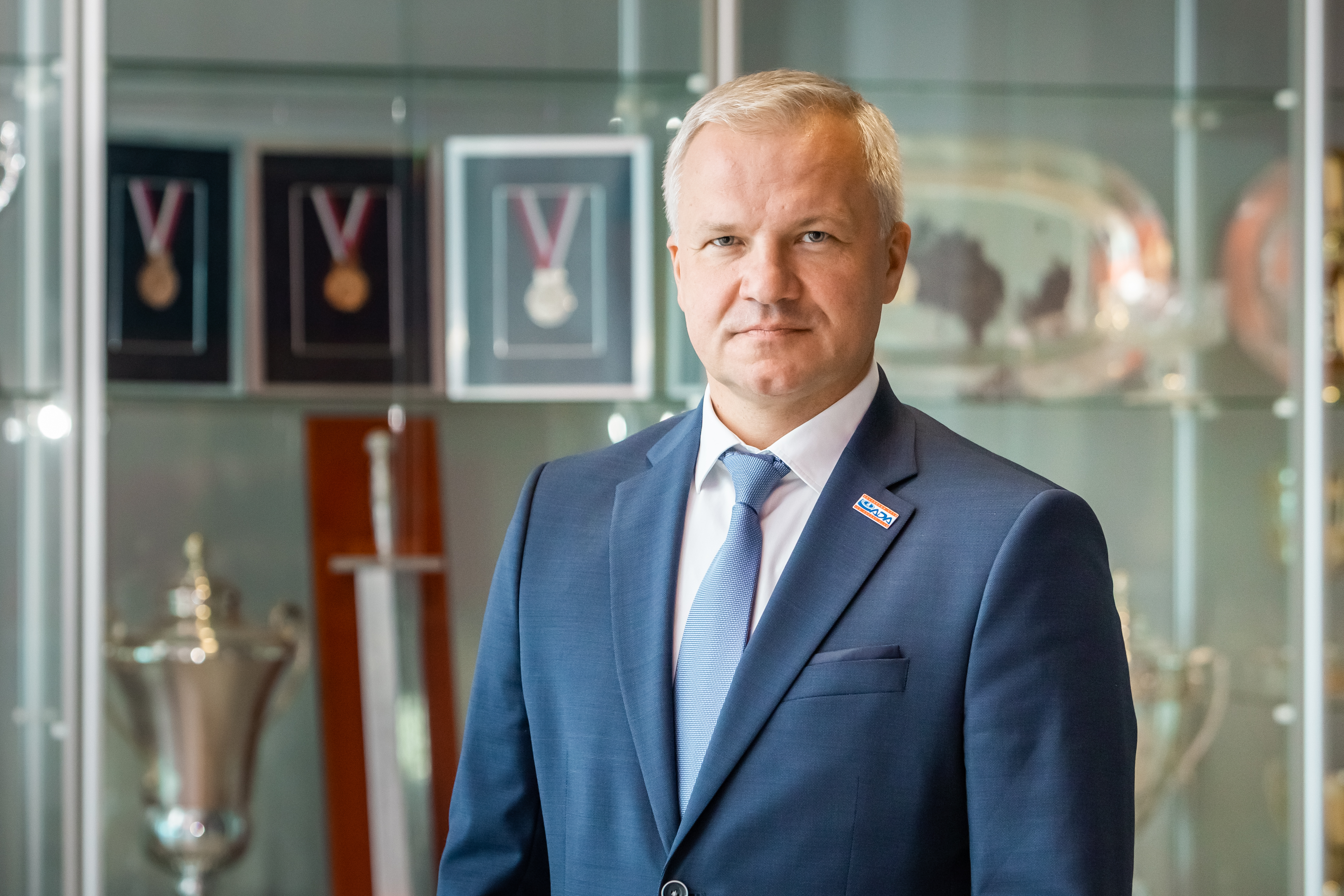
- Portrait of Vladimir Krechin
- Born: March 23, 1975 (age 51) Chelyabinsk, Russia, U.S.S.R.
- Height: 5 ft 11 in (180 cm)
- Weight: 194 lb (88 kg; 13 st 12 lb)
- Position: Left wing
- Shot: Left
- Played for: Traktor Chelyabinsk; Mechel Chelyabinsk; Lokomotiv Yaroslavl; Metallurg Novokuznetsk
- NHL draft: 114th overall, 1993; Philadelphia Flyers
- Playing career: 1996–2008

Vladimir Nikolayevich Krechin (Russian: Владимир Николаевич Кречин; born March 23, 1975) is a Russian former professional ice hockey player who played in the Russian Superleague (RSL). Krechin was drafted in the fifth round of the 1993 NHL entry draft by the Philadelphia Flyers and he played three seasons of junior hockey in North America for the Windsor Spitfires of the Ontario Hockey League before returning to Russia. He played eight seasons in the RSL for Traktor Chelyabinsk, Mechel Chelyabinsk, Lokomotiv Yaroslavl, and Metallurg Novokuznetsk. He was the general manager of the HC Kunlun Red Star for their inaugural season in 2016–17.
