= Warren Luhning =

Canadian ice hockey player

- Born: July 3, 1975 (age 51) Edmonton, Alberta, Canada
- Height: 6 ft 2 in (188 cm)
- Weight: 200 lb (91 kg; 14 st 4 lb)
- Position: Right wing
- Shot: Right
- Played for: New York Islanders; Dallas Stars
- NHL draft: 92nd overall, 1993; New York Islanders
- Playing career: 1997–2000

Warren Luhning (born July 3, 1975) is a Canadian retired professional ice hockey player who was a winger for parts of three seasons in the National Hockey League (NHL) for the New York Islanders and Dallas Stars.

== Playing career ==
He played college hockey at the University of Michigan for the Michigan Wolverines and was drafted by the New York Islanders 92nd overall. After turning professional, he played for the Islanders and Dallas Stars in the NHL.

Warren Luhning played for Canada’s National Under-18 Team at the 1992 Pacific Cup (held August 1–4, 1992, in Tokyo, Japan). He’s listed on the roster with 2 points (2 assists in 3 games), and Canada won gold, going undefeated and beating Russia 5–3 in the deciding game. That gold-medal win lines up with what he mentioned in his own bio about “winning the world championship” with the U-18 team — this Pacific Cup was the predecessor to today’s Hlinka Gretzky Cup.

While with Dallas, Luhning suffered what proved to be a career-ending concussion during an October 22, 1999 game against the New Jersey Devils. Post hockey Warren earned an MBA from the Yale School of Management and is retired living in the San Francisco Bay Area.

== Career statistics ==
			Regular season					Playoffs
Season	Team	League	GP	G	A	Pts	PIM	GP	G	A	Pts	PIM
1992–93	Calgary Royals	AJHL	46	18	25	43	287	—	—	—	—	—
1993–94	University of Michigan	NCAA	38	13	6	19	83	—	—	—	—	—
1994–95	University of Michigan	NCAA	36	17	24	41	80	—	—	—	—	—
1995–96	University of Michigan	NCAA	40	20	32	52	123	—	—	—	—	—
1996–97	University of Michigan	NCAA	43	22	23	45	106	—	—	—	—	—
1997–98	New York Islanders	NHL	8	0	0	0	0	—	—	—	—	—
1997–98	Kentucky Thoroughblades	AHL	51	6	7	13	82	—	—	—	—	—
1998–99	Lowell Lock Monsters	AHL	56	20	20	40	67	3	0	3	3	16
1998–99	New York Islanders	NHL	11	0	0	0	8	—	—	—	—	—
1999–00	Dallas Stars	NHL	10	0	1	1	13	—	—	—	—	—
1999–00	Michigan K-Wings	IHL	3	1	1	2	4	—	—	—	—	—
NHL totals			29	0	1	1	21	—	—	—	—	—
