= 1993 NHL entry draft =

1993 North American ice hockey draft

General information
- Date: June 26, 1993
- Location: Colisée de Québec; Quebec City, Quebec, Canada

Overview
- 286 total selections in 11 rounds
- First selection: (Canada) Alexandre Daigle (Ottawa Senators)
- Hall of Famers: 2: D Chris Pronger; LW Paul Kariya

The 1993 NHL entry draft was the 31st draft for the National Hockey League. It took place on June 26, 1993, at the Colisée de Québec in Quebec City.

Alexandre Daigle, the first overall pick, is widely regarded as one of the all-time greatest draft busts in NHL history. Regarding his draft position, Daigle uttered the now infamous comment, "I'm glad I got drafted first, because no one remembers number two". Chris Pronger, selected after Daigle with the second overall pick by the Hartford Whalers, was elected to the Hockey Hall of Fame in 2015.

The last active player in the NHL from the 1993 NHL entry draft was Kimmo Timonen, who retired after the 2014–15 season.

== Selections by round ==
=== Round one ===
= NHL All-Star team ·	= NHL All-Star (Note: Players are identified as an All-Star if they were selected for the All-Star game at any time in their career.) ·	= NHL All-Star and NHL All-Star team ·	= Hall of Famers

#	Player	Nationality	NHL team	College/junior/club team
1	Alexandre Daigle (C)	Canada	Ottawa Senators	Victoriaville Tigres (QMJHL)
2	Chris Pronger (D)	Canada	Hartford Whalers (from San Jose)^{1}	Peterborough Petes (OHL)
3	Chris Gratton (C)	Canada	Tampa Bay Lightning	Kingston Frontenacs (OHL)
4	Paul Kariya (LW)	Canada	Mighty Ducks of Anaheim	University of Maine (Hockey East)
5	Rob Niedermayer (C)	Canada	Florida Panthers	Medicine Hat Tigers (WHL)
6	Viktor Kozlov (C)	Russia	San Jose Sharks (from Hartford)^{2}	Dynamo Moscow (Russia)
7	Jason Arnott (C)	Canada	Edmonton Oilers	Oshawa Generals (OHL)
8	Niklas Sundstrom (RW)	Sweden	New York Rangers	MODO (Sweden)
9	Todd Harvey (RW)	Canada	Dallas Stars	Detroit Junior Red Wings (OHL)
10	Jocelyn Thibault (G)	Canada	Quebec Nordiques (from Philadelphia)^{3}	Sherbrooke Faucons (QMJHL)
11	Brendan Witt (D)	Canada	Washington Capitals (from St. Louis)^{4}	Seattle Thunderbirds (WHL)
12	Kenny Jönsson (D)	Sweden	Toronto Maple Leafs (from Buffalo)^{5}	Rögle BK (Sweden)
13	Denis Pederson (C)	Canada	New Jersey Devils	Prince Albert Raiders (WHL)
14	Adam Deadmarsh (RW)	United States	Quebec Nordiques (from NY Islanders)^{6}	Portland Winter Hawks (WHL)
15	Mats Lindgren (C)	Sweden	Winnipeg Jets	Skellefteå AIK (Sweden)
16	Nick Stajduhar (D)	Canada	Edmonton Oilers (from Los Angeles)^{7}	London Knights (OHL)
17	Jason Allison (C)	Canada	Washington Capitals	London Knights (OHL)
18	Jesper Mattsson (RW)	Sweden	Calgary Flames	Malmö IF (Sweden)
19	Landon Wilson (RW)	United States	Toronto Maple Leafs	Dubuque Fighting Saints (USHL)
20	Mike Wilson (D)	Canada	Vancouver Canucks	Sudbury Wolves (OHL)
21	Saku Koivu (C)	Finland	Montreal Canadiens	TPS (Finland)
22	Anders Eriksson (D)	Sweden	Detroit Red Wings	MODO (Sweden)
23	Todd Bertuzzi (RW)	Canada	New York Islanders (from Quebec)^{8}	Guelph Storm (OHL)
24	Eric Lecompte (LW)	Canada	Chicago Blackhawks	Hull Olympiques (QMJHL)
25	Kevyn Adams (C)	United States	Boston Bruins	Miami University (CCHA)
26	Stefan Bergkvist (D)	Sweden	Pittsburgh Penguins	Leksands IF (Sweden)

Notes

1. The San Jose Sharks' first-round pick went to the Hartford Whalers as the result of a trade on June 26 that sent Sergei Makarov, first and third-round pick both in 1993 (6th and 58th overall) and Toronto's second-round pick (45th overall) in 1993 to San Jose in exchange for this pick.
2. The Hartford Whalers' first-round pick went to the San Jose Sharks as the result of a trade on June 26 that sent the second overall pick in 1993 to Hartford in exchange for Sergei Makarov, Toronto's second-round pick (45th overall) and a third-round pick (58th overall) both in 1993 and this pick.
3. The Philadelphia Flyers' first-round pick went to the Quebec Nordiques as the result of a trade on June 30, 1992, that sent the Eric Lindros to Philadelphia in exchange for Ron Hextall, Peter Forsberg, Steve Duchesne, Kerry Huffman, Mike Ricci, future considerations (Chris Simon and a first-round pick in 1994 on July 21, 1992), $15 million in cash and this pick.
4. The St. Louis Blues' first-round pick went to the Washington Capitals as compensation for not matching an offer sheet from St. Louis to restricted free agent Scott Stevens on July 16, 1990.
5. The Buffalo Sabres' first-round pick went to the Toronto Maple Leafs as the result of a trade on February 2 that sent Grant Fuhr and a fifth-round pick in 1995 to Buffalo in exchange for Dave Andreychuk, Darren Puppa and this pick.
6. The New York Islanders' first-round pick went to the Quebec Nordiques as the result of a trade on June 20 that sent Ron Hextall and a first-round pick in 1993 (23rd overall) to New York in exchange for Mark Fitzpatrick and this pick.
7. The Los Angeles Kings' first-round pick went to the Edmonton Oilers as the result of a trade on August 9, 1988, that sent Wayne Gretzky, Mike Krushelnyski and Marty McSorley to Los Angeles in exchange for Jimmy Carson, Martin Gelinas, $15 million in cash and first-round picks in 1989, 1991 and this pick.
8. The Quebec Nordiques' first-round pick went to the New York Islanders as the result of a trade on June 20 that sent Mark Fitzpatrick and a first-round pick in 1993 (14th overall) to Quebec in exchange for Ron Hextall and this pick.

=== Round two ===
#	Player	Nationality	NHL team	College/junior/club team
27	Radim Bicanek (D)	Czech Republic	Ottawa Senators	Dukla Jihlava (Czech Republic)
28	Shean Donovan (RW)	Canada	San Jose Sharks	Ottawa 67's (OHL)
29	Tyler Moss (G)	Canada	Tampa Bay Lightning	Kingston Frontenacs (OHL)
30	Nikolai Tsulygin (D)	Russia	Mighty Ducks of Anaheim	Salavat Yulaev Ufa (Russia)
31	Scott Langkow (G)	Canada	Winnipeg Jets (from Florida)^{1}	Portland Winter Hawks (WHL)
32	Jay Pandolfo (LW)	United States	New Jersey Devils (from Hartford)^{2}	Boston University (Hockey East)
33	David Vyborny (RW)	Czech Republic	Edmonton Oilers	Sparta Prague (Czech Republic)
34	Lee Sorochan (D)	Canada	New York Rangers	Lethbridge Hurricanes (WHL)
35	Jamie Langenbrunner (RW)	United States	Dallas Stars	Cloquet High School (USHS–MN)
36	Janne Niinimaa (D)	Finland	Philadelphia Flyers	Karpat (Finland)
37	Maxim Bets (LW)	Russia	St. Louis Blues	Spokane Chiefs (WHL)
38	Denis Tsygurov (D)	Russia	Buffalo Sabres	Lada Togliatti (Russia)
39	Brendan Morrison (C)	Canada	New Jersey Devils	University of Michigan (CCHA)
40	Bryan McCabe (D)	Canada	New York Islanders	Spokane Chiefs (WHL)
41	Kevin Weekes (G)	Canada	Florida Panthers (from Winnipeg)^{3}	Owen Sound Platers (OHL)
42	Shayne Toporowski (RW)	Canada	Los Angeles Kings	Prince Albert Raiders (WHL)
43	Alexei Budayev (RW)	Russia	Winnipeg Jets (from Washington)^{4}	Kristall Elektrostal (Russia)
44	Jamie Allison (D)	Canada	Calgary Flames	Detroit Junior Red Wings (OHL)
45	Vlastimil Kroupa (D)	Czech Republic	San Jose Sharks (from Toronto via Hartford)^{5}	Chemopetrol Litvinov (Czech Republic)
46	Rick Girard (C)	Canada	Vancouver Canucks	Swift Current Broncos (WHL)
47	Rory Fitzpatrick (D)	United States	Montreal Canadiens	Sudbury Wolves (OHL)
48	Jon Coleman (D)	United States	Detroit Red Wings	Andover Academy (USHS–MA)
49	Ashley Buckberger (RW)	Canada	Quebec Nordiques	Swift Current Broncos (WHL)
50	Eric Manlow (C)	Canada	Chicago Blackhawks	Kitchener Rangers (OHL)
51	Matt Alvey (RW)	United States	Boston Bruins	Springfield Olympics (NEJHL)
52	Domenic Pittis (C)	Canada	Pittsburgh Penguins	Lethbridge Hurricanes (WHL)

Notes

1. The Florida Panthers' second-round pick went to the Winnipeg Jets as the result of a trade on June 26 that sent a second and third-round pick both in 1993 (41st and 67th overall) to Florida in exchange for this pick.
2. The Hartford Whalers' second-round pick went to the New Jersey Devils as the result of a trade on August 28, 1992, that sent Sean Burke and Eric Weinrich to Hartford in exchange for Bobby Holik, a conditional pick in 1994 and this pick.
3. The Winnipeg Jets' second-round pick went to the Florida Panthers as the result of a trade on June 26 that sent a second-round pick in 1993 (31st overall) to Winnipeg in exchange for a third-round pick in 1993 (67th overall) and this pick.
4. The Washington Capitals' second-round pick went to the Winnipeg Jets as the result of a trade on March 22 that sent Rick Tabaracci to Washington in exchange for Jim Hrivnak and this pick.
5. The Toronto Maple Leafs' second-round pick went to the San Jose Sharks as the result of a trade on June 26 that sent the second overall pick in 1993 to Hartford in exchange for Sergei Makarov, a first and third-round pick both in 1993 (6th and 58th overall) and this pick.
  Hartford previously acquired this pick as the result of a trade on November 24, 1992, that sent John Cullen to Toronto in exchange for this pick.

=== Round three ===
#	Player	Nationality	NHL team	College/junior/club team
53	Patrick Charbonneau (G)	Canada	Ottawa Senators	Victoriaville Tigres (QMJHL)
54	Bogdan Savenko (RW)	Ukraine	Chicago Blackhawks (from San Jose)^{1}	Niagara Falls Thunder (OHL)
55	Allan Egeland (C)	Canada	Tampa Bay Lightning (from Tampa Bay via NY Rangers)^{2}	Tacoma Rockets (WHL)
56	Valeri Karpov (RW)	Russia	Mighty Ducks of Anaheim	Traktor Chelyabinsk (Russia)
57	Chris Armstrong (D)	Canada	Florida Panthers	Moose Jaw Warriors (WHL)
58	Ville Peltonen (LW)	Finland	San Jose Sharks (from Hartford)^{3}	HIFK (Finland)
59	Kevin Paden (C)	United States	Edmonton Oilers	Detroit Junior Red Wings (OHL)
60	Alexander Kerch (RW)	Latvia	Edmonton Oilers (from NY Rangers)^{4}	Pardaugava Riga (Latvia)
61	Maxim Galanov (D)	Russia	New York Rangers (from Dallas)^{5}	Lada Togliatti (Russia)
62	Dave Roche (LW)	Canada	Pittsburgh Penguins (from Philadelphia via Winnipeg and Philadelphia)^{6}	Peterborough Petes (OHL)
63	Jamie Rivers (D)	Canada	St. Louis Blues	Sudbury Wolves (OHL)
64	Ethan Philpott (RW)	United States	Buffalo Sabres	Andover Academy (USHS–MA)
65	Krzysztof Oliwa (LW)	Poland	New Jersey Devils	Welland Flames (GHJHL)
66	Vladimir Chebaturkin (D)	Russia	New York Islanders	Kristall Elektrostal (Russia)
67	Mikael Tjallden (D)	Sweden	Florida Panthers (from Winnipeg)^{7}	MODO (Sweden)
68	Jeff Mitchell (RW)	United States	Los Angeles Kings	Detroit Junior Red Wings (OHL)
69	Patrick Boileau (D)	Canada	Washington Capitals	Laval Titan (QMJHL)
70	Dan Tompkins (LW)	United States	Calgary Flames	Omaha Lancers (USHL)
71	Vaclav Prospal (LW)	Czech Republic	Philadelphia Flyers (from Toronto)^{8}	HC Ceske Budejovice (Czech Republic)
72	Marek Malik (D)	Czech Republic	Hartford Whalers (from Vancouver)^{9}	TJ Vitkovice Jr. (Czech Republic)
73	Sebastien Bordeleau (C)	Canada	Montreal Canadiens	Hull Olympiques (QMJHL)
74	Kevin Hilton (C)	United States	Detroit Red Wings	University of Michigan (CCHA)
75	Bill Pierce (C)	United States	Quebec Nordiques	Lawrence Academy (USHS–MA)
76	Ryan Huska (LW)	Canada	Chicago Blackhawks	Kamloops Blazers (WHL)
77	Milos Holan (D)	Czech Republic	Philadelphia Flyers (from Boston)^{10}	TJ Vitkovice (Czech Republic)
78	Steve Washburn (C)	Canada	Florida Panthers (from Pittsburgh via Tampa Bay)^{11}	Ottawa 67's (OHL)

Notes

1. The San Jose Sharks' third-round pick went to the Chicago Blackhawks as the result of a trade on September 20, 1991, that sent Wayne Presley to San Jose in exchange for this pick.
2. The Tampa Bay Lightning's third-round pick was re-acquired as the result of a trade on June 25 that sent Glenn Healy to New York in exchange for this pick.
  The New York Rangers previously acquired this pick as compensation for not matching an offer sheet from Tampa Bay to restricted free agent Rob Zamuner on July 13, 1992.
3. The Hartford Whalers' third-round pick went to the San Jose Sharks as the result of a trade on June 26 that sent the second overall pick in 1993 to Hartford in exchange for Sergei Makarov, a first-round pick and Toronto's second-round pick both in 1993 (6th and 45th overall) and this pick.
4. The New York Rangers' third-round pick went to the Edmonton Oilers as the result of a trade on December 11, 1992, that sent Kevin Lowe to New York in exchange for Roman Oksiuta and this pick.
5. The Dallas Stars' third-round pick went to the New York Rangers as the result of a trade on March 10, 1992, that sent Mark Janssens to Minnesota in exchange for Mario Thyer and this pick.
6. The Philadelphia Flyers' third-round pick went to the Pittsburgh Penguins as the result of a trade on February 19, 1992, that sent Mark Recchi, Brian Benning and a first-round pick in 1992 to Philadelphia in exchange for Kjell Samuelsson, Rick Tocchet, Ken Wregget and this pick.
  Philadelphia's fourth-round pick was re-acquired as the result of a trade on June 11 that sent Stephane Beauregard to Winnipeg in exchange for a fifth-round pick in the 1994 entry draft and this pick.
  The Philadelphia Flyers' third-round pick went to the Winnipeg Jets as the result of a trade on October 1, 1992, that sent Stephane Beauregard to Philadelphia in exchange for a fifth-round pick in the 1994 entry draft and this pick.
7. The Winnipeg Jets' third-round pick went to the Florida Panthers as the result of a trade on June 26 that sent a second-round pick in 1993 (31st overall) to Winnipeg in exchange for a second-round pick in 1993 (41st overall) and this pick.
8. The Toronto Maple Leafs' third-round pick went to the Philadelphia Flyers as the result of a trade on June 29, 1991, that sent the rights to Mike Bullard to Toronto in exchange for this pick.
9. The Vancouver Canucks' third-round pick went to the Hartford Whalers as the result of a trade on March 22 that sent Murray Craven, and a fifth-round pick in 1993 (124th overall) to Vancouver in exchange for Robert Kron, future considerations (Jim Sandlak on May 17, 1993) and this pick.
10. The Boston Bruins' third-round pick went to the Philadelphia Flyers as the result of a trade on January 2, 1992, that sent Gord Murphy, Brian Dobbin, a third-round pick in 1992 and future considerations (a fourth-round pick in 1993, 88th overall) to Boston in exchange for Garry Galley, Wes Walz and this pick.
11. The Pittsburgh Penguins' third-round pick went to the Florida Panthers as the result of a trade on June 26 that ensured that Florida selected Darren Puppa in the 1993 NHL expansion draft from Toronto to Tampa Bay in exchange for this pick.
  Tampa Bay previously acquired this pick as the result of a trade on March 22 that sent Peter Taglianetti to Pittsburgh in exchange for this pick.

=== Round four ===
#	Player	Nationality	NHL team	College/junior/club team
79	Ruslan Batyrshin (D)	Russia	Winnipeg Jets (from Ottawa)^{1}	Dynamo Moscow (Russia)
80	Alexander Osadchy (D)	Russia	San Jose Sharks	CSKA Moscow (Russia)
81	Marian Kacir (RW)	Czech Republic	Tampa Bay Lightning	Owen Sound Platers (OHL)
82	Joel Gagnon (G)	Canada	Mighty Ducks of Anaheim	Oshawa Generals (OHL)
83	Bill McCauley (C)	United States	Florida Panthers	Detroit Junior Red Wings (OHL)
84	Trevor Roenick (RW)	United States	Hartford Whalers	Boston Junior Bruins (NEJHL)
85	Adam Wiesel (D)	United States	Montreal Canadiens (from Edmonton)^{2}	Springfield Olympics (NEJHL)
86	Sergei Olympiev (LW)	Belarus	New York Rangers	Dinamo Minsk (Belarus)
87	Chad Lang (G)	Canada	Dallas Stars	Peterborough Petes (OHL)
88	Charles Paquette (D)	Canada	Boston Bruins (from Philadelphia via Detroit and Philadelphia)^{3}	Sherbrooke Faucons (QMJHL)
89	Jamal Mayers (RW)	Canada	St. Louis Blues	Western Michigan University (CCHA)
90	Eric Daze (LW)	Canada	Chicago Blackhawks (from Buffalo)^{4}	Beauport Harfangs (QMJHL)
91	Cosmo DuPaul (C)	Canada	Ottawa Senators (from New Jersey)^{5}	Victoriaville Tigres (QMJHL)
92	Warren Luhning (RW)	Canada	New York Islanders	Calgary Royals (AJHL)
93	Ravil Gusmanov (RW)	Russia	Winnipeg Jets	Traktor Chelyabinsk (Russia)
94	Bob Wren (LW)	Canada	Los Angeles Kings	Detroit Junior Red Wings (OHL)
95	Jason Smith (D)	Canada	Calgary Flames (from Washington via Hartford)^{6}	Princeton University (ECAC)
96	Marty Murray (C)	Canada	Calgary Flames	Brandon Wheat Kings (WHL)
97	John Jakopin (D)	Canada	Detroit Red Wings (from Toronto via Washington and Winnipeg)^{7}	St. Michael's Buzzers (MetJHL)
98	Dieter Kochan (G)	Canada	Vancouver Canucks	Kelowna Spartans (BCJHL)
99	Jean-Francois Houle (LW)	Canada	Montreal Canadiens	Northwood School (USHS–NY)
100	Benoit Larose (D)	Canada	Detroit Red Wings	Laval Titan (QMJHL)
101	Ryan Tocher (D)	Canada	Quebec Nordiques	Niagara Falls Thunder (OHL)
102	Patrik Pysz (C)	Poland	Chicago Blackhawks	Augsburger Panther (Germany)
103	Shawn Bates (C)	United States	Boston Bruins	Medford High School (USHS–MA)
104	Jonas Andersson-Junkka (D)	Sweden	Pittsburgh Penguins	Kiruna IF (Sweden)

Notes

1. The Ottawa Senators' fourth-round pick went to the Winnipeg Jets as the result of a trade on March 4 that sent the rights to Dmitri Filimonov to Ottawa in exchange for this pick.
2. The Edmonton Oilers' fourth-round pick went to the Montreal Canadiens as the result of a trade on August 27, 1992, that sent Shayne Corson, Brent Gilchrist and Vladimir Vujtek to Edmonton in exchange for Vincent Damphousse and this pick.
3. The Philadelphia Flyers' fourth-round pick went to the Boston Bruins as the result of a trade on January 2, 1992, that sent Garry Galley, Wes Walz and a third-round pick in 1993 (77th overall) to Philadelphia in exchange for Gord Murphy, Brian Dobbin, a third-round pick in 1992 and future considerations (this pick).
  The Philadelphia Flyers' fourth-round pick was re-acquired as the result of a trade on June 20 that sent Greg Johnson and Philadelphia's fifth-round pick in 1994 to Detroit in exchange for Jim Cummings and this pick.
  The Philadelphia Flyers' fourth-round pick went to the Detroit Red Wings as the result of a trade on October 1, 1992, that sent Brent Fedyk to Philadelphia in exchange for this pick.
4. The Buffalo Sabres' fourth-round pick went to the Chicago Blackhawks as the result of a trade on August 7, 1992, that sent Dominik Hasek to Buffalo in exchange for Stephane Beauregard and this pick.
5. The New Jersey Devils' fourth-round pick went to the Ottawa Senators as the result of a trade on June 20 that sent Peter Sidorkiewicz, future considerations (Mike Peluso on June 26, 1993) and a fifth-round pick in 1994 to New Jersey in exchange for Craig Billington, Troy Mallette and this pick.
6. The Washington Capitals' fourth-round pick went to the Calgary Flames as the result of a trade on June 20 that sent Sergei Makarov to Hartford in exchange for future considerations (this pick).
  Hartford previously acquired this pick as the result of a trade on October 3, 1991, that sent Todd Krygier to Washington in exchange for this pick.
7. The Toronto Maple Leafs' fourth-round pick went to the Detroit Red Wings as the result of a trade on June 11 that sent Paul Ysebaert and future considerations (Alan Kerr on June 18, 1993) to Winnipeg in exchange for Aaron Ward and this pick.
  Winnipeg previously acquired this pick as the result of a trade on October 1, 1992, that sent Pat Elynuik to Washington in exchange for John Druce and this pick.
  Washington previously acquired this pick as the result of a trade on June 20, 1992, that sent a first and fourth-round pick both in 1992 to Toronto in exchange for New York Islanders' second-round pick and a third-round pick both in 1992 and this pick.

=== Round five ===
#	Player	Nationality	NHL team	College/junior/club team
105	Frederik Beaubien (G)	Canada	Los Angeles Kings (from Ottawa via NY Rangers)^{1}	Saint-Hyacinthe Laser (QMJHL)
106	Andrei Buschan (D)	Ukraine	San Jose Sharks	Sokil Kyiv (Ukraine)
107	Ryan Brown (D)	Canada	Tampa Bay Lightning	Swift Current Broncos (WHL)
108	Mikhail Shtalenkov (G)	Russia	Mighty Ducks of Anaheim	Milwaukee Admirals (IHL)
109	Todd MacDonald (G)	Canada	Florida Panthers	Tacoma Rockets (WHL)
110	John Guirestante (RW)	Canada	New Jersey Devils (from Hartford)^{2}	London Knights (OHL)
111	Miroslav Satan (RW)	Slovakia	Edmonton Oilers	Dukla Trencin (Slovakia)
112	Gary Roach (D)	Canada	New York Rangers	Sault Ste. Marie Greyhounds (OHL)
113	Jeff Lank (D)	Canada	Montreal Canadiens (from Dallas)^{3}	Prince Albert Raiders (WHL)
114	Vladimir Krechin (LW)	Russia	Philadelphia Flyers	Traktor Chelyabinsk (Russia)
115	Nolan Pratt (D)	Canada	Hartford Whalers (from St. Louis)^{4}	Portland Winter Hawks (WHL)
116	Richard Safarik (LW)	Slovakia	Buffalo Sabres	AC Nitra (Slovakia)
117	Jason Saal (G)	United States	Los Angeles Kings (from New Jersey)^{5}	Detroit Junior Red Wings (OHL)
118	Tommy Salo (G)	Sweden	New York Islanders	VIK Vasteras HK (Sweden)
119	Larry Courville (LW)	Canada	Winnipeg Jets	Newmarket Royals (OHL)
120	Tomas Vlasak (C)	Czech Republic	Los Angeles Kings	Slavia Prague (Czech Republic)
121	Darryl LaFrance (C)	Canada	Calgary Flames (from Washington)^{6}	Oshawa Generals (OHL)
122	John Emmons (C)	United States	Calgary Flames	Yale University (ECAC)
123	Zdenek Nedved (RW)	Czech Republic	Toronto Maple Leafs	Sudbury Wolves (OHL)
124	Scott Walker (RW)	Canada	Vancouver Canucks (from Vancouver via Hartford)^{7}	Owen Sound Platers (OHL)
125	Dion Darling (D)	Canada	Montreal Canadiens	Spokane Chiefs (WHL)
126	Norm Maracle (G)	Canada	Detroit Red Wings	Saskatoon Blades (WHL)
127	Anders Myrvold (D)	Norway	Quebec Nordiques	Färjestad BK (Sweden)
128	Jonni Vauhkonen (LW)	Finland	Chicago Blackhawks	Reipas Lahti (Finland)
129	Andrei Sapozhnikov (D)	Russia	Boston Bruins	Traktor Chelyabinsk (Russia)
130	Chris Kelleher (D)	United States	Pittsburgh Penguins	Saint Sebastian's School (USHS–MA)

Notes

1. The Ottawa Senators' fifth-round pick went to the Los Angeles Kings as the result of a trade on March 22 that sent John McIntyre to New York in exchange for this pick.
  The New York Rangers previously acquired this pick as the result of a trade on November 5, 1992, that sent Dave Archibald to Ottawa in exchange for this pick.
2. The Hartford Whalers' fifth-round pick went to the New Jersey Devils as the result of a trade on October 3, 1991, that sent Lee Norwood to Hartford in exchange for this pick.
3. The Dallas Stars' fifth-round pick went to the Montreal Canadiens as the result of a trade on August 17, 1992, that sent Mike McPhee to Minnesota in exchange for this pick.
4. The St. Louis Blues' fifth-round pick went to the Hartford Whalers as the result of a trade on November 13, 1991, that sent Lee Norwood to St. Louis in exchange for this pick.
5. The New Jersey Devils' fifth-round pick went to the Los Angeles Kings as the result of a trade on June 26 that sent Corey Millen to New Jersey in exchange for this pick.
6. The Washington Capitals' fifth-round pick went to the Calgary Flames as the result of a trade on June 26 that sent Craig Berube to Washington in exchange for this pick.
7. The Vancouver Canucks' fifth-round pick was re-acquired as the result of a trade on March 22 that sent that sent Robert Kron, future considerations (Jim Sandlak on May 17, 1993) and a third-round pick in 1993 (72nd overall) to Hartford in exchange for Murray Craven, and this pick.
  Hartford previously acquired this pick as the result of a trade on October 1, 1992, that sent Kay Whitmore to Vancouver in exchange for Corrie D'Alessio and this pick (being conditional at the time of the trade).

=== Round six ===
#	Player	Nationality	NHL team	College/junior/club team
131	Rick Bodkin (C)	Canada	Ottawa Senators	Sudbury Wolves (OHL)
132	Petri Varis (LW)	Finland	San Jose Sharks (from San Jose via Dallas)^{1}	Assat (Finland)
133	Kiley Hill (LW)	Canada	Tampa Bay Lightning	Sault Ste Marie Greyhounds (OHL)
134	Antti Aalto (C)	Finland	Mighty Ducks of Anaheim	TPS (Finland)
135	Alain Nasreddine (D)	Canada	Florida Panthers	Drummondville Voltigeurs (QMJHL)
136	Rick Mrozik (D)	United States	Dallas Stars (from Hartford)^{2}	Cloquet High School (USHS–MN)
137	Nicholas Checco (C)	United States	Quebec Nordiques (from Edmonton)^{3}	Bloomington Jefferson High School (USHS–MN)
138	Dave Trofimenkoff (G)	Canada	New York Rangers	Lethbridge Hurricanes (WHL)
139	Per Svartvadet (C)	Sweden	Dallas Stars	MODO (Sweden)
140	Mike Crowley (D)	United States	Philadelphia Flyers	Bloomington Jefferson High School (USHS–MN)
141	Todd Kelman (D)	Canada	St. Louis Blues	Vernon Lakers (BCJHL)
142	Kevin Pozzo (D)	Canada	Buffalo Sabres	Moose Jaw Warriors (WHL)
143	Steve Brule (C)	Canada	New Jersey Devils	Saint-Jean Lynx (QMJHL)
144	Peter Leboutillier (RW)	Canada	New York Islanders	Red Deer Rebels (WHL)
145	Michal Grosek (LW)	Czech Republic	Winnipeg Jets	AC ZPS Zlin (Czech Republic)
146	Jere Karalahti (D)	Finland	Los Angeles Kings	HIFK (Finland)
147	Frank Banham (RW)	Canada	Washington Capitals	Saskatoon Blades (WHL)
148	Andreas Karlsson (C)	Sweden	Calgary Flames	Leksands IF (Sweden)
149	Paul Vincent (C)	United States	Toronto Maple Leafs	Cushing Academy (USHS–MA)
150	Troy Creurer (D)	Canada	Vancouver Canucks	Notre Dame Hounds (SJHL)
151	Darcy Tucker (RW)	Canada	Montreal Canadiens	Kamloops Blazers (WHL)
152	Tim Spitzig (RW)	Canada	Detroit Red Wings (from Detroit via Hartford)^{4}	Kitchener Rangers (OHL)
153	Christian Matte (RW)	Canada	Quebec Nordiques	Granby Bisons (QMJHL)
154	Fredrik Oduya (D)	Sweden	San Jose Sharks (from Chicago)^{5}	Ottawa 67's (OHL)
155	Milt Mastad (D)	Canada	Boston Bruins	Seattle Thunderbirds (WHL)
156	Patrick Lalime (G)	Canada	Pittsburgh Penguins	Shawinigan Cataractes (QMJHL)

Notes

1. The San Jose Sharks' sixth-round pick was re-acquired as the result of a trade on June 26 that sent Dean Evason to Dallas for this pick.
  Dallas previously acquired this pick as the result of a trade on June 20 that sent Gaetan Duchesne to San Jose in exchange for this pick.
2. The Hartford Whalers' sixth-round pick went to the Dallas Stars as the result of a trade on June 15, 1992, that sent Allen Pedersen to Hartford in exchange for this pick (being conditional at the time of the trade).
3. The Edmonton Oilers' sixth-round pick went to the Quebec Nordiques as the result of a trade on June 20 that sent Scott Pearson to Edmonton in exchange for Martin Gelinas and this pick.
4. The Detroit Red Wings' sixth-round pick was re-acquired as the result of a trade on June 1 that sent Brad McCrimmon to Hartford for this pick.
  Hartford previously acquired this pick as the result of a trade on March 22 that sent Steve Konroyd to Detroit in exchange for this pick.
5. The Chicago Blackhawks' sixth-round pick went to the San Jose Sharks as the result of a trade on February 7, 1992, that sent Tony Hrkac to Chicago in exchange for this pick (being conditional at the time of the trade).

=== Round seven ===
#	Player	Nationality	NHL team	College/junior/club team
157	Sergei Polischuk (D)	Russia	Ottawa Senators	Krylya Sovetov (Russia)
158	Anatoli Filatov (RW)	Russia	San Jose Sharks	Torpedo Ust-Kamenogorsk (Kazakhstan)
159	Mathieu Raby (D)	Canada	Tampa Bay Lightning	Victoriaville Tigers (QMJHL)
160	Matt Peterson (D)	United States	Mighty Ducks of Anaheim	Osseo Senior High School (USHS–MN)
161	Trevor Doyle (D)	Canada	Florida Panthers	Kingston Frontenacs (OHL)
162	Sergei Kondrashkin (LW)	Russia	New York Rangers (from Hartford)^{1}	Metallurg Cherepovets (Russia)
163	Aleksandr Zhurik (D)	Belarus	Edmonton Oilers	Dinamo Minsk (Russia)
164	Todd Marchant (C)	United States	New York Rangers	Clarkson University (ECAC)
165	Jeremy Stasiuk (RW)	Canada	Dallas Stars	Spokane Chiefs (WHL)
166	Aaron Israel (G)	United States	Philadelphia Flyers	Harvard University (ECAC)
167	Mike Buzak (G)	Canada	St. Louis Blues	Michigan State University (CCHA)
168	Sergei Petrenko (LW)	Russia	Buffalo Sabres	Dynamo Moscow (Russia)
169	Nikolai Zavarukhin (LW)	Russia	New Jersey Devils	Salavat Yulaev Ufa (Russia)
170	Darren Van Impe (D)	Canada	New York Islanders	Red Deer Rebels (WHL)
171	Martin Woods (D)	Canada	Winnipeg Jets	Victoriaville Tigers (QMJHL)
172	Justin Martin (LW)	United States	Los Angeles Kings	Essex Junction High School (USHS–VT)
173	Dan Hendrickson (RW)	United States	Washington Capitals	St. Paul Vulcans (USHL)
174	Andrew Brunette (LW)	Canada	Washington Capitals (from Calgary)^{2}	Hampton Roads Admirals (ECHL)
175	Jeff Andrews (LW)	Canada	Toronto Maple Leafs	North Bay Centennials (OHL)
176	Yevgeni Bobariko (C)	Russia	Vancouver Canucks	Torpedo Nizhny Novgorod (Russia)
177	David Ruhly (LW)	United States	Montreal Canadiens	Culver Military Academy (USHS–IN)
178	Yuri Yeresko (D)	Russia	Detroit Red Wings	CSKA Moscow (Russia)
179	David Ling (RW)	Canada	Quebec Nordiques	Kingston Frontenacs (OHL)
180	Tom White (C)	United States	Chicago Blackhawks	Westminster School (USHS–CT)
181	Ryan Golden (C)	United States	Boston Bruins	Reading Memorial High School (USHS–MA)
182	Sean Selmser (LW)	Canada	Pittsburgh Penguins	Red Deer Rebels (WHL)

Notes

1. The Hartford Whalers' seventh-round pick went to the New York Rangers as the result of a trade on July 8, 1992, that sent Tim Kerr to Hartford in exchange for this pick.
2. The Calgary Flames' seventh-round pick went to the Washington Capitals as the result of a trade on June 26 that sent Brad Schlegel to Calgary in exchange for this pick.

=== Round eight ===
#	Player	Nationality	NHL team	College/junior/club team
183	Jason Disher (D)	Canada	Ottawa Senators	Kingston Frontenacs (OHL)
184	Todd Holt (RW)	Canada	San Jose Sharks	Swift Current Broncos (WHL)
185	Ryan Nauss (LW)	Canada	Tampa Bay Lightning	Peterborough Petes (OHL)
186	Tom Askey (G)	United States	Mighty Ducks of Anaheim	Ohio State Buckeyes men's ice hockey (CCHA)
187	Briane Thompson (D)	Canada	Florida Panthers	Sault Ste. Marie Greyhounds (OHL)
188	Manny Legace (G)	Canada	Hartford Whalers	Niagara Falls Thunder (OHL)
189	Martin Bakula (D)	Czech Republic	Edmonton Oilers	University of Alaska Anchorage (NCAA Independent)
190	Ed Campbell (D)	United States	New York Rangers	Omaha Lancers (USHL)
191	Rob Lurtsema (LW)	United States	Dallas Stars	Burnsville High School (USHS–MN)
192	Paul Healey (RW)	Canada	Philadelphia Flyers	Prince Albert Raiders (WHL)
193	Eric Boguniecki (C)	United States	St. Louis Blues	Westminster School (USHS–CT)
194	Mike Barrie (C)	Canada	Buffalo Sabres	Victoria Cougars (WHL)
195	Thom Cullen (D)	Canada	New Jersey Devils	Wexford Raiders (MetJHL)
196	Rod Hinks (C)	Canada	New York Islanders	Sudbury Wolves (OHL)
197	Adrian Murray (D)	Canada	Winnipeg Jets	Newmarket Royals (OHL)
198	Travis Dillabough (C)	Canada	Los Angeles Kings	Wexford Raiders (MetJHL)
199	Joel Poirier (LW)	Canada	Washington Capitals	Sudbury Wolves (OHL)
200	Derek Sylvester (RW)	United States	Calgary Flames	Niagara Falls Thunder (OHL)
201	David Brumby (G)	Canada	Toronto Maple Leafs	Tri-City Americans (WHL)
202	Sean Tallaire (RW)	Canada	Vancouver Canucks	Lake Superior State University (CCHA)
203	Alan Letang (D)	Canada	Montreal Canadiens	Newmarket Royals (OHL)
204	Vitezslav Skuta (D)	Czech Republic	Detroit Red Wings	TJ Vitkovice (Czech Republic)
205	Petr Franek (G)	Czech Republic	Quebec Nordiques	Chemopetrol Litvinov (Czech Republic)
206	Sergei Petrov (LW)	Russia	Chicago Blackhawks	Cloquet High School (USHS–MN)
207	Hal Gill (D)	United States	Boston Bruins	Providence College (Hockey East)
208	Larry McMorran (C)	Canada	Pittsburgh Penguins	Seattle Thunderbirds (WHL)

=== Round nine ===
#	Player	Nationality	NHL team	College/junior/club team
209	Toby Kvalevog (G)	United States	Ottawa Senators	Bemidji High School (USHS–MN)
210	Jonas Forsberg (G)	Sweden	San Jose Sharks	Djurgardens IF (Sweden)
211	Alexandre LaPorte (D)	Canada	Tampa Bay Lightning	Victoriaville Tigers (QMJHL)
212	Vitali Kozel (C)	Belarus	Mighty Ducks of Anaheim	Novops (Russia)
213	Chad Cabana (LW)	Canada	Florida Panthers	Tri-City Americans (WHL)
214	Dmitri Gorenko (LW)	Russia	Hartford Whalers	CSKA Moscow (Russia)
215	Brad Norton (D)	United States	Edmonton Oilers	Cushing Academy (USHS–MA)
216	Ken Shepard (G)	Canada	New York Rangers	Oshawa Generals (OHL)
217	Vladimir Potapov (LW)	Russia	Winnipeg Jets (from Dallas)^{1}	Kristall Elektostal (Russia)
218	Tripp Tracy (G)	United States	Philadelphia Flyers	Harvard University (ECAC)
219	Mike Grier (RW)	United States	St. Louis Blues	Saint Sebastian's School (USHS–MA)
220	Barrie Moore (LW)	Canada	Buffalo Sabres	Sudbury Wolves (OHL)
221	Judd Lambert (G)	Canada	New Jersey Devils	Chilliwack Chiefs (BCJHL)
222	Daniel Johansson (D)	Sweden	New York Islanders	Rögle BK (Sweden)
223	Ilya Stashenkov (D)	Russia	Winnipeg Jets	Krylya Sovetov (Russia)
224	Martin Strbak (D)	Slovakia	Los Angeles Kings	ZPA Presov (Slovakia)
225	Jason Gladney (D)	Canada	Washington Capitals	Kitchener Rangers (OHL)
226	E. J. Bradley (C)	United States	Philadelphia Flyers (from Calgary)^{2}	Tabor Academy (USHS–MA)
227	Pavol Demitra (RW)	Slovakia	Ottawa Senators (from Toronto)^{3}	Dukla Trencin (Slovakia)
228	Harijs Vitolinsh (C)	Latvia	Winnipeg Jets (from Vancouver)^{4}	EHC Chur (Switzerland)
229	Alex Duchesne (LW)	Canada	Montreal Canadiens	Drummondville Voltigeurs (QMJHL)
230	Ryan Shanahan (RW)	United States	Detroit Red Wings	Sudbury Wolves (OHL)
231	Vincent Auger (C)	Canada	Quebec Nordiques	Hawkesbury Hawks (CJHL)
232	Mike Rusk (D)	Canada	Chicago Blackhawks	Guelph Storm (OHL)
233	Joel Prpic (C)	Canada	Boston Bruins	Waterloo Black Hawks (USHL)
234	Tim Harberts (C)	United States	Pittsburgh Penguins	Wayzata High School (USHS–MN)

Notes

1. The Dallas Stars' ninth-round pick went to the Winnipeg Jets as the result of a trade on March 20 that sent Mark Osiecki and a tenth-round pick in 1993 (249th overall) to Minnesota in exchange for this pick.
2. The Calgary Flames' ninth-round pick went to the Philadelphia Flyers as the result of a trade on March 18 that sent Greg Paslawski to Calgary in exchange for this pick.
3. The Toronto Maple Leafs' ninth-round pick went to the Ottawa Senators as the result of a trade on February 25 that sent Brad Miller to Toronto in exchange for this pick.
4. The Vancouver Canucks' ninth-round pick went to the Winnipeg Jets as the result of a trade on March 22 that sent Dan Ratushny to Vancouver in exchange for this pick.

=== Round ten ===
#	Player	Nationality	NHL team	College/junior/club team
235	Rick Schuhwerk (D)	United States	Ottawa Senators	Canterbury School (USHS–CT)
236	Jeff Salajko (G)	Canada	San Jose Sharks	Ottawa 67's (OHL)
237	Brett Duncan (D)	Canada	Tampa Bay Lightning	Seattle Thunderbirds (WHL)
238	Anatoli Fedotov (D)	Russia	Mighty Ducks of Anaheim	Krylya Sovetov (Russia)
239	John Demarco (D)	United States	Florida Panthers	Archbishop Williams High School (USHS–MA)
240	Wes Swinson (D)	Canada	Hartford Whalers	Kitchener Rangers (OHL)
241	Oleg Maltsev (LW)	Russia	Edmonton Oilers	Traktor Chelyabinsk (Russia)
242	Andrei Kudinov (RW)	Russia	New York Rangers	Traktor Chelyabinsk (Russia)
243	Jordan Willis (G)	Canada	Dallas Stars	London Knights (OHL)
244	Jeff Staples (D)	Canada	Philadelphia Flyers	Brandon Wheat Kings (WHL)
245	Libor Prochazka (D)	Czech Republic	St. Louis Blues	Poldi SONP Kladno (Czech Republic)
246	Chris Davis (G)	Canada	Buffalo Sabres	Calgary Royals (AJHL)
247	Jimmy Provencher (RW)	Canada	New Jersey Devils	Saint-Jean Lynx (QMJHL)
248	Stephane Larocque (RW)	Canada	New York Islanders	Sherbrooke Faucons (QMJHL)
249	Bill Lang (C)	Canada	Dallas Stars (from Winnipeg)^{1}	North Bay Centennials (OHL)
250	Kimmo Timonen (D)	Finland	Los Angeles Kings	KalPa (Finland)
251	Marc Seliger (G)	Germany	Washington Capitals	Starbulls Rosenheim (Germany)
252	German Titov (C)	Russia	Calgary Flames	TPS (Finland)
253	Kyle Ferguson (RW)	Canada	Toronto Maple Leafs	Michigan Technological University (WCHA)
254	Bert Robertsson (D)	Sweden	Vancouver Canucks	Sodertalje SK (Sweden)
255	Brian Larochelle (G)	United States	Montreal Canadiens	Phillips Exeter Academy (USHS–NH)
256	Jamie Kosecki (G)	United States	Detroit Red Wings	Berkshire School (USHS–MA)
257	Mark Pivetz (D)	Canada	Quebec Nordiques	Saskatoon Titans (SJHL)
258	Mike McGhan (LW)	Canada	Chicago Blackhawks	Prince Albert Raiders (WHL)
259	Joakim Persson (G)	Sweden	Boston Bruins	Hammarby IF (Sweden)
260	Leonid Toropchenko (C)	Russia	Pittsburgh Penguins	CSKA Moscow (Russia)

Notes

1. The Winnipeg Jets' tenth-round pick went to the Dallas Stars as the result of a trade on March 20 that sent a ninth-round pick in 1993 (217th overall) to Winnipeg in exchange for Mark Osiecki and this pick.

=== Round eleven ===
#	Player	Nationality	NHL team	College/junior/club team
261	Pavel Komarov (D)	Russia	New York Rangers (from Ottawa)^{1}	Torpedo Nizhny Novgorod (Russia)
262	Jamie Matthews (C)	Canada	San Jose Sharks	Sudbury Wolves (OHL)
263	Mark Szoke (LW)	Canada	Tampa Bay Lightning	Lethbridge Hurricanes (WHL)
264	David Penney (LW)	United States	Mighty Ducks of Anaheim	Worcester Academy (USHS–MA)
265	Eric Montreuil (C)	Canada	Florida Panthers	Chicoutimi Saguenéens (QMJHL)
266	Igor Chibirev (C)	Ukraine	Hartford Whalers	Fort Wayne Komets (IHL)
267	Ilya Byakin (D)	Russia	Edmonton Oilers	EV Landshut (Germany)
268	Maxim Smelnitsky (C)	Russia	New York Rangers	Traktor Chelyabinsk (Russia)
269	Cory Peterson (D)	United States	Dallas Stars	Bloomington Jefferson High School (USHS–MA)
270	Ken Hemenway (D)	United States	Philadelphia Flyers	Alaska All-Stars (AAAAHA)
271	Alexander Vasilevski (RW)	Ukraine	St. Louis Blues	Victoria Cougars (WHL)
272	Scott Nichol (C)	Canada	Buffalo Sabres	Portland Winter Hawks (WHL)
273	Mike Legg (RW)	Canada	New Jersey Devils	London Nationals (WJBHL)
274	Carl Charland (LW)	Canada	New York Islanders	Hull Olympiques (QMJHL)
275	Christer Olsson (D)	Sweden	St. Louis Blues (from Winnipeg)^{2}	Brynas IF (Sweden)
276	Patrick Howald (LW)	Switzerland	Los Angeles Kings	HC Lugano (Switzerland)
277	Dany Bousquet (C)	Canada	Washington Capitals	Penticton Panthers (BCJHL)
278	Burke Murphy (LW)	Canada	Calgary Flames	St. Lawrence University (ECAC)
279	Mikhail Lapin (D)	Russia	Toronto Maple Leafs	Western Michigan University (CCHA)
280	Sergei Tkachenko (G)	Ukraine	Vancouver Canucks	CSKA Kyiv (Ukraine)
281	Russ Guzior (C)	United States	Montreal Canadiens	Culver Military Academy (USHS–IN)
282	Gordy Hunt (C)	United States	Detroit Red Wings	Detroit Compuware Ambassadors (NAHL)
283	John Hillman (C)	United States	Quebec Nordiques	St. Paul Vulcans (USHL)
284	Tom Noble (G)	United States	Chicago Blackhawks	Catholic Memorial School (USHS–MA)
285	Russell Hewson (LW)	Canada	Winnipeg Jets (from Boston via Chicago)^{3}	Swift Current Broncos (WHL)
286	Hans Jonsson (D)	Sweden	Pittsburgh Penguins	MODO (Sweden)

Notes

1. The Ottawa Senators' eleventh-round pick went to the New York Rangers as the result of a trade on June 20, 1992, that sent an eleventh-round pick in 1992 to Ottawa in exchange for future considerations (this pick on May 7, 1993).
2. The Winnipeg Jets' eleventh-round pick went to the St. Louis Blues as the result of a trade on June 20, 1992, that sent an eleventh-round pick in 1992 to Winnipeg in exchange for this pick.
3. The Boston Bruins' eleventh-round pick went to the Winnipeg Jets as the result of a trade on February 21 that sent Troy Murray to Chicago in exchange for Steve Bancroft and this pick.
  Chicago previously acquired this pick as the result of a trade on January 8, 1992, that sent an eleventh-round pick in 1992 to Boston in exchange for Steve Bancroft and this pick.

== Draftees based on nationality ==
Rank	Country	Amount
	North America	193
1	Canada	137
2	United States	56
	Europe	93
3	Russia	34
4	Sweden	18
5	Czech Republic	14
6	Finland	8
7	Ukraine	5
8	Slovakia	4
9	Belarus	3
10	Latvia	2
10	Poland	2
12	Germany	1
12	Norway	1
12	Switzerland	1

== See also ==
- 1993 NHL expansion draft
- 1993 NHL supplemental draft
- 1993–94 NHL season
- List of NHL players
