= Jennifer Provencher =

Canadian conservation biologist

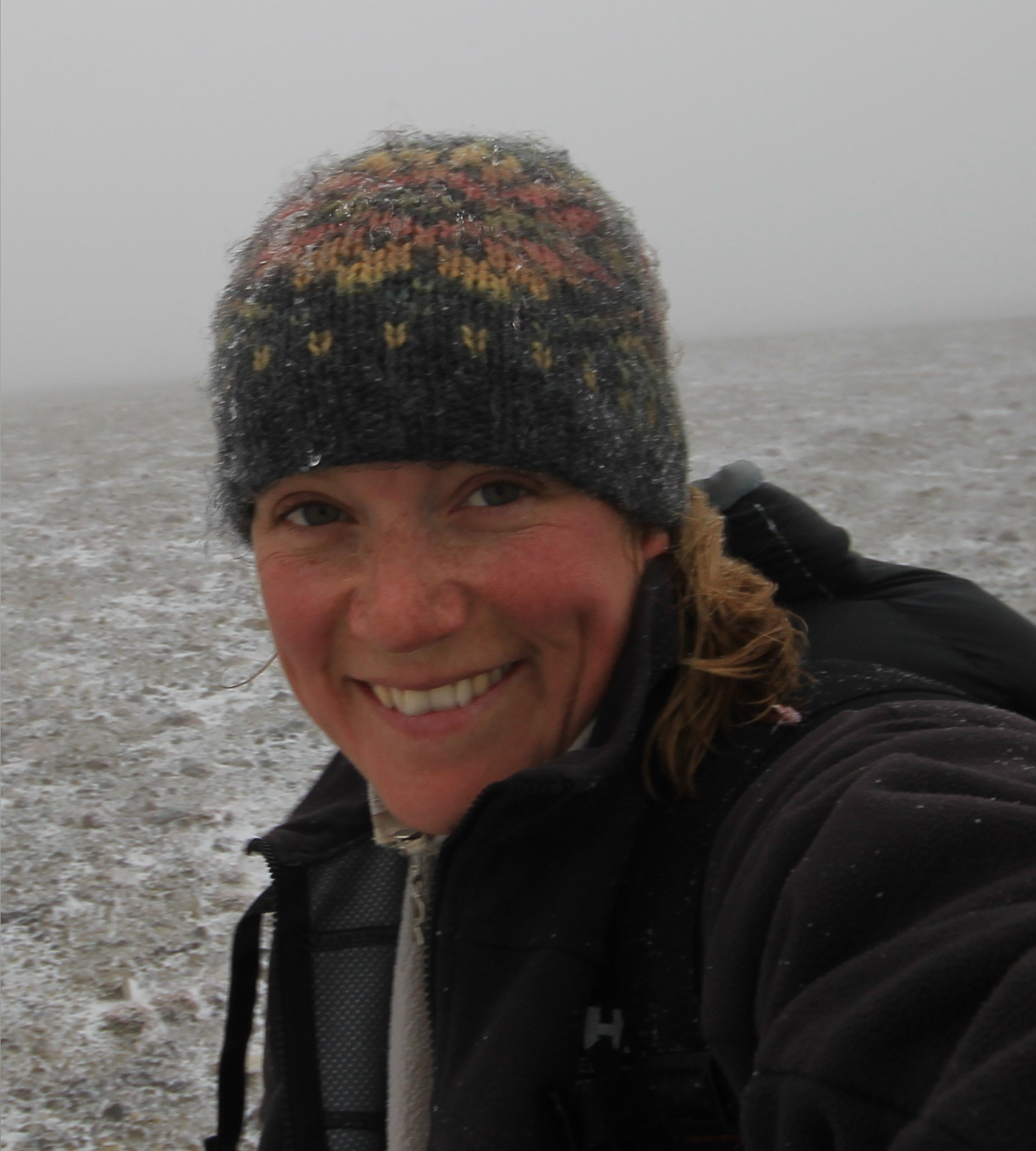
- Born: October 22, 1979 (age 46)
- Education: B.Sc. University of British Columbia, British Columbia B.Ed. University of British Columbia, British Columbia M.Sc. University of Victoria Ph.D. Carleton University
- Website: jenniferprovencher.com

Jennifer F. Provencher (born 22 October 1979) is a Canadian conservation biologist. She is an early-career researcher and a spokesperson for the awareness of plastic contaminants in marine wildlife, pollution and climate change. Many of her work focus on the impact of human activities on the health of Arctic seabirds and marine ecosystems.

== Education ==
Provencher received her B.Sc. in Marine Biology and her B.Ed. in Senior Sciences and Biology from the University of British Columbia. She then received a M.Sc. from the University of Victoria for her work on seabirds as indicators of change in the eastern Canadian Arctic. Her Ph.D. in Biology (Environmental and Chemical Toxicology) at Carleton University focused on parasites and mercury as possible drivers of avian health and reproduction.

She received a W. Garfield Weston Post-doctoral Fellowship in 2016 and a Liber Ero Post-doctoral Fellowship in 2018 to work in Northern Research at Acadia University.

== Work ==
=== Before 2010: Career foundation ===
After graduating with a Bachelor's degree in Marine Biology and Education in 2004, Provencher taught and assisted in research projects at the Bamfield Marine Sciences Centre on Vancouver Island, Canada as a teacher and a scientific diver. In 2008, she decided to return to school to pursue a M.Sc. at the University of Victoria.

=== 2010-2018: Early career stage ===
In 2010, Provencher worked with the Association of Polar Early Career Scientists (APECS) in association with the International Arctic Science Committee (IASC) and the Scientific Committee on Antarctic Research (SCAR) to lead the education and outreach assessment of activities conducted during the 2007-2009 International Polar Year. In the following years, she once again returned to graduate school as she undertook a Ph.D. at Carleton University, and she remained engaged as a member of the APECS executive committee and guest poster.

Provencher has acted as committee chair or organizer for several international conferences, including the 2012 Inuit Studies Conference APECS workshop, Washington DC, USA; the 2013 ArcticNet Annual Science Meeting, Halifax, Canada and the 2018 Arctic Biodiversity Congress, Helsinki, Finland.

Between 2014 and 2019, Provencher gave over two dozen invited presentations all around the world on various topics related to contaminants or northern studies, among others. Some of the organizations that invited her included the American Academy for the Advancement of Science (AAAS) and the Canada Science and Technology Museums Corporation. In 2019, she was among the scientists invited to speak in a joint Canada-Monaco-France event on plastic pollution in the environment, namely at Maison Des Oceans, Paris, and the Oceanographic Museum of Monaco, Monaco. That same year, she was called upon to testify in front of the Canadian Senate Committee on the Arctic and speak at the Belfer School for Science and International Affairs at Harvard University. Some of her other invited speeches were at the 2012 University of the Arctic Communications Workshop, Tromsø, Norway. She has been nominated to represent the Arctic Monitoring and Assessment Programme (AMAP) at planning group for the April 2020 International Symposium on Plastics in the Arctic and Sub‐Arctic Region, Reykjavik, Iceland.

=== 2018-present: Career advancement ===
Since 2018, Provencher is Head of the Wildlife Health Unit at the Canadian Wildlife Service (Environment and Climate Change Canada), and her work focuses on the effect of diseases, parasites and contaminants on the conservation of wildlife. As of 2019, she is an adjunct researcher at three Canadian universities: Carleton University, Ottawa, Ontario; Acadia University, Wolfville, Nova Scotia; and Memorial University of Newfoundland, St. John's, Newfoundland, Canada.

== Significant contributions ==
Part of the Circumpolar Arctic Flora and Fauna (CAFF) working group, under the Arctic Council, Provencher was coordinator for the Arctic Migratory Bird Initiative (AMBI). She worked with member and observer states to coordinate and implement conservation efforts for breeding birds throughout international flyways. She established a task force focused on the illegal killing of migratory waterbirds in the East Asian Australasian Flyway. This task force currently works to identify major sources of mortality in birds in the East Asian Australasian Flyway, and cooperate with local organizations and national governments to minimize the negative effects on bird populations. At the 2017 Conference of the Parties in Manila, Philippines, she also co-lead the development of the initiative into a more comprehensive task force for all birds under the Convention for Migratory Species (CMS). She worked with communicators to inform and engage policy makers with research and science.

Provencher collaborated on a research program to develop a Canadian ingested plastic research framework used to monitor plastic ingestion in seabirds and investigate questions related to the impact of plastic pollution on marine wildlife. She further co-developed and co-lead related workshops such as the Learning about Ringed Seal Health from Contaminants Science and Inuit Qaujimajatuqangit to further inform Inuit communities about contaminants while meshing with Inuit Knowledge and science. The ongoing community-based science communication program is now co-led by the Government of Nunatsiavut.

Aside from her numerous peer-reviewed publications as a researcher, Provencher is an author for several book chapters and gray literature articles, some of which were about the challenges of women and early career researchers in the science community.

== Awards and recognition ==
Provencher has received numerous awards as a researcher and educator. The following are selected awards.

- 2018: Liber Ero Post-doctoral Fellowship
- 2018: NSERC Post-doctoral Fellowship
- 2016, 2017: W. Garfield Weston Post-Doctoral Fellowship in Northern Research
- 2014: Jennifer Robinson Memorial Award, Arctic Institute of North America
- 2014, 2015, 2016: Bonnycastle Fellowship in Wetland and Waterfowl Biology, Ducks Unlimited Canada
- 2013: Lorraine Allison Memorial Award, Arctic Institute of North America
- 2013: W. Garfield Weston Award for Northern Research (PhD)

== Media and outreach ==
Provencher has presence in various radio, television and interviews with local, national and international outlets. This includes Newsweek, Maclean's, CBC, and The Guardian. The following are selected media and outreach activities.

In 2011, her work on plastic assessment in northern marine birds, “Plenty of plastics in Canada’s Arctic birds” was written by Margaret Munro, science writer and journalist.

In 2012, the Aboriginal Affairs and Northern development Canada (AANDC) produced a video featuring Provencher’s work with Inuit to study Eider Ducks. Provencher was also featured in Duck’s Unlimited’s magazine, The Conservator, for this Fellowship winning work. In 2015, the Smithsonian magazine featured Provencher in an article highlighting how seabirds act as vectors of marine contaminants dumped back on land.

She was then interviewed in 2017 for CBC reports on the billions of plastic particles brought into Arctic waters through the ocean ‘conveyor belt’.

In 2018, Provencher and the minister of Environment and Climate Change, Catherine McKenna, visited Nova Scotia, as they discussed plastic pollution and its threat to seabirds and the Atlantic coast. The minister later expressed her pride to have worked with such a dedicated public servant as Provencher, mentioning that Provencher's talk about work-life balance was an important message.

That same year, she was part of a CBC radio coverage about a UK ban of plastic straw and other single use items and what could be done in Canada, titled "'We need to rethink the entire plastics industry': Why banning plastic straw isn't enough."

In 2019, she was featured in a Maclean's article "Is That My Plastic Bag in the Mariana Trench?" and was one of three guest plastic researchers part of a live panel discussion about the plastics in the oceans at the 2019 Advancement of Science meeting, Washington, D.C.
