= Jimmy Provencher =

Canadian ice hockey right winger

- Born: March 22, 1975 (age 51) Kitchener, Ontario, Canada
- Height: 6 ft 4 in (193 cm)
- Weight: 216 lb (98 kg; 15 st 6 lb)
- Position: Right wing
- Shot: Right
- Played for: Lions de Lyon; Drakkars de Caen; Lukko; EC Kapfenberg; Scorpions de Mulhouse; Dragons de Rouen; Albatros de Brest
- NHL draft: 247th overall, 1993; New Jersey Devils
- Playing career: 1996–2008

Jimmy Provencher (born March 22, 1975) is a Canadian former professional ice hockey right winger.

Provencher was drafted 247th overall by the New Jersey Devils in the 1993 NHL entry draft but never played in the NHL. He instead spent the majority of his career in Europe, mainly in France for Lions de Lyon, Drakkars de Caen, Scorpions de Mulhouse, Dragons de Rouen and Albatros de Brest. He also played in the SM-liiga for Lukko and the Austrian Hockey League for EC Kapfenberg.
