= Vladimir Chebaturkin =

Russian ice hockey player (born 1975)

- Born: April 23, 1975 (age 51) Tyumen, Russian SFSR, Soviet Union
- Height: 6 ft 3 in (191 cm)
- Weight: 218 lb (99 kg; 15 st 8 lb)
- Position: Defence
- Shot: Left
- Played for: New York Islanders; St. Louis Blues; Chicago Blackhawks; Ak Bars Kazan; Neftekhimik Nizhnekamsk; Amur Khabarovsk
- NHL draft: 66th overall, 1993; New York Islanders
- Playing career: 1991–2009

Vladimir Alexandrovich Chebaturkin (Russian: Владимир Александрович Чебатуркин; born 23 April 1975) is a Russian former ice hockey player who played 62 games in the National Hockey League for the New York Islanders, St. Louis Blues and the Chicago Blackhawks between 1998 and 2002. He was drafted 66th overall by the Islanders in the 1993 NHL entry draft and went on to play 62 games, scoring 2 goals and 7 assists for 9 points and collecting 52 penalty minutes. The rest of his career, which lasted from 1991 to 2009, was spent in the minor leagues and the Russian Superleague.

After retiring as a player, Chebaturkin served as an assistant coach for Kontinental Hockey League's Atlant Mytishchi, Avangard Omsk and HC CSKA Moscow. He is later served as head coach of Zvezda Moscow of the Supreme Hockey League between 2018 and 2022.

== Career statistics ==
=== Regular season and playoffs ===
			Regular season					Playoffs
Season	Team	League	GP	G	A	Pts	PIM	GP	G	A	Pts	PIM
1991–92	Kristall Elektrostal	USSR-2	27	0	0	0	4	—	—	—	—	—
1992–93	Kristall Elektrostal	RUS-2	42	4	4	8	38	—	—	—	—	—
1993–94	Kristall Elektrostal	RUS-2	42	4	4	8	38	—	—	—	—	—
1994–95	Kristall Elektrostal	RUS	52	2	6	8	90	—	—	—	—	—
1995–96	Kristall Elektrostal	RUS	44	1	6	7	30	1	0	0	0	0
1996–97	Utah Grizzlies	IHL	68	0	4	4	34	—	—	—	—	—
1997–98	New York Islanders	NHL	2	0	2	2	0	—	—	—	—	—
1997–98	Kentucky Thoroughblades	AHL	54	6	8	14	52	2	0	0	0	4
1998–99	New York Islanders	NHL	8	0	0	0	12	—	—	—	—	—
1998–99	Lowell Lock Monsters	AHL	69	2	12	14	85	—	—	—	—	—
1999–00	New York Islanders	NHL	17	1	1	2	8	—	—	—	—	—
1999–00	Lowell Lock Monsters	AHL	63	1	8	9	118	—	—	—	—	—
2000–01	Worcester IceCats	AHL	33	0	7	7	73	10	1	0	1	10
2000–01	St. Louis Blues	NHL	22	1	2	3	26	—	—	—	—	—
2001–02	Chicago Blackhawks	NHL	13	0	2	2	6	3	0	0	0	2
2001–02	Norfolk Admirals	AHL	57	2	8	10	78	—	—	—	—	—
2002–03	Hartford Wolf Pack	AHL	53	4	3	7	88	—	—	—	—	—
2003–04	Ak Bars Kazan	RSL	42	1	2	3	38	3	0	0	0	2
2004–05	Neftekhimik Nizhnekamsk	RSL	58	3	5	8	62	3	0	0	0	2
2005–06	Neftekhimik Nizhnekamsk	RSL	38	0	2	2	70	2	0	0	0	4
2006–07	Amur Khabarovsk	RSL	31	0	1	1	34	—	—	—	—	—
2007–08	Amur Khabarovsk	RSL	32	1	1	2	73	4	0	0	0	4
2008–09	Neftekhimik Nizhnekamsk	KHL	11	0	0	0	12	—	—	—	—	—
RSL/KHL totals			308	8	23	31	419	13	0	0	0	12
NHL totals			62	2	7	9	52	3	0	0	0	2

=== International ===
Year	Team	Event	GP	G	A	Pts	PIM
1993	Russia	EJC	5	0	1	1	0
1995	Russia	WJC	7	0	2	2	2
Junior totals			12	0	3	3	2
