= Ruslan Batyrshin =

Russian ice hockey player (born 1975)

- Born: February 19, 1975 (age 51) Moscow, Soviet Union
- Height: 6 ft 1 in (185 cm)
- Weight: 185 lb (84 kg; 13 st 3 lb)
- Position: Defence
- Shot: Left
- Played for: Dynamo Moscow; Los Angeles Kings; Avangard Omsk; Krylya Sovetov Moscow; Sibir Novosibirsk
- NHL draft: 79th overall, 1993; Winnipeg Jets
- Playing career: 1993–2004

Ruslan Alievich Batyrshin (Russian: Руслан Алиевич Батыршин; born February 19, 1975) is a Russian former professional hockey player. He played 2 games in the National Hockey League with the Los Angeles Kings during the 1995–96 season. The rest of his career, which lasted from 1991 to 2005, was mainly spent in Russia. Batyrshin was drafted by the Winnipeg Jets in the 4th round of the 1993 NHL entry draft. He is an ethnic Tatar. As a youth, he played in the 1989 Quebec International Pee-Wee Hockey Tournament with a minor ice hockey team from Moscow. His brother, Rafael, also played hockey.

== Career statistics ==
=== Regular season and playoffs ===
			Regular season					Playoffs
Season	Team	League	GP	G	A	Pts	PIM	GP	G	A	Pts	PIM
1991–92	Dynamo Moscow-2	USSR-3	40	0	2	2	52	—	—	—	—	—
1992–93	Dynamo Moscow-2	RUS-2	55	5	3	8	96	—	—	—	—	—
1993–94	Dynamo Moscow	IHL	19	0	0	0	10	3	0	0	0	22
1993–94	Dynamo Moscow-2	RUS-3	13	0	2	2	18	—	—	—	—	—
1994–95	Dynamo Moscow	IHL	36	2	2	4	65	12	1	1	2	6
1994–95	Dynamo Moscow-2	RUS-2	11	0	1	1	20	—	—	—	—	—
1995–96	Los Angeles Kings	NHL	2	0	0	0	6	—	—	—	—	—
1995–96	Phoenix Roadrunners	IHL	71	1	9	10	144	2	0	0	0	2
1996–97	Phoenix Roadrunners	IHL	59	3	4	7	123	—	—	—	—	—
1997–98	Grand Rapids Griffins	IHL	22	0	2	2	54	—	—	—	—	—
1997–98	Springfield Falcons	AHL	47	0	6	6	130	—	—	—	—	—
1998–99	Dynamo Moscow	RSL	29	0	4	4	42	15	0	1	1	16
1998–99	Dynamo Moscow-2	RUS-2	1	0	1	1	2	—	—	—	—	—
1999–00	Anchorage Aces	WCHL	61	5	7	22	243	4	0	1	1	10
2000–01	Avangard Omsk	RSL	31	1	2	3	36	16	0	1	1	28
2001–02	Krylya Sovetov Moscow	RSL	25	0	1	1	66	—	—	—	—	—
2001–02	Avangard Omsk	RSL	7	0	1	1	26	9	0	0	0	2
2001–02	Avangard-VDV Omsk	RUS-3	2	1	2	3	0	—	—	—	—	—
2002–03	Anchorage Aces	WCHL	59	2	6	8	252	—	—	—	—	—
2003–04	Sibir Novosibirsk	RSL	39	0	2	2	103	—	—	—	—	—
NHL totals			2	0	0	0	6	—	—	—	—	—
RSL totals			131	1	10	11	273	40	0	2	2	40

=== International ===
Year	Team	Event	GP	G	A	Pts	PIM
1993	Russia	EJC	6	1	2	3	8
1995	Russia	WJC	7	1	4	5	10
Junior totals			13	2	6	8	18
