= Rafael Batyrshin =

Russian ice hockey player (born 1986)

- Born: August 26, 1986 (age 38); Moscow, Russian SFSR, USSR
- Height: 6 ft 2 in (188 cm)
- Weight: 212 lb (96 kg; 15 st 2 lb)
- Position: Defence
- Shoots: Left
- KHL team Former teams: Free agent Krylya Sovetov; HC Vityaz; Atlant Moscow Oblast; HC Sibir Novosibirsk; Metallurg Magnitogorsk; Ak Bars Kazan; Avtomobilist Yekaterinburg; HC Sochi; Amur Khabarovsk
- Playing career: 2003–present

Rafael Batyrshin (Tatar: Рафаил Батыршин, born August 26, 1986) is a Russian professional ice hockey defenseman who is currently an unrestricted free agent. He most recently played under contract with Amur Khabarovsk in the Kontinental Hockey League (KHL). As a journeyman blueliner, Batyrshin has formerly played in the KHL with HC Vityaz, Atlant Moscow Oblast, HC Sibir Novosibirsk, Metallurg Magnitogorsk, Ak Bars Kazan and HC Sochi. He previously joined Magnitogorsk on May 7, 2014, agreeing to a two-year contract as a free agent. His brother, Ruslan, also played hockey.

== Career statistics ==
			Regular season					Playoffs
Season	Team	League	GP	G	A	Pts	PIM	GP	G	A	Pts	PIM
2003–04	Krylya Sovetov	RUS-2	9	0	2	2	2	3	0	0	0	2
2004–05	Krylya Sovetov	RUS-2	36	0	1	1	18	—	—	—	—	—
2005–06	Krylya Sovetov	RUS-2	33	0	1	1	22	5	0	0	0	8
2006–07	Krylya Sovetov	RSL	28	0	1	1	48	—	—	—	—	—
2007–08	HC Ryazan	RUS-2	14	0	2	2	36	—	—	—	—	—
2007–08	Krylya Sovetov	RUS-2	22	1	3	4	36	3	1	1	2	2
2008–09	MHC Krylya	RUS-2	55	4	8	12	100	15	3	5	8	26
2009–10	HC Vityaz	KHL	48	3	4	7	64	—	—	—	—	—
2010–11	HC Vityaz	KHL	47	2	7	9	73	—	—	—	—	—
2011–12	Atlant Moscow Oblast	KHL	33	2	6	8	68	—	—	—	—	—
2011–12	HC Sibir Novosibirsk	KHL	10	0	3	3	10	—	—	—	—	—
2012–13	HC Sibir Novosibirsk	KHL	1	0	0	0	2	—	—	—	—	—
2012–13	HC Ryazan	VHL	6	0	1	1	12	—	—	—	—	—
2012–13	Atlant Moscow Oblast	KHL	34	3	5	8	36	5	0	0	0	4
2013–14	Atlant Moscow Oblast	KHL	53	6	9	15	105	—	—	—	—	—
2014–15	Metallurg Magnitogorsk	KHL	37	4	9	13	64	9	0	1	1	0
2015–16	Metallurg Magnitogorsk	KHL	55	1	4	5	74	17	0	0	0	24
2016–17	Ak Bars Kazan	KHL	17	1	2	3	8	15	0	3	3	10
2016–17	Bars Kazan	VHL	7	0	2	2	6	—	—	—	—	—
2017–18	Ak Bars Kazan	KHL	34	0	3	3	30	19	0	0	0	8
2018–19	Ak Barrs Kazan	KHL	51	4	6	10	58	—	—	—	—	—
2019–20	Avtomobilist Yekaterinburg	KHL	28	3	3	6	20	5	0	0	0	2
2020–21	HC Sochi	KHL	39	1	2	3	62	—	—	—	—	—
2021–22	HC Ryazan	VHL	6	0	2	2	4	—	—	—	—	—
2022–23	Amur Khabarovsk	KHL	41	0	1	1	18	—	—	—	—	—
KHL totals			528	30	64	94	692	70	0	4	4	48

== Awards and honours ==
Award	Year
KHL
Gagarin Cup (Metallurg Magnitogorsk)	2016
Gagarin Cup (Ak Bars Kazan)	2018
