= Emil Axelsson (ice hockey) =

Swedish ice hockey defenseman

- Born: 19 March 1986 (age 40) Örebro, Sweden, SWE
- Height: 6 ft 3 in (191 cm)
- Weight: 207 lb (94 kg; 14 st 11 lb)
- Position: Defence
- Shot: Left
- NHL team (P) Cur. team: New York Islanders; Örebro HK (Allsvenskan)
- NHL draft: 210th overall (7th round), 2004; New York Islanders
- Playing career: 2004–2011

Emil Axelsson (born 19 March 1986) is a Swedish ice hockey defenseman, who currently plays for Örebro HK in the second highest league in Sweden. In the 2004 NHL Draft, he was picked in the 7th round by the New York Islanders. He was drafted by the Islanders' former general manager, Mike Milbury. He is a defense-minded and physical player and spends a lot of time in the penalty box. He spent 240 minutes in the box in just 152 career games through the 2006–07 season.

== Career statistics ==
=== Regular season and playoffs ===
			Regular season					Playoffs
Season	Team	League	GP	G	A	Pts	PIM	GP	G	A	Pts	PIM
2002–03	HC Örebro 90	SWE.2 U20	—	—	—	—	—	3	1	0	1	2
2003–04	HC Örebro 90	SWE.2 U20
2003–04	HC Örebro 90	Allsv	42	4	0	4	83	—	—	—	—	—
2004–05	Linköpings HC	J20	21	1	0	1	32	—	—	—	—	—
2005–06	IFK Arboga	Allsv	39	1	2	3	30	—	—	—	—	—
2006–07	Linköpings HC	SEL	2	0	0	0	0	—	—	—	—	—
2006–07	IFK Arboga	Allsv	38	1	5	6	85	—	—	—	—	—
2006–07	Västerås IK	Allsv	5	0	0	0	2	2	0	0	0	0
2007–08	Västerås IK	Allsv	44	0	5	5	139	10	0	0	0	12
2008–09	Västerås IK	Allsv	8	0	0	0	2	—	—	—	—	—
2008–09	IFK Arboga	SWE.3	3	1	0	1	4	—	—	—	—	—
2009–10	Örebro HK	Allsv	44	0	2	2	55	—	—	—	—	—
2010–11	Örebro HK	Allsv	48	1	1	2	22	8	2	0	2	6
Allsv totals			268	7	15	22	418	20	2	0	2	18
SEL totals			2	0	0	0	0	—	—	—	—	—

=== International ===
Year	Team	Event	GP	G	A	Pts	PIM
2004	Sweden	WJC18	5	0	0	0	8
Junior totals			5	0	0	0	8
