= Daniel Glimmenvall =

Swedish ice hockey player (born 1974)

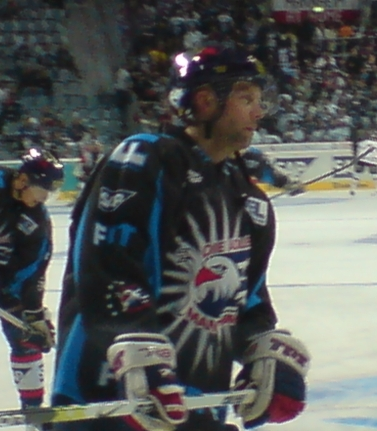
- Born: September 10, 1974 (age 51) Glimåkra, SWE
- Height: 5 ft 11 in (180 cm)
- Weight: 194 lb (88 kg; 13 st 12 lb)
- Position: Defence
- Shot: Right
- Played for: Adler Mannheim (DEL); Brynäs IF (SEL); Lahti Pelicans (SML); HV71 (SEL); Rögle BK (SEL)
- NHL draft: 222nd overall, 1993; New York Islanders
- Playing career: 1991–2012

Daniel Glimmenvall (born September 10, 1974) is a Swedish professional ice hockey player. He was formerly known as Daniel Johansson until 2009.

Currently, he is the captain of Rögle BK in the Swedish Allsvenskan.

== Career statistics ==
			Regular season					Playoffs
Season	Team	League	GP	G	A	Pts	PIM	GP	G	A	Pts	PIM
1990–91	Rögle BK J18	J18 Elit	—	—	—	—	—	—	—	—	—	—
1990–91	Rögle BK J20	Juniorserien	—	—	—	—	—	—	—	—	—	—
1991–92	Rögle BK J18	J18 Elit	2	0	2	2	4	—	—	—	—	—
1991–92	Rögle BK J20	Juniorserien	—	—	—	—	—	—	—	—	—	—
1991–92	Rögle BK	Division 1	33	4	9	13	30	5	1	1	2	6
1992–93	Rögle BK J20	Juniorallsvenskan	5	0	1	1	4	—	—	—	—	—
1992–93	Rögle BK	Elitserien	28	2	4	6	20	—	—	—	—	—
1993–94	Rögle BK	Eitserien	37	5	10	15	34	3	0	0	0	0
1994–95	Rögle BK J20	J20 SuperElit	1	0	1	1	2	—	—	—	—	—
1994–95	Rögle BK	Elitserien	22	4	3	7	16	—	—	—	—	—
1994–95	Rögle BK	Allsvenskan D1	18	2	8	10	4	11	2	2	4	6
1995–96	HV71	Elitserien	40	3	5	8	24	4	0	1	1	0
1996–97	HV71	Elitserien	50	8	7	15	30	5	0	1	1	2
1997–98	HV71	Elitserien	46	3	9	12	32	5	2	0	2	6
1998–99	HV71	Elitserien	50	5	7	12	46	—	—	—	—	—
1999–00	Lahti Pelicans	SM-liiga	43	5	7	12	28	—	—	—	—	—
2000–01	Brynäs IF	Elitserien	50	5	9	14	44	4	1	0	1	2
2001–02	Brynäs IF J20	J20 SuperElit	1	1	1	2	0	—	—	—	—	—
2001–02	Brynäs IF	Elitserien	37	0	7	7	36	4	0	0	0	4
2002–03	Brynäs IF	Elitserien	50	6	9	15	32	—	—	—	—	—
2003–04	Brynäs IF	Elitserien	49	6	6	12	32	—	—	—	—	—
2004–05	Brynäs IF	Elitserien	45	1	4	5	28	—	—	—	—	—
2005–06	Brynäs IF	Elitserien	50	5	10	15	34	4	0	1	1	6
2006–07	Brynäs IF	Elitserien	53	5	6	11	52	7	1	5	6	8
2007–08	Brynäs IF	Elitserien	34	3	6	9	30	—	—	—	—	—
2007–08	Adler Mannheim	DEL	11	0	2	2	4	5	0	0	0	0
2008–09	Rögle BK	Elitserien	53	3	17	20	36	—	—	—	—	—
2009–10	Rögle BK	Elitserien	50	3	16	19	50	—	—	—	—	—
2010–11	Rögle BK	HockeyAllsvenskan	46	6	22	28	24	9	2	5	7	6
2011–12	Rögle BK	HockeyAllsvenskan	46	5	17	22	26	10	1	1	2	4
Elitserien totals			744	67	135	202	576	36	4	8	12	28
