= List of New Jersey Devils draft picks =

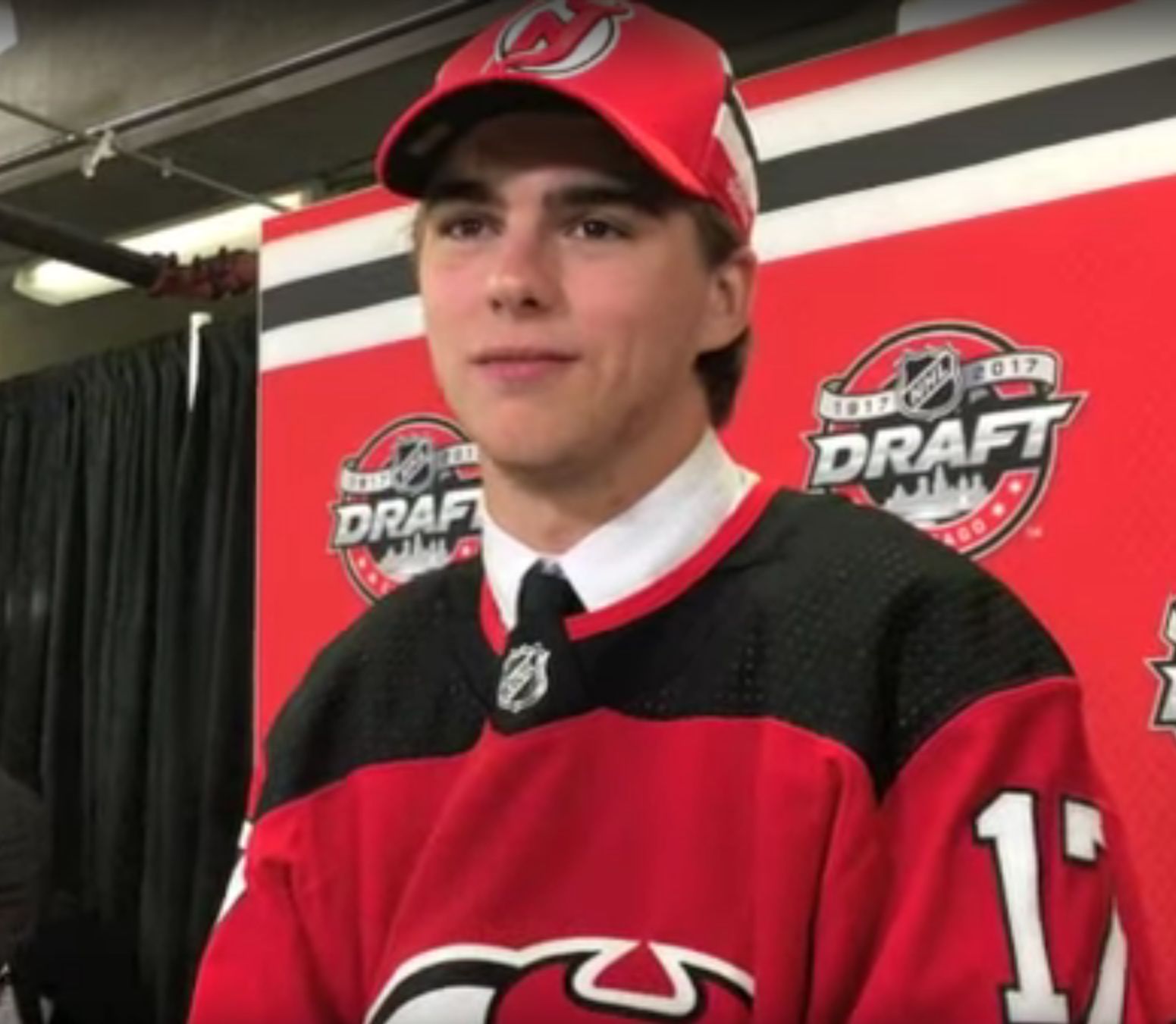
Nico Hischier became the Devils' first ever first overall pick in 2017.

The New Jersey Devils are a professional ice hockey team based in Newark, New Jersey. The club was founded in Kansas City, Missouri, as the Kansas City Scouts in 1974, moved to Denver, as the Colorado Rockies after only two seasons, and then settled in New Jersey in 1982.

New Jersey's first draft pick was Rocky Trottier, taken eighth overall in the 1982 NHL entry draft, while 18 picks would go on to play over 1,000 NHL games – Brendan Shanahan, Pat Verbeek, Kirk Muller, Ken Daneyko, Martin Brodeur, Scott Niedermayer, Brian Rolston, Patrik Elias, John MacLean, Bill Guerin, Eric Weinrich, Scott Gomez, Zach Parise, Travis Zajac, Brian Gionta, Petr Sykora, Steve Sullivan, and Jason Smith.

By nationality, the Devils have drafted 158 Canadians, 94 Americans, 26 Russians, 15 Swedes, 12 Finns, nine Czechs, six Slovaks, three Germans, two Belarusians, one Briton, one Kazakh, one Latvian, one Pole, one Austrian, and one Swiss. The Devils have drafted 12 players from the Oshawa Generals of the Ontario Hockey League (OHL), more than from any other team; the OHL also comprises the greatest number of draftees by league for the Devils, as 70 OHL players have been drafted. 187 forwards, 113 defensemen and 30 goaltenders have been drafted.

The Devils hosted the 2013 NHL entry draft at their home arena, the Prudential Center, in Newark, New Jersey. During the draft the Devils traded their first round selection (ninth overall pick) to the Vancouver Canucks to acquire starting goaltender Cory Schneider.

The team has won the draft lottery four times, moving up in the draft order to select Adam Larsson (fourth overall) in 2011, Nico Hischier (first overall) in 2017, Jack Hughes (first overall) in 2019, and Simon Nemec (second overall) in 2022.

== Key ==
General
Pos	Position
S	Supplemental draft selection

Positions
G	Goaltender	C	Center
D	Defenseman	LW	Left wing
RW	Right wing	F	Forward

Statistics
General
GP	Games played		
Skaters
G	Goals	A	Assists
Pts	Points	PIM	Penalty minutes
Goaltenders
W	Wins	L	Losses
T	Ties	OT	Overtime/shootout losses
GAA	Goals against average		

== Draft picks ==
Statistics are complete as of the 2025–26 NHL season and show each player's career regular season totals in the NHL. Wins, losses, ties, overtime losses and goals against average apply to goaltenders and are used only for players at that position. This list does not include players drafted by the Kansas City Scouts or the Colorado Rockies.

Year	Round	Pick	Player	Nationality	Pos	GP	G	A	Pts	PIM	W	L	T	OT	GAA
1982	1	8	Rocky Trottier	Canada	C	38	6	4	10	2					
1982	1	18	Ken Daneyko	Canada	D	1283	36	142	178	2516					
1982	3	43	Pat Verbeek	Canada	RW	1424	522	541	1063	2905					
1982	3	54	Dave Kasper	Canada	C										
1982	5	85	Scott Brydges	United States	D										
1982	6	106	Mike Moher	Canada	RW	9	0	1	1	28					
1982	7	127	Paul Fulcher	Canada	LW										
1982	8	148	John Hutchings	Canada	D										
1982	9	169	Alan Hepple	Great Britain	D	3	0	0	0	7					
1982	10	190	Brent Shaw	Canada	RW										
1982	11	211	Scott Fusco	United States	C										
1982	12	232	Dan Dorion	United States	RW	4	1	1	2	2					
1983	1	6	John MacLean	Canada	RW	1194	413	429	842	1331					
1983	2	24	Shawn Evans	Canada	D	9	1	0	1	2					
1983	5	85	Chris Terreri	United States	G	406	0	13	13	37	151	172	43	–	3.07
1983	6	105	Gord Mark	Canada	D	85	3	10	13	187					
1983	7	125	Greg Evtushevski	Canada	RW										
1983	8	145	Viacheslav Fetisov	Soviet Union	D	546	36	192	228	656					
1983	9	165	Jay Octeau	United States	D										
1983	10	185	Aleksandr Chernykh	Soviet Union	C										
1983	11	205	Alan Stewart	Canada	LW	64	6	4	10	243					
1983	12	225	Alexei Kasatonov	Soviet Union	D	383	38	122	160	326					
1984	1	2	Kirk Muller	Canada	C	1349	357	602	959	1223					
1984	2	23	Craig Billington	Canada	G	332	0	6	6	42	110	149	31	–	3.63
1984	3	44	Neil Davey	United States	D										
1984	4	74	Paul Ysebaert	Canada	LW	532	149	187	336	217					
1984	5	86	Jon Morris	United States	C	103	16	33	49	47					
1984	6	107	Kirk McLean	Canada	G	612	0	23	23	58	245	261	72	–	3.26
1984	7	128	Ian Ferguson	Canada	D										
1984	8	149	Vladimir Kames	Czechoslovakia	C										
1984	9	170	Mike Roth	United States	D										
1984	10	190	Mike Peluso	United States	D	458	38	52	90	1951					
1984	11	211	Jarkko Piiparinen	Finland	LW										
1984	12	231	Chris Kiene	United States	D										
1985	1	3	Craig Wolanin	United States	D	695	40	133	173	894					
1985	2	24	Sean Burke	Canada	G	820	0	28	28	310	324	341	101	9	2.96
1985	2	32	Eric Weinrich	United States	D	1157	70	318	388	825					
1985	3	45	Myles O'Connor	Canada	D	43	3	4	7	69					
1985	4	66	Greg Polak	United States	LW										
1985	6	108	Bill McMillan	Canada	RW										
1985	7	129	Kevin Schrader	United States	D										
1985	8	150	Ed Krayer	United States	LW										
1985	9	171	Jamie Huscroft	Canada	D	352	5	33	38	1065					
1985	10	192	Terry Shold	United States	LW										
1985	11	213	Jamie McKinley	Canada	RW										
1985	12	234	David Williams	United States	D	173	11	53	64	157					
1986	1	3	Neil Brady	Canada	C	89	9	22	31	95					
1986	2	24	Todd Copeland	United States	D										
1986	3	45	Janne Ojanen	Finland	C	98	21	23	44	28					
1986	3	62	Marc Laniel	Canada	D										
1986	4	66	Anders Carlsson	Sweden	C	104	7	26	33	34					
1986	6	108	Troy Crowder	Canada	RW	150	9	7	16	433					
1986	7	129	Kevin Todd	Canada	C	383	70	133	203	225					
1986	8	150	Ryan Pardoski	Canada	LW										
1986	9	171	Scott McCormack	United States	D										
1986	10	192	Frederic Chabot	Canada	G	32	0	0	0	2	4	8	4	–	2.95
1986	11	213	John Andersen	Canada	C										
1986	12	236	Doug Kirton	Canada	RW										
1986	S1	2	Glen Engevik	Canada	RW										
1986	S2	6	Tim Barakett	United States	RW										
1987	1	2	Brendan Shanahan	Canada	LW	1524	656	698	1354	2489					
1987	2	23	Ricard Persson	Sweden	D	229	10	44	54	262					
1987	4	65	Brian Sullivan	United States	RW	2	0	1	1	0					
1987	5	86	Kevin Dean	United States	D	331	7	48	55	138					
1987	6	107	Ben Hankinson	United States	RW	43	3	3	6	45					
1987	7	128	Tom Neziol	Canada	LW										
1987	8	149	Jim Dowd	United States	C	728	71	168	239	390					
1987	9	170	John Blessman	Canada	D										
1987	10	191	Pete Fry	Canada	G										
1987	11	212	Alain Charland	Canada	C										
1987	S1	2	John Walker	West Germany	LW										
1987	S2	7	Jeff Madill	Canada	RW	14	4	0	4	46					
1988	1	12	Corey Foster	Canada	D	45	5	6	11	24					
1988	2	23	Jeff Christian	Canada	LW	18	2	2	4	17					
1988	3	54	Zdeno Ciger	Czechoslovakia	LW	352	94	134	228	101					
1988	4	65	Matt Ruchty	Canada	LW										
1988	4	75	Scott Luik	Canada	RW										
1988	5	96	Chris Nelson	United States	D										
1988	6	117	Chad Johnson	United States	C										
1988	7	138	Chad Erickson	United States	G	2	0	0	0	0	1	1	0	–	4.50
1988	8	159	Bryan LaFort	United States	G										
1988	9	180	Sergei Svetlov	Soviet Union	RW										
1988	10	201	Bob Woods	Canada	D										
1988	10	207	Alexander Semak	Soviet Union	C	289	83	91	174	187					
1988	11	222	Chuck Hughes	United States	G										
1988	12	243	Michael Pohl	West Germany	C										
1988	S3	17	Tim Budy	United States	LW										
1989	1	5	Bill Guerin	United States	RW	1185	408	403	811	1585					
1989	1	18	Jason Miller	Canada	C	6	0	0	0	0					
1989	2	26	Jarrod Skalde	Canada	C	115	13	21	34	62					
1989	3	47	Scott Pellerin	Canada	LW	536	72	126	198	320					
1989	5	89	Mike Heinke	United States	G										
1989	6	110	David Emma	United States	RW	34	5	6	11	2					
1989	8	152	Sergei Starikov	Soviet Union	D	16	0	1	1	8					
1989	9	173	Andre Faust	Canada	LW	47	10	7	17	14					
1989	11	215	Jason Simon	Canada	LW	5	0	0	0	34					
1989	12	236	Peter Larsson	Sweden	C										
1989	S1	5	C. J. Young	United States	RW	43	7	7	14	32					
1989	S2	10	Mark Romaine	United States	G										
1990	1	20	Martin Brodeur	Canada	G	1266	2	45	47	122	691	397	105	49	2.24
1990	2	24	David Harlock	Canada	D	212	2	14	16	188					
1990	2	29	Chris Gotziaman	United States	RW										
1990	3	53	Mike Dunham	United States	G	394	0	5	5	16	141	178	39	5	2.74
1990	3	56	Brad Bombardir	Canada	D	356	8	46	54	127					
1990	4	64	Mike Bodnarchuk	Canada	RW										
1990	5	95	Dean Malkoc	Canada	D	116	1	3	4	299					
1990	5	104	Petr Kuchyna	Czechoslovakia	D										
1990	6	116	Lubomir Kolnik	Czechoslovakia	RW										
1990	7	137	Chris McAlpine	United States	D	289	6	24	30	245					
1990	9	179	Jaroslav Modry	Czechoslovakia	D	725	49	201	250	510					
1990	10	200	Corey Schwab	Canada	G	147	0	6	6	53	42	63	13	–	2.89
1990	11	221	Valeri Zelepukin	Soviet Union	LW	595	117	177	294	527					
1990	12	242	Todd Reirden	United States	D	183	11	35	46	181					
1990	S2	16	Mike Haviland	United States	RW										
1991	1	3	Scott Niedermayer	Canada	D	1263	172	568	740	784					
1991	1	11	Brian Rolston	United States	LW	1256	342	419	761	472					
1991	2	33	Donevan Hextall	Canada	C										
1991	3	55	Fredrik Bremberg	Sweden	RW	8	0	0	0	2					
1991	4	77	Brad Willner	United States	D										
1991	6	121	Curtis Regnier	Canada	LW										
1991	7	143	Dave Craievich	Canada	D										
1991	8	165	Paul Wolanski	Canada	D										
1991	9	187	Dan Reimann	United States	D										
1991	11	231	Kevin Riehl	Canada	C										
1991	12	253	Jason Hehr	Canada	D										
1991	S2	17	Rob Kruhlak	United States	G										
1992	1	18	Jason Smith	Canada	D	1008	41	128	169	1099					
1992	2	42	Sergei Brylin	Russia	C	765	129	179	308	273					
1992	3	66	Cale Hulse	Canada	D	619	16	79	95	1000					
1992	4	90	Vitaly Tomilin	Russia	C										
1992	4	94	Scott McCabe	United States	D										
1992	5	114	Ryan Black	Canada	LW										
1992	6	138	Dan Trebil	United States	D	85	4	4	8	32					
1992	7	162	Geordie Kinnear	Canada	D	4	0	0	0	13					
1992	8	186	Stephane Yelle	Canada	C	991	96	169	265	490					
1992	9	210	Jeff Toms	Canada	LW	236	22	33	55	59					
1992	10	234	Heath Weenk	Canada	D										
1992	11	258	Vladislav Yakovenko	Russia	LW										
1993	1	13	Denis Pederson	Canada	C	435	57	71	128	398					
1993	2	32	Jay Pandolfo	United States	LW	899	100	126	226	164					
1993	2	39	Brendan Morrison	Canada	C	934	200	401	601	452					
1993	3	65	Krzysztof Oliwa	Poland	LW	410	17	28	45	1447					
1993	5	110	John Guirestante	Canada	RW										
1993	6	143	Steve Brule	Canada	RW	2	0	0	0	0					
1993	7	169	Nikolai Zavarukhin	Russia	C										
1993	8	195	Thom Cullen	Canada	D										
1993	9	221	Judd Lambert	Canada	G										
1993	10	247	Jimmy Provencher	Canada	RW										
1993	11	273	Mike Legg	Canada	RW										
1994	1	25	Vadim Sharifijanov	Russia	LW	92	16	21	37	50					
1994	2	51	Patrik Elias	Czech Republic	LW	1240	408	617	1025	549					
1994	3	71	Sheldon Souray	Canada	D	758	109	191	300	1145					
1994	4	103	Zdenek Skorepa	Czech Republic	LW										
1994	5	129	Christian Gosselin	Canada	D										
1994	6	134	Ryan Smart	United States	C										
1994	6	155	Luciano Caravaggio	Canada	G										
1994	7	181	Jeff Williams	Canada	LW										
1994	8	207	Eric Bertrand	Canada	LW	15	0	0	0	4					
1994	9	233	Steve Sullivan	Canada	C	1011	290	457	747	587					
1994	10	259	Scott Swanjord	United States	G										
1994	11	269	Mike Hanson	United States	C										
1995	1	18	Petr Sykora	Czech Republic	C	1017	323	398	721	455					
1995	2	44	Nathan Perrott	Canada	RW	89	4	5	9	251					
1995	3	70	Sergei Vyshedkevich	Russia	D	30	2	5	7	16					
1995	3	78	David Gosselin	Canada	LW	13	2	1	3	11					
1995	4	79	Alyn McCauley	Canada	C	488	69	97	166	116					
1995	4	96	Henrik Rehnberg	Sweden	D										
1995	5	122	Chris Mason	Canada	G	317	1	3	4	12	137	113	1	31	2.66
1995	6	148	Adam Young	Canada	LW										
1995	7	174	Richard Rochefort	Canada	C										
1995	8	200	Frederic Henry	Canada	G										
1995	9	226	Colin O'Hara	Canada	D										
1996	1	10	Lance Ward	Canada	D	209	4	12	16	391					
1996	2	38	Wes Mason	Canada	LW										
1996	2	41	Josh DeWolf	United States	D										
1996	2	47	Pierre Dagenais	Canada	LW	284	70	46	116	116					
1996	2	49	Colin White	Canada	D	797	21	108	129	869					
1996	3	63	Scott Parker	Canada	RW	308	7	14	21	699					
1996	4	91	Josef Boumedienne	Sweden	D	47	4	12	16	36					
1996	4	101	Josh MacNevin	Canada	D										
1996	5	118	Glenn Crawford	Canada	LW										
1996	6	145	Sean Ritchlin	United States	RW										
1996	7	173	Daryl Andrews	Canada	D										
1996	8	199	Willie Mitchell	Canada	D	907	34	146	180	787					
1996	8	205	Jay Bertsch	Canada	RW										
1996	9	225	Pasi Petrilainen	Finland	D										
1997	1	24	Jean-Francois Damphousse	Canada	G	6	0	0	0	0	1	3	0	–	2.45
1997	2	38	Stanislav Gron	Slovakia	LW	1	0	0	0	0					
1997	4	104	Lucas Nehrling	Canada	D										
1997	5	131	Jiri Bicek	Slovakia	LW	62	6	7	13	29					
1997	6	159	Sascha Goc	Germany	D	22	0	0	0	4					
1997	7	188	Mathieu Benoit	Canada	RW										
1997	8	215	Scott Clemmensen	United States	G	191	0	2	2	4	73	59	0	24	2.79
1997	9	241	Jan Srdinko	Czech Republic	D										
1998	1	26	Mike Van Ryn	Canada	D	353	30	99	129	260					
1998	1	27	Scott Gomez	United States	C	1079	181	575	756	655					
1998	2	37	Christian Berglund	Sweden	C	86	11	16	27	42					
1998	3	82	Brian Gionta	United States	RW	1026	291	304	595	377					
1998	4	96	Mikko Jokela	Finland	D	1	0	0	0	0					
1998	4	105	Pierre Dagenais	Canada	LW	142	35	23	58	58					
1998	5	119	Anton But	Russia	LW										
1998	5	143	Ryan Flinn	Canada	LW	31	1	0	1	84					
1998	6	172	Jacques Lariviere	Canada	LW										
1998	7	199	Erik Jensen	United States	RW										
1998	8	227	Marko Ahosilta	Finland	C										
1998	9	257	Ryan Held	Canada	C										
1999	1	27	Ari Ahonen	Finland	G										
1999	2	42	Mike Commodore	Canada	D	484	23	83	106	683					
1999	2	50	Brett Clouthier	Canada	LW										
1999	3	95	Andre Lakos	Austria	D										
1999	4	100	Teemu Kesa	Finland	D										
1999	6	185	Scott Cameron	Canada	LW										
1999	7	214	Chris Hartsburg	United States	C										
1999	8	242	Justin Dziama	United States	RW										
2000	1	22	David Hale	United States	D	327	4	25	29	242					
2000	2	39	Teemu Laine	Finland	RW										
2000	2	56	Alexander Suglobov	Russia	RW	18	1	0	1	4					
2000	2	57	Matt DeMarchi	United States	D										
2000	2	62	Paul Martin	United States	D	870	50	270	320	238					
2000	3	67	Max Birbraer	Kazakhstan	LW										
2000	3	76	Mike Rupp	United States	LW	609	54	45	99	855					
2000	4	125	Phil Cole	Canada	D										
2000	5	135	Mike Danton	Canada	C	87	9	5	14	182					
2000	5	164	Matus Kostur	Slovakia	G										
2000	6	194	Deryk Engelland	Canada	D	671	30	97	127	579					
2000	7	198	Ken Magowan	Canada	LW										
2000	8	257	Warren McCutcheon	Canada	C										
2001	1	28	Adrian Foster	Canada	C										
2001	2	44	Igor Pohanka	Slovakia	C										
2001	2	48	Tuomas Pihlman	Finland	LW	15	1	1	2	12					
2001	2	60	Victor Uchevatov	Russia	D										
2001	3	67	Robin Leblanc	Canada	RW										
2001	3	72	Brandon Nolan	Canada	C	6	0	1	1	0					
2001	4	128	Andrei Posnov	Russia	LW										
2001	5	163	Andreas Salomonsson	Sweden	LW	71	5	9	14	36					
2001	6	194	James Massen	United States	RW										
2001	8	229	Aaron Voros	Canada	RW	162	18	19	37	395					
2001	8	257	Evgeny Gamalei	Russia	RW										
2002	2	51	Anton Kadeykin	Russia	D										
2002	2	53	Barry Tallackson	United States	RW	20	1	1	2	2					
2002	3	64	Jason Ryznar	United States	LW	8	0	0	0	2					
2002	3	84	Marek Chvatal	Czech Republic	D										
2002	3	85	Ahren Nittel	Canada	LW										
2002	4	117	Cam Janssen	United States	RW	336	6	8	14	774					
2002	5	154	Krisjanis Redlihs	Latvia	D										
2002	6	187	Eric Johansson	Canada	C										
2002	7	218	Ilkka Pikkarainen	Finland	RW	31	1	3	4	10					
2002	8	250	Dan Glover	Canada	D										
2002	9	281	Bill Kinkel	United States	LW										
2003	1	17	Zach Parise	United States	C	1254	434	455	889	444					
2003	2	42	Petr Vrana	Czech Republic	C	16	1	0	1	2					
2003	3	93	Ivan Khomutov	Russia	C										
2003	5	167	Zach Tarkir	United States	D										
2003	6	197	Jason Smith	Canada	G										
2003	8	261	Joey Tenute	Canada	C	1	0	0	0	0					
2003	9	292	Arseny Bondarev	Russia	LW										
2004	1	20	Travis Zajac	Canada	C	1037	203	349	552	344					
2004	5	155	Alexander Mikhailishin	Russia	D										
2004	6	185	Josh Disher	Canada	G										
2004	7	216	Pierre-Luc Letourneau-Leblond	Canada	RW	41	0	3	3	101					
2004	7	217	Tyler Eckford	Canada	D	7	0	1	1	4					
2004	8	250	Nathan Perkovich	United States	RW										
2004	9	282	Valeri Klimov	Russia	D										
2005	1	23	Niclas Bergfors	Sweden	RW	173	35	48	83	20					
2005	2	38	Jeff Frazee	United States	G	1	0	0	0	0	0	0	–	0	0.00
2005	3	84	Mark Fraser	Canada	D	219	4	18	22	302					
2005	4	99	Patrick Davis	United States	LW	9	1	0	1	0					
2005	5	155	Mark Fayne	United States	D	389	17	48	65	131					
2005	6	170	Sean Zimmerman	United States	D										
2005	7	218	Alexander Sundstrom	Sweden	C										
2006	1	30	Matt Corrente	Canada	D	34	0	6	6	68					
2006	2	58	Alexander Vasyunov	Russia	LW	18	1	4	5	0					
2006	3	67	Kirill Tulupov	Russia											
2006	3	77	Vladimir Zharkov	Russia	RW	82	2	12	14	10					
2006	4	107	T. J. Miller	United States	D										
2006	5	148	Olivier Magnan	Canada	D	18	0	0	0	4					
2006	6	178	Tony Romano	United States	C										
2006	7	208	Kyell Henegan	Canada	RW										
2007	2	57	Mike Hoeffel	United States	LW										
2007	3	79	Nick Palmieri	United States	RW	87	13	12	25	20					
2007	3	87	Corbin McPherson	United States	D										
2007	4	117	Matthew Halischuk	Canada	RW	280	33	42	75	57					
2007	6	177	Vili Sopanen	Finland	RW										
2007	7	207	Ryan Molle	Canada	D										
2008	1	24	Mattias Tedenby	Sweden	LW	120	10	20	30	42					
2008	2	52	Brandon Burlon	Canada	D										
2008	2	54	Patrice Cormier	Canada	C	52	1	4	5	18					
2008	3	82	Adam Henrique	Canada	C	1058	278	294	572	322					
2008	4	112	Matt Delahey	Canada	D										
2008	5	142	Kory Nagy	Canada	C										
2008	6	172	David Wohlberg	United States	C										
2008	7	202	Harry Young	Canada	D										
2008	7	205	Jean-Sebastien Berube	Canada	LW										
2009	1	20	Jacob Josefson	Sweden	C	315	20	44	64	84					
2009	2	54	Eric Gelinas	Canada	D	189	14	41	55	92					
2009	3	73	Alexander Urbom	Sweden	D	34	3	1	4	28					
2009	4	114	Seth Helgeson	United States	D	50	1	3	4	50					
2009	5	144	Derek Rodwell	Canada	LW										
2009	6	174	Ashton Bernard	Canada	LW										
2009	7	204	Curtis Gedig	Canada	D										
2010	2	38	Jon Merrill	United States	D	682	24	91	115	321					
2010	3	84	Scott Wedgewood	Canada	G	199	0	1	1	4	93	60	–	30	2.68
2010	4	114	Joe Faust	United States	D										
2010	6	174	Maxime Clermont	Canada	G										
2010	7	204	Mauro Jorg	Switzerland	D										
2011	1	4	Adam Larsson	Sweden	D	1012	59	207	266	577					
2011	3	75	Blake Coleman	United States	C	693	170	155	325	516					
2011	4	99	Reid Boucher	United States	C	133	20	22	42	18					
2011	5	129	Blake Pietila	United States	LW	38	1	3	4	12					
2011	6	159	Reece Scarlett	Canada	D										
2011	7	189	Patrick Daly	United States	D										
2012	1	29	Stefan Matteau	United States	C	92	6	5	11	41					
2012	2	60	Damon Severson	Canada	D	855	81	267	348	531					
2012	3	90	Ben Johnson	United States	LW										
2012	4	96	Ben Thomson	Canada	LW	3	0	0	0	4					
2012	5	135	Graham Black	Canada	C										
2012	5	150	Alexander Kerfoot	Canada	C	639	105	200	305	223					
2012	6	180	Artur Gavrus	Belarus	LW										
2013	2	42	Steven Santini	United States	D	136	5	19	24	59					
2013	3	73	Ryan Kujawinski	Canada	C										
2013	4	100	Miles Wood	United States	LW	567	99	97	196	576					
2013	6	160	Myles Bell	Canada	LW										
2013	7	208	Anthony Brodeur	United States	G										
2014	1	30	John Quenneville	Canada	C	42	2	3	5	6					
2014	2	42	Josh Jacobs	United States	D	3	0	0	0	2					
2014	3	71	Connor Chatham	Canada	RW										
2014	5	131	Ryan Rehill	Canada	D										
2014	6	152	Joey Dudek	United States	C										
2014	6	161	Brandon Baddock	Canada	LW	1	0	0	0	0					
2015	1	6	Pavel Zacha	Czech Republic	C	706	155	252	407	193					
2015	2	42	Mackenzie Blackwood	Canada	G	291	0	2	2	6	126	113	–	30	2.90
2015	3	67	Blake Speers	Canada	C	5	0	0	0	2					
2015	4	97	Colton White	Canada	D	107	0	14	14	24					
2015	6	157	Brett Seney	Canada	LW	66	6	8	14	39					
2016	1	12	Michael McLeod	Canada	C	287	29	56	85	164					
2016	2	41	Nathan Bastian	Canada	RW	312	39	36	75	211					
2016	3	73	Joey Anderson	United States	RW	169	19	21	40	18					
2016	3	80	Brandon Gignac	Canada	C	8	1	0	1	0					
2016	4	102	Mikhail Maltsev	Russia	LW	56	6	3	9	6					
2016	4	105	Evan Cormier	Canada	G										
2016	5	132	Yegor Rykov	Russia	D										
2016	6	162	Jesper Bratt	Sweden	LW	634	172	346	518	102					
2016	7	192	Jeremy Davies	Canada	D	23	0	3	3	12					
2017	1	1	Nico Hischier	Switzerland	C	609	199	289	488	154					
2017	2	36	Jesper Boqvist	Sweden	C	387	50	55	105	60					
2017	3	63	Fabian Zetterlund	Sweden	C	329	69	80	149	77					
2017	3	81	Reilly Walsh	United States	D	1	0	1	1	0					
2017	4	98	Nikita Popugayev	Russia	RW										
2017	5	129	Gilles Senn	Switzerland	G	2	0	0	0	0	0	1	–	0	3.43
2017	5	143	Marian Studenic	Slovakia	RW	46	3	3	6	12					
2017	6	160	Aarne Talvitie	Finland	C										
2017	7	191	Jocktan Chainey	Canada	D										
2017	7	205	Yegor Zaitsev	Russia	D										
2017	7	214	Matt Hellickson	United States	D										
2018	1	17	Ty Smith	Canada	D	131	9	40	49	52					
2018	4	110	Xavier Bernard	Canada	D										
2018	5	136	Akira Schmid	Switzerland	G	82	0	3	3	2	32	28	–	10	2.66
2018	5	141	Yegor Sharangovich	Belarus	C	438	116	110	226	71					
2018	6	172	Mitchell Hoelscher	Canada	C										
2018	7	203	Eetu Pakkila	Finland	LW										
2019	1	1	Jack Hughes	United States	C	429	168	260	428	72					
2019	2	61	Nikita Okhotiuk	Russia	D	67	3	9	12	52					
2019	3	70	Daniil Misyul	Russia	D	1	0	0	0	0					
2019	3	80	Graeme Clarke	Canada	RW	3	0	0	0	2					
2019	3	82	Michael Vukojevic	Canada	D										
2019	4	96	Tyce Thompson	Canada	RW	11	0	1	1	0					
2019	4	118	Case Mccarthy	United States	D										
2019	5	127	Cole Brady	Canada	G										
2019	5	129	Arseny Gritsyuk	Russia	RW	66	13	18	31	26					
2019	6	158	Patrick Moynihan	United States	RW										
2019	7	189	Nikola Pasic	Sweden	RW										
2020	1	7	Alexander Holtz	Sweden	RW	191	26	29	55	44					
2020	1	18	Dawson Mercer	Canada	C	410	103	106	209	120					
2020	1	20	Shakir Mukhamadullin	Russia	D	83	7	15	22	34					
2020	3	84	Nico Daws	Canada	G	55	0	1	1	0	24	24	–	1	2.96
2020	4	99	Jaromir Pytlik	Czech Republic	C										
2020	4	120	Ethan Edwards	Canada	D										
2020	5	130	Artem Shlaine	United States	C										
2020	6	161	Benjamin Baumgartner	Austria	F										
2021	1	4	Luke Hughes	United States	D	223	23	105	128	76					
2021	1	29	Chase Stillman	Canada	RW										
2021	3	68	Samu Salminen	Finland	C										
2021	4	100	Jakub Malek	Czech Republic	G										
2021	5	129	Topias Vilen	Finland	D	2	0	0	0	0					
2021	6	164	Viktor Hurtig	Sweden	D										
2021	7	203	Zakhar Bardakov	Russia	RW	60	1	9	10	14					
2022	1	2	Simon Nemec	Slovakia	D	155	16	33	49	73					
2022	2	46	Seamus Casey	United States	D	16	4	4	8	0					
2022	4	102	Tyler Brennan	Canada	G										
2022	4	110	Daniil Orlov	Russia	D										
2022	4	126	Charlie Leddy	United States	D										
2022	5	141	Petr Hauser	Czech Republic	RW										
2022	6	166	Josh Filmon	Canada	LW										
2022	7	198	Artyom Barabosha	Russia	D										
2023	2	58	Lenni Hameenaho	Finland	RW	33	2	6	8	14					
2023	4	122	Cam Squires	Canada	RW										
2023	5	154	Chase Cheslock	United States	D										
2023	6	164	Cole Brown	Canada	RW										
2023	6	186	Daniil Karpovich	Belarus	D										
2024	1	10	Anton Silayev	Russia	D										
2024	2	49	Mikhail Yegorov	Russia	G										
2024	3	85	Kasper Pikkarainen	Finland	RW										
2024	3	91	Herman Traff	Sweden	RW										
2024	5	139	Max Graham	Canada	C										
2024	5	146	Veeti Louhivaara	Finland	G										
2024	6	171	Matyas Melovsky	Czech Republic	C										
2025	2	50	Conrad Fondrk	United States	C										
2025	2	63	Benjamin Kevan	United States	RW										
2025	3	90	Mason Moe	United States	C										
2025	4	99	Trenten Bennett	Canada	G										
2025	4	114	Gustav Hillstrom	Sweden	C										
2025	6	161	David Rozsival	Czech Republic	RW										
2025	6	178	Sigge Holmgren	Sweden	D										
2026	1	12	Alexander Command	Sweden	C										
2026	2	37	Matias Vanhanen	Finland	LW										
2026	2	44	Nikita Shcherbakov	Russia	D										
2026	4	119	Lavr Gashilov	Russia	C										
2026	5	149	Daniil Rusakovich	Belarus	G										
2026	6	172	Luke Wilfley	United States	C										
2026	7	222	Quinn McKenzie	United States	C										

== See also ==
- List of Kansas City Scouts draft picks
- List of Colorado Rockies (NHL) draft picks
- List of first overall NHL draft picks
- List of undrafted NHL players with 100 games played
