= Richard Zedník =

Slovak ice hockey player (born 1976)

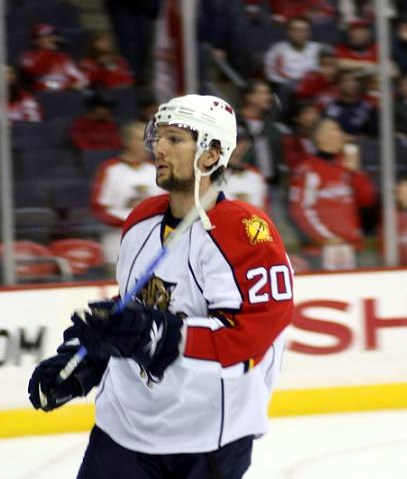
- Born: 6 January 1976 (age 50) Banská Bystrica, Czechoslovakia
- Height: 6 ft 1 in (185 cm)
- Weight: 196 lb (89 kg; 14 st 0 lb)
- Position: Right wing
- Shot: Left
- Played for: Washington Capitals; Montreal Canadiens; HKM Zvolen; New York Islanders; Florida Panthers; Lokomotiv Yaroslavl; HC '05 Banská Bystrica; AIK
- National team: Slovakia
- NHL draft: 249th overall, 1994; Washington Capitals
- Playing career: 1996–2011

Richard Zedník (born 6 January 1976) is a Slovak former professional ice hockey winger. He had a 15-year career in the National Hockey League (NHL), playing for the Washington Capitals, Montreal Canadiens, New York Islanders and Florida Panthers.

In February 2008, Zedník sustained a life-threatening injury during an NHL game when the skate of his teammate Olli Jokinen accidentally sliced his common carotid artery.

== Playing career ==
Zedník was drafted in the 1994 NHL entry draft by the Washington Capitals, in the tenth round, 249th overall, after playing junior hockey for the Portland Winter Hawks of the Western Hockey League (WHL).

Zedník scored 35 goals in his rookie year with the Winter Hawks during the 1994–95 season. In his second year with the major junior team, he scored 44 goals which earned him Second Team All-Star honours. Zedník made his professional debut at the end of the 1995–96 season, playing in a single game with the Capitals before joining their minor league affiliate, the Portland Pirates of the American Hockey League (AHL), for their Calder Cup finals playoff run. Zedník made the Capitals' roster out of training camp in 1996 and scored his first career NHL goal in the season opener on October 5 against Ed Belfour of the Chicago Blackhawks. After one goal in nine games, Zedník was sent down to Portland before being recalled briefly in March 1997.

Zedník played his first full NHL season in 1997–98, playing in 65 games with the Capitals and recording 17 goals. Zedník scored the first Capitals goal in Capital One Arena (then MCI Center) history.

On October 31, 2000, a local Washington, D.C., radio station, DC101, had a promotion in which they offered fans a free ticket and Zedník jersey if they dyed their hair blond as Zedník had in the off-season. Two hundred fans with dyed hair attended the game, at which Zedník scored his first career hat-trick against the Detroit Red Wings, who had not lost in Washington in ten years.

After spending six seasons with the Capitals, Zedník was traded during the 2000–01 season, along with Jan Bulis and a first-round draft pick (used to select Alexander Perezhogin), to the Montreal Canadiens in exchange for Trevor Linden, Dainius Zubrus and a second-round draft pick (later traded to the Tampa Bay Lightning) on March 13, 2001.

On April 26, 2002, during a playoff game in Montreal against the Boston Bruins, Zedník was elbowed in the face by Bruins defenceman Kyle McLaren. Zedník suffered a fractured cheekbone, broken nose and a concussion. Despite the Canadiens losing the game 5–2 and Zedník for the remainder of the playoffs, they would win the series 4–2.

After playing the next three years in Montreal, Zedník was traded back to the Capitals on July 12, 2006, in exchange for a third-round draft pick. Zedník's second stint back with the Capitals was short as he was dealt at the trade deadline to the New York Islanders for a second-round draft pick on February 26, 2007.

At the conclusion of the 2006–07 season, Zedník, a free agent, signed a two-year contract with the Florida Panthers on July 1, 2007.

On April 30, 2009, Zedník was announced as a Masterton Trophy finalist for the 2008–09 season. His nomination coincided with an official announcement that Zedník signed a two-year contract to play for Lokomotiv Yaroslavl in the Kontinental Hockey League (KHL) from the 2009–10 season. Following his first season at the club, where he scored 9 goals and recorded 17 assists across 54 games, the club terminated his contract in July 2010.

Zedník then played two games with HC 05 Banská Bystrica of the Slovak Extraliga. On January 10, 2011, he signed a contract with AIK IF, which expired after the 2010–11 Elitserien season.

=== Neck injury ===
On February 10, 2008, in a game where the Florida Panthers were playing the Buffalo Sabres, Zedník suffered a severe and life-threatening injury. Teammate Olli Jokinen was tangled up with Sabre Clarke MacArthur and lost his balance in front of Zedník. Zedník was skating past as Jokinen fell, and his skate blade accidentally made contact with Zedník's neck, slicing his common carotid artery open and causing it to expel a trail of blood onto the ice. Zedník reacted quickly and skated to the Panthers' bench. He was immediately attended to by Florida trainer Dave Zenobi, who took him to the locker room for treatment. Paramedics, who are on standby at every NHL game, stabilized Zedník while the home team doctor Les Bisson controlled the bleeding. Bisson noted that Zedník appeared to be in shock but was not near death, as he was alert and responsive. Zedník lost five pints of blood (2.3 L). He was transported to hospital on emergency run, his status being published as stable after leaving the arena. The game was delayed for more than 20 minutes as the Zamboni was needed to help remove the blood from the ice. The announcement over the public address speakers at HSBC Arena that Zedník was in stable condition and en route to a Buffalo, New York, hospital sparked a prolonged standing ovation from the Buffalo fans as the game went on as planned.

Emergency surgery was performed at Buffalo General Hospital to repair the artery. The artery was not totally severed; had it been, it would have recessed into the neck, requiring more extensive surgery to repair. Zedník was in the intensive care unit through February 12, then released from hospital on February 16, but missed the rest of the season recovering from the injury. He returned to play in the 2008–09 season.

Zedník's injury drew comparisons with a similar injury suffered in 1989 by Clint Malarchuk, who was a goalkeeper for the Buffalo Sabres. Both injuries prompted discussion about neck guards and player safety in the NHL. At present, team doctors (practitioners of sports medicine) are trained in trauma care and are required to be seated behind the home team bench at every game.

== Personal life ==
Zedník married French-Canadian actress Jessica Welch in 2005. They divorced in 2009 and have one daughter.

== Career statistics ==
=== Regular season and playoffs ===
			Regular season					Playoffs
Season	Team	League	GP	G	A	Pts	PIM	GP	G	A	Pts	PIM
1992–93	Iskra Smrečina Banská Bystrica	SVK-2	—	—	—	—	—	—	—	—	—	—
1993–94	ŠK Iskra Banská Bystrica	SVK-2	25	3	6	9	—	—	—	—	—	—
1994–95	Portland Winter Hawks	WHL	65	35	51	86	89	9	5	5	10	20
1995–96	Portland Winter Hawks	WHL	61	44	37	81	154	7	8	4	12	23
1995–96	Portland Pirates	AHL	1	1	1	2	0	21	4	5	9	26
1995–96	Washington Capitals	NHL	1	0	0	0	0	—	—	—	—	—
1996–97	Portland Pirates	AHL	56	15	20	35	70	5	1	0	1	6
1996–97	Washington Capitals	NHL	11	2	1	3	4	—	—	—	—	—
1997–98	Washington Capitals	NHL	65	17	9	26	28	17	7	3	10	16
1998–99	Washington Capitals	NHL	49	9	8	17	50	—	—	—	—	—
1999–00	ŠaHK Iskra Banská Bystrica	SVK-2	1	0	0	0	0	—	—	—	—	—
1999–00	Washington Capitals	NHL	69	19	16	35	54	5	0	0	0	0
2000–01	Washington Capitals	NHL	62	16	19	35	61	—	—	—	—	—
2000–01	Montreal Canadiens	NHL	12	3	6	9	10	—	—	—	—	—
2001–02	Montreal Canadiens	NHL	82	22	22	44	59	4	4	4	8	6
2002–03	Montreal Canadiens	NHL	80	31	19	50	79	—	—	—	—	—
2003–04	Montreal Canadiens	NHL	81	26	24	50	63	11	3	3	6	2
2004–05	HKM Zvolen	SVK	36	15	19	34	56	17	9	10	19	12
2005–06	Montreal Canadiens	NHL	67	16	14	30	48	6	2	0	2	4
2006–07	Washington Capitals	NHL	32	6	12	18	16	—	—	—	—	—
2006–07	New York Islanders	NHL	10	1	2	3	2	5	0	0	0	8
2007–08	Florida Panthers	NHL	54	15	11	26	43	—	—	—	—	—
2008–09	Florida Panthers	NHL	70	17	16	33	46	—	—	—	—	—
2009–10	Lokomotiv Yaroslavl	KHL	37	6	12	18	56	17	3	5	8	22
2010–11	HC '05 Banská Bystrica	SVK	2	0	0	0	0	—	—	—	—	—
2010–11	AIK	SEL	18	2	3	5	12	3	1	1	2	0
NHL totals			745	200	179	379	563	48	16	10	26	41

=== International ===
Year	Team	Event	GP	G	A	Pts	PIM
1993	Slovakia	EJC C	4	8	2	10	6
1994	Slovakia	EJC C	6	8	12	20	10
1996	Slovakia	WJC	6	5	2	7	10
1996	Slovakia	WCH	3	0	0	0	0
2001	Slovakia	WC	7	2	2	4	14
2003	Slovakia	WC	9	5	3	8	6
2004	Slovakia	WCH	3	0	0	0	0
2005	Slovakia	WC	7	1	1	2	10
2006	Slovakia	OG	6	1	0	1	12
2010	Slovakia	OG	7	2	4	6	6
2011	Slovakia	WC	6	1	1	2	2
Senior totals			48	12	11	23	50

== International play ==
Played for Slovakia in:

- 2006, 2010 Winter Olympic Games
- World Championships – 2001, 2003 (bronze medal), 2005, 2011
- World Cup of Hockey – 1996, 2004
- Team Slovakia – 45 caps / 10 goals
- Ball Hockey World Championships – 1999 (gold medal)

== Awards ==
- WHL West Second All-Star Team – 1996

== See also ==
- List of Slovaks in the NHL
