= Josef Marha =

Czech ice hockey player

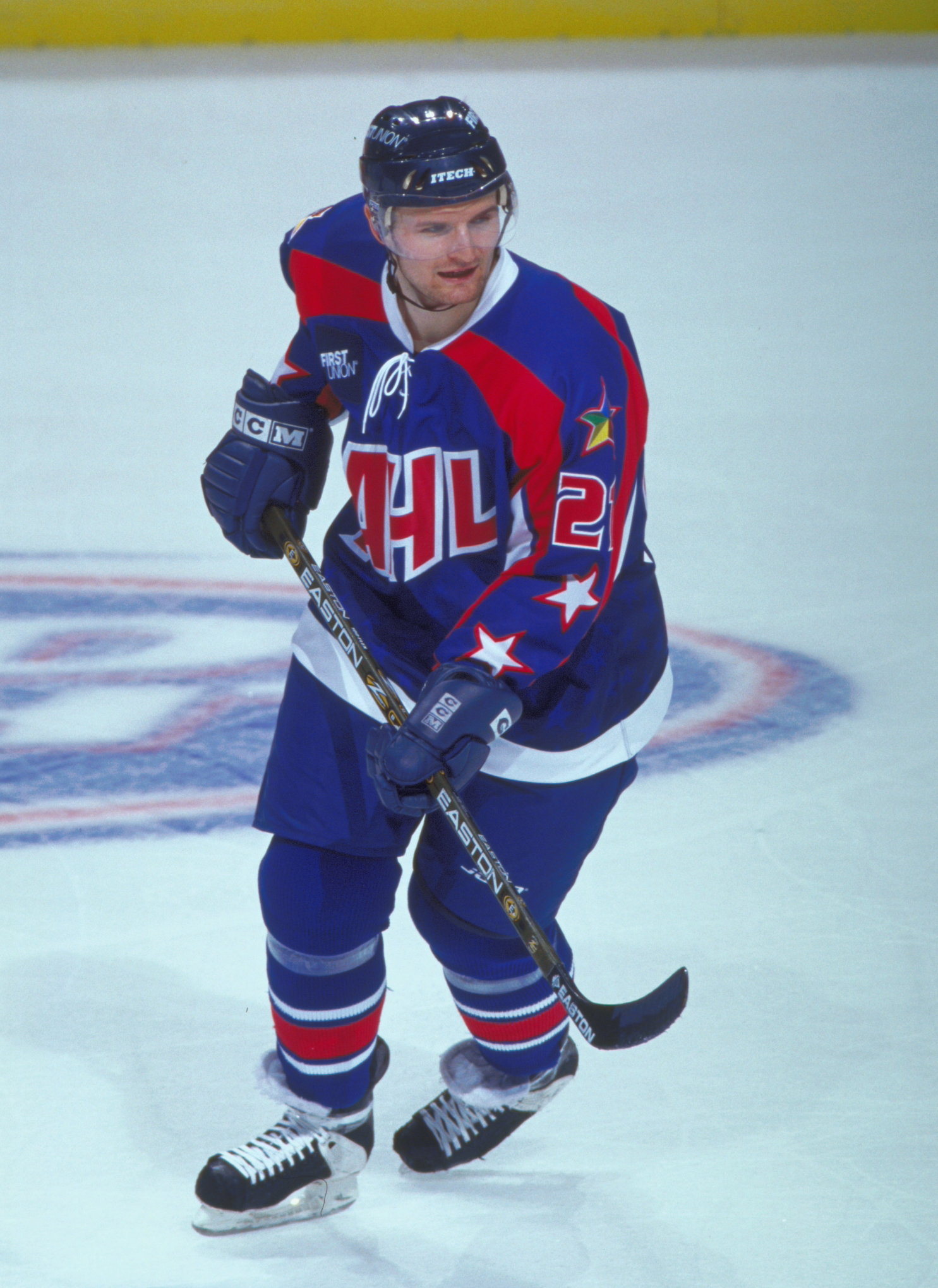
- Born: 2 June 1976 (age 49) Havlíčkův Brod, Czechoslovakia
- Height: 6 ft 0 in (183 cm)
- Weight: 176 lb (80 kg; 12 st 8 lb)
- Position: Centre
- Shot: Left
- Played for: HC Dukla Jihlava; Colorado Avalanche; Mighty Ducks of Anaheim; Chicago Blackhawks; HC Davos; HC Pardubice; HK Hradec Kralove
- National team: Czech Republic
- NHL draft: 35th overall, 1994; Quebec Nordiques
- Playing career: 1992–2014

Josef Marha (born 2 June 1976) is a Czech former professional ice hockey player.

== Playing career ==
Marha played in the National Hockey League for the Colorado Avalanche, Mighty Ducks of Anaheim and the Chicago Blackhawks, playing 159 regular season games with 21 goals and 32 assists for 53 points, picking up 32 penalty minutes. On the Chicago Blackhawks, he was commonly referred to at the 'Captain of the 4th Line'. He was drafted 35th overall by the Quebec Nordiques in the 1994 NHL entry draft.

Marha left the NHL to join HC Davos of the Swiss National League A (NLA) in 2001. He spent the next 12 years of his professional career, capturing 5 league titles with Davos, before announcing his retirement at the conclusion of the clubs involvement in the 2012–13 season on March 17, 2013.

In his return to his native Czech Republic, Marha announced the continuation of his playing career by agreeing to a multi-year deal with HC Pardubice of the Czech Extraliga on April 29, 2013. After only 23 games with Pardubice, Marha opted to terminate his contract with the club, and transfer to fellow Extraliga club, HK Hradec Kralove on November 30, 2013.

== Career statistics ==
=== Regular season and playoffs ===
			Regular season					Playoffs
Season	Team	League	GP	G	A	Pts	PIM	GP	G	A	Pts	PIM
1992–93	HC Dukla Jihlava	CZE	7	2	2	4	0	—	—	—	—	—
1993–94	HC Dukla Jihlava	CZE	41	7	2	9	0	3	0	1	1	0
1994–95	HC Dukla Jihlava	CZE	35	3	7	10	0	—	—	—	—	—
1995–96	Cornwall Aces	AHL	74	18	30	48	30	8	1	2	3	10
1995–96	Colorado Avalanche	NHL	2	0	1	1	0	—	—	—	—	—
1996–97	Hershey Bears	AHL	67	23	49	72	44	19	6	16	22	10
1996–97	Colorado Avalanche	NHL	6	0	1	1	0	—	—	—	—	—
1997–98	Hershey Bears	AHL	55	6	46	52	30	—	—	—	—	—
1997–98	Colorado Avalanche	NHL	11	2	5	7	4	—	—	—	—	—
1997–98	Mighty Ducks of Anaheim	NHL	12	7	4	11	0	—	—	—	—	—
1998–99	Mighty Ducks of Anaheim	NHL	10	0	1	1	0	—	—	—	—	—
1998–99	Cincinnati Mighty Ducks	AHL	3	1	0	1	4	—	—	—	—	—
1998–99	Portland Pirates	AHL	8	0	8	8	2	—	—	—	—	—
1998–99	Chicago Blackhawks	NHL	22	2	5	7	4	—	—	—	—	—
1999–00	Chicago Blackhawks	NHL	81	10	12	22	18	—	—	—	—	—
2000–01	Norfolk Admirals	AHL	60	18	28	46	44	9	1	8	9	6
2000–01	Chicago Blackhawks	NHL	15	0	3	3	6	—	—	—	—	—
2001–02	HC Davos	NLA	44	18	14	32	36	16	6	9	15	8
2002–03	HC Davos	NLA	43	14	18	32	51	17	4	6	10	6
2003–04	HC Davos	NLA	41	12	10	22	30	6	2	1	3	0
2004–05	HC Davos	NLA	44	18	22	40	30	15	2	9	11	14
2005–06	HC Davos	NLA	44	9	16	25	44	13	2	3	5	10
2006–07	HC Davos	NLA	41	9	13	22	32	19	8	6	14	26
2007–08	HC Davos	NLA	48	15	8	23	20	13	1	4	5	12
2008–09	HC Davos	NLA	49	11	14	25	44	20	2	8	10	2
2009–10	HC Davos	NLA	48	11	22	33	30	6	1	0	1	2
2010–11	HC Davos	NLA	44	7	15	22	34	9	5	3	7	4
2011–12	HC Davos	NLA	40	9	8	17	16	3	0	0	0	0
2012–13	HC Davos	NLA	45	4	12	16	12	7	1	0	1	8
2013–14	HC Pardubice	CZE	23	2	4	6	8	—	—	—	—	—
2013–14	HK Hradec Kralove	CZE	20	0	3	3	10	4	0	0	0	2
NLA totals			531	137	172	309	379	144	35	49	84	92
NHL totals			159	21	32	53	32	—	—	—	—	—

=== International ===
Year	Team	Event	Result	GP	G	A	Pts	PIM
1994	Czech Republic	EJC18	3rd place, bronze medalist(s)	5	4	5	9	4
1994	Czech Republic	WJC	5th	5	4	0	4	2
1995	Czech Republic	WJC	6th	7	5	5	10	0
Junior totals				17	13	10	23	6

== Awards and honours ==
Award	Year
AHL
Calder Cup (Hershey Bears)	1997
All-Star Game	1998, 2001
