= Byron Briske =

Canadian ice hockey player (born 1976)

- Born: January 23, 1976 (age 50) Humboldt, SK, CAN
- Height: 6 ft 4 in (193 cm)
- Weight: 194 lb (88 kg; 13 st 12 lb)
- Position: Defenceman
- Shot: Right
- Played for: Baltimore Bandits; Cincinnati Mighty Ducks; Quebec Citadelles; Detroit Vipers; Long Beach Ice Dogs
- NHL draft: 80th overall, 1994; Mighty Ducks of Anaheim
- Playing career: 1996–2000

Byron Briske (born January 23, 1976) is a Canadian former professional ice hockey defenceman.

Briske was drafted 80th overall by the Mighty Ducks of Anaheim in the 1994 NHL entry draft, having played junior hockey in the Western Hockey League for the Victoria Cougars and the Red Deer Rebels and later played for the Tri-City Americans. He was signed by the Mighty Ducks in 1996 and spent three seasons playing in the American Hockey League, beginning with the Baltimore Bandits for one season before their relocation to Cincinnati, Ohio in which they became the Cincinnati Mighty Ducks, where he played for two seasons. He signed with the Montreal Canadiens in 1999, but spent the 1999–00 season playing in the AHL for the Quebec Citadelles as well as the International Hockey League for the Detroit Vipers and the Long Beach Ice Dogs. It was with the Vipers that Briske scored the only goal in his professional career. The 1999–00 season would be his last as a professional.

Since retiring, Briske has gone on to become a financial advisor and currently works for Assante Wealth Management.

== Career statistics ==
			Regular season					Playoffs
Season	Team	League	GP	G	A	Pts	PIM	GP	G	A	Pts	PIM
1991–92	Victoria Cougars	WHL	1	0	0	0	0	—	—	—	—	—
1992–93	Victoria Cougars	WHL	66	1	10	11	110	—	—	—	—	—
1993–94	Red Deer Rebels	WHL	61	6	21	27	174	—	—	—	—	—
1994–95	Red Deer Rebels	WHL	48	4	17	21	116	—	—	—	—	—
1994–95	Tri-City Americans	WHL	15	0	1	1	22	13	0	0	0	18
1995–96	Tri-City Americans	WHL	72	15	38	53	189	11	0	5	5	36
1996–97	Baltimore Bandits	AHL	69	0	6	6	131	1	0	0	0	0
1997–98	Cincinnati Mighty Ducks	AHL	59	0	9	9	95	—	—	—	—	—
1998–99	Cincinnati Mighty Ducks	AHL	55	0	6	6	130	3	0	0	0	2
1999–00	Quebec Citadelles	AHL	26	0	3	3	47	—	—	—	—	—
1999–00	Detroit Vipers	IHL	28	1	3	4	56	—	—	—	—	—
1999–00	Long Beach Ice Dogs	IHL	2	0	0	0	9	—	—	—	—	—
AHL totals			209	0	24	24	403	4	0	0	0	2
