= Steve Cheredaryk =

Canadian ice hockey defenceman

- Born: November 20, 1975 (age 50) Calgary, Alberta, Canada
- Height: 6 ft 2 in (188 cm)
- Weight: 215 lb (98 kg; 15 st 5 lb)
- Position: Defence
- Shot: Left
- Played for: AHL; Springfield Falcons; Fredericton Canadiens; Lowell Lock Monsters; Saint John Flames; ECHL; Knoxville Cherokees; Mississippi Sea Wolves; New Orleans Brass; Baton Rouge Kingfish; Atlantic City Boardwalk Bullies; Charlotte Checkers
- NHL draft: 82nd overall, 1994; Winnipeg Jets
- Playing career: 1994–2005

Steve Cheredaryk (born November 20, 1975) is a Canadian retired professional ice hockey defenceman. Cheredaryk was selected by the Winnipeg Jets in the 4th round (82nd overall) of the 1994 NHL entry draft.

A native of Calgary, Alberta, Cheredaryk played major junior hockey with the Medicine Hat Tigers of the Western Hockey League. Drafted by the Winnipeg Jets in 1994, he went on to play 126 games in the American Hockey League and 371 games in the ECHL before retiring from professional hockey during the 2004–05 season.

== Career statistics ==
			Regular season					Playoffs
Season	Team	League	GP	G	A	Pts	PIM	GP	G	A	Pts	PIM
1990–91	Grande Prairie Selects Bantam AAA	AMBHL	29	2	21	23	81	—	—	—	—	—
1992–93	Medicine Hat Tigers	WHL	67	1	9	10	88	10	0	1	1	16
1993–94	Medicine Hat Tigers	WHL	72	3	35	38	151	3	0	1	1	9
1994–95	Medicine Hat Tigers	WHL	70	3	26	29	193	5	0	1	1	13
1994–95	Springfield Falcons	AHL	3	0	1	1	0	—	—	—	—	—
1995–96	Knoxville Cherokees	ECHL	13	0	10	10	72	6	2	4	6	12
1995–96	Springfield Falcons	AHL	32	0	1	1	36	—	—	—	—	—
1996–97	Mississippi Sea Wolves	ECHL	9	0	1	1	33	—	—	—	—	—
1996–97	Springfield Falcons	AHL	46	1	2	3	69	—	—	—	—	—
1996–97	Fredericton Canadiens	AHL	14	0	1	1	24	—	—	—	—	—
1997–98	New Orleans Brass	ECHL	59	4	16	20	214	2	0	0	0	16
1997–98	Fredericton Canadiens	AHL	4	0	0	0	8	—	—	—	—	—
1998–99	New Orleans Brass	ECHL	58	8	15	23	135	11	3	4	7	26
1999–00	New Orleans Brass	ECHL	56	8	17	25	192	3	0	0	0	23
1999–00	Lowell Lock Monsters	AHL	16	1	4	5	22	—	—	—	—	—
2000–01	New Orleans Brass	ECHL	57	5	24	29	219	8	1	5	6	14
2000–01	Lowell Lock Monsters	AHL	3	0	0	0	2	—	—	—	—	—
2001–02	New Orleans Brass	ECHL	67	2	12	14	218	1	0	0	0	2
2001–02	Saint John Flames	AHL	6	1	1	2	13	—	—	—	—	—
2002–03	Lowell Lock Monsters	AHL	2	0	0	0	0	—	—	—	—	—
2002–03	Baton Rouge Kingfish	ECHL	31	6	13	19	93	—	—	—	—	—
2002–03	Atlantic City Boardwalk Bullies	ECHL	19	0	1	1	51	19	1	5	6	20
2003–04	Charlotte Checkers	ECHL	2	0	1	1	4	—	—	—	—	—
ECHL totals			371	33	110	143	1,231	50	7	18	25	113
