= Alexei Krivchenkov =

Russian ice hockey player

- Born: 11 June 1974 (age 51) Usolye-Sibirskoye, Russian SFSR, Soviet Union
- Height: 6 ft 1 in (185 cm)
- Weight: 205 lb (93 kg; 14 st 9 lb)
- Position: Defence
- Shot: Left
- Played for: CSKA Moscow; Severstal Cherepovets; Sibir Novosibirsk; Vityaz Chekhov; Metallurg Novokuznetsk
- NHL draft: 76th overall, 1994; Pittsburgh Penguins
- Playing career: 1994–2011

Alexei Krivchenkov (born 11 June 1974) is a Russian former professional ice hockey defenceman. He was selected by the Pittsburgh Penguins in the 3rd round (76th overall) of the 1994 NHL entry draft.

Krivchenkov played in the Russian Superleague and Kontinental Hockey League for CSKA Moscow, Severstal Cherepovets, Sibir Novosibirsk, Vityaz Chekhov and Metallurg Novokuznetsk.
