= Marc Dupuis =

Canadian ice hockey player

- Born: April 22, 1976 (age 50) Cornwall, Ontario, Canada
- Height: 6 ft 0 in (183 cm)
- Weight: 200 lb (91 kg; 14 st 4 lb)
- Position: Defence
- Shot: Left
- Played for: AHL; Rochester Americans; Hershey Bears; IHL; Indianapolis Ice; Orlando Solar Bears; Fort Wayne Komets; ECHL; Columbus Chill; Pensacola Ice Pilots; WPHL/CHL; Amarillo Rattlers; UHL; Knoxville Speed
- NHL draft: 118th overall, 1994; Chicago Blackhawks
- Playing career: 1996–2002

Marc Dupuis (born April 22, 1976) is a Canadian retired professional ice hockey defenceman. Dupuis was selected by the Chicago Blackhawks in the fifth round (118th overall) of the 1994 NHL entry draft.

Dupuis played six seasons of professional hockey, mostly in the International Hockey League, where he skated in 151 contests to record 47 points and 102 penalty minutes. He also played 84 regular season games in the ECHL, as well as stints in the American Hockey League, Western Professional Hockey League, United Hockey League, and Central Hockey League.

Dupuis retired from professional hockey following the 2001–02 season, but remained active in the Quebec Senior Hockey League as a player with the Cornwall Comets.

In 2012, Dupuis was inducted into the Cornwall Sports Hall of Fame.
