= Kyle McLaren =

Canadian ice hockey player (born 1977)

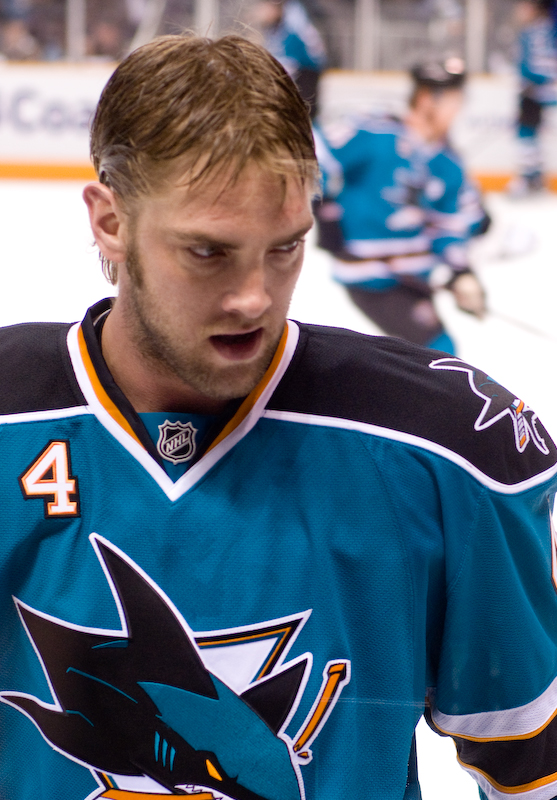
- McLaren with the San Jose Sharks in 2008
- Born: June 18, 1977 (age 49) Humboldt, Saskatchewan, Canada
- Height: 6 ft 4 in (193 cm)
- Weight: 230 lb (104 kg; 16 st 6 lb)
- Position: Defence
- Shot: Left
- Played for: Boston Bruins; San Jose Sharks
- National team: Canada
- NHL draft: 9th overall, 1995; Boston Bruins
- Playing career: 1995–2009

Kyle Edgar McLaren (born June 18, 1977) is a Canadian former professional ice hockey defenceman who played 12 seasons in the National Hockey League (NHL) for the Boston Bruins and San Jose Sharks.

== Playing career ==
McLaren was drafted by the Boston Bruins in the first round, ninth-overall, during the 1995 NHL entry draft. He played his first NHL season when he was just eighteen in the 1995–96 season, and was the youngest player on an NHL roster that year. Kyle later became a Bruins Assistant Captain.

In Game 4 of the Eastern Conference Quarterfinals on April 25 in the 2002 playoffs, McLaren injured Richard Zednik of the Montreal Canadiens with an elbow to the face. McLaren received a three-game suspension from the league. Despite Boston winning the game 5–2, they would lose the series to the Canadiens in six games.

By July 2002 McLaren was dissatisfied with his perceived role in the Bruins organization. That summer, McLaren had been offered a two-way contract by Bruins general manager Mike O'Connell, meaning that McLaren could be made to report to the minor league affiliate of the Bruins, the Providence Bruins of the AHL, where he would earn but a small fraction of his NHL salary. An established NHL player at that point, McLaren was insulted and demanded a trade.

In a three-way deal, San Jose traded their 1999 first-round pick Jeff Jillson and goaltender Jeff Hackett, previously acquired from Montreal for Niklas Sundstrom and a third-round pick, to Boston for McLaren and a fourth-round selection in the 2004 NHL entry draft.

During the 2003 season he was struck in the face by a slapshot from Vancouver's Sami Salo and missed 6 games due to his injury. For the remainder of the season he played with a clear visor. He stopped wearing a visor until partway through his 2005 season, when he returned with a yellow tinted visor because its color helped prevent glare of the ice from affecting him. McLaren switched back to a clear one during the 2007–08 season.

In 2006, McLaren signed a three-year contract worth US $7.5 million; the deal expired in June 2009. McLaren signed that deal citing how happy he was in San Jose and how much his family loved it there.

On October 7, 2008, McLaren was placed on waivers by San Jose Sharks' general manager Doug Wilson so that the team could accommodate the salaries of newly acquired defencemen Brad Lukowich, Dan Boyle, and Rob Blake within the constraints of the NHL salary cap. He played the season for the Sharks' AHL affiliate Worcester Sharks; his salary did not affect the San Jose Sharks' salary cap as he remained in Worcester.

On March 4, 2009, he was traded to the Philadelphia Flyers for a 2009 sixth-round draft pick, but that deal was later nixed as the Flyers reported that McLaren failed his physical.

McLaren received an invitation to attend training camp with the New York Rangers for the 2009–10 season, but did not make the team after failing a physical.

McLaren received another training camp invite by the Atlanta Thrashers for the 2010–11 NHL season on August 24, 2010, but was released on September 22, 2010.

== Awards ==
- 1992–93: Top Defenceman in the Western Canadian Bantam Tournament
- 1995–96: NHL - All-Rookie Team

== Career statistics ==
=== Regular season and playoffs ===
			Regular season					Playoffs
Season	Team	League	GP	G	A	Pts	PIM	GP	G	A	Pts	PIM
1992–93	Lethbridge Y's Men AAA	AMHL	60	28	28	56	84	—	—	—	—	—
1993–94	Tacoma Rockets	WHL	62	1	9	10	53	6	1	4	5	6
1994–95	Tacoma Rockets	WHL	47	13	19	32	68	4	1	1	2	4
1995–96	Boston Bruins	NHL	74	5	12	17	73	5	0	0	0	14
1996–97	Boston Bruins	NHL	58	5	9	14	54	—	—	—	—	—
1997–98	Boston Bruins	NHL	66	5	20	25	56	6	1	0	1	4
1998–99	Boston Bruins	NHL	52	6	18	24	48	12	0	3	3	10
1999–2000	Boston Bruins	NHL	71	8	11	19	67	—	—	—	—	—
2000–01	Boston Bruins	NHL	58	5	12	17	53	—	—	—	—	—
2001–02	Boston Bruins	NHL	38	0	8	8	19	4	0	0	0	20
2002–03	San Jose Sharks	NHL	33	0	8	8	30	—	—	—	—	—
2003–04	San Jose Sharks	NHL	64	2	22	24	60	16	0	3	3	10
2005–06	San Jose Sharks	NHL	77	2	21	23	66	11	0	3	3	4
2006–07	San Jose Sharks	NHL	67	5	12	17	61	11	0	4	4	10
2007–08	San Jose Sharks	NHL	61	3	8	11	84	5	0	0	0	6
2008–09	Worcester Sharks	AHL	22	1	6	7	19	7	0	1	1	2
NHL totals			719	46	161	207	671	70	1	13	14	78

=== International ===
Year	Team	Event	GP	G	A	Pts	PIM
2001	Canada	WC	7	0	2	2	2

Preceded by Evgeni Ryabchikov	Boston Bruins first-round draft pick 1995	Succeeded by Sean Brown
