= Evgeni Ryabchikov =

Russian ice hockey player (born 1974)

- Born: January 16, 1974 (age 52) Yaroslavl, USSR
- Height: 6 ft 0 in (183 cm)
- Weight: 187 lb (85 kg; 13 st 5 lb)
- Position: Goaltender
- Caught: Left
- Played for: HC Lada Togliatti
- NHL draft: 21st overall, 1994; Boston Bruins
- Playing career: 1994–2003

Evgeni Yurevich Ryabchikov (Russian: Евгений Юрьевич Рябчиков; born January 16, 1974) is a Russian former professional ice hockey goaltender. He was drafted in the first round, 21st overall, by the Boston Bruins in the 1994 NHL entry draft. He was named to the tournament all-star team of the 1994 World Junior Ice Hockey Championships. He never played in the National Hockey League, however.

== Career statistics ==
=== Regular season and playoffs ===
			Regular season									Playoffs
Season	Team	League	GP	W	L	T	MIN	GA	SO	GAA	SV%	GP	W	L	MIN	GA	SO	GAA	SV%
1992–93	Molot-Prikamye Perm	IHL	28	—	—	—	—	—	—	3.66	—	—	—	—	—	—	—	—	—
1993–94	Metallurg Magnitogorsk	IHL	1	—	—	—	—	—	—	1.00	—	—	—	—	—	—	—	—	—
1994–95	Providence Bruins	AHL	14	8	6	1	721	42	0	3.49	.879	—	—	—	—	—	—	—	—
1995–96	Charlotte Checkers	ECHL	1	0	1	0	29	4	0	8.24	.765	—	—	—	—	—	—	—	—
1995–96	Huntington Blizzard	ECHL	8	3	3	0	359	25	0	4.17	.870	—	—	—	—	—	—	—	—
1995–95	Erie Panthers	ECHL	16	2	7	1	857	50	0	3.50	.901	—	—	—	—	—	—	—	—
1995–96	Providence Bruins	AHL	1	—	—	—	40	2	0	3.00	.867	—	—	—	—	—	—	—	—
1996–97	Providence Bruins	AHL	1	—	—	—	20	2	0	6.00	.778	—	—	—	—	—	—	—	—
1996–97	Charlotte Checkers	ECHL	14	5	6	2	733	47	1	3.84	.886	—	—	—	—	—	—	—	—
1996–97	Dayton Bombers	ECHL	15	6	4	3	841	60	0	4.28	.868	—	—	—	—	—	—	—	—
1997–98	Waco Wizards	WCHL	10	2	8	0	591	47	0	4.77	.842	—	—	—	—	—	—	—	—
1997–98	Odessa Jackalopes	WCHL	7	2	4	0	344	45	0	7.83	.841	—	—	—	—	—	—	—	—
1998–99	Molot-Prikamye Perm	RSL	12	—	—	—	—	31	—	2.59	—	5	—	—	—	7	—	2.43	—
1999–00	Lada Togliatti	RSL	14	—	—	—	—	23	—	1.88	.905	—	—	—	—	—	—	—	—
1999–00	Lada-2 Tolgiatti	RUS-3	10	—	—	—	—	—	—	—	—	—	—	—	—	—	—	—	—
2000–01	Lada Togliatti	RSL	3	—	—	—	—	—	—	2.46	.896	—	—	—	—	—	—	—	—
2000–01	HC Lipetsk	RUS-2	18	—	—	—	—	—	—	2.19	—	—	—	—	—	—	—	—	—
2000–01	Krylya Sovetov-2	RUS-2	4	—	—	—	—	—	—	2.62	—	—	—	—	—	—	—	—	—
2001–02	Molot-Prikamye Perm	RSL	34	—	—	—	—	84	—	2.79	.870	—	—	—	—	—	—	—	—
2002–03	Molot-Prikamye Perm	RSL	18	—	—	—	—	36	—	2.96	.881	—	—	—	—	—	—	—	—
2003-04	HC Rybinsk	RUS-2	3	—	—	—	—	—	—	4.77	—	—	—	—	—	—	—	—	—

=== International ===
Year	Team	Event	GP	W	L	T	MIN	GA	SO	GAA	SV%
1994	Russia	WJC	7	5	1	1	—	—	—	2.43	.874
Junior totals			7	5	1	1	—	—	—	2.43	.874

Preceded by Kevyn Adams	Boston Bruins first-round draft pick 1994	Succeeded by Kyle McLaren
