= Brian White (ice hockey) =

American ice hockey player

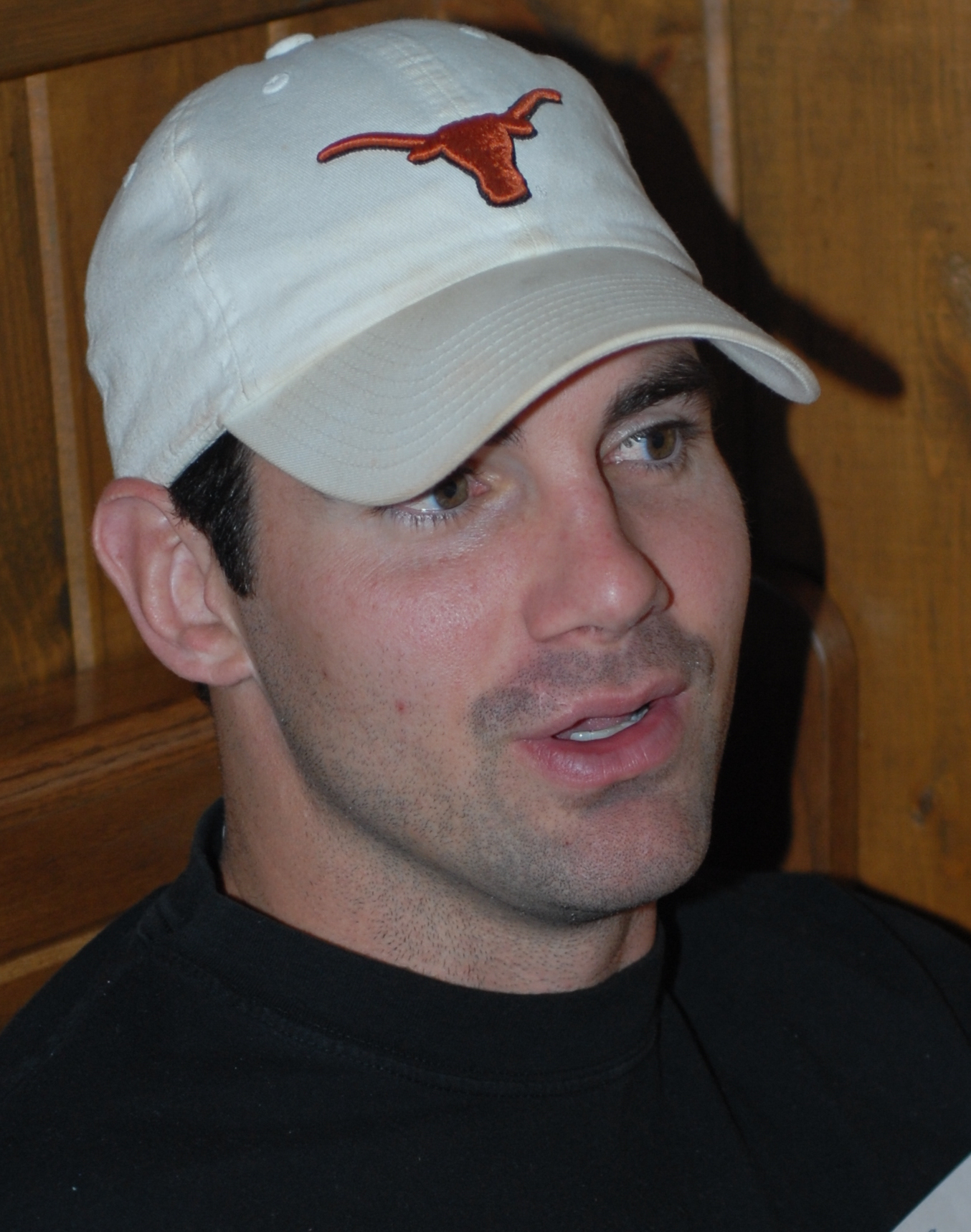
- White in 2006
- Born: February 7, 1976 (age 50) Winchester, Massachusetts, U.S.
- Height: 6 ft 1 in (185 cm)
- Weight: 195 lb (88 kg; 13 st 13 lb)
- Position: Defense
- Shot: Right
- Played for: Colorado Avalanche; Iserlohn Roosters; Tappara
- NHL draft: 268th overall, 1994; Tampa Bay Lightning
- Playing career: 1998–2008

Brian L. White (born February 7, 1976) is an American former professional ice hockey defenseman who played two games in the National Hockey League with the Colorado Avalanche.

== Playing career ==
White was selected 268th overall by the Tampa Bay Lightning in the 1994 NHL entry draft, He had a four-year collegiate career at the University of Maine before signing with the Colorado Avalanche and playing 2 games in the NHL in the 1998–99 NHL season. Spending the next two years with Hershey Bears in the minor leagues, White was then signed by the Mighty Ducks of Anaheim on August 14, 2001. He never had another chance to play in the NHL, and after the 2003–04 season he left for the Iserlohn Roosters of the DEL.

== Career statistics ==
			Regular season					Playoffs
Season	Team	League	GP	G	A	Pts	PIM	GP	G	A	Pts	PIM
1994–95	University of Maine	HE	28	1	1	2	16	—	—	—	—	—
1995–96	University of Maine	HE	39	0	4	4	18	—	—	—	—	—
1996–97	University of Maine	HE	35	4	12	16	36	—	—	—	—	—
1997–98	University of Maine	HE	33	0	12	12	45	—	—	—	—	—
1997–98	Long Beach Ice Dogs	IHL	1	0	0	0	0	—	—	—	—	—
1998–99	Hershey Bears	AHL	71	4	8	12	41	4	0	1	1	2
1998–99	Colorado Avalanche	NHL	2	0	0	0	0	—	—	—	—	—
1999–00	Hershey Bears	AHL	79	3	19	22	78	14	0	3	3	21
2000–01	Hershey Bears	AHL	75	2	9	11	44	9	0	1	1	12
2001–02	Cincinnati Mighty Ducks	AHL	73	0	8	8	32	3	0	0	0	2
2002–03	Providence Bruins	AHL	51	2	5	7	34	4	0	1	1	8
2003–04	Providence Bruins	AHL	71	2	7	9	40	2	0	0	0	0
2004–05	Iserlohn Roosters	DEL	52	2	5	7	48	—	—	—	—	—
2005–06	Tappara	SM-l	54	0	0	0	84	6	0	0	0	2
2006–07	Long Beach Ice Dogs	ECHL	69	1	9	10	105	—	—	—	—	—
2006–07	Providence Bruins	AHL	—	—	—	—	—	10	1	0	1	10
2007–08	Kalamazoo Wings	IHL	9	0	1	1	0	—	—	—	—	—
2007–08	Worcester Sharks	AHL	2	0	0	0	0	—	—	—	—	—
NHL totals			2	0	0	0	0	—	—	—	—	—
