= Vadim Sharifijanov =

Russian ice hockey player

- Born: December 23, 1975 (age 50) Ufa, Russian SFSR, Soviet Union
- Height: 5 ft 10 in (178 cm)
- Weight: 205 lb (93 kg; 14 st 9 lb)
- Position: Right wing
- Shot: Left
- Played for: New Jersey Devils; Vancouver Canucks
- National team: Russia
- NHL draft: 25th overall, 1994; New Jersey Devils
- Playing career: 1992–2010

Vadim Rimovich Sharifijanov (Russian: Вадим Римович Шарифьянов; born December 23, 1975) is a Russian former professional ice hockey right winger who spent parts of three seasons in the National Hockey League with the New Jersey Devils and the Vancouver Canucks.

== Playing career ==
Sharifijanov burst onto the international hockey scene in 1992, when he was named a tournament all-star after scoring 8 goals in 6 games at the European U18 Championships at the age of only 16. After two solid seasons with Salavat Yulaev Ufa of the Russian Super League, he was selected in the first round (25th overall) of the 1994 NHL entry draft by the New Jersey Devils. He spent one more year in Russia with HC CSKA Moscow before coming to North America, and also turned in a stellar performance at the 1995 World Junior Championships, recording 10 points in 7 games.

Sharifijanov joined the Albany River Rats, New Jersey's AHL affiliate, after the Russian season ended in 1995, and scored 2 points in his first North American professional game. However, his progress to the NHL would be slow in a deep New Jersey system, and his first three full seasons were spent almost entirely in Albany, appearing in only 2 NHL games during the 1996–97 campaign.

In 1998–99, Sharifijanov was promoted to the Devils and turned in a successful rookie season, recording 11 goals and 27 points in just 53 games.

However, in 1999–2000 his play fell off considerably. After scoring just 3 goals in 20 games for the Devils, and showing a marked drop-off in his defensive play, Sharifijanov was shipped to the Vancouver Canucks for a draft pick. In Vancouver, he made an instant impact, scoring a goal on his first shift as a Canuck, but it was all downhill from there as he quickly became a healthy scratch and earned a reputation for lazy play. He finished the season with just 5 goals and 10 points in 37 games, as well as a +/- rating of a dismal -13.

The 2000–01 season would prove no better, as Sharifijanov failed to crack the Canucks' roster out of training camp and was assigned to the Kansas City Blades of the International Hockey League, where he spent the entire season. Released by the Canucks, Sharifijanov returned to Russia. He would continue to struggle in Russia, however, and would suit up for 6 different Super League teams in the next three seasons without making any significant impact for any of them. After brief stints in France and Sweden, Sharifijanov signed on with Sputnik Nizhny Tagil of the Supreme Hockey League in 2005.

In 92 NHL games, Sharifijanov recorded 16 goals and 21 assists for 37 points, along with 50 penalty minutes. His sudden decline in ability while still a young player remains unexplained - at age 23, he was a key young player on an elite NHL team, and by the time he turned 26 he was already unable to hold down a regular job in the Russian Superleague.

== Career statistics ==
=== Regular season and playoffs ===
			Regular season					Playoffs
Season	Team	League	GP	G	A	Pts	PIM	GP	G	A	Pts	PIM
1990–91	Avangard Ufa	URS.3	2	0	0	0	2	—	—	—	—	—
1991–92	Avangard Ufa	CIS.3	17	1	1	2	8	—	—	—	—	—
1992–93	Salavat Yulaev Ufa	IHL	37	6	4	10	16	2	1	0	1	0
1992–93	Novoil Ufa	RUS.2	1	0	0	0	0	—	—	—	—	—
1993–94	Salavat Yulaev Ufa	IHL	46	10	6	16	36	5	3	0	3	4
1994–95	CSKA Moscow	IHL	34	7	3	10	26	2	0	0	0	0
1994–95	CSKA–2 Moscow	RUS.2	1	1	1	2	0	—	—	—	—	—
1994–95	Albany River Rats	AHL	1	1	1	2	0	9	3	3	6	10
1995–96	Albany River Rats	AHL	69	14	28	42	28	—	—	—	—	—
1996–97	Albany River Rats	AHL	70	14	27	41	89	10	3	3	6	6
1996–97	New Jersey Devils	NHL	2	0	0	0	0	—	—	—	—	—
1997–98	Albany River Rats	AHL	72	23	27	50	69	12	4	9	13	6
1998–99	New Jersey Devils	NHL	53	11	16	27	28	4	0	0	0	0
1998–99	Albany River Rats	AHL	2	1	1	2	0	—	—	—	—	—
1999–2000	New Jersey Devils	NHL	20	3	4	7	8	—	—	—	—	—
1999–2000	Vancouver Canucks	NHL	17	2	1	3	14	—	—	—	—	—
2000–01	Kansas City Blades	IHL	70	20	43	63	48	—	—	—	—	—
2001–02	Lada Togliatti	RSL	4	0	0	0	12	—	—	—	—	—
2001–02	Severstal–2 Cherepovets	RUS.3	3	2	1	3	0	—	—	—	—	—
2001–02	Severstal Cherepovets	RSL	25	9	3	12	2	2	0	0	0	6
2002–03	Spartak Moscow	RSL	23	2	2	4	12	—	—	—	—	—
2002–03	Krylya Sovetov Moscow	RSL	16	5	3	8	34	—	—	—	—	—
2003–04	Metallurg Novokuznetsk	RSL	7	0	1	1	6	—	—	—	—	—
2003–04	SKA Saint Petersburg	RSL	20	2	2	4	20	—	—	—	—	—
2003–04	SKA–2 Saint Petersburg	RUS.3	7	3	10	13	8	—	—	—	—	—
2004–05	Arboga IK	SWE.2	7	0	3	3	12	—	—	—	—	—
2004–05	Rapaces de Gap	FRA	15	2	7	9	12	4	2	3	5	12
2005–06	Sputnik Nizhny Tagil	RUS.2	47	8	15	23	78	5	0	1	1	2
2006–07	Sputnik Nizhny Tagil	RUS.2	54	11	24	35	48	4	0	2	2	2
2007–08	Toros Neftekamsk	RUS.2	45	12	23	35	30	4	2	0	2	2
2008–09	Toros Neftekamsk	RUS.2	36	11	12	23	46	—	—	—	—	—
2009–10	Rys Mozhaisk	RUS.2	23	4	10	14	22	—	—	—	—	—
2009–10	Yertis Pavlodar	KAZ	9	0	2	2	4	—	—	—	—	—
2009–10	Kazzinc–Torpedo	RUS.2	4	0	1	1	2	7	0	2	2	0
RUS totals			213	41	24	65	164	11	4	0	4	10
AHL totals			214	53	84	137	186	31	10	15	25	22
NHL totals			92	16	21	37	50	4	0	0	0	0

=== International ===
Year	Team	Event	GP	G	A	Pts	PIM
1992	Russia	EJC	6	8	1	9	8
1993	Russia	WJC	7	2	2	4	4
1993	Russia	EJC	6	3	5	8	6
1994	Russia	WJC	7	2	2	4	10
1995	Russia	WJC	7	4	6	10	6
Junior totals			33	19	16	35	34

Preceded by Denis Pederson	New Jersey Devils first-round draft pick 1994	Succeeded by Petr Sýkora
