= Chris Szysky =

Canadian ice hockey player

- Born: June 8, 1976 (age 49) Regina, Saskatchewan, Canada
- Height: 6 ft 0 in (183 cm)
- Weight: 205 lb (93 kg; 14 st 9 lb)
- Position: Right wing
- Shot: Right
- Played for: Swift Current Broncos (WHL); Canadian National Team; Grand Rapids Griffins (IHL/AHL); Sheffield Steelers (EIHL)
- National team: Canada
- NHL draft: 280th overall, 1994; Dallas Stars
- Playing career: 1997–2003

Chris Szysky (born June 8, 1976) is a Canadian former professional ice hockey player. He was selected by the Dallas Stars in the 11th round (280th overall) of the 1994 NHL entry draft.

Born in 1976 in Regina, Saskatchewan, Szysky played five seasons in the Western Hockey League with the Swift Current Broncos, before joining the Canada men's national ice hockey team for the 1997–98 and 1998-1999 seasons. Szysky played with the Canadian team at the 1999 Men's World Ice Hockey Championships.

Szysky turned professional with the Grand Rapids Griffins, joining the International Hockey League team for six games in the 1998–99 IHL season. He stayed with the Griffins through to the end of the 2001–02 AHL season, and completed his playing career the following season with the Sheffield Steelers in the British Elite Ice Hockey League.
