= Peter Ström =

Swedish ice hockey player

- Born: January 14, 1975 (age 51) Snöstorp, Sweden
- Height: 6 ft 0 in (183 cm)
- Weight: 198 lb (90 kg; 14 st 2 lb)
- Position: Right wing
- Shot: Right
- Played for: Västra Frölunda HC; SG Cortina; Timrå IK; SønderjyskE Ishockey; Växjö Lakers; Sparta Warriors; Halmstad HF
- NHL draft: 200th overall, 1994; Montreal Canadiens
- Playing career: 1992–2011

Peter Ström (born January 14, 1975) is a Swedish former professional ice hockey right winger. He was drafted 200th overall by the Montreal Canadiens in the 1994 NHL entry draft.

Ström played in Elitserien for Västra Frölunda HC and Timrå IK. He also played in the Italian Serie A for SG Cortina, the Danish Metal Ligaen for SønderjyskE Ishockey and in the Norwegian GET-ligaen for the Sparta Warriors.

He has two children: Alexander and Lovisa.

== Career statistics ==
			Regular season					Playoffs
Season	Team	League	GP	G	A	Pts	PIM	GP	G	A	Pts	PIM
1990–91	Halmstad HK	Division 3	—	—	—	—	—	—	—	—	—	—
1991–92	Halmstad HK	Division 3	—	—	—	—	—	—	—	—	—	—
1992–93	Västra Frölunda HC J20	Juniorallsvenskan	16	12	6	18	8	—	—	—	—	—
1992–93	Västra Frölunda HC	Allsvenskan D1	3	0	0	0	0	—	—	—	—	—
1993–94	Västra Frölunda HC	Elitserien	29	0	0	0	8	—	—	—	—	—
1994–95	Västra Frölunda HC J20	J20 SuperElit	9	12	6	18	6	—	—	—	—	—
1994–95	Västra Frölunda HC	Elitserien	16	0	3	3	10	—	—	—	—	—
1994–95	Västra Frölunda HC	Allsvenskan D1	12	8	10	18	10	5	2	3	5	0
1995–96	Västra Frölunda HC J20	J20 SuperElit	6	2	3	5	0	—	—	—	—	—
1995–96	Västra Frölunda HC	Elitserien	35	7	8	15	10	13	0	3	3	0
1996–97	Västra Frölunda HC	Elitserien	49	7	16	23	24	3	0	0	0	2
1997–98	Västra Frölunda HC	Elitserien	46	6	15	21	22	7	0	4	4	0
1998–99	Västra Frölunda HC	Elitserien	49	17	15	32	18	4	0	2	2	0
1999–00	Västra Frölunda HC	Elitserien	50	12	26	38	20	5	0	1	1	2
2000–01	Västra Frölunda HC	Elitserien	50	15	18	33	16	5	0	3	3	6
2001–02	Västra Frölunda HC	Elitserien	50	12	11	23	12	10	2	2	4	2
2002–03	Västra Frölunda HC	Elitserien	50	8	7	15	16	13	2	1	3	0
2003–04	Västra Frölunda HC	Elitserien	50	2	8	10	43	7	0	0	0	2
2004–05	SG Cortina	Italy	36	17	21	38	8	18	11	5	16	2
2005–06	Timrå IK	Elitserien	50	4	7	11	10	—	—	—	—	—
2006–07	SønderjyskE Ishockey	Denmark	34	7	15	22	24	13	5	0	5	8
2007–08	Växjö Lakers HC	HockeyAllsvenskan	44	12	21	33	34	3	1	2	3	12
2008–09	Sparta Sarpsborg	Norway	10	1	4	5	6	—	—	—	—	—
2008–09	Växjö Lakers HC	HockeyAllsvenskan	26	8	8	16	20	9	1	3	4	10
2009–10	Halmstad Hammers HC	Division 1	31	7	36	43	24	—	—	—	—	—
2010–11	Halmstad Hammers HC	Division 1	20	3	23	26	10	2	0	3	3	0
Elitserien totals			524	90	134	224	209	70	4	16	20	14
