= Steve Plouffe =

Canadian ice hockey player

- Born: November 23, 1975 (age 49); Montreal, Quebec, Canada
- Height: 5 ft 11 in (180 cm)
- Weight: 200 lb (91 kg; 14 st 4 lb)
- Position: Goaltender
- Caught: Left
- Played for: Fort Worth Fire; Johnstown Chiefs; Fort Worth Brahmas; Amur Khabarovsk; Spartak Moscow; Sorel Royaux; Sorel-Tracy Mission
- NHL draft: 168th overall, 1994; Buffalo Sabres
- Playing career: 1995–2006

Steve Plouffe (born November 23, 1975) is a Canadian retired professional ice hockey goaltender.

== Career ==
Plouffe started his career in the Central Hockey League with the Fort Worth Fire. As a member of the Fire, Plouffe led the league with 38 wins and was a member of the 1996-97 team that won the CHL Championship. The following season, Plouffe played as the starting goaltender for the Johnstown Chiefs. As a member of the Chiefs, Plouffe won 11 games in 44 appearances and set an ECHL single-season record for the longest winless streak with 11 games without a win. The record has since been broken several times, which includes a 22-game winless streak by former Stockton Thunder goaltender Jeff Weber during the 2005-06 ECHL season. He returned to Fort Worth for the 1998-99 season, where he skated with the Fort Worth Brahmas of the WPHL

Plouffe spent three seasons playing in the Russian Superleague. He skated with the Amur Khabarovsk from 1999 until 2001 and returned to Russia in 2002 where he made 40 appearances with the Spartak Moscow.

Plouffe returned to Canada to skate in the LNAH for three seasons. He skated with the Sorel Royeaux for the 2003-04 season. The Royeaux folded after the season, but the St. Jean Mission moved from Saint-Jean-sur-Richelieu to Sorel in the offseason, allowing Plouffe to stay in Sorel from 2004 to 2006 as a member of the newly named Sorel-Tracy Mission to finish his career.

== Awards ==
=== CHL ===
- 1996-97 Ray Miron President's Cup
- 1996-97 Presidents Cup Playoff MVP
