= Alexander Korobolin =

Russian ice hockey player (born 1976)

- Born: March 12, 1976 (age 50) Chelyabinsk, Russian SFSR, Soviet Union
- Height: 6 ft 4 in (193 cm)
- Weight: 220 lb (100 kg; 15 st 10 lb)
- Position: Defence
- Shot: Left
- Played for: HC Mechel; Avangard Omsk; Molot-Prikamye Perm; HC Sibir Novosibirsk
- NHL draft: 100th overall, 1994; New York Rangers
- Playing career: 1992–2012

Alexander Korobolin (born March 12, 1976) is a Russian former ice hockey defenceman.

Korobolin was drafted 100th overall by the New York Rangers in the 1994 NHL entry draft. He played with the Rangers' American Hockey League affiliate the Hartford Wolf Pack during the 1999–00 AHL season where he featured in 22 regular season games and scored one goal.

Korobolin also played in the Russian Superleague for HC Mechel, Avangard Omsk, Molot-Prikamye Perm, HC Sibir Novosibirsk.
