= Jeff Williams (ice hockey) =

Canadian ice hockey player

- Born: February 11, 1976 (age 50) Pointe-Claire, Quebec, Canada
- Height: 6 ft 0 in (183 cm)
- Weight: 194 lb (88 kg; 13 st 12 lb)
- Position: Left wing
- Shot: Left
- Played for: AHL; Albany River Rats; Victoria Salmon Kings; Portland Pirates; ECHL; Raleigh IceCaps; Victoria Salmon Kings; Wheeling Nailers; IHL; Orlando Solar Bears; UHL; Quad City Mallards; Europe; Tappara (SM-liiga); HC Merano (Serie A); Brynäs IF (Elitserien); Ayr Scottish Eagles (BISL)
- NHL draft: 181st overall, 1994; New Jersey Devils
- Playing career: 1996–2005

Jeff Williams (born February 11, 1976) is a Canadian former professional ice hockey player.

== Career ==
Williams was selected by the New Jersey Devils in the seventh round (181st overall) of the 1994 NHL entry draft.

Over the course of his 10-year professional career, Williams played 334 regular-season games in the American Hockey League, as well as games in the Finnish SM-liiga and Swedish Elitserien.

== Awards and honours ==
Award	Year
William Hanley Trophy – OHL Most Sportsmanlike Player	1995–96
AHL Top Goal Scorer	1998–99
AHL Second All-Star Team	1998–99

== Career statistics ==
			Regular season					Playoffs
Season	Team	League	GP	G	A	Pts	PIM	GP	G	A	Pts	PIM
1991–92	North York Rangers AAA	Midget	56	53	51	104	23	—	—	—	—	—
1991–92	Newmarket 87's	CJHL	4	1	1	2	4	—	—	—	—	—
1992–93	Newmarket 87's	CJHL	45	28	35	63	18	—	—	—	—	—
1993–94	Newmarket Hurricanes	CJHL	4	1	1	2	4	—	—	—	—	—
1993–94	Guelph Storm	OHL	62	14	12	26	19	—	—	—	—	—
1994–95	Guelph Storm	OHL	52	15	32	47	21	—	—	—	—	—
1995–96	Guelph Storm	OHL	63	15	49	64	42	—	—	—	—	—
1996–97	Albany River Rats	AHL	46	13	20	33	12	15	1	2	3	15
1996–97	Raleigh IceCaps	ECHL	20	4	8	12	8	—	—	—	—	—
1997–98	Albany River Rats	AHL	58	13	12	25	20	12	5	6	11	2
1998–99	Albany River Rats	AHL	74	46	27	73	39	5	1	2	3	0
1999–2000	Albany River Rats	AHL	71	29	20	49	24	—	—	—	—	—
1999–2000	Orlando Solar Bears	IHL	6	2	4	6	0	—	—	—	—	—
2000–01	Syracuse Crunch	AHL	76	22	27	49	36	—	—	—	—	—
2001–02	Brynäs IF	SEL	12	0	1	1	4	—	—	—	—	—
2001–02	Tappara	SM-l	14	0	3	3	14	—	—	—	—	—
2001–02	HC Merano	ITA	12	6	4	10	0	—	—	—	—	—
2002–03	Scottish Eagles	GBR	8	2	1	3	4	—	—	—	—	—
2002–03	Portland Pirates	AHL	9	0	1	1	4	—	—	—	—	—
2002–03	Quad City Mallards	UHL	41	29	28	57	26	—	—	—	—	—
2003–04	Quad City Mallards	UHL	70	47	38	85	30	—	—	—	—	—
2004–05	Victoria Salmon Kings	ECHL	25	6	5	11	4	—	—	—	—	—
AHL totals			334	123	107	230	135	32	7	10	17	17
