= Zdeněk Skořepa =

Czech ice hockey player

Zdenek Skorepa
- Born: August 10, 1976 (age 49) Duchcov, Czechoslovakia
- Height: 6 ft 0 in (183 cm)
- Weight: 203 lb (92 kg; 14 st 7 lb)
- Position: Forward
- Shoots: Left
- Czech Extraliga team: HC Slavia Praha
- National team: Czech Republic
- NHL draft: 103rd overall, 1994; New Jersey Devils
- Playing career: 1993–present

Zdeněk Skořepa (born August 10, 1976 in Duchcov) is a Czech professional ice hockey player. He was selected by the New Jersey Devils in the 4th round (103rd overall) of the 1994 NHL entry draft and played for Kingston Frontenacs, Albany River Rats, Detroit Vipers, 1994–1998, but then returned to the Czech republic to play 1999 onwards for various Czech teams. In the 2011-2012 season he played with SK Kadaň.
