= 1994 NHL entry draft =

1994 North American ice hockey draft

General information
- Date: June 28–29, 1994
- Location: Hartford Civic Center; Hartford, Connecticut, U.S.

Overview
- 286 total selections in 11 rounds
- First selection: (Canada) Ed Jovanovski (Florida Panthers)
- Hall of Famers: 1: RW Daniel Alfredsson

The 1994 NHL entry draft was the 32nd draft for the National Hockey League. It was held on June 28–29, 1994, at the Hartford Civic Center in Hartford, Connecticut.

The last active players in the NHL from this draft class were Eric Boulton and Patrik Elias, who both played their last NHL games in the 2015–16 season.

== Top prospects ==
Source: NHL Central Scouting

Ranking	North American skaters	European skaters
1	(Czech Republic) Radek Bonk (C)	(Russia) Oleg Tverdovsky (D)
2	(Canada) Jeff O'Neill (C)	(Sweden) Mattias Ohlund (D)
3	(Canada) Ed Jovanovski (D)	(Russia) Alexander Kharlamov (RW)
4	(Canada) Ryan Smyth (LW)	(Czech Republic) Josef Marha (C)
5	(United States) Jason Bonsignore (C)	(Sweden) Johan Davidsson (C)
6	(Canada) Jeff Friesen (LW)	(Russia) Vadim Sharifijanov (RW)
7	(Canada) Ethan Moreau (LW)	(Czech Republic) Stanislav Neckar (D)
8	(United States) Deron Quint (D)	(Finland) Jussi Tarvainen (C)
9	(Canada) Jason Wiemer (C)	(Czech Republic) Patrik Elias (LW)
10	(Canada) Wayne Primeau (C)	(Sweden) Nils Ekman (RW)

Ranking	North American goalies	European goalies
1	(Canada) Jamie Storr	(Russia) Evgeni Ryabchikov
2	(Canada) Jose Theodore	(Sweden) Peter Olsson
3	(Canada) Dan Cloutier	(Finland) Jussi Markkanen

== Selections by round ==
Club teams are located in North America unless otherwise noted.

=== Round one ===
= NHL All-Star team ·	= NHL All-Star (Note: Players are identified as an All-Star if they were selected for the All-Star game at any time in their career.) ·	= NHL All-Star and NHL All-Star team ·	= Hall of Famers

#	Player	Nationality	NHL team	College/junior/club team
1	Ed Jovanovski (D)	Canada	Florida Panthers	Windsor Spitfires (OHL)
2	Oleg Tverdovsky (D)	Russia	Mighty Ducks of Anaheim	Krylya Sovetov (Russia)
3	Radek Bonk (C)	Czech Republic	Ottawa Senators	Las Vegas Thunder (IHL)
4	Jason Bonsignore (C)	United States	Edmonton Oilers (from Winnipeg)^{1}	Niagara Falls Thunder (OHL)
5	Jeff O'Neill (C)	Canada	Hartford Whalers	Guelph Storm (OHL)
6	Ryan Smyth (LW)	Canada	Edmonton Oilers	Moose Jaw Warriors (WHL)
7	Jamie Storr (G)	Canada	Los Angeles Kings	Owen Sound Platers (OHL)
8	Jason Wiemer (C)	Canada	Tampa Bay Lightning	Portland Winter Hawks (WHL)
9	Brett Lindros (RW)	Canada	New York Islanders (from Quebec)^{2}	Kingston Frontenacs (OHL)
10	Nolan Baumgartner (D)	Canada	Washington Capitals (from Philadelphia via Quebec and Toronto)^{3}	Kamloops Blazers (WHL)
11	Jeff Friesen (LW)	Canada	San Jose Sharks	Regina Pats (WHL)
12	Wade Belak (RW)	Canada	Quebec Nordiques (from NY Islanders)^{4}	Saskatoon Blades (WHL)
13	Mattias Ohlund (D)	Sweden	Vancouver Canucks	Lulea HF (Sweden)
14	Ethan Moreau (LW)	Canada	Chicago Blackhawks	Niagara Falls Thunder (OHL)
15	Alexander Kharlamov (RW)	Russia	Washington Capitals	CSKA Moscow (Russia)
16	Eric Fichaud (G)	Canada	Toronto Maple Leafs (from St. Louis via Washington)^{5}	Chicoutimi Sagueneens (QMJHL)
17	Wayne Primeau (C)	Canada	Buffalo Sabres	Owen Sound Platers (OHL)
18	Brad Brown (D)	Canada	Montreal Canadiens	North Bay Centennials (OHL)
19	Chris Dingman (LW)	Canada	Calgary Flames	Brandon Wheat Kings (WHL)
20	Jason Botterill (LW)	Canada	Dallas Stars	University of Michigan (CCHA)
21	Evgeni Ryabchikov (G)	Russia	Boston Bruins	Molot Perm (Russia)
22	Jeff Kealty (D)	United States	Quebec Nordiques (from Toronto)^{6}	Catholic Memorial High School (USHS–MA)
23	Yan Golubovsky (D)	Russia	Detroit Red Wings	Dynamo Moscow (Russia)
24	Chris Wells (C)	Canada	Pittsburgh Penguins	Seattle Thunderbirds (WHL)
25	Vadim Sharifijanov (RW)	Russia	New Jersey Devils	Salavat Yulaev Ufa (Russia)
26	Dan Cloutier (G)	Canada	New York Rangers	Sault Ste. Marie Greyhounds (OHL)

Notes

1. The Winnipeg Jets' first-round pick went to the Edmonton Oilers as the result of a trade on March 15, 1994, that sent Dave Manson and St. Louis's sixth-round pick in 1994 (146th overall) to Winnipeg in exchange for Boris Mironov, Mats Lindgren, Florida's fourth-round pick in 1994 (79th overall) and this pick.
2. The Quebec Nordiques' first-round pick went to the New York Islanders as the result of a trade on June 28 that sent Uwe Krupp and a first-round pick in 1994 (12th overall) to Quebec in exchange for Ron Sutter and this pick.
3. The Philadelphia Flyers' first-round pick went to the Washington Capitals as the result of a trade on June 28 that sent Mike Ridley and St. Louis's first-round pick in 1994 (16th overall) to Toronto in exchange for Rob Pearson and this pick.
  Toronto previously acquired this pick as the result of a trade on June 28, that sent Wendel Clark, Sylvain Lefebvre, Landon Wilson and a first-round pick in 1994 (22nd overall) to Quebec in exchange for Mats Sundin, Garth Butcher, Todd Warriner and this pick.
  Quebec previously acquired this pick as the result of a trade on June 30, 1992, that sent the Eric Lindros to Philadelphia in exchange for Ron Hextall, Peter Forsberg, Steve Duchesne, Kerry Huffman, Mike Ricci, a first-round pick in 1993, future considerations (Chris Simon on July 21, 1992), $15 million in cash and this pick.
4. The New York Islanders' first-round pick went to the Quebec Nordiques as the result of a trade on June 28 that sent Ron Sutter and a first-round pick in 1994 (9th overall) to New York in exchange for Uwe Krupp and this pick.
5. The St. Louis Blues' first-round pick went to the Toronto Maple Leafs as the result of a trade on June 28 that sent Rob Pearson and a first-round pick in 1994 (10th overall) to Washington in exchange for Mike Ridley and this pick.
  Washington previously acquired this pick as compensation for not matching an offer sheet from St. Louis to restricted free agent Scott Stevens on July 16, 1990.
6. The Toronto Maple Leafs' first-round pick went to the Quebec Nordiques as the result of a trade on June 28 that sent Mats Sundin, Garth Butcher, Todd Warriner and a first-round pick in 1994 (10th overall) to Toronto in exchange for Wendel Clark, Sylvain Lefebvre, Landon Wilson and this pick.

=== Round two ===
#	Player	Nationality	NHL team	College/junior/club team
27	Rhett Warrener (D)	Canada	Florida Panthers	Saskatoon Blades (WHL)
28	Johan Davidsson (C)	Sweden	Mighty Ducks of Anaheim	HV71 (Sweden)
29	Stanislav Neckar (D)	Czech Republic	Ottawa Senators	Ceske Budejovice (Czech Republic)
30	Deron Quint (D)	United States	Winnipeg Jets	Seattle Thunderbirds (WHL)
31	Jason Podollan (C)	Canada	Florida Panthers (from Hartford)^{1}	Spokane Chiefs (WHL)
32	Mike Watt (LW)	Canada	Edmonton Oilers	Stratford Cullitons (MOJHL)
33	Matt Johnson (LW)	Canada	Los Angeles Kings	Peterborough Petes (OHL)
34	Colin Cloutier (C)	Canada	Tampa Bay Lightning	Brandon Wheat Kings (WHL)
35	Josef Marha (C)	Czech Republic	Quebec Nordiques	Dukla Jihlava (Czech Republic)
36	Ryan Johnson (C)	Canada	Florida Panthers (from Philadelphia)^{2}	Thunder Bay Flyers (USHL)
37	Angel Nikolov (D)	Russia	San Jose Sharks	HC Litvinov (Czech Republic)
38	Jason Holland (D)	Canada	New York Islanders	Kamloops Blazers (WHL)
39	Robb Gordon (C)	Canada	Vancouver Canucks	Powell River Kings (BCHL)
40	Jean-Yves Leroux (LW)	Canada	Chicago Blackhawks	Beauport Harfangs (QMJHL)
41	Scott Cherrey (LW)	Canada	Washington Capitals	North Bay Centennials (OHL)
42	Dave Scatchard (C)	Canada	Vancouver Canucks (from St. Louis)^{3}	Portland Winter Hawks (WHL)
43	Curtis Brown (C)	Canada	Buffalo Sabres	Moose Jaw Warriors (WHL)
44	Jose Theodore (G)	Canada	Montreal Canadiens	Saint-Jean Lynx (QMJHL)
45	Dimitri Riabykin (D)	Russia	Calgary Flames	Moscow Dynamo (Russia)
46	Lee Jinman (C)	Canada	Dallas Stars	North Bay Centennials (OHL)
47	Daniel Goneau (LW)	Canada	Boston Bruins	Laval Titan (QMJHL)
48	Sean Haggerty (LW)	United States	Toronto Maple Leafs	Detroit Junior Red Wings (OHL)
49	Mathieu Dandenault (RW)	Canada	Detroit Red Wings	Sherbrooke Faucons (QMJHL)
50	Richard Park (RW)	United States	Pittsburgh Penguins	Belleville Bulls (OHL)
51	Patrik Elias (LW)	Czech Republic	New Jersey Devils	Poldi Kladno (Czech Republic)
52	Rudolf Vercik (LW)	Slovakia	New York Rangers	Slovan Bratislava (Slovakia)

Notes

1. The Hartford Whalers' second-round pick went to the Florida Panthers as compensation for allowing Hartford to select Chris Pronger in draft on June 26, 1994.
2. The Philadelphia Flyers' second-round pick went to the Florida Panthers as compensation for General Manager Bobby Clarke on June 15, 1994.
3. The St. Louis Blues' second-round pick went to the Vancouver Canucks with Craig Janney as compensation for not matching an offer sheet from St. Louis to restricted free agent Petr Nedved on March 4, 1994.

=== Round three ===
#	Player	Nationality	NHL team	College/junior/club team
53	Corey Neilson (D)	Canada	Edmonton Oilers (from Florida)^{1}	North Bay Centennials (OHL)
54	Chris Murray (RW)	Canada	Montreal Canadiens (from Anaheim)^{2}	Kamloops Blazers (WHL)
55	Vadim Epanchintsev (C)	Russia	Tampa Bay Lightning (from Ottawa via Anaheim)^{3}	Spartak Moscow (Russia)
56	Dorian Anneck (C)	Canada	Winnipeg Jets	Victoria Cougars (WHL)
57	Sven Butenschon (D)	Germany	Pittsburgh Penguins (from Hartford)^{4}	Brandon Wheat Kings (WHL)
58	Tavis Hansen (RW)	Canada	Winnipeg Jets (from Edmonton)^{5}	Tacoma Rockets (WHL)
59	Vitali Yachmenev (RW)	Russia	Los Angeles Kings	North Bay Centennials (OHL)
60	Brad Symes (D)	Canada	Edmonton Oilers (from Tampa Bay)^{6}	Portland Winter Hawks (WHL)
61	Sebastien Bety (D)	Canada	Quebec Nordiques	Drummondville Voltigeurs (QMJHL)
62	Artem Anisimov (D)	Russia	Philadelphia Flyers	Itil Kazan (Russia)
63	Jason Strudwick (D)	Canada	New York Islanders (from San Jose)^{7}	Kamloops Blazers (WHL)
64	Fredrik Modin (LW)	Sweden	Toronto Maple Leafs (from NY Islanders)^{8}	Timra IK (Sweden)
65	Chad Allan (D)	Canada	Vancouver Canucks	Saskatoon Blades (WHL)
66	Alexei Yegorov (RW)	Russia	San Jose Sharks (from Chicago)^{9}	SKA Saint Petersburg (Russia)
67	Craig Reichert (RW)	Canada	Mighty Ducks of Anaheim (from Washington via Tampa Bay)^{10}	Red Deer Rebels (WHL)
68	Stephane Roy (C)	Canada	St. Louis Blues	Val-d'Or Foreurs (QMJHL)
69	Rumun Ndur (D)	Canada	Buffalo Sabres	Guelph Storm (OHL)
70	Marko Kiprusoff (D)	Finland	Montreal Canadiens	TPS (Finland)
71	Sheldon Souray (D)	Canada	New Jersey Devils (from Calgary)^{11}	Tri-City Americans (WHL)
72	Chris Drury (C)	United States	Quebec Nordiques (from Dallas)^{12}	Fairfield College Preparatory School (USHS–CT)
73	Greg Crozier (LW)	Canada	Pittsburgh Penguins (from Boston)^{13}	Lawrence Academy (USHS–MA)
74	Martin Belanger (D)	Canada	Montreal Canadiens (from Toronto)^{14}	Granby Bisons (QMJHL)
75	Sean Gillam (D)	Canada	Detroit Red Wings	Spokane Chiefs (WHL)
76	Alexei Krivchenkov (D)	Russia	Pittsburgh Penguins	CSKA Moscow (Russia)
77	Chris Clark (RW)	United States	Calgary Flames (from New Jersey)^{15}	Springfield Olympics (NEJHL)
78	Adam Smith (D)	Canada	New York Rangers	Tacoma Rockets (WHL)

Notes

1. The Florida Panthers' third-round pick went to the Edmonton Oilers as the result of a trade on December 6, 1993, that sent Geoff Smith and a fourth-round pick in 1994 (84th overall) to Florida in exchange for St. Louis's sixth-round pick in 1994 (146th overall) and this pick.
2. The Mighty Ducks of Anaheim's third-round pick went to the Montreal Canadiens as the result of a trade on August 10, 1993, that sent Todd Ewen and Patrik Carnback to Anaheim in exchange for this pick.
3. The Ottawa Senators' third-round pick went to the Tampa Bay Lightning as the result of a trade on June 29 that sent Washington's third-round pick in 1994 (67th overall) and a 1995 (82nd overall) to Anaheim in exchange for this pick.
  Anaheim previously acquired this pick as the result of a trade on June 28 that sent the Sean Hill and a ninth-round pick in 1994 (210th overall) to Ottawa in exchange for this pick.
4. The Hartford Whalers' third-round pick went to the Pittsburgh Penguins as the result of a trade on March 10, 1992, that sent Frank Pietrangelo to Hartford in exchange for a seventh-round pick in 1994 (161st overall) and this pick.
5. The Edmonton Oilers' third-round pick went to the Winnipeg Jets as the result of a trade on December 6, 1993, that sent Fredrik Olausson and a seventh-round pick in 1994 (160th overall) to Edmonton in exchange for this pick.
6. The Tampa Bay Lightning's third-round pick went to the Edmonton Oilers as the result of a trade on June 16, 1993, that sent Petr Klima to Tampa Bay in exchange for this pick.
7. The San Jose Sharks' third-round pick went to the New York Islanders as the result of a trade on June 20, 1993, that sent Jeff Norton to San Jose in exchange for future considerations and this pick.
8. The New York Islanders' third-round pick went to the Toronto Maple Leafs as the result of a trade on June 28 that sent a second-round pick in 1995 to New York in exchange for this pick.
9. The Chicago Blackhawks' third-round pick went to the San Jose Sharks as the result of a trade on July 13, 1993, that sent Jeff Hackett to Chicago in exchange for this pick.
10. The Washington Capitals' third-round pick went to the Mighty Ducks of Anaheim as the result of a trade on June 29 that sent Ottawa's third-round pick in 1994 (55th overall) to Tampa Bay in exchange for a fourth-round pick in 1995 and this pick.
  Tampa Bay previously acquired this pick as the result of a trade on March 21, 1994, that sent Joe Reekie to Washington in exchange for Enrico Ciccone, Tampa Bay's conditional fifth-round pick in 1995 and this pick.
11. The Calgary Flames' third-round pick went to the New Jersey Devils as the result of a trade on June 29 that sent a third-round pick, Vancouver's fourth-round pick and Ottawa's fifth-round pick all in 1994 (77th, 91st and 107th overall) to Calgary in exchange for this pick.
12. The Dallas Stars' third-round pick went to the Quebec Nordiques as the result of a trade on February 13, 1994, that sent the rights to Manny Fernandez to Dallas in exchange for Tommy Sjodin and this pick.
13. The Boston Bruins' third-round pick went to the Pittsburgh Penguins as the result of a trade on October 8, 1993, that sent Paul Stanton to Boston in exchange for this pick.
14. The Toronto Maple Leafs' third-round pick went to the Montreal Canadiens as the result of a trade on August 20, 1992, that sent Sylvain Lefebvre and future considerations to Toronto in exchange for this pick.
15. The New Jersey Devils' third-round pick went to the Calgary Flames as the result of a trade on June 29 that sent a third-round pick (71st overall) to New Jersey in exchange for Vancouver's fourth-round pick and Ottawa's fifth-round pick both in 1994 (91st and 107th overall) and this pick.

=== Round four ===
#	Player	Nationality	NHL team	College/junior/club team
79	Adam Copeland (RW)	Canada	Edmonton Oilers (from Florida via Winnipeg)^{1}	Burlington Cougars (OPJHL)
80	Byron Briske (D)	Canada	Mighty Ducks of Anaheim	Red Deer Rebels (WHL)
81	Bryan Masotta (G)	United States	Ottawa Senators	New Haven Academy (USHS–CT)
82	Steve Cheredaryk (D)	Canada	Winnipeg Jets	Medicine Hat Tigers (WHL)
83	Hnat Domenichelli (LW)	Canada	Hartford Whalers	Kamloops Blazers (WHL)
84	David Nemirovsky (RW)	Canada	Florida Panthers (from Edmonton)^{2}	Ottawa 67's (OHL)
85	Steve McLaren (LW)	Canada	Chicago Blackhawks (from Los Angeles)^{3}	North Bay Centennials (OHL)
86	Dmitri Klevakin (LW)	Russia	Tampa Bay Lightning (from Tampa Bay via St. Louis)^{4}	Spartak Moscow (Russia)
87	Milan Hejduk (RW)	Czech Republic	Quebec Nordiques	HC Pardubice (Czech Republic)
88	Adam Magarrell (D)	Canada	Philadelphia Flyers	Brandon Wheat Kings (WHL)
89	Vaclav Varada (RW)	Czech Republic	San Jose Sharks	HC Vitkovice (Czech Republic)
90	Brad Lukowich (D)	Canada	New York Islanders	Kamloops Blazers (WHL)
91	Ryan Duthie (C)	Canada	Calgary Flames (from Vancouver via Tampa Bay and New Jersey)^{5}	Spokane Chiefs (WHL)
92	Mike Dubinsky (RW)	Canada	Vancouver Canucks (from Chicago)^{6}	Brandon Wheat Kings (WHL)
93	Matt Herr (C)	United States	Washington Capitals	The Hotchkiss School (USHS–CT)
94	Tyler Harlton (D)	Canada	St. Louis Blues	Vernon Lakers (BCHL)
95	Jussi Tarvainen (C)	Finland	Edmonton Oilers (from Buffalo)^{7}	KalPa (Finland)
96	Arto Kuki (C)	Finland	Montreal Canadiens	Kiekko-Espoo (Finland)
97	Johan Finnstrom (D)	Sweden	Calgary Flames	Rogle BK (Sweden)
98	Jamie Wright (LW)	Canada	Dallas Stars	Guelph Storm (OHL)
99	Eric Nickulas (RW)	United States	Boston Bruins	Cushing Academy (USHS–MA)
100	Alexander Korobolin (D)	Russia	New York Rangers (from Toronto)^{8}	Traktor Chelyabinsk (Russia)
101	Sebastien Vallee (LW)	Canada	Philadelphia Flyers (from Detroit)^{9}	Victoriaville Tigres (QMJHL)
102	Tom O'Connor (D)	United States	Pittsburgh Penguins	Springfield Olympics (NEJHL)
103	Zdenek Skorepa (LW)	Czech Republic	New Jersey Devils	Chemopetrol Litvinov (Czech Republic)
104	Sylvain Blouin (LW)	Canada	New York Rangers	Laval Titan (QMJHL)

Notes

1. The Florida Panthers' fourth-round pick went to the Edmonton Oilers as the result of a trade on March 15, 1994, that sent Dave Manson and St. Louis's sixth-round pick in 1994 (146th overall) to Winnipeg in exchange for Boris Mironov, Mats Lindgren, a first-round pick in 1994 (4th overall) and this pick.
  Winnipeg previously acquired this pick as the result of a trade on September 30, 1993, that sent Evgeny Davydov and a conditional fourth-round pick in 1994 to Florida in exchange for this pick.
2. The Edmonton Oilers' fourth-round pick went to the Florida Panthers as the result of a trade on December 6, 1993, that sent a third-round pick and St. Louis's sixth-round pick (53rd and 146th overall) both in 1994 to Edmonton in exchange for Geoff Smith and this pick.
3. The Los Angeles Kings' fourth-round pick went to the Chicago Blackhawks as the result of a trade on March 21, 1994, that sent Kevin Todd to Los Angeles in exchange for this pick.
4. The Tampa Bay Lightning's fourth-round pick was re-acquired as the result of a trade on January 28, 1993, that sent Basil McRae, Doug Crossman and a fourth-round pick in 1996 to St. Louis in exchange for Jason Ruff, Tampa Bay's fifth-round pick in 1995, Tampa Bay's sixth-round pick in 1996 and this pick.
  St. Louis previously acquired this pick as the result of a trade on June 19, 1992, that sent Pat Jablonski, Darin Kimble, Rob Robinson and Steve Tuttle to Tampa Bay in exchange for a fifth-round pick in 1995, a sixth-round pick in 1996 and this pick.
5. The Vancouver Canucks' fourth-round pick went to the Calgary Flames as the result of a trade on June 29 that sent a third-round pick (71st overall) to New Jersey in exchange for a third-round pick and Ottawa's fifth-round pick both in 1994 (77th and 107th overall) and this pick.
  New Jersey previously acquired this pick as the result of a trade on May 31, 1994, that sent Jeff Toms to Tampa Bay in exchange for this pick.
  Tampa Bay previously acquired this pick as the result of a trade on November 3, 1992, that sent Anatoli Semenov to Vancouver in exchange for Dave Capuano and this pick.
6. The Chicago Blackhawks' fourth-round pick went to the Vancouver Canucks as the result of a trade on March 21, 1994, that sent Robert Dirk to Chicago in exchange for this pick.
7. The Buffalo Sabres' fourth-round pick went to the Edmonton Oilers as the result of a trade on September 1, 1993, that sent Craig Simpson to Buffalo in exchange for Jozef Cierny and this pick.
8. The Toronto Maple Leafs' fourth-round pick went to the New York Rangers as the result of a trade on March 21, 1994, that sent Mike Gartner to Toronto in exchange for Glenn Anderson, rights to Scott Malone and this pick.
9. The Detroit Red Wings' fourth-round pick went to the Philadelphia Flyers as the result of a trade on November 5, 1993, that sent Terry Carkner to Detroit in exchange for Yves Racine and this pick.

=== Round five ===
#	Player	Nationality	NHL team	College/junior/club team
105	David Geris (D)	Canada	Florida Panthers	Windsor Spitfires (OHL)
106	Pavel Trnka (D)	Czech Republic	Mighty Ducks of Anaheim	Skoda Plzen (Czech)
107	Nils Ekman (RW)	Sweden	Calgary Flames (from Ottawa via New Jersey)^{1}	Hammarby IF (Sweden)
108	Craig Mills (RW)	Canada	Winnipeg Jets	Belleville Bulls (OHL)
109	Ryan Risidore (D)	Canada	Hartford Whalers	Guelph Storm (OHL)
110	Jon Gaskins (D)	United States	Edmonton Oilers	Dubuque Fighting Saints (USHL)
111	Chris Schmidt (C)	Canada	Los Angeles Kings	Seattle Thunderbirds (WHL)
112	Mark McArthur (G)	Canada	New York Islanders (from Tampa Bay)^{2}	Guelph Storm (OHL)
113	Tony Tuzzolino (RW)	United States	Quebec Nordiques	Michigan State University (CCHA)
114	Frederic Deschenes (G)	Canada	Detroit Red Wings (from Philadelphia via Winnipeg and Philadelphia)^{3}	Granby Bisons (QMJHL)
115	Brian Swanson (C)	United States	San Jose Sharks	Omaha Lancers (USHL)
116	Albie O'Connell (LW)	United States	New York Islanders	Saint Sebastian's School (USHS–MA)
117	Yanick Dube (C)	Canada	Vancouver Canucks	Laval Titan (QMJHL)
118	Marc Dupuis (D)	Canada	Chicago Blackhawks	Belleville Bulls (OHL)
119	Yanick Jean (D)	Canada	Washington Capitals	Chicoutimi Sagueneens (QMJHL)
120	Edvin Frylen (D)	Sweden	St. Louis Blues	VIK Vasteras HK (Sweden)
121	Serhiy Klymentiev (D)	Ukraine	Buffalo Sabres	Medicine Hat Tigers (WHL)
122	Jimmy Drolet (D)	Canada	Montreal Canadiens	Saint-Hyacinthe Laser (QMJHL)
123	Frank Appel (D)	Germany	Calgary Flames	Düsseldorfer EGEG (Germany)
124	Marty Turco (G)	Canada	Dallas Stars	Cambridge Winterhawks (MWJHL)
125	Darren Wright (D)	Canada	Boston Bruins	Prince Albert Raiders (WHL)
126	Mark Deyell (C)	Canada	Toronto Maple Leafs	Saskatoon Blades (WHL)
127	Doug Battaglia (LW)	Canada	Detroit Red Wings	Brockville Braves (CJHL)
128	Clint Johnson (LW)	United States	Pittsburgh Penguins	Duluth East High School (USHS–MN)
129	Christian Gosselin (D)	Canada	New Jersey Devils	Saint-Hyacinthe Laser (QMJHL)
130	Martin Ethier (D)	Canada	New York Rangers	Beauport Harfangs (QMJHL)

1. New Jersey's fifth-round pick went to Calgary as the result of a trade on June 29, 1994, that sent Calgary's third-round pick (# 71 overall) in the 1994 Entry Draft to New Jersey in exchange for New Jersey's third-round (# 77 overall), fourth-round (# 91 Overall) picks in the 1994 Entry Draft and this pick.
  New Jersey previously acquired this pick as the result of a trade with Ottawa on June 20 that sent Peter Sidorkiewicz, future considerations (Mike Peluso on June 26, 1993) and a fifth-round pick in 1994 Entry Draft to New Jersey in exchange for Craig Billington, Troy Mallette and this pick.
2. Tampa Bay's fifth-round pick went to the Islanders as the result of a trade on October 5, 1992, that sent future considerations (Islanders agreed to leave Adam Creighton unprotected in the 1992 NHL Waiver Draft ) to the Islanders in exchange for this pick.
3. Philadelphia's fifth-round pick went to Detroit as the result of a trade on June 20, 1993, that sent Jim Cummings and Philadelphia's fifth-round pick in 1994 Entry Draft to Detroit in exchange for Greg Johnson and this pick.
  Philadelphia's fifth-round pick was re-acquired from Winnipeg as the result of a trade on June 11, 1993, that sent Stephane Beauregard to Winnipeg in exchange for a third-round pick in the 1993 entry draft and this pick.
  Philadelphia's fifth-round pick went to Winnipeg as the result of a trade on October 1, 1992, that sent Stephane Beauregard to Philadelphia in exchange a third-round pick in the 1993 entry draft and this pick.

=== Round six ===
#	Player	Nationality	NHL team	College/junior/club team
131	Mike Gaffney (D)	United States	Ottawa Senators (from Florida)^{1}	St. John's High School (HS-Massachusetts)
132	Bates Battaglia (LW)	United States	Mighty Ducks of Anaheim	Caledon Canadians (OHA-B)
133	Daniel Alfredsson (RW)	Sweden	Ottawa Senators	Vastra Frolunda HC (Sweden)
134	Ryan Smart (C)	United States	New Jersey Devils (from Winnipeg)^{2}	Meadville Area Senior High School (USHS–PA)
135	Yuri Litvinov (C)	Russia	New York Rangers (from Hartford)^{3}	Krylya Sovetov (Russia)
136	Terry Marchant (LW)	United States	Edmonton Oilers	Niagara Scenics (NAHL)
137	Dan Juden (C)	United States	Tampa Bay Lightning (from Los Angeles)^{4}	Governor Dummer Academy (USHS–MA)
138	Bryce Salvador (D)	Canada	Tampa Bay Lightning	Lethbridge Hurricanes (WHL)
139	Nicholas Windsor (D)	Canada	Quebec Nordiques	Cornwall Colts (COJHL)
140	Alexander Selivanov (RW)	Russia	Philadelphia Flyers	Spartak Moscow (Russia)
141	Alexander Korolyuk (LW)	Russia	San Jose Sharks	Krylya Sovetov (Russia)
142	Jason Stewart (C)	United States	New York Islanders	Simley High School (USHS–MA)
143	Steve Vezina (G)	Canada	Winnipeg Jets (from Vancouver)^{5}	Beauport Harfangs (QMJHL)
144	Jim Ensom (C)	Canada	Chicago Blackhawks	North Bay Centennials (OHL)
145	Dmitri Mekeshkin (D)	Russia	Washington Capitals	Avangard Omsk (Russia)
146	Chris Kibermanis (D)	Canada	Winnipeg Jets (from St. Louis via Winnipeg, Florida, and Edmonton)^{6}	Red Deer Rebels (MJHL)
147	Cal Benazic (D)	Canada	Buffalo Sabres	Medicine Hat Tigers (WHL)
148	Joel Irving (C)	Canada	Montreal Canadiens	Regina Pat Canadians (SMAAAHL)
149	Patrik Haltia (G)	Sweden	Calgary Flames	Farjestad BK (Sweden)
150	Evgeny Petrochinin (D)	Russia	Dallas Stars	Spartak Moscow (Russia)
151	Andre Roy (RW)	United States	Boston Bruins	Chicoutimi Sagueneens (QMJHL)
152	Kam White (D)	United States	Toronto Maple Leafs	Newmarket Royals (OHL)
153	Pavel Agarkov (RW)	Russia	Detroit Red Wings	Krylya Sovetov (Russia)
154	Valentin Morozov (C)	Russia	Pittsburgh Penguins	CSKA Moscow (Russia)
155	Luciano Caravaggio (G)	Canada	New Jersey Devils	Michigan Technical University (WCHA)
156	David Brosseau (C)	Canada	New York Rangers	Shawinigan Cataractes (QMJHL)

1. Florida's sixth-round pick went to Ottawa as the result of a trade on January 6, 1994, that sent Bob Kudelski to Florida in exchange for Evgeny Davydov, Scott Levins, a fourth-round pick in the 1995 entry draft and this pick.
2. Winnipeg's sixth-round pick went to New Jersey as the result of a trade on September 30, 1993, that sent Brent Severyn to Winnipeg in exchange for this pick.
3. Hartford's sixth-round pick went to the Rangers as the result of a trade on November 2, 1993, that sent James Patrick and Darren Turcotte to Hartford in exchange for Nick Kypreos, Steve Larmer, Barry Richter and this pick.
4. Los Angeles' sixth-round pick went to Tampa Bay as the result of a trade on March 19, 1994, that sent Donald Dufresne to Los Angeles in exchange for this pick.
5. Vancouver's sixth-round pick went to Winnipeg as the result of a trade on June 29, 1994, that sent Artur Oktyabrev to Vancouver in exchange for this pick.
6. Winnipeg's sixth-round pick was re-acquired as the result of a trade with Edmonton on March 15, 1994, that sent Mats Lindgren, Boris Mironov, a first-round and fourth-round picks in the 1994 Entry Draft to Edmonton in exchange for Dave Manson and this pick.
  Florida's sixth-round pick went to Edmonton as the result of a trade on December 6, 1993, that sent Geoff Smith and a fourth-round pick in the 1994 Entry Draft to Florida in exchange for a third-round picks in the 1994 Entry Draft and this pick.
  Winnipeg's sixth-round pick went to Florida as the result of a trade on November 25, 1993, that sent Randy Gilhen to Winnipeg in exchange for Stu Barnes and this pick.
  St. Louis' sixth-round pick went to Winnipeg as the result of a trade on July 19, 1993, that sent Jim Hrivnak to St. Louis in exchange for this pick.

=== Round seven ===
#	Player	Nationality	NHL team	College/junior/club team
157	Matt O'Dette (RW)	Canada	Florida Panthers	Kitchener Rangers (OHL)
158	Rocky Welsing (D)	United States	Mighty Ducks of Anaheim	Wisconsin Capitols (USHL)
159	Doug Sproule (LW)	United States	Ottawa Senators	The Hotchkiss School (USHS–CT)
160	Curtis Sheptak (LW)	Canada	Edmonton Oilers (from Winnipeg)^{1}	Olds Grizzlys (AJHL)
161	Serge Aubin (C)	Canada	Pittsburgh Penguins (from Hartford)^{2}	Granby Bisons (QMJHL)
162	Dmitri Sulga (RW)	Russia	Edmonton Oilers	Tivali Minsk (Belarus)
163	Luc Gagne (RW)	Canada	Los Angeles Kings	Sudbury Wolves (OHL)
164	Chris Maillet (D)	Canada	Tampa Bay Lightning	Red Deer Rebels (WHL)
165	Calvin Elfring (D)	Canada	Quebec Nordiques	Powell River Paper Kings (BCHL)
166	Colin Forbes (LW)	Canada	Philadelphia Flyers	Portland Winter Hawks (WHL)
167	Sergei Gorbachev (RW)	Russia	San Jose Sharks	Dynamo Moscow (Russia)
168	Steve Plouffe (G)	Canada	Buffalo Sabres (from NY Islanders)^{3}	Granby Bisons (QMJHL)
169	Yuri Kuznetsov (C)	Russia	Vancouver Canucks	Avangard Omsk (Russia)
170	Tyler Prosofsky (C)	Canada	Chicago Blackhawks	Tacoma Rockets (WHL)
171	Dan Reja (C)	Canada	Washington Capitals	London Knights (OHL)
172	Roman Vopat (LW)	Czech Republic	St. Louis Blues	Chemopetrol Litvinov (Czech Republic)
173	Shane Hnidy (D)	Canada	Buffalo Sabres	Prince Albert Raiders (WHL)
174	Jesse Rezansoff (RW)	Canada	Montreal Canadiens	Regina Pats (WHL)
175	Ladislav Kohn (RW)	Czech Republic	Calgary Flames	Swift Current Broncos (WHL)
176	Steve Webb (RW)	Canada	Buffalo Sabres (from Dallas)^{4}	Peterborough Petes (OHL)
177	Jeremy Schaefer (LW)	Canada	Boston Bruins	Medicine Hat Tigers (WHL)
178	Tommi Rajamaki (D)	Finland	Toronto Maple Leafs	Assat (Finland)
179	Chris Wickenheiser (G)	Canada	Edmonton Oilers (from Detroit)^{5}	Red Deer Rebels (WHL)
180	Drew Palmer (D)	United States	Pittsburgh Penguins	Seattle Thunderbirds (WHL)
181	Jeff Williams (C)	Canada	New Jersey Devils	Guelph Storm (OHL)
182	Olexei Lazarenko (RW)	Ukraine	New York Rangers	CSKA Moscow (Russia)

1. Winnipeg's seventh-round pick went to Edmonton as the result of a trade on December 6, 1993, that sent Edmonton's third-round pick in the 1994 Entry Draft to Winnipeg in exchange for Fredrik Olausson and this pick.
2. Hartford's seventh-round pick went to Pittsburgh as the result of a trade on March 10, 1992, that sent Frank Pietrangelo to Hartford in exchange for a third-round pick in the 1994 Entry Draft and this pick.
3. The Islanders' seventh-round pick went to Buffalo as the result of a trade on September 30, 1993, that sent Tom Draper to the Islanders in exchange for this pick.
4. Dallas' seventh-round pick went to Buffalo as the result of a trade on December 15, 1993, that sent Gord Donnelly to Dallas in exchange for James Black and this pick.
5. Detroit's seventh-round pick went to Edmonton as the result of a trade on August 30, 1993, that sent Peter Ing to Detroit in exchange for future considerations and this pick.

=== Round eight ===
#	Player	Nationality	NHL team	College/junior/club team
183	Jason Boudrias (C)	Canada	Florida Panthers	Laval Titan (QMJHL)
184	Brad Englehart (LW)	Canada	Mighty Ducks of Anaheim	Kimball Union Academy (USHS–NH)
185	Rob Guinn (D)	Canada	Edmonton Oilers (from Ottawa)^{1}	Newmarket Royals (OHL)
186	Ramil Saifullin (C)	Russia	Winnipeg Jets	Avangard Omsk (Russia)
187	Tom Buckley (C)	United States	Hartford Whalers	St. Joseph's High School (USHS–New York)
188	Jason Reid (D)	Canada	Edmonton Oilers	St. Andrew's College (HS–Ontario)
189	Andrew Dale (C)	Canada	Los Angeles Kings	Sudbury Wolves (OHL)
190	Alexei Baranov (D)	Russia	Tampa Bay Lightning	Dynamo Moscow (Russia)
191	Jay Bertsch (RW)	Canada	Quebec Nordiques	Spokane Chiefs (WHL)
192	Derek Diener (D)	Canada	Philadelphia Flyers	Lethbridge Hurricanes (WHL)
193	Eric Landry (RW)	Canada	San Jose Sharks	Guelph Storm (OHL)
194	Mike Loach (C)	Canada	New York Islanders	Windsor Spitfires (OHL)
195	Rob Trumbley (C)	Canada	Vancouver Canucks	Moose Jaw Warriors (WHL)
196	Mike Josephson (LW)	Canada	Chicago Blackhawks	Kamloops Blazers (WHL)
197	Juraj Jenčo (C)	Slovakia	Hartford Whalers	HK 36 Skalica (Slovakia)
198	Steve Noble (C)	Canada	St. Louis Blues	Stratford Cullitons (MOJHL)
199	Bob Westerby (LW)	Canada	Buffalo Sabres	Kamloops Blazers (WHL)
200	Peter Strom (LW)	Sweden	Montreal Canadiens	Vastra Frolunda HC (Sweden)
201	Keith McCambridge (D)	Canada	Calgary Flames	Swift Current Broncos (WHL)
202	Raymond Giroux (D)	Canada	Philadelphia Flyers (from Dallas)^{2}	Powassan Hawks (MWJHL)
203	Peter Hogardh (C)	Sweden	New York Islanders (from Boston)^{3}	Vastra Frolunda HC (Sweden)
204	Rob Butler (LW)	Canada	Toronto Maple Leafs	Niagara Falls Canucks (GHJHL)
205	Jason Elliott (G)	Canada	Detroit Red Wings	Cornell University (ECAC)
206	Boris Zelenko (LW)	Russia	Pittsburgh Penguins	CSKA Moscow (Russia)
207	Eric Bertrand (LW)	Canada	New Jersey Devils	Granby Bisons (QMJHL)
208	Craig Anderson (D)	United States	New York Rangers	Park (C) High School (USHS–MN)

1. Ottawa's eighth-round pick went to Edmonton as the result of a trade on September 15, 1993, that sent Brian Glynn to Ottawa in exchange for this pick.
2. Dallas' eighth-round pick went to Philadelphia as the result of a trade on March 21, 1994, that sent Pelle Eklund to Dallas in exchange for this pick.
3. Boston's eighth-round pick went to the Islanders as the result of a trade on March 18, 1993, that sent Daniel Marois to Boston in exchange for a conditional draft pick in the 1994 Entry Draft (this pick). Conditions of this draft pick are unknown.

=== Round nine ===
#	Player	Nationality	NHL team	College/junior/club team
209	Vitali Yeremeyev (G)	Kazakhstan	New York Rangers (from Florida)^{1}	Torpedo Ust-Kamenogorsk (Kazakhstan)
210	Frederic Cassivi (G)	Canada	Ottawa Senators (from Anaheim)^{2}	Saint-Hyacinthe Lasers (QMJHL)
211	Danny Dupont (D)	Canada	Ottawa Senators	Laval Titan (QMJHL)
212	Henrik Smangs (G)	Sweden	Winnipeg Jets	Leksands IF (Sweden)
213	Ashlin Halfnight (D)	Canada	Hartford Whalers	Harvard University (ECAC)
214	Jeremy Jablonski (G)	Canada	Edmonton Oilers	Victoria Cougars (WHL)
215	Jan Nemecek (D)	Czech Republic	Los Angeles Kings	HC Ceske Budejovice (Czech Republic)
216	Yuri Smirnov (C)	Russia	Tampa Bay Lightning	Spartak Moscow (Russia)
217	Tim Thomas (G)	United States	Quebec Nordiques	University of Vermont (Hockey East)
218	Johan Hedberg (G)	Sweden	Philadelphia Flyers	Leksands IF (Sweden)
219	Evgeni Nabokov (G)	Kazakhstan	San Jose Sharks	Torpedo Ust-Kamenogorsk (Kazakhstan)
220	Gord Walsh (LW)	Canada	New York Islanders	Kingston Frontenacs (OHL)
221	Bill Muckalt (RW)	Canada	Vancouver Canucks	Kelowna Spartans (BCHL)
222	Lubomir Jandera (D)	Czech Republic	Chicago Blackhawks	Chemopetrol Litvinov (Czech)
223	John Tuohy (D)	United States	Washington Capitals	South Kent School (USHS–CT)
224	Marc Stephan (C)	Canada	St. Louis Blues	Tri-City Americans (WHL)
225	Craig Millar (D)	Canada	Buffalo Sabres	Swift Current Broncos (WHL)
226	Tomas Vokoun (G)	Czech Republic	Montreal Canadiens	Poldi Kladno (Czech Republic)
227	Jorgen Jonsson (C)	Sweden	Calgary Flames	Rogle BK (Sweden)
228	Marty Flichel (RW)	Canada	Dallas Stars	Tacoma Rockets (WHL)
229	John Grahame (G)	United States	Boston Bruins	Lake Superior State University (CCHA)
230	Matt Ball (RW)	Canada	Hartford Whalers (from Toronto)^{3}	Detroit Junior Red Wings (OHL)
231	Jeff Mikesch (C)	United States	Detroit Red Wings	Michigan Technological University (WCHA)
232	Jason Godbout (D)	United States	Pittsburgh Penguins	Hill-Murray School (USHS–MN)
233	Steve Sullivan (LW)	Canada	New Jersey Devils	Sault Ste. Marie Greyhounds (OHL)
234	Eric Boulton (LW)	Canada	New York Rangers	Oshawa Generals (OHL)

1. Florida's ninth-round pick went to the Rangers as the result of a trade on March 21, 1994, that sent Peter Andersson to Florida in exchange for this pick.
2. Anaheim's ninth-round pick went to Ottawa as the result of a trade on June 28, 1994, that sent a third-round pick in the 1994 Entry Draft to Anaheim in exchange for Sean Hill and this pick.
3. Toronto's ninth-round pick went to Hartford as the result of a trade on March 18, 1994, that sent Ken Belanger to Toronto in exchange for this pick.

=== Round ten ===
#	Player	Nationality	NHL team	College/junior/club team
235	Tero Lehtera (LW)	Finland	Florida Panthers	Kiekko-Espoo (Finland)
236	Tommi Miettinen (C)	Finland	Mighty Ducks of Anaheim	KalPa (Finland)
237	Steve MacKinnon (D)	United States	Ottawa Senators	Cushing Academy (USHS–MA)
238	Mike Mader (RW)	United States	Winnipeg Jets	Loomis Chaffee School (USHS–MA)
239	Brian Regan (G)	United States	Hartford Whalers	Westminster School (USHS–CT)
240	Tomas Pisa (RW)	Czech Republic	San Jose Sharks (from Edmonton)^{1}	HC Pardubice (Czech Republic)
241	Sergei Shalamai (LW)	Russia	Los Angeles Kings	HC Irkutsk (Russia)
242	Shawn Gervais (C)	Canada	Tampa Bay Lightning	Seattle Thunderbirds (WHL)
243	Chris Pittman (C)	Canada	Quebec Nordiques	Kitchener Rangers (OHL)
244	Andre Payette (C)	Canada	Philadelphia Flyers	Sault Ste. Marie Greyhounds (OHL)
245	Aniket Dhadphale (LW)	United States	San Jose Sharks	Marquette Electricians (MAAAMHL)
246	Kirk DeWaele (D)	Canada	New York Islanders	Lethbridge Hurricanes (WHL)
247	Tyson Nash (LW)	Canada	Vancouver Canucks	Kamloops Blazers (WHL)
248	Lars Weibel (G)	Switzerland	Chicago Blackhawks	HC Lugano (Switzerland)
249	Richard Zednik (RW)	Slovakia	Washington Capitals	Banska Bystrica (Slovakia)
250	Kevin Harper (D)	Canada	St. Louis Blues	Wexford Raiders (OJHL)
251	Mark Polak (C)	Canada	Buffalo Sabres	Medicine Hat Tigers (WHL)
252	Chris Aldous (D)	United States	Montreal Canadiens	Northwood Prep (USHS–NY)
253	Mike Peluso (RW)	United States	Calgary Flames	Omaha Lancers (USHL)
254	Jimmy Roy (C)	Canada	Dallas Stars	Thunder Bay Flyers (USHL)
255	Neil Savary (G)	Canada	Boston Bruins	Hull Olympiques (QMJHL)
256	Sergei Berezin (LW)	Russia	Toronto Maple Leafs	Khimik Voskresensk (Russia)
257	Tomas Holmstrom (LW)	Sweden	Detroit Red Wings	Bodens BK (Sweden)
258	Mikhail Kazakevich (C)	Russia	Pittsburgh Penguins	Torpedo Yaroslavl (Russia)
259	Scott Swanjord (G)	United States	New Jersey Devils	Waterloo Black Hawks (USHL)
260	Radoslav Kropac (RW)	Slovakia	New York Rangers	Slovan Bratislava (Slovakia)

1. Edmonton's tenth-round pick went to San Jose as the result of a trade on September 10, 1993, that sent Link Gaetz to Edmonton in exchange for this pick.

=== Round eleven ===
#	Player	Nationality	NHL team	College/junior/club team
261	Per Gustafsson (D)	Sweden	Florida Panthers	HV71 (Sweden)
262	Jeremy Stevenson (LW)	United States	Mighty Ducks of Anaheim	Sault Ste. Marie Greyhounds (OHL)
263	Rob Mara (RW)	United States	Chicago Blackhawks (from Ottawa)^{1}	Belmont Hill High School (USHS–MA)
264	Jason Issel (LW)	Canada	Winnipeg Jets	Prince Albert Raiders (WHL)
265	Steve Nimigon (LW)	Canada	Hartford Whalers	Niagara Falls Thunder (OHL)
266	Ladislav Benysek (D)	Czech Republic	Edmonton Oilers	HC Olomouc (Czech Republic)
267	Jamie Butt (LW)	Canada	New York Rangers (from Los Angeles)^{2}	Tacoma Rockets (WHL)
268	Brian White (D)	United States	Tampa Bay Lightning	Arlington Catholic High School (USHS–MA)
269	Mike Hanson (C)	United States	New Jersey Devils (from Quebec)^{3}	Minot High School (USHS–ND)
270	Jan Lipiansky (LW)	Slovakia	Philadelphia Flyers	Slovan Bratislava (Slovakia)
271	David Beauregard (LW)	Canada	San Jose Sharks	Saint-Hyacinthe Lasers (QMJHL)
272	Dick Tarnstrom (D)	Sweden	New York Islanders	AIK IF (Sweden)
273	Robert Longpre (C)	Canada	Vancouver Canucks	Medicine Hat Tigers (WHL)
274	Antti Tormanen (RW)	Finland	Ottawa Senators (from Chicago)^{4}	Jokerit (Finland)
275	Sergei Tertyshny (D)	Russia	Washington Capitals	Traktor Chelyabinsk (Russia)
276	Scott Fankhouser (G)	United States	St. Louis Blues	University of Massachusetts Lowell (Hockey East)
277	Shayne Wright (D)	Canada	Buffalo Sabres	Owen Sound Platers (OHL)
278	Ross Parsons (D)	Canada	Montreal Canadiens	Regina Pats (WHL)
279	Pavel Torgayev (C)	Russia	Calgary Flames	TPS (Finland)
280	Chris Szysky (RW)	Canada	Dallas Stars	Swift Current Broncos (WHL)
281	Andrei Yakhanov (D)	Russia	Boston Bruins	Salavat Yulaev Ufa (Russia)
282	Doug Nolan (LW)	United States	Toronto Maple Leafs	Catholic Memorial High School (USHS–MA)
283	Toivo Suursoo (RW)	Estonia	Detroit Red Wings	Krylya Sovetov (Russia)
284	Brian Leitza (G)	United States	Pittsburgh Penguins	Sioux City Musketeers (USHL)
285	Steven Low (D)	Canada	Quebec Nordiques (from New Jersey)^{5}	Sherbrooke Faucons (QMJHL)
286	Kim Johnsson (D)	Sweden	New York Rangers	Malmo IF (Sweden)

1. Ottawa's eleventh-round pick went to Chicago as the result of a trade on March 11, 1994, that sent Troy Murray and an eleventh-round pick in the 1994 Entry Draft to Ottawa in exchange for this pick.
2. Los Angeles' eleventh-round pick went to the Rangers as the result of a trade on January 28, 1994, that sent Brad Tiley to Los Angeles in exchange for this pick.
3. Quebec's eleventh-round pick went to New Jersey as the result of a trade on June 3, 1994, that sent Stephane Yelle and an eleventh-round pick in the 1994 Entry Draft to Quebec in exchange for this pick.
4. Chicago's eleventh-round pick went to Ottawa as the result of a trade on March 11, 1994, that sent an eleventh-round pick in the 1994 Entry Draft to Chicago in exchange for Troy Murray and this pick.
5. New Jersey's eleventh-round pick went to Quebec as the result of a trade on June 3, 1994, that sent an eleventh-round pick in the 1994 Entry Draft to New Jersey in exchange for Stephane Yelle and this pick.

== Draftees based on nationality ==
Rank	Country	Number	Percent
	North America	201	70.1%
1	Canada	152	52.7%
2	United States	49	17.1%
	Europe	85	29.9%
3	Russia	34	11.9%
4	Sweden	17	5.9%
5	Czech Republic	15	5.2%
6	Finland	7	2.4%
7	Slovakia	4	1.4%
8	Ukraine	2	0.6%
8	Germany	2	0.6%
8	Kazakhstan	2	0.6%
11	Switzerland	1	0.3%
11	Estonia	1	0.3%

== See also ==
- 1994 NHL supplemental draft
- 1994–95 NHL season
- List of NHL players
