= 2000–01 Columbus Blue Jackets season =

National Hockey League season

2000–01 Columbus Blue Jackets
- Division: 5th Central
- Conference: 13th Western
- 2000–01 record: 28–39–9–6
- Home record: 19–15–4–3
- Road record: 9–24–5–3
- Goals for: 190
- Goals against: 233

Team information
- General manager: Doug MacLean
- Coach: Dave King
- Captain: Lyle Odelein
- Alternate captains: Geoff Sanderson; Tyler Wright
- Arena: Nationwide Arena
- Average attendance: 17,457
- Minor league affiliates: Syracuse Crunch (AHL); Dayton Bombers (ECHL); Elmira Jackals (UHL)

Team leaders
- Goals: Geoff Sanderson (30)
- Assists: Espen Knutsen (42)
- Points: Geoff Sanderson (56)
- Penalty minutes: Tyler Wright (140)
- Plus/minus: Jamie Pushor (+7)
- Wins: Ron Tugnutt (22)
- Goals against average: Ron Tugnutt (2.44)

The 2000–01 Columbus Blue Jackets season was the Blue Jackets' first season in the National Hockey League (NHL) after the city of Columbus, Ohio, was awarded an expansion team in 1997. The Blue Jackets finished 13th in the Conference and fifth in the Division. Thus, they were unable to qualify for the 2001 Stanley Cup playoffs.

== Off-season ==
The team would be named the Blue Jackets, as it was chosen to celebrate "patriotism, pride and the rich Civil War history in the state of Ohio and the city of Columbus". The Jackets would join the Central Division in the Western Conference.

The club would name Doug MacLean as general manager. MacLean had previously been the head coach of the Florida Panthers, leading the team to the Stanley Cup Finals in 1996. MacLean hired Dave King as the head coach of the Jackets. King had previously been the head coach of the Calgary Flames from 1992 to 1995, and was an assistant on the Montreal Canadiens from 1997 to 1999.

On June 23, 2000, the Blue Jackets and their expansion cousins, the Minnesota Wild, participated in the 2000 NHL expansion draft in Calgary. Columbus selected goaltender Rick Tabaracci with their first pick. The following day on June 24, Columbus would participate in the 2000 NHL entry draft, and selected Rostislav Klesla with the fourth overall pick.

Defenseman Lyle Odelein was named the team's first captain.

== Regular season ==
On October 7, 2000, Columbus would play in their first game ever, losing 5–3 to the Chicago Blackhawks at Nationwide Arena. Bruce Gardiner scored the first goal in franchise history. On October 14, the Blue Jackets became part of hockey history. In a loss against the Colorado Avalanche, goaltender Patrick Roy tied Terry Sawchuk for most career wins by a goaltender. The Blue Jackets would win their first ever game on October 12, defeating the Calgary Flames 3–2 at the Pengrowth Saddledome. Columbus would win its first home game on October 27, defeating the visiting Washington Capitals 3–1.

The Blue Jackets, like most expansion teams, would struggle throughout the season, and would finish the year 11 games under .500, with a 28–39–9–6 record, earning 71 points, 19 points behind the Vancouver Canucks for the final playoff spot in the Western Conference.

Geoff Sanderson would lead the Jackets with 30 goals and 56 points, while Espen Knutsen would lead Columbus with 44 assists. Steve Heinze was having a solid season, scoring 22 goals and 42 points, before being dealt to the Buffalo Sabres at the trade deadline. Jamie Heward led the blue line, scoring 11 goals and 27 points, while Deron Quint would score 7 goals and 23 points. Tyler Wright led the club with 140 penalty minutes.

Ron Tugnutt would get the majority of action in the Blue Jackets net, playing in 53 games, and tying a career high with 22 wins. Tugnutt would record a 2.44 goals against average (GAA), .917 save percentage and four shutouts. Marc Denis backed up Tugnutt, winning six games and recording a 3.25 GAA.

=== Season standings ===
Central Division
No.	CR		GP	W	L	T	OTL	GF	GA	Pts
1	2	**Detroit Red Wings**	82	49	20	9	4	253	202	111
2	4	**St. Louis Blues**	82	43	22	12	5	249	195	103
3	10	Nashville Predators	82	34	36	9	3	186	200	80
4	12	Chicago Blackhawks	82	29	40	8	5	210	246	71
5	13	Columbus Blue Jackets	82	28	39	9	6	190	233	71

Note: CR = Conference rank; GP = Games played; W = Wins; L = Losses; T = Ties; OTL = Overtime loss; GF = Goals for; GA = Goals against; Pts = Points
Bolded teams qualified for the playoffs.

Western Conference
R		Div	GP	W	L	T	OTL	GF	GA	Pts
**1**	**p – Colorado Avalanche**	**NW**	**82**	**52**	**16**	**10**	**4**	**270**	**192**	**118**
**2**	**y – Detroit Red Wings**	**CEN**	**82**	**49**	**20**	**9**	**4**	**253**	**202**	**111**
**3**	**y – Dallas Stars**	**PAC**	**82**	**48**	**24**	**8**	**2**	**241**	**187**	**106**
**4**	**St. Louis Blues**	**CEN**	**82**	**43**	**22**	**12**	**5**	**249**	**195**	**103**
**5**	**San Jose Sharks**	**PAC**	**82**	**40**	**27**	**12**	**3**	**217**	**192**	**95**
**6**	**Edmonton Oilers**	**NW**	**82**	**39**	**28**	**12**	**3**	**243**	**222**	**93**
**7**	**Los Angeles Kings**	**PAC**	**82**	**38**	**28**	**13**	**3**	**252**	**228**	**92**
**8**	**Vancouver Canucks**	**NW**	**82**	**36**	**28**	**11**	**7**	**239**	**238**	**90**
8.5
9	Phoenix Coyotes	PAC	82	35	27	17	3	214	212	90
10	Nashville Predators	CEN	82	34	36	9	3	186	200	80
11	Calgary Flames	NW	82	27	36	15	4	197	236	73
12	Chicago Blackhawks	CEN	82	29	40	8	5	210	246	71
13	Columbus Blue Jackets	CEN	82	28	39	9	6	190	233	71
14	Minnesota Wild	NW	82	25	39	13	5	168	210	68
15	Mighty Ducks of Anaheim	PAC	82	25	41	11	5	188	245	66

Divisions: CEN – Central, PAC – Pacific, NW – Northwest

bold – Qualified for playoffs; p – Won Presidents' Trophy; y – Won division

== Schedule and results ==
2000–01 regular season
October: 3–8–0–1 (home: 2–4–0–1; road: 1–4–0–0)

Game	Date	Visitor	Score	Home	Record	Pts	Recap
1	October 7	Chicago Blackhawks	5–3	Columbus Blue Jackets	0–1–0–0	0	L
2	October 9	Los Angeles Kings	7–1	Columbus Blue Jackets	0–2–0–0	0	L
3	October 12	Columbus Blue Jackets	3–2	Calgary Flames	1–2–0–0	2	W
4	October 14	Columbus Blue Jackets	1–3	Colorado Avalanche	1–3–0–0	2	L
5	October 15	Columbus Blue Jackets	1–2	Chicago Blackhawks	1–4–0–0	2	L
6	October 18	Colorado Avalanche	5–1	Columbus Blue Jackets	1–5–0–0	2	L
7	October 21	Columbus Blue Jackets	2–5	Pittsburgh Penguins	1–6–0–0	2	L
8	October 22	Detroit Red Wings	2–1	Columbus Blue Jackets	1–6–0–1	3	OTL
9	October 25	San Jose Sharks	3–1	Columbus Blue Jackets	1–7–0–1	3	L
10	October 27	Washington Capitals	1–3	Columbus Blue Jackets	2–7–0–1	5	W
11	October 28	Columbus Blue Jackets	1–4	Detroit Red Wings	2–8–0–1	5	L
12	October 31	Los Angeles Kings	1–4	Columbus Blue Jackets	3–8–0–1	7	W

November: 4–8–1–0 (home: 3–5–0–0; road: 1–3–1–0)

Game	Date	Visitor	Score	Home	Record	Pts	Recap
13	November 1	Columbus Blue Jackets	0–4	Dallas Stars	3–9–0–1	7	L
14	November 4	Columbus Blue Jackets	2–2	Ottawa Senators	3–9–1–1	8	T
15	November 5	Edmonton Oilers	4–2	Columbus Blue Jackets	3–10–1–1	8	L
16	November 9	San Jose Sharks	2–5	Columbus Blue Jackets	4–10–1–1	10	W
17	November 11	Phoenix Coyotes	1–2	Columbus Blue Jackets	5–10–1–1	12	W
18	November 14	Dallas Stars	2–3	Columbus Blue Jackets	6–10–1–1	14	W
19	November 16	Columbus Blue Jackets	5–1	Nashville Predators	7–10–1–1	16	W
20	November 17	Florida Panthers	3–0	Columbus Blue Jackets	7–11–1–1	16	L
21	November 19	Vancouver Canucks	6–1	Columbus Blue Jackets	7–12–1–1	16	L
22	November 21	Columbus Blue Jackets	2–5	Colorado Avalanche	7–13–1–1	16	L
23	November 24	Columbus Blue Jackets	0–3	Dallas Stars	7–14–1–1	16	L
24	November 25	Dallas Stars	4–2	Columbus Blue Jackets	7–15–1–1	16	L
25	November 29	Philadelphia Flyers	4–3	Columbus Blue Jackets	7–16–1–1	16	L

December: 5–6–3–1 (home: 3–2–1–0; road: 2–4–2–1)

Game	Date	Visitor	Score	Home	Record	Pts	Recap
26	December 2	Atlanta Thrashers	2–1	Columbus Blue Jackets	7–17–1–1	16	L
27	December 3	Columbus Blue Jackets	0–5	Chicago Blackhawks	7–18–1–1	16	L
28	December 6	Mighty Ducks of Anaheim	2–5	Columbus Blue Jackets	8–18–1–1	18	W
29	December 8	Boston Bruins	2–3	Columbus Blue Jackets	9–18–1–1	20	W
30	December 10	Columbus Blue Jackets	1–1	Phoenix Coyotes	9–18–2–1	21	T
31	December 13	Columbus Blue Jackets	3–4	Mighty Ducks of Anaheim	9–18–2–2	22	OTL
32	December 14	Columbus Blue Jackets	1–2	San Jose Sharks	9–19–2–2	22	L
33	December 16	Columbus Blue Jackets	3–4	Vancouver Canucks	9–20–2–2	22	L
34	December 18	Columbus Blue Jackets	2–0	Montreal Canadiens	10–20–2–2	24	W
35	December 21	Ottawa Senators	3–3	Columbus Blue Jackets	10–20–3–2	25	T
36	December 23	Columbus Blue Jackets	7–5	New York Islanders	11–20–3–2	27	W
37	December 26	Columbus Blue Jackets	0–5	St. Louis Blues	11–21–3–2	27	L
38	December 27	Columbus Blue Jackets	2–2	New Jersey Devils	11–21–4–2	28	T
39	December 29	Carolina Hurricanes	1–3	Columbus Blue Jackets	12–21–4–2	30	W
40	December 31	New Jersey Devils	6–3	Columbus Blue Jackets	12–22–4–2	30	L

January: 5–4–0–2 (home: 4–2–0–1; road: 1–2–0–1)

Game	Date	Visitor	Score	Home	Record	Pts	Recap
41	January 3	Edmonton Oilers	2–5	Columbus Blue Jackets	13–22–4–2	32	W
42	January 6	Columbus Blue Jackets	3–4	Vancouver Canucks	13–23–4–2	32	L
43	January 7	Columbus Blue Jackets	2–4	Edmonton Oilers	13–24–4–2	32	L
44	January 10	Colorado Avalanche	4–2	Columbus Blue Jackets	13–25–4–2	32	L
45	January 12	Chicago Blackhawks	3–1	Columbus Blue Jackets	13–26–4–2	32	L
46	January 15	Minnesota Wild	0–3	Columbus Blue Jackets	14–26–4–2	34	W
47	January 17	Columbus Blue Jackets	2–3	Minnesota Wild	14–26–4–3	35	OTL
48	January 21	Tampa Bay Lightning	1–3	Columbus Blue Jackets	15–26–4–3	37	W
49	January 23	Columbus Blue Jackets	2–1	Buffalo Sabres	16–26–4–3	39	W
50	January 27	Mighty Ducks of Anaheim	1–2	Columbus Blue Jackets	17–26–4–3	41	W
51	January 31	Detroit Red Wings	3–2	Columbus Blue Jackets	17–26–4–4	42	OTL

February: 3–5–3–2 (home: 2–1–1–1; road: 1–4–2–1)

Game	Date	Visitor	Score	Home	Record	Pts	Recap
52	February 1	Columbus Blue Jackets	2–2	St. Louis Blues	17–26–5–4	43	T
53	February 6	St. Louis Blues	2–2	Columbus Blue Jackets	17–26–6–4	44	T
54	February 8	Columbus Blue Jackets	1–3	Nashville Predators	17–27–6–4	44	L
55	February 10	Nashville Predators	2–3	Columbus Blue Jackets	18–27–6–4	46	W
56	February 12	New York Rangers	4–3	Columbus Blue Jackets	18–28–6–4	46	L
57	February 14	Columbus Blue Jackets	2–2	Toronto Maple Leafs	18–28–7–4	47	T
58	February 16	Columbus Blue Jackets	2–4	Detroit Red Wings	18–29–7–4	47	L
59	February 17	Pittsburgh Penguins	3–2	Columbus Blue Jackets	18–29–7–5	48	OTL
60	February 20	Columbus Blue Jackets	2–3	San Jose Sharks	18–29–7–6	49	OTL
61	February 21	Columbus Blue Jackets	2–3	Phoenix Coyotes	18–30–7–6	49	L
62	February 24	Columbus Blue Jackets	1–3	Los Angeles Kings	18–31–7–6	49	L
63	February 25	Columbus Blue Jackets	5–2	Mighty Ducks of Anaheim	19–31–7–6	51	W
64	February 28	Phoenix Coyotes	2–5	Columbus Blue Jackets	20–31–7–6	53	W

March: 5–6–2–0 (home: 2–1–2–0; road: 3–5–0–0)

Game	Date	Visitor	Score	Home	Record	Pts	Recap
65	March 1	Columbus Blue Jackets	5–2	Nashville Predators	21–31–7–6	55	W
66	March 7	Columbus Blue Jackets	1–2	Carolina Hurricanes	21–32–7–6	55	L
67	March 9	Columbus Blue Jackets	7–6	Florida Panthers	22–32–7–6	57	W
68	March 10	Columbus Blue Jackets	1–4	Tampa Bay Lightning	22–33–7–6	57	L
69	March 14	Calgary Flames	0–3	Columbus Blue Jackets	23–33–7–6	59	W
70	March 16	Columbus Blue Jackets	3–0	Atlanta Thrashers	24–33–7–6	61	W
71	March 17	New York Islanders	3–3	Columbus Blue Jackets	24–33–8–6	62	T
72	March 19	Nashville Predators	2–1	Columbus Blue Jackets	24–34–8–6	62	L
73	March 21	Vancouver Canucks	1–1	Columbus Blue Jackets	24–34–9–6	63	T
74	March 24	Calgary Flames	4–6	Columbus Blue Jackets	25–34–9–6	65	W
75	March 26	Columbus Blue Jackets	2–4	Edmonton Oilers	25–35–9–6	65	L
76	March 27	Columbus Blue Jackets	0–3	Calgary Flames	25–36–9–6	65	L
77	March 29	Columbus Blue Jackets	0–3	Los Angeles Kings	25–37–9–6	65	L

April: 3–2–0–0 (home: 3–0–0–0; road: 0–2–0–0)

Game	Date	Visitor	Score	Home	Record	Pts	Recap
78	April 1	St. Louis Blues	1–2	Columbus Blue Jackets	26–37–9–6	67	W
79	April 3	Detroit Red Wings	1–2	Columbus Blue Jackets	27–37–9–6	69	W
80	April 5	Columbus Blue Jackets	1–4	St. Louis Blues	27–38–9–6	69	L
81	April 6	Columbus Blue Jackets	2–3	Minnesota Wild	27–39–9–6	69	L
82	April 8	Chicago Blackhawks	3–4	Columbus Blue Jackets	28–39–9–6	71	W

Legend: W Win (2 points) L Loss (0 points) T Tie (1 point) OTL Overtime loss (1 point)

== Player statistics ==
=== Scoring ===
- Position abbreviations: C = Center; D = Defense; G = Goaltender; LW = Left wing; RW = Right wing
- † = Joined team via a transaction (e.g., trade, waivers, signing) during the season. Stats reflect time with the Blue Jackets only.
- ‡ = Left team via a transaction (e.g., trade, waivers, release) during the season. Stats reflect time with the Blue Jackets only.

No.	Player	Pos	Regular season					
No.	Player	Pos	GP	G	A	Pts	+/-	PIM
8	Geoff Sanderson	LW	68	30	26	56	4	46
21	Espen Knutsen	C	66	11	42	53	−3	30
57	Steve Heinze‡	RW	65	22	20	42	−19	38
28	Tyler Wright	C	76	16	16	32	−9	140
9	David Vyborny	RW	79	13	19	32	−9	22
10	Serge Aubin	LW	81	13	17	30	−20	107
6	Jamie Heward	D	69	11	16	27	3	33
7	Deron Quint	D	57	7	16	23	−19	16
25	Bruce Gardiner	RW	73	7	15	22	−1	78
42	Kevyn Adams‡	C	66	8	12	20	−4	52
18	Robert Kron	LW	59	8	11	19	4	10
29 (Note: Selivanov wore number 23 in his first two games.)	Alexander Selivanov	RW	59	8	11	19	−11	38
4	Lyle Odelein	D	81	3	14	17	−16	118
33	Petteri Nummelin	D	61	4	12	16	−11	10
11	Kevin Dineen	RW	66	8	7	15	2	126
5	Jamie Pushor	D	75	3	10	13	7	94
37	Mattias Timander	D	76	2	9	11	−8	24
22	Chris Nielsen	RW	29	4	5	9	4	4
3	Frantisek Kucera‡	D	48	2	5	7	−5	12
15	Mike Maneluk	LW	39	5	1	6	−11	33
34	Jean-Luc Grand-Pierre	D	64	1	4	5	−6	73
43	Jan Caloun‡	RW	11	0	3	3	−8	2
17	Steve Maltais	LW	26	0	3	3	−9	12
14	Ray Whitney†	LW	3	0	3	3	−1	2
44	Rostislav Klesla	D	8	2	0	2	−1	6
32	Radim Bicanek	D	9	0	2	2	1	6
40	Bill Bowler	C	9	0	2	2	−3	8
29	Krzysztof Oliwa‡	LW	10	0	2	2	1	34
27	Blake Sloan†	RW	14	1	0	1	−2	13
20	Martin Spanhel	LW	6	1	0	1	−1	2
31	Ron Tugnutt	G	53	0	1	1		2
23 (Note: Dahl wore number 27 in his first three games.)	Kevin Dahl	D	4	0	0	0	1	2
19	Mathieu Darche	LW	9	0	0	0	−4	0
41	Matt Davidson	RW	5	0	0	0	2	0
30	Marc Denis	G	32	0	0	0		2
12	Ted Drury	C	1	0	0	0	−3	0
24	Michael Gaul	D	2	0	0	0	0	4
36	Sean Selmser	LW	1	0	0	0	0	5
45	Jody Shelley†	LW	1	0	0	0	0	10

=== Goaltending ===
No.	Player	Regular season									
No.	Player	GP	W	L	T	SA	GA	GAA	SV%	SO	TOI
31	Ron Tugnutt	53	22	25	5	1528	127	2.44	.917	4	3129
30	Marc Denis	32	6	20	4	940	99	3.25	.895	0	1830

== Awards and records ==
=== Awards ===
Type	Award/honor	Recipient	Ref
League (in-season)	NHL Player of the Week	Marc Denis (December 11)	
League (in-season)	NHL Player of the Week	Ron Tugnutt (March 19)	
Team	Three Stars Award	Ron Tugnutt	

=== Milestones ===
Milestone	Player	Date	Ref
First game	Rostislav Klesla	October 7, 2000	
First game	Petteri Nummelin	October 7, 2000	
First game	David Vyborny	October 7, 2000	
First game	Matt Davidson	December 2, 2000	
First game	Chris Nielsen	December 14, 2000	
First game	Bill Bowler	December 27, 2000	
First game	Jody Shelley	February 17, 2001	
First game	Mathieu Darche	February 21, 2001	
First game	Martin Spanhel	March 16, 2001	
First game	Sean Selmser	March 27, 2001	

== Transactions ==
The Blue Jackets were involved in the following transactions through June 9, 2001, the day of the deciding game of the 2001 Stanley Cup Final.

=== Trades ===
Date	Details		Ref
May 11, 2000	To Columbus Blue Jackets: Chris Nielsen	To New York Islanders: 4th-round pick in 2000; 9th-round pick in 2000	
May 25, 2000	To Columbus Blue Jackets: Rights to Espen Knutsen	To Anaheim Mighty Ducks: 4th-round pick in 2001	
June 7, 2000	To Columbus Blue Jackets: Marc Denis	To Colorado Avalanche: 2nd-round pick in 2000	
June 11, 2000	To Columbus Blue Jackets: Jan Caloun; 9th-round pick in 2000; Future considerations	To San Jose Sharks: Future considerations (Note: Columbus agreed not to select Evgeni Nabokov in the expansion draft.)	
June 12, 2000	To Columbus Blue Jackets: Krzysztof Oliwa; Future considerations (Note: New Jersey assigned Deron Quint’s rights to Columbus on June 23.)	To New Jersey Devils: 3rd-round pick in 2001; Future considerations (Note: Columbus sent Turner Stevenson to New Jersey on June 23 to complete the trade.)	
June 23, 2000	To Columbus Blue Jackets: 5th-round pick in 2000	To Boston Bruins: Future considerations (Note: Columbus received the pick for agreeing to select Steve Heinze in the expansion draft.)	
June 23, 2000	To Columbus Blue Jackets: Matt Davidson; Jean-Luc Grand-Pierre; 5th-round pick in 2000; 5th-round pick in 2001	To Buffalo Sabres: Past considerations (Note: Columbus received Davidson, Grand-Pierre, and the draft picks for agreeing to select Dwayne Roloson and Geoff Sanderson in the expansion draft.)	
June 23, 2000	To Columbus Blue Jackets: 2nd-round pick in 2001	To Montreal Canadiens: Future considerations (Note: Columbus received the pick for agreeing to select Frederic Chabot in the expansion draft.)	
June 25, 2000	To Columbus Blue Jackets: 9th-round pick in 2000	To Florida Panthers: 9th-round pick in 2001	
June 25, 2000	To Columbus Blue Jackets: 9th-round pick in 2000	To Detroit Red Wings: 9th-round pick in 2002	
August 17, 2000	To Columbus Blue Jackets: Kent McDonell	To Detroit Red Wings: 6th-round pick in 2003	
November 9, 2000	To Columbus Blue Jackets: Jean-Francois Labbe	To New York Rangers: Bert Robertsson	
January 15, 2001	To Columbus Blue Jackets: 3rd-round pick in 2001	To Pittsburgh Penguins: Krzysztof Oliwa	
March 13, 2001	To Columbus Blue Jackets: Ray Whitney; Future considerations	To Florida Panthers: Kevyn Adams; 4th-round pick in 2001	
March 13, 2001	To Columbus Blue Jackets: 3rd-round pick in 2001	To Buffalo Sabres: Steve Heinze	
March 13, 2001	To Columbus Blue Jackets: 6th-round pick in 2001	To Pittsburgh Penguins: Frantisek Kucera	

=== Players acquired ===
Date	Player	Former team	Term	Via	Ref
May 4, 2000	Greg Gardner	Niagara University (CHA)	1-year	Free agency	
May 8, 2000	Mathieu Darche	McGill University (CIAU)		Free agency	
May 8, 2000	Jonathan Schill	Kingston Frontenacs (OHL)		Free agency	
May 16, 2000	Jeremy Reich	Swift Current Broncos (WHL)		Free agency	
May 16, 2000	Dan Watson	Sarnia Sting (OHL)		Free agency	
May 26, 2000	Jamie Heward	New York Islanders		Waivers	
May 31, 2000	Blake Bellefeuille	Boston College (HE)		Free agency	
June 1, 2000	Reggie Savage	Syracuse Crunch (AHL)		Free agency	
June 5, 2000	Brad Moran	Calgary Hitmen (WHL)	multi-year	Free agency	
June 7, 2000	Martin Spanhel	HC Plzen (ELH)	2-year	Free agency	
June 7, 2000	David Vyborny	HC Sparta Praha (ELH)	2-year	Free agency	
July 4, 2000	Ron Tugnutt	Pittsburgh Penguins	multi-year	Free agency	
July 7, 2000	Frantisek Kucera	HC Sparta Praha (ELH)		Free agency	
July 20, 2000	Serge Aubin	Colorado Avalanche		Free agency	
August 3, 2000	Bill Bowler	Manitoba Moose (IHL)		Free agency	
August 3, 2000	Sean Selmser	Hamilton Bulldogs (AHL)		Free agency	
August 3, 2000	Andrei Sryubko	Grand Rapids Griffins (IHL)		Free agency	
August 8, 2000	Sergei Klimentiev	Ak Bars Kazan (RSL)		Free agency	
August 24, 2000	Kevin Dahl	Chicago Wolves (IHL)		Free agency	
August 24, 2000	Michael Gaul	Colorado Avalanche		Free agency	
August 24, 2000	Mike Maneluk	Philadelphia Flyers		Free agency	
September 24, 2000	Tyler Sloan	Calgary Royals (AJHL)		Free agency	
October 10, 2000	Steve Maltais	Chicago Wolves (IHL)	1-year	Free agency	
November 22, 2000	Alexander Selivanov	Edmonton Oilers	1-year	Free agency	
February 1, 2001	Jody Shelley	Syracuse Crunch (AHL)		Free agency	
March 13, 2001	Blake Sloan	Dallas Stars		Waivers	
May 7, 2001	Karl Goehring	University of North Dakota (WCHA)		Free agency	
May 7, 2001	Duvie Westcott	St. Cloud State University (WCHA)		Free agency	
May 18, 2001	Sean Pronger	New York Islanders		Waivers	
May 19, 2001	Brett Harkins	Houston Aeros (IHL)		Free agency	
May 31, 2001	Jeff Ware	Syracuse Crunch (AHL)		Free agency	

=== Players lost ===
Date	Player	New team	Via (Note: In parentheses is the player's free agency group on July 1 if applicable.)	Ref
July 1, 2000	Dallas Drake	St. Louis Blues	Free agency (III)	
July 12, 2000	Rick Tabaracci	Dallas Stars	Free agency (III)	
July 14, 2000	Dwayne Roloson	St. Louis Blues	Free agency (UFA)	
August 13, 2000	Mathieu Schneider	Los Angeles Kings	Free agency (III)	
September 11, 2000	Barrie Moore	Manitoba Moose (IHL)	Free agency (VI)	
November 22, 2000	Jan Caloun	HIFK (Liiga) (Note: Caloun signed with HIFK on November 28.)	Release	
May 16, 2001	Frederic Chabot	Nurnberg Ice Tigers (DEL)	Free agency	
June 1, 2001	Bill Bowler	Nashville Predators	Waivers	
June 1, 2001	Kevin Dahl	Nurnberg Ice Tigers (DEL)	Free agency	

=== Signings ===
Date	Player	Term	Contract type	Ref
May 25, 2000	Espen Knutsen	multi-year	Re-signing	
June 29, 2000	Lyle Odelein	multi-year	Re-signing	
July 25, 2000	Jan Caloun	multi-year	Re-signing	
July 25, 2000	Petteri Nummelin	multi-year	Entry-level	
July 25, 2000	Geoff Sanderson		Re-signing	
July 31, 2000	Matt Davidson		Re-signing	
July 31, 2000	Steve Heinze		Re-signing	
July 31, 2000	Krzysztof Oliwa		Re-signing	
August 8, 2000	Jonas Junkka		Entry-level	
August 10, 2000	Jean-Luc Grand-Pierre		Re-signing	
August 31, 2000	Marc Denis	multi-year	Re-signing	
October 2, 2000	Rostislav Klesla	3-year	Entry-level	
March 14, 2001	Radim Bicanek	multi-year	Extension	

== Draft picks ==
=== NHL expansion draft ===
Columbus' expansion draft picks at the 2000 NHL expansion draft.

#	Player	Drafted from
1.	Rick Tabaracci (G)	Colorado Avalanche
2.	Frederic Chabot (G)	Montreal Canadiens
3.	Dwayne Roloson (G)	Buffalo Sabres
4.	Mattias Timander (D)	Boston Bruins
5.	Bert Robertsson (D)	Edmonton Oilers
6.	Tommi Rajamaki (D)	Toronto Maple Leafs
7.	Jamie Pushor (D)	Dallas Stars
8.	Lyle Odelein (D)	Phoenix Coyotes
9.	Radim Bicanek (D)	Chicago Blackhawks
10.	Mathieu Schneider (D)	New York Rangers
11.	Jonas Junkka (D)	Pittsburgh Penguins
12.	Geoff Sanderson (LW)	Buffalo Sabres
13.	Turner Stevenson (RW)	Montreal Canadiens
14.	Robert Kron (C)	Carolina Hurricanes
15.	Steve Heinze (RW)	Boston Bruins
16.	Tyler Wright (C)	Pittsburgh Penguins
17.	Kevyn Adams (C)	Toronto Maple Leafs
18.	Dmitri Subbotin (F)	New York Rangers
19.	Dallas Drake (RW)	Phoenix Coyotes
20.	Bruce Gardiner (C)	Tampa Bay Lightning
21.	Barrie Moore (LW)	Washington Capitals
22.	Martin Streit (F)	Philadelphia Flyers
23.	Kevin Dineen (RW)	Ottawa Senators
24.	Jeff Williams (LW)	New Jersey Devils
25.	Sergei Luchinkin (RW)	Dallas Stars
26.	Ted Drury (C)	New York Islanders

=== NHL entry draft ===
Columbus' draft picks at the 2000 NHL entry draft.

Round	#	Player	Nationality	College/junior/club team (league)
1	4	Rostislav Klesla	Czech Republic	Brampton Battalion (OHL)
3	69	Ben Knopp	Canada	Moose Jaw Warriors (WHL)
5	133	Petteri Nummelin	Finland	HC Davos (Switzerland)
5	138	Scott Heffernan	Canada	Sarnia Sting (OHL)
5	150	Tyler Kolarik	United States	Deerfield Academy (USHS-MA)
6	169	Shane Bendera	Canada	Red Deer Rebels (WHL)
7	200	Janne Jokila	Finland	TPS (Finland)
8	231	Peter Zingoni	United States	New England Jr. Coyotes (EJHL)
9	278	Martin Paroulek	Czech Republic	HC Vsetín (Czech Republic)
9	286	Andrej Nedorost	Slovakia	Essen Mosquitoes (DEL)
9	292	Louis Mandeville	Canada	Rouyn-Noranda Huskies (QMJHL)
