= Anisimov =

Anisimov or Anisimoff (Russian: Ани́симов, from the male personal name Onisim, which later changed into Anisim) is a Russian masculine surname. Its feminine counterpart is Anisimova. It may refer to:

== Athletes ==
- Alexei Anisimov (ice hockey) (born 1984), Russian professional ice hockey goaltender
- Amanda Anisimova (born 2001), American tennis player
- Artem Anisimov (ice hockey, born 1976), Russian ice hockey player
- Artem Anisimov (born 1988), Russian ice hockey player
- Artyom Anisimov (footballer) (born 1991), Russian footballer
- Maksim Anisimov (born 1983), Belarusian ski jumper
- Natalya Anisimova (born 1960), Russian handball player
- Nina Valentinovna Anisimova (born 1973), Russian triathlete
- Sergei Anisimov (born 1990), Russian footballer
- Tatyana Anisimova (born 1949), Soviet hurdler
- Valery Anisimov (born 1937), Soviet wrestler
- Vera Anisimova (born 1952), Soviet sprinter

== Artists ==
- Alexander Anisimov (born 1947), Russian bass singer and conductor
- Domna Anisimova ("Blind Domna"), Russian poet
- Nina Aleksandrovna Anisimova (1909–1979), Russian dancer and choreographer
- Tanya Anisimova (born 1966), Russian cellist

== Other ==
- Mikhail Anisimov (born 1941), Russian and American interdisciplinary scientist
- Vasily Anisimov, Russian billionaire businessman
- Vasily Anisimoff (1878–1938), Russian revolutionary-menshevik
- Yevgeny Anisimov, head of Baikonur space center 2010–2014
