= 2000 NHL expansion draft =

Player selection draft

General information
- Date: June 23, 2000
- Location: Calgary, Alberta, Canada

Overview
- League: National Hockey League
- Expansion teams: Columbus Blue Jackets; Minnesota Wild
- Expansion season: 2000–01

The 2000 NHL expansion draft was held on June 23, 2000, in Calgary, Alberta, Canada. The draft took place to fill the rosters of the league's two expansion teams for the 2000–01 season, the Columbus Blue Jackets and the Minnesota Wild.

== Rules ==
26 of the 28 teams existing in the league at the time of the draft were each allowed to protect either one goaltender, five defensemen, and nine forwards or two goaltenders, three defensemen, and seven forwards. The Atlanta Thrashers and Nashville Predators had their entire rosters protected, as they were the two newest franchises in the league, only being in existence for one and two years respectively.

For teams protecting only one goaltender, there was no experience requirement for those left unprotected. For teams protecting two goaltenders, each goaltender left unprotected must have appeared in either 10 NHL games in the 1999–2000 season or 25 games in the 1998–99 season and 1999–2000 seasons combined. A goaltender had to be in net for at least 31 minutes in each game for the game to be counted against these totals.

At least one defenseman left unprotected by each team had to have appeared in at least 40 games in the 1999–2000 season or 70 games in the 1998–99 season and 1999–2000 seasons combined. At least two forwards left unprotected by each team had to have met the same requirements.

Fifty-two players were chosen in the draft; each previously existing team lost two players, and both expansion teams filled a roster of twenty-six players. Only one goaltender or one defenseman could be selected from each franchise. Both the Blue Jackets and the Wild were to use their first 24 selections on three goaltenders, eight defensemen, and thirteen forwards. The final two picks for each team could be any position.

== Protected players ==
=== Eastern Conference ===
Atlantic Division
Position	New Jersey	NY Islanders	NY Rangers	Philadelphia	Pittsburgh
Forwards	Jason Arnott	Mariusz Czerkawski	Jason Dawe	Mark Greig	Matthew Barnaby
Forwards	Sergei Brylin	Josh Green	Rob DiMaio	Daymond Langkow	Rene Corbet
Forwards	Patrik Elias	Brad Isbister	Radek Dvorak	John LeClair	Robert Dome
Forwards	Bobby Holik	Olli Jokinen	Theoren Fleury	Eric Lindros	Jan Hrdina
Forwards	John Madden	Claude Lapointe	Adam Graves	Kent Manderville	Jaromir Jagr
Forwards	Randy McKay	Mats Lindgren	Eric Lacroix	Gino Odjick	Alexei Kovalev
Forwards	Alexander Mogilny	Dmitri Nabokov	Darren Langdon	Keith Primeau	Robert Lang
Forwards	Jay Pandolfo	Dave Scatchard	Petr Nedved	Paul Ranheim	Alexei Morozov
Forwards	Petr Sykora	Steve Webb	Tim Taylor	Mark Recchi	Martin Straka
Defencemen	Josef Boumedienne	Eric Cairns	Jason Doig	Andy Delmore	Bob Boughner
Defencemen	Ken Daneyko	Zdeno Chara	Brian Leetch	Eric Desjardins	Sven Butenschon
Defencemen	Scott Niedermayer	Kenny Jonsson	Sylvain Lefebvre	Dan McGillis	Darius Kasparaitis
Defencemen	Scott Stevens	Jamie Rivers	Dale Purinton	Luke Richardson	Janne Laukkanen
Defencemen	Colin White	Ray Schultz	Stephane Quintal	Chris Therien	Jiri Slegr
Goaltender	Martin Brodeur	Kevin Weekes	Mike Richter	Brian Boucher	Jean-Sebastien Aubin

Northeast Division
Position	Boston	Buffalo	Montreal	Ottawa	Toronto
Forwards	Jason Allison	Curtis Brown	Benoit Brunet	Daniel Alfredsson	Sergei Berezin
Forwards	P. J. Axelsson	Chris Gratton	Saku Koivu	Magnus Arvedson	Tie Domi
Forwards	Anson Carter	Michael Peca	Trevor Linden	Radek Bonk	Jonas Hoglund
Forwards	Mike Knuble	Erik Rasmussen	Martin Rucinsky	Andreas Dackell	Dmitri Khristich
Forwards	Brian Rolston	Miroslav Satan	Brian Savage	Shawn McEachern	Igor Korolev
Forwards	Sergei Samsonov	Vaclav Varada	Sergei Zholtok	Vaclav Prospal	Yanic Perreault
Forwards	Joe Thornton		Dainius Zubrus	Andre Roy	Mats Sundin
Forwards					Steve Thomas
Forwards					Darcy Tucker
Defencemen	Hal Gill	Jay McKee	Patrice Brisebois	Chris Phillips	Cory Cross
Defencemen	Kyle McLaren	Rhett Warrener	Craig Rivet	Wade Redden	Alexander Karpovtsev
Defencemen	Darren Van Impe	Alexei Zhitnik	Sheldon Souray	Jason York	Danny Markov
Defencemen					Chris McAllister
Defencemen					Dmitri Yushkevich
Goaltender	Byron Dafoe	Martin Biron	Jeff Hackett	Jani Hurme	Curtis Joseph
Goaltender	John Grahame	Dominik Hasek	Jose Theodore	Patrick Lalime	

Southeast Division
Position	Carolina	Florida	Tampa Bay	Washington
Forwards	Bates Battaglia	Pavel Bure	Stan Drulia	James Black
Forwards	Rod Brind'Amour	Viktor Kozlov	Dwayne Hay	Peter Bondra
Forwards	Ron Francis	Oleg Kvasha	Brian Holzinger	Jan Bulis
Forwards	Sami Kapanen	Paul Laus	Mike Johnson	Ulf Dahlen
Forwards	Ian MacNeil	Scott Mellanby	Ryan Johnson	Steve Konowalchuk
Forwards	Sandy McCarthy	Rob Niedermayer	Fredrik Modin	Andrei Nikolishin
Forwards	Jeff O'Neill	Mike Sillinger	Wayne Primeau	Adam Oates
Forwards	Gary Roberts	Ray Whitney	Jaroslav Svejkovsky	Chris Simon
Forwards	Shane Willis	Peter Worrell	Todd Warriner	Richard Zednik
Defencemen	Steven Halko	Bret Hedican	Sergey Gusev	Sergei Gonchar
Defencemen	Sean Hill	John Jakopin	Pavel Kubina	Calle Johansson
Defencemen	Marek Malik	Todd Simpson	Marek Posmyk	Ken Klee
Defencemen	Nolan Pratt	Robert Svehla	Petr Svoboda	Joe Reekie
Defencemen	Glen Wesley	Mike Wilson	Andrei Zyuzin	Brendan Witt
Goaltender	Arturs Irbe	Trevor Kidd	Dan Cloutier	Olaf Kolzig

=== Western Conference ===
Central Division
Position	Chicago	Detroit	St. Louis
Forwards	Tony Amonte	Kris Draper	Lubos Bartecko
Forwards	Eric Daze	Sergei Fedorov	Craig Conroy
Forwards	Michal Grosek	Tomas Holmstrom	Pavol Demitra
Forwards	Jean-Yves Leroux	Vyacheslav Kozlov	Michal Handzus
Forwards	Dean McAmmond	Martin Lapointe	Jamal Mayers
Forwards	Michael Nylander	Kirk Maltby	Pierre Turgeon
Forwards	Steve Sullivan	Darren McCarty	Scott Young
Forwards	Ryan VandenBussche	Brendan Shanahan	
Forwards	Alexei Zhamnov	Steve Yzerman	
Defencemen	Jamie Allison	Chris Chelios	Al MacInnis
Defencemen	Brad Brown	Mathieu Dandenault	Chris Pronger
Defencemen	Anders Eriksson	Steve Duchesne	Bryce Salvador
Defencemen	Bryan McCabe	Nicklas Lidstrom	
Defencemen	Boris Mironov	Aaron Ward	
Goaltender	Jocelyn Thibault	Chris Osgood	Brent Johnson
Goaltender			Roman Turek

Northwest Division
Position	Calgary	Colorado	Edmonton	Vancouver
Forwards	Valeri Bure	Adam Deadmarsh	Mike Grier	Todd Bertuzzi
Forwards	Jarome Iginla	Chris Dingman	Bill Guerin	Donald Brashear
Forwards	Bill Lindsay	Peter Forsberg	Chad Kilger	Andrew Cassels
Forwards	Andrei Nazarov	Dan Hinote	Georges Laraque	Trent Klatt
Forwards	Marc Savard	Brad Larsen	Todd Marchant	Brendan Morrison
Forwards	Jeff Shantz	Ville Nieminen	Ethan Moreau	Markus Naslund
Forwards	Cory Stillman	Shjon Podein	Rem Murray	Denis Pederson
Forwards	Jason Wiemer	Joe Sakic	Ryan Smyth	Peter Schaefer
Forwards	Clarke Wilm	Stephane Yelle	Doug Weight	Vadim Sharifijanov
Defencemen	Tommy Albelin	Ray Bourque	Sean Brown	Adrian Aucoin
Defencemen	Wade Belak	Adam Foote	Roman Hamrlik	Murray Baron
Defencemen	Denis Gauthier	Jon Klemm	Janne Niinimaa	Ed Jovanovski
Defencemen	Phil Housley	Aaron Miller	Jason Smith	Mattias Ohlund
Defencemen	Derek Morris	Sandis Ozolinsh	Igor Ulanov	Jason Strudwick
Goaltender	Fred Brathwaite	Patrick Roy	Tommy Salo	Felix Potvin

Pacific Division
Position	Anaheim	Dallas	Los Angeles	Phoenix	San Jose
Forwards	Antti Aalto	Aaron Gavey	Kelly Buchberger	Daniel Briere	Vincent Damphousse
Forwards	Marc Chouinard	Brett Hull	Ian Laperriere	Shane Doan	Jeff Friesen
Forwards	Matt Cullen	Mike Keane	Glen Murray	Travis Green	Todd Harvey
Forwards	Paul Kariya	Jamie Langenbrunner	Zigmund Palffy	Trevor Letowski	Alexander Korolyuk
Forwards	Ladislav Kohn	Jere Lehtinen	Luc Robitaille	Robert Reichel	Patrick Marleau
Forwards	Mike Leclerc	Grant Marshall	Bryan Smolinski	Mikael Renberg	Owen Nolan
Forwards	Marty McInnis	Mike Modano	Jozef Stumpel	Jeremy Roenick	Mike Ricci
Forwards	Steve Rucchin	Kirk Muller		Keith Tkachuk	Marco Sturm
Forwards	Teemu Selanne	Joe Nieuwendyk		Juha Ylonen	Niklas Sundstrom
Defencemen	Jason Marshall	Derian Hatcher	Aki Berg	Keith Carney	Shawn Heins
Defencemen	Ruslan Salei	Ric Jackman	Rob Blake	Jyrki Lumme	Bryan Marchment
Defencemen	Patrick Traverse	Richard Matvichuk	Mattias Norstrom	Stanislav Neckar	Marcus Ragnarsson
Defencemen	Pavel Trnka	Darryl Sydor		Teppo Numminen	Mike Rathje
Defencemen	Oleg Tverdovsky	Sergei Zubov		Radoslav Suchy	Gary Suter
Goaltender	Jean-Sebastien Giguere	Ed Belfour	Stephane Fiset	Nikolai Khabibulin	Steve Shields
Goaltender			Jamie Storr		

== Draft results ==
#	Player	Drafted from	Drafted by
1	Rick Tabaracci (G)	Colorado Avalanche	Columbus Blue Jackets
2	Jamie McLennan (G)	St. Louis Blues	Minnesota Wild
3	Mike Vernon (G)	Florida Panthers	Minnesota Wild
4	Frederic Chabot (G)	Montreal Canadiens	Columbus Blue Jackets
5	Dwayne Roloson (G)	Buffalo Sabres	Columbus Blue Jackets
6	Chris Terreri (G)	New Jersey Devils	Minnesota Wild
7	Sean O'Donnell (D)	Los Angeles Kings	Minnesota Wild
8	Mattias Timander (D)	Boston Bruins	Columbus Blue Jackets
9	Bert Robertsson (D)	Edmonton Oilers	Columbus Blue Jackets
10	Curtis Leschyshyn (D)	Carolina Hurricanes	Minnesota Wild
11	Tommi Rajamaki (D)	Toronto Maple Leafs	Columbus Blue Jackets
12	Ladislav Benysek (D)	Mighty Ducks of Anaheim	Minnesota Wild
13	Chris Armstrong (D)	San Jose Sharks	Minnesota Wild
14	Jamie Pushor (D)	Dallas Stars	Columbus Blue Jackets
15	Filip Kuba (D)	Calgary Flames	Minnesota Wild
16	Lyle Odelein (D)	Phoenix Coyotes	Columbus Blue Jackets
17	Radim Bicanek (D)	Chicago Blackhawks	Columbus Blue Jackets
18	Oleg Orekhovsky (D)	Washington Capitals	Minnesota Wild
19	Mathieu Schneider (D)	New York Rangers	Columbus Blue Jackets
20	Ian Herbers (D)	New York Islanders	Minnesota Wild
21	Artem Anisimov (D)	Philadelphia Flyers	Minnesota Wild
22	Jonas Junkka (D)	Pittsburgh Penguins	Columbus Blue Jackets
23	Geoff Sanderson (LW)	Buffalo Sabres	Columbus Blue Jackets
24	Stacy Roest (C)	Detroit Red Wings	Minnesota Wild
25	Darryl Laplante (C)	Detroit Red Wings	Minnesota Wild
26	Turner Stevenson (RW)	Montreal Canadiens	Columbus Blue Jackets
27	Scott Pellerin (LW)	St. Louis Blues	Minnesota Wild
28	Robert Kron (C)	Carolina Hurricanes	Columbus Blue Jackets
29	Steve Heinze (RW)	Boston Bruins	Columbus Blue Jackets
30	Jim Dowd (C)	Edmonton Oilers	Minnesota Wild
31	Tyler Wright (C)	Pittsburgh Penguins	Columbus Blue Jackets
32	Sergei Krivokrasov (RW)	Calgary Flames	Minnesota Wild
33	Jeff Nielsen (RW)	Mighty Ducks of Anaheim	Minnesota Wild
34	Kevyn Adams (C)	Toronto Maple Leafs	Columbus Blue Jackets
35	Jeff Odgers (RW)	Colorado Avalanche	Minnesota Wild
36	Dmitri Subbotin (F)	New York Rangers	Columbus Blue Jackets
37	Steve McKenna (F)	Los Angeles Kings	Minnesota Wild
38	Dallas Drake (RW)	Phoenix Coyotes	Columbus Blue Jackets
39	Bruce Gardiner (C)	Tampa Bay Lightning	Columbus Blue Jackets
40	Michal Bros (F)	San Jose Sharks	Minnesota Wild
41	Joe Juneau (C)	Ottawa Senators	Minnesota Wild
42	Barrie Moore (LW)	Washington Capitals	Columbus Blue Jackets
43	Darby Hendrickson (C)	Vancouver Canucks	Minnesota Wild
44	Martin Streit (F)	Philadelphia Flyers	Columbus Blue Jackets
45	Kevin Dineen (RW)	Ottawa Senators	Columbus Blue Jackets
46	Jeff Daw (C)	Chicago Blackhawks	Minnesota Wild
47	Jeff Williams (LW)	New Jersey Devils	Columbus Blue Jackets
48	Stefan Nilsson (F)	Vancouver Canucks	Minnesota Wild
49	Zac Bierk (G)	Tampa Bay Lightning	Minnesota Wild
50	Sergei Luchinkin (RW)	Dallas Stars	Columbus Blue Jackets
51	Cam Stewart (LW)	Florida Panthers	Minnesota Wild
52	Ted Drury (C)	New York Islanders	Columbus Blue Jackets

== Deals ==
In return for agreeing not to select certain unprotected players, the Blue Jackets and Wild were granted concessions by other franchises. The trades not involving Blue Jacket or Wild draft picks were booked as being for "future considerations":

Columbus

- San Jose traded Jan Caloun, a ninth-round pick (Martin Paroulek) in the 2000 NHL entry draft, and a conditional pick in the 2001 NHL entry draft to Columbus on June 11, 2000, after the Blue Jackets agreed not to select Evgeni Nabokov.
- Buffalo traded Jean-Luc Grand-Pierre, Matt Davidson, and two fifth-round draft picks, one each in the 2000 (Tyler Kolarik) and 2001 (Andreas Jamtin) Entry Drafts, to Columbus on June 23, 2000, after the Blue Jackets agreed not to select Dominik Hasek or Martin Biron.

Minnesota

- San Jose traded Andy Sutton, a seventh-round pick (Peter Bartos) in the 2000 Entry Draft and a third-round pick (later traded to Columbus - (Aaron Johnson)) in the 2001 Entry Draft to Minnesota on June 11, 2000, for an eighth-round pick in the 2000 Entry Draft after the Wild agreed not to select Evgeni Nabokov.

== Post-draft ==
Several of the players selected by the Blue Jackets and Wild in the Expansion Draft did not stay with the teams long after the draft. In fact, several players were traded later in the same day:

Columbus

- Turner Stevenson (traded to New Jersey to complete an earlier transaction)

Minnesota

- Mike Vernon (traded to Calgary for Dan Cavanaugh and an eighth-round pick (Joe Campbell) in the 2001 NHL entry draft)
- Chris Terreri (traded with a ninth-round pick (Thomas Ziegler) in the 2000 NHL entry draft to New Jersey for Brad Bombardir)
- Joe Juneau (traded to Phoenix for Rickard Wallin)

Other players who were no longer on the rosters of the teams which drafted them for the 1999–2000 season include the following:

Columbus

- Dallas Drake (signed by St. Louis on July 1, 2000)
- Mathieu Schneider (signed by Los Angeles on August 13, 2000)
- Dwayne Roloson (signed with AHL's Worcester IceCats rather than joining Columbus)

Minnesota

- Jeff Odgers (claimed off waivers by Atlanta on September 29, 2000)

== See also ==
- 2000 NHL entry draft
- 2000–01 NHL season
