= Alexei Anisimov =

Aleksei or Alexei Anisimov may refer to:

- Aleksei Anisimov (actor), Russian actor who appeared in the 2005 film First on the Moon
- Alexei Anisimov (ice hockey) (born 1984), Russian professional ice hockey goaltender
