= Anissimov =

Anissimov is a Russian surname. Notable people with the surname include:

- Alexander Anisimov (born 1947), Russian conductor
- Ellina Anissimova (born 1992), Estonian hammer thrower
- Myriam Anissimov (born 1943), French writer

== See also ==
- Anisimov
