= Martin Streit =

Czech ice hockey player

- Born: February 2, 1977 (age 49) Vyškov, Czechoslovakia
- Height: 6 ft 2 in (188 cm)
- Weight: 209 lb (95 kg; 14 st 13 lb)
- Position: Left wing
- Shot: Right
- Played for: HC Olomouc; HC Karlovy Vary; HC Vítkovice; HC Havířov; HC Vsetín
- NHL draft: 178th overall, 1995; Philadelphia Flyers
- Playing career: 1995–2005

Martin Streit (born February 2, 1977) is a Czech former professional ice hockey winger who played in the Czech Extraliga. Streit was drafted in the seventh round, 178th overall, of the 1995 NHL entry draft by the Philadelphia Flyers. He was also selected in the 2000 NHL Expansion Draft by the Columbus Blue Jackets.

== Career statistics ==
=== Regular season and playoffs ===
			Regular season					Playoffs
Season	Team	League	GP	G	A	Pts	PIM	GP	G	A	Pts	PIM
1995–96	HC Olomouc	CZE U20	19	10	6	16	—	—	—	—	—	—
1995–96	HC Olomouc	ELH	10	0	0	0	4	—	—	—	—	—
1996–97	HC Olomouc	ELH	17	1	2	3	12	—	—	—	—	—
1997–98	HC Becherovka Karlovy Vary	ELH	48	5	12	17	10	—	—	—	—	—
1998–99	HC Becherovka Karlovy Vary	ELH	45	9	5	14	34	—	—	—	—	—
1999–2000	HC Becherovka Karlovy Vary	ELH	18	0	2	2	20	—	—	—	—	—
1999–2000	HC Vítkovice	ELH	31	3	6	9	32	—	—	—	—	—
2000–01	HC Becherovka Karlovy Vary	ELH	14	0	1	1	12	—	—	—	—	—
2000–01	HC Femax Havířov	ELH	11	0	0	0	6	—	—	—	—	—
2000–01	HC Prostějov	CZE.2	1	1	0	1	0	—	—	—	—	—
2001–02	HC Vsetín	ELH	35	3	4	7	65	—	—	—	—	—
2002–03	HC Vsetín	ELH	47	8	5	13	46	4	0	0	0	2
2003–04	HC Prostějov	CZE.2	39	4	6	10	61	—	—	—	—	—
2004–05	HC Uničov	CZE.3	12	2	4	6	12	—	—	—	—	—
ELH totals			276	29	37	66	251	4	0	0	0	2

=== International ===
Year	Team	Event	GP	G	A	Pts	PIM
1995	Czech Republic	EJC	5	1	4	5	0
1997	Czech Republic	WJC	7	0	0	0	14
Junior totals			12	1	4	5	14
