= Matt Davidson (ice hockey) =

Canadian ice hockey player (1977–2026)

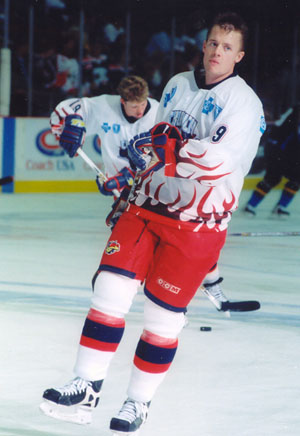
- Davidson with the Syracuse Crunch during the 2001–02 season
- Born: August 9, 1977 Flin Flon, Manitoba, Canada
- Died: April 27, 2026 (aged 48) Edmonton, Alberta, Canada
- Height: 6 ft 2 in (188 cm)
- Weight: 190 lb (86 kg; 13 st 8 lb)
- Position: Right wing
- Played for: Columbus Blue Jackets; DEG Metro Stars; Sinupret Ice Tigers; KalPa; Frederikshavn White Hawks; Tingsryds AIF
- NHL draft: 94th overall, 1995; Buffalo Sabres
- Playing career: 1997–2011

Matthew Blair Davidson (August 9, 1977 – April 27, 2026) was a Canadian ice hockey right winger. He played 56 games in the National Hockey League with the Columbus Blue Jackets between 2000 and 2003. The rest of his career, which lasted from 1997 to 2011, was spent in the American Hockey League and then in several European leagues.

== Career ==
Davidson was drafted in the fourth round, 94th overall, by the Buffalo Sabres in the 1995 NHL entry draft. After playing four seasons with the Portland Winter Hawks of the Western Hockey League, Davidson made his professional debut with the Sabres' AHL affiliate, the Rochester Americans. He played three seasons with the Americans before the Sabres traded his rights to the Columbus Blue Jackets as part of a deal during the 2000 NHL Expansion Draft. Davidson played in 56 NHL games over three seasons with the Blue Jackets, scoring five goals and adding seven assists.

During the 2004–05 NHL lockout, Davidson went to Germany to join the DEG Metro Stars of the Deutsche Eishockey League. While the NHL resumed play in 2005–06, Davidson remained in Germany and played with the Sinupret Ice Tigers, before making the move to Finland for the 2006–07 season.

He signed a two-year contract (2007–08 and 2008–09) in Denmark for the Frederikshavn Whitehawks. He then spent two years in Sweden and subsequently retired in 2011.

== Personal life and death ==
Matt Davidson was the son of Blair Davidson who played briefly in the World Hockey Association.

Davidson died at his home in Edmonton on April 27, 2026, at the age of 48.

== Career statistics ==
			Regular season					Playoffs
Season	Team	League	GP	G	A	Pts	PIM	GP	G	A	Pts	PIM
1992–93	Saskatoon Contacts AAA	SMHL	36	14	18	32	36	—	—	—	—	—
1993–94	Portland Winter Hawks	WHL	59	4	12	16	18	10	0	0	0	4
1994–95	Portland Winter Hawks	WHL	72	17	20	37	51	9	1	3	4	0
1995–96	Portland Winter Hawks	WHL	70	24	26	50	96	7	2	2	4	2
1996–97	Portland Winter Hawks	WHL	72	44	27	71	47	6	0	1	1	2
1997–98	Rochester Americans	AHL	72	15	12	27	12	3	1	0	1	2
1998–99	Rochester Americans	AHL	80	26	15	41	44	18	2	1	3	6
1999–2000	Rochester Americans	AHL	80	12	20	32	30	19	4	2	6	8
2000–01	Columbus Blue Jackets	NHL	5	0	0	0	0	—	—	—	—	—
2000–01	Syracuse Crunch	AHL	72	14	11	25	24	5	1	2	3	2
2001–02	Columbus Blue Jackets	NHL	17	1	2	3	10	—	—	—	—	—
2001–02	Syracuse Crunch	AHL	47	9	11	20	64	8	1	3	4	4
2002–03	Columbus Blue Jackets	NHL	34	4	5	9	18	—	—	—	—	—
2002–03	Syracuse Crunch	AHL	48	18	16	34	26	—	—	—	—	—
2003–04	Lowell Lock Monsters	AHL	66	14	28	42	36	—	—	—	—	—
2004–05	DEG Metro Stars	DEL	49	6	8	14	52	—	—	—	—	—
2005–06	Nürnberg Ice Tigers	DEL	52	8	12	20	58	4	1	0	1	6
2006–07	KalPa	SM-l	55	16	9	25	44	—	—	—	—	—
2007–08	Frederikshavn White Hawks	DEN	37	18	10	28	96	18	7	10	17	18
2008–09	Frederikshavn White Hawks	DEN	44	21	34	45	64	7	2	5	7	4
2009–10	Tingsryds AIF	SWE-3	41	24	33	57	34	—	—	—	—	—
2010–11	Tingsryds AIF	Allsv	52	8	15	23	44	—	—	—	—	—
AHL totals			465	108	113	221	236	53	9	8	17	22
NHL totals			56	5	7	12	28	—	—	—	—	—
