= Jean-Luc Grand-Pierre =

Canadian ice hockey player

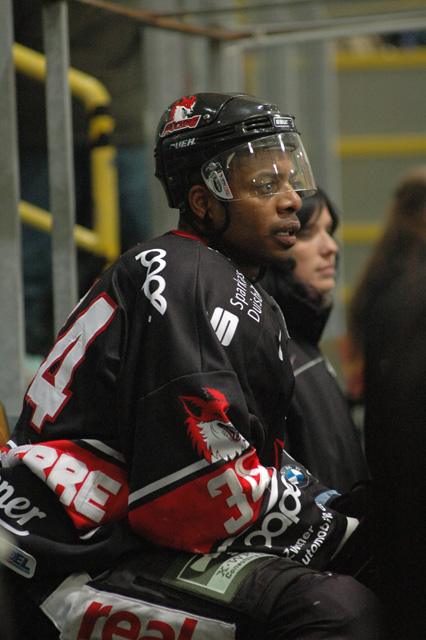
- Grand-Pierre with Füchse Duisburg in 2006
- Born: February 2, 1977 (age 49) Montreal, Quebec, Canada
- Height: 6 ft 3 in (191 cm)
- Weight: 228 lb (103 kg; 16 st 4 lb)
- Position: Defence
- Shot: Right
- Played for: NHL; Buffalo Sabres; Columbus Blue Jackets; Atlanta Thrashers; Washington Capitals; DEL; Füchse Duisburg; DEG Metro Stars; Swe-1; Troja/Ljungby; Leksands IF; Malmö Redhawks; Karlskrona HK; GET; Stjernen; Oberliga; Füchse Duisburg
- NHL draft: 179th overall, 1995; St. Louis Blues
- Playing career: 1997–2013

Jean-Luc Grand-Pierre (born February 2, 1977) is a Canadian former professional ice hockey defenceman and current studio analyst for the Columbus Blue Jackets on FanDuel Sports Network Ohio.

He was drafted in the seventh round, 179th overall, by the St. Louis Blues in the 1995 NHL entry draft. He once won the Speed Skating competition of the AHL All-Star Game, beating Martin St. Louis among others.

== Career ==
After playing four seasons in the Quebec Major Junior Hockey League, Grand-Pierre made his professional debut in the American Hockey League with the Rochester Americans during the 1997–98 season, recording ten points and 211 penalty minutes in 75 games. During the 1998–99 season, he made his NHL debut with the Buffalo Sabres, appearing in 16 games.

After once again spending part of the season with the Sabres in 1999–2000, Grand-Pierre was traded to the Columbus Blue Jackets during the 2000 NHL Expansion Draft. Grand-Pierre spent three full seasons with Columbus before splitting the 2003–04 season between the Blue Jackets, Atlanta Thrashers, and Washington Capitals. In his NHL career, Grand-Pierre appeared in 269 games, scoring seven goals and 13 assists.

Grand-Pierre spent the 2005–06 season with the Füchse Duisburg of Germany's Deutsche Eishockey Liga before joining the DEG Metro Stars for the 2006–07 season. He then signed with the New Jersey Devils of the National Hockey League for the 2007–08 season, spending the entire season with the Devils' AHL affiliate, the Lowell Devils. In 2008, he returned to Duisburg. On July 20, 2009, it was announced that he had signed a one-year deal with Leksands IF of the Swedish second tier league HockeyAllsvenskan (Swe-1). He was loaned out to Stjernen of the Norwegian GET-ligaen for 10 matches in the fall of 2009.

Grand-Pierre was rented by the Finnish SM-liiga team TPS prior to the 2010–11 season, for taxation reasons. He played for the team until October 15, 2010.

Grand-Pierre was released from the Leksands IF organization on September 1, 2011. Subsequently, he signed a one-year contract with the Swe-1 team Malmö Redhawks on October 4, 2011.

== Personal life ==
Grand-Pierre, of Haitian descent, is a cousin of Georges Laraque and QMJHL-player Jules-Edy Laraque. He is a licensed real estate agent in the state of Ohio, and currently works for HER Real Living and The Raines Group.

On January 4, 2024, Grand-Pierre gained U.S. citizenship.

== Career statistics ==
			Regular season					Playoffs
Season	Team	League	GP	G	A	Pts	PIM	GP	G	A	Pts	PIM
1992–93	Laval Régents	QMAAA	1	0	0	0	2	—	—	—	—	—
1993–94	Beauport Harfangs	QMJHL	46	1	4	5	27	—	—	—	—	—
1994–95	Val–d'Or Foreurs	QMJHL	59	10	13	23	126	—	—	—	—	—
1995–96	Val–d'Or Foreurs	QMJHL	67	13	21	34	209	13	1	4	5	47
1996–97	Val–d'Or Foreurs	QMJHL	58	9	24	33	196	13	5	8	13	46
1997–98	Rochester Americans	AHL	75	4	6	10	211	4	0	0	0	2
1998–99	Buffalo Sabres	NHL	16	0	1	1	17	—	—	—	—	—
1998–99	Rochester Americans	AHL	55	5	4	9	90	—	—	—	—	—
1999–2000	Buffalo Sabres	NHL	11	0	0	0	15	4	0	0	0	4
1999–2000	Rochester Americans	AHL	62	5	8	13	124	17	0	1	1	40
2000–01	Columbus Blue Jackets	NHL	64	1	4	5	73	—	—	—	—	—
2001–02	Columbus Blue Jackets	NHL	81	2	6	8	90	—	—	—	—	—
2002–03	Columbus Blue Jackets	NHL	41	1	0	1	64	—	—	—	—	—
2002–03	Syracuse Crunch	AHL	2	1	0	1	6	—	—	—	—	—
2003–04	Columbus Blue Jackets	NHL	16	0	0	0	12	—	—	—	—	—
2003–04	Atlanta Thrashers	NHL	27	2	2	4	26	—	—	—	—	—
2003–04	Washington Capitals	NHL	13	1	0	1	14	—	—	—	—	—
2003–04	Syracuse Crunch	AHL	—	—	—	—	—	4	0	1	1	8
2004–05	IF Troja/Ljungby	Allsv	11	1	1	2	45	10	1	2	3	24
2005–06	Füchse Duisburg	DEL	45	10	9	19	176	—	—	—	—	—
2006–07	DEG Metro Stars	DEL	44	9	14	23	63	9	1	1	2	10
2007–08	Lowell Devils	AHL	63	3	5	8	82	—	—	—	—	—
2008–09	Füchse Duisburg	DEL	47	5	8	13	135	9	1	1	2	10
2009–10	Stjernen	NOR	7	0	0	0	10	—	—	—	—	—
2009–10	Leksands IF	Allsv	37	6	2	8	146	10	0	3	3	6
2010–11	TPS	SM-l	16	0	1	1	61	—	—	—	—	—
2010–11	Leksands IF	Allsv	19	2	3	5	55	—	—	—	—	—
2011–12	Malmö Redhawks	Allsv	44	2	5	7	91	6	1	1	2	6
2012–13	Füchse Duisburg	GER.3	7	3	3	6	12	—	—	—	—	—
2012–13	Karlskrona HK	Allsv	11	1	0	1	14	9	0	0	0	12
AHL totals			261	18	24	42	521	21	0	1	1	42
NHL totals			269	7	13	20	311	4	0	0	0	4
DEL totals			136	24	31	55	374	9	1	1	2	10
