= Radim Bičánek =

Czech ice hockey player

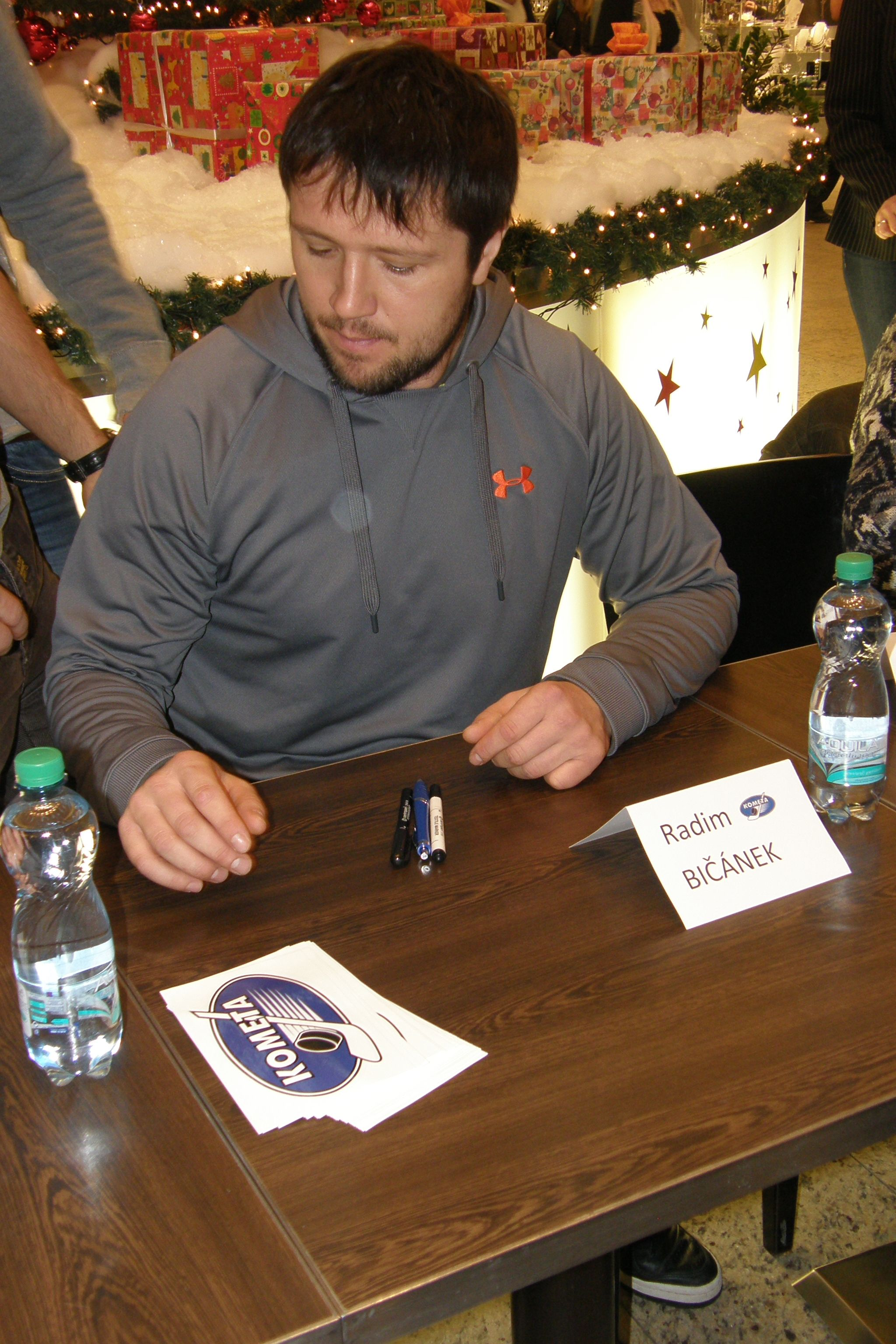
- Bičánek in 2011
- Born: January 18, 1975 (age 51) Uherské Hradiště, Czechoslovakia
- Height: 6 ft 1 in (185 cm)
- Weight: 198 lb (90 kg; 14 st 2 lb)
- Position: Defence
- Shot: Left
- Played for: HC Dukla Jihlava; Ottawa Senators; Chicago Blackhawks; Columbus Blue Jackets; HC Znojemští Orli; HC Kometa Brno; HC Karlovy Vary
- NHL draft: 27th overall, 1993; Ottawa Senators
- Playing career: 1995–2016

Radim Bičánek (born January 18, 1975) is a Czech former professional ice hockey defenceman who played in the National Hockey League (NHL). He was drafted in the second round, 27th overall, by the Ottawa Senators in the 1993 NHL entry draft.

== Playing career ==
After playing two seasons in the Ontario Hockey League for the Belleville Bulls, Bičánek made his National Hockey League debut with the Senators in the 1994–95 season, appearing in six games. He went on to spend the entire 1995–96 season with the Senators' American Hockey League affiliate, the Prince Edward Island Senators. Bičánek appeared in 21 more NHL games with Ottawa in the 1996–97 season.

After appearing sparingly for the Senators during the 1997–98 and 1998–99 seasons, Bičánek was traded to the Chicago Blackhawks on March 12, 1999, in exchange for a sixth-round pick in the 1999 NHL entry draft. The Blackhawks left him unprotected for the 2000 NHL Expansion Draft, allowing him to be selected by the Columbus Blue Jackets for their inaugural season.

During the 2004–05 NHL lockout, Bičánek returned to the Czech Republic to play for HC JME Znojemští Orli. After five seasons in Znojmo he moved to HC Kometa Brno.

== Career statistics ==
=== Regular season and playoffs ===
			Regular season					Playoffs
Season	Team	League	GP	G	A	Pts	PIM	GP	G	A	Pts	PIM
1992–93	Dukla Jihlava	CSSR	43	2	3	5	0	—	—	—	—	—
1993–94	Belleville Bulls	OHL	63	16	27	43	49	12	2	8	10	21
1994–95	Belleville Bulls	OHL	49	13	26	39	61	16	6	5	11	30
1994–95	Ottawa Senators	NHL	6	0	0	0	0	—	—	—	—	—
1994–95	Prince Edward Island Senators	AHL	—	—	—	—	—	3	0	1	1	0
1995–96	Prince Edward Island Senators	AHL	74	7	19	26	87	5	0	2	2	6
1996–97	Worcester IceCats	AHL	44	1	15	16	22	—	—	—	—	—
1996–97	Ottawa Senators	NHL	21	0	1	1	8	7	0	0	0	8
1997–98	Detroit Vipers	IHL	9	1	3	4	16	—	—	—	—	—
1997–98	Manitoba Moose	IHL	42	1	7	8	52	—	—	—	—	—
1997–98	Ottawa Senators	NHL	1	0	0	0	0	—	—	—	—	—
1998–99	Grand Rapids Griffins	IHL	46	8	17	25	48	—	—	—	—	—
1998–99	Ottawa Senators	NHL	7	0	0	0	4	—	—	—	—	—
1998–99	Chicago Blackhawks	NHL	7	0	0	0	6	—	—	—	—	—
1999–00	Cleveland Lumberjacks	IHL	70	5	27	32	125	9	2	2	4	8
1999–00	Chicago Blackhawks	NHL	11	0	3	3	4	—	—	—	—	—
2000–01	Syracuse Crunch	AHL	68	22	43	65	124	5	4	2	6	2
2000–01	Columbus Blue Jackets	NHL	9	0	2	2	6	—	—	—	—	—
2001–02	Columbus Blue Jackets	NHL	60	1	5	6	34	—	—	—	—	—
2002–03	Syracuse Crunch	AHL	56	6	17	23	111	—	—	—	—	—
2002–03	Binghamton Senators	AHL	21	3	10	13	42	14	2	4	6	26
2004–05	Orli Znojmo	CZE	51	8	18	26	108	—	—	—	—	—
2005–06	Orli Znojmo	CZE	49	6	11	17	132	11	0	1	1	20
2006–07	Orli Znojmo	CZE	49	10	5	15	90	—	—	—	—	—
2007–08	Orli Znojmo	CZE	45	8	10	18	109	3	0	0	0	27
2008–09	Orli Znojmo	CZE	48	8	6	14	128	—	—	—	—	—
2009–10	HC Kometa Brno	CZE	52	4	14	18	46	—	—	—	—	—
2010–11	HC Kometa Brno	CZE	40	5	12	17	44	—	—	—	—	—
2011–12	HC Kometa Brno	CZE	51	1	8	9	44	20	1	1	2	24
2012–13	HC Kometa Brno	CZE	49	9	5	14	94	—	—	—	—	—
2013–14	HC Karlovy Vary	CZE	51	2	7	9	62	—	—	—	—	—
2014–15	HC Karlovy Vary	CZE	27	3	5	8	45	—	—	—	—	—
2015–16	HC Karlovy Vary	CZE	50	6	16	22	46	—	—	—	—	—
CZE totals			562	70	117	187	948	74	6	9	15	97
AHL totals			263	39	104	143	386	27	6	9	15	34
NHL totals			122	1	11	12	62	7	0	0	0	8

=== International ===
Year	Team	Event	Result	GP	G	A	Pts	PIM
1993	Czechoslovakia	EJC18	3rd place, bronze medalist(s)	6	3	1	4	10
1993	Czechoslovakia	WJC	3rd place, bronze medalist(s)	7	1	0	1	0
Junior totals				13	4	1	5	10
