= Mikhail Anisimov =

Russian and American interdisciplinary scientist

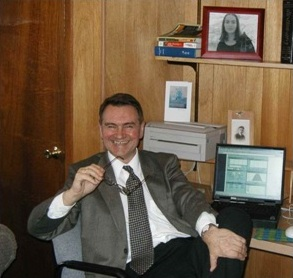
- Born: November 2, 1941 (age 84); Baku, USSR
- Education: Moscow State University
- Known for: Critical Phenomena and Phase Transitions in Fluids
- Scientific career
- Fields: Thermodynamics
- Workplaces: University of Maryland, College Park

Mikhail Alexeevich Anisimov (Russian: Михаил Алексе́евич Анисимов, born November 2, 1941, Baku, Azerbaijan, USSR) is a Russian and American interdisciplinary scientist.

== Early life ==
Anisimov received a degree in petroleum engineering from Grozny Petroleum Institute in 1964, a doctorate in physical chemistry from Moscow State University in 1969, and a doctor of science degree in molecular and thermal physics from the Kurchatov Institute of Atomic Energy in Moscow in 1976.

== Career ==
From 1969 through 1977, Anisimov worked at the U.S.S.R. State Committee for Standards and Product Quality Management (Russian: Госстандарт), where his postdoctoral mentor was Alexander V. Voronel. From 1978 until 1993, Anisimov was a professor and the chairman of the physics department of Gubkin Russian State University of Oil and Gas. In 1994, Anisimov began working in the United States as a professor for both the department of chemical and biomolecular engineering and for the Institute of Physical Science and Technology at the University of Maryland, College Park.

== Research ==
Anisimov’s field of research is mesoscopic thermodynamics of fluids and fluid mixtures, liquid crystals, polymers, and other soft-matter materials. His research group at the University of Maryland (jointly with Jan V. Sengers) has been one of the leading international authorities in the field of critical phenomena and phase transitions. Anisimov works in theory and experiments, fundamental problems and applications. He has been an author and a co-author of 3 books, 15 book chapters and review articles and more than 400 published journal and encyclopedia articles, conference proceedings and reports.

== Personal life ==
Anisimov has four children. His eldest daughter, Tanya Anisimova, was a cellist and composer.

== Honors and awards ==
- Distinguished University Professor, University of Maryland, College Park, 2016
- University System of Maryland Board of Regents’ Faculty Award, 2015
- Yeram S. Touloukian Award in Thermophysics (American Society of Mechanical Engineers), 2015
- Fellow of the American Institute of Chemical Engineers, 2014
- Foreign Member of the Russian Academy of Engineering, 2013
- Foreign Member of the Russian Academy of Natural Sciences, 2013
- Poole and Kent Senior Teaching Award, University of Maryland, College Park, 2007
- Foundation for Science and Technology International Award, Gunma University, Japan, 2006
- Member of the International Academy of Refrigeration (Ukrainian Branch), 2003
- Fellow of the American Association for the Advancement of Science, 2002
- Fellow of the American Physical Society, 1998

== Bibliography (partial) ==
- M. A. Anisimov and T. J. Longo Mesoscopic Thermodynamics for Scientists and Engineers. Wiley. 2024. ISBN 978-1-394-24195-8.
- M. A. Anisimov, “50 years of breakthrough discoveries in fluid criticality”, Int. J. Thermophys. 32, 2001–2009 (2011).
- M. A. Anisimov Critical phenomena in liquids and liquid crystals. Gordon and Breach. 1991. ISBN 2-88124-806-3. OCLC 1046262995.
- M. A. Anisimov, V. A. Rabinovich, and V. V. Sychev, Thermodynamics of the Critical State of Individual Substances., English Edition: CRC Press, Boca Raton, 1995, 171 pages
