= Mattias Timander =

Swedish ice hockey player

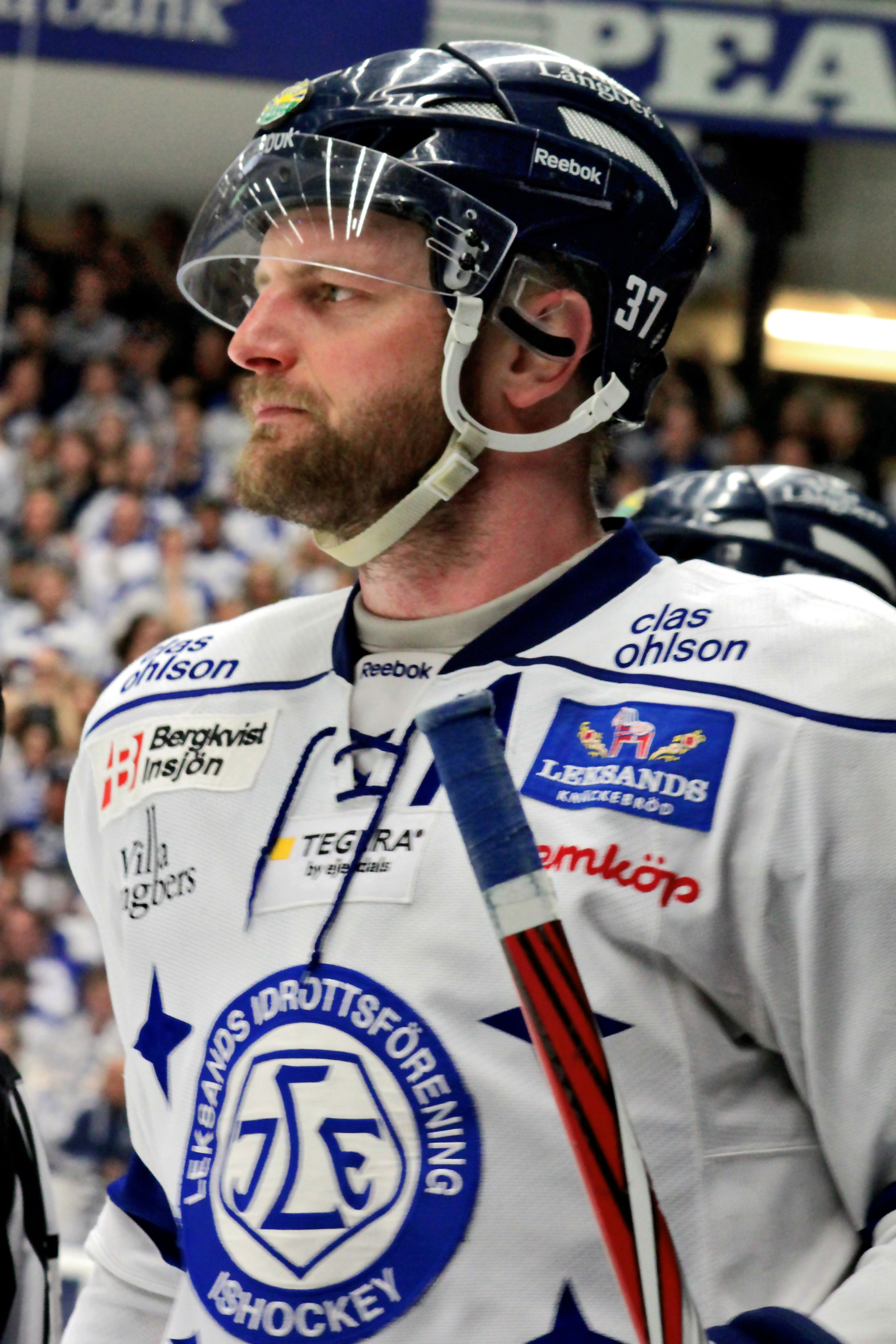
- Born: April 16, 1974 (age 52) Sollefteå, Sweden
- Height: 6 ft 2 in (188 cm)
- Weight: 236 lb (107 kg; 16 st 12 lb)
- Position: Defence
- Shot: Left
- Played for: Modo Hockey; Boston Bruins; Columbus Blue Jackets; New York Islanders; Philadelphia Flyers
- National team: Sweden
- NHL draft: 208th overall, 1992; Boston Bruins
- Playing career: 1993–2013

Mattias Erik Timander (born April 16, 1974) is a Swedish former professional ice hockey defenceman. He played eight seasons in the National Hockey League (NHL) for the Boston Bruins, Columbus Blue Jackets, New York Islanders and Philadelphia Flyers between 1996 and 2004. The rest of his career, which lasted from 1993 to 2013, was mainly spent in Sweden playing for Modo Hockey and Leksands IF.

== Playing career ==
Drafted 208th overall in the 1992 NHL entry draft by the Boston Bruins, Timander came over to North America prior to the 1996–97 season and split his first three seasons between Boston and the Bruins primary affiliate, the Providence Bruins. After spending the entire 1999–2000 season with Boston, Timander was taken by the Columbus Blue Jackets in the 2000 NHL Expansion Draft. He spent the next two seasons with Columbus and was traded to the New York Islanders for a 4th round draft pick (Jekabs Redlihs) prior to the 2002–03 season.

After playing in a career high 80 games in 2002–03, Timander was shifted between the Islanders and their American Hockey League affiliate, the Bridgeport Sound Tigers, in 2003–04. This led to him being traded to the Philadelphia Flyers for a 7th round draft pick (Chris Campoli) on January 22, 2004. He spent the rest of the season with the Flyers, playing in 34 regular season games and adding to what turned out to be a career high plus/minus rating (+13 w/Flyers, +2 w/Islanders, +15 overall). He also took part in all of his new team's 18 playoff games, coming one win short of a trip to the Stanley Cup Final.

He returned to Sweden in the off-season to play for Modo Hockey in the Elitserien where he left after the 2010–11 season.

On July 25, 2011, Timander signed a one-year contract (with an optional one-year extension) with the Leksands IF of the HockeyAllsvenskan. In May 2013, Timander officially announced his retirement.

== Career statistics ==
=== Regular season and playoffs ===
			Regular season					Playoffs
Season	Team	League	GP	G	A	Pts	PIM	GP	G	A	Pts	PIM
1990–91	Modo Hockey	SWE U20	—	—	—	—	—	—	—	—	—	—
1991–92	Modo Hockey	SWE U20	—	—	—	—	—	—	—	—	—	—
1992–93	Modo Hockey	SWE U20	4	0	0	0	0	—	—	—	—	—
1992–93	Modo Hockey	SEL	1	0	0	0	0	—	—	—	—	—
1992–93	Husums IF	SWE-2	27	4	9	13	22	—	—	—	—	—
1993–94	Modo Hockey	SWE U20	3	2	2	4	10	—	—	—	—	—
1993–94	Modo Hockey	SEL	23	2	2	4	6	11	2	0	2	10
1994–95	Modo Hockey	SEL	39	8	9	17	26	—	—	—	—	—
1995–96	Modo Hockey	SEL	37	4	11	15	34	7	1	1	2	8
1996–97	Providence Bruins	AHL	32	3	11	14	20	10	1	1	2	12
1996–97	Boston Bruins	NHL	41	1	8	9	14	—	—	—	—	—
1997–98	Providence Bruins	AHL	31	3	7	10	25	—	—	—	—	—
1997–98	Boston Bruins	NHL	23	1	1	2	6	—	—	—	—	—
1998–99	Providence Bruins	AHL	43	2	22	24	6	—	—	—	—	—
1998–99	Boston Bruins	NHL	22	0	6	6	10	4	1	1	2	2
1999–00	Boston Bruins	NHL	60	0	8	8	22	—	—	—	—	—
2000–01	Columbus Blue Jackets	NHL	76	2	9	11	24	—	—	—	—	—
2001–02	Columbus Blue Jackets	NHL	78	4	7	11	44	—	—	—	—	—
2002–03	New York Islanders	NHL	80	3	13	16	24	1	0	0	0	0
2003–04	Bridgeport Sound Tigers	AHL	35	2	6	8	12	—	—	—	—	—
2003–04	New York Islanders	NHL	5	1	1	2	2	—	—	—	—	—
2003–04	Philadelphia Flyers	NHL	34	1	4	5	19	18	2	4	6	6
2004–05	Modo Hockey	SEL	47	3	7	10	60	6	0	1	1	4
2005–06	Modo Hockey	SEL	48	5	9	14	48	5	0	1	1	4
2006–07	Modo Hockey	SEL	55	6	12	18	90	20	1	8	9	28
2007–08	Modo Hockey	SEL	23	1	6	7	16	3	1	1	2	4
2008–09	Modo Hockey	SEL	55	10	15	25	70	—	—	—	—	—
2009–10	Modo Hockey	SEL	49	5	20	25	46	—	—	—	—	—
2010–11	Modo Hockey	SEL	55	4	15	19	60	—	—	—	—	—
2011–12	Leksands IF	SWE-2	45	2	7	9	48	10	1	0	1	12
2012–13	Leksands IF	SWE-2	47	2	9	11	44	8	0	1	1	4
SEL totals			432	48	106	154	456	52	5	12	17	58
NHL totals			419	13	57	70	165	23	3	5	8	8

=== International ===
Medal record

Representing Sweden

Ice hockey

World Championships
Gold medal – first place	2006 Latvia	

World Junior Championships
Silver medal – second place	1994 Czech Republic	

Year	Team	Event	GP	G	A	Pts	PIM
1992	Sweden	EJC18	5	0	2	2	2
1994	Sweden	WJC	7	0	1	1	0
2006	Sweden	WC	9	0	3	3	6
Junior totals			12	0	3	3	2
Senior totals			9	0	3	3	6

== Awards and honours ==
Award	Year
SEL
Le Mat Trophy (Modo Hockey)	2006
