= Bert Robertsson =

Swedish ice hockey player and coach

- Born: June 30, 1974 (age 51) Södertälje, Sweden
- Height: 6 ft 2 in (188 cm)
- Weight: 216 lb (98 kg; 15 st 6 lb)
- Position: Defence
- Shot: Left
- Played for: Södertälje SK; Vancouver Canucks; Edmonton Oilers; New York Rangers; Ilves
- NHL draft: 254th overall, 1993; Vancouver Canucks
- Playing career: 1993–2008

Bert Erik Johan Robertsson (born June 30, 1974) is a Swedish former professional ice hockey defenceman and current assistant coach of Malmö Redhawks of the Swedish Hockey League (SHL). Robertsson played in the system of Södertälje SK in Sweden and was selected by the Vancouver Canucks in the 1993 NHL entry draft. Moving to North America in 1995, Robertsson played parts of four seasons in the National Hockey League (NHL) with the Canucks, Edmonton Oilers, and New York Rangers between 1997 and 2001, while mainly playing in the minor American Hockey League, before returning to Europe in 2002 and finishing his career there.

== Playing career ==
While his natural position was on the blueline, Robertsson spent much of his NHL career on the wing. While he was lacking in puck skills and offensive ability, his work ethic, in-your-face style of play, and solid defensive instincts made him a useful utility player at the NHL level.

Robertsson made his professional debut with the Canucks' AHL affiliate, the Syracuse Crunch, in the 1995–96 season. He made his NHL debut in the 1997–98 season with the Canucks, appearing in 30 games and recording 2 goals along with 4 assists. He spent most of the 1998–99 season on the Canucks' roster, appearing in 39 games and recording 2 goals and 4 points.

He moved to the Edmonton Oilers organization for the 1999–2000 season. With the Oilers, he appeared in a career-high 52 games - recording 4 assists - and also saw his first NHL playoff action, appearing in all five games of Edmonton's opening-round loss to the Dallas Stars. The Oilers left him unprotected in the 2000 NHL Expansion Draft, in which he was selected by the Columbus Blue Jackets.

After leaving Edmonton, Robertsson struggled to find a home in the NHL. In his final two seasons in North America, he moved through five NHL organizations (Columbus, the New York Rangers, the Nashville Predators, the Mighty Ducks of Anaheim, and the Pittsburgh Penguins) and six minor-pro teams. During this time he appeared in only two NHL games: in 2000–01 with the Rangers.

Robertsson would return to Europe for the 2002–03 season, joining Ilves of Finland's SM-liiga. He then went home to Sweden, re-joining Södertälje SK of the Swedish Elite League in 2003. After two more seasons there, he retired in 2005.

He finished his NHL career with 4 goals and 10 assists in 123 career games, along with 75 penalty minutes.

== Coaching career ==
Robertsson immediately transitioned to a coaching capacity, securing an assistant coaching role with Almtuna IS in the HockeyAllsvenskan. He later moved to top-tier club, Skellefteå AIK, initially as an assistant before securing the head coach role and claiming the Le Mat trophy in the 2012–13 season.

After two championships in his eight-year tenure coaching within Skellefteå AIK, Robertsson left the club to assume the head coaching role with Linköpings HC for the 2019–20 season. He was signed to a three-year contract on 10 April 2019.

== Career statistics ==
=== Regular season and playoffs ===
			Regular season					Playoffs
Season	Team	League	GP	G	A	Pts	PIM	GP	G	A	Pts	PIM
1992–93	Södertälje SK J20	SWE-Jr	12	1	5	6	20	—	—	—	—	—
1992–93	Södertälje SK	SWE-2	23	2	1	3	24	2	0	0	0	0
1993–94	Södertälje SK	SWE-2	28	0	1	1	12	1	0	0	0	0
1994–95	Södertälje SK J20	SWE-Jr	11	2	3	5	4	—	—	—	—	—
1994–95	Södertälje SK	SWE-2	23	1	2	3	24	3	0	1	1	2
1995–96	Syracuse Crunch	AHL	65	1	7	8	109	16	0	1	1	26
1996–97	Syracuse Crunch	AHL	80	4	9	13	132	3	1	0	1	4
1997–98	Vancouver Canucks	NHL	30	2	4	6	10	—	—	—	—	—
1997–98	Syracuse Crunch	AHL	42	5	9	14	87	3	0	0	0	6
1998–99	Vancouver Canucks	NHL	39	2	2	4	13	—	—	—	—	—
1998–99	Syracuse Crunch	AHL	8	1	0	1	21	—	—	—	—	—
1999–00	Edmonton Oilers	NHL	52	0	4	4	34	5	0	0	0	0
1999–00	Hamilton Bulldogs	AHL	6	0	3	3	12	—	—	—	—	—
2000–01	New York Rangers	NHL	2	0	0	0	4	—	—	—	—	—
2000–01	Hartford Wolf Pack	AHL	27	7	5	12	27	—	—	—	—	—
2000–01	Houston Aeros	IHL	14	0	0	0	26	—	—	—	—	—
2000–01	Milwaukee Admirals	IHL	10	0	0	0	0	5	0	1	1	2
2001–02	Cincinnati Mighty Ducks	AHL	16	0	2	2	39	—	—	—	—	—
2001–02	Wilkes-Barre/Scranton Penguins	AHL	13	0	0	0	15	—	—	—	—	—
2001–02	Milwaukee Admirals	AHL	14	0	1	1	18	—	—	—	—	—
2002–03	Ilves	FIN	54	1	4	5	111	—	—	—	—	—
2003–04	Södertälje SK	SWE	48	2	2	4	109	—	—	—	—	—
2004–05	Södertälje SK	SWE	42	0	0	0	24	—	—	—	—	—
2006–07	Undici	SWE-4	12	4	13	17	16	—	—	—	—	—
2007–08	Undici	SWE-3	11	3	12	15	18	—	—	—	—	—
AHL totals			271	18	36	54	460	22	1	1	2	36
NHL totals			123	4	10	14	61	5	0	0	0	0
