= Geoff Sanderson =

Canadian ice hockey player

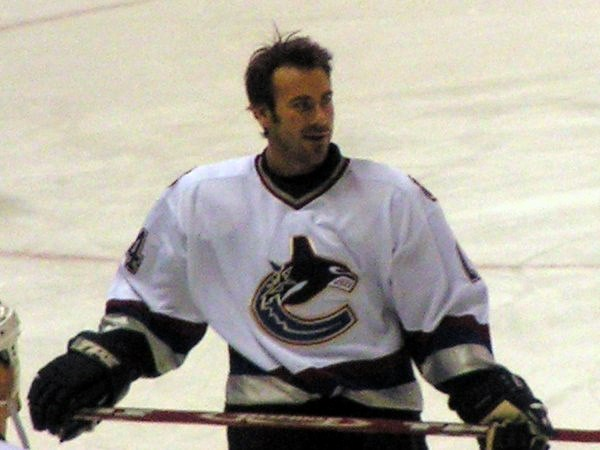
- Sanderson with the Vancouver Canucks in 2004
- Born: February 1, 1972 (age 54) Hay River, Northwest Territories, Canada
- Height: 6 ft 0 in (183 cm)
- Weight: 190 lb (86 kg; 13 st 8 lb)
- Position: Left wing
- Shot: Left
- Played for: Hartford Whalers; Carolina Hurricanes; Vancouver Canucks; Buffalo Sabres; Columbus Blue Jackets; Phoenix Coyotes; Philadelphia Flyers; Edmonton Oilers
- National team: Canada
- NHL draft: 36th overall, 1990; Hartford Whalers
- Playing career: 1991–2008

Geoffrey M. Sanderson (born February 1, 1972) is a Canadian former professional ice hockey left winger, most notably for the Hartford Whalers and Columbus Blue Jackets of the National Hockey League (NHL).

== Playing career ==
Drafted by the Hartford Whalers 36th overall in the 1990 NHL entry draft, Sanderson made his NHL debut at the tail end of the 1990–91 season with the Whalers. He was on the roster for their first round playoff loss, and was then sent to bolster their American Hockey League affiliate, the Springfield Indians, who went on to win the Calder Cup. Sanderson played in 64 games in his first full season for the club in 1991–92. In the first round of that year's playoffs, Hartford was trailing the Montreal Canadiens 2–1 late in the second period of game seven, when Sanderson scored his first career playoff goal to tie the game. The Canadiens eventually won in double overtime. Over his next five years in Hartford, Sanderson scored more than 30 goals every season with the exception of the 1994–95 lockout season, but the Whalers missed the playoffs each year.

Sanderson remained with the franchise as they moved from Hartford and become the Carolina Hurricanes, but halfway through the 1997-98 NHL season he was traded to the Vancouver Canucks, and shortly thereafter to the Buffalo Sabres in a separate trade. In Buffalo he did not receive the same level of ice time he had in Hartford, but he experienced the most playoff time of his career. In the first round, the Sabres defeated the Philadelphia Flyers 4–1, to set up a quarterfinal matchup with the Canadiens. In game one, Sanderson scored twice, including the game-winning overtime goal, in front of the home crowd to give the Sabres a 1–0 series lead. Buffalo also won game two, and Sanderson scored a pivotal goal in game three, which was won by the Sabres in double overtime. The Sabres completed the sweep, but then lost to the Washington Capitals 4 games to 2 in the Eastern Conference Finals.

During the 1998-99 NHL season the Sabres continued their winning ways and Sanderson continued to put up respectable third line numbers. After the Sabres swept the Ottawa Senators in the first round of the playoffs, and then dispatched the Boston Bruins in six games, they once again advanced to the Eastern Conference Finals, this time against their cross-lake rivals, the Toronto Maple Leafs. In game one, Sanderson scored his first goal of the playoffs, which turned out to be the game winner as the Sabres won 5–4. The Leafs won game two, and the Sabres won game three. In game four, Buffalo started off strong building a 3–0 lead following second period goals by Brian Holzinger and Rob Ray. Just twenty-two seconds after Ray's goal, Sanderson made it 4–0, and then made it 5–0 with another goal ten minutes later. The Sabres went on to win the series, and advanced to the Stanley Cup Final for the second time in team history. Facing the Dallas Stars, Buffalo took game one on the road in overtime, but Dallas fought back and won the next two games. In game four in Buffalo, Sanderson beat Ed Belfour to score the game's first goal halfway through the first period, and Buffalo eventually won the game, sending the series back to Dallas tied 2–2. Dallas won game five, and then won game six of the 1999 Stanley Cup Final – and the Stanley Cup as a result – on a controversial Brett Hull triple overtime goal.

Sanderson was selected by the Columbus Blue Jackets in the 2000 NHL Expansion Draft, and scored 30-plus goals in 2000–01 and 2002–03. He was the first Blue Jacket to score a hat trick. He returned to Vancouver at the trade deadline in 2003–04. With the Canucks Sanderson played his final postseason games in 2004, scoring a goal in Canucks' first round loss to the Calgary Flames.

He was reclaimed by Columbus off waivers in the off-season, and Sanderson was traded two games into the 2005–06 season to the Phoenix Coyotes. After scoring 25 goals in 75 games with Phoenix, Sanderson signed a two-year contract with the Philadelphia Flyers in the off-season.

A disappointing year with Philadelphia resulted in Sanderson being traded to Edmonton with Joni Pitkanen in exchange for Joffrey Lupul and former Oilers captain Jason Smith. Sanderson scored two goals against Philadelphia the first time he played against his former team. Following the 2008 season, Edmonton declined to tender Sanderson a contract, ending his professional playing career.

Sanderson ended his NHL career with a total of exactly 700 points, making him the most successful hockey player to come out of the Northwest Territories.

== Retirement ==
Sanderson accepted a developmental coaching and scouting role within the New York Islanders organization to begin the 2010–11 season. After his second season with the Islanders, Sanderson opted to step away from his position citing family reasons, and a similar lifestyle to his playing days. Sanderson formed and currently runs an oil and gas rental equipment company, Breakaway Matting, alongside former teammate Brendan Morrison.

== Personal life ==
Sanderson is one of few NHL players to have been born in the Northwest Territories (Hay River) and spent his early years in Pine Point, Northwest Territories, while his father worked as a pharmacist in the now defunct town. Geoff then spent his junior high school years in High Level, Alberta. His dad, Aaron, owned the only pharmacy in High Level and would close the store every Saturday at 5:55 pm so he could be at home by 6 pm to watch Hockey Night in Canada with his boys. As a teenager, Geoff relocated with his family to St. Albert, Alberta, for Grades 10–12. Sanderson currently resides in Calgary, Alberta, with his wife Ellen and three sons. His son Jake Sanderson is a defenceman for the Ottawa Senators.

In 2013, Sanderson coached his oldest son's peewee team, the Springbank Whalers of Calgary.

He has two cousins who have also played in the NHL: Wade Brookbank, who most recently played for the Rockford IceHogs, and Sheldon Brookbank, who was a former assistant coach for the Chicago Blackhawks.

== Career statistics ==
=== Regular season and playoffs ===
			Regular season					Playoffs
Season	Team	League	GP	G	A	Pts	PIM	GP	G	A	Pts	PIM
1987–88	St. Albert Royals AAA	AMHL	45	65	55	120	175	—	—	—	—	—
1988–89	Swift Current Broncos	WHL	58	17	11	28	16	12	3	5	8	6
1989–90	Swift Current Broncos	WHL	70	32	62	94	56	4	1	4	5	8
1990–91	Swift Current Broncos	WHL	70	62	50	112	57	3	1	2	3	4
1990–91	Hartford Whalers	NHL	2	1	0	1	0	3	0	0	0	0
1990–91	Springfield Indians	AHL	—	—	—	—	—	1	0	0	0	2
1991–92	Hartford Whalers	NHL	64	13	18	31	18	7	1	0	1	2
1992–93	Hartford Whalers	NHL	82	46	43	89	28	—	—	—	—	—
1993–94	Hartford Whalers	NHL	82	41	26	67	42	—	—	—	—	—
1994–95	HPK	SM-l	12	6	4	10	24	—	—	—	—	—
1994–95	Hartford Whalers	NHL	46	18	14	32	24	—	—	—	—	—
1995–96	Hartford Whalers	NHL	81	34	31	65	40	—	—	—	—	—
1996–97	Hartford Whalers	NHL	82	36	31	67	29	—	—	—	—	—
1997–98	Carolina Hurricanes	NHL	40	7	10	17	14	—	—	—	—	—
1997–98	Vancouver Canucks	NHL	9	0	3	3	4	—	—	—	—	—
1997–98	Buffalo Sabres	NHL	26	4	5	9	20	14	3	1	4	4
1998–99	Buffalo Sabres	NHL	75	12	18	30	22	19	4	6	10	14
1999–2000	Buffalo Sabres	NHL	67	13	13	26	22	5	0	2	2	8
2000–01	Columbus Blue Jackets	NHL	68	30	26	56	46	—	—	—	—	—
2001–02	Columbus Blue Jackets	NHL	42	11	5	16	12	—	—	—	—	—
2002–03	Columbus Blue Jackets	NHL	82	34	33	67	34	—	—	—	—	—
2003–04	Columbus Blue Jackets	NHL	67	13	16	29	34	—	—	—	—	—
2003–04	Vancouver Canucks	NHL	13	3	4	7	4	7	1	1	2	4
2004–05	Genève–Servette HC	NLA	9	4	1	5	29	—	—	—	—	—
2005–06	Columbus Blue Jackets	NHL	2	0	0	0	0	—	—	—	—	—
2005–06	Phoenix Coyotes	NHL	75	25	21	46	58	—	—	—	—	—
2006–07	Philadelphia Flyers	NHL	58	11	18	29	44	—	—	—	—	—
2007–08	Edmonton Oilers	NHL	41	3	10	13	16	—	—	—	—	—
NHL totals			1,104	355	345	700	511	55	9	10	19	32

=== International ===
Medal record

Representing Canada

World Championships
Gold medal – first place	1994 Milan	
Gold medal – first place	1997 Helsinki	

Year	Team	Event	Result	GP	G	A	Pts	PIM
1993	Canada	WC	4th	8	3	3	6	2
1994	Canada	WC	1st place, gold medalist(s)	8	4	2	6	8
1997	Canada	WC	1st place, gold medalist(s)	11	3	2	5	2
Senior totals				27	10	7	17	12

== Awards and honours ==
Award	Year
CHL
WHL Champions (Swift Current Broncos)	1989
Memorial Cup	1989
AHL
Calder Cup (Springfield Indians)	1991
NHL
All-Star Game	1994, 1997

== See also ==
- List of NHL players with 1,000 games played
