= Frédéric Chabot =

Canadian ice hockey player (born 1968)

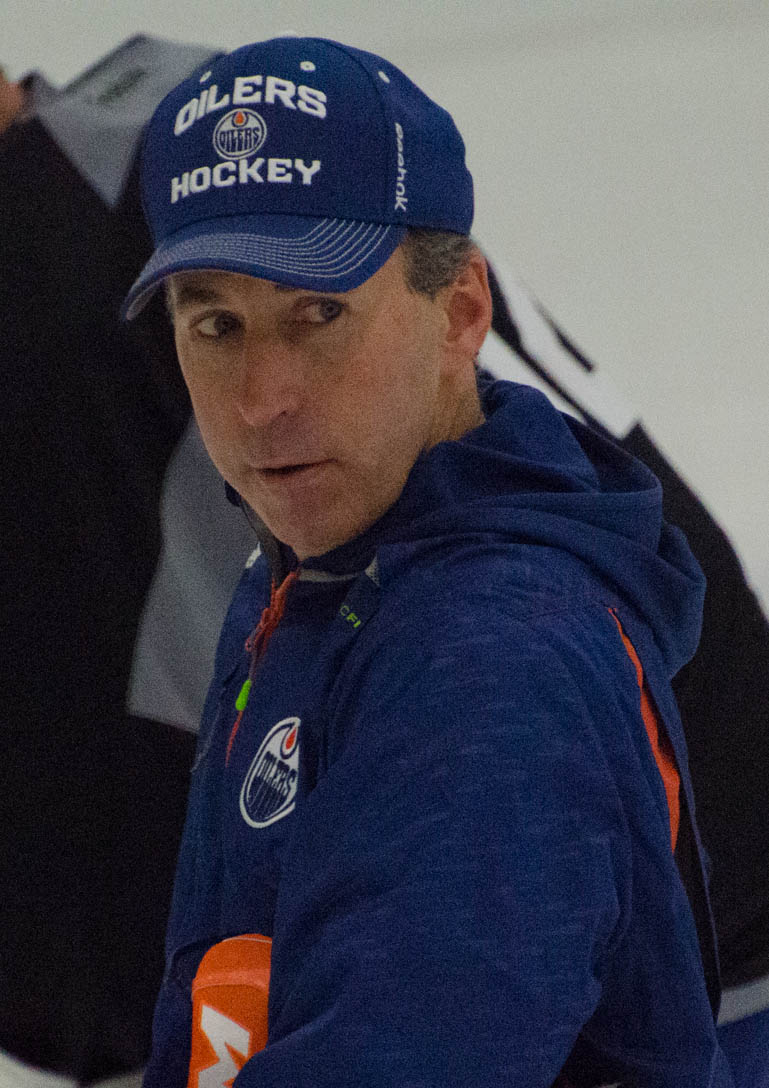
- Chabot at the 2014 Edmonton Oilers training camp
- Born: February 12, 1968 (age 58) Hébertville-Station, Quebec, Canada
- Height: 5 ft 11 in (180 cm)
- Weight: 187 lb (85 kg; 13 st 5 lb)
- Position: Goaltender
- Caught: Left
- Played for: Montreal Canadiens; Philadelphia Flyers; Los Angeles Kings; Nürnberg Ice Tigers; Vienna Capitals; Adler Mannheim
- NHL draft: 192nd overall, 1986; New Jersey Devils
- Playing career: 1989–2006

Joseph Leopold Louis Marie Frédéric Chabot (born February 12, 1968) is a Canadian ice hockey coach and former goaltender who played parts of five seasons in the National Hockey League (NHL) for the Montreal Canadiens, Philadelphia Flyers and Los Angeles Kings from 1991 to 1999. The rest of his career, which lasted from 1989 to 2006, was spent in the minor leagues and then in Europe. He is currently the Goaltending Coach for the Minnesota Wild.

== Playing career ==
Chabot played for the International Hockey League's Cincinnati Cyclones. He also played for the Houston Aeros, helping them win the Turner Cup in 1999. He also played a portion of his career for the National Hockey League's Los Angeles Kings. He was also on the roster for the 1998–99 expansion Nashville Predators. He won the Aldege "Baz" Bastien Memorial Award as the best goaltender in the American Hockey League in the 1993–94 season as a member of the Hershey Bears.

Chabot was available in a record five NHL Expansion Drafts: 1991, 1992, 1993, 1998, and 2000. He was selected in three (1992, 1998, and 2000), also a record.

== Coaching career ==
On July 6, 2009, Chabot was named the Goaltending Consultant for the Edmonton Oilers.

On November 24, 2014, Chabot was relieved of his duties as the Goaltender Consultant for the Edmonton Oilers after being replaced by Dustin Schwartz. He was shortly thereafter hired by the Minnesota Wild as their Goaltending Development Coach. On August 26, 2020, Chabot was promoted by the Wild to be their Goaltending Coach.

== Career statistics ==
=== Regular season and playoffs ===
			Regular season									Playoffs
Season	Team	League	GP	W	L	T	MIN	GA	SO	GAA	SV%	GP	W	L	MIN	GA	SO	GAA	SV%
1985–86	Sainte-Foy Gouverneurs	QMAAA	34	25	9	0	2038	139	0	3.90	—	7	6	1	320	30	0	4.29	—
1986–87	Drummondville Voltigeurs	QMJHL	62	31	29	0	3508	293	1	5.01	.847	8	2	6	481	40	0	4.99	.853
1987–88	Drummondville Voltigeurs	QMJHL	58	27	24	4	3276	237	1	4.34	.873	16	10	6	1019	56	1	3.30	.898
1987–88	Drummondville Voltigeurs	M-Cup	—	—	—	—	—	—	—	—	—	3	0	3	158	18	0	6.86	—
1988–89	Moose Jaw Warriors	WHL	26	—	—	—	1385	114	1	4.94	—	—	—	—	—	—	—	—	—
1988–89	Prince Albert Raiders	WHL	28	—	—	—	1572	88	1	3.36	—	4	1	1	199	16	0	4.82	.814
1989–80	Sherbrooke Canadiens	AHL	2	1	1	0	119	8	0	4.03	.867	—	—	—	—	—	—	—	—
1989–80	Fort Wayne Komets	IHL	23	6	13	3	1208	87	1	4.32	—	—	—	—	—	—	—	—	—
1990–91	Montreal Canadiens	NHL	3	0	0	1	109	6	0	3.32	.867	—	—	—	—	—	—	—	—
1990–91	Fredericton Canadiens	AHL	35	9	15	5	1800	122	0	4.07	.874	—	—	—	—	—	—	—	—
1991–92	Fredericton Canadiens	AHL	30	17	9	4	1761	79	2	2.69	.906	7	3	4	457	20	0	2.63	.900
1991–92	Winston-Salem Thunderbirds	ECHL	24	15	7	2	1449	71	0	2.94	.902	—	—	—	—	—	—	—	—
1992–93	Montreal Canadiens	NHL	1	0	0	0	40	1	0	1.50	.947	—	—	—	—	—	—	—	—
1992–93	Fredericton Canadiens	AHL	45	22	17	4	2544	141	0	3.33	.901	4	1	3	261	16	0	3.68	—
1993–94	Montreal Canadiens	NHL	1	0	1	0	60	5	0	5.00	.792	—	—	—	—	—	—	—	—
1993–94	Fredericton Canadiens	AHL	3	0	1	1	143	12	0	5.03	.818	—	—	—	—	—	—	—	—
1993–94	Las Vegas Thunder	IHL	2	1	1	0	110	5	0	2.72	.919	—	—	—	—	—	—	—	—
1993–94	Philadelphia Flyers	NHL	4	0	1	1	71	5	0	4.26	.875	—	—	—	—	—	—	—	—
1993–94	Hershey Bears	AHL	28	13	5	6	1464	63	2	2.58	.921	11	7	4	665	32	0	2.89	.898
1994–95	Cincinnati Cyclones	IHL	48	25	12	7	2622	128	1	2.93	.912	5	3	2	326	16	0	2.94	.918
1995–96	Cincinnati Cyclones	IHL	38	23	9	4	2147	88	3	2.46	.921	14	9	5	854	37	1	2.60	.916
1996–97	Houston Aeros	IHL	72	39	26	7	4265	180	7	2.53	.920	13	8	5	777	34	2	2.63	.920
1997–98	Los Angeles Kings	NHL	12	3	3	2	554	29	0	3.14	.891	—	—	—	—	—	—	—	—
1997–98	Houston Aeros	IHL	22	12	7	2	1237	46	1	2.23	.921	4	1	3	238	11	0	2.77	.908
1998–99	Montreal Canadiens	NHL	11	1	3	0	430	16	0	2.23	.915	—	—	—	—	—	—	—	—
1998–99	Houston Aeros	IHL	21	16	4	1	1259	49	3	2.34	.916	—	—	—	—	—	—	—	—
1999–00	Houston Aeros	IHL	62	36	19	7	3695	131	4	2.13	.920	11	6	5	658	20	3	1.82	.932
2000–01	Houston Aeros	IHL	47	23	16	5	2705	119	3	2.64	.914	7	3	4	482	15	0	1.87	.933
2001–02	Nürnberg Ice Tigers	DEL	29	—	—	—	1697	56	4	1.98	.932	3	0	3	178	9	0	3.03	—
2002–03	Nürnberg Ice Tigers	DEL	25	—	—	—	1461	44	3	1.81	.945	5	—	—	298	17	0	3.41	.895
2003–04	Nürnberg Ice Tigers	DEL	35	—	—	—	1889	72	3	2.29	.914	5	—	—	290	12	0	2.48	.905
2004–05	Vienna Capitals	EBEL	53	—	—	—	3166	142	2	2.69	.914	10	7	3	—	—	0	2.39	.934
2005–06	Adler Mannheim	DEL	26	—	—	—	1359	61	2	2.69	.914	—	—	—	—	—	—	—	—
NHL totals			32	4	8	4	1263	62	0	2.95	.894	—	—	—	—	—	—	—	—

== Awards ==
- WHL East First All-Star Team – 1989

Awards and achievements
Preceded by Corey Hirsch	Aldege "Baz" Bastien Memorial Award; 1993–94	Succeeded by Jim Carey
