= Kevyn Adams =

American ice hockey player and executive

- Born: October 8, 1974 (age 52) Washington, D.C., U.S.
- Height: 6 ft 1 in (185 cm)
- Weight: 200 lb (91 kg; 14 st 4 lb)
- Position: Center
- Shot: Right
- Played for: Toronto Maple Leafs; Columbus Blue Jackets; Florida Panthers; Carolina Hurricanes; Phoenix Coyotes; Chicago Blackhawks; DEG Metro Stars
- National team: United States
- NHL draft: 25th overall, 1993; Boston Bruins
- Playing career: 1996–2008

Kevyn William Adams (born October 8, 1974) is an American former professional ice hockey center and executive who currently works as a senior advisor for the Boston Bruins of the National Hockey League (NHL). During his career, Adams played for the Toronto Maple Leafs, Columbus Blue Jackets, Florida Panthers, Carolina Hurricanes, Phoenix Coyotes and the Chicago Blackhawks. After his playing career, Adams served as both an associate coach and general manager for the Buffalo Sabres.

== Playing career ==
=== Amateur ===
Adams grew up in Clarence, New York and played his youth hockey for the Wheatfield Blades organization at a rink then known as Sabreland, where the Buffalo Sabres used to practice. Adams played collegiately for Miami University and was drafted in the 1st round, 25th overall by the Boston Bruins in the 1993 NHL entry draft. He would choose to spend the duration of his rookie contract playing for Miami University, never playing a game for Boston. During the 1996–97 season, Adams would play for the Grand Rapids Griffins in the International Hockey League (IHL) where he would score 47 points in 82 games.

=== Toronto Maple Leafs ===
On August 7, 1997, Adams signed with the Toronto Maple Leafs in free agency. He spent his entire tenure between the Toronto Maple Leafs and their American Hockey League (AHL) affiliate the St. John's Maple Leafs, spending most of his time in the AHL. Adams made his NHL debut on October 10, 1997 in a 4–1 loss to the Washington Capitals. It wasn't until the 1999–2000 season when Adams started playing regularly at the NHL level, playing 52 games and scoring 14 points. On January 3, 2000, Adams scored his first NHL goal against goaltender Dwayne Roloson in a 6–2 win against the Buffalo Sabres.

=== Columbus Blue Jackets ===
Adams was drafted by the Columbus Blue Jackets in the 2000 NHL expansion draft. He would score his first 2 goals with the team on October 12, 2000 in a 3–2 win over the Calgary Flames. Adams would score 22 points in 66 games with the Blue Jackets before being traded at the trade deadline to the Florida Panthers alongside a 4th round pick in the 2001 NHL entry draft (Mike Woodford) in exchange for Ray Whitney and future considerations.

=== Florida Panthers ===
After arriving in Florida, Adams would score his first 2 goals with the team on March 21, 2001 in a 3–1 victory over the Toronto Maple Leafs, his former team. The following season Adams would regress slightly, scoring 12 points in 44 games. On January 16, 2002, Adams would be traded alongside Bret Hedican and Tomáš Malec to the Carolina Hurricanes for Sandis Ozoliņš and Byron Ritchie.

=== Carolina Hurricanes ===
Adams would struggle at first with Carolina, scoring only 5 points in 33 games. He would bounce back in the next two seasons, scoring 20 points during the 2002–03 season and 26 points during the 2003–04 season. The Hurricanes would also make a deep playoff run during this time, making it all the way to the 2002 Stanley Cup Finals against the Detroit Red Wings. During the playoffs, Adams would score a single point in 23 games, which was a single goal in game 6 against the Montreal Canadiens. During the 2004–05 NHL lockout, Adams would play for the DEG Metro Stars in Düsseldorf, Germany in the Deutsche Eishockey Liga (DEL).

Adams would return to the Hurricanes in the 2005–06 season, signing a two-year deal with the team and being assigned as an alternate captain behind Rod Brind'Amour. He would score two hat tricks in the span of one month, the first being against the New York Rangers on November 17, 2005, and the second being against the Mighty Ducks of Anaheim on December 6, 2005. The Carolina Hurricanes would make the playoffs, defeating the Montreal Canadiens, New Jersey Devils, and Buffalo Sabres to secure their spot in the Stanley Cup Finals. Carolina would face the Edmonton Oilers in a series that would go to a game 7, which the Hurricanes would win, giving Adams his first Stanley Cup victory. Despite being an alternate captain and playing in every game in the postseason, Adams would fail to score a single point in the playoffs. Adams would continue to struggle, as during the 2006–07 season, he would only score 4 points in 35 games before being traded on January 8, 2007 to the Phoenix Coyotes in exchange for Dennis Seidenberg.

=== Phoenix Coyotes ===
Adams would finish the season with Phoenix, scoring 8 points in 33 games on the team. However, his stint with the team would be brief, as before the 2007–08 season began, Adams would be traded to the Chicago Blackhawks in exchange for Radim Vrbata.

=== Chicago Blackhawks and retirement ===
Adams wouldn't do much on the Blackhawks, missing most of the season after tearing his ACL. He would only play 27 games throughout the season, scoring only 2 points in that time. Despite being invited to training camp before the 2008–09 season began, Adams would be released by the Blackhawks on October 7, 2008. Months later on January 6, 2009, Adams announced his retirement to become a player–agent.

== Coaching and management career ==
=== Buffalo Sabres (2011-2025) ===
On August 3, 2011, Adams was named assistant coach of the Buffalo Sabres. He was fired on May 9, 2013, two days after the Sabres named Ron Rolston as their new head coach. Adams was named the Senior Vice President of Business Administration for the Sabres in 2019. On June 16, 2020, he was named the team's general manager, replacing the recently fired Jason Botterill. On March 25, 2021, Adams filled in as head coach of the Sabres when head coach Don Granato and assistant coach Matt Ellis entered the NHL's COVID protocol. The Sabres lost the game, 4–0, against the Pittsburgh Penguins, extending the Sabres winless streak to sixteen games.

On July 24, 2021, Adams traded top-line forward Sam Reinhart to the Florida Panthers in exchange for the Panthers' first-round pick in 2022 (Jiří Kulich) and prospect goalie Devon Levi. That same year on November 5, 2021, following disagreements with Jack Eichel over how to medically treat the herniated disk in Eichel's neck, Adams traded Eichel to the Vegas Golden Knights in return for Peyton Krebs, Alex Tuch, a top-10 protected first-round pick in the 2022 NHL Draft (Noah Ostlund), and a second-round pick in the 2023 NHL Draft (traded for Jordan Greenway).

Adams was fired on December 15, 2025, after the Sabres began the season 14–14–4. The Sabres failed to make the playoffs in each of the five full seasons he was GM, extending the longest playoff drought in NHL history, dating back to 2011. The team under his leadership had a 178-196-42 record and 0.478 points percentage, and never finished above 20th in the league standings in any season. He was replaced by Jarmo Kekäläinen, who had been hired by Buffalo as a senior advisor in May 2025.

=== Boston Bruins (2026-present) ===
On July 14, 2026, Adams was hired by the Boston Bruins as senior advisor to general manager Don Sweeney.

== Personal life ==
Adams was the second player in NHL history, after Bill Nyrop, to be born in the District of Columbia. Despite being born in the D.C. area, Adams grew up in Clarence, New York, and keeps a second home in Bemus Point, New York. He was inducted into the Miami University Athletics Hall of Fame in 2011.

== Career statistics ==
=== Regular season and playoffs ===
			Regular season					Playoffs
Season	Team	League	GP	G	A	Pts	PIM	GP	G	A	Pts	PIM
1990–91	Niagara Scenics	NAHL	55	17	20	37	24	—	—	—	—	—
1991–92	Niagara Scenics	NAHL	40	25	33	58	51	—	—	—	—	—
1992–93	Miami Redskins	CCHA	40	17	15	32	18	—	—	—	—	—
1993–94	Miami Redskins	CCHA	36	15	28	43	24	—	—	—	—	—
1994–95	Miami Redskins	CCHA	38	20	29	49	30	—	—	—	—	—
1995–96	Miami Redskins	CCHA	36	17	30	47	30	—	—	—	—	—
1996–97	Grand Rapids Griffins	IHL	82	22	25	47	47	5	1	1	2	4
1997–98	Toronto Maple Leafs	NHL	5	0	0	0	7	—	—	—	—	—
1997–98	St. John's Maple Leafs	AHL	59	17	20	37	99	4	0	0	0	4
1998–99	Toronto Maple Leafs	NHL	1	0	0	0	7	7	0	2	2	14
1998–99	St. John's Maple Leafs	AHL	80	15	35	50	85	5	2	0	2	4
1999–00	St. John's Maple Leafs	AHL	23	6	11	17	24	—	—	—	—	—
1999–00	Toronto Maple Leafs	NHL	52	5	8	13	39	12	1	0	1	7
2000–01	Columbus Blue Jackets	NHL	66	8	12	20	52	—	—	—	—	—
2000–01	Florida Panthers	NHL	12	3	6	9	2	—	—	—	—	—
2001–02	Florida Panthers	NHL	44	4	8	12	28	—	—	—	—	—
2001–02	Carolina Hurricanes	NHL	33	2	3	5	15	23	1	0	1	4
2002–03	Carolina Hurricanes	NHL	77	9	9	18	57	—	—	—	—	—
2003–04	Carolina Hurricanes	NHL	73	10	12	22	43	—	—	—	—	—
2004–05	DEG Metro Stars	DEL	9	1	2	3	4	—	—	—	—	—
2005–06	Carolina Hurricanes	NHL	82	15	8	23	36	25	0	0	0	14
2006–07	Carolina Hurricanes	NHL	35	2	2	4	17	—	—	—	—	—
2006–07	Phoenix Coyotes	NHL	33	1	7	8	8	—	—	—	—	—
2007–08	Chicago Blackhawks	NHL	27	0	2	2	13	—	—	—	—	—
NHL totals			540	59	77	136	317	67	2	2	4	39
AHL totals			144	38	67	105	208	9	2	0	2	8

=== International ===
Year	Team	Event	Result	GP	G	A	Pts	PIM
1994	United States	WJC	6th	7	4	3	7	2
2005	United States	WC	6th	1	0	0	0	0
Junior totals				7	4	3	7	2
Senior totals				1	0	0	0	0

== Awards and honors ==
Award	Year
All–CCHA Second Team	1994–95
Stanley Cup champion	2006

Awards and achievements
Preceded by Dmitri Kvartalnov	Boston Bruins first-round draft pick 1993	Succeeded by Evgeni Ryabchikov
Sporting positions
Preceded by Jason Botterill	General Manager of the Buffalo Sabres; 2020–2025	Succeeded by Jarmo Kekalainen
