= Artem Anisimov (ice hockey, born 1976) =

Russian ice hockey player (born 1976)

Artyom Anisimov
- Born: July 27, 1976 (age 49) Kazan, Soviet Union
- Height: 6 ft 1 in (185 cm)
- Weight: 212 lb (96 kg; 15 st 2 lb)
- Position: Defense
- Shot: Left
- Played for: HC Ak Bars Kazan; HC Amur Khabarovsk; Salavat Yulaev Ufa; Molot-Prikamye Perm; HC Khimik Voskresensk
- NHL draft: 62nd overall, 1994; Philadelphia Flyers
- Playing career: 1993–2008

Artyom Vyacheslavovich Anisimov (Russian: Артём Анисимов; born July 27, 1976) is a Russian former professional ice hockey defenseman who played fifteen seasons in the Russian Superleague (RSL) and Vysshaya Liga. Anisimov was drafted in the third round, 62nd overall, of the 1994 NHL entry draft by the Philadelphia Flyers. He was also selected in the 2000 NHL Expansion Draft by the Minnesota Wild.

== Awards and honors ==
Award	Year
Russian Superleague
Champion (Ak Bars Kazan)	1998
