= Tanya Anisimova =

American cellist and composer

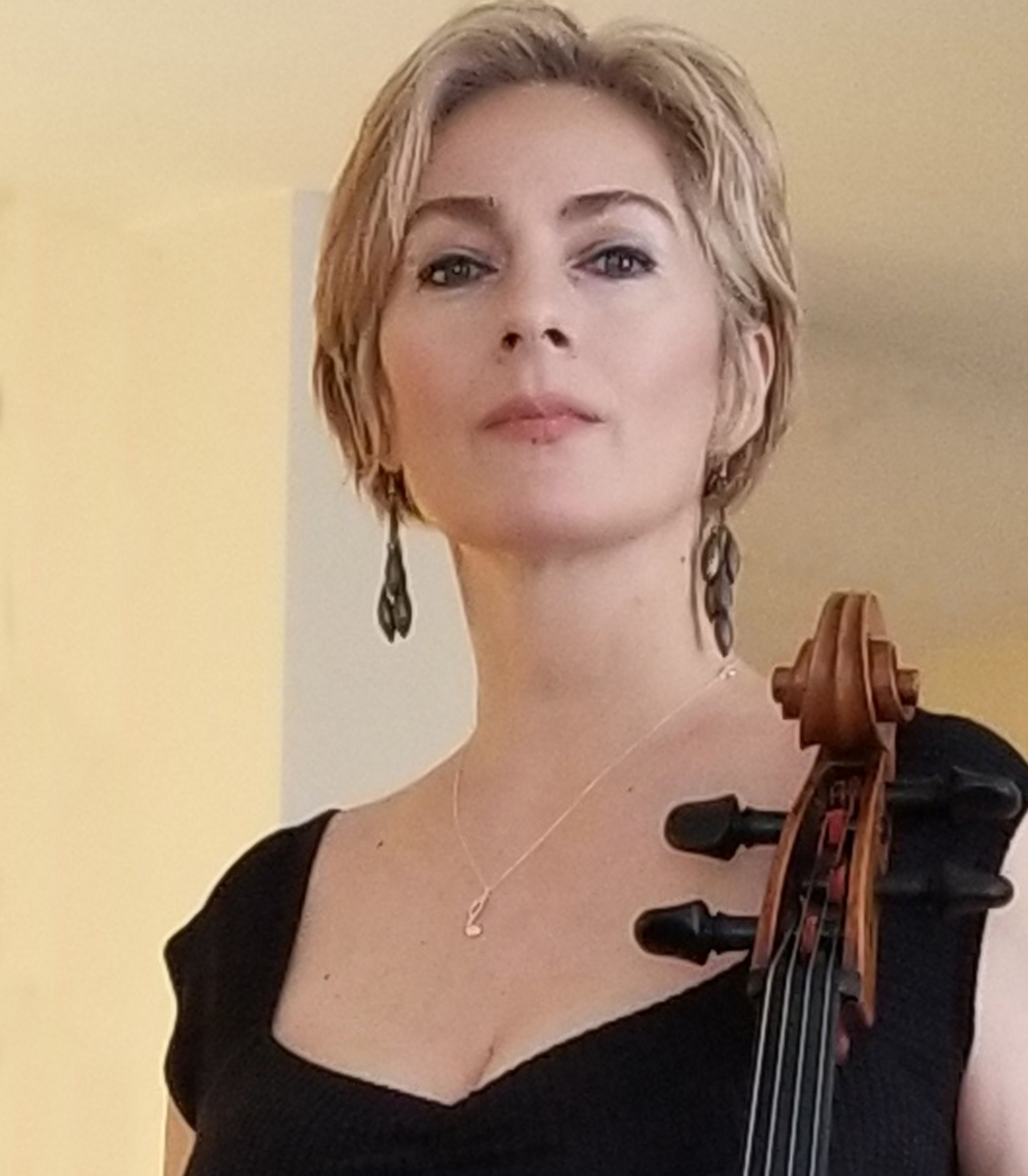
- Tanya Anisimova
- Born: February 15, 1966; Grozny, Chechnya, USSR
- Occupations: Cellist; Composer
- Spouse: Alexander Anufriev (m. 1999)
- Website: www.tanyaanisimova.com

Tanya Anisimova (born February 15, 1966) is an American cellist and composer of Russian descent.

Tanya Anisimova was born in the Chechen city of Grozny into a family of scientists: her father Dr. Mikhail Anisimov is a well-known physicist. Her mother was a chemist and an accomplished piano player and singer who died in 1981. Tanya Anisimova became a naturalised American citizen in 1994.

Tanya began to study cello at 7 with Zoia Kamisheva and gave her first public performance the same year. After graduating with honors from the Moscow Conservatory (1989), where she studied with Igor Gavrysh, Anisimova continued her cello studies with George Neikrug at Boston University (Artist Diploma, 1992). While in Boston, she appeared regularly on WGBH Public Radio. In 1992, Anisimova was invited by Aldo Parisot to work on her Doctor of Musical Arts Degree at Yale. She graduated from Yale School of Music in 1995. In her doctoral thesis she focused on J.S. Bach's works for solo violin and solo cello and their interconnectedness.

Also in 1995, Anisimova and her husband artist Alexander Anufriev spent four months at the Virginia Center for the Creative Arts by an invitation of the VCCA's director William Smart. In the fall of 1995, Anisimova and Anufriev successfully presented their multimedia project titled Angels on Mt. San Angelo, The visual part included six canvases, 15 by 10 feet each, with angels representing six colors of a spectrum, all painted by Anufriev. The audio part consisted of Anisimova's Song on Mt. San Angelo, which was performed live during the presentation of the project. One year later, the project was repeated with success at the St. Mark's Church on Capitol Hill, Washington, D.C.

In 1999, Anisimova initiated the revival and consequently became the Artistic Director of the Mousetrap Concert Series in the historic town of Washington Grove, Maryland. Guest artists of the series have included Claude Frank, Natalia Gutman, Elisso Virsaladze, Paul Katz, The St. Petersburg Quartet, The Calder Quartet, The Thibaud Trio, The Scholars of London, Paul Galbraith, Tigran Alikhanov, Igor Gavrysh, among others. Since 2001, Tanya Anisimova and her husband reside in the Blue Ridge Mountains region of Central Virginia. Anisimova divides her time between touring, composing and recording.

== Playing style ==
The press has described cellist and composer Tanya Anisimova as the artist with "spiritual authority" and "a refined musical intelligence"; her performances - as "thoughtful and powerful, alluring and energizing"; her interpretations - as "invariably full of personality and character." Anisimova's original music has been quoted as "deeply emotional," "mystical," and "marrying a sense of wild fancy and studied control." Of the performer's live improvisations with her own vocalizing it has been said that they have "subtle harmonies" and "a very refined melody, clearly in Slavic style." Joseph McLellan of The Washington Post called Anisimova's improvisations "powerfully evocative vocalises, which she sang with a pure, precisely controlled voice."

== Discography ==
1. "Music from Mt. San Angelo," 1995 The Virginia Center for the Creative Arts

2. J.S. Bach, "Six Sonatas and Partitas for Solo Violin," 2001 Celle-stial Records Company This is the first complete cycle recorded on modern cello. Original keys were used except for partitas 1 & 3.

3. J.S. Bach, Six Suites for Solo Cello, 2002 Volume 1, Suites No. 1, 3 & 5

4. J.S. Bach, Six Suites for Solo Cello, 2004 Volume 2, Suites No. 2, 4 & 6 Celle-stial Records Company

5. "Concert in Moscow," 2003 Celle-stial Records Company

6. "Sufi Soul," 2006 Celle-stial Records Company

7. "Mystical Strings-Enchanted Cello," 2007 The Synchronicity Foundation

== Original works ==
Title	Instruments	Date	Notes
Abigail	Piano	2021	
Carol Suite	Cello	2019	premiered 02.2020, Arts on the Green, Gaithersburg, MD
Teacher	Cello Nonet	2017	premiered 08.2017, Sala De Revueltas, Mexico City
Sinfonietta	Guitar and Cello	2016	premiered 05.2017, Sundays Live, Kensington, MD
Farela	Cello and Piano	2015	premiered 11.2015, Promisek Series, CT
Homage To Janos Starker	Cello	2013	premiered 07.2013, Buckley Moss Museum, Waynesboro, VA
Homage To Sviatoslav Knushevitsky	Cello	2012	Obligatory piece for The International Knushevitsky Cello Competition, Saratov, Russian Federation
Leonardo	Clarinet, Cello and Piano	2009	premiered 01.2010, Classic Chamber Concerts, Naples, FL
Trio Appalachi	Violin, Cello and Piano	2007	premiered 07.2009, Wintergeen Summer Music Festival, VA
Seasons	Cello and Orchestra	2007-2008	premiered 11.2008, Sandler Center, Virginia Beach, VA
Icelandic Ballad	Cello and Piano	2007	premiered 10.2007, The Mansion at Strathmore, Bethesda, MD; European premiere 11.2007, Salurin Hall, Reykjavik, Iceland
Caravan	Two cellos	2007	premiered 04.2007, Mousetrap Concerts, MD
Adonai	Cello and String Orchestra	2006	premiered 06.2006, Chamber Hall, Moscow Conservatory, Moscow, Russia
Sufi Suite	Cello scordatura	2006	premiered, The Roerich Museum, New York City, NY
Quintet Concertante	cello and String Quartet	2005	premiered 10.2005, Casa Maria Series, Villa Casa Maria, VA
Mexico-Moscow	Cello and Piano	2005	premiered 02.2006., Sala de los Niños Cantores, Morelia, Mexico
Cynthia	Flute and Cello	2004	
Souvenir from St. Petersburg	Cello	2003	premiered 04.2003, The National Museum of Women in the Arts, Washington, D.C.
Requiem for The Innocent (September 11)	Cello	2001	premiered 10.2001, Washington Hebrew Congregation, Washington, D.C.
Song on Mount San Angelo	Cello	1995	premiered Virginia Center for the Creative Arts, Mount San Angelo, VA

== Cello transcriptions and arrangements ==
1995-2001, J.S. Bach, Complete Sonatas and Partitas for Violin Solo

2002, Francouer-Anisimova, Sonata for Two Cellos in D (inspired by the Cello Sonata E Major)

2008, Locatelli-Anisimova, Sonata for Cello and Piano (based on the original version for violin and continuo)

2003-2005, Ludwig van Beethoven, Complete Sonatas for Violin and Piano

2006-2008, Johannes Brahms, Complete Sonatas for Violin and Piano

2004, Pablo de Sarasate, Playera, Gypsy Aires

2004, Marin Marais, La Folia

2003, Diniku, Hora-Staccatto
