= Jonas Junkka =

Swedish ice hockey player

- Born: May 4, 1976 (age 50) Kiruna, Sweden
- Height: 6 ft 3 in (191 cm)
- Weight: 203 lb (92 kg; 14 st 7 lb)
- Position: Defense
- Shot: Right
- Played for: HPK Hameenlinna; Espoo Blues; London Knights; Luleå HF; Modo Hockey Ornskoldsvik; Syracuse Crunch; HIFK Helsinki
- NHL draft: 104th overall, 1993; Pittsburgh Penguins
- Playing career: 1994–2004

Jonas Andersson Junkka (born May 4, 1976) is a Swedish former professional ice hockey defenceman. He was drafted by the Pittsburgh Penguins in the 1993 NHL entry draft, being selected in the 4th round, 104th overall.

== Career ==
Junkka played nine of his ten professional seasons in Europe, the lone exception being when he played for the Syracuse Crunch of the American Hockey League during the 2000-01 season. Although Syracuse was a one-time AHL affiliate of the Pittsburgh Penguins, Junkka joined the team while the Crunch were affiliated with the Columbus Blue Jackets. At the age of 29 he played his last season in Luleå Hockey (Sweden) but had to retire at that age due to knee and hip injuries.

== Career statistics ==
=== Regular season and playoffs ===
			Regular season					Playoffs
Season	Team	League	GP	G	A	Pts	PIM	GP	G	A	Pts	PIM
1992–93	Kiruna IF	Division 1	30	3	7	10	32	—	—	—	—	—
1993–94	Kiruna IF	Division 1	32	6	10	16	34	—	—	—	—	—
1994–95	Västra Frölunda HC	SHL	19	0	2	2	2	—	—	—	—	—
1994–95	Västra Frölunda HC	Division 1	18	3	1	4	14	5	0	0	0	6
1995–96	Västra Frölunda HC	SHL	31	3	1	4	20	13	1	0	1	6
1996–97	Modo Hockey	SHL	12	1	3	4	10	—	—	—	—	—
1997–98	Modo Hockey	SHL	35	5	5	10	12	1	0	0	0	0
1998–99	Espoo Blues	Liiga	34	4	4	8	20	—	—	—	—	—
1998–99	HPK	Liiga	16	1	5	6	16	8	3	1	4	8
1999–00	HPK	Liiga	54	13	18	31	72	8	1	4	5	0
2000–01	Syracuse Crunch	AHL	58	5	14	19	49	2	0	0	0	0
2001–02	HIFK	Liiga	18	2	3	5	16	—	—	—	—	—
2001–02	Luleå HF	SHL	30	1	2	3	28	6	0	2	2	25
2002–03	Luleå HF	SHL	50	1	4	5	55	4	0	1	1	2
2003–04	Luleå HF	SHL	32	0	2	2	26	—	—	—	—	—
AHL totals			58	5	14	19	49	2	0	0	0	0
SHL totals			209	11	19	30	153	24	1	3	4	33

=== International ===
Year	Team	Event	Result	GP	G	A	Pts	PIM
1993	Sweden	EJC18	1st place, gold medalist(s)	6	1	2	3	0
1995	Sweden	WJC-20	3rd place, bronze medalist(s)	7	2	4	6	8
Junior totals				13	3	6	9	8

== Awards and accomplishments ==
- 1992-1993 U18 EJC Gold Medal
- 1994-1995 U20 WJC Bronze Medal
- 1995-1996 Elitserien SM-silver Medal
- 1998-1999 SM-liiga Bronze Medal
