= Alexei Anisimov (ice hockey) =

Russian ice hockey goaltender

- Born: April 15, 1984 (age 42) Togliatti, Russia
- Height: 5 ft 11 in (180 cm)
- Weight: 187 lb (85 kg; 13 st 5 lb)
- Position: Goaltender
- Catches: Left
- VHL team Former teams: Saryarka Karagandy; KHL; Amur Khabarovsk; HC Lada Togliatti
- NHL draft: Undrafted
- Playing career: 2003–present

Alexei Anisimov (born April 15, 1984) is a Russian ice hockey goaltender. He is currently playing with Saryarka Karagandy of the Supreme Hockey League (VHL).

Anisimov made his Kontinental Hockey League (KHL) debut playing with Amur Khabarovsk during the 2008–09 KHL season.
