= Bruce Gardiner =

Canadian ice hockey player (born 1972)

- Born: February 11, 1972 (age 54) Barrie, Ontario, Canada
- Height: 6 ft 1 in (185 cm)
- Weight: 185 lb (84 kg; 13 st 3 lb)
- Position: Centre
- Shot: Right
- Played for: Ottawa Senators; Tampa Bay Lightning; Columbus Blue Jackets; New Jersey Devils
- NHL draft: 131st overall, 1991; St. Louis Blues
- Playing career: 1994–2005

Bruce Allan Gardiner (born February 11, 1972) is a Canadian former professional ice hockey player and a Barrie Police officer

== Playing career ==
Gardiner was drafted 131st overall by the St. Louis Blues in the 1991 NHL entry draft and started his National Hockey League career with the Ottawa Senators in 1997. He also played for the Tampa Bay Lightning, Columbus Blue Jackets, and New Jersey Devils. He left the NHL after the 2002 season and moved to the Russian Super League with Lada Togliatti and then to Finland's SM-liiga with the Espoo Blues. He then had one more year in North America, playing for the Adirondack Frostbite of the United Hockey League before retiring in 2005.

Gardiner scored the first goal in Columbus Blue Jackets' franchise history.

=== Regular season and playoffs ===
			Regular season					Playoffs
Season	Team	League	GP	G	A	Pts	PIM	GP	G	A	Pts	PIM
1988–89	Barrie Colts Jr.B.	OHA-B	41	17	28	45	29	—	—	—	—	—
1989–90	Barrie Colts Jr.B.	OHA-B	40	19	26	45	89	—	—	—	—	—
1990–91	Colgate University	ECAC	27	4	9	13	72	—	—	—	—	—
1991–92	Colgate University	ECAC	23	7	8	15	77	—	—	—	—	—
1992–93	Colgate University	ECAC	33	17	12	29	64	—	—	—	—	—
1993–94	Colgate University	ECAC	33	23	23	46	70	—	—	—	—	—
1993–94	Peoria Rivermen	IHL	3	0	0	0	0	—	—	—	—	—
1994–95	Prince Edward Island Senators	AHL	72	17	20	37	132	7	4	1	5	4
1995–96	Prince Edward Island Senators	AHL	38	11	13	24	87	5	2	4	6	4
1996–97	Ottawa Senators	NHL	67	11	10	21	49	7	0	1	1	2
1997–98	Ottawa Senators	NHL	55	7	11	18	50	11	1	3	4	2
1998–99	Ottawa Senators	NHL	59	4	8	12	43	3	0	0	0	4
1999–00	Ottawa Senators	NHL	10	0	3	3	4	—	—	—	—	—
1999–00	Tampa Bay Lightning	NHL	41	3	6	9	37	—	—	—	—	—
2000–01	Columbus Blue Jackets	NHL	73	7	15	22	78	—	—	—	—	—
2001–02	Albany River Rats	AHL	45	5	18	23	71	—	—	—	—	—
2001–02	New Jersey Devils	NHL	7	2	1	3	2	—	—	—	—	—
2002–03	Tolyatti Lada	RSL	30	4	8	12	106	10	1	0	1	20
2003–04	Blues	SM-l	22	6	5	11	60	—	—	—	—	—
2004–05	Adirondack Frostbite	UHL	18	7	12	19	27	—	—	—	—	—
NHL totals			312	34	54	88	263	21	1	4	5	8
