= Rick Tabaracci =

Canadian ice hockey player

- Born: January 2, 1969 (age 57) Toronto, Ontario, Canada
- Height: 5 ft 11 in (180 cm)
- Weight: 190 lb (86 kg; 13 st 8 lb)
- Position: Goaltender
- Caught: Left
- Played for: Pittsburgh Penguins; Winnipeg Jets; Washington Capitals; Calgary Flames; Tampa Bay Lightning; Atlanta Thrashers; Colorado Avalanche
- National team: Canada
- NHL draft: 26th overall, 1987; Pittsburgh Penguins
- Playing career: 1988–2001

Medal record

Representing Canada

World Championships
Gold medal – first place	1997 Finland	

Richard Stephen Tabaracci (born January 2, 1969) is a Canadian former professional ice hockey goaltender.

== Biography ==
Tabaracci was born to a Finnish mother and an Italian father. As a youth, Tabaracci played in the 1982 Quebec International Pee-Wee Hockey Tournament with the Toronto Young Nationals minor ice hockey team.

Drafted 26th overall in the 1987 NHL entry draft by the Pittsburgh Penguins, Tabaracci also played for the Winnipeg Jets, Washington Capitals, Calgary Flames, Tampa Bay Lightning, Atlanta Thrashers, and Colorado Avalanche. He appeared in 286 NHL games between 1989 and 1999. Tabaracci represented Canada three times at the IIHF World Championships, winning a gold medal in 1997.

== Career statistics ==
=== Regular season and playoffs ===
			Regular season									Playoffs
Season	Team	League	GP	W	L	T	MIN	GA	SO	GAA	SV%	GP	W	L	MIN	GA	SO	GAA	SV%
1985–86	Markham Waxers	OJHL	40	19	11	6	2176	188	1	5.18	—	—	—	—	—	—	—	—	—
1986–87	Cornwall Royals	OHL	59	23	32	3	3347	290	1	5.20	—	5	1	4	303	26	0	3.17	—
1987–88	Cornwall Royals	OHL	58	33	18	6	3448	200	3	3.48	—	11	5	6	642	37	0	3.46	—
1987–88	Muskegon Lumberjacks	IHL	—	—	—	—	—	—	—	—	—	1	0	0	13	1	0	4.62	—
1988–89	Cornwall Royals	OHL	50	24	20	5	2974	210	1	4.24	—	18	10	8	1080	65	1	3.61	—
1988–89	Pittsburgh Penguins	NHL	1	0	0	0	33	4	0	7.27	.810	—	—	—	—	—	—	—	—
1989–90	Moncton Hawks	AHL	27	10	15	2	1580	107	2	4.06	.867	—	—	—	—	—	—	—	—
1989–90	Fort Wayne Komets	IHL	22	8	9	1	1064	73	0	4.12	—	3	1	2	159	19	0	7.17	—
1990–91	Moncton Hawks	AHL	11	4	5	2	645	41	0	3.81	.866	—	—	—	—	—	—	—	—
1990–91	Winnipeg Jets	NHL	24	4	9	4	1093	71	1	3.90	.875	—	—	—	—	—	—	—	—
1991–92	Moncton Hawks	AHL	23	10	11	1	1313	80	0	3.66	.888	—	—	—	—	—	—	—	—
1991–92	Winnipeg Jets	NHL	18	6	7	3	966	52	0	3.23	.889	7	3	4	387	26	0	4.03	.877
1992–93	Moncton Hawks	AHL	5	2	1	2	290	18	0	3.72	.883	—	—	—	—	—	—	—	—
1992–93	Winnipeg Jets	NHL	19	5	10	0	959	70	0	4.38	.859	—	—	—	—	—	—	—	—
1992–93	Washington Capitals	NHL	6	3	2	0	343	10	2	1.75	.938	4	1	3	304	14	0	2.77	.913
1993–94	Washington Capitals	NHL	32	13	14	2	1770	91	2	3.08	.889	2	0	2	111	6	0	3.24	.880
1993–94	Portland Pirates	AHL	3	3	0	0	176	8	0	2.72	.910	—	—	—	—	—	—	—	—
1994–95	Chicago Wolves	IHL	2	1	1	0	119	9	0	4.51	.873	—	—	—	—	—	—	—	—
1994–95	Washington Capitals	NHL	8	1	3	2	394	16	0	2.44	.891	—	—	—	—	—	—	—	—
1994–95	Calgary Flames	NHL	5	2	0	1	202	5	0	1.49	.946	1	0	0	19	0	0	0.00	1.000
1995–96	Calgary Flames	NHL	43	19	16	3	2391	117	3	2.94	.892	3	0	3	204	7	0	2.06	.917
1996–97	Calgary Flames	NHL	7	2	4	0	361	14	1	2.33	.910	—	—	—	—	—	—	—	—
1996–97	Tampa Bay Lightning	NHL	55	20	25	6	3012	138	4	2.75	.902	—	—	—	—	—	—	—	—
1997–98	Calgary Flames	NHL	42	13	22	6	2419	116	0	2.88	.893	—	—	—	—	—	—	—	—
1998–99	Washington Capitals	NHL	23	4	12	3	1193	50	2	2.51	.906	—	—	—	—	—	—	—	—
1999–00	Canadian National Team	Intl	1	0	1	0	60	4	0	4.00	.870	—	—	—	—	—	—	—	—
1999–00	Atlanta Thrashers	NHL	1	0	1	0	59	4	0	4.07	.875	—	—	—	—	—	—	—	—
1999–00	Cleveland Lumberjacks	IHL	10	5	5	0	568	28	0	2.96	.912	—	—	—	—	—	—	—	—
1999–00	Orlando Solar Bears	IHL	21	11	6	4	1231	53	1	2.58	.902	—	—	—	—	—	—	—	—
1999–00	Colorado Avalanche	NHL	2	1	0	0	60	2	0	2.00	.889	—	—	—	—	—	—	—	—
1999–00	Utah Grizzlies	IHL	11	4	4	3	626	24	1	2.30	.923	3	1	2	179	7	0	2.34	.910
2000–01	Utah Grizzlies	IHL	30	14	13	1	1648	67	1	2.44	.921	—	—	—	—	—	—	—	—
NHL totals			286	93	125	30	15,256	760	15	2.99	.893	17	4	12	1025	53	0	3.10	.897
