= 1993–94 NHL transactions =

This list is for 1993–94 NHL transactions within professional ice hockey league of players in North America. The following contains team-to-team transactions that occurred in the National Hockey League during the 1993–94 NHL season. It lists what team each player has been traded to, or claimed by, and for which players or draft picks, if applicable.

== June ==
Date			References
June 1, 1993	To Hartford Whalers Brad McCrimmon	To Detroit Red Wings 6th-rd pick – 1993 entry draft (# 152 – Tim Spitzig)	
June 8, 1993	To Detroit Red Wings Steve Maltais	To Tampa Bay Lightning Dennis Vial	
June 11, 1993	To Detroit Red Wings Aaron Ward; 4th-rd pick – 1993 entry draft (# 97 – John Jakopin)	To Winnipeg Jets Paul Ysebaert future considerations (Alan Kerr)^{1}	
June 11, 1993	To Winnipeg Jets Stephane Beauregard	To Philadelphia Flyers 3rd-rd pick – 1993 entry draft (PIT – # 62 – Dave Roche)^{2} 5th-rd pick – 1994 entry draft (DET – # 114 – Frederic Deschenes)^{3}	
June 15, 1993	To Quebec Nordiques Mark Matier	To Washington Capitals Kevin Kaminski	
June 16, 1993	To Edmonton Oilers 3rd-rd pick – 1994 entry draft (# 60 – Brad Symes)	To Tampa Bay Lightning Petr Klima	
June 18, 1993	To San Jose Sharks Jimmy Waite	To Chicago Blackhawks future considerations (Neil Wilkinson)^{4}	
June 19, 1993	To San Jose Sharks Dave Capuano	To Tampa Bay Lightning Peter Ahola	
June 20, 1993	To Hartford Whalers Sergei Makarov	To Calgary Flames future considerations (4th-rd pick – 1993 entry draft # 95 – Jason Smith)^{5}	
June 20, 1993	To Boston Bruins future considerations (Jon Casey)^{6}	To Dallas Stars Gord Murphy future considerations (Andy Moog)^{6}	
June 20, 1993	To Dallas Stars Paul Cavallini	To Washington Capitals future considerations (Enrico Ciccone)^{7}	
June 20, 1993	To San Jose Sharks Gaetan Duchesne	To Dallas Stars 6th-rd pick – 1993 entry draft (SJS – # 132 – Petri Varis)^{8}	
June 20, 1993	To San Jose Sharks Jeff Norton	To New York Islanders 3rd-rd pick – 1994 entry draft (# 63 – Jason Strudwick)	
June 20, 1993	To New Jersey Devils Peter Sidorkiewicz; 5th-rd pick – 1994 entry draft (CGY – # 107 – Nils Ekman)^{9} future considerations (Mike Peluso)^{10}	To Ottawa Senators Craig Billington; Troy Mallette; 4th-rd pick – 1993 entry draft (# 91 – Cosmo DuPaul)	
June 20, 1993	To Detroit Red Wings Greg Johnson; 5th-rd pick – 1994 entry draft (# 114 – Frederic Deschenes)	To Philadelphia Flyers Jim Cummings; 4th-rd pick – 1993 entry draft (# 88 – Charles Paquette)	
June 20, 1993	To Vancouver Canucks John Vanbiesbrouck	To New York Rangers future considerations (Doug Lidster)^{11}	
June 20, 1993	To Quebec Nordiques Martin Gelinas; 6th-rd pick – 1993 entry draft (# 137 – Nicholas Checco)	To Edmonton Oilers Scott Pearson	
June 20, 1993	To Quebec Nordiques Paul MacDermid; Reggie Savage	To Washington Capitals Mike Hough	
June 20, 1993	To Quebec Nordiques Mark Fitzpatrick; 1st-rd pick – 1993 entry draft (# 14 – Adam Deadmarsh)	To New York Islanders Ron Hextall; 1st-rd pick – 1993 entry draft (# 23 – Todd Bertuzzi)	
June 25, 1993	To Tampa Bay Lightning 3rd-rd pick – 1993 entry draft (# 55 – Allan Egeland)	To New York Rangers Glenn Healy	
June 26, 1993	To Hartford Whalers 1st-rd pick – 1993 entry draft (# 2 – Chris Pronger)	To San Jose Sharks Sergei Makarov; 1st-rd pick – 1993 entry draft (# 6 – Viktor Kozlov); 2nd-rd pick – 1993 entry draft (# 45 – Vlastimil Kroupa); 3rd-rd pick – 1993 entry draft (# 58 – Ville Peltonen)	
June 26, 1993	To San Jose Sharks 6th-rd pick – 1993 entry draft (# 132 – Petri Varis)	To Dallas Stars Dean Evason	
June 26, 1993	To Florida Panthers 2nd-rd pick – 1993 entry draft (# 41 – Kevin Weekes); 3rd-rd pick – 1993 entry draft (# 67 – Mikael Tjallden)	To Winnipeg Jets 2nd-rd pick – 1993 entry draft (# 31 – Scott Langkow)	
June 26, 1993	To New Jersey Devils Corey Millen	To Los Angeles Kings 5th-rd pick – 1993 entry draft (# 117 – Jason Saal)	
June 26, 1993	To Calgary Flames 5th-rd pick – 1993 entry draft # 121 – Darryl LaFrance)	To Washington Capitals Craig Berube	
June 26, 1993	To Calgary Flames Brad Schlegel	To Washington Capitals 7th-rd pick – 1993 entry draft (# 174 – Andrew Brunette)	
June 30, 1993	To New York Islanders Chris Luongo	To Ottawa Senators rights to Jeff Finley	
June 30, 1993	To Detroit Red Wings Kris Draper	To Winnipeg Jets future considerations ($1)	

1. Trade Completed on June 15, 1993.
2. Philadelphia's third-round pick went to Pittsburgh as the result of a trade on February 19, 1992, that sent Mark Recchi, Brian Benning and a first-round pick in the 1992 entry draft to Philadelphia in exchange for Kjell Samuelsson, Rick Tocchet, Ken Wregget and this pick. (The pick was a conditional third-round pick at the time of the trade.)
3. Philadelphia's fifth-round pick went to Detroit as the result of a trade on June 20, 1993, that sent Jim Cummings and Philadelphia's fifth-round pick in the 1994 entry draft to Detroit in exchange for Greg Johnson and this pick.
4. Trade Completed on July 9, 1993.
5. Trade Completed on June 26, 1993.
6. Trade Completed on June 25, 1993.
7. Trade Completed on June 25, 1993.
8. San Jose's sixth-round pick was re-acquired as the result of a trade on June 26, 1993, that sent Dean Evason to Dallas for this pick.
9. New Jersey's fifth-round pick went to Calgary as the result of a trade on June 29, 1994, that sent Calgary's third-round pick (# 71 overall) in the 1994 entry draft to New Jersey in exchange for New Jersey's third-round (# 77 overall), fourth-round (# 91 Overall) picks in the 1994 entry draft and this pick.
10. Trade Completed on June 26, 1993.
11. Trade Completed on June 25, 1993.

== July ==
Date			References
July 13, 1993	To San Jose Sharks 3rd-rd pick – 1994 entry draft (# 66 – Alexei Yegorov)	To Chicago Blackhawks Jeff Hackett	
July 29, 1993	To St. Louis Blues Jim Hrivnak	To Winnipeg Jets 6th-rd pick – 1994 entry draft (# 146 – Chris Kibermanis)^{1}	
July 30, 1993	To Toronto Maple Leafs cash	To Florida Panthers Dave Tomlinson	

1. Winnipeg's sixth-round pick was re-acquired as the result of a trade with Edmonton on March 15, 1994, that sent Mats Lindgren, Boris Mironov, a first-round and fourth-round picks in the 1994 entry draft to Edmonton in exchange for Dave Manson and this pick.
  Florida's sixth-round pick went to Edmonton as the result of a trade on December 6, 1993, that sent Geoff Smith and a fourth-round pick in the 1994 entry draft to Florida in exchange for a third-round picks in the 1994 entry draft and this pick.
  Winnipeg's sixth-round pick went to Florida as the result of a trade on November 25, 1993, that sent Randy Gilhen to Winnipeg in exchange for Stu Barnes and this pick.

== August ==
Date			References
August 3, 1993	To Florida Panthers Jason Cirone	To Winnipeg Jets Dave Tomlinson	
August 5, 1993	To San Jose Sharks Shawn Cronin	To Philadelphia Flyers cash	
August 10, 1993	To Montreal Canadiens 3rd-rd pick – 1994 entry draft (# 54 – Chris Murray)	To Mighty Ducks of Anaheim Patrik Carnback; Todd Ewen	
August 12, 1993	To Toronto Maple Leafs cash	To Winnipeg Jets Kevin McClelland	
August 25, 1993	To Toronto Maple Leafs Daniel Jardemyr	To Winnipeg Jets future considerations	
August 27, 1993	To Los Angeles Kings Shawn McEachern	To Pittsburgh Penguins Marty McSorley	
August 30, 1993	To Edmonton Oilers 7th-rd pick – 1994 entry draft (# 179 – Chris Wickenheiser) future considerations	To Detroit Red Wings Peter Ing	

== September ==
Date			References
September 1, 1993	To Buffalo Sabres Craig Simpson	To Edmonton Oilers Jozef Cierny; 4th-rd pick – 1994 entry draft (# 95 – Jussi Tarvainen)	
September 2, 1993	To Toronto Maple Leafs Todd Gillingham; Paul Holden	To Calgary Flames Brad Miller; Jeff Perry	
September 7, 1993	To Quebec Nordiques Mike Hurlbut	To New York Rangers Alexander Karpovtsev	
September 9, 1993	To Detroit Red Wings 5th-rd pick – 1995 entry draft (# 126 – David Arsenault)	To Philadelphia Flyers Stewart Malgunas	
September 10, 1993	To San Jose Sharks 10th-rd pick – 1994 entry draft (# 240 – Tomas Pisa)	To Edmonton Oilers Link Gaetz	
September 15, 1993	To Edmonton Oilers 8th-rd pick – 1994 entry draft (# 185 – Rob Guinn)	To Ottawa Senators Brian Glynn	
September 24, 1993	To St. Louis Blues Phil Housley	To Winnipeg Jets Nelson Emerson; Stephane Quintal	
September 30, 1993	To Buffalo Sabres 7th-rd pick – 1994 entry draft (# 168 – Steve Plouffe)	To New York Islanders Tom Draper	
September 30, 1993	To Chicago Blackhawks Darin Kimble	To Florida Panthers Keith Brown	
September 30, 1993	To Florida Panthers Evgeny Davydov	To Winnipeg Jets 4th-rd pick – 1994 entry draft (EDM – # 79 – Adam Copeland)^{1}	
September 30, 1993	To New Jersey Devils 6th-rd pick – 1994 entry draft (# 134 – Ryan Smart)	To Winnipeg Jets Brent Severyn	

1. Winnipeg's fourth-round pick went to Edmonton as the result of a trade on March 15, 1994, that sent Dave Manson and a sixth-round pick in the 1994 entry draft to Winnipeg in exchange for Boris Mironov, Mats Lindgren, a first-round pick in 1994 entry draft and this pick.

== October ==
Date			References
October 3, 1993	To Florida Panthers Brent Severyn	To Winnipeg Jets Milan Tichy	
October 5, 1993	To Detroit Red Wings Terry Carkner	To Philadelphia Flyers Yves Racine; 4th-rd pick – 1994 entry draft (# 88 – Sebastien Vallee)	
October 5, 1993	To Calgary Flames Peter Ahola	To Tampa Bay Lightning cash	
October 7, 1993	To Edmonton Oilers Adam Bennett	To Chicago Blackhawks Kevin Todd	
October 8, 1993	To Boston Bruins Paul Stanton	To Pittsburgh Penguins 3rd-rd pick – 1994 entry draft (# 73 – Greg Crozier)	
October 22, 1993	To Washington Capitals conditional draft pick – 1995 entry draft (TBL – 5th-rd – # 108 – Konstantin Golokhvasto)^{1}	To Tampa Bay Lightning Pat Elynuik	
October 26, 1993	To Buffalo Sabres Craig Muni; 5th-rd pick – 1995 entry draft (# 123 – Daniel Bienvenue)	To Chicago Blackhawks Keith Carney; 6th-rd pick – 1995 entry draft (# 146 – Marc Magliarditi)	
October 28, 1993	To Boston Bruins Jon Morris	To San Jose Sharks cash	

1. Tampa Bay's fifth-round pick was re-acquired as the result of a trade with Washington on March 21, 1994, that sent Joe Reekie to Washington in exchange for Enrico Ciccone and a conditional fifth round pick (this pick). Conditions of this draft pick are unknown.

== November ==
Date			References
November 2, 1993	To Hartford Whalers Steve Larmer; Bryan Marchment	To Chicago Blackhawks Patrick Poulin; Eric Weinrich	
November 2, 1993	To Hartford Whalers James Patrick; Darren Turcotte	To New York Rangers Nick Kypreos; Steve Larmer; Barry Richter; 6th-rd pick – 1994 entry draft (# 135 – Yuri Litvinov)	
November 2, 1993	To Los Angeles Kings conditional pick – 1995 entry draft^{2}	To Edmonton Oilers Jeff Chychrun	
November 3, 1993	To Hartford Whalers Marc Potvin	To Los Angeles Kings Doug Houda	
November 5, 1993	To Boston Bruins Dave Capuano	To San Jose Sharks cash	
November 5, 1993	To Toronto Maple Leafs cash	To Florida Panthers Mike Foligno	
November 11, 1993	To Edmonton Oilers Bob Beers	To Tampa Bay Lightning Chris Joseph	
November 19, 1993	To Hartford Whalers Jeff Reese	To Calgary Flames Dan Keczmer	
November 25, 1993	To Florida Panthers Stu Barnes; 6th-rd pick – 1994 entry draft (WIN – # 146 – Chris Kibermanis)^{2}	To Winnipeg Jets Randy Gilhen	
November 28, 1993	To Montreal Canadiens cash	To Philadelphia Flyers Rob Ramage	
November 30, 1993	To Florida Panthers Greg Hawgood	To Philadelphia Flyers cash	

1. Conditions of this draft pick are unknown. Los Angeles made no pick selection belonging to Edmonton in the 1995 entry draft.
2. Winnipeg's sixth-round pick was re-acquired as the result of a trade with Edmonton on March 15, 1994, that sent Mats Lindgren, Boris Mironov, a first-round and fourth-round picks in the 1994 entry draft to Edmonton in exchange for Dave Manson and this pick.
  Florida's sixth-round pick went to Edmonton as the result of a trade with Florida on December 6, 1993, that sent Geoff Smith and a fourth-round pick in the 1994 entry draft to Florida in exchange for a third-round picks in the 1994 entry draft and this pick.

== December ==
Date			References
December 6, 1993	To Edmonton Oilers 3rd-rd pick – 1994 entry draft (# 53 – Corey Neilson); 6th-rd pick – 1994 entry draft (WIN – # 146 – Chris Kibermanis)^{1}	To Florida Panthers Geoff Smith; 4th-rd pick – 1994 entry draft (# 84 – David Nemirovsky)	
December 6, 1993	To Edmonton Oilers Fredrik Olausson; 7th-rd pick – 1994 entry draft (# 160 – Curtis Sheptak)	To Winnipeg Jets 3rd-rd pick – 1994 entry draft (# 58 – Travis Hansen)	
December 7, 1993	To Toronto Maple Leafs Greg Smyth	To Florida Panthers cash	
December 9, 1993	To Edmonton Oilers cash	To Winnipeg Jets Craig Fisher	
December 15, 1993	To Buffalo Sabres James Black; 7th-rd pick – 1994 entry draft (# 176 – Steve Webb)	To Dallas Stars Gord Donnelly	
December 15, 1993	To Edmonton Oilers Brent Grieve	To New York Islanders Marc Laforge	
December 16, 1993	To Hartford Whalers Alexander Godynyuk	To Florida Panthers Jim McKenzie	
December 16, 1993	To Dallas Stars Jim McKenzie	To Florida Panthers 4th-rd pick – 1994 entry draft or 1995 entry draft (OTT – # 89 – Kevin Bolibruck)^{2}	

1. Winnipeg's sixth-round pick was re-acquired as the result of a trade with Edmonton on March 15, 1994, that sent Mats Lindgren, Boris Mironov, a first-round and fourth-round picks in the 1994 entry draft to Edmonton in exchange for Dave Manson and this pick.
2. Florida's fourth-round pick went to Ottawa as the result of a trade on January 6, 1994, that sent Bob Kudelski to Florida in exchange for Evgeny Davydov, Scott Levins, a sixth-round pick in the 1994 entry draft and this pick. The pick was taken on the 1995 entry draft

== January ==
Date			References
January 6, 1994	To Florida Panthers Bob Kudelski	To Ottawa Senators Evgeny Davydov; Scott Levins; 6th-rd pick – 1994 entry draft (# 131 – Mike Gaffney); 4th-rd pick – 1995 entry draft (# 89 – Kevin Bolibruck)	
January 8, 1994	To Los Angeles Kings Dixon Ward conditional pick – 1995 entry draft^{1}	To Vancouver Canucks Jimmy Carson	
January 17, 1994	To Boston Bruins Vincent Riendeau	To Detroit Red Wings 5th-rd pick – 1995 entry draft (# 125 – Chad Wilchynski)	
January 23, 1994	To San Jose Sharks cash	To New York Islanders David Maley	
January 23, 1994	To Quebec Nordiques Bob Bassen; Garth Butcher; Ron Sutter	To St. Louis Blues Denis Chasse; Steve Duchesne	
January 24, 1994	To Hartford Whalers Todd Harkins	To Calgary Flames Scott Morrow	
January 25, 1994	To Toronto Maple Leafs Mark Greig; 6th-rd pick – 1995 entry draft (# 139 – Doug Bonner)	To Hartford Whalers Ted Crowley	
January 28, 1994	To Los Angeles Kings Brad Tiley	To New York Rangers 11th-rd pick – 1994 entry draft (# 267 – Jamie Butt)	

1. Conditions of this draft pick are unknown and no pick was selected.

== February ==
Date			References
February 1, 1994	To San Jose Sharks Vyacheslav Butsayev	To Philadelphia Flyers Rob Zettler	
February 1, 1994	To Winnipeg Jets Wayne McBean	To New York Islanders Yan Kaminsky	
February 13, 1994	To Dallas Stars rights to Manny Fernandez	To Quebec Nordiques Tommy Sjodin; 3rd-rd pick – 1994 entry draft (# 72 – Chris Drury)	
February 15, 1994	To Los Angeles Kings Marty McSorley; Jim Paek	To Pittsburgh Penguins Shawn McEachern; Tomas Sandstrom	
February 20, 1994	To Mighty Ducks of Anaheim John Tanner	To Quebec Nordiques 4th-rd pick – 1995 entry draft (# 81 – Tomi Kallio)	
February 20, 1994	To Montreal Canadiens Ron Tugnutt	To Mighty Ducks of Anaheim Stephan Lebeau	
February 21, 1994	To Toronto Maple Leafs Pat Jablonski	To Tampa Bay Lightning cash	
February 21, 1994	To Montreal Canadiens cash	To Philadelphia Flyers Frederic Chabot	

== March ==
- Trading Deadline: March 21, 1994

Date			References
March 5, 1994	To Philadelphia Flyers Mark Lamb	To Ottawa Senators Claude Boivin rights to Kirk Daubenspeck	
March 8, 1994	To Detroit Red Wings Sergei Bautin; Bob Essensa	To Winnipeg Jets Tim Cheveldae; Dallas Drake	
March 10, 1994	To Hartford Whalers Ted Drury; Paul Ranheim; Gary Suter	To Calgary Flames Michael Nylander; James Patrick; Zarley Zalapski	
March 11, 1994	To Hartford Whalers Frantisek Kucera; Jocelyn Lemieux	To Chicago Blackhawks Randy Cunneyworth; Gary Suter; 3rd-rd pick – 1995 entry draft (VAN – # 61 – Larry Courville)^{1}	
March 11, 1994	To Chicago Blackhawks 11th-rd pick – 1994 entry draft (# 263 – Rob Mara)	To Ottawa Senators Troy Murray; 11th-rd pick – 1994 entry draft (# 274 – Antti Tormanen)	
March 15, 1994	To Edmonton Oilers Mats Lindgren; Boris Mironov; 1st-rd pick – 1994 entry draft (# 4 – Jason Bonsignore); 4th-rd pick – 1994 entry draft (# 79 – Adam Copeland)	To Winnipeg Jets Dave Manson; 6th-rd pick – 1994 entry draft (# 146 – Chris Kibermanis)	
March 18, 1994	To Toronto Maple Leafs Ken Belanger	To Hartford Whalers 9th-rd pick – 1994 entry draft (# 230 – Matt Ball)	
March 18, 1994	To Tampa Bay Lightning Jim Cummins; 4th-rd pick – 1995 entry draft (PHI – # 100 – Radovan Somik)^{2}	To Philadelphia Flyers Rob DiMaio	
March 19, 1994	To San Jose Sharks Ulf Dahlen; 7th-rd pick – 1995 entry draft (# 167 – Brad Mehalko)	To Dallas Stars Mike Lalor; Doug Zmolek	
March 19, 1994	To Florida Panthers Jeff Daniels	To Pittsburgh Penguins Greg Hawgood	
March 19, 1994	To Los Angeles Kings Donald Dufresne	To Tampa Bay Lightning 6th-rd pick – 1994 entry draft (# 137 – Dan Juden)	
March 21, 1994	To Dallas Stars Alan May; 7th-rd pick – 1995 entry draft (# 173 – Jeff Dewar)	To Washington Capitals Jim Johnson	
March 21, 1994	To New Jersey Devils Roy Mitchell; Reid Simpson	To Dallas Stars future considerations	
March 21, 1994	To Dallas Stars Pelle Eklund	To Philadelphia Flyers 8th-rd pick – 1994 entry draft (# 202 – Raymond Giroux)	
March 21, 1994	To Dallas Stars Mike Needham	To Pittsburgh Penguins Jim McKenzie	
March 21, 1994	To New York Rangers future considerations	To Ottawa Senators Phil Bourque	
March 21, 1994	To Detroit Red Wings Daniel Berthiaume	To Ottawa Senators Steve Konroyd	
March 21, 1994	To Chicago Blackhawks Tony Amonte rights to Matt Oates	To New York Rangers Stephane Matteau; Brian Noonan	
March 21, 1994	To Toronto Maple Leafs Mike Gartner	To New York Rangers Glenn Anderson rights to Scott Malone; 4th-rd pick – 1994 entry draft (# 100 – Alexander Korobolin)	
March 21, 1994	To Edmonton Oilers Todd Marchant	To New York Rangers Craig MacTavish	
March 21, 1994	To Florida Panthers Peter Andersson	To New York Rangers 9th-rd pick – 1994 entry draft (# 209 – Vitali Yeremeyev)	
March 21, 1994	To Quebec Nordiques Brad Werenka	To Edmonton Oilers Steve Passmore	
March 21, 1994	To Mighty Ducks of Anaheim Maxim Bets; 6th-rd pick – 1995 entry draft (STB – # 153 – Denis Hamel)^{3}	To St. Louis Blues Alexei Kasatonov	
March 21, 1994	To Washington Capitals Joe Reekie	To Tampa Bay Lightning Enrico Ciccone; 3rd-rd pick – 1994 entry draft (ANA – # 67 – Craig Reichert)^{3} conditional 5th-rd pick – 1995 entry draft (# 108 – Konstantin Golokhvasto)^{4}	
March 21, 1994	To Los Angeles Kings Kevin Todd	To Chicago Blackhawks 4th-rd pick – 1994 entry draft (# 85 – Steve McLaren)	
March 21, 1994	To Chicago Blackhawks Paul Ysebaert	To Winnipeg Jets 3rd-rd pick – 1995 entry draft (CHI – # 71 – Kevin McKay)^{5}	
March 21, 1994	To Boston Bruins Al Iafrate	To Washington Capitals Joe Juneau	
March 21, 1994	To Vancouver Canucks 4th-rd pick – 1994 entry draft (# 92 – Mike Dubinsky)	To Chicago Blackhawks Robert Dirk	
March 21, 1994	To Vancouver Canucks Jeff Brown; Bret Hedican; Nathan LaFayette	To St. Louis Blues rights to Craig Janney	

1. Chicago's third-round pick went to Vancouver as the result of a trade on April 7, 1995, that sent Gerald Diduck to Chicago in exchange for Bogdan Savenko and this pick.
2. Philadelphia's fourth-round pick was re-acquired as the result of a trade on September 6, 1994, that sent Alex Selivanov to Tampa Bay in exchange for this pick.
3. St. Louis' sixth-round pick was re-acquired as the result of a trade on July 8, 1995, that sent a sixth-round pick in the 1995 entry draft to Anaheim in exchange for this pick.
4. Tampa Bay's third-round pick went to Anaheim as the result of a trade on June 19, 1994, that sent a third-round pick in the 1994 entry draft to Tampa Bay in exchange for a fourth-round pick in the 1995 entry draft and this pick.
5. Conditions of this draft pick are unknown.
6. Chicago's third-round pick was re-acquired as the result of a trade on June 3, 1994, that sent Neil Wilkinson to Winnipeg in exchange for this pick.

== See also ==
- 1993 NHL entry draft
- 1993 in sports
- 1994 in sports
