= 1996–97 NHL transactions =

This list is for 1996–97 NHL transactions within professional ice hockey league of players in North America. The following contains team-to-team transactions that occurred in the National Hockey League during the 1996–97 NHL season. It lists what team each player has been traded to, or claimed by, and for which players or draft picks, if applicable.

== May ==
Date			References
May 21, 1996	To Washington Capitals Michel Picard	To Ottawa Senators cash	

== June ==
Date			References
June 1, 1996	To Dallas Stars Brad Lukowich	To New York Islanders 3rd-rd pick – 1997 entry draft (# 79 – Robert Schnabel)	
June 14, 1996	To Toronto Maple Leafs Jamie Baker; 5th-rd pick – 1996 entry draft (# 110 – Peter Cava)	To San Jose Sharks Todd Gill	
June 14, 1996	To Edmonton Oilers Bob Essensa	To Detroit Red Wings future considerations	
June 20, 1996	To Los Angeles Kings Eric Lacroix; 1st-rd pick – 1998 entry draft (# 21 – Mathieu Biron)	To Colorado Avalanche Stephane Fiset; 1st-rd pick – 1998 entry draft (# 17 – Martin Skoula)	
June 21, 1996	To Boston Bruins Jeff Odgers; 5th-rd pick – 1996 entry draft (# 132 – Elias Abrahamsson)	To San Jose Sharks Al Iafrate	
June 22, 1996	To San Jose Sharks 1st-rd pick – 1996 entry draft (# 21 – Marco Sturm)	To Chicago Blackhawks 2nd-rd pick – 1996 entry draft (# 31 – Remi Royer); 2nd-rd pick – 1996 entry draft (# 46 – Geoff Peters)	
June 22, 1996	To New Jersey Devils 2nd-rd pick – 1996 entry draft (# 41 – Josh DeWolf); 2nd-rd pick – 1996 entry draft (# 49 – Colin White)	To Pittsburgh Penguins 2nd-rd pick – 1996 entry draft (# 28 – Pavel Skrbek)	
June 22, 1996	To New Jersey Devils Jeff Reese; 2nd-rd pick – 1996 entry draft (# 47 – Pierre Dagenais); 8th-rd pick – 1996 entry draft (# 205 – Jason Bertsch)	To Tampa Bay Lightning Corey Schwab	
June 22, 1996	To Boston Bruins Trent McCleary; 3rd-rd pick – 1996 entry draft (# 53 – Eric Naud)	To Ottawa Senators Shawn McEachern	
June 22, 1996	To Dallas Stars 3rd-rd pick – 1996 entry draft (# 70 – Jonathan Sim); 4th-rd pick – 1996 entry draft (# 90 – Mike Hurley)	To Washington Capitals 3rd-rd pick – 1996 entry draft (# 58 – Sergei Zimakov)	
June 22, 1996	To Toronto Maple Leafs 3rd-rd pick – 1996 entry draft (# 66 – Mike Lankshear)	To Calgary Flames Dave Gagner	
June 22, 1996	To Toronto Maple Leafs Mike Gartner	To Phoenix Coyotes 4th-rd pick – 1996 entry draft (# 103 – Vladimir Antipov)	
June 22, 1996	To Edmonton Oilers 7th-rd pick – 1996 entry draft (# 170 – Brandon Lafrance)	To Pittsburgh Penguins Tyler Wright	
June 22, 1996	To Dallas Stars Sergei Zubov	To Pittsburgh Penguins Kevin Hatcher	

== July ==
Date			References
July 1, 1996	To Mighty Ducks of Anaheim Kevin Brown	To Ottawa Senators Mike Maneluk	
July 10, 1996	To Chicago Blackhawks Tuomas Gronman	To Colorado Avalanche 2nd-rd pick – 1998 entry draft (# 38 – Philippe Sauve)	
July 18, 1996	To Washington Capitals future considerations	To Philadelphia Flyers Frank Bialowas	
July 29, 1996	To Colorado Avalanche 2nd-rd pick – 1998 entry draft (# 28 – Ramzi Abid)	To Tampa Bay Lightning Craig Wolanin	

== August ==
Date			References
August 15, 1996	To San Jose Sharks 5th-rd pick – 1998 entry draft (# 145 – Mikael Samuelsson)	To Dallas Stars Sergei Gorbachev	
August 16, 1996	To Phoenix Coyotes Jeremy Roenick	To Chicago Blackhawks Craig Mills; Alexei Zhamnov; 1st-rd pick - 1997 entry draft (# 16 - Ty Jones)	
August 20, 1996	To San Jose Sharks Marty McSorley	To New York Rangers Jayson More; Brian Swanson; 4th-rd pick - 1997 entry draft (SJS - # 82 - Adam Colagiacomo)^{1}	
August 22, 1996	To Los Angeles Kings Petr Klima	To Tampa Bay Lightning 5th-rd pick - 1997 entry draft (# 109 - Jan Sulc)	
August 22, 1996	To New Jersey Devils Lyle Odelein	To Montreal Canadiens Stephane Richer	
August 27, 1996	To Detroit Red Wings 4th-rd pick - 1998 entry draft (TOR - # 87 - Alexei Ponikarovsky)^{2}	To Tampa Bay Lightning Dino Ciccarelli	

1. San Jose's sixth-round pick was re-acquired as the result of a trade on June 21, 1997 that sent fourth-round (# 93 overall) and sixth-round picks in the 1997 Entry Draft to the Rangers in exchange for this pick.
2. Detroit's acquired fourth-round pick went to Toronto as the result of a trade on March 24, 1998 that sent Jamie Macoun to Detroit in exchange for this pick.

== September ==
Date			References
September 4, 1996	To Colorado Avalanche Brent Severyn	To New York Islanders 3rd-rd pick - 1997 entry draft (CAR - # 80 - Francis Lessard)^{1}	
September 6, 1996	To Montreal Canadiens Andrei Kovalenko	To Edmonton Oilers Scott Thornton	
September 30, 1996	To Boston Bruins Rob DiMaio	To San Jose Sharks 5th-rd pick - 1997 entry draft (# 107 - Adam Spylo)	

1. Calgary's third-round pick went to Carolina as the result of a trade on March 5, 1997 that sent Hnat Domenichelli, Glen Featherstone, a second-round pick in the 1997 entry draft and a third-round pick in the 1998 entry draft to Calgary in exchange for Steve Chiasson and this pick. Hartford relocated to Raleigh to become the Carolina Hurricanes after the 1996–97 NHL season.
  Calgary previously acquired this pick as the result of a trade with the Islanders on November 27, 1996 that sent Paul Kruse to the Islanders in exchange for this pick.

== October ==
Date			References
October 1, 1996	To Hartford Whalers Kevin Browm	To Mighty Ducks of Anaheim rights to Espen Knutsen	
October 1, 1996	To Mighty Ducks of Anaheim Ted Drury rights to Marc Moro	To Ottawa Senators Shaun Van Allen; Jason York	
October 9, 1996	To Hartford Whalers Paul Coffey; Keith Primeau; 1st-rd pick – 1997 entry draft (# 22 – Nikos Tselios)	To Detroit Red Wings Brian Glynn; Brendan Shanahan	
October 10, 1996	To Toronto Maple Leafs Darby Hendrickson	To New York Islanders conditional 5th-rd pick (# 123 – Jiri Dopita) or 6th-rd pick – 1998 entry draft^{1}	
October 24, 1996	To Montreal Canadiens David Ling; 6th-rd pick – 1998 entry draft (# 152 – Gordie Dwyer)	To Calgary Flames Scott Fraser	
October 25, 1996	To Los Angeles Kings conditional pick – 1997 entry draft^{2}	To Pittsburgh Penguins Petr Klima	
October 29, 1996	To Montreal Canadiens Murray Baron; Shayne Corson; 5th-rd pick – 1997 entry draft (# 122 – Gennady Razin)	To St. Louis Blues Craig Conroy; Rory Fitzpatrick; Pierre Turgeon	

1. Conditions of this draft pick are unknown.
2. Conditions of this draft pick are unknown Los Angeles made no pick selection belonging to Pittsburgh in the 1997 entry draft.

== November ==
Date			References
November 2, 1996	To Colorado Avalanche Keith Jones; 1st-rd pick – 1998 entry draft (# 20 – Scott Parker); 4th-rd pick – 1998 entry draft (WAS - # 106 – Krys Barch)^{1}	To Washington Capitals Curtis Leschyshyn; Chris Simon	
November 8, 1996	To Montreal Canadiens Jason MacDonald	To Detroit Red Wings cash	
November 9, 1996	To Hartford Whalers Curtis Leschyshyn	To Washington Capitals Andrei Nikolishin	
November 13, 1996	To St. Louis Blues Sergio Momesso	To New York Rangers Brian Noonan	
November 13, 1996	To Montreal Canadiens Jassen Cullimore	To Vancouver Canucks Donald Brashear	
November 17, 1996	To Pittsburgh Penguins Andreas Johansson; Darius Kasparaitis	To New York Islanders Bryan Smolinski	
November 18, 1996	To Mighty Ducks of Anaheim Brian Bellows	To Tampa Bay Lightning 6th-rd pick – 1997 entry draft (# 153 – Andrei Skopintsev)	
November 19, 1996	To Mighty Ducks of Anaheim Shawn Antoski; Dmitri Mironov	To Pittsburgh Penguins Alex Hicks; Fredrik Olausson	
November 19, 1996	To Florida Panthers Chris Wells	To Pittsburgh Penguins Stu Barnes; Jason Woolley	
November 19, 1996	To Calgary Flames Aaron Gavey	To Tampa Bay Lightning Rick Tabaracci	
November 19, 1996	To Los Angeles Kings Chris Marinucci	To New York Islanders Nicholas Vachon	
November 22, 1996	To New Jersey Devils future considerations	To Los Angeles Kings Neal Broten	
November 22, 1996	To Boston Bruins Anders Myrvold; Landon Wilson	To Colorado Avalanche 1st-rd pick - 1998 entry draft (# 19 – Robyn Regehr)	
November 26, 1996	To New Jersey Devils Ken Sutton; 2nd-rd pick - 1999 entry draft (# 50 – Brett Clouthier)	To St. Louis Blues Mike Peluso; Ricard Persson	
November 27, 1996	To St. Louis Blues Pavol Demitra	To Ottawa Senators Christer Olsson	
November 27, 1996	To Calgary Flames 3rd-rd pick – 1997 entry draft (CAR - # 80 – Francis Lessard)^{2}	To New York Islanders Paul Kruse	
November 28, 1996	To Los Angeles Kings Brad Smyth	To Florida Panthers 3rd-rd pick – 1997 entry draft (# 56 – Vratislav Cech)	

1. Washington's fourth-round pick was re-acquired as the result of a trade on June 27, 1998 that sent a third-round pick in the 1998 entry draft to Colorado in exchange a fourth-round pick and fifth-round pick in the 1998 entry draft along with this pick.
2. Calgary's acquired third-round pick went to Carolina as the result of a trade on March 5, 1997 that sent Hnat Domenichelli, Glen Featherstone, a second-round pick in the 1997 entry draft and a third-round pick in the 1998 entry draft to Calgary in exchange for Steve Chiasson and this pick. Hartford relocated to Raleigh to become the Carolina Hurricanes after the 1996–97 NHL season.

== December ==
Date			References
December 7, 1996	To Florida Panthers Craig Fisher	To New York Islanders cash	
December 15, 1996	To Hartford Whalers Kevin Haller; 1st-rd pick – 1997 entry draft (SAS - # 23 – Scott Hannan)^{1} 7th-rd pick – 1997 entry draft (# 169 – Andrew Merrick)	To Philadelphia Flyers Paul Coffey; 3rd-rd pick – 1997 entry draft (# 62 – Kris Mallette)	
December 17, 1996	To San Jose Sharks cash	To Calgary Flames Yves Racine	
December 18, 1996	To Chicago Blackhawks Ivan Droppa	To Florida Panthers Alain Nasreddine conditional pick – 1999 entry draft^{2}	

1. Carolina's acquired first-round pick went to San Jose as the result of a trade on June 21, 1997 that sent a second-round in the 1997 Entry Draft and a third-round pick in the 1998 entry draft to Carolina in exchange for this pick. Hartford relocated to Raleigh to become the Carolina Hurricanes after the 1996–97 NHL season.
2. Conditions of this draft pick are unknown. Florida made no pick selection belonging to Chicago in the 1999 entry draft.

== January ==
Date			References
January 25, 1997	To San Jose Sharks Ed Belfour	To Chicago Blackhawks Ulf Dahlen; Michal Sykora; Chris Terreri	
January 27, 1997	To Detroit Red Wings Tomas Sandstrom	To Pittsburgh Penguins Greg Johnson	
January 31, 1997	To Toronto Maple Leafs Craig Wolanin	To Tampa Bay Lightning 3rd-rd pick – 1998 entry draft (EDM - # 67 – Alex Henry)^{1}	

1. Tampa Bay's acquired third-round pick went to Edmonton as the result of a trade on July 16, 1997 that sent Brantt Myhres and a third-round pick in the 1998 entry draft to Tampa Bay in exchange for Vladimir Vujtek and this pick.

== February ==
Date			References
February 6, 1997	To Phoenix Coyotes Jayson More	To New York Rangers Dallas Eakins; Mike Eastwood	
February 11, 1997	To New Jersey Devils Peter Zezel	To St. Louis Blues Chris McAlpine; 9th-rd pick - 1999 entry draft (# 270 – James Desmarais)	
February 21, 1997	To Mighty Ducks of Anaheim Jean-Jacques Daigneault	To Pittsburgh Penguins Garry Valk	
February 25, 1997	To New Jersey Devils Dave Ellett; Doug Gilmour; New Jersey's option of a 4th-rd pick – 1998 entry draft or 3rd-rd pick – 1999 entry draft (# 95 – Andre Lakos)	To Toronto Maple Leafs Jason Smith; Steve Sullivan rights to Alyn McCauley	

== March ==
- Trading Deadline: March 18, 1997

Date			References
March 1, 1997	To Boston Bruins Jason Allison; Jim Carey; Anson Carter; 3rd-rd pick – 1997 entry draft (# 63 – Lee Goren) conditional 2nd-rd pick – 1998 entry draft^{1} (# 52 – Bobby Allen)	To Washington Capitals Adam Oates; Bill Ranford; Rick Tocchet	
March 5, 1997	To Hartford Whalers Steve Chiasson; 3rd-rd pick – 1997 entry draft (# 80 – Francis Lessard)	To Calgary Flames Hnat Domenichelli; Glen Featherstone; 1st-rd pick - 1997 entry draft (# 51 – Dmitri Kokorev); 3rd-rd pick – 1998 entry draft (# 62 – Paul Manning)	
March 8, 1997	To San Jose Sharks Sergei Nemchinov; Brian Noonan	To Calgary Flames Russ Courtnall; Esa Tikkanen	
March 18, 1997	To Buffalo Sabres Miroslav Satan	To Edmonton Oilers Craig Millar; Barrie Moore	
March 18, 1997	To Montreal Canadiens Dave Manson	To Phoenix Coyotes Murray Baron; Chris Murray	
March 18, 1997	To Hartford Whalers Chris Murray	To Phoenix Coyotes Gerald Diduck	
March 18, 1997	To Hartford Whalers Derek King	To New York Islanders 5th-rd pick – 1997 entry draft (# 115 – Adam Edinger)	
March 18, 1997	To Toronto Maple Leafs Kelly Chase	To Hartford Whalers 8th-rd pick – 1998 entry draft (# 208 – Jaroslav Svoboda)	
March 18, 1997	To Hartford Whalers Bates Battaglia; 4th-rd pick – 1998 entry draft (# 91 – Josef Vasicek)	To Mighty Ducks of Anaheim Mark Janssens	
March 18, 1997	To Chicago Blackhawks Denis Chasse rights to Kevin Bolibruck; 6th-rd pick - 1998 entry draft (OTT - # 161 – Chris Neil)^{2}	To Ottawa Senators Mike Prokopec	
March 18, 1997	To Toronto Maple Leafs future considerations	To Detroit Red Wings Larry Murphy	
March 18, 1997	To Vancouver Canucks future considerations (5th-rd pick - 1998 entry draft # 140 – Rick Bertran)^{3}	To Pittsburgh Penguins Josef Beranek	
March 18, 1997	To Los Angeles Kings Glen Murray	To Pittsburgh Penguins Ed Olczyk	
March 18, 1997	To Mighty Ducks of Anaheim Richard Park	To Pittsburgh Penguins Roman Oksiuta	
March 18, 1997	To Toronto Maple Leafs Jason Podollan	To Florida Panthers Kirk Muller	
March 18, 1997	To Edmonton Oilers Drew Bannister; 6th-rd pick – 1997 entry draft (# 141 – Peter Sarno)	To Tampa Bay Lightning Jeff Norton	
March 18, 1997	To Calgary Flames Tyler Moss	To Tampa Bay Lightning Jamie Huscroft	
March 18, 1997	To Calgary Flames Tyrone Garner; Marty McInnis; 6th-rd pick - 1997 entry draft (# 140 – Ilja Demidov)	To New York Islanders Robert Reichel	
March 18, 1997	To Vancouver Canucks future considerations	To Philadelphia Flyers Frantisek Kucera	
March 18, 1997	To Calgary Flames Ravil Gusmanov	To Chicago Blackhawks Marc Hussey	
March 18, 1997	To Montreal Canadiens Steve Cheredaryk	To Phoenix Coyotes Pat Jablonski	

1. Conditions of this draft pick was if Washington were able to re-sign Rick Tocchet as a free agent. He signed with the Phoenix Coyotes on July 23, 1997 and Washington got a compensation pick in the 1998 Entry Draft that still went to Boston to complete the trade.
2. Ottawa's sixth-round pick was re-acquired as the result of a trade on September 24, 1997 that sent Kirk Daubenspeck to Chicago in exchange for future considerations and this pick.
3. Trade completed on June 27, 1998.

== See also ==
- 1996 NHL entry draft
- 1996 in sports
- 1997 in sports
