= Boris Mironov =

Russian ice hockey player

- Born: 21 March 1972 (age 54) Moscow, Russian SFSR, Soviet Union
- Height: 6 ft 3 in (191 cm)
- Weight: 220 lb (100 kg; 15 st 10 lb)
- Position: Defence
- Shot: Right
- Played for: CSKA Moscow; Winnipeg Jets; Edmonton Oilers; Chicago Blackhawks; New York Rangers; Vityaz Chekhov
- National team: Russia
- NHL draft: 27th overall, 1992; Winnipeg Jets
- Playing career: 1988–2010

Olympic medal record

Representing Russia

Men's Ice hockey
Silver medal – second place	1998 Nagano	Team
Bronze medal – third place	2002 Salt Lake City	Team

Boris Olegovich Mironov (Russian: Борис Олегович Миронов; born 21 March 1972) is a Russian former professional ice hockey defenceman. He is the younger brother of Dmitri Mironov.

== Playing career ==
Mironov began his hockey career with five seasons playing for HC CSKA Moscow. Selected in the second round of the 1992 NHL entry draft 27th overall, by the Winnipeg Jets, Mironov only played 65 games for the Jets in his rookie season before he was dealt to the Edmonton Oilers as part of a package that allowed Winnipeg to obtain fellow defenceman Dave Manson. Despite a dip in his performance immediately after the trade, Mironov's play was good enough to be named to the NHL All-Rookie Team. Mironov spent parts of six seasons as a top-two defenseman with the Oilers before being dealt to the Chicago Blackhawks. During his time in Edmonton, the fans and media often referred to him as BoBo.

After being dealt to Chicago, Mironov's play tailed off. Despite a good first season with the team, his offensive production diminished with each season. In 2003, he was traded to the New York Rangers where things did not improve much, eventually retiring after the 2003–04 season.

Mironov came out of retirement in 2006, suiting for Russian side Vityaz Chekhov. He played one season with the team before retiring for good in 2007.

== International play ==
Mironov is a two-time Olympian for the Russian national ice hockey team. He won a silver medal in 1998 in Nagano, Japan where he played with his brother Dmitri. He also won a bronze medal in 2002 in Salt Lake City, Utah.

== Transactions ==
- 20 June 1992 - Winnipeg drafts Mironov
- 15 March 1994 - Winnipeg trades Mironov, along with Mats Lindgren and 1st (Jason Bonsignore) and 4th (Adam Copeland) round draft picks to Edmonton in exchange for Dave Manson and a 6th round draft pick (Chris Kibermanis)
- 20 March 1999 - Edmonton trades Mironov, along with Jonas Elofsson and Dean McAmmond to Chicago in exchange for Chad Kilger, Ethan Moreau, Daniel Cleary and Christian Laflamme
- 8 January 2003 - Chicago trades Mironov to the Rangers for a 4th round draft pick.

== Career statistics ==
=== Regular season and playoffs ===
			Regular season					Playoffs
Season	Team	League	GP	G	A	Pts	PIM	GP	G	A	Pts	PIM
1988–89	CSKA Moscow	USSR	1	0	0	0	0	—	—	—	—	—
1989–90	CSKA Moscow	USSR	7	0	0	0	0	—	—	—	—	—
1989–90	SKA MVO Kalinin	USSR.2	2	0	1	1	0	—	—	—	—	—
1990–91	CSKA Moscow	USSR	36	1	5	6	16	—	—	—	—	—
1990–91	SKA MVO Kalinin	USSR.2	2	1	0	1	0	—	—	—	—	—
1991–92	CSKA Moscow	CIS	28	2	1	3	18	8	0	0	0	4
1991–92	CSKA–2 Moscow	CIS.3	3	1	2	3	4	—	—	—	—	—
1992–93	CSKA Moscow	IHL	19	0	5	5	20	—	—	—	—	—
1992–93	CSKA–2 Moscow	RUS.2	4	2	0	2	4	—	—	—	—	—
1993–94	Winnipeg Jets	NHL	65	7	22	29	96	—	—	—	—	—
1993–94	Edmonton Oilers	NHL	14	0	2	2	14	—	—	—	—	—
1994–95	Edmonton Oilers	NHL	29	1	7	8	40	—	—	—	—	—
1994–95	Cape Breton Oilers	AHL	4	2	5	7	23	—	—	—	—	—
1995–96	Edmonton Oilers	NHL	78	8	24	32	101	—	—	—	—	—
1996–97	Edmonton Oilers	NHL	55	6	26	32	85	12	2	8	10	16
1997–98	Edmonton Oilers	NHL	81	16	30	46	100	12	3	3	6	27
1998–99	Edmonton Oilers	NHL	63	11	29	40	104	—	—	—	—	—
1998–99	Chicago Blackhawks	NHL	12	0	9	9	27	—	—	—	—	—
1999–2000	Chicago Blackhawks	NHL	58	9	28	37	72	—	—	—	—	—
2000–01	Chicago Blackhawks	NHL	66	5	17	22	42	—	—	—	—	—
2001–02	Chicago Blackhawks	NHL	64	4	14	18	68	1	0	0	0	2
2002–03	Chicago Blackhawks	NHL	20	3	1	4	22	—	—	—	—	—
2002–03	New York Rangers	NHL	36	3	9	12	34	—	—	—	—	—
2003–04	New York Rangers	NHL	75	3	13	16	86	—	—	—	—	—
2006–07	Vityaz Chekhov	RSL	46	4	8	12	147	2	0	0	0	6
2008–09	HC Rys Podolsk	RUS.2	41	9	24	33	54	—	—	—	—	—
2009–10	Krylya Sovetov Moscow	RUS.2	20	4	8	12	18	—	—	—	—	—
USSR/CIS totals			72	3	6	9	34	8	0	0	0	4
NHL totals			716	76	231	307	891	25	5	11	16	45

=== International ===
Year	Team	Event	Place	GP	G	A	Pts	PIM
1989	Soviet Union	EJC	1st place, gold medalist(s)	5	3	2	5	2
1990	Soviet Union	EJC	2nd place, silver medalist(s)	6	1	0	1	0
1991	Soviet Union	WJC	2nd place, silver medalist(s)	6	0	3	3	0
1992	CIS	WJC	1st place, gold medalist(s)	7	2	2	4	29
1996	Russia	WC	4th	8	1	4	5	12
1998	Russia	OG	2nd place, silver medalist(s)	6	0	2	2	2
2002	Russia	OG	3rd place, bronze medalist(s)	6	1	0	1	2
Junior totals				24	6	7	13	31
Senior totals				20	2	6	8	16

== See also ==
Notable families in the NHL
