= Stefan Bergqvist =

Swedish ice hockey player (born 1975)

- Born: 10 March 1975 (age 51) Leksand, Sweden
- Height: 1.93 m (6 ft 4 in)
- Weight: 103 kg (227 lb; 16 st 3 lb)
- Position: Defence
- Shot: Left
- Played for: Pittsburgh Penguins
- NHL draft: 26th overall, 1993; Pittsburgh Penguins
- Playing career: 1992–2003

Stefan Rolf Bergqvist (born 10 March 1975) is a Swedish former professional ice hockey defenceman. He was drafted in the first round, twenty-sixth overall, of the 1993 NHL entry draft by the Pittsburgh Penguins and played seven games in the National Hockey League (NHL) with them.

== Career statistics ==
=== Regular season and playoffs ===
			Regular season					Playoffs
Season	Team	League	GP	G	A	Pts	PIM	GP	G	A	Pts	PIM
1991–92	Leksands IF	SWE U20	—	—	—	—	—	—	—	—	—	—
1992–93	Leksands IF	SWE U20	2	0	0	0	2	—	—	—	—	—
1992–93	Leksands IF	SEL	15	0	0	0	6	—	—	—	—	—
1993–94	Leksands IF	SWE U20	14	2	5	7	60	—	—	—	—	—
1993–94	Leksands IF	SEL	6	0	0	0	0	—	—	—	—	—
1994–95	London Knights	OHL	64	3	17	20	93	4	0	0	0	5
1995–96	Pittsburgh Penguins	NHL	2	0	0	0	2	4	0	0	0	2
1995–96	Cleveland Lumberjacks	IHL	61	2	8	10	58	3	0	0	0	14
1996–97	Cleveland Lumberjacks	IHL	33	0	1	1	54	4	0	0	0	0
1996–97	Pittsburgh Penguins	NHL	5	0	0	0	7	—	—	—	—	—
1997–98	Cleveland Lumberjacks	IHL	71	3	6	9	129	10	0	2	2	24
1998–99	Leksands IF	SEL	42	0	2	2	167	3	0	0	0	4
1999–00	Leksands IF	SEL	27	0	3	3	61	—	—	—	—	—
2000–01	Leksands IF	SEL	31	0	0	0	82	—	—	—	—	—
2001–02	EHC Black Wings Linz	AUT	25	3	9	12	61	—	—	—	—	—
2002–03	Ayr Scottish Eagles	IHSL	8	0	1	1	22	—	—	—	—	—
2002–03	HC Asiago	ITA	16	0	5	5	45	3	0	1	1	10
2003–04	Borlänge HF	SWE-3	19	2	8	10	51	—	—	—	—	—
2003–04	Björbo IF	SWE-4	—	—	—	—	—	—	—	—	—	—
SEL totals			121	0	5	5	316	3	0	0	0	4
NHL totals			7	0	0	0	9	4	0	0	0	2

=== International ===
Year	Team	Event	GP	G	A	Pts	PIM
1993	Sweden	EJC	6	1	1	2	8
Junior totals			6	1	1	2	8

Preceded by Martin Straka	Pittsburgh Penguins first-round draft pick 1993	Succeeded by Chris Wells
