= Jim Cummins (ice hockey) =

American ice hockey player (born 1970)

- Born: May 15, 1970 (age 56) Dearborn, Michigan, U.S.
- Height: 6 ft 2 in (188 cm)
- Weight: 200 lb (91 kg; 14 st 4 lb)
- Position: Right wing
- Shot: Right
- Played for: Detroit Red Wings; Philadelphia Flyers; Tampa Bay Lightning; Chicago Blackhawks; Phoenix Coyotes; Montreal Canadiens; Mighty Ducks of Anaheim; New York Islanders; Colorado Avalanche
- NHL draft: 67th overall, 1989; New York Rangers
- Playing career: 1991–2004

James Stephen Cummins (born May 15, 1970) is an American former professional ice hockey player. Cummins was drafted 67th overall by the New York Rangers in the 1989 NHL entry draft. He played 12 seasons in the National Hockey League (NHL) for the Detroit Red Wings, Philadelphia Flyers, Tampa Bay Lightning, Chicago Blackhawks, Phoenix Coyotes, Montreal Canadiens, Mighty Ducks of Anaheim, New York Islanders, and Colorado Avalanche.

== Playing career ==
As a youth, Cummins played in the 1983 Quebec International Pee-Wee Hockey Tournament with the Michigan Dynamos minor ice hockey team.

Cummins spent three years with the Michigan State Spartans before going pro. While in college, Cummins established himself as an enforcer. Cummins brought the same intensity to the NHL, where he quickly established a reputation among fellow heavyweights. He made his NHL debut on March 8, 1992 with the Detroit Red Wings. The Red Wings traded Cummins to the Philadelphia Flyers in June 1993.

On March 18, 1994, Cummins was traded by the Flyers to the Tampa Bay Lightning in exchange for Rob DiMaio.

While playing with the Chicago Blackhawks in 1996, Cummins was suspended eight games and fined $1,000 for an altercation during a game against the Florida Panthers.

Cummins' 2001–02 season began slowly after enduring an abdominal injury during training camp with the Ducks. He returned to the lineup only to be injured again and sent to their minor league affiliate, the Cincinnati Mighty Ducks. On January 14, 2002, Cummins was traded to the New York Islanders in exchange for Dave Roche. Then Islanders general manager Mike Milbury had brought him in to give the team some toughness. Cummins originally retired after the 2001–2002 season, but returned to play for the Colorado Avalanche during the 2003–2004 season. After one season with the Avalanche, he retired for good in 2004.

As of 2018, Cummins is currently an amateur scout for the Calgary Flames.

== Career statistics ==
			Regular season					Playoffs
Season	Team	League	GP	G	A	Pts	PIM	GP	G	A	Pts	PIM
1987–88	Detroit Compuware Ambassadors	NAHL	31	11	15	26	136	—	—	—	—	—
1988–89	Michigan State Spartans	CCHA	36	3	9	12	100	—	—	—	—	—
1989–80	Michigan State Spartans	CCHA	41	8	7	15	94	—	—	—	—	—
1990–91	Michigan State Spartans	CCHA	34	9	6	15	110	—	—	—	—	—
1991–92	Adirondack Red Wings	AHL	65	7	13	20	338	5	0	0	0	19
1991–92	Detroit Red Wings	NHL	1	0	0	0	7	—	—	—	—	—
1992–93	Adirondack Red Wings	AHL	43	16	4	20	179	9	3	1	4	4
1992–93	Detroit Red Wings	NHL	7	1	1	2	58	—	—	—	—	—
1993–94	Philadelphia Flyers	NHL	22	1	2	3	71	—	—	—	—	—
1993–94	Hershey Bears	AHL	17	6	6	12	70	—	—	—	—	—
1993–94	Tampa Bay Lightning	NHL	4	0	0	0	13	—	—	—	—	—
1993–94	Atlanta Knights	IHL	7	4	5	9	14	13	1	2	3	90
1994–95	Tampa Bay Lightning	NHL	10	1	0	1	41	—	—	—	—	—
1994–95	Chicago Blackhawks	NHL	27	3	1	4	117	14	1	1	2	4
1995–96	Chicago Blackhawks	NHL	52	2	4	6	180	10	0	0	0	2
1996–97	Chicago Blackhawks	NHL	65	6	6	12	199	6	0	0	0	24
1997–98	Chicago Blackhawks	NHL	55	0	2	2	178	—	—	—	—	—
1997–98	Phoenix Coyotes	NHL	20	0	0	0	47	3	0	0	0	4
1998–99	Phoenix Coyotes	NHL	55	1	7	8	190	3	0	1	1	0
1999–2000	Montreal Canadiens	NHL	47	3	5	8	92	—	—	—	—	—
2000–01	Mighty Ducks of Anaheim	NHL	79	5	6	11	167	—	—	—	—	—
2001–02	Cincinnati Mighty Ducks	AHL	11	1	4	5	39	—	—	—	—	—
2001–02	Mighty Ducks of Anaheim	NHL	2	0	0	0	0	—	—	—	—	—
2001–02	New York Islanders	NHL	10	0	0	0	31	1	0	0	0	9
2003–04	Colorado Avalanche	NHL	55	1	2	3	147	—	—	—	—	—
NHL totals			511	24	36	60	1538	37	1	2	3	43
