= Chris Wells (ice hockey) =

Canadian ice hockey player (born 1975)

- Born: November 12, 1975 (age 50) Calgary, Alberta, Canada
- Height: 6 ft 6 in (198 cm)
- Weight: 223 lb (101 kg; 15 st 13 lb)
- Position: Centre
- Shot: Left
- Played for: Pittsburgh Penguins; Florida Panthers; Khabarovsk Amur; Milano Vipers; Rødovre Mighty Bulls
- NHL draft: 24th overall, 1994; Pittsburgh Penguins
- Playing career: 1995–2005

Chris Wells (born November 12, 1975) is a Canadian former professional hockey player who played in the NHL with the Pittsburgh Penguins and Florida Panthers.

== Playing career ==
Wells was playing with the Seattle Thunderbirds in the WHL when he was drafted in the 1st round, 24th overall by the Pittsburgh Penguins in the 1994 NHL entry draft. His large size (6'6" 223 lbs) along with a strong physical presence and scoring touch contributed to his high draft choice. For the 1994–1995 season Wells returned to the Thunderbirds and scored 108 points in 68 games while contributing 148 PIMs as well. The following year Wells made his debut in the NHL, appearing in 54 games with the Penguins. Wells began the 1996–97 year with the Cleveland Lumberjacks of the IHL when he was traded by the Penguins to the Florida Panthers for Stu Barnes and Jason Woolley. He played 4 years with the Panthers, having his best year during the 1997–98 campaign in which he scored 15 points and appeared in 61 games.

Wells also skated for the New York Rangers and was signed by the Dallas Stars in 2000 . Instead he was sent to the Utah Grizzlies. On November 20, 2002, Wells debuted in the Russian Superleague with the Khabarovsk Amur Tigers and played on a line with former NHL all-star Sergei Krivokrasov. He later played parts of three seasons in Italy, Russia and Denmark.

Wells retired from hockey in 2005.

== Career statistics ==
			Regular season					Playoffs
Season	Team	League	GP	G	A	Pts	PIM	GP	G	A	Pts	PIM
1990–91	Calgary Royals	AJHL	35	13	14	27	33	—	—	—	—	—
1991–92	Seattle Thunderbirds	WHL	64	13	8	21	80	11	0	0	0	15
1992–93	Seattle Thunderbirds	WHL	63	18	37	55	111	5	2	3	5	4
1993–94	Seattle Thunderbirds	WHL	69	30	44	74	150	9	6	5	11	23
1994–95	Seattle Thunderbirds	WHL	69	45	63	108	148	3	0	1	1	4
1994–95	Cleveland Lumberjacks	IHL	3	0	1	1	2	—	—	—	—	—
1995–96	Pittsburgh Penguins	NHL	54	2	2	4	59	—	—	—	—	—
1996–97	Cleveland Lumberjacks	IHL	15	4	6	10	9	—	—	—	—	—
1996–97	Florida Panthers	NHL	47	2	6	8	42	3	0	0	0	0
1997–98	Florida Panthers	NHL	61	5	10	15	47	—	—	—	—	—
1998–99	Florida Panthers	NHL	20	0	2	2	31	—	—	—	—	—
1998–99	Beast of New Haven	AHL	9	3	1	4	28	—	—	—	—	—
1999–2000	Florida Panthers	NHL	13	0	0	0	14	—	—	—	—	—
1999–2000	Louisville Panthers	AHL	31	8	10	18	20	—	—	—	—	—
1999–2000	Hartford Wolf Pack	AHL	14	2	2	4	6	20	3	4	7	38
2000–01	Utah Grizzlies	IHL	43	6	6	12	33	—	—	—	—	—
2001–02	Wheeling Nailers	ECHL	60	18	31	49	80	—	—	—	—	—
2001–02	Portland Pirates	AHL	3	0	0	0	0	—	—	—	—	—
2002–03	Peoria Rivermen	ECHL	9	3	4	7	24	—	—	—	—	—
2002–03	Amur Khabarovsk	RSL	22	3	5	8	46	—	—	—	—	—
2003–04	Milano Vipers	ITA	23	17	10	27	59	9	1	8	9	30
2004–05	Rødovre Mighty Bulls	DNK	35	11	11	22	75	4	1	2	3	45
IHL totals			61	10	13	23	44	—	—	—	—	—
NHL totals			195	9	20	29	193	3	0	0	0	0
AHL totals			57	13	13	26	54	20	3	4	7	38

== Awards ==
- 1995: WHL West First All-Star Team
- 2000: Calder Cup winner AHL
- 2004: European championship Italy

Sporting positions
Preceded by Stefan Bergkvist	Pittsburgh Penguins first-round draft pick 1994	Succeeded by Aleksey Morozov
