= Dave Manson =

Canadian ice hockey player and coach

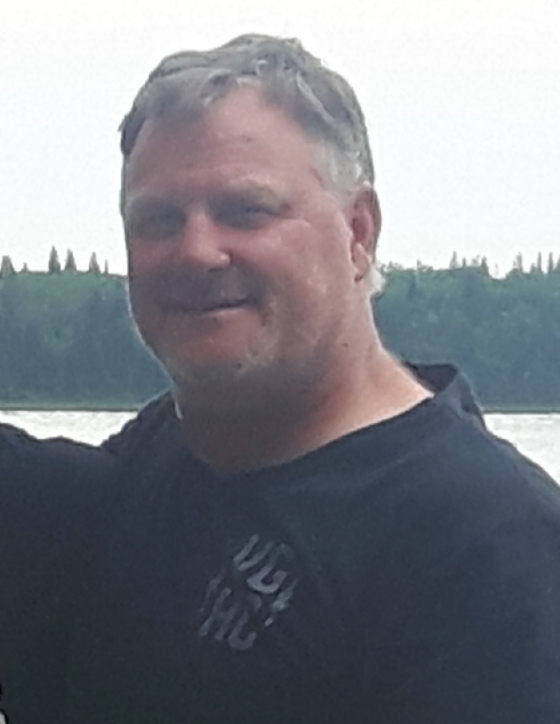
- Manson in 2017
- Born: January 27, 1967 (age 59) Prince Albert, Saskatchewan, Canada
- Height: 6 ft 2 in (188 cm)
- Weight: 202 lb (92 kg; 14 st 6 lb)
- Position: Defence
- Shot: Left
- Played for: Chicago Blackhawks; Edmonton Oilers; Winnipeg Jets; Phoenix Coyotes; Montreal Canadiens; Dallas Stars; Toronto Maple Leafs
- National team: Canada
- NHL draft: 11th overall, 1985; Chicago Black Hawks
- Playing career: 1986–2002

David Michael Manson (born January 27, 1967) is a Canadian professional ice hockey coach and former defenceman who played in the National Hockey League (NHL) with several teams. He is currently the head coach of the American Hockey League’s San Diego Gulls.

== Playing career ==
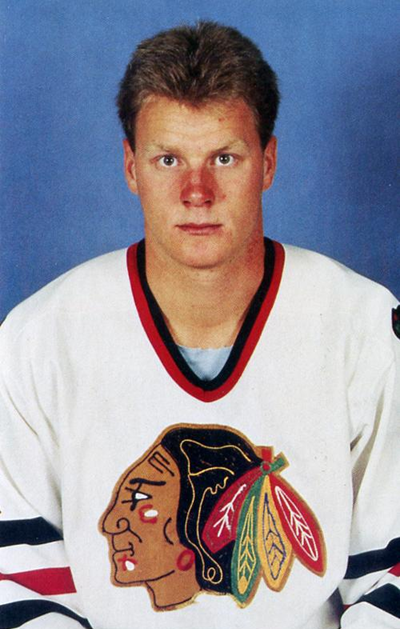
1986 photo of Dave Manson for Chicago Blackhawks

Manson played junior hockey with his hometown Prince Albert Raiders in the Western Hockey League. He was drafted 11th overall by the Chicago Blackhawks in the 1985 NHL entry draft, and joined the team a year later. In the 1988–89 season, he recorded 352 penalty minutes for the Blackhawks, recording a penalty minute in 60 of his 79 games played that year. His sixty games with at least one penalty minute is the most in a season in NHL history.

He also played for the Edmonton Oilers, Winnipeg Jets/Phoenix Coyotes, Montreal Canadiens, Dallas Stars and Toronto Maple Leafs.

He retired in 2002 with 390 points and 2,792 penalty minutes in 1,103 career NHL games.

== Coaching career ==
Manson worked as an assistant coach with the Prince Albert Raiders from 2002 to 2009, leaving briefly to take a coaching job with the Prince Albert Mintos. He returned to his post prior to the start of the 2011-12 WHL season, remaining there until 2018.

Manson was hired by the Edmonton Oilers as an assistant coach for their top affiliate, the Bakersfield Condors of the American Hockey League, on June 4, 2018. He was promoted to assistant coach of the Oilers on February 10, 2022., and was relieved of his duties on November 12, 2023.

He was hired by the Anaheim Ducks to serve as an assistant with the San Diego Gulls prior to the 2025-26 AHL season, and was promoted to head coach on July 20, 2026. It is Manson’s first head-coaching position after 24 seasons as an assistant or associate coach.

== Transactions ==
- October 2, 1991 – Traded from Chicago Blackhawks with future considerations to Edmonton Oilers for Steve Smith.
- March 15, 1994 – Traded from Edmonton Oilers with 6th round pick (Chris Kibermanis) to Winnipeg Jets for Mats Lindgren, Boris Mironov, 1st round pick (Jason Bonsignore), and 4th round pick (Adam Copeland).
- March 18, 1997 – Traded from Phoenix Coyotes to Montreal Canadiens for Murray Baron and Chris Murray.
- November 16, 1998 – Traded from Montreal Canadiens with Jocelyn Thibault and Brad Brown to Chicago Blackhawks for Jeff Hackett, Eric Weinrich, Alain Nasreddine, and a conditional draft pick.
- February 8, 2000 – Traded from Chicago Blackhawks with Sylvain Côté to Dallas Stars for Kevin Dean, Derek Plante, and 2nd round pick in the 2001 draft (Matt Keith).
- November 21, 2001 – Traded from Toronto Maple Leafs to Dallas Stars for Jyrki Lumme.

== Personal life ==
Manson and his late wife, Lana have four children. He currently resides in Christopher Lake, Saskatchewan.

His son, Josh, is a defenceman for the Colorado Avalanche, and his daughter, Meagan played for the women's soccer team at the University of Saskatchewan. He also has twins; a son, Ben, who previously played for the La Ronge Ice Wolves of the Saskatchewan Junior Hockey League from 2017 to 2020, and a daughter, Emma.

Manson is remembered for his low raspy voice, which occurred after taking a hard punch to the throat from Sergio Momesso during a 1991 game. The force of Momesso's punch caused permanent damage to Manson's larynx.

== Career statistics ==
=== Regular season and playoffs ===
			Regular season					Playoffs
Season	Team	League	GP	G	A	Pts	PIM	GP	G	A	Pts	PIM
1982–83	Prince Albert Mintos	SMHL	28	11	11	22	170	—	—	—	—	—
1982–83	Prince Albert Raiders	WHL	6	0	1	1	9	—	—	—	—	—
1983–84	Prince Albert Raiders	WHL	70	2	7	9	233	5	0	0	0	4
1984–85	Prince Albert Raiders	WHL	72	8	30	38	247	13	1	0	1	34
1984–85	Prince Albert Raiders	MC	—	—	—	—	—	5	0	1	1	10
1985–86	Prince Albert Raiders	WHL	70	14	34	48	177	20	1	8	9	63
1986–87	Chicago Blackhawks	NHL	63	1	8	9	146	3	0	0	0	10
1987–88	Chicago Blackhawks	NHL	54	1	6	7	185	5	0	0	0	27
1987–88	Saginaw Hawks	IHL	6	0	3	3	37	—	—	—	—	—
1988–89	Chicago Blackhawks	NHL	79	18	36	54	352	16	0	8	8	84
1989–90	Chicago Blackhawks	NHL	59	5	23	28	301	20	2	4	6	46
1990–91	Chicago Blackhawks	NHL	75	14	15	29	191	6	0	1	1	36
1991–92	Edmonton Oilers	NHL	79	15	32	47	220	16	3	9	12	44
1992–93	Edmonton Oilers	NHL	83	15	30	45	210	—	—	—	—	—
1993–94	Edmonton Oilers	NHL	57	3	13	16	140	—	—	—	—	—
1993–94	Winnipeg Jets	NHL	13	1	4	5	51	—	—	—	—	—
1994–95	Winnipeg Jets	NHL	44	3	15	18	139	—	—	—	—	—
1995–96	Winnipeg Jets	NHL	82	7	23	30	205	6	2	1	3	30
1996–97	Phoenix Coyotes	NHL	66	3	17	20	164	—	—	—	—	—
1996–97	Montreal Canadiens	NHL	9	1	1	2	23	5	0	0	0	17
1997–98	Montreal Canadiens	NHL	81	4	30	34	122	10	0	1	1	14
1998–99	Montreal Canadiens	NHL	11	0	2	2	48	—	—	—	—	—
1998–99	Chicago Blackhawks	NHL	64	6	15	21	107	—	—	—	—	—
1999–2000	Chicago Blackhawks	NHL	37	0	7	7	40	—	—	—	—	—
1999–2000	Dallas Stars	NHL	26	1	2	3	22	23	0	0	0	33
2000–01	Toronto Maple Leafs	NHL	74	4	7	11	93	2	0	0	0	2
2001–02	Toronto Maple Leafs	NHL	13	0	1	1	10	—	—	—	—	—
2001–02	Dallas Stars	NHL	34	0	1	1	23	—	—	—	—	—
2001–02	Utah Grizzlies	AHL	2	0	0	0	2	—	—	—	—	—
NHL totals			1,103	102	288	390	2,792	112	7	24	31	343

=== International ===
Year	Team	Event		GP	G	A	Pts	PIM
1993	Canada	WC	4th	8	3	7	10	22

== Coaching history ==
Season	Team	Lge	Role
2002–09	Prince Albert Raiders	WHL	Assistant coach
2009–12	Prince Albert Mintos	SMAAAHL	Assistant coach
2012–18	Prince Albert Raiders	WHL	Associate coach
2018–22	Bakersfield Condors	AHL	Assistant coach
2022–23	Edmonton Oilers	NHL	Assistant coach
2004–25	Lethbridge Hurricanes	WHL	Assistant coach
2025–26	San Diego Gulls	AHL	Assistant coach
2026–	San Diego Gulls	AHL	Head coach

== Awards ==
- WHL East Second All-Star Team – 1986

== See also ==
- List of NHL players with 1,000 games played
- List of NHL players with 2,000 career penalty minutes

Preceded by Ed Olczyk	Chicago Blackhawks first-round draft pick 1985	Succeeded by Everett Sanipass
