= Chris Murray (ice hockey, born 1974) =

Canadian ice hockey player

- Born: October 25, 1974 (age 51) Port Hardy, British Columbia, Canada
- Height: 5 ft 4 in (163 cm)
- Weight: 213 lb (97 kg; 15 st 3 lb)
- Position: Right wing
- Shot: Right
- Played for: Montreal Canadiens; Hartford Whalers; Carolina Hurricanes; Ottawa Senators; Chicago Blackhawks; Dallas Stars
- NHL draft: 54th overall, 1994; Montreal Canadiens
- Playing career: 1994–2001

Chris Murray (born October 25, 1974) is a Canadian former professional ice hockey player. He played between 1994 and 2000 in the National Hockey League (NHL).

== Playing career ==
Murray was drafted 54th overall by the Montreal Canadiens in 1994 from the Western Hockey League's Kamloops Blazers and started his National Hockey League career with the Canadiens in the 1994–95 NHL season. He remained with the team for the best of three years before he was part of a three-way trade between Montreal, the Phoenix Coyotes and the Hartford Whalers on March 18, 1997. Murray was first traded to Phoenix with Murray Baron for Dave Manson and was then traded to Hartford for Gerald Diduck. The next season the Whalers relocated to Raleigh, North Carolina and became the Carolina Hurricanes. He played seven games for Carolina before he was traded to the Ottawa Senators for Sean Hill. On March 23, 1999, he was traded once more, this time to the Chicago Blackhawks for Nelson Emerson and a draft pick, but he played just four games for the team before sustaining a shoulder injury. In the fall of 1999 he was claimed on waivers by Dallas. He split time with them and their farm team, the Michigan K-Wings of the International Hockey League. He signed with the St. Louis Blues for the 2000-2001 season, but he was demoted to the Worcester IceCats of the American Hockey League. There he suffered what would later prove to be a career-ending injury. He joined the Toronto Maple Leafs organization in the fall of 2001 in a failed attempt to rehabilitate his injury, and he retired on his 27th birthday, October 25, 2001.

== Post-playing career ==
After retiring from hockey Murray worked at the Kamloops Fire Department, and also served as a part-time assistant coach for the WHL Kamloops Blazers. He also dedicated a lot of his time to coaching for the Kamloops Minor Hockey Association.

== Career statistics ==
=== Regular season and playoffs ===
			Regular season					Playoffs
Season	Team	League	GP	G	A	Pts	PIM	GP	G	A	Pts	PIM
1990–91	Bellingham Ice Hawks	BCHL	54	5	8	13	150	—	—	—	—	—
1991–92	Kamloops Blazers	WHL	33	1	1	2	218	5	0	0	0	10
1992–93	Kamloops Blazers	WHL	62	6	10	16	217	13	0	4	4	34
1993–94	Kamloops Blazers	WHL	59	14	16	30	260	15	4	2	6	107
1993–94	Kamloops Blazers	MC	—	—	—	—	—	4	2	2	4	24
1994–95	Montreal Canadiens	NHL	3	0	0	0	4	—	—	—	—	—
1994–95	Fredericton Canadiens	AHL	55	6	12	18	234	12	1	1	2	50
1995–96	Montreal Canadiens	NHL	48	3	4	7	163	4	0	0	0	4
1995–96	Fredericton Canadiens	AHL	30	13	13	26	217	—	—	—	—	—
1996–97	Montreal Canadiens	NHL	56	4	2	6	114	—	—	—	—	—
1996–97	Hartford Whalers	NHL	8	1	1	2	10	—	—	—	—	—
1997–98	Carolina Hurricanes	NHL	7	0	1	1	22	—	—	—	—	—
1997–98	Ottawa Senators	NHL	46	5	3	8	96	11	1	0	1	8
1998–99	Ottawa Senators	NHL	38	1	6	7	65	—	—	—	—	—
1998–99	Chicago Blackhawks	NHL	4	0	0	0	14	—	—	—	—	—
1999–2000	Dallas Stars	NHL	32	2	1	3	62	−	−	−	−	−
1999–2000	Michigan K–Wings	IHL	31	5	2	7	78	—	—	—	—	—
2000–01	Worcester IceCats	AHL	21	9	8	17	60	—	—	—	—	—
NHL totals			242	16	18	34	550	15	1	0	1	12
