= Rob DiMaio =

Canadian ice hockey player (born 1968)

- Born: February 19, 1968 (age 58) Calgary, Alberta, Canada
- Height: 5 ft 10 in (178 cm)
- Weight: 190 lb (86 kg; 13 st 8 lb)
- Position: Right wing
- Shot: Right
- Played for: New York Islanders; Tampa Bay Lightning; Philadelphia Flyers; Boston Bruins; New York Rangers; Carolina Hurricanes; Dallas Stars
- NHL draft: 118th overall, 1987; New York Islanders
- Playing career: 1988–2006

Robert DiMaio (born February 19, 1968) is a Canadian former professional ice hockey player. He played in 894 National Hockey League (NHL) games with the New York Islanders, Tampa Bay Lightning, Philadelphia Flyers, Boston Bruins, New York Rangers, Carolina Hurricanes, and Dallas Stars. He is currently serves as the Ottawa Senators director of player personnel and director of professional scouting. DiMaio won the Stanley Cup with the Blues in 2019 as their director of player personnel.

== Playing career ==
DiMaio was first drafted by the New York Islanders 6th round, 118th overall in the 1987 NHL Entry Draft, and captained their minor league Springfield Indians affiliate to a Calder Cup championship in 1990; he was the final active NHL player of the Indians' franchise. Over the course of his career, he played for the Islanders, Boston Bruins, New York Rangers, Philadelphia Flyers, Carolina Hurricanes, Dallas Stars, and was one of the original Lightning players during Tampa's inaugural season. He suffered a severe concussion after a controversial hit by Montreal Canadiens forward Guillaume Latendresse during the 2006 preseason, which ended his career. He won the Italian championship in the 2005 with Hockey Club Milano Vipers.

== Transactions ==
- June 18, 1992 – Claimed by the Tampa Bay Lightning from the New York Islanders in the Expansion Draft.
- March 18, 1994 – Traded by the Tampa Bay Lightning to the Philadelphia Flyers in exchange for Jim Cummins and Philadelphia's 1995 4th round draft choice.
- September 30, 1996 – Claimed in the NHL Waiver Draft by the San Jose Sharks from the Philadelphia Flyers.
- September 30, 1996 – Traded by the San Jose Sharks to the Boston Bruins in exchange for Boston's 1997 5th round draft choice.
- March 10, 2000 – Traded by the Boston Bruins to the New York Rangers in exchange for Mike Knuble.
- August 4, 2000 – Traded by the New York Rangers, along with Darren Langdon, to the Carolina Hurricanes in exchange for Sandy McCarthy and Carolina's 2001 4th round draft choice.
- July 1, 2001 – Signed as free agent with the Dallas Stars.
- January 2005 – Signed with Hockey Club Milano Vipers.
- August 9, 2005 – Signed as a free agent with the Tampa Bay Lightning.

== Career statistics ==
			Regular Season					Playoffs
Season	Team	League	GP	G	A	Pts	PIM	GP	G	A	Pts	PIM
1984–85	Kamloops Blazers	WHL	55	9	18	27	29	7	1	3	4	2
1985–86	Kamloops Blazers	WHL	6	1	0	1	0	—	—	—	—	—
1985–86	Medicine Hat Tigers	WHL	55	20	30	50	82	22	6	6	12	39
1986–87	Medicine Hat Tigers	WHL	70	27	43	70	130	20	7	11	18	46
1987–88	Medicine Hat Tigers	WHL	54	47	44	91	120	14	12	19	31	59
1988–89	Springfield Indians	AHL	40	13	18	31	67	—	—	—	—	—
1988–89	New York Islanders	NHL	16	0	1	1	30	—	—	—	—	—
1989–90	Springfield Indians	AHL	54	25	27	52	69	16	4	7	11	45
1989–90	New York Islanders	NHL	7	0	0	0	2	1	1	0	1	4
1990–91	Capital District Islanders	AHL	12	3	4	7	22	—	—	—	—	—
1990–91	New York Islanders	NHL	1	0	0	0	0	—	—	—	—	—
1991–92	New York Islanders	NHL	50	5	2	7	43	—	—	—	—	—
1992–93	Tampa Bay Lightning	NHL	54	9	15	24	62	—	—	—	—	—
1993–94	Tampa Bay Lightning	NHL	39	8	7	15	40	—	—	—	—	—
1993–94	Philadelphia Flyers	NHL	14	3	5	8	6	—	—	—	—	—
1994–95	Philadelphia Flyers	NHL	36	3	1	4	53	15	2	4	6	4
1995–96	Philadelphia Flyers	NHL	59	6	15	21	58	3	0	0	0	0
1996–97	Boston Bruins	NHL	72	13	15	28	82	—	—	—	—	—
1997–98	Boston Bruins	NHL	79	10	17	27	82	6	1	0	1	8
1998–99	Boston Bruins	NHL	71	7	14	21	95	12	2	0	2	8
1999–00	Boston Bruins	NHL	50	5	16	21	42	—	—	—	—	—
1999–00	New York Rangers	NHL	12	1	3	4	8	—	—	—	—	—
2000–01	Carolina Hurricanes	NHL	74	6	18	24	54	6	0	0	0	4
2001–02	Utah Grizzlies	AHL	3	1	1	2	0	—	—	—	—	—
2001–02	Dallas Stars	NHL	61	6	6	12	25	—	—	—	—	—
2002–03	Dallas Stars	NHL	69	10	9	19	76	12	1	4	5	10
2003–04	Dallas Stars	NHL	69	9	15	24	52	5	0	1	1	2
2004–05	SCL Tigers	NLA	9	2	3	5	8	—	—	—	—	—
2004–05	HC Milano Vipers	Italy	9	4	8	12	4	15	—	—	—	—
2005–06	Tampa Bay Lightning	NHL	61	4	13	17	30	2	0	0	0	0
NHL totals			894	106	171	277	840	62	7	9	16	40
