= Murray Baron =

Canadian ice hockey player

- Born: June 1, 1967 (age 58) Prince George, British Columbia, Canada
- Height: 6 ft 3 in (191 cm)
- Weight: 235 lb (107 kg; 16 st 11 lb)
- Position: Defence
- Shot: Left
- Played for: Philadelphia Flyers; St. Louis Blues; Montreal Canadiens; Phoenix Coyotes; Vancouver Canucks
- NHL draft: 167th overall, 1986; Philadelphia Flyers
- Playing career: 1989–2004

Murray Roy Baron (born June 1, 1967) is a Canadian former professional ice hockey defenceman who played 15 seasons in the National Hockey League (NHL) for the Philadelphia Flyers, St. Louis Blues, Montreal Canadiens, Phoenix Coyotes, and Vancouver Canucks.

== Playing career ==
=== Philadelphia Flyers ===
Baron was drafted by the Philadelphia Flyers in the eighth round, 167th overall, of the 1986 NHL entry draft. He then attended the University of North Dakota for three years. Baron got his feet wet in the NHL playing 16 games with the Flyers in 1989–90 before playing 67 games the following year and establishing himself as an everyday NHLer. Shortly before the start of the 1991–92 season, Baron was part of a deal that saw him and long-time Flyer Ron Sutter traded to the St. Louis Blues for Rod Brind'Amour and Dan Quinn.

=== St. Louis Blues ===
For the next five seasons in St. Louis, Baron built a reputation as a bruising physical defenceman. Early on in the 1996–97 season, Baron was part of a blockbuster trade that sent him and Shayne Corson, along with a 5th-round draft pick to the Montreal Canadiens in exchange for Pierre Turgeon, Craig Conroy and Rory Fitzpatrick.

=== Montreal Canadiens ===
Baron's time with the Canadiens proved to be short-lived, and after just 60 games, he was on the move again, this time off to the Phoenix Coyotes in a deal for fellow defenseman Dave Manson.

=== Phoenix Coyotes ===
Baron would play just 63-games with the Coyotes over the next two seasons before he was changing addresses again, signing on with the Vancouver Canucks as a free agent.

=== Vancouver Canucks ===
In Vancouver, Baron finally found some stability setting in on the Canucks blue line and spending the next five seasons with the team and serving as their alternate captain. Following the 2002–03 season, Baron left Vancouver as a free agent.

=== Return to St. Louis ===
With time running out in his career, the 37-year-old blue liner signed a one-year deal to return to the St. Louis Blues. Baron scored one goal and added five assists in 80 games and retired from the NHL following the season.

== Coaching career ==
In 2011, Baron began his coaching career as an assistant coach with the Kootenay International Junior Hockey League's Kamloops Storm. He also coaches for Kamloops Minor Hockey.

== Career statistics ==
=== Regular season and playoffs ===
			Regular season					Playoffs
Season	Team	League	GP	G	A	Pts	PIM	GP	G	A	Pts	PIM
1984–85	Vernon Lakers	BCHL	37	5	9	14	93	—	—	—	—	—
1985–86	Vernon Lakers	BCHL	46	12	32	44	179	—	—	—	—	—
1986–87	North Dakota Fighting Sioux	WCHA	41	4	10	14	62	—	—	—	—	—
1987–88	North Dakota Fighting Sioux	WCHA	41	1	10	11	95	—	—	—	—	—
1988–89	North Dakota Fighting Sioux	WCHA	40	2	6	8	92	—	—	—	—	—
1988–89	Hershey Bears	AHL	9	0	3	3	8	—	—	—	—	—
1989–90	Hershey Bears	AHL	50	0	10	10	101	—	—	—	—	—
1989–90	Philadelphia Flyers	NHL	16	2	2	4	12	—	—	—	—	—
1990–91	Hershey Bears	AHL	6	2	3	5	0	—	—	—	—	—
1990–91	Philadelphia Flyers	NHL	67	8	8	16	74	—	—	—	—	—
1991–92	St. Louis Blues	NHL	67	3	8	11	94	2	0	0	0	2
1992–93	St. Louis Blues	NHL	53	2	2	4	59	11	0	0	0	12
1993–94	St. Louis Blues	NHL	77	5	9	14	123	4	0	0	0	10
1994–95	St. Louis Blues	NHL	39	0	5	5	93	7	1	1	2	2
1995–96	St. Louis Blues	NHL	82	2	9	11	190	13	1	0	1	20
1996–97	St. Louis Blues	NHL	11	0	2	2	1	—	—	—	—	—
1996–97	Montreal Canadiens	NHL	60	1	5	6	107	—	—	—	—	—
1996–97	Phoenix Coyotes	NHL	8	0	0	0	4	1	0	0	0	0
1997–98	Phoenix Coyotes	NHL	45	1	5	6	106	6	0	2	2	6
1998–99	Vancouver Canucks	NHL	81	2	6	8	115	—	—	—	—	—
1999–00	Vancouver Canucks	NHL	81	2	10	12	67	—	—	—	—	—
2000–01	Vancouver Canucks	NHL	82	3	8	11	63	4	0	0	0	0
2001–02	Vancouver Canucks	NHL	61	1	6	7	68	6	0	1	1	10
2002–03	Vancouver Canucks	NHL	78	2	4	6	62	14	0	4	4	10
2003–04	St. Louis Blues	NHL	80	1	5	6	61	5	0	0	0	6
NHL totals			988	35	94	129	1309	73	2	8	10	78
