= Stu Barnes =

Canadian ice hockey player (born 1970)

- Born: December 25, 1970 (age 55) Spruce Grove, Alberta, Canada
- Height: 5 ft 11 in (180 cm)
- Weight: 174 lb (79 kg; 12 st 6 lb)
- Position: Centre
- Shot: Right
- Played for: Winnipeg Jets; Florida Panthers; Pittsburgh Penguins; Buffalo Sabres; Dallas Stars
- National team: Canada
- NHL draft: 4th overall, 1989; Winnipeg Jets
- Playing career: 1991–2008

Stuart Douglas Barnes (born December 25, 1970) is a Canadian former professional ice hockey forward. He played 16 seasons at centre in the NHL with the Winnipeg Jets, Florida Panthers, Pittsburgh Penguins, Buffalo Sabres, and Dallas Stars. He has an arena named after him in Spruce Grove, Alberta, where he was born. Barnes was an assistant coach with the Dallas Stars. As of 2021, he is the head coach and co-owner of the Tri-City Americans in the Western Hockey League.

== Playing career ==
Barnes was drafted fourth overall by the Winnipeg Jets in the 1989 NHL entry draft. On November 25, 1993, the Jets traded him along with a sixth round selection (previously acquired from the St. Louis Blues; Chris Kibermanis) in 1994 to the Florida Panthers for Randy Gilhen. In Florida, he was among the leaders on the teams, who helped carry the Panthers to the 1996 Stanley Cup Final, facing the Colorado Avalanche. Then on November 19, 1996, the Pittsburgh Penguins traded Chris Wells to the Panthers for Barnes and Jason Woolley. The trade to the Penguins has been considered the worst in Panthers history.

In 1999, Barnes was traded to the Buffalo Sabres for Matthew Barnaby. In Buffalo, he went to the Finals again, this time against Dallas, only to lose on a triple-overtime goal by Brett Hull. He served as the captain for the Sabres before being traded to the Stars in 2003 for Michael Ryan and a second-round draft pick in the 2003 NHL entry draft. When Mike Modano was injured during the 2006–07 season, Barnes served as an alternate captain of the Stars. He also served as an alternate captain for most of the 2007–08 season due to Sergei Zubov's absence from the line-up. Barnes announced his retirement as a player on August 28, 2008, and joined the Stars as an assistant coach for three seasons before becoming a hockey operations consultant.

Barnes left the Stars front office after the 2012–13 season, and later served in a dual capacity as the Tri-City Americans co-owner in the Western Hockey League and as the head coach of the Okanagan Academy Prep hockey team. In 2017, Barnes returned to the Dallas Stars organization as an assistant coach.

== Career statistics ==
=== Regular season and playoffs ===
			Regular season					Playoffs
Season	Team	League	GP	G	A	Pts	PIM	GP	G	A	Pts	PIM
1986–87	St. Albert Saints	AJHL	53	41	34	75	103	19	7	15	22	6
1987–88	New Westminster Bruins	WHL	71	37	64	101	88	5	2	3	5	6
1988–89	Tri-City Americans	WHL	70	59	82	141	117	7	6	5	11	10
1989–90	Tri-City Americans	WHL	63	52	92	144	165	7	1	5	6	26
1990–91	Canadian National Team	Intl	52	22	27	49	68	—	—	—	—	—
1991–92	Moncton Hawks	AHL	30	13	20	33	10	11	3	9	12	6
1991–92	Winnipeg Jets	NHL	46	8	9	17	26	—	—	—	—	—
1992–93	Moncton Hawks	AHL	42	23	31	54	58	—	—	—	—	—
1992–93	Winnipeg Jets	NHL	38	12	10	22	10	6	1	3	4	2
1993–94	Winnipeg Jets	NHL	18	5	4	9	8	—	—	—	—	—
1993–94	Florida Panthers	NHL	59	18	20	38	30	—	—	—	—	—
1994–95	Florida Panthers	NHL	41	10	19	29	8	—	—	—	—	—
1995–96	Florida Panthers	NHL	72	19	25	44	46	22	6	10	16	4
1996–97	Florida Panthers	NHL	19	2	8	10	10	—	—	—	—	—
1996–97	Pittsburgh Penguins	NHL	62	17	22	39	16	5	0	1	1	0
1997–98	Pittsburgh Penguins	NHL	78	30	35	65	30	6	3	3	6	2
1998–99	Pittsburgh Penguins	NHL	64	20	12	32	20	—	—	—	—	—
1998–99	Buffalo Sabres	NHL	17	0	4	4	10	21	7	3	10	6
1999–00	Buffalo Sabres	NHL	82	20	25	45	16	5	3	0	3	2
2000–01	Buffalo Sabres	NHL	75	19	24	43	26	13	4	4	8	2
2001–02	Buffalo Sabres	NHL	68	17	31	48	26	—	—	—	—	—
2002–03	Buffalo Sabres	NHL	68	11	21	32	20	—	—	—	—	—
2002–03	Dallas Stars	NHL	13	2	5	7	8	12	2	3	5	0
2003–04	Dallas Stars	NHL	77	11	18	29	18	5	0	0	0	0
2005–06	Dallas Stars	NHL	78	15	21	36	44	5	1	1	2	0
2006–07	Dallas Stars	NHL	82	13	12	25	40	7	1	3	4	4
2007–08	Dallas Stars	NHL	79	12	11	23	26	9	2	1	3	2
NHL totals			1,136	261	336	597	438	116	30	32	62	24

=== International ===
Year	Team	Event	Result	GP	G	A	Pts	PIM
1990	Canada	WJC	1st place, gold medalist(s)	7	2	4	6	6
Junior totals				7	2	4	6	6

== Awards and honours ==
Award	Year
AJHL
Rookie of the Year	1986–87
WHL
Jim Piggott Memorial Trophy (Rookie of the Year)	1987–88
West Second All-Star Team	1987–88, 1988–89
Four Broncos Memorial Trophy (MVP)	1988–89

== Transactions ==
- On June 17, 1989, the Winnipeg Jets selected Stu Barnes in the first round (#4 overall) of the 1989 NHL draft.
- On November 25, 1993, the Winnipeg Jets traded Stu Barnes and a 1994 sixth-round pick to the Florida Panthers in exchange for Randy Gilhen and a 1994 fourth-round pick.
- On July 19, 1994, the Florida Panthers re-signed Stu Barnes to a multi-year contract.
- On July 16, 1996, the Florida Panthers signed Stu Barnes to a multi-year contract.
- On November 19, 1996, the Florida Panthers traded Stu Barnes and Jason Woolley to the Pittsburgh Penguins in exchange for Chris Wells.
- On June 20, 1998, the Pittsburgh Penguins re-signed Stu Barnes.
- On March 11, 1999, the Pittsburgh Penguins traded Stu Barnes to the Buffalo Sabres in exchange for Matthew Barnaby.
- On September 23, 1999, the Buffalo Sabres re-signed restricted free agent Stu Barnes to a multi-year contract.
- On March 10, 2003, the Buffalo Sabres traded Stu Barnes to the Dallas Stars in exchange for Michael Ryan and a 2003 second-round pick (#65 - Branislav Fabry).
- On August 3, 2004, the Dallas Stars re-signed Stu Barnes to a 2-year contract extension.
- On June 7, 2007, the Dallas Stars re-signed Stu Barnes to a 1-year contract.
- On August 28, 2008 Stu Barnes announced his retirement and was hired as assistant coach of the Dallas Stars for a 2-year contract.
- On July 13, 2010 Stu Barnes was re-signed as assistant coach of the Dallas Stars for a 2-year contract.

== See also ==
- List of NHL players with 1,000 games played

Awards and achievements
Preceded by Teemu Selänne	Winnipeg Jets first-round draft pick 1989	Succeeded by Keith Tkachuk
Preceded by Michael Peca	Buffalo Sabres captain 2001–03	Succeeded by Miroslav Satan rotating captaincy started
