= Mats Lindgren =

Swedish ice hockey player (born 1974)

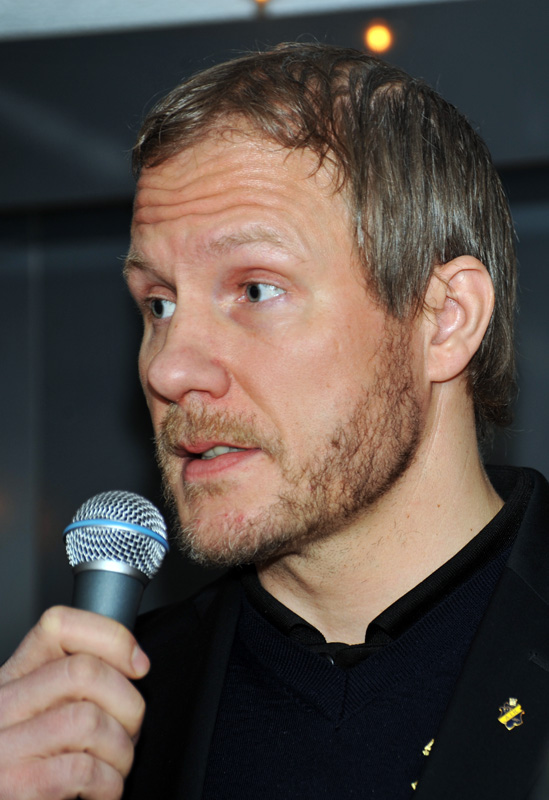
- Lindgren in January 2013
- Born: October 1, 1974 (age 52) Skellefteå, Sweden
- Height: 6 ft 2 in (188 cm)
- Weight: 200 lb (91 kg; 14 st 4 lb)
- Position: Centre
- Shot: Left
- Played for: Edmonton Oilers; New York Islanders; Vancouver Canucks
- National team: Sweden
- NHL draft: 15th overall, 1993; Winnipeg Jets
- Playing career: 1993–2003

Mats Anders Lindgren (born 1 October 1974) is a Swedish former professional ice hockey forward. He was selected in the first round of the 1993 NHL entry draft, 15th overall, by the Winnipeg Jets, although he never had the opportunity to play for them.

Lindgren represented Sweden at the 1998 Winter Olympics in Nagano, Japan.

After his professional career ended he moved back to his hometown of Skellefteå, Sweden where he became assistant coach for Skellefteå AIK.

He now does skill development at North Shore Winter Club.

== Career statistics ==
=== Regular season and playoffs ===
			Regular season					Playoffs
Season	Team	League	GP	G	A	Pts	PIM	GP	G	A	Pts	PIM
1990–91	Skellefteå AIK	SWE.2	10	0	1	1	0	—	—	—	—	—
1991–92	Skellefteå AIK	SWE.2	29	14	8	22	14	3	3	2	5	2
1992–93	Skellefteå AIK	SWE.2	32	20	18	38	18	3	0	0	0	2
1993–94	Färjestad BK	SEL	22	11	6	17	26	—	—	—	—	—
1993–94	Färjestad BK	Allsv	18	9	6	15	4	3	5	1	6	2
1994–95	Färjestad BK	SEL	37	17	15	32	20	3	0	0	0	4
1995–96	Cape Breton Oilers	AHL	13	7	5	12	6	—	—	—	—	—
1996–97	Edmonton Oilers	NHL	69	11	14	25	12	12	0	4	4	0
1996–97	Hamilton Bulldogs	AHL	9	6	7	13	6	—	—	—	—	—
1997–98	Edmonton Oilers	NHL	82	13	13	26	42	12	1	1	2	10
1998–99	Edmonton Oilers	NHL	48	5	12	17	22	—	—	—	—	—
1998–99	New York Islanders	NHL	12	5	3	8	2	—	—	—	—	—
1999–2000	New York Islanders	NHL	43	9	7	16	24	—	—	—	—	—
2000–01	New York Islanders	NHL	20	3	4	7	10	—	—	—	—	—
2001–02	New York Islanders	NHL	59	3	12	15	16	—	—	—	—	—
2002–03	Vancouver Canucks	NHL	54	5	9	14	18	—	—	—	—	—
2002–03	Manitoba Moose	AHL	4	0	1	1	6	—	—	—	—	—
SWE.2 totals			71	34	27	61	32	6	3	2	5	4
SEL totals			59	28	21	49	46	3	0	0	0	4
NHL totals			387	54	74	128	146	24	1	5	6	10

=== International ===
Year	Team	Event	GP	G	A	Pts	PIM
1991	Sweden	EJC	6	2	0	2	0
1992	Sweden	EJC	6	2	2	4	10
1993	Sweden	WJC	7	1	2	3	8
1994	Sweden	WJC	7	5	4	9	2
1998	Sweden	OG	4	0	0	0	2
Junior totals			26	10	8	18	20
Senior totals			4	0	0	0	2

Preceded by Sergei Bautin	Winnipeg Jets first-round draft pick 1993	Succeeded by Shane Doan
