= Kevin Bolibruck =

Canadian ice hockey player

Kevin Bolibruck (born February 8, 1977) is a former Canadian professional ice hockey player. After playing professionally in Canada and the U.S.A., he moved to Europe in 2003 and latterly was a member of Sport Ghiaccio Pontebba in the Italian Serie A Hockey League and a member of the British Elite Ice Hockey League.

== Playing career ==
Bolibruck was born in Peterborough, Ontario, but grew up and played minor hockey in Thorold, Ontario. He played junior hockey for his hometown Peterborough Petes from 1994 until 1997. His play attracted the attention of pro scouts and he was drafted by the Ottawa Senators in the 1995 NHL entry draft. Bolibruck was drafted in the 1997 Draft, this time by the Edmonton Oilers. He played a season with the Canadian National team in 1997–98 before joining the Oilers' American Hockey League (AHL) affiliate Hamilton Bulldogs in 1998. He played until 2003 in the AHL, with Hamilton, the Rochester Americans, Houston Aeros and the Bridgeport Sound Tigers before moving to Europe. He played for the Sheffield Steelers in England before joining Herning IK in Denmark, Ilves Tampere in Finland, the Augsburger Panthers in Germany, Vålerenga Ishockey in Norway and most recently Pontebba in Italy. Bolibruck last played full-time professionally for the British Elite Ice Hockey League as a member of the Sheffield Steelers in the 2010/2011 season. Bolibruck now lives in Pelham, Ontario, Canada with his family.

== Education ==
Bolibruck graduated with an MBA from The University of Sheffield in the UK while also full-time engaged as a professional hockey player in Europe.

== Business & Community Involvements ==
He serves as Treasurer of the Board of Directors of a federal registered not-for profit charity established in 2000 dedicated to helping steady humanity, building emotionally healthy communities and encouraging people to embrace hope and say 'no' to suicide.
