= 1996–97 NHL season =

National Hockey League season

- League: National Hockey League
- Sport: Ice hockey
- Duration: October 4, 1996 – June 7, 1997
- Games: 82
- Teams: 26
- TV partner(s): CBC, TSN, SRC (Canada); ESPN, Fox (United States)

Draft
- Top draft pick: Chris Phillips
- Picked by: Ottawa Senators

Regular season
- Presidents' Trophy: Colorado Avalanche
- Season MVP: Dominik Hasek (Sabres)
- Top scorer: Mario Lemieux (Penguins)

Playoffs
- Playoffs MVP: Mike Vernon (Red Wings)

Stanley Cup
- Champions: Detroit Red Wings
- Runners-up: Philadelphia Flyers

NHL seasons
- 1995–96 1997–98

The 1996–97 NHL season was the 80th regular season of the National Hockey League. The Winnipeg Jets were deactivated, with their assets transferring to Phoenix, Arizona, becoming the Phoenix Coyotes. The Stanley Cup winners were the Detroit Red Wings, who swept the Philadelphia Flyers in four games and won the Stanley Cup for the first time in 42 years.

The regular season saw a decline in scoring and rise in the number of shutouts to an all-time record of 127. This trend continued into the playoffs, during which an all-time record of 18 shutouts were recorded. Only two players, Mario Lemieux and Teemu Selanne, reached the 100-point plateau during the regular season (compared with 12 who reached the plateau in 1995–96). Many regulatory factors, including ruling changes that resulted in fewer power plays, more calls of the skate-in-the-crease rule, fewer shots on goal and more injuries to star players than the season before, contributed to the reduction in scoring and skyrocketing in shutouts.

This was the first time in 30 years—and in the entire expansion era—that the Boston Bruins had a losing record and missed the playoffs, ending a still-unsurpassed North American professional sports streak of 29-straight seasons in the playoffs.

== League business ==
=== Winnipeg Jets deactivation and Hartford Whalers relocation ===
Prior to the season, the Winnipeg Jets were deactivated, with their assets being transferred to a new expansion team in Phoenix, Arizona, named the Coyotes. While initially considered a relocation, in 2026, the NHL retconned the Coyotes as an expansion team for this season, while the Jets' records and statistics pre-1996 were given to the current Jets (formerly the Atlanta Thrashers from 1999 to 2011).

On March 26, 1997, the Hartford Whalers announced that they would move from Connecticut following the 1996–97 season. On May 5, they announced that starting in the 1997–98 NHL season, they would be known as the Carolina Hurricanes.

=== Entry draft ===
The 1996 NHL entry draft was held at the Kiel Center in St. Louis, Missouri, on June 22. Chris Phillips was selected first overall by the Ottawa Senators.

=== Rule changes ===
- The maximum stick length was increased from the 60-inch limit set in 1985–86 to 63 inches.
- Offside rules were clarified, requiring all players to clear their opponents' zone before they can shoot the puck back into that zone.
- Craig MacTavish, the last active NHL player who played without a protective helmet, retired after this 1996–97 season. MacTavish was the last active player who had been grandfathered under the rule requiring them to be worn because he had signed a pro contract before the rule was established on June 1, 1979. The first player to ever wear a helmet was George Owen in the 1928–29 season.

== Arena changes ==
- The Buffalo Sabres moved from Buffalo Memorial Auditorium to Marine Midland Arena, with Marine Midland Bank acquiring the naming rights.
- The New Jersey Devils' home arena, Brendan Byrne Arena, was renamed Continental Airlines Arena in January 1996 as part of a new naming rights deal with Continental Airline.
- The relocated Phoenix Coyotes moved from Winnipeg Arena to America West Arena.
- The Philadelphia Flyers moved from the CoreStates Spectrum to the CoreStates Center, with CoreStates Financial Corporation also acquiring the naming rights.
- The Tampa Bay Lightning moved from the Thunderdome in St. Petersburg, Florida to the Ice Palace in Tampa, Florida.
- The Washington Capitals' home arena, the USAir Arena, was renamed US Airways Arena after USAir rebranded to US Airways.

== Regular season ==
=== All-Star Game ===
The All-Star Game was held on January 18, 1997, at San Jose Arena in San Jose, home of the San Jose Sharks.

=== Highlights ===
The Boston Bruins recorded the league's worst record, missing the playoffs for the first time in 30 seasons and ending the longest consecutive playoff streak ever recorded in the history of North American professional sports.

On November 16, 1996, the eight-sided scoreboard at the Marine Midland Arena in Buffalo crashed to the ice during a maintenance check. The accident occurred only 90 minutes after the visiting Boston Bruins players had conducted their morning practice. No-one was injured, but the game between the Buffalo Sabres and the Bruins was postponed.

A large-scale on-ice brawl occurred during the Colorado Avalanche–Detroit Red Wings game on March 26. The game featured 18 fighting major penalties and 144 minutes in penalties.

=== Final standings ===
==== Eastern Conference ====
Atlantic Division
No.	CR		GP	W	L	T	GF	GA	Pts
1	1	**New Jersey Devils**	82	45	23	14	231	182	104
2	3	**Philadelphia Flyers**	82	45	24	13	274	217	103
3	4	**Florida Panthers**	82	35	28	19	221	201	89
4	5	**New York Rangers**	82	38	34	10	258	231	86
5	9	Washington Capitals	82	33	40	9	214	231	75
6	11	Tampa Bay Lightning	82	32	40	10	217	247	74
7	12	New York Islanders	82	29	41	12	240	250	70

Northeast Division
No.	CR		GP	W	L	T	GF	GA	Pts
1	2	**Buffalo Sabres**	82	40	30	12	237	208	92
2	6	**Pittsburgh Penguins**	82	38	36	8	285	280	84
3	7	**Ottawa Senators**	82	31	36	15	226	234	77
4	8	**Montreal Canadiens**	82	31	36	15	249	276	77
5	10	Hartford Whalers	82	32	39	11	226	256	75
6	13	Boston Bruins	82	26	47	9	234	300	61

Eastern Conference
R		Div	GP	W	L	T	GF	GA	Pts
**1**	**New Jersey Devils**	**ATL**	**82**	**45**	**23**	**14**	**231**	**182**	**104**
**2**	**Buffalo Sabres**	**NE**	**82**	**40**	**30**	**12**	**237**	**208**	**92**
**3**	**Philadelphia Flyers**	**ATL**	**82**	**45**	**24**	**13**	**274**	**217**	**103**
**4**	**Florida Panthers**	**ATL**	**82**	**35**	**28**	**19**	**221**	**201**	**89**
**5**	**New York Rangers**	**ATL**	**82**	**38**	**34**	**10**	**258**	**231**	**86**
**6**	**Pittsburgh Penguins**	**NE**	**82**	**38**	**36**	**8**	**285**	**280**	**84**
**7**	**Ottawa Senators**	**NE**	**82**	**31**	**36**	**15**	**226**	**234**	**77**
**8**	**Montreal Canadiens**	**NE**	**82**	**31**	**36**	**15**	**249**	**276**	**77**
9	Washington Capitals	ATL	82	33	40	9	214	231	75
10	Hartford Whalers	NE	82	32	39	11	226	256	75
11	Tampa Bay Lightning	ATL	82	32	40	10	217	247	74
12	New York Islanders	ATL	82	29	41	12	240	250	70
13	Boston Bruins	NE	82	26	47	9	234	300	61

Divisions: ATL – Atlantic, NE – Northeast

bold – Qualified for playoffs

==== Western Conference ====
Central Division
No.	CR		GP	W	L	T	GF	GA	Pts
1	2	**Dallas Stars**	82	48	26	8	252	198	104
2	3	**Detroit Red Wings**	82	38	26	18	253	197	94
3	5	**Phoenix Coyotes**	82	38	37	7	240	243	83
4	6	**St. Louis Blues**	82	36	35	11	236	239	83
5	8	**Chicago Blackhawks**	82	34	35	13	223	210	81
6	11	Toronto Maple Leafs	82	30	44	8	230	273	68

Pacific Division
No.	CR		GP	W	L	T	GF	GA	Pts
1	1	**Colorado Avalanche**	82	49	24	9	277	205	107
2	4	**Mighty Ducks of Anaheim**	82	36	33	13	243	231	85
3	7	**Edmonton Oilers**	82	36	37	9	252	247	81
4	9	Vancouver Canucks	82	35	40	7	257	273	77
5	10	Calgary Flames	82	32	41	9	214	239	73
6	12	Los Angeles Kings	82	28	43	11	214	268	67
7	13	San Jose Sharks	82	27	47	8	211	278	62

Western Conference
R		Div	GP	W	L	T	GF	GA	Pts
**1**	**p – Colorado Avalanche**	**PAC**	**82**	**49**	**24**	**9**	**277**	**205**	**107**
**2**	**Dallas Stars**	**CEN**	**82**	**48**	**26**	**8**	**252**	**198**	**104**
**3**	**Detroit Red Wings**	**CEN**	**82**	**38**	**26**	**18**	**253**	**197**	**94**
**4**	**Mighty Ducks of Anaheim**	**PAC**	**82**	**36**	**33**	**13**	**245**	**233**	**85**
**5**	**Phoenix Coyotes**	**CEN**	**82**	**38**	**37**	**7**	**240**	**243**	**83**
**6**	**St. Louis Blues**	**CEN**	**82**	**36**	**35**	**11**	**236**	**239**	**83**
**7**	**Edmonton Oilers**	**PAC**	**82**	**36**	**37**	**9**	**252**	**247**	**81**
**8**	**Chicago Blackhawks**	**CEN**	**82**	**34**	**35**	**13**	**223**	**210**	**81**
9	Vancouver Canucks	PAC	82	35	40	7	257	273	77
10	Calgary Flames	PAC	82	32	41	9	214	239	73
11	Toronto Maple Leafs	CEN	82	30	44	8	230	273	68
12	Los Angeles Kings	PAC	82	28	43	11	214	268	67
13	San Jose Sharks	PAC	82	27	47	8	211	278	62

Divisions: CEN – Central, PAC – Pacific

bold – Qualified for playoffs; p – Won Presidents' Trophy

Note: W = Wins, L = Losses, T = Ties, GF= Goals For, GA = Goals Against, Pts = Points

== Playoffs ==
=== Bracket ===
The top eight teams in each conference made the playoffs, with the two division winners seeded 1–2 based on regular season records, and the six remaining teams seeded 3–8. In each round, teams competed in a best-of-seven series (scores in the bracket indicate the number of games won in each best-of-seven series). The NHL used "re-seeding" instead of a fixed bracket playoff system. During the first three rounds, the highest remaining seed in each conference was matched against the lowest remaining seed, the second-highest remaining seed played the second-lowest remaining seed, and so forth. The higher-seeded team was awarded home-ice advantage. The two conference winners then advanced to the Stanley Cup Finals.

Conference quarterfinals	Conference semifinals
1	New Jersey	4
8	Montreal	1
1	New Jersey	1
5	NY Rangers	4
2	Buffalo	4
7	Ottawa	3
Eastern Conference
3	Philadelphia	4
6	Pittsburgh	1
2	Buffalo	1
3	Philadelphia	4
4	Florida	1
5	NY Rangers	4
1	Colorado	4
8	Chicago	2
1	Colorado	4
7	Edmonton	1
2	Dallas	3
7	Edmonton	4
Western Conference
3	Detroit	4
6	St. Louis	2
3	Detroit	4
4	Anaheim	0
4	Anaheim	4
5	Phoenix	3

Conference finals
5	NY Rangers	1
3	Philadelphia	4
1	Colorado	2
3	Detroit	4

Stanley Cup Final
E3	Philadelphia	0
W3	Detroit	4

== Awards ==
The NHL Awards presentation took place on June 19, 1997.

Presidents' Trophy:	Colorado Avalanche
Prince of Wales Trophy: (Eastern Conference playoff champion)	Philadelphia Flyers
Clarence S. Campbell Bowl: (Western Conference playoff champion)	Detroit Red Wings
Art Ross Trophy:	Mario Lemieux, Pittsburgh Penguins
Bill Masterton Memorial Trophy:	Tony Granato, San Jose Sharks
Calder Memorial Trophy:	Bryan Berard, New York Islanders
Conn Smythe Trophy:	Mike Vernon, Detroit Red Wings
Frank J. Selke Trophy:	Michael Peca, Buffalo Sabres
Hart Memorial Trophy:	Dominik Hasek, Buffalo Sabres
Jack Adams Award:	Ted Nolan, Buffalo Sabres
James Norris Memorial Trophy:	Brian Leetch, New York Rangers
King Clancy Memorial Trophy:	Trevor Linden, Vancouver Canucks
Lady Byng Memorial Trophy:	Paul Kariya, Mighty Ducks of Anaheim
Lester B. Pearson Award:	Dominik Hasek, Buffalo Sabres
NHL Plus-Minus Award:	John LeClair, Philadelphia Flyers
Vezina Trophy:	Dominik Hasek, Buffalo Sabres
William M. Jennings Trophy:	Martin Brodeur/Mike Dunham, New Jersey Devils

=== All-Star teams ===
First Team	Position	Second Team
Dominik Hasek, Buffalo Sabres	G	Martin Brodeur, New Jersey Devils
Brian Leetch, New York Rangers	D	Chris Chelios, Chicago Blackhawks
Sandis Ozolinsh, Colorado Avalanche	D	Scott Stevens, New Jersey Devils
Mario Lemieux, Pittsburgh Penguins	C	Wayne Gretzky, New York Rangers
Teemu Selanne, Mighty Ducks of Anaheim	RW	Jaromir Jagr, Pittsburgh Penguins
Paul Kariya, Mighty Ducks of Anaheim	LW	John LeClair, Philadelphia Flyers

== Player statistics ==
=== Scoring leaders ===
Regular season

Player	Team	GP	G	A	Pts
Mario Lemieux	Pittsburgh	76	50	72	122
Teemu Selanne	Anaheim	78	51	58	109
Paul Kariya	Anaheim	69	44	55	99
John LeClair	Philadelphia	82	50	47	97
Wayne Gretzky	NY Rangers	82	25	72	97
Jaromir Jagr	Pittsburgh	63	47	48	95
Mats Sundin	Toronto	82	41	53	94
Zigmund Palffy	NY Islanders	80	48	42	90
Ron Francis	Pittsburgh	81	27	63	90
Brendan Shanahan	Hartford/ Detroit	81	47	41	88

Source: NHL.

Playoffs

Player	Team	GP	G	A	Pts
Eric Lindros	Phi	19	12	14	26
Joe Sakic	Col	17	8	17	25
Claude Lemieux	Col	17	13	10	23
Valeri Kamensky	Col	17	8	14	22
Rod Brind'Amour	Phi	19	13	8	21
John LeClair	Phi	19	9	12	21
Wayne Gretzky	NYR	15	10	10	20
Sergei Fedorov	Det	20	8	12	20
Brendan Shanahan	Det	20	9	8	17
Peter Forsberg	Col	14	5	12	17
Sandis Ozolinsh	Col	17	4	13	17

Note: GP = Games Played, G = Goals, A = Assists, Pts = Points

=== Leading goaltenders ===
Regular season

Player	Team	GP	MIN	GA	SO	GAA	SV%
Martin Brodeur	New Jersey	67	3838	120	10	1.88	.927
Andy Moog	Dallas	48	2738	98	3	2.15	.913
Jeff Hackett	Chicago	41	2473	89	2	2.16	.927
Dominik Hasek	Buffalo	67	4037	153	5	2.27	.930
John Vanbiesbrouck	Florida	57	3347	128	2	2.29	.919
Chris Osgood	Detroit	47	2769	106	6	2.30	.910
Patrick Roy	Colorado	62	3698	143	7	2.32	.923
Mark Fitzpatrick	Florida	30	1680	66	0	2.36	.914
Mike Vernon	Detroit	33	1952	79	0	2.43	.899
Garth Snow	Philadelphia	35	1884	79	2	2.52	.903

== Coaches ==
=== Eastern Conference ===
- Boston Bruins: Steve Kasper
- Buffalo Sabres: Ted Nolan
- Florida Panthers: Doug MacLean
- Hartford Whalers: Paul Maurice
- Montreal Canadiens: Mario Tremblay
- New Jersey Devils: Jacques Lemaire
- New York Islanders: Mike Milbury and Rick Bowness
- New York Rangers: Colin Campbell
- Ottawa Senators: Jacques Martin
- Philadelphia Flyers: Terry Murray
- Pittsburgh Penguins: Eddie Johnston and Craig Patrick
- Tampa Bay Lightning: Terry Crisp
- Washington Capitals: Jim Schoenfeld

=== Western Conference ===
- Mighty Ducks of Anaheim: Ron Wilson
- Calgary Flames: Pierre Page
- Chicago Blackhawks: Craig Hartsburg
- Colorado Avalanche: Marc Crawford
- Dallas Stars: Ken Hitchcock
- Detroit Red Wings: Scotty Bowman
- Edmonton Oilers: Ron Low
- Los Angeles Kings: Larry Robinson
- Phoenix Coyotes: Don Hay
- San Jose Sharks: Al Sims and Darryl Sutter
- St. Louis Blues: Mike Keenan, Jim Roberts (interim) and Joel Quenneville
- Toronto Maple Leafs: Mike Murphy
- Vancouver Canucks: Tom Renney

== Milestones ==
=== Debuts ===
The following is a list of players of note who played their first NHL game in 1996–97 (listed with their first team, asterisk (*) marks debut in playoffs):

- Dwayne Roloson, Calgary Flames
- Roman Turek, Dallas Stars
- Tomas Holmstrom, Detroit Red Wings
- Mike Knuble, Detroit Red Wings
- Mike Grier, Edmonton Oilers
- Jean-Sebastien Giguere, Hartford Whalers
- Tomas Vokoun, Montreal Canadiens
- Bryan Berard, New York Islanders
- Todd Bertuzzi, New York Islanders
- Wade Redden, Ottawa Senators
- Vaclav Prospal, Philadelphia Flyers
- Dainius Zubrus, Philadelphia Flyers
- Patrick Lalime, Pittsburgh Penguins

=== Last games ===
The following is a list of players of note who played their last game in the NHL in 1996–97 (listed with their last team):

- Charlie Huddy, Buffalo Sabres
- Denis Savard, Chicago Blackhawks
- Sergei Makarov, Dallas Stars
- Neal Broten, Dallas Stars
- Mike Ramsey, Detroit Red Wings
- Vladimir Konstantinov, Detroit Red Wings
- Dale Hawerchuk, Philadelphia Flyers
- Brad McCrimmon, Phoenix Coyotes
- Joe Mullen, Pittsburgh Penguins
- Tim Hunter, San Jose Sharks
- Craig MacTavish, St. Louis Blues (the last helmetless player)
- Jay Wells, Tampa Bay Lightning
- Don Beaupre, Toronto Maple Leafs
- Dave McLlwain, New York Islanders
- Gary Leeman, St. Louis Blues

== Broadcasting ==
=== Canada ===
This was the ninth season that the league's Canadian national broadcast rights were split between TSN and Hockey Night in Canada on CBC. During the regular season, Saturday night games aired on CBC, while TSN primarily had Monday and Thursday night games. Coverage of the Stanley Cup playoffs was primarily on CBC, with TSN airing first round all-U.S. series.

=== United States ===
This was the third season of the league's five-year U.S. national broadcast rights deals with Fox and ESPN. Both ESPN and ESPN2 aired weeknight games throughout the regular season, and Fox had the All-Star Game and weekly regional telecasts on six selected weekend afternoons between January and March. During the first two rounds of the playoffs, ESPN and ESPN2 aired selected games, while Fox provided Sunday regional telecasts. Each U.S. team's regional broadcaster produced local coverage of first and second round games (except for those games on Fox). Fox's Sunday telecasts continued into the Conference Finals, while ESPN had the rest of the third round games. The Stanley Cup Finals were also split between Fox and ESPN.

== See also ==
- List of Stanley Cup champions
- 1996 NHL entry draft
- 1996–97 NHL transactions
- 47th National Hockey League All-Star Game
- National Hockey League All-Star Game
- NHL All-Rookie Team
- Lester Patrick Trophy
- 1996 World Cup of Hockey
- 1996 in sports
- 1997 in sports
