= 2002–03 Mighty Ducks of Anaheim season =

NHL team season

2002–03 Mighty Ducks of Anaheim
- Western Conference champions
- Division: 2nd Pacific
- Conference: 7th Western
- 2002–03 record: 40–27–9–6
- Home record: 22–10–7–2
- Road record: 18–17–2–4
- Goals for: 203
- Goals against: 193

Team information
- General manager: Bryan Murray
- Coach: Mike Babcock
- Captain: Paul Kariya
- Alternate captains: Keith Carney; Steve Rucchin
- Arena: Arrowhead Pond of Anaheim
- Average attendance: 13,988 (81.4%); Total: 573,506
- Minor league affiliate: Cincinnati Mighty Ducks

Team leaders
- Goals: Petr Sykora (34)
- Assists: Paul Kariya (56)
- Points: Paul Kariya (81)
- Penalty minutes: Kevin Sawyer (115)
- Plus/minus: Sandis Ozolinsh (+10); Samuel Pahlsson (+10)
- Wins: Jean-Sebastien Giguere (34)
- Goals against average: Martin Gerber (1.95)

The 2002–03 Mighty Ducks of Anaheim season was the Ducks' tenth season in franchise history. The club qualified for the Stanley Cup Final for the first time in franchise history, falling to the New Jersey Devils.

== Off season ==
After missing the play offs for the third time in a row, Anaheim made drastic changes in the summer, off the ice as well on the ice. GM Pierre Gauthier was fired after failing to acquire forwards to provide the necessary goal scoring. Brian Murray was promoted to the position of general manager and made a lot of changes. He hired their farm team's head coach Mike Babcock who stated in his first ever press conference that his team would work very hard and relentlessly. Murray's first big move at the 2002 draft was a trade with the New Jersey Devils : he traded defenceman Oleg Tverdovsky and forward Jeff Friesen in exchange for Petr Sykora, rookies Mike Commodore and Jean-Francois Damphousse, who saw some brief action last season as back-up goalie to Martin Brodeur. Additional free agent signings were veterans Adam Oates, Frederik Olausson and Jason Krog. Three rookies got regular roster spots : Kurt Sauer, Stanislav Chistov and Alexei Smirnov. Martin Gerber became the Mighty Ducks new back up goalie, having had a lot of experience as a starter in the Swedish league.

== Regular season ==
On February 12, 2003, Mike Leclerc scored just ten seconds into the overtime period to give the Mighty Ducks a 4–3 home win over the Calgary Flames. It would prove to be the fastest overtime goal scored during the 2002–03 regular season.

=== Final standings ===
Pacific Division
No.	CR		GP	W	L	T	OTL	GF	GA	Pts
1	1	**Dallas Stars**	82	46	17	15	4	245	169	111
2	7	**Mighty Ducks of Anaheim**	82	40	27	9	6	203	193	95
3	10	Los Angeles Kings	82	33	37	6	6	203	221	78
4	11	Phoenix Coyotes	82	31	35	11	5	204	230	78
5	14	San Jose Sharks	82	28	37	9	8	214	239	73

Note: CR = Conference rank; GP = Games played; W = Wins; L = Losses; T = Ties; OTL = Overtime loss; GF = Goals for; GA = Goals against; Pts = Points
Bolded teams qualified for the playoffs.

Western Conference
R		Div	GP	W	L	T	OTL	GF	GA	Pts
**1**	**Z-** Dallas Stars	**PA**	**82**	**46**	**17**	**15**	**4**	**245**	**169**	111
**2**	**Y-** Detroit Red Wings	**CE**	**82**	**48**	**20**	**10**	**4**	**269**	**203**	110
**3**	**Y-** Colorado Avalanche	**NW**	**82**	**42**	**19**	**13**	**8**	**251**	**194**	105
**4**	**X-** Vancouver Canucks	**NW**	**82**	**45**	**23**	**13**	**1**	**264**	**208**	104
**5**	**X-** St. Louis Blues	**CE**	**82**	**41**	**24**	**11**	**6**	**253**	**222**	99
**6**	**X-** Minnesota Wild	**NW**	**82**	**42**	**29**	**10**	**1**	**198**	**178**	95
**7**	**X-** Mighty Ducks of Anaheim	**PA**	**82**	**40**	**27**	**9**	**6**	**203**	**193**	95
**8**	**X-** Edmonton Oilers	**NW**	**82**	**36**	**26**	**11**	**9**	**231**	**230**	92
8.5
9	Chicago Blackhawks	CE	82	30	33	13	6	207	226	79
10	Los Angeles Kings	PA	82	33	37	6	6	203	221	78
11	Phoenix Coyotes	PA	82	31	35	11	5	204	230	78
12	Calgary Flames	NW	82	29	36	13	4	186	228	75
13	Nashville Predators	CE	82	27	35	13	7	183	206	74
14	San Jose Sharks	PA	82	28	37	9	8	214	239	73
15	Columbus Blue Jackets	CE	82	29	42	8	3	213	263	69

Divisions: PA – Pacific, CE – Central, NW – Northwest

Z – Clinched conference; Y – Clinched division; X – Clinched playoff spot

== Playoffs ==
=== Conference Quarterfinals ===
In what was a very large upset, the seventh-seed Mighty Ducks took a first-round series from the number-two seed and defending Stanley Cup champions, the Detroit Red Wings. The Mighty Ducks swept the Red Wings in four games to get revenge from 1997 and 1999, where the Mighty Ducks were swept by the Red Wings. In Game 1 of the series, when the game went to overtime, the sellout crowd at Joe Louis Arena thought the Wings had won the game thanks to a Luc Robitaille shot at 9:21. Some of the Detroit players had even left for the dressing room. However, after going to the video review, it was concluded Robitaille's shot ricocheted off the crossbar and the post, and the players were brought back to resume the game. Later, at 3:18 into the third overtime period, Paul Kariya scored the goal that would clinch a 2–1 win for Anaheim and a one-game lead in the series. Anaheim goaltender Jean-Sebastien Giguere faced 64 shots in game one. In Game 2, Anaheim came back from a 2–1 deficit by scoring two goals in the third period.

The Mighty Ducks won Game 3 at the Arrowhead Pond of Anaheim, 2–1, to push the Red Wings to the brink of elimination. The Mighty Ducks then won Game 4, a 3–2 overtime victory, with Steve Rucchin delivering the decisive goal 6:53 into overtime. The Red Wings became only the second defending Stanley Cup champions to be swept the following year in a four-game opening series.

=== Conference semifinals ===
The series opened at American Airlines Center in Dallas, where the heavily favored Stars and underdog Ducks engaged in an epic battle that took over 140 minutes and four overtimes to decide before Anaheim's Petr Sykora scored the game-winner 47 seconds into the fifth overtime, winning the game for the Ducks, 4–3. Dallas goaltender Marty Turco saw 54 shots while Anaheim's Jean-Sebastien Giguere saw 63. Game 2 saw another game tied after 60 minutes, but this time, Anaheim needed only 1:44 to win the game in the first overtime, 3–2, on a goal by Mike Leclerc. Dallas, much like Detroit in its first-round series against the Ducks, faced a 2–0 deficit headed to Anaheim.

Game 3 at Arrowhead Pond of Anaheim was a must-win for the Stars, and they came through, winning the game, 2–1, getting two clutch goals from Jere Lehtinen. But the Ducks refused to let the Stars back in the series, winning Game 4, 1–0, behind a 28-save shutout from Giguere. Not wanting to be eliminated in front of their home fans, a motivated Dallas team captured Game 5, 4–1. Unfortunately for the Stars, their bid to take the series to a Game 7 was denied when they were edged in Game 6, 4–3.

=== Conference final ===
In game one, Petr Sykora scored at 8:06 into double-overtime in a 1–0 Mighty Ducks victory. It was the Mighty Ducks' second shutout of the playoffs. Jean-Sebastien Giguere turned in a stellar performance in net for Anaheim, stopping all 39 shots he faced. For game two, the Wild played Dwayne Roloson instead of Manny Fernandez in net. As in game one, it was another shutout for Giguere as the Mighty Ducks won the game 2–0. Both goals were short-handed, and Giguere stopped all 24 shots he faced, making him 63-for-63 in the series. In game three, Giguere continued his goal-tending excellence, stopping all 35 shots he faced in a 4–0 Mighty Ducks victory that pushed the Wild to the brink of elimination. Giguere had now stopped the first 98 shots he saw in the series. In game four, The Mighty Ducks won the game, 2–1. Both goals came from Adam Oates, and the Mighty Ducks headed to their first Stanley Cup Final. The only good news for the Wild was that they avoided a fourth consecutive shutout, as Andrew Brunette scored the first Minnesota goal of the series. Still, Giguere was 122-for-123 in the series, a robust .992 save percentage.

== Schedule and results ==
=== Regular season ===
2002–03 regular season
October: 3–5–3–0 (home: 1–2–1–0; road: 2–3–2–0)

Game	Date	Score	Opponent	Record	Recap
1	October 10, 2002	4–3	@ St. Louis Blues	1–0–0–0	W
2	October 11, 2002	2–4	@ Dallas Stars	1–1–0–0	L
3	October 13, 2002	2–4	Detroit Red Wings	1–2–0–0	L
4	October 16, 2002	2–4	Los Angeles Kings	1–3–0–0	L
5	October 18, 2002	2–2 OT	Vancouver Canucks	1–3–1–0	T
6	October 20, 2002	3–2 OT	Colorado Avalanche	2–3–1–0	W
7	October 24, 2002	2–2 OT	@ Vancouver Canucks	2–3–2–0	T
8	October 26, 2002	3–4	@ Edmonton Oilers	2–4–2–0	L
9	October 28, 2002	2–5	@ Toronto Maple Leafs	2–5–2–0	L
10	October 29, 2002	2–2 OT	@ Montreal Canadiens	2–5–3–0	T
11	October 31, 2002	4–1	@ Boston Bruins	3–5–3–0	W

November: 5–2–3–3 (home: 2–2–3–0; road: 3–0–0–3)

Game	Date	Score	Opponent	Record	Recap
12	November 3, 2002	3–4	San Jose Sharks	3–6–3–0	L
13	November 6, 2002	2–1	Nashville Predators	4–6–3–0	W
14	November 8, 2002	3–2 OT	@ Colorado Avalanche	5–6–3–0	W
15	November 10, 2002	1–0	Minnesota Wild	6–6–3–0	W
16	November 12, 2002	2–3 OT	@ New Jersey Devils	6–6–3–1	OTL
17	November 14, 2002	3–2	@ Columbus Blue Jackets	7–6–3–1	W
18	November 15, 2002	1–2 OT	@ Detroit Red Wings	7–6–3–2	OTL
19	November 17, 2002	5–1	@ Atlanta Thrashers	8–6–3–2	W
20	November 19, 2002	2–3 OT	@ New York Rangers	8–6–3–3	OTL
21	November 22, 2002	0–4	Dallas Stars	8–7–3–3	L
22	November 24, 2002	4–4 OT	Florida Panthers	8–7–4–3	T
23	November 27, 2002	2–2 OT	Phoenix Coyotes	8–7–5–3	T
24	November 29, 2002	2–2 OT	Los Angeles Kings	8–7–6–3	T

December: 7–7–0–0 (home: 6–0–0–0; road: 1–7–0–0)

Game	Date	Score	Opponent	Record	Recap
25	December 1, 2002	3–2	Chicago Blackhawks	9–7–6–3	W
26	December 3, 2002	1–2	@ Detroit Red Wings	9–8–6–3	L
27	December 4, 2002	0–4	@ Buffalo Sabres	9–9–6–3	L
28	December 6, 2002	4–3	@ Chicago Blackhawks	10–9–6–3	W
29	December 8, 2002	3–0	Nashville Predators	11–9–6–3	W
30	December 11, 2002	3–0	Washington Capitals	12–9–6–3	W
31	December 15, 2002	5–0	Pittsburgh Penguins	13–9–6–3	W
32	December 18, 2002	5–2	St. Louis Blues	14–9–6–3	W
33	December 19, 2002	4–5	@ Los Angeles Kings	14–10–6–3	L
34	December 22, 2002	4–0	Phoenix Coyotes	15–10–6–3	W
35	December 26, 2002	1–4	@ San Jose Sharks	15–11–6–3	L
36	December 28, 2002	3–7	@ Vancouver Canucks	15–12–6–3	L
37	December 29, 2002	2–4	@ Calgary Flames	15–13–6–3	L
38	December 31, 2002	1–4	@ Minnesota Wild	15–14–6–3	L

January: 7–4–1–1 (home: 3–3–1–1; road: 4–1–0–0)

Game	Date	Score	Opponent	Record	Recap
39	January 3, 2003	0–1	Philadelphia Flyers	15–15–6–3	L
40	January 5, 2003	1–1 OT	Dallas Stars	15–15–7–3	T
41	January 8, 2003	0–1	Edmonton Oilers	15–16–7–3	L
42	January 9, 2003	5–3	@ Colorado Avalanche	16–16–7–3	W
43	January 12, 2003	2–1	St. Louis Blues	17–16–7–3	W
44	January 15, 2003	4–3	@ Columbus Blue Jackets	18–16–7–3	W
45	January 16, 2003	1–3	@ Ottawa Senators	18–17–7–3	L
46	January 18, 2003	1–0	@ Minnesota Wild	19–17–7–3	W
47	January 20, 2003	1–2 OT	Minnesota Wild	19–17–7–4	OTL
48	January 22, 2003	6–5	Los Angeles Kings	20–17–7–4	W
49	January 24, 2003	1–3	New Jersey Devils	20–18–7–4	L
50	January 29, 2003	3–2	Ottawa Senators	21–18–7–4	W
51	January 30, 2003	4–3	@ San Jose Sharks	22–18–7–4	W

February: 8–5–1–0 (home: 4–1–1–0; road: 4–4–0–0)

Game	Date	Score	Opponent	Record	Recap
52	February 4, 2003	3–2	@ Calgary Flames	23–18–7–4	W
53	February 5, 2003	1–2	@ Edmonton Oilers	23–19–7–4	L
54	February 7, 2003	3–2	Phoenix Coyotes	24–19–7–4	W
55	February 9, 2003	2–1	Carolina Hurricanes	25–19–7–4	W
56	February 12, 2003	4–3 OT	Calgary Flames	26–19–7–4	W
57	February 14, 2003	4–2	@ Dallas Stars	27–19–7–4	W
58	February 15, 2003	1–2	@ Nashville Predators	27–20–7–4	L
59	February 17, 2003	2–2 OT	New York Islanders	27–20–8–4	T
60	February 19, 2003	2–0	Columbus Blue Jackets	28–20–8–4	W
61	February 21, 2003	2–6	New York Rangers	28–21–8–4	L
62	February 23, 2003	4–0	@ Carolina Hurricanes	29–21–8–4	W
63	February 25, 2003	0–2	@ Tampa Bay Lightning	29–22–8–4	L
64	February 26, 2003	2–1	@ Florida Panthers	30–22–8–4	W
65	February 28, 2003	1–3	@ Phoenix Coyotes	30–23–8–4	L

March: 9–3–1–1 (home: 6–2–1–0; road: 3–1–0–1)

Game	Date	Score	Opponent	Record	Recap
66	March 2, 2003	1–4	Atlanta Thrashers	30–24–8–4	L
67	March 4, 2003	2–1	@ Los Angeles Kings	31–24–8–4	W
68	March 5, 2003	3–1	Montreal Canadiens	32–24–8–4	W
69	March 7, 2003	1–4	Edmonton Oilers	32–25–8–4	L
70	March 9, 2003	4–1	Detroit Red Wings	33–25–8–4	W
71	March 12, 2003	5–2	Chicago Blackhawks	34–25–8–4	W
72	March 13, 2003	3–2 OT	San Jose Sharks	35–25–8–4	W
73	March 15, 2003	2–4	@ Phoenix Coyotes	35–26–8–4	L
74	March 16, 2003	2–2 OT	Calgary Flames	35–26–9–4	T
75	March 19, 2003	4–3	@ Chicago Blackhawks	36–26–9–4	W
76	March 20, 2003	2–3 OT	@ St. Louis Blues	36–26–9–5	OTL
77	March 22, 2003	3–2 OT	@ San Jose Sharks	37–26–9–5	W
78	March 24, 2003	5–0	Columbus Blue Jackets	38–26–9–5	W
79	March 30, 2003	3–1	Vancouver Canucks	39–26–9–5	W

April: 1–1–0–1 (home: 0–0–0–1; road: 1–1–0–0)

Game	Date	Score	Opponent	Record	Recap
80	April 1, 2003	2–1 OT	@ Nashville Predators	40–26–9–5	W
81	April 2, 2003	1–2	@ Dallas Stars	40–27–9–5	L
82	April 4, 2003	3–4 OT	Colorado Avalanche	40–27–9–6	OTL

Legend: W Win (2 points) L Loss (0 points) T Tie (1 point) OTL Overtime loss (1 point)

=== Playoffs ===
2003 Stanley Cup playoffs
Western Conference Quarterfinals vs. (2) Detroit Red Wings – Mighty Ducks win 4–0

Game	Date	Score	Opponent	Series	Recap
1	April 10, 2003	2–1 3OT	@ Detroit Red Wings	Mighty Ducks lead 1–0	W
2	April 12, 2003	3–2	@ Detroit Red Wings	Mighty Ducks lead 2–0	W
3	April 14, 2003	2–1	Detroit Red Wings	Mighty Ducks lead 3–0	W
4	April 16, 2003	3–2 OT	Detroit Red Wings	Mighty Ducks win 4–0	W

Western Conference Semifinals vs. (1) Dallas Stars – Mighty Ducks win 4–2

Game	Date	Score	Opponent	Series	Recap
1	April 24, 2003	4–3 5OT	@ Dallas Stars	Mighty Ducks lead 1–0	W
2	April 26, 2003	3–2 OT	@ Dallas Stars	Mighty Ducks lead 2–0	W
3	April 28, 2003	1–2	Dallas Stars	Mighty Ducks lead 2–1	L
4	April 30, 2003	1–0	Dallas Stars	Mighty Ducks lead 3–1	W
5	May 3, 2003	1–4	@ Dallas Stars	Mighty Ducks lead 3–2	L
6	May 5, 2003	4–3	Dallas Stars	Mighty Ducks win 4–2	W

Western Conference Finals vs. (6) Minnesota Wild – Mighty Ducks win 4–0

Game	Date	Score	Opponent	Series	Recap
1	May 10, 2003	1–0 2OT	@ Minnesota Wild	Mighty Ducks lead 1–0	W
2	May 12, 2003	2–0	@ Minnesota Wild	Mighty Ducks lead 2–0	W
3	May 14, 2003	4–0	Minnesota Wild	Mighty Ducks lead 3–0	W
4	May 16, 2003	2–1	Minnesota Wild	Mighty Ducks win 4–0	W

Stanley Cup Finals vs. (E2) New Jersey Devils – Devils win 4–3

Game	Date	Score	Opponent	Series	Recap
1	May 27, 2003	0–3	@ New Jersey Devils	Devils lead 1–0	L
2	May 29, 2003	0–3	@ New Jersey Devils	Devils lead 2–0	L
3	May 31, 2003	3–2 OT	New Jersey Devils	Devils lead 2–1	W
4	June 2, 2003	1–0 OT	New Jersey Devils	Series tied 2–2	W
5	June 5, 2003	3–6	@ New Jersey Devils	Devils lead 3–2	L
6	June 7, 2003	5–2	New Jersey Devils	Series tied 3–3	W
7	June 9, 2003	0–3	@ New Jersey Devils	Devils win 4–3	L

Legend: W Win L Loss

== Player statistics ==
=== Scoring ===
- Position abbreviations: C = Center; D = Defense; G = Goaltender; LW = Left wing; RW = Right wing
- † = Joined team via a transaction (e.g., trade, waivers, signing) during the season. Stats reflect time with the Mighty Ducks only.
- ‡ = Left team via a transaction (e.g., trade, waivers, release) during the season. Stats reflect time with the Mighty Ducks only.

No.	Player	Pos	Regular season						Playoffs					
No.	Player	Pos	GP	G	A	Pts	+/-	PIM	GP	G	A	Pts	+/-	PIM
9	Paul Kariya	LW	82	25	56	81	−3	48	21	6	6	12	0	6
39	Petr Sykora	RW	82	34	25	59	−7	24	21	4	9	13	3	12
20	Steve Rucchin	C	82	20	38	58	−14	12	21	7	3	10	−2	2
77	Adam Oates	C	67	9	36	45	−1	16	21	4	9	13	2	6
28	Niclas Havelid	D	82	11	22	33	5	30	21	0	4	4	0	2
23	Stanislav Chistov	LW	79	12	18	30	4	54	21	4	2	6	4	8
12	Mike Leclerc	LW	57	9	19	28	−8	34	21	2	9	11	3	12
10	Jason Krog	C	67	10	15	25	1	12	21	3	1	4	3	4
3	Keith Carney	D	81	4	18	22	8	65	21	0	4	4	3	16
19	Andy McDonald	C	46	10	11	21	−1	14	—	—	—	—	—	—
17	Matt Cullen‡	C	50	7	14	21	−4	12	—	—	—	—	—	—
18	Patric Kjellberg	LW	76	8	11	19	−9	16	10	0	0	0	−2	0
8	Sandis Ozolinsh†	D	31	5	13	18	10	16	21	2	6	8	8	10
26	Samuel Pahlsson	C	34	4	11	15	10	18	21	2	4	6	1	12
32	Steve Thomas†	RW	12	10	3	13	10	2	21	4	4	8	2	8
24	Ruslan Salei	D	61	4	8	12	2	78	21	2	3	5	3	26
7	Pavel Trnka‡	D	24	3	6	9	2	6	—	—	—	—	—	—
2	Fredrik Olausson	D	44	2	6	8	0	22	1	0	0	0	0	0
5	Vitaly Vishnevski	D	80	2	6	8	−8	76	21	0	1	1	−3	6
11 (Note: Chouinard wore number 32 until Thomas was acquired.)	Marc Chouinard	C	70	3	4	7	−9	40	15	1	0	1	1	0
22	Alexei Smirnov	LW	44	3	2	5	−1	18	4	0	0	0	0	2
21	Dan Bylsma	RW	39	1	4	5	−1	12	11	0	1	1	3	2
44	Rob Niedermayer†	LW	12	2	2	4	3	15	21	3	7	10	−5	18
25	Kevin Sawyer	LW	31	2	1	3	−2	115	—	—	—	—	—	—
34	Kurt Sauer	D	80	1	2	3	−23	74	21	1	1	2	3	6
44	Mike Brown†	LW	16	1	1	2	0	44	—	—	—	—	—	—
38	Rob Valicevic	RW	10	1	0	1	1	2	—	—	—	—	—	—
29	Martin Gerber	G	22	0	1	1		0	2	0	0	0		0
37	Chris O'Sullivan	D	2	0	1	1	0	0	—	—	—	—	—	—
4	Lance Ward†	D	29	0	1	1	−2	43	—	—	—	—	—	—
35	Jean-Sebastien Giguere	G	65	0	0	0		8	21	0	1	1		0
51	Jonathan Hedstrom	RW	4	0	0	0	−1	0	—	—	—	—	—	—
14	Cam Severson	LW	2	0	0	0	0	8	1	0	0	0	0	0

=== Goaltending ===
No.	Player	Regular season										Playoffs								
No.	Player	GP	W	L	T	SA	GA	GAA	SV%	SO	TOI	GP	W	L	SA	GA	GAA	SV%	SO	TOI
35	Jean-Sebastien Giguere	65	34	22	6	1820	145	2.30	.920	8	3775	21	15	6	697	38	1.62	.945	5	1407
29	Martin Gerber	22	6	11	3	548	39	1.95	.929	1	1203	2	0	0	6	1	3.00	.833	0	20

== Awards and records ==
=== Awards ===
Type	Award/honor	Recipient	Ref
League (annual)	Conn Smythe Trophy	Jean Sebastien Giguere	
League (annual)	NHL Second All-Star Team	Paul Kariya (Left wing)	
League (in-season)	NHL All-Star Game selection	Paul Kariya	
League (in-season)	NHL Player of the Week	Jean-Sebastien Giguere (December 16)	
League (in-season)	NHL Player of the Week	Paul Kariya (December 23)	
League (in-season)	NHL YoungStars Game selection	Stanislav Chistov	

=== Milestones ===
Milestone	Player	Date	Ref
First game	Stanislav Chistov	October 10, 2002	
First game	Kurt Sauer	October 10, 2002	
First game	Alexei Smirnov	October 10, 2002	
First game	Martin Gerber	October 11, 2002	
First game	Jonathan Hedstrom	December 3, 2002	
First game	Cam Severson	March 30, 2003	
1,000th game played	Fredrik Olausson	December 11, 2002	

== Transactions ==
The Mighty Ducks were involved in the following transactions from June 14, 2002, the day after the deciding game of the 2002 Stanley Cup Final, through June 9, 2003, the day of the deciding game of the 2003 Stanley Cup Final.

=== Trades ===
Date	Details		Ref
June 22, 2002	To Mighty Ducks of Anaheim: Future considerations (Note: Nashville promised not to select Joffrey Lupul with the sixth overall pick in the 2002 draft.)	To Nashville Predators: Boston's 3rd-round pick in 2002	
June 25, 2002	To Mighty Ducks of Anaheim: 3rd-round pick in 2003	To Boston Bruins: Steve Shields	
July 6, 2002	To Mighty Ducks of Anaheim: Mike Commodore; Jean-Francois Damphousse; Petr Sykora; Rights to Igor Pohanka	To New Jersey Devils: Maxim Balmochnykh; Jeff Friesen; Oleg Tverdovsky	
October 23, 2002	To Mighty Ducks of Anaheim: Future considerations	To Nashville Predators: Jason York	
January 30, 2003	To Mighty Ducks of Anaheim: Sandis Ozolinsh; Lance Ward	To Florida Panthers: Matt Cullen; Pavel Trnka; 4th-round pick in 2003	
March 11, 2003	To Mighty Ducks of Anaheim: Steve Thomas	To Chicago Blackhawks: 5th-round pick in 2003	
March 11, 2003	To Mighty Ducks of Anaheim: Rob Niedermayer	To Calgary Flames: Mike Commodore; Jean-Francois Damphousse	

=== Players acquired ===
Date	Player	Former team	Term	Via	Ref
July 1, 2002	Adam Oates	Philadelphia Flyers	1-year (Note: Club option for a second year.)	Free agency	
July 8, 2002	Cory Pecker	Erie Otters (OHL)	3-year	Free agency	
July 12, 2002	Fredrik Olausson	Detroit Red Wings	1-year	Free agency	
July 18, 2002	Jason Krog	New York Islanders	2-year	Free agency	
July 18, 2002	Todd Reirden	Atlanta Thrashers	2-year	Free agency	
July 24, 2002	Rob Valicevic	Los Angeles Kings	1-year	Free agency	
August 22, 2002	Francis Belanger	Montreal Canadiens	1-year	Free agency	
August 22, 2002	Josh DeWolf	Detroit Red Wings	1-year	Free agency	
August 22, 2002	Cam Severson	Hartford Wolf Pack (AHL)	1-year	Free agency	
August 22, 2002	Nick Smith	Florida Panthers	1-year	Free agency	
October 11, 2002	Mike Brown	Vancouver Canucks		Waivers	
April 1, 2003	Chris Kunitz	Ferris State University (CCHA)	2-year	Free agency	

=== Players lost ===
Date	Player	New team	Via (Note: In parentheses is the player's free agency group on July 1 if applicable.)	Ref
July 14, 2002	Sergei Krivokrasov	Amur Khabarovsk (RSL)	Free agency (UFA)	
August 9, 2002	Aris Brimanis	St. Louis Blues	Free agency (UFA)	
August 13, 2002	Antti-Jussi Niemi	Jokerit (Liiga)	Free agency (II) (Note: Anaheim retained Niemi's NHL rights through the 2006–07 season.)	
September 23, 2002	Brian White	Providence Bruins (AHL)	Free agency (VI)	
N/A	Mark Moore	Augusta Lynx (ECHL)	Free agency (UFA)	
October 11, 2002	Drew Bannister	Karpat (Liiga)	Free agency (UFA)	
October 17, 2002	Denny Lambert	Milwaukee Admirals (AHL) (Note: Lambert signed with Milwaukee on January 11, 2003.)	Buyout	
October 17, 2002	German Titov		Buyout	
January 24, 2003	Gregg Naumenko	Cincinnati Cyclones (ECHL)	Free agency (VI)	
June 6, 2003	Patric Kjellberg		Retirement	

=== Signings ===
Date	Player	Term	Contract type	Ref
June 19, 2002	Alexei Smirnov	3-year	Entry-level	
June 26, 2002	Marc Chouinard	1-year	Option exercised	
June 26, 2002	Kevin Sawyer	1-year	Option exercised	
July 2, 2002	Vitali Vishnevski	1-year	Re-signing	
July 14, 2002	Martin Gerber	1-year	Entry-level	
July 14, 2002	Tony Martensson	2-year	Entry-level	
July 14, 2002	Jan Tabacek	2-year	Entry-level	
July 15, 2002	Stanislav Chistov	3-year	Entry-level	
July 19, 2002	Pavel Trnka	2-year	Re-signing	
July 22, 2002	Chris O'Sullivan	1-year	Re-signing	
July 22, 2002	Samuel Pahlsson	1-year	Re-signing	
July 24, 2002	Jean-Francois Damphousse	1-year	Re-signing	
July 31, 2002	Paul Kariya	1-year	Re-signing	
August 1, 2002	Andy McDonald	2-year	Re-signing	
August 3, 2002	Matt Cullen	2-year	Re-signing	
August 6, 2002	Ruslan Salei	2-year	Re-signing	
August 22, 2002	Brian Gornick	2-year	Entry-level	
August 26, 2002	Steve Rucchin	4-year	Re-signing	
November 13, 2002	Joffrey Lupul	3-year	Entry-level	
December 26, 2002	Joel Perrault	3-year	Entry-level	
April 29, 2003	Michael Holmqvist	1-year	Entry-level	
May 6, 2003	George Davis	3-year	Entry-level	
May 22, 2003	P. A. Parenteau	3-year	Entry-level	
June 1, 2003	Igor Pohanka	3-year	Entry-level	
June 1, 2003	Joel Stepp	3-year	Entry-level	

== Draft picks ==
Anaheim's picks at the 2002 NHL entry draft in Toronto, Ontario.

Round	#	Player	Position	Nationality	College/Junior/Club team (League)
1	7	Joffrey Lupul	Forward	Canada	Medicine Hat Tigers (WHL)
2	37	Tim Brent	Forward	Canada	Toronto St. Michael's Majors (OHL)
3	71	Brian Lee	Defense	United States	Erie Otters (OHL)
4	103	Joonas Vihko	Forward	Finland	HIFK (Finland)
5	140	George Davis	Forward	Canada	Cape Breton Screaming Eagles (QMJHL)
6	173	Luke Fritshaw	Defense	Canada	Prince Albert Raiders (WHL)
9	261	Francois Caron	Defense	Canada	Moncton Wildcats (QMJHL)
9	267	Chris Petrow	Defense	Canada	Oshawa Generals (OHL)

== Farm teams ==
- The Mighty Ducks farm team was the Cincinnati Mighty Ducks of the American Hockey League. The team finished third in the Central Division with a record of 26-35-13-6.

== See also ==
- 2002–03 NHL season
