= 2002–03 Florida Panthers season =

National Hockey League team season

2002–03 Florida Panthers
- Division: 4th Southeast
- Conference: 13th Eastern
- 2002–03 record: 24–36–13–9
- Home record: 8–21–7–5
- Road record: 16–15–6–4
- Goals for: 176
- Goals against: 237

Team information
- General manager: Rick Dudley
- Coach: Mike Keenan
- Captain: Vacant
- Alternate captains: Olli Jokinen; Viktor Kozlov; Marcus Nilson; Sandis Ozolinsh (Oct.–Jan.); Dmitri Yushkevich (Oct.–Nov.)
- Arena: Office Depot Center
- Average attendance: 15,428
- Minor league affiliate: San Antonio Rampage

Team leaders
- Goals: Olli Jokinen (36)
- Assists: Olli Jokinen (29)
- Points: Olli Jokinen (65)
- Penalty minutes: Peter Worrell (193)
- Plus/minus: Andreas Lilja (+8)
- Wins: Roberto Luongo (20)
- Goals against average: Roberto Luongo (2.71)

The 2002–03 Florida Panthers season was their tenth season in the National Hockey League (NHL). The Panthers failed to qualify for the playoffs for the third consecutive season for the first time in franchise history, but did host the 53rd All-Star Game.

== Offseason ==
Rick Dudley was named the team’s new general manager.

== Regular season ==
=== All-Star Game ===
The 53rd National Hockey League All-Star Game was held during the 2002–03 NHL season, and took place at the Office Depot Center in Sunrise, Florida, the home of the Florida Panthers, on February 2, 2003. It was the first All-Star Game since the 1997 All-Star Game to use the Eastern Conference – Western Conference format.

=== Final standings ===
Southeast Division
No.	CR		GP	W	L	T	OTL	GF	GA	Pts
1	3	**Tampa Bay Lightning**	82	36	25	16	5	219	210	93
2	6	**Washington Capitals**	82	39	29	8	6	224	220	92
3	11	Atlanta Thrashers	82	31	39	7	5	226	284	74
4	13	Florida Panthers	82	24	36	13	9	176	237	70
5	15	Carolina Hurricanes	82	22	43	11	6	171	240	61

Note: CR = Conference rank; GP = Games played; W = Wins; L = Losses; T = Ties; OTL = Overtime loss; GF = Goals for; GA = Goals against; Pts = Points
Bolded teams qualified for the playoffs.

Eastern Conference
R		Div	GP	W	L	T	OTL	GF	GA	Pts
**1**	**P-** Ottawa Senators	**NE**	**82**	**52**	**21**	**8**	**1**	**263**	**182**	113
**2**	**Y-** New Jersey Devils	**AT**	**82**	**46**	**20**	**10**	**6**	**216**	**166**	108
**3**	**Y-** Tampa Bay Lightning	**SE**	**82**	**36**	**25**	**16**	**5**	**219**	**210**	93
**4**	**X-** Philadelphia Flyers	**AT**	**82**	**45**	**20**	**13**	**4**	**211**	**166**	107
**5**	**X-** Toronto Maple Leafs	**NE**	**82**	**44**	**28**	**7**	**3**	**236**	**208**	98
**6**	**X-** Washington Capitals	**SE**	**82**	**39**	**29**	**8**	**6**	**224**	**220**	92
**7**	**X-** Boston Bruins	**NE**	**82**	**36**	**31**	**11**	**4**	**245**	**237**	87
**8**	**X-** New York Islanders	**AT**	**82**	**35**	**34**	**11**	**2**	**224**	**231**	83
8.5
9	New York Rangers	AT	82	32	36	10	4	210	231	78
10	Montreal Canadiens	NE	82	30	35	8	9	206	234	77
11	Atlanta Thrashers	SE	82	31	39	7	5	226	284	74
12	Buffalo Sabres	NE	82	27	37	10	8	190	219	72
13	Florida Panthers	SE	82	24	36	13	9	176	237	70
14	Pittsburgh Penguins	AT	82	27	44	6	5	189	255	65
15	Carolina Hurricanes	SE	82	22	43	11	6	171	240	61

Divisions: AT – Atlantic, NE – Northeast, SE – Southeast

P – Clinched Presidents Trophy; Y – Clinched division; X – Clinched playoff spot

== Schedule and results ==
2002–03 regular season
October: 4–5–1–1 (home: 1–1–1–1; road: 3–4–0–0)

Game	Date	Score	Opponent	Record	Recap
1	October 10, 2002	3–4 OT	Tampa Bay Lightning (2002–03)	0–0–0–1	OTL
2	October 12, 2002	5–4 OT	@ Atlanta Thrashers (2002–03)	1–0–0–1	W
3	October 15, 2002	1–4	@ Minnesota Wild (2002–03)	1–1–0–1	L
4	October 17, 2002	1–4	@ Chicago Blackhawks (2002–03)	1–2–0–1	L
5	October 19, 2002	1–4	@ Columbus Blue Jackets (2002–03)	1–3–0–1	L
6	October 21, 2002	3–2	Atlanta Thrashers (2002–03)	2–3–0–1	W
7	October 23, 2002	4–1	@ Toronto Maple Leafs (2002–03)	3–3–0–1	W
8	October 24, 2002	3–5	@ New York Islanders (2002–03)	3–4–0–1	L
9	October 26, 2002	1–1 OT	Washington Capitals (2002–03)	3–4–1–1	T
10	October 28, 2002	1–6	Tampa Bay Lightning (2002–03)	3–5–1–1	L
11	October 30, 2002	3–2 OT	@ Dallas Stars (2002–03)	4–5–1–1	W

November: 3–3–5–3 (home: 2–3–2–0; road: 1–0–3–3)

Game	Date	Score	Opponent	Record	Recap
12	November 2, 2002	1–3	Atlanta Thrashers (2002–03)	4–6–1–1	L
13	November 6, 2002	4–3 OT	Pittsburgh Penguins (2002–03)	5–6–1–1	W
14	November 7, 2002	1–2 OT	@ Washington Capitals (2002–03)	5–6–1–2	OTL
15	November 9, 2002	3–0	Calgary Flames (2002–03)	6–6–1–2	W
16	November 11, 2002	2–2 OT	Chicago Blackhawks (2002–03)	6–6–2–2	T
17	November 13, 2002	1–1 OT	@ Philadelphia Flyers (2002–03)	6–6–3–2	T
18	November 14, 2002	2–3 OT	@ Ottawa Senators (2002–03)	6–6–3–3	OTL
19	November 16, 2002	3–7	San Jose Sharks (2002–03)	6–7–3–3	L
20	November 19, 2002	3–4 OT	@ Atlanta Thrashers (2002–03)	6–7–3–4	OTL
21	November 20, 2002	3–3 OT	New York Islanders (2002–03)	6–7–4–4	T
22	November 22, 2002	3–3 OT	@ Phoenix Coyotes (2002–03)	6–7–5–4	T
23	November 24, 2002	4–4 OT	@ Mighty Ducks of Anaheim (2002–03)	6–7–6–4	T
24	November 27, 2002	5–2	@ Los Angeles Kings (2002–03)	7–7–6–4	W
25	November 30, 2002	2–5	Vancouver Canucks (2002–03)	7–8–6–4	L

December: 3–3–3–3 (home: 1–3–2–2; road: 2–0–1–1)

Game	Date	Score	Opponent	Record	Recap
26	December 4, 2002	4–2	Carolina Hurricanes (2002–03)	8–8–6–4	W
27	December 6, 2002	2–0	@ Carolina Hurricanes (2002–03)	9–8–6–4	W
28	December 7, 2002	0–4	Edmonton Oilers (2002–03)	9–9–6–4	L
29	December 10, 2002	2–5	Philadelphia Flyers (2002–03)	9–10–6–4	L
30	December 13, 2002	3–3 OT	New York Islanders (2002–03)	9–10–7–4	T
31	December 18, 2002	2–2 OT	Toronto Maple Leafs (2002–03)	9–10–8–4	T
32	December 20, 2002	3–0	@ Buffalo Sabres (2002–03)	10–10–8–4	W
33	December 21, 2002	3–3 OT	@ Boston Bruins (2002–03)	10–10–9–4	T
34	December 23, 2002	2–3 OT	Nashville Predators (2002–03)	10–10–9–5	OTL
35	December 27, 2002	0–4	Dallas Stars (2002–03)	10–11–9–5	L
36	December 28, 2002	1–2 OT	New York Rangers (2002–03)	10–11–9–6	OTL
37	December 30, 2002	1–2 OT	@ New York Islanders (2002–03)	10–11–9–7	OTL

January: 5–8–1–1 (home: 3–3–0–1; road: 2–5–1–0)

Game	Date	Score	Opponent	Record	Recap
38	January 1, 2003	2–1	@ New Jersey Devils (2002–03)	11–11–9–7	W
39	January 2, 2003	4–1	@ Colorado Avalanche (2002–03)	12–11–9–7	W
40	January 4, 2003	2–3	@ Vancouver Canucks (2002–03)	12–12–9–7	L
41	January 8, 2003	1–2 OT	Detroit Red Wings (2002–03)	12–12–9–8	OTL
42	January 10, 2003	1–2	New Jersey Devils (2002–03)	12–13–9–8	L
43	January 11, 2003	2–12	@ Washington Capitals (2002–03)	12–14–9–8	L
44	January 13, 2003	2–6	@ New Jersey Devils (2002–03)	12–15–9–8	L
45	January 15, 2003	3–0	Boston Bruins (2002–03)	13–15–9–8	W
46	January 18, 2003	3–0	Pittsburgh Penguins (2002–03)	14–15–9–8	W
47	January 20, 2003	2–3	Montreal Canadiens (2002–03)	14–16–9–8	L
48	January 22, 2003	1–2	Ottawa Senators (2002–03)	14–17–9–8	L
49	January 24, 2003	1–3	@ Carolina Hurricanes (2002–03)	14–18–9–8	L
50	January 25, 2003	3–2 OT	Carolina Hurricanes (2002–03)	15–18–9–8	W
51	January 28, 2003	3–6	@ Montreal Canadiens (2002–03)	15–19–9–8	L
52	January 30, 2003	2–2 OT	@ Detroit Red Wings (2002–03)	15–19–10–8	T

February: 4–5–2–1 (home: 0–4–2–1; road: 4–1–0–0)

Game	Date	Score	Opponent	Record	Recap
53	February 5, 2003	0–6	Toronto Maple Leafs (2002–03)	15–20–10–8	L
54	February 6, 2003	6–0	@ Pittsburgh Penguins (2002–03)	16–20–10–8	W
55	February 8, 2003	4–4 OT	Tampa Bay Lightning (2002–03)	16–20–11–8	T
56	February 12, 2003	1–3	New York Rangers (2002–03)	16–21–11–8	L
57	February 14, 2003	5–6 OT	Boston Bruins (2002–03)	16–21–11–9	OTL
58	February 15, 2003	1–2	Washington Capitals (2002–03)	16–22–11–9	L
59	February 18, 2003	3–0	@ Montreal Canadiens (2002–03)	17–22–11–9	W
60	February 20, 2003	4–3	@ Ottawa Senators (2002–03)	18–22–11–9	W
61	February 22, 2003	4–2	@ Philadelphia Flyers (2002–03)	19–22–11–9	W
62	February 24, 2003	2–2 OT	Buffalo Sabres (2002–03)	19–22–12–9	T
63	February 26, 2003	1–2	Mighty Ducks of Anaheim (2002–03)	19–23–12–9	L
64	February 27, 2003	1–3	@ Tampa Bay Lightning (2002–03)	19–24–12–9	L

March: 4–10–1–0 (home: 0–6–0–0; road: 4–4–1–0)

Game	Date	Score	Opponent	Record	Recap
65	March 1, 2003	2–5	@ New York Rangers (2002–03)	19–25–12–9	L
66	March 3, 2003	2–1	@ Toronto Maple Leafs (2002–03)	20–25–12–9	W
67	March 5, 2003	1–3	Colorado Avalanche (2002–03)	20–26–12–9	L
68	March 7, 2003	2–1	@ Atlanta Thrashers (2002–03)	21–26–12–9	W
69	March 8, 2003	0–4	Buffalo Sabres (2002–03)	21–27–12–9	L
70	March 10, 2003	2–1	@ New York Rangers (2002–03)	22–27–12–9	W
71	March 12, 2003	0–4	Montreal Canadiens (2002–03)	22–28–12–9	L
72	March 15, 2003	1–4	@ Boston Bruins (2002–03)	22–29–12–9	L
73	March 16, 2003	4–2	@ Pittsburgh Penguins (2002–03)	23–29–12–9	W
74	March 19, 2003	1–3	Minnesota Wild (2002–03)	23–30–12–9	L
75	March 22, 2003	1–3	Ottawa Senators (2002–03)	23–31–12–9	L
76	March 24, 2003	1–4	New Jersey Devils (2002–03)	23–32–12–9	L
77	March 26, 2003	1–2	@ Buffalo Sabres (2002–03)	23–33–12–9	L
78	March 27, 2003	1–2	@ St. Louis Blues (2002–03)	23–34–12–9	L
79	March 29, 2003	1–1 OT	@ Tampa Bay Lightning (2002–03)	23–34–13–9	T

April: 1–2–0–0 (home: 1–1–0–0; road: 0–1–0–0)

Game	Date	Score	Opponent	Record	Recap
80	April 1, 2003	0–3	@ Washington Capitals (2002–03)	23–35–13–9	L
81	April 4, 2003	4–1	Carolina Hurricanes (2002–03)	24–35–13–9	W
82	April 6, 2003	2–6	Philadelphia Flyers (2002–03)	24–36–13–9	L

Legend: W Win (2 points) L Loss (0 points) T Tie (1 point) OTL Overtime loss (1 point)

== Player statistics ==
=== Scoring ===
- Position abbreviations: C = Center; D = Defense; G = Goaltender; LW = Left wing; RW = Right wing
- † = Joined team via a transaction (e.g., trade, waivers, signing) during the season. Stats reflect time with the Panthers only.
- ‡ = Left team via a transaction (e.g., trade, waivers, release) during the season. Stats reflect time with the Panthers only.

No.	Player	Pos	Regular season					
No.	Player	Pos	GP	G	A	Pts	+/-	PIM
12	Olli Jokinen	C	81	36	29	65	−17	79
25	Viktor Kozlov	C	74	22	34	56	−8	18
22	Kristian Huselius	LW	78	20	23	43	−6	20
18	Marcus Nilson	LW	82	15	19	34	2	31
39	Ivan Novoseltsev	RW	78	10	17	27	−16	30
44	Sandis Ozolinsh‡	D	51	7	19	26	−16	40
20	Valeri Bure‡	RW	46	5	21	26	−11	10
14	Niklas Hagman	LW	80	8	15	23	−8	20
9	Stephen Weiss	C	77	6	15	21	−13	17
27	Jaroslav Bednar†	RW	52	5	13	18	−2	14
4	Jay Bouwmeester	D	82	4	12	16	−29	14
16	Matt Cullen†	C	30	6	6	12	−4	22
6	Andreas Lilja†	D	56	4	8	12	8	56
56	Ivan Majesky	D	82	4	8	12	−18	92
34	Mathieu Biron	D	34	1	8	9	−18	14
32	Stephane Matteau	LW	52	4	4	8	−9	27
45	Brad Ference‡	D	60	2	6	8	2	118
17	Ryan Johnson‡	C	58	2	5	7	−13	26
36	Dmitri Yushkevich‡	D	23	1	6	7	−12	14
21	Denis Shvidki	RW	23	4	2	6	−7	12
8	Peter Worrell	LW	63	2	3	5	−14	193
49	Lance Ward‡	D	36	3	1	4	−4	78
29 (Note: Toms wore number 28 in his first two games.)	Jeff Toms	C	8	2	2	4	2	4
19	Byron Ritchie	C	30	0	3	3	−4	19
7	Pavel Trnka†	D	22	0	3	3	−1	24
5	Branislav Mezei	D	11	2	0	2	−2	10
55	Igor Ulanov	D	56	1	1	2	7	39
38	Eric Beaudoin	LW	15	0	1	1	−7	25
23	Juraj Kolnik†	RW	10	0	1	1	1	0
29	Igor Kravchuk†	D	7	0	1	1	−3	4
15	Jim Campbell	RW	1	0	0	0	0	0
26	Pierre Dagenais	RW	9	0	0	0	−1	4
24	Darcy Hordichuk†	LW	3	0	0	0	−1	15
30	Jani Hurme	G	28	0	0	0		2
1	Roberto Luongo	G	65	0	0	0		4
28	Jamie Rivers†	D	1	0	0	0	−2	2
33	Kyle Rossiter	D	3	0	0	0	−2	0
36	Joey Tetarenko‡	RW	2	0	0	0	−1	4

=== Goaltending ===
No.	Player	Regular season									
No.	Player	GP	W	L	T	SA	GA	GAA	SV%	SO	TOI
1	Roberto Luongo	65	20	34	7	2011	164	2.71	.918	6	3627
30	Jani Hurme	28	4	11	6	707	66	2.88	.907	1	1376

== Awards and records ==
=== Awards ===
Type	Award/honor	Recipient	Ref
League (annual)	NHL All-Rookie Team	Jay Bouwmeester (Defense)	
League (in-season)	NHL All-Star Game selection	Olli Jokinen (Note: Jokinen was an injury replacement for Saku Koivu of the Montreal Canadiens.)	
League (in-season)	NHL All-Star Game selection	Sandis Ozolinsh (Note: Ozolinsh was voted to the starting lineup.)	
League (in-season)	NHL YoungStars Game selection	Jay Bouwmeester	
League (in-season)	NHL YoungStars Game selection	Niklas Hagman	
League (in-season)	NHL YoungStars Game selection	Stephen Weiss	

=== Milestones ===
Milestone	Player	Date	Ref
First game	Jay Bouwmeester	October 10, 2002	
First game	Ivan Majesky	October 10, 2002	

== Transactions ==
The Panthers were involved in the following transactions from June 14, 2002, the day after the deciding game of the 2002 Stanley Cup Finals, through June 9, 2003, the day of the deciding game of the 2003 Stanley Cup Finals.

=== Trades ===
Date	Details		Ref
June 22, 2002	To Florida Panthers: 1st-round pick in 2002; Option to switch 1st-round picks in 2003	To Columbus Blue Jackets: 1st-round pick in 2002	
June 22, 2002	To Florida Panthers: Future considerations (Note: Atlanta promised not to pick defenseman Jay Bouwmeester with the second overall selection in the draft.)	To Atlanta Thrashers: Vancouver’s 3rd-round pick in 2002; NY Rangers’ 4th-round pick in 2003	
June 22, 2002	To Florida Panthers: 1st-round pick in 2002	To Calgary Flames: 1st-round pick in 2002; 4th-round pick in 2002	
June 22, 2002	To Florida Panthers: Florida’s 3rd-round pick in 2002	To New York Islanders: Eric Godard	
June 23, 2002	To Florida Panthers: 9th-round pick in 2003	To Columbus Blue Jackets: 9th-round pick in 2002	
July 3, 2002	To Florida Panthers: Branislav Mezei	To New York Islanders: Jason Wiemer	
July 16, 2002	To Florida Panthers: Hannes Hyvonen	To San Jose Sharks: Future considerations (Note: 7th-round pick in 2003)	
July 18, 2002	To Florida Panthers: Rights to Dmitri Yushkevich	To Toronto Maple Leafs: Rights to Robert Svehla	
October 1, 2002	To Florida Panthers: Jani Hurme	To Ottawa Senators: Rights to Billy Thompson; Rights to Greg Watson	
October 4, 2002	To Florida Panthers: Mathieu Biron	To Columbus Blue Jackets: Rights to Petr Tenkrat	
October 11, 2002	To Florida Panthers: Juraj Kolnik; 9th-round pick in 2003	To New York Islanders: Sven Butenschon	
November 26, 2002	To Florida Panthers: Jaroslav Bednar; Andreas Lilja	To Los Angeles Kings: Dmitri Yushkevich; 5th-round pick in 2003	
January 30, 2003	To Florida Panthers: Matt Cullen; Pavel Trnka; 4th-round pick in 2003	To Anaheim Mighty Ducks: Sandis Ozolinsh; Lance Ward	
March 4, 2003	To Florida Panthers: Simon Lajeunesse	To Ottawa Senators: Joey Tetarenko	
March 8, 2003	To Florida Panthers: Darcy Hordichuk; 2nd-round pick in 2003	To Phoenix Coyotes: Brad Ference	
March 9, 2003	To Florida Panthers: Pascal Trepanier	To Nashville Predators: Wade Flaherty	
March 11, 2003	To Florida Panthers: Mike Van Ryn	To St. Louis Blues: Valeri Bure; Conditional 5th-round pick in 2004	

=== Players acquired ===
Date	Player	Former team	Term	Via	Ref
July 9, 2002	Sven Butenschon	Edmonton Oilers		Free agency	
July 10, 2002	Jeff Toms	Pittsburgh Penguins	2-year	Free agency	
July 16, 2002	Andy Lundbohm	San Jose Sharks		Free agency	
July 19, 2002	Jim Campbell	Chicago Blackhawks		Free agency	
July 31, 2002	Tyrone Garner	Greenville Grrrowl (ECHL)	1-year	Free agency	
August 2, 2002	Stephane Matteau	San Jose Sharks	1-year (Note: Option for a second year.)	Free agency	
August 14, 2002	Scott Kelman	Tri-City Americans (WHL)		Free agency	
August 22, 2002	Chris Mason	Nashville Predators		Free agency	
October 4, 2002	Petr Tenkrat	Nashville Predators		Waiver draft	
December 16, 2002	Jamie Rivers	San Antonio Rampage (AHL)	1-year (Note: Club option for a second year.)	Free agency	
March 11, 2003	Igor Kravchuk	Calgary Flames	1-year	Free agency	

=== Players lost ===
Date	Player	New team	Via (Note: In parentheses is the player's free agency group on July 1 if applicable.)	Ref
N/A	David MacIsaac	Amur Khabarovsk (RSL)	Free agency (VI)	
July 18, 2002	Matt Herr	Boston Bruins	Free agency (VI)	
August 22, 2002	Nick Smith	Anaheim Mighty Ducks	Free agency (UFA)	
August 26, 2002	Trevor Kidd	Toronto Maple Leafs (Note: Kidd signed with Toronto later the same day.)	Buyout	
August 27, 2002	Lance Pitlick	Colorado Avalanche	Free agency (III)	
September 25, 2002	Andrew Allen	Grand Rapids Griffins (AHL)	Free agency (UFA)	
October 5, 2002	Hannes Hyvonen	Columbus Blue Jackets	Waivers	
October 8, 2002	Brad Norton	Los Angeles Kings	Free agency (VI)	
October 12, 2002	Paul Harvey	Arkansas RiverBlades (ECHL)	Free agency (UFA)	
February 19, 2003	Ryan Johnson	St. Louis Blues	Waivers	

=== Signings ===
Date	Player	Term	Contract type	Ref
July 19, 2002	Olli Jokinen		Re-signing	
July 19, 2002	Ivan Majesky		Re-signing	
July 24, 2002	Dmitri Yushkevich	1-year	Re-signing	
July 30, 2002	Viktor Kozlov	1-year	Re-signing	
July 31, 2002	Serge Payer	1-year	Re-signing	
August 15, 2002	Brad Ference	multi-year	Re-signing	
August 15, 2002	Joey Tetarenko	1-year	Re-signing	
August 16, 2002	Ivan Novoseltsev	1-year	Re-signing	
October 7, 2002	Jay Bouwmeester	3-year	Entry-level	
February 5, 2003	Jani Hurme	3-year	Extension	
March 16, 2003	Grant McNeill		Entry-level	
March 27, 2003	Gregory Campbell		Entry-level	

== Draft picks ==
Florida's draft picks at the 2002 NHL entry draft held at the Air Canada Centre in Toronto, Ontario.

Round	#	Player	Nationality	College/Junior/Club team (League)
1	3	Jay Bouwmeester	Canada	Medicine Hat Tigers (WHL)
1	9	Petr Taticek	Czech Republic	Sault Ste. Marie Greyhounds (OHL)
2	40	Rob Globke	United States	University of Notre Dame (Hockey East)
3	67	Gregory Campbell	Canada	Plymouth Whalers (OHL)
5	134	Topi Jaakola	Finland	Karpat (Finland)
5	158	Vince Bellissimo	Canada	Topeka ScareCrows (USHL)
6	169	Jeremy Swanson	Canada	Barrie Colts (OHL)
6	196	Mikael Vuorio	Finland	Lukko (Finland)
7	200	Denis Yachmenev	Russia	North Bay Centennials (OHL)
8	232	Peter Hafner	United States	Taft High School (USHS-CT)
