= Alexei Smirnov (ice hockey) =

Russian ice hockey player (born 1982)

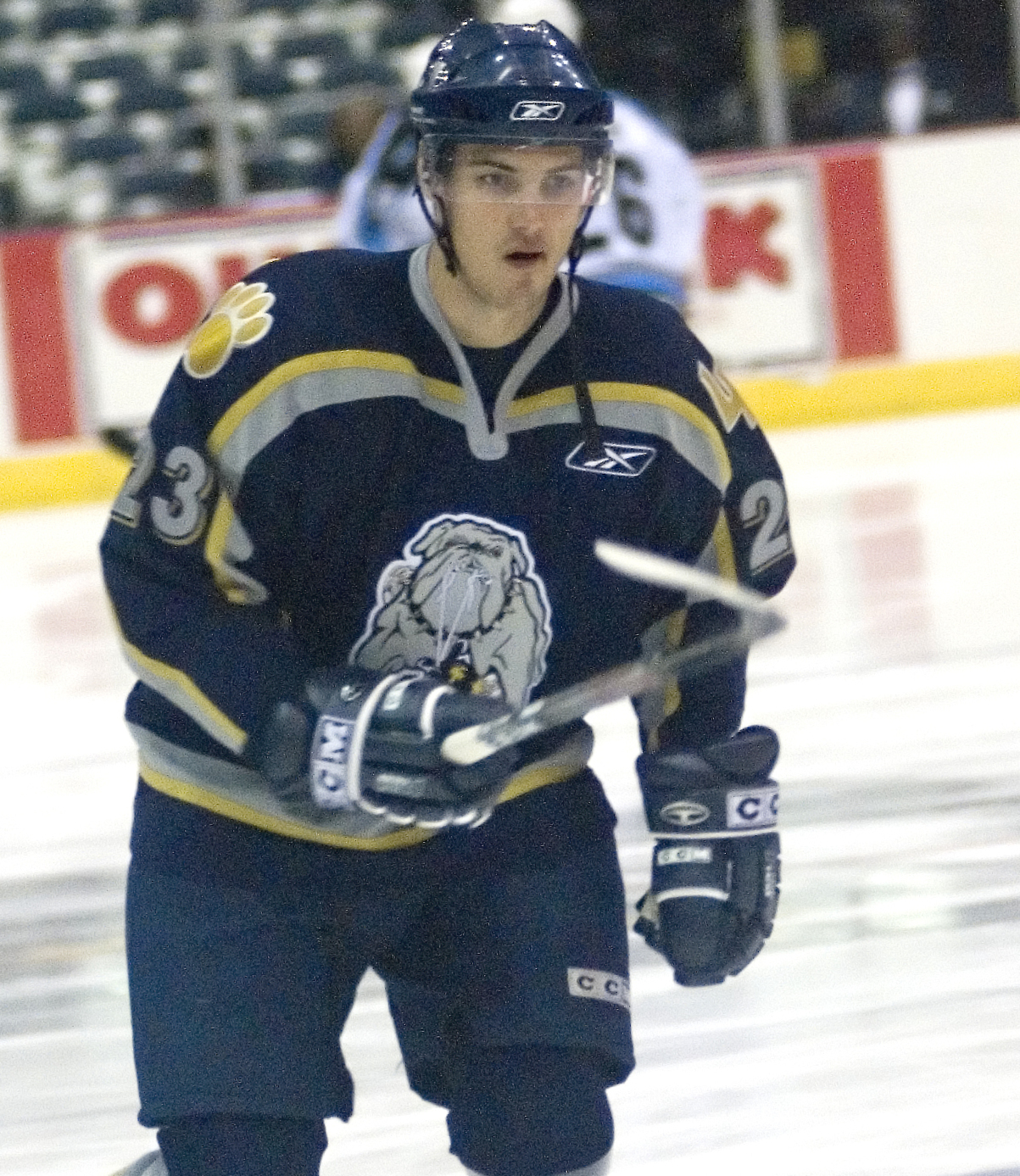
- Smirnov in 2007 with the Long Beach Ice Dogs
- Born: January 28, 1982 (age 44) Kalinin, Russian SFSR, Soviet Union
- Height: 6 ft 3 in (191 cm)
- Weight: 215 lb (98 kg; 15 st 5 lb)
- Position: Center
- Shot: Left
- Played for: HC Shakhtyor Soligorsk; HK Almaty; Yuzhny Ural Orsk; THK Tver; Buran Voronezh; Toros Neftekamsk; Khimik Voskresensk; Dynamo Moscow; CSKA Moscow; Avangard Omsk; Vityaz Podolsk; Krylya Sovetov Moscow; Mighty Ducks of Anaheim
- NHL draft: 12th overall, 2000; Mighty Ducks of Anaheim
- Playing career: 1999–2015

Alexei Sergeevich Smirnov (Russian: Алексей Сергеевич Смирнов; born January 28, 1982) is a Russian former professional ice hockey player. He mainly played in the Russian Superleague and Kontinental Hockey League, and also played 52 games in the National Hockey League between 2002 and 2004 with the Mighty Ducks of Anaheim, who selected him 12th overall in the 2000 NHL entry draft. Internationally Smirnov played for the Russian national under-18 team at the 1999 and 2000 Under-18 World Championships, winning a silver medal in 2000. He retired in 2015.

== Playing career ==
Smirnov was drafted 12th overall in the 2000 NHL entry draft by the Mighty Ducks of Anaheim. He played 52 games for the Mighty Ducks over two seasons between 2002 and 2004 before returning to Russia, playing around there until retiring in 2015.

== Personal ==
Has a son named Patrick.

Smirnov and his family live in Malibu and St. Louis during the off-season.

== Career statistics ==
=== Regular season and playoffs ===
			Regular season					Playoffs
Season	Team	League	GP	G	A	Pts	PIM	GP	G	A	Pts	PIM
1996–97	THK Tver	RUS.3	15	3	3	6	0	—	—	—	—	—
1998–99	Dynamo–2 Moscow	RUS.2	27	9	3	12	24	—	—	—	—	—
1999–2000	Dynamo Moscow	RSL	1	0	0	0	0	—	—	—	—	—
1999–2000	Dynamo–2 Moscow	RUS.3	5	1	2	3	14	—	—	—	—	—
1999–2000	THK Tver	RUS.2	28	3	1	4	53	—	—	—	—	—
2000–01	Dynamo Moscow	RSL	29	2	0	2	16	—	—	—	—	—
2001–02	CSKA Moscow	RSL	51	5	11	16	42	—	—	—	—	—
2001–02	CSKA–2 Moscow	RUS.3	2	1	0	1	0	—	—	—	—	—
2002–03	Mighty Ducks of Anaheim	NHL	44	3	2	5	18	4	0	0	0	2
2002–03	Cincinnati Mighty Ducks	AHL	19	7	3	10	12	—	—	—	—	—
2003–04	Mighty Ducks of Anaheim	NHL	8	0	1	1	2	—	—	—	—	—
2003–04	Cincinnati Mighty Ducks	AHL	51	9	10	19	34	2	0	0	0	2
2004–05	Cincinnati Mighty Ducks	AHL	65	9	9	18	53	—	—	—	—	—
2005–06	Avangard Omsk	RSL	27	1	2	3	18	10	1	1	2	18
2005–06	Avangard–2 Omsk	RUS.3	12	9	5	14	22	—	—	—	—	—
2006–07	Long Beach Ice Dogs	ECHL	38	12	19	31	44	—	—	—	—	—
2007–08	Vityaz Chekhov	RSL	8	0	1	1	10	—	—	—	—	—
2007–08	Vityaz–2 Podolsk	RUS.3	1	1	1	2	2	—	—	—	—	—
2007–08	Krylia Sovetov Moscow	RUS.2	9	0	2	2	4	—	—	—	—	—
2007–08	Khimik Voskresensk	RUS.2	8	3	5	8	14	12	4	1	5	8
2008–09	Khimik Voskresensk	KHL	55	15	7	22	38	—	—	—	—	—
2009–10	Gazovik Tyumen	RUS.2	7	0	1	1	4	—	—	—	—	—
2009–10	Khimik Voskresensk	RUS.2	22	5	7	12	35	5	1	1	2	2
2010–11	THK Tver	RUS.3	22	12	14	26	20	—	—	—	—	—
2010–11	Toros Neftekamsk	VHL	26	5	4	9	24	12	2	1	3	6
2011–12	Toros Neftekamsk	VHL	43	19	11	30	28	16	0	2	2	2
2012–13	Buran Voronezh	VHL	31	12	7	19	12	—	—	—	—	—
2012–13	THK Tver	VHL	20	4	5	9	37	—	—	—	—	—
2013–14	Yuzhny Ural Orsk	VHL	9	1	1	2	6	—	—	—	—	—
2013–14	HC Almaty	KAZ	22	7	3	10	14	—	—	—	—	—
2014–15	Shakhtyor Soligorsk	BLR	38	4	10	14	22	3	0	0	0	0
RSL & KHL totals			171	23	21	44	124	10	1	1	2	18
NHL totals			52	3	3	6	20	4	0	0	0	2

=== International ===
Medal record

Representing Russia

Ice hockey

World U18 Championships
Silver medal – second place	2000 Switzerland	

Year	Team	Event	GP	G	A	Pts	PIM
1999	Russia	WJC18	6	1	1	2	6
2000	Russia	WJC18	6	3	4	7	16
Junior totals			12	4	5	9	22

Preceded by Vitaly Vishnevski	Anaheim Ducks first-round draft pick 2000	Succeeded by Stanislav Chistov
