= Pavel Trnka =

Czech ice hockey player (born 1976)

- Born: July 27, 1976 (age 49) Plzeň, Czechoslovakia
- Height: 6 ft 3 in (191 cm)
- Weight: 198 lb (90 kg; 14 st 2 lb)
- Position: Defence
- Shot: Left
- Played for: Mighty Ducks of Anaheim; Florida Panthers; HC Plzeň; HC Kladno; HC Vítkovice
- NHL draft: 106th overall, 1994; Mighty Ducks of Anaheim
- Playing career: 1993–2012

Pavel Trnka (born July 27, 1976) is a Czech former professional ice hockey defenceman. He played seven seasons in the National Hockey League with the Mighty Ducks of Anaheim and Florida Panthers between 1997 and 2004. The rest of his career, which lasted from 1993 to 2012, was mainly spent in the Czech Extraliga. Internationally Trnka played for the Czech national team at both the junior and senior level. After retiring from play, Trnka went into coaching, and has worked with HC Vítkovice at their senior and youth level since 2012.

Trnka was drafted 106th overall by the Mighty Ducks of Anaheim in the 1994 NHL entry draft and started his NHL career with the Ducks in 1997 and stayed there for six seasons before he was traded to the Florida Panthers for Sandis Ozolinsh and Lance Ward. In total, Trnka played 411 regular season games, scoring 14 goals and 63 assists for 77 points and collecting 323 penalty minutes. He left the NHL after the 2004 season to return to the Czech Republic for HC Lasselsberger Plzeň. He had two spells in Sweden's Elitserien for Leksands IF and Malmö Redhawks.

== Career statistics ==
=== Regular season and playoffs ===
			Regular season					Playoffs
Season	Team	League	GP	G	A	Pts	PIM	GP	G	A	Pts	PIM
1992–93	HC Škoda Plzeň	CZE U20	—	—	—	—	—	—	—	—	—	—
1993–94	HC Škoda Plzeň	ELH	11	0	0	0	12	—	—	—	—	—
1994–95	HC Interconnex Plzeň	ELH	6	0	0	0	0	—	—	—	—	—
1994–95	Poldi SONP Kladno	ELH	28	0	5	5	24	—	—	—	—	—
1995–96	Baltimore Bandits	AHL	69	2	6	8	44	6	0	0	0	2
1996–97	Baltimore Bandits	AHL	69	6	14	20	86	3	0	0	0	2
1997–98	Mighty Ducks of Anaheim	NHL	48	3	4	7	40	—	—	—	—	—
1997–98	Cincinnati Mighty Ducks	AHL	23	3	5	8	28	—	—	—	—	—
1998–99	Mighty Ducks of Anaheim	NHL	63	0	4	4	60	4	0	1	1	2
1999–2000	Mighty Ducks of Anaheim	NHL	57	2	15	17	34	—	—	—	—	—
2000–01	Mighty Ducks of Anaheim	NHL	59	1	7	8	42	—	—	—	—	—
2001–02	Mighty Ducks of Anaheim	NHL	71	2	11	13	66	—	—	—	—	—
2002–03	Mighty Ducks of Anaheim	NHL	24	3	6	9	6	—	—	—	—	—
2002–03	Florida Panthers	NHL	22	0	3	3	24	—	—	—	—	—
2003–04	Florida Panthers	NHL	67	3	13	16	51	—	—	—	—	—
2004–05	HC Lasselsberger Plzeň	ELH	47	7	10	17	103	—	—	—	—	—
2005–06	HC Lasselsberger Plzeň	ELH	38	8	6	14	40	—	—	—	—	—
2005–06	Leksands IF	SEL	7	0	3	3	8	—	—	—	—	—
2006–07	HC Lasselsberger Plzeň	ELH	28	3	2	5	62	—	—	—	—	—
2006–07	Malmö Redhawks	SEL	20	0	1	1	36	—	—	—	—	—
2007–08	HC Vítkovice Steel	ELH	48	1	3	4	70	—	—	—	—	—
2008–09	HC Vítkovice Steel	ELH	31	1	8	9	20	7	0	1	1	10
2009–10	HC Vítkovice Steel	ELH	46	1	6	7	42	16	0	1	1	16
2010–11	HC Vítkovice Steel	ELH	49	2	7	9	48	15	0	8	8	26
2011–12	HC Vítkovice Steel	ELH	34	0	5	5	16	3	0	0	0	4
ELH totals			366	23	52	75	437	41	0	10	10	56
NHL totals			411	14	63	77	323	4	0	1	1	2

=== International ===
Medal record

Representing Czech Republic

Men's ice hockey

European Junior Championships
Bronze medal – third place	1994 Finland	

Year	Team	Event	GP	G	A	Pts	PIM
1994	Czech Republic	EJC	5	0	1	1	6
1995	Czech Republic	WJC	7	0	0	0	8
2003	Czech Republic	WC	5	1	0	1	6
Junior totals			12	0	1	1	14
Senior totals			5	1	0	1	6
