= Kevin Sawyer =

- Born: February 18, 1974 (age 52) Christina Lake, British Columbia, Canada
- Height: 6 ft 2 in (188 cm)
- Weight: 205 lb (93 kg; 14 st 9 lb)
- Position: Right wing
- Shot: Left
- Played for: St. Louis Blues; Boston Bruins; Phoenix Coyotes; Mighty Ducks of Anaheim
- NHL draft: Undrafted
- Playing career: 1995–2003

Kevin John Sawyer (born February 18, 1974) is a Canadian former professional ice hockey right winger who played in the National Hockey League (NHL) with the St. Louis Blues, Boston Bruins, Phoenix Coyotes, and Mighty Ducks of Anaheim between 1995 and 2003. He also spent several years in the minor American Hockey League and International Hockey League.

== Playing career ==
After playing three years with the Spokane Chiefs of the WHL Sawyer was signed by the St. Louis Blues in 1995. While with the Chiefs, Sawyer established himself as a hard hitting enforcer, and he would continue this role in the NHL. For the 1995–1996 season, Sawyer played the majority of the year with the Worcester IceCats while also making his NHL debut with the Blues. He appeared in six games with the Blues before being traded to the Boston Bruins in a deal that sent Steve Leach to the Blues. Sawyer appeared in two more games with the Bruins that year. The 1996–1997 season saw Sawyer play 60 games with the Providence Bruins and two games with the Boston Bruins. After that year he was released by the Bruins.

The next three years saw Sawyer toil in the minors with the Michigan K-Wings, Worcester IceCats, and Springfield Falcons. He signed contracts with the Dallas Stars in 1997 and again with the Blues in 1998 but he did not appear in any games with the teams. Sawyer signed with the Phoenix Coyotes for the 1999–2000 season and finally returned to the NHL where he played three games with the Coyotes.

Sawyer then signed with the Mighty Ducks of Anaheim in 2000. With the Mighty Ducks, Sawyer finally saw regular playing time in the NHL and established himself as a top enforcer. After playing only nine games with the Mighty Ducks in the 2000–2001 season, Sawyer made the team for the 2001–2002 season. He appeared in 57 games and logged 221 penalty minutes along with his first career NHL goal. That year he was also involved in a large brawl in a game between the Mighty Ducks and Calgary Flames. After Craig Berube hit Mighty Ducks' goalie Jean-Sébastien Giguère, Sawyer skated in the Flames zone on the next play and rammed into Flames' goalie Mike Vernon, leading to a number of fights and more than 300 penalty minutes between the teams in the final minutes of the game.

The 2002–2003 season saw Sawyer play 31 games with the Mighty Ducks before suffering a concussion in a fight with Brad Norton. He missed the remainder of the season and officially announced his retirement in 2003.

== Post-playing career ==
Sawyer now works as a commentator for Sportsnet's coverage of Calgary Flames games; he previously worked for TSN doing regional broadcasts for the Winnipeg Jets. On a January 4, 2020 broadcast, Sawyer admitted that he was involved in a player hazing incident as an assistant coach with the Spokane Chiefs.

== Career statistics ==
=== Regular season and playoffs ===
			Regular season					Playoffs
Season	Team	League	GP	G	A	Pts	PIM	GP	G	A	Pts	PIM
1991–92	Grand Forks Border Bruins	KIJHL	24	9	11	20	200	—	—	—	—	—
1991–92	Kelowna Spartans	BCHL	3	0	0	0	9	—	—	—	—	—
1991–92	Vernon Lakers	BCHL	12	0	1	1	18	—	—	—	—	—
1991–92	Penticton Panthers	BCHL	3	0	0	0	13	—	—	—	—	—
1992–93	Spokane Chiefs	WHL	62	4	3	7	274	8	1	1	2	13
1993–94	Spokane Chiefs	WHL	60	10	15	25	350	3	0	1	1	6
1994–95	Spokane Chiefs	WHL	54	7	9	16	365	11	2	0	2	58
1994–95	Peoria Rivermen	IHL	—	—	—	—	—	2	0	0	0	12
1995–96	St. Louis Blues	NHL	6	0	0	0	23	—	—	—	—	—
1995–96	Worcester IceCats	AHL	41	3	4	7	268	—	—	—	—	—
1995–96	Boston Bruins	NHL	2	0	0	0	5	—	—	—	—	—
1995–96	Providence Bruins	AHL	4	0	0	0	29	4	0	1	1	9
1996–97	Boston Bruins	NHL	2	0	0	0	0	—	—	—	—	—
1996–97	Providence Bruins	AHL	60	8	9	17	367	6	0	0	0	32
1997–98	Michigan K-Wings	IHL	60	2	5	7	398	3	0	0	0	23
1998–99	Worcester IceCats	AHL	70	8	14	22	299	4	0	1	1	4
1999–00	Phoenix Coyotes	NHL	3	0	0	0	12	—	—	—	—	—
1999–00	Springfield Falcons	AHL	56	4	8	12	321	4	0	0	0	6
2000–01	Mighty Ducks of Anaheim	NHL	9	0	1	1	27	—	—	—	—	—
2000–01	Cincinnati Mighty Ducks	AHL	41	2	12	14	211	—	—	—	—	—
2001–02	Mighty Ducks of Anaheim	NHL	57	1	1	2	211	—	—	—	—	—
2002–03	Mighty Ducks of Anaheim	NHL	31	2	1	3	115	—	—	—	—	—
AHL totals			272	25	47	72	1495	18	0	2	2	51
NHL totals			110	3	3	6	403	—	—	—	—	—
