= Stanislav Chistov =

Russian ice hockey player (born 1983)

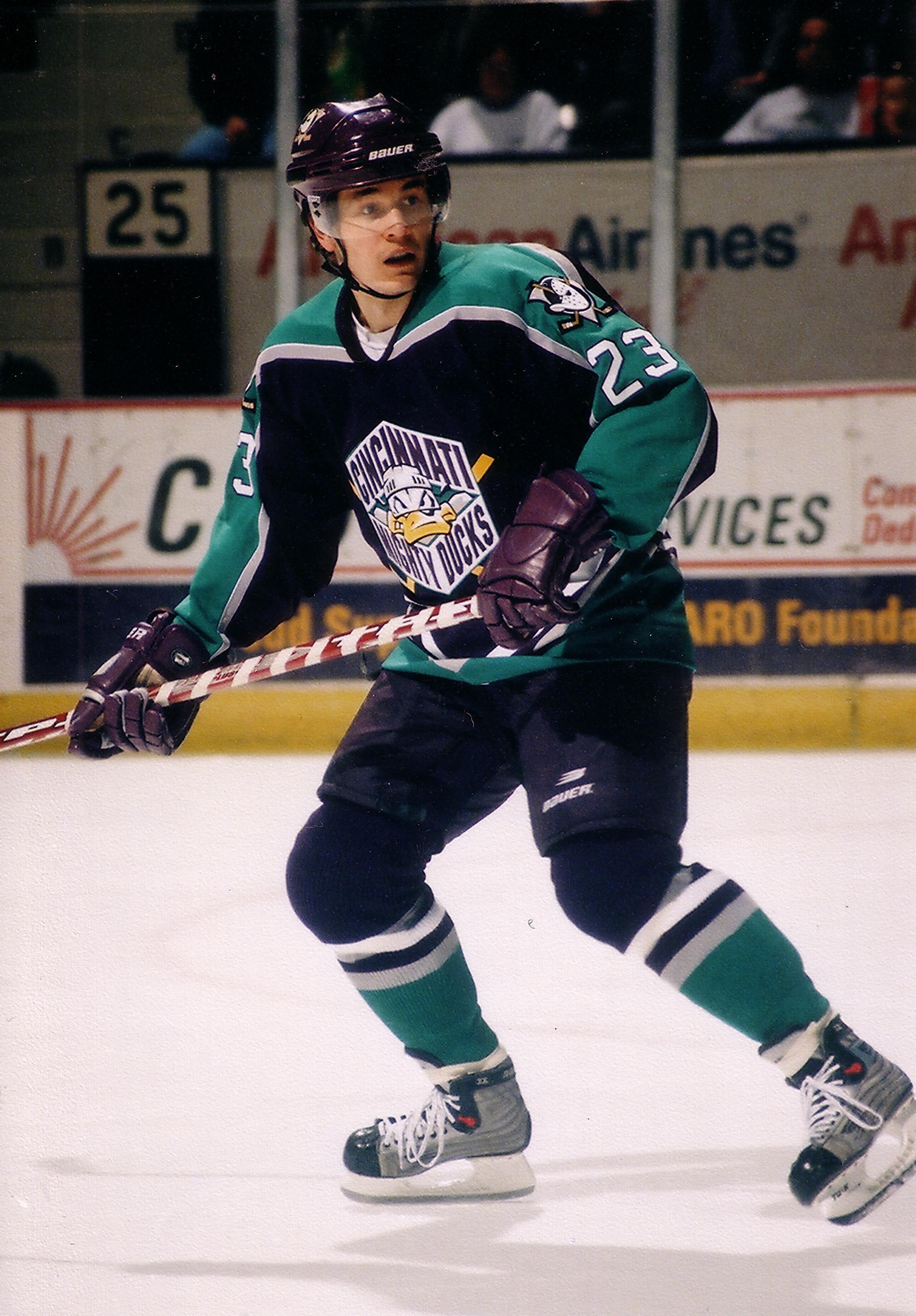
- Chistov with the Cincinnati Mighty Ducks in 2004
- Born: April 17, 1983 (age 43) Chelyabinsk, Russian SFSR, Soviet Union
- Height: 5 ft 10 in (178 cm)
- Weight: 200 lb (91 kg; 14 st 4 lb)
- Position: Left wing
- Shot: Right
- Played for: Avangard Omsk; Anaheim Ducks; Metallurg Magnitogorsk; Boston Bruins; Salavat Yulaev Ufa; Traktor Chelyabinsk; Lokomotiv Yaroslavl; Avtomobilist Yekaterinburg; HC Spartak Moscow; Dinamo Riga; HC Lada Togliatti
- NHL draft: 5th overall, 2001; Mighty Ducks of Anaheim
- Playing career: 1999–2019

Stanislav Mikhailovich Chistov (Russian: Станислав Михайлович Чистов; born April 17, 1983) is a Russian former professional ice hockey player.

== Playing career ==
Prior to playing professionally, Chistov played for the Georgetown Raiders Junior A hockey club in Georgetown, Ontario.

Chistov began his career in the Avangard Omsk organization, playing for their Russian Superleague team in Omsk from 1999–2002. In the 2001 NHL entry draft, Chistov was drafted fifth overall by the Mighty Ducks of Anaheim. While military obligations complicated Chistov's transfer to North America, he and fellow draftee Alexander Frolov left Russia anyway, in 2002, ultimately signing with the Ducks after a prolonged dispute with Russian officials.

In his rookie season in the NHL (2002–03), Chistov managed 30 points in 79 regular season games. The next year, Chistov struggled, and he was sent down to Anaheim's American Hockey League (AHL) affiliate, the Cincinnati Mighty Ducks. He remained there during the 2004–05 NHL lockout, until he decided he did not want to play in the minor pros, and he and the club parted ways.

Chistov returned to Russia for the 2005–06 season, where he enjoyed a solid campaign playing on Evgeni Malkin's line for the Super League's Metallurg Magnitogorsk. In the summer of 2006, Chistov signed a two-year, one-way contract with the Anaheim Ducks. On November 13, 2006, Chistov was traded to the Boston Bruins for a third round draft pick in the 2008 NHL entry draft. In the summer of 2007, Chistov signed with Salavat Yulaev Ufa of the Russian Super League. By February 2008, Chistov had parted ways with Salavat Yulaev Ufa, and while he was reportedly skating with the Boston Bruins' minor league affiliate, the Providence Bruins, he did not return to the Bruins.

On August 23, 2008, he moved from Avangard Omsk to Metallurg Magnitogorsk.

== Career statistics ==
=== Regular season and playoffs ===
			Regular season					Playoffs
Season	Team	League	GP	G	A	Pts	PIM	GP	G	A	Pts	PIM
1998–99	Traktor–2 Chelyabinsk	RUS.3	1	0	0	0	0	—	—	—	—	—
1998–99	Georgetown Raiders	OPJHL	14	10	7	17	21	—	—	—	—	—
1999–2000	Avangard Omsk	RSL	3	1	0	1	2	—	—	—	—	—
1999–2000	Avangard–2 Omsk	RUS.3	18	12	4	16	24	—	—	—	—	—
2000–01	Avangard Omsk	RSL	24	4	8	12	12	5	0	0	0	2
2000–01	Avangard–2 Omsk	RUS.3	8	5	4	9	2	—	—	—	—	—
2001–02	Avangard Omsk	RSL	9	0	0	0	4	—	—	—	—	—
2001–02	Avangard–2 Omsk	RUS.3	6	4	6	10	4	—	—	—	—	—
2001–02	CSKA–2 Moscow	RUS.3	1	1	2	3	0	—	—	—	—	—
2002–03	Mighty Ducks of Anaheim	NHL	79	12	18	30	54	21	4	2	6	8
2003–04	Mighty Ducks of Anaheim	NHL	56	2	16	18	26	—	—	—	—	—
2003–04	Cincinnati Mighty Ducks	AHL	23	5	8	13	45	9	6	2	8	4
2004–05	Cincinnati Mighty Ducks	AHL	79	15	23	38	141	9	2	1	3	6
2005–06	Metallurg Magnitogorsk	RSL	47	11	21	32	97	11	4	4	8	14
2006–07	Anaheim Ducks	NHL	1	0	0	0	0	—	—	—	—	—
2006–07	Portland Pirates	AHL	3	1	0	1	0	—	—	—	—	—
2006–07	Boston Bruins	NHL	60	5	8	13	36	—	—	—	—	—
2007–08	Salavat Yulaev Ufa	RSL	9	1	3	4	10	—	—	—	—	—
2007–08	Salavat Yulaev–2 Ufa	RUS.3	6	4	3	7	6	—	—	—	—	—
2008–09	Metallurg Magnitogorsk	KHL	56	11	19	30	93	12	1	4	5	14
2009–10	Metallurg Magnitogorsk	KHL	47	18	21	39	28	10	3	2	5	6
2010–11	Metallurg Magnitogorsk	KHL	54	13	16	29	20	20	5	8	13	4
2011–12	Traktor Chelyabinsk	KHL	54	13	12	25	32	16	6	4	10	16
2012–13	Traktor Chelyabinsk	KHL	51	10	12	22	34	25	2	13	15	12
2013–14	Traktor Chelyabinsk	KHL	54	9	9	18	16	—	—	—	—	—
2014–15	Traktor Chelyabinsk	KHL	60	12	21	33	28	6	1	4	5	6
2015–16	Traktor Chelyabinsk	KHL	36	1	9	10	2	—	—	—	—	—
2015–16	Lokomotiv Yaroslavl	KHL	13	5	3	8	6	5	0	1	1	0
2016–17	Lokomotiv Yaroslavl	KHL	30	6	3	9	16	—	—	—	—	—
2016–17	Avtomobilist Yekaterinburg	KHL	13	2	5	7	6	—	—	—	—	—
2017–18	Spartak Moscow	KHL	1	0	0	0	0	—	—	—	—	—
2017–18	Khimik Voskresensk	VHL	9	2	5	7	6	—	—	—	—	—
2017–18	Dinamo Riga	KHL	7	0	0	0	0	—	—	—	—	—
2018–19	Lada Togliatti	VHL	53	11	28	39	16	3	1	0	1	0
RSL totals			92	17	32	49	125	16	4	4	8	16
NHL totals			196	19	42	61	116	21	4	2	6	8
KHL totals			476	100	130	230	281	94	18	36	54	58

=== International ===
Year	Team	Event	Result	GP	G	A	Pts	PIM
2000	Russia	U17	1st place, gold medalist(s)	6	3	5	8	4
2001	Russia	WJC	7th	7	5	1	6	0
2001	Russia	WJC18	1st place, gold medalist(s)	4	4	2	6	0
2002	Russia	WJC	1st place, gold medalist(s)	7	4	4	8	0
Junior totals				24	16	12	28	4

Awards and achievements
Preceded by Alexei Smirnov	Anaheim Ducks first-round draft pick 2001	Succeeded by Joffrey Lupul
