= 2002–03 Dallas Stars season =

National Hockey League team season

2002–03 Dallas Stars
- Pacific Division champions
- Division: 1st Pacific
- Conference: 1st Western
- 2002–03 record: 46–17–15–4
- Home record: 28–5–6–2
- Road record: 18–12–9–2
- Goals for: 245
- Goals against: 169

Team information
- General manager: Doug Armstrong
- Coach: Dave Tippett
- Captain: Derian Hatcher
- Alternate captains: Mike Modano; Sergei Zubov
- Arena: American Airlines Center
- Average attendance: 18,532
- Minor league affiliate: Utah Grizzlies

Team leaders
- Goals: Jere Lehtinen (31)
- Assists: Mike Modano (57)
- Points: Mike Modano (85)
- Penalty minutes: Brenden Morrow (134)
- Plus/minus: Jere Lehtinen (+39)
- Wins: Marty Turco (31)
- Goals against average: Marty Turco (1.72)

The 2002–03 Dallas Stars season was the Stars' tenth season, 36th overall of the franchise.

== Off-season ==
Dave Tippett was named the team’s new head coach on May 16, 2002.

== Regular season ==
- January 20, 2003: In a game against the Dallas Stars, Patrick Roy becomes the first goaltender to appear in 1,000 regular season games. At the end of the game, Marty Turco raised his mask to praise Patrick.

The Stars led all NHL teams in most shutouts for, with 11.

=== Final standings ===
Pacific Division
No.	CR		GP	W	L	T	OTL	GF	GA	Pts
1	1	**Dallas Stars**	82	46	17	15	4	245	169	111
2	7	**Mighty Ducks of Anaheim**	82	40	27	9	6	203	193	95
3	10	Los Angeles Kings	82	33	37	6	6	203	221	78
4	11	Phoenix Coyotes	82	31	35	11	5	204	230	78
5	14	San Jose Sharks	82	28	37	9	8	214	239	73

Note: CR = Conference rank; GP = Games played; W = Wins; L = Losses; T = Ties; OTL = Overtime loss; GF = Goals for; GA = Goals against; Pts = Points
Bolded teams qualified for the playoffs.

Western Conference
R		Div	GP	W	L	T	OTL	GF	GA	Pts
**1**	**Z-** Dallas Stars	**PA**	**82**	**46**	**17**	**15**	**4**	**245**	**169**	111
**2**	**Y-** Detroit Red Wings	**CE**	**82**	**48**	**20**	**10**	**4**	**269**	**203**	110
**3**	**Y-** Colorado Avalanche	**NW**	**82**	**42**	**19**	**13**	**8**	**251**	**194**	105
**4**	**X-** Vancouver Canucks	**NW**	**82**	**45**	**23**	**13**	**1**	**264**	**208**	104
**5**	**X-** St. Louis Blues	**CE**	**82**	**41**	**24**	**11**	**6**	**253**	**222**	99
**6**	**X-** Minnesota Wild	**NW**	**82**	**42**	**29**	**10**	**1**	**198**	**178**	95
**7**	**X-** Mighty Ducks of Anaheim	**PA**	**82**	**40**	**27**	**9**	**6**	**203**	**193**	95
**8**	**X-** Edmonton Oilers	**NW**	**82**	**36**	**26**	**11**	**9**	**231**	**230**	92
8.5
9	Chicago Blackhawks	CE	82	30	33	13	6	207	226	79
10	Los Angeles Kings	PA	82	33	37	6	6	203	221	78
11	Phoenix Coyotes	PA	82	31	35	11	5	204	230	78
12	Calgary Flames	NW	82	29	36	13	4	186	228	75
13	Nashville Predators	CE	82	27	35	13	7	183	206	74
14	San Jose Sharks	PA	82	28	37	9	8	214	239	73
15	Columbus Blue Jackets	CE	82	29	42	8	3	213	263	69

Divisions: PA – Pacific, CE – Central, NW – Northwest

Z – Clinched conference; Y – Clinched division; X – Clinched playoff spot

== Playoffs ==
The Stars found themselves back in the playoffs, but fell in the second round to the eventual Western Conference Champions, the Mighty Ducks of Anaheim.

== Schedule and results ==
=== Regular season ===
2002–03 regular season
October: 6–2–2–1 (home: 3–0–0–1; road: 3–2–2–0)

Game	Date	Score	Opponent	Record	Recap
1	October 9, 2002	1–1 OT	@ Colorado Avalanche (2002–03)	0–0–1–0	T
2	October 11, 2002	4–2	Mighty Ducks of Anaheim (2002–03)	1–0–1–0	W
3	October 12, 2002	5–2	@ Phoenix Coyotes (2002–03)	2–0–1–0	W
4	October 15, 2002	3–0	Edmonton Oilers (2002–03)	3–0–1–0	W
5	October 17, 2002	1–3	@ Minnesota Wild (2002–03)	3–1–1–0	L
6	October 19, 2002	3–5	@ St. Louis Blues (2002–03)	3–2–1–0	L
7	October 20, 2002	5–2	Washington Capitals (2002–03)	4–2–1–0	W
8	October 24, 2002	3–3 OT	@ Calgary Flames (2002–03)	4–2–2–0	T
9	October 26, 2002	4–1	@ Vancouver Canucks (2002–03)	5–2–2–0	W
10	October 28, 2002	4–3 OT	@ Edmonton Oilers (2002–03)	6–2–2–0	W
11	October 30, 2002	2–3 OT	Florida Panthers (2002–03)	6–2–2–1	OTL

November: 9–4–3–0 (home: 6–0–1–0; road: 3–4–2–0)

Game	Date	Score	Opponent	Record	Recap
12	November 1, 2002	2–4	@ Columbus Blue Jackets (2002–03)	6–3–2–1	L
13	November 3, 2002	3–3 OT	@ Detroit Red Wings (2002–03)	6–3–3–1	T
14	November 6, 2002	4–0	Vancouver Canucks (2002–03)	7–3–3–1	W
15	November 8, 2002	2–1	Toronto Maple Leafs (2002–03)	8–3–3–1	W
16	November 10, 2002	2–3	@ New York Islanders (2002–03)	8–4–3–1	L
17	November 12, 2002	4–2	@ Montreal Canadiens (2002–03)	9–4–3–1	W
18	November 13, 2002	6–1	@ Washington Capitals (2002–03)	10–4–3–1	W
19	November 15, 2002	4–2	Colorado Avalanche (2002–03)	11–4–3–1	W
20	November 17, 2002	3–2 OT	Columbus Blue Jackets (2002–03)	12–4–3–1	W
21	November 20, 2002	2–2 OT	@ Phoenix Coyotes (2002–03)	12–4–4–1	T
22	November 22, 2002	4–0	@ Mighty Ducks of Anaheim (2002–03)	13–4–4–1	W
23	November 23, 2002	0–2	@ Los Angeles Kings (2002–03)	13–5–4–1	L
24	November 25, 2002	5–1	Phoenix Coyotes (2002–03)	14–5–4–1	W
25	November 27, 2002	5–0	Minnesota Wild (2002–03)	15–5–4–1	W
26	November 29, 2002	3–3 OT	New York Rangers (2002–03)	15–5–5–1	T
27	November 30, 2002	2–5	@ Nashville Predators (2002–03)	15–6–5–1	L

December: 5–4–4–0 (home: 3–1–2–0; road: 2–3–2–0)

Game	Date	Score	Opponent	Record	Recap
28	December 4, 2002	5–1	Montreal Canadiens (2002–03)	16–6–5–1	W
29	December 6, 2002	3–3 OT	Detroit Red Wings (2002–03)	16–6–6–1	T
30	December 11, 2002	0–3	Los Angeles Kings (2002–03)	16–7–6–1	L
31	December 13, 2002	3–1	Atlanta Thrashers (2002–03)	17–7–6–1	W
32	December 15, 2002	5–0	@ Chicago Blackhawks (2002–03)	18–7–6–1	W
33	December 17, 2002	2–2 OT	@ Philadelphia Flyers (2002–03)	18–7–7–1	T
34	December 19, 2002	1–1 OT	@ Detroit Red Wings (2002–03)	18–7–8–1	T
35	December 21, 2002	3–5	@ New Jersey Devils (2002–03)	18–8–8–1	L
36	December 22, 2002	0–1	@ Carolina Hurricanes (2002–03)	18–9–8–1	L
37	December 26, 2002	1–3	@ Nashville Predators (2002–03)	18–10–8–1	L
38	December 27, 2002	4–0	@ Florida Panthers (2002–03)	19–10–8–1	W
39	December 29, 2002	2–2 OT	Detroit Red Wings (2002–03)	19–10–9–1	T
40	December 31, 2002	4–1	Edmonton Oilers (2002–03)	20–10–9–1	W

January: 10–1–2–0 (home: 6–1–0–0; road: 4–0–2–0)

Game	Date	Score	Opponent	Record	Recap
41	January 2, 2003	3–1	@ San Jose Sharks (2002–03)	21–10–9–1	W
42	January 4, 2003	3–2	@ Los Angeles Kings (2002–03)	22–10–9–1	W
43	January 5, 2003	1–1 OT	@ Mighty Ducks of Anaheim (2002–03)	22–10–10–1	T
44	January 7, 2003	7–4	Los Angeles Kings (2002–03)	23–10–10–1	W
45	January 9, 2003	4–3 OT	Chicago Blackhawks (2002–03)	24–10–10–1	W
46	January 11, 2003	6–3	Colorado Avalanche (2002–03)	25–10–10–1	W
47	January 18, 2003	3–1	@ San Jose Sharks (2002–03)	26–10–10–1	W
48	January 20, 2003	1–1 OT	@ Colorado Avalanche (2002–03)	26–10–11–1	T
49	January 22, 2003	4–2	Columbus Blue Jackets (2002–03)	27–10–11–1	W
50	January 24, 2003	1–4	Tampa Bay Lightning (2002–03)	27–11–11–1	L
51	January 25, 2003	4–2	@ St. Louis Blues (2002–03)	28–11–11–1	W
52	January 27, 2003	5–3	Ottawa Senators (2002–03)	29–11–11–1	W
53	January 29, 2003	4–1	Calgary Flames (2002–03)	30–11–11–1	W

February: 5–2–4–1 (home: 3–1–3–0; road: 2–1–1–1)

Game	Date	Score	Opponent	Record	Recap
54	February 5, 2003	2–2 OT	St. Louis Blues (2002–03)	30–11–12–1	T
55	February 8, 2003	3–1	@ Phoenix Coyotes (2002–03)	31–11–12–1	W
56	February 9, 2003	3–1	Los Angeles Kings (2002–03)	32–11–12–1	W
57	February 11, 2003	2–1 OT	Carolina Hurricanes (2002–03)	33–11–12–1	W
58	February 14, 2003	2–4	Mighty Ducks of Anaheim (2002–03)	33–12–12–1	L
59	February 16, 2003	3–1	San Jose Sharks (2002–03)	34–12–12–1	W
60	February 19, 2003	1–1 OT	Calgary Flames (2002–03)	34–12–13–1	T
61	February 21, 2003	2–2 OT	Phoenix Coyotes (2002–03)	34–12–14–1	T
62	February 23, 2003	3–0	@ Chicago Blackhawks (2002–03)	35–12–14–1	W
63	February 25, 2003	5–5 OT	@ Boston Bruins (2002–03)	35–12–15–1	T
64	February 27, 2003	2–3 OT	@ Ottawa Senators (2002–03)	35–12–15–2	OTL
65	February 28, 2003	3–5	@ Buffalo Sabres (2002–03)	35–13–15–2	L

March: 9–4–0–2 (home: 5–2–0–1; road: 4–2–0–1)

Game	Date	Score	Opponent	Record	Recap
66	March 2, 2003	3–1	Pittsburgh Penguins (2002–03)	36–13–15–2	W
67	March 5, 2003	7–4	Chicago Blackhawks (2002–03)	37–13–15–2	W
68	March 7, 2003	1–2	Nashville Predators (2002–03)	37–14–15–2	L
69	March 9, 2003	3–0	San Jose Sharks (2002–03)	38–14–15–2	W
70	March 11, 2003	2–0	@ Columbus Blue Jackets (2002–03)	39–14–15–2	W
71	March 12, 2003	2–4	@ Minnesota Wild (2002–03)	39–15–15–2	L
72	March 15, 2003	3–4	@ Edmonton Oilers (2002–03)	39–16–15–2	L
73	March 17, 2003	2–4	Vancouver Canucks (2002–03)	39–17–15–2	L
74	March 19, 2003	5–4 OT	@ Atlanta Thrashers (2002–03)	40–17–15–2	W
75	March 21, 2003	2–3 OT	Minnesota Wild (2002–03)	40–17–15–3	OTL
76	March 23, 2003	3–1	St. Louis Blues (2002–03)	41–17–15–3	W
77	March 25, 2003	4–3	@ Vancouver Canucks (2002–03)	42–17–15–3	W
78	March 27, 2003	1–2 OT	@ Calgary Flames (2002–03)	42–17–15–4	OTL
79	March 29, 2003	4–3	@ San Jose Sharks (2002–03)	43–17–15–4	W
80	March 31, 2003	3–0	Buffalo Sabres (2002–03)	44–17–15–4	W

April: 2–0–0–0 (home: 2–0–0–0; road: 0–0–0–0)

Game	Date	Score	Opponent	Record	Recap
81	April 2, 2003	2–1	Mighty Ducks of Anaheim (2002–03)	45–17–15–4	W
82	April 6, 2003	2–0	Nashville Predators (2002–03)	46–17–15–4	W

Legend: W Win (2 points) L Loss (0 points) T Tie (1 point) OTL Overtime loss (1 point)

=== Playoffs ===
2003 Stanley Cup playoffs
Western Conference Quarterfinals vs. (8) Edmonton Oilers: Stars win 4–2

Game	Date	Score	Opponent	Series	Recap
1	April 9, 2003	1–2	Edmonton Oilers	Oilers lead 1–0	L
2	April 11, 2003	6–1	Edmonton Oilers	Series tied 1–1	W
3	April 13, 2003	2–3	@ Edmonton Oilers	Oilers lead 2–1	L
4	April 15, 2003	3–1	@ Edmonton Oilers	Series tied 2–2	W
5	April 17, 2003	5–2	Edmonton Oilers	Stars lead 3–2	W
6	April 19, 2003	3–2	@ Edmonton Oilers	Stars win 4–2	W

Western Conference Semifinals vs. (7) Anaheim Mighty Ducks: Mighty Ducks win 4–2

Game	Date	Score	Opponent	Series	Recap
1	April 24, 2003	3–4 5OT	Anaheim Mighty Ducks	Mighty Ducks lead 1–0	L
2	April 26, 2003	2–3 OT	Anaheim Mighty Ducks	Mighty Ducks lead 2–0	L
3	April 28, 2003	2–1	@ Anaheim Mighty Ducks	Mighty Ducks lead 2–1	W
4	April 30, 2003	0–1	@ Anaheim Mighty Ducks	Mighty Ducks lead 3–1	L
5	May 3, 2003	4–1	Anaheim Mighty Ducks	Mighty Ducks lead 3–2	W
6	May 5, 2003	3–4	@ Anaheim Mighty Ducks	Mighty Ducks win 4–2	L

Legend: W Win L Loss

== Player statistics ==
=== Scoring ===
- Position abbreviations: C = Center; D = Defense; G = Goaltender; LW = Left wing; RW = Right wing
- † = Joined team via a transaction (e.g., trade, waivers, signing) during the season. Stats reflect time with the Stars only.
- ‡ = Left team via a transaction (e.g., trade, waivers, release) during the season. Stats reflect time with the Stars only.

No.	Player	Pos	Regular season						Playoffs					
No.	Player	Pos	GP	G	A	Pts	+/-	PIM	GP	G	A	Pts	+/-	PIM
9	Mike Modano	C	79	28	57	85	34	30	12	5	10	15	2	4
56	Sergei Zubov	D	82	11	44	55	21	26	12	4	10	14	2	4
13	Bill Guerin	RW	64	25	25	50	5	113	4	0	0	0	−1	4
26	Jere Lehtinen	RW	80	31	17	48	39	20	12	3	2	5	1	0
44	Jason Arnott	C	72	23	24	47	9	51	11	3	2	5	−2	6
10	Brenden Morrow	LW	71	21	22	43	20	134	12	3	5	8	3	16
48	Scott Young	RW	79	23	19	42	24	30	10	4	3	7	5	6
77	Pierre Turgeon	C	65	12	30	42	4	18	5	0	1	1	1	0
11	Ulf Dahlen	LW	63	17	20	37	11	14	11	1	3	4	−3	0
5	Darryl Sydor	D	81	5	31	36	22	40	12	0	6	6	−3	6
39	Niko Kapanen	C	82	5	29	34	25	44	12	4	3	7	4	12
2	Derian Hatcher	D	82	8	22	30	37	106	11	1	2	3	8	33
43	Philippe Boucher	D	80	7	20	27	28	94	11	1	2	3	1	11
18	Rob DiMaio	RW	69	10	9	19	18	76	12	1	4	5	2	10
27	Manny Malhotra	C	59	3	7	10	−2	42	5	1	0	1	1	0
17	Stephane Robidas	D	76	3	7	10	15	35	12	0	1	1	1	20
29	Steve Ott	C	26	3	4	7	6	31	1	0	0	0	−1	0
14	Stu Barnes†	C	13	2	5	7	2	8	12	2	3	5	0	0
32	Claude Lemieux†	RW	32	2	4	6	−9	14	7	0	1	1	−1	10
24	Richard Matvichuk	D	68	1	5	6	1	58	12	0	3	3	1	8
22	Kirk Muller	LW	55	1	5	6	−6	18	12	1	1	2	0	8
33	Scott Pellerin‡	LW	20	1	3	4	−3	8	—	—	—	—	—	—
28	David Oliver	RW	6	0	3	3	1	2	6	0	0	0	−2	2
35	Marty Turco	G	55	0	3	3		16	12	0	0	0		8
3	John Erskine	D	16	2	0	2	1	29	—	—	—	—	—	—
47	Aaron Downey	RW	43	1	1	2	1	69	—	—	—	—	—	—
6	Sami Helenius‡	D	5	0	0	0	1	6	—	—	—	—	—	—
30	Corey Hirsch	G	2	0	0	0		0	—	—	—	—	—	—
32	Jim Montgomery	C	1	0	0	0	0	0	—	—	—	—	—	—
4 (Note: Odelein wore number 6 in his first game.)	Lyle Odelein†	D	3	0	0	0	0	6	2	0	0	0	−1	0
14	Jon Sim‡	LW	4	0	0	0	−1	0	—	—	—	—	—	—
31	Ron Tugnutt	G	31	0	0	0		0	—	—	—	—	—	—

=== Goaltending ===
No.	Player	Regular season										Playoffs								
No.	Player	GP	W	L	T	SA	GA	GAA	SV%	SO	TOI	GP	W	L	SA	GA	GAA	SV%	SO	TOI
35	Marty Turco	55	31	10	10	1359	92	1.72	.932	7	3203	12	6	6	310	25	1.88	.919	0	798
31	Ron Tugnutt	31	15	10	5	672	70	2.47	.896	4	1701	—	—	—	—	—	—	—	—	—
30	Corey Hirsch	2	0	1	0	39	4	2.47	.897	0	97	—	—	—	—	—	—	—	—	—

== Awards and records ==
=== Awards ===
Type	Award/honor	Recipient	Ref
League (annual)	Frank J. Selke Trophy	Jere Lehtinen	
League (annual)	NHL Second All-Star Team	Derian Hatcher (Defense)	
League (annual)	NHL Second All-Star Team	Marty Turco (Goaltender)	
League (annual)	Roger Crozier Saving Grace Award	Marty Turco	
League (in-season)	NHL All-Star Game selection	Bill Guerin (Note: Guerin and Modano were voted to the starting lineup.)	
League (in-season)	NHL All-Star Game selection	Mike Modano	
League (in-season)	NHL All-Star Game selection	Marty Turco	
League (in-season)	NHL Player of the Month	Marty Turco (January)	
League (in-season)	NHL Player of the Week	Bill Guerin (October 14)	
League (in-season)	NHL Player of the Week	Mike Modano (January 13)	
League (in-season)	NHL Player of the Week	Marty Turco (April 7) (Note: Co-winner with Milan Hejduk of the Colorado Avalanche.)	
League (in-season)	NHL YoungStars Game selection	Niko Kapanen	
Team	Star of the Game Award	Mike Modano	
Team	Star of the Game Award	Marty Turco	

=== Milestones ===
Milestone	Player	Date	Ref
500th game played	Ron Tugnutt	November 12, 2002	
1,000th point	Mike Modano	November 15, 2002	
1,000th game played	Scott Young	December 11, 2002	
First game	Steve Ott	December 13, 2002	
600th assist	Mike Modano	February 5, 2003	
1,000th game played	Mike Modano	February 11, 2003	
600th assist	Kirk Muller	March 5, 2003	
25th shutout	Ron Tugnutt	March 11, 2003	

== Transactions ==
The Stars were involved in the following transactions from June 14, 2002, the day after the deciding game of the 2002 Stanley Cup Finals, through June 9, 2003, the day of the deciding game of the 2003 Stanley Cup Finals.

=== Trades ===
Date	Details		Ref
June 18, 2002	To Dallas Stars: Ron Tugnutt; 2nd-round pick in 2002	To Columbus Blue Jackets: 1st-round pick in 2002	
June 22, 2002	To Dallas Stars: 2nd-round pick in 2002	To Tampa Bay Lightning: Brad Lukowich; 7th-round pick in 2003	
June 29, 2002	To Dallas Stars: David Gosselin; 5th-round pick in 2003	To Nashville Predators: Rights to Ed Belfour; Rights to Cameron Mann	
October 4, 2002	To Dallas Stars: Stephane Robidas	To Atlanta Thrashers: Future considerations (Note: 6th-round pick in 2003)	
January 16, 2003	To Dallas Stars: Claude Lemieux	To Phoenix Coyotes: Scott Pellerin; Conditional draft pick in 2004	
February 17, 2003	To Dallas Stars: Andrew Berenzweig; Conditional draft pick in 2004	To Nashville Predators: Jon Sim	
March 10, 2003	To Dallas Stars: Stu Barnes	To Buffalo Sabres: Rights to Michael Ryan; 2nd-round pick in 2003	
March 10, 2003	To Dallas Stars: Lyle Odelein	To Chicago Blackhawks: Sami Helenius; Conditional draft pick (Note: Chicago’s choice of an 8th-round pick in 2003 or a 7th-round pick in 2004. Chicago chose the 2004 pick.)	
March 11, 2003	To Dallas Stars: Dallas’ 6th-round pick in 2003; Future considerations	To Atlanta Thrashers: Rights to Anthony Aquino	

=== Players acquired ===
Date	Player	Former team	Term	Via	Ref
July 2, 2002	Philippe Boucher	Los Angeles Kings	4-year	Free agency	
July 3, 2002	Aaron Downey	Chicago Blackhawks	1-year (Note: Club option for a second year.)	Free agency	
July 3, 2002	Bill Guerin	Boston Bruins	5-year	Free agency	
July 5, 2002	Scott Young	St. Louis Blues	2-year	Free agency	
July 30, 2002	David Oliver	Munich Barons (DEL)	1-year	Free agency	
August 13, 2002	Ulf Dahlen	Washington Capitals	1-year	Free agency	
August 14, 2002	Corey Hirsch	Washington Capitals	1-year	Free agency	

=== Players lost ===
Date	Player	New team	Via (Note: In parentheses is the player's free agency group on July 1 if applicable.)	Ref
July 4, 2002	Randy McKay	Montreal Canadiens	Free agency (III)	
July 11, 2002	Brent Gilchrist	Nashville Predators	Free agency (III)	
August 26, 2002	Rick Tabaracci		Retirement (III)	
September 20, 2002	Chad Alban	Kalamazoo Wings (UHL)	Free agency (II)	
September 25, 2002	Gregor Baumgartner	Grand Rapids Griffins (AHL)	Free agency (UFA)	
September 30, 2002	Dave Manson		Retirement (III)	
October 2002	Andre Lakos	Augusta Lynx (ECHL)	Free agency (UFA)	
April 23, 2003	Pat Verbeek		Retirement (III)	

=== Signings ===
Date	Player	Term	Contract type	Ref
June 27, 2002	Manny Malhotra	2-year	Re-signing	
July 3, 2002	Sami Helenius	1-year	Re-signing	
July 3, 2002	Alexei Komarov	1-year	Entry-level	
July 24, 2002	Jeff MacMillan	1-year	Re-signing	
July 24, 2002	Jim Montgomery	1-year	Re-signing	
July 30, 2002	Jon Sim	1-year	Re-signing	
August 4, 2002	Jason Arnott	2-year	Arbitration award	
August 29, 2002	Steve Gainey	1-year	Re-signing	
September 3, 2002	Gavin Morgan	1-year	Re-signing	
September 26, 2002	Brenden Morrow	3-year	Re-signing	
October 8, 2002	Mike Smith	3-year	Entry-level	
October 16, 2002	Trevor Daley	3-year	Entry-level	
May 28, 2003	David Bararuk	3-year	Entry-level	

== Draft picks ==
Dallas's draft picks at the 2002 NHL entry draft held at the Air Canada Centre in Toronto, Ontario.

Round	#	Player	Nationality	College/Junior/Club team (League)
1	26	Martin Vagner	Czech Republic	Hull Olympiques (QMJHL)
2	32	Janos Vas	Hungary	Malmo IF (Sweden)
2	34	Tobias Stephan	Switzerland	EHC Chur (Switzerland)
2	42	Marius Holtet	Norway	Farjestad BK (Sweden)
2	43	Trevor Daley	Canada	Sault Ste. Marie Greyhounds (OHL)
3	78	Geoff Waugh	Canada	Kindersley Klippers (SJHL)
4	110	Jarkko Immonen	Finland	Blues Jr. (Finland)
5	147	David Bararuk	Canada	Moose Jaw Warriors (WHL)
6	180	Kirill Sidorenko	Russia	Zauralie Kurgan (Russia)
7	210	Bryan Hamm	Canada	Peterborough Petes (OHL)
8	243	Tuomas Mikkonen	Finland	JYP (Finland)
9	273	Ned Havern	United States	Boston College (Hockey East)

== See also ==
- 2002–03 NHL season
