= Vitaly Vishnevskiy =

Russian ice hockey player (born 1980)

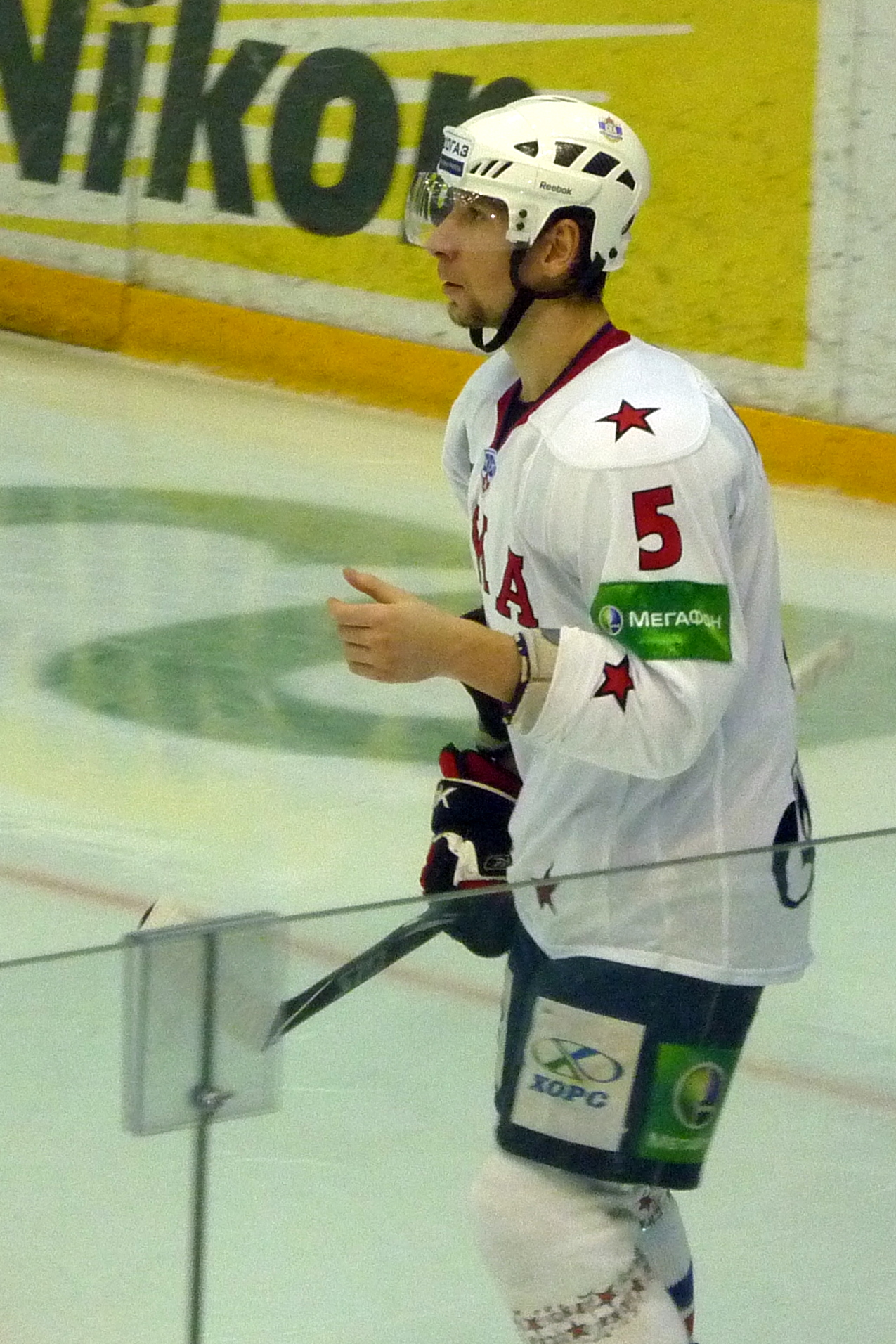
- Visknevskiy with SKA Saint Petersburg in 2010
- Born: March 18, 1980 (age 46) Kharkiv, Ukrainian SSR, Soviet Union
- Height: 6 ft 2 in (188 cm)
- Weight: 215 lb (98 kg; 15 st 5 lb)
- Position: Defence
- Shot: Left
- Played for: Lokomotiv Yaroslavl; Mighty Ducks of Anaheim; Khimik Moscow Oblast; Atlanta Thrashers; Nashville Predators; New Jersey Devils; SKA Saint Petersburg; Severstal Cherepovets
- National team: Russia
- NHL draft: 5th overall, 1998; Mighty Ducks of Anaheim
- Playing career: 1998–2015; 2017–2018

Vitaly Viktorovich Vishnevskiy (Russian: Виталий Викторович Вишневский, Ukrainian: Віталій Вікторович Вишневський; born March 18, 1980) is a Russian former professional ice hockey defenceman. He previously played in the National Hockey League for the Mighty Ducks of Anaheim, Atlanta Thrashers, Nashville Predators, and New Jersey Devils, as well as for Lokomotiv Yaroslavl, SKA St. Petersburg and Severstal Cherepovets in the KHL.

== Playing career ==
Vishnevsky began playing hockey in the Ukrainian SSR with his local organization Dynamo Kharkiv, but moved as a child to Russia and Torpedo Yaroslavl.

After playing in the Russian Super League for Torpedo Yaroslavl, Vishnevsky was drafted 5th overall by the Mighty Ducks of Anaheim in the 1998 NHL entry draft. He came to North America to start the 1999–2000 season playing for the Ducks affiliate the Cincinnati Mighty Ducks of the American Hockey League. He also made his NHL debut playing in 31 games for the Ducks.

Vishnevsky established himself as a mainstay on the Duck defense, known for his punishing checks. In the 2002–03 season he helped the Ducks reach the Stanley Cup finals. Playing in all their playoff games in their eventual defeat to the New Jersey Devils. Vitaly scored a career high 16 points (6 goals and 10 assists) in the 2003–04 NHL season. Vishnevsky returned to Russia to play for Khimik Voskresensk during the 2004–05 NHL lockout.

In the 2005–06 NHL season, Vishnevsky continued to play for the Ducks where they made their way to the conference finals before losing to the Edmonton Oilers. On August 17, 2006 Vishnevsky was traded to the Atlanta Thrashers for Karl Stewart and a 2nd round pick prior to the 2006–07 NHL season.

Vitaly played in 52 games with the Thrashers before he was traded to the Nashville Predators for Éric Bélanger on February 10, 2007. Vishnevsky left the Predators at season's end and was signed as a free agent by the New Jersey Devils to a three-year contract on July 10, 2007. After one season of play, with the Devils, he was waived on August 22, 2008.

=== KHL ===
After Vishnevsky cleared waivers, he decided to go play in the newly formed KHL with Lokomotiv Yaroslavl on August 26, 2008. In his first season with Lokomotiv, the team made a run towards the Gagarin Cup but ultimately fell to Ak Bars Kazan in seven games. The following season, the team lost in the Conference Finals in seven games to HC MVD. After his contract expired, he signed with SKA Saint Petersburg. He then returned to Lokomotiv for another 2 years

After his contract expired once again, Vishnevskiy signed a professional tryout contract with the Anaheim Ducks, the team that had drafted him in 1998. Vishnevski was then released from his professional tryout after not appearing in a preseason game, thus making him a free agent.

After a two-year hiatus, Vishnevskiy opted to attempt a comeback to professional hockey in agreeing to a try-out with the Severstal Cherepovets on June 30, 2017. After participating in pre-season, Vishnevskiy impressed to secure a one-year deal with Severstal for the 2017–18 season on August 21, 2017. At the conclusion of the 2017-18 KHL season, Vishnevskiy retired once more.

== Career statistics ==
=== Regular season and playoffs ===
			Regular season					Playoffs
Season	Team	League	GP	G	A	Pts	PIM	GP	G	A	Pts	PIM
1995–96	Torpedo–2 Yaroslavl	RUS.3	40	4	4	8	20	—	—	—	—	—
1996–97	Torpedo–2 Yaroslavl	RUS.3	45	0	2	2	30	—	—	—	—	—
1997–98	Torpedo–2 Yaroslavl	RUS.2	47	8	9	17	164	—	—	—	—	—
1998–99	Torpedo Yaroslavl	RSL	34	3	4	7	38	10	0	0	0	4
1998–99	Torpedo–2 Yaroslavl	RUS.2	6	3	5	8	22	—	—	—	—	—
1999–2000	Cincinnati Mighty Ducks	AHL	35	1	3	4	45	—	—	—	—	—
1999–2000	Mighty Ducks of Anaheim	NHL	31	1	1	2	26	—	—	—	—	—
2000–01	Mighty Ducks of Anaheim	NHL	76	1	10	11	99	—	—	—	—	—
2001–02	Mighty Ducks of Anaheim	NHL	74	0	3	3	60	—	—	—	—	—
2002–03	Mighty Ducks of Anaheim	NHL	80	2	6	8	76	21	0	1	1	6
2003–04	Mighty Ducks of Anaheim	NHL	73	6	10	16	51	—	—	—	—	—
2004–05	Khimik Voskresensk	RSL	50	7	14	21	92	—	—	—	—	—
2005–06	Mighty Ducks of Anaheim	NHL	82	1	7	8	91	16	0	4	4	10
2006–07	Atlanta Thrashers	NHL	52	3	9	12	31	—	—	—	—	—
2006–07	Nashville Predators	NHL	15	0	1	1	10	—	—	—	—	—
2007–08	New Jersey Devils	NHL	69	2	5	7	50	3	0	0	0	2
2008–09	Lokomotiv Yaroslavl	KHL	53	8	13	21	124	19	2	7	9	44
2009–10	Lokomotiv Yaroslavl	KHL	55	5	14	19	68	17	0	9	9	32
2010–11	SKA Saint Petersburg	KHL	49	7	8	15	44	11	0	1	1	4
2011–12	SKA Saint Petersburg	KHL	54	3	4	7	89	14	0	1	1	9
2012–13	Lokomotiv Yaroslavl	KHL	52	2	5	7	36	6	0	0	0	2
2013–14	Lokomotiv Yaroslavl	KHL	52	1	4	5	22	18	1	0	1	2
2014–15	Lokomotiv Yaroslavl	KHL	43	0	3	3	16	1	0	0	0	0
2017–18	Severstal Cherepovets	KHL	51	1	5	6	26	4	0	0	0	0
NHL totals			552	16	52	68	494	40	0	5	5	18
KHL totals			409	27	56	83	425	90	3	18	21	93

=== International ===
Medal record

Representing Russia

Ice hockey

World Championships
Gold medal – first place	2009 Switzerland	

World Junior Championships
Gold medal – first place	1999 Winnipeg	
Silver medal – second place	1998 Helsinki	

Year	Team	Event	Result	GP	G	A	Pts	PIM
1997	Russia	EJC	4th	6	2	0	2	4
1998	Russia	WJC	2nd place, silver medalist(s)	7	1	2	3	6
1998	Russia	EJC	3rd place, bronze medalist(s)	6	2	6	8	24
1999	Russia	WJC	1st place, gold medalist(s)	7	0	2	2	6
1999	Russia	WC	5th	6	0	1	1	8
2001	Russia	WC	6th	7	0	3	3	6
2004	Russia	WCH	QF	3	0	0	0	0
2006	Russia	OG	4th	8	0	1	1	4
2009	Russia	WC	1st place, gold medalist(s)	9	0	0	0	29
Junior totals				14	1	4	5	12
Senior totals				33	0	5	5	47

Awards and achievements
Preceded by Michael Holmqvist	Anaheim Ducks first-round draft pick 1998	Succeeded by Alexei Smirnov
