= Lance Ward =

- Born: June 2, 1978 (age 48) Lloydminster, Alberta, Canada
- Height: 6 ft 3 in (191 cm)
- Weight: 214 lb (97 kg; 15 st 4 lb)
- Position: Defence
- Shot: Left
- Played for: Florida Panthers; Mighty Ducks of Anaheim; HV71 Jönköping; Frankfurt Lions
- NHL draft: 10th overall, 1996; New Jersey Devils; 63rd overall, 1998; Florida Panthers
- Playing career: 1998–2011

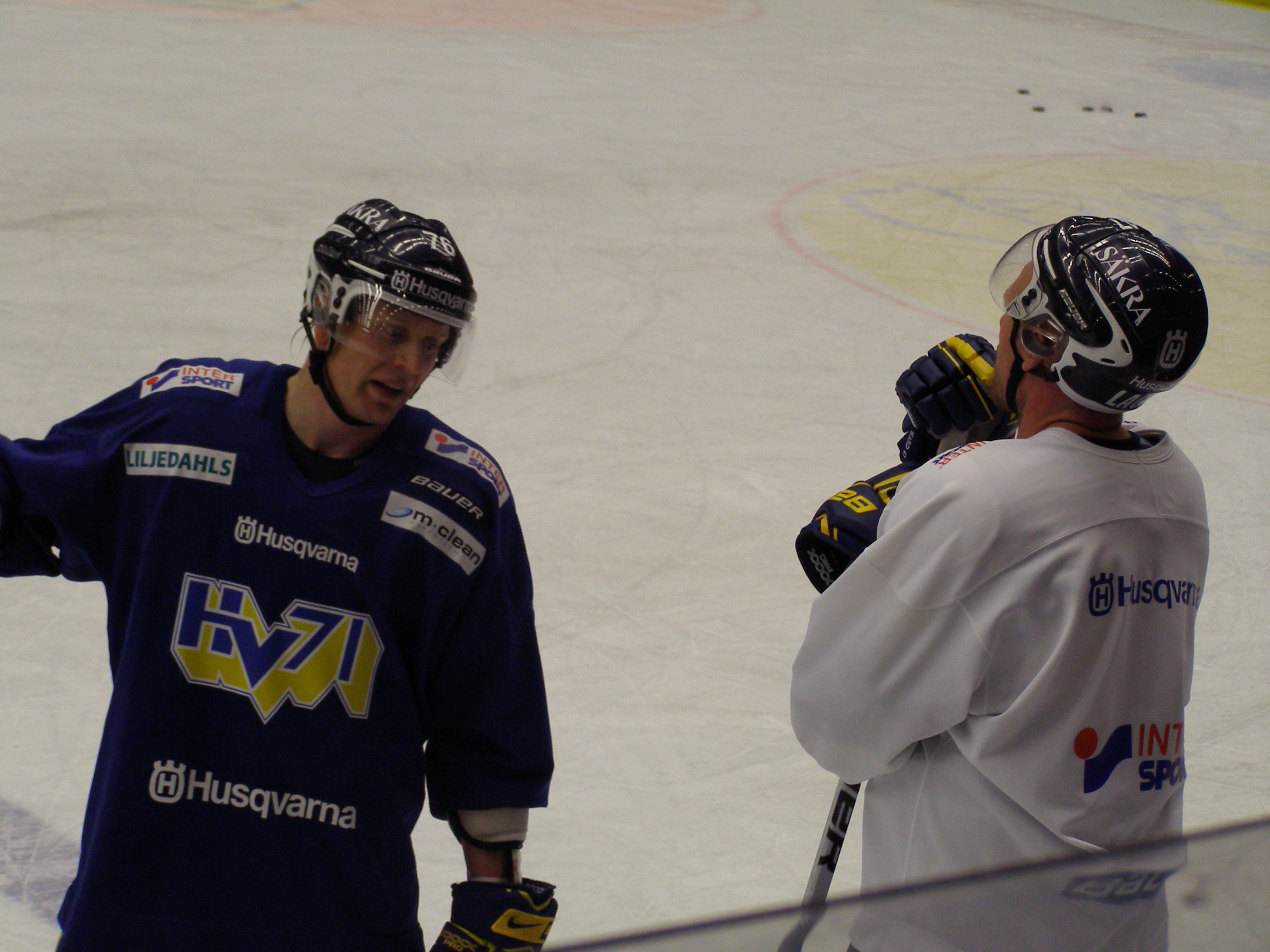
Johan Davidsson (left) and Lance Ward

Lance Ward (born June 2, 1978) is a Canadian former professional ice hockey defenceman. He holds the current Elitserien record for most penalty minutes during one season.

== Playing career ==
Born in Lloydminster, Alberta, Ward was originally drafted 10th overall by the New Jersey Devils in the 1996 NHL entry draft, but he re-entered the draft and was selected 63rd overall by the Florida Panthers in the 1998 NHL entry draft. Ward has played 209 career NHL games, scoring 4 goals and 12 assists for 16 points, and 391 penalty minutes. During the 2004–05 NHL lockout Ward did not play.

Ward signed a one-year contract on June 5, 2006, with the Swedish Elitserien club HV71 from Jönköping. On February 20, 2007, in a game against Färjestads BK, Ward broke both HV71's club record and the Elitserien record for most penalty minutes in one season when he checked one player into the boards and seconds later speared another in front of the crease. The sequence ended with Ward being penalized with 7 minutes plus game misconduct (adding another 20 minutes).

During the off-season 2007–08, Ward turned down a contract extension from HV71 to instead sign a two-year deal with the Austrian club Graz 99ers. In June, 2007, Graz revoked the contract and stated they will not pay Ward the amount settled in the signing. Ward returned to Sweden and re-signed with HV71 for another year.

After winning the Elitserien playoff finals with HV71 in 2008, Ward signed with the German DEL team Frankfurt Lions. After one season with Frankfurt, he signed a two-year contract to return to HV71 in 2009.

== Post career ==
Lance Ward was hired on as a full-time staff member within the Lloydminster public school hockey division in 2015. With Ward's new position, he has also been named the director of its hockey academy.

== Awards ==
- Swedish Champion with HV71 in 2008.
- Swedish Champion with HV71 in 2010.

== Records ==
- Elitserien record for penalty minutes (273) 2007
- Elitserien record for penalty minutes (212) 2008

== Career statistics ==
			Regular season					Playoffs
Season	Team	League	GP	G	A	Pts	PIM	GP	G	A	Pts	PIM
1993–94	Lloydminster Blazers	AJHL	20	8	12	20	68	—	—	—	—	—
1994–95	Red Deer Rebels	WHL	28	0	0	0	29	—	—	—	—	—
1995–96	Red Deer Rebels	WHL	72	4	13	17	127	10	0	4	4	10
1996–97	Red Deer Rebels	WHL	70	5	34	39	229	16	0	3	3	36
1997–98	Red Deer Rebels	WHL	71	8	25	33	233	5	0	0	0	16
1998–99	Fort Wayne Komets	IHL	13	0	2	2	28	—	—	—	—	—
1998–99	Beast of New Haven	AHL	43	2	5	7	51	—	—	—	—	—
1998–99	Miami Matadors	ECHL	6	1	0	1	12	—	—	—	—	—
1999–2000	Louisville Panthers	AHL	4	0	0	0	6	—	—	—	—	—
2000–01	Florida Panthers	NHL	30	0	2	2	45	—	—	—	—	—
2000–01	Louisville Panthers	AHL	35	3	2	5	78	—	—	—	—	—
2001–02	Florida Panthers	NHL	68	1	4	5	131	—	—	—	—	—
2002–03	Florida Panthers	NHL	36	3	1	4	78	—	—	—	—	—
2002–03	Mighty Ducks of Anaheim	NHL	29	0	1	1	43	—	—	—	—	—
2003–04	Mighty Ducks of Anaheim	NHL	46	0	4	4	94	—	—	—	—	—
2003–04	Cincinnati Mighty Ducks	AHL	5	0	1	1	6	—	—	—	—	—
2005–06	Binghamton Senators	AHL	80	3	20	23	278	—	—	—	—	—
2006–07	HV71	SEL	50	6	4	10	273	14	0	0	0	47
2007–08	HV71	SEL	52	0	7	7	212	16	0	0	0	66
2008–09	Frankfurt Lions	DEL	41	1	2	3	86	1	0	0	0	0
2009–10	HV71	SEL	30	0	3	3	73	9	0	0	0	10
2010–11	HV71	SEL	11	0	0	0	22	—	—	—	—	—
NHL totals			209	4	12	16	391	—	—	—	—	—
AHL totals			243	12	44	56	603	4	0	0	0	6
SEL totals			143	6	14	20	580	39	0	0	0	123

Preceded by Petr Sýkora	New Jersey Devils first-round draft pick 1996	Succeeded by Jean-François Damphousse
