= Cincinnati Mighty Ducks =

Ice hockey team based in Ohio, US

- City: Cincinnati, Ohio
- League: American Hockey League
- Operated: 1997–2005
- Home arena: Cincinnati Gardens
- Colors: Eggplant and Jade
- Affiliates: Detroit Red Wings; Mighty Ducks of Anaheim

Franchise history
- 1995–1997: Baltimore Bandits
- 1997–2005: Cincinnati Mighty Ducks
- 2007–present: Rockford IceHogs

The Cincinnati Mighty Ducks were a professional ice hockey team based in Cincinnati, Ohio. They were members of the American Hockey League, and played their home games at the Cincinnati Gardens. Throughout their existence they were the primary minor league affiliate of the Mighty Ducks of Anaheim of the National Hockey League, with a three-year shared affiliation with the Detroit Red Wings.

== History ==
In 1997, the Baltimore Bandits franchise was losing money and accruing debts in Baltimore. Jerry Robinson, owner of the Cincinnati Gardens arena, purchased the Bandits franchise to play at the Gardens, replacing the previous hockey tenant, the Cincinnati Cyclones of the International Hockey League. The Mighty Ducks of Anaheim signed Cincinnati to a five-year affiliate agreement. From 1999 through 2002 team shared its affiliation with the Detroit Red Wings, until the Red Wings affiliated with the Grand Rapids Griffins. Anaheim maintained their affiliation with Cincinnati through the 2004–05 season. The Cincinnati Mighty Ducks were granted a voluntary suspension for the 2005–06 season two days after Anaheim and Cincinnati ended their affiliation, and Cincinnati could not find a replacement NHL affiliate. In October 2005, the team was renamed the Cincinnati RailRaiders, and was seeking an affiliation agreement for a return in 2006–07 season, but failed to reach a goal of 2,000 season tickets sold to become re-active.

On October 3, 2006, it was reported that a Windsor, Ontario-based company had been granted conditional approval to purchase and relocate the team, however that deal fell through. On March 19, 2007, the AHL announced that the team had been purchased, and moved to Rockford, Illinois, to become the Rockford IceHogs.

The market was previously served by:

- Cincinnati Mohawks (1949–1952 AHL, 1952–1958 IHL)
- Cincinnati Wings (1963–1964 CHL)
- Cincinnati Swords (1971–1974 AHL)
- Cincinnati Stingers (1975–1979 WHA, 1979–1980 CHL)
- Cincinnati Tigers (1981–1982 CHL)
- Cincinnati Cyclones (1990–1992 ECHL, 1992–2001 IHL, 2001–2004 ECHL)

The team was replaced in this market by:

- Cincinnati Cyclones of the ECHL (2006–present)

Affiliates

- Mighty Ducks Of Anaheim (1997–2005)
- Detroit Red Wings (1999–2002)

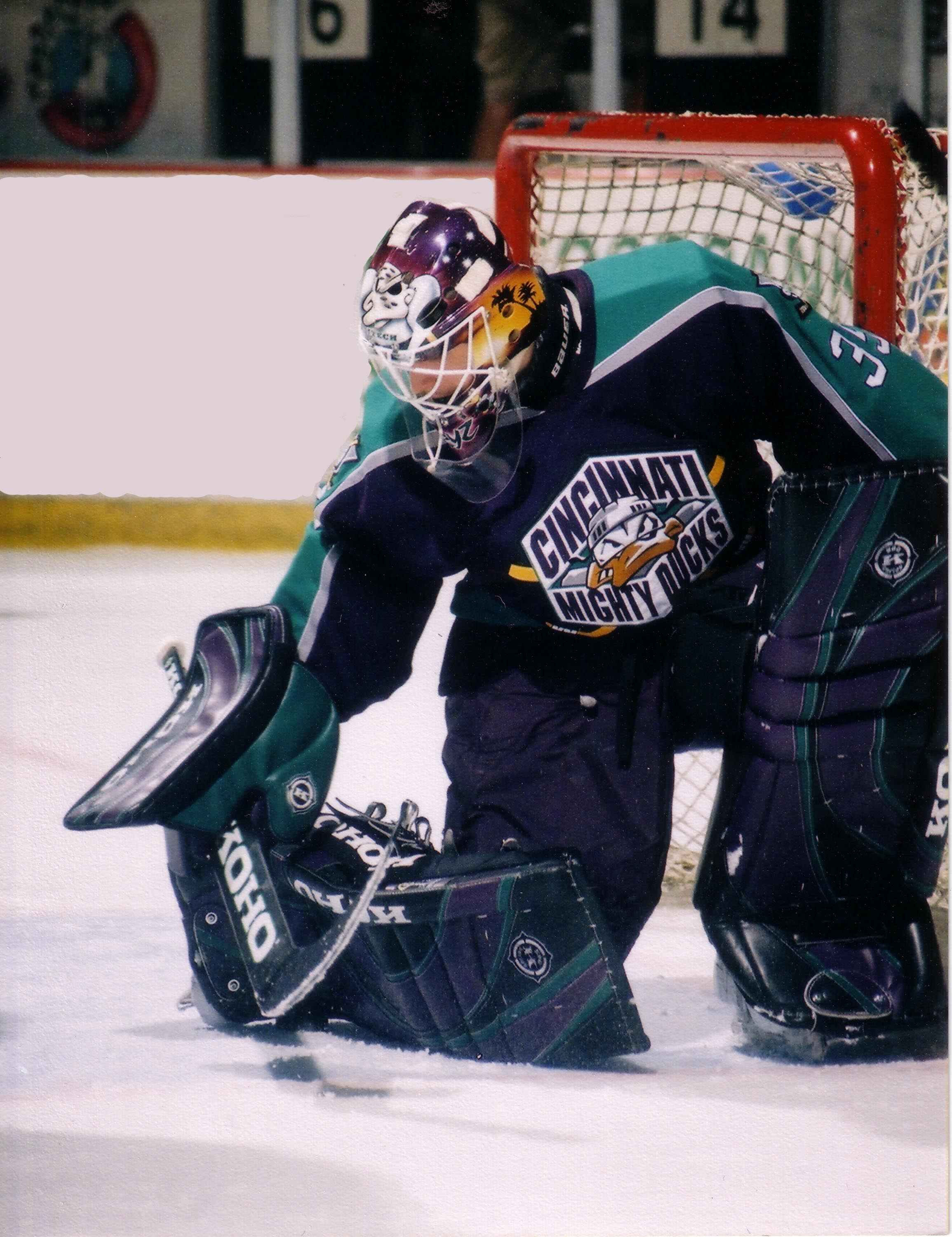
Ilya Bryzgalov

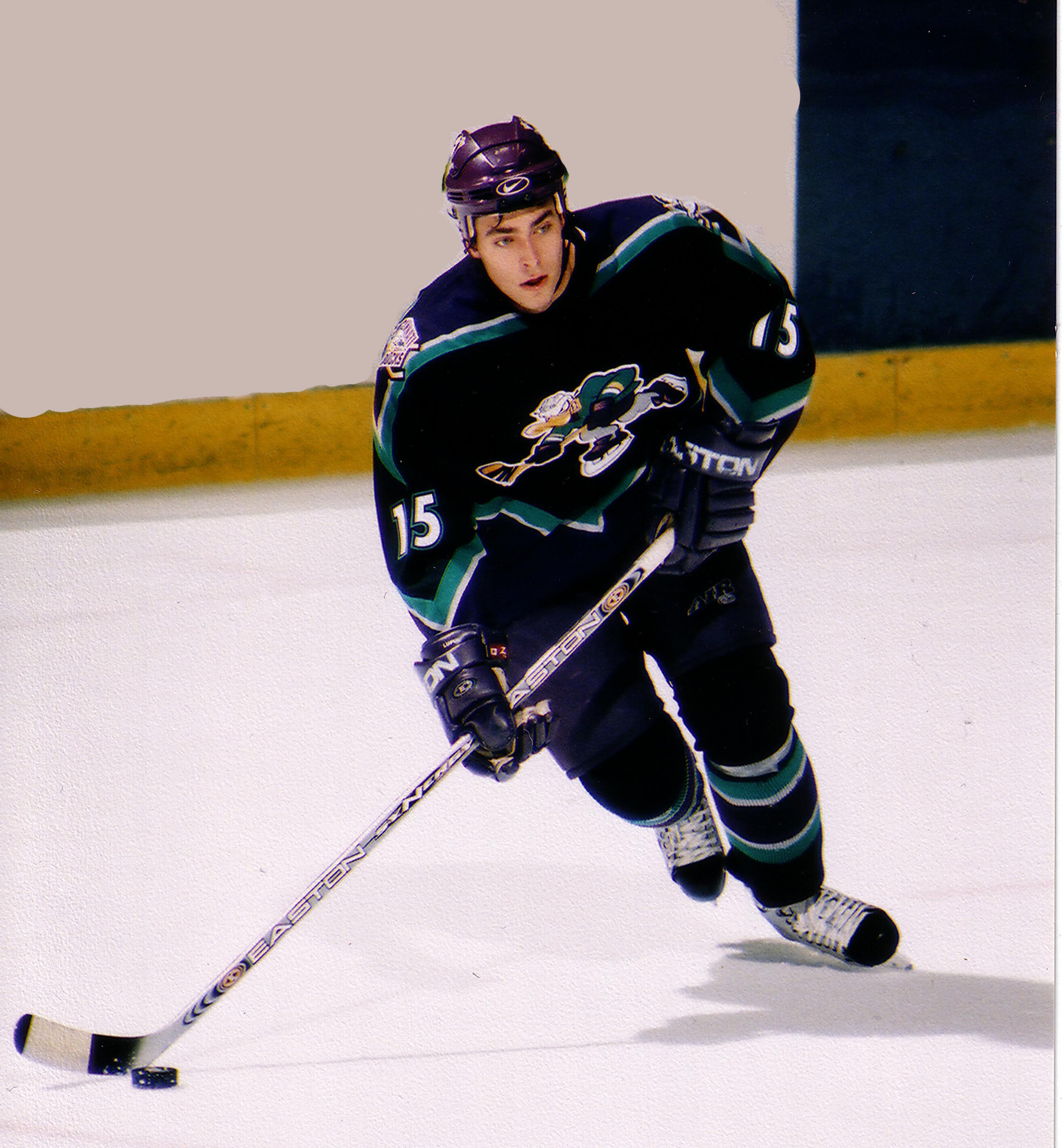
Joffrey Lupul wearing the alternate uniform of the Mighty Ducks

== Season-by-season results ==
=== Regular season ===
| Season | Games | Won | Lost | Tied | OTL | SOL | Points | Goals for | Goals against | Standing |
|---|---|---|---|---|---|---|---|---|---|---|
| 1997–98 | 80 | 23 | 37 | 13 | 7 | — | 66 | 243 | 303 | 4th, Mid-Atlantic |
| 1998–99 | 80 | 35 | 39 | 4 | 2 | — | 76 | 227 | 249 | 4th, Mid-Atlantic |
| 1999–00 | 80 | 30 | 37 | 9 | 4 | — | 73 | 227 | 244 | 5th, Mid-Atlantic |
| 2000–01 | 80 | 41 | 26 | 9 | 4 | — | 95 | 254 | 240 | 2nd, South |
| 2001–02 | 80 | 33 | 33 | 11 | 3 | — | 80 | 216 | 211 | 3rd, Central |
| 2002–03 | 80 | 26 | 35 | 13 | 6 | — | 71 | 202 | 242 | 3rd, Central |
| 2003–04 | 80 | 29 | 37 | 13 | 1 | — | 72 | 188 | 211 | 5th, West |
| 2004–05 | 80 | 44 | 31 | — | 4 | 1 | 93 | 206 | 191 | 3rd, West |

=== Playoffs ===
| Season | Preliminary | 1st round | 2nd round | 3rd round | Finals |
|---|---|---|---|---|---|
| 1997–98 | Out of Playoffs | | | | |
| 1998–99 | — | L, 0–3, Philadelphia | — | — | — |
| 1999–00 | Out of Playoffs | | | | |
| 2000–01 | — | L, 1–3, Norfolk | — | — | — |
| 2001–02 | L, 1–2, Chicago | — | — | — | — |
| 2002–03 | Out of Playoffs | | | | |
| 2003–04 | W, 2–0, Houston | L, 3–4, Milwaukee | — | — | — |
| 2004–05 | — | W, 4–3, Milwaukee | L, 1–4, Chicago | — | — |

== Notable players and coaches ==
Numerous Cincinnati Mighty Ducks alumni won the Stanley Cup with the Anaheim Ducks in 2007 and Detroit Red Wings in 2008. In addition, former Cincinnati coach Mike Babcock led Anaheim to a Stanley Cup Finals appearance in 2003 before coaching Detroit's championship-winning team in 2008.

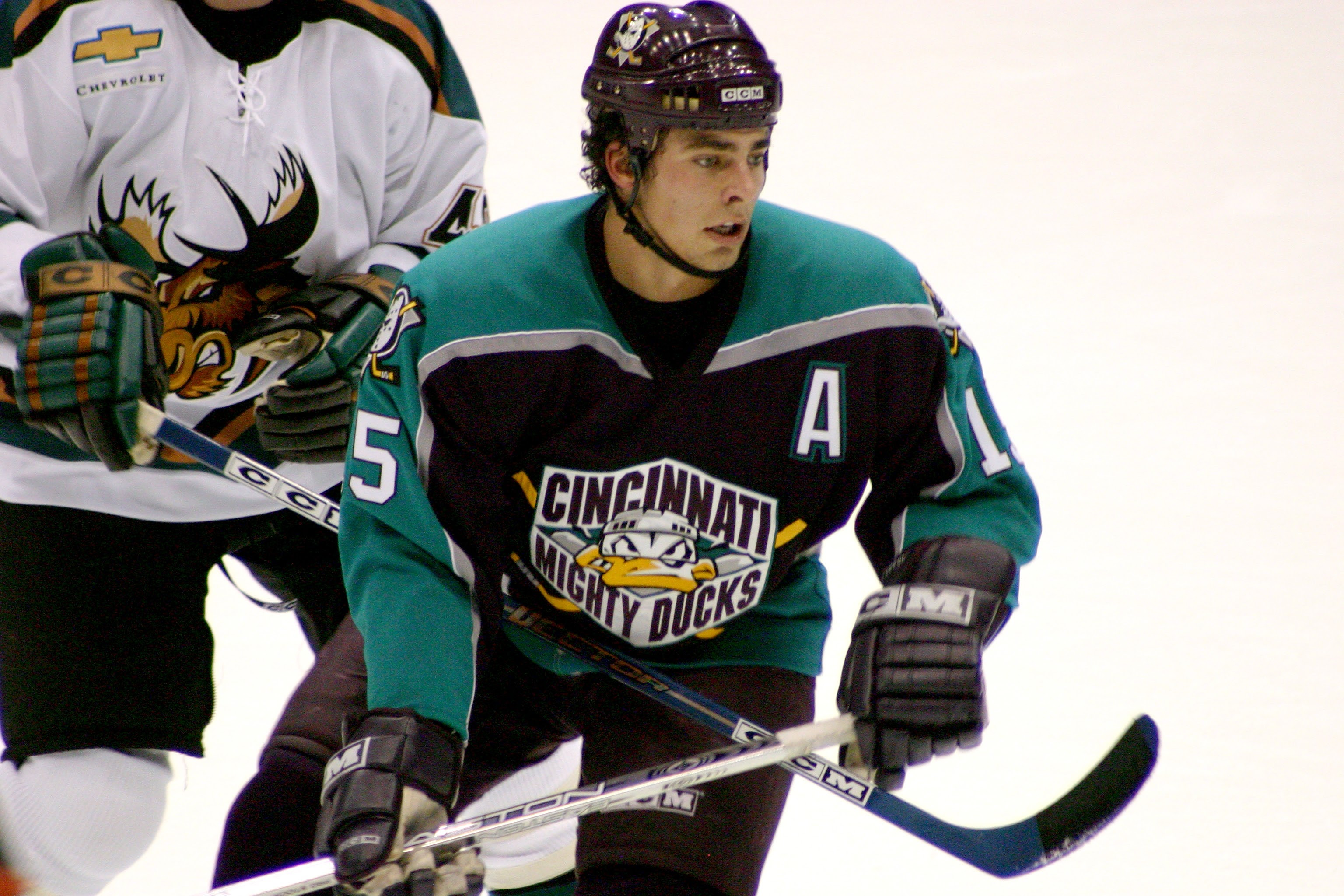
Joffrey Lupul playing for the Cincinnati Mighty Ducks in 2004.

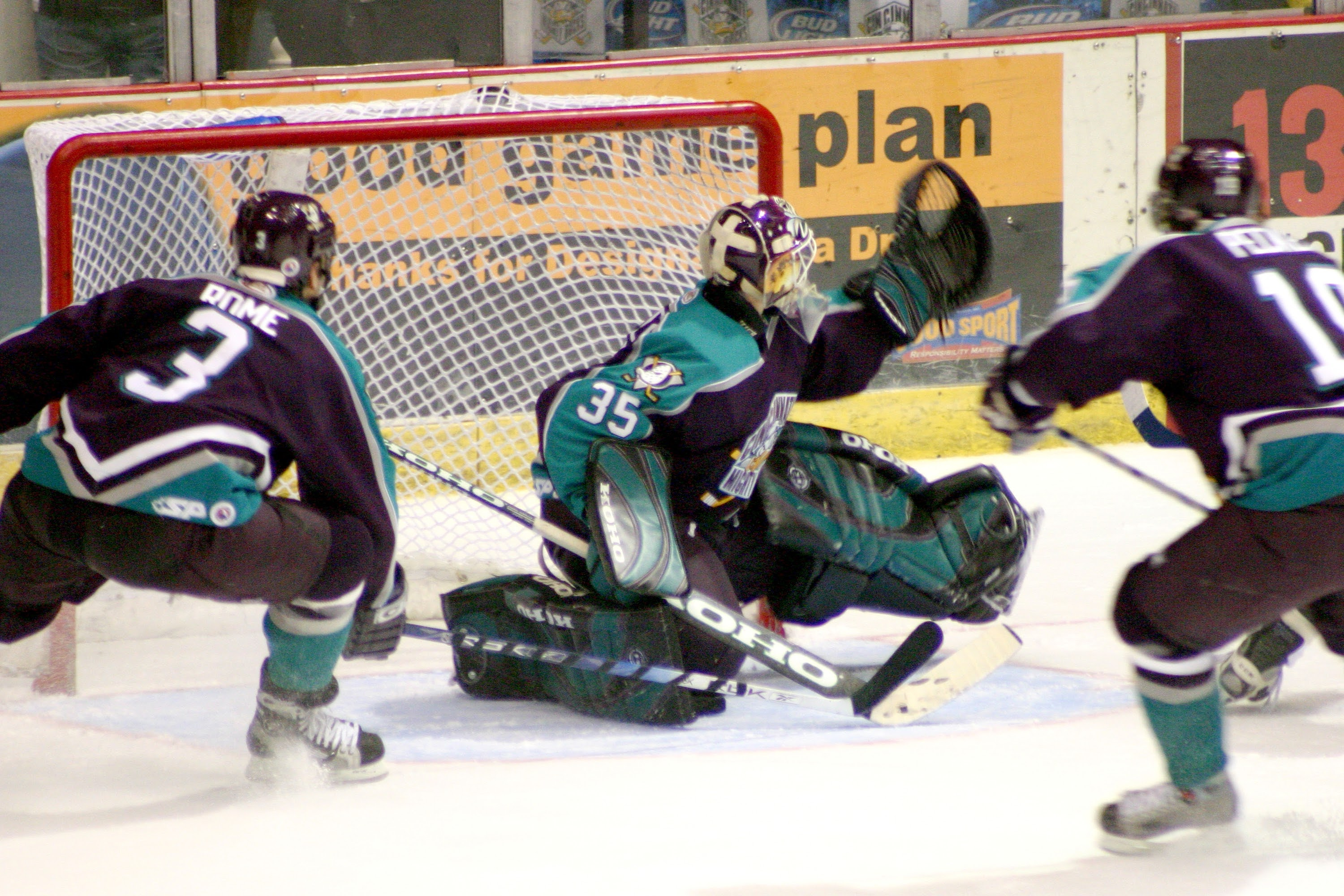
Ilya Bryzgalov playing for the Cincinnati Mighty Ducks in 2004.

=== List ===
- Sean Avery
- Mike Babcock
- Tim Brent
- Sheldon Brookbank
- Ilya Bryzgalov
- Dan Bylsma
- Marc Chouinard
- Mike Commodore
- Matt Cullen
- Kurtis Foster
- Ryan Getzlaf
- Jean-Sebastien Giguere
- Curtis Glencross
- Zenon Konopka
- Tomas Kopecky
- Chris Kunitz
- Maxim Kuznetsov
- Joffrey Lupul
- Tony Martensson
- Andy McDonald
- Shane O'Brien
- Samuel Pahlsson
- Pierre-Alexandr Parenteau
- Richard Park
- Dustin Penner
- Corey Perry
- Ruslan Salei
- Bob Wren
- Chris Mason

=== American Hockey League Hall of Famers ===
AHL Hall of Fame Honored Members
| Name | Seasons | Induction Year |
|---|---|---|
| Keith Aucoin | 2003-04 (player) | 2022 |
| Frederic Cassivi | 2004-05 (player) | 2015 |

== Team records ==
=== Single season ===
Goals: 42 (Canada) Bob Wren (1997–98)
Assists: 59 (Canada) Craig Reichert (1997–98)
Points: 100 Bob Wren (1997–98)
Penalty minutes: 319 (Canada) Shane O'Brien (2004–05)
GAA: 2.07 (Canada) Frederic Cassivi (2004–05)
SV%: .924 Frederic Cassivi (2004–05)

=== Career ===
Career goals: 113 Bob Wren
Career assists: 186 Bob Wren
Career points: 299 Bob Wren
Career penalty minutes: 482 Shane O'Brien
Career goaltending wins: 76 (Russia) Ilya Bryzgalov
Career shutouts: 19 Ilya Bryzgalov
Career games: 277 Bob Wren
