= 2002–03 Calgary Flames season =

NHL team season

2002–03 Calgary Flames
- Division: 5th Northwest
- Conference: 12th Western
- 2002–03 record: 29–36–13–4
- Home record: 14–16–10–1
- Road record: 15–20–3–3
- Goals for: 186
- Goals against: 228

Team information
- General manager: Craig Button
- Coach: Greg Gilbert (Oct.–Dec.); Al MacNeil (Dec. 3-23); Darryl Sutter (Dec.–Apr.)
- Captain: Craig Conroy
- Alternate captains: Bob Boughner; Jarome Iginla
- Arena: Pengrowth Saddledome
- Average attendance: 16,239
- Minor league affiliates: Saint John Flames; Johnstown Chiefs

Team leaders
- Goals: Jarome Iginla (35)
- Assists: Craig Conroy (37)
- Points: Jarome Iginla (67)
- Penalty minutes: Scott Nichol (149)
- Plus/minus: Bob Boughner (+5); Denis Gauthier (+5); Oleg Saprykin (+5)
- Wins: Roman Turek (27)
- Goals against average: Roman Turek (2.57)

The 2002–03 Calgary Flames season was the 23rd National Hockey League season in Calgary. A relatively successful start to the season quickly gave way to disaster as the Flames lost 11 of 12 games in a November stretch dropping the Flames out of contention, ultimately failing to qualify for the playoffs for the seventh consecutive season.

The season began as the last had ended: with forward Marc Savard and head coach Greg Gilbert in bitter, public feud. After arguing in the media for nearly a year, the Flames finally granted the disgruntled players request, trading Savard to the Atlanta Thrashers. Gilbert himself would not last much longer with the Flames, as he would be fired by the club barely two weeks after Savard was dealt.

The Flames would quickly find a replacement for Gilbert, announcing they had hired Darryl Sutter shortly before the new year. Sutter immediately began shaping the Flames to his own style, and the Flames finished 19–16–8–1 under their new bench boss.

Following the season, the Flames announced that they would not renew General Manager Craig Button's contract. Sutter took over as GM, carrying the dual roles until the end of the 2005–06 season.

Flames mascot, Harvey the Hound, gained widespread publicity in January 2003 following an incident with Edmonton Oilers head coach, Craig MacTavish. With the Flames leading 4–0, Harvey was taunting the Oilers behind their bench. The frustrated coach reached up and ripped Harvey's signature red tongue out of his mouth, tossing it into the crowd. The incident would seem to spark the Oilers, who scored three goals shortly after. The Flames would hold on to win 4–3, however. The incident made headlines throughout North America, and led to many jokes, including having many other NHL team mascots arrive at the 2003 All-Star Game with their tongues hanging out.

== Regular season ==
The Flames struggled offensively and were shut out a league-high 10 times, tied with the Minnesota Wild, Nashville Predators and Pittsburgh Penguins.

Calgary finished 12th in the Western Conference, 17 points behind the 8th place Edmonton Oilers.

=== Final standings ===
Northwest Division
No.	CR		GP	W	L	T	OTL	GF	GA	Pts
1	3	**Colorado Avalanche**	82	42	19	13	8	251	194	105
2	4	**Vancouver Canucks**	82	45	23	13	1	264	208	104
3	6	**Minnesota Wild**	82	42	29	10	1	198	178	95
4	8	**Edmonton Oilers**	82	36	26	11	9	231	230	92
5	12	Calgary Flames	82	29	36	13	4	186	228	75

Note: CR = Conference rank; GP = Games played; W = Wins; L = Losses; T = Ties; OTL = Overtime loss; GF = Goals for; GA = Goals against; Pts = Points
Bolded teams qualified for the playoffs.

Western Conference
R		Div	GP	W	L	T	OTL	GF	GA	Pts
**1**	**Z-** Dallas Stars	**PA**	**82**	**46**	**17**	**15**	**4**	**245**	**169**	111
**2**	**Y-** Detroit Red Wings	**CE**	**82**	**48**	**20**	**10**	**4**	**269**	**203**	110
**3**	**Y-** Colorado Avalanche	**NW**	**82**	**42**	**19**	**13**	**8**	**251**	**194**	105
**4**	**X-** Vancouver Canucks	**NW**	**82**	**45**	**23**	**13**	**1**	**264**	**208**	104
**5**	**X-** St. Louis Blues	**CE**	**82**	**41**	**24**	**11**	**6**	**253**	**222**	99
**6**	**X-** Minnesota Wild	**NW**	**82**	**42**	**29**	**10**	**1**	**198**	**178**	95
**7**	**X-** Mighty Ducks of Anaheim	**PA**	**82**	**40**	**27**	**9**	**6**	**203**	**193**	95
**8**	**X-** Edmonton Oilers	**NW**	**82**	**36**	**26**	**11**	**9**	**231**	**230**	92
8.5
9	Chicago Blackhawks	CE	82	30	33	13	6	207	226	79
10	Los Angeles Kings	PA	82	33	37	6	6	203	221	78
11	Phoenix Coyotes	PA	82	31	35	11	5	204	230	78
12	Calgary Flames	NW	82	29	36	13	4	186	228	75
13	Nashville Predators	CE	82	27	35	13	7	183	206	74
14	San Jose Sharks	PA	82	28	37	9	8	214	239	73
15	Columbus Blue Jackets	CE	82	29	42	8	3	213	263	69

Divisions: PA – Pacific, CE – Central, NW – Northwest

Z – Clinched conference; Y – Clinched division; X – Clinched playoff spot

== Schedule and results ==
2002–03 regular season
October: 3–3–2–2 (home: 1–2–2–1; road: 2–1–0–1)

Game	Date	Visitor	Score	Home	OT	Decision	Attendance	Record	Pts	Recap
1	October 10	Vancouver	3 – 0	Calgary		Turek	17,409	0–1–0–0	0	L
2	October 12	Philadelphia	5 – 4	Calgary		Turek	16,750	0–2–0–0	0	L
3	October 14	Calgary	3 – 2	Vancouver		Turek	18,016	1–2–0–0	2	W
4	October 17	Boston	3 – 3	Calgary	OT	Turek	15,346	1–2–1–0	3	T
5	October 19	Calgary	5 – 2	Chicago		Turek	14,034	2–2–1–0	5	W
6	October 21	Calgary	0 – 4	Detroit		McLennan	20,058	2–3–1–0	5	L
7	October 22	Calgary	3 – 4	Minnesota	OT	Turek	18,064	2–3–1–1	6	OTL
8	October 24	Dallas	3 – 3	Calgary	OT	Turek	14,625	2–3–2–1	7	T
9	October 26	St. Louis	4 – 3	Calgary	OT	Turek	14,538	2–3–2–2	8	OTL
10	October 31	Buffalo	0 – 3	Calgary		Turek	14,822	3–3–2–2	10	W

November: 3–9–1–1 (home: 1–4–1–0; road: 2–5–0–1)

Game	Date	Visitor	Score	Home	OT	Decision	Attendance	Record	Pts	Recap
11	November 2	Colorado	4 – 4	Calgary	OT	McLennan	17,448	3–3–3–2	11	T
12	November 4	Calgary	4 – 2	NY Islanders		McLennan	12,316	4–3–3–2	13	W
13	November 5	Calgary	3 – 2	New Jersey		McLennan	12,315	5–3–3–2	15	W
14	November 7	Calgary	0 – 1	NY Rangers	OT	McLennan	18,200	5–3–3–3	16	OTL
15	November 9	Calgary	0 – 3	Florida		McLennan	14,794	5–4–3–3	16	L
16	November 11	Calgary	1 – 2	Atlanta		McLennan	10,501	5–5–3–3	16	L
17	November 14	NY Rangers	2 – 1	Calgary		McLennan	16,386	5–6–3–3	16	L
18	November 16	St. Louis	1 – 0	Calgary		McLennan	15,505	5–7–3–3	16	L
19	November 19	Detroit	5 – 0	Calgary		McLennan	10,061	5–8–3–3	16	L
20	November 21	Edmonton	3 – 1	Calgary		McLennan	17,660	5–9–3–3	16	L
21	November 23	Chicago	1 – 3	Calgary		Turek	15,826	6–9–3–3	18	W
22	November 26	Calgary	2 – 7	Boston		Turek	13,582	6–10–3–3	18	L
23	November 27	Calgary	2 – 4	Washington		Turek	13,532	6–11–3–3	18	L
24	November 29	Calgary	2 – 7	St. Louis		Turek	19,326	6–12–3–3	18	L

December: 5–6–3–0 (home: 1–3–2–0; road: 4–3–1–0)

Game	Date	Visitor	Score	Home	OT	Decision	Attendance	Record	Pts	Recap
25	December 1	Calgary	2 – 4	Detroit		Turek	20,058	6–13–3–3	18	L
26	December 3	Calgary	2 – 1	Colorado		Turek	18,007	7–13–3–3	20	W
27	December 5	Minnesota	1 – 1	Calgary	OT	Turek	14,118	7–13–4–3	21	T
28	December 9	Calgary	2 – 1	Vancouver		Turek	18,422	8–13–4–3	23	W
29	December 12	Carolina	4 – 3	Calgary		Turek	14,528	8–14–4–3	23	L
30	December 14	Colorado	3 – 1	Calgary		Turek	17,192	8–15–4–3	23	L
31	December 15	Calgary	3 – 3	Vancouver	OT	Turek	18,422	8–15–5–3	24	T
32	December 17	Calgary	3 – 0	Nashville		Turek	10,216	9–15–5–3	26	W
33	December 19	Calgary	0 – 3	Columbus		Turek	17,230	9–16–5–3	26	L
34	December 21	Calgary	0 – 2	Pittsburgh		Turek	12,571	9–17–5–3	26	L
35	December 23	Calgary	3 – 2	Minnesota		Turek	18,568	10–17–5–3	28	W
36	December 27	Toronto	4 – 3	Calgary		Turek	18,014	10–18–5–3	28	L
37	December 29	Anaheim	2 – 4	Calgary		Turek	16,922	11–18–5–3	30	W
38	December 31	Montreal	1 – 1	Calgary	OT	Turek	18,159	11–18–6–3	31	T

January: 6–7–1–0 (home: 5–3–1–0; road: 1–4–0–0)

Game	Date	Visitor	Score	Home	OT	Decision	Attendance	Record	Pts	Recap
39	January 2	Tampa Bay	1 – 4	Calgary		Turek	14,881	12–18–6–3	33	W
40	January 4	Minnesota	2 – 3	Calgary		Turek	15,974	13–18–6–3	35	W
41	January 7	Calgary	4 – 2	Colorado		Turek	18,007	14–18–6–3	37	W
42	January 9	Ottawa	1 – 0	Calgary		Turek	16,058	14–19–6–3	37	L
43	January 11	Columbus	7 – 2	Calgary		Turek	14,827	14–20–6–3	37	L
44	January 13	Calgary	2 – 4	Montreal		Turek	20,630	14–21–6–3	37	L
45	January 14	Calgary	2 – 3	Toronto		Turek	19,290	14–22–6–3	37	L
46	January 16	Nashville	2 – 2	Calgary	OT	McLennan	14,621	14–22–7–3	38	T
47	January 18	Los Angeles	1 – 2	Calgary	OT	Turek	16,675	15–22–7–3	40	W
48	January 20	Edmonton	3 – 4	Calgary		Turek	17,832	16–22–7–3	42	W
49	January 23	Phoenix	7 – 1	Calgary		Turek	14,865	16–23–7–3	42	L
50	January 25	Detroit	1 – 4	Calgary		Turek	18,028	17–23–7–3	44	W
51	January 28	Calgary	3 – 4	Phoenix		Turek	14,619	17–24–7–3	44	L
52	January 29	Calgary	1 – 4	Dallas		Turek	18,532	17–25–7–3	44	L

February: 2–6–3–1 (home: 0–1–2–0; road: 2–5–1–1)

Game	Date	Visitor	Score	Home	OT	Decision	Attendance	Record	Pts	Recap
53	February 4	Anaheim	3 – 2	Calgary		Turek	14,110	17–26–7–3	44	L
54	February 6	Chicago	2 – 2	Calgary	OT	McLennan	16,027	17–26–8–3	45	T
55	February 7	Calgary	4 – 3	Edmonton		Turek	16,839	18–26–8–3	47	W
56	February 9	Calgary	2 – 4	Colorado		Turek	18,007	18–27–8–3	47	L
57	February 12	Calgary	3 – 4	Anaheim	OT	McLennan	11,612	18–27–8–4	48	OTL
58	February 13	Calgary	2 – 4	Los Angeles		Turek	17,539	18–28–8–4	48	L
59	February 15	Vancouver	2 – 2	Calgary	OT	Turek	18,252	18–28–9–4	49	T
60	February 17	Calgary	3 – 5	St. Louis		Turek	19,522	18–29–9–4	49	L
61	February 19	Calgary	1 – 1	Dallas	OT	Turek	18,532	18–29–10–4	50	T
62	February 20	Calgary	1 – 4	Nashville		McLennan	10,842	18–30–10–4	50	L
63	February 23	Calgary	4 – 2	Phoenix		Turek	14,241	19–30–10–4	52	W
64	February 24	Calgary	2 – 5	San Jose		Turek	17,311	19–31–10–4	52	L

March: 8–5–2–0 (home: 5–3–1–0; road: 3–2–1–0)

Game	Date	Visitor	Score	Home	OT	Decision	Attendance	Record	Pts	Recap
65	March 1	San Jose	3 – 4	Calgary		Turek	17,575	20–31–10–4	54	W
66	March 5	New Jersey	4 – 5	Calgary	OT	Turek	16,106	21–31–10–4	56	W
67	March 7	Calgary	2 – 0	Chicago		Turek	14,702	22–31–10–4	58	W
68	March 8	Calgary	3 – 2	Columbus	OT	Turek	18,136	23–31–10–4	60	W
69	March 11	Edmonton	5 – 2	Calgary		Turek	17,714	23–32–10–4	60	L
70	March 13	Toronto	3 – 4	Calgary	OT	Turek	18,064	24–32–10–4	62	W
71	March 15	Calgary	2 – 3	San Jose		Turek	17,496	24–33–10–4	62	L
72	March 16	Calgary	2 – 2	Anaheim	OT	McLennan	16,726	24–33–11–4	63	T
73	March 18	Calgary	4 – 1	Los Angeles		Turek	17,470	25–33–11–4	65	W
74	March 20	Washington	4 – 1	Calgary		Turek	15,827	25–34–11–4	65	L
75	March 22	Nashville	1 – 1	Calgary	OT	Turek	16,628	25–34–12–4	66	T
76	March 24	Phoenix	0 – 2	Calgary		Turek	16,685	26–34–12–4	68	W
77	March 27	Dallas	1 – 2	Calgary	OT	Turek	16,533	27–34–12–4	70	W
78	March 29	Columbus	6 – 4	Calgary		Turek	16,007	27–35–12–4	70	L
79	March 31	Calgary	0 – 3	Minnesota		McLennan	18,568	27–36–12–4	70	L

April: 2–0–1–0 (home: 1–0–1–0; road: 1–0–0–0)

Game	Date	Visitor	Score	Home	OT	Decision	Attendance	Record	Pts	Recap
80	April 2	San Jose	2 – 2	Calgary	OT	Turek	14,207	27–36–13–4	71	T
81	April 4	Los Angeles	1 – 2	Calgary	OT	Turek	17,003	28–36–13–4	73	W
82	April 5	Calgary	4 – 1	Edmonton		Turek	16,839	29–36–13–4	75	W

Legend: W Win (2 points) L Loss (0 points) T Tie (1 point) OTL Overtime loss (1 point)

== Player statistics ==
=== Scoring ===
- Position abbreviations: C = Centre; D = Defence; G = Goaltender; LW = Left wing; RW = Right wing
- † = Joined team via a transaction (e.g., trade, waivers, signing) during the season. Stats reflect time with the Flames only.
- ‡ = Left team via a transaction (e.g., trade, waivers, release) during the season. Stats reflect time with the Flames only.

No.	Player	Pos	Regular season					
No.	Player	Pos	GP	G	A	Pts	+/-	PIM
12	Jarome Iginla	RW	75	35	32	67	−10	49
22	Craig Conroy	C	79	22	37	59	−4	36
18 (Note: Drury wore number 37 through March 11.)	Chris Drury	LW	80	23	30	53	−9	33
23	Martin Gelinas	LW	81	21	31	52	−3	51
32	Toni Lydman	D	81	6	20	26	−7	28
11	Stephane Yelle	C	82	10	15	25	−10	50
19	Oleg Saprykin	LW	52	8	15	23	5	46
17	Chris Clark	RW	81	10	12	22	−11	126
10	Dave Lowry	LW	34	5	14	19	4	22
44	Rob Niedermayer‡	LW	54	8	10	18	−13	42
6	Bob Boughner	D	69	3	14	17	5	126
4	Jordan Leopold	D	58	4	10	14	−15	12
3	Denis Gauthier	D	72	1	11	12	5	99
28	Robyn Regehr	D	76	0	12	12	−9	87
40	Scott Nichol	C	68	5	5	10	−7	149
24	Blake Sloan	RW	67	2	8	10	−5	28
20	Mathias Johansson‡	C	46	4	5	9	−15	12
8	Petr Buzek	D	44	3	5	8	−6	14
7	Chuck Kobasew	RW	23	4	2	6	−3	8
27 (Note: Berube wore number 16 in his first 14 games.)	Craig Berube	LW	55	2	4	6	−6	100
26	Steve Begin	C	50	3	1	4	−7	51
18	Jamie Wright‡	LW	19	2	2	4	1	12
15	Blair Betts	C	9	1	3	4	3	0
21	Andrew Ference†	D	16	0	4	4	1	6
1	Roman Turek	G	65	0	4	4		14
16	Shean Donovan†	RW	13	1	2	3	−2	7
42	Micki DuPont‡	D	16	1	2	3	−5	4
27	Marc Savard‡	C	10	1	2	3	−3	8
5	Steve Montador	D	50	1	1	2	−9	114
2	Mike Commodore†	D	6	0	1	1	2	19
43	Ladislav Kohn	RW	3	0	1	1	1	2
33	Jamie McLennan	G	22	0	0	0		14
36	Mike Mottau†	D	4	0	0	0	−1	0
51	Rick Mrozik	D	2	0	0	0	0	0
38	Robert Dome	RW	1	0	0	0	0	0

=== Goaltending ===
No.	Player	Regular season									
No.	Player	GP	W	L	T	SA	GA	GAA	SV%	SO	TOI
1	Roman Turek	65	27	29	9	1679	164	2.54	.902	4	3822
33	Jamie McLennan	22	2	11	4	537	58	2.99	.892	0	1165

== Awards and records ==
=== Awards ===
Type	Award/honour	Recipient	Ref
League (in-season)	NHL All-Star Game selection	Jarome Iginla	
League (in-season)	NHL YoungStars Game selection	Jordan Leopold	
Team	Molson Cup	Jarome Iginla	
Team	Ralph T. Scurfield Humanitarian Award	Denis Gauthier	

=== Milestones ===
Milestone	Player	Date	Ref
First game	Chuck Kobasew	October 10, 2002	
First game	Mathias Johansson	October 12, 2002	
First game	Jordan Leopold	October 19, 2002	
First game	Rick Mrozik	April 4, 2003	
1,000th game played	Craig Berube	October 12, 2002	

== Transactions ==
The Flames were involved in the following transactions from June 14, 2002, the day after the deciding game of the 2002 Stanley Cup Finals, through June 9, 2003, the day of the deciding game of the 2003 Stanley Cup Finals.

=== Trades ===
Date	Details		Ref
June 22, 2002	To Calgary Flames: NY Rangers’ 1st-round pick in 2002; 4th-round pick in 2002	To Florida Panthers: 1st-round pick in 2002	
June 22, 2002	To Calgary Flames: 3rd-round pick in 2002; 5th-round pick in 2002	To Toronto Maple Leafs: 3rd-round pick in 2002	
June 22, 2002	To Calgary Flames: Jamie McLennan	To Minnesota Wild: 9th-round pick in 2002	
June 23, 2002	To Calgary Flames: 4th-round pick in 2002; Minnesota’s 5th-round pick in 2002	To Montreal Canadiens: Florida’s 4th-round pick in 2002	
June 30, 2002	To Calgary Flames: Rights to Curtis Joseph	To Toronto Maple Leafs: Conditional 8th-round pick in 2003	
September 11, 2002	To Calgary Flames: Ladislav Kohn	To Detroit Red Wings: Future considerations	
October 1, 2002	To Calgary Flames: Chris Drury; Stephane Yelle	To Colorado Avalanche: Dean McAmmond; Derek Morris; Jeff Shantz	
November 15, 2002	To Calgary Flames: Rights to Ruslan Zainullin	To Atlanta Thrashers: Marc Savard	
January 22, 2003	To Calgary Flames: Future considerations	To Philadelphia Flyers: Jamie Wright	
January 22, 2003	To Calgary Flames: Mike Mottau	To New York Rangers: 6th-round pick in 2003 or 2004	
February 10, 2003	To Calgary Flames: Andrew Ference	To Pittsburgh Penguins: Conditional draft pick in 2003 or 2004	
March 11, 2003	To Calgary Flames: Mike Commodore; Jean-Francois Damphousse	To Anaheim Mighty Ducks: Rob Niedermayer	
March 11, 2003	To Calgary Flames: Dean McAmmond	To Colorado Avalanche: 5th-round pick in 2003 or 2004	
March 11, 2003	To Calgary Flames: Shean Donovan	To Pittsburgh Penguins: Micki DuPont; Mathias Johansson	

=== Players acquired ===
Date	Player	Former team	Term	Via	Ref
July 2, 2002	Martin Gelinas	Carolina Hurricanes		Free agency	
July 9, 2002	Martin Sonnenberg	Pittsburgh Penguins		Free agency	
July 9, 2002	Darcy Verot	Pittsburgh Penguins		Free agency	
July 11, 2002	Mike Martin	Saint John Flames (AHL)		Free agency	
July 11, 2002	Jason Morgan	Saint John Flames (AHL)		Free agency	
July 17, 2002	Robert Dome	Pittsburgh Penguins		Free agency	
September 9, 2002	Jan Vodrazka	Lowell Lock Monsters (AHL)		Free agency	
September 27, 2002	Darren Lynch	Vancouver Giants (WHL)		Free agency	

=== Players lost ===
Date	Player	New team	Via (Note: In parentheses is the player's free agency group on July 1 if applicable.)	Ref
July 2, 2002	Curtis Joseph	Detroit Red Wings	Free agency (III)	
July 11, 2002	Clarke Wilm	Nashville Predators	Free agency (UFA)	
July 18, 2002	Alan Letang	New York Islanders	Free agency (VI)	
July 23, 2002	Dallas Eakins	Atlanta Thrashers	Free agency (UFA)	
August 1, 2002	Rob Murray	Springfield Falcons (AHL)	Free agency (UFA)	
August 12, 2002	Jason Botterill	Buffalo Sabres	Free agency (VI)	
September 13, 2002	Mike Vernon		Retirement (III)	
September 13, 2002	Kay Whitmore		Retirement (III)	
October 4, 2002	Ronald Petrovicky	New York Rangers	Waiver draft	
October 9, 2002	Burke Henry	Norfolk Admirals (AHL)	Free agency (UFA)	
October 17, 2002	Dwayne Hay	St. John's Maple Leafs (AHL) (Note: Hay signed with St. John's on November 27.)	Buyout	
March 11, 2003	Igor Kravchuk	Florida Panthers	Free agency (III)	

=== Signings ===
Date	Player	Term	Contract type	Ref
June 17, 2002	Rob Niedermayer		Re-signing	
June 22, 2002	Jamie McLennan		Re-signing	
June 28, 2002	Chuck Kobasew	3-year	Entry-level	
July 15, 2002	Mathias Johansson		Entry-level	
July 16, 2002	Jamie Wright		Re-signing	
July 19, 2002	Chris Clark		Re-signing	
August 1, 2002	Toni Lydman		Re-signing	
August 1, 2002	Robyn Regehr		Re-signing	
August 3, 2002	Denis Gauthier	2-year	Arbitration award	
August 9, 2002	Steve Begin		Re-signing	
August 21, 2002	Matthew Lombardi		Entry-level	
September 6, 2002	Jarome Iginla	2-year	Re-signing	
September 9, 2002	Craig Berube		Re-signing	
September 12, 2002	Ladislav Kohn		Re-signing	
May 28, 2003	Chris Clark		Extension	
May 28, 2003	Shean Donovan	3-year	Extension	
June 5, 2003	Robyn Regehr	5-year	Extension	

== Draft picks ==
Calgary's picks at the 2002 NHL entry draft in Toronto, Ontario. The Flames had the 9th overall pick, however opted to drop down one spot to 10th via a trade with the Florida Panthers.

Rnd	Pick	Player	Nationality	Position	Team (league)	NHL statistics				
Rnd	Pick	Player	Nationality	Position	Team (league)	GP	G	A	Pts	PIM
1	10	Eric Nystrom	United States	LW	University of Michigan (CCHA)	593	75	48	123	401
2	39	Brian McConnell	United States	F	Boston University (HE)					
3	90	Matthew Lombardi	Canada	C	Victoriaville Tigres (QMJHL)	536	101	161	262	293
4	112	Yuri Artyomenkov	Russia	RW	Krylja					
5	141	Jiri Cetkovsky	Czech Republic	RW	Zlin (Czech Jr.)					
5	142	Emanuel Peter	Switzerland	C	Kloten (Swiss Jr.)					
5	146	Viktor Bobrov	Russia	F	HC CSKA (RSL)					
5	159	Kristofer Persson	Sweden	RW	Modo Jr.					
6	176	Curtis McElhinney	Canada	G	Colorado College (WCHA)	249	94–95–20, 2.83GAA			
7	202	David Van der Gulik	Canada	RW	Chilliwack Chiefs (BCHL)	49	2	11	13	10
7	203	Pierre Johnsson	Sweden	RW	Farjestad Jr.					
8	238	Jyri Marttinen	Finland	D	Jyvaskyla					

== Farm teams ==
=== Saint John Flames ===
The 2002–03 season would be the tenth, and last, season in New Brunswick, as the Flames bought out the local ownership's share of the team following the season and suspended operations. The "Baby Flames" finished 32–41–6–1, last in the Canadian Division, and out of the playoffs. Robert Dome led the team with 27 goals and 56 points. Dany Sabourin and Levente Szuper split goaltending duties for the Flames.

=== Johnstown Chiefs ===
The Chiefs finished the 2002–03 season with a record of 28–33–11, finishing fifth in the Northwest Division, failing to qualify for the playoffs.

Following the season, the Flames announced they were switching affiliations to a new expansion team, the Las Vegas Wranglers.

== See also ==
- 2002–03 NHL season
