= 2002–03 San Jose Sharks season =

National Hockey League team season

2002–03 San Jose Sharks
- Division: 5th Pacific
- Conference: 14th Western
- 2002–03 record: 28–37–9–8
- Home record: 17–16–5–3
- Road record: 11–21–4–5
- Goals for: 214
- Goals against: 239

Team information
- General manager: Dean Lombardi (Oct.–Mar.)
- Coach: Darryl Sutter (Oct.–Dec.); Cap Raeder (Dec.); Ron Wilson (Dec.–Apr.)
- Captain: Owen Nolan (Oct.–Mar.); Vacant (Mar.–Apr.)
- Alternate captains: Vincent Damphousse; Mike Ricci
- Arena: HP Pavilion at San Jose
- Average attendance: 17,350
- Minor league affiliates: Cleveland Barons; Richmond Renegades

Team leaders
- Goals: Teemu Selanne (28), Patrick Marleau, Marco Sturm
- Assists: Teemu Selanne (36)
- Points: Teemu Selanne (64)
- Penalty minutes: Bryan Marchment (108)
- Plus/minus: Marco Sturm (+9)
- Wins: Evgeni Nabokov (19)
- Goals against average: Vesa Toskala (2.35)

The 2002–03 San Jose Sharks season was the Sharks' twelfth season of operation in the National Hockey League (NHL). The Sharks placed 14th in the conference and did not qualify for the playoffs for the first time since the 1996–97 season, thus ending their five-year playoff streak. This would also be the last time the Sharks missed the playoffs until the 2014–15 season.

== Regular season ==
After 24 games and an 8–12–2–2 record, Darryl Sutter was fired. One game was coached by Cap Raeder before Ron Wilson, the former coach of the Washington Capitals was hired. Wilson was not able to guide the team to the playoffs and finished with a 19–25–7–6 record for the season. General manager Dean Lombardi was fired on March 18.

Captain Owen Nolan was traded to the Toronto Maple Leafs.

The Sharks' penalty kill struggled, as they finished 30th overall in penalty-kill percentage, at 81.01%.

=== Final standings ===
Pacific Division
No.	CR		GP	W	L	T	OTL	GF	GA	Pts
1	1	**Dallas Stars**	82	46	17	15	4	245	169	111
2	7	**Mighty Ducks of Anaheim**	82	40	27	9	6	203	193	95
3	10	Los Angeles Kings	82	33	37	6	6	203	221	78
4	11	Phoenix Coyotes	82	31	35	11	5	204	230	78
5	14	San Jose Sharks	82	28	37	9	8	214	239	73

Note: CR = Conference rank; GP = Games played; W = Wins; L = Losses; T = Ties; OTL = Overtime loss; GF = Goals for; GA = Goals against; Pts = Points
Bolded teams qualified for the playoffs.

Western Conference
R		Div	GP	W	L	T	OTL	GF	GA	Pts
**1**	**Z-** Dallas Stars	**PA**	**82**	**46**	**17**	**15**	**4**	**245**	**169**	111
**2**	**Y-** Detroit Red Wings	**CE**	**82**	**48**	**20**	**10**	**4**	**269**	**203**	110
**3**	**Y-** Colorado Avalanche	**NW**	**82**	**42**	**19**	**13**	**8**	**251**	**194**	105
**4**	**X-** Vancouver Canucks	**NW**	**82**	**45**	**23**	**13**	**1**	**264**	**208**	104
**5**	**X-** St. Louis Blues	**CE**	**82**	**41**	**24**	**11**	**6**	**253**	**222**	99
**6**	**X-** Minnesota Wild	**NW**	**82**	**42**	**29**	**10**	**1**	**198**	**178**	95
**7**	**X-** Mighty Ducks of Anaheim	**PA**	**82**	**40**	**27**	**9**	**6**	**203**	**193**	95
**8**	**X-** Edmonton Oilers	**NW**	**82**	**36**	**26**	**11**	**9**	**231**	**230**	92
8.5
9	Chicago Blackhawks	CE	82	30	33	13	6	207	226	79
10	Los Angeles Kings	PA	82	33	37	6	6	203	221	78
11	Phoenix Coyotes	PA	82	31	35	11	5	204	230	78
12	Calgary Flames	NW	82	29	36	13	4	186	228	75
13	Nashville Predators	CE	82	27	35	13	7	183	206	74
14	San Jose Sharks	PA	82	28	37	9	8	214	239	73
15	Columbus Blue Jackets	CE	82	29	42	8	3	213	263	69

Divisions: PA – Pacific, CE – Central, NW – Northwest

Z – Clinched conference; Y – Clinched division; X – Clinched playoff spot

== Schedule and results ==
2002–03 regular season
October: 3–6–0–1 (home: 1–3–0–0; road: 2–3–0–1)

Game	Date	Score	Opponent	Decision	Record	Recap
1	October 10, 2002	3–6	Detroit Red Wings (2002–03)	Kiprusoff	0–1–0–0	L
2	October 12, 2002	3–5	@ Vancouver Canucks (2002–03)	Kiprusoff	0–2–0–0	L
3	October 17, 2002	4–3	Edmonton Oilers (2002–03)	Toskala	1–2–0–0	W
4	October 19, 2002	1–3	Colorado Avalanche (2002–03)	Toskala	1–3–0–0	L
5	October 21, 2002	2–5	Vancouver Canucks (2002–03)	Kiprusoff	1–4–0–0	L
6	October 24, 2002	2–1	@ Nashville Predators (2002–03)	Kiprusoff	2–4–0–0	W
7	October 25, 2002	5–4	@ Columbus Blue Jackets (2002–03)	Kiprusoff	3–4–0–0	W
8	October 27, 2002	2–3	@ Chicago Blackhawks (2002–03)	Nabokov	3–5–0–0	L
9	October 29, 2002	2–3	@ Detroit Red Wings (2002–03)	Nabokov	3–6–0–0	L
10	October 31, 2002	1–2 OT	@ Minnesota Wild (2002–03)	Nabokov	3–6–0–1	OTL

November: 5–6–2–1 (home: 1–3–1–0; road: 4–3–1–1)

Game	Date	Score	Opponent	Decision	Record	Recap
11	November 3, 2002	4–3	@ Mighty Ducks of Anaheim (2002–03)	Nabokov	4–6–0–1	W
12	November 5, 2002	5–2	Los Angeles Kings (2002–03)	Nabokov	5–6–0–1	W
13	November 7, 2002	2–2 OT	Nashville Predators (2002–03)	Nabokov	5–6–1–1	T
14	November 9, 2002	2–4	Minnesota Wild (2002–03)	Nabokov	5–7–1–1	L
15	November 11, 2002	4–5	New York Rangers (2002–03)	Kiprusoff	5–8–1–1	L
16	November 13, 2002	2–3 OT	@ Atlanta Thrashers (2002–03)	Nabokov	5–8–1–2	OTL
17	November 15, 2002	2–4	@ Tampa Bay Lightning (2002–03)	Nabokov	5–9–1–2	L
18	November 16, 2002	7–3	@ Florida Panthers (2002–03)	Nabokov	6–9–1–2	W
19	November 19, 2002	3–2	@ Washington Capitals (2002–03)	Nabokov	7–9–1–2	W
20	November 21, 2002	2–2 OT	@ Philadelphia Flyers (2002–03)	Nabokov	7–9–2–2	T
21	November 23, 2002	1–4	@ Pittsburgh Penguins (2002–03)	Nabokov	7–10–2–2	L
22	November 25, 2002	4–1	@ St. Louis Blues (2002–03)	Nabokov	8–10–2–2	W
23	November 27, 2002	2–4	@ Nashville Predators (2002–03)	Nabokov	8–11–2–2	L
24	November 30, 2002	2–3	Phoenix Coyotes (2002–03)	Nabokov	8–12–2–2	L

December: 7–3–2–1 (home: 5–1–1–0; road: 2–2–1–1)

Game	Date	Score	Opponent	Decision	Record	Recap
25	December 3, 2002	3–2 OT	@ Phoenix Coyotes (2002–03)	Nabokov	9–12–2–2	W
26	December 6, 2002	3–2	Columbus Blue Jackets (2002–03)	Nabokov	10–12–2–2	W
27	December 7, 2002	2–4	Nashville Predators (2002–03)	Nabokov	10–13–2–2	L
28	December 12, 2002	5–2	Pittsburgh Penguins (2002–03)	Nabokov	11–13–2–2	W
29	December 14, 2002	2–0	Washington Capitals (2002–03)	Nabokov	12–13–2–2	W
30	December 16, 2002	1–2 OT	@ New York Rangers (2002–03)	Kiprusoff	12–13–2–3	OTL
31	December 17, 2002	3–1	@ Montreal Canadiens (2002–03)	Nabokov	13–13–2–3	W
32	December 19, 2002	3–9	@ Ottawa Senators (2002–03)	Nabokov	13–14–2–3	L
33	December 21, 2002	3–3 OT	@ Toronto Maple Leafs (2002–03)	Nabokov	13–14–3–3	T
34	December 23, 2002	2–5	@ Boston Bruins (2002–03)	Nabokov	13–15–3–3	L
35	December 26, 2002	4–1	Mighty Ducks of Anaheim (2002–03)	Nabokov	14–15–3–3	W
36	December 28, 2002	3–3 OT	Chicago Blackhawks (2002–03)	Nabokov	14–15–4–3	T
37	December 30, 2002	2–1	Philadelphia Flyers (2002–03)	Nabokov	15–15–4–3	W

January: 4–6–2–2 (home: 3–5–2–1; road: 1–1–0–1)

Game	Date	Score	Opponent	Decision	Record	Recap
38	January 2, 2003	1–3	Dallas Stars (2002–03)	Nabokov	15–16–4–3	L
39	January 4, 2003	1–6	Colorado Avalanche (2002–03)	Nabokov	15–17–4–3	L
40	January 6, 2003	5–5 OT	Edmonton Oilers (2002–03)	Nabokov	15–17–5–3	T
41	January 9, 2003	1–4	St. Louis Blues (2002–03)	Nabokov	15–18–5–3	L
42	January 11, 2003	3–0	Vancouver Canucks (2002–03)	Kiprusoff	16–18–5–3	W
43	January 13, 2003	2–3 OT	@ Los Angeles Kings (2002–03)	Kiprusoff	16–18–5–4	OTL
44	January 16, 2003	2–2 OT	Buffalo Sabres (2002–03)	Nabokov	16–18–6–4	T
45	January 18, 2003	1–3	Dallas Stars (2002–03)	Nabokov	16–19–6–4	L
46	January 20, 2003	1–3	@ Phoenix Coyotes (2002–03)	Nabokov	16–20–6–4	L
47	January 22, 2003	4–5 OT	New Jersey Devils (2002–03)	Kiprusoff	16–20–6–5	OTL
48	January 25, 2003	4–1	Minnesota Wild (2002–03)	Nabokov	17–20–6–5	W
49	January 27, 2003	3–0	@ Los Angeles Kings (2002–03)	Nabokov	18–20–6–5	W
50	January 28, 2003	3–1	Los Angeles Kings (2002–03)	Nabokov	19–20–6–5	W
51	January 30, 2003	3–4	Mighty Ducks of Anaheim (2002–03)	Nabokov	19–21–6–5	L

February: 5–7–0–0 (home: 3–1–0–0; road: 2–6–0–0)

Game	Date	Score	Opponent	Decision	Record	Recap
52	February 5, 2003	6–2	Carolina Hurricanes (2002–03)	Nabokov	20–21–6–5	W
53	February 7, 2003	3–4	@ Minnesota Wild (2002–03)	Nabokov	20–22–6–5	L
54	February 8, 2003	1–4	@ St. Louis Blues (2002–03)	Nabokov	20–23–6–5	L
55	February 10, 2003	4–5	@ Detroit Red Wings (2002–03)	Nabokov	20–24–6–5	L
56	February 12, 2003	0–1	@ Columbus Blue Jackets (2002–03)	Kiprusoff	20–25–6–5	L
57	February 14, 2003	4–2	@ Chicago Blackhawks (2002–03)	Kiprusoff	21–25–6–5	W
58	February 16, 2003	1–3	@ Dallas Stars (2002–03)	Kiprusoff	21–26–6–5	L
59	February 17, 2003	2–3	@ Los Angeles Kings (2002–03)	Nabokov	21–27–6–5	L
60	February 19, 2003	0–3	New York Islanders (2002–03)	Nabokov	21–28–6–5	L
61	February 21, 2003	6–0	Columbus Blue Jackets (2002–03)	Nabokov	22–28–6–5	W
62	February 24, 2003	5–2	Calgary Flames (2002–03)	Nabokov	23–28–6–5	W
63	February 27, 2003	3–2	@ Vancouver Canucks (2002–03)	Nabokov	24–28–6–5	W

March: 4–9–0–3 (home: 4–3–0–2; road: 0–6–0–1)

Game	Date	Score	Opponent	Decision	Record	Recap
64	March 1, 2003	3–4	@ Calgary Flames (2002–03)	Nabokov	24–29–6–5	L
65	March 4, 2003	1–2	@ Edmonton Oilers (2002–03)	Kiprusoff	24–30–6–5	L
66	March 6, 2003	4–3 OT	Montreal Canadiens (2002–03)	Kiprusoff	25–30–6–5	W
67	March 8, 2003	4–6	@ Phoenix Coyotes (2002–03)	Nabokov	25–31–6–5	L
68	March 9, 2003	0–3	@ Dallas Stars (2002–03)	Kiprusoff	25–32–6–5	L
69	March 11, 2003	2–4	St. Louis Blues (2002–03)	Kiprusoff	25–33–6–5	L
70	March 13, 2003	2–3 OT	@ Mighty Ducks of Anaheim (2002–03)	Kiprusoff	25–33–6–6	OTL
71	March 15, 2003	3–2	Calgary Flames (2002–03)	Toskala	26–33–6–6	W
72	March 17, 2003	2–3 OT	Chicago Blackhawks (2002–03)	Toskala	26–33–6–7	OTL
73	March 20, 2003	0–2	@ Colorado Avalanche (2002–03)	Kiprusoff	26–34–6–7	L
74	March 21, 2003	3–2	Boston Bruins (2002–03)	Toskala	27–34–6–7	W
75	March 22, 2003	2–3 OT	Mighty Ducks of Anaheim (2002–03)	Nabokov	27–34–6–8	OTL
76	March 24, 2003	1–4	Tampa Bay Lightning (2002–03)	Nabokov	27–35–6–8	L
77	March 27, 2003	3–0	Detroit Red Wings (2002–03)	Toskala	28–35–6–8	W
78	March 29, 2003	3–4	Dallas Stars (2002–03)	Toskala	28–36–6–8	L
79	March 31, 2003	1–3	@ Colorado Avalanche (2002–03)	Nabokov	28–37–6–8	L

April: 0–0–3–0 (home: 0–0–1–0; road: 0–0–2–0)

Game	Date	Score	Opponent	Decision	Record	Recap
80	April 2, 2003	2–2 OT	@ Calgary Flames (2002–03)	Nabokov	28–37–7–8	T
81	April 3, 2003	3–3 OT	@ Edmonton Oilers (2002–03)	Toskala	28–37–8–8	T
82	April 6, 2003	3–3 OT	Phoenix Coyotes (2002–03)	Nabokov	28–37–9–8	T

Legend: W Win (2 points) L Loss (0 points) T Tie (1 point) OTL Overtime loss (1 point)

== Player statistics ==
=== Scoring ===
- Position abbreviations: C = Center; D = Defense; G = Goaltender; LW = Left wing; RW = Right wing
- † = Joined team via a transaction (e.g., trade, waivers, signing) during the season. Stats reflect time with the Sharks only.
- ‡ = Left team via a transaction (e.g., trade, waivers, release) during the season. Stats reflect time with the Sharks only.

No.	Player	Pos	Regular season					
No.	Player	Pos	GP	G	A	Pts	+/-	PIM
8	Teemu Selanne	RW	82	28	36	64	−6	30
25	Vincent Damphousse	C	82	23	38	61	−13	66
12	Patrick Marleau	C	82	28	29	57	−10	33
19	Marco Sturm	LW	82	28	20	48	9	16
11	Owen Nolan‡	RW	61	22	20	42	−5	91
18	Mike Ricci	C	75	11	23	34	−12	53
2	Mike Rathje	D	82	7	22	29	−19	48
22	Scott Hannan	D	81	3	19	22	0	61
17	Scott Thornton	LW	41	9	12	21	−7	41
21	Jim Fahey	D	43	1	19	20	−3	33
13	Todd Harvey	RW	76	3	16	19	5	74
9	Adam Graves	LW	82	9	9	18	−14	32
14	Jonathan Cheechoo	RW	66	9	7	16	−5	39
3	Dan McGillis†‡	D	37	3	13	16	−6	30
16	Mark Smith	C	75	4	11	15	1	64
7	Brad Stuart	D	36	4	10	14	−6	46
23	Niko Dimitrakos	RW	21	6	7	13	−7	8
24	Niklas Sundstrom‡	RW	47	2	10	12	−4	22
27	Bryan Marchment‡	D	67	2	9	11	−2	108
10	Alyn McCauley†	C	16	3	7	10	−2	4
10	Marcus Ragnarsson‡	D	25	1	7	8	2	30
4	Kyle McLaren†	D	33	0	8	8	−10	30
5	Jeff Jillson‡	D	26	0	6	6	−7	9
28	Matt Bradley‡	RW	46	2	3	5	−1	37
26	Lynn Loyns	LW	19	3	0	3	−4	19
38	Rob Davison	D	15	1	2	3	4	22
46	Miroslav Zalesak	RW	10	1	2	3	−2	0
15	Wayne Primeau†	C	7	1	1	2	2	0
23	Shawn Heins‡	D	20	0	1	1	−2	9
41	Ryan Kraft	C	7	0	1	1	2	0
53	Jesse Fibiger	D	16	0	0	0	−5	2
4	John Jakopin	D	12	0	0	0	0	11
37	Miikka Kiprusoff	G	22	0	0	0		0
20	Evgeni Nabokov	G	55	0	0	0		10
29	Vesa Toskala	G	11	0	0	0		0
49	Chad Wiseman	LW	4	0	0	0	−2	4

=== Goaltending ===
No.	Player	Regular season									
No.	Player	GP	W	L	T	SA	GA	GAA	SV%	SO	TOI
20	Evgeni Nabokov	55	19	28	8	1561	146	2.71	.906	3	3227
37	Miikka Kiprusoff	22	5	14	0	537	65	3.25	.879	1	1199
29	Vesa Toskala	11	4	3	1	287	21	2.35	.927	1	537

== Awards and records ==
=== Awards ===
Type	Award/honor	Recipient	Ref
League (in-season)	NHL All-Star Game selection	Teemu Selanne (Note: Selanne was voted to the starting lineup.)	
Team	Sharks Player of the Year	Teemu Selanne	
Team	Sharks Rookie of the Year	Jim Fahey	

=== Milestones ===
Milestone	Player	Date	Ref
First game	Jonathan Cheechoo	October 10, 2002	
First game	Lynn Loyns	October 21, 2002	
First game	Ryan Kraft	November 23, 2002	
First game	Jim Fahey	December 12, 2002	
First game	Niko Dimitrakos	February 12, 2003	
First game	Chad Wiseman	March 4, 2003	
First game	Jesse Fibiger	March 6, 2003	
First game	Rob Davison	March 9, 2003	
First game	Miroslav Zalesak	March 11, 2003	
400th goal	Vincent Damphousse	October 17, 2002	
750th game coached	Ron Wilson	March 11, 2003	

== Transactions ==
The Sharks were involved in the following transactions from June 14, 2002, the day after the deciding game of the 2002 Stanley Cup Finals, through June 9, 2003, the day of the deciding game of the 2003 Stanley Cup Finals.

=== Trades ===
Date	Details		Ref
June 22, 2002	To San Jose Sharks: Phoenix's 2nd-round pick in 2002	To Tampa Bay Lightning: 2nd-round pick in 2002; 5th-round pick in 2002	
June 22, 2002	To San Jose Sharks: 3rd-round pick in 2002	To Chicago Blackhawks: 3rd-round pick in 2002; 4th-round pick in 2002	
June 23, 2002	To San Jose Sharks: 6th-round pick in 2003; Future considerations (Note: The Rangers sent San Jose the rights to Theoren Fleury on June 26 to complete the trade.)	To New York Rangers: 6th-round pick in 2002	
June 23, 2002	To San Jose Sharks: New Jersey's 7th-round pick in 2002	To Atlanta Thrashers: 8th-round pick in 2002; 7th-round pick in 2003	
July 16, 2002	To San Jose Sharks: Future considerations (Note: 7th-round pick in 2003)	To Florida Panthers: Hannes Hyvonen	
December 6, 2002	To San Jose Sharks: Dan McGillis	To Philadelphia Flyers: Marcus Ragnarsson	
January 23, 2003	To San Jose Sharks: Jeff Hackett	To Montreal Canadiens: Niklas Sundstrom; 3rd-round pick in 2004	
January 23, 2003	To San Jose Sharks: Rights to Kyle McLaren; 4th-round pick in 2004	To Boston Bruins: Jeff Hackett; Jeff Jillson	
February 9, 2003	To San Jose Sharks: Conditional 5th-round pick in 2003	To Pittsburgh Penguins: Shawn Heins	
March 5, 2003	To San Jose Sharks: Brad Boyes; Alyn McCauley; 1st-round pick in 2003	To Toronto Maple Leafs: Owen Nolan	
March 8, 2003	To San Jose Sharks: 3rd-round pick in 2003; 5th-round pick in 2003	To Colorado Avalanche: Bryan Marchment	
March 11, 2003	To San Jose Sharks: 2nd-round pick in 2003	To Boston Bruins: Dan McGillis	
March 11, 2003	To San Jose Sharks: Wayne Primeau	To Pittsburgh Penguins: Matt Bradley	

=== Players acquired ===
Date	Player	Former team	Term	Via	Ref
July 10, 2002	David Cloutier	Cape Breton Screaming Eagles (QMJHL)		Free agency	
September 5, 2002	Tavis Hansen	Hershey Bears (AHL)		Free agency	
September 5, 2002	John Jakopin	Pittsburgh Penguins		Free agency	
September 5, 2002	Jeff Nelson	Schwenninger Wild Wings (DEL)		Free agency	
September 5, 2002	Scott Thomas	Los Angeles Kings		Free agency	
September 20, 2002	Josh Gorges	Kelowna Rockets (WHL)		Free agency	
April 4, 2003	Tom Preissing	Colorado College (WCHA)		Free agency	
April 4, 2003	Craig Valette	Portland Winterhawks (WHL)		Free agency	
April 18, 2003	Grant Stevenson	Minnesota State University, Mankato (WCHA)		Free agency	

=== Players lost ===
Date	Player	New team	Via (Note: In parentheses is the player's free agency group on July 1 if applicable.)	Ref
N/A	Joel Prpic	Kokudo Tokyo (JIHL)	Free agency (VI)	
July 9, 2002	Alexander Korolyuk	Ak Bars Kazan (RSL)	Free agency (II) (Note: San Jose retained Korolyuk’s NHL rights and re-signed him on June 21, 2003.)	
July 16, 2002	Steve Bancroft	St. Louis Blues	Free agency (VI)	
July 16, 2002	Andy Lundbohm	Florida Panthers	Free agency (VI)	
August 2, 2002	Stephane Matteau	Florida Panthers	Free agency (III)	
August 3, 2002	Brandon Smith	New York Islanders	Free agency (VI)	
August 15, 2002	Theoren Fleury	Chicago Blackhawks	Free agency (III)	
September 10, 2002	Gary Suter		Retirement (III)	
N/A	Adam Colagiacomo	Roanoke Express (ECHL)	Free agency (UFA)	
October 22, 2002	Adam Nittel	Quad City Mallards (UHL)	Free agency (UFA)	

=== Signings ===
Date	Player	Term	Contract type	Ref
July 1, 2002	Shawn Heins		Re-signing	
July 1, 2002	Patrick Marleau		Option exercised	
July 1, 2002	Marco Sturm		Option exercised	
July 5, 2002	Teemu Selanne	1-year (Note: Player option for a second year.)	Re-signing	
August 9, 2002	Marcus Ragnarsson		Re-signing	
August 16, 2002	Niklas Sundstrom	2-year	Arbitration award	
September 4, 2002	Jim Fahey		Entry-level	
September 4, 2002	Ryan Kraft		Re-signing	
September 4, 2002	Willie Levesque		Entry-level	
September 4, 2002	Mark Smith		Re-signing	
September 5, 2002	Niko Dimitrakos		Entry-level	
September 6, 2002	Matt Bradley		Re-signing	
September 13, 2002	Scott Hannan	1-year	Re-signing	
September 23, 2002	Tomas Plihal		Entry-level	
October 22, 2002	Evgeni Nabokov	2-year	Re-signing	
November 13, 2002	Brad Stuart	2-year (Note: Club and player options for a third year.)	Re-signing	
January 25, 2003	Kyle McLaren	4-year	Re-signing	
May 22, 2003	Douglas Murray		Entry-level	
May 22, 2003	Mike Ricci	1-year	Option exercised	
May 30, 2003	Vincent Damphousse	1-year	Option exercised	

== Draft picks ==
San Jose's draft picks at the 2002 NHL entry draft at the Air Canada Centre in Toronto, Ontario.

Round	#	Player	Position	Nationality	College/Junior/Club team
1	27	Mike Morris	Right wing	United States	St. Sebastian's School (USHS-MA)
2	52	Dan Spang	Defense	United States	Winchester High School (USHS-MA)
3	86	Jonas Fiedler	Right wing	Czech Republic	Plymouth Whalers (OHL)
5	139	Kris Newbury	Center	Canada	Sarnia Sting (OHL)
5	163	Tom Walsh	Center	United States	Deerfield Academy (USHS-MA)
7	217	Tim Conboy	Defense	United States	Topeka ScareCrows (USHL)
9	288	Michael Hutchins	Defense	United States	Des Moines Buccaneers (USHL)

== See also ==
- 2002–03 NHL season
