= 2002–03 New York Rangers season =

NHL hockey team season

2002–03 New York Rangers
- Division: 4th Atlantic
- Conference: 9th Eastern
- 2002–03 record: 32–36–10–4
- Home record: 17–18–4–2
- Road record: 15–18–6–2
- Goals for: 210
- Goals against: 231

Team information
- General manager: Glen Sather
- Coach: Bryan Trottier (Oct.–Jan.); Glen Sather (Jan.–Apr.)
- Captain: Mark Messier
- Alternate captains: Brian Leetch; Eric Lindros
- Arena: Madison Square Garden
- Average attendance: 18,148 (99.7%)
- Minor league affiliates: Hartford Wolf Pack; Charlotte Checkers

Team leaders
- Goals: Petr Nedved (27)
- Assists: Tom Poti (37)
- Points: Petr Nedved (58)
- Penalty minutes: Dale Purinton (161)
- Plus/minus: Cory Cross (+13)
- Wins: Mike Dunham (19)
- Goals against average: Mike Dunham (2.29)

The 2002–03 New York Rangers season was the franchise's 77th season. In the regular season, the Rangers posted a 32–36–10–4 record, finishing fourth in the Atlantic Division. The Rangers' ninth-place finish in the Eastern Conference left them out of the Stanley Cup playoffs for the sixth straight season for the first time in franchise history.

The Rangers entered the season under the supervision of former Colorado Avalanche assistant coach and New York Islanders star Bryan Trottier in his first head coaching role. With the team on the outside of the playoff picture, he was fired after 54 games and replaced with general manager Glen Sather.

The Rangers saw a major milestone reached as goaltender Mike Richter won his 300th game with the team. Shortly thereafter, he suffered a concussion against the Edmonton Oilers when Todd Marchant accidentally struck his head with his knee. Combined with a skull fracture Richter suffered toward the end of the previous season when hit in the face with a slap shot, it was the second such injury he suffered in the previous eight months and caused him to miss the rest of the season. Richter retired before the start of the next season.

== Regular season ==
=== Final standings ===
Atlantic Division
No.	CR		GP	W	L	T	OTL	GF	GA	Pts
1	2	**New Jersey Devils**	82	46	20	10	6	216	166	108
2	4	**Philadelphia Flyers**	82	45	20	13	4	211	166	107
3	8	**New York Islanders**	82	35	34	11	2	224	231	83
4	9	New York Rangers	82	32	36	10	4	210	231	78
5	14	Pittsburgh Penguins	82	27	44	6	5	189	255	65

Note: CR = Conference rank; GP = Games played; W = Wins; L = Losses; T = Ties; OTL = Overtime loss; GF = Goals for; GA = Goals against; Pts = Points
Bolded teams qualified for the playoffs.

Eastern Conference
R		Div	GP	W	L	T	OTL	GF	GA	Pts
**1**	**P-** Ottawa Senators	**NE**	**82**	**52**	**21**	**8**	**1**	**263**	**182**	113
**2**	**Y-** New Jersey Devils	**AT**	**82**	**46**	**20**	**10**	**6**	**216**	**166**	108
**3**	**Y-** Tampa Bay Lightning	**SE**	**82**	**36**	**25**	**16**	**5**	**219**	**210**	93
**4**	**X-** Philadelphia Flyers	**AT**	**82**	**45**	**20**	**13**	**4**	**211**	**166**	107
**5**	**X-** Toronto Maple Leafs	**NE**	**82**	**44**	**28**	**7**	**3**	**236**	**208**	98
**6**	**X-** Washington Capitals	**SE**	**82**	**39**	**29**	**8**	**6**	**224**	**220**	92
**7**	**X-** Boston Bruins	**NE**	**82**	**36**	**31**	**11**	**4**	**245**	**237**	87
**8**	**X-** New York Islanders	**AT**	**82**	**35**	**34**	**11**	**2**	**224**	**231**	83
8.5
9	New York Rangers	AT	82	32	36	10	4	210	231	78
10	Montreal Canadiens	NE	82	30	35	8	9	206	234	77
11	Atlanta Thrashers	SE	82	31	39	7	5	226	284	74
12	Buffalo Sabres	NE	82	27	37	10	8	190	219	72
13	Florida Panthers	SE	82	24	36	13	9	176	237	70
14	Pittsburgh Penguins	AT	82	27	44	6	5	189	255	65
15	Carolina Hurricanes	SE	82	22	43	11	6	171	240	61

Divisions: AT – Atlantic, NE – Northeast, SE – Southeast

P – Clinched Presidents Trophy; Y – Clinched division; X – Clinched playoff spot

== Schedule and results ==
2002–03 regular season
October: 4–6–2–0 (home: 2–4–1–0; road: 2–2–1–0)

Game	Date	Opponent	Score	Record	Recap
1	October 9	@ Carolina Hurricanes	4–1	1–0–0–0	W
2	October 11	Montreal Canadiens	4–1	1–1–0–0	L
3	October 12	@ Pittsburgh Penguins	6–0	1–2–0–0	L
4	October 15	Toronto Maple Leafs	5–4	2–2–0–0	W
5	October 17	@ Buffalo Sabres	4–4 OT	2–2–1–0	T
6	October 19	Nashville Predators	2–2 OT	2–2–2–0	T
7	October 21	Tampa Bay Lightning	4–2	2–3–2–0	L
8	October 23	Washington Capitals	2–1	2–4–2–0	L
9	October 25	Los Angeles Kings	6–2	2–5–2–0	L
10	October 26	@ Toronto Maple Leafs	4–3	3–5–2–0	W
11	October 28	Phoenix Coyotes	3–2 OT	4–5–2–0	W
12	October 30	@ Tampa Bay Lightning	3–0	4–6–2–0	L

November: 6–6–2–0 (home: 4–2–0–0; road: 2–4–2–0)

Game	Date	Opponent	Score	Record	Recap
13	November 2	@ Boston Bruins	3–2	4–7–2–0	L
14	November 3	St. Louis Blues	3–2	4–8–2–0	L
15	November 5	Edmonton Oilers	5–2	5–8–2–0	W
16	November 7	Calgary Flames	1–0 OT	6–8–2–0	W
17	November 9	@ Columbus Blue Jackets	6–3	6–9–2–0	L
18	November 11	@ San Jose Sharks	5–4	7–9–2–0	W
19	November 14	@ Calgary Flames	2–1	8–9–2–0	W
20	November 16	@ Vancouver Canucks	3–1	8–10–2-0	L
21	November 19	Mighty Ducks of Anaheim	3–2 OT	9–10–2–0	W
22	November 21	@ New Jersey Devils	4–4 OT	9–10–3–0	T
23	November 23	New York Islanders	3–1	9–11–3–0	L
24	November 25	Carolina Hurricanes	3–1	10–11–3–0	W
25	November 28	@ Atlanta Thrashers	7–4	10–12–3–0	L
26	November 29	@ Dallas Stars	3–3 OT	10–12–4–0	T

December: 5–8–1–1 (home: 3–5–1–0; road: 2–3–0–1)

Game	Date	Opponent	Score	Record	Recap
27	December 1	Tampa Bay Lightning	4–3	11–12–4–0	W
28	December 3	Columbus Blue Jackets	5–3	12–12–4–0	W
29	December 5	@ Philadelphia Flyers	3–2 OT	12–12–4–1	OTL
30	December 6	Buffalo Sabres	4–1	12–13–4–1	L
31	December 8	Boston Bruins	4–1	12–14–4–1	L
32	December 11	Chicago Blackhawks	4–3	12–15–4–1	L
33	December 14	@ Toronto Maple Leafs	4–1	12–16–4–1	L
34	December 16	San Jose Sharks	2–1 OT	13–16–4–1	W
35	December 19	Montreal Canadiens	3–1	13–17–4–1	L
36	December 21	@ Detroit Red Wings	3–2	13–18–4–1	L
37	December 23	New Jersey Devils	2–2 OT	13–18–5–1	T
38	December 26	Pittsburgh Penguins	6–1	13–19–5–1	L
39	December 28	@ Florida Panthers	2–1 OT	14–19–5–1	W
40	December 29	@ Tampa Bay Lightning	5–3	14–20–5–1	L
41	December 31	@ Carolina Hurricanes	2–0	15–20–5–1	W

January: 6–6–1–1 (home: 2–3–1–1; road: 4–3–0–0)

Game	Date	Opponent	Score	Record	Recap
42	January 4	Washington Capitals	2–2 OT	15–20–6–1	T
43	January 6	Ottawa Senators	5–2	15–21–6–1	L
44	January 8	Carolina Hurricanes	5–1	16–21–6–1	W
45	January 9	@ Montreal Canadiens	3–2	16–22–6–1	L
46	January 11	@ Pittsburgh Penguins	3–1	17–22–6–1	W
47	January 13	Toronto Maple Leafs	5–1	18–22–6–1	W
48	January 15	@ Washington Capitals	2–1 OT	19–22–6–1	W
49	January 19	Philadelphia Flyers	4–2	19–23–6–1	L
50	January 21	@ New York Islanders	5–0	20–23–6–1	W
51	January 23	@ Nashville Predators	4–2	21–23–6–1	W
52	January 25	Atlanta Thrashers	4–1	21–24–6–1	L
53	January 26	@ Washington Capitals	7–2	21–25–6–1	L
54	January 28	@ Atlanta Thrashers	5–2	21–26–6–1	L
55	January 30	Colorado Avalanche	4–3 OT	21–26–6–2	OTL

February: 5–5–2–0 (home: 2–1–0–0; road: 3–4–2–0)

Game	Date	Opponent	Score	Record	Recap
56	February 5	Ottawa Senators	5–3	21–27–6–2	L
57	February 6	@ St. Louis Blues	4–4 OT	21–27–7–2	T
58	February 8	@ Philadelphia Flyers	2–1	21–28–7–2	L
59	February 12	@ Florida Panthers	3–1	22–28–7–2	W
60	February 14	Pittsburgh Penguins	1–0	23–28–7–2	W
61	February 15	@ Buffalo Sabres	5–4	23–29–7–2	L
62	February 17	@ Ottawa Senators	3–2	23–30–7–2	L
63	February 19	@ Minnesota Wild	4–2	24–30–7–2	W
64	February 21	@ Mighty Ducks of Anaheim	6–2	25–30–7–2	W
65	February 23	@ Colorado Avalanche	4–1	25–31–7–2	L
66	February 25	@ New Jersey Devils	3–3 OT	25–31–8–2	T
67	February 27	Boston Bruins	4–1	26–31–8–2	W

March: 6–3–1–2 (home: 4–2–1–1; road: 2–1–0–1)

Game	Date	Opponent	Score	Record	Recap
68	March 1	Florida Panthers	5–2	27–31–8–2	W
69	March 3	New York Islanders	1–1 OT	27–31–9–2	T
70	March 7	Philadelphia Flyers	5–1	28–31–9–2	W
71	March 10	Florida Panthers	2–1	28–32–9–2	L
72	March 13	@ Ottawa Senators	3–2 OT	28–32–9–3	OTL
73	March 15	@ New Jersey Devils	3–1	28–33–9–3	L
74	March 17	New York Islanders	1–0	29–33–9–3	W
75	March 19	Buffalo Sabres	3–0	30–33–9–3	W
76	March 22	@ Philadelphia Flyers	2–1	31–33–9–3	W
77	March 26	Pittsburgh Penguins	3–1	31–34–9–3	L
78	March 29	@ Boston Bruins	3–1	32–34–9–3	W
79	March 31	Atlanta Thrashers	4–3 OT	32–34–9–4	OTL

April: 0–2–1–0 (home: 0–1–0–0; road: 0–1–1–0)

Game	Date	Opponent	Score	Record	Recap
80	April 1	@ New York Islanders	2–2 OT	32–34–10–4	T
81	April 4	New Jersey Devils	2–1	32–35–10–4	L
82	April 5	@ Montreal Canadiens	5–4	32–36–10–4	L

Legend: W Win (2 points) L Loss (0 points) T Tie (1 point) OTL Overtime loss (1 point)

== Player statistics ==
=== Scoring ===
- Position abbreviations: C = Center; D = Defense; G = Goaltender; LW = Left wing; RW = Right wing
- † = Joined team via a transaction (e.g., trade, waivers, signing) during the season. Stats reflect time with the Rangers only.
- ‡ = Left team via a transaction (e.g., trade, waivers, release) during the season. Stats reflect time with the Rangers only.

No.	Player	Pos	Regular season					
No.	Player	Pos	GP	G	A	Pts	+/-	PIM
93	Petr Nedved	C	78	27	31	58	−4	64
88	Eric Lindros	C	81	19	34	53	5	141
3	Tom Poti	D	80	11	37	48	−6	60
11	Mark Messier	C	78	18	22	40	−2	30
36	Matthew Barnaby	LW	79	14	22	36	9	142
16	Bobby Holik	C	64	16	19	35	−1	50
9	Pavel Bure	RW	39	19	11	30	4	16
2	Brian Leetch	D	51	12	18	30	−3	20
20	Radek Dvorak‡	RW	63	6	21	27	−3	16
37	Mikael Samuelsson‡	RW	58	8	14	22	0	32
26	Jamie Lundmark	C	55	8	11	19	−3	16
23	Vladimir Malakhov	D	71	3	14	17	−7	52
10	Sandy McCarthy	RW	82	6	9	15	−4	81
38	Ronald Petrovicky	LW	66	5	9	14	−12	77
6	Darius Kasparaitis	D	80	3	11	14	5	85
27	Alexei Kovalev†	RW	24	10	3	13	2	20
17	Rem Murray‡	LW	32	6	6	12	−3	4
39	Joel Bouchard‡	D	27	5	7	12	6	14
29	Boris Mironov†	D	36	3	9	12	3	34
5	Dale Purinton	D	58	3	9	12	−2	161
27	Rico Fata‡	LW	36	2	4	6	−1	6
22	Anson Carter†	RW	11	1	4	5	0	6
39	Dan LaCouture†	LW	24	1	4	5	4	0
18	Cory Cross†‡	D	26	0	4	4	13	16
8	Ted Donato	C	49	2	1	3	−1	6
42	John Tripp	RW	9	1	2	3	1	2
33	Dave Karpa	D	19	0	2	2	−1	14
24	Sylvain Lefebvre	D	35	0	2	2	−7	10
21	Richard Lintner‡	D	10	1	0	1	−5	0
30	Mike Dunham†	G	43	0	1	1		0
32	Gordie Dwyer†‡	LW	17	0	1	1	−1	50
40	Johan Holmqvist‡	G	1	0	0	0		0
22	Mike Wilson†	D	1	0	0	0	1	0
28 (Note: Lyashenko wore number 19 in his first game.)	Roman Lyashenko	C	2	0	0	0	−2	0
18	Ales Pisa†	D	3	0	0	0	1	0
22	Josh Green†‡	LW	4	0	0	0	−1	2
12	Dixon Ward	LW	8	0	0	0	−2	2
29	Krzysztof Oliwa‡	LW	9	0	0	0	1	51
44	Billy Tibbetts†	C	11	0	0	0	−2	12
35	Mike Richter	G	13	0	0	0		0
31	Dan Blackburn	G	32	0	0	0		2

=== Goaltending ===
- † = Joined team via a transaction (e.g., trade, waivers, signing) during the season. Stats reflect time with the Rangers only.
- ‡ = Left team via a transaction (e.g., trade, waivers, release) during the season. Stats reflect time with the Rangers only.

No.	Player	Regular season									
No.	Player	GP	W	L	T	SA	GA	GAA	SV%	SO	TOI
30	Mike Dunham†	43	19	17	5	1229	94	2.29	.924	5	2467
31	Dan Blackburn	32	8	16	4	842	93	3.17	.890	1	1762
35	Mike Richter	13	5	6	1	329	34	2.94	.897	0	694
40	Johan Holmqvist‡	1	0	1	0	18	2	3.08	.889	0	39

== Awards and records ==
=== Awards ===
Type	Award/honor	Recipient	Ref
League (in-season)	NHL All-Star Game selection	Brian Leetch (Note: Leetch was voted to the starting lineup, but did not play and was replaced by Poti.)	
League (in-season)	NHL All-Star Game selection	Tom Poti	
Team	Ceil Saidel Memorial Award	Brian Leetch	
Team	Frank Boucher Trophy	Mike Dunham	
Team	Good Guy Award	Bobby Holik	
Team	Lars-Erik Sjoberg Award	Jamie Lundmark	
Team	Players' Player Award	Brian Leetch	
Team	Rangers MVP	Brian Leetch	
Team	Rookie of the Year	Jamie Lundmark	
Team	Steven McDonald Extra Effort Award	Matthew Barnaby	

=== Milestones ===
Milestone	Player	Date	Ref
First game	Jamie Lundmark	October 9, 2002	
First game	John Tripp	January 8, 2003	

== Transactions ==
The Rangers were involved in the following transactions from June 14, 2002, the day after the deciding game of the 2002 Stanley Cup Finals, through June 9, 2003, the day of the deciding game of the 2003 Stanley Cup Finals.

=== Trades ===
Date	Details		Ref
June 22, 2002	To New York Rangers: 3rd-round pick in 2002; 4th-round pick in 2002	To Ottawa Senators: 3rd-round pick in 2002	
June 23, 2002	To New York Rangers: 6th-round pick in 2002	To San Jose Sharks: 6th-round pick in 2003; Future considerations (Note: The Rangers sent San Jose the rights to Theoren Fleury on June 26 to complete the trade.)	
June 23, 2002	To New York Rangers: Krzysztof Oliwa	To Pittsburgh Penguins: Future considerations (Note: 9th-round pick in 2003.)	
June 30, 2002	To New York Rangers: 4th-round pick in 2003	To Edmonton Oilers: Rights to Mike Richter	
July 16, 2002	To New York Rangers: Conditional 6th-round pick in 2003	To Los Angeles Kings: Derek Armstrong	
October 10, 2002	To New York Rangers: Gordie Dwyer	To Tampa Bay Lightning: Boyd Kane	
December 12, 2002	To New York Rangers: Josh Green	To Edmonton Oilers: Conditional draft pick in 2004	
December 12, 2002	To New York Rangers: Mike Dunham	To Nashville Predators: Tomas Kloucek; Rem Murray; Rights to Marek Zidlicky	
January 6, 2003	To New York Rangers: 9th-round pick in 2004	To Boston Bruins: Krzysztof Oliwa	
January 8, 2003	To New York Rangers: Boris Mironov	To Chicago Blackhawks: 4th-round pick in 2004	
January 17, 2003	To New York Rangers: Jay Henderson	To Boston Bruins: Boston's 9th-round pick in 2004	
January 22, 2003	To New York Rangers: 6th-round pick in 2003 or 2004 (Note: The Rangers chose the 2003 pick.)	To Calgary Flames: Mike Mottau	
February 10, 2003	To New York Rangers: Alexei Kovalev; Dan LaCouture; Janne Laukkanen; Mike Wilson	To Pittsburgh Penguins: Joel Bouchard; Rico Fata; Richard Lintner; Mikael Samuelsson; Cash ($3.9 million)	
February 20, 2003	To New York Rangers: Cory Larose	To Minnesota Wild: Jay Henderson	
March 11, 2003	To New York Rangers: Lawrence Nycholat	To Minnesota Wild: Johan Holmqvist	
March 11, 2003	To New York Rangers: Anson Carter; Ales Pisa	To Edmonton Oilers: Cory Cross; Radek Dvorak	

=== Players acquired ===
Date	Player	Former team	Term	Via	Ref
July 1, 2002	Bobby Holik	New Jersey Devils	5-year	Free agency	
July 2, 2002	Darius Kasparaitis	Colorado Avalanche	4-year	Free agency	
July 4, 2002	Mike Richter	Edmonton Oilers	2-year	Free agency	
July 8, 2002	Ted Donato	Los Angeles Kings		Free agency	
July 11, 2002	Jeff State	Merrimack College (HE)		Free agency	
July 11, 2002	Craig Weller	Kootenay Ice (WHL)		Free agency	
July 18, 2002	Vladimir Chebaturkin	Chicago Blackhawks		Free agency	
August 7, 2002	Joel Bouchard	New Jersey Devils		Free agency	
October 1, 2002	Dixon Ward	SCL Tigers (NLA)		Free agency	
October 4, 2002	Ronald Petrovicky	Calgary Flames		Waiver draft	
December 16, 2002	Billy Tibbetts	Hartford Wolf Pack (AHL)		Free agency	
December 17, 2002	Cory Cross	Toronto Maple Leafs		Free agency	
April 4, 2003	Lucas Lawson	University of Maine (HE)		Free agency	
May 22, 2003	Steve MacIntyre	Muskegon Fury (UHL)		Free agency	
May 22, 2003	Jed Ortmeyer	University of Michigan (CCHA)		Free agency	

=== Players lost ===
Date	Player	New team	Via (Note: In parentheses is the player's free agency group on July 1 if applicable.)	Ref
June 30, 2002	Kyle Freadrich		Retirement (UFA)	
July 10, 2002	Terry Virtue	Worcester IceCats (AHL)	Free agency (VI)	
July 12, 2002	Steve McKenna	Pittsburgh Penguins	Free agency (UFA)	
July 16, 2002	Michal Grosek	Boston Bruins	Free agency (UFA)	
July 23, 2002	Jason Dawe	St. Louis Blues	Free agency (UFA)	
August 1, 2002	Brad Smyth	Ottawa Senators	Free agency (UFA)	
August 13, 2002	Bryan Berard	Boston Bruins	Free agency (UFA)	
August 19, 2002	Christian Gosselin	Bracknell Bees (BISL)	Free agency (VI)	
September 6, 2002	Andreas Johansson	Nashville Predators	Free agency (UFA)	
October 9, 2002	Chris St. Croix	Manitoba Moose (AHL)	Free agency (UFA)	
October 25, 2002	Martin Rucinsky	St. Louis Blues	Free agency (III)	
November 16, 2002	Wes Jarvis	Charlotte Checkers (ECHL)	Free agency (UFA)	
December 18, 2002	Sean Gagnon	San Antonio Rampage (AHL)	Free agency (VI)	
January 15, 2003	Josh Green	Washington Capitals	Waivers	
February 21, 2003	Gordie Dwyer	Montreal Canadiens	Waivers	
March 11, 2003	Janne Laukkanen	Tampa Bay Lightning	Waivers	

=== Signings ===
Date	Player	Term	Contract type	Ref
July 9, 2002	Nils Ekman		Re-signing	
July 15, 2002	Ken Gernander		Re-signing	
July 17, 2002	Krzysztof Oliwa		Re-signing	
July 19, 2002	Dale Purinton		Re-signing	
July 30, 2002	Richard Lintner		Re-signing	
August 1, 2002	Mikael Samuelsson	2-year	Re-signing	
August 12, 2002	Johan Holmqvist		Re-signing	
August 13, 2002	Brandon Snee		Entry-level	
August 14, 2002	Roman Lyashenko		Re-signing	
August 14, 2002	Tom Poti		Re-signing	
September 11, 2002	Mark Messier		Re-signing	
September 12, 2002	Radek Dvorak		Re-signing	
September 12, 2002	Scott Meyer		Re-signing	
September 17, 2002	Patrick Aufiero		Entry-level	
September 18, 2002	Mike Mottau		Re-signing	
October 7, 2002	Garth Murray		Entry-level	
December 19, 2002	Bryce Lampman		Entry-level	
March 13, 2003	Ken Gernander	1-year	Option exercised	

== Draft picks ==
New York's picks at the 2002 NHL entry draft in Toronto, Ontario, at the Air Canada Centre.

Round	#	Player	Position	Nationality	College/Junior/Club team (League)
2	33	Lee Falardeau	C	United States	Michigan State University (CCHA)
3	81	Marcus Jonasen	LW	Sweden	VIK Västerås IK Jr. (Sweden)
4	127	Nate Guenin	D	United States	Green Bay Gamblers (USHL)
5	143	Mike Walsh	LW	United States	Detroit Compuware Ambassadors (NAHL)
6	177	Jake Taylor	D	United States	Green Bay Gamblers (USHL)
6	194	Kim Hirschovits	C	Finland	HIFK (FNL)
7	226	Joey Crabb	RW	United States	Green Bay Gamblers (USHL)
8	240	Petr Prucha	LW	Czech Republic	HC Pardubice (Czech Extraliga)
9	270	Rob Flynn	RW	United States	Harvard University (ECAC)
