= 2002–03 Detroit Red Wings season =

Sports season

2002–03 Detroit Red Wings
- Central Division champions
- Division: 1st Central
- Conference: 2nd Western
- 2002–03 record: 48–20–10–4
- Home record: 28–6–5–2
- Road record: 20–14–5–2
- Goals for: 269
- Goals against: 203

Team information
- General manager: Ken Holland
- Coach: Dave Lewis
- Captain: Steve Yzerman
- Alternate captains: Nicklas Lidstrom; Brendan Shanahan
- Arena: Joe Louis Arena
- Average attendance: 20,058 (100%)
- Minor league affiliates: Grand Rapids Griffins; Toledo Storm

Team leaders
- Goals: Brett Hull (37)
- Assists: Sergei Fedorov (47)
- Points: Sergei Fedorov (83)
- Penalty minutes: Darren McCarty (138)
- Plus/minus: Nicklas Lidstrom (40)
- Wins: Curtis Joseph (34)
- Goals against average: Manny Legace (2.18)

The 2002–03 Detroit Red Wings season was the 77th National Hockey League season in Detroit, Michigan. The Red Wings scored 110 points, winning the Central Division, but just one point behind the Dallas Stars for the Western Conference's first seed.

Coming off their latest Stanley Cup victory, the Red Wings started looking towards the future. Dominik Hasek and Scotty Bowman had retired over the summer and captain Steve Yzerman was out for the first 66 games of the regular season. The weight of the team fell on Sergei Fedorov and veteran Brett Hull, who helped the Red Wings score the most goals of any team in the regular season. As newly acquired goaltender Curtis Joseph held steady in net, two more pieces of the Stanley Cup team would be traded over the course of the year. Maxim Kuznetsov and Sean Avery left in a trade for the Los Angeles Kings' Mathieu Schneider right before the trade deadline in an effort to push the Wings towards the playoffs. However, the moves did not come to complete fruition, as the Wings entered the 2003 playoffs by finding themselves pitted against the seventh-seeded Mighty Ducks of Anaheim. The Mighty Ducks shocked the hockey world when they swept the Red Wings in four games en route to their first ever Stanley Cup Finals appearance.

Three Red Wings were named to the roster for the 2003 All-Star Game: defenceman Nicklas Lidstrom, center Sergei Fedorov and head coach Dave Lewis. It was Lidstrom's seventh appearance at the All-Star Game, Fedorov's sixth and Lewis's first appearance as a coach.

The Red Wings sold out all 41 home games in 2002–03 as 20,058 fans packed Joe Louis Arena for every regular season and playoff game played in Detroit.

== Regular season ==
The Red Wings led the NHL in scoring during the regular season, with 269 goals for, and power-play percentage, at 23.82% (76 for 319). They also tied the Los Angeles Kings, New Jersey Devils and Washington Capitals for fewest short-handed goals allowed, with just four.

=== Season standings ===
Central Division
No.	CR		GP	W	L	T	OTL	GF	GA	Pts
1	2	**Detroit Red Wings**	82	48	20	10	4	269	203	110
2	5	**St. Louis Blues**	82	41	24	11	6	253	222	99
3	9	Chicago Blackhawks	82	30	33	13	6	207	226	79
4	13	Nashville Predators	82	27	35	13	7	183	206	74
5	15	Columbus Blue Jackets	82	29	42	8	3	213	263	69

Note: CR = Conference rank; GP = Games played; W = Wins; L = Losses; T = Ties; OTL = Overtime loss; GF = Goals for; GA = Goals against; Pts = Points
Bolded teams qualified for the playoffs.

Western Conference
R		Div	GP	W	L	T	OTL	GF	GA	Pts
**1**	**Z-** Dallas Stars	**PA**	**82**	**46**	**17**	**15**	**4**	**245**	**169**	111
**2**	**Y-** Detroit Red Wings	**CE**	**82**	**48**	**20**	**10**	**4**	**269**	**203**	110
**3**	**Y-** Colorado Avalanche	**NW**	**82**	**42**	**19**	**13**	**8**	**251**	**194**	105
**4**	**X-** Vancouver Canucks	**NW**	**82**	**45**	**23**	**13**	**1**	**264**	**208**	104
**5**	**X-** St. Louis Blues	**CE**	**82**	**41**	**24**	**11**	**6**	**253**	**222**	99
**6**	**X-** Minnesota Wild	**NW**	**82**	**42**	**29**	**10**	**1**	**198**	**178**	95
**7**	**X-** Mighty Ducks of Anaheim	**PA**	**82**	**40**	**27**	**9**	**6**	**203**	**193**	95
**8**	**X-** Edmonton Oilers	**NW**	**82**	**36**	**26**	**11**	**9**	**231**	**230**	92
8.5
9	Chicago Blackhawks	CE	82	30	33	13	6	207	226	79
10	Los Angeles Kings	PA	82	33	37	6	6	203	221	78
11	Phoenix Coyotes	PA	82	31	35	11	5	204	230	78
12	Calgary Flames	NW	82	29	36	13	4	186	228	75
13	Nashville Predators	CE	82	27	35	13	7	183	206	74
14	San Jose Sharks	PA	82	28	37	9	8	214	239	73
15	Columbus Blue Jackets	CE	82	29	42	8	3	213	263	69

Divisions: PA – Pacific, CE – Central, NW – Northwest

Z – Clinched conference; Y – Clinched division; X – Clinched playoff spot

== Playoffs ==
The Detroit Red Wings ended the 2002–03 regular season as the Western Conference's second seed and played Anaheim in the first round. Anaheim upset Detroit in a four-game sweep. The Mighty Ducks would advance and reach the Stanley Cup Finals, losing in Game 7 to the New Jersey Devils.

== Schedule and results ==
=== Regular season ===
2002–03 regular season
October: 6–3–1–0 (home: 3–1–1–0; road: 3–2–0–0)

Game	Date	Visitor	Score	Home	OT	Decision	Attendance	Record	Pts	Recap
1	October 10	Detroit	6 – 3	San Jose		Joseph	17,496	1–0–0–0	2	W
2	October 12	Detroit	2 – 3	Los Angeles		Joseph	18,177	1–1–0–0	2	L
3	October 13	Detroit	4 – 2	Anaheim		Legace	17,174	2–1–0–0	4	W
4	October 17	Montreal	3 – 2	Detroit		Joseph	20,058	2–2–0–0	4	L
5	October 19	Detroit	5 – 3	Minnesota		Joseph	19,344	3–2–0–0	6	W
6	October 21	Calgary	0 – 4	Detroit		Joseph	20,058	4–2–0–0	8	W
7	October 23	Los Angeles	3 – 3	Detroit	OT	Joseph	20,058	4–2–1–0	9	T
8	October 25	Pittsburgh	3 – 7	Detroit		Legace	20,058	5–2–1–0	11	W
9	October 26	Detroit	1 – 3	Nashville		Joseph	17,113	5–3–1–0	11	L
10	October 29	San Jose	2 – 3	Detroit		Joseph	20,058	6–3–1–0	13	W

November: 6–4–2–1 (home: 4–1–1–1; road: 2–3–1–0)

Game	Date	Visitor	Score	Home	OT	Decision	Attendance	Record	Pts	Recap
11	November 2	Detroit	2 – 5	Ottawa		Joseph	18,210	6–4–1–0	13	L
12	November 3	Dallas	3 – 3	Detroit	OT	Joseph	20,058	6–4–2–0	14	T
13	November 5	Chicago	2 – 0	Detroit		Legace	20,058	6–5–2–0	14	L
14	November 7	Boston	1 – 2	Detroit	OT	Legace	20,058	7–5–2–0	16	W
15	November 12	Nashville	1 – 4	Detroit		Joseph	20,058	8–5–2–0	18	W
16	November 15	Anaheim	1 – 2	Detroit	OT	Joseph	20,058	9–5–2–0	20	W
17	November 16	Detroit	2 – 1	Toronto		Legace	19,110	10–5–2–0	22	W
18	November 19	Detroit	5 – 0	Calgary		Joseph	16,061	11–5–2–0	24	W
19	November 22	Detroit	1 – 4	Vancouver		Legace	18,422	11–6–2–0	24	L
20	November 23	Detroit	1 – 1	Edmonton	OT	Joseph	16,839	11–6–3–0	25	T
21	November 25	Edmonton	5 – 4	Detroit	OT	Legace	20,058	11–6–3–1	26	OTL
22	November 27	New Jersey	2 – 3	Detroit	OT	Joseph	20,058	12–6–3–1	28	W
23	November 29	Detroit	4 – 6	Carolina		Joseph	20,066	12–7–3–1	28	L

December: 10–1–4–0 (home: 7–1–1–0; road: 3–0–3–0)

Game	Date	Visitor	Score	Home	OT	Decision	Attendance	Record	Pts	Recap
24	December 1	Calgary	2 – 4	Detroit		Joseph	20,066	13–7–3–1	30	W
25	December 3	Anaheim	1 – 2	Detroit		Joseph	18,504	14–7–3–1	32	W
26	December 5	Detroit	5 – 3	Phoenix		Joseph	15,189	15–7–3–1	34	W
27	December 6	Detroit	3 – 3	Dallas	OT	Joseph	18,532	15–7–4–1	35	T
28	December 8	St. Louis	3 – 4	Detroit	OT	Joseph	20,058	16–7–4–1	37	W
29	December 12	Minnesota	3 – 2	Detroit		Joseph	20,058	16–8–4–1	37	L
30	December 14	Columbus	4 – 6	Detroit		Joseph	20,058	17–8–4–1	39	W
31	December 17	Detroit	2 – 2	NY Islanders	OT	Legace	14,884	17–8–5–1	40	T
32	December 19	Dallas	1 – 1	Detroit	OT	Legace	20,058	17–8–6–1	41	T
33	December 21	NY Rangers	2 – 3	Detroit		Legace	20,058	18–8–6–1	43	W
34	December 23	Detroit	1 – 0	Columbus		Joseph	18,136	19–8–6–1	45	W
35	December 26	Columbus	2 – 4	Detroit		Joseph	20,058	20–8–6–1	47	W
36	December 28	Detroit	4 – 2	Nashville		Legace	17,113	21–8–6–1	49	W
37	December 29	Detroit	2 – 2	Dallas	OT	Joseph	18,532	21–8–7–1	50	T
38	December 31	St. Louis	1 – 5	Detroit		Joseph	20,058	22–8–7–1	52	W

January: 5–7–1–1 (home: 1–2–1–0; road: 4–5–0–1)

Game	Date	Visitor	Score	Home	OT	Decision	Attendance	Record	Pts	Recap
39	January 3	Phoenix	4 – 1	Detroit		Joseph	20,058	22–9–7–1	52	L
40	January 5	Detroit	4 – 3	Chicago	OT	Joseph	21,295	23–9–7–1	54	W
41	January 7	Detroit	0 – 1	Tampa Bay		Joseph	19,941	23–10–7–1	54	L
42	January 8	Detroit	2 – 1	Florida	OT	Legace	19,250	24–10–7–1	56	W
43	January 11	Detroit	2 – 3	Philadelphia		Joseph	19,654	24–11–7–1	56	L
44	January 13	Chicago	4 – 5	Detroit	OT	Joseph	20,058	25–11–7–1	58	W
45	January 15	Detroit	1 – 4	Chicago		Legace	21,391	25–12–7–1	58	L
46	January 16	Detroit	2 – 4	Colorado		Joseph	18,007	26–12–7–1	60	W
47	January 19	Vancouver	4 – 1	Detroit		Joseph	20,058	26–13–7–1	60	L
48	January 22	Detroit	3 – 4	Edmonton	OT	Joseph	16,839	26–13–7–2	61	OTL
49	January 24	Detroit	5 – 2	Vancouver		Legace	18,422	27–13–7–2	63	W
50	January 25	Detroit	1 – 4	Calgary		Joseph	18,028	27–14–7–2	63	L
51	January 28	Detroit	0 – 1	New Jersey		Legace	16,453	27–15–7–2	63	L
52	January 30	Florida	2 – 2	Detroit	OT	Legace	20,058	27–15–8–2	64	T

February: 7–2–1–1 (home: 5–1–1–1; road: 2–1–0–0)

Game	Date	Visitor	Score	Home	OT	Decision	Attendance	Record	Pts	Recap
53	February 4	Nashville	5 – 5	Detroit	OT	Joseph	20,058	27–15–9–2	65	T
54	February 6	Colorado	1 – 0	Detroit		Joseph	20,058	27–16–9–2	65	L
55	February 8	Detroit	3 – 5	Colorado		Joseph	18,007	27–17–9–2	65	L
56	February 10	San Jose	5 – 4	Detroit		Legace	20,058	28–17–9–2	67	W
57	February 13	Buffalo	2 – 4	Detroit		Joseph	20,058	29–17–9–2	69	W
58	February 15	Detroit	6 – 2	Atlanta		Joseph	18,857	30–17–9–2	71	W
59	February 18	Vancouver	4 – 3	Detroit	OT	Joseph	20,058	30–17–9–3	72	OTL
60	February 20	Edmonton	2 – 6	Detroit		Joseph	20,058	31–17–9–3	74	W
61	February 22	Detroit	5 – 1	Washington		Joseph	18,277	32–17–9–3	76	W
62	February 24	Los Angeles	4 – 5	Detroit		Legace	20,058	33–17–9–3	78	W
63	February 27	Toronto	2 – 7	Detroit		Joseph	20,058	34–17–9–3	80	W

March: 13–3–0–0 (home: 7–0–0–0; road: 6–3–0–0)

Game	Date	Visitor	Score	Home	OT	Decision	Attendance	Record	Pts	Recap
64	March 2	Phoenix	2 – 5	Detroit		Joseph	20,058	35–17–9–3	82	W
65	March 3	Detroit	3 – 2	Columbus		Legace	18,136	36–17–9–3	84	W
66	March 5	Tampa Bay	2 – 3	Detroit		Joseph	20,058	37–17–9–3	86	W
67	March 7	St. Louis	2 – 7	Detroit		Joseph	20,058	38–17–9–3	88	W
68	March 9	Detroit	1 – 4	Anaheim		Legace	17,174	38–18–9–3	88	L
69	March 10	Detroit	2 – 3	Los Angeles		Legace	18,344	39–18–9–3	90	W
70	March 12	Detroit	2 – 3	Phoenix		Joseph	15,813	40–18–9–3	92	W
71	March 15	Colorado	3 – 5	Detroit		Joseph	20,058	41–18–9–3	94	W
72	March 16	Ottawa	2 – 6	Detroit		Joseph	20,058	42–18–9–3	96	W
73	March 18	Detroit	5 – 1	Pittsburgh		Legace	13,840	43–18–9–3	98	W
74	March 22	Detroit	4 – 2	St. Louis		Joseph	19,995	44–18–9–3	100	W
75	March 23	Detroit	0 – 4	Minnesota		Legace	18,568	44–19–9–3	100	L
76	March 25	Minnesota	0 – 4	Detroit		Joseph	20,058	45–19–9–3	102	W
77	March 27	Detroit	0 – 3	San Jose		Joseph	17,496	45–20–9–3	102	L
78	March 29	Detroit	6 – 2	St. Louis		Legace	19,951	46–20–9–3	104	W
79	March 31	Nashville	0 – 3	Detroit		Joseph	20,058	47–20–9–3	106	W

April: 1–0–1–1 (home: 1–0–0–0; road: 0–0–1–1)

Game	Date	Visitor	Score	Home	OT	Decision	Attendance	Record	Pts	Recap
80	April 3	NY Islanders	2 – 5	Detroit		Joseph	20,058	48–20–9–3	108	W
81	April 4	Detroit	5 – 5	Columbus	OT	Legace	18,136	48–20–10–3	109	T
82	April 6	Detroit	3 – 4	Chicago	OT	Joseph	21,565	48–20–10–4	110	OTL

Legend: W Win (2 points) L Loss (0 points) T Tie (1 point) OTL Overtime loss (1 point)

=== Playoffs ===
2003 Stanley Cup playoffs
Western Conference Quarterfinals: vs. (7) Mighty Ducks of Anaheim — Anaheim wins 4–0

Game	Date	Visitor	Score	Home	OT	Decision	Attendance	Series	Recap
1	April 10	Anaheim	2 – 1	Detroit	OT	Joseph	20,058	Anaheim leads 1–0	L
2	April 12	Anaheim	3 – 2	Detroit		Joseph	20,058	Anaheim leads 2–0	L
3	April 14	Detroit	1 – 2	Anaheim		Joseph	17,174	Anaheim leads 3–0	L
4	April 16	Detroit	2 – 3	Anaheim	OT	Joseph	17,174	Anaheim wins 4–0	L

Legend: W Win L Loss

== Player statistics ==
=== Scoring ===
- Position abbreviations: C = Center; D = Defense; G = Goaltender; LW = Left wing; RW = Right wing
- † = Joined team via a transaction (e.g., trade, waivers, signing) during the season. Stats reflect time with the Red Wings only.
- ‡ = Left team via a transaction (e.g., trade, waivers, release) during the season. Stats reflect time with the Red Wings only.

No.	Player	Pos	Regular season						Playoffs					
No.	Player	Pos	GP	G	A	Pts	+/-	PIM	GP	G	A	Pts	+/-	PIM
91	Sergei Fedorov	C	80	36	47	83	15	52	4	1	2	3	−1	0
17	Brett Hull	RW	82	37	39	76	11	22	4	0	1	1	−4	0
14	Brendan Shanahan	LW	78	30	38	68	5	103	4	1	1	2	−1	4
5	Nicklas Lidstrom	D	82	18	44	62	40	38	4	0	2	2	−1	0
13	Pavel Datsyuk	C	64	12	39	51	20	16	4	0	0	0	−3	0
40	Henrik Zetterberg	LW	79	22	22	44	6	8	4	1	0	1	−4	0
8	Igor Larionov	C	74	10	33	43	−7	48	4	0	1	1	1	0
96	Tomas Holmstrom	LW	74	20	20	40	11	62	4	1	1	2	1	4
18	Kirk Maltby	LW	82	14	23	37	17	91	4	0	0	0	−2	4
33	Kris Draper	C	82	14	21	35	6	82	4	0	0	0	−2	4
20	Luc Robitaille	LW	81	11	20	31	4	50	4	1	0	1	1	0
25	Darren McCarty	RW	73	13	9	23	10	138	4	0	0	0	−3	6
15	Jason Woolley†	D	62	6	17	23	12	22	4	1	0	1	−2	0
11	Mathieu Dandenault	D	74	4	15	19	25	64	4	0	0	0	−1	2
24	Chris Chelios	D	66	2	17	19	4	78	4	0	0	0	−3	2
21	Boyd Devereaux	C	61	3	9	12	4	16	—	—	—	—	—	—
55	Dmitri Bykov	D	71	2	10	12	1	43	4	0	0	0	−2	0
42	Sean Avery‡	LW	39	5	6	11	7	120	—	—	—	—	—	—
27	Patrick Boileau	D	25	2	6	8	8	14	—	—	—	—	—	—
19	Steve Yzerman	C	16	2	6	8	6	8	4	0	1	1	0	2
23	Mathieu Schneider†	D	13	2	5	7	2	16	4	0	0	0	−4	6
29	Jason Williams	C	16	3	3	6	3	2	—	—	—	—	—	—
2	Jiri Fischer	D	15	1	5	6	0	16	—	—	—	—	—	—
32	Maxim Kuznetsov‡	D	57	0	3	3	0	54	—	—	—	—	—	—
34	Manny Legace	G	25	0	1	1		2	—	—	—	—	—	—
3	Jesse Wallin	D	32	0	1	1	−2	19	—	—	—	—	—	—
31	Curtis Joseph	G	61	0	0	0		4	4	0	0	0		0
23	Stacy Roest	RW	2	0	0	0	0	0	—	—	—	—	—	—

=== Goaltending ===
No.	Player	Regular season										Playoffs								
No.	Player	GP	W	L	T	SA	GA	GAA	SV%	SO	TOI	GP	W	L	SA	GA	GAA	SV%	SO	TOI
31	Curtis Joseph	61	34	19	6	1676	148	2.49	.912	5	3566	4	0	4	120	10	2.08	.917	0	289
34	Manny Legace	25	14	5	4	681	51	2.18	.925	0	1406	—	—	—	—	—	—	—	—	—

== Awards and records ==
=== Awards ===
Type	Award/honor	Recipient	Ref
League (annual)	Bill Masterton Memorial Trophy	Steve Yzerman	
League (annual)	James Norris Memorial Trophy	Nicklas Lidstrom	
League (annual)	King Clancy Memorial Trophy	Brendan Shanahan	
League (annual)	NHL All-Rookie Team	Henrik Zetterberg (Forward)	
League (annual)	NHL First All-Star Team	Nicklas Lidstrom (Defense)	
League (in-season)	NHL All-Star Game selection	Sergei Fedorov	
League (in-season)	NHL All-Star Game selection	Dave Lewis (coach)	
League (in-season)	NHL All-Star Game selection	Nicklas Lidstrom (Note: Lidstrom was voted to the starting lineup, garnering more votes than any other player.)	
League (in-season)	NHL Rookie of the Month	Henrik Zetterberg (February)	

=== Milestones ===
Milestone	Player	Date	Ref
First game	Dmitri Bykov	October 10, 2002	
First game	Henrik Zetterberg	October 10, 2002	
700th goal	Brett Hull	February 10, 2003	
600th assist	Brett Hull	March 7, 2003	
400th goal	Sergei Fedorov	April 6, 2003	

== Transactions ==
The Red Wings were involved in the following transactions from June 14, 2002, the day after the deciding game of the 2002 Stanley Cup Finals, through June 9, 2003, the day of the deciding game of the 2003 Stanley Cup Finals.

=== Trades ===
Date	Details		Ref
June 22, 2002	To Detroit Red Wings: Boston's 3rd-round pick in 2002	To Nashville Predators: 3rd-round pick in 2003	
September 11, 2002	To Detroit Red Wings: Future considerations	To Calgary Flames: Ladislav Kohn	
November 16, 2002	To Detroit Red Wings: Jason Woolley	To Buffalo Sabres: Future considerations	
March 11, 2003	To Detroit Red Wings: Mathieu Schneider	To Los Angeles Kings: Sean Avery; Maxim Kuznetsov; 1st-round pick in 2003; 2nd-round pick in 2004	

=== Players acquired ===
Date	Player	Former team	Term	Via	Ref
July 2, 2002	Curtis Joseph	Calgary Flames	3-year	Free agency	
July 24, 2002	Derek King	Munich Barons (DEL)		Free agency	
July 24, 2002	Michel Picard	Adler Mannheim (DEL)		Free agency	
August 5, 2002	Bryan Adams	Atlanta Thrashers		Free agency	
August 5, 2002	Patrick Boileau	Washington Capitals		Free agency	
August 5, 2002	Ed Campbell	St. Louis Blues		Free agency	
August 5, 2002	Marc Lamothe	Hamilton Bulldogs (AHL)		Free agency	
August 5, 2002	Mark Mowers	Nashville Predators		Free agency	
August 12, 2002	Danny Groulx	Victoriaville Tigres (QMJHL)		Free agency	
August 27, 2002	Stacy Roest	Minnesota Wild		Free agency	
August 29, 2002	Darryl Bootland	Toronto St. Michael's Majors (OHL)	3-year	Free agency	
August 29, 2002	Matt Ellis	Toronto St. Michael's Majors (OHL)	3-year	Free agency	
October 12, 2002	Nathan Robinson	Belleville Bulls (OHL)		Free agency	

=== Players lost ===
Date	Player	New team	Via (Note: In parentheses is the player's free agency group on July 1 if applicable.)	Ref
June 25, 2002	Dominik Hasek		Retirement	
July 9, 2002	Dwayne Zinger	Washington Capitals	Free agency (VI)	
July 12, 2002	Fredrik Olausson	Anaheim Mighty Ducks	Free agency (III)	
July 16, 2002	Jason Elliott	HC TPS (Liiga)	Free agency (VI)	
July 19, 2002	Uwe Krupp	Atlanta Thrashers	Free agency (III)	
July 22, 2002	Steve Brule	Colorado Avalanche	Free agency (VI)	
August 15, 2002	Ryan Gaucher	Cincinnati Cyclones (ECHL)	Free agency (UFA)	
August 22, 2002	Josh DeWolf	Anaheim Mighty Ducks	Free agency (UFA)	
September 2, 2002	John Wikstrom	Bodens IK (Allsvenskan)	Free agency (UFA)	
September 3, 2002	Bruce Richardson	Louisiana IceGators (ECHL)	Free agency (UFA)	
September 9, 2002	Jiri Slegr	HC Litvinov (ELH)	Free agency (III)	
October 20, 2002	Steve Duchesne		Retirement (III)	
March 14, 2003	Stacy Roest	SC Rapperswil-Jona (NLA)	Free agency (Note: Contract for the 2003–04 season. Roest remained with Grand Rapids through the end of the 2003 Calder Cup playoffs.)	

=== Signings ===
Date	Player	Term	Contract type	Ref
July 3, 2002	Chris Chelios	2-year	Re-signing	
July 11, 2002	Mathieu Dandenault	1-year	Re-signing	
July 16, 2002	Dmitri Bykov	1-year	Entry-level	
August 1, 2002	Igor Larionov	1-year	Re-signing	
September 3, 2002	Jiri Fischer	2-year	Re-signing	
September 12, 2002	Jesse Wallin		Re-signing	
September 13, 2002	Darren McCarty	1-year	Re-signing	
December 13, 2002	Kirk Maltby	4-year	Extension	
March 28, 2003	Brett Hull	1-year	Extension	

== Draft picks ==
Detroit's picks at the 2002 NHL entry draft at the Air Canada Centre in Toronto. The Red Wings were slated to pick 30th overall but traded their first pick to the Atlanta Thrashers.

Round	#	Player	Nationality	College/Junior/Club team (League)
2	58	Jiri Hudler (C)	Czech Republic	HC Vsetin (Czech Extraliga)
2	63	Tomas Fleischmann (LW)	Czech Republic	HC Vitkovice (Czech Extraliga)
3	95	Valtteri Filppula (C)	Finland	Jokerit (SM-liiga)
4	131	Johan Berggren (D)	Sweden	Sunne (SWE)
5	166	Logan Koopmans (G)	Canada	Lethbridge Hurricanes (WHL)
6	197	Jimmy Cuddihy (C)	Canada	Shawinigan Cataractes (QMJHL)
7	229	Derek Meech (D)	Canada	Red Deer Rebels (WHL)
8	260	Pierre-Olivier Beaulieu (D)	Canada	Quebec Remparts (QMJHL)
9	262	Christian Soderstrom (LW)	Sweden	Timra IK (SWE)
9	291	Jonathan Ericsson (D)	Sweden	Sodertalje SK (SWE)

== Farm teams ==
=== Grand Rapids Griffins ===
The Griffins were Detroit's top affiliate in the American Hockey League in 2002–03.

=== Toledo Storm ===
The Storm were the Red Wings' ECHL affiliate for the 2002–03 season.

== See also ==
- 2002–03 NHL season
