= 2002–03 Nashville Predators season =

Professional ice hockey team season

2002–03 Nashville Predators
- Division: 4th Central
- Conference: 13th Western
- 2002–03 record: 27–35–13–7
- Home record: 18–17–5–1
- Road record: 9–18–8–6
- Goals for: 183
- Goals against: 206

Team information
- General manager: David Poile
- Coach: Barry Trotz
- Captain: Greg Johnson; Scott Walker (interim)
- Alternate captains: Brent Gilchrist (road); Bill Houlder (road); Kimmo Timonen (home); Scott Walker (home)
- Arena: Gaylord Entertainment Center
- Average attendance: 13,228
- Minor league affiliates: Milwaukee Admirals; Toledo Storm

Team leaders
- Goals: Andreas Johansson (20)
- Assists: Kimmo Timonen (34)
- Points: David Legwand (48)
- Penalty minutes: Cale Hulse (121)
- Plus/minus: Jason York (+13)
- Wins: Tomas Vokoun (25)
- Goals against average: Tomas Vokoun (2.20)

The 2002–03 Nashville Predators season was the Nashville Predators' 5th season in the National Hockey League (NHL). The Predators missed the playoffs for the fifth consecutive year. This would be the last time the Preds finished with a losing record until 2012-13, and their last in a full, 82-game season until 2024-25.

== Off-season ==
Greg Johnson was named team captain on October 8. In addition to being an alternate captain for home games, Scott Walker was briefly interim captain during Johnson's absence due to injury during the season.

== Regular season ==
The Predators tied the Calgary Flames, Minnesota Wild and Pittsburgh Penguins for most times shut out, with 10, and tied the Montreal Canadiens for fewest short-handed goals scored, with 2.

=== Final standings ===
Central Division
No.	CR		GP	W	L	T	OTL	GF	GA	Pts
1	2	**Detroit Red Wings**	82	48	20	10	4	269	203	110
2	5	**St. Louis Blues**	82	41	24	11	6	253	222	99
3	9	Chicago Blackhawks	82	30	33	13	6	207	226	79
4	13	Nashville Predators	82	27	35	13	7	183	206	74
5	15	Columbus Blue Jackets	82	29	42	8	3	213	263	69

Note: CR = Conference rank; GP = Games played; W = Wins; L = Losses; T = Ties; OTL = Overtime loss; GF = Goals for; GA = Goals against; Pts = Points
Bolded teams qualified for the playoffs.

Western Conference
R		Div	GP	W	L	T	OTL	GF	GA	Pts
**1**	**Z-** Dallas Stars	**PA**	**82**	**46**	**17**	**15**	**4**	**245**	**169**	111
**2**	**Y-** Detroit Red Wings	**CE**	**82**	**48**	**20**	**10**	**4**	**269**	**203**	110
**3**	**Y-** Colorado Avalanche	**NW**	**82**	**42**	**19**	**13**	**8**	**251**	**194**	105
**4**	**X-** Vancouver Canucks	**NW**	**82**	**45**	**23**	**13**	**1**	**264**	**208**	104
**5**	**X-** St. Louis Blues	**CE**	**82**	**41**	**24**	**11**	**6**	**253**	**222**	99
**6**	**X-** Minnesota Wild	**NW**	**82**	**42**	**29**	**10**	**1**	**198**	**178**	95
**7**	**X-** Mighty Ducks of Anaheim	**PA**	**82**	**40**	**27**	**9**	**6**	**203**	**193**	95
**8**	**X-** Edmonton Oilers	**NW**	**82**	**36**	**26**	**11**	**9**	**231**	**230**	92
8.5
9	Chicago Blackhawks	CE	82	30	33	13	6	207	226	79
10	Los Angeles Kings	PA	82	33	37	6	6	203	221	78
11	Phoenix Coyotes	PA	82	31	35	11	5	204	230	78
12	Calgary Flames	NW	82	29	36	13	4	186	228	75
13	Nashville Predators	CE	82	27	35	13	7	183	206	74
14	San Jose Sharks	PA	82	28	37	9	8	214	239	73
15	Columbus Blue Jackets	CE	82	29	42	8	3	213	263	69

Divisions: PA – Pacific, CE – Central, NW – Northwest

Z – Clinched conference; Y – Clinched division; X – Clinched playoff spot

== Schedule and results ==
2002–03 regular season
October: 1–5–1–2 (home: 1–3–0–0; road: 0–2–1–2)

Game	Date	Score	Opponent	Record	Recap
1	October 11, 2002	4–5	@ Washington Capitals (2002–03)	0–1–0–0	L
2	October 12, 2002	2–3	Edmonton Oilers (2002–03)	0–2–0–0	L
3	October 15, 2002	3–4 OT	@ New York Islanders (2002–03)	0–2–0–1	OTL
4	October 18, 2002	2–3 OT	@ New Jersey Devils (2002–03)	0–2–0–2	OTL
5	October 19, 2002	2–2 OT	@ New York Rangers (2002–03)	0–2–1–2	T
6	October 22, 2002	1–2	Phoenix Coyotes (2002–03)	0–3–1–2	L
7	October 24, 2002	1–2	San Jose Sharks (2002–03)	0–4–1–2	L
8	October 26, 2002	3–1	Detroit Red Wings (2002–03)	1–4–1–2	W
9	October 30, 2002	0–7	@ St. Louis Blues (2002–03)	1–5–1–2	L

November: 3–6–3–2 (home: 2–2–1–0; road: 1–4–2–2)

Game	Date	Score	Opponent	Record	Recap
10	November 2, 2002	5–6 OT	@ Los Angeles Kings (2002–03)	1–5–1–3	OTL
11	November 3, 2002	1–2 OT	@ Phoenix Coyotes (2002–03)	1–5–1–4	OTL
12	November 6, 2002	1–2	@ Mighty Ducks of Anaheim (2002–03)	1–6–1–4	L
13	November 7, 2002	2–2 OT	@ San Jose Sharks (2002–03)	1–6–2–4	T
14	November 10, 2002	4–3	@ Colorado Avalanche (2002–03)	2–6–2–4	W
15	November 12, 2002	1–4	@ Detroit Red Wings (2002–03)	2–7–2–4	L
16	November 14, 2002	1–3	Colorado Avalanche (2002–03)	2–8–2–4	L
17	November 16, 2002	1–1 OT	Columbus Blue Jackets (2002–03)	2–8–3–4	T
18	November 17, 2002	2–4	@ Chicago Blackhawks (2002–03)	2–9–3–4	L
19	November 21, 2002	1–1 OT	@ Colorado Avalanche (2002–03)	2–9–4–4	T
20	November 23, 2002	2–4	@ Minnesota Wild (2002–03)	2–10–4–4	L
21	November 27, 2002	4–2	San Jose Sharks (2002–03)	3–10–4–4	W
22	November 29, 2002	1–2	New Jersey Devils (2002–03)	3–11–4–4	L
23	November 30, 2002	5–2	Dallas Stars (2002–03)	4–11–4–4	W

December: 6–6–2–0 (home: 3–5–1–0; road: 3–1–1–0)

Game	Date	Score	Opponent	Record	Recap
24	December 3, 2002	1–2	Carolina Hurricanes (2002–03)	4–12–4–4	L
25	December 5, 2002	3–2	@ Los Angeles Kings (2002–03)	5–12–4–4	W
26	December 7, 2002	4–2	@ San Jose Sharks (2002–03)	6–12–4–4	W
27	December 8, 2002	0–3	@ Mighty Ducks of Anaheim (2002–03)	6–13–4–4	L
28	December 10, 2002	0–3	Los Angeles Kings (2002–03)	6–14–4–4	L
29	December 12, 2002	2–2 OT	St. Louis Blues (2002–03)	6–14–5–4	T
30	December 14, 2002	3–1	Minnesota Wild (2002–03)	7–14–5–4	W
31	December 17, 2002	0–3	Calgary Flames (2002–03)	7–15–5–4	L
32	December 19, 2002	1–3	Vancouver Canucks (2002–03)	7–16–5–4	L
33	December 21, 2002	2–2 OT	@ Tampa Bay Lightning (2002–03)	7–16–6–4	T
34	December 23, 2002	3–2 OT	@ Florida Panthers (2002–03)	8–16–6–4	W
35	December 26, 2002	3–1	Dallas Stars (2002–03)	9–16–6–4	W
36	December 28, 2002	2–4	Detroit Red Wings (2002–03)	9–17–6–4	L
37	December 30, 2002	3–2	Ottawa Senators (2002–03)	10–17–6–4	W

January: 7–6–2–0 (home: 4–2–1–0; road: 3–4–1–0)

Game	Date	Score	Opponent	Record	Recap
38	January 1, 2003	3–7	Colorado Avalanche (2002–03)	10–18–6–4	L
39	January 4, 2003	3–3 OT	Chicago Blackhawks (2002–03)	10–18–7–4	T
40	January 6, 2003	5–1	@ Columbus Blue Jackets (2002–03)	11–18–7–4	W
41	January 7, 2003	2–1 OT	St. Louis Blues (2002–03)	12–18–7–4	W
42	January 11, 2003	4–3 OT	Phoenix Coyotes (2002–03)	13–18–7–4	W
43	January 12, 2003	0–2	@ Chicago Blackhawks (2002–03)	13–19–7–4	L
44	January 14, 2003	3–4	@ Vancouver Canucks (2002–03)	13–20–7–4	L
45	January 16, 2003	2–2 OT	@ Calgary Flames (2002–03)	13–20–8–4	T
46	January 18, 2003	3–2 OT	@ Edmonton Oilers (2002–03)	14–20–8–4	W
47	January 21, 2003	3–2	Vancouver Canucks (2002–03)	15–20–8–4	W
48	January 23, 2003	2–4	New York Rangers (2002–03)	15–21–8–4	L
49	January 25, 2003	3–2	Tampa Bay Lightning (2002–03)	16–21–8–4	W
50	January 27, 2003	5–1	@ Buffalo Sabres (2002–03)	17–21–8–4	W
51	January 28, 2003	1–2	@ Boston Bruins (2002–03)	17–22–8–4	L
52	January 30, 2003	1–2	@ Columbus Blue Jackets (2002–03)	17–23–8–4	L

February: 8–2–1–0 (home: 7–1–0–0; road: 1–1–1–0)

Game	Date	Score	Opponent	Record	Recap
53	February 4, 2003	5–5 OT	@ Detroit Red Wings (2002–03)	17–23–9–4	T
54	February 8, 2003	3–2	Columbus Blue Jackets (2002–03)	18–23–9–4	W
55	February 11, 2003	2–3	Los Angeles Kings (2002–03)	18–24–9–4	L
56	February 13, 2003	2–0	New York Islanders (2002–03)	19–24–9–4	W
57	February 15, 2003	2–1	Mighty Ducks of Anaheim (2002–03)	20–24–9–4	W
58	February 17, 2003	5–1	Boston Bruins (2002–03)	21–24–9–4	W
59	February 20, 2003	4–1	Calgary Flames (2002–03)	22–24–9–4	W
60	February 22, 2003	0–4	@ Ottawa Senators (2002–03)	22–25–9–4	L
61	February 23, 2003	5–2	@ Toronto Maple Leafs (2002–03)	23–25–9–4	W
62	February 25, 2003	5–0	Columbus Blue Jackets (2002–03)	24–25–9–4	W
63	February 27, 2003	6–0	Pittsburgh Penguins (2002–03)	25–25–9–4	W

March: 2–8–4–2 (home: 1–4–2–0; road: 1–4–2–2)

Game	Date	Score	Opponent	Record	Recap
64	March 1, 2003	5–4 OT	Chicago Blackhawks (2002–03)	26–25–9–4	W
65	March 4, 2003	1–2 OT	@ St. Louis Blues (2002–03)	26–25–9–5	OTL
66	March 6, 2003	2–2 OT	Minnesota Wild (2002–03)	26–25–10–5	T
67	March 7, 2003	2–1	@ Dallas Stars (2002–03)	27–25–10–5	W
68	March 10, 2003	1–3	Montreal Canadiens (2002–03)	27–26–10–5	L
69	March 12, 2003	2–2 OT	@ Pittsburgh Penguins (2002–03)	27–26–11–5	T
70	March 14, 2003	1–3	@ Minnesota Wild (2002–03)	27–27–11–5	L
71	March 15, 2003	0–1	St. Louis Blues (2002–03)	27–28–11–5	L
72	March 17, 2003	3–5	Edmonton Oilers (2002–03)	27–29–11–5	L
73	March 20, 2003	3–7	@ Vancouver Canucks (2002–03)	27–30–11–5	L
74	March 22, 2003	1–1 OT	@ Calgary Flames (2002–03)	27–30–12–5	T
75	March 23, 2003	2–3 OT	@ Edmonton Oilers (2002–03)	27–30–12–6	OTL
76	March 25, 2003	1–1 OT	Philadelphia Flyers (2002–03)	27–30–13–6	T
77	March 27, 2003	1–4	@ Chicago Blackhawks (2002–03)	27–31–13–6	L
78	March 29, 2003	2–3	Atlanta Thrashers (2002–03)	27–32–13–6	L
79	March 31, 2003	0–3	@ Detroit Red Wings (2002–03)	27–33–13–6	L

April: 0–2–0–1 (home: 0–0–0–1; road: 0–2–0–0)

Game	Date	Score	Opponent	Record	Recap
80	April 1, 2003	1–2 OT	Mighty Ducks of Anaheim (2002–03)	27–33–13–7	OTL
81	April 4, 2003	0–1	@ Phoenix Coyotes (2002–03)	27–34–13–7	L
82	April 6, 2003	0–2	@ Dallas Stars (2002–03)	27–35–13–7	L

Legend: W Win (2 points) L Loss (0 points) T Tie (1 point) OTL Overtime loss (1 point)

== Player statistics ==
=== Scoring ===
- Position abbreviations: C = Center; D = Defense; G = Goaltender; LW = Left wing; RW = Right wing
- † = Joined team via a transaction (e.g., trade, waivers, signing) during the season. Stats reflect time with the Predators only.
- ‡ = Left team via a transaction (e.g., trade, waivers, release) during the season. Stats reflect time with the Predators only.

No.	Player	Pos	Regular season					
No.	Player	Pos	GP	G	A	Pts	+/-	PIM
11	David Legwand	C	64	17	31	48	−2	34
44	Kimmo Timonen	D	72	6	34	40	−3	46
21	Andreas Johansson	C	56	20	17	37	−4	22
25	Denis Arkhipov	C	79	11	24	35	−18	32
5	Andy Delmore	D	71	18	16	34	−17	28
17	Scott Hartnell	LW	82	12	22	34	−3	101
24	Scott Walker	RW	60	15	18	33	2	58
33	Vladimir Orszagh	RW	78	16	16	32	−1	38
18	Adam Hall	RW	79	16	12	28	−8	31
43	Vitali Yachmenev	LW	62	5	15	20	7	12
15	Rem Murray†	LW	53	6	13	19	1	18
27	Jason York†	D	74	4	15	19	13	52
22	Greg Johnson	C	38	8	9	17	7	22
10	Clarke Wilm	C	82	5	11	16	−11	36
3	Karlis Skrastins	D	82	3	10	13	−18	44
16	Denis Pederson	RW	43	4	6	10	2	39
4	Mark Eaton	D	50	2	7	9	1	22
32	Cale Hulse	D	80	2	6	8	−11	121
19	Martin Erat	RW	27	1	7	8	−9	14
38	Vernon Fiddler	C	19	4	2	6	2	14
23	Bill Houlder	D	82	2	4	6	−2	46
14 (Note: Petrov wore number 20 in his first three games.)	Oleg Petrov†	RW	17	2	2	4	−4	2
41	Brent Gilchrist	LW	41	1	2	3	−11	14
14	Jon Sim†‡	LW	4	1	0	1	0	0
46	Wyatt Smith	C	11	1	0	1	−1	0
7	Scottie Upshall	LW	8	1	0	1	2	0
34	Wade Flaherty†	G	1	0	1	1		0
12	Reid Simpson†	LW	26	0	1	1	−4	56
29	Tomas Vokoun	G	69	0	1	1		28
20	Todd Warriner†	LW	6	0	1	1	−1	4
26	Andrew Berenzweig‡	D	4	0	0	0	0	0
51	Francis Bouillon‡	D	4	0	0	0	−1	2
9	Greg Classen	C	8	0	0	0	−3	4
1	Mike Dunham‡	G	15	0	0	0		0
31	Brian Finley	G	1	0	0	0		0
54	Darren Haydar	RW	2	0	0	0	−1	0
28	Tomas Kloucek†	D	3	0	0	0	1	2
35	Jan Lasak	G	3	0	0	0		0
28	Cameron Mann	RW	4	0	0	0	−2	0
20	Nathan Perrott‡	RW	1	0	0	0	0	5
39	Domenic Pittis	C	2	0	0	0	0	2
36	Robert Schnabel	D	1	0	0	0	0	0
27	Pascal Trepanier‡	D	1	0	0	0	0	0

=== Goaltending ===
- † = Joined team via a transaction (e.g., trade, waivers, signing) during the season. Stats reflect time with the Predators only.
- ‡ = Left team via a transaction (e.g., trade, waivers, release) during the season. Stats reflect time with the Predators only.

No.	Player	Regular season									
No.	Player	GP	W	L	T	SA	GA	GAA	SV%	SO	TOI
29	Tomas Vokoun	69	25	31	11	1771	146	2.20	.918	3	3974
1	Mike Dunham‡	15	2	9	2	397	43	3.15	.892	0	819
35	Jan Lasak	3	0	1	0	39	5	3.33	.872	0	90
31	Brian Finley	1	0	0	0	13	3	3.83	.769	0	47
34	Wade Flaherty†	1	0	1	0	27	4	4.71	.852	0	51

== Awards and records ==
=== Awards ===
Type	Award/honor	Recipient	Ref
League (in-season)	NHL YoungStars Game selection	Adam Hall	

=== Milestones ===
Milestone	Player	Date	Ref
First game	Scottie Upshall	October 15, 2002	
First game	Vernon Fiddler	November 2, 2002	
First game	Darren Haydar	November 17, 2002	
First game	Brian Finley	January 1, 2003	

== Transactions ==
The Predators were involved in the following transactions from June 14, 2002, the day after the deciding game of the 2002 Stanley Cup Finals, through June 9, 2003, the day of the deciding game of the 2003 Stanley Cup Finals.

=== Trades ===
Date	Details		Ref
June 22, 2002	To Nashville Predators: Boston's 3rd-round pick in 2002	To Anaheim Mighty Ducks: Future considerations (Note: Nashville promised not to select Joffrey Lupul with the sixth overall pick in the 2002 draft.)	
June 22, 2002	To Nashville Predators: 3rd-round pick in 2002; 2nd-round pick in 2003	To Buffalo Sabres: 2nd-round pick in 2002	
June 22, 2002	To Nashville Predators: Conditional 3rd-round pick in 2003	To Toronto Maple Leafs: Buffalo's 3rd-round pick in 2002	
June 22, 2002	To Nashville Predators: 3rd-round pick in 2003	To Detroit Red Wings: Boston's 3rd-round pick in 2002	
June 22, 2002	To Nashville Predators: Conditional 3rd-round pick in 2003	To Washington Capitals: Rights to Petr Sykora	
June 29, 2002	To Nashville Predators: Rights to Ed Belfour; Rights to Cameron Mann	To Dallas Stars: David Gosselin; 5th-round pick in 2003	
June 30, 2002	To Nashville Predators: Rights to Tie Domi	To Toronto Maple Leafs: 8th-round pick in 2003	
October 23, 2002	To Nashville Predators: Jason York	To Anaheim Mighty Ducks: Future considerations	
December 12, 2002	To Nashville Predators: Tomas Kloucek; Rem Murray; Rights to Marek Zidlicky	To New York Rangers: Mike Dunham	
December 31, 2002	To Nashville Predators: Bob Wren	To Toronto Maple Leafs: Nathan Perrott	
February 4, 2003	To Nashville Predators: Future considerations	To Los Angeles Kings: Greg Koehler	
February 17, 2003	To Nashville Predators: Jon Sim	To Dallas Stars: Andrew Berenzweig; Conditional draft pick in 2004	
March 3, 2003	To Nashville Predators: Oleg Petrov	To Montreal Canadiens: 4th-round pick in 2003	
March 9, 2003	To Nashville Predators: Wade Flaherty	To Florida Panthers: Pascal Trepanier	
March 10, 2003	To Nashville Predators: Future considerations	To Ottawa Senators: Bob Wren	
March 11, 2003	To Nashville Predators: Alexander Riazantsev	To Colorado Avalanche: 7th-round pick in 2003	

=== Players acquired ===
Date	Player	Former team	Term	Via	Ref
July 11, 2002	Brent Gilchrist	Dallas Stars		Free agency	
July 11, 2002	Clarke Wilm	Calgary Flames		Free agency	
July 15, 2002	Greg Koehler	Philadelphia Flyers		Free agency	
July 15, 2002	Wyatt Smith	Phoenix Coyotes		Free agency	
July 16, 2002	Pascal Trepanier	Colorado Avalanche		Free agency	
July 24, 2002	Denis Pederson	Phoenix Coyotes		Free agency	
July 24, 2002	Domenic Pittis	Edmonton Oilers	2-year	Free agency	
September 6, 2002	Andreas Johansson	New York Rangers		Free agency	
October 4, 2002	Francis Bouillon	Montreal Canadiens		Waiver draft	
December 3, 2002	Reid Simpson	Milwaukee Admirals (AHL)		Free agency	
March 11, 2003	Todd Warriner	Philadelphia Flyers		Waivers	

=== Players lost ===
Date	Player	New team	Via (Note: In parentheses is the player's free agency group on July 1 if applicable.)	Ref
June 20, 2002	Pavel Skrbek	Lulea HF (SHL)	Free agency (II) (Note: Nashville retained Skrbek’s NHL rights through the 2006–07 season.)	
July 1, 2002	Jay Legault (Note: Legault was inactive during the 2002–03 season.)		Contract expiration (UFA)	
July 2, 2002	Ed Belfour	Toronto Maple Leafs	Free agency (III)	
July 12, 2002	Tie Domi	Toronto Maple Leafs	Free agency (III)	
July 16, 2002	Steve Dubinsky	St. Louis Blues	Free agency (III)	
July 17, 2002	Brett Hauer	Geneve-Servette HC (NLA) (Note: Hauer signed with Geneve-Servette HC on July 20.)	Release	
July 18, 2002	Bill Bowler	Boston Bruins	Free agency (UFA)	
July 19, 2002	Petr Sachl	Porin Assat (Liiga)	Free agency (UFA)	
July 22, 2002	Marian Cisar	HC Znojemsti Orli (ELH)	Free agency (II) (Note: Nashville retained Cisar’s NHL rights through the 2006–07 season.)	
August 4, 2002	Petr Hubacek	HC Zlin (ELH)	Free agency (Note: Nashville retained Hubacek’s NHL rights through the 2007–08 season.)	
August 5, 2002	Mark Mowers	Detroit Red Wings	Free agency (UFA)	
August 13, 2002	Jukka Hentunen	Jokerit (Liiga)	Free agency (II) (Note: Nashville retained Hentunen’s NHL rights through the 2005–06 season.)	
August 22, 2002	Chris Mason	Florida Panthers	Free agency (VI)	
August 22, 2002	Steve Parsons	Providence Bruins (AHL)	Free agency (UFA)	
August 28, 2002	Jeremy Stevenson	Houston Aeros (AHL)	Free agency (VI)	
October 4, 2002	Petr Tenkrat	Florida Panthers	Waiver draft	
October 9, 2002	Marty Wilford	Norfolk Admirals (AHL)	Free agency (VI)	
October 25, 2002	Francis Bouillon	Montreal Canadiens	Waivers	
November 15, 2002	Reid Simpson	Milwaukee Admirals (AHL)	Free agency (III)	
March 8, 2003	Jon Sim	Los Angeles Kings	Waivers	
March 18, 2003	Cameron Mann	ERC Ingolstadt (DEL)	Free agency (Note: Contract for the 2003–04 season. Mann remained with Milwaukee through the end of the 2003 Calder Cup playoffs.)	
March 27, 2003	Jere Karalahti	HIFK (Liiga)	Free agency	
June 1, 2003	Stu Grimson		Retirement	

=== Signings ===
Date	Player	Term	Contract type	Ref
June 30, 2002	Mike Dunham	1-year	Extension (Note: Contract option for the 2004–05 season was exercised by Nashville.)	
June 30, 2002	Vladimir Orszagh	1-year	Option exercised	
June 30, 2002	Robert Schnabel		Extension	
June 30, 2002	Kimmo Timonen	1-year	Option exercised	
June 30, 2002	Vitali Yachmenev	1-year	Option exercised	
July 7, 2002	Dan Hamhuis		Entry-level	
July 15, 2002	Cameron Mann		Re-signing	
July 17, 2002	Andy Delmore		Re-signing	
July 18, 2002	Cale Hulse		Re-signing	
July 30, 2002	Greg Classen		Re-signing	
July 31, 2002	David Legwand		Re-signing	
July 31, 2002	Bryan Lundbohm		Re-signing	
August 1, 2002	Vladimir Orszagh		Extension	
September 5, 2002	Jan Lasak		Re-signing	
September 5, 2002	Peter Smrek		Re-signing	
September 10, 2002	Darren Haydar		Entry-level	
October 7, 2002	Scottie Upshall		Entry-level	
May 29, 2003	Jordin Tootoo		Entry-level	
May 30, 2003	Oleg Petrov	1-year	Option exercised	

== Draft picks ==
Nashville's draft picks at the 2002 NHL entry draft held at the Air Canada Centre in Toronto, Ontario.

Round	#	Player	Nationality	College/Junior/Club team (League)
1	6	Scottie Upshall	Canada	Kamloops Blazers (WHL)
4	102	Brandon Segal	Canada	Calgary Hitmen (WHL)
5	138	Patrick Jarrett	Canada	Owen Sound Attack (OHL)
6	172	Mike McKenna	United States	St. Lawrence University (ECAC)
7	203	Josh Morrow	Canada	Tri-City Americans (WHL)
8	235	Kaleb Betts	Canada	Chilliwack Chiefs (BCHL)
9	264	Matthew Davis	Canada	Moncton Wildcats (QMJHL)
9	266	Steven Spencer	Canada	Swift Current Broncos (WHL)

== See also ==
- 2002–03 NHL season
