= Harvey the Hound =

Mascot of the Calgary Flames hockey team

Harvey the Hound is the mascot of the National Hockey League's Calgary Flames. Introduced in 1983, Harvey was the first mascot in the NHL.

== History ==
Created and performed by Grant Kelba, Harvey made his debut in 1983 serving as the mascot of the Flames and later as a second mascot for the Calgary Stampeders of the Canadian Football League. His popularity with the Flames was such that many teams contacted Kelba about making mascots for their own teams.

His first game, February 16, 1984 was a Flames rout over the Pittsburgh Penguins, 10–3 at the Olympic Saddledome. Both Lanny McDonald and Doug Risebrough scored hat tricks and ever since Harvey has been a fixture with the Flames. Harvey has remained a mainstay at Flames games, and at many events throughout Calgary and southern Alberta ever since.

Under Kelba's management, Harvey was invited by the NHL to attend 7 All Star Games and tour Japan to promote the NHL over there. Kelba sold Harvey to the Flames in 1996 and stayed on performing until his retirement in 1999.

On January 20, 2003, during a game against the Edmonton Oilers at the Pengrowth Saddledome, Oilers head coach Craig MacTavish ripped Harvey's tongue from his mouth. With the Flames leading 4–0, Harvey was taunting the Oilers behind their bench. Players squirted him with water, and MacTavish eventually reached up and ripped Harvey's tongue from his mouth, tossing it into the crowd. The Oilers scored three goals shortly after, though the Flames held on to win 4–3. After the game, MacTavish preceded with a comment on the incident: "Once we got the tongue out of his mouth, we started to turn things around a little bit. If we scored that last goal to tie it, I was looking for Harvey the Hound." The incident made headlines throughout North America, and led to many jokes, including having many other NHL team mascots arrive at the 2003 All-Star Game with their tongues hanging out.

Harvey also had a long-running, good-natured feud with TSN broadcaster Gary Green, which began in the late eighties when Green was broadcasting for the rival Winnipeg Jets. Whenever Green worked a game at the Saddledome, Harvey would display a sign that mocked the broadcaster in some way, prompting an on-air response from Green that feigned contempt.

=== Community and charity ===
Together with the Healthy Paws Forward Veterinary Hospital, which is the official veterinarian of Calgary's mascots, Harvey launched the Harvey's Hounds pet cutout section in the Saddledome. This allowed patrons to get a picture of their pet in the Dome while supporting a good cause.

== See also ==
- List of NHL mascots
