= Rick Mrozik =

American ice hockey player (born 1975)

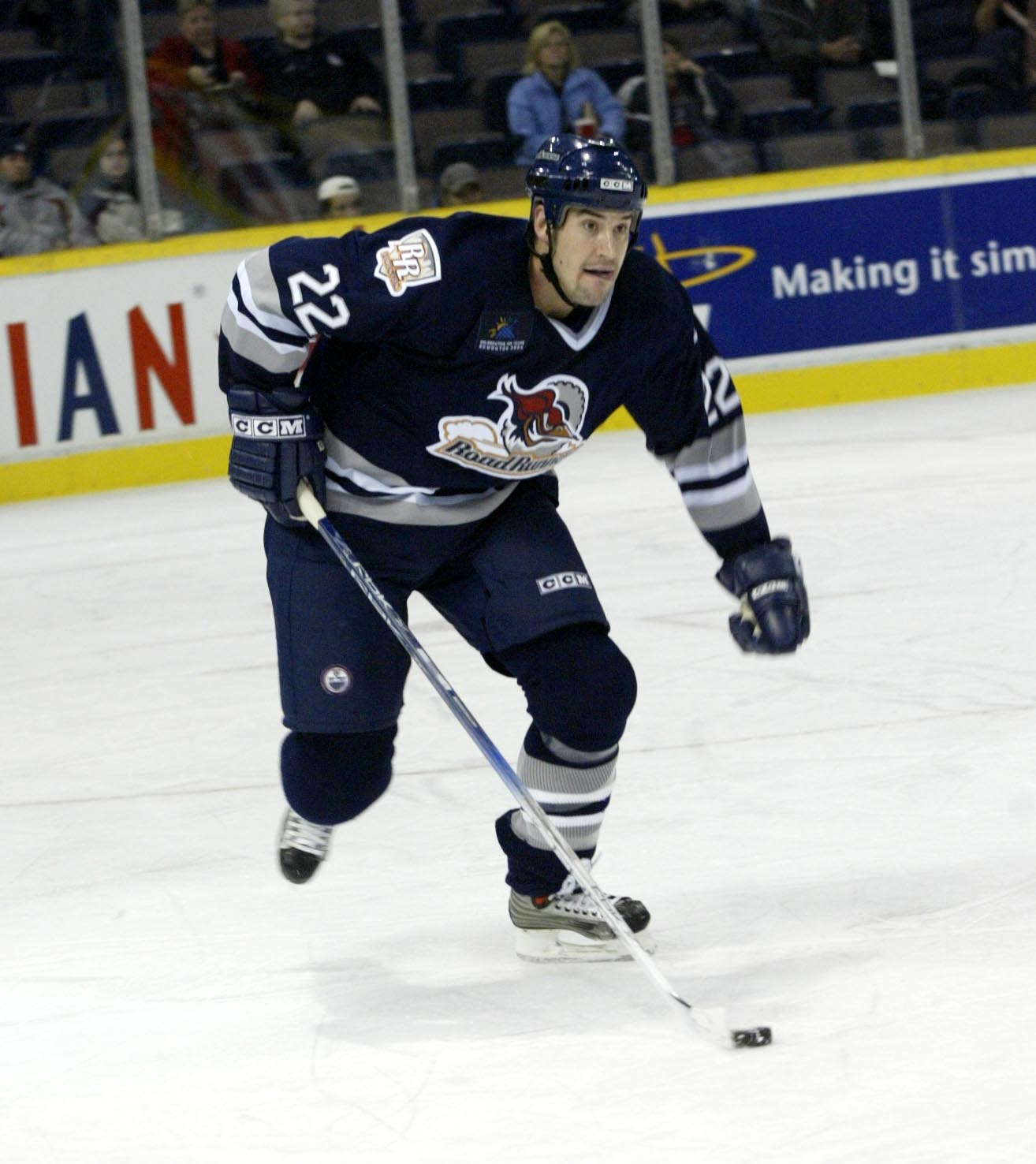
- Mrozik with the Edmonton Road Runners in 2004
- Born: January 2, 1975 (age 51) Duluth, Minnesota, U.S.
- Height: 5 ft 10 in (178 cm)
- Weight: 178 lb (81 kg; 12 st 10 lb)
- Position: Center
- Shot: Left
- Played for: Calgary Flames
- NHL draft: 136th overall, 1993; Dallas Stars
- Playing career: 1993–2005

Richard Donald Mrozik (born January 2, 1975) is an American former professional ice hockey player who played two games in the National Hockey League for the Calgary Flames in 2002–03. Mrozik was drafted by the Dallas Stars in the 6th round, 136th overall, in the 1993 NHL entry draft. He retired following the 2004–05 season after spending eight years in the minor leagues.

Mrozik spent four years at the University of Minnesota Duluth, where he was named a Second Team All-Star by the Western Collegiate Hockey Association in his senior year of 1996–97.

== Career statistics ==
			Regular season					Playoffs
Season	Team	League	GP	G	A	Pts	PIM	GP	G	A	Pts	PIM
1993–94	University of Minnesota Duluth	NCAA	38	2	9	11	38	—	—	—	—	—
1994–95	University of Minnesota Duluth	NCAA	3	0	0	0	2	—	—	—	—	—
1995–96	University of Minnesota Duluth	NCAA	35	3	19	22	63	—	—	—	—	—
1996–97	University of Minnesota Duluth	NCAA	38	11	23	34	56	—	—	—	—	—
1997–98	Portland Pirates	AHL	75	2	15	17	52	10	1	3	4	2
1998–99	Portland Pirates	AHL	70	4	8	12	63	—	—	—	—	—
1999–00	Worcester IceCats	AHL	3	0	0	0	0	—	—	—	—	—
1999–00	Pee Dee Pride	ECHL	60	9	19	28	44	5	2	0	2	6
1999–00	Syracuse Crunch	AHL	1	0	0	0	0	—	—	—	—	—
2000–01	Saint John Flames	AHL	76	5	11	16	26	19	1	1	2	6
2001–02	Saint John Flames	AHL	55	2	5	7	27	—	—	—	—	—
2002–03	Calgary Flames	NHL	2	0	0	0	0	—	—	—	—	—
2002–03	Saint John Flames	AHL	68	2	10	12	46	—	—	—	—	—
2003–04	Rochester Americans	AHL	72	4	10	14	47	15	1	4	5	4
2004–05	Edmonton Road Runners	AHL	68	3	18	21	61	—	—	—	—	—
NHL totals			2	0	0	0	0	—	—	—	—	—
AHL totals			488	22	77	99	322	44	3	8	11	12

== Awards and honors ==
Award	Year
All-WCHA Second Team	1996–97
