= Jesse Fibiger =

Canadian ice hockey player (born 1978)

- Born: April 4, 1978 (age 48) Victoria, British Columbia, Canada
- Height: 6 ft 3 in (191 cm)
- Weight: 220 lb (100 kg; 15 st 10 lb)
- Position: Defence
- Shot: Left
- Played for: San Jose Sharks; EHC Wolfsburg Grizzly Adams
- NHL draft: 178th overall, 1998; Mighty Ducks of Anaheim
- Playing career: 2001–2008

Jesse Fibiger (born April 4, 1978) is a Canadian former professional ice hockey defenceman who played sixteen games with the San Jose Sharks of the National Hockey League during the 2001–02 NHL season. Fibiger was held without a point in those games and registered two penalty minutes. In 2005, Fibiger moved to Germany, signing with EHC Wolfsburg Grizzly Adams.

Born in Victoria, British Columbia, he was originally drafted by the Mighty Ducks of Anaheim, 178th overall in the 1998 NHL entry draft.

== Career statistics ==
			Regular season					Playoffs
Season	Team	League	GP	G	A	Pts	PIM	GP	G	A	Pts	PIM
1996–97	Victoria Salsa	BCHL	53	6	18	24	88	—	—	—	—	—
1997–98	Univ. of Minnesota-Duluth	NCAA	40	3	6	9	82	—	—	—	—	—
1998–99	Univ. of Minnesota-Duluth	NCAA	36	4	16	20	61	—	—	—	—	—
1999–00	Univ. of Minnesota-Duluth	NCAA	37	4	6	10	83	—	—	—	—	—
2000–01	Univ. of Minnesota-Duluth	NCAA	37	0	8	8	56	—	—	—	—	—
2001–02	Cleveland Barons	AHL	79	6	12	18	94	—	—	—	—	—
2002–03	San Jose Sharks	NHL	16	0	0	0	2	—	—	—	—	—
2002–03	Cleveland Barons	AHL	59	3	11	14	63	—	—	—	—	—
2003–04	Cleveland Barons	AHL	55	5	12	17	39	9	0	2	2	8
2004–05	Binghamton Senators	AHL	79	3	19	22	79	6	1	0	1	6
2005–06	Grizzly Adams Wolfsburg	Germany2	44	9	22	31	146	4	0	0	0	33
2006–07	Grizzly Adams Wolfsburg	Germany2	21	1	11	12	47	10	0	2	2	6
2007–08	Grizzly Adams Wolfsburg	DEL	54	4	8	12	60	—	—	—	—	—
NHL totals			16	0	0	0	2	—	—	—	—	—
