= 2003 National Hockey League All-Star Game =

Professional ice hockey exhibition game

2003 NHL All-Star Game
	1	2	3	OT	Total
West	3	1	1	1	6
East	2	2	1	0	5
- Date: February 2, 2003
- Arena: Office Depot Center
- City: Sunrise
- MVP: Dany Heatley (Atlanta)
- Attendance: 19,250

The 2003 National Hockey League All-Star Game took place on February 2, 2003, at Office Depot Center in Sunrise, the home of the Florida Panthers. It was the first All-Star Game since the 1997 All-Star Game to use the Eastern Conference–Western Conference format.

== All-Star weekend ==
=== NHL YoungStars Game ===
The All-Star festivities began on February 1 with the YoungStars Game, pitting the best rookies on League rosters against each other. Months ago, it was decided that the assistant coaches of the team with the best points percentages in their respective conferences through the games of Wednesday, January 8, were selected as coaches for the Eastern Conference and Western Conference YoungStars, respectively. The YoungStars players were selected by the NHL's Hockey Operations Department, in consultation with League general managers.

The game's format changed from the previous season as it will be played using five skaters and one goaltender per team. The duration of the game will consist of three 20-minute periods, running time with three-minute stops after goals with a 20-minute break between periods. If the score is tied after three periods, a sudden-death shootout will determine the winner.

The Washington Capitals' Brian Sutherby won the Most Valuable Player for the Eastern Conference YoungStars by scoring two goals and an assist as the East cruised to an easy 8–3 victory. Hometown favourite Stephen Weiss also scored a goal and an assist for the East to thrill the Panthers fans in attendance.

=== Super Skills Competition ===
A traditional event followed the YoungStars game, with the NHL Skills Competition. The Western Conference won the competition 15–9, made memorable by hard-shooting defenseman Al MacInnis of the St. Louis Blues winning his seventh Hardest Shot event, and Colorado Avalanche's Patrick Roy allowed only a single goal through both of the Goaltending Competitions.

==== Individual event winners ====
- Puck Control Relay – Martin St. Louis (Tampa Bay Lightning)
- Fastest Skater – Marian Gaborik (Minnesota Wild) - 13.713 seconds
- Accuracy Shooting – Jeremy Roenick (Philadelphia Flyers) - 4 hits, 4 shots
- Hardest Shot – Al MacInnis (St. Louis Blues) - 98.9 mph (159.2 km/h)
- Goaltenders Competition – Patrick Roy (Colorado Avalanche) - 1 GA, 9 shots

== The game ==
On Sunday, February 2, the actual All-Star Game began. The Eastern Conference was forced to name five injury replacements to their roster, as Ed Belfour, Brian Leetch, Mario Lemieux, Saku Koivu and Mats Sundin were all out with injury. The Atlanta Thrashers' Dany Heatley opened the scoring for the Eastern Conference by scoring past Colorado Avalanche's Patrick Roy just five and a half minutes into the first period.

Colorado's Peter Forsberg and Dallas Stars' Mike Modano scored the next two goals to give the Western Conference a 2–1 lead. However, Heatley would score his second consecutive goal on Roy, tapping in a rebound of a shot by Washington Capitals' Jaromir Jagr to tie the score at 2, a bit more than halfway through the first period. Five minutes later, Minnesota Wild's Marian Gaborik scored by banging in Los Angeles Kings' Mathieu Schneider's rebound past Tampa Bay Lightning's Nikolai Khabibulin to restore the Western lead at 3–2, which remained at the end of the first period. Goaltenders Roy and Khabibulin would then be replaced by Chicago Blackhawks' Jocelyn Thibault and New Jersey Devils' Martin Brodeur for the West and the East, respectively.

The change of goaltenders made little difference for Heatley, as he finished his hat trick with a wrist shot past Thibault to tie the game at 3. For the third consecutive time, the West replied when Vancouver Canucks' Ed Jovanovski caught a deflection off the skate of Washington Capitals' Sergei Gonchar. Heatley then scored his fourth goal of the game by converting a pass from hometown hero Florida Panthers' Olli Jokinen and shooting it over Thibault's glove. Heatley's four goals in an All-Star game tied the previous records of Wayne Gretzky, Mario Lemieux, Vincent Damphousse and Mike Gartner. He also became the first player in All-Star history to score four goals with no one else scoring in between them.

No more goals were scored in the second period, and Ottawa Senators' Patrick Lalime came in to play goal for the Eastern Conference, while Dallas Stars' Marty Turco came in for the West. St. Louis Blues' Al MacInnis scored past Lalime's glove to give the West a 5–4 lead, a minute and a half into the third period.

Jokinen tied the game by taking a pass from Jaromir Jagr and skating in on a partial breakaway and putting a hard wrist shot past Turco to tie the game at 5. With ten minutes left in regulation, neither team were able to score on the two goaltender. The third period ended in a 5–5 tie and the winner of the 53rd NHL All-Star Game would have to be decided in overtime for the first time since 1988.

Patrick Lalime and Marty Turco remained in goal for the overtime, and preserved a scoreless extra period. For the first time in history, an NHL All-Star Game would be settled in a shootout. The Vancouver Canucks' Markus Naslund, Dallas Stars' Bill Guerin and the Mighty Ducks of Anaheim's Paul Kariya would score against Lalime for the Western Conference. On the other side, Turco only let in one goal in the shootout, which was scored by Dany Heatley. (Heatley's shootout goal did not count towards his regulation total of four, leaving him tied for the record.) The Western Conference won the game with a 6–5 shootout victory. Heatley, with a total of five points, was named All-Star MVP.

=== Uniforms ===
The NHL carried over the uniform design from the previous All-Star Game. Since the uniforms introduced the year before used the colors of the conference logos, the Western Conference used the same blue jersey worn by the 2002 North American team. However, due to the contrast issues from the 2002 game, the burgundy jersey worn by the World team was replaced with a white version worn by the Eastern Conference team. Both uniforms continued to feature black as the primary trim color, with silver and white accents. The player names and numbers on the back of the Western team's uniforms were rendered in black, however, leaving the uniforms completely devoid of the conference's burgundy color. Both teams continued to wear flag patches representing each player's homeland on the left shoulder. This would be the last use of national flags on the All-Star uniforms to date.

=== Summary ===
	Eastern Conference	Western Conference
Final score	5	6 (SO)
Scoring summary	Heatley (Hamrlik) 5:39 first; Heatley (2) (Jagr, Jokinen) 10:26 first; Heatley (3) (Jokinen) 2:47 second; Heatley (4) (Jokinen, Jagr) 13:58 second; Jokinen (Jagr, Heatley) 9:38 third	Forsberg (Naslund, Lidstrom) 7:14 first; Modano (Whitney, Schneider) 8:58 first; Gaborik (Schneider, Fedorov) 15:55 first; Jovanovski (Iginla, Gaborik) 12:12 second; MacInnis (Fedorov, Gaborik) 1:26 third
Shootout	Kovalev - missed; Heatley - scored; Satan - missed; Jokinen - missed	Fedorov - missed; Naslund - scored; Guerin - scored; Kariya - scored
Penalties	none	none
Shots on goal	11–12–8–3–34	14–9–14–5–42
Win/loss	L - Patrick Lalime	W - Marty Turco

- Referees: Dennis LaRue, Dan O'Halloran
- Linesmen: Jean Morin, Tim Nowak
- Television: ABC, CBC, SRC

== National anthems ==
Canadian country singer Paul Brandt sang the Canadian national anthem while Latin singer and Florida native Jorge Moreno sang the American national anthem.

== Rosters ==
	Eastern Conference	Western Conference
Head coach	(Canada) Jacques Martin (Ottawa Senators)	(Canada) Marc Crawford (Vancouver Canucks)
Assistant coach	(Canada) Ken Hitchcock (Philadelphia Flyers)	(Canada) Dave Lewis (Detroit Red Wings)
Lineup	Starting lineup: (Russia) 35 - G Nikolai Khabibulin (Tampa Bay Lightning); (Canada) 4 - D Scott Stevens (New Jersey Devils) - (C); (Latvia) 44 - D Sandis Ozolinsh (Florida Panthers); (Czech Republic) 68 - LW Jaromir Jagr (Washington Capitals); (United States) 97 - C Jeremy Roenick (Philadelphia Flyers); (Russia) 27 - RW Alexei Kovalev (Pittsburgh Penguins); Reserves: (Slovakia) 3 - D Zdeno Chara (Ottawa Senators); (United States) 5 - D Tom Poti (New York Rangers); (Canada) 8 - C Vincent Lecavalier (Tampa Bay Lightning); (Finland) 12 - C Olli Jokinen (Florida Panthers); (Canada) 15 - LW Dany Heatley (Atlanta Thrashers); (Slovakia) 18 - RW Marian Hossa (Ottawa Senators); (Canada) 19 - C Joe Thornton (Boston Bruins); (Czech Republic) 22 - D Roman Hamrlik (New York Islanders); (Canada) 26 - RW Martin St. Louis (Tampa Bay Lightning); (Canada) 30 - G Martin Brodeur (New Jersey Devils); (Canada) 40 - G Patrick Lalime (Ottawa Senators); (Russia) 55 - D Sergei Gonchar (Washington Capitals); (Canada) 72 - RW Glen Murray (Boston Bruins); (Slovakia) 81 - RW Miroslav Satan (Buffalo Sabres); (Canada) 92 - RW Jeff O'Neill (Carolina Hurricanes)	Starting lineup: (Canada) 33 - G Patrick Roy (Colorado Avalanche); (Canada) 4 - D Rob Blake (Colorado Avalanche); (Sweden) 5 - D Nicklas Lidstrom (Detroit Red Wings); (Finland) 8 - LW Teemu Selanne (San Jose Sharks); (United States) 9 - C Mike Modano (Dallas Stars) - (C); (United States) 13 - RW Bill Guerin (Dallas Stars); Reserves: (Canada) 2 - D Al MacInnis (St. Louis Blues); (Canada) 3 - D Eric Brewer (Edmonton Oilers); (United States) 10 - D Mathieu Schneider (Los Angeles Kings); (Slovakia) 11 - RW Marian Gaborik (Minnesota Wild); (Canada) 12 - RW Jarome Iginla (Calgary Flames); (Canada) 14 - LW Ray Whitney (Columbus Blue Jackets); (Canada) 16 - LW Paul Kariya (Mighty Ducks of Anaheim); (Sweden) 19 - LW Markus Naslund (Vancouver Canucks); (Sweden) 21 - C Peter Forsberg (Colorado Avalanche); (Canada) 35 - G Marty Turco (Dallas Stars); (United States) 39 - C Doug Weight (St. Louis Blues); (Canada) 41 - G Jocelyn Thibault (Chicago Blackhawks); (Canada) 44 - RW Todd Bertuzzi (Vancouver Canucks); (Canada) 55 - D Ed Jovanovski (Vancouver Canucks); (Russia) 91 - C Sergei Fedorov (Detroit Red Wings)

Notes

- ^1 Brian Leetch was voted as a starter, but was unable to play due to injury. Tom Poti was selected as his replacement, while Scott Stevens was named as his replacement in the starting lineup.
- ^2 Sandis Ozolinsh was chosen as a member of the Florida Panthers, but was traded to the Mighty Ducks of Anaheim two nights before the game. The public address announcement was: "From your Florida Panthers but now playing for the Mighty Ducks of Anaheim, #8 Sandis Ozolinsh!!"
- ^3 Mario Lemieux was voted as a starter, but was unable to play due to injury. Vincent Lecavalier was selected as his replacement, while Jeremy Roenick was named as his replacement in the starting lineup.
- ^4 Mats Sundin was selected, but was unable to play due to injury. Olli Jokinen was named as his replacement.
- ^5 Ed Belfour was selected, but was unable to play due to injury. Patrick Lalime was named as his replacement.
- ^6 Saku Koivu was selected, but was unable to play due to injury. Miroslav Satan was named as his replacement.

== See also ==
- 2002–03 NHL season
