= 2002–03 Colorado Avalanche season =

National Hockey League team season

2002–03 Colorado Avalanche
- Northwest Division champions
- Division: 1st Northwest
- Conference: 3rd Western
- 2002–03 record: 42–19–13–8
- Home record: 21–9–8–3
- Road record: 21–10–5–5
- Goals for: 251
- Goals against: 194

Team information
- General manager: Pierre Lacroix
- Coach: Bob Hartley (Oct.–Dec.); Tony Granato (Dec.–Apr.)
- Captain: Joe Sakic
- Alternate captains: Rob Blake; Adam Foote; Peter Forsberg; Mike Keane
- Arena: Pepsi Center
- Average attendance: 18,007
- Minor league affiliate: Hershey Bears

Team leaders
- Goals: Milan Hejduk (50)
- Assists: Peter Forsberg (77)
- Points: Peter Forsberg (106)
- Penalty minutes: Adam Foote (88)
- Plus/minus: Peter Forsberg (+52); Milan Hejduk (+52)
- Wins: Patrick Roy (35)
- Goals against average: Patrick Roy (2.18)

The 2002–03 Colorado Avalanche season was the Avalanche's eighth season. It involved winning their fifth Northwest Division and a record ninth consecutive division title.

== Regular season ==
- Head coach Bob Hartley was fired on December 18 and replaced by assistant coach Tony Granato.
- January 20, 2003: In a game against the Dallas Stars, Patrick Roy became the first goaltender to appear in 1,000 regular season games. At the end of the game, Marty Turco raised his mask to praise Patrick. Prior to the game, Rogatien Vachon presented Roy with a silver goalie stick. Jim Gregory, vice-president of operations for the NHL presented Roy with a crystal sculpture.
- April 6, 2003: In a game against the St. Louis Blues, Patrick Roy played the last regular season game of his career. The Avalanche won the game by a score of 5–2. It was Roy's 1,029th game, and his 551st victory.

=== Final standings ===
Northwest Division
No.	CR		GP	W	L	T	OTL	GF	GA	Pts
1	3	**Colorado Avalanche**	82	42	19	13	8	251	194	105
2	4	**Vancouver Canucks**	82	45	23	13	1	264	208	104
3	6	**Minnesota Wild**	82	42	29	10	1	198	178	95
4	8	**Edmonton Oilers**	82	36	26	11	9	231	230	92
5	12	Calgary Flames	82	29	36	13	4	186	228	75

Note: CR = Conference rank; GP = Games played; W = Wins; L = Losses; T = Ties; OTL = Overtime loss; GF = Goals for; GA = Goals against; Pts = Points
Bolded teams qualified for the playoffs.

Western Conference
R		Div	GP	W	L	T	OTL	GF	GA	Pts
**1**	**Z-** Dallas Stars	**PA**	**82**	**46**	**17**	**15**	**4**	**245**	**169**	111
**2**	**Y-** Detroit Red Wings	**CE**	**82**	**48**	**20**	**10**	**4**	**269**	**203**	110
**3**	**Y-** Colorado Avalanche	**NW**	**82**	**42**	**19**	**13**	**8**	**251**	**194**	105
**4**	**X-** Vancouver Canucks	**NW**	**82**	**45**	**23**	**13**	**1**	**264**	**208**	104
**5**	**X-** St. Louis Blues	**CE**	**82**	**41**	**24**	**11**	**6**	**253**	**222**	99
**6**	**X-** Minnesota Wild	**NW**	**82**	**42**	**29**	**10**	**1**	**198**	**178**	95
**7**	**X-** Mighty Ducks of Anaheim	**PA**	**82**	**40**	**27**	**9**	**6**	**203**	**193**	95
**8**	**X-** Edmonton Oilers	**NW**	**82**	**36**	**26**	**11**	**9**	**231**	**230**	92
8.5
9	Chicago Blackhawks	CE	82	30	33	13	6	207	226	79
10	Los Angeles Kings	PA	82	33	37	6	6	203	221	78
11	Phoenix Coyotes	PA	82	31	35	11	5	204	230	78
12	Calgary Flames	NW	82	29	36	13	4	186	228	75
13	Nashville Predators	CE	82	27	35	13	7	183	206	74
14	San Jose Sharks	PA	82	28	37	9	8	214	239	73
15	Columbus Blue Jackets	CE	82	29	42	8	3	213	263	69

Divisions: PA – Pacific, CE – Central, NW – Northwest

Z – Clinched conference; Y – Clinched division; X – Clinched playoff spot

== Schedule and results ==
=== Regular season ===
2002–03 regular season
October: 4–1–3–2 (home: 0–1–3–0; road: 4–0–0–2)

Game	Date	Score	Opponent	Record	Recap
1	October 9, 2002	1–1 OT	Dallas Stars (2002–03)	0–0–1–0	T
2	October 14, 2002	1–2	Boston Bruins (2002–03)	0–1–1–0	L
3	October 17, 2002	4–1	@ Los Angeles Kings (2002–03)	1–1–1–0	W
4	October 19, 2002	3–1	@ San Jose Sharks (2002–03)	2–1–1–0	W
5	October 20, 2002	2–3 OT	@ Mighty Ducks of Anaheim (2002–03)	2–1–1–1	OTL
6	October 22, 2002	3–3 OT	Edmonton Oilers (2002–03)	2–1–2–1	T
7	October 24, 2002	3–2	@ Phoenix Coyotes (2002–03)	3–1–2–1	W
8	October 27, 2002	3–3 OT	Minnesota Wild (2002–03)	3–1–3–1	T
9	October 29, 2002	2–3 OT	@ Minnesota Wild (2002–03)	3–1–3–2	OTL
10	October 31, 2002	5–1	@ Vancouver Canucks (2002–03)	4–1–3–2	W

November: 4–5–5–1 (home: 2–3–2–1; road: 2–2–3–0)

Game	Date	Score	Opponent	Record	Recap
11	November 2, 2002	4–4 OT	@ Calgary Flames (2002–03)	4–1–4–2	T
12	November 4, 2002	2–4	Vancouver Canucks (2002–03)	4–2–4–2	L
13	November 6, 2002	2–5	Ottawa Senators (2002–03)	4–3–4–2	L
14	November 8, 2002	2–3 OT	Mighty Ducks of Anaheim (2002–03)	4–3–4–3	OTL
15	November 10, 2002	3–4	Nashville Predators (2002–03)	4–4–4–3	L
16	November 12, 2002	5–4	Columbus Blue Jackets (2002–03)	5–4–4–3	W
17	November 14, 2002	3–1	@ Nashville Predators (2002–03)	6–4–4–3	W
18	November 15, 2002	2–4	@ Dallas Stars (2002–03)	6–5–4–3	L
19	November 17, 2002	4–4 OT	@ Phoenix Coyotes (2002–03)	6–5–5–3	T
20	November 21, 2002	1–1 OT	Nashville Predators (2002–03)	6–5–6–3	T
21	November 23, 2002	3–1	@ St. Louis Blues (2002–03)	7–5–6–3	W
22	November 25, 2002	1–0	Chicago Blackhawks (2002–03)	8–5–6–3	W
23	November 27, 2002	4–4 OT	St. Louis Blues (2002–03)	8–5–7–3	T
24	November 29, 2002	2–2 OT	@ Minnesota Wild (2002–03)	8–5–8–3	T
25	November 30, 2002	0–1	@ Edmonton Oilers (2002–03)	8–6–8–3	L

December: 6–3–1–2 (home: 5–1–1–1; road: 1–2–0–1)

Game	Date	Score	Opponent	Record	Recap
26	December 3, 2002	1–2	Calgary Flames (2002–03)	8–7–8–3	L
27	December 6, 2002	7–6 OT	Montreal Canadiens (2002–03)	9–7–8–3	W
28	December 11, 2002	1–3	@ Vancouver Canucks (2002–03)	9–8–8–3	L
29	December 13, 2002	3–4 OT	@ Edmonton Oilers (2002–03)	9–8–8–4	OTL
30	December 14, 2002	3–1	@ Calgary Flames (2002–03)	10–8–8–4	W
31	December 16, 2002	2–2 OT	Washington Capitals (2002–03)	10–8–9–4	T
32	December 19, 2002	2–1	Edmonton Oilers (2002–03)	11–8–9–4	W
33	December 21, 2002	4–2	Minnesota Wild (2002–03)	12–8–9–4	W
34	December 23, 2002	5–3	Vancouver Canucks (2002–03)	13–8–9–4	W
35	December 26, 2002	2–3	@ St. Louis Blues (2002–03)	13–9–9–4	L
36	December 27, 2002	1–2 OT	Philadelphia Flyers (2002–03)	13–9–9–5	OTL
37	December 29, 2002	6–1	Los Angeles Kings (2002–03)	14–9–9–5	W

January: 6–5–2–0 (home: 1–4–1–0; road: 5–1–1–0)

Game	Date	Score	Opponent	Record	Recap
38	January 1, 2003	7–3	@ Nashville Predators (2002–03)	15–9–9–5	W
39	January 2, 2003	1–4	Florida Panthers (2002–03)	15–10–9–5	L
40	January 4, 2003	6–1	@ San Jose Sharks (2002–03)	16–10–9–5	W
41	January 7, 2003	2–4	Calgary Flames (2002–03)	16–11–9–5	L
42	January 9, 2003	3–5	Mighty Ducks of Anaheim (2002–03)	16–12–9–5	L
43	January 11, 2003	3–6	@ Dallas Stars (2002–03)	16–13–9–5	L
44	January 12, 2003	3–2 OT	@ Carolina Hurricanes (2002–03)	17–13–9–5	W
45	January 16, 2003	2–4	Detroit Red Wings (2002–03)	17–14–9–5	L
46	January 20, 2003	1–1 OT	Dallas Stars (2002–03)	17–14–10–5	T
47	January 23, 2003	5–0	Columbus Blue Jackets (2002–03)	18–14–10–5	W
48	January 25, 2003	3–0	@ Toronto Maple Leafs (2002–03)	19–14–10–5	W
49	January 28, 2003	2–2 OT	@ Columbus Blue Jackets (2002–03)	19–14–11–5	T
50	January 30, 2003	4–3 OT	@ New York Rangers (2002–03)	20–14–11–5	W

February: 10–1–0–2 (home: 6–0–0–1; road: 4–1–0–1)

Game	Date	Score	Opponent	Record	Recap
51	February 4, 2003	3–2 OT	@ Boston Bruins (2002–03)	21–14–11–5	W
52	February 6, 2003	1–0	@ Detroit Red Wings (2002–03)	22–14–11–5	W
53	February 8, 2003	5–3	Detroit Red Wings (2002–03)	23–14–11–5	W
54	February 9, 2003	4–2	Calgary Flames (2002–03)	24–14–11–5	W
55	February 11, 2003	3–1	New Jersey Devils (2002–03)	25–14–11–5	W
56	February 13, 2003	1–2 OT	@ Vancouver Canucks (2002–03)	25–14–11–6	OTL
57	February 15, 2003	3–2	Minnesota Wild (2002–03)	26–14–11–6	W
58	February 17, 2003	5–4	@ Chicago Blackhawks (2002–03)	27–14–11–6	W
59	February 20, 2003	5–2	@ Pittsburgh Penguins (2002–03)	28–14–11–6	W
60	February 21, 2003	1–4	@ New York Islanders (2002–03)	28–15–11–6	L
61	February 23, 2003	4–1	New York Rangers (2002–03)	29–15–11–6	W
62	February 25, 2003	4–2	Edmonton Oilers (2002–03)	30–15–11–6	W
63	February 27, 2003	3–4 OT	Atlanta Thrashers (2002–03)	30–15–11–7	OTL

March: 10–3–2–1 (home: 6–0–1–0; road: 4–3–1–1)

Game	Date	Score	Opponent	Record	Recap
64	March 1, 2003	4–1	Pittsburgh Penguins (2002–03)	31–15–11–7	W
65	March 2, 2003	3–2 OT	@ Chicago Blackhawks (2002–03)	32–15–11–7	W
66	March 5, 2003	3–1	@ Florida Panthers (2002–03)	33–15–11–7	W
67	March 7, 2003	3–4	@ Tampa Bay Lightning (2002–03)	33–16–11–7	L
68	March 8, 2003	2–1 OT	@ Philadelphia Flyers (2002–03)	34–16–11–7	W
69	March 10, 2003	2–2 OT	Phoenix Coyotes (2002–03)	34–16–12–7	T
70	March 13, 2003	5–1	@ Columbus Blue Jackets (2002–03)	35–16–12–7	W
71	March 15, 2003	3–5	@ Detroit Red Wings (2002–03)	35–17–12–7	L
72	March 16, 2003	1–2	@ Washington Capitals (2002–03)	35–18–12–7	L
73	March 20, 2003	2–0	San Jose Sharks (2002–03)	36–18–12–7	W
74	March 22, 2003	8–1	Chicago Blackhawks (2002–03)	37–18–12–7	W
75	March 24, 2003	3–4 OT	@ Buffalo Sabres (2002–03)	37–18–12–8	OTL
76	March 25, 2003	2–2 OT	@ Ottawa Senators (2002–03)	37–18–13–8	T
77	March 27, 2003	3–0	Los Angeles Kings (2002–03)	38–18–13–8	W
78	March 29, 2003	6–1	Phoenix Coyotes (2002–03)	39–18–13–8	W
79	March 31, 2003	3–1	San Jose Sharks (2002–03)	40–18–13–8	W

April: 2–1–0–0 (home: 1–0–0–0; road: 1–1–0–0)

Game	Date	Score	Opponent	Record	Recap
80	April 2, 2003	3–5	@ Los Angeles Kings (2002–03)	40–19–13–8	L
81	April 4, 2003	4–3 OT	@ Mighty Ducks of Anaheim (2002–03)	41–19–13–8	W
82	April 6, 2003	5–2	St. Louis Blues (2002–03)	42–19–13–8	W

Legend: W Win (2 points) L Loss (0 points) T Tie (1 point) OTL Overtime loss (1 point)

=== Playoffs ===
2003 Stanley Cup playoffs
Western Conference Quarterfinals vs. (6) Minnesota Wild – Wild win 4–3

Game	Date	Score	Opponent	Series	Recap
1	April 10, 2003	2–4	Minnesota Wild	Wild lead 1–0	L
2	April 12, 2003	3–2	Minnesota Wild	Series tied 1–1	W
3	April 14, 2003	3–0	@ Minnesota Wild	Avalanche lead 2–1	W
4	April 16, 2003	3–1	@ Minnesota Wild	Avalanche lead 3–1	W
5	April 19, 2003	2–3	Minnesota Wild	Avalanche lead 3–2	L
6	April 21, 2003	2–3 OT	@ Minnesota Wild	Series tied 3–3	L
7	April 22, 2003	2–3 OT	Minnesota Wild	Wild win 4–3	L

Legend: W Win L Loss

== Player statistics ==
=== Scoring ===
- Position abbreviations: C = Center; D = Defense; G = Goaltender; LW = Left wing; RW = Right wing
- † = Joined team via a transaction (e.g., trade, waivers, signing) during the season. Stats reflect time with the Avalanche only.
- ‡ = Left team via a transaction (e.g., trade, waivers, release) during the season. Stats reflect time with the Avalanche only.

No.	Player	Pos	Regular season						Playoffs					
No.	Player	Pos	GP	G	A	Pts	+/-	PIM	GP	G	A	Pts	+/-	PIM
21	Peter Forsberg	C	75	29	77	106	52	70	7	2	6	8	3	6
23	Milan Hejduk	RW	82	50	48	98	52	32	7	2	2	4	4	2
40	Alex Tanguay	LW	82	26	41	67	34	36	7	1	2	3	−2	4
19	Joe Sakic	C	58	26	32	58	4	24	7	6	3	9	1	2
28	Steve Reinprecht	C	77	18	33	51	−6	18	7	1	2	3	1	0
53	Derek Morris	D	75	11	37	48	16	68	7	0	3	3	2	6
4	Rob Blake	D	79	17	28	45	20	57	7	1	2	3	2	8
7	Greg de Vries	D	82	6	26	32	15	70	7	2	0	2	2	0
52	Adam Foote	D	78	11	20	31	30	88	6	0	1	1	2	8
17	Radim Vrbata‡	RW	66	11	19	30	0	16	—	—	—	—	—	—
41	Martin Skoula	D	81	4	21	25	11	68	7	0	1	1	−1	4
37	Dean McAmmond‡	C	41	10	8	18	1	10	—	—	—	—	—	—
29	Eric Messier	LW	72	4	10	14	−2	16	5	0	0	0	0	0
13	Dan Hinote	RW	60	6	4	10	4	49	7	1	2	3	0	2
12	Mike Keane	RW	65	5	5	10	0	34	6	0	0	0	0	2
10	Serge Aubin	LW	66	4	6	10	−2	64	5	0	0	0	1	4
22	Vaclav Nedorost	C	42	4	5	9	8	20	—	—	—	—	—	—
11	Jeff Shantz	C	74	3	6	9	−12	35	6	0	0	0	1	4
32	Riku Hahl	C	42	3	4	7	3	12	6	0	2	2	2	2
44	Bates Battaglia†	LW	13	1	5	6	−2	10	7	0	2	2	1	4
27	Scott Parker	RW	43	1	3	4	6	82	1	0	0	0	0	2
9	Brad Larsen	LW	6	0	3	3	3	2	—	—	—	—	—	—
20	Bryan Marchment†	D	14	0	3	3	4	33	7	0	0	0	1	4
2	Bryan Muir	D	32	0	2	2	3	19	—	—	—	—	—	—
6	D. J. Smith	D	34	1	0	1	2	55	—	—	—	—	—	—
24	Chris McAllister†	D	14	0	1	1	6	26	1	0	0	0	0	0
50	Brian Willsie	RW	12	0	1	1	0	15	6	1	0	1	1	2
1	David Aebischer	G	22	0	0	0		4	—	—	—	—	—	—
45	Steve Brule	RW	2	0	0	0	0	0	—	—	—	—	—	—
36	Steve Moore	C	4	0	0	0	0	0	—	—	—	—	—	—
39	Jeff Paul	D	2	0	0	0	0	7	—	—	—	—	—	—
33	Patrick Roy	G	63	0	0	0		20	7	0	0	0		0
38	Charlie Stephens	C	2	0	0	0	0	0	—	—	—	—	—	—

=== Goaltending ===
No.	Player	Regular season										Playoffs								
No.	Player	GP	W	L	T	SA	GA	GAA	SV%	SO	TOI	GP	W	L	SA	GA	GAA	SV%	SO	TOI
33	Patrick Roy	63	35	15	13	1723	137	2.18	.920	5	3769	7	3	4	177	16	2.27	.910	1	423
1	David Aebischer	22	7	12	0	593	50	2.43	.916	1	1235	—	—	—	—	—	—	—	—	—

== Awards and records ==
=== Awards ===
Type	Award/honor	Recipient	Ref
League (annual)	Art Ross Trophy	Peter Forsberg	
League (annual)	Hart Memorial Trophy	Peter Forsberg	
League (annual)	Lester Patrick Trophy	Ray Bourque	
League (annual)	Maurice "Rocket" Richard Trophy	Milan Hejduk	
League (annual)	NHL First All-Star Team	Peter Forsberg (Center)	
League (annual)	NHL Second All-Star Team	Milan Hejduk (Right wing)	
League (annual)	NHL Plus-Minus Award	Peter Forsberg	
League (annual)	NHL Plus-Minus Award	Milan Hejduk	
League (in-season)	NHL All-Star Game selection	Rob Blake (Note: Blake and Roy were voted to the starting lineup.)	
League (in-season)	NHL All-Star Game selection	Peter Forsberg	
League (in-season)	NHL All-Star Game selection	Patrick Roy	
League (in-season)	NHL Player of the Month	Peter Forsberg (February)	
League (in-season)	NHL Player of the Week	Joe Sakic (November 4)	
League (in-season)	NHL Player of the Week	Patrick Roy (January 27)	
League (in-season)	NHL Player of the Week	Patrick Roy (February 10)	
League (in-season)	NHL Player of the Week	Milan Hejduk (April 7) (Note: Co-winner with Marty Turco of the Dallas Stars.)	
League (in-season)	NHL YoungStars Game selection	David Aebischer	

=== Milestones ===
Milestone	Player	Date	Ref
First game	Jeff Paul	October 9, 2002	
First game	Charlie Stephens	December 27, 2002	
1,000th game played	Patrick Roy	January 20, 2003	

== Transactions ==
The Avalanche were involved in the following transactions from June 14, 2002, the day after the deciding game of the 2002 Stanley Cup Finals, through June 9, 2003, the day of the deciding game of the 2003 Stanley Cup Finals.

=== Trades ===
Date	Details		Ref
October 1, 2002	To Colorado Avalanche: Dean McAmmond; Derek Morris; Jeff Shantz	To Calgary Flames: Chris Drury; Stephane Yelle	
December 5, 2002	To Colorado Avalanche: Dale Clarke	To St. Louis Blues: Conditional draft pick	
February 5, 2003	To Colorado Avalanche: Chris McAllister	To Philadelphia Flyers: 6th-round pick in 2003	
March 8, 2003	To Colorado Avalanche: Bryan Marchment	To San Jose Sharks: 3rd-round pick in 2003; 5th-round pick in 2003	
March 11, 2003	To Colorado Avalanche: Bates Battaglia	To Carolina Hurricanes: Radim Vrbata	
March 11, 2003	To Colorado Avalanche: 5th-round pick in 2003 or 2004	To Calgary Flames: Dean McAmmond	
March 11, 2003	To Colorado Avalanche: 7th-round pick in 2003	To Nashville Predators: Alexander Riazantsev	

=== Players acquired ===
Date	Player	Former team	Term	Via	Ref
July 22, 2002	Steve Brule	Detroit Red Wings	1-year	Free agency	
August 27, 2002	Serge Aubin	Columbus Blue Jackets		Free agency	
August 27, 2002	Lance Pitlick	Florida Panthers		Free agency	
June 3, 2003	Tom Lawson	Fort Wayne Komets (UHL)		Free agency	

=== Players lost ===
Date	Player	New team	Via (Note: In parentheses is the player's free agency group on July 1 if applicable.)	Ref
July 1, 2002	Matt Scorsune (Note: Scorsune retired.)		Contract expiration (UFA)	
July 2, 2002	Darius Kasparaitis	New York Rangers	Free agency (V)	
July 9, 2002	Yuri Babenko	HC Dynamo Moscow (RSL)	Free agency (UFA)	
July 10, 2002	Jaroslav Obsut	Vancouver Canucks	Free agency (VI)	
July 12, 2002	Sanny Lindstrom	Timra IK (SHL)	Free agency (II) (Note: Colorado retained Lindstrom’s NHL rights through the 2007–08 season.)	
July 16, 2002	Pascal Trepanier	Nashville Predators	Free agency (UFA)	
July 27, 2002	Kelly Fairchild	Eisbaren Berlin (DEL)	Free agency (VI)	
August 24, 2002	Jeff Daw	Lowell Lock Monsters (AHL)	Free agency (VI)	
September 30, 2002	Lance Pitlick		Retirement	
May 28, 2003	Patrick Roy		Retirement	

=== Signings ===
Date	Player	Term	Contract type	Ref
July 23, 2002	Peter Budaj		Entry-level	
July 23, 2002	Dan Hinote		Re-signing	
July 23, 2002	Sergei Klyazmin		Entry-level	
July 23, 2002	Brad Larsen		Re-signing	
July 23, 2002	Bryan Muir		Re-signing	
July 23, 2002	Agris Saviels		Entry-level	
July 23, 2002	D. J. Smith		Re-signing	
July 23, 2002	Charlie Stephens		Entry-level	
September 5, 2002	Martin Skoula	3-year	Re-signing	
September 9, 2002	Alex Tanguay	1-year	Re-signing	
March 14, 2003	Johnny Boychuk	multi-year	Entry-level	
March 29, 2003	John-Michael Liles	multi-year	Entry-level	
June 3, 2003	Cody McCormick		Entry-level	

== Draft picks ==
Colorado's draft picks at the 2002 NHL entry draft held at the Air Canada Centre in Toronto, Ontario.

Round	#	Player	Nationality	College/Junior/Club team (League)
1	28	Jonas Johansson	Sweden	HV71 (Sweden)
2	61	Johnny Boychuk	Canada	Calgary Hitmen (WHL)
3	94	Eric Lundberg	United States	Providence College (Hockey East)
4	107	Mikko Kalteva	Finland	Jokerit Jr. (Finland)
4	129	Tom Gilbert	United States	Chicago Steel (USHL)
5	164	Tyler Weiman	Canada	Tri-City Americans (WHL)
6	195	Taylor Christie	Canada	Bowling Green State University (WCHA)
7	227	Ryan Steeves	Canada	Yale University (ECAC)
8	258	Sergei Shemetov	Russia	Elemash Elektrostal (Russia)
9	289	Sean Collins	United States	University of New Hampshire (Hockey East)

== See also ==
- 2002–03 NHL season
