= 2001 Stanley Cup Final =

2001 ice hockey championship series

	1	2	3	4	5	6	7	Total
Colorado Avalanche	5	1	3	2	1	4	3	4
New Jersey Devils	0	2	1	3	4	0	1	3
- Location(s): Denver: Pepsi Center (1, 2, 5, 7); East Rutherford: Continental Airlines Arena (3, 4, 6)
- Coaches: Colorado: Bob Hartley; New Jersey: Larry Robinson
- Captains: Colorado: Joe Sakic; New Jersey: Scott Stevens
- National anthems: Colorado: Jake Schroeder; New Jersey: Arlette Roxburgh
- Referees: Dan Marouelli (1, 3, 6, 7); Paul Devorski (1, 4); Bill McCreary (2, 4, 6); Rob Shick (2, 5); Kerry Fraser (3, 5, 7)
- Dates: May 26 – June 9, 2001
- MVP: Patrick Roy (Avalanche)
- Series-winning goal: Alex Tanguay (4:57, second)
- Hall of Famers: Avalanche: Rob Blake (2014); Ray Bourque (2004); Peter Forsberg (2014; did not play); Patrick Roy (2006); Joe Sakic (2012); Devils: Martin Brodeur (2018); Alexander Mogilny (2025); Scott Niedermayer (2013); Scott Stevens (2007); Coaches: Larry Robinson (1995, player); Bryan Trottier (1997, player); Officials: Bill McCreary (2014)
- Networks: Canada: (English): CBC (French): SRC; United States: (English): ESPN (1–2), ABC (3–7)
- Announcers: (CBC) Bob Cole and Harry Neale (SRC) Claude Quenneville and Michel Bergeron (ESPN/ABC) Gary Thorne and Bill Clement

The 2001 Stanley Cup Final was the championship series of the National Hockey League's (NHL) 2000–01 season, and the culmination of the 2001 Stanley Cup playoffs. It was contested between the Eastern Conference champion and defending Stanley Cup champion New Jersey Devils and the Western Conference champion and Presidents' Trophy-winning Colorado Avalanche. It was Colorado's second appearance in the Final, and the first since the team won the Cup in 1996. It was New Jersey's third appearance in the Final and second straight appearance after winning the Cup in the previous year.

Colorado defeated New Jersey in seven games to win their second Stanley Cup in franchise history. Colorado's Patrick Roy was awarded the Conn Smythe Trophy as the MVP of the 2001 playoffs. This was the first Stanley Cup Final since 1994 that would be decided in the maximum seven games. This was also the first and, as of 2026, most recent Final since 1989 that the number one seeds in each conference met in the Final. This marked the only time in NHL history where two teams who occupied the same market at different times faced off against each other. The Devils were based out of Denver as the Colorado Rockies from 1976 to 1982 and the Avalanche established themselves in the city in 1995 after relocating from Quebec City.

== Paths to the Final ==
=== New Jersey Devils ===
New Jersey finished the regular season with 111 points and an Atlantic Division title, good for the first overall seed in the Eastern Conference. In the playoffs, they defeated the Carolina Hurricanes 4–2, the Toronto Maple Leafs 4–3 and the Pittsburgh Penguins 4–1 to advance to the Final.

=== Colorado Avalanche ===
Colorado finished the regular season with 118 points and a Northwest Division title, good for the first overall seed in the Western Conference, and the Presidents' Trophy as the team with the league's best regular season record. In the playoffs, they defeated the Vancouver Canucks 4–0, the Los Angeles Kings 4–3 and the St. Louis Blues 4–1 to advance to the Final.

== Game summaries ==
=== Game one ===
May 26	New Jersey Devils	0–5	Colorado Avalanche	Pepsi Center	Recap

Colorado would be without star forward Peter Forsberg during the Final, as he had suffered splenic injury in game seven of the Western Conference semifinals against the Los Angeles Kings.

Joe Sakic scored his 10th and 11th goal of the playoffs in the first and second periods of game one. The Avalanche smothered the New Jersey defense and scored five goals in the game. Patrick Roy stopped all 25 shots he faced to record his third shutout of the postseason. Late in the third period, Steven Reinprecht scored to make the game 5–0. Initially, referee Dan Marouelli thought Martin Brodeur had made a save and called no goal, but after video review, it was revealed that the puck slipped through Brodeur's legs and crossed the goal line. Following Reinprecht initially denied goal, things culminated in a fistfight between Colorado forward Chris Dingman and New Jersey defenseman Sean O'Donnell. O'Donnell also received a minor penalty for instigating the fight and was a given a misconduct. The third period had a total tally of 44 penalty minutes accumulated by both clubs.

Scoring summary
Period	Team	Goal	Assist(s)	Time	Score
1st	COL	Joe Sakic (10)	Milan Hejduk (14) and Rob Blake (11)	11:07	1–0 COL
2nd	COL	Chris Drury (9)	Dan Hinote (2) and Ville Nieminen (5)	09:35	2–0 COL
2nd	COL	Joe Sakic (11)	Rob Blake (12) and Martin Skoula (5)	15:06	3–0 COL
3rd	COL	Rob Blake (5) – pp	Alex Tanguay (13) and Joe Sakic (13)	05:36	4–0 COL
3rd	COL	Steven Reinprecht (2)	Chris Dingman (3) and Dave Reid (3)	17:36	5–0 COL
Penalty summary
Period	Team	Player	Penalty	Time	PIM
1st	NJ	Colin White	Holding	04:28	2:00
1st	COL	Shjon Podein	Elbowing	13:46	2:00
2nd	COL	Greg de Vries	Boarding	07:01	2:00
2nd	COL	Alex Tanguay	Tripping	10:46	2:00
2nd	COL	Ville Nieminen	Goaltender interference	14:16	2:00
2nd	NJ	Ken Daneyko	Boarding	14:16	2:00
3rd	COL	Dan Hinote	Holding	03:30	2:00
3rd	NJ	Turner Stevenson	Goaltender interference	04:45	2:00
3rd	COL	Adam Foote	Roughing – double minor	08:04	4:00
3rd	NJ	Petr Sykora	Charging	08:04	2:00
3rd	NJ	Colin White	Roughing	08:04	2:00
3rd	NJ	Ken Daneyko	Roughing	09:43	2:00
3rd	NJ	Ken Daneyko	Slashing	09:43	2:00
3rd	COL	Shjon Podein	Tripping	11:34	2:00
3rd	NJ	Sean O'Donnell	Roughing	11:34	2:00
3rd	COL	Greg de Vries	Tripping	13:20	2:00
3rd	COL	Chris Dingman	Fighting – major	17:36	5:00
3rd	NJ	Sean O'Donnell	Instigator	17:36	2:00
3rd	NJ	Sean O'Donnell	Fighting – major	17:36	5:00
3rd	NJ	Sean O'Donnell	Misconduct	17:36	10:00
3rd	COL	Dan Hinote	Roughing	18:20	2:00

Shots by period
Team	1	2	3	Total
New Jersey	7	11	7	25
Colorado	14	7	9	30

=== Game two ===
May 29	New Jersey Devils	2–1	Colorado Avalanche	Pepsi Center	Recap

The second game began with goals in the first period by Colorado's Sakic and New Jersey's Bob Corkum and Turner Stevenson. The 2–1 lead by the Devils held throughout the game as they defeated the Avalanche to even the series at one game apiece.

Scoring summary
Period	Team	Goal	Assist(s)	Time	Score
1st	COL	Joe Sakic (12) – pp	Milan Hejduk (15) and Rob Blake (13)	05:58	1–0 COL
1st	NJ	Bob Corkum (1)	Brian Rafalski (9)	14:29	1–1
1st	NJ	Turner Stevenson (1)	Scott Niedermayer (9) and Alexander Mogilny (10)	17:20	2–1 NJ
2nd	None				
3rd	None				
Penalty summary
Period	Team	Player	Penalty	Time	PIM
1st	NJ	Scott Niedermayer	Cross-checking	01:43	2:00
1st	NJ	Sergei Brylin	Interference	04:53	2:00
1st	NJ	Patrik Elias	Slashing	12:28	2:00
1st	COL	Eric Messier	Roughing	14:46	2:00
1st	COL	Adam Foote	Holding the stick	15:17	2:00
1st	NJ	Bobby Holik	Slashing	19:39	2:00
2nd	COL	Greg de Vries	Interference	09:11	2:00
2nd	NJ	John Madden	Embellishment	09:11	2:00
2nd	COL	Martin Skoula	Holding	14:47	2:00
3rd	NJ	Ken Daneyko	Cross-checking	01:28	2:00
3rd	COL	Ville Nieminen	Roughing	02:58	2:00
3rd	NJ	Colin White	Roughing	02:58	2:00
3rd	NJ	Alexander Mogilny	High-sticking	04:26	2:00

Shots by period
Team	1	2	3	Total
New Jersey	12	6	2	20
Colorado	8	4	8	20

=== Game three ===
May 31	Colorado Avalanche	3–1	New Jersey Devils	Continental Airlines Arena	Recap

Game three was held in New Jersey. Devils centre Jason Arnott scored an early power-play goal, but in the tenth minute, the Avalanche evened through defenceman Martin Skoula. Neither team scored any goals in the second period. Early in the third, Colorado defenceman Ray Bourque scored a power-play goal to break the tie. Five minutes later, Colorado winger Dan Hinote scored the team's third goal, and the Devils did not respond. The win by Colorado marked another road win in the series.

Scoring summary
Period	Team	Goal	Assist(s)	Time	Score
1st	NJ	Jason Arnott (8) – pp	Bobby Holik (9) and Patrik Elias (12)	03:16	1–0 NJ
1st	COL	Martin Skoula (1)	Shjon Podein (3) and Eric Messier (2)	10:38	1–1
2nd	None				
3rd	COL	Ray Bourque (4) – pp	Joe Sakic (10)	00:31	2–1 COL
3rd	COL	Dan Hinote (2)	Ville Nieminen (6) and Chris Drury (5)	06:28	3–1 COL
Penalty summary
Period	Team	Player	Penalty	Time	PIM
1st	COL	Adam Foote	Tripping	01:29	2:00
1st	COL	Stephane Yelle	Interference	06:28	2:00
1st	NJ	Sergei Brylin	Interference	14:29	2:00
1st	COL	Alex Tanguay	Hooking	15:03	2:00
1st	COL	Ville Nieminen	Boarding	16:29	2:00
2nd	NJ	Sean O'Donnell	Cross-checking	02:40	2:00
2nd	NJ	Sean O'Donnell	Holding	08:25	2:00
2nd	COL	Adam Foote	Tripping	14:52	2:00
2nd	NJ	Jason Arnott	Boarding	19:02	2:00
3rd	COL	Jon Klemm	Holding	08:22	2:00

Shots by period
Team	1	2	3	Total
Colorado	5	11	5	21
New Jersey	8	3	11	22

=== Game four ===
June 2	Colorado Avalanche	2–3	New Jersey Devils	Continental Airlines Arena	Recap

In the first period of game four, Colorado scored an early goal when Rob Blake shot the puck past Devils goaltender Martin Brodeur. Patrik Elias and New Jersey responded when he scored a short-handed goal to even the score at one goal apiece. Later in the second, Avalanche centre Chris Drury scored to give the Avalanche a one-goal lead going into the third period. But the third period belonged to the Devils: Scott Gomez and Petr Sykora each scored a goal in the third, and Brodeur stopped every puck that went his way. The New Jersey offence overwhelmed the Avalanche defence as they managed 35 shots; Colorado managed only 12 shots. New Jersey again evened the series, this time at two games apiece.

Scoring summary
Period	Team	Goal	Assist(s)	Time	Score
1st	COL	Rob Blake (6)	Alex Tanguay (14)	03:58	1–0 COL
2nd	NJ	Patrik Elias (8) – sh	Petr Sykora (11)	03:42	1–1
2nd	COL	Chris Drury (10)	Chris Dingman (4) and Dan Hinote (3)	13:54	2–1 COL
3rd	NJ	Scott Gomez (5)	Jay Pandolfo (4) and Bob Corkum (2)	08:09	2–2
3rd	NJ	Petr Sykora (9)	Patrik Elias (4) and Bobby Holik (10)	17:23	3–2 NJ
Penalty summary
Period	Team	Player	Penalty	Time	PIM
1st	NJ	Turner Stevenson	Interference	01:36	2:00
1st	NJ	Scott Gomez	Goaltender interference	04:42	2:00
1st	COL	Stephane Yelle	Embellishment	07:15	2:00
1st	NJ	Petr Sykora	Hooking	07:15	2:00
1st	NJ	Scott Stevens	Hooking	07:42	2:00
1st	COL	Joe Sakic	Hooking	08:26	2:00
2nd	NJ	Colin White	Roughing	02:18	2:00
2nd	COL	Martin Skoula	Interference	08:25	2:00
2nd	NJ	Turner Stevenson	Tripping	14:52	2:00
3rd	None				

Shots by period
Team	1	2	3	Total
Colorado	4	4	4	12
New Jersey	8	11	16	35

=== Game five ===
June 4	New Jersey Devils	4–1	Colorado Avalanche	Pepsi Center	Recap

In Colorado for game five, Devils forward Patrik Elias started the scoring for the Devils as they jumped out to an early one-goal lead. Exactly seven minutes later, Colorado winger Alex Tanguay tied the game on the power-play. However, in the late minutes of the first period, New Jersey forward Alexander Mogilny scored the game's eventual winner. In the second period, Devils forward Sergei Brylin scored a power-play goal to give the Devils a two-goal lead, and in the third period, centre John Madden scored a fourth goal for insurance. The Devils won and reclaimed the home-ice advantage; they eventually won 4–1. They forced the Avalanche to try to win on the road to force a Game 7 in Denver.

Scoring summary
Period	Team	Goal	Assist(s)	Time	Score
1st	NJ	Patrik Elias (9)	Petr Sykora (12) and Brian Rafalski (10)	03:09	1–0 NJ
1st	COL	Alex Tanguay (3) – pp	Joe Sakic (11) and Ray Bourque (6)	10:09	1–1
1st	NJ	Alexander Mogilny (5)	Scott Gomez (11) and Brian Rafalski (11)	18:47	2–1 NJ
2nd	NJ	Sergei Brylin (3)	Alexander Mogilny (11) and Scott Niedermayer (6)	04:39	3–1 NJ
3rd	NJ	John Madden (4)	Turner Stevenson (3) and Sergei Brylin (4)	18:05	4–1 NJ
Penalty summary
Period	Team	Player	Penalty	Time	PIM
1st	NJ	Bobby Holik	Tripping	08:56	2:00
1st	NJ	Bench (served by Scott Gomez)	Too many men on the ice	19:24	2:00
2nd	COL	Rob Blake	Interference	03:53	2:00
2nd	NJ	Scott Niedermayer	Interference	16:33	2:00
3rd	COL	Adam Foote	Roughing	10:11	2:00
3rd	NJ	Scott Stevens	Roughing	10:11	2:00
3rd	NJ	Jim McKenzie	Holding	12:54	2:00
3rd	COL	Dan Hinote	Roughing	20:00	2:00
3rd	NJ	Ken Sutton	Roughing	20:00	2:00

Shots by period
Team	1	2	3	Total
New Jersey	6	10	10	26
Colorado	6	9	8	23

=== Game six ===
June 7	Colorado Avalanche	4–0	New Jersey Devils	Continental Airlines Arena	Recap

Game six paralleled game one for the Avalanche. The Devils tested the Avalanche early with a barrage of shots on goaltender Patrick Roy. After stopping them all, and with two minutes remaining in the first period, Colorado defenceman Adam Foote scored an unassisted goal to give the Avalanche the lead on just their fourth shot. Early in the second period, Avalanche winger Ville Nieminen scored a power-play goal, and late in the second period, Drury scored his 11th goal of the playoffs to give the Avalanche a commanding lead entering the third period. Alex Tanguay scored the only goal of the third period and the Avalanche won to force a deciding game seven in Denver. Late in the third period, tensions boiled over and fights broke out. Despite New Jersey outshooting Colorado and Colorado's high number of penalty minutes, the Devils were unable to put anything past Roy, who made 24 saves to record his fourth shutout of the postseason, and his second shutout of the Cup Final.

Scoring summary
Period	Team	Goal	Assist(s)	Time	Score
1st	COL	Adam Foote (3)	Unassisted	18:02	1–0 COL
2nd	COL	Ville Nieminen (4) – pp	Martin Skoula (11) and Adam Foote (2)	02:26	2–0 COL
2nd	COL	Chris Drury (11)	Steven Reinprecht (3) and Adam Foote (3)	18:27	3–0 COL
3rd	COL	Alex Tanguay (4)	Dave Reid (4) and Joe Sakic (12)	13:46	4–0 COL
Penalty summary
Period	Team	Player	Penalty	Time	PIM
1st	COL	Dave Reid	Holding the stick – Obstruction	05:22	2:00
1st	COL	Adam Foote	Hooking	07:20	2:00
1st	NJ	Alexander Mogilny	Hooking	09:12	2:00
1st	COL	Martin Skoula	Hooking	11:08	2:00
2nd	NJ	Bobby Holik	Roughing	00:29	2:00
2nd	COL	Bench (served by Ville Nieminen)	Too many men on the ice	08:35	2:00
2nd	NJ	Scott Niedermayer	Holding	11:10	2:00
2nd	COL	Ray Bourque	Hooking – Obstruction	13:01	2:00
3rd	COL	Shjon Podein	Interference	03:24	2:00
3rd	NJ	Scott Niedermayer	Slashing	08:26	2:00
3rd	NJ	Colin White	Slashing	17:27	2:00
3rd	COL	Dan Hinote	Fighting – major	18:19	5:00
3rd	NJ	Ken Sutton	Roughing	18:19	2:00
3rd	NJ	Ken Sutton	Fighting – major	18:19	5:00
3rd	NJ	Colin White	High-sticking	19:43	2:00
3rd	COL	Chris Dingman	Fighting – major	19:48	5:00
3rd	NJ	Ken Daneyko	Fighting – major	19:48	5:00

Shots by period
Team	1	2	3	Total
Colorado	5	7	6	18
New Jersey	12	7	5	24

=== Game seven ===
June 9	New Jersey Devils	1–3	Colorado Avalanche	Pepsi Center	Recap

Around eight minutes into game seven, Alex Tanguay of the Avalanche scored the period's only goal. Colorado then scored two consecutive goals in the second period: another by Tanguay, his sixth of the playoffs, and a power-play goal scored by Joe Sakic, his 13th of the playoffs. Shortly after Sakic's goal, Petr Sykora and the Devils sprang into life when he scored a power-play goal. It left the Devils with only two goals to overcome, but Roy and the Avalanche would prove too much for the Devils in the third period as Colorado defensively shut the door on New Jersey to win the game and the series.

Scoring summary
Period	Team	Goal	Assist(s)	Time	Score
1st	COL	Alex Tanguay (5)	Dan Hinote (4)	07:58	1–0 COL
2nd	COL	Alex Tanguay (6)	Joe Sakic (13) and Adam Foote (4)	04:57	2–0 COL
2nd	COL	Joe Sakic (13) – pp	Milan Hejduk (16) and Alex Tanguay (15)	06:16	3–0 COL
2nd	NJ	Petr Sykora (10) – pp	Patrik Elias (14) and Jason Arnott (15)	09:33	3–1 COL
3rd	None				
Penalty summary
Period	Team	Player	Penalty	Time	PIM
1st	NJ	Sergei Brylin	Boarding	03:20	2:00
1st	NJ	Scott Gomez	Holding	16:06	2:00
2nd	NJ	Sean O'Donnell	High-sticking	05:51	2:00
2nd	COL	Eric Messier	High-sticking	09:22	2:00
2nd	COL	Eric Messier	Holding	12:23	2:00
2nd	NJ	Jason Arnott	Tripping	12:23	2:00
3rd	COL	Rob Blake	Interference	04:59	2:00
3rd	NJ	Colin White	High-sticking	10:32	2:00
3rd	COL	Adam Foote	Holding the stick	12:11	2:00
3rd	NJ	Scott Stevens	Tripping	14:42	2:00

Shots by period
Team	1	2	3	Total
New Jersey	9	12	5	26
Colorado	10	7	5	22

With the win, the Avalanche became the fifth team to win the Presidents' Trophy and Stanley Cup in the same season since the former trophy's introduction in 1985–86. To date, only three more Presidents' Trophy winners have gone on to win the Stanley Cup. They are the Detroit Red Wings in both the 2001–02 and 2007–08 seasons, and the Chicago Blackhawks in the lockout-shortened 2012–13 season.

The Devils' series loss marked the second straight season that the defending Stanley Cup champion lost in the Final, as the Devils themselves defeated the 1999 Stanley Cup champion Dallas Stars in the 2000 Stanley Cup Final. The Devils would appear in the Final again in 2003, when they defeated the Mighty Ducks of Anaheim in seven games.

This was the first and only Stanley Cup championship for defenceman Ray Bourque, who retired shortly after the series ended. His number 77 would be retired by both the Avalanche and Boston Bruins (the team he played for from 1979 to 2000). To date, he is one of only nine NHL players to have his number retired by more than one team.

This was the last major professional sports championship won by a Denver-based team until 2016, when the Denver Broncos won Super Bowl 50 in the 2015 NFL season. This would also be the Avalanche's last Stanley Cup title and Final appearance until 2022, when they defeated the two-time defending Stanley Cup champion Tampa Bay Lightning in six games.

== Team rosters ==
Years indicated in boldface under the "Final appearance" column signify that the player won the Stanley Cup in the given year.

=== Colorado Avalanche ===
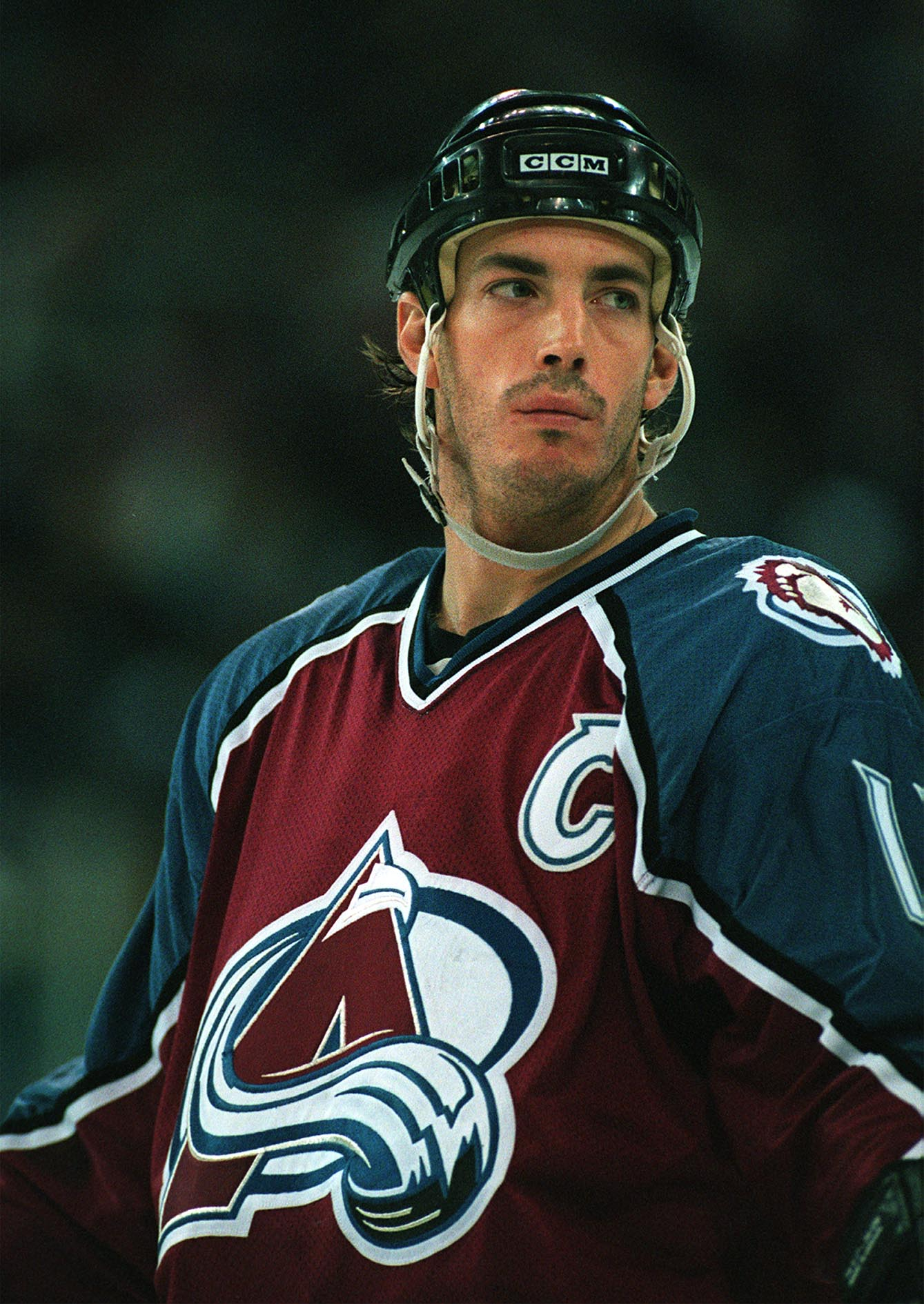
Joe Sakic captained the Avalanche to the Final for the first time since 1996.

#	Nat	Player	Position	Hand	Acquired	Place of birth	Final appearance
1	(Switzerland)	David Aebischer	G	L	1997	Fribourg, Switzerland	first (did not play)
4	(Canada)	Rob Blake	D	R	2000–01	Simcoe, Ontario	second (1993)
77	(Canada)	Ray Bourque – **A**	D	L	2000	Saint-Laurent, Quebec	third (1988, 1990)
7	(Canada)	Greg de Vries	D	L	1998–99	Sundridge, Ontario	first
11	(Canada)	Chris Dingman	LW	L	1998–99	Edmonton, Alberta	first
37	(United States)	Chris Drury	C/RW	R	1994	Trumbull, Connecticut	first
52	(Canada)	Adam Foote – **A**	D	R	1989	Toronto, Ontario	second (**1996**)
21	(Sweden)	Peter Forsberg – **A**	C/LW	L	1992–93	Örnsköldsvik, Sweden	second (**1996**; did not play)
23	(Czech Republic)	Milan Hejduk	RW	R	1994	Ústí nad Labem, Czechoslovakia	first
13	(United States)	Dan Hinote	RW/C	R	1996	Leesburg, Florida	first
24	(Canada)	Jon Klemm	D	R	1991–92	Cranbrook, British Columbia	second (**1996**)
29	(Canada)	Eric Messier	LW	L	1996–97	Drummondville, Quebec	first
2	(Canada)	Bryan Muir	D	L	2000–01	Winnipeg, Manitoba	first (did not play)
39	(Finland)	Ville Nieminen	LW	L	1997	Tampere, Finland	first
27	(United States)	Scott Parker	RW	R	1998	Hanford, California	first (did not play)
25	(United States)	Shjon Podein	LW	L	1998–99	Rochester, Minnesota	second (1997)
44	(Canada)	Nolan Pratt	D	L	2000–01	Fort McMurray, Alberta	first (did not play)
14	(Canada)	Dave Reid	LW	L	1999–2000	Etobicoke, Ontario	second (**1999**)
28	(Canada)	Steven Reinprecht	C/W	L	2000–01	Edmonton, Alberta	first
33	(Canada)	Patrick Roy	G	L	1995–96	Quebec City, Quebec	fifth (**1986**, 1989, **1993**, **1996**)
19	(Canada)	Joe Sakic – **C**	C	L	1987	Burnaby, British Columbia	second (**1996**)
41	(Czech Republic)	Martin Skoula	D	L	1998	Litoměřice, Czechoslovakia	first
40	(Canada)	Alex Tanguay	LW	L	1998	Sainte-Justine, Quebec	first
26	(Canada)	Stephane Yelle	C	L	1994–95	Ottawa, Ontario	second (**1996**)

=== New Jersey Devils ===
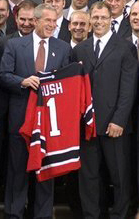
Scott Stevens (pictured in 2003) captained the Devils to the Final for the second consecutive season.

#	Nat	Player	Position	Hand	Acquired	Place of birth	Final appearance
25	(Canada)	Jason Arnott – **A**	C	R	1997–98	Collingwood, Ontario	second (**2000**)
30	(Canada)	Martin Brodeur	G	L	1990	Montreal, Quebec	third (**1995**, **2000**)
18	(Russia)	Sergei Brylin	LW	L	1992	Moscow, Soviet Union	third (**1995**, **2000**)
22	(United States)	Bob Corkum	C	R	2000–01	Salisbury, Massachusetts	first
3	(Canada)	Ken Daneyko	D	L	1982	Windsor, Ontario	third (**1995**, **2000**)
26	(Czech Republic)	Patrik Elias	LW	L	1994	Třebíč, Czechoslovakia	second (**2000**)
23	(United States)	Scott Gomez	C	L	1998	Anchorage, Alaska	second (**2000**)
16	(Czech Republic)	Bobby Holik	LW	R	1992–93	Jihlava, Czechoslovakia	third (**1995**, **2000**)
11	(Canada)	John Madden	C	L	1997–98	Toronto, Ontario	second (**2000**)
21	(Canada)	Randy McKay – **A**	RW	R	1991–92	Montreal, Quebec	third (**1995**, **2000**)
19	(Canada)	Jim McKenzie	LW	L	2000–01	Gull Lake, Saskatchewan	first (did not play)
89	(Russia)	Alexander Mogilny	RW	L	1999–2000	Khabarovsk, Soviet Union	second (**2000**)
12	(Russia)	Sergei Nemchinov	C	L	1998–99	Moscow, Soviet Union	third (**1994**, **2000**; did not play)
27	(Canada)	Scott Niedermayer	D	L	1991	Edmonton, Alberta	third (**1995**, **2000**)
6	(Canada)	Sean O'Donnell	D	L	2000–01	Ottawa, Ontario	first
20	(United States)	Jay Pandolfo	LW	L	1993	Winchester, Massachusetts	second (**2000**)
28	(United States)	Brian Rafalski	D	R	1999–2000	Dearborn, Michigan	second (**2000**)
4	(Canada)	Scott Stevens – **C**	D	L	1991–92	Kitchener, Ontario	third (**1995**, **2000**)
24	(Canada)	Turner Stevenson	RW	R	2000–01	Prince George, British Columbia	first
2	(Canada)	Ken Sutton	D	L	1998–99	Edmonton, Alberta	first (did not play)
17	(Czech Republic)	Petr Sykora	RW	L	1995	Plzeň, Czechoslovakia	second (**2000**)
34	(United States)	John Vanbiesbrouck	G	L	2000–01	Detroit, Michigan	second (1996; did not play)
5	(Canada)	Colin White	D	L	1996	New Glasgow, Nova Scotia	second (**2000**)

== Stanley Cup engraving ==
The 2001 Stanley Cup was presented to Avalanche captain Joe Sakic by NHL Commissioner Gary Bettman following the Avalanche's 3–1 win over the Devils in game seven. Although the normal tradition dictates that the captain skates with the cup first, in a gesture of class by Sakic, he kept the cup under his waist and handed it to Bourque, who skated with it first, in what is widely considered to be one of the most emotional moments in NHL history.

The following Avalanche players and staff had their names engraved on the Stanley Cup:

2000–01 Colorado Avalanche

=== Players ===
Centres

- 19 Joe Sakic (Captain)
- 21 Peter Forsberg* (A)†
- 26 Stephane Yelle
- 28 Steven Reinprecht*
- 37 Chris Drury*

Wingers

- 11 Chris Dingman
- 13 Dan Hinote*
- 14 Dave Reid
- 23 Milan Hejduk
- 25 Shjon Podein
- 27 Scott Parker †
- 29 Eric Messier
- 39 Ville Nieminen
- 40 Alex Tanguay

Defencemen

- 2 Bryan Muir ‡
- 4 Rob Blake
- 7 Greg de Vries
- 24 Jon Klemm
- 41 Martin Skoula
- 44 Nolan Pratt †
- 52 Adam Foote (A)
- 77 Ray Bourque (A)

Goaltenders

- 1 David Aebischer
- 33 Patrick Roy
- * Played both centre and wing.
- † Did not play or dress in the Final. (Note: No. 21 Peter Forsberg (C/LW) missed the rest of the season due to a ruptured spleen that occurred in the second round of the playoffs. He underwent a splenectomy on May 10, 2001.)
- ‡ Exemption granted to engrave the name of a player who did not automatically qualify. (Note: Automatic qualification for a player's name to be engraved on the Stanley Cup: Playing in (for a goaltender, dressing for) at least one Stanley Cup Final game or at least half of regular season games for the Stanley Cup winning team.)

=== Coaching and administrative staff ===
- E. Stanley Kroenke (owner/governor/chairman), Pierre Lacroix (president/general manager), Bob Hartley (head coach)
- Jacques Cloutier (goaltending coach), Bryan Trottier (assistant coach), Paul Fixter (video coach)
- Francois Giguere (vice president of hockey operations), Brian MacDonald (assistant general manager), Michel Goulet (vice president of player personnel)
- Jean Martineau (vice president-communications and team service), Pat Karns (athletic therapist), Matthew Sokolowski (assistant athletic therapist)
- Wayne Flemming (equipment manager), Mark Miller (equipment manager), Dave Randolph (assistqnt equipment manager)
- Paul Goldberg (strength-conditioning coach), Gregorio Pradera (massage therapist), Brad Smith (pro scout)
- Jim Hammett (chief scout), Garth Joy (scout), Steve Lyons (scout),
- Joni Lehto (scout), Orval Tessier (scout), Charlotte Grahame (director of hockey operations)

=== Engraving notes ===
- No. 2 Bryan Muir (D) – played in eight regular season games (previously ten games for the Tampa Bay Lightning) and three playoff games. As he did not automatically qualify, Colorado successfully requested an exemption to engrave his name.
- Six players also won the Stanley Cup with Colorado in 1996: Joe Sakic, Peter Forsberg, Jon Klemm, Stephane Yelle, Patrick Roy and Adam Foote.
- David Aebischer was the first player born and trained in Switzerland to win the Stanley Cup.

== Broadcasting ==
In Canada, the series was televised on CBC. In the United States, ESPN aired the first two games while ABC broadcast the rest of the series.

== See also ==
- 2000–01 NHL season

== Notes ==
Preceded by New Jersey Devils; 2000	Colorado Avalanche; Stanley Cup champions 2001	Succeeded by Detroit Red Wings; 2002
