= Chris Dingman =

Canadian ice hockey player (born 1976)

- Born: July 6, 1976 (age 50) Edmonton, Alberta, Canada
- Height: 6 ft 3 in (191 cm)
- Weight: 243 lb (110 kg; 17 st 5 lb)
- Position: Left wing
- Shot: Left
- Played for: Calgary Flames; Colorado Avalanche; Carolina Hurricanes; Tampa Bay Lightning
- NHL draft: 19th overall, 1994; Calgary Flames
- Playing career: 1996–2008

Christopher Robert Dingman (born July 6, 1976) is a Canadian former professional ice hockey player. He played in the National Hockey League with the Calgary Flames, Colorado Avalanche, Carolina Hurricanes and the Tampa Bay Lightning.

== Playing career ==
Dingman played junior hockey for the Brandon Wheat Kings of the Western Hockey League, and served as that team's captain when they won the WHL Championship during the 1995–96 season. In his best campaign (1994–95) he scored 40 goals and totalled 83 points in 66 games, while also amassing 201 minutes in penalties, making him a multiple threat.

Dingman, or "Dinger" as he is known colloquially, was drafted by the Calgary Flames of the National Hockey League (19th overall in the 1994 NHL Entry Draft), and played his first full NHL season for the Flames in 1997–98, where he earned a reputation as a tough customer and found himself involved as a checker and a pugilist as opposed to a scoring line player.

During the 1998–99 season, he was included in the Theoren Fleury trade to the Colorado Avalanche in a multiplayer swap that saw him trade places with fellow combatant and old nemesis from the WHL, Wade Belak. Dingman plied his trade with the Avalanche for three seasons and won a Stanley Cup.

After winning a Stanley Cup, he ended up with the Carolina Hurricanes.

He was then dealt to the Tampa Bay Lightning in 2002. While he saw only limited action in his first campaign there, he gradually earned more and more ice time and in 2004, Dingman won another Stanley Cup with the Lightning.

He was scratched for the last two Lightning/Senators games of the 2006 Stanley Cup Playoffs after earning a seven-minute Ottawa powerplay after challenging Chris Neil, but Neil turtled when Dingman started punching him, leading to a fighting, instigator, and game misconduct penalties. Dingman never played again in the NHL.

Dingman totaled 120 fights in his NHL career. His most notable was his beatdown of Bryce Salvador in November, 2000. At one point in the fight, both Dingman and Salvador had their right fists cocked, squared up, and simultaneously threw a punch. Salvador's punch missed while Dingman's punch connected with Salvador's jaw and sent Salvador's mouthpiece flying out of his mouth. Salvador crumpled to the ice, proving to be one of the most dynamic victories of Dingman's career.

In November 2006 he was acquired by Södertälje SK, in Sweden. He played 2007 for AaB Ishockey of the Oddset Ligaen in Denmark.

Dingman performed as a color commentator for the Tampa Bay Lightning on the Sun Sports network. During the 2016 season, he wasn't expected to return in that role.

== Career statistics ==
			Regular season					Playoffs
Season	Team	League	GP	G	A	Pts	PIM	GP	G	A	Pts	PIM
1992–93	Brandon Wheat Kings	WHL	50	10	17	27	64	4	0	0	0	0
1993–94	Brandon Wheat Kings	WHL	45	21	20	41	77	13	1	7	8	39
1994–95	Brandon Wheat Kings	WHL	66	40	43	83	201	3	1	0	1	9
1995–96	Brandon Wheat Kings	WHL	40	16	29	45	109	19	12	11	23	60
1995–96	Saint John Flames	AHL	—	—	—	—	—	1	0	0	0	0
1996–97	Saint John Flames	AHL	71	5	6	11	195	—	—	—	—	—
1997–98	Calgary Flames	NHL	70	3	3	6	149	—	—	—	—	—
1998–99	Saint John Flames	AHL	50	5	7	12	140	—	—	—	—	—
1998–99	Calgary Flames	NHL	2	0	0	0	17	—	—	—	—	—
1998–99	Hershey Bears	AHL	17	1	3	4	102	5	0	2	2	6
1998–99	Colorado Avalanche	NHL	1	0	0	0	7	—	—	—	—	—
1999–2000	Colorado Avalanche	NHL	68	8	3	11	132	—	—	—	—	—
2000–01	Colorado Avalanche	NHL	41	1	1	2	108	16	0	4	4	14
2001–02	Carolina Hurricanes	NHL	30	0	1	1	77	—	—	—	—	—
2001–02	Tampa Bay Lightning	NHL	14	0	4	4	26	—	—	—	—	—
2002–03	Tampa Bay Lightning	NHL	51	2	1	3	91	10	1	0	1	4
2003–04	Tampa Bay Lightning	NHL	74	1	5	6	140	23	1	1	2	63
2005–06	Tampa Bay Lightning	NHL	34	0	1	1	22	3	0	0	0	19
2005–06	Springfield Falcons	AHL	27	8	8	16	30	—	—	—	—	—
2006–07	Södertälje SK	SWE.2	27	6	10	16	76	10	0	0	0	4
2007–08	AaB Ishockey	DNK	24	11	6	17	36	5	2	0	2	4
AHL totals			165	19	24	43	467	6	0	2	2	6
NHL totals			385	15	19	34	769	52	2	5	7	100

== Awards and honors ==
Award	Year	Ref
NHL
Stanley Cup champion	2001, 2004	

Awards and achievements
Preceded by Jesper Mattsson	Calgary Flames' first-round draft pick 1994	Succeeded by Denis Gauthier
