= Ville Nieminen =

Finnish ice hockey player (born 1977)

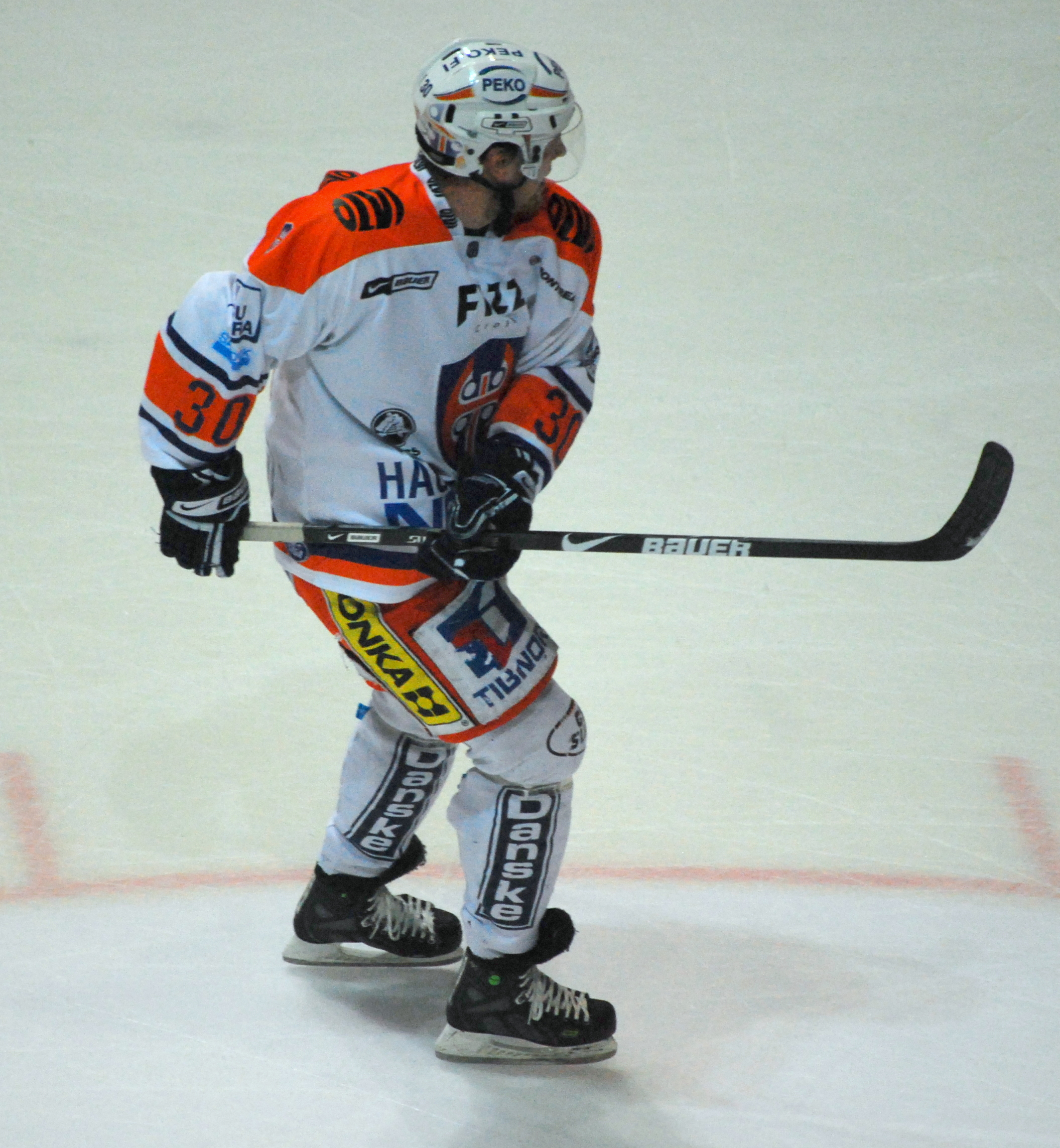
- Nieminen with Tappara in 2008
- Born: 6 April 1977 (age 49) Tampere, Finland
- Height: 6 ft 1 in (185 cm)
- Weight: 200 lb (91 kg; 14 st 4 lb)
- Position: Left Wing
- Shot: Left
- Played for: Tappara; Colorado Avalanche; Pittsburgh Penguins; Chicago Blackhawks; Calgary Flames; New York Rangers; San Jose Sharks; St. Louis Blues; HC Sibir Novosibirsk; Neftekhimik Nizhnekamsk; Dinamo Riga; Lukko
- National team: Finland
- NHL draft: 78th overall, 1997; Colorado Avalanche
- Playing career: 1999–2015

Ville Juhani Nieminen (born April 6, 1977) is a Finnish former professional ice hockey forward who played over 400 games in the National Hockey League.

== Playing career ==
Stanley Cup Champion Ville Nieminen started his professional hockey career with Tappara in the Finnish SM-liiga, in the 1994–95 season. He was drafted by the Colorado Avalanche as their third-round pick, #78 overall, in the 1997 NHL entry draft. Nieminen spent three seasons in the AHL with the Hershey Bears before moving to the NHL.

Known for his non-stop motor mouth and aggressive in-your-face style of play, Nieminen was infamous as an annoying opponent on the ice, whose style was heavily reminiscent of Esa Tikkanen. Nieminen was also known for a relaxed personality and his trademark odd sense of humour outside the rink.

Nieminen played for several teams in the NHL. Notably, he was a part of the Colorado Avalanche 2001 Stanley Cup winning team, putting up 10 points and 20 PIM in their playoff run. He spent the 2004–05 lockout season playing for his home team, Tappara. He signed with the New York Rangers for the 2005–06 NHL season and was traded to San Jose on March 8, 2006.

He represented Finland in international play at the 2004 World Cup of Hockey, and when he was unable to compete at the 2005 IIHF World Championships, he provided commentary on Finnish television with fellow NHL player Tuomo Ruutu. Ville is a popular colour commentator due to his sense of humour and knowledge of the game.

On February 27, 2007, he was traded to the St. Louis Blues. His contract expired in July, and he signed a two-year contract with the Malmö Redhawks, then of the Swedish Allsvenskan. After a single season Nieminen returned to his native land signing with his original club Tappara of the SM-liiga.

On June 16, 2010, Nieminen signed a one-year contract with Russian team, HC Sibir Novosibirsk, of the KHL. On May 6, 2011, Nieminen signed a one-year deal to remain in Russia Neftekhimik Nizhnekamsk. During the 2011–12 season, Nieminen remained unsettled, and moved twice in stints with Dinamo Riga and Örebro HK of the HockeyAllsvenskan.

Nieminen returned to Finland the following season, re-joining original club, Tappara on a two-year deal on May 2, 2012. During the 2012–13 season, Nieminen enjoyed a scoring resurgence, leading the team with 22 goals and 50 points in a second place regular season finish. He helped Tappara to a silver medal finish in the playoffs, leading the league with 41 penalty minutes.

Nieminen played a final professional season in 2014–15 with Lukko, scoring 14 points in 50 games, before opting to pursue a coaching career as head coach with Mestis club KeuPa.

== Coaching career ==
- KeuPa HT 2015–2016, Mestis.
- Jukurit 2016–2018, Liiga.
- Lahti Pelicans 2018–2020, Liiga.
- Modo Hockey 2020–, HockeyAllsvenskan.

== Career statistics ==
=== Regular season and playoffs ===
			Regular season					Playoffs
Season	Team	League	GP	G	A	Pts	PIM	GP	G	A	Pts	PIM
1993–94	Tappara	FIN.18	29	13	20	33	66	5	1	2	3	0
1994–95	Tappara	FIN.18	15	14	18	32	58	7	2	16	18	22
1994–95	Tappara	FIN.2 U20	12	10	17	27	30	4	1	4	5	27
1994–95	Tappara	SM-l	16	0	0	0	0	—	—	—	—	—
1995–96	Tappara	FIN.2 U20	6	9	10	19	29	14	11	13	24	34
1995–96	Tappara	SM-l	4	0	1	1	8	—	—	—	—	—
1995–96	KOOVEE	I.div	7	2	1	3	4	—	—	—	—	—
1996–97	Tappara	SM-l	49	10	13	23	120	3	1	0	1	8
1997–98	Hershey Bears	AHL	74	14	22	36	85	—	—	—	—	—
1998–99	Hershey Bears	AHL	67	24	19	43	127	3	1	0	1	0
1999–00	Hershey Bears	AHL	74	21	30	51	54	—	—	—	—	—
1999–00	Colorado Avalanche	NHL	1	0	0	0	0	—	—	—	—	—
2000–01	Hershey Bears	AHL	28	10	11	21	48	—	—	—	—	—
2000–01	Colorado Avalanche	NHL	50	14	8	22	38	23	4	6	10	20
2001–02	Colorado Avalanche	NHL	53	10	14	24	30	—	—	—	—	—
2001–02	Pittsburgh Penguins	NHL	13	1	2	3	8	—	—	—	—	—
2002–03	Pittsburgh Penguins	NHL	75	9	12	21	93	—	—	—	—	—
2003–04	Chicago Blackhawks	NHL	60	2	11	13	40	—	—	—	—	—
2003–04	Calgary Flames	NHL	19	3	5	8	18	24	4	4	8	55
2004–05	Tappara	SM-l	26	14	13	27	32	8	2	4	6	12
2005–06	New York Rangers	NHL	48	5	12	17	53	—	—	—	—	—
2005–06	San Jose Sharks	NHL	22	3	4	7	10	11	0	2	2	24
2006–07	San Jose Sharks	NHL	30	1	1	2	14	—	—	—	—	—
2006–07	St. Louis Blues	NHL	14	0	0	0	29	—	—	—	—	—
2007–08	Malmö Redhawks	Allsv	34	9	15	24	124	10	2	4	6	10
2008–09	Tappara	SM-l	55	22	20	42	82	—	—	—	—	—
2009–10	Tappara	SM-l	50	15	14	29	142	9	3	3	6	16
2010–11	Sibir Novosibirsk	KHL	53	12	23	35	62	4	1	1	2	0
2011–12	Neftekhimik Nizhnekamsk	KHL	6	1	0	1	4	—	—	—	—	—
2011–12	Dinamo Riga	KHL	16	0	1	1	14	—	—	—	—	—
2011–12	Örebro HK	Allsv	15	4	5	9	16	6	0	0	0	2
2012–13	Tappara	SM-l	57	22	28	50	132	15	3	3	6	41
2013–14	Tappara	Liiga	55	7	15	22	115	17	3	3	6	12
2014–15	Lukko	Liiga	50	4	10	14	28	13	0	3	3	2
Liiga totals			362	94	114	208	659	65	12	16	28	91
NHL totals			385	48	69	117	333	58	8	12	20	99

=== International ===
Medal record

Men's ice hockey

Representing Finland

Olympic Games
Silver medal – second place	2006 Turin	

World Cup
Silver medal – second place	2004 Toronto	

Year	Team	Event	Result	GP	G	A	Pts	PIM
1997	Finland	WJC	5th	6	2	5	7	2
2002	Finland	OG	6th	4	0	1	1	2
2004	Finland	WCH	2nd place, silver medalist(s)	2	0	0	0	0
2006	Finland	OG	2nd place, silver medalist(s)	8	0	1	1	4
Junior totals				6	2	5	7	2
Senior totals				14	0	2	2	6

== Awards and honours ==
Award	Year
NHL
Stanley Cup champion	2001
Liiga
Kanada-malja Runner-up	2013, 2014
