= Stéphane Yelle =

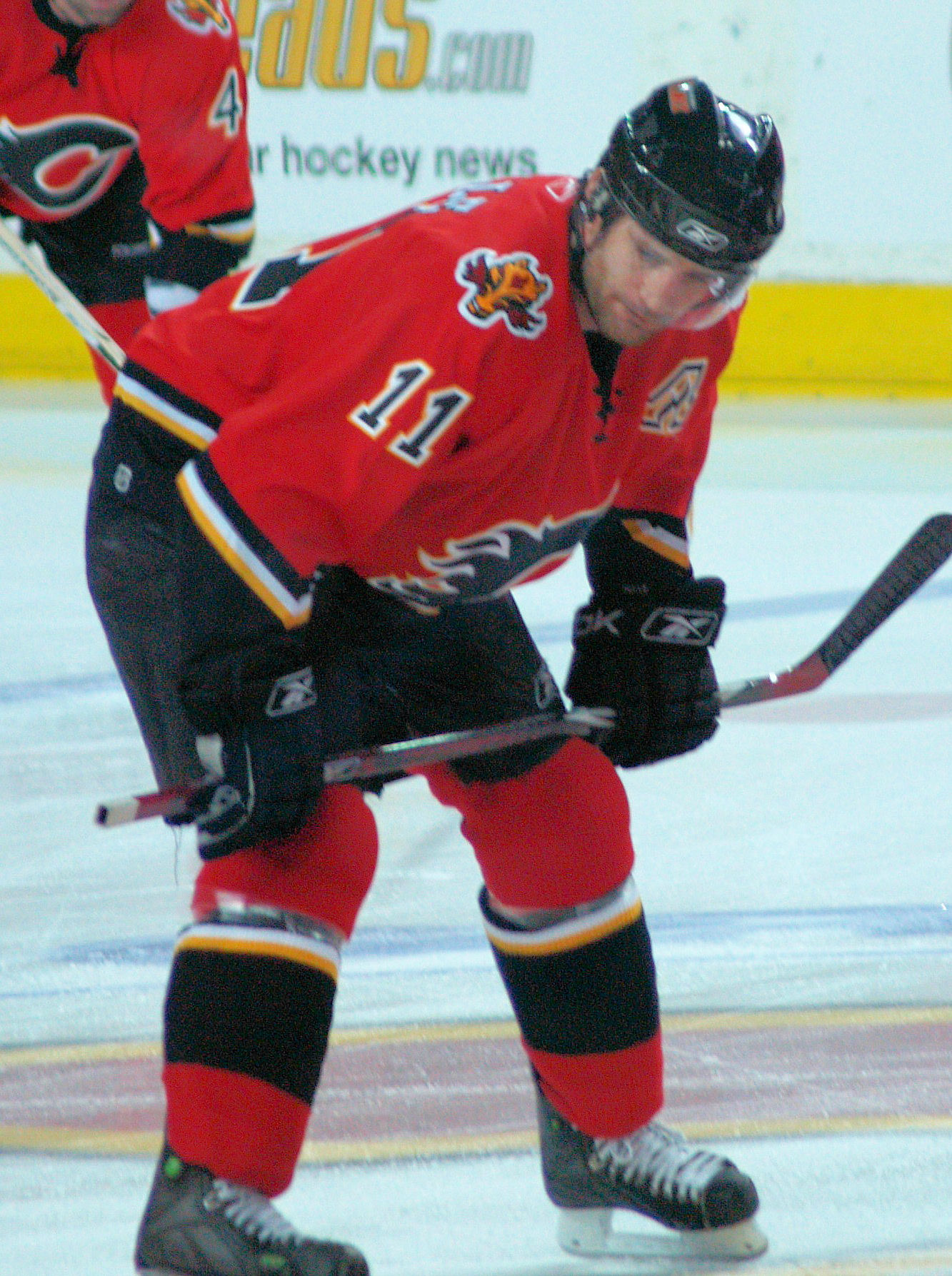
- Yelle with the Calgary Flames in 2007
- Born: May 9, 1974 (age 52) Ottawa, Ontario, Canada
- Height: 6 ft 1 in (185 cm)
- Weight: 196 lb (89 kg; 14 st 0 lb)
- Position: Centre
- Shot: Left
- Played for: Colorado Avalanche; Calgary Flames; Boston Bruins; Carolina Hurricanes
- NHL draft: 186th overall, 1992; New Jersey Devils
- Playing career: 1994–2010

Stéphane A. Yelle (born May 9, 1974) is a Canadian former professional ice hockey centre who played in the National Hockey League (NHL) with the Colorado Avalanche, Calgary Flames, Boston Bruins and the Carolina Hurricanes.

He is a two-time Stanley Cup champion, having won with Colorado in 1996 and 2001.

== Playing career ==
Yelle played with the Oshawa Generals in the Ontario Hockey League when he was drafted in the 8th round (186th overall) in the 1992 NHL entry draft by the New Jersey Devils. On June 1, 1994, he was traded to the Quebec Nordiques, and made his professional debut in the 1994–95 season with AHL affiliate, the Cornwall Aces.

The following season, Yelle's rights were transferred as the Nordiques relocated to Denver to become the Colorado Avalanche. In 1995–96, his and the Avalanche's first season in the NHL, Yelle became a regular as he played in 71 games en route to the Stanley Cup Championship. Known as an excellent faceoff taker and a gritty, hard-working player, Yelle played seven seasons for the Avalanche from 1995 to 2002, capturing another Stanley Cup in the 2000–01 season.

On October 1, 2002, prior to the 2002–03 season, Stéphane was traded by the Avalanche, along with Chris Drury, to the Calgary Flames for Derek Morris, Dean McAmmond and Jeff Shantz. Yelle's transition was seamless as he established himself on the Flames checking line, helping Calgary to a 2004 Stanley Cup Final appearance after a seven-year playoff hiatus. Throughout his five seasons with the Flames, Yelle's versatility and defensive prowess was often highlighted as he would often fill-in as a defenseman when others were out injured.

On September 3, 2008, Yelle was signed to a one-year deal with the Boston Bruins. In 2007–08, the veteran played in 51 games scoring 12 points with the Eastern Conference leading Bruins.

On August 19, 2009, he signed a one-year contract with the Carolina Hurricanes. After a slow start to the 2009–10 season, the struggling Hurricanes placed Yelle on waivers on October 26, 2009. He went unclaimed and progressively found his feet, staying on the roster.

On March 3, 2010, Yelle was traded by the Hurricanes, along with Harrison Reed, back to the Colorado Avalanche for Cedric Lalonde-McNicoll and a sixth-round draft pick. He has since retired and taken a development coordinator position with the Avalanche.

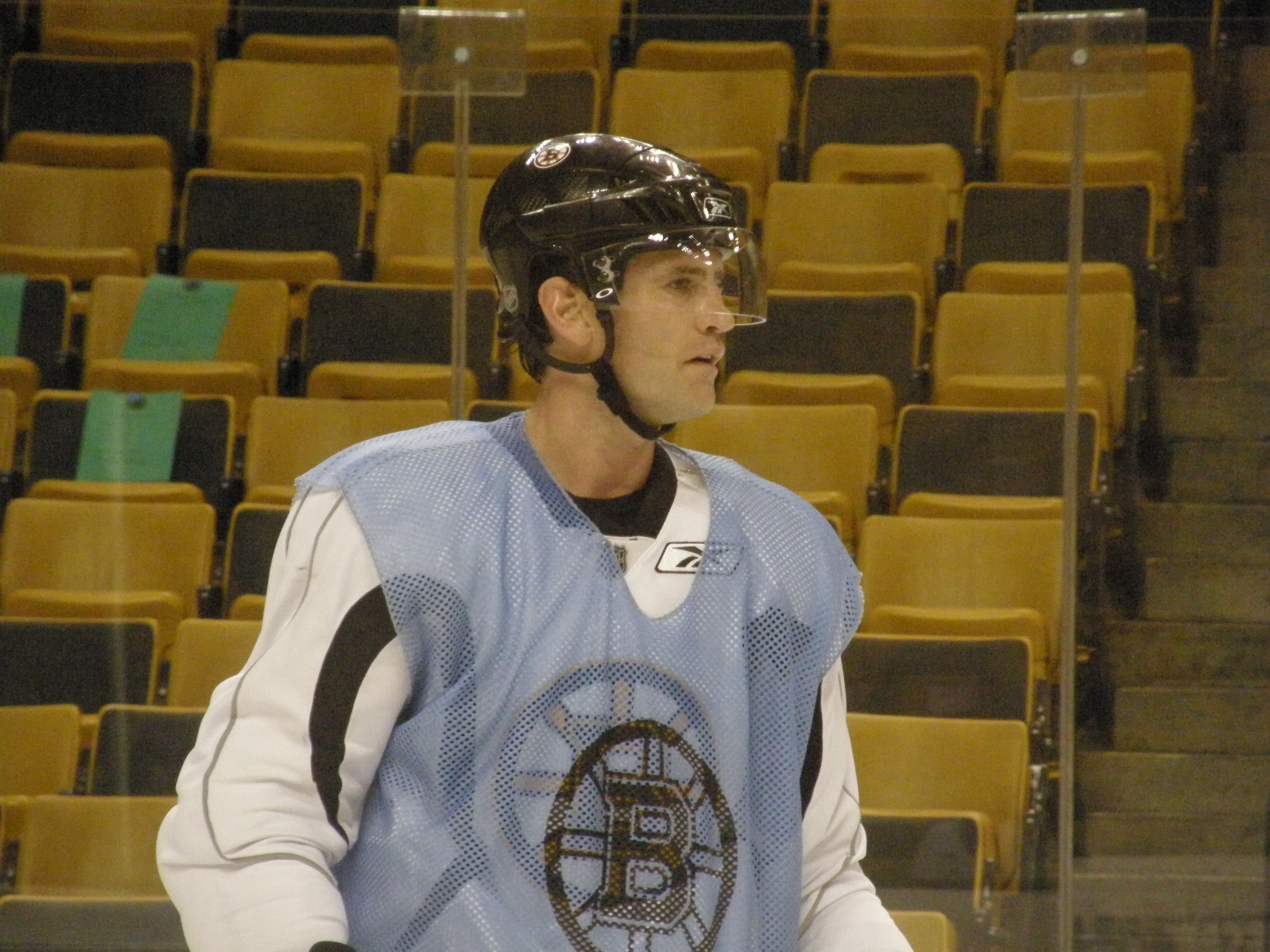
Yelle Practicing with the Boston Bruins

== Career statistics ==
			Regular season					Playoffs
Season	Team	League	GP	G	A	Pts	PIM	GP	G	A	Pts	PIM
1990–91	Cumberland Grads	CJHL	33	20	30	50	16	—	—	—	—	—
1991–92	Oshawa Generals	OHL	55	12	14	26	20	7	2	0	2	2
1992–93	Oshawa Generals	OHL	66	24	50	74	20	10	2	4	6	4
1993–94	Oshawa Generals	OHL	66	35	69	104	22	5	1	7	8	2
1994–95	Cornwall Aces	AHL	40	18	15	33	22	13	7	7	14	8
1995–96	Colorado Avalanche	NHL	71	13	14	27	30	22	1	4	5	8
1996–97	Colorado Avalanche	NHL	79	9	17	26	38	12	1	6	7	2
1997–98	Colorado Avalanche	NHL	81	7	15	22	48	7	1	0	1	12
1998–99	Colorado Avalanche	NHL	72	8	7	15	40	10	0	1	1	6
1999–2000	Colorado Avalanche	NHL	79	8	14	22	28	17	1	2	3	4
2000–01	Colorado Avalanche	NHL	50	4	10	14	20	23	1	2	3	8
2001–02	Colorado Avalanche	NHL	73	5	12	17	48	20	0	2	2	14
2002–03	Calgary Flames	NHL	82	10	15	25	50	—	—	—	—	—
2003–04	Calgary Flames	NHL	53	4	13	17	24	23	3	3	6	16
2005–06	Calgary Flames	NHL	74	4	14	18	48	7	1	0	1	8
2006–07	Calgary Flames	NHL	56	10	14	24	32	6	0	0	0	2
2007–08	Calgary Flames	NHL	74	3	9	12	20	7	2	0	2	6
2008–09	Boston Bruins	NHL	77	7	11	18	75	11	0	1	1	2
2009–10	Carolina Hurricanes	NHL	59	4	3	7	62	—	—	—	—	—
2009–10	Colorado Avalanche	NHL	11	0	1	1	4	6	0	0	0	2
NHL totals			971	96	169	265	642	171	11	21	32	90

== Awards and honours ==
Award	Year
NHL
Stanley Cup champion	1996, 2001
