= Éric Messier =

Canadian ice hockey player

- Born: October 29, 1973 (age 52) Drummondville, Quebec, Canada
- Height: 6 ft 2 in (188 cm)
- Weight: 195 lb (88 kg; 13 st 13 lb)
- Position: Defence
- Shot: Left
- Played for: Colorado Avalanche; Florida Panthers
- NHL draft: Undrafted
- Playing career: 1995–2003

Éric Messier (born October 29, 1973) is a Canadian former professional ice hockey defenceman who played eight seasons in the National Hockey League (NHL) for the Colorado Avalanche and Florida Panthers.

== Playing career ==
As a youth, Messier played in the 1985 and 1986 Quebec International Pee-Wee Hockey Tournaments with a minor ice hockey team from Drummondville.

Messier played in the Quebec Major Junior Hockey League for the Trois-Rivières Draveurs and then the Sherbrooke Faucons after the Draveurs relocated to Sherbrooke.

He signed with the Colorado Avalanche as a free agent in 1995 and was assigned to the American Hockey League's Cornwall Aces for one season before Messier and all Avalanche players assigned to the Aces were transferred to the Hershey Bears as the Aces folded. Messier won the Calder Cup in 1997 with the Bears..

Messier was called up to the main roster in that season for the first time and played 21 games. He went on to play seven seasons for the Avalanche, playing a total of 385 regular season games and 72 playoff games, ultimately winning the Stanley Cup with Colorado in 2001. In 2003, Messier was traded to the Florida Panthers with Václav Nedorost for Peter Worrell and Florida's 2nd round pick in the 2004 NHL entry draft. He suffered what proved to be a career-ending wrist injury on his first shift in a November 21, 2003 game.

== Career statistics ==
			Regular season					Playoffs
Season	Team	League	GP	G	A	Pts	PIM	GP	G	A	Pts	PIM
1991–92	Trois-Rivières Draveurs	QMJHL	58	2	10	12	28	15	2	2	4	13
1992–93	Sherbrooke Faucons	QMJHL	51	4	17	21	82	15	0	4	4	18
1993–94	Sherbrooke Faucons	QMJHL	67	4	24	28	69	12	1	7	8	14
1994–95	University of Quebec in Trois-Rivières	CIS	13	8	5	13	20	4	0	3	3	8
1995–96	Cornwall Aces	AHL	72	5	9	14	111	8	1	1	2	20
1996–97	Hershey Bears	AHL	55	16	26	42	69	9	3	8	11	14
1996–97	Colorado Avalanche	NHL	21	0	0	0	4	6	0	0	0	4
1997–98	Colorado Avalanche	NHL	62	4	12	16	20	—	—	—	—	—
1998–99	Colorado Avalanche	NHL	31	4	2	6	14	3	0	0	0	0
1998–99	Hershey Bears	AHL	6	1	3	4	4	—	—	—	—	—
1999–00	Colorado Avalanche	NHL	61	3	6	9	24	14	0	1	1	4
2000–01	Colorado Avalanche	NHL	64	5	7	12	26	23	2	2	4	14
2001–02	Colorado Avalanche	NHL	74	5	10	15	26	21	1	2	3	0
2002–03	Colorado Avalanche	NHL	72	4	10	14	16	5	0	0	0	0
2003–04	Florida Panthers	NHL	21	0	3	3	16	—	—	—	—	—
NHL totals			406	25	50	75	146	72	3	5	8	22

== Awards and honors ==
Award	Year	Ref
NHL
Stanley Cup champion	2001	
