= Dan Hinote =

American ice hockey player and coach

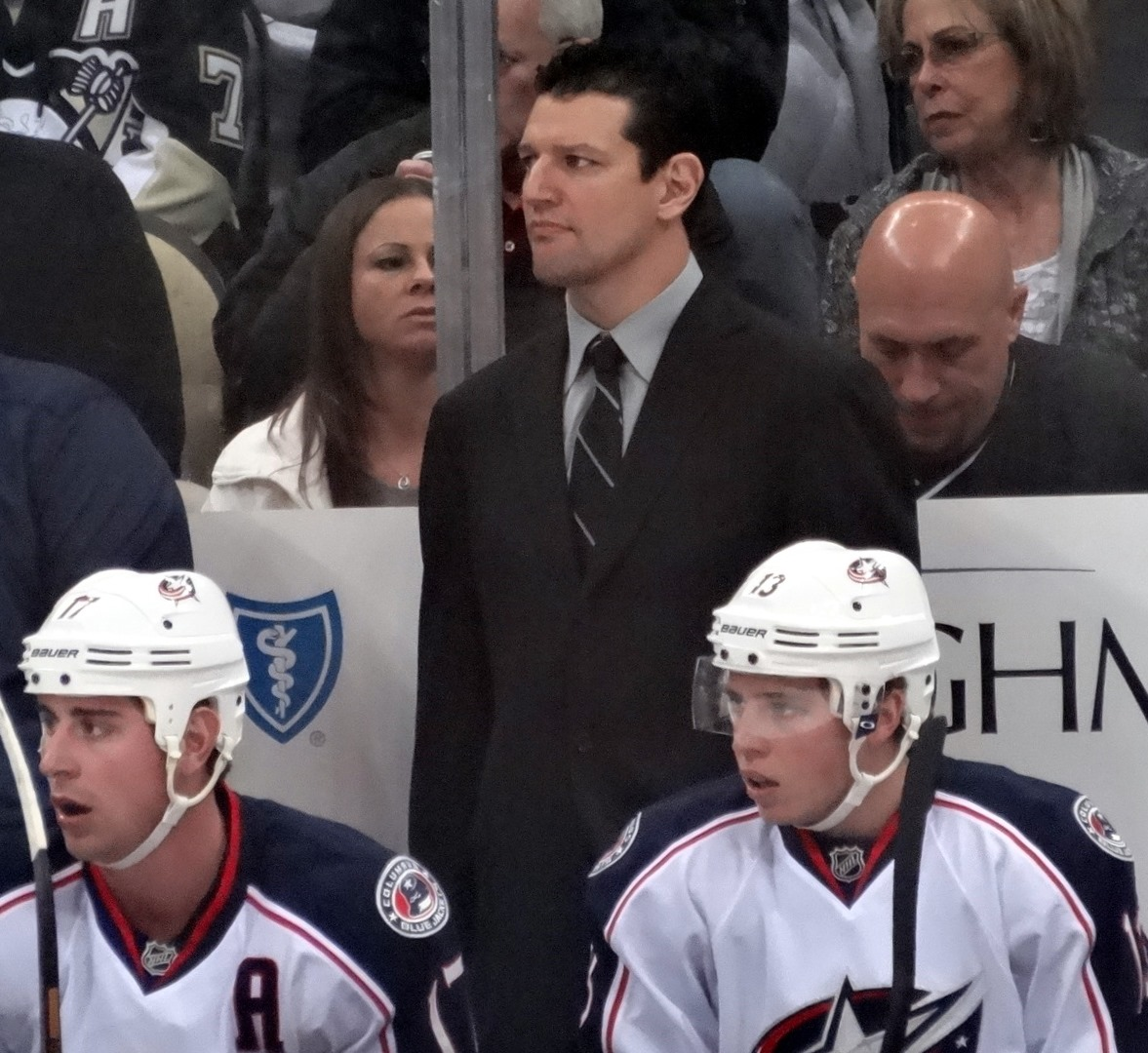
- Hinote (center) coaching the Columbus Blue Jackets in 2013
- Born: January 30, 1977 (age 49) Leesburg, Florida, U.S.
- Height: 6 ft 0 in (183 cm)
- Weight: 195 lb (88 kg; 13 st 13 lb)
- Position: Right wing
- Shot: Right
- Played for: Colorado Avalanche; Modo Hockey; St. Louis Blues
- NHL draft: 167th overall, 1996; Colorado Avalanche
- Playing career: 1998–2010

Daniel Chester Hinote (born January 30, 1977) is an American former professional ice hockey player and current assistant coach for the Tampa Bay Lightning of the National Hockey League (NHL). He finished his playing career playing for Modo Hockey of the Swedish Elitserien. Though born in Florida, he was raised in Rogers, a small town near Elk River, Minnesota, where he attended Elk River High School.

== Playing career ==
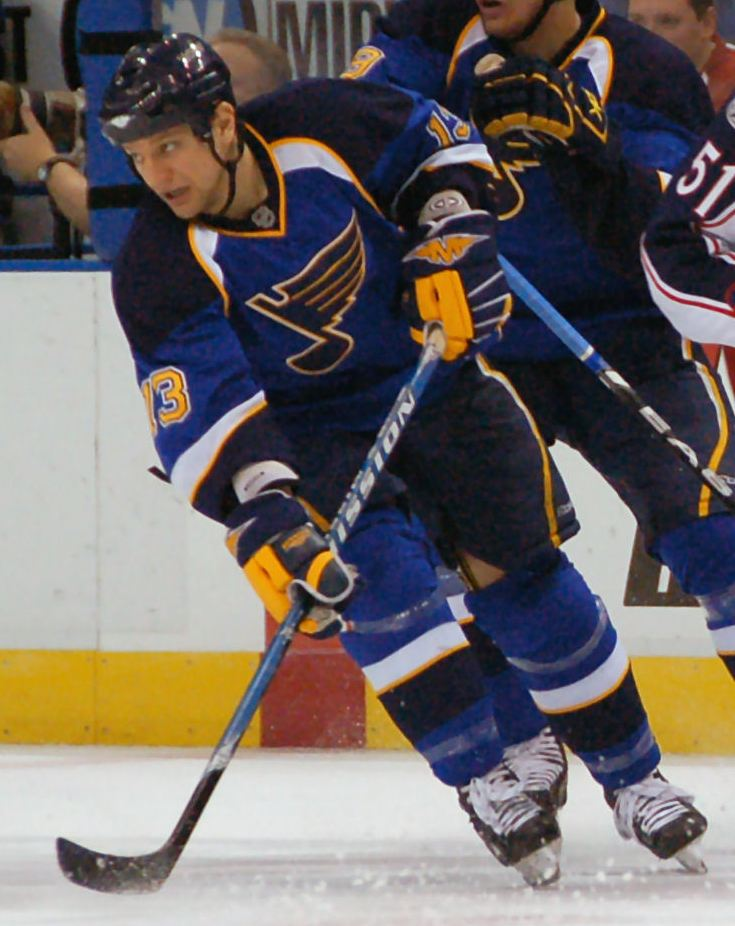
Hinote playing for the St. Louis Blues in 2008

Hinote accepted an appointment to the United States Military Academy in 1995, and initially planned on a career with the FBI. He left the Academy in 1996 when he became the first NHL player ever to be drafted from West Point when the Colorado Avalanche selected him in the 7th round (167th overall pick) of the 1996 NHL entry draft.

Hinote subsequently spent one and a half seasons playing major junior hockey for the Oshawa Generals of the OHL before turning pro with Colorado's AHL affiliate, the Hershey Bears, midway through the 1997–98 season.

Hinote cracked the Avs' roster in the 1999–2000 season out of training camp, but spent most of that season in Hershey before making the NHL roster for good the next season. Though he would only score once during that brief call-up in 1999-2000, the goal itself marked the first time a Florida-born player ever scored an NHL goal. Hinote demonstrated good offensive potential as an NCAA, OHL and AHL player. However, at the NHL level he has been known more for his defensive skills and efficient penalty killing than for scoring. Hinote was a member of the Stanley Cup champion Avalanche in 2001.

In 2004–05, Hinote joined Modo Hockey of the Swedish Elitserien during the NHL lockout.

On July 3, 2006, Hinote signed a multi-year contract with the St. Louis Blues as an unrestricted free agent. A shoulder injury limited Hinote to only 41 games in his first season with the Blues. A recurring hip injury caused him to miss 24 games during the 2007–08 season.

On September 4, 2009, it was announced that Hinote would participate in the San Jose Sharks training camp for the 2009–10 season. He did not make the roster and was released by the Sharks on September 27, 2009. On November 18, 2009, Hinote signed a one-year contract with MoDo Hockey in the Swedish Elitserien, the club he played for during the 2004–05 NHL lockout.

== Coaching career ==
After completing the 2009–10 season with Modo, Hinote retired as a professional hockey player, and took a job as an assistant coach for the Columbus Blue Jackets on July 1, 2010.

On June 4, 2014, Hinote announced he would not sign a contract extension as an assistant along with the rest of Todd Richards' coaching staff and was succeeded by Brad Larsen. Hinote said he would move to Chicago due to family matters.

Hinote worked part time with the Blue Jackets as a scout, while also working full time as a stock broker with Wedbush Securities. He is an active volunteer with the NHL Alumni Association, leading a program called BreakAway which helps former players deal with the challenges of life off the ice. He lives in Novi, Michigan, a suburb of Detroit. In September 2020 he was hired as an assistant coach by the Nashville Predators after two seasons as an associate coach with USA Hockey's National Team Development Program.

He remained as an assistant coach on the Predators staff for four seasons before leaving at the conclusion of the 2023–24 season. On July 18, 2024, Hinote returned to his original NHL organization in the Colorado Avalanche, hired as an associate head coach for AHL affiliate, the Colorado Eagles. He finished the season with the Eagles and moved on to another NHL position, accepting an assistant coaching position with the Tampa Bay Lightning on June 6, 2025.

== Career statistics ==
=== Regular season and playoffs ===
			Regular season					Playoffs
Season	Team	League	GP	G	A	Pts	PIM	GP	G	A	Pts	PIM
1993–94	Elk River High School	HS-MN	—	—	—	—	—	—	—	—	—	—
1994–95	Army	NCAA	33	20	24	44	20	—	—	—	—	—
1995–96	Army	NCAA	34	21	24	45	22	—	—	—	—	—
1996–97	Oshawa Generals	OHL	60	15	13	28	58	18	4	5	9	8
1997–98	Oshawa Generals	OHL	35	12	15	27	39	5	2	2	4	7
1997–98	Hershey Bears	AHL	24	1	4	5	25	—	—	—	—	—
1998–99	Hershey Bears	AHL	65	4	16	20	95	5	3	1	4	6
1999–00	Colorado Avalanche	NHL	27	1	3	4	10	—	—	—	—	—
1999–00	Hershey Bears	AHL	55	28	31	59	96	14	4	5	9	19
2000–01	Colorado Avalanche	NHL	76	5	10	15	51	23	2	4	6	21
2001–02	Colorado Avalanche	NHL	58	6	6	12	39	19	1	2	3	9
2002–03	Colorado Avalanche	NHL	60	6	4	10	49	7	1	2	3	2
2003–04	Colorado Avalanche	NHL	59	4	7	11	57	11	1	0	1	0
2004–05	Modo Hockey	SEL	18	2	1	3	106	5	0	0	0	56
2005–06	Colorado Avalanche	NHL	73	5	8	13	48	9	1	1	2	31
2006–07	St. Louis Blues	NHL	41	5	5	10	23	—	—	—	—	—
2007–08	St. Louis Blues	NHL	58	5	5	10	42	—	—	—	—	—
2008–09	St. Louis Blues	NHL	51	1	4	5	64	3	0	0	0	4
2009–10	Modo Hockey	SEL	26	4	4	8	28	—	—	—	—	—
NHL totals			503	38	52	90	383	72	6	9	15	67

== Awards and honors ==
Award	Year
NHL
Stanley Cup champion	2001
