= Martin Škoula =

Czech ice hockey player

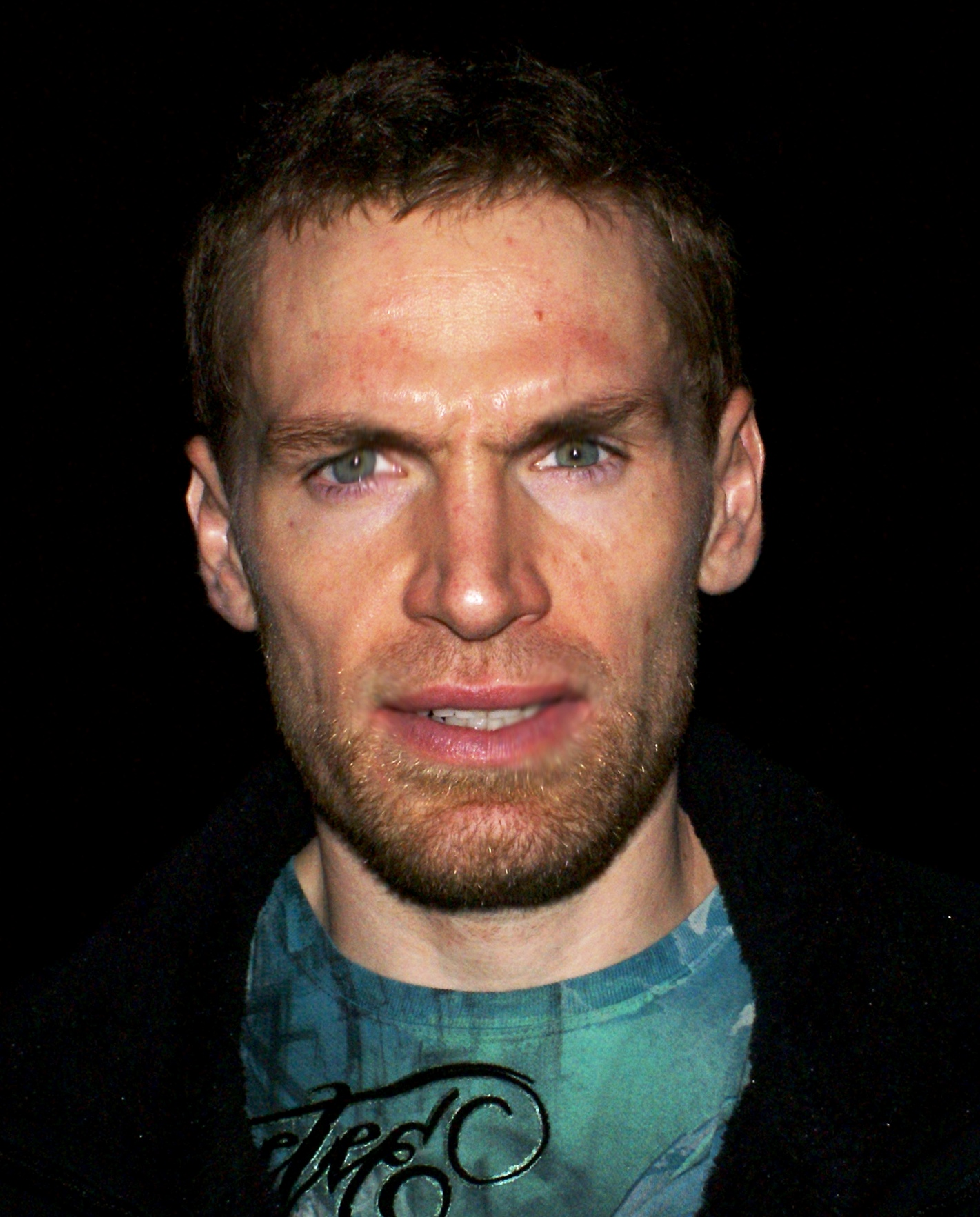
- Born: October 28, 1979 (age 46) Litoměřice, Czechoslovakia
- Height: 6 ft 3 in (191 cm)
- Weight: 226 lb (103 kg; 16 st 2 lb)
- Position: Defence
- Shot: Left
- Played for: HC Litvínov; Colorado Avalanche; Mighty Ducks of Anaheim; Dallas Stars; Minnesota Wild; Pittsburgh Penguins; New Jersey Devils; Avangard Omsk; Lev Praha; Slovan Bratislava; HC Bílí Tygři Liberec
- National team: Czech Republic
- NHL draft: 17th overall, 1998; Colorado Avalanche
- Playing career: 1999–2015

Martin Škoula (born October 28, 1979) is a Czech former professional ice hockey defenceman, who enjoyed a lengthy career in the National Hockey League (NHL) with the Colorado Avalanche, Mighty Ducks of Anaheim, Dallas Stars, Minnesota Wild, Pittsburgh Penguins and the New Jersey Devils. He won the Stanley Cup with the Colorado Avalanche in 2001.

== Playing career ==
Škoula was selected in the first round of the 1998 NHL entry draft, 17th overall, by the Colorado Avalanche. After playing two seasons in the Czech Republic, Škoula came over to North America in 1997, playing for the Barrie Colts of the OHL. His size and offensive ability made him an instant success. After only one game in the American Hockey League, with the Hershey Bears, Škoula joined the Avalanche.

In 2001, Škoula was a part of the Avalanche team that won the Stanley Cup. The following season, he played for his native country at the Salt Lake City Winter Olympics.

On February 21, 2004, Škoula was dealt by the Avalanche to the Mighty Ducks of Anaheim for Kurt Sauer and a 4th-round pick (Raymond Macias). After playing 20 games with the Ducks, Škoula left as an unrestricted free agent. He spent the 2004 NHL Lockout in the Czech Extraliga with HC Litvínov.

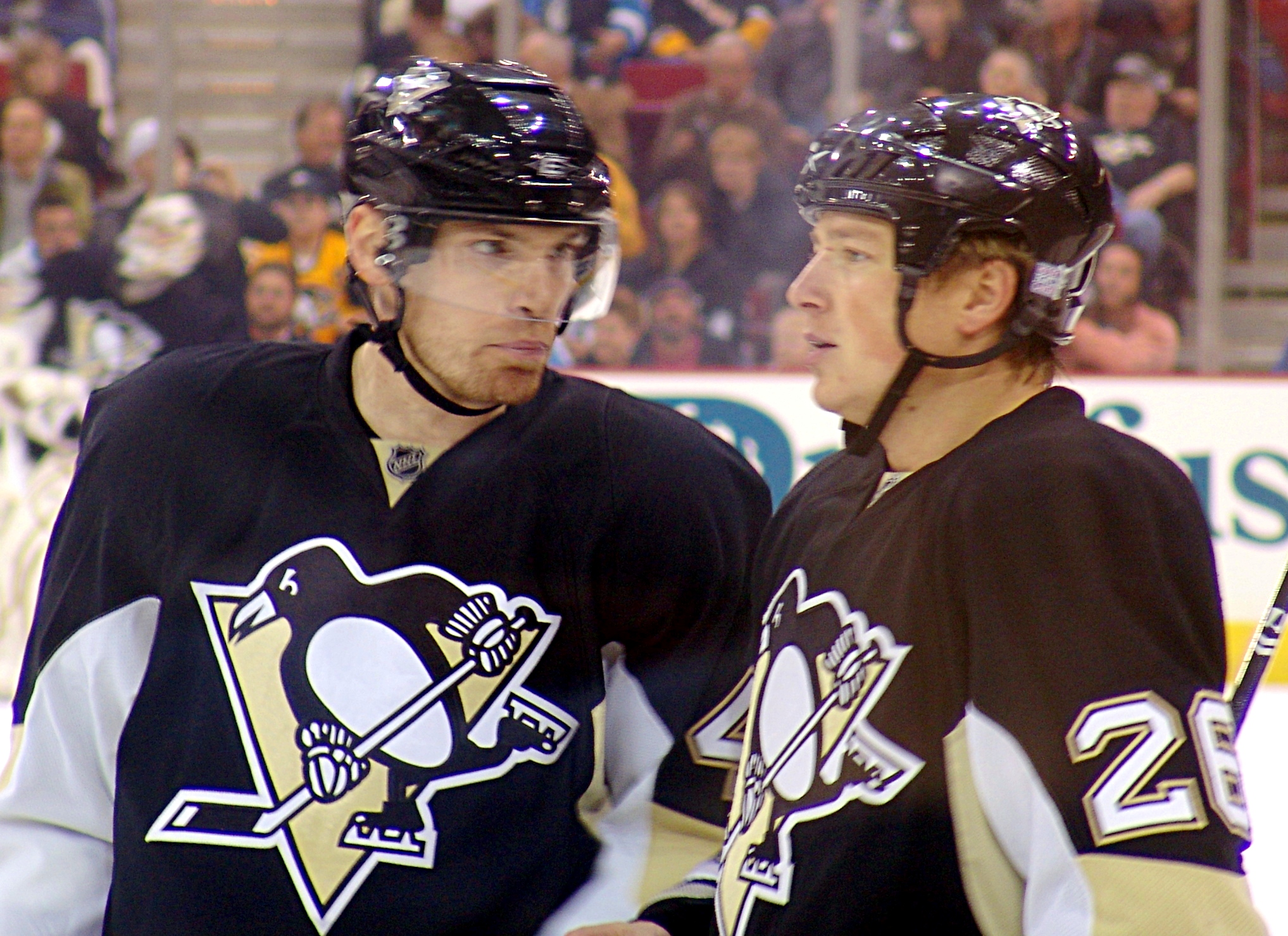
Martin Škoula (left) with the Penguins in October 2009.

On August 3, 2005, prior to the 2005–06 season, Škoula was signed by the Dallas Stars to a two-year contract. He stayed less than a season before he was dealt at the trade deadline by the Stars, along with Shawn Belle, to the Minnesota Wild for Willie Mitchell and a second-round pick.

On September 29, 2009, Škoula signed a one-year contract with the Pittsburgh Penguins for the 2009-10 season. Škoula played in 33 games with the Penguins as a reserve defenceman before he was included in a trade with prospect Luca Caputi to the Toronto Maple Leafs for Alexei Ponikarovsky on March 3, 2010. The same day, Škoula was then traded to the New Jersey Devils for a fifth-round pick in 2010.

On June 23, 2010, after 11 years in the NHL, Škoula returned to Europe signing a one-year contract with Russian team Avangard Omsk of the KHL. After one season in the KHL, Martin signed a new two-year contract with Avangard.

In the second year of his extension, after nine games in the 2012–13 season, Skoula was released by Omsk and was transferred to newcomer KHL Czech based, HC Lev Praha on September 27, 2012. After 21 games with Lev Praha for 7 points, Skoula was placed on the unprotected list and went unclaimed. He was then reassigned to join hometown club, HC Stadion Litoměřice, of the 1. národní hokejová liga on December 26, 2012.

On April 21, 2013, Skoula signed as a free agent to return to the KHL with HC Slovan Bratislava on a one-year contract. In the 2013–14 season, Skoula was one of only four Bratislava players to appear in every game with 54, helping contribute from the blueline with 13 points. He was unable to help elevate Slovan to the playoffs.

After signalling an intention to move closer to his native Litomerice at season's end, he returned to the Czech Extraliga signing a one-year contract with HC Bílí Tygři Liberec on May 27, 2014. Skoula featured in 10 games in Liberec, posting 2 goals and 7 points before ending his professional career.

== Career statistics ==
=== Regular season and playoffs ===
			Regular season					Playoffs
Season	Team	League	GP	G	A	Pts	PIM	GP	G	A	Pts	PIM
1995–96	HC Litvínov, s.r.o.	CZE U18	2	0	0	0	—	—	—	—	—	—
1995–96	HC Litvínov, s.r.o.	CZE U20	38	0	4	4	—	—	—	—	—	—
1995–96	HC Litvínov, s.r.o.	ELH	—	—	—	—	—	1	0	0	0	0
1996–97	HC Litvínov, s.r.o.	CZE U20	38	2	9	11	—	—	—	—	—	—
1996–97	HC Chemopetrol, a.s.	ELH	1	0	0	0	0	—	—	—	—	—
1997–98	Barrie Colts	OHL	66	8	36	44	36	6	1	3	4	4
1998–99	Barrie Colts	OHL	67	13	46	59	46	12	3	10	13	13
1998–99	Hershey Bears	AHL	—	—	—	—	—	1	0	0	0	0
1999–2000	Colorado Avalanche	NHL	80	3	13	16	20	17	0	2	2	4
2000–01	Colorado Avalanche	NHL	82	8	17	25	38	23	1	4	5	8
2001–02	Colorado Avalanche	NHL	82	10	21	31	42	21	0	6	6	2
2002–03	Colorado Avalanche	NHL	81	4	21	25	68	7	0	1	1	4
2003–04	Colorado Avalanche	NHL	58	2	14	16	30	—	—	—	—	—
2003–04	Mighty Ducks of Anaheim	NHL	21	2	7	9	2	—	—	—	—	—
2004–05	HC Chemopetrol, a.s.	ELH	47	4	15	19	101	6	0	0	0	6
2005–06	Dallas Stars	NHL	61	4	11	15	36	—	—	—	—	—
2005–06	Minnesota Wild	NHL	17	1	5	6	10	—	—	—	—	—
2006–07	Minnesota Wild	NHL	81	0	15	15	36	5	0	0	0	4
2007–08	Minnesota Wild	NHL	80	3	8	11	26	6	0	0	0	0
2008–09	Minnesota Wild	NHL	81	4	12	16	10	—	—	—	—	—
2009–10	Pittsburgh Penguins	NHL	33	3	5	8	6	—	—	—	—	—
2009–10	New Jersey Devils	NHL	19	0	3	3	4	4	0	0	0	0
2010–11	Avangard Omsk	KHL	52	3	19	22	21	14	0	3	3	4
2011–12	Avangard Omsk	KHL	52	2	13	15	16	21	2	8	10	4
2012–13	Avangard Omsk	KHL	9	0	1	1	0	—	—	—	—	—
2012–13	Lev Praha	KHL	21	1	6	7	8	—	—	—	—	—
2012–13	HC Stadion Litoměřice	CZE II	1	0	0	0	2	—	—	—	—	—
2013–14	Slovan Bratislava	KHL	54	2	11	13	18	—	—	—	—	—
2014–15	Bílí Tygři Liberec	ELH	10	2	5	7	4	—	—	—	—	—
NHL totals			776	44	152	196	328	83	1	13	14	22
KHL totals			188	8	50	58	63	35	2	11	13	8

=== International ===
Medal record

Representing Czech Republic

Ice hockey

World Championships
Silver medal – second place	2006 Riga	
Bronze medal – third place	2011 Bratislava	

Year	Team	Event	Result	GP	G	A	Pts	PIM
1997	Czech Republic	EJC	5th	6	0	2	2	4
2002	Czech Republic	OG	7th	4	0	0	0	0
2004	Czech Republic	WC	5th	7	1	0	1	4
2004	Czech Republic	WCH	3rd	2	0	0	0	2
2006	Czech Republic	WC	2nd place, silver medalist(s)	9	0	2	2	6
2011	Czech Republic	WC	3rd place, bronze medalist(s)	9	0	2	2	0
Senior totals				31	1	4	5	12

== Awards and honours ==
Award	Year
OHL
Second All-Star Team	1999
Plus/Minus Award	1999
CHL All-Rookie Team	1999
NHL
Stanley Cup champion	2001
KHL
All-Star Game	2011

== Transactions ==
- June 27, 1998 - Škoula drafted by Colorado Avalanche
- February 21, 2004 - Škoula traded by Colorado to Anaheim Ducks in exchange for Kurt Sauer and a 4th-round draft pick (Raymond Macias)
- August 3, 2005 - Škoula signs with Dallas Stars.
- March 9, 2006 - Škoula traded by Dallas along with Shawn Belle to the Minnesota Wild for Willie Mitchell and the Wild's second-round pick in the 2007 NHL entry draft.
- September 29, 2009 - Škoula signs a one-year deal with the Pittsburgh Penguins.
- March 3, 2010 - Škoula was traded by Pittsburgh to the Toronto Maple Leafs, along with teammate prospect Luca Caputi, for Alexei Ponikarovsky
- March 3, 2010 - Škoula was traded from the Toronto Maple Leafs to the New Jersey Devils for a fifth-round pick in the 2010 NHL entry draft.

Awards and achievements
Preceded by Alex Tanguay	Colorado Avalanche first-round draft pick 1998	Succeeded by Robyn Regehr
