= Jeff Shantz =

Canadian ice hockey player (born 1973)

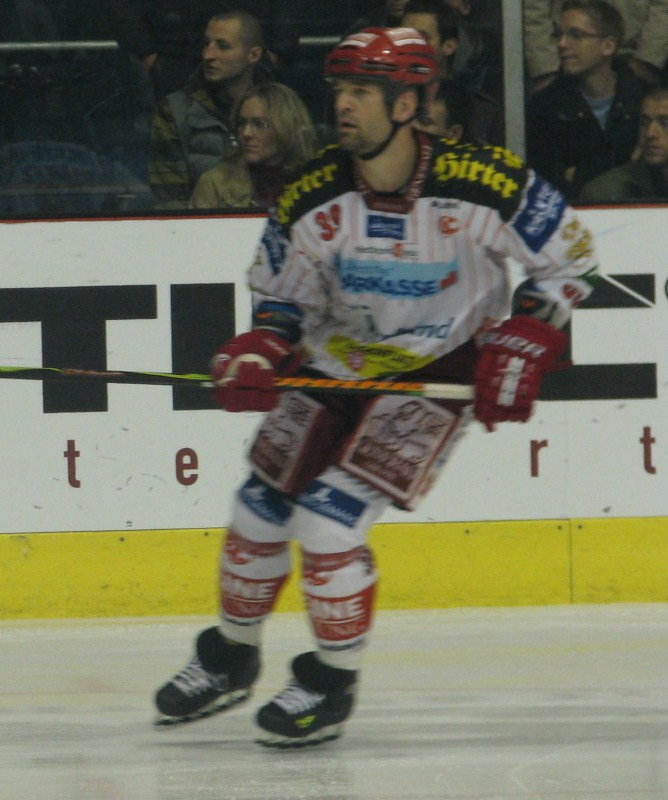
- Born: October 10, 1973 (age 53) Duchess, Alberta, Canada
- Height: 6 ft 0 in (183 cm)
- Weight: 184 lb (83 kg; 13 st 2 lb)
- Position: Centre
- Shot: Right
- Played for: Chicago Blackhawks; Calgary Flames; Colorado Avalanche; SCL Tigers; Adler Mannheim; EC KAC
- NHL draft: 36th overall, 1992; Chicago Blackhawks
- Playing career: 1993–2011

Jeffrey Dale Shantz (born October 10, 1973) is a Canadian former professional ice hockey centre. He played predominantly in the National Hockey League (NHL) with the Chicago Blackhawks, Calgary Flames and the Colorado Avalanche.

== Playing career ==
Shantz was drafted by the Chicago Blackhawks in the second round, 36th overall in the 1992 NHL entry draft. On October 1, 2002, prior to the 2002–03 season, Shantz was traded by the Flames, along with Derek Morris and Dean McAmmond, to the Colorado Avalanche for Chris Drury and Stephane Yelle. He played 642 regular season games in the NHL with the Chicago Blackhawks, Calgary Flames and Colorado Avalanche scoring 72 goals and 139 assists for 211 points with 341 penalty minutes. He also played in 44 NHL playoff games, scoring 5 goals and 8 assists for 13 points with 24 penalty minutes.

After a single season with the Avalanche his NHL career finished in 2003, and he left for Europe playing two seasons for Langnau in the Swiss NLA and three seasons for Adler Mannheim of the DEL in Germany. Shantz then joined EBEL team EC KAC on a one-year contract for the 2008–09 season. In 53 games with Klagenfurt, Jeff finished fourth on the team with 17 goals and 48 points to help KAC win the Austrian Championship and as a result signed a one-year contract extension on April 23, 2009. Shantz and KAC parted at the conclusion of the 2011 season. After Shantz had formally announced retirement as a player it was expected that he would join the coaching ranks of KAC. The team however decided to not take Shantz up on his offer and he returned to Canada to pursue a career in the energy sector.

== Personal ==
Shantz's maternal uncle is Joseph B. Martin, former Dean of Harvard Medical School.

== Career statistics ==
=== Regular season and playoffs ===
			Regular season					Playoffs
Season	Team	League	GP	G	A	Pts	PIM	GP	G	A	Pts	PIM
1989–90	Regina Pats	WHL	1	0	0	0	0	—	—	—	—	—
1990–91	Regina Pats	WHL	69	16	21	37	22	8	2	2	4	2
1991–92	Regina Pats	WHL	72	39	50	89	75	—	—	—	—	—
1992–93	Regina Pats	WHL	64	29	54	83	75	13	2	12	14	14
1993–94	Indianapolis Ice	IHL	19	5	9	14	20	—	—	—	—	—
1993–94	Chicago Blackhawks	NHL	52	3	13	16	30	6	0	0	0	6
1994–95	Indianapolis Ice	IHL	32	9	15	24	20	—	—	—	—	—
1994–95	Chicago Blackhawks	NHL	45	6	12	18	33	16	3	1	4	2
1995–96	Chicago Blackhawks	NHL	78	6	14	20	24	10	2	3	5	6
1996–97	Chicago Blackhawks	NHL	69	9	21	30	28	6	0	4	4	6
1997–98	Chicago Blackhawks	NHL	61	11	20	31	36	—	—	—	—	—
1998–99	Chicago Blackhawks	NHL	7	1	0	1	4	—	—	—	—	—
1998–99	Calgary Flames	NHL	69	12	17	29	40	—	—	—	—	—
1999–00	Calgary Flames	NHL	74	13	18	31	30	—	—	—	—	—
2000–01	Calgary Flames	NHL	73	5	15	20	58	—	—	—	—	—
2001–02	Saint John Flames	AHL	2	0	1	1	0	—	—	—	—	—
2001–02	Calgary Flames	NHL	40	3	3	6	23	—	—	—	—	—
2002–03	Colorado Avalanche	NHL	74	3	6	9	35	6	0	0	0	4
2003–04	SCL Tigers	NLA	48	18	27	45	40	—	—	—	—	—
2003–04	EHC Biel	NLB	—	—	—	—	—	4	1	0	1	4
2004–05	SCL Tigers	NLA	43	9	19	28	98	—	—	—	—	—
2005–06	Adler Mannheim	DEL	52	18	20	38	72	—	—	—	—	—
2006–07	Adler Mannheim	DEL	36	7	19	26	64	11	7	0	7	14
2007–08	Adler Mannheim	DEL	45	8	18	26	64	5	0	1	1	4
2008–09	EC KAC	EBEL	53	17	31	48	78	13	2	2	4	8
2009–10	EC KAC	EBEL	41	6	26	32	78	7	2	2	4	8
2010–11	EC KAC	EBEL	50	16	19	35	100	5	2	4	6	6
NHL totals			642	72	139	211	341	44	5	8	13	24

Medal record

Representing Canada

Ice hockey

World Junior Championships
Gold medal – first place	1993 Gävle	

=== International ===
Year	Team	Event	Result	GP	G	A	Pts	PIM
1993	Canada	WJC	1st place, gold medalist(s)	7	2	4	6	2
Junior totals				7	2	4	6	2

== Awards ==
- WHL East First All-Star Team – 1993
