= Bryan Muir =

Canadian ice hockey player (born 1973)

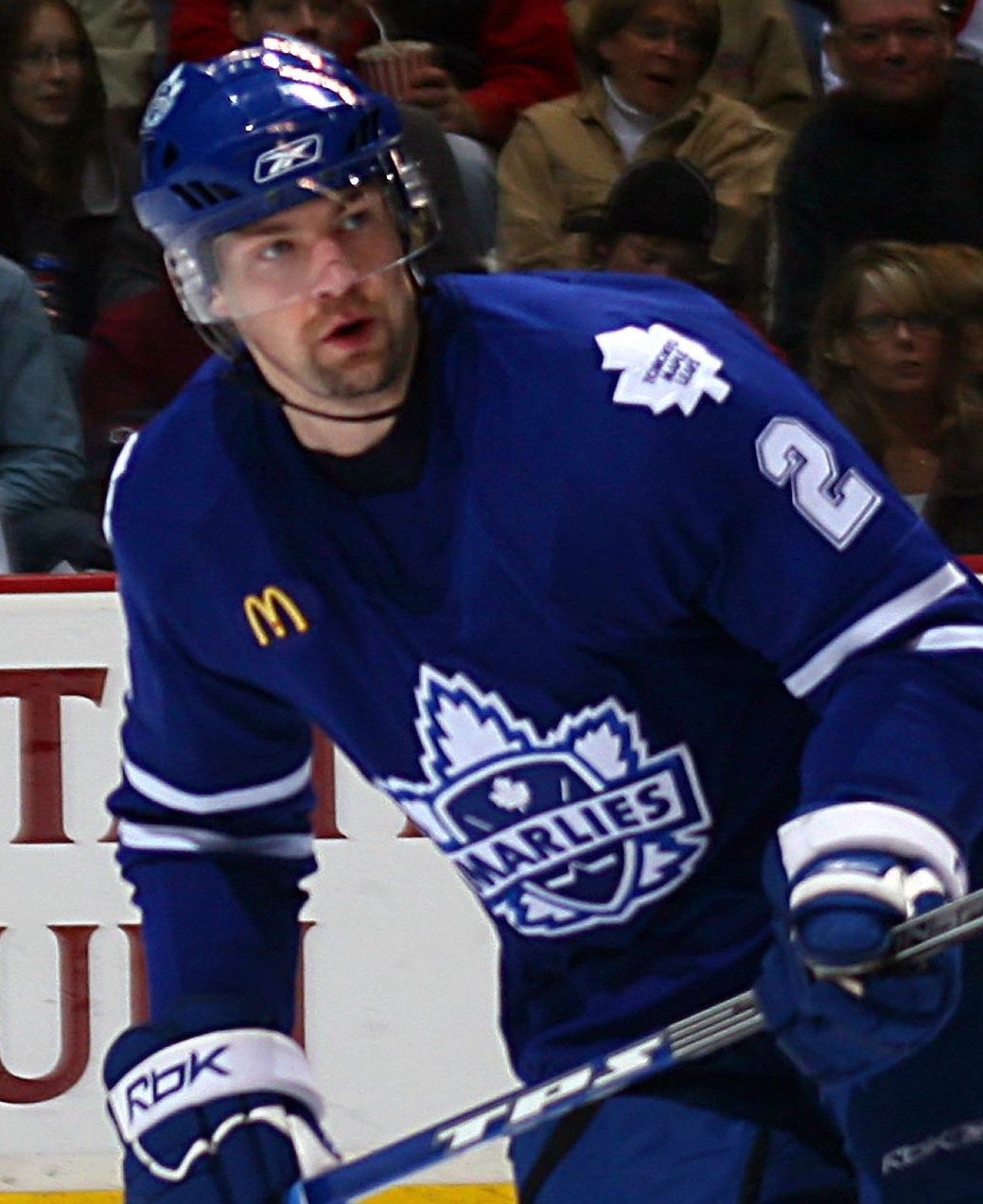
- Muir with the Toronto Marlies in 2007
- Born: June 8, 1973 (age 53) Winnipeg, Manitoba, Canada
- Height: 6 ft 4 in (193 cm)
- Weight: 220 lb (100 kg; 15 st 10 lb)
- Position: Defence
- Shot: Left
- Played for: Edmonton Oilers; New Jersey Devils; Chicago Blackhawks; Tampa Bay Lightning; Colorado Avalanche; Los Angeles Kings; Washington Capitals
- NHL draft: Undrafted
- Playing career: 1996–2009

Bryan D. Muir (born June 8, 1973) is a Canadian former professional ice hockey defenceman who played 279 games in the National Hockey League, winning a Stanley Cup Championship with the Colorado Avalanche in 2001. He last played with the Frankfurt Lions in the Deutsche Eishockey Liga during the 2008–09 season.

== Playing career ==
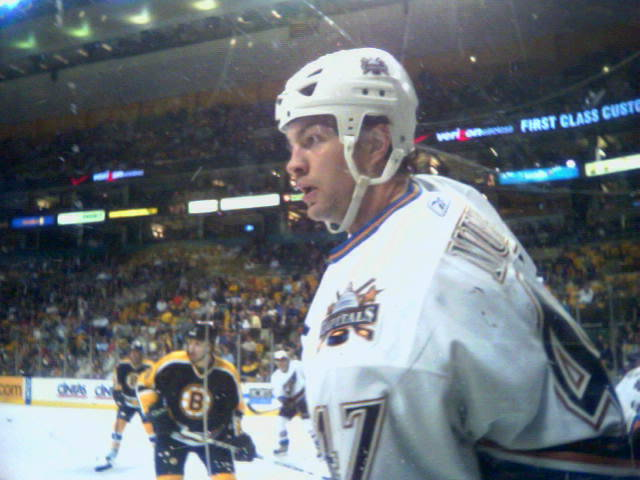
Muir with the Washington Capitals in 2006

Muir went undrafted through his junior career with the University of New Hampshire and signed his first pro contract with the Edmonton Oilers. Muir is considered a journeyman defenceman having also played stints for the New Jersey Devils, Chicago Blackhawks, Tampa Bay Lightning, Colorado Avalanche, Los Angeles Kings and the Washington Capitals.

His most distinguished year came in the 2005–06 season for the Capitals where he played 72 games for 8 goals, 18 assists and 26 points.

On August 5, 2008, Muir signed with Belarusian club HC Dinamo Minsk to participate in the newly formed KHL. Minsk released him after 23 games in the KHL, and in early January 2008 he signed with German club Frankfurt Lions for the remainder of the DEL season; after the Lions' quick exit from the 2009 DEL playoffs the club declined to offer Muir a contract extension.

Muir joined senior MLH team the Brantford Blast in 2011.

== Career statistics ==
			Regular season					Playoffs
Season	Team	League	GP	G	A	Pts	PIM	GP	G	A	Pts	PIM
1992–93	U. of New Hampshire	HE	26	1	2	3	24	—	—	—	—	—
1993–94	U. of New Hampshire	HE	40	0	4	4	48	—	—	—	—	—
1994–95	U. of New Hampshire	HE	28	9	9	18	46	—	—	—	—	—
1995–96	Canada Nat Team	Intl	42	6	12	18	38	—	—	—	—	—
1995–96	Edmonton Oilers	NHL	5	0	0	0	6	—	—	—	—	—
1996–97	Hamilton Bulldogs	AHL	75	8	16	24	80	14	0	5	5	12
1996–97	Edmonton Oilers	NHL	—	—	—	—	—	5	0	0	0	4
1997–98	Hamilton Bulldogs	AHL	28	3	10	13	62	—	—	—	—	—
1997–98	Edmonton Oilers	NHL	7	0	0	0	14	—	—	—	—	—
1997–98	Albany River Rats	AHL	41	3	10	13	67	13	3	0	3	12
1998–99	Albany River Rats	AHL	10	0	0	0	29	—	—	—	—	—
1998–99	New Jersey Devils	NHL	1	0	0	0	0	—	—	—	—	—
1998–99	Portland Pirates	AHL	2	1	1	2	2	—	—	—	—	—
1998–99	Chicago Blackhawks	NHL	53	1	4	5	50	—	—	—	—	—
1999–00	Chicago Blackhawks	NHL	11	2	3	5	13	—	—	—	—	—
1999–00	Tampa Bay Lightning	NHL	30	1	1	2	32	—	—	—	—	—
2000–01	Detroit Vipers	IHL	21	5	7	12	36	—	—	—	—	—
2000–01	Tampa Bay Lightning	NHL	10	0	3	3	15	—	—	—	—	—
2000–01	Hershey Bears	AHL	26	5	8	13	50	—	—	—	—	—
2000–01	Colorado Avalanche	NHL	8	0	0	0	4	3	0	0	0	0
2001–02	Hershey Bears	AHL	59	10	16	26	133	—	—	—	—	—
2001–02	Colorado Avalanche	NHL	22	1	1	2	9	21	0	0	0	2
2002–03	Hershey Bears	AHL	36	9	12	21	75	5	2	6	8	6
2002–03	Colorado Avalanche	NHL	32	0	2	2	19	—	—	—	—	—
2003–04	Los Angeles Kings	NHL	2	0	1	1	2	—	—	—	—	—
2003–04	Manchester Monarchs	AHL	73	13	37	50	141	6	2	3	5	12
2004–05	Modo	SEL	26	1	5	6	36	—	—	—	—	—
2004–05	Blues	SM-l	11	1	0	1	30	—	—	—	—	—
2005–06	Washington Capitals	NHL	72	8	18	26	72	—	—	—	—	—
2006–07	Washington Capitals	NHL	26	3	4	7	42	—	—	—	—	—
2007–08	Toronto Marlies	AHL	50	4	14	18	54	18	0	2	2	37
2008–09	Dynamo Minsk	KHL	23	1	6	7	47	—	—	—	—	—
2008–09	Frankfurt Lions	DEL	14	0	4	4	42	5	0	0	0	4
NHL totals			279	16	37	53	289	29	0	0	0	6

== Awards and honours ==
Award	Year	Ref
AHL
First All-Star Team	2004	
NHL
Stanley Cup champion	2001	
