= Milan Hejduk =

Czech ice hockey player

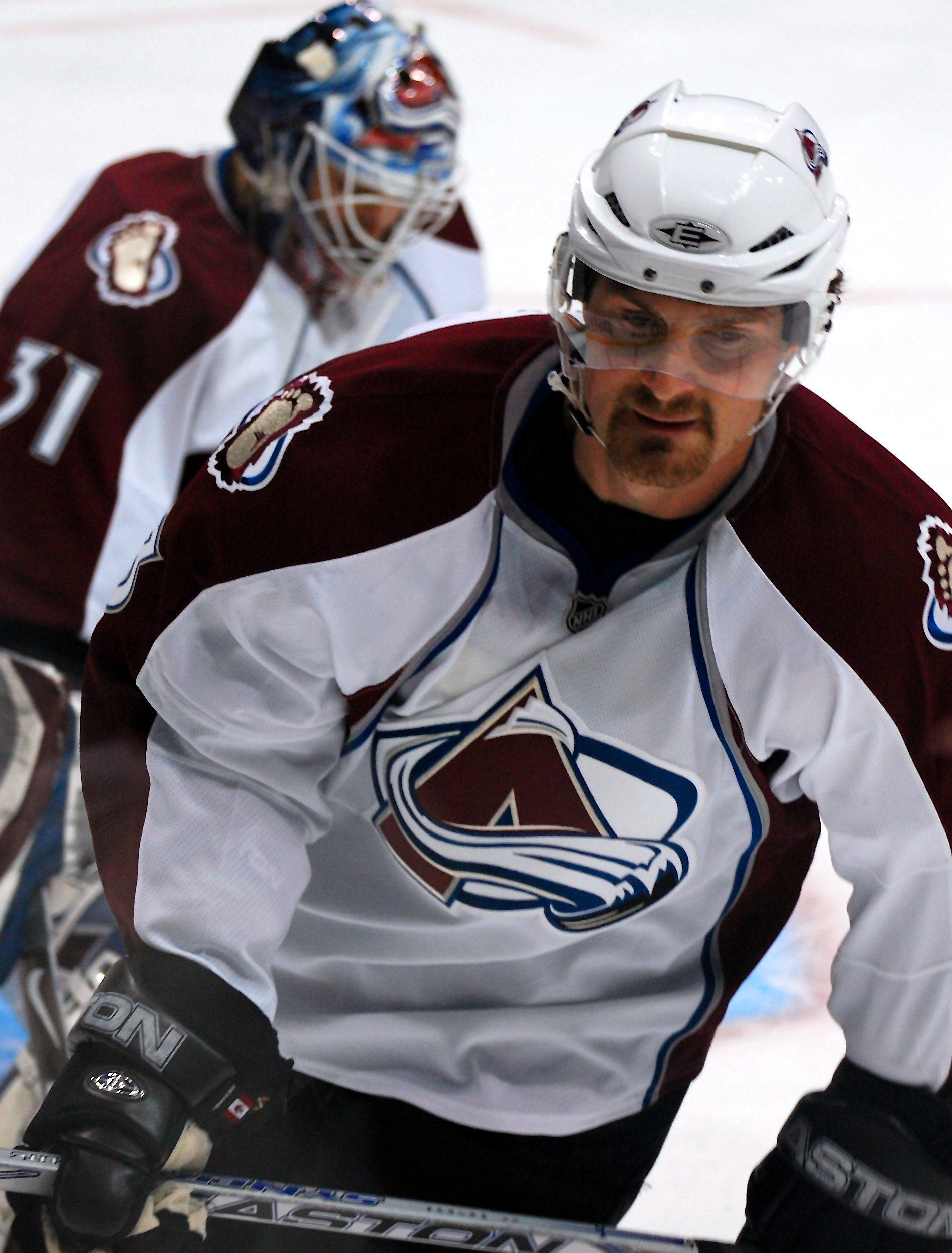
- Hejduk with the Colorado Avalanche in March 2008
- Born: February 14, 1976 (age 50) Ústí nad Labem, Czechoslovakia
- Height: 6 ft 0 in (183 cm)
- Weight: 190 lb (86 kg; 13 st 8 lb)
- Position: Right wing
- Shot: Right
- Played for: HC Pardubice; Colorado Avalanche
- National team: Czech Republic
- NHL draft: 87th overall, 1994; Quebec Nordiques
- Playing career: 1993–2013

Milan Hejduk (Czech pronunciation: [ˈmɪlan ˈɦɛjduk]; born February 14, 1976) is a Czech American former professional ice hockey forward. Nicknamed "the Duke", he spent his entire 14-year National Hockey League (NHL) career with the Colorado Avalanche and retired holding the record for most career games as an Avalanche player with 1,020. In 2003, he won the Maurice "Rocket" Richard Trophy as the NHL's leading goal scorer. He is a member of Czech Ice Hockey Hall of Fame.

== Playing career ==
The 6-foot-tall, 190-pound Hejduk was drafted 87th overall by the Quebec Nordiques in the fourth round of the 1994 NHL entry draft, after a year with HC Pardubice in the Czech Extraliga, after winning Czech Rookie of the Year with 11 goals in 32 games. He stayed with Pardubice until 1998, scoring 14, 13, 27 and 26 goals in his next four seasons respectively before transferring to the NHL after the 1997–98 season.

Hejduk won the Maurice "Rocket" Richard Trophy as the NHL's top goalscorer when he scored 50 goals for the Avalanche in the 2002–03 season, narrowly surpassing Markus Näslund of the Vancouver Canucks, who had been leading for most of the season. Hejduk scored a goal against the Calgary Flames in a 3–0 win for the Avalanche on March 12, 2006, tying him with Peter Forsberg in sixth place on the all-time Avalanche franchise goalscoring list with 216 goals. He won the Stanley Cup in the 2000–01 season with the Avalanche.

During the 2004–05 NHL lockout, Hejduk returned to HC Pardubice, scoring 25 goals in 48 Czech Extraliga games. He won the Extraliga title with Pardubice.

In the 2008–09 season, Hejduk scored his 300th career NHL goal alongside Ryan Smyth on January 18, 2009, against the Calgary Flames in a 6–2 victory at the Pepsi Center. He dressed for all 82 games that year for the Avalanche and ended what was, at that point, their most unsuccessful season in history tied with Smyth as the Avs' top scorer with 59 points. Milan also led the Avalanche for the fifth time in his career with 27 goals.

Prior to the 2009–10 season, on September 24, 2009, Hejduk signed a new one-year contract with Colorado effective for the 2010–11 season. Alongside long-time teammate and team captain Adam Foote, Hejduk provided veteran leadership to a re-invigorated, youth-laden Avalanche side to start the year. After initially persisting with a knee and back injuries through the first half of the season, on January 19, 2010, Milan opted to undergo arthroscopic knee surgery and forgo participating in the 2010 Winter Olympics with the Czech Republic to recoup. After over one month on the sidelines, Hejduk scored two goals against the St. Louis Blues to mark his return on March 7. In helping Colorado return to the Stanley Cup playoffs, he completed the year to place third on the team with 23 goals despite playing in a career-low 56 games. He scored just one goal in the 2010 playoffs before he succumbed to a head injury after a collision with line-mate Paul Stastny in Game 3 of the Western Conference Quarterfinals series defeat against the San Jose Sharks.

On May 11, 2011, Hejduk signed another one-year contract with the Avalanche effective for the 2011–12 season. On November 14, he was named the third captain in Avalanche history after a brief vacancy was left by Adam Foote's retirement. Hejduk saw a decline in his offensive production for his first season as captain. Scoring 14 goals and 37 points in 81 games, this ended his impressive career streak of 12-straight 20-plus-goal seasons. Shortly after the 2011–12 season, after the Avs would miss the playoffs for the second time in two years, Hejduk expressed his consideration to retire from the NHL. Despite these statements, on May 18, 2012, he signed a one-year contract with the Avalanche for the 2012–13 season worth $2 million. In September 2012, he relinquished his captaincy due to his role in the organization changing. He admitted to being happy to have given up his captaincy to a player who he thinks is going to be a franchise player for a long time.

In the lockout-shortened 2012–13 season, Hejduk became the last player drafted by the Quebec Nordiques still active in the NHL, after goaltender Tim Thomas opted for a year on hiatus. On February 4, 2013, in a 3–2 defeat to the Dallas Stars, Hejduk scored a goal in his 1,000th career NHL game. He became the first Avalanche player in history to appear in 1,000 games for the club and the 30th in NHL history to do so at a single franchise. On his 37th birthday, Hejduk scored a goal and a shoot-out goal in a 4–3 victory over the Minnesota Wild on February 14, 2013. The goal marked his 800th point in the NHL, becoming just the third Czech-born player in NHL history to reach the feat, behind only Jaromír Jágr and Patrik Eliáš. Despite the shortened season, Hejduk saw his scoring role reduced by head coach Joe Sacco. With injury and bouts of healthy scratches, he contributed from the checking lines with a career-low 4 goals and 11 points in only 29 games played.

Despite harbouring ambition to continue playing, Hejduk was not offered a new contract by the Avalanche upon the expiry of his contract. He finished his tenure ranked second in Quebec/Colorado franchise history in games played (1,020), fourth in goals (375) and points (805) and fifth in assists (430), while also the all-time franchise leader in overtime goals (9) and second in game-winning goals (59).

Reports surfaced on November 13, 2013, that Hejduk was ending his hockey career, which were confirmed after the 2014 Olympic break. At the time of his retirement, he was the last player to leave the Avalanche that had played on their 2001 Stanley Cup-winning team.

On September 13, 2017, it was announced that the Avalanche would retire Hejduk's number 23 jersey during the 2017–18 season, and it was officially retired on January 6, 2018.

=== NHL All-Star Games ===
Hejduk has been selected to play in three NHL All-Star Games. In the 2000 All-Star Game, he played on the World team in a 9–4 win over North America. He earned a primary assist on Pavol Demitra's third period goal. For the 2001 All-Star Game, he was chosen to replace an injured Jaromír Jágr in the starting line-up, one of the six Avalanche players selected as starters. However, he did not record a point in a 14–12 loss to North America. In 2009, he was selected as the only Av in the All-Star lineup for the year's Game. He recorded one goal and two assists in a 12–11 shootout loss to the Eastern Conference.

== Personal life ==
Hejduk is married to Zlatuse and has twin sons. In 2016, Hejduk became an American citizen.

== Career statistics ==
=== Regular season and playoffs ===
			Regular season					Playoffs
Season	Team	League	GP	G	A	Pts	PIM	GP	G	A	Pts	PIM
1993–94	HC Pardubice	ELH	20	7	2	9	4	10	3	1	4	0
1994–95	HC Pardubice	ELH	43	10	13	23	6	—	—	—	—	—
1995–96	HC Pojišťovna IB Pardubice	ELH	37	13	7	20	4	—	—	—	—	—
1996–97	HC Pojišťovna IB Pardubice	ELH	51	27	11	38	10	10	6	0	6	27
1997–98	HC IPB Pojišťovna Pardubice	ELH	49	26	17	43	20	3	0	0	0	2
1998–99	Colorado Avalanche	NHL	82	14	34	48	26	16	6	6	12	4
1999–2000	Colorado Avalanche	NHL	82	36	36	72	16	17	5	4	9	6
2000–01	Colorado Avalanche	NHL	80	41	38	79	36	23	7	16	23	6
2001–02	Colorado Avalanche	NHL	62	21	23	44	24	16	3	3	6	4
2002–03	Colorado Avalanche	NHL	82	50	48	98	32	7	2	2	4	2
2003–04	Colorado Avalanche	NHL	82	35	40	75	20	11	5	2	7	0
2004–05	HC Moeller Pardubice	ELH	48	25	26	51	14	16	6	2	8	6
2005–06	Colorado Avalanche	NHL	74	24	34	58	24	9	2	6	8	2
2006–07	Colorado Avalanche	NHL	80	35	35	70	44	—	—	—	—	—
2007–08	Colorado Avalanche	NHL	77	29	25	54	36	10	3	3	6	4
2008–09	Colorado Avalanche	NHL	82	27	32	59	16	—	—	—	—	—
2009–10	Colorado Avalanche	NHL	56	23	21	44	10	3	1	0	1	0
2010–11	Colorado Avalanche	NHL	71	22	34	56	18	—	—	—	—	—
2011–12	Colorado Avalanche	NHL	81	14	23	37	14	—	—	—	—	—
2012–13	Colorado Avalanche	NHL	29	4	7	11	0	—	—	—	—	—
ELH totals			248	108	76	184	58	39	15	3	18	35
NHL totals			1,020	375	430	805	316	112	34	42	76	28

=== International ===
Medal record

Men's ice hockey

Representing the Czech Republic

Winter Olympics
Gold medal – first place	1998 Nagano	
Bronze medal – third place	2006 Torino	

World Championships
Bronze medal – third place	1998 Basel	

Year	Team	Event	Result	GP	G	A	Pts	PIM
1995	Czech Republic	WJC	6th	7	1	3	4	14
1996	Czech Republic	WJC	4th	6	0	0	0	0
1998	Czech Republic	OG	1st place, gold medalist(s)	3	0	0	0	2
1998	Czech Republic	WC	3rd place, bronze medalist(s)	1	0	0	0	0
2002	Czech Republic	OG	7th	4	1	0	1	0
2003	Czech Republic	WC	4th	7	5	1	6	2
2004	Czech Republic	WCH	3rd place, bronze medalist(s)	4	3	2	5	2
2006	Czech Republic	OG	3rd place, bronze medalist(s)	8	2	1	3	2
Junior totals				13	1	3	4	14
Senior totals				27	11	4	15	8

== Awards and honours ==
Award	Year
NHL
All-Rookie Team	1998–99
All-Star Game	1999–2000, 2000–01, 2008–09
Stanley Cup champion	2000–01
Maurice "Rocket" Richard Trophy	2002–03
Bud Light Plus/Minus Award	2002–03
Second All-Star Team	2002–03

Preceded by Jarome Iginla	Winner of the Maurice "Rocket" Richard Trophy; 2003	Succeeded by Jarome Iginla; Ilya Kovalchuk; Rick Nash
Preceded by Chris Chelios	Co-winner of the NHL Plus/Minus Award; 2003; With: Peter Forsberg	Succeeded by Martin St. Louis; Marek Malík
Preceded by Jaromír Jágr	Golden Hockey Stick; 2003	Succeeded by Robert Lang
Preceded by Adam Foote	Colorado Avalanche captain 2011–12	Succeeded by Gabriel Landeskog
