= 2002–03 NHL transactions =

The following is a list of all team-to-team transactions that have occurred in the National Hockey League during the 2002–03 NHL season. It lists what team each player has been traded to, signed by, or claimed by, and for which players or draft picks, if applicable.

== Waiver ==
August 6, 2002	To Pittsburgh Penguins Dick Tarnstrom	To New York Islanders Claimed on waivers
October 4, 2002	To New York Rangers Jamie Lundmark	To Calgary Flames Claimed on waivers
November 2, 2002	To Minnesota Wild Andrei Zyuzin	To New Jersey Devils Claimed on waivers
January 1, 2003	To Philadelphia Flyers Tomi Kallio	To Columbus Blue Jackets Claimed on waivers
January 15, 2003	To Washington Capitals Josh Green	To New York Rangers Claimed on waivers
February 21, 2003	To Montreal Canadiens Gordie Dwyer	To New York Rangers Claimed on waivers
March 11, 2003	To Nashville Predators Todd Warriner	To Philadelphia Flyers Claimed on waivers
March 11, 2003	To Tampa Bay Lightning Janne Laukkanen	To Pittsburgh Penguins Claimed on waivers

== May ==
May 13, 2002	To Toronto Maple Leafs Richard Jackman	To Boston Bruins rights to Kris Vernarsky
May 15, 2002	To Nashville Predators Steve Parsons	To Pittsburgh Penguins future considerations
May 24, 2002	To Montreal Canadiens 5th-rd pick - 2002 entry draft (CGY - #141 - Jiri Cetkovsky)^{1}	To Minnesota Wild Chris Dyment

1. Montreal's acquired fifth-round pick went to Calgary as the result of a trade on June 23, 2002 that sent a fourth-round pick (# 99 overall) in the 2002 Entry Draft to Montreal in exchange for a fourth-round pick (# 112 overall) in the 2002 Entry Draft this pick.

== June (Pre Draft Day) ==
June 12, 2002	To Dallas Stars 1st-rd pick - 2002 entry draft (# 26 - Martin Vagner); 2nd-rd pick - 2002 entry draft (# 42 - Marius Holtet); 6th-rd pick - 2003 entry draft (# 185 - Francis Wathier)	To Washington Capitals 1st-rd pick - 2002 entry draft (# 13 - Alexander Semin)
June 12, 2002	To Phoenix Coyotes Brian Boucher; 3rd-rd pick - 2002 entry draft (# 70 - Joe Callahan)	To Philadelphia Flyers Robert Esche; Michal Handzus
June 18, 2002	To Dallas Stars Ron Tugnutt; 2nd-rd pick - 2002 entry draft (# 32 -Janos Vas)	To Columbus Blue Jackets 1st-rd pick - 2002 entry draft (BUF - # 20 - Daniel Paille)^{1}
June 18, 2002	To Edmonton Oilers Jiri Dopita	To Philadelphia Flyers 3rd-rd pick - 2003 entry draft (# 87 - Ryan Potulny) conditional 5th-rd pick - 2004 entry draft^{2}
June 21, 2002	To Tampa Bay Lightning Ruslan Fedotenko; 2nd-rd pick - 2002 entry draft (DAL - # 34 - Tobias Stephan)^{3} 2nd-rd pick - 2002 entry draft (SJS - # 52 - Dan Spang)^{4}	To Philadelphia Flyers 1st-rd pick - 2002 entry draft (# 4 - Joni Pitkanen)

1. Columbus' acquired first-round pick went to Buffalo as the result of a trade on June 22, 2002 that sent the rights to Mike Pandolfo and a first-round pick (# 30 overall) in the 2002 entry draft to Columbus in exchange for this pick.
2. The conditions of this pick are unknown and was not exercised.
3. Tampa Bay's acquired second-round pick went to Dallas as the result of a trade on June 22, 2002 that sent Brad Lukowich and a seventh-round pick in the 2003 entry draft to Tampa Bay in exchange for this pick.
4. Tampa Bay's acquired second-round pick went to San Jose as the result of a trade on June 22, 2002 that sent a second-round pick (# 60 overall) and a fifth-round pick in the 2002 entry draft to Tampa Bay in exchange for this pick.

== June (NHL Entry Draft - Day 1) ==
June 22, 2002	To Columbus Blue Jackets 1st-rd pick - 2002 entry draft (# 1 - Rick Nash)	To Florida Panthers 1st-rd pick - 2002 entry draft (# 3 - Jay Bouwmeester) future considerations^{1}
June 22, 2002	To Florida Panthers future considerations^{2}	To Atlanta Thrashers 3rd-rd pick - 2002 entry draft (BUF - # 82 - John Adams)^{3} 4th-rd pick - 2003 entry draft (# 116 - Guillaume Desbiens)
June 22, 2002	To Mighty Ducks of Anaheim future considerations^{4}	To Nashville Predators 3rd-rd pick - 2002 entry draft (DET - # 95 - Valtteri Filppula)^{5}
June 22, 2002	To Calgary Flames 1st-rd pick - 2002 entry draft (# 10 - Eric Nystrom); 4th-rd pick - 2002 entry draft (MTL - # 99 - Michael Lambert)^{6}	To Florida Panthers 1st-rd pick - 2002 entry draft (# 9 - Petr Taticek)
June 22, 2002	To Montreal Canadiens 1st-rd pick - 2002 entry draft (# 14 - Chris Higgins)	To Edmonton Oilers 1st-rd pick - 2002 entry draft (# 15 - Jesse Niinimaki); 8th-rd pick - 2002 entry draft (# 245 - Tomas Micka)
June 22, 2002	To Buffalo Sabres 2nd-rd pick - 2002 entry draft (EDM - # 31 - Jeff Drouin-Deslauriers)^{7} 3rd-rd pick - 2002 entry draft (# 82 - John Adams)	To Atlanta Thrashers Vyacheslav Kozlov; 2nd-rd pick - 2002 entry draft (CBJ - # 41 - Joakim Lindstrom)^{8}
June 22, 2002	To Buffalo Sabres 1st-rd pick - 2002 entry draft (# 20 - Daniel Paille)	To Columbus Blue Jackets 1st-rd pick - 2002 entry draft (ATL - # 30 - Jim Slater)^{9} rights to Mike Pandolfo
June 22, 2002	To Columbus Blue Jackets 2nd-rd pick - 2002 entry draft (# 41 - Joakim Lindstrom); 3rd-rd pick - 2002 entry draft (# 96 - Jeff Genovy)	To Atlanta Thrashers 1st-rd pick - 2002 entry draft (# 30 - Jim Slater)
June 22, 2002	To Buffalo Sabres 2nd-rd pick - 2002 entry draft (EDM - # 36 - Jarret Stoll)^{10}	To Nashville Predators 3rd-rd pick - 2002 entry draft (TOR - # 88 - Dominic D'Amour)^{11} 2nd-rd pick - 2003 entry draft (# 35 - Konstantin Glazachev)
June 22, 2002	To Buffalo Sabres Jochen Hecht	To Edmonton Oilers 2nd-rd pick - 2002 entry draft (# 31 - Jeff Drouin-Deslauriers); 2nd-rd pick in 2002 entry draft (# 36 - Jarret Stoll)
June 22, 2002	To Dallas Stars 2nd-rd pick - 2002 entry draft (# 34 - Tobias Stephan)	To Nashville Predators Brad Lukowich; 7th-rd pick - 2003 entry draft (# 227 - Jay Rosehill)
June 22, 2002	To San Jose Sharks 2nd-rd pick - 2002 entry draft (# 52 - Dan Spang)	To Tampa Bay Lightning 2nd-rd pick - 2002 entry draft (# 60 - Adam Henrich); 5th-rd pick - 2002 entry draft (# 162 - Gerard Dicaire)
June 22, 2002	To Boston Bruins 2nd-rd pick - 2002 entry draft (# 56 - Vladislav Evseev)	To St. Louis Blues 2nd-rd pick - 2002 entry draft (# 62 - Andrei Mikhnov); 5th-rd pick - 2002 entry draft (# 165 - Justin Maiser)
June 22, 2002	To Florida Panthers 3rd-rd pick - 2002 entry draft (# 67 - Gregory Campbell)	To New York Islanders Eric Godard
June 22, 2002	To Toronto Maple Leafs 3rd-rd pick - 2002 entry draft (# 74 - Todd Ford)	To Calgary Flames 3rd-rd pick - 2002 entry draft (# 90 - Matthew Lombardi); 5th-rd pick - 2002 entry draft (# 159 - Kristofer Persson)
June 22, 2002	To New York Rangers 3rd-rd pick - 2002 entry draft (# 81 - Marcus Jonasen); 4th-rd pick - 2002 entry draft (# 127 - Nate Guenin)	To Ottawa Senators 2nd-rd pick - 2002 entry draft (# 75 - Arttu Luttinen)
June 22, 2002	To San Jose Sharks 3rd-rd pick - 2002 entry draft (# 86 - Jonas Fiedler)	To Chicago Blackhawks 3rd-rd pick - 2002 entry draft (# 93 - Alexander Kozhevnikov); 4th-rd pick - 2002 entry draft (# 128 - Matt Ellison)
June 22, 2002	To Toronto Maple Leafs 3rd-rd pick - 2002 entry draft (# 88 - Dominic D'Amour)	To Nashville Predators 3rd-rd pick - 2003 entry draft (# 92 - Alexander Sulzer)
June 22, 2002	To Carolina Hurricanes 3rd-rd pick - 2002 entry draft (# 91 - Jesse Lane)	To Philadelphia Flyers 6th-rd pick - 2002 entry draft (# 192 - Nikita Korovkin); 3rd-rd pick - 2003 entry draft (# 69 - Colin Fraser)
June 22, 2002	To Nashville Predators 3rd-rd pick - 2003 entry draft (# 98 - Grigory Shafigulin)	To Detroit Red Wings 3rd-rd pick - 2002 entry draft (# 95 - Valtteri Filppula)
June 22, 2002	To Los Angeles Kings 4th-rd pick - 2002 entry draft (# 104 - Aaron Rome)	To Minnesota Wild Cliff Ronning
June 22, 2002	To New York Islanders Mattias Timander	To Columbus Blue Jackets 4th-rd pick - 2002 entry draft (# 119 - Jekabs Redlihs)
June 22, 2002	To New York Islanders Arron Asham; 5th-rd pick - 2002 entry draft (# 149 - Markus Pahlsson)	To Montreal Canadiens Mariusz Czerkawski
June 22, 2002	To San Jose Sharks conditional 6th-rd pick - 2003 entry draft (NYR - # 179 - Phillip Furrer)^{14} future considerations (rights to Theo Fleury)^{14}	To New York Rangers 6th-rd pick - 2002 entry draft (# 194 - Kim Hirschovits)
June 22, 2002	To Minnesota Wild 9th-rd pick - 2002 entry draft (# 269 - Mika Hannula)	To Calgary Flames Jamie McLennan
June 22, 2002	To Nashville Predators conditional pick 2003 entry draft (3rd-rd pick - # 89 - Paul Brown)^{15}	To Washington Capitals Petr Sykora

1. Florida's option to swap first-round picks in the 2003 entry draft which was not exercised.
2. Atlanta's promise not to draft Jay Bouwmeester # 2 overall in the 2002 entry draft.
3. Atlanta's acquired third-round pick went to Buffalo as the result of a trade on June 22, 2002 that sent Vyacheslav Kozlov and a second-round pick (# 41 overall) in the 2002 entry draft to Atlanta in exchange for a second-round pick (# 31 overall) in the 2002 entry draft and this pick.
4. Nashville agreed not to select Joffrey Lupul # 6 overall in the 2002 entry draft.
5. Nashville's acquired third-round pick went to Detroit as the result of a trade on June 22, 2002 that sent a third-round pick in the 2003 entry draft to Nashville in exchange for this pick.
6. Calgary's acquired fourth-round pick went to Montreal as the result of a trade on June 23, 2002 that sent a fourth-round (# 112 overall) and a fifth-round pick in the 2002 entry draft to Calgary in exchange for this pick.
7. Buffalo's acquired second-round pick went to Edmonton as the result of a trade on June 22, 2002 that sent Jochen Hecht to Buffalo in exchange for a second-round pick (# 36 overall) in the 2002 entry draft and this pick.
8. Atlanta's acquired second-round pick went to Columbus as the result of a trade on June 22, 2002 that sent a first-round pick in the 2002 entry draft to Atlanta in exchange for a third-round pick in the 2002 entry draft and this pick.
9. Columbus' acquired first-round pick went to Atlanta as the result of a trade on June 22, 2002 that sent a second-round pick and a third-round pick in the 2002 entry draft to Columbus in exchange for this pick.
10. Buffalo's acquired second-round pick went to Edmonton as the result of a trade on June 22, 2002 that sent Jochen Hecht to Buffalo in exchange for a second-round pick (# 31 overall) in the 2002 entry draft and this pick.
11. Nashville's acquired third-round pick went to Toronto as the result of a trade on June 22, 2002 that sent a third-round pick in the 2003 entry draft to Nashville in exchange for this pick.
12. Conditions of this pick was subject to the completion of the future considerations part of the trade. The pick was returned when the Rangers sent the rights to Theo Fleury to San Jose to completed the trade on June 26, 2002.
13. The conditions of this pick are unknown.

== June (NHL Entry Draft - Day 2) ==
June 23, 2002	To Montreal Canadiens 4th-rd pick - 2002 entry draft (# 99 - Michael Lambert)	To Calgary Flames 4th-rd pick - 2002 entry draft (# 112 - Yuri Artemenkov); 5th-rd pick - 2002 entry draft (# 141 - Jiri Cetkovsky)
June 23, 2002	To Tampa Bay Lightning 6th-rd pick - 2002 entry draft (# 174 - Karri Akkanen); 8th-rd pick - 2002 entry draft (# 255 - Ryan Craig); 8th-rd pick - 2002 entry draft (# 256 - Darren Reid); 9th-rd pick - 2002 entry draft (# 286 - Alexei Glukhov)	To Carolina Hurricanes 4th-rd pick 2003 entry draft (# 130 - Matej Trojovsky)
June 23, 2002	To Columbus Blue Jackets 6th-rd pick - 2002 entry draft (# 184 - Jaroslav Balastik); 7th-rd pick - 2002 entry draft (# 225 - Steven Goertzen)	To Philadelphia Flyers 5th-rd pick - 2003 entry draft (# 140 - David Tremblay)
June 23, 2002	To San Jose Sharks Rich Pilon	To St. Louis Blues conditional 7th-round - 2002 entry draft^{1}
June 23, 2002	To Tampa Bay Lightning 7th-rd pick - 2002 entry draft (# 213 - Fredrik Norrena)	To Ottawa Senators Josef Boumedienne
June 23, 2002	To San Jose Sharks 7th-rd pick - 2002 entry draft (# 217 - Tim Conboy)	To Atlanta Thrashers 8th-rd pick - 2002 entry draft (# 257 - Pauli Levokari); 7th-rd pick - 2003 entry draft (# 203 - Denis Loginov)
June 23, 2002	To Columbus Blue Jackets 9th-rd pick - 2002 entry draft (# 263 - Sergei Mozyakin)	To Florida Panthers 9th-rd pick - 2003 entry draft (# 264 - John Hecimovic)
June 23, 2002	To New York Rangers Krzysztof Oliwa	To Pittsburgh Penguins 9th-rd pick - 2003 entry draft (TBL - # 273 - Albert Vishnyakov)^{2}
June 23, 2002	To Toronto Maple Leafs Josh Holden	To Vancouver Canucks Jeff Farkas

1. The conditions of the pick are unknown and it was not exercised.
2. Pittsburgh's acquired ninth-round pick went to Tampa Bay as the result of a trade on May 12, 2003 that sent Marc Bergevin to Pittsburgh in exchange for this pick.

== June (Post Draft Day) ==
June 25, 2002	To Boston Bruins Steve Shields	To Mighty Ducks of Anaheim 3rd-rd pick - 2003 entry draft (# 86 - Shane Hynes)
June 25, 2002	To Toronto Maple Leafs Ryan Bonni	To Vancouver Canucks 8th-rd pick - 2003 entry draft (# 252 - Sergei Topol)
June 29, 2002	To Atlanta Thrashers Shawn McEachern; 6th-rd pick - 2004 entry draft (# 186 - Dan Turple)	To Ottawa Senators Brian Pothier
June 29, 2002	To Dallas Stars David Gosselin; 5th-rd pick - 2003 entry draft (# 144 - Eero Kilpelainen)	To Nashville Predators rights to Cameron Mann rights to Ed Belfour
June 30, 2002	To Edmonton Oilers rights to Mike Richter	To New York Rangers 4th-rd pick - 2003 entry draft (# 122 - Corey Potter)
June 30, 2002	To Toronto Maple Leafs 8th-rd pick - 2003 entry draft (# 237 - Shaun Landolt)	To Nashville Predators rights to Tie Domi
June 30, 2002	To Toronto Maple Leafs 3rd-rd pick - 2003 entry draft (MIN - # 78 - Danny Irmen)^{1} conditional 8th-rd pick - 2004 entry draft^{2}	To Calgary Flames rights to Curtis Joseph
June 30, 2002	To Montreal Canadiens 4th-rd pick - 2004 entry draft (# 100 - James Wyman)	To Chicago Blackhawks Sergei Berezin

1. Toronto's acquired third-round pick went to Minnesota as the result of a trade on June 21, 2003 that sent a third-round pick (# 91 overall) and a fourth-round pick in the 2003 entry draft to Toronto in exchange for this pick.
2. The conditions of this pick are unknown and was not exercised.

== July ==
July 3, 2002	To New York Islanders Jason Wiemer	To Florida Panthers Branislav Mezei
July 6, 2002	To New Jersey Devils Jeff Friesen; Oleg Tverdovsky; Maxim Balmochnykh	To Mighty Ducks of Anaheim Petr Sykora; J. F. Damphousse; Mike Commodore rights to Igor Pohanka
July 16, 2002	To San Jose Sharks 7th-rd pick - 2003 entry draft (# 201 - Jonathan Tremblay)	To Florida Panthers Hannes Hyvonen
July 16, 2002	To Los Angeles Kings Derek Armstrong	To New York Rangers conditional 6th-rd pick - 2003 entry draft (# 180 - Chris Holt)^{1}
July 18, 2002	To Toronto Maple Leafs rights to Robert Svehla	To Florida Panthers Dmitry Yushkevich
July 24, 2002	To Buffalo Sabres Adam Mair; 5th-rd pick - 2003 entry draft (# 150 - Thomas Morrow)	To New York Rangers Erik Rasmussen

1. The conditions of this pick are unknown.

== September ==
September 4, 2002	To Toronto Maple Leafs Brad Leeb	To Vancouver Canucks rights to Tomas Mosjzis
September 10, 2002	To Calgary Flames Ladislav Kohn	To Detroit Red Wings future considerations
September 21, 2002	To Vancouver Canucks Sami Salo	To Ottawa Senators Peter Schaefer

== October ==
October 1, 2002	To Florida Panthers Jani Hurme	To Ottawa Senators Billy Thompson; Greg Watson
October 1, 2002	To Colorado Avalanche Dean McAmmond; Jeff Shantz; Derek Morris	To Calgary Flames Chris Drury; Stephane Yelle
October 4, 2002	To Dallas Stars Stephane Robidas	To Atlanta Thrashers 6th-rd pick - 2003 entry draft (DAL - # 195 - Drew Bagnall)^{1}
October 4, 2002	To Columbus Blue Jackets rights to Petr Tenkrat	To Florida Panthers Mathieu Biron
October 7, 2002	To Edmonton Oilers 2nd-rd pick - 2003 entry draft (NYI - # 53 - Evgeny Tunik)^{2} 3rd-rd pick - 2003 entry draft (# 94 - Zack Stortini)	To Washington Capitals Mike Grier
October 10, 2002	To New York Rangers Gordie Dwyer	To Tampa Bay Lightning Boyd Kane
October 11, 2002	To Florida Panthers Juraj Kolnik; 9th-rd pick - 2003 entry draft (SJ - # 276 - Carter Lee)^{3}	To New York Islanders Sven Butenschon
October 23, 2002	To Mighty Ducks of Anaheim future considerations	To Nashville Predators Jason York
October 31, 2002	To Montreal Canadiens Sylvain Blouin	To Minnesota Wild 7th-rd pick - 2003 entry draft (# 207 - Georgi Misharin)

1. Dallas' sixth-round pick was re-acquired as the result of a trade on March 11, 2003 that sent the rights to Anthony Aquino to Atlanta in exchange for future considerations and this pick.
2. Edmonton's acquired second-round pick went to the Islanders as the result of a trade on March 11, 2003 that sent Brad Isbister and Raffi Torres to Edmonton in exchange for Janne Niinimaa and this pick.
3. Chicago's acquired ninth-round pick went to San Jose as the result of a trade on June 22, 2003 that sent an eighth-round pick in the 2004 entry draft to Chicago in exchange for this pick.
  Chicago previously acquired this pick as the result of a trade on June 22, 2003 that sent Dmitri Tolkunov to Florida in exchange for this pick.

== November ==
November 1, 2002	To Vancouver Canucks Darren Langdon; Marek Malik	To Carolina Hurricanes Harold Druken; Jan Hlavac
November 1, 2002	To Chicago Blackhawks Andrei Nikolishin; Chris Simon	To Washington Capitals Michael Nylander; 3rd-rd pick - 2003 entry draft (# 83 - Stephen Werner) future considerations
November 15, 2002	To Calgary Flames Ruslan Zainullin	To Atlanta Thrashers Marc Savard
November 16, 2002	To Detroit Red Wings Jason Woolley	To Buffalo Sabres future considerations
November 26, 2002	To Los Angeles Kings Dmitri Yushkevich; 5th-rd pick - 2003 entry draft (# 152 - Brady Murray)	To Florida Panthers Andreas Lilja; Jaroslav Bednar

== December ==
December 2, 2002	To Atlanta Thrashers Chris Nielsen rights to Petteri Nummelin	To Columbus Blue Jackets Tomi Kallio; Pauli Levokari
December 5, 2002	To St. Louis Blues future considerations	To Colorado Avalanche Dale Clarke
December 6, 2002	To Philadelphia Flyers Marcus Ragnarsson	To San Jose Sharks Dan McGillis
December 12, 2002	To New York Rangers Mike Dunham	To Nashville Predators Tomas Kloucek; Rem Murray rights to Marek Zidlicky
December 12, 2002	To New York Rangers Josh Green	To Edmonton Oilers conditional draft pick - 2004 entry draft^{1}
December 16, 2002	To Washington Capitals Josef Boumedienne	To Ottawa Senators Dean Melanson
December 19, 2002	To Phoenix Coyotes Paul Ranheim	To Philadelphia Flyers conditional draft pick - 2004 entry draft^{1}
December 31, 2002	To Toronto Maple Leafs Nathan Perrott	To Nashville Predators Bob Wren
December 31, 2002	To Phoenix Coyotes Jean-Marc Pelletier conditional draft pick - 2003 entry draft^{1}	To Carolina Hurricanes Patrick DesRochers

1. Conditions of these draft picks are unknown and was not exercised.

== January ==
January 6, 2003	To Boston Bruins Krzysztof Oliwa	To New York Rangers 9th-rd pick - 2004 entry draft (SJS - # 288 - Brian Mahoney-Wilson)^{1}
January 8, 2003	To New York Rangers Boris Mironov	To Chicago Blackhawks 4th-rd pick - 2004 entry draft (DAL - # 104 - Fredrik Naslund)^{2}
January 13, 2003	To Boston Bruins 4th-rd pick - 2004 entry draft (SJS - # 129 - Jason Churchill)^{3}	To Tampa Bay Lightning John Grahame
January 15, 2003	To Washington Capitals Joel Kwiatkowski	To Ottawa Senators 9th-rd pick - 2003 entry draft (WSH - # 279 - Mark Olafson)^{4}
January 16, 2003	To Phoenix Coyotes Scott Pellerin conditional 4th-rd pick - 2004 entry draft (# 119 - Kevin Porter)^{5}	To Dallas Stars Claude Lemieux
January 17, 2003	To Boston Bruins 9th-rd pick - 2004 entry draft (SJS - # 288 - Brian Mahoney-Wilson)^{6}	To New York Rangers Jay Henderson
January 20, 2003	To Vancouver Canucks Chris Herperger; Chris Nielsen	To Atlanta Thrashers Jeff Farkas
January 22, 2003	To Philadelphia Flyers Jamie Wright	To Calgary Flames future considerations
January 22, 2003	To Montreal Canadiens Niklas Sundstrom; 3rd-rd pick - 2004 entry draft (LAK - # 95 - Paul Baier)^{6}	To San Jose Sharks Jeff Hackett
January 22, 2003	To Boston Bruins Jeff Hackett; Jeff Jillson	To San Jose Sharks Kyle McLaren; 4th-rd pick - 2004 entry draft (# 126 - Torrey Mitchell)
January 22, 2003	To Calgary Flames Mike Mottau	To New York Rangers Rangers' option of a 6th-rd pick – 2003 entry draft (# 176 – Ivan Dornic) or 2004 entry draft
January 24, 2003	To New Jersey Devils Steve Kariya	To Vancouver Canucks Mikko Jokela
January 29, 2003	To Montreal Canadiens 2nd-rd pick - 2003 entry draft (# 61 - Maxim Lapierre)	To Philadelphia Flyers Eric Chouinard
January 30, 2003	To Mighty Ducks of Anaheim Sandis Ozolinsh; Lance Ward	To Florida Panthers Matt Cullen; Pavel Trnka; 4th-rd pick - 2003 entry draft (# 124 - James Pemberton)

1. Boston's sixth-round pick went to San Jose as the result of a trade on June 26, 2004 that sent a second-round pick in the 2004 entry draft to Boston in exchange for a third-round pick and a fourth-round pick in the 2004 entry draft along with this pick.
  Boston's ninth-round pick was re-acquired as the result of a trade on January 17, 2003 that sent Jay Henderson to the Rangers in exchange for this pick.
2. Chicago's acquired fourth-round pick went to Dallas Stars as the result of a trade on November 17, 2003 that sent Jon Klemm and a second-round pick in the 2004 entry draft to Chicago in exchange for Stephane Robidas and this pick.
3. Boston's acquired fourth-round pick went to San Jose as the result of a trade on June 26, 2004 that sent a second-round pick in the 2004 Entry Draft to Boston in exchange for a third-round pick and ninth-round pick in the 2004 Entry Draft along with this pick.
4. Washington's ninth-round pick was re-acquired as the result of a trade on June 20, 2003 that sent a ninth-round pick in the 2004 entry draft to Ottawa in exchange for this pick.
5. The conditions of this pick are unknown.
6. Boston's sixth-round pick went to San Jose as the result of a trade on June 26, 2004 that sent a second-round pick in the 2004 entry draft to Boston in exchange for a third-round pick and a fourth-round pick in the 2004 entry draft along with this pick.
7. Montreal's acquired third-round pick went to Los Angeles as the result of a trade on June 26, 2004 that sent Radek Bonk and Cristobal Huet to Montreal in exchange for Mathieu Garon and this pick.

== February ==
February 4, 2003	To Los Angeles Kings Greg Koehler	To Nashville Predators Future considerations
February 5, 2003	To Colorado Avalanche Chris McAllister	To Philadelphia Flyers 6th-rd pick - 2003 entry draft (# 193 - Ville Hostikka)
February 5, 2003	To Philadelphia Flyers Todd Warriner	To Vancouver Canucks Future considerations
February 7, 2003	To Philadelphia Flyers Sami Kapanen; Ryan Bast	To Carolina Hurricanes Pavel Brendl; Bruno St. Jacques
February 9, 2003	To San Jose Sharks conditional 5th-rd pick - 2003 entry draft (# 139 - Patrick Ehelechner)^{1}	To Pittsburgh Penguins Shawn Heins
February 9, 2003	To Calgary Flames Andrew Ference	To Pittsburgh Penguins conditional 3rd-rd pick - 2004 entry draft (# 85 - Brian Gifford)^{2}
February 10, 2003	To New York Rangers Alexei Kovalev; Janne Laukkanen; Mike Wilson; Dan LaCouture	To Pittsburgh Penguins Mikael Samuelsson; Joel Bouchard; Rico Fata; Richard Lintner
February 17, 2003	To Dallas Stars Andy Berenzweig conditional pick - 2004 entry draft^{3}	To Nashville Predators Jon Sim
February 20, 2003	To Minnesota Wild Jay Henderson	To New York Rangers Cory Larose
February 24, 2003	To New Jersey Devils Pascal Rheaume	To Atlanta Thrashers conditional 6th-rd pick - 2004 entry draft^{4} ( NJD - # 185 - Josh Disher)^{5} conditional 8th-rd pick - 2004 entry draft^{6} ( NJD - # 250 - Nathan Perkovich)^{7}
February 25, 2003	To Buffalo Sabres Jakub Klepis	To Ottawa Senators Vaclav Varada; 5th-rd pick - 2003 entry draft (# 142 - Tim Cook)

1. The conditions of this pick are unknown.
2. The conditions of this pick are unknown.
3. The conditions of this pick are unknown and was not exercised.
4. The conditions of this pick are unknown.
5. New Jersey's sixth-round pick was re-acquired as the result of a trade on March 10, 2003 that sent a fourth-round pick in the 2003 entry draft to Atlanta in exchange for Richard Smehlik, an eighth-round pick in the 2004 Entry Draft and this pick.
6. The conditions of this pick are unknown.
7. New Jersey's eight-round pick was re-acquired as the result of a trade on March 10, 2003 that sent a fourth-round pick in the 2003 entry draft to Atlanta in exchange for Richard Smehlik, a sixth-round pick in the 2004 Entry Draft and this pick.

== March 1–10 ==
March 1, 2003	To Philadelphia Flyers Dmitri Yushkevich	To Los Angeles Kings 4th-rd pick - 2003 entry draft (BOS - # 129 - Patrik Valcak)^{1} 7th-rd pick - 2004 entry draft (# 221 - Daniel Taylor)
March 3, 2003	To Montreal Canadiens 4th-rd pick - 2003 entry draft (WAS - # 109 - Andreas Valdix)^{2}	To Nashville Predators Oleg Petrov
March 4, 2003	To Florida Panthers Simon Lajeunesse	To Ottawa Senators Joey Tetarenko
March 5, 2003	To Toronto Maple Leafs Owen Nolan	To San Jose Sharks Brad Boyes; Alyn McCauley; 1st-rd pick - 2003 entry draft (BOS - # 21 - Mark Stuart)^{3}
March 8, 2003	To San Jose Sharks 3rd-rd pick - 2003 entry draft (CGY - # 97 - Ryan Donally)^{4} 5th-rd pick - 2003 entry draft (COL - # 221 - Brad Richardson)^{5}	To Colorado Avalanche Bryan Marchment
March 8, 2003	To Phoenix Coyotes Brad Ference	To Florida Panthers Darcy Hordichuk; 2nd-rd pick - 2003 entry draft (TBL - # 41 - Matt Smaby)^{6}
March 9, 2003	To Nashville Predators Wade Flaherty	To Florida Panthers Pascal Trepanier
March 9, 2003	To Philadelphia Flyers Claude Lapointe	To New York Islanders 5th-rd pick - 2003 entry draft (PIT - # 161 -Evgeny Isakov)^{7}
March 9, 2003	To New York Islanders Randy Robitaille	To Pittsburgh Penguins 5th-rd pick - 2003 entry draft (# 161 - Evgeny Isakov)
March 9, 2003	To Toronto Maple Leafs Glen Wesley	To Carolina Hurricanes 2nd-rd pick - 2004 entry draft (CBJ - # 59 - Kyle Wharton)^{8}
March 10, 2003	To New Jersey Devils Richard Smehlik; 6th-rd pick - 2004 entry draft (# 185 -Josh Disher); 8th-rd pick - 2004 entry draft (# 250 - Nathan Perkovich)	To Atlanta Thrashers 4th-rd pick - 2003 entry draft (# 136 - Mike Vannelli)
March 10, 2003	To Dallas Stars Lyle Odelein	To Chicago Blackhawks Sami Helenius; Chicago's option of a 8th-rd pick – 2003 entry draft or 7th-rd pick – 2004 entry draft (# 214 – Troy Brouwer)
March 10, 2003	To Buffalo Sabres Michael Ryan; 2nd-rd pick – 2003 entry draft (# 65 – Branislav Fabry)	To Dallas Stars Stu Barnes
March 10, 2003	To Nashville Predators future considerations	To Ottawa Senators Bob Wren
March 10, 2003	To Buffalo Sabres future considerations	To Ottawa Senators Rob Ray
March 10, 2003	To Buffalo Sabres Daniel Briere; 3rd-rd pick – 2004 entry draft (# 71 – Andrej Sekera)	To Phoenix Coyotes Chris Gratton; 4th-rd pick - 2004 entry draft (EDM - # 112 - Liam Reddox)^{9}
March 10, 2003	To New Jersey Devils Grant Marshall	To Columbus Blue Jackets conditional draft pick - 2004 entry draft^{10} (CGY - 4th-rd - # 121 - Kristopher Hogg)^{11}
March 10, 2003	To Philadelphia Flyers Tony Amonte	To Phoenix Coyotes Guillaume Lefebvre; 3rd-rd pick - 2003 entry draft (# 77 - Tyler Redenbach); 3rd-rd pick - 2004 entry draft (NYR - # 60 - Brandon Dubinsky)^{12}

1. Los Angeles' acquired fourth-round pick went to Boston as the result of a trade on June 20, 2003 that sent Jozef Stumpel and a seventh-round pick in the 2003 entry draft to Los Angeles in exchange for a second-round pick in the 2004 entry draft and this pick.
2. Montreal's acquired third-round pick went to Washington as the result of a trade on June 1, 2003 that a fourth-round pick (# 123 overall) and a seventh-round pick in the 2003 entry draft to Montreal in exchange for this pick.
3. San Jose's acquired first-round pick went to Boston as the result of a trade on June 21, 2003 that sent a first-round pick (# 16 overall) in the 2003 entry draft to San Jose in exchange for a second-round pick and a fourth-round pick in the 2003 entry draft along with this pick.
4. San Jose's acquired third-round pick went to Calgary as the result of a trade on June 21, 2003 that sent a second-round pick in the 2003 entry draft to San Jose in exchange for two fifth-round picks in the 2003 entry draft (# 143 & 173 overall) and this pick.
5. Colorado's fifth-round pick was re-acquired as the result of a trade on June 20, 2003 that sent Scott Parker to San Jose in exchange for this pick.
6. Florida's acquired second-round pick went to Tampa Bay as the result of a trade on June 21, 2003 that sent a first-round pick in the 2003 entry draft to Florida in exchange for a second-round pick (# 34 overall) and a sixth-round pick in the 2003 entry draft along with this pick.
7. The Islanders' acquired fifth-round pick went to Pittsburgh as the result of a trade on March 9, 2003 that sent Randy Robitaille to the Islanders in exchange for this pick.
8. Carolina's acquired second-round pick went to Columbus as the result of a trade on June 26, 2004 that sent a first-round pick (# 4 overall) in the 2004 entry draft to Carolina in exchange for a first-round pick (# 8 overall) in the 2004 entry draft and this pick.
9. Phoenix's acquired fourth-round pick went to Edmonton as the result of a trade on June 26, 2004 that sent Jason Chimera and a third-round pick in the 2004 entry draft to Phoenix in exchange for a second-round pick in the 2004 entry draft and this pick.
10. The conditions of this pick are unknown.
11. Carolina's acquired fourth-round pick went to Calgary as the result of a trade on July 16, 2003 that sent Bob Boughner to Carolina in exchange for a fifth-round pick in the 2005 entry draft and this pick.
  Carolina previously acquired this pick as the result of a trade on June 22, 2003 that sent a fifth-round pick and sixth-round pick in the 2003 entry draft to Columbus in exchange for this pick.
12. Phoenix's acquired second-round pick went to the Rangers as the result of a trade on June 26, 2004 that sent a second-round pick (# 50 overall) in the 2004 entry draft to Phoenix in exchange for a third-round pick in 2004 entry draft and this pick.

== March 11 - trade deadline ==
March 11, 2003	To Minnesota Wild Johan Holmqvist	To New York Rangers Lawrence Nycholat
March 11, 2003	To Dallas Stars 6th-rd pick - 2003 entry draft (# 195 - Drew Bagnall) future considerations	To Atlanta Thrashers Anthony Aquino
March 11, 2003	To Boston Bruins Dan McGillis	To San Jose Sharks 2nd-rd pick - 2003 entry draft (NYR - # 50 - Ivan Baranka)^{1}
March 11, 2003	To San Jose Sharks Wayne Primeau	To Pittsburgh Penguins Matt Bradley
March 11, 2003	To Los Angeles Kings rights to Tim Gleason future considerations	To Ottawa Senators Bryan Smolinski
March 11, 2003	To Los Angeles Kings Sean Avery; Maxim Kuznetsov; 1st-rd pick - 2003 entry draft (# 27 - Jeff Tambellini); 2nd-rd pick - 2004 entry draft (BOS - # 64 - Martins Karsums)^{2}	To Detroit Red Wings Mathieu Schneider
March 11, 2003	To New York Rangers Anson Carter; Aleš Píša	To Edmonton Oilers Radek Dvorak; Cory Cross
March 11, 2003	To Nashville Predators Alexander Riazantsev	To Colorado Avalanche 7th-rd pick - 2003 entry draft (# 209 - Linus Videll)
March 11, 2003	To Boston Bruins Ian Moran	To Pittsburgh Penguins 4th-rd pick - 2003 entry draft (# 121 - Paul Bissonnette)
March 11, 2003	To Pittsburgh Penguins Guillaume Lefebvre; Dan Focht; Ramzi Abid	To Phoenix Coyotes Jan Hrdina; Francois Leroux
March 11, 2003	To Pittsburgh Penguins Mathias Johansson; Micki DuPont	To Calgary Flames Shean Donovan
March 11, 2003	To Tampa Bay Lightning Marc Bergevin	To Pittsburgh Penguins Brian Holzinger
March 11, 2003	To St. Louis Blues Valeri Bure conditional 5th-rd pick - 2004 entry draft (# 136 - Nikita Nikitin)^{3}	To Florida Panthers Mike Van Ryn
March 11, 2003	To Edmonton Oilers Brad Isbister; Raffi Torres	To New York Islanders Janne Niinimaa; 2nd-rd pick - 2003 entry draft (# 53 - Evgeni Tunik)
March 11, 2003	To Mighty Ducks of Anaheim Steve Thomas	To Chicago Blackhawks 5th-rd pick - 2003 entry draft (# 156 - Alexei Ivanov)
March 11, 2003	To Mighty Ducks of Anaheim Rob Niedermayer	To Calgary Flames Mike Commodore; Jean-Francois Damphousse
March 11, 2003	To Toronto Maple Leafs Phil Housley	To Chicago Blackhawks 9th-rd pick - 2003 entry draft (# 282 - Chris Porter); Chicago's option of a 4th-rd pick - 2003 entry draft or 4th-rd pick - 2004 entry draft (# 123 - Karel Hromas)
March 11, 2003	To Toronto Maple Leafs Doug Gilmour	To Montreal Canadiens 6th-rd pick - 2003 entry draft (# 188 - Mark Flood)
March 11, 2003	To St. Louis Blues Chris Osgood; 3rd-rd pick - 2003 entry draft (# 84 - Konstantin Barulin)	To New York Islanders Justin Papineau; 2nd-rd pick - 2003 entry draft (# 58 - Jeremy Colliton)
March 11, 2003	To Colorado Avalanche Bates Battaglia	To Carolina Hurricanes Radim Vrbata
March 11, 2003	To Chicago Blackhawks future considerations	To Philadelphia Flyers Peter White
March 11, 2003	To Calgary Flames Dean McAmmond	To Colorado Avalanche Colorado's option of a 5th-rd pick - 2003 entry draft (# 146 - Mark McCutcheon) or 5th-rd pick - 2004 entry draft
March 11, 2003	To Phoenix Coyotes 3rd-rd pick - 2003 entry draft (# 80 - Dmitri Pestunov)	To Vancouver Canucks Brad May
March 11, 2003	To Chicago Blackhawks 4th-rd pick - 2004 entry draft (PHI - # 101 - R.J. Anderson)^{4}	To Washington Capitals Sergei Berezin

1. San Jose's acquired second-round pick went to the Rangers as the result of a trade on June 21, 2003 that sent a second-round pick (# 43 overall) in the 2003 entry draft to San Jose in exchange for third-round pick in the 2003 entry draft and this pick.
2. Los Angeles' acquired second-round pick went to Boston as the result of a trade on June 20, 2003 that sent Jozef Stumpel and a seventh-round pick in the 2003 entry draft to Los Angeles in exchange for a fourth-round pick in the 2003 entry draft and this pick.
3. The conditions of the pick are unknown.
4. Chicago's acquired fourth-round pick went to Philadelphia as the result of a trade on February 19, 2004 that sent Jim Vandermeer, rights to Colin Fraser and a second-round pick in the 2004 Entry Draft to Chicago in exchange for Alexei Zhamnov and this pick.
