= Lozhkin =

Lozhkin (Russian: Ложкин, from ложка meaning spoon) is a Russian masculine surname, its feminine counterpart is Lozhkina. It may refer to

- Aleksey Lozhkin (born 1974), Belarusian ice hockey player
- Alisa Lozhkina, Ukrainian and American artist, art historian, curator, critic, and write
- Andrei Lozhkin (footballer) (born 1984), Russian football player
- Andrei Lozhkin (ice hockey) (born 1985), Russian ice hockey player
- Boris Lozhkin (born 1971), Ukrainian businessman and politician
- Nikita Lozhkin (born 1991), Russian ice hockey goaltender

== Fictional characters ==
- Nikolay Lozhkin from the fictional town of Veliky Guslyar
