= 2002–03 NHL season =

National Hockey League season

- League: National Hockey League
- Sport: Ice hockey
- Duration: October 9, 2002 – June 9, 2003
- Games: 82
- Teams: 30
- TV partner(s): CBC, TSN, RDS (Canada); ESPN, ABC (United States

Draft
- Top draft pick: Rick Nash
- Picked by: Columbus Blue Jackets

Regular season
- Presidents' Trophy: Ottawa Senators
- Season MVP: Peter Forsberg (Avalanche)
- Top scorer: Peter Forsberg (Avalanche)

Playoffs
- Playoffs MVP: Jean-Sebastien Giguere (Mighty Ducks)

Stanley Cup
- Champions: New Jersey Devils
- Runners-up: Mighty Ducks of Anaheim

Seasons
- 2001–02 2003–04

The 2002–03 NHL season was the 86th regular season of the National Hockey League. The Stanley Cup winners were the New Jersey Devils, who won the best of seven series 4–3 against the Mighty Ducks of Anaheim.

== League business ==
=== Entry draft ===
The 2002 NHL entry draft was held on June 22 and 23, 2002 at the Air Canada Centre in Toronto, Ontario. Rick Nash was selected first overall by the Columbus Blue Jackets.

=== Rule changes ===
The league approved the following rule changes:

- Following the death of Brittanie Cecil during the previous season, netting at both ends of the rink became mandatory, and the minimum height of the glass around the entire rink was raised to five feet (1.5 m).
- "Hurry-up" faceoff and line-change rules were implemented, similar to ones used by the American Hockey League. Except during the final two minutes of a game and after a goal is scored, the visiting team has five seconds to complete a line change during stoppages, and the home team has eight seconds. The linesman will then blow his whistle and drop the puck within five seconds, regardless if one or both teams' centres are lined up at the faceoff dot. If a centre is offside before getting properly lined up by the five seconds, he will get a warning before getting subsequent delay of game penalties.

== Arena changes ==
- The Carolina Hurricanes' home arena, Raleigh Sports and Entertainment Arena, was renamed RBC Center as part of a new naming rights agreement with RBC Bank.
- The Florida Panthers' home arena, National Car Rental Center, was renamed Office Depot Center as part of a new naming rights agreement with Office Depot.
- The Montreal Canadiens' home arena, Molson Centre, was renamed Bell Centre as part of a new naming rights agreement with Bell Canada.
- The San Jose Sharks' home arena, the Compaq Center, was renamed the HP Pavilion, in recognition of Compaq's parent company Hewlett-Packard (HP) retiring the Compaq brand.
- The Tampa Bay Lightning's home arena, the Ice Palace, was renamed the St. Pete Times Forum as part of a new naming rights agreement with the St. Petersburg Times newspaper.

== Regular season ==
=== All-Star Game ===
The All-Star Game was played on February 2, 2003, at Office Depot Center in Sunrise, the home of the Florida Panthers. The game returned to an Eastern Conference vs. Western Conference format.

=== Highlights ===
The regular season saw several surprises. The San Jose Sharks, who many felt would be one of the elite teams in the West, stumbled early and badly disassembled much of the team. The two-year-old Minnesota Wild, on the other hand, got out to an early start and held onto their first-ever playoff berth throughout the season, winning coach Jacques Lemaire the Jack Adams Award.

The most surprising team was probably the Tampa Bay Lightning, which many had predicted to finish last, winning their first Southeast Division title and making the playoffs for the first time in seven years. The most disappointing teams, other than the Sharks, were the New York Rangers, who finished out of the playoffs again despite bearing the league's leading payroll, and the Carolina Hurricanes, who finished last overall after a surprise run to the Stanley Cup Finals the year before. On January 8, 2003, Chicago Blackhawks goaltender Michael Leighton gained a shutout in his NHL debut in a 0–0 tie versus the Phoenix Coyotes. Coyotes goaltender Zac Bierk earned his first career shutout, although it was not his NHL debut. It was the first—and with the abolition of ties two years later, the only—time that two goalies in the same game both earned their first career shutouts.

At the midpoint of the season, the Canucks led the Western Conference and Ottawa led the East. Vancouver stumbled somewhat over the stretch and lost the Northwest Division title to Colorado and the Western Conference to Dallas. Ottawa continued to dominate, having the best season in franchise history and winning both the Eastern Conference and the Presidents' Trophy.

The season was also marred by financial difficulties. Despite their success, the Ottawa Senators were in bankruptcy protection for almost all of 2003, and at one point could not pay the players. Owner Rod Bryden tried a variety of innovative financing strategies, but these all failed and the team was purchased after the season by billionaire Eugene Melnyk. The Buffalo Sabres also entered bankruptcy protection before being bought by New York businessman Tom Golisano. The financial struggles of the Pittsburgh Penguins continued as the team continued to unload its most expensive players.

The season was marked by a great number of coaches being fired, from Bob Hartley in Colorado to Darryl Sutter in San Jose and Bryan Trottier of the New York Rangers.

Worries over the decline in scoring and the neutral zone trap continued. The season began with an attempted crack down on obstruction and interference, but by the midpoint of the season this effort had petered out.

== Standings ==
Note: W = Wins, L = Losses, T = Ties, OTL = Overtime Losses, GF = Goals For, GA = Goals Against, Pts = Points

=== Eastern Conference ===
Atlantic Division
| No. | CR | | GP | W | L | T | OTL | GF | GA | Pts |
|---|---|---|---|---|---|---|---|---|---|---|
| 1 | 2 | **New Jersey Devils** | 82 | 46 | 20 | 10 | 6 | 216 | 166 | 108 |
| 2 | 4 | **Philadelphia Flyers** | 82 | 45 | 20 | 13 | 4 | 211 | 166 | 107 |
| 3 | 8 | **New York Islanders** | 82 | 35 | 34 | 11 | 2 | 224 | 231 | 83 |
| 4 | 9 | New York Rangers | 82 | 32 | 36 | 10 | 4 | 210 | 231 | 78 |
| 5 | 14 | Pittsburgh Penguins | 82 | 27 | 44 | 6 | 5 | 189 | 255 | 65 |

Northeast Division
| No. | CR | | GP | W | L | T | OTL | GF | GA | Pts |
|---|---|---|---|---|---|---|---|---|---|---|
| 1 | 1 | **Ottawa Senators** | 82 | 52 | 21 | 8 | 1 | 263 | 182 | 113 |
| 2 | 5 | **Toronto Maple Leafs** | 82 | 44 | 28 | 7 | 3 | 236 | 208 | 98 |
| 3 | 7 | **Boston Bruins** | 82 | 36 | 31 | 11 | 4 | 245 | 237 | 87 |
| 4 | 10 | Montreal Canadiens | 82 | 30 | 35 | 8 | 9 | 206 | 234 | 77 |
| 5 | 12 | Buffalo Sabres | 82 | 27 | 37 | 10 | 8 | 190 | 219 | 72 |

Southeast Division
| No. | CR | | GP | W | L | T | OTL | GF | GA | Pts |
|---|---|---|---|---|---|---|---|---|---|---|
| 1 | 3 | **Tampa Bay Lightning** | 82 | 36 | 25 | 16 | 5 | 219 | 210 | 93 |
| 2 | 6 | **Washington Capitals** | 82 | 39 | 29 | 8 | 6 | 224 | 220 | 92 |
| 3 | 11 | Atlanta Thrashers | 82 | 31 | 39 | 7 | 5 | 226 | 284 | 74 |
| 4 | 13 | Florida Panthers | 82 | 24 | 36 | 13 | 9 | 176 | 237 | 70 |
| 5 | 15 | Carolina Hurricanes | 82 | 22 | 43 | 11 | 6 | 171 | 240 | 61 |

Eastern Conference
| R | | Div | GP | W | L | T | OTL | GF | GA | Pts |
|---|---|---|---|---|---|---|---|---|---|---|
| **1** | **P-** Ottawa Senators | **NE** | **82** | **52** | **21** | **8** | **1** | **263** | **182** | 113 |
| **2** | **Y-** New Jersey Devils | **AT** | **82** | **46** | **20** | **10** | **6** | **216** | **166** | 108 |
| **3** | **Y-** Tampa Bay Lightning | **SE** | **82** | **36** | **25** | **16** | **5** | **219** | **210** | 93 |
| **4** | **X-** Philadelphia Flyers | **AT** | **82** | **45** | **20** | **13** | **4** | **211** | **166** | 107 |
| **5** | **X-** Toronto Maple Leafs | **NE** | **82** | **44** | **28** | **7** | **3** | **236** | **208** | 98 |
| **6** | **X-** Washington Capitals | **SE** | **82** | **39** | **29** | **8** | **6** | **224** | **220** | 92 |
| **7** | **X-** Boston Bruins | **NE** | **82** | **36** | **31** | **11** | **4** | **245** | **237** | 87 |
| **8** | **X-** New York Islanders | **AT** | **82** | **35** | **34** | **11** | **2** | **224** | **231** | 83 |
8.5
| 9 | New York Rangers | AT | 82 | 32 | 36 | 10 | 4 | 210 | 231 | 78 |
| 10 | Montreal Canadiens | NE | 82 | 30 | 35 | 8 | 9 | 206 | 234 | 77 |
| 11 | Atlanta Thrashers | SE | 82 | 31 | 39 | 7 | 5 | 226 | 284 | 74 |
| 12 | Buffalo Sabres | NE | 82 | 27 | 37 | 10 | 8 | 190 | 219 | 72 |
| 13 | Florida Panthers | SE | 82 | 24 | 36 | 13 | 9 | 176 | 237 | 70 |
| 14 | Pittsburgh Penguins | AT | 82 | 27 | 44 | 6 | 5 | 189 | 255 | 65 |
| 15 | Carolina Hurricanes | SE | 82 | 22 | 43 | 11 | 6 | 171 | 240 | 61 |

Divisions: AT – Atlantic, NE – Northeast, SE – Southeast

P – Clinched Presidents Trophy; Y – Clinched division; X – Clinched playoff spot

=== Western Conference ===
Central Division
| No. | CR | | GP | W | L | T | OTL | GF | GA | Pts |
|---|---|---|---|---|---|---|---|---|---|---|
| 1 | 2 | **Detroit Red Wings** | 82 | 48 | 20 | 10 | 4 | 269 | 203 | 110 |
| 2 | 5 | **St. Louis Blues** | 82 | 41 | 24 | 11 | 6 | 253 | 222 | 99 |
| 3 | 9 | Chicago Blackhawks | 82 | 30 | 33 | 13 | 6 | 207 | 226 | 79 |
| 4 | 13 | Nashville Predators | 82 | 27 | 35 | 13 | 7 | 183 | 206 | 74 |
| 5 | 15 | Columbus Blue Jackets | 82 | 29 | 42 | 8 | 3 | 213 | 263 | 69 |

Northwest Division
| No. | CR | | GP | W | L | T | OTL | GF | GA | Pts |
|---|---|---|---|---|---|---|---|---|---|---|
| 1 | 3 | **Colorado Avalanche** | 82 | 42 | 19 | 13 | 8 | 251 | 194 | 105 |
| 2 | 4 | **Vancouver Canucks** | 82 | 45 | 23 | 13 | 1 | 264 | 208 | 104 |
| 3 | 6 | **Minnesota Wild** | 82 | 42 | 29 | 10 | 1 | 198 | 178 | 95 |
| 4 | 8 | **Edmonton Oilers** | 82 | 36 | 26 | 11 | 9 | 231 | 230 | 92 |
| 5 | 12 | Calgary Flames | 82 | 29 | 36 | 13 | 4 | 186 | 228 | 75 |

Pacific Division
| No. | CR | | GP | W | L | T | OTL | GF | GA | Pts |
|---|---|---|---|---|---|---|---|---|---|---|
| 1 | 1 | **Dallas Stars** | 82 | 46 | 17 | 15 | 4 | 245 | 169 | 111 |
| 2 | 7 | **Mighty Ducks of Anaheim** | 82 | 40 | 27 | 9 | 6 | 203 | 193 | 95 |
| 3 | 10 | Los Angeles Kings | 82 | 33 | 37 | 6 | 6 | 203 | 221 | 78 |
| 4 | 11 | Phoenix Coyotes | 82 | 31 | 35 | 11 | 5 | 204 | 230 | 78 |
| 5 | 14 | San Jose Sharks | 82 | 28 | 37 | 9 | 8 | 214 | 239 | 73 |

Note: CR = Conference rank; GP = Games played; W = Wins; L = Losses; T = Ties; OTL = Overtime loss; GF = Goals for; GA = Goals against; Pts = Points
Bolded teams qualified for the playoffs.

Western Conference
| R | | Div | GP | W | L | T | OTL | GF | GA | Pts |
|---|---|---|---|---|---|---|---|---|---|---|
| **1** | **Z-** Dallas Stars | **PA** | **82** | **46** | **17** | **15** | **4** | **245** | **169** | 111 |
| **2** | **Y-** Detroit Red Wings | **CE** | **82** | **48** | **20** | **10** | **4** | **269** | **203** | 110 |
| **3** | **Y-** Colorado Avalanche | **NW** | **82** | **42** | **19** | **13** | **8** | **251** | **194** | 105 |
| **4** | **X-** Vancouver Canucks | **NW** | **82** | **45** | **23** | **13** | **1** | **264** | **208** | 104 |
| **5** | **X-** St. Louis Blues | **CE** | **82** | **41** | **24** | **11** | **6** | **253** | **222** | 99 |
| **6** | **X-** Minnesota Wild | **NW** | **82** | **42** | **29** | **10** | **1** | **198** | **178** | 95 |
| **7** | **X-** Mighty Ducks of Anaheim | **PA** | **82** | **40** | **27** | **9** | **6** | **203** | **193** | 95 |
| **8** | **X-** Edmonton Oilers | **NW** | **82** | **36** | **26** | **11** | **9** | **231** | **230** | 92 |
8.5
| 9 | Chicago Blackhawks | CE | 82 | 30 | 33 | 13 | 6 | 207 | 226 | 79 |
| 10 | Los Angeles Kings | PA | 82 | 33 | 37 | 6 | 6 | 203 | 221 | 78 |
| 11 | Phoenix Coyotes | PA | 82 | 31 | 35 | 11 | 5 | 204 | 230 | 78 |
| 12 | Calgary Flames | NW | 82 | 29 | 36 | 13 | 4 | 186 | 228 | 75 |
| 13 | Nashville Predators | CE | 82 | 27 | 35 | 13 | 7 | 183 | 206 | 74 |
| 14 | San Jose Sharks | PA | 82 | 28 | 37 | 9 | 8 | 214 | 239 | 73 |
| 15 | Columbus Blue Jackets | CE | 82 | 29 | 42 | 8 | 3 | 213 | 263 | 69 |

Divisions: PA – Pacific, CE – Central, NW – Northwest

Z – Clinched conference; Y – Clinched division; X – Clinched playoff spot Source: McCarthy, Dave, ed. (2009). NHL Official Guide and Record Book 2009. NHL. p. 156.

== Playoffs ==
2003 Stanley Cup playoffs logo

=== Bracket ===
In each round, teams competed in a best-of-seven series following a 2–2–1–1–1 format (scores in the bracket indicate the number of games won in each best-of-seven series). The team with home ice advantage played at home for games one and two (and games five and seven, if necessary), and the other team played at home for games three and four (and game six, if necessary). The top eight teams in each conference made the playoffs, with the three division winners seeded 1–3 based on regular season record, and the five remaining teams seeded 4–8.

The NHL used "re-seeding" instead of a fixed bracket playoff system. During the first three rounds, the highest remaining seed in each conference was matched against the lowest remaining seed, the second-highest remaining seed played the second-lowest remaining seed, and so forth. The higher-seeded team was awarded home ice advantage. The two conference winners then advanced to the Stanley Cup Finals, where home ice advantage was awarded to the team that had the better regular season record.

Conference quarterfinals | Conference semifinals
1 | Ottawa | 4
8 | NY Islanders | 1
1 | Ottawa | 4
4 | Philadelphia | 2
2 | New Jersey | 4
7 | Boston | 1
Eastern Conference
3 | Tampa Bay | 4
6 | Washington | 2
2 | New Jersey | 4
3 | Tampa Bay | 1
4 | Philadelphia | 4
5 | Toronto | 3
1 | Dallas | 4
8 | Edmonton | 2
1 | Dallas | 2
7 | Anaheim | 4
2 | Detroit | 0
7 | Anaheim | 4
Western Conference
3 | Colorado | 3
6 | Minnesota | 4
4 | Vancouver | 3
6 | Minnesota | 4
4 | Vancouver | 4
5 | St. Louis | 3

Conference finals
1 | Ottawa | 3
2 | New Jersey | 4
7 | Anaheim | 4
6 | Minnesota | 0

Stanley Cup Finals
E2 | New Jersey | 4
W7 | Anaheim | 3

== Awards ==
The NHL Awards presentation took place in Toronto.

| Presidents' Trophy: | Ottawa Senators |
| Prince of Wales Trophy: (Eastern Conference playoff champion) | New Jersey Devils |
| Clarence S. Campbell Bowl: (Western Conference playoff champion) | Mighty Ducks of Anaheim |
| Art Ross Trophy: | Peter Forsberg, Colorado Avalanche |
| Bill Masterton Memorial Trophy: | Steve Yzerman, Detroit Red Wings |
| Calder Memorial Trophy: | Barret Jackman, St. Louis Blues |
| Conn Smythe Trophy: | Jean-Sebastien Giguere, Mighty Ducks of Anaheim |
| Frank J. Selke Trophy: | Jere Lehtinen, Dallas Stars |
| Hart Memorial Trophy: | Peter Forsberg, Colorado Avalanche |
| Jack Adams Award: | Jacques Lemaire, Minnesota Wild |
| James Norris Memorial Trophy: | Nicklas Lidstrom, Detroit Red Wings |
| King Clancy Memorial Trophy: | Brendan Shanahan, Detroit Red Wings |
| Lady Byng Memorial Trophy: | Alexander Mogilny, Toronto Maple Leafs |
| Lester B. Pearson Award: | Markus Naslund, Vancouver Canucks |
| Maurice 'Rocket' Richard Trophy: | Milan Hejduk, Colorado Avalanche |
| NHL Foundation Player Award: | Darren McCarty, Detroit Red Wings |
| NHL Plus-Minus Award: | Peter Forsberg & Milan Hejduk, Colorado Avalanche |
| Roger Crozier Saving Grace Award: | Marty Turco, Dallas Stars |
| Vezina Trophy: | Martin Brodeur, New Jersey Devils |
| William M. Jennings Trophy: | Martin Brodeur, New Jersey Devils; Roman Cechmanek and Robert Esche, Philadelphia Flyers |

=== All-Star teams ===
| First team | Position | Second team |
|---|---|---|
| Martin Brodeur, New Jersey Devils | G | Marty Turco, Dallas Stars |
| Al MacInnis, St. Louis Blues | D | Sergei Gonchar, Washington Capitals |
| Nicklas Lidstrom, Detroit Red Wings | D | Derian Hatcher, Dallas Stars |
| Peter Forsberg, Colorado Avalanche | C | Joe Thornton, Boston Bruins |
| Todd Bertuzzi, Vancouver Canucks | RW | Milan Hejduk, Colorado Avalanche |
| Markus Naslund, Vancouver Canucks | LW | Paul Kariya, Mighty Ducks of Anaheim |

== Player statistics ==
=== Regular season ===
==== Scoring leaders ====
Note: GP = Games Played, G = Goals, A = Assists, Pts = Points

| Player | Team | GP | G | A | Pts |
|---|---|---|---|---|---|
| Peter Forsberg | Colorado | 75 | 29 | 77 | 106 |
| Markus Naslund | Vancouver | 82 | 48 | 56 | 104 |
| Joe Thornton | Boston | 77 | 36 | 65 | 101 |
| Milan Hejduk | Colorado | 82 | 50 | 48 | 98 |
| Todd Bertuzzi | Vancouver | 82 | 46 | 51 | 97 |
| Pavol Demitra | St. Louis | 78 | 36 | 57 | 93 |
| Glen Murray | Boston | 82 | 44 | 48 | 92 |
| Mario Lemieux | Pittsburgh | 67 | 28 | 63 | 91 |
| Dany Heatley | Atlanta | 77 | 41 | 48 | 89 |
| Zigmund Palffy | Los Angeles | 76 | 37 | 48 | 85 |
| Mike Modano | Dallas | 79 | 28 | 57 | 85 |
| Sergei Fedorov | Detroit | 80 | 36 | 47 | 83 |

Source: NHL.

==== Leading goaltenders ====
Note: GP = Games played; Min = Minutes played; GA = Goals against; GAA = Goals against average; W = Wins; L = Losses; T = Ties; SO = Shutouts; SV% = Save percentage

| Player | Team | GP | MIN | GA | GAA | W | L | T | SO | SV% |
|---|---|---|---|---|---|---|---|---|---|---|
| Marty Turco | Dallas Stars | 55 | 3203 | 92 | 1.72 | 31 | 10 | 10 | 7 | .932 |
| Roman Cechmanek | Philadelphia Flyers | 58 | 3350 | 102 | 1.83 | 33 | 15 | 10 | 6 | .925 |
| Dwayne Roloson | Minnesota Wild | 50 | 2945 | 98 | 2.00 | 23 | 16 | 8 | 4 | .927 |
| Martin Brodeur | New Jersey Devils | 73 | 4374 | 147 | 2.02 | 41 | 23 | 9 | 9 | .914 |
| Patrick Lalime | Ottawa Senators | 67 | 3943 | 142 | 2.16 | 39 | 20 | 7 | 8 | .911 |
| Patrick Roy | Colorado Avalanche | 63 | 3769 | 137 | 2.18 | 35 | 15 | 13 | 5 | .920 |
| Tomas Vokoun | Nashville Predators | 69 | 3974 | 146 | 2.20 | 25 | 31 | 11 | 3 | .918 |
| Manny Fernandez | Minnesota Wild | 35 | 1979 | 75 | 2.24 | 19 | 13 | 2 | 2 | .924 |
| Ed Belfour | Toronto Maple Leafs | 62 | 3737 | 141 | 2.26 | 37 | 20 | 5 | 7 | .922 |
| Jean-Sebastien Giguere | Mighty Ducks of Anaheim | 65 | 3775 | 145 | 2.30 | 34 | 22 | 6 | 8 | .920 |

=== Playoffs ===
==== Scoring leaders ====
Note: GP = Games Played, G = Goals, A = Assists, Pts = Points

| Player | Team | GP | G | A | Pts |
|---|---|---|---|---|---|
| Jamie Langenbrunner | New Jersey Devils | 24 | 11 | 7 | 18 |
| Scott Niedermayer | New Jersey Devils | 24 | 2 | 16 | 18 |
| Marian Gaborik | Minnesota Wild | 18 | 9 | 8 | 17 |
| John Madden | New Jersey Devils | 24 | 6 | 10 | 16 |
| Marian Hossa | Ottawa Senators | 18 | 5 | 11 | 16 |
| Mike Modano | Dallas Stars | 12 | 5 | 10 | 15 |
| Jeff Friesen | New Jersey Devils | 24 | 10 | 4 | 14 |
| Markus Naslund | Vancouver Canucks | 14 | 5 | 9 | 14 |
| Sergei Zubov | Dallas Stars | 12 | 4 | 10 | 14 |
| Andrew Brunette | Minnesota Wild | 18 | 7 | 6 | 13 |
| Wes Walz | Minnesota Wild | 18 | 7 | 6 | 13 |

== Coaches ==
=== Eastern Conference ===
- Atlanta Thrashers: Curt Fraser, Don Waddell and Bob Hartley
- Boston Bruins: Robbie Ftorek and Mike O'Connell
- Buffalo Sabres: Lindy Ruff
- Carolina Hurricanes: Paul Maurice
- Florida Panthers: Mike Keenan
- Montreal Canadiens: Michel Therrien and Claude Julien
- New Jersey Devils: Pat Burns
- New York Islanders: Peter Laviolette
- New York Rangers: Bryan Trottier and Glen Sather
- Ottawa Senators: Jacques Martin
- Philadelphia Flyers: Ken Hitchcock
- Pittsburgh Penguins: Rick Kehoe
- Tampa Bay Lightning: John Tortorella
- Toronto Maple Leafs: Pat Quinn
- Washington Capitals: Bruce Cassidy

=== Western Conference ===
- Mighty Ducks of Anaheim: Mike Babcock
- Calgary Flames: Greg Gilbert, Al MacNeil and Darryl Sutter
- Chicago Blackhawks: Brian Sutter
- Colorado Avalanche: Bob Hartley and Tony Granato
- Columbus Blue Jackets: Dave King and Doug MacLean
- Dallas Stars: Dave Tippett
- Detroit Red Wings: Dave Lewis
- Edmonton Oilers: Craig MacTavish
- Los Angeles Kings: Andy Murray
- Minnesota Wild: Jacques Lemaire
- Nashville Predators: Barry Trotz
- Phoenix Coyotes: Bobby Francis
- San Jose Sharks: Darryl Sutter, Cap Raeder and Ron Wilson
- St. Louis Blues: Joel Quenneville
- Vancouver Canucks: Marc Crawford

== Milestones ==
=== Debuts ===
The following is a list of players of note who played their first NHL game in 2002–03 (listed with their first team):

- Patrick Sharp, Philadelphia Flyers
- Martin Gerber, Mighty Ducks of Anaheim
- Tim Thomas, Boston Bruins
- Ryan Miller, Buffalo Sabres
- Jordan Leopold, Calgary Flames
- Rick Nash, Columbus Blue Jackets
- Steve Ott, Dallas Stars
- Henrik Zetterberg, Detroit Red Wings
- Ales Hemsky, Edmonton Oilers
- Jarret Stoll, Edmonton Oilers
- Jay Bouwmeester, Florida Panthers
- Alexander Frolov, Los Angeles Kings
- Cristobal Huet, Los Angeles Kings
- Joe Corvo, Los Angeles Kings
- Mike Cammalleri, Los Angeles Kings
- Pierre-Marc Bouchard, Minnesota Wild
- Francois Beauchemin, Montreal Canadiens
- Anton Volchenkov, Ottawa Senators
- Jason Spezza, Ottawa Senators
- Ray Emery, Ottawa Senators
- Dennis Seidenberg, Philadelphia Flyers
- Jonathan Cheechoo, San Jose Sharks
- Matt Stajan, Toronto Maple Leafs

=== Last games ===
The following is a list of players of note who played their last NHL game in 2002–03, listed with their team:

| Player | Team | Notability |
|---|---|---|
| Tom Barrasso | St. Louis Blues | 3-time NHL All-Star, Calder Memorial Trophy winner, Vezina Trophy winner, William M. Jennings Trophy winner. |
| Craig Berube | Calgary Flames | Over 1000 games played. |
| Pavel Bure | New York Rangers | Olympic silver and bronze medalist, 7-time NHL All-Star, 2-time Maurice "Rocket" Richard Trophy winner, Calder Memorial Trophy winner. |
| Sylvain Cote | Washington Capitals | Over 1100 games played. |
| Ken Daneyko | New Jersey Devils | Bill Masterton Trophy winner, over 1200 games played. |
| Adam Deadmarsh | Los Angeles Kings | Olympic silver medalist. |
| Kevin Dineen | Columbus Blue Jackets | Over 1100 games played. |
| Theoren Fleury | Chicago Blackhawks | 7-time NHL All-Star, over 1000 games played. |
| Doug Gilmour | Toronto Maple Leafs | 2-time NHL All-Star, Frank J. Selke Trophy winner, over 1400 games played. |
| Adam Graves | San Jose Sharks | Bill Masterton Trophy winner, King Clancy Memorial Trophy winner, over 1100 games played. |
| Phil Housley | Toronto Maple Leafs | Olympic silver medalist, 7-time NHL All-Star, over 1400 games played. |
| Uwe Krupp | Atlanta Thrashers | 2-time NHL All-Star. |
| Kirk Muller | Dallas Stars | Over 1300 games played. |
| Shjon Podein | St. Louis Blues | King Clancy Memorial Trophy winner. |
| Paul Ranheim | Phoenix Coyotes | Over 1000 games played. |
| Mike Richter | New York Rangers | 2-time NHL All-Star. |
| Patrick Roy | Colorado Avalanche | 11-time NHL All-Star, 5-time William M. Jennings Trophy winner, 3-time Conn Smythe Trophy winner, 3-time Vezina Trophy winner, over 1000 games played. |

== 2003 trade deadline ==
Trading deadline: March 11, 2003. Here is a list of major trades for the 2002–03 NHL trade deadline:

- March 11, 2003: Anaheim traded D Mike Commodore and G Jean-Francois Damphousse to Calgary for C Rob Niedermayer.
- March 11, 2003: Chicago traded D Phil Housley to Toronto for Calgary's fourth-round pick in the 2003 Entry Draft (if acquired) or Toronto's ninth-round pick in 2003 and fourth-round pick in 2004.
- March 11, 2003 – Chicago Blackhawks trade Steve Thomas to Mighty Ducks of Anaheim for 2003 fifth round draft pick (Alexei Ivanov).
- March 11, 2003: Edmonton traded RW Anson Carter and D Ales Pisa to NY Rangers for RW Radek Dvorak and D Cory Cross.
- March 11, 2003: Edmonton traded D Janne Niinimaa and a conditional second-round pick in the 2003 Entry Draft to NY Islanders for LW Brad Isbister and LW Raffi Torres.
- March 11, 2003: Florida traded RW Valeri Bure and a conditional pick in the 2004 Entry Draft to St. Louis for D Mike Van Ryn.
- March 11, 2003: Los Angeles traded D Mathieu Schneider to Detroit for C Sean Avery, D Maxim Kuznetsov, Detroit's first-round pick in the 2003 Entry Draft and second-round pick in 2004.
- March 11, 2003: Los Angeles traded C Bryan Smolinski to Ottawa for the rights to D Tim Gleason and future considerations.
- March 11, 2003: Montreal traded C Doug Gilmour to Toronto for Toronto's sixth-round pick in the 2003 Entry Draft.
- March 11, 2003: NY Islanders traded G Chris Osgood and the Islanders' third-round pick in the 2003 Entry Draft to St. Louis for C Justin Papineau and St. Louis' second-round pick in the 2003 Entry Draft.

== Broadcasting ==
=== Canada ===
This was the first season of the league's Canadian national broadcast rights deals with CBC and TSN. CBC continued to air Saturday night Hockey Night in Canada regular season games, while TSN's coverage included Wednesday Night Hockey and other selected weeknights. Stanley Cup playoff coverage on cable expanded beyond the first round, with TSN allowed to televise all-U.S. games up to the Conference Finals. CBC still aired all playoff games involving Canadian teams, as well as exclusive coverage of the Stanley Cup Finals.

=== United States ===
This was the fourth year of the league's five-year U.S. national broadcast rights deal with ESPN and ABC. ESPN and ESPN2 aired weeknight games throughout the regular season. ABC's coverage included the All-Star Game and five weeks worth of regional games on Saturday afternoons between January and March. During the first two rounds of the playoffs, ESPN and ESPN2 aired selected games, while ABC had Saturday regional telecasts. Each U.S. team's regional broadcaster produced local coverage of first and second-round games (except for those games on ABC). ABC's weekend telecasts continued into the Conference Finals, while ESPN had the rest of the third-round games. ESPN then aired the first two games of the Stanley Cup Finals before the rest of the series shifted to ABC.

== See also ==
- List of Stanley Cup champions
- 2003 Stanley Cup playoffs
- 2002 NHL entry draft
- 2002–03 NHL transactions
- 53rd National Hockey League All-Star Game
- NHL All-Star Game
- NHL All-Rookie Team
- 2002 in sports
- 2003 in sports
