= Andrei Lozhkin =

Andrei Lozhkin may refer to:

- Andrei Lozhkin (footballer)
- Andrei Lozhkin (ice hockey)
