= Denis Loginov =

Russian ice hockey player (born 1985)

- Born: 5 May 1985 (age 41) Kazan, USSR
- Height: 6 ft 1 in (185 cm)
- Weight: 212 lb (96 kg; 15 st 2 lb)
- Position: Forward
- Shot: Left
- Played for: Ak Bars Kazan; HC Neftekhimik Nizhnekamsk
- NHL draft: 203rd overall, 2003; Atlanta Thrashers
- Playing career: 2003–2014

Denis Loginov (born 5 May 1985) is a Russian professional ice hockey forward.

He was selected by the Atlanta Thrashers in the 7th round (203rd overall) of the 2002 NHL entry draft but never signed a contract and remained in Russia. Loginov played in the Russian Superleague for Ak Bars Kazan and HC Neftekhimik Nizhnekamsk.

== Career statistics ==
=== Regular season and playoffs ===
			Regular season					Playoffs
Season	Team	League	GP	G	A	Pts	PIM	GP	G	A	Pts	PIM
1999–2000	Ak Bars–2 Kazan	RUS.3	4	0	0	0	0	—	—	—	—	—
2000–01	Ak Bars–2 Kazan	RUS.3	28	7	5	12	14	—	—	—	—	—
2001–02	Ak Bars–2 Kazan	RUS.3	43	6	10	16	40	—	—	—	—	—
2001–02	Lada–2 Togliatti	RUS.3	1	0	3	3	4	—	—	—	—	—
2002–03	Ak Bars–2 Kazan	RUS.3	52	16	21	37	116	—	—	—	—	—
2003–04	Ak Bars Kazan	RSL	16	2	1	3	0	7	1	0	1	6
2003–04	Ak Bars–2 Kazan	RUS.3	37	28	13	41	102	—	—	—	—	—
2004–05	Ak Bars Kazan	RSL	2	0	0	0	0	—	—	—	—	—
2004–05	Ak Bars–2 Kazan	RUS.3	10	10	9	19	40	—	—	—	—	—
2004–05	Neftyanik Almetievsk	RUS.2	24	4	7	11	56	7	2	0	2	8
2004–05	Neftyanik–2 Almetievsk	RUS.3	9	7	5	12	28	—	—	—	—	—
2005–06	Ak Bars Kazan	RSL	16	1	1	2	10	—	—	—	—	—
2005–06	Ak Bars–2 Kazan	RUS.3	10	10	7	17	32	—	—	—	—	—
2006–07	Ak Bars–2 Kazan	RUS.3	7	2	6	8	24	—	—	—	—	—
2006–07	Neftekhimik–2 Nizhnekamsk	RUS.3	8	8	6	14	22	—	—	—	—	—
2007–08	Neftekhimik Nizhnekamsk	RSL	6	0	0	0	0	—	—	—	—	—
2007–08	Neftekhimik–2 Nizhnekamsk	RUS.3	16	8	12	20	60	—	—	—	—	—
2007–08	Ariada–Akpars Volzhsk	RUS.2	10	2	3	5	14	—	—	—	—	—
2007–08	Gazprom–OGU Orenburg	RUS.2	12	3	3	6	30	—	—	—	—	—
2008–09	HC Rys	RUS.2	51	10	5	15	97	3	0	1	1	2
2009–10	Progress Glazov	RUS.2	27	7	11	18	56	—	—	—	—	—
2009–10	Neftyanik Almetievsk	RUS.2	20	7	9	16	24	13	3	6	9	41
2010–11	Ariada–Akpars Volzhsk	VHL	31	8	4	12	44	—	—	—	—	—
2010–11	Yertis Pavlodar	KAZ	9	2	3	5	16	13	3	2	5	20
2011–12	Yertis Pavlodar	KAZ	45	15	16	31	46	12	2	2	4	16
2012–13	Izhstal Izhevsk	VHL	1	0	0	0	0	—	—	—	—	—
2012–13	Neman Grodno	BLR	1	0	1	1	0	—	—	—	—	—
2012–13	Yertis Pavlodar	KAZ	36	7	8	15	40	1	0	0	0	0
2013–14	Yamalskiye Sterkhi Noyabrsk	RUS.3	22	13	17	30	32	—	—	—	—	—
RUS.3 totals			247	115	114	229	514	—	—	—	—	—
RSL totals			40	3	2	5	10	7	1	0	1	6
RUS.2 & VHL totals			183	42	42	84	329	23	5	7	12	51

=== International ===
Year	Team	Event	GP	G	A	Pts	PIM
2003	Russia	WJC18	6	1	0	1	4
Junior totals			6	1	0	1	4
