= Nikita Lozhkin =

Russian ice hockey player

- Born: October 13, 1991 (age 34) Perm, Russia
- Height: 6 ft 0 in (183 cm)
- Weight: 205 lb (93 kg; 14 st 9 lb)
- Position: Goaltender
- Catches: Left
- VHL team Former teams: Molot-Prikamie Perm; Metallurg Novokuznetsk
- NHL draft: Undrafted
- Playing career: 2011–present

Nikita Lozhkin (born October 13, 1991) is a Russian professional ice hockey goaltender. He is currently playing with Molot-Prikamie Perm of the Higher Hockey League (VHL).

Lozhkin made his Kontinental Hockey League debut playing with Metallurg Novokuznetsk during the 2013–14 KHL season.
