= Matěj Trojovský =

Czech ice hockey player (born 1984)

- Born: October 12, 1984 (age 41) Plzeň, Czechoslovakia
- Height: 6 ft 5 in (196 cm)
- Weight: 231 lb (105 kg; 16 st 7 lb)
- Position: Defence
- Shot: Left
- Played for: HC Plzeň
- NHL draft: 130th overall, 2003; Carolina Hurricanes
- Playing career: 2005–2008

Matej Trojovsky (born October 12, 1984) is a Czech former professional ice hockey defenceman. He played in the Czech Extraliga for HC Plzeň. He was drafted 130th overall by the Carolina Hurricanes in the 2003 NHL entry draft.

== Career statistics ==
			Regular season					Playoffs
Season	Team	League	GP	G	A	Pts	PIM	GP	G	A	Pts	PIM
1999–2000	HC Keramika Plzeň	CZE U18	36	2	13	15	58	5	0	1	1	2
2000–01	Lincoln Stars	USHL	17	1	0	1	178	—	—	—	—	—
2001–02	Regina Pats	WHL	67	3	10	13	154	6	0	1	1	18
2002–03	Regina Pats	WHL	70	3	6	9	229	5	0	0	0	6
2003–04	Swift Current Broncos	WHL	51	3	6	9	201	3	0	0	0	10
2004–05	Swift Current Broncos	WHL	30	3	3	6	119	—	—	—	—	—
2004–05	Prince George Cougars	WHL	27	2	1	3	80	—	—	—	—	—
2005–06	HC Lasselsberger Plzeň	ELH	13	0	0	0	22	—	—	—	—	—
2005–06	HC Berounští Medvědi	CZE.2	19	3	2	5	69	—	—	—	—	—
2006–07	HC Lasselsberger Plzeň	ELH	1	0	0	0	0	—	—	—	—	—
2006–07	SK Kadaň	CZE.2	8	2	0	2	16	—	—	—	—	—
2007–08	HC Berounští Medvědi	CZE.2	6	0	1	1	6	—	—	—	—	—
ELH totals			14	0	0	0	22	—	—	—	—	—
CZE.2 totals			33	5	3	8	91	—	—	—	—	—
