= Andrei Lozhkin (ice hockey) =

Russian ice hockey centre

- Born: January 2, 1985 (age 40); Kirovo-Chepetsk, Russian SFSR, Soviet Union
- Height: 5 ft 10 in (178 cm)
- Weight: 187 lb (85 kg; 13 st 5 lb)
- Position: Centre
- Shot: Left
- Played for: Torpedo Nizhny Novgorod; Olimpiya Kirovo-Chepetsk; Dynamo Moscow; Gazprom-OGU Orenburg; Gazovik Tyumen; HC Ryazan; Ariada-Akpars Volzhsk; HC Kuban; Yuzhny Ural Orsk
- Playing career: 2002–2016

Andrei Lozhkin (born January 2, 1985) is a Russian retired ice hockey centre.

== Career ==
Lozhkin played twenty games in the Russian Superleague and three games in the Kontinental Hockey League for Dynamo Moscow. He spent the majority of his career in Russia's second-tier leagues the Vysshaya Liga and the Supreme Hockey League. He played for Torpedo Nizhny Novgorod and Olimpiya Kirovo-Chepetsk of the Vysshaya Liga before playing for Dynamo Moscow.

He also played for Gazprom-OGU Orenburg, Rubin Tyumen, HC Ryazan, Ariada Volzhsk and HC Kuban before finishing his career with Yuzhny Ural Orsk.

== Career statistics ==
			Regular season					Playoffs
Season	Team	League	GP	G	A	Pts	PIM	GP	G	A	Pts	PIM
2000–01	Torpedo Nizhny Novgorod-2	Russia3	3	1	1	2	2	—	—	—	—	—
2001–02	Torpedo Nizhny Novgorod-2	Russia3	18	3	5	8	14	—	—	—	—	—
2002–03	Torpedo Nizhny Novgorod	Russia2	1	0	0	0	0	1	0	0	0	0
2002–03	Torpedo Nizhny Novgorod-2	Russia3	30	6	9	15	53	—	—	—	—	—
2003–04	Torpedo Nizhny Novgorod-2	Russia3	53	16	5	21	122	—	—	—	—	—
2004–05	Olimpiya Kirovo-Chepetsk	Russia2	51	10	2	12	92	—	—	—	—	—
2004–05	Olimpiya Kirovo-Chepetsk-2	Russia3	2	1	0	1	2	—	—	—	—	—
2005–06	Olimpiya Kirovo-Chepetsk	Russia2	48	2	8	10	56	—	—	—	—	—
2005–06	Olimpiya Kirovo-Chepetsk-2	Russia3	1	0	0	0	0	—	—	—	—	—
2006–07	Olimpiya Kirovo-Chepetsk	Russia2	48	13	8	21	58	—	—	—	—	—
2007–08	Olimpiya Kirovo-Chepetsk	Russia3	25	13	12	25	26	—	—	—	—	—
2007–08	HC Dynamo Moscow	Russia	18	0	1	1	8	2	0	0	0	0
2007–08	HC Dynamo Moscow-2	Russia3	8	6	5	11	26	—	—	—	—	—
2008–09	HC Dynamo Moscow	KHL	3	0	0	0	2	—	—	—	—	—
2008–09	HC Dynamo Moscow-2	Russia3	5	3	2	5	8	—	—	—	—	—
2008–09	Gazprom-OGU Orenburg	Russia2	14	5	9	14	14	—	—	—	—	—
2008–09	Gazovik Tyumen	Russia2	30	8	4	12	14	8	1	3	4	10
2009–10	HC Ryazan	Russia2	54	16	16	32	38	8	4	3	7	10
2010–11	HC Ryazan	VHL	40	7	18	25	32	3	0	0	0	4
2011–12	Ariada-Akpars Volzhsk	VHL	43	12	11	23	38	5	0	0	0	4
2012–13	Ariada-Akpars Volzhsk	VHL	36	6	11	17	26	10	2	2	4	8
2013–14	Ariada Volzhsk	VHL	44	7	9	16	4	1	0	0	0	2
2014–15	Ariada Volzhsk	VHL	24	0	2	2	18	—	—	—	—	—
2014–15	HC Kuban	VHL	20	2	3	5	8	7	2	1	3	6
2015–16	Yuzhny Ural Orsk	VHL	25	3	4	7	10	—	—	—	—	—
KHL totals			3	0	0	0	2	—	—	—	—	—
Russia totals			18	0	1	1	8	2	0	0	0	0
Russia2 totals			246	54	47	101	272	17	5	6	11	20
Russia3 totals			145	49	39	88	253	—	—	—	—	—
VHL totals			232	37	58	95	136	26	4	3	7	24
