= Alisa Lozhkina =

Artist, art historian, curator, critic, and writer

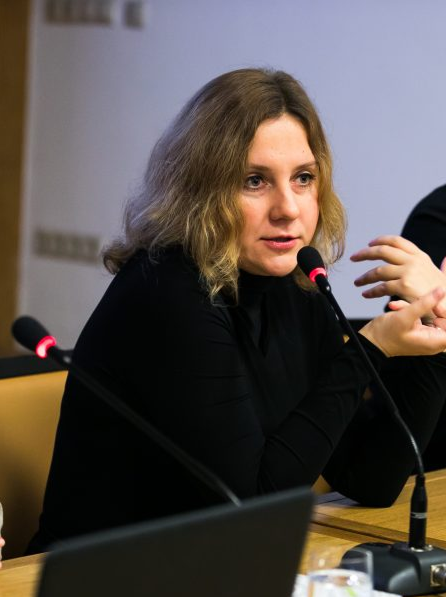
- Born: July 24, 1981 (age 44); Kyiv, Ukraine
- Occupations: Artist, Art historian, curator, art critic, writer
- Notable work: The Art of Ukraine (Thames & Hudson, 2024)
- Website: alisalozhkina.com

Alisa Lozhkina (Ukrainian: Ложкіна Аліса В’ячеславівна) is a California-based artist, art historian, curator, critic, and writer, known for her research on modern and contemporary art. She is the author of The Art of Ukraine, published in the World of Art series by Thames & Hudson in 2024.

== Biography ==
Lozhkina was born on 24 July 1981 in Kyiv, Ukraine. She graduated from the National University of Kyiv-Mohyla Academy in 2008, and then studied in Moscow in 2012-2013. She began her career as an art critic and curator in Ukraine. Lozhkina was editor‑in‑chief of the magazine Art Ukraine from 2010 to 2016. She was a deputy director and chief curator at Mystetskyi Arsenal from 2013 to 2017 as well.

Lozhkina is also a practising artist aside from curatorial and scholarly works. Her website presents a body of work that includes digital art, painting, textile sculptures, and mixed-media projects.

== Work ==
=== Artistic and curatorial activity ===
Lozhkina has curated and co-curated major exhibitions promoting Ukrainian art internationally, including: Permanent Revolution: Ukrainian Art Now at Ludwig Museum, Budapest (2018), Between Fire and Fire: Contemporary Art from Ukraine at Semperdepot / Academy of Fine Arts, Vienna (2019–2020).

Lozhkina played a key role as part of the curatorial team behind the Pompidou Centre's contemporary Ukrainian art initiative, "Ukraine: Contemporary Donation", described as an international effort involving Ukrainian curators, including Lozhkina, Solovyev, and Barshynova. She also participated in a related round table at the Kandinsky Library moderated by curators from the Centre Pompidou.

In 2022, Lozhkina debuted her exhibition Beast of War/Bird of Hope—a curatorial response to Russia's invasion of Ukraine—at the Aspen Institute in Colorado. The show traveled the following year to Washington, D.C., where it was presented at the John F. Kennedy Center for the Performing Arts.

Other notable projects include I Am a Drop in the Ocean: Art of the Ukrainian Revolution and Long Path to Freedom. In 2023 she presented Ukrainian contemporary art at Beaux-Arts de Paris during Week-end de l'Est.

=== Other ===
Her book The Art of Ukraine was released in 2024 by Thames & Hudson as part of the World of Art series, covering the history of Ukrainian art from the early 20th century to the present.

She also wrote Permanent Revolution: Art in Ukraine, XX to early XXI century, first published in Ukrainian by ArtHuss and later translated into French, with presentations at the Centre Pompidou in Paris.

Lozhkina is also the author of a Ukrainian translation of the ancient Indian poem Devi Mahatmya (The Glory of the Goddess), providing translation, commentary, and illustrations for the edition. The design concept for the publication was created by designer Anna K.

Her April 2022 essay in Texte zur Kunst, "We Are Only Seen When We Die", explores art in wartime and positions Lozhkina as both critic and creator.

In Artnet, her curatorship of "I Am a Drop in the Ocean" at Künstlerhaus Wien is discussed, emphasizing her close engagement with artists active during the Maidan uprising.

Lozhkina has lectured extensively at major academic and cultural institutions including Harvard, Yale, Columbia, MoMA, and others, discussing Ukrainian art, decolonial identity, and cultural resistance.

She published "A Suitcase, a Candle, and a Hammer: Ukrainian Artists Face the Russian Invasion" in the Los Angeles Review of Books, reflecting on the artistic responses to conflict in Ukraine.

== Books ==
- The Art of Ukraine (World of Art series). London – New York: Thames & Hudson, 2024.
- Devi Māhātmya: Greatness of the Goddess. Sanskrit text translated, illustrated, and annotated by Alisa Lozhkina. Kyiv: Ruslan Khalikov Publishing House, 2024.
- Une révolution permanente, 1880–2020: l’art ukrainien contemporain et ses racines. Paris: Nouvelles Éditions Place, 2020.
- Permanent Revolution: Art in Ukraine from the 20th to the Early 21st Century. Kyiv: ArtHuss, 2021.
- Space Within: Naïve and Outsider Art in Ukraine and the World. Edited by Alisa Lozhkina. Kyiv: ArtBook, 2020.
- Art Work Reader. Edited by Alisa Lozhkina. Kyiv: Mystetskyi Arsenal Publishing, 2018.
