= Evgeny Isakov =

Russian ice hockey player

- Born: October 13, 1984 (age 41) Krasnoyarsk, Russia
- Height: 6 ft 1 in (185 cm)
- Weight: 196 lb (89 kg; 14 st 0 lb)
- Position: Forward
- Shot: Left
- Played for: Severstal Cherepovets
- NHL draft: 161st overall, 2003; Pittsburgh Penguins
- Playing career: 2001–2014

Evgeny Isakov, sometimes shown as Evgeni Isakov, (born October 13, 1984) is a Russian former professional ice hockey forward who played for Severstal Cherepovets of the RSL from 2002 to 2004. Isakov played for Gazovik in Russia from 2004 to 2007. He was selected by Pittsburgh Penguins 161st overall in the 2003 NHL entry draft.

== Career statistics ==
=== Regular season and playoffs ===
			Regular season					Playoffs
Season	Team	League	GP	G	A	Pts	PIM	GP	G	A	Pts	PIM
1999–2000	Gazovik–2 Tyumen	RUS.3	7	0	2	2	16	—	—	—	—	—
2000–01	Gazovik–2 Tyumen	RUS.3	3	0	0	0	0	—	—	—	—	—
2000–01	Gazovik Tyumen	RUS.3	11	1	1	2	12	—	—	—	—	—
2001–02	Gazovik Tyumen	RUS.2	19	2	2	4	2	—	—	—	—	—
2001–02	Gazovik Univer	RUS.3	7	2	5	7	4	—	—	—	—	—
2001–02	Elemash Elektrostal	RUS.2	29	2	2	4	24	—	—	—	—	—
2001–02	Elemash–2 Elektrostal	RUS.3	11	3	3	6	43	—	—	—	—	—
2002–03	Severstal Cherepovets	RSL	36	0	3	3	12	1	0	0	0	0
2002–03	Severstal–2 Cherepovets	RUS.3	9	8	1	9	6	—	—	—	—	—
2003–04	Severstal Cherepovets	RSL	37	3	1	4	18	—	—	—	—	—
2003–04	Severstal–2 Cherepovets	RUS.3	14	4	8	12	58	—	—	—	—	—
2004–05	Severstal–2 Cherepovets	RUS.3	27	6	6	12	54	—	—	—	—	—
2004–05	Kristall Saratov	RUS.2	1	0	0	0	0	—	—	—	—	—
2004–05	Gazovik Tyumen	RUS.2	4	0	2	2	2	3	0	0	0	2
2004–05	Gazovik Univer	RUS.3	3	1	3	4	18	—	—	—	—	—
2005–06	Gazovik Tyumen	RUS.2	46	9	12	21	90	3	0	0	0	6
2006–07	Gazovik Tyumen	RUS.2	51	6	11	17	48	—	—	—	—	—
2006–07	Gazovik Univer	RUS.3	2	1	2	3	0	—	—	—	—	—
2007–08	Gazovik Tyumen	RUS.2	43	10	11	21	119	—	—	—	—	—
2008–09	Gazovik–2 Tyumen	RUS.3	1	0	0	0	0	—	—	—	—	—
2008–09	HC Yugra	RUS.2	18	1	4	5	12	—	—	—	—	—
2008–09	Metallurg Serov	RUS.2	33	11	18	29	40	3	1	0	1	22
2009–10	Dizel Penza	RUS.2	53	11	21	32	104	12	4	2	6	12
2010–11	Saryarka Karagandy	KAZ	45	14	22	36	32	14	1	2	3	16
2011–12	Saryarka Karagandy	KAZ	48	10	24	34	101	12	4	9	13	8
2012–13	Sokol Krasnoyarsk	VHL	10	3	3	6	12	—	—	—	—	—
2013–14	Sokol Krasnoyarsk	VHL	33	3	2	5	20	3	0	0	0	12
RUS.2 & VHL totals			340	58	88	146	473	24	5	2	7	54
RSL totals			73	3	4	7	30	1	0	0	0	0

=== International ===
Year	Team	Event	GP	G	A	Pts	PIM
2001	Russia	U18	5	4	1	5	4
2001	Russia	U17	5	0	1	1	4
2002	Russia	WJC18	8	4	0	4	2
Junior totals			18	8	2	10	10
