= Pauli Levokari =

Finnish ice hockey player (born 1978)

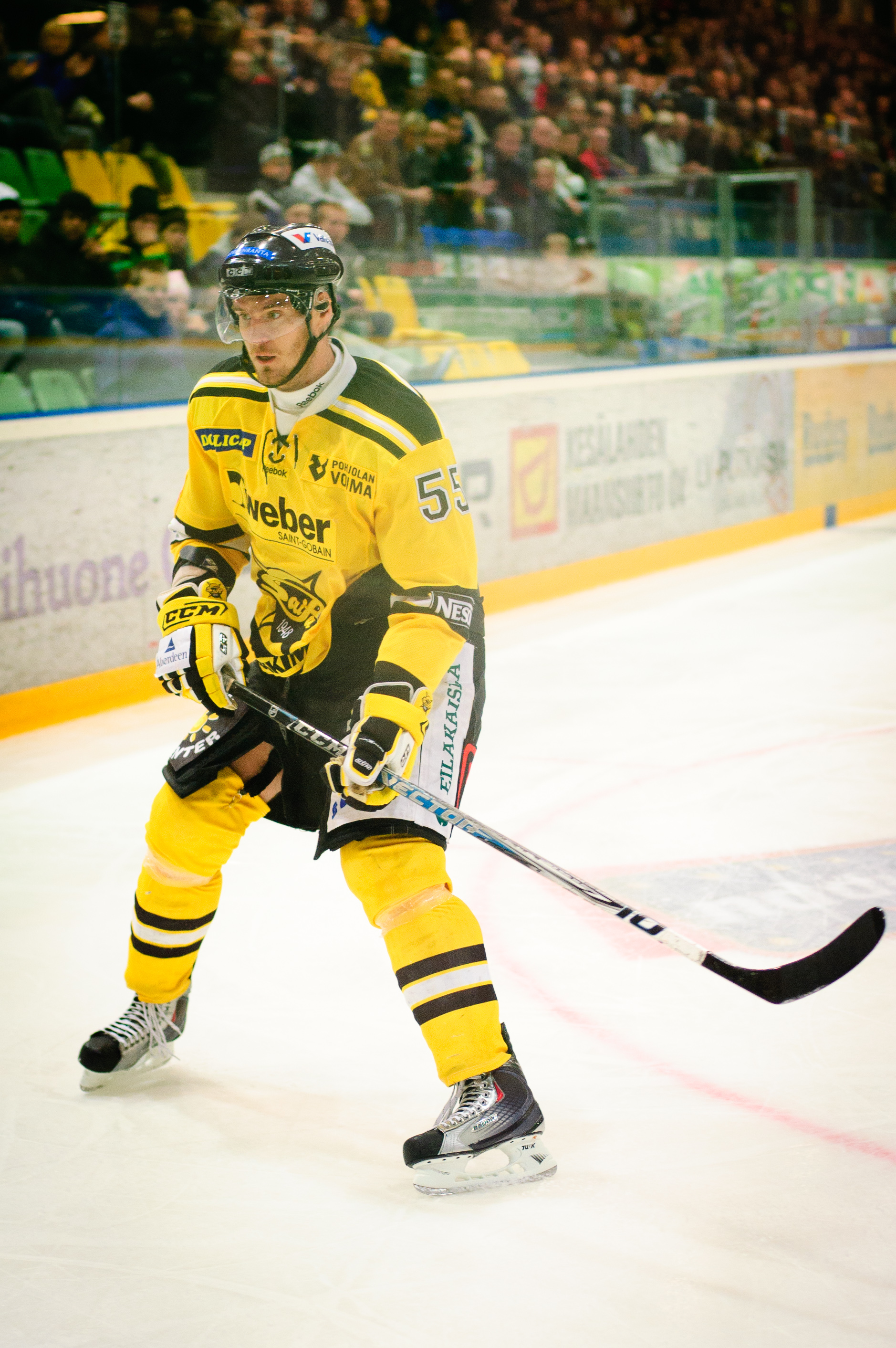
- Born: 7 April 1978 (age 48) Luvia, Finland
- Height: 6 ft 6 in (198 cm)
- Weight: 234 lb (106 kg; 16 st 10 lb)
- Position: Defence
- Shot: Left
- Played for: Ässät; Jokerit; HIFK; Syracuse Crunch; Wilkes-Barre/Scranton Penguins; Lukko; SaiPa; KalPa; Arystan Temirtau; SønderjyskE
- NHL draft: 257th overall, 2002; Atlanta Thrashers
- Playing career: 1996–2016

Pauli Levokari (born 7 April 1978) is a Finnish former professional ice hockey defenceman.

== Playing career ==
Levokari began his career at Ässät his hometown team where he played from 1996 to 2001. He then moved to Jokerit and then HIFK where he recorded then-career high stats of three goals and five assists for eight points in just 21 games.

He was drafted 257th overall by the Atlanta Thrashers in the 2002 NHL entry draft and signed with the organisation. He played six games for the AHL's Chicago Wolves and six games in the ECHL for the Greenville Grrrowl before being traded to the Columbus Blue Jackets with fellow Finn Tomi Kallio for another Finn Petteri Nummelin and Chris Nielsen. He spent the rest of the 2002–03 season with the Syracuse Crunch, playing 45 games and scoring four goals and six assists for ten points, his most productive to date. He continued to play for Syracuse until he was traded once more, moving to the Pittsburgh Penguins for fellow minor-league player Brendan Buckley. He finished the season with the Wilkes-Barre/Scranton Penguins and had a short playoff run with the team before returning to Finland.

In 2004, he returned to Ässät for one season before moving to Lukko. In 2006, he signed for SaiPa.

On May 5, 2014, Levokari extended his cameo with KooKoo at the end of the 2013-14 season, in signing an additional one-year contract.

== Career statistics ==
| | | | Regular season | | | | | Playoffs |
| Season | Team | League | GP | G | A | Pts | PIM | GP | G | A | Pts | PIM |
|---|---|---|---|---|---|---|---|---|---|---|---|---|
| 1994–95 | Ässät | FIN.2 U18 |
| 1995–96 | Ässät | FIN U18 | 28 | 5 | 6 | 11 | 42 | — | — | — | — | — |
| 1996–97 | Ässät | FIN U20 | 35 | 3 | 8 | 11 | 78 | — | — | — | — | — |
| 1996–97 | Ässät | SM-liiga | 1 | 0 | 0 | 0 | 0 | — | — | — | — | — |
| 1997–98 | Ässät | FIN U20 | 27 | 2 | 5 | 7 | 79 | — | — | — | — | — |
| 1997–98 | Ässät | SM-liiga | 16 | 0 | 0 | 0 | 0 | 1 | 0 | 0 | 0 | 0 |
| 1998–99 | Ässät | FIN U20 | 19 | 4 | 3 | 7 | 68 | — | — | — | — | — |
| 1998–99 | Ässät | SM-liiga | 27 | 0 | 2 | 2 | 8 | — | — | — | — | — |
| 1999–2000 | Ässät | SM-liiga | 51 | 3 | 2 | 5 | 80 | — | — | — | — | — |
| 2000–01 | Ässät | SM-liiga | 12 | 1 | 0 | 1 | 12 | — | — | — | — | — |
| 2000–01 | Jokerit | SM-liiga | 10 | 0 | 0 | 0 | 6 | — | — | — | — | — |
| 2000–01 | Kiekko–Vantaa | Mestis | 22 | 3 | 6 | 9 | 68 | 3 | 0 | 1 | 1 | 6 |
| 2001–02 | HIFK | SM-liiga | 29 | 3 | 5 | 8 | 86 | — | — | — | — | — |
| 2002–03 | Chicago Wolves | AHL | 6 | 0 | 1 | 1 | 12 | — | — | — | — | — |
| 2002–03 | Syracuse Crunch | AHL | 45 | 4 | 6 | 10 | 88 | — | — | — | — | — |
| 2002–03 | Greenville Grrrowl | ECHL | 4 | 0 | 0 | 0 | 8 | — | — | — | — | — |
| 2003–04 | Syracuse Crunch | AHL | 28 | 0 | 3 | 3 | 49 | — | — | — | — | — |
| 2003–04 | Wilkes–Barre/Scranton Penguins | AHL | 27 | 3 | 4 | 7 | 54 | 3 | 0 | 0 | 0 | 2 |
| 2004–05 | Ässät | SM-liiga | 49 | 2 | 2 | 4 | 181 | 2 | 0 | 0 | 0 | 6 |
| 2005–06 | Lukko | SM-liiga | 36 | 1 | 3 | 4 | 106 | — | — | — | — | — |
| 2006–07 | SaiPa | SM-liiga | 29 | 3 | 1 | 4 | 115 | — | — | — | — | — |
| 2006–07 | KooKoo | Mestis | 1 | 1 | 0 | 1 | 4 | — | — | — | — | — |
| 2007–08 | SaiPa | SM-liiga | 48 | 1 | 7 | 8 | 137 | — | — | — | — | — |
| 2008–09 | SaiPa | SM-liiga | 32 | 2 | 4 | 6 | 68 | — | — | — | — | — |
| 2009–10 | SaiPa | SM-liiga | 56 | 7 | 10 | 17 | 94 | — | — | — | — | — |
| 2010–11 | SaiPa | SM-liiga | 40 | 1 | 4 | 5 | 87 | — | — | — | — | — |
| 2011–12 | SaiPa | SM-liiga | 51 | 3 | 7 | 10 | 105 | — | — | — | — | — |
| 2012–13 | KalPa | SM-liiga | 10 | 0 | 0 | 0 | 16 | — | — | — | — | — |
| 2013–14 | Arystan Temirtau | KAZ | 8 | 0 | 1 | 1 | 0 | — | — | — | — | — |
| 2013–14 | SønderjyskE Ishockey | DEN | 1 | 0 | 0 | 0 | 2 | — | — | — | — | — |
| 2013–14 | KooKoo | Mestis | 27 | 1 | 9 | 10 | 55 | 6 | 0 | 0 | 0 | 10 |
| 2014–15 | KooKoo | Mestis | 45 | 2 | 5 | 7 | 93 | 2 | 0 | 0 | 0 | 14 |
| 2015–16 | Ketterä Imatra | FIN.3 | 28 | 5 | 18 | 23 | 55 | 6 | 0 | 1 | 1 | 54 |
| SM-liiga totals | | | 497 | 27 | 47 | 74 | 1101 | 3 | 0 | 0 | 0 | 6 |
| AHL totals | | | 106 | 7 | 14 | 21 | 203 | 3 | 0 | 0 | 0 | 2 |
