= HC Rys =

- City: Podolsk, Russia
- League: Vysshaya Liga
- Founded: 2008
- Home arena: Bagration Sports Palace
- Colours: Yellow, White, Black
- Head coach: Aleksandr Ardachev

HC Rys Podolsk was an ice hockey team in Podolsk, Russia. They played in the Vysshaya Liga, the second level of Russian ice hockey, from 2008-2010.
