= Chris Nielsen =

Canadian ice hockey player (born 1980)

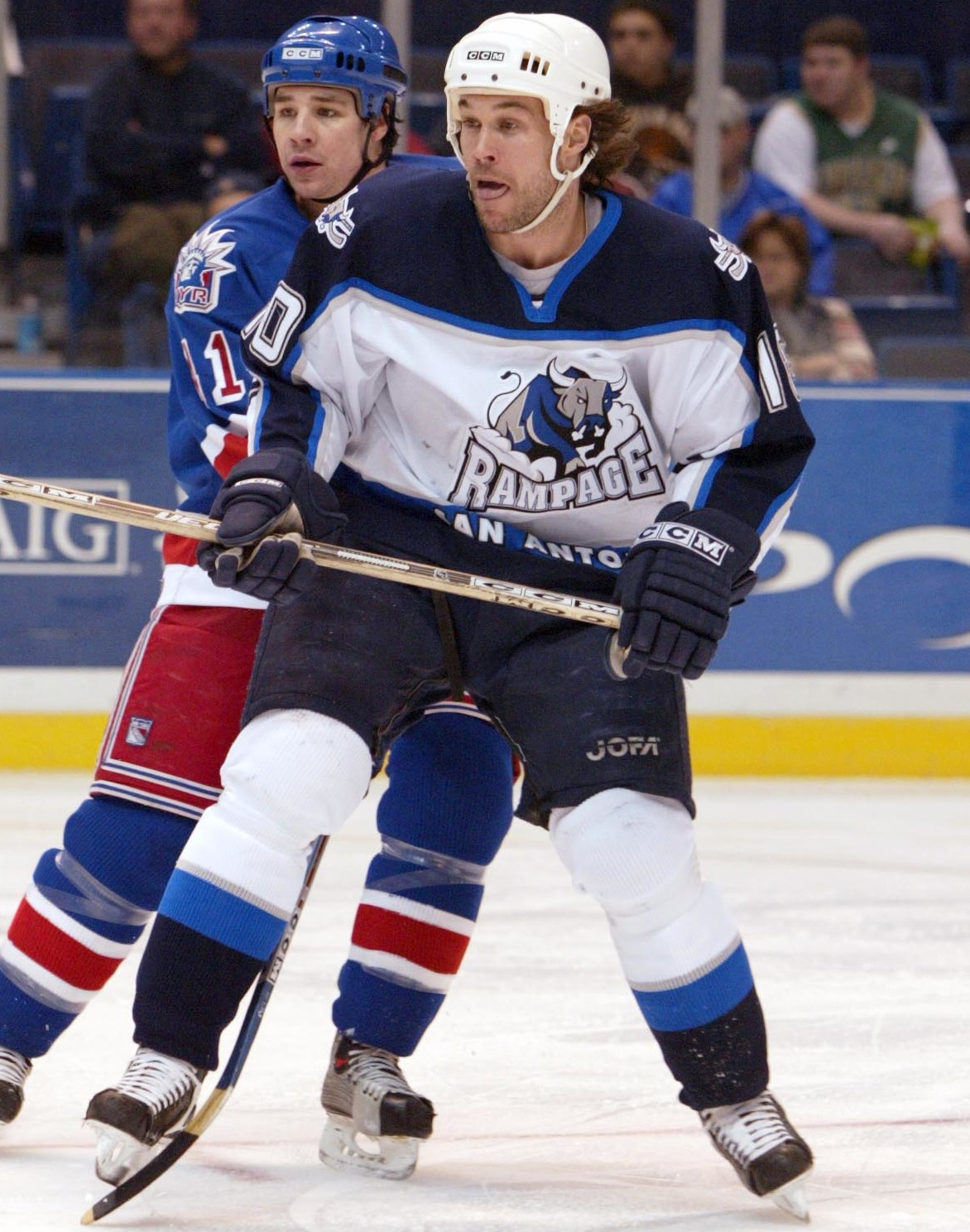
- Nielsen with the San Antonio Rampage in 2005
- Born: February 16, 1980 (age 46) Moshi, Tanzania
- Height: 6 ft 2 in (188 cm)
- Weight: 200 lb (91 kg; 14 st 4 lb)
- Position: Centre
- Shot: Right
- Played for: Columbus Blue Jackets; Kassel Huskies
- NHL draft: 36th overall, 1998; New York Islanders
- Playing career: 2000–2006

Chris Nielsen (born February 16, 1980) is a Tanzanian-born Canadian former professional ice hockey centre. Nielsen was drafted in the 2nd round, 36th overall by the New York Islanders in the 1998 NHL entry draft. He played parts of two seasons with the Columbus Blue Jackets.

Nielsen was born in Tanzania while his Canadian father was stationed there working for the Canadian International Development Agency. His family moved back to Canada when he was three, and he grew up on a farm near the small town of Goodlands, Manitoba.

== Playing career ==
Nielsen played junior hockey with the Calgary Hitmen of the Western Hockey League. He was a member of the 1998–99 team that won the President's Cup, and got within a game of winning the Memorial Cup. He won the Doug Wickenheiser Memorial Trophy in 1999–2000 as the WHL's Humanitarian of the Year.

Nielsen turned pro in 2000, playing three seasons with the Syracuse Crunch of the American Hockey League, earning two callups to the Blue Jackets during that time. He then bounced around between the Chicago Wolves, Manitoba Moose and San Antonio Rampage of the AHL and the Laredo Bucks of the Central Hockey League before heading to Europe to play in Germany in 2005–06. Nielsen retired from professional hockey in 2006.

After retiring from hockey, Nielsen went back to school at the University of Manitoba and was the colour commentator for the Manitoba Moose at their home games. He then completed undergraduate and postgraduate medical education at the University of Calgary, graduating from the Cumming School of Medicine in 2012 and completing his residency in Orthopaedic Surgery in 2017. Dr. Nielsen then moved to Toronto for fellowship, completing his training in complex spinal surgery at Toronto Western Hospital in 2018, at which time he transitioned into the role of Clinical Associate. He is now an Attending Surgeon at University Health Network and an Assistant Professor in the Division of Orthopaedic Surgery with the Temerty Faculty of Medicine at the University of Toronto.

== Career statistics ==
=== Regular season and playoffs ===
			Regular season					Playoffs
Season	Team	League	GP	G	A	Pts	PIM	GP	G	A	Pts	PIM
1995–96	Calgary Hitmen	WHL	6	0	0	0	0	—	—	—	—	—
1996–97	Calgary Hitmen	WHL	62	11	19	30	39	—	—	—	—	—
1997–98	Calgary Hitmen	WHL	68	22	29	51	31	18	2	4	6	10
1998–99	Calgary Hitmen	WHL	70	22	24	46	45	21	11	5	16	28
1999–00	Calgary Hitmen	WHL	62	38	31	69	86	13	14	9	23	20
2000–01	Syracuse Crunch	AHL	47	10	11	21	24	5	2	2	4	4
2000–01	Columbus Blue Jackets	NHL	29	4	5	9	4	—	—	—	—	—
2001–02	Syracuse Crunch	AHL	47	12	12	24	18	10	2	2	4	2
2001–02	Columbus Blue Jackets	NHL	23	2	3	5	4	—	—	—	—	—
2002–03	Syracuse Crunch	AHL	19	1	3	4	8	—	—	—	—	—
2002–03	Chicago Wolves	AHL	18	3	4	7	4	—	—	—	—	—
2002–03	Manitoba Moose	AHL	33	3	10	13	13	14	1	2	3	16
2003–04	Manitoba Moose	AHL	72	4	7	11	21	—	—	—	—	—
2004–05	Laredo Bucks	CHL	7	0	4	4	4	—	—	—	—	—
2004–05	San Antonio Rampage	AHL	54	8	8	16	20	—	—	—	—	—
2005–06	Kassel Huskies	DEL	38	4	11	15	32	—	—	—	—	—
NHL totals			52	6	8	14	8	—	—	—	—	—

=== International ===
Year	Team	Event	Result	GP	G	A	Pts	PIM
1999	Canada	WJC	2nd place, silver medalist(s)	2	1	0	1	4
2000	Canada	WJC	3rd place, bronze medalist(s)	7	3	0	3	8
Junior totals				9	4	0	4	12

== Awards and honours ==
- 1999 - WHL Daryl K. (Doc) Seaman Trophy
- 2000 - WHL Daryl K. (Doc) Seaman Trophy.
- 2000 - WHL Humanitarian of the Year Award.

== Transactions ==
- June 27, 1998 - Drafted in the 2nd round, 36th overall by the New York Islanders in the 1998 NHL entry draft.
- May 11, 2000 - Traded by the New York Islanders to the Columbus Blue Jackets for the Blue Jackets' 4th round selection (Jonas Rönnqvist) and 9th round selection (Dmitri Altarev) in the 2000 NHL entry draft.
- December 2, 2002 - Traded by the Columbus Blue Jackets with Petteri Nummelin to the Atlanta Thrashers for Tomi Kallio and Pauli Levokari.
- January 20, 2003 - Traded by the Atlanta Thrashers with Chris Herperger to the Vancouver Canucks for Jeff Farkas.

Awards and achievements
Preceded by Kyle Rossiter	Winner of the WHL Daryl K. (Doc) Seaman Trophy; 1999, 2000	Succeeded by Dan Hulak
Preceded by Andrew Ference	Winner of the WHL Humanitarian of the Year Award; 2000	Succeeded by Jim Vandermeer
