= Jiří Cetkovský =

Czech ice hockey player

Jiri Cetkovsky
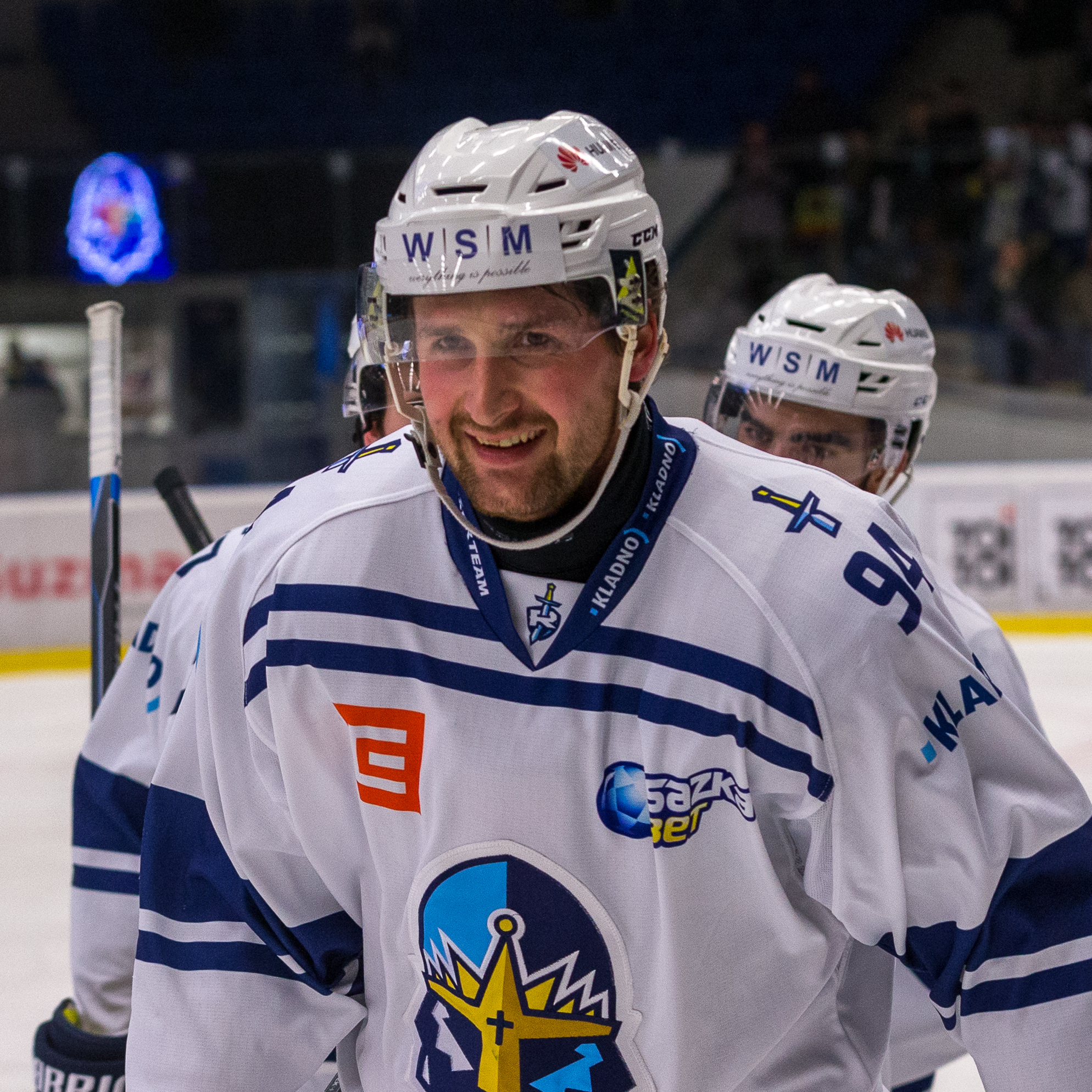
- Born: November 4, 1983 (age 42) Prostějov, Czechoslovakia
- Height: 6 ft 6 in (198 cm)
- Weight: 220 lb (100 kg; 15 st 10 lb)
- Position: Forward
- Shot: Left
- Czech 1. Liga team: HC Kladno
- Played for: HC Pardubice
- NHL draft: 141st overall, 2002; Calgary Flames
- Playing career: 2004–2018

Jiří Cetkovský (born November 4, 1983) is a Czech professional ice hockey player. Cetkovsky currently plays for HC Kladno.

== Playing career ==
Cetkovsky was selected by the Calgary Flames in the fifth round (141st overall) of the 2002 NHL entry draft. For the 2002–03 season, Cetkovsky moved to Calgary, and played with the Calgary Hitmen junior team. In 2003, Cetkovsky returned to the Czech Republic and played for HK Jestřábi Prostějov of the Czech2 league. In 2004, Cetkovsky transferred to HC Pardubice of the Czech Extraliga. Cetkovsky played with Pardubice until 2011. Cetkovsky moved to Mladá Boleslav in 2011.

== Career statistics ==
			Regular season					Playoffs
Season	Team	League	GP	G	A	Pts	PIM	GP	G	A	Pts	PIM
1999–2000	HC MBL Olomouc	CZE U18	25	7	3	10	18	—	—	—	—	—
1999–2000	HC Prostějov	CZE.2 U18	5	3	2	5	33	—	—	—	—	—
2000–01	HC Prostějov	CZE.2 U20	28	7	7	14	75	—	—	—	—	—
2001–02	HC Continental Zlín	CZE U20	28	9	6	15	40	2	0	0	0	4
2002–03	Calgary Hitmen	WHL	57	5	2	7	126	5	0	0	0	15
2003–04	HC Prostějov	CZE U20	23	7	7	14	86	6	2	2	4	28
2003–04	HC Prostějov	CZE.2	8	1	0	1	12	—	—	—	—	—
2004–05	HC Moeller Pardubice	ELH	1	0	0	0	0	—	—	—	—	—
2004–05	HC VČE Hradec Králové, a.s.	CZE.2	49	4	8	12	58	2	0	0	0	58
2005–06	HC Moeller Pardubice	ELH	34	0	1	1	30	—	—	—	—	—
2005–06	HC VČE Hradec Králové, a.s.	CZE.2	10	2	2	4	20	—	—	—	—	—
2006–07	HC Moeller Pardubice	ELH	16	0	1	1	40	9	1	0	1	6
2006–07	HC VČE Hradec Králové, a.s.	CZE.2	16	7	4	11	12	—	—	—	—	—
2007–08	HC Moeller Pardubice	ELH	43	12	6	18	79	—	—	—	—	—
2007–08	HC VCES Hradec Králové, a.s.	CZE.2	2	1	2	3	0	—	—	—	—	—
2008–09	HC Moeller Pardubice	ELH	48	13	14	27	66	6	0	1	1	33
2009–10	HC Eaton Pardubice	ELH	47	14	13	27	103	12	2	3	5	53
2010–11	HC Eaton Pardubice	ELH	18	3	3	6	14	—	—	—	—	—
2010–11	HC Chrudim	CZE.2	1	0	1	1	0	—	—	—	—	—
2011–12	HC ČSOB Pojišťovna Pardubice	ELH	7	0	0	0	8	19	4	3	7	20
2011–12	BK Mladá Boleslav	ELH	28	3	7	10	28	—	—	—	—	—
2012–13	HC ČSOB Pojišťovna Pardubice	ELH	41	6	8	14	32	5	0	0	0	8
2012–13	Královští lvi Hradec Králové, a.s.	CZE.2	5	1	1	2	2	—	—	—	—	—
2013–14	HC ČSOB Pojišťovna Pardubice	ELH	39	7	7	14	42	10	1	3	4	12
2014–15	HC ČSOB Pojišťovna Pardubice	ELH	37	5	7	12	119	6	0	2	2	2
2015–16	HC BAK Trutnov	CZE.3	15	2	3	5	12	—	—	—	—	—
2015–16	LHK Jestřábi Prostějov	CZE.2	25	8	12	20	49	4	0	3	3	4
2015–16	HC Dynamo Pardubice	ELH	7	0	0	0	16	—	—	—	—	—
2016–17	Rytíři Kladno	CZE.2	47	10	6	16	24	6	0	0	0	16
2017–18	HC Nové Zámky	SVK	38	5	8	13	33	—	—	—	—	—
2017–18	LHK Jestřábi Prostějov	CZE.2	5	0	1	1	0	—	—	—	—	—
ELH totals			366	63	67	130	577	67	8	12	20	134
CZE.2 totals			168	34	37	71	179	12	0	3	3	78
