= Jean-François Damphousse =

Canadian ice hockey player (born 1979)

- Born: July 21, 1979 (age 46) Saint-Alexis-des-Monts, Quebec, Canada
- Height: 6 ft 0 in (183 cm)
- Weight: 175 lb (79 kg; 12 st 7 lb)
- Position: Goaltender
- Caught: Left
- Played for: New Jersey Devils
- NHL draft: 24th overall, 1997; New Jersey Devils
- Playing career: 1998–2005

Jean-François Damphousse (born July 21, 1979) is a Canadian former professional ice hockey goaltender. He played six games in the National Hockey League with the New Jersey Devils during the 2001–02 season. The rest of his career, which lasted from 1999 to 2005, was mainly spent in the American Hockey League. He is currently a scout for the National Hockey League.

== Early life ==
Damphousse was born in Saint-Alexis-des-Monts, Quebec. As a youth, he played in the 1992 and 1993 Quebec International Pee-Wee Hockey Tournaments with minor ice hockey teams from Central Mauricie, and Sainte-Foy, Quebec City.

== Career ==
Damphousse was drafted by the New Jersey Devils in the first round of the 1997 NHL entry draft with the 24th overall pick. After playing three years of junior hockey with the Moncton Wildcats of the Quebec Major Junior Hockey League, and a brief stop with the Augusta Lynx of the ECHL, Damphousse moved up to the Devils' American Hockey League affiliate, the Albany River Rats. In the 2001–02 NHL season, Damphousse made his only National Hockey League appearances, playing in six games with the Devils.

In the seasons following his brief NHL experience, Damphousse bounced around the AHL, playing for the Cincinnati Mighty Ducks, Saint John Flames and Hamilton Bulldogs. He also appeared in 53 games for Quebec Radio X of the Ligue Nord-Américaine de Hockey in the 2004–05 season.

== Career statistics ==
=== Regular season and playoffs ===
			Regular season									Playoffs
Season	Team	League	GP	W	L	T	MIN	GA	SO	GAA	SV%	GP	W	L	MIN	GA	SO	GAA	SV%
1993–94	Ste-Foy Gouverneurs	QAHA	18	10	1	0	1078	53	0	2.95	—	14	10	4	842	50	0	3.52	—
1994–95	Ste-Foy Gouverneurs	QAHA	16	—	—	—	958	48	0	3.01	—	—	—	—	—	—	—	—	—
1994–95	Ste-Foy Gouverneurs	QMAAA	2	1	0	1	120	8	0	3.84	—	—	—	—	—	—	—	—	—
1995–96	Ste-Foy Gouverneurs	QMAAA	32	18	10	1	1629	83	2	3.06	—	—	—	—	—	—	—	—	—
1996–97	Moncton Wildcats	QMJHL	39	6	25	2	2063	190	0	5.53	.872	—	—	—	—	—	—	—	—
1997–98	Moncton Wildcats	QMJHL	59	24	26	6	3400	174	1	3.07	.903	10	5	5	595	28	0	2.82	—
1998–99	Moncton Wildcats	QMJHL	40	19	17	2	2163	121	1	3.36	.891	4	0	4	200	12	0	3.60	.876
1998–99	Albany River Rats	AHL	1	0	1	0	59	3	0	3.06	.893	—	—	—	—	—	—	—	—
1999–00	Augusta Lynx	ECHL	14	4	7	0	676	49	0	4.35	.886	—	—	—	—	—	—	—	—
1999–00	Albany River Rats	AHL	26	9	11	2	1326	62	0	2.81	.920	2	0	1	62	4	0	3.86	.897
2000–01	Albany River Rats	AHL	55	24	23	3	2963	141	1	2.86	.914	—	—	—	—	—	—	—	—
2001–02	New Jersey Devils	NHL	6	1	3	0	294	12	0	2.45	.896	—	—	—	—	—	—	—	—
2001–02	Albany River Rats	AHL	18	3	11	2	1001	57	0	3.42	.902	—	—	—	—	—	—	—	—
2002–03	Cincinnati Mighty Ducks	AHL	31	12	14	4	1669	87	0	3.13	.902	—	—	—	—	—	—	—	—
2002–03	Saint John Flames	AHL	10	5	5	0	591	23	0	2.33	.911	—	—	—	—	—	—	—	—
2003–04	Hamilton Bulldogs	AHL	35	19	11	4	2010	77	2	2.30	.912	10	4	6	592	25	1	2.54	.913
2004–05	Radio X de Québec	LNAH	39	27	8	0	2326	111	—	2.86	—	1	—	—	—	0	1	0.00	1.000
NHL totals			6	1	3	0	294	12	0	2.45	.896	—	—	—	—	—	—	—	—

Awards and achievements
Preceded by Lance Ward	New Jersey Devils first-round draft pick 1997	Succeeded by Mike Van Ryn
