= Gazprom-OGU Orenburg =

- City: Orenburg, Russia
- League: Vysshaya Liga
- Founded: 1998
- Home arena: Ice Palace Rostoshi
- Colours: Red, White, Black

Gazprom-OGU Orenburg is an ice hockey team in Orenburg, Russia. They play in the Vysshaya Liga, the second level of Russian ice hockey. The club was founded in 1998, and affiliated with Dynamo Moscow of the Kontinental Hockey League in 2008.
