= Alexei Ivanov (ice hockey, born 1985) =

Russian ice hockey player

- Born: January 5, 1985 (age 41) Tynda, Russia
- Height: 5 ft 10 in (178 cm)
- Weight: 192 lb (87 kg; 13 st 10 lb)
- Position: Centre
- Shoots: Left
- VHL team Former teams: Dizel Penza; Salavat Yulaev Ufa
- NHL draft: 156th overall, 2003; Chicago Blackhawks
- Playing career: 2003–present

Alexei Vladimirovich Ivanov (Russian: Алексей Владимирович Иванов) (born January 5, 1985) is a Russian professional ice hockey player.

== Career ==
Ivanov was selected by the Chicago Blackhawks in the fifth round (156th overall) of the 2003 NHL entry draft. He plays with Dizel Penza in the Supreme Hockey League.
