= List of New Jersey Devils records =

This is a list of franchise records for the New Jersey Devils of the National Hockey League. (Updated through November 7, 2025)

== Career regular season leaders ==
=== Skaters ===
Games played
#	Player	GP	Seasons
1	Ken Daneyko	1,283	1983–2003
2	Patrik Elias	1,240	1995–2016
3	Travis Zajac	1,024	2006–2021
4	Scott Stevens	956	1991–2004
5	John MacLean	934	1983–1998
Active leader
19	Jesper Bratt	566	2017–present

Goals
#	Player	G	Seasons
1	Patrik Elias	408	1995–2016
2	John MacLean	347	1983–1998
3	Bobby Holik	202	1992–2002, 2008–2009
3	Travis Zajac	202	2006–2021
5	Zach Parise	194	2005–2012
Active leader
7	Nico Hischier	174	2017–present

Assists
#	Player	A	Seasons
1	Patrik Elias	617	1995–2016
2	Scott Niedermayer	364	1991–2004
3	Scott Gomez	361	1999–2007, 2014–2015
4	John MacLean	354	1983–1998
5	Travis Zajac	348	2006–2021
Active leader
9	Jesper Bratt	306	2017–present

Points
#	Player	Pts	Seasons
1	Patrik Elias	1,025	1995–2016
2	John MacLean	701	1983–1998
3	Travis Zajac	550	2006–2021
4	Kirk Muller	520	1984–1991
5	Scott Gomez	484	1999–2007, 2014–2015
Active leader
8	Jesper Bratt	461	2017–present

Penalties in minutes
#	Player	PIM	Seasons
1	Ken Daneyko	2,516	1983–2003
2	Randy McKay	1,418	1991–2002
3	John MacLean	1,168	1983–1998
4	Scott Stevens	1,007	1991–2004
5	Pat Verbeek	943	1982–1989
Active leader
73	Jonas Siegenthaler	160	2018–present

Power play goals
#	Player	PPG	Seasons
1	Patrik Elias	113	1995–2016
2	John MacLean	92	1983–1998
3	Kirk Muller	69	1984–1991
4	Kyle Palmieri	53	2015–2021
4	Pat Verbeek	53	1982–1989
Active leader
14	Nico Hischier	40	2017–present

Shorthanded goals
#	Player	SHG	Seasons
1	John Madden	17	1998–2009
2	Patrik Elias	16	1995–2016
3	Adam Henrique	13	2010–2018
4	Travis Zajac	12	2006–2021
5	Doug Brown	11	1986–1993
Active leader
T-14	Nico Hischier	6	2017–present

Game winning goals
#	Player	GWG	Seasons
1	Patrik Elias	80	1995–2016
2	John MacLean	55	1983–1998
3	Bobby Holik	43	1992–2002, 2008–2009
4	Zach Parise	37	2005–2012
5	Jamie Langenbrunner	32	2001–2011
Active leader
11	Jesper Bratt	26	2017–present

Overtime goals
#	Player	OTG	Seasons
1	Patrik Elias	16	1995–2016
2	Jack Hughes	9	1991–2004
3	Scott Niedermayer	8	1991-2004
4	Zach Parise	7	2005–2012
5	John Moore	6	2015-2018
5	Nico Hischier	6	2017-present
Active leader
2	Jack Hughes	9	2019—present

Highest +/-
#	Player	+	Seasons
1	Scott Stevens	282	1991–2004
2	Patrik Elias	172	1995–2016
2	Scott Niedermayer	172	1991–2004
4	Bobby Holik	134	1992–2002, 2008–2009
5	Randy McKay	115	1991–2002
Active leader
35	Nico Hischier	25	2017—present

Points per game
#	Player	PPG	Seasons
1	Taylor Hall	.986	2016–2019
2	Jack Hughes	.966	2019–present
3	Alexander Mogilny	.942	2000–2001, 2005
4	Kirk Muller	.935	1984–1991
5	Ilya Kovalchuk	.905	2010–2013
Active leader
2	Jack Hughes	.966	2020–present

=== Goaltenders ===
Games played
#	Player	GP	Seasons
1	Martin Brodeur	1,259	1991–2014
2	Cory Schneider	311	2013–2020
3	Chris Terreri	302	1988–1996, 1998–2001
4	Chico Resch	267	1981–1986
5	Sean Burke	162	1987–1991
Active leader
18	Nico Daws	46	2021–present

Wins
#	Player	W	Seasons
1	Martin Brodeur	688	1991–2014
2	Chris Terreri	118	1988–1996, 1998–2001
3	Cory Schneider	115	2013–2020
4	Chico Resch	67	1981–1986
5	Mackenzie Blackwood	65	2018–2023
Active leader
T-14	Jacob Markstrom	21	2024–present

Losses
#	Player	L	Seasons
1	Martin Brodeur	394	1991–2014
2	Chico Resch	148	1981–1986
3	Cory Schneider	133	2013–2020
4	Chris Terreri	118	1988–1996, 1998–2001
5	Michel Plasse	89	1974–1975, 1976–1979
Active leader
20	Nico Daws	21	2022–present

Goals against average
#	Player	GAA	Seasons
1	Martin Brodeur	2.24	1991–2014
2	Cory Schneider	2.50	2013–2020
3	Keith Kinkaid	2.90	2014–2019
4	Mackenzie Blackwood	2.97	2018–2023
5	Chris Terreri	3.07	1988–1996, 1998–2001
Active leader
	N/A		

- Minimum 50 games

Save percentage
#	Player	SV%	Seasons
1	Cory Schneider	.915	2013–2020
2	Martin Brodeur	.912	1991–2014
3	Mackenzie Blackwood	.906	2018–2023
3	Keith Kinkaid	.906	2014–2019
Active leader
	N/A		

- Minimum 50 games

Shutouts
#	Player	SO	Seasons
1	Martin Brodeur	124	1991–2014
2	Cory Schneider	17	2013–2020
3	Mackenzie Blackwood	8	2018–2023
3	Johan Hedberg	8	2010–2013
4	Keith Kinkaid	7	2014–2019
Active leader
T-7	Jake Allen	4	2024–present
T-7	Jacob Markstrom	4	2024–present

== Single season records ==
=== Skaters ===
Goals
#	Player	G	Season
1	Brian Gionta	48	2005–06
2	Pat Verbeek	46	1987–88
3	John MacLean	45	1990–91
3	Zach Parise	45	2008–09
5	Alexander Mogilny	43	2000–01
5	Jack Hughes	43	2022–23

Assists
#	Player	A	Season
1	Jesper Bratt	67	2024–2025
2	Scott Stevens	60	1993–94
3	Aaron Broten	57	1987–88
3	Kirk Muller	57	1987–88
4	Jack Hughes	56	2022–23
4	Patrik Elias	56	2001–02

Points
#	Player	Pts	Season
1	Jack Hughes	99	2022-23
2	Patrik Elias	96	2000-01
3	Zach Parise	94	2008–09
3	Kirk Muller	94	1987–88
5	Taylor Hall	93	2017-18

Points (defenseman)
#	Player	Pts	Season
1	Scott Stevens	78	1993–94
2	Dougie Hamilton	72	2022-23
3	Tom Kurvers	66	1988–89
4	Rob Ramage	62	1980-81
5	Barry Beck	60	1977-78

Points (rookie)
#	Player	Pts	Season
1	Scott Gomez	70	1999–00
2	Kevin Todd	63	1991–92
2	Barry Beck	60	1977–78
4	Paul Gardner	59	1976–77
5	Kirk Muller	54	1984–85

Penalties in minutes
#	Player	PIM	Season
1	Krzysztof Oliwa	295	1997–98
2	Ken Daneyko	283	1988–89
3	David Maley	249	1988–89
3	Ken Daneyko	249	1990–91
5	Randy McKay	246	1991–92

Highest +/-
#	Player	+	Seasons
1	Scott Stevens	53	1993–94
2	Patrik Elias	45	2000–01
3	Tomas Tatar	41	2022–23
4	Scott Stevens	40	2000–01
5	Dave Andreychuk	38	1996–97

=== Goaltenders ===
Games played
#	Player	W	Season
1	Martin Brodeur	78	2006–07
2	Martin Brodeur	77	1995–96
2	Martin Brodeur	77	2007–08
2	Martin Brodeur	77	2009–10
5	Martin Brodeur	75	2003–04

Wins
#	Player	W	Season
1	Martin Brodeur	48	2006–07
2	Martin Brodeur	45	2009–10
3	Martin Brodeur	44	2007–08
4	Martin Brodeur	43	1997–98
4	Martin Brodeur	43	1999–2000
4	Martin Brodeur	43	2005–06

Losses
#	Player	L	Season
1	Denis Herron	39	1975–76
2	Chico Resch	35	1982–83
3	4 players tied	31	––

Goals against average
#	Player	GAA	Season
1	Martin Brodeur	1.88	1996–97
2	Martin Brodeur	1.89	1997–98
3	Cory Schneider	1.97	2013–14
4	Martin Brodeur	2.02	2002–03
5	Martin Brodeur	2.03	2003–04

Save percentage
#	Player	SV%	Season
1	Martin Brodeur	.927	1996–97
2	Cory Schneider	.925	2014–15
3	Cory Schneider	.924	2015–16
4	Martin Brodeur	.922	2006–07
5	Cory Schneider	.921	2013–14

Shutouts
#	Player	SO	Season
1	Martin Brodeur	12	2006–07
2	Martin Brodeur	11	2003–04
3	Martin Brodeur	10	1996–97
3	Martin Brodeur	10	1997–98
5	Martin Brodeur	9	2000–01

== Career playoff leaders ==
=== Skaters ===
Games played
#	Player	GP	Seasons
1	Ken Daneyko	175	1983–2003
2	Patrik Elias	162	1995–2016
3	Scott Stevens	153	1991–2004
4	Scott Niedermayer	146	1991–2014
5	Jay Pandolfo	131	1996–2010
Active leader
T–85	Nico Hischier	17	2017–present

Goals
#	Player	G	Seasons
1	Patrik Elias	45	1995–2016
2	Claude Lemieux	34	1990–1995, 1999–2000
3	John MacLean	31	1983–1998
4	Petr Sykora	24	1995–2002, 2011–2012
5	Scott Gomez	21	1999–2007, 2014–2015
Active leader
T–34	Jack Hughes	6	2019–present

Assists
#	Player	A	Seasons
1	Patrik Elias	80	1995–2016
2	Scott Niedermayer	47	1991–2004
3	Scott Stevens	45	1991–2004
4	John MacLean	44	1983–1998
4	Scott Gomez	44	1999–2007, 2014–2015
Active leader
T–56	Nico Hischier	6	2017–present

Points
#	Player	Pts	Seasons
1	Patrik Elias	125	1995–2016
2	John MacLean	75	1983–1998
3	Scott Gomez	65	1999–2007, 2014–2015
4	Scott Niedermayer	64	1991–2004
5	Scott Stevens	62	1991–2004
Active leader
T–49	Jack Hughes	11	2019–present

Penalties in minutes
#	Player	PIM	Seasons
1	Ken Daneyko	296	1983–2003
2	Scott Stevens	186	1991–2004
3	Claude Lemieux	171	1990–1995, 1999–2000
4	John MacLean	142	1983–1998
5	Colin White	125	2000–2011
Active leader
59	Timo Meier	22	2021–present

=== Goaltenders ===
Games played
#	Player	GP	Seasons
1	Martin Brodeur	205	1991–2014
2	Chris Terreri	27	1988–1996, 1998–2001
3	Sean Burke	19	1987–1991
4	Akira Schmid	9	2021–present
5	Vitek Vanecek	7	2022–present
Active leader
23	Jake Allen	14	2024–present

Wins
#	Player	W	Seasons
1	Martin Brodeur	113	1991–2014
2	Chris Terreri	12	1988–1996, 1998–2001
3	Sean Burke	9	1987–1991
4	Akira Schmid	4	2021–present
5	Bob Sauve	2	1987–1989
Active leader
19	Jake Allen	7	2024–present

Losses
#	Player	L	Seasons
1	Martin Brodeur	91	1991–2014
2	Chris Terreri	12	1988–1996, 1998–2001
3	Sean Burke	10	1987–1991
4	Akira Schmid	4	2021–present
5	Vitek Vanecek	3	2022–present
Active leader
24	Jake Allen	6	2021–present

Goals against average
#	Player	GAA	Seasons
1	Martin Brodeur	2.02	1991–2014
2	Bob Sauve	3.30	1987–1989
3	Chris Terreri	3.37	1988–1996, 1998–2001
4	Sean Burke	3.47	1987–1991
Active leader
N/A	—	—	—

Save percentage
#	Player	SV%	Seasons
1	Martin Brodeur	.919	1991–2014
2	Bob Sauve	.890	1987–1989
2	Chris Terreri	.890	1988–1996, 1998–2001
4	Sean Burke	.886	1987–1991
Active leader
N/A	—	—	—

Shutouts
#	Player	S0	Seasons
1	Martin Brodeur	24	1991–2014
2	Akira Schmid	2	2021–2024
3	Sean Burke	1	1987–1991
Active leader
	N/A		

== Team records ==
- Most consecutive wins in a season: 13 (2000–01) (2022–23)
- Most points in a season: 112 (2022–23)
- Most wins in a season: 52 (2022–23)
- Longest season-ending win streak: 11 (2005–06) (also an NHL record)
