= List of New Jersey Devils players =

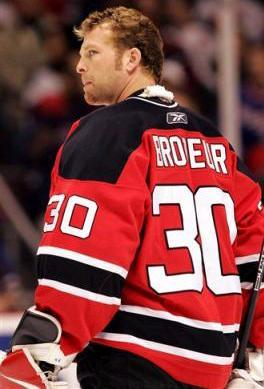
Goaltender Martin Brodeur has helped lead the New Jersey Devils to three Stanley Cup championships.

The New Jersey Devils are a professional ice hockey team based in Newark, New Jersey. They are members of the Metropolitan Division of the National Hockey League's (NHL) Eastern Conference. The Devils franchise has been a part of the NHL since 1974, when the team entered the league as the Kansas City Scouts. Two years later, they moved to Denver, Colorado, and became the Colorado Rockies. The team stayed there until 1982, when they moved to New Jersey.

505 players have played on the team; 15 players have had multiple stints. The Devils have won the Stanley Cup three times with a total of 54 different players. Five players (Martin Brodeur, Sergei Brylin, Ken Daneyko, Scott Niedermayer and Scott Stevens) have been a part of all three Cup wins, and eleven more have won two. Of the 282 players, Ken Daneyko has played the most games with the team, playing all 1283 games of his NHL career in New Jersey. On the other end of the spectrum, nine players have played just one regular season game on the team; Steve Brule's only appearance with New Jersey came in the 2000 Stanley Cup Playoffs. The Devils have had eleven captains; Jamie Langenbrunner held the captaincy since December 5, 2007, until he was traded in the middle of the 2010–11 season. He was replaced by Zach Parise at the start of the following season. Nico Hischier is the current captain. The Devils have retired five jersey numbers; #3 for career Devil Ken Daneyko, #4 for longtime captain Scott Stevens, #27 for Scott Niedermayer, #30 for Martin Brodeur, and #26 for the franchise's all-time leading scorer Patrik Elias. Eleven Devils are enshrined in the Hockey Hall of Fame: Viacheslav Fetisov, Peter Stastny, Scott Stevens, Igor Larionov, Doug Gilmour, Scott Niedermayer, Brendan Shanahan, Joe Nieuwendyk, Phil Housley, Dave Andreychuk and Martin Brodeur.

Patrik Elias surpassed former teammate and head coach John MacLean on March 17, 2009, with his 702nd point to become the Devils' all-time leading scorer. He also passed MacLean's goal scoring record on December 17, 2011. Martin Brodeur holds nearly every team record for goaltenders, having been the team's starting goaltender since the 1994–95 NHL season. In addition to his team records, he is the winningest goaltender in NHL history, notching his 552nd win on March 17, 2009, to pass his childhood idol Patrick Roy.

This list does not include data from the Kansas City Scouts and the Colorado Rockies. The seasons column lists the first year of the season of the player's first game and the last year of the season of the player's last game. All the players that were part of a Stanley Cup winning roster have a blue background on their row.

== Key ==
Appeared in an Devils game during the 2025–26 NHL season or is still part of the organization.
Stanley Cup winner, retired jersey or elected to the Hockey Hall of Fame

Abbreviations
GP	Games played
HHOF	Hockey Hall of Fame inductee
SC	Stanley Cup
Ret	Jersey number retired

Goaltenders
W	Wins	SO	Shutouts
L	Losses	GAA	Goals against average
T^{[a]}	Ties	SV%^{[b]}	Save percentage
OTL^{[a]}	Overtime loss		

Skaters
Pos	Position	RW	Right wing	A	Assists
D	Defenseman	C	Center	P	Points
LW	Left wing	G	Goals	PIM	Penalty minutes

Statistics are complete to the end of the 2025–26 NHL season.

== Goaltenders ==
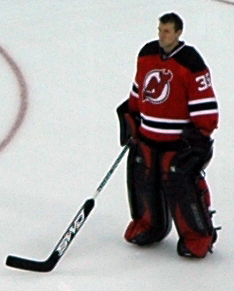
Scott Clemmensen has played in two separate stints for the Devils, most recently in 2009.

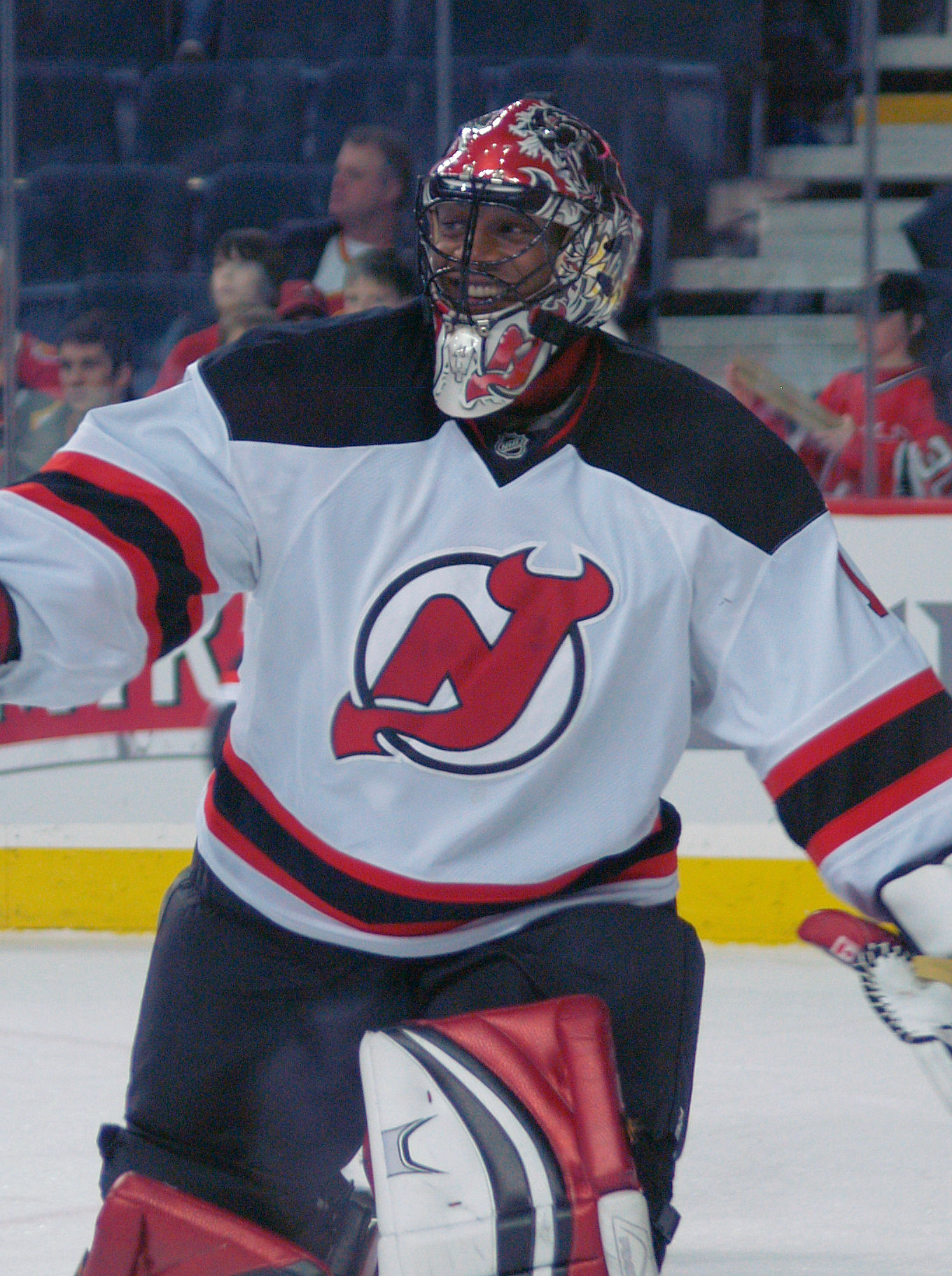
Kevin Weekes joined the Devils in 2007.

	Nat	Seasons	Regular season							Playoffs						Notes
	Nat	Seasons	GP	W	L	T/OT	SO	GAA	SV%	GP	W	L	SO	GAA	SV%	Notes
Appleby, Ken	(Canada)	2017–2018	3	0	1	0	0	1.45	.945	—	—	—	—	—	—	
Allen, Jake	(Canada)	2023–2026	81	36	39	4	5	2.77	.904	—	—	—	—	—	—	
Bernier, Jonathan	(Canada)	2021–2022	10	4	4	1	0	3.06	.902	—	—	—	—	—	—	
Billington, Craig	(Canada)	1985–1989; 1991–1993	111	43	46	8	4	3.98	.866	2	0	1	0	3.85	.872	
Blackwood, Mackenzie	(Canada)	2018–2023	152	65	57	18	8	2.97	.906	—	—	—	—	—	—	
Brodeur, Martin	(Canada)	1991–2014	1,259	688	394	154	124	2.24	.912	205	113	91	24	2.02	.919	SC 1995, 2000, 2003; HHOF 2018; Ret #30
Burke, Sean	(Canada)	1987–1991	162	62	66	23	4	3.65	.876	19	9	10	1	3.47	.886	
Chevrier, Alain	(Canada)	1985–1988	140	53	63	7	1	4.17	.866	—	—	—	—	—	—	
Clemmensen, Scott	(United States)	2001–2007; 2008–2009; 2014–2015	71	32	19	7	4	3.63	.881	1	0	0	0	0.00	1.000	
Comrie, Eric	(Canada)	2020–2021	1	1	0	0	0	3.00	.909	—	—	—	—	—	—	
Damphousse, Jean-Francois	(Canada)	2001–2002	6	1	3	0	0	2.45	.896	—	—	—	—	—	—	
Danis, Yann	(Canada)	2009–2010; 2015–2016	14	3	3	1	0	2.32	.911	—	—	—	—	—	—	
Daws, Nico	(Germany)	2021–2026	55	24	24	1	1	2.96	.898	—	—	—	—	—	—	
Dell, Aaron	(Canada)	2020–2021	7	1	5	0	0	4.14	.857	—	—	—	—	—	—	
Domingue, Louis	(Canada)	2019–2020	16	3	8	2	0	3.79	.882	—	—	—	—	—	—	
Dunham, Mike	(United States)	1996–1998	41	13	12	4	3	2.42	.909	—	—	—	—	—	—	
Erickson, Chad	(United States)	1991–1992	2	1	1	0	0	4.50	.836	—	—	—	—	—	—	
Friesen, Karl	(Canada)	1986–1987	4	0	2	1	0	7.38	.800	—	—	—	—	—	—	
Frazee, Jeff	(Canada)	2012–2013	1	0	0	0	0	0	1.000	—	—	—	—	—	—	
Gillies, Jon	(United States)	2021–2022	19	3	10	1	0	3.76	.885	—	—	—	—	—	—	
Hammond, Andrew	(Canada)	2021–2022	7	1	5	1	0	4.66	.860	—	—	—	—	—	—	
Hedberg, Johan	(Sweden)	2010–2013	80	38	29	7	8	2.42	.908	1	0	1	0	1.65	.929	
Kahkonen, Kaapo	(Finland)	2023–2024	6	1	4	0	1	2.51	.923	—	—	—	—	—	—	
Kamppuri, Hannu	(Finland)	1984–1985	13	1	10	1	0	5.02	.846	—	—	—	—	—	—	
Kinkaid, Keith	(United States)	2012–2013; 2014–2019	151	64	55	17	7	2.90	.906	2	0	2	0	5.88	.804	
Lack, Eddie	(Sweden)	2017–2018	4	1	2	0	0	3.18	.903	—	—	—	—	—	—	
Low, Ron	(Canada)	1982–1985	81	16	43	0	1	4.15	.872	—	—	—	—	—	—	
MacKenzie, Shawn	(Canada)	1982–1983	4	0	1	0	0	6.92	.779	—	—	—	—	—	—	
Markstrom, Jacob	(Sweden)	2024–2026	93	49	35	7	5	2.76	.892	5	1	4	0	2.78	.911	
McKenna, Mike	(United States)	2010–2011	2	0	1	0	0	3.05	.893	—	—	—	—	—	—	
McLean, Kirk	(Canada)	1985–1987	6	2	2	0	0	4.65	.841	—	—	—	—	—	—	
Melanson, Roland	(Canada)	1990–1991	1	0	0	0	0	6.00	.714	—	—	—	—	—	—	
Middlebrook, Lindsay	(Canada)	1982–1983	9	0	6	1	0	5.39	.832	—	—	—	—	—	—	
Reese, Jeff	(Canada)	1996–1997	3	0	2	0	0	5.61	.800	—	—	—	—	—	—	
Resch, Glenn	(Canada)	1982–1986	198	49	113	20	1	4.12	.867	—	—	—	—	—	—	
Sauve, Bob	(Canada)	1987–1989	49	14	21	4	0	3.88	.859	5	2	1	0	3.61	.890	
Schmid, Akira	(Switzerland)	2021–2024	43	14	18	3	1	2.90	.899	9	4	4	2	2.35	.921	
Schneider, Cory	(United States)	2013–2020	311	115	133	50	17	2.50	.915	4	1	3	0	1.78	.950	
Schwab, Corey	(Canada)	1995–1996; 2002–2004	24	7	6	2	2	1.54	.929	2	0	0	0	0.00	1.00	SC 2003
Senn, Gilles	(Switzerland)	2019–2020	2	0	1	0	0	3.42	.902	—	—	—	—	—	—	
Shulmistra, Richard	(Canada)	1997–1998	1	0	1	0	0	1.94	.933	—	—	—	—	—	—	
Sidorkiewicz, Peter	(Canada)	1993–1994; 1997–1998	4	0	3	0	0	2.80	.889	—	—	—	—	—	—	
St. Laurent, Sam	(Canada)	1985–1986	4	2	1	0	1	4.15	.883	—	—	—	—	—	—	
Terreri, Chris	(United States)	1986–1996; 1998–2001	302	118	111	31	7	3.07	.892	27	12	12	0	3.37	.890	SC 1995, 2000
Vanbiesbrouck, John	(United States)	2000–2002	9	6	3	0	1	1.78	.924	—	—	—	—	—	—	
Vanecek, Vitek	(Czech Republic)	2022–2024	84	50	20	7	3	2.73	.903	7	1	3	0	4.64	.825	
Wedgewood, Scott	(Canada)	2015–2016; 2020–2022	23	5	11	4	3	2.77	.908	—	—	—	—	—	—	
Weekes, Kevin	(Canada)	2007–2009	25	9	7	1	0	2.58	.912	—	—	—	—	—	—	

== Skaters ==
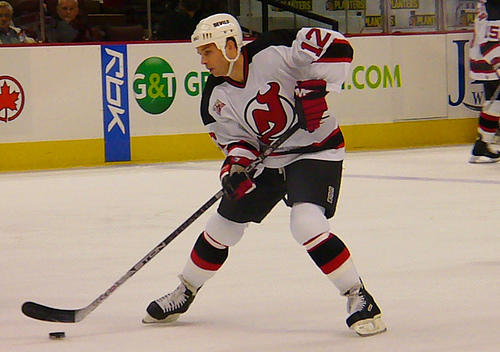
Jim Dowd is one of 3 New Jersey natives to have played with the Devils (Kyle Palmieri and Kenny Agostino being the other two)

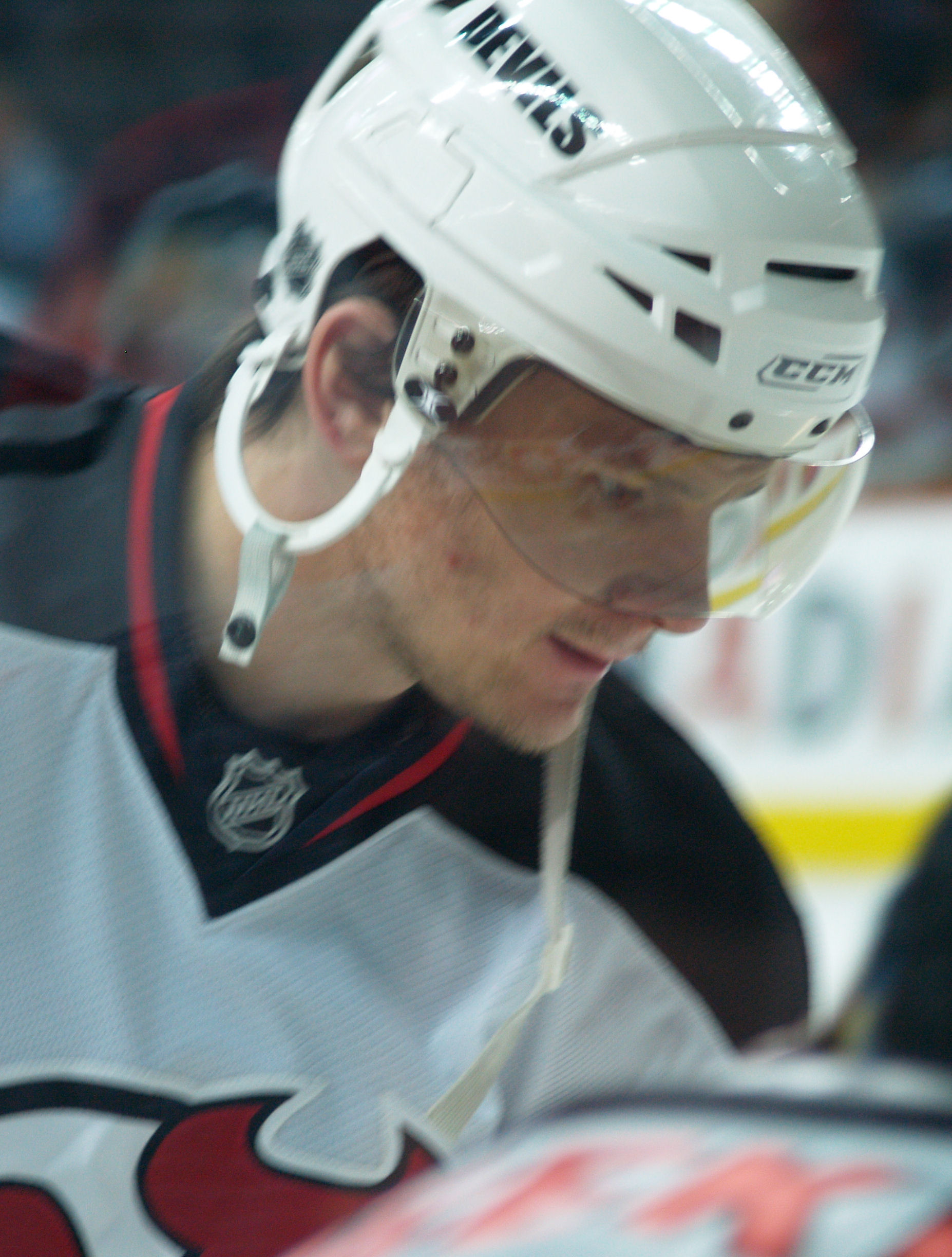
Patrik Elias is the team's all-time leading scorer.

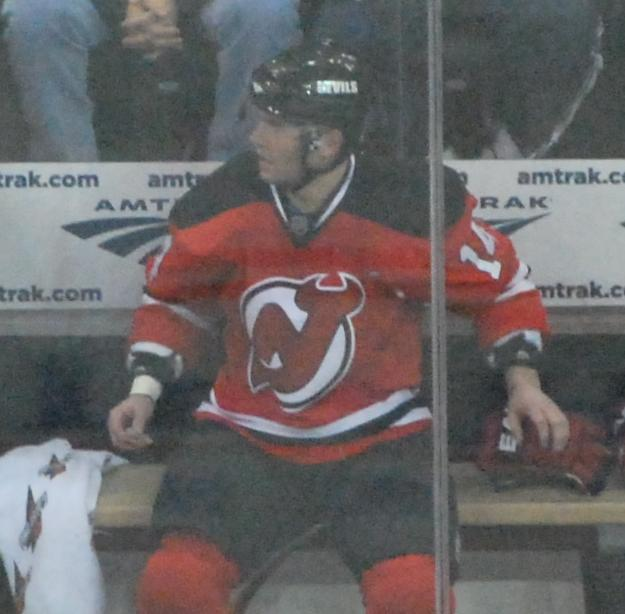
Brian Gionta holds the team record for most goals in a season with 48.

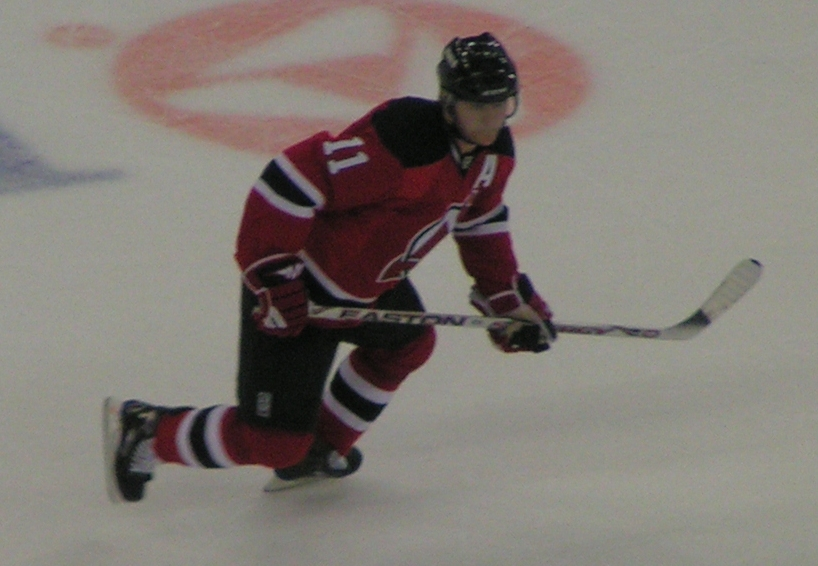
John Madden won two Stanley Cups in New Jersey before joining the Chicago Blackhawks.

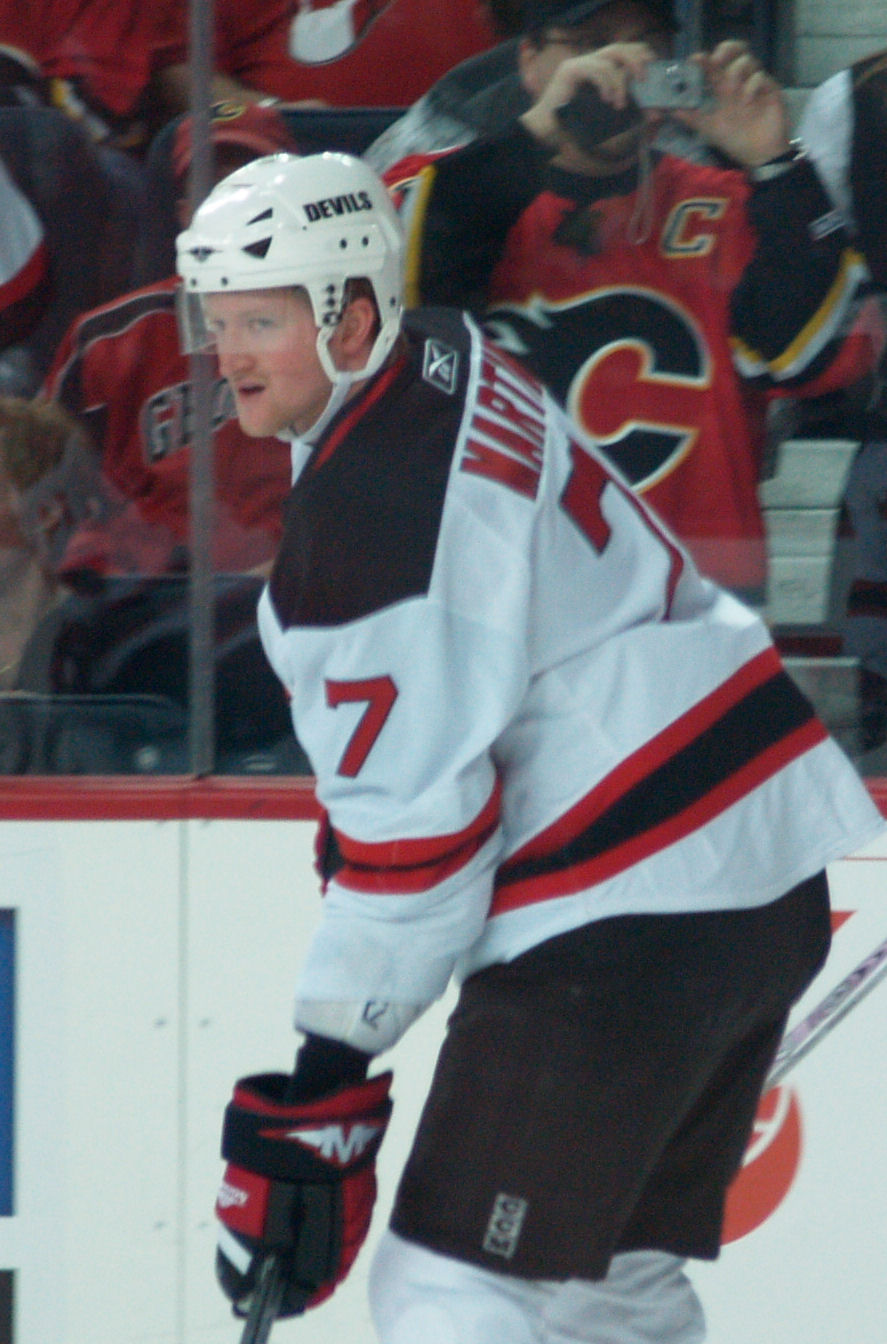
Paul Martin began his career with the Devils before signing with the Pittsburgh Penguins.

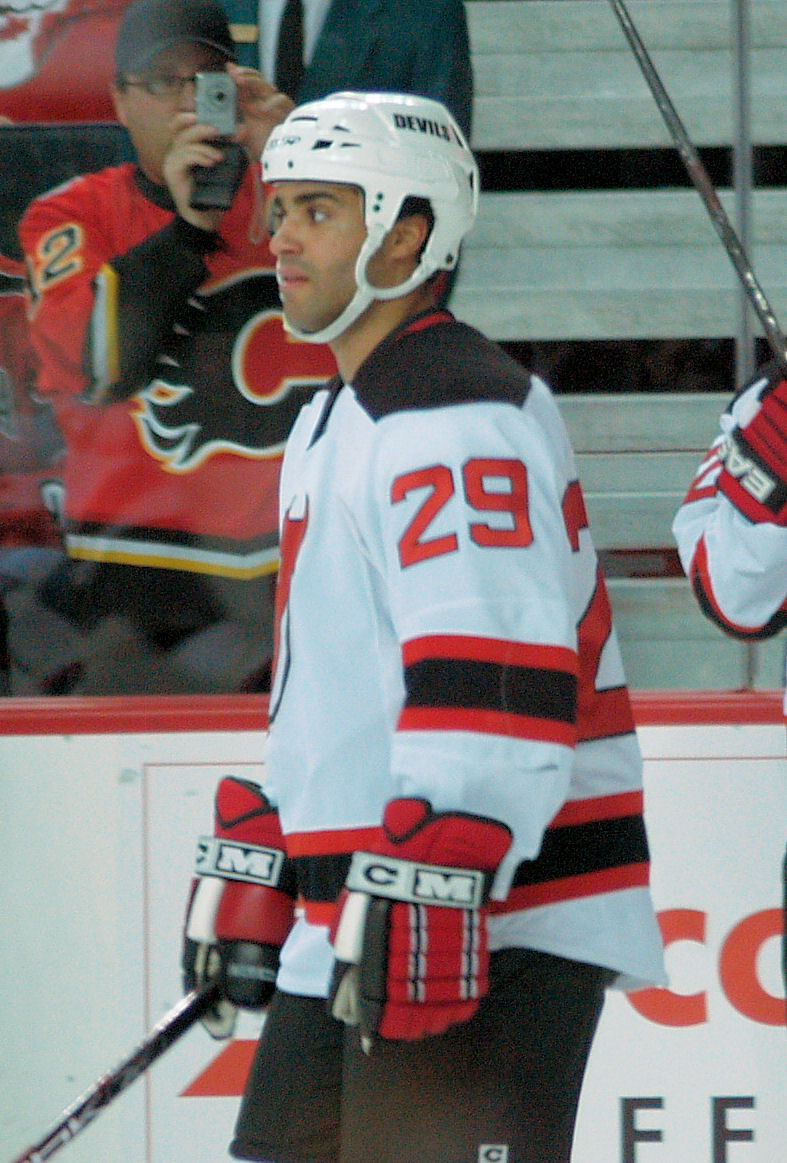
Johnny Oduya signed with the Devils as a free agent in 2006.

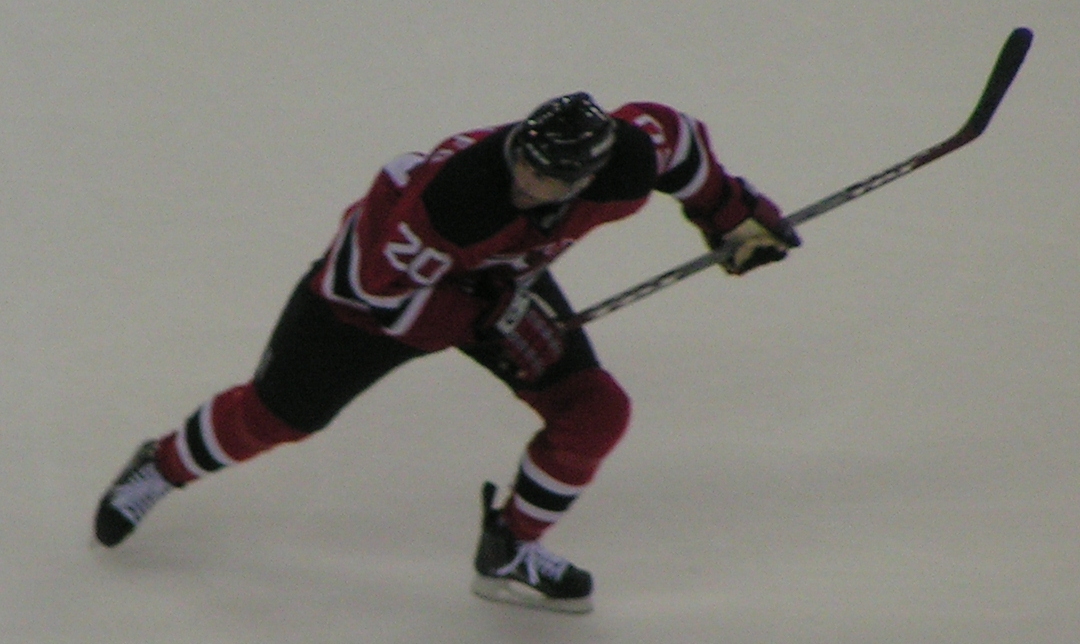
Jay Pandolfo was a Devil from 1996 to 2010.

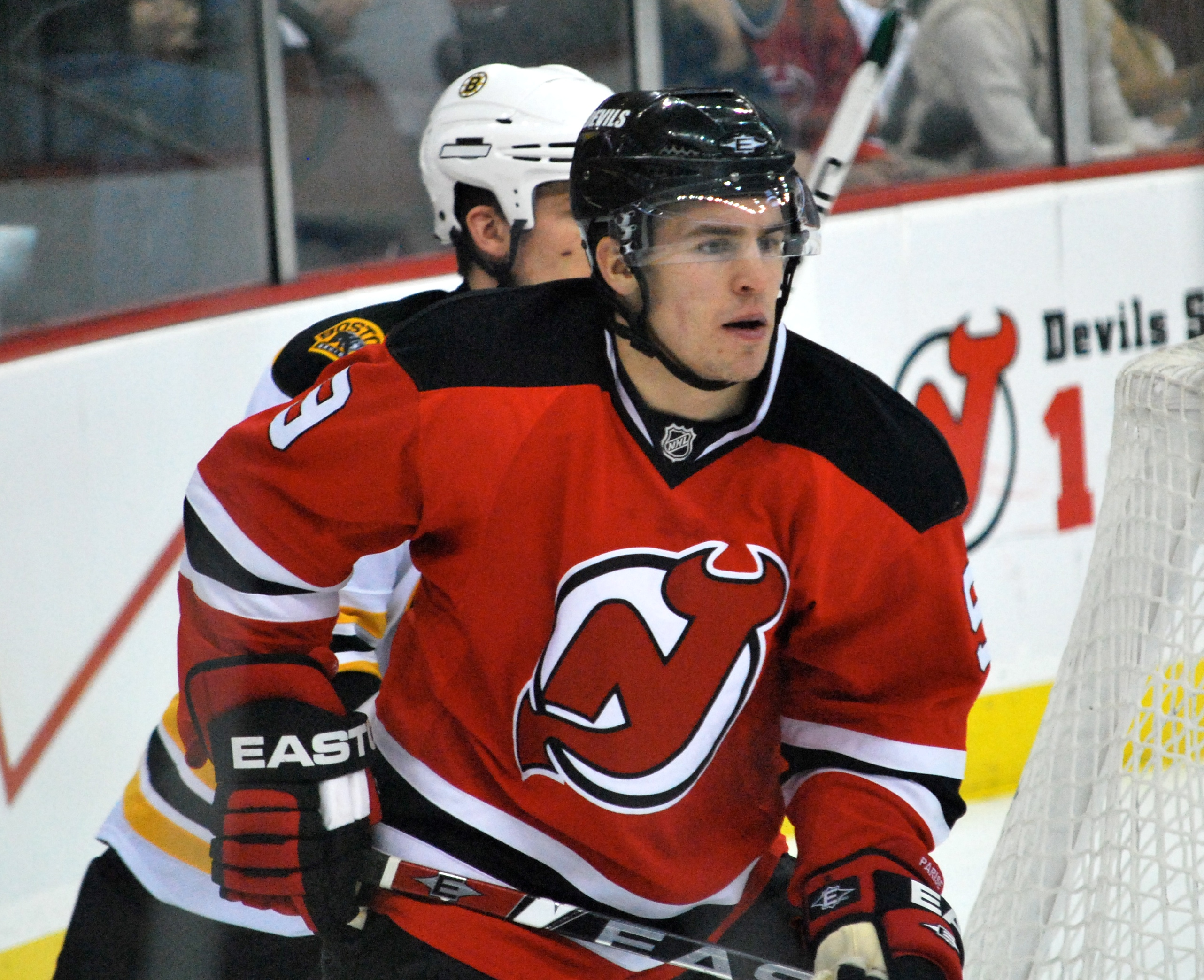
Zach Parise during his time with the New Jersey Devils.

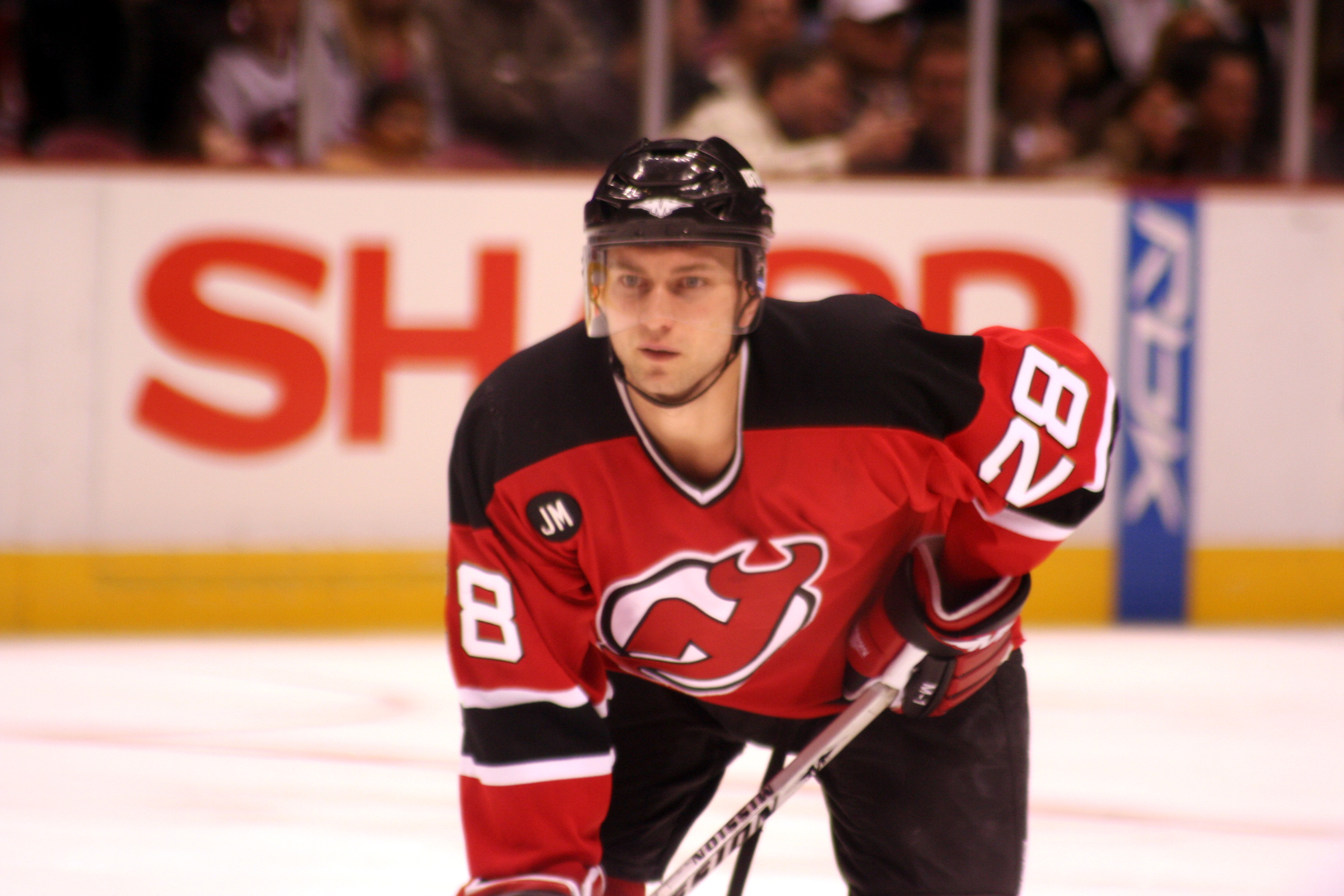
Defenseman Brian Rafalski spent seven years with the Devils before signing with Detroit.

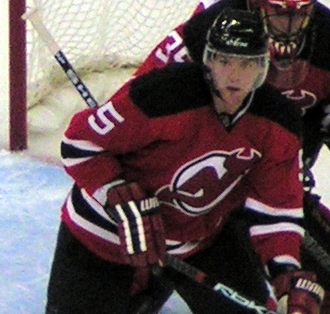
Colin White has won two Stanley Cups with the Devils.

Skater	Nat	Pos	Seasons	Regular season					Playoffs					Notes
Skater	Nat	Pos	Seasons	GP	G	A	P	PIM	GP	G	A	P	PIM	Notes
Adams, Greg	(Canada)	LW	1984–1987	186	67	78	145	63	—	—	—	—	—	
Agostino, Kenny	(United States)	LW	2018–2019	27	4	9	13	8	—	—	—	—	—	
Albelin, Tommy	(Sweden)	D	1988–1996; 2001–2006	539	27	125	152	251	77	7	15	22	22	SC 1995, 2003
Anderson, Joey	(United States)	RW	2018–2020	52	8	5	13	8	—	—	—	—	—	
Anderson, Matt	(United States)	RW	2012–2013	2	0	1	1	0	—	—	—	—	—	
Anderson, Perry	(Canada)	LW	1985–1991	208	24	33	57	551	14	0	1	1	123	
Andreychuk, Dave	(Canada)	LW	1995–1999	224	64	86	150	104	11	3	0	3	8	HHOF 2017
Antonovich, Mike	(United States)	C	1982–1984	68	10	12	22	27	—	—	—	—	—	
Arnott, Jason	(Canada)	C	1997–2002; 2010–2011	364	110	135	245	317	58	18	23	41	38	SC 2000
Asham, Arron	(Canada)	RW	2007–2008	77	6	4	10	84	5	0	1	1	2	
Ashton, Brent	(Canada)	LW	1982–1983	76	14	19	33	47	—	—	—	—	—	
Auvitu, Yohann	(France)	D	2016–2017	25	2	2	4	2	—	—	—	—	—	
Bahl, Kevin	(Canada)	D	2020–2024	148	4	21	25	127	11	0	1	1	31	
Barch, Krys	(Canada)	LW	2012–2013	22	0	0	0	44	—	—	—	—	—	
Barr, Dave	(Canada)	RW	1991–1993	103	12	20	32	93	5	1	0	1	6	
Bastian, Nathan	(Canada)	RW	2018–2025	264	32	34	66	159	17	1	1	2	16	
Bennett, Beau	(United States)	RW	2016–2017	65	8	11	19	20	—	—	—	—	—	
Berglund, Christian	(Sweden)	C	2001–2004	76	8	15	23	32	—	—	—	—	—	
Bernier, Steve	(Canada)	RW	2011–2015	224	28	37	65	94	24	2	5	7	27	
Bergfors, Nicklas	(Sweden)	RW	2007–2010	63	14	14	28	10	—	—	—	—	—	
Bertrand, Eric	(Canada)	LW	1999–2000	4	0	0	0	0	—	—	—	—	—	
Bicek, Jiri	(Slovakia)	RW	2000–2004	62	6	7	13	29	7	0	0	0	0	SC 2003
Bjugstad, Nick	(United States)	C	2025–2026	26	0	2	2	8	—	—	—	—	—	
Blandisi, Joseph	(Canada)	C	2015–2017	68	8	18	26	60	—	—	—	—	—	
Blomqvist, Timo	(Finland)	D	1986–1987	20	0	2	2	29	—	—	—	—	—	
Bodger, Doug	(Canada)	D	1997–1998	49	5	5	10	25	5	0	0	0	0	
Bombardir, Brad	(Canada)	D	1997–2000	131	5	13	18	30	6	0	0	0	0	SC 2000
Boqvist, Jesper	(Sweden)	C	2019–2023	189	28	27	55	22	6	0	0	0	0	
Boschman, Laurie	(Canada)	C	1990–1992	153	19	29	48	200	14	2	1	3	24	
Bouchard, Joel	(Canada)	D	2001–2002	1	0	1	1	0	—	—	—	—	—	
Boucher, Reid	(United States)	LW	2013–2017	82	11	18	29	12	—	—	—	—	—	
Boulton, Eric	(Canada)	LW	2011–2012	51	0	0	0	115	—	—	—	—	—	
Boumedienne, Josef	(Sweden)	D	2001–2002	1	1	0	1	2	—	—	—	—	—	
Bowers, Shane	(Canada)	C	2023–2025	12	0	0	0	0	—	—	—	—	—	
Boyle, Brian	(United States)	C	2017–2019	116	26	16	42	67	5	0	0	0	14	
Brady, Neil	(Canada)	C	1989–1992	29	2	4	6	17	—	—	—	—	—	
Bratt, Jesper	(Sweden)	W	2017–2026	634	172	346	518	102	18	2	7	9	4	
Brickley, Andy	(United States)	LW/C	1986–1988	96	19	26	45	22	4	0	1	1	4	
Bridgman, Mel	(Canada)	C	1983–1987	288	76	148	224	386	—	—	—	—	—	
Brookbank, Sheldon	(Canada)	D	2007–2009	59	0	8	8	88	—	—	—	—	—	
Brooke, Bob	(United States)	C	1989–1990	35	8	10	18	30	5	0	0	0	14	
Brooks, Alex	(United States)	D	2006–2007	19	0	1	1	4	—	—	—	—	—	
Broten, Aaron	(United States)	LW/C	1982–1990	581	147	283	430	361	20	5	11	16	20	
Broten, Neal	(United States)	C	1994–1997	88	15	37	52	34	20	7	12	19	6	SC 1995
Brown, Connor	(Canada)	RW	2025–2026	75	18	25	43	22	—	—	—	—	—	
Brown, Doug	(United States)	RW	1986–1993	350	68	80	148	84	32	7	4	11	10	
Brown, Sean	(Canada)	D	2003–2006	74	1	14	15	71	1	0	0	0	2	
Brule, Steve	(Canada)	RW	1999–2000	—	—	—	—	—	1	0	0	0	0	SC 2000
Brumwell, Murray	(Canada)	D	1982–1988	106	12	28	40	52	—	—	—	—	—	
Brunner, Damien	(Switzerland)	LW	2013–2014	60	11	14	25	26	—	—	—	—	—	
Brylin, Sergei	(Russia)	C	1994–2008	765	129	179	292	308	109	15	19	34	32	SC 1995, 2000, 2003
Butcher, Will	(United States)	D	2017–2021	238	14	92	106	34	5	1	3	4	0	
Butler, Bobby	(United States)	RW	2012–2013	14	1	1	2	0	—	—	—	—	—	
Cameron, Dave	(Canada)	C	1982–1984	102	14	16	30	135	—	—	—	—	—	
Cammalleri, Mike	(Canada)	LW	2014–2017	171	51	60	111	67	—	—	—	—	—	
Carlsson, Anders	(Sweden)	C	1986–1989	104	7	26	33	34	3	1	0	1	2	
Carpenter, Bobby	(United States)	C	1993–1999	353	35	71	106	156	60	4	13	17	40	SC 1995
Carrick, Connor	(United States)	D	2018–2021	60	3	12	15	28	—	—	—	—	—	
Carter, Ryan	(United States)	C	2011–2014	171	16	33	150	23	5	2	7	32		
Casey, Seamus	(United States)	D	2024–2026	16	4	4	8	0	1	0	0	0	0	
Chambers, Shawn	(United States)	D	1994–1997	158	8	43	51	43	30	5	11	16	8	SC 1995
Chernomaz, Rich	(Canada)	RW	1983–1987	35	8	7	15	12	—	—	—	—	—	
Cholowski, Dennis	(Canada)	D	2024–2026	23	0	2	2	2	2	0	0	0	0	
Chorske, Tom	(United States)	LW	1991–1995	244	57	57	114	105	45	5	11	16	8	SC 1995
Christian, Jeff	(Canada)	LW	1991–1992	2	0	0	0	2	—	—	—	—	—	
Cichocki, Chris	(United States)	RW	1987–1989	7	1	1	2	4	—	—	—	—	—	
Ciger, Zdeno	(Czechoslovakia) (Slovakia)	LW	1990–1993	92	18	30	48	20	13	2	6	8	4	
Cirella, Joe	(Canada)	D	1982–1989	438	43	147	190	888	19	0	7	7	49	
Claesson, Fredrik	(Sweden)	D	2019–2020	5	1	1	2	0	—	—	—	—	—	
Clarke, Graeme	(Canada)	RW	2023–2024	3	0	0	0	2	—	—	—	—	—	
Clarke, Noah	(United States)	LW	2007–2008	1	1	0	1	0	—	—	—	—	—	
Clarkson, David	(Canada)	RW	2006–2013	426	97	73	170	770	44	5	9	14	79	
Clowe, Ryane	(Canada)	LW	2013–2015	56	8	22	30	37	—	—	—	—	—	
Cole, Danton	(United States)	C/RW	1994–1995	12	1	2	3	8	1	0	0	0	0	SC 1995
Coleman, Blake	(United States)	C	2016–2020	237	57	37	94	188	5	2	0	2	4	
Commodore, Mike	(Canada)	D	2000–2002	57	1	5	6	44	—	—	—	—	—	
Conacher, Pat	(Canada)	LW	1985–1992	193	24	29	53	75	36	4	5	9	30	
Corkum, Bob	(United States)	C	2000–2001	17	3	1	4	4	12	1	2	3	0	
Corrente, Matthew	(Canada)	LW	2009–2011	34	0	6	6	68	2	0	0	0	2	
Cotter, Paul	(United States)	C	2024–2026	158	25	12	37	81	5	0	1	1	2	
Crookshank, Angus	(Canada)	LW	2025–2026	8	1	0	1	4	—	—	—	—	—	
Crowder, Troy	(Canada)	RW	1987–1991	69	6	3	9	205	3	0	0	0	22	
Dadonov, Evgenii	(Russia)	RW	2025–2026	24	1	0	1	2	—	—	—	—	—	
Dagenais, Pierre	(Canada)	RW	2000–2002	25	6	5	11	10	—	—	—	—	—	
D'Agostini, Matt	(Canada)	RW	2012–2013	13	2	2	4	6	—	—	—	—	—	
Daneyko, Ken	(Canada)	D	1983–2003	1283	36	142	178	2516	175	5	17	22	296	SC 1995, 2000, 2003; Ret #3
Daniels, Scott	(Canada)	LW	1997–1999	27	0	3	3	102	1	0	0	0	0	
Danton, Mike	(Canada)	C	2000–2003	19	2	0	2	41	—	—	—	—	—	
Darby, Craig	(United States)	C	2002–2004	5	0	1	1	0	—	—	—	—	—	
Davis, Patrick	(United States)	RW	2008–2010	9	1	0	1	0	—	—	—	—	—	
Davison, Rob	(Canada)	D	2009–2010	1	0	0	0	0	—	—	—	—	—	
Dea, Jean-Sebastien	(Canada)	C	2018–2019	20	3	2	5	6	—	—	—	—	—	
Dean, Kevin	(United States)	D	1994–1999	198	4	29	33	72	16	2	2	4	2	SC 1995
De Leo, Chase	(United States)	C	2021–2022	2	0	0	0	0	—	—	—	—	—	
DeSimone, Nick	(United States)	D	2023–2024	11	1	1	2	2	—	—	—	—	—	
Dietrich, Don	(Canada)	D	1985–1986	11	0	2	2	10	—	—	—	—	—	
Dillon, Brenden	(Canada)	D	2024–2026	164	5	26	31	156	1	0	0	0	0	
Dorion, Dan	(United States)	RW	1985–1988	4	1	1	2	2	—	—	—	—	—	
Dowd, Jim	(United States)	C	1991–1996; 2006–2007	121	14	27	41	37	41	4	7	11	20	SC 1995
Dowling, Justin	(Canada)	C	2023–2025	54	3	5	8	6	5	0	0	0	0	
Driver, Bruce	(Canada)	D	1983–1995	702	83	316	399	534	82	10	32	42	58	SC 1995
Dumoulin, Brian	(United States)	D	2024–2025	19	1	5	6	4	5	0	0	0	0	
Eckford, Tyler	(Canada)	D	2009–2011	7	0	1	1	4	—	—	—	—	—	
Elias, Patrik	(Czech Republic)	C/LW	1995–2016	1,240	408	617	1,025	549	162	45	80	125	89	SC 2000, 2003; Ret #26
Ellett, Dave	(United States)	D	1996–1997	20	2	5	7	6	10	0	3	3	10	
Emma, David	(United States)	RW	1992–1995	23	5	6	11	2	—	—	—	—	—	
Fahey, Jim	(United States)	D	2006–2007	3	0	1	1	2	—	—	—	—	—	
Farnham, Bobby	(United States)	LW	2015–2016	50	8	2	10	92	—	—	—	—	—	
Fayne, Mark	(United States)	D	2010–2014	242	13	35	48	99	24	0	3	3	6	
Fetisov, Viacheslav	(Soviet Union) (Russia)	D	1989–1995	341	19	111	130	410	38	1	7	8	45	HHOF 2001
Fiddler, Vernon	(Canada)	C	2016–2017	39	1	2	3	29	—	—	—	—	—	
Floyd, Larry	(Canada)	RW	1982–1984	12	2	3	5	9	—	—	—	—	—	
Foote, Callan	(Canada)	D	2023–2024	4	0	1	1	16	—	—	—	—	—	
Foote, Nolan	(United States)	LW	2020–2025	30	6	3	9	0	—	—	—	—	—	
Foster, Corey	(Canada)	D	1988–1989	2	0	0	0	0	—	—	—	—	—	
Foster, Dwight	(Canada)	RW	1982–1983	4	0	0	0	2	—	—	—	—	—	
Foster, Kurtis	(Canada)	D	2011–2012	28	3	9	12	23	—	—	—	—	—	
Fraser, Mark	(Canada)	D	2006–2012; 2014–2015	132	3	9	12	141	1	0	0	0	0	
Friesen, Jeff	(Canada)	LW	2002–2004	162	40	48	88	52	29	10	4	14	10	SC 2003
Gabriel, Kurtis	(Canada)	RW	2018–2019	22	2	2	4	59	—	—	—	—	—	
Gagne, Paul	(Canada)	LW	1982–1986	245	71	71	142	88	—	—	—	—	—	
Gardiner, Bruce	(Canada)	RW	2001–2002	7	2	1	3	2	—	—	—	—	—	
Gauthier, Frederik	(Canada)	C	2021–2022	8	0	0	0	0	—	—	—	—	—	
Gazdic, Luke	(Canada)	LW	2016–2017	11	0	0	0	12	—	—	—	—	—	
Geertsen, Mason	(Canada)	D	2021–2022	25	0	0	0	77	—	—	—	—	—	
Gelinas, Eric	(Canada)	D	2012–2016	156	14	40	54	80	—	—	—	—	—	
Gibbons, Brian	(United States)	C	2017–2018	59	12	14	26	20	2	0	0	0	0	
Gignac, Brandon	(Canada)	C	2018–2019	1	0	0	0	0	—	—	—	—	—	
Gilmour, Doug	(Canada)	C	1996–1998	83	20	55	75	90	16	5	6	11	18	HHOF 2011
Gionta, Brian	(United States)	RW	2001–2009	473	152	160	312	227	67	19	21	40	18	SC 2003
Gionta, Stephen	(United States)	RW	2010–2016	270	15	35	50	93	24	3	4	7	4	
Giroux, Ray	(Canada)	D	2002–2004	22	0	4	4	10	4	0	0	0	0	
Glass, Cody	(Canada)	C	2024–2026	84	21	12	33	43	5	0	0	0	2	
Glendening, Luke	(United States)	C	2025–2026	52	0	4	4	4	—	—	—	—	—	
Goc, Sascha	(Germany)	D	2000–2002	13	0	0	0	4	—	—	—	—	—	
Gomez, Scott	(United States)	C	1999–2007; 2014–2015	606	123	361	484	385	97	21	44	65	50	SC 2000, 2003
Grabner, Michael	(Austria)	RW	2017–2018	21	2	3	5	4	2	0	0	0	0	
Gragnani, Marc-Andre	(Canada)	D	2015–2016	4	0	0	0	2	—	—	—	—	—	
Graves, Ryan	(Canada)	D	2021–2023	153	14	40	54	52	10	0	1	1	4	
Greene, Andy	(United States)	D	2006–2020	923	49	197	246	259	50	3	6	9	22	
Greer, A. J.	(Canada)	LW	2020–2022	10	1	1	2	9	—	—	—	—	—	
Gritsyuk, Arseny	(Russia)	RW	2025–2026	66	13	18	31	26	—	—	—	—	—	
Gron, Stanislav	(Slovakia)	RW	2000–2001	1	0	0	0	0	—	—	—	—	—	
Gryba, Eric	(Canada)	D	2018–2019	10	0	0	0	10	—	—	—	—	—	
Guerin, Bill	(United States)	RW	1991–1998	380	108	106	214	469	56	11	11	22	91	SC 1995
Guolla, Steve	(Canada)	C	2002–2003	12	2	0	2	2	—	—	—	—	—	
Gusev, Nikita	(Russia)	LW	2019–2021	97	17	37	54	14	—	—	—	—	—	
Hale, David	(United States)	D	2003–2007	146	0	9	9	119	9	0	2	2	12	
Hall, Taylor	(Canada)	LW	2016–2020	211	76	132	208	102	5	2	4	6	6	
Halischuk, Matt	(Canada)	RW	2008–2010	21	1	2	3	2	—	—	—	—	—	
Halonen, Brian	(United States)	F	2023–2026	19	1	1	2	9	—	—	—	—	—	
Hameenaho, Lenni	(Finland)	RW	2025–2026	33	2	6	8	14	—	—	—	—	—	
Hamilton, Dougie	(Canada)	D	2021–2026	305	57	141	198	184	17	1	5	6	8	
Hankinson, Ben	(United States)	RW	1992–1995	25	3	1	4	39	—	—	—	—	—	
Hardman, Mike	(United States)	RW	2024–2025	2	0	1	1	0	—	—	—	—	—	
Harrold, Peter	(United States)	D	2011–2015	110	5	11	16	24	17	0	4	4	6	
Hatakka, Santeri	(Finland)	D	2023–2024	12	0	2	2	4	—	—	—	—	—	
Haula, Erik	(Finland)	LW	2022–2025	225	41	56	97	140	17	4	3	7	17	
Havelid, Niclas	(Sweden)	D	2008–2009	15	0	4	4	6	7	0	1	1	2	
Havlat, Martin	(Czech Republic)	LW	2014–2015	40	5	9	14	10	—	—	—	—	—	
Hayden, John	(United States)	RW	2019–2020	43	3	1	4	77	—	—	—	—	—	
Hayes, Jimmy	(United States)	RW	2017–2018	33	3	6	9	6	—	—	—	—	—	
Helgeson, Seth	(United States)	D	2014–2017	50	1	3	4	50	—	—	—	—	—	
Henrique, Adam	(Canada)	C	2010–2018	455	122	135	257	144	24	5	8	13	11	
Hepple, Alan	(Canada)	D	1983–1986	3	0	0	0	7	—	—	—	—	—	
Hiemer, Uli	(West Germany)	D	1984–1987	143	19	54	73	176	—	—	—	—	—	
Higgins, Tim	(Canada)	RW	1983–1986	167	46	56	102	104	—	—	—	—	—	
Hischier, Nico	(Switzerland)	C	2017–2026	609	199	289	488	154	22	6	6	12	2	
Hoffmeyer, Bob	(Canada)	D	1983–1985	95	5	18	23	126	—	—	—	—	—	
Holik, Bobby	(Czech Republic)	C	1992–2002; 2008–2009	786	202	270	472	863	124	20	37	57	107	SC 1995, 2000
Holtz, Alexander	(Sweden)	RW	2021–2024	110	19	15	34	24	—	—	—	—	—	
Housley, Phil	(United States)	D	1995–1996	22	1	15	16	8	—	—	—	—	—	HHOF 2015
Howatt, Garry	(Canada)	LW	1982–1984	44	1	4	5	128	—	—	—	—	—	
Hrabarenka, Raman	(Belarus)	D	2014–2015	1	0	0	0	0	—	—	—	—	—	
Hrdina, Jan	(Czech Republic)	C	2003–2004	13	1	6	7	10	5	2	0	2	2	
Hughes, Jack	(United States)	C	2019–2026	429	168	260	428	72	12	6	5	11	2	
Hughes, Luke	(United States)	D	2022–2026	223	23	105	128	76	4	0	2	2	0	
Hulse, Cale	(Canada)	D	1995–1996	8	0	0	0	15	—	—	—	—	—	
Huscroft, Jamie	(Canada)	D	1988–1991	65	2	5	7	227	8	0	0	0	22	
Hutchison, Dave	(Canada)	D	1982–1983	32	1	4	5	102	—	—	—	—	—	
Jacobs, Joshua	(United States)	D	2018–2020	3	0	0	0	2	—	—	—	—	—	
Jagr, Jaromir	(Czech Republic)	RW	2013–2015	139	35	51	96	88	—	—	—	—	—	
Janssen, Cam	(United States)	RW	2005–2008; 2011–2014	171	4	1	5	304	9	0	0	0	26	
Jaros, Christian	(Slovakia)	D	2021–2022	11	0	0	0	2	—	—	—	—	—	
Johannson, John	(United States)	C	1983–1984	5	0	0	0	0	—	—	—	—	—	
Johansson, Marcus	(Sweden)	F	2017–2019	77	17	24	41	22	3	0	0	0	0	
Johnson, Mark	(United States)	C	1985–1990	305	89	140	229	88	20	10	8	18	4	
Johnsson, Andreas	(Sweden)	LW	2020–2023	123	18	28	46	42	—	—	—	—	—	
Josefson, Jacob	(Sweden)	C	2010–2017	276	18	42	60	78	6	0	1	1	0	
Kamensky, Valeri	(Russia)	LW	2001–2002	30	4	8	12	18	2	0	0	0	0	
Kalinin, Sergey	(Russia)	C	2015–2017	121	10	9	19	48	—	—	—	—	—	
Kasatonov, Alexei	(Soviet Union) (Russia)	D	1989–1993	257	31	88	119	219	24	2	7	9	36	
Kelly, Steve	(Canada)	C	1999–2001	25	2	2	4	21	10	0	0	0	4	SC 2000
Kennedy, Tyler	(Canada)	C	2015–2016	50	3	13	16	14	—	—	—	—	—	
Kitchen, Mike	(Canada)	D	1982–1984	120	5	12	17	76	—	—	—	—	—	
Klee, Ken	(United States)	D	2005–2006	18	0	0	0	14	6	1	0	1	6	
Korn, Jim	(Canada)	D/LW	1987–1990	154	25	32	57	451	9	0	2	2	71	
Kostopoulos, Tom	(Canada)	RW	2012–2013	15	1	0	1	18	—	—	—	—	—	
Kovacevic, Johnathan	(Canada)	D	2024–2026	115	1	24	25	110	3	0	0	0	2	
Kovalchuk, Ilya	(Russia)	LW	2009–2013	222	89	112	201	87	28	10	15	25	12	
Kozlov, Viktor	(Russia)	C	2003–2006	80	14	17	31	18	5	0	0	0	0	
Kroupa, Vlastimil	(Czech Republic)	D	1997–1998	2	0	1	1	0	—	—	—	—	—	
Kulikov, Dmitri	(Russia)	D	2020–2021	38	0	2	2	26	—	—	—	—	—	
Kuokkanen, Janne	(Finland)	LW	2019–2022	108	14	28	42	24	—	—	—	—	—	
Kurvers, Tom	(United States)	D	1987–1990	131	21	79	100	84	19	6	9	15	38	
Laberge, Samuel	(Canada)	F	2023–2024	2	0	0	0	0	—	—	—	—	—	
Lachance, Shane	(United States)	LW	2025–2026	1	0	0	0	0	—	—	—	—	—	
LaCouture, Dan	(United States)	LW	2006–2007	6	0	0	0	7	—	—	—	—	—	
Lakovic, Sasha	(Canada)	RW	1997–1999	18	0	3	3	64	—	—	—	—	—	
Lammikko, Juho	(Finland)	RW	2025–2026	24	0	2	2	4	—	—	—	—	—	
Langdon, Darren	(Canada)	LW	2005–2006	14	0	1	1	22	—	—	—	—	—	
Langenbrunner, Jamie	(United States)	RW	2001–2011	564	142	243	385	415	68	18	32	50	59	SC 2003
Lappin, Nick	(United States)	RW	2016–2019	60	5	3	8	21	—	—	—	—	—	
Larionov, Igor	(Russia)	C	2003–2004	49	1	10	11	20	1	0	0	0	0	HHOF 2008
Larmer, Jeff	(Canada)	LW	1982–1984	105	27	37	64	29	—	—	—	—	—	
Larsson, Adam	(Sweden)	D	2011–2016	274	9	60	69	155	5	1	0	1	4	
Lazar, Curtis	(Canada)	C/RW	2022–2025	123	9	21	30	65	6	1	0	1	2	
Leach, Jay	(United States)	D	2008–2011	31	0	1	1	28	—	—	—	—	—	
Legare, Nathan	(Canada)	RW	2024–2026	4	0	0	0	0	—	—	—	—	—	
Lemieux, Claude	(Canada)	RW	1990–1995; 1999–2000	423	142	155	297	627	93	35	26	61	209	SC 1995, 2000
Lemieux, Jocelyn	(Canada)	LW	1995–1996	18	0	1	1	4	—	—	—	—	—	
Lenardon, Tim	(Canada)	C	1986–1987	7	1	1	2	0	—	—	—	—	—	
Letorneau-Leblond, Pierre-Luc	(Canada)	LW	2008–2011	37	0	3	3	91	5	0	0	0	10	
Lever, Don	(Canada)	LW	1982–1985	216	47	57	104	143	—	—	—	—	—	
Levo, Tapio	(Finland)	D	1982–1983	73	7	40	47	22	—	—	—	—	—	
Lewis, Dave	(Canada)	D	1983–1986	209	5	29	34	222	—	—	—	—	—	
Loiselle, Claude	(Canada)	C	1986–1989	217	40	56	96	467	20	4	6	10	52	
Loktionov, Andrei	(Russia)	C	2012–2014	76	12	12	24	16	—	—	—	—	—	
Lorimer, Bob	(Canada)	D	1982–1986	230	9	28	37	191	—	—	—	—	—	
Lovejoy, Ben	(United States)	D	2016–2019	190	5	17	22	97	5	1	0	1	2	
Ludvig, Jan	(Czechoslovakia)	RW	1982–1987	288	53	79	132	314	—	—	—	—	—	
Lukowich, Brad	(Canada)	D	2005–2007	93	5	15	20	44	20	0	1	1	6	
MacDermid, Kurtis	(Canada)	D	2023–2025	39	0	1	1	73	—	—	—	—	—	
MacEwen, Zack	(Canada)	C	2025–2026	3	0	0	0	0	—	—	—	—	—	
MacLean, John	(Canada)	C	1983–1998	934	347	354	701	1173	88	31	44	75	142	SC 1995
MacMillan, Bob	(Canada)	RW	1982–1984	142	36	52	88	31	—	—	—	—	—	
Madden, John	(Canada)	C	1998–2009	712	140	157	297	193	112	20	21	41	24	SC 2000, 2003
Madill, Jeff	(Canada)	RW	1990–1991	14	4	0	4	46	7	0	2	2	8	
Magnan, Olivier	(Canada)	D	2010–2011	18	0	0	0	4	—	—	—	—	—	
Mair, Adam	(Canada)	RW	2010–2011	65	1	3	4	45	—	—	—	—	—	
Malakhov, Vladimir	(Russia)	D	1999–2000; 2005–2006	46	5	9	14	45	23	1	4	5	18	SC 2000
Maley, David	(United States)	LW	1987–1992	280	32	50	82	683	26	3	1	4	105	
Malinowski, Merlin	(Canada)	C	1982–1983	5	3	2	5	0	—	—	—	—	—	
Malmivaara, Olli	(Finland)	D	2007–2008	2	0	0	0	0	—	—	—	—	—	
Mallette, Troy	(Canada)	LW	1991–1993	51	7	7	14	99	—	—	—	—	—	
Maltsev, Mikhail	(Russia)	LW	2020–2021	33	6	3	9	4	—	—	—	—	—	
Marcinyshyn, Dave	(Canada)	D	1990–1991	9	0	0	0	21	—	—	—	—	—	
Marini, Hector	(Canada)	RW	1982–1984	109	19	30	49	152	—	—	—	—	—	
Marino, John	(United States)	D	2022–2024	139	8	35	43	61	12	0	4	4	0	
Mark, Gord	(Canada)	D	1986–1988	55	3	7	10	109	—	—	—	—	—	
Maroon, Patrick	(United States)	LW	2017–2018	17	3	10	13	13	5	1	0	1	0	
Marshall, Grant	(Canada)	RW	2002–2006	151	17	27	44	144	31	6	3	9	16	SC 2003
Martin, Paul	(United States)	D	2003–2010	400	26	137	163	114	42	2	14	16	18	
Matteau, Stefan	(United States)	C	2012–2016	44	3	2	5	23	—	—	—	—	—	
Matvichuk, Richard	(Canada)	D	2005–2007	63	1	10	11	40	16	0	0	0	14	
Maxwell, Kevin	(Canada)	C	1983–1984	14	0	3	3	2	—	—	—	—	—	
McAdam, Gary	(Canada)	LW	1983–1985	42	10	7	17	15	—	—	—	—	—	
McAlpine, Chris	(United States)	D	1994–1995	24	0	3	3	17	—	—	—	—	—	SC 1995
McAmmond, Dean	(Canada)	C	2009–2010	62	8	9	17	40	5	0	0	0	4	
McGillis, Dan	(Canada)	D	2005–2006	27	0	6	6	36	—	—	—	—	—	
McKay, Randy	(Canada)	RW	1991–2002	760	151	171	322	1418	116	20	22	42	80	SC 1995, 2000
McKenzie, Jim	(Canada)	LW	2000–2003	196	9	15	24	330	22	0	0	0	18	SC 2003
McLaughlin, Marc	(United States)	F	2024–2026	9	0	1	1	0	—	—	—	—	—	
McLeod, Michael	(Canada)	C	2018–2024	287	29	56	85	164	12	2	4	6	15	
McNab, Peter	(Canada)	C	1985–1987	117	27	36	63	22	—	—	—	—	—	
McPhee, George	(Canada)	LW	1987–1989	6	3	1	4	10	—	—	—	—	—	
Meagher, Rick	(Canada)	C	1982–1985	180	40	48	88	49	—	—	—	—	—	
Meier, Timo	(Switzerland)	RW	2022–2026	247	87	76	163	143	16	4	4	8	28	
Mercer, Dawson	(Canada)	C	2021–2026	410	103	106	209	120	17	5	4	9	10	
Merkley, Nick	(Canada)	RW	2019–2021	31	3	9	12	9	—	—	—	—	—	
Merkosky, Glenn	(Canada)	C	1982–1984	39	5	10	15	20	—	—	—	—	—	
Mermis, Dakota	(United States)	D	2019–2020	10	1	3	4	4	—	—	—	—	—	
Merrill, Jon	(United States)	D	2013–2017	216	6	30	36	88	—	—	—	—	—	
Millen, Corey	(United States)	C	1993–1995	95	22	33	55	60	7	1	0	1	2	
Miller, Colin	(Canada)	D	2023–2024	41	4	4	8	24	—	—	—	—	—	
Miller, Jason	(Canada)	C	1990–1993	6	0	0	0	0	—	—	—	—	—	
Mills, Bradley	(Canada)	C	2010–2012	31	1	1	2	37	—	—	—	—	—	
Misyul, Daniil	(Belarus)	D	2024–2025	1	0	0	0	0	—	—	—	—	—	
Mitchell, Willie	(Canada)	D	1999–2001	18	0	2	2	29	—	—	—	—	—	
Modry, Jaroslav	(Czech Republic)	D	1993–1995	52	2	15	17	18	—	—	—	—	—	
Mogilny, Alexander	(Russia)	RW	1999–2001; 2005–2006	121	58	56	114	53	48	9	14	23	12	SC 2000
Moher, Mike	(Canada)	RW	1982–1983	9	0	1	1	28	—	—	—	—	—	
Moore, John	(United States)	D	2015–2018	217	23	36	59	114	5	0	1	1	12	
Morris, Jon	(Canada)	C	1988–1993	86	16	30	46	41	11	1	7	8	25	
Morrison, Brendan	(Canada)	C	1997–2000	131	23	58	81	26	10	0	3	3	0	
Mottau, Mike	(United States)	D	2007–2011	235	7	43	50	124	17	2	2	4	0	
Mozik, Vojtech	(Czech Republic)	D	2015–2016	7	0	0	0	4	—	—	—	—	—	
Mueller, Mirco	(Switzerland)	D	2017–2020	131	3	19	22	44	3	0	0	0	0	
Muir, Bryan	(Canada)	D	1998–1999	1	0	0	0	0	—	—	—	—	—	
Muller, Kirk	(Canada)	LW	1984–1991	556	185	335	520	572	33	5	13	18	58	
Mulvey, Grant	(Canada)	RW	1983–1984	12	1	2	3	19	—	—	—	—	—	
Murphy, Cory	(Canada)	D	2009–2010	12	2	1	3	2	—	—	—	—	—	
Murphy, Ryan	(Canada)	D	2018–2019	1	0	1	1	0	—	—	—	—	—	
Murray, Ryan	(Canada)	D	2020–2021	48	0	14	14	8	—	—	—	—	—	
Nemchinov, Sergei	(Russia)	C	1998–2002	196	27	43	70	50	53	4	5	9	6	SC 2000
Nemec, Simon	(Slovakia)	D	2023–2026	155	16	33	49	73	4	1	1	2	2	
Nicholls, Bernie	(Canada)	C	1992–1994	84	24	42	66	126	21	4	9	13	34	
Niedermayer, Rob	(Canada)	C	2009–2010	71	10	12	22	45	5	0	0	0	6	
Niedermayer, Scott	(Canada)	D	1991–2004	892	112	364	476	478	146	17	47	64	100	SC 1995, 2000, 2003; HHOF 2013; Ret #27
Nieuwendyk, Joe	(Canada)	C	2001–2003	94	19	37	56	60	22	3	7	10	4	SC 2003; HHOF 2011
Noesen, Stefan	(United States)	RW	2016–2019; 2024–2026	261	47	44	91	173	9	2	1	3	14	
Norwood, Lee	(United States)	D	1990–1991	28	3	2	5	87	4	0	0	0	18	
Nosek, Tomas	(Czech Republic)	C	2023–2024	36	2	4	6	6	—	—	—	—	—	
O'Brien, Jim	(United States)	C	2015–2016	4	0	0	0	2	—	—	—	—	—	
O'Callahan, Jack	(United States)	D	1987–1989	86	12	40	52	148	5	1	3	4	6	
O'Connor, Myles	(Canada)	D	1990–1993	38	3	3	6	63	—	—	—	—	—	
O'Donnell, Sean	(Canada)	D	2000–2001	17	0	1	1	33	23	1	2	3	41	
O'Neill, Brian	(United States)	C	2015–2016	22	0	2	2	8	—	—	—	—	—	
Odelein, Lyle	(Canada)	D	1996–2000	285	13	73	86	499	23	3	6	9	50	
Oduya, Johnny	(Sweden)	D	2006–2010	273	17	53	70	155	18	0	2	2	14	
Ojanen, Janne	(Finland)	C	1988–1993	98	21	23	44	28	3	0	2	2	0	
Okhotyuk, Nikita	(Russia)	D	2021–2023	15	2	1	3	4	—	—	—	—	—	
Olesz, Rostislav	(Czech Republic)	C/LW	2013–2014	10	0	2	2	0	—	—	—	—	—	
Oliwa, Kryzysztof	(Poland)	LW	1996–2000; 2005–2006	210	13	20	33	724	6	0	0	0	25	SC 2000
Palat, Ondrej	(Czech Republic)	LW	2022–2026	248	38	54	92	67	17	3	6	9	8	
Palmer, Rob	(Canada)	D	1982–1984	98	1	15	16	31	—	—	—	—	—	
Palmieri, Kyle	(United States)	RW	2015–2021	397	140	126	266	216	5	1	2	3	6	
Palmieri, Nick	(Canada)	RW	2009–2012	78	13	12	25	18	—	—	—	—	—	
Pandolfo, Jay	(United States)	LW	1996–2010	819	99	124	223	154	131	11	22	33	12	SC 2000, 2003
Parent, Xavier	(Canada)	F	2025–2026	5	0	0	0	2	—	—	—	—	—	
Parise, Zach	(United States)	LW	2005–2012	502	194	216	410	177	61	21	22	43	18	
Parenteau, P.A.	(Canada)	RW	2016–2017	59	13	14	27	35	—	—	—	—	—	
Pederson, Denis	(Canada)	C/RW	1995–2000	271	44	49	93	241	18	1	1	3	4	
Pellerin, Scott	(Canada)	LW	1992–1996	52	12	12	24	43	—	—	—	—	—	
Pelley, Rod	(Canada)	C	2006–2012	211	7	19	26	93	3	0	0	0	2	
Peluso, Mike	(United States)	D	1993–1997	192	9	35	44	619	37	2	2	4	66	SC 1995
Pesce, Brett	(United States)	D	2024–2026	109	4	20	24	35	5	0	3	3	2	
Persson, Ricard	(Sweden)	D	1995–1997	13	2	1	3	8	—	—	—	—	—	
Pesonen, Harri	(Finland)	C	2012–2013	4	0	0	0	2	—	—	—	—	—	
Peters, Andrew	(Canada)	RW	2009–2010	29	0	0	0	93	—	—	—	—	—	
Pichette, Dave	(Canada)	D	1984–1986	104	24	52	76	63	—	—	—	—	—	
Pierce, Randy	(Canada)	RW	1982–1983	3	0	0	0	10	—	—	—	—	—	
Pietila, Blake	(United States)	LW	2015–2019	38	1	3	4	12	—	—	—	—	—	
Pihlman, Tuomas	(Finland)	LW	2003–2007	15	1	1	1	12	—	—	—	—	—	
Pikkarainen, Ilkka	(Finland)	RW	2009–2010	31	1	3	4	10	—	—	—	—	—	
Poddubny, Walt	(Canada)	LW	1982–1992	54	9	18	27	44	—	—	—	—	—	
Ponikarovsky, Alexei	(Ukraine)	LW	2011–2013	63	9	16	25	16	24	1	8	9	12	
Porvari, Jukka	(Finland)	RW	1982–1983	8	1	3	4	4	—	—	—	—	—	
Preston, Rich	(Canada)	RW	1984–1986	151	31	37	68	91	—	—	—	—	—	
Prout, Dalton	(Canada)	D	2016–2018	18	0	3	3	43	—	—	—	—	—	
Quenneville, Joel	(Canada)	D	1982–1983	74	5	12	17	46	—	—	—	—	—	
Quenneville, John	(Canada)	C	2016–2019	33	2	3	5	6	—	—	—	—	—	
Quincy, Kyle	(Canada)	D	2016–2017	53	4	8	12	39	—	—	—	—	—	
Quint, Deron	(United States)	D	1999–2000	4	1	0	1	2	—	—	—	—	—	
Rachunek, Karel	(Czech Republic)	D	2007–2008	47	4	9	13	40	—	—	—	—	—	
Rafalski, Brian	(United States)	D	1997–2007	541	44	267	311	180	102	17	43	60	37	SC 2000, 2003
Rasmussen, Erik	(United States)	C	2003–2007	207	15	18	33	98	25	0	2	2	24	
Rheaume, Pascal	(Canada)	C	1996–1997; 2002–2003	35	5	1	6	12	24	1	2	3	13	SC 2003
Richer, Stephane	(Canada)	RW	1991–1996; 2001–2002	360	147	136	283	125	54	16	24	40	10	SC 1995
Richmond, Steve	(United States)	D	1986–1987	44	1	7	8	143	—	—	—	—	—	
Rolston, Brian	(United States)	C/RW	1994–2000; 2008–2011	557	130	151	281	161	41	11	4	15	18	SC 1995
Rooney, Kevin	(United States)	C	2016–2020	95	10	9	19	39	—	—	—	—	—	
Rooney, Steve	(United States)	LW	1988–1989	25	3	1	4	79	—	—	—	—	—	
Ruotsalainen, Reijo	(Finland)	D	1989–1990	31	2	5	7	14	—	—	—	—	—	
Rupp, Michael	(United States)	RW	2002–2004; 2006–2009	289	23	23	46	348	25	1	5	6	23	SC 2003
Russell, Phil	(Canada)	D	1983–1986	172	15	41	56	257	—	—	—	—	—	
Ruutu, Tuomo	(Finland)	LW	2013–2016	129	10	12	22	46	—	—	—	—	—	
Ryder, Michael	(Canada)	RW	2013–2015	129	24	29	53	48	—	—	—	—	—	
Ryznar, Jason	(United States)	LW	2005–2006	8	0	0	0	2	—	—	—	—	—	
Salmela, Anssi	(Finland)	D	2008–2011	74	2	11	13	20	—	—	—	—	—	
Salomonsson, Andreas	(Sweden)	RW	2001–2002	39	4	5	9	22	4	0	1	1	0	
Salvador, Bryce	(Canada)	D	2007–2015	339	8	39	47	283	38	5	10	15	38	
Santini, Steven	(United States)	D	2015–2019	114	5	16	21	53	—	—	—	—	—	
Schlemko, David	(Canada)	D	2015–2016	67	6	13	19	16	—	—	—	—	—	
Semak, Alexander	(Soviet Union) (Russia)	C	1991–1995	180	56	71	127	105	6	1	1	2	0	
Seney, Brett	(Canada)	LW	2018–2020	53	5	8	13	31	—	—	—	—	—	
Sestito, Tim	(United States)	C	2009–2015	100	0	8	8	55	1	0	0	0	0	
Severson, Damon	(Canada)	D	2014–2023	647	58	205	263	388	16	1	2	3	18	
Shanahan, Brendan	(Canada)	LW	1987–1991; 2008–2009	315	94	134	228	553	32	9	11	20	78	HHOF 2013
Sharangovich, Yegor	(Belarus)	C	2020–2023	205	53	53	106	43	3	0	0	0	0	
Sharifijanov, Vadim	(Russia)	LW	1996–2000	74	14	20	34	36	4	0	0	0	0	
Siegenthaler, Jonas	(Switzerland)	D	2020–2026	352	8	61	69	200	14	1	2	3	14	
Simmonds, Wayne	(Canada)	RW	2019–2020	61	8	16	24	64	—	—	—	—	—	
Simpson, Reid	(Canada)	LW	1994–1998	65	1	9	10	182	5	0	0	0	29	
Sislo, Mike	(United States)	RW	2013–2016	42	3	2	5	6	—	—	—	—	—	
Skalde, Jarrod	(Canada)	C	1990–1993	27	2	7	9	8	—	—	—	—	—	
Skoula, Martin	(Czech Republic)	D	2009–2010	19	0	3	3	4	4	0	0	0	0	
Skrlac, Rob	(Canada)	RW	2003–2004	8	1	0	1	22	—	—	—	—	—	
Smehlik, Richard	(Czech Republic)	D	2002–2003	82	6	7	13	70	5	0	0	0	2	SC 2003
Smith, Brendan	(Canada)	D	2022–2024	123	5	15	20	124	3	0	1	1	12	
Smith, Jason	(Canada)	D	1993–1997	164	3	8	11	167	6	0	0	0	7	
Smith, Ty	(Canada)	D	2020–2022	114	7	36	43	44	—	—	—	—	—	
Smith-Pelly, Devante	(Canada)	RW	2015–2017	71	12	10	22	20	—	—	—	—	—	
Souray, Sheldon	(Canada)	D	1997–2000	182	4	22	26	265	5	0	0	0	2	
Speers, Blake	(Canada)	C	2016–2017	3	0	0	0	0	—	—	—	—	—	
Sprong, Daniel	(Netherlands)	RW	2024–2025	11	0	2	2	0	1	0	0	0	0	
Stafford, Drew	(United States)	RW	2017–2019	116	13	15	28	28	2	0	0	0	10	
Starikov, Sergei	(Soviet Union)	D	1989–1990	16	0	1	1	8	—	—	—	—	—	
Stastny, Peter	(Czechoslovakia) (Slovakia)	C	1989–1993	217	64	109	173	133	25	9	15	24	27	HHOF 1998
Steckel, Dave	(United States)	C	2010–2011	18	1	0	1	2	—	—	—	—	—	
Stempniak, Lee	(United States)	RW	2015–2016	63	16	25	41	34	—	—	—	—	—	
Stevens, Scott	(Canada)	D	1991–2004	956	93	337	430	1007	133	17	45	62	186	SC 1995, 2000, 2003; HHOF 2007; Ret #4
Stevenson, Turner	(Canada)	RW	2000–2004	228	29	46	75	313	43	2	4	6	50	SC 2003
Stewart, Alan	(Canada)	LW	1985–1992	60	6	4	10	226	—	—	—	—	—	
Stollery, Karl	(Canada)	D	2016–2017	11	0	3	3	13	—	—	—	—	—	
Street, Ben	(Canada)	C	2019–2020	3	0	1	1	0	—	—	—	—	—	
Studenic, Marian	(Slovakia)	RW	2020–2022	25	2	1	3	4	—	—	—	—	—	
Subban, P. K.	(Canada)	D	2019–2022	189	17	42	59	187	—	—	—	—	—	
Suglobov, Aleksander	(Russia)	RW	2003–2006	2	1	0	1	0	—	—	—	—	—	
Sulliman, Doug	(Canada)	RW	1984–1988	267	86	78	164	60	9	0	3	3	2	
Sullivan, Brian	(United States)	RW	1992–1993	2	0	1	1	0	—	—	—	—	—	
Sullivan, Steve	(Canada)	RW	1995–1997; 2012–2013	58	15	21	36	26	—	—	—	—	—	
Sundstrom, Patrik	(Sweden)	C	1987–1992	305	86	160	246	168	26	8	16	24	16	
Sundstrom, Peter	(Sweden)	LW	1989–1990	21	1	2	3	4	—	—	—	—	—	
Sutton, Ken	(Canada)	D	1997–2001	77	2	9	11	45	6	0	0	0	13	SC 2000
Sykora, Petr	(Czech Republic)	RW	1995–2002; 2011–2012	527	166	228	394	222	81	24	27	51	34	SC 2000
Tallackson, Barry	(United States)	RW	2005–2009	20	1	1	2	2	3	0	0	0	0	
Tallinder, Henrik	(Sweden)	D	2010–2013	146	6	20	26	66	—	—	—	—	—	
Tambellini, Steve	(Canada)	C	1982–1983	73	25	18	43	14	—	—	—	—	—	
Tangradi, Eric	(United States)	C	2018–2019	6	0	1	1	0	—	—	—	—	—	
Taormina, Matt	(United States)	D	2010–2012	47	4	8	12	6	—	—	—	—	—	
Tatar, Tomas	(Slovakia)	LW	2021–2023; 2024–2025	232	42	53	95	72	16	1	0	1	6	
Tedenby, Mattias	(Sweden)	LW	2010–2014	120	10	20	30	42	—	—	—	—	—	
Tennyson, Matt	(United States)	D	2019–2021	41	1	5	6	8	—	—	—	—	—	
Thomas, Steve	(Canada)	LW	1995–1998	193	55	64	119	176	16	1	4	5	20	
Thompson, Paul	(United States)	RW	2015–2016	3	0	0	0	2	—	—	—	—	—	
Thompson, Tyce	(United States)	C	2020–2023	11	0	1	1	0	—	—	—	—	—	
Thomson, Jim	(Canada)	RW	1989–1990	3	0	0	0	31	—	—	—	—	—	
Tierney, Chris	(Canada)	C	2023–2024	52	4	8	12	21	—	—	—	—	—	
Tikkanen, Esa	(Finland)	LW	1995–1996	9	0	2	2	4	—	—	—	—	—	
Tlusty, Jiri	(Czech Republic)	C	2015–2016	30	2	2	4	6	—	—	—	—	—	
Todd, Kevin	(Canada)	C	1988–1993	112	26	47	73	85	8	3	2	5	14	
Toffoli, Tyler	(Canada)	C	2023–2024	61	26	18	44	12	—	—	—	—	—	
Tootoo, Jordin	(Canada)	RW	2014–2016	134	14	10	24	174	—	—	—	—	—	
Trottier, Rocky	(Canada)	RW	1983–1985	38	6	4	10	2	—	—	—	—	—	
Tsyplakov, Maxim	(Russia)	F	2025–2026	22	1	1	2	0	—	—	—	—	—	
Turgeon, Sylvain	(Canada)	LW	1989–1990	72	30	17	47	81	1	0	0	0	0	
Tverdovsky, Oleg	(Russia)	D	2002–2003	50	5	8	13	22	15	0	3	3	0	SC 2003
Urbom, Alexander	(Sweden)	D	2010–2013	14	2	0	2	9	—	—	—	—	—	
Vadnais, Carol	(Canada)	D	1982–1983	51	2	7	9	64	—	—	—	—	—	
Vasyunov, Alexander	(Russia)	LW	2010–2011	18	1	4	5	0	—	—	—	—	—	
Vatanen, Sami	(Finland)	D	2017–2021	184	14	60	74	94	4	1	0	1	0	
Vautour, Yvon	(Canada)	RW	1982–1984	94	7	11	18	214	—	—	—	—	—	
Veilleux, Stephane	(Canada)	LW	2011–2012	1	0	0	0	0	—	—	—	—	—	
Velischek, Randy	(Canada)	D	1985–1990	304	11	52	63	301	25	0	2	2	24	
Verbeek, Pat	(Canada)	RW	1982–1989	463	170	151	321	943	20	4	8	12	51	
Vesey, Jimmy	(United States)	LW	2021–2022	68	8	7	15	12	—	—	—	—	—	
Vilen, Topias	(Finland)	D	2025–2026	2	0	0	0	0	—	—	—	—	—	
Vilgrain, Claude	(Canada)	RW	1989–1993	81	20	31	51	78	11	1	1	2	17	
Vishnevski, Vitaly	(Russia)	D	2007–2008	69	2	5	7	50	3	0	0	0	2	
Volchenkov, Anton	(Russia)	D	2010–2014	222	3	29	32	127	24	1	1	2	10	
Vrana, Petr	(Czech Republic)	LW	2008–2009	16	1	0	1	2	—	—	—	—	—	
Walsh, Reilly	(United States)	D	2021–2022	1	0	1	1	0	—	—	—	—	—	
Walter, Ben	(Canada)	C	2009–2010	2	0	0	0	2	—	—	—	—	—	
Ward, Ed	(Canada)	RW	2000–2001	4	0	1	1	6	—	—	—	—	—	
Warsofsky, David	(United States)	D	2015–2016	10	0	1	1	2	—	—	—	—	—	
Weinrich, Eric	(United States)	D	1988–1992	173	13	66	79	114	20	2	7	9	27	
Wensink, John	(Canada)	LW	1982–1983	42	2	7	9	135	—	—	—	—	—	
White, Colin	(Canada)	D	1999–2011	743	20	105	125	848	111	2	14	16	125	SC 2000, 2003
White, Colton	(Canada)	D	2018–2022; 2025–2026	61	0	8	8	16	—	—	—	—	—	
Whitney, Joe	(United States)	LW	2013–2015	5	1	0	1	0	—	—	—	—	—	
Wiemer, Jason	(Canada)	LW	2005–2006	16	1	0	1	38	8	0	0	0	16	
Willman, Max	(United States)	C	2023–2024	18	3	1	4	2	—	—	—	—	—	
Wilson, Mitch	(Canada)	C	1984–1985	9	0	2	2	21	—	—	—	—	—	
Wolanin, Craig	(United States)	D	1984–1990	283	16	62	78	469	18	2	5	7	51	
Wood, Miles	(United States)	LW	2015–2023	402	78	70	148	427	13	2	0	2	28	
Yakovlev, Egor	(Russia)	D	2018–2019	25	2	5	7	6	—	—	—	—	—	
Ysebaert, Paul	(Canada)	C	1989–1991	21	5	9	14	6	—	—	—	—	—	
Zacha, Pavel	(Czech Republic)	C	2015–2022	386	69	110	179	110	5	0	0	0	6	
Zajac, Travis	(Canada)	C	2006–2021	1024	202	348	550	344	57	11	17	28	20	
Zalewski, Steven	(United States)	C	2011–2012	7	0	0	0	0	—	—	—	—	—	
Zelepukin, Valeri	(Soviet Union) (Russia)	LW	1991–1998	375	85	133	218	349	50	10	9	19	30	SC 1995
Zetterlund, Fabian	(Sweden)	W	2021–2023	59	9	19	28	6	—	—	—	—	—	
Zezel, Peter	(Canada)	C	1996–1998	25	0	6	6	4	2	0	0	0	10	
Zharkov, Vladimir	(Russia)	RW	2009–2012	82	2	12	14	10	—	—	—	—	—	
Zidlicky, Marek	(Czech Republic)	RW	2011–2015	214	21	59	80	122	24	1	8	9	22	
Zubrus, Dainius	(Lithuania)	C	2007–2015	554	87	138	225	322	41	4	9	13	44	
Zyuzin, Andrei	(Russia)	D	2001–2003	39	1	3	4	27	—	—	—	—	—	
