= List of Devils players =

List of Devils players may refer to:

- List of New Jersey Devils players
- List of players in the Cardiff Devils
