= Ken Daneyko =

Canadian ice hockey player (born 1964)

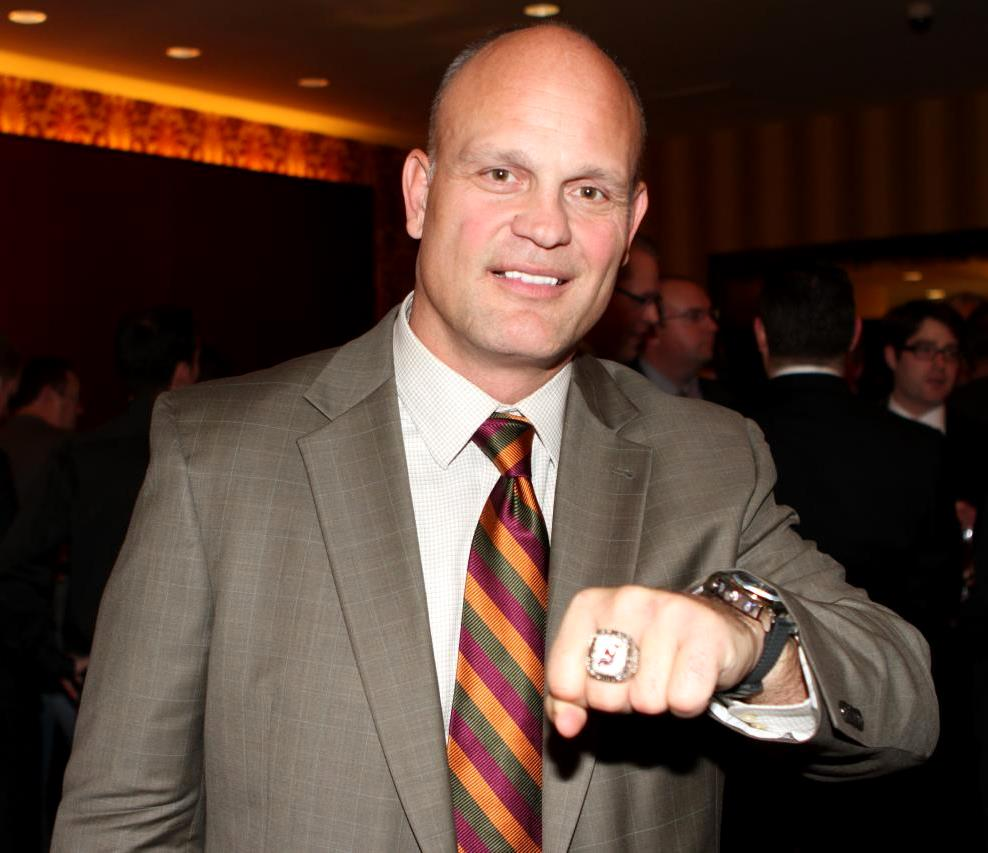
- Daneyko in 2011
- Born: April 17, 1964 (age 62) Windsor, Ontario, Canada
- Height: 6 ft 1 in (185 cm)
- Weight: 216 lb (98 kg; 15 st 6 lb)
- Position: Defence
- Shot: Left
- Played for: New Jersey Devils
- National team: Canada
- NHL draft: 18th overall, 1982; New Jersey Devils
- Playing career: 1983–2003

Kenneth Stephen Daneyko (born April 17, 1964) is a Canadian former professional ice hockey defenceman. He played his entire career with the New Jersey Devils of the National Hockey League (NHL), winning three Stanley Cup championships with the team. He has been nicknamed "Mr. Devil" by Devils fans, as he currently holds both the franchise record for games played as a Devil with 1,283 games and in penalty minutes with 2,516. Daneyko now provides colour analysis alongside Don La Greca during broadcasts of Devils games on MSG Sportsnet.

== Early years ==
Daneyko was born on April 17, 1964, in Windsor, Ontario, and spent his first seven years there. He was the youngest of four children born into their immigrant family. His parents immigrated from Ukraine. His family moved from Windsor to Edmonton, Alberta when he was seven years old. In Edmonton, he grew up alongside future NHLer Mark Messier, who, despite being four years older than him, he described as "very influential" on his career.

== Playing career ==
=== Amateur ===
Daneyko played Bantam AA hockey for the Great Falls Americans before being encouraged to leave Edmonton to play Junior hockey at the age of 15. He left with his father's permission without telling his mother, as she had opposed the move. Daneyko spent one season with the Yorkton Terriers of the Saskatchewan Junior Hockey League and scored one goal and 20 assists in his rookie season. After his one-year stint with the Terriers, Daneyko joined the Spokane Flyers in the Western Hockey League. He played 88 games for the Flyers before joining the Seattle Breakers in December 1981 when the WHL suspended the Spokane franchise. He began to gain attention from National Hockey League (NHL) scouts while in Seattle, which rose his rankings for the 1982 NHL entry draft. While he was originally ranked 67th among all draft-eligible players in February 1982, he finished the season as one of the best prospects in junior hockey. Daneyko was subsequently drafted in the first round, 18th overall, by the New Jersey Devils in the 1982 NHL entry draft.

=== Professional ===
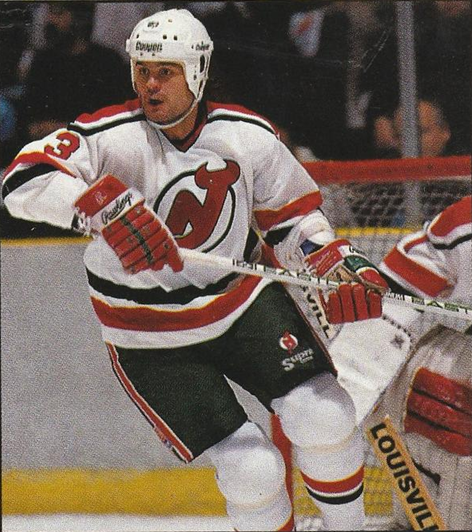
1988 Carretta card of Daneyko for New Jersey Devils

Daneyko participated in the Devils' 1982 training camp before being returned to the Seattle Breakers. He scored 17 goals and 43 assists for the Breakers in the 1982-83 season. Although his points total pleased the Devils' coaching staff, they were concerned about the quality of coaching he would receive if he returned to the Breakers for his final year of junior hockey. Their concerns were so serious that Devils General Manager and coach Billy MacMillan considered keeping Daneyko at the NHL level rather than returning him. However, following his trade to the Kamloops Junior Oilers of the WHL, the Devils felt comfortable reassigning him if necessary. At the Devils 1983 training camp, Daneyko was paired with veteran defenceman Phil Russell and they remained together to start the 1983–84 season. He subsequently made his NHL debut on October 6 against the New York Rangers, and scored his first NHL goal on October 30 against the Pittsburgh Penguins. By the end of October, he ranked sixth in rookie scoring with five points through 11 games. However, he fractured his fibula during a game against the Hartford Whalers in early November and missed over two months of game play. Once he recovered in February, he was reassigned to the Kamloops Junior Oilers of the WHL for the remainder of the season. Upon rejoining the Kamloops Junior Oilers, Daneyko helped the team qualify for the 1984 Memorial Cup.

Daneyko was reassigned to the Devils American Hockey League (AHL) affiliate, the Maine Mariners, to start the 1984-85 season. He later described his season in Maine as beneficial for his overall development, stating: "I learned a lot about the mental aspects of the game and kept developing physically. I play a physical game and I sometimes got caught out of position a lot. Now I know they want me to move the puck as quickly as possible."

During the 1985 offseason, Daneyko joined Paul Messier in West Germany and spent a month attending the training camp of Adler Mannheim. He also participated in four exhibition games with Mannheim. However, as he did not receive permission to do so from the Devils organisation or the NHL, he was suspended for one game and fined $500. After serving his suspension, Daneyko played in only one game for the Devils before being demoted to the AHL on November 9. Daneyko finished the regular season with no goals and 10 assists. He signed a two-year contract extension with the Devils on June 6, 1986.

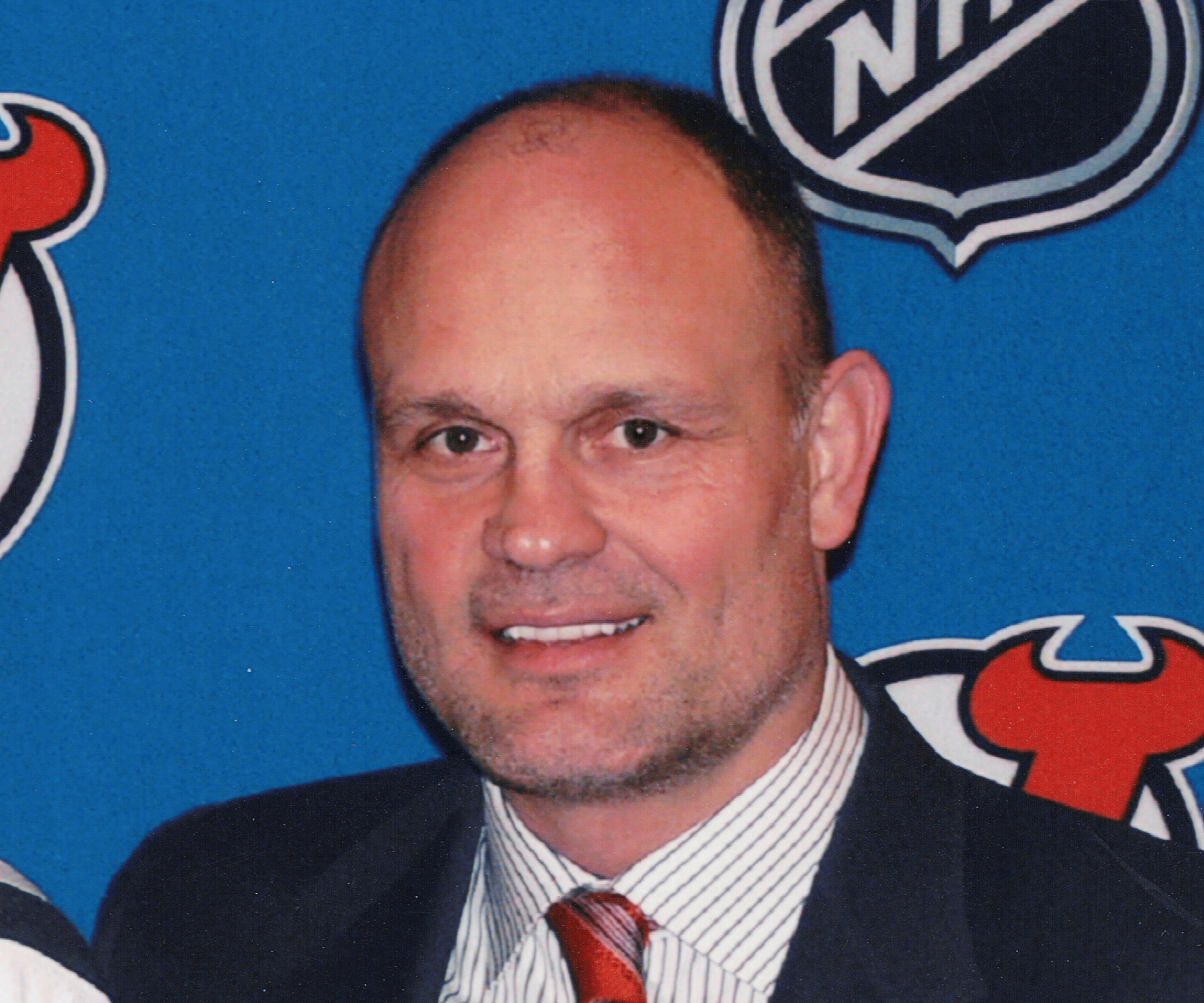
Daneyko circa 2005/2006

On March 29, 1994, Daneyko's ironman streak ended due to a shoulder injury. At the time of the injury, Daneyko held the record as the NHL's longest active ironman with 388 consecutive games.

Daneyko played in his 800th career NHL game on October 18, 1996, against the Hartford Whalers. This moved him into second place on the Devils' all-time games played list, behind John MacLean.

While Daneyko began the 1997–98 season with the Devils, his play was affected by personal issues. After missing three games due to these issues, Daneyko went public with his alcoholism problem in early November. He became the first player to voluntarily enter the NHL's voluntary Substance Abuse and Behavioral Health program and subsequently missed 45 games. Although he had been released from the Hazelden Betty Ford Foundation Clinic at the end of December, Daneyko trained privately with the team's trainers until February 3. He officially returned to the Devils lineup on February 25 for their game against the Florida Panthers. Daneyko won the Bill Masterton Trophy in 2000 in recognition of his "perseverance, sportsmanship and dedication to hockey."

Along with Scott Stevens, he was part of a Devils defensive core that won the Stanley Cup three times, in 1995, 2000 and 2003. From the team's first playoff game while in New Jersey, in 1988, Daneyko played in every playoff game until game four of the 2003 quarterfinals. He also was scratched in the first six games of the 2003 finals, but, looking for a spark, coach Pat Burns inserted Daneyko into the lineup for game seven, replacing Oleg Tverdovsky. Daneyko took the ice for the final shift of the Devils' game seven victory over the Mighty Ducks of Anaheim, which clinched their third Stanley Cup victory, in 2003.

== Post-playing career ==
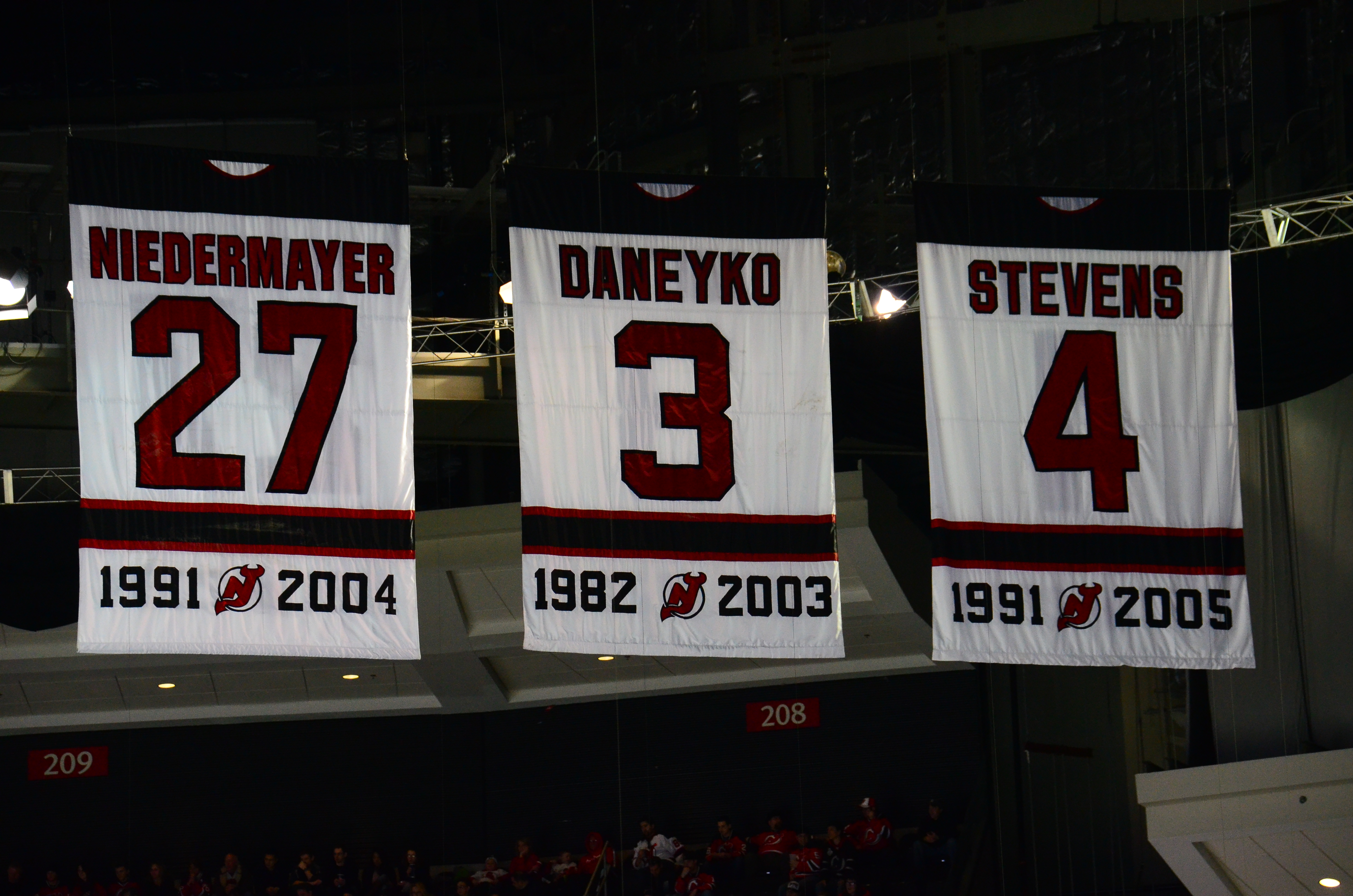
Daneyko's No. 3 hanging in between Scott Niedermayer's No. 27 and Scott Stevens' No. 4 at the Prudential Center

Following his retirement, Daneyko joined the Devils' broadcasts on MSGSN as a studio analyst. He spent eight years in this role before being promoted to the Devils' in-game analyst in September 2014.

=== Legacy and honours ===
The Devils retired his uniform number on March 24, 2006. He was the second Devil to receive the honour, after Scott Stevens, although both were retired in the same year.

In October 2009, Daneyko began competing as a pairs figure skater on the Canadian Broadcasting Corporation reality show Battle of the Blades. In 2010, Daneyko portrayed himself in the short film Ice Hockey, written and directed by Larry Cohen. The film also featured Randy Velischek.

In 2016, Daneyko was inducted into the Ukrainian Sports Hall of Fame.

== Personal life ==
Daneyko has two children; a daughter and a son.

== Career statistics ==
=== Regular season and playoffs ===
			Regular season					Playoffs
Season	Team	League	GP	G	A	Pts	PIM	GP	G	A	Pts	PIM
1979–80	Yorkton Terriers	SJHL	60	2	24	26	102	—	—	—	—	—
1979–80	Great Falls Americans	WHL	1	0	0	0	0	—	—	—	—	—
1980–81	St. Albert Saints	AJHL	1	0	0	0	4	—	—	—	—	—
1980–81	Spokane Flyers	WHL	62	6	13	19	140	4	0	0	0	0
1981–82	St. Albert Saints	AJHL	1	0	2	2	2	—	—	—	—	—
1981–82	Spokane Flyers	WHL	26	1	11	12	147	—	—	—	—	—
1981–82	Seattle Breakers	WHL	38	1	22	23	151	10	1	9	10	42
1982–83	Seattle Breakers	WHL	69	17	43	60	150	4	1	3	4	14
1983–84	Kamloops Junior Oilers	WHL	19	6	28	34	52	17	4	9	13	28
1983–84	New Jersey Devils	NHL	11	1	4	5	17	—	—	—	—	—
1983–84	Kamloops Junior Oilers	MC	—	—	—	—	—	4	2	2	4	10
1984–85	Maine Mariners	AHL	80	4	9	13	206	11	1	3	4	36
1984–85	New Jersey Devils	NHL	1	0	0	0	10	—	—	—	—	—
1985–86	Maine Mariners	AHL	21	3	2	5	75	—	—	—	—	—
1985–86	New Jersey Devils	NHL	44	0	10	10	100	—	—	—	—	—
1986–87	New Jersey Devils	NHL	79	2	12	14	183	—	—	—	—	—
1987–88	New Jersey Devils	NHL	80	5	7	12	239	20	1	6	7	83
1988–89	New Jersey Devils	NHL	80	5	5	10	283	—	—	—	—	—
1989–90	New Jersey Devils	NHL	74	6	15	21	216	6	2	0	2	21
1990–91	New Jersey Devils	NHL	80	4	16	20	249	7	0	1	1	10
1991–92	New Jersey Devils	NHL	80	1	7	8	170	7	0	3	3	16
1992–93	New Jersey Devils	NHL	84	2	11	13	236	5	0	0	0	8
1993–94	New Jersey Devils	NHL	78	1	9	10	176	20	0	1	1	45
1994–95	New Jersey Devils	NHL	25	1	2	3	54	20	1	0	1	22
1995–96	New Jersey Devils	NHL	80	2	4	6	115	—	—	—	—	—
1996–97	New Jersey Devils	NHL	77	2	7	9	70	10	0	0	0	28
1997–98	New Jersey Devils	NHL	37	0	1	1	57	6	0	1	1	10
1998–99	New Jersey Devils	NHL	82	2	9	11	63	7	0	0	0	8
1999–2000	New Jersey Devils	NHL	78	0	6	6	98	23	1	2	3	14
2000–01	New Jersey Devils	NHL	77	0	4	4	87	25	0	3	3	21
2001–02	New Jersey Devils	NHL	67	0	6	6	60	6	0	0	0	8
2002–03	New Jersey Devils	NHL	69	2	7	9	33	13	0	0	0	2
NHL totals			1,283	36	142	178	2,516	175	5	17	22	296

=== International ===
Year	Team	Event	GP	G	A	Pts	PIM
1986	Canada	WC	7	0	0	0	0
1989	Canada	WC	8	0	0	0	4
Senior totals			15	0	0	0	4

== Awards and honours ==
Award	Year	Ref
National Hockey League
Bill Masterton Memorial Trophy	2000	

== See also ==
- List of New Jersey Devils award winners
- List of New Jersey Devils records
- List of New Jersey Devils broadcasters
- List of New Jersey Devils draft picks
- List of New Jersey Devils players
- List of NHL players with 1,000 games played
- List of NHL players with 2,000 career penalty minutes
- List of NHL players who spent their entire career with one franchise

Preceded by Rocky Trottier	New Jersey Devils first-round draft pick 1982	Succeeded by John MacLean
Preceded by John Cullen	Bill Masterton Trophy; 2000	Succeeded by Adam Graves
