= Rocky Trottier =

Canadian ice hockey player

- Born: April 11, 1964 (age 62) Climax, Saskatchewan, Canada
- Height: 5 ft 11 in (180 cm)
- Weight: 185 lb (84 kg; 13 st 3 lb)
- Position: Centre
- Shot: Left
- Played for: New Jersey Devils
- NHL draft: 8th overall, 1982; New Jersey Devils
- Playing career: 1983–1990

Rocky Trottier (born April 11, 1964) is a Canadian former professional ice hockey player who played 38 games in the National Hockey League (NHL) over two seasons with the New Jersey Devils.

Trottier, whose brother Bryan was part of the New York Islanders' dynasty of the early 1980s, was drafted by the then-unnamed New Jersey team with their first pick in the 1982 NHL entry draft; the former Colorado Rockies franchise had just relocated from Denver and had not yet announced a name. He was one of two New Jersey first-round picks in that draft; the other, Ken Daneyko, went on to play for the Devils for twenty seasons.

== Professional career ==
Trottier made his NHL debut in 1983–84 season, appearing in five games and compiling one goal and one assist. He began the 1984–85 season with the Maine Mariners, of the American Hockey League (AHL), before being recalled by New Jersey. On December 17, 1984, during the Devils' 5–2 win at Brendan Byrne Arena, a penalty shot was awarded after Wayne Gretzky threw his stick in an attempt to stop Trottier's shot. This was the first penalty shot attempt and goal in the franchise history, coming against Edmonton Oilers goaltender Andy Moog. After a less-than-spectacular season, Trottier was sent back to Maine where he played two seasons before being released. Upon his release, Trottier signed a contract to play in the 2nd Bundesliga with EV Füssen. After one season in Germany, Trottier returned to the AHL to play with the Hershey Bears. At the end of the 1989–90 season, he retired from professional hockey.

== Career statistics ==
			Regular season					Playoffs
Season	Team	League	GP	G	A	Pts	PIM	GP	G	A	Pts	PIM
1980–81	Saskatoon Blades	WHL	34	9	15	24	26	—	—	—	—	—
1980–81	Billings Bighorns	WHL	28	2	11	13	41	5	0	0	0	0
1981–82	Billings Bighorns	WHL	28	13	21	34	36	—	—	—	—	—
1982–83	Nanaimo Islanders	WHL	34	13	22	35	12	—	—	—	—	—
1982–83	Medicine Hat Tigers	WHL	20	5	9	14	11	5	0	2	2	2
1982–83	Wichita Wind	CHL	2	0	1	1	0	—	—	—	—	—
1983–84	Medicine Hat Tigers	WHL	65	34	50	84	41	14	5	10	15	13
1983–84	New Jersey Devils	NHL	5	1	1	2	0	—	—	—	—	—
1984–85	Maine Mariners	AHL	34	17	16	33	4	10	2	0	2	15
1984–85	New Jersey Devils	NHL	33	5	3	8	2	—	—	—	—	—
1985–86	Maine Mariners	AHL	66	12	19	31	42	—	—	—	—	—
1986–87	Maine Mariners	AHL	77	9	14	23	41	—	—	—	—	—
1987–88	Rögle BK	SWE.2	21	8	5	13	10	2	0	0	0	0
1988–89	EV Füssen	DEU.2	33	23	31	54	22	—	—	—	—	—
1989–90	Hershey Bears	AHL	49	15	13	28	18	—	—	—	—	—
NHL totals			38	6	4	10	2	—	—	—	—	—
AHL totals			226	53	62	115	105	10	2	0	2	15

Preceded by Joe Cirella	New Jersey Devils first-round draft pick 1982	Succeeded by Ken Daneyko
