= Jesper Bratt =

Swedish ice hockey player (born 1998)

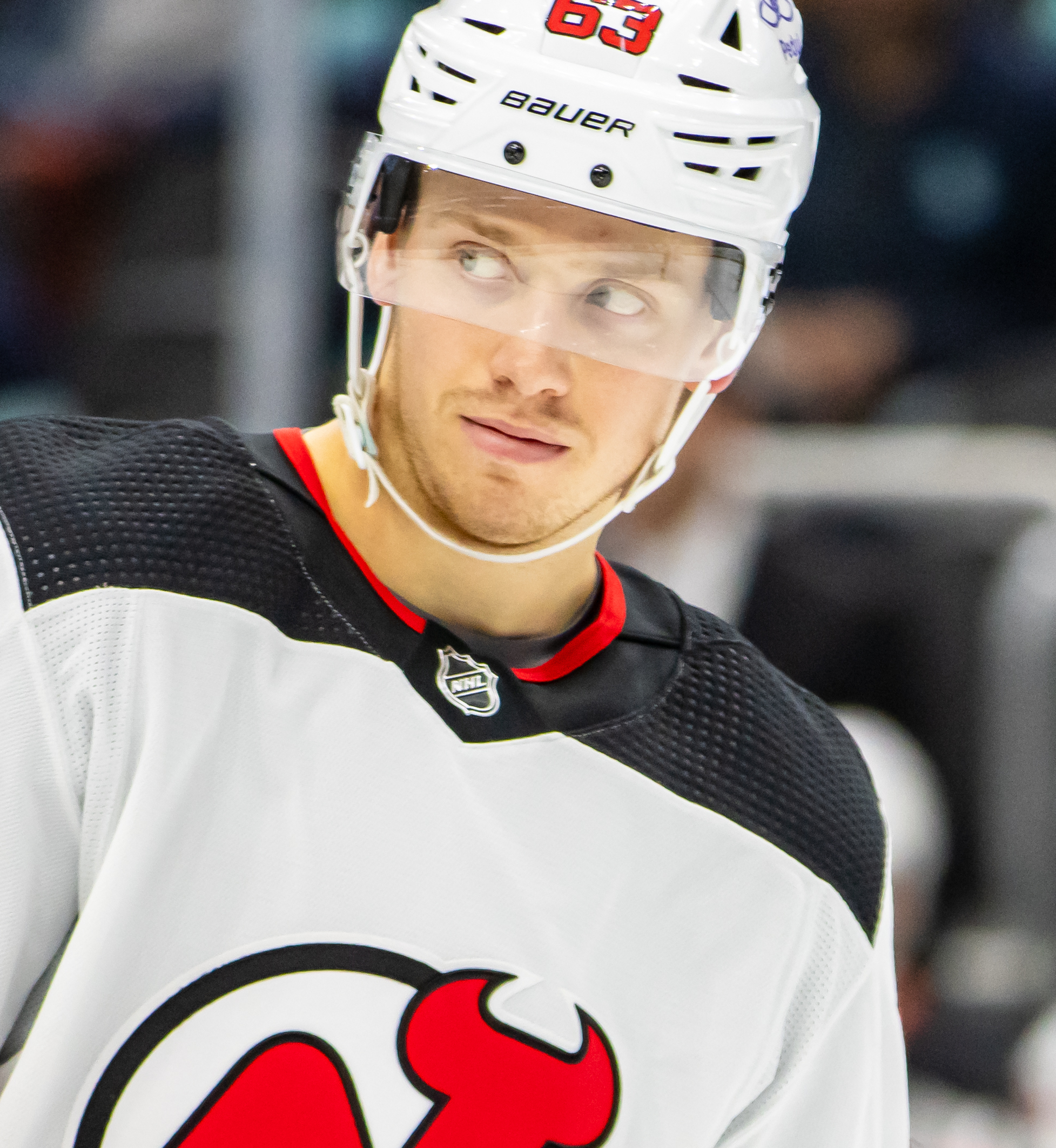
- Bratt with the New Jersey Devils in 2023
- Born: 30 July 1998 (age 28) Stockholm, Sweden
- Height: 5 ft 10 in (178 cm)
- Weight: 175 lb (79 kg; 12 st 7 lb)
- Position: Winger
- Shoots: Left
- NHL team: New Jersey Devils
- National team: Sweden
- NHL draft: 162nd overall, 2016; New Jersey Devils
- Playing career: 2015–present

Ulf Jesper Bratt (born 30 July 1998) is a Swedish professional ice hockey player who is a winger and alternate captain for the New Jersey Devils of the National Hockey League (NHL). Bratt was selected by the Devils in the sixth round, 162nd overall, of the 2016 NHL entry draft, and made his NHL debut the following year. Bratt has also represented the Swedish national team in the international competitions at both the junior and senior level.

== Playing career ==
Bratt was drafted by the New Jersey Devils with the 162nd pick in the sixth round of the 2016 NHL entry draft after playing 48 games with AIK in HockeyAllsvenskan, scoring 17 points. Bratt signed a three-year, entry-level contract with the Devils on 13 May 2017, after impressing Devils general manager Ray Shero during the 2017 under-20 Summer Showcase in Plymouth, Michigan. Bratt was expected to be loaned by the Devils to the London Knights of the Ontario Hockey League (OHL), who owned his North American junior rights after selecting him in the 2017 CHL Import Draft. Bratt committed to play for the Knights in August 2017 and played in one preseason game; however, he continued to impress during Devils training camp and made their opening night roster for the 2017–18 NHL season and never played a regular season game for the Knights.

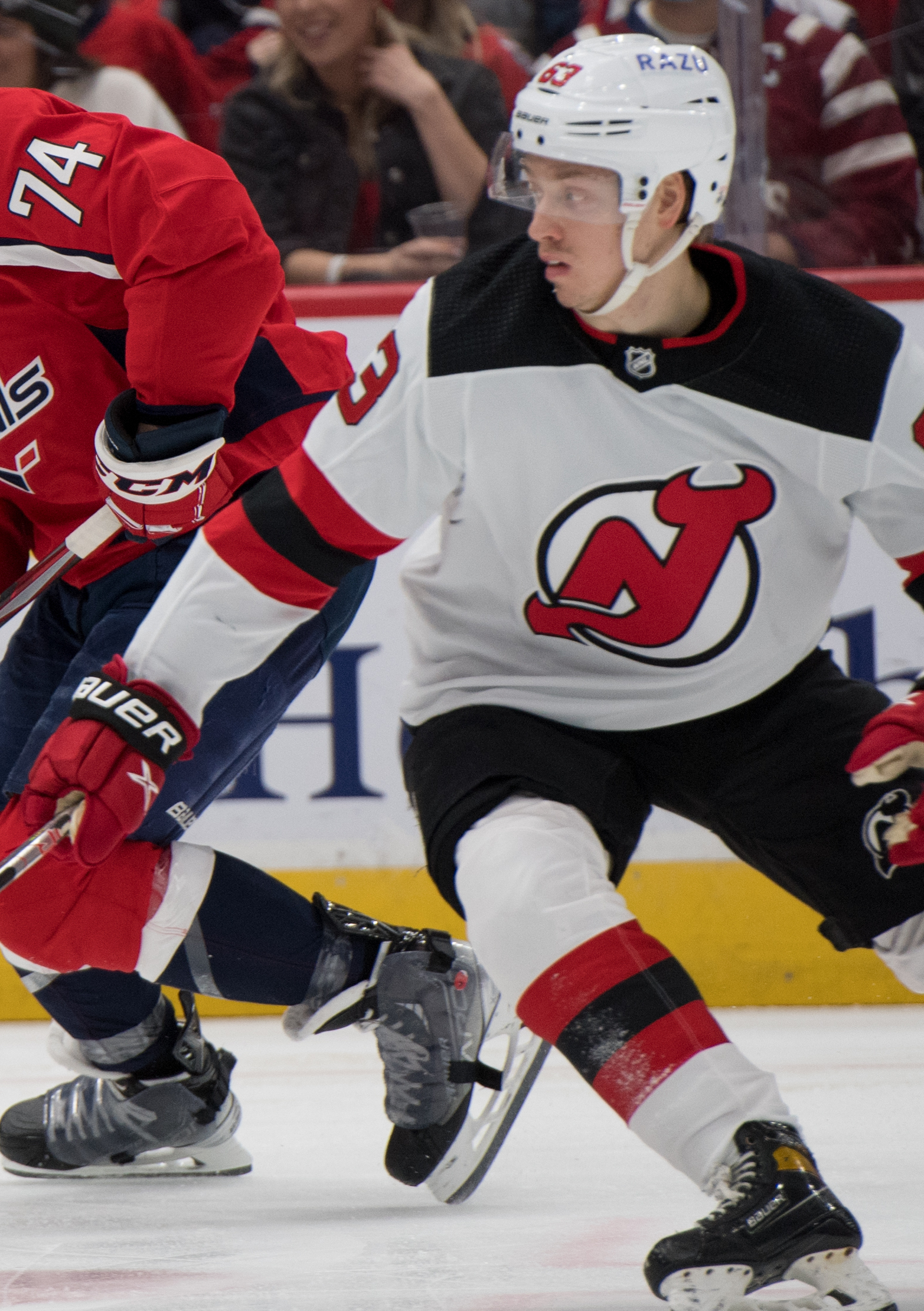
Bratt with the Devils in 2022

Bratt scored two points in his first NHL game, a power play goal and a shorthanded assist in a 4–1 victory over the Colorado Avalanche. He became the lowest-drafted player to debut in the NHL as a teenager since Roman Vopat and Richard Zedník debuted during the 1994–95 NHL season. Bratt had 10 goals and 30 points by the All-Star break, having spent much of the first half of the season playing alongside Taylor Hall and Nico Hischier on the Devils' first line; however, the Devils' trade deadline acquisition of Patrick Maroon from the Edmonton Oilers led to a decrease in opportunities for Bratt, who scored only one goal following the All-Star break. Bratt finished his rookie season with 13 goals and 22 assists for a total of 35 points in 74 games played.

Bratt fractured his jaw in early October 2018 during practice, which caused him to miss the first 13 games of the 2018–19 season. Bratt continued to play alongside Hischier during his sophomore season, although he played sparingly with Hall, who won the Hart Memorial Trophy the season prior playing alongside Bratt for a significant portion of the season. Bratt finished the 2018–19 season with 8 goals and 25 assists for a total of 33 points in 51 games played.

On 10 January 2021, Bratt was re-signed to a two-year, $5.5 million contract by the Devils. On 19 March 2023, Bratt recorded his first NHL hat trick in a 5–2 win over the Tampa Bay Lightning.

On 15 June 2023, the Devils re-signed Bratt to an eight-year, $63 million contract. He was named to the 2024 NHL All-Star Game in January 2024, following an injury to would-be attending teammate Jack Hughes.

== International play ==
Bratt played for the Swedish national team in the 2019 World Championship.

He was named to play for Sweden's team in the NHL's 4 Nations Face-Off tournament, which took place between 12 and 20 February 2025.

== Career statistics ==
=== Regular season and playoffs ===
			Regular season					Playoffs
Season	Team	League	GP	G	A	Pts	PIM	GP	G	A	Pts	PIM
2014–15	AIK	J20	39	17	23	40	20	1	0	0	0	0
2014–15	AIK	Allsv	1	0	0	0	0	—	—	—	—	—
2015–16	AIK	J20	2	1	1	2	2	—	—	—	—	—
2015–16	AIK	Allsv	48	8	9	17	6	10	0	0	0	4
2016–17	AIK	J20	1	0	1	1	0	2	0	0	0	2
2016–17	AIK	Allsv	46	6	16	22	6	8	1	1	2	0
2017–18	New Jersey Devils	NHL	74	13	22	35	18	1	0	0	0	0
2018–19	New Jersey Devils	NHL	51	8	25	33	6	—	—	—	—	—
2019–20	New Jersey Devils	NHL	60	16	16	32	6	—	—	—	—	—
2020–21	New Jersey Devils	NHL	46	7	23	30	8	—	—	—	—	—
2021–22	New Jersey Devils	NHL	76	26	47	73	16	—	—	—	—	—
2022–23	New Jersey Devils	NHL	82	32	41	73	6	12	1	5	6	4
2023–24	New Jersey Devils	NHL	82	27	56	83	12	—	—	—	—	—
2024–25	New Jersey Devils	NHL	81	21	67	88	18	5	1	2	3	0
2025–26	New Jersey Devils	NHL	82	22	49	71	12	—	—	—	—	—
NHL totals			634	172	346	518	102	18	2	7	9	4

=== International ===
Medal record

Men's ice hockey

Representing Sweden

World U18 Championships
Silver medal – second place	2016 United States	

Year	Team	Event	Result	GP	G	A	Pts	PIM
2014	Sweden	U17	3rd place, bronze medalist(s)	6	1	3	4	2
2015	Sweden	IH18	2nd place, silver medalist(s)	5	3	2	5	0
2016	Sweden	WJC18	2nd place, silver medalist(s)	7	2	2	4	2
2019	Sweden	WC	5th	6	0	2	2	0
2025	Sweden	4NF	3rd	3	1	1	2	0
2026	Sweden	OG	7th	4	0	1	1	0
Junior totals				18	6	7	13	4
Senior totals				13	1	4	5	0

== Awards and honours ==
Award	Year	Ref
NHL
NHL All-Star Game	2024	
