= John MacLean (ice hockey) =

Canadian ice hockey player (born 1964)

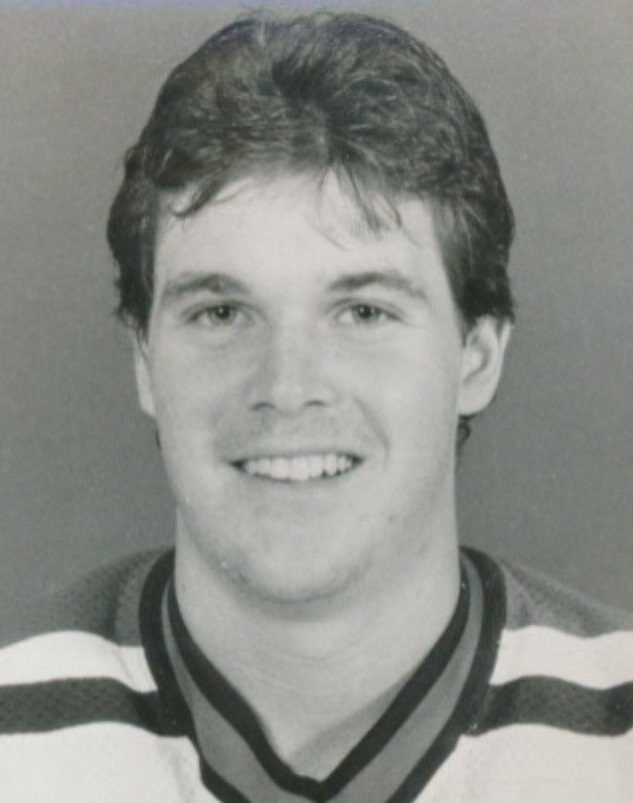
- MacLean with the New Jersey Devils in 1983
- Born: November 20, 1964 (age 61) Oshawa, Ontario, Canada
- Height: 6 ft 0 in (183 cm)
- Weight: 200 lb (91 kg; 14 st 4 lb)
- Position: Right wing
- Shot: Right
- Played for: New Jersey Devils; San Jose Sharks; New York Rangers; Dallas Stars
- National team: Canada
- NHL draft: 6th overall, 1983; New Jersey Devils
- Playing career: 1983–2002
Medal record
Representing Canada
World Championships
Silver medal – second place	1989 Stockholm

John Carter MacLean (born November 20, 1964) is a Canadian professional ice hockey coach and former player. He most recently served as the assistant coach for the New York Islanders of the National Hockey League (NHL). He spent the majority of his playing career as a member of the New Jersey Devils, and also spent time with the San Jose Sharks, New York Rangers and Dallas Stars.

== Playing career ==
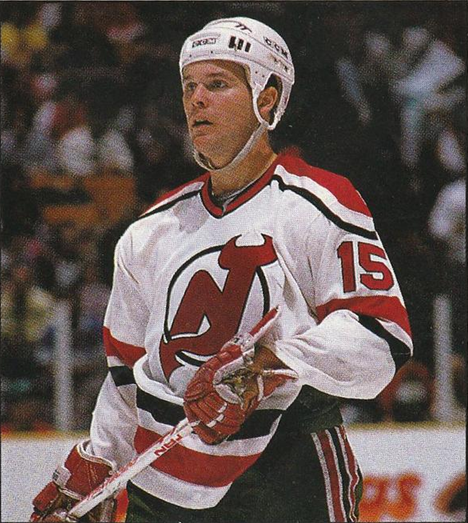
1988 photo of MacLean for New Jersey Devils

As a youth, MacLean played in the 1977 Quebec International Pee-Wee Hockey Tournament with a minor ice hockey team from Oshawa.

MacLean was selected 6th overall in the 1983 NHL entry draft. He was selected as the 1st choice of the New Jersey Devils. MacLean made his Devils debut on October 5, 1983 against the New York Rangers. Perhaps his most memorable moment as a Devil came on April 3, 1988, when he scored a goal in overtime against the Chicago Blackhawks to send the Devils to the playoffs for the first time. Following this breakthrough year, MacLean notched three straight 40-goal seasons before he was forced to miss the 1991–92 season due to a serious knee injury sustained during a preseason game. During his tenure with the Devils, MacLean won the Stanley Cup in 1995 while serving as the team's alternate captain. He remained with the Devils until December 7, 1997 when he was traded to the San Jose Sharks. After finishing the 1997–98 season with the Sharks, MacLean signed as a free agent with the New York Rangers on July 9, 1998. The Rangers traded MacLean to the Dallas Stars in February 2001.

On June 7, 2002, MacLean retired from hockey after 18 seasons. He played a total 1,194 games, scoring 413 goals, adding 429 assists for 842 career points, and was the all-time leading scorer for the New Jersey Devils until March 17, 2009, when his record was surpassed by Patrik Eliáš.

MacLean has been a resident of Verona, New Jersey since 1991.

== Coaching career ==
In September 2002, MacLean joined the coaching staff of the New Jersey Devils, and served as an assistant coach until July 2009. He earned his second Stanley Cup, as an assistant coach, in 2003. In 2007, he was a candidate for the head coach position but the job was given to Brent Sutter, and MacLean remained as assistant coach.

On June 9, 2009, Brent Sutter resigned as head coach of the Devils and remarked that MacLean was ready to be head coach. On July 13, 2009, MacLean was named head coach of the Lowell Devils.

On June 17, 2010, MacLean was named head coach of the New Jersey Devils.

On December 23, 2010, the Devils were sporting a 9–22–2 record and sitting in last place in the Eastern Conference. MacLean was fired from his coaching position and was replaced by Jacques Lemaire.

On December 1, 2011, the Carolina Hurricanes, after hiring Kirk Muller as their new head coach, hired MacLean as an assistant coach. MacLean, along with fellow assistant coach Dave Lewis, was relieved of his duties on May 5, 2014.

On July 27, 2017, MacLean joined the Arizona Coyotes as an assistant coach.

On September 8, 2021, the San Jose Sharks hired MacLean as an assistant coach. He was relieved of his duties on July 1, 2022.

On July 28, 2022, MacLean was hired as an assistant coach by the New York Islanders.

On May 29, 2025, MacLean was relieved of his duties.

== Post-playing career ==
In addition to working as an analyst on NHL Network, MacLean most recently served as a hockey analyst for MSG Networks, including the pre- and post-game coverage for the Devils.

== Awards ==
- Stanley Cup (1995) New Jersey Devils - As Player
- Stanley Cup (2003) New Jersey Devils - As Assistant Coach
- Memorial Cup tournament All-Star Team (1983)
- Selected to two NHL All-Star Games, 1989 and 1991
- New Jersey Devils MVP, 1989–90
- New Jersey Devils Ring of Honor

== Career statistics ==
=== Regular season and playoffs ===
			Regular season					Playoffs
Season	Team	League	GP	G	A	Pts	PIM	GP	G	A	Pts	PIM
1980–81	Oshawa Legionnaires	MetJHL	41	35	35	70	151	—	—	—	—	—
1981–82	Oshawa Generals	OHL	67	17	22	39	197	12	3	6	9	63
1982–83	Oshawa Generals	OHL	66	47	51	98	138	17	18	20	38	35
1983–84	Oshawa Generals	OHL	30	23	36	59	58	7	2	5	7	18
1983–84	New Jersey Devils	NHL	23	1	0	1	10	—	—	—	—	—
1984–85	New Jersey Devils	NHL	61	13	20	33	44	—	—	—	—	—
1985–86	New Jersey Devils	NHL	74	21	36	57	112	—	—	—	—	—
1986–87	New Jersey Devils	NHL	80	31	36	67	120	—	—	—	—	—
1987–88	New Jersey Devils	NHL	76	23	16	39	147	20	7	11	18	60
1988–89	New Jersey Devils	NHL	74	42	45	87	122	—	—	—	—	—
1989–90	New Jersey Devils	NHL	80	41	38	79	80	6	4	1	5	12
1990–91	New Jersey Devils	NHL	78	45	33	78	150	7	5	3	8	20
1992–93	New Jersey Devils	NHL	80	24	24	48	102	5	0	1	1	10
1993–94	New Jersey Devils	NHL	80	37	33	70	95	20	6	10	16	22
1994–95	New Jersey Devils	NHL	46	17	12	29	32	20	5	13	18	14
1995–96	New Jersey Devils	NHL	76	20	28	48	91	—	—	—	—	—
1996–97	New Jersey Devils	NHL	80	29	25	54	49	10	4	5	9	4
1997–98	New Jersey Devils	NHL	26	3	8	11	14	—	—	—	—	—
1997–98	San Jose Sharks	NHL	51	13	19	32	28	6	2	3	5	4
1998–99	New York Rangers	NHL	82	28	27	55	46	—	—	—	—	—
1999–00	New York Rangers	NHL	77	18	24	42	52	—	—	—	—	—
2000–01	Manitoba Moose	IHL	32	6	12	18	28	—	—	—	—	—
2000–01	New York Rangers	NHL	2	0	0	0	0	—	—	—	—	—
2000–01	Dallas Stars	NHL	28	4	2	6	17	10	2	1	3	6
2001–02	Utah Grizzlies	AHL	5	0	1	1	4	—	—	—	—	—
2001–02	Dallas Stars	NHL	20	3	3	6	17	—	—	—	—	—
NHL totals			1,194	413	429	842	1,328	104	35	48	83	152

=== International ===
Year	Team	Event	GP	G	A	Pts	PIM
1984	Canada	WJC	7	7	1	8	4
1989	Canada	WC	10	3	6	9	4
Junior totals			7	7	1	8	4
Senior totals			10	3	6	9	4

== Coaching record ==
=== NHL coaching record ===
Team	Year	Regular season						Postseason			
Team	Year	G	W	L	OTL	Pts	Finish	W	L	Win%	Result
NJD	2010–11	33	9	22	2	20	(fired)	—	—	—	—
Total		33	9	22	2			—	—	—	

=== AHL statistics ===
Season	Team	Games	Won	Lost	Tied	OTL	SOL	Points	Goals for	Goals against	Standing
2009–10	Lowell (AHL)	80	39	31	—	4	6	88	239	232	4th, Atlantic

== Records ==
- New Jersey Devils franchise record for power play points (197)
- New Jersey season goals leader: 1988–89 (42), 1989–90 (41), 1990–91 (45), 1993–94 (37), 1996–97 (29, tie)
- New Jersey playoffs points leader: 1991 (8, tie), 1997 (9)
- New Jersey playoffs goals leader: 1990 (4), 1991 (5), 1997 (4, tie)
- New Jersey playoffs assists leader: 1997 (5)
- San Jose Sharks playoffs points leader: 1998 (5, tie)
- San Jose Sharks playoffs goals leader: 1998 (2, tie)

== See also ==
- List of NHL players with 1,000 games played

Preceded by Ken Daneyko	New Jersey Devils first-round draft pick 1983	Succeeded by Kirk Muller
Preceded by Jacques Lemaire	Head coach of the New Jersey Devils; 2010	Succeeded by Jacques Lemaire
