= 2002–03 New Jersey Devils season =

National Hockey League season

2002–03 New Jersey Devils
- Stanley Cup champions
- Eastern Conference champions
- Atlantic Division champions
- Division: 1st Atlantic
- Conference: 2nd Eastern
- 2002–03 record: 46–20–10–6
- Home record: 25–11–3–2
- Road record: 21–9–7–4
- Goals for: 216
- Goals against: 166

Team information
- General manager: Lou Lamoriello
- Coach: Pat Burns
- Captain: Scott Stevens
- Alternate captains: Patrik Elias; Scott Niedermayer
- Arena: Continental Airlines Arena
- Average attendance: 14,858
- Minor league affiliate: Albany River Rats

Team leaders
- Goals: Patrik Elias (28)
- Assists: Scott Gomez (42)
- Points: Patrik Elias (57)
- Penalty minutes: Turner Stevenson (115)
- Plus/minus: Jeff Friesen; Scott Niedermayer (+23)
- Wins: Martin Brodeur (41)
- Goals against average: Corey Schwab (1.47)

The 2002–03 New Jersey Devils season was the 29th season for the National Hockey League (NHL) franchise that was established on June 11, 1974, and 21st season since the franchise relocated from Colorado prior to the 1982–83 NHL season. After claiming the Atlantic Division and Eastern Conference titles, the Devils won their third Stanley Cup championship in a seven-game series against the Mighty Ducks of Anaheim.

In addition to the Devils reaching the Stanley Cup Finals, the other New Jersey team from one of the major professional sports leagues, the New Jersey Nets of the National Basketball Association (NBA), have reached the NBA Finals where they lost in six games to the San Antonio Spurs.

== Regular season ==
The Devils tied the Philadelphia Flyers for fewest goals allowed (166) and had the fewest power-play opportunities against (264), the fewest power-play goals against (32) and the best penalty-kill percentage (87.88%). The Devils also tied the Detroit Red Wings, Los Angeles Kings and Washington Capitals for fewest short-handed goals allowed, with four. Furthermore, the Devils also had the fewest power-play opportunities for (303), the fewest power-play goals for (36) and the lowest power-play percentage, at 11.88%.

- January 17, 2003: Joe Nieuwendyk scored his 500th career goal against the Carolina Hurricanes in a 2–1 Devils victory. He then recorded his 1,000th career point on February 23 in a 4–3 win over the Pittsburgh Penguins.

=== Season standings ===
Atlantic Division
No.	CR		GP	W	L	T	OTL	GF	GA	Pts
1	2	**New Jersey Devils**	82	46	20	10	6	216	166	108
2	4	**Philadelphia Flyers**	82	45	20	13	4	211	166	107
3	8	**New York Islanders**	82	35	34	11	2	224	231	83
4	9	New York Rangers	82	32	36	10	4	210	231	78
5	14	Pittsburgh Penguins	82	27	44	6	5	189	255	65

Note: CR = Conference rank; GP = Games played; W = Wins; L = Losses; T = Ties; OTL = Overtime loss; GF = Goals for; GA = Goals against; Pts = Points
Bolded teams qualified for the playoffs.

Eastern Conference
R		Div	GP	W	L	T	OTL	GF	GA	Pts
**1**	**P-** Ottawa Senators	**NE**	**82**	**52**	**21**	**8**	**1**	**263**	**182**	113
**2**	**Y-** New Jersey Devils	**AT**	**82**	**46**	**20**	**10**	**6**	**216**	**166**	108
**3**	**Y-** Tampa Bay Lightning	**SE**	**82**	**36**	**25**	**16**	**5**	**219**	**210**	93
**4**	**X-** Philadelphia Flyers	**AT**	**82**	**45**	**20**	**13**	**4**	**211**	**166**	107
**5**	**X-** Toronto Maple Leafs	**NE**	**82**	**44**	**28**	**7**	**3**	**236**	**208**	98
**6**	**X-** Washington Capitals	**SE**	**82**	**39**	**29**	**8**	**6**	**224**	**220**	92
**7**	**X-** Boston Bruins	**NE**	**82**	**36**	**31**	**11**	**4**	**245**	**237**	87
**8**	**X-** New York Islanders	**AT**	**82**	**35**	**34**	**11**	**2**	**224**	**231**	83
8.5
9	New York Rangers	AT	82	32	36	10	4	210	231	78
10	Montreal Canadiens	NE	82	30	35	8	9	206	234	77
11	Atlanta Thrashers	SE	82	31	39	7	5	226	284	74
12	Buffalo Sabres	NE	82	27	37	10	8	190	219	72
13	Florida Panthers	SE	82	24	36	13	9	176	237	70
14	Pittsburgh Penguins	AT	82	27	44	6	5	189	255	65
15	Carolina Hurricanes	SE	82	22	43	11	6	171	240	61

Divisions: AT – Atlantic, NE – Northeast, SE – Southeast

P – Clinched Presidents Trophy; Y – Clinched division; X – Clinched playoff spot

== Playoffs ==
=== Eastern Conference Quarterfinals ===
The series opened at Continental Airlines Arena in New Jersey, and game one was a defensive battle in an ultimate 2–1 Devils victory behind two goals from Jamie Langenbrunner. New Jersey then took control of the series with a 4–2 victory in Game 2.

Down 2–0 in the series but heading home to FleetCenter, Boston shook things up, replacing Steve Shields, who allowed six goals in the first two games, in favor of Jeff Hackett. The shakeup did not do much, as the Devils shut out in the Bruins in Game 3, 3–0, with goalie Martin Brodeur stopping all 29 shots he faced. In game 4, Ken Daneyko was a healthy scratch and did not play that game. It was the first time in his career that he was a healthy scratch in the playoffs. Not wanting to end their season with a winless postseason and a loss in front of their fans, Boston came out firing by winning the game, 5–1 and knocking out Brodeur after the fifth goal in favor of Corey Schwab, who went six-for-six in net.

Unfortunately for the Bruins and their fans, they had only "stayed their execution" until game five in New Jersey, where Brodeur bounced back from his horrid Game 4 with a 28-save shutout in a 3–0 win as Langenbrunner added two more goals.

=== Eastern Conference semifinals ===
The series opened at Continental Airlines Arena in New Jersey, where the Devils scored three third-period goals to break a scoreless tie en route to a 3–0 game one victory with goalie Martin Brodeur posting a 15-save shutout in the process. Game two was a little tenser, with New Jersey rallying from a third-period deficit and winning the game 2:09 into overtime, 3–2, on a goal by Jamie Langenbrunner.

In game three at St. Pete Times Forum in Tampa, the Lightning jumped out to a 3–0 first-period lead. Then, Scott Stevens was injured by a puck that hit him in the face from a slapshot by Pavel Kubina. Following that, New Jersey tied the score before scoring in the third period on a goal by Dave Andreychuk to win the game, 4–3 for Tampa. Stevens recovered and returned for game four, and the Devils responded by winning, 3–1, to push the Lightning to the brink. The Devils ended the series with a 2–1 triple-overtime victory in game five, with Grant Marshall scoring the game-winning goal 11:12 into the sixth period.

=== Eastern Conference finals ===
The series opened at Corel Centre in Ottawa, where the Senators took game one in overtime, 3–2, when Shaun Van Allen tipped in a pass from Martin Havlát 3:08 into overtime. New Jersey tied the series, 1–1, with a crucial victory in game two, 4–1. It marked the first time Ottawa goalie Patrick Lalime allowed more than two goals in twelve postseason games.

Game three at the Continental Airlines Arena in New Jersey saw an amazing defensive battle, but New Jersey won the game, 1–0, on a first-period goal by Sergei Brylin. Martin Brodeur posted a 24-save shutout for the Devils in the process. New Jersey appeared to have the series in control when they broke a 2–2 tie in game four with three third-period goals en route to a 5–2 win, and they led in the series, 3–1. But, it wasn't over yet, as Minnesota (twice) and Vancouver rebounded from 3–1 series deficits earlier in the playoffs.

Ottawa returned home for game five, not wanting to lose in front of their fans. They staved off elimination with a 3–1 victory. The tense action resumed back in New Jersey for game six, as the teams entered overtime tied, 1–1, and all the Devils needed was a goal to knock out the Senators. The death blow did not come in game six, as Chris Phillips scored the game-winning goal 15:52 into overtime in the 2–1 Senators victory. This would be the Devils only home loss of the playoffs.

Determined not to suffer the same misfortunes as Colorado, St. Louis, and Vancouver, the Devils broke through in game seven, winning the game, 3–2, as Jeff Friesen knocked in the series-winning goal with just over two minutes to play to send New Jersey to the Stanley Cup Finals. In the decisive game, the Devils benefited from a two-goal performance by Jamie Langenbrunner, his first goals of the series.

=== Stanley Cup Finals ===
For the Devils, this was their fourth Stanley Cup Finals appearance, after making the Finals previously in 1995, 2000, and 2001. As for the Mighty Ducks, it was their first ever Stanley Cup Finals appearance in franchise history after defeating the Detroit Red Wings, Dallas Stars, and Minnesota Wild. The Devils had a strong start in game one at the Meadowlands as they shut out the Ducks 3–0. Game two was pretty much Deja Vu for the Devils as they once again blanked the Ducks 3–0. Down 2–0 in the series, the Ducks responded at home in Anaheim with a 3–2 overtime victory. Then, in game four, Anaheim tied the series at two in a 1–0 overtime win. Back at the Meadowlands, game five was much more competitive and high tempo. While both teams went back and forth with three goals each, the Devils would add three more goals to win 6–3. Facing elimination in game six, the Ducks did not disappoint their fans as they won game six 5–2. However, during that game, Scott Stevens laid a vicious check on Paul Kariya, knocking him to the ground. Kariya quickly recovered and scored the game-winning goal, tying the series at three games apiece. The Devils ended the series with an exclamation mark as they shut out the Ducks 3–0 once more to capture their third Stanley Cup championship in nine seasons. While the Devils did win the cup, Jean-Sébastien Giguère of Anaheim won the Conn Smythe Trophy, making it the first time in sixteen years that a player from the losing team won the Conn Smythe Trophy.

== Schedule and results ==
=== Preseason ===
2002 preseason
Preseason: 3–3–2 (home: 1–1–2; road: 2–2–0)

Game	Date	Score	Opponent	Record	Recap
1	September 20, 2002	4–4	Pittsburgh Penguins	0–0–1	T
2	September 21, 2002	5–1	@ Philadelphia Flyers	1–0–1	W
3	September 22, 2002	3–4	@ Pittsburgh Penguins	1–1–1	L
4	September 24, 2002	2–1 OT	@ New York Rangers	2–1–1	W
5	September 26, 2002	4–0	Philadelphia Flyers	3–1–1	W
6	September 27, 2002	2–2	New York Rangers	3–1–2	T
7	October 1, 2002	2–5	@ New York Islanders	3–2–2	L
8	October 5, 2002	1–3	New York Islanders	3–3–2	L

Legend: W Win (2 points) L Loss (0 points) T Tie (1 point) OTL Overtime loss (1 point)

=== Regular season ===
2002–03 regular season
October: 6–2–0–0 (home: 3–1–0–0; road: 3–1–0–0)

Game	Date	Score	Opponent	Record	Points	Recap
1	October 10, 2002	2–1	@ Ottawa Senators (2002–03)	1–0–0–0	2	W
2	October 12, 2002	3–2	Columbus Blue Jackets (2002–03)	2–0–0–0	4	W
3	October 18, 2002	3–2 OT	Nashville Predators (2002–03)	3–0–0–0	6	W
4	October 19, 2002	1–3	@ Carolina Hurricanes (2002–03)	3–1–0–0	6	L
5	October 23, 2002	2–1	@ Atlanta Thrashers (2002–03)	4–1–0–0	8	W
6	October 25, 2002	2–1	@ Buffalo Sabres (2002–03)	5–1–0–0	10	W
7	October 26, 2002	5–1	Tampa Bay Lightning (2002–03)	6–1–0–0	12	W
8	October 29, 2002	1–2	Carolina Hurricanes (2002–03)	6–2–0–0	12	L

November: 7–4–1–1 (home: 4–3–1–0; road: 3–1–0–1)

Game	Date	Score	Opponent	Record	Points	Recap
9	November 2, 2002	5–1	Chicago Blackhawks (2002–03)	7–2–0–0	14	W
10	November 5, 2002	2–3	Calgary Flames (2002–03)	7–3–0–0	14	L
11	November 7, 2002	1–0	@ Philadelphia Flyers (2002–03)	8–3–0–0	16	W
12	November 9, 2002	3–6	Edmonton Oilers (2002–03)	8–4–0–0	16	L
13	November 12, 2002	3–2 OT	Mighty Ducks of Anaheim (2002–03)	9–4–0–0	18	W
14	November 15, 2002	5–1	Montreal Canadiens (2002–03)	10–4–0–0	20	W
15	November 16, 2002	1–3	@ Montreal Canadiens (2002–03)	10–5–0–0	20	L
16	November 19, 2002	4–3 OT	Buffalo Sabres (2002–03)	11–5–0–0	22	W
17	November 21, 2002	4–4 OT	New York Rangers (2002–03)	11–5–1–0	23	T
18	November 23, 2002	1–3	Tampa Bay Lightning (2002–03)	11–6–1–0	23	L
19	November 27, 2002	2–3 OT	@ Detroit Red Wings (2002–03)	11–6–1–1	24	OTL
20	November 29, 2002	2–1	@ Nashville Predators (2002–03)	12–6–1–1	26	W
21	November 30, 2002	5–4 OT	@ St. Louis Blues (2002–03)	13–6–1–1	28	W

December: 7–4–1–2 (home: 4–1–0–1; road: 3–3–1–1)

Game	Date	Score	Opponent	Record	Points	Recap
22	December 2, 2002	1–0 OT	@ Philadelphia Flyers (2002–03)	14–6–1–1	30	W
23	December 4, 2002	2–3 OT	Vancouver Canucks (2002–03)	14–6–1–2	31	OTL
24	December 6, 2002	3–1	Pittsburgh Penguins (2002–03)	15–6–1–2	33	W
25	December 7, 2002	0–1	@ Toronto Maple Leafs (2002–03)	15–7–1–2	33	L
26	December 10, 2002	2–0	St. Louis Blues (2002–03)	16–7–1–2	35	W
27	December 12, 2002	2–4	@ Columbus Blue Jackets (2002–03)	16–8–1–2	35	L
28	December 14, 2002	3–4 OT	@ Ottawa Senators (2002–03)	16–8–1–3	36	OTL
29	December 18, 2002	0–3	Ottawa Senators (2002–03)	16–9–1–3	36	L
30	December 19, 2002	3–1	@ Pittsburgh Penguins (2002–03)	17–9–1–3	38	W
31	December 21, 2002	5–3	Dallas Stars (2002–03)	18–9–1–3	40	W
32	December 23, 2002	2–2 OT	@ New York Rangers (2002–03)	18–9–2–3	41	T
33	December 27, 2002	2–3	@ Washington Capitals (2002–03)	18–10–2–3	41	L
34	December 28, 2002	2–1 OT	Washington Capitals (2002–03)	19–10–2–3	43	W
35	December 30, 2002	1–0	@ Boston Bruins (2002–03)	20–10–2–3	45	W

January: 11–2–1–1 (home: 7–1–0–0; road: 4–1–1–1)

Game	Date	Score	Opponent	Record	Points	Recap
36	January 1, 2003	1–2	Florida Panthers (2002–03)	20–11–2–3	45	L
37	January 3, 2003	2–0	Toronto Maple Leafs (2002–03)	21–11–2–3	47	W
38	January 4, 2003	1–2	@ Toronto Maple Leafs (2002–03)	21–12–2–3	47	L
39	January 7, 2003	3–2	Montreal Canadiens (2002–03)	22–12–2–3	49	W
40	January 10, 2003	2–1	@ Florida Panthers (2002–03)	23–12–2–3	51	W
41	January 11, 2003	3–3 OT	@ Tampa Bay Lightning (2002–03)	23–12–3–3	52	T
42	January 13, 2003	6–2	Florida Panthers (2002–03)	24–12–3–3	54	W
43	January 15, 2003	5–0	New York Islanders (2002–03)	25–12–3–3	56	W
44	January 17, 2003	2–1	@ Carolina Hurricanes (2002–03)	26–12–3–3	58	W
45	January 18, 2003	5–2	Carolina Hurricanes (2002–03)	27–12–3–3	60	W
46	January 22, 2003	5–4 OT	@ San Jose Sharks (2002–03)	28–12–3–3	62	W
47	January 24, 2003	3–1	@ Mighty Ducks of Anaheim (2002–03)	29–12–3–3	64	W
48	January 25, 2003	1–2 OT	@ Los Angeles Kings (2002–03)	29–12–3–4	65	OTL
49	January 28, 2003	1–0	Detroit Red Wings (2002–03)	30–12–3–4	67	W
50	January 30, 2003	5–1	Philadelphia Flyers (2002–03)	31–12–3–4	69	W

February: 6–4–3–0 (home: 3–3–1–0; road: 3–1–2–0)

Game	Date	Score	Opponent	Record	Points	Recap
51	February 4, 2003	4–1	Buffalo Sabres (2002–03)	32–12–3–4	71	W
52	February 5, 2003	4–1	@ Washington Capitals (2002–03)	33–12–3–4	73	W
53	February 7, 2003	2–4	Atlanta Thrashers (2002–03)	33–13–3–4	73	L
54	February 9, 2003	3–2	Minnesota Wild (2002–03)	34–13–3–4	75	W
55	February 11, 2003	1–3	@ Colorado Avalanche (2002–03)	34–14–3–4	75	L
56	February 12, 2003	3–0	@ Phoenix Coyotes (2002–03)	35–14–3–4	77	W
57	February 15, 2003	1–4	Pittsburgh Penguins (2002–03)	35–15–3–4	77	L
58	February 18, 2003	2–2 OT	@ Philadelphia Flyers (2002–03)	35–15–4–4	78	T
59	February 19, 2003	3–5	Ottawa Senators (2002–03)	35–16–4–4	78	L
60	February 21, 2003	3–2	Boston Bruins (2002–03)	36–16–4–4	80	W
61	February 23, 2003	4–3	@ Pittsburgh Penguins (2002–03)	37–16–4–4	82	W
62	February 25, 2003	3–3 OT	New York Rangers (2002–03)	37–16–5–4	83	T
63	February 27, 2003	3–3 OT	@ New York Islanders (2002–03)	37–16–6–4	84	T

March: 8–4–2–1 (home: 4–2–0–0; road: 4–2–2–1)

Game	Date	Score	Opponent	Record	Points	Recap
64	March 1, 2003	2–1 OT	Washington Capitals (2002–03)	38–16–6–4	86	W
65	March 4, 2003	2–3	@ Minnesota Wild (2002–03)	38–17–6–4	86	L
66	March 5, 2003	4–5 OT	@ Calgary Flames (2002–03)	38–17–6–5	87	OTL
67	March 8, 2003	4–2	@ New York Islanders (2002–03)	39–17–6–5	89	W
68	March 11, 2003	2–3	Atlanta Thrashers (2002–03)	39–18–6–5	89	L
69	March 13, 2003	3–4	@ Boston Bruins (2002–03)	39–19–6–5	89	L
70	March 15, 2003	3–1	New York Rangers (2002–03)	40–19–6–5	91	W
71	March 17, 2003	2–4	Philadelphia Flyers (2002–03)	40–20–6–5	91	L
72	March 18, 2003	1–0	@ Montreal Canadiens (2002–03)	41–20–6–5	93	W
73	March 21, 2003	3–1	Pittsburgh Penguins (2002–03)	42–20–6–5	95	W
74	March 22, 2003	4–2	@ New York Islanders (2002–03)	43–20–6–5	97	W
75	March 24, 2003	4–1	@ Florida Panthers (2002–03)	44–20–6–5	99	W
76	March 27, 2003	2–2 OT	@ Tampa Bay Lightning (2002–03)	44–20–7–5	100	T
77	March 28, 2003	1–1 OT	@ Atlanta Thrashers (2002–03)	44–20–8–5	101	T
78	March 30, 2003	6–0	New York Islanders (2002–03)	45–20–8–5	103	W

April: 1–0–2–1 (home: 0–0–1–1; road: 1–0–1–0)

Game	Date	Score	Opponent	Record	Points	Recap
79	April 1, 2003	2–3 OT	Toronto Maple Leafs (2002–03)	45–20–8–6	104	OTL
80	April 3, 2003	1–1 OT	Boston Bruins (2002–03)	45–20–9–6	105	T
81	April 4, 2003	2–1	@ New York Rangers (2002–03)	46–20–9–6	107	W
82	April 6, 2003	2–2 OT	@ Buffalo Sabres (2002–03)	46–20–10–6	108	T

Legend: W Win (2 points) L Loss (0 points) T Tie (1 point) OTL Overtime loss (1 point)

=== Playoffs ===
2003 Stanley Cup playoffs
Eastern Conference Quarterfinals vs. (7) Boston Bruins – Devils win 4–1

Game	Date	Score	Opponent	Series	Recap
1	April 9, 2003	2–1	Boston Bruins	Devils lead 1–0	W
2	April 11, 2003	4–2	Boston Bruins	Devils lead 2–0	W
3	April 13, 2003	3–0	@ Boston Bruins	Devils lead 3–0	W
4	April 15, 2003	1–5	@ Boston Bruins	Devils lead 3–1	L
5	April 17, 2003	3–0	Boston Bruins	Devils win 4–1	W

Eastern Conference Semifinals vs. (3) Tampa Bay Lightning – Devils win 4–1

Game	Date	Score	Opponent	Series	Recap
1	April 24, 2003	3–0	Tampa Bay Lightning	Devils lead 1–0	W
2	April 26, 2003	3–2 OT	Tampa Bay Lightning	Devils lead 2–0	W
3	April 28, 2003	3–4	@ Tampa Bay Lightning	Devils lead 2–1	L
4	April 30, 2003	3–1	@ Tampa Bay Lightning	Devils lead 3–1	W
5	May 2, 2003	2–1 3OT	Tampa Bay Lightning	Devils win 4–1	W

Eastern Conference Finals vs. (1) Ottawa Senators – Devils win 4–3

Game	Date	Score	Opponent	Series	Recap
1	May 10, 2003	2–3 OT	@ Ottawa Senators	Senators lead 1–0	L
2	May 13, 2003	4–1	@ Ottawa Senators	Series tied 1–1	W
3	May 15, 2003	1–0	Ottawa Senators	Devils lead 2–1	W
4	May 17, 2003	5–2	Ottawa Senators	Devils lead 3–1	W
5	May 19, 2003	1–3	@ Ottawa Senators	Devils lead 3–2	L
6	May 21, 2003	1–2 OT	Ottawa Senators	Series tied 3–3	L
7	May 23, 2003	3–2	@ Ottawa Senators	Devils win 4–3	W

Stanley Cup Finals vs. (W7) Anaheim Mighty Ducks – Devils win 4–3

Game	Date	Score	Opponent	Series	Recap
1	May 27, 2003	3–0	Anaheim Mighty Ducks	Devils lead 1–0	W
2	May 29, 2003	3–0	Anaheim Mighty Ducks	Devils lead 2–0	W
3	May 31, 2003	2–3 OT	@ Anaheim Mighty Ducks	Devils lead 2–1	L
4	June 2, 2003	0–1 OT	@ Anaheim Mighty Ducks	Series tied 2–2	L
5	June 5, 2003	6–3	Anaheim Mighty Ducks	Devils lead 3–2	W
6	June 7, 2003	2–5	@ Anaheim Mighty Ducks	Series tied 3–3	L
7	June 9, 2003	3–0	Anaheim Mighty Ducks	Devils win 4–3	W

Legend: W Win L Loss

== Player statistics ==
=== Scoring ===
- Position abbreviations: C = Center; D = Defense; G = Goaltender; LW = Left wing; RW = Right wing
- † = Joined team via a transaction (e.g., trade, waivers, signing) during the season. Stats reflect time with the Devils only.
- ‡ = Left team via a transaction (e.g., trade, waivers, release) during the season. Stats reflect time with the Devils only.

No.	Player	Pos	Regular season						Playoffs					
No.	Player	Pos	GP	G	A	Pts	+/-	PIM	GP	G	A	Pts	+/-	PIM
26	Patrik Elias	LW	81	28	29	57	17	22	24	5	8	13	5	26
15	Jamie Langenbrunner	RW	78	22	33	55	17	65	24	11	7	18	11	16
23	Scott Gomez	C	80	13	42	55	17	48	24	3	9	12	3	2
12	Jeff Friesen	LW	81	23	28	51	23	26	24	10	4	14	10	6
25	Joe Nieuwendyk	C	80	17	28	45	10	56	17	3	6	9	−2	4
11	John Madden	C	80	19	22	41	13	26	24	6	10	16	10	2
28	Brian Rafalski	D	79	3	37	40	18	14	23	2	9	11	7	8
27	Scott Niedermayer	D	81	11	28	39	23	62	24	2	16	18	11	16
14	Brian Gionta	RW	58	12	13	25	5	23	24	1	8	9	5	6
24	Turner Stevenson	RW	77	7	13	20	7	115	14	1	1	2	2	26
4	Scott Stevens	D	81	4	16	20	18	41	24	3	6	9	14	14
18	Sergei Brylin	LW	52	11	8	19	−2	16	19	1	3	4	−4	8
20	Jay Pandolfo	LW	68	6	11	17	12	23	24	6	6	12	9	2
10	Oleg Tverdovsky	D	50	5	8	13	2	22	15	0	3	3	−4	0
5	Colin White	D	72	5	8	13	19	98	24	0	5	5	3	29
19	Jim McKenzie	LW	76	4	8	12	3	88	13	0	0	0	−2	14
9	Jiri Bicek	RW	44	5	6	11	7	25	5	0	0	0	−2	0
17	Christian Berglund	LW	38	4	5	9	3	20	—	—	—	—	—	—
3	Ken Daneyko	D	69	2	7	9	6	33	13	0	0	0	2	2
16	Mike Rupp	C	26	5	3	8	0	21	4	1	3	4	4	0
6	Tommy Albelin	D	37	1	6	7	10	6	16	1	0	1	3	2
21	Pascal Rheaume†	C	21	4	1	5	3	8	24	1	2	3	−2	13
29	Grant Marshall†	RW	10	1	3	4	−3	7	24	6	2	8	3	8
22	Mike Danton	C	17	2	0	2	0	35	—	—	—	—	—	—
8	Steve Guolla	C	12	2	0	2	1	2	—	—	—	—	—	—
2	Richard Smehlik†	D	12	0	2	2	−1	0	5	0	0	0	−2	2
9	Craig Darby	C	3	0	1	1	−1	0	—	—	—	—	—	—
7	Raymond Giroux	D	11	0	1	1	−2	6	—	—	—	—	—	—
7	Andrei Zyuzin‡	D	1	0	1	1	−1	2	—	—	—	—	—	—
30	Martin Brodeur	G	73	0	0	0		10	24	0	1	1		6
35	Corey Schwab	G	11	0	0	0		0	2	0	0	0		0

=== Goaltending ===
No.	Player	Regular season										Playoffs								
No.	Player	GP	W	L	T	SA	GA	GAA	SV%	SO	TOI	GP	W	L	SA	GA	GAA	SV%	SO	TOI
30	Martin Brodeur	73	41	23	9	1706	147	2.02	.914	9	4374	24	16	8	622	41	1.65	.934	7	1491
35	Corey Schwab	11	5	3	1	223	15	1.47	.933	1	614	2	0	0	8	0	0.00	1.000	0	28

== Awards and records ==
=== Awards ===
Martin Brodeur was also a finalist for the Hart Memorial Trophy and John Madden was runner-up for the Frank J. Selke Trophy.

Type	Award/honor	Recipient	Ref
League (annual)	NHL First All-Star Team	Martin Brodeur (Goaltender)	
League (annual)	Vezina Trophy	Martin Brodeur	
League (annual)	William M. Jennings Trophy	Martin Brodeur (Note: Co-winner with Roman Cechmanek and Robert Esche of the Philadelphia Flyers)	
League (in-season)	NHL All-Star Game selection	Martin Brodeur	
League (in-season)	NHL All-Star Game selection	Scott Stevens	
League (in-season)	NHL Player of the Week	Martin Brodeur (January 20)	
Team	Devils' Players' Player	Joe Nieuwendyk	
Team	Hugh Delano Unsung Hero	Jay Pandolfo	
Team	Most Valuable Devil	Martin Brodeur	
Team	Three-Star Award	Martin Brodeur	

=== Milestones ===
Milestone	Player	Date	Ref
First game	Mike Rupp	January 13, 2003	
1,000th point	Joe Nieuwendyk	February 23, 2003	

== Transactions ==
The Devils were involved in the following transactions from June 14, 2002, the day after the deciding game of the 2002 Stanley Cup Finals, through June 9, 2003, the day of the deciding game of the 2003 Stanley Cup Finals.

=== Trades ===
Date	Details		Ref
July 6, 2002	To New Jersey Devils: Maxim Balmochnykh; Jeff Friesen; Oleg Tverdovsky	To Anaheim Mighty Ducks: Mike Commodore; Jean-Francois Damphousse; Petr Sykora; Rights to Igor Pohanka	
January 24, 2003	To New Jersey Devils: Steve Kariya	To Vancouver Canucks: Mikko Jokela	
February 24, 2003	To New Jersey Devils: Pascal Rheaume	To Atlanta Thrashers: Conditional draft pick in 2004	
March 10, 2003	To New Jersey Devils: Grant Marshall	To Columbus Blue Jackets: Conditional draft pick in 2004	
March 10, 2003	To New Jersey Devils: Richard Smehlik; New Jersey's conditional draft pick in 2004	To Atlanta Thrashers: 4th-round pick in 2003	

=== Players acquired ===
Date	Player	Former team	Term	Via	Ref
July 8, 2002	Corey Schwab	Toronto Maple Leafs		Free agency	
July 12, 2002	Alex Brooks	Jokerit (Liiga)		Free agency	
July 12, 2002	Craig Darby	Montreal Canadiens		Free agency	
July 12, 2002	Raymond Giroux	New York Islanders		Free agency	
July 12, 2002	Mike Matteucci	Minnesota Wild		Free agency	
August 26, 2002	Dave Roche	New York Islanders		Free agency	
August 26, 2002	Ken Sutton	New York Islanders		Free agency	
October 1, 2002	Joe Hulbig	Worcester IceCats (AHL)		Free agency	

=== Players lost ===
Date	Player	New team	Via (Note: In parentheses is the player's free agency group on July 1 if applicable.)	Ref
July 1, 2002	Bobby Holik	New York Rangers	Free agency (III)	
July 1, 2002	Mike Rucinski (Note: Rucinski retired.)		Contract expiration (VI)	
August 7, 2002	Joel Bouchard	New York Rangers	Free agency (UFA)	
August 10, 2002	Valeri Kamensky		Retirement (III)	
August 18, 2002	Stephane Richer		Retirement (III)	
August 23, 2002	Sylvain Cloutier	Houston Aeros (AHL)	Free agency (VI)	
August 23, 2002	Stanislav Gron	HC Vitkovice (ELH)	Free agency (II)	
September 18, 2002	Richard Rochefort	Assat (Liiga)	Free agency (VI)	
September 19, 2002	Frederic Henry	Pont-Rouge Caron & Guay (QSPHL)	Free agency (UFA)	
October 14, 2002	Bruce Gardiner	HC Lada Togliatti (RSL)	Free agency (UFA)	
October 15, 2002	Andreas Salomonsson	Washington Capitals	Waivers	
October 2002	Sergei Nemchinov	Lokomotiv Yaroslavl (RSL)	Free agency (III)	
November 2, 2002	Andrei Zyuzin	Minnesota Wild	Waivers	
April 17, 2003	Ken Sutton	ERC Ingolstadt (DEL)	Free agency	

=== Signings ===
Date	Player	Term	Contract type	Ref
July 12, 2002	Chris Hartsburg		Entry-level	
July 12, 2002	Anton Kadeykin		Entry-level	
July 12, 2002	Matus Kostur		Entry-level	
July 12, 2002	Krisjanis Redlihs		Entry-level	
July 15, 2002	Patrik Elias	3-year	Re-signing	
July 23, 2002	Jay Pandolfo	2-year	Re-signing	
September 9, 2002	Rob Skrlac		Re-signing	
September 13, 2002	Jamie Langenbrunner		Re-signing	
September 14, 2002	Scott Gomez	2-year	Re-signing	
September 18, 2002	Scott Clemmensen		Re-signing	
April 9, 2003	David Hale		Entry-level	

== Draft picks ==
The Devils' draft picks at the 2002 NHL entry draft at the Air Canada Centre in Toronto, Ontario.

Round	#	Player	Pos	Nationality	College/Junior/Club team (League)	Notes
1	20	No first-round pick				(Note: The Devils traded their 2001 first-round pick (later transferred to Buffalo and used on Daniel Paille), along with Randy McKay and Jason Arnott for Joe Nieuwendyk and Jamie Langenbrunner on March 19, 2002.)
2	51	Anton Kadeykin	D	Russia	Elemach Elektrostal (Vysshaya Liga)	(Note: Compensatory draft pick awarded by the NHL as compensation for Group III free agent Alexander Mogilny.)
2	53	Barry Tallackson	RW	United States	University of Minnesota (WCHA)	
3	64	Jason Ryznar	LW	United States	University of Michigan (CCHA)	(Note: The Devils acquired the 2002 third-round pick from Atlanta for Phoenix's 2001 fourth-round pick (used on Milan Gajic) and the Devils' 2002 seventh-round pick (later transferred to San Jose and used on Tim Conboy) on June 24, 2001.)
3	84	Marek Chvatal	D	Czech Republic	Oceláři Třinec (Czech Extraliga)	(Note: The Devils had traded their original 2001 third-round pick (used on Beat Schiess-Forster) to Phoenix for the Coyotes' 2002 third-round pick (Marek Chvatal) on June 23, 2001.)
3	85	Ahren Nittel	LW	Canada	Windsor Spitfires (OHL)	
4	117	Cam Janssen	RW	United States	Windsor Spitfires (OHL)	
5	154	Krisjanis Redlihs	D	Latvia	Liepājas Metalurgs (Latvian Hockey League)	
6	187	Eric Johansson	C	Canada	Tri-City Americans (WHL)	
7	218	Ilkka Pikkarainen	RW	Finland	HIFK (SM-liiga)	(Note: Compensatory draft pick awarded by the NHL as compensation for Group III free agent Ken Sutton.)
8	250	Dan Glover	D	Canada	Camrose Kodiaks (AJHL)	
9	281	Bill Kinkel	LW	United States	Kitchener Rangers (OHL)	

== Media ==
Television coverage was carried on Fox Sports Net New York with Mike Emrick and Chico Resch with the play-by-play calling while Matt Loughlin served as the color commentator. The radio broadcasts were on WABC–AM 770, with John Hennessy handling the play-by-play duties with Randy Velischek color commentating.

== See also ==
- 2002–03 NHL season
