= 2003 Stanley Cup Final =

2003 ice hockey championship series

	1	2	3	4	5	6	7	Total
New Jersey Devils	3	3	2*	0*	6	2	3	4
Mighty Ducks of Anaheim	0	0	3*	1*	3	5	0	3
- * – Denotes overtime period(s)
- Location(s): East Rutherford: Continental Airlines Arena (1, 2, 5, 7); Anaheim: Arrowhead Pond of Anaheim (3, 4, 6)
- Coaches: New Jersey: Pat Burns; Anaheim: Mike Babcock
- Captains: New Jersey: Scott Stevens; Anaheim: Paul Kariya
- National anthems: New Jersey: Arlette Roxburgh; Anaheim: United States Marines from Camp Pendleton
- Referees: Dan Marouelli (1, 3, 4, 6, 7); Brad Watson (1, 4, 6); Bill McCreary (2, 3, 5, 7); Paul Devorski (2, 5)
- Dates: May 27 – June 9, 2003
- MVP: Jean-Sebastien Giguere (Mighty Ducks)
- Series-winning goal: Mike Rupp (2:22, second)
- Hall of Famers: Devils: Martin Brodeur (2018); Scott Niedermayer (2013); Joe Nieuwendyk (2011; did not play); Scott Stevens (2007); Mighty Ducks: Paul Kariya (2017); Adam Oates (2012); Coaches: Pat Burns (2014); Officials: Bill McCreary (2014)
- Networks: Canada: (English): CBC (French): RDS; United States: (English): ESPN (1–2), ABC (3–7)
- Announcers: (CBC) Bob Cole and Harry Neale (RDS) Pierre Houde and Yvon Pedneault (ESPN) Gary Thorne and Bill Clement (ABC) Gary Thorne, Bill Clement, and John Davidson (NHL International) Dave Strader and Joe Micheletti

The 2003 Stanley Cup Final was the championship series of the National Hockey League's (NHL) 2002–03 season, and the culmination of the 2003 Stanley Cup playoffs. The second-seeded Eastern Conference champion New Jersey Devils defeated the seventh-seeded Western Conference champion Mighty Ducks of Anaheim in seven games and were awarded the Stanley Cup for the third and most recent time in franchise history. For the first time since 1965, all seven games were won by the home team. To date, this is the last Stanley Cup Final in which that has occurred.

The Devils' win was the last in an era of dominance that they, along with the Colorado Avalanche and the Detroit Red Wings, established in the era from 1995 to 2003. The three teams won a combined eight of nine Stanley Cups during that time. The Devils won in 1995, followed by the Avalanche in 1996, then the Red Wings in 1997 and 1998. The Dallas Stars win in 1999 would be superseded by the Devils in 2000, Colorado in 2001 and Detroit in 2002.

== Paths to the Final ==
=== New Jersey Devils ===
The New Jersey Devils were in the Stanley Cup Final for their fourth time in franchise history, as well as their third appearance in four years. En route to the Final, New Jersey defeated the Boston Bruins and Tampa Bay Lightning in five games, and the Ottawa Senators in the Eastern Conference finals in a seven-game series. Strong goaltending from future Hockey Hall of Fame goaltender Martin Brodeur, and strong defense from future Hockey Hall of Fame captain Scott Stevens and future Hockey Hall of Fame defenseman Scott Niedermayer led the Devils to the Final. Niedermayer and forward Jamie Langenbrunner led all NHL players in points during the entire playoffs. Forwards John Madden and Jeff Friesen, the latter of whom had been traded to New Jersey from Anaheim during the off-season, also finished among the top scorers in the league during the playoffs.

=== Mighty Ducks of Anaheim ===
The Mighty Ducks of Anaheim entered their first Stanley Cup Final in franchise history after upsetting two heavily favored teams: sweeping the defending Stanley Cup champion Detroit Red Wings and defeating the Dallas Stars in six games. Anaheim also swept the Minnesota Wild in the Western Conference finals, largely due to the stellar goaltending of Jean-Sebastien Giguere, who only allowed one goal during the entire series. Supporting Giguere were future Hockey Hall of Fame members Paul Kariya and Adam Oates as well as forwards Petr Sykora and Rob Niedermayer, brother of then-Devils star defenseman Scott Niedermayer.

This series was considered memorable as two brothers on different teams competed against one another for the Stanley Cup. Carol Niedermayer, the mother of Rob and Scott, said she hoped Rob would win because Scott had already won Stanley Cups in 1995 and 2000. Scott said of his mother's statement: "That made sense to me."

== Game summaries ==
Number in parentheses represents the player's total in goals or assists to that point of the entire four rounds of the playoffs

The 2003 Stanley Cup Final pitted the second-seeded Eastern Conference champion New Jersey Devils against the seventh-seeded Western Conference champion Mighty Ducks of Anaheim. The Devils, who finished the season with 108 points, defeated the Mighty Ducks in seven games to win the Stanley Cup. The series opened at Continental Airlines Arena in East Rutherford, New Jersey.

=== Game one ===
May 27	Mighty Ducks of Anaheim	0–3	New Jersey Devils	Continental Airlines Arena	Recap

In game one, Martin Brodeur made 16 saves to hold the Ducks off the scoreboard while the Devils players continually dominated the Ducks. Sergei Brylin scored the winning goal in the second period and the Devils went on to shut out the Mighty Ducks 3–0, with Martin Brodeur recording his fifth shoutout of the postseason.

Scoring summary
Period	Team	Goal	Assist(s)	Time	Score
1st	None				
2nd	NJ	Jeff Friesen (6)	Sergei Brylin (2) and Brian Gionta (4)	01:45	1–0 NJ
3rd	NJ	Grant Marshall (5)	Patrik Elias (6) and Scott Gomez (7)	05:34	2–0 NJ
3rd	NJ	Jeff Friesen (7) – en	Colin White (6) and Martin Brodeur (1)	05:34	3–0 NJ
Penalty summary
Period	Team	Player	Penalty	Time	PIM
1st	NJ	Jim McKenzie	Charging	09:17	2:00
1st	NJ	Colin White	Cross-checking	14:01	2:00
1st	ANA	Keith Carney	Roughing	18:10	2:00
2nd	None				
3rd	None				

Shots by period
Team	1	2	3	Total
Anaheim	4	6	8	16
New Jersey	6	15	9	30

=== Game two ===
May 29	Mighty Ducks of Anaheim	0–3	New Jersey Devils	Continental Airlines Arena	Recap

In a virtual repeat of game one, Patrik Elias scored the winning goal in the second period and the Devils shut out Anaheim 3–0 again.

Scoring summary
Period	Team	Goal	Assist(s)	Time	Score
1st	None				
2nd	NJ	Patrik Elias (3) – pp	Oleg Tverdovsky (2) and Scott Gomez (4)	04:42	1–0 NJ
2nd	NJ	Scott Gomez (2)	Oleg Tverdovsky (3) and Patrik Elias (6)	12:11	2–0 NJ
3rd	NJ	Jeff Friesen (8)	Brian Gionta (5) and Scott Niedermayer (12)	04:22	3–0 NJ
Penalty summary
Period	Team	Player	Penalty	Time	PIM
1st	ANA	Samuel Pahlsson	Interference – Obstruction	06:10	2:00
1st	ANA	Mike Leclerc	Hooking	18:24	2:00
2nd	NJ	Patrik Elias	Holding the stick	02:23	2:00
2nd	ANA	Petr Sykora	Holding	03:19	2:00
3rd	ANA	Keith Carney	High-sticking	00:27	2:00
3rd	NJ	Jim McKenzie	Interference	08:29	2:00
3rd	NJ	Scott Stevens	Holding	19:19	2:00

Shots by period
Team	1	2	3	Total
Anaheim	7	2	7	16
New Jersey	7	6	12	25

=== Game three ===
May 31	New Jersey Devils	2–3	OT	Mighty Ducks of Anaheim	Arrowhead Pond of Anaheim	Recap

Down 2–0 after two games, the series shifted to the Arrowhead Pond of Anaheim in Southern California. Game three was remembered for the clumsy mistake from Martin Brodeur when he accidentally dropped his stick when the puck came to him; the puck deflected off his fallen stick and into the net to give the Ducks a lucky break and a 2–1 lead. The Devils would later tie the game, only to lose in overtime. Over the mistake with his stick, Brodeur later claimed, "It was just one of those once in a lifetime things."

Scoring summary
Period	Team	Goal	Assist(s)	Time	Score
1st	None				
2nd	ANA	Marc Chouinard (1)	Sandis Ozolins (5)	03:39	1–0 ANA
2nd	NJ	Patrik Elias (4)	Jamie Langenbrunner (7) and Brian Rafalski (7)	14:02	1–1
2nd	ANA	Sandis Ozolins (2)	Jean-Sebastien Giguere (1)	14:47	2–1 ANA
3rd	NJ	Scott Gomez (3)	Grant Marshall (2) and Patrik Elias (7)	09:11	2–2
OT	ANA	Ruslan Salei (2)	Adam Oates (7)	06:59	3–2 ANA
Penalty summary
Period	Team	Player	Penalty	Time	PIM
1st	ANA	Steve Thomas	Cross-checking	00:15	2:00
1st	ANA	Mike Leclerc	Boarding	07:49	2:00
1st	ANA	Ruslan Salei	Hooking – Obstruction	08:04	4:00
1st	NJ	Sergei Brylin	Holding the stick	08:04	2:00
1st	NJ	Brian Rafalski	Hooking	08:04	2:00
2nd	ANA	Petr Sykora	Hooking	19:31	2:00
3rd	ANA	Ruslan Salei	Hooking	07:49	2:00
3rd	NJ	Brian Gionta	Slashing	10:35	2:00
OT	None				

Shots by period
Team	1	2	3	OT	Total
New Jersey	8	12	8	3	31
Anaheim	9	9	10	5	33

=== Game four ===
June 2	New Jersey Devils	0–1	OT	Mighty Ducks of Anaheim	Arrowhead Pond of Anaheim	Recap

Game four had no scoring throughout regulation and was a battle between goaltenders Brodeur and Giguere. But Anaheim again came out on top in overtime, winning 1–0 and tying the series 2–2.

Scoring summary
Period	Team	Goal	Assist(s)	Time	Score
1st	None				
2nd	None				
3rd	None				
OT	ANA	Steve Thomas (3)	Samuel Pahlsson (13) and Sandis Ozolins (6)	00:39	1–0 ANA
Penalty summary
Period	Team	Player	Penalty	Time	PIM
1st	ANA	Kurt Sauer	Interference	05:54	2:00
1st	NJ	Scott Niedermayer	Holding	07:15	2:00
1st	ANA	Dan Bylsma	Goaltender interference	05:54	2:00
2nd	ANA	Rob Niedermayer	Hooking	08:50	2:00
3rd	None				
OT	None				

Shots by period
Team	1	2	3	OT	Total
New Jersey	10	8	7	1	26
Anaheim	7	8	9	2	26

=== Game five ===
June 5	Mighty Ducks of Anaheim	3–6	New Jersey Devils	Continental Airlines Arena	Recap

Game five, returning to the Meadowlands, saw a continual battle for the first half of the game. With the game tied 3–3 in the second period, the Devils took the lead with a deflection goal by Jay Pandolfo that was initially waved off by referees due to an apparent kicking motion with the skates. Video replays, however, showed that there was no distinct kicking motion from the skates, and thus the referees' call was reversed, resulting in a goal. This would prove to deflate the Ducks for the rest of the game, as Jamie Langenbrunner scored two more goals for the Devils to give New Jersey a 6–3 win and a three games to two series lead.

Scoring summary
Period	Team	Goal	Assist(s)	Time	Score
1st	ANA	Petr Sykora (3)	Adam Oates (8)	00:42	1–0 ANA
1st	NJ	Pascal Rheaume (1)	Turner Stevenson (1) and Sergei Brylin (3)	03:35	1–1
1st	NJ	Patrik Elias (5) – pp	Brian Rafalski (8) and Scott Gomez (9)	07:45	2–1 NJ
1st	ANA	Steve Rucchin (5)	Petr Sykora (7) and Paul Kariya (4)	12:50	2–2
2nd	NJ	Brian Gionta (1)	Jay Pandolfo (6) and Scott Niedermayer (13)	03:12	3–2 NJ
2nd	ANA	Samuel Pahlsson (2)	Rob Niedermayer (6) and Keith Carney (3)	06:35	3–3
2nd	NJ	Jay Pandolfo (5)	Brian Gionta (6) and Scott Stevens (5)	09:02	4–3 NJ
3rd	NJ	Jamie Langenbrunner (10)	Mike Rupp (1) and Scott Niedermayer (14)	05:39	5–3 NJ
3rd	NJ	Jamie Langenbrunner (11)	Brian Gionta (7)	12:52	6–3 NJ
Penalty summary
Period	Team	Player	Penalty	Time	PIM
1st	ANA	Adam Oates	Roughing	04:34	2:00
1st	NJ	Scott Niedermayer	Roughing	04:34	2:00
1st	ANA	Keith Carney	Tripping	07:03	2:00
1st	NJ	Turner Stevenson	Roughing	14:34	2:00
1st	ANA	Mike Leclerc	Roughing	17:50	2:00
2nd	ANA	Adam Oates	High-sticking	00:18	2:00
2nd	ANA	Stanislav Chistov	High-sticking	06:39	2:00
3rd	ANA	Ruslan Salei	Roughing	11:52	2:00
3rd	NJ	Grant Marshall	Roughing	11:52	2:00

Shots by period
Team	1	2	3	Total
Anaheim	12	7	4	23
New Jersey	11	13	13	37

=== Game six ===
June 7	New Jersey Devils	2–5	Mighty Ducks of Anaheim	Arrowhead Pond of Anaheim	Recap

With New Jersey looking to clinch the series and win the Stanley Cup in Anaheim, game six saw the Mighty Ducks return the favor of game five to the Devils with complete dominance throughout the game. Quite possibly the most remembered moment of the entire series came when the Ducks were winning 3–1 in the second period. Ducks captain Paul Kariya failed to see Devils captain Scott Stevens approaching after he passed the puck, and he was subsequently checked by the defensemen in a hit similar to the check that knocked out Eric Lindros during the 2000 playoffs and caused Lindros to miss the next season. The hit gave Kariya a severe concussion, and he laid motionless on the ice for a few minutes, where he was then escorted to the locker room. Kariya, however, unexpectedly returned to the bench minutes later. About 11 minutes after the hit, Kariya fired a slapshot that got past Martin Brodeur. After Petr Sykora scored a power play goal three minutes and fifty-seven seconds into the third, New Jersey head coach Pat Burns was prompted to replace Brodeur with backup goaltender Corey Schwab. The Ducks won the game 5–2 and sent the series to a seventh and final game.

Years later, Paul Kariya said that he has no memory of the rest of the series following the hit he suffered at the hands of Scott Stevens in game 6. This is despite the fact that he returned to play in game 6 (where he scored his famous goal) and game 7.

Scoring summary
Period	Team	Goal	Assist(s)	Time	Score
1st	ANA	Steve Rucchin (6)	Paul Kariya (5) and Petr Sykora (8)	04:26	1–0 ANA
1st	ANA	Steve Rucchin (7)	Mike Leclerc (9) and Rob Niedermayer (7)	13:42	2–0 ANA
1st	ANA	Steve Thomas (5) – pp	Paul Kariya (6) and Keith Carney (9)	15:59	3–0 ANA
2nd	NJ	Jay Pandolfo (6)	John Madden (10) and Brian Gionta (8)	02:18	3–1 ANA
2nd	ANA	Paul Kariya (6)	Petr Sykora (9) and Adam Oates (9)	17:15	4–1 ANA
2nd	ANA	Petr Sykora (4) – pp	Stanislav Chistov (10) and Niclas Havelid (4)	03:57	5–1 ANA
2nd	NJ	Grant Marshall (6) – pp	Brian Rafalski (9) and Patrik Elias (8)	10:46	5–2 ANA
Penalty summary
Period	Team	Player	Penalty	Time	PIM
1st	NJ	Patrik Elias	Interference – Obstruction	08:55	2:00
1st	ANA	Ruslan Salei	Roughing	14:24	2:00
1st	NJ	Jamie Langenbrunner	Roughing – double minor	14:24	4:00
1st	NJ	Paul Kariya	Tripping	18:39	2:00
2nd	NJ	Jamie Langenbrunner	Hooking	06:26	2:00
2nd	NJ	Turner Stevenson	Slashing	18:27	2:00
3rd	NJ	Turner Stevenson	Roughing – double minor	01:15	4:00
3rd	ANA	Jason Krog	High-sticking	06:26	2:00
3rd	ANA	Samuel Pahlsson	Tripping	09:32	2:00
3rd	NJ	Pascal Rheaume	Clipping	14:45	2:00
3rd	NJ	Grant Marshall	Tripping – Obstruction	18:51	2:00
3rd	ANA	Steve Thomas	Roughing	19:59	2:00
3rd	NJ	Colin White	Roughing	19:59	2:00

Shots by period
Team	1	2	3	Total
New Jersey	9	10	9	28
Anaheim	9	10	5	24

=== Game seven ===
June 9	Mighty Ducks of Anaheim	0–3	New Jersey Devils	Continental Airlines Arena	Recap

Game seven in New Jersey saw the Devils once more completely dominate the Ducks. The game-winning goal was scored on a deflection by Mike Rupp. Rupp became the first player in Stanley Cup history to have his first playoff goal be the Stanley Cup winner. Martin Brodeur made 24 saves in net for New Jersey to record his seventh shutout of the postseason, breaking Dominik Hasek's record for the most shutouts by a goaltender in a single postseason. a Additionally, Jeff Friesen dominated his former Mighty Duck teammates, scoring the game's final two goals to seal the victory, and give New Jersey its third Cup in nine years.

Scoring summary
Period	Team	Goal	Assist(s)	Time	Score
1st	None				
2nd	NJ	Mike Rupp (1)	Scott Niedermayer (15) and Colin White (5)	02:22	1–0 NJ
2nd	NJ	Jeff Friesen (9)	Mike Rupp (2) and Scott Niedermayer (16)	12:18	2–0 NJ
3rd	NJ	Jeff Friesen (10)	Mike Rupp (3) and Scott Stevens (16)	16:16	3–0 NJ
Penalty summary
Period	Team	Player	Penalty	Time	PIM
1st	NJ	Turner Stevenson	Boarding	17:31	2:00
2nd	ANA	Rob Niedermayer	Interference – Obstruction	03:58	2:00
3rd	ANA	Mike Leclerc	Cross-checking	16:45	2:00

Shots by period
Team	1	2	3	Total
Anaheim	5	9	10	24
New Jersey	7	12	6	25

The 3–0 win gave the Devils their third Stanley Cup victory, and ended Anaheim's Cinderella run.

The Mighty Ducks, however, didn't leave empty-handed; for his stellar play throughout the playoffs and Final, goaltender Jean-Sebastien Giguere was awarded the Conn Smythe Trophy as the most valuable player (MVP) of the playoffs. He became only the fifth player, and fourth goaltender, in NHL history to have won the trophy as a member of the losing team, joining Detroit's Roger Crozier (1966), the St. Louis Blues' Glenn Hall (1968), and the Philadelphia Flyers' Reggie Leach (1976, a right winger) and Ron Hextall (1987). He was the last player to win the Conn Smythe trophy on a losing team until the Edmonton Oilers' Connor McDavid did so in 2024. To date, Giguere is the last goaltender to win the Conn Smythe trophy on a losing team.

This was only the third time in NHL history, after 1955 and 1965, that the home team won every Final game. It has not happened since.

To date, this is the Devils' last Stanley Cup championship. They appeared in the Final again in 2012, when Elias and Brodeur were the only members of the 2003 team remaining. They lost in six games to the Los Angeles Kings.

The Ducks would return to the Final in 2007, where they defeated the Ottawa Senators in five games, giving the franchise their first (and to date only) Stanley Cup championship.

== Team rosters ==
Years indicated in boldface under the "Finals appearance" column signify that the player won the Stanley Cup in the given year.

=== Mighty Ducks of Anaheim ===
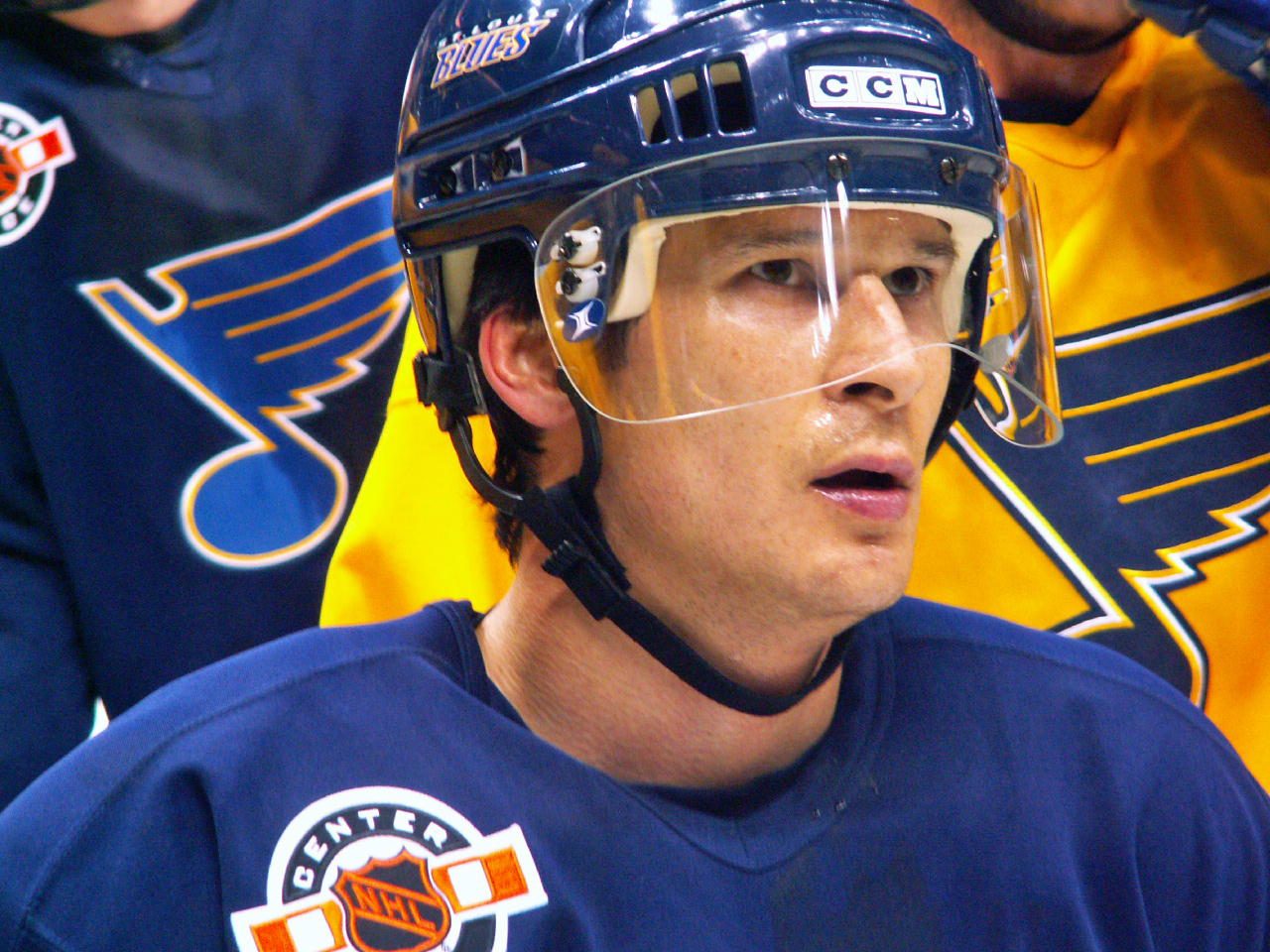
Paul Kariya (pictured in 2008) captained the Mighty Ducks to their first Final appearance in franchise history.

#	Nat	Player	Position	Hand	Acquired	Place of birth	Finals appearance
21	(United States)	Dan Bylsma	RW	L	2000–01	Grand Haven, Michigan	first
3	(United States)	Keith Carney – **A**	D	L	2001–02	Providence, Rhode Island	first
23	(Russia)	Stanislav Chistov	LW	R	2001	Chelyabinsk, Soviet Union	first
11	(Canada)	Marc Chouinard	C	R	1995–96	Charlesbourg, Quebec	first
29	(Switzerland)	Martin Gerber	G	L	2002–03	Burgdorf, Switzerland	first
35	(Canada)	Jean-Sebastien Giguere	G	L	2000–01	Montreal, Quebec	first
28	(Sweden)	Niclas Havelid	D	L	1999	Stockholm, Sweden	first
9	(Canada)	Paul Kariya – **C**	LW	L	1993	North Vancouver, British Columbia	first
10	(Canada)	Jason Krog	C	R	2002–03	Fernie, British Columbia	first
12	(Canada)	Mike Leclerc	LW	L	1995	Winnipeg, Manitoba	first
44	(Canada)	Rob Niedermayer	LW	L	2002–03	Cassiar, British Columbia	second (1996)
77	(Canada)	Adam Oates	C	R	2002–03	Weston, Ontario	second (1998)
2	(Sweden)	Fredrik Olausson	D	R	2002–03	Nybro, Sweden	second (**2002**)
8	(Latvia)	Sandis Ozolinsh	D	L	2002–03	Riga, Soviet Union	second (**1996**)
26	(Sweden)	Samuel Pahlsson	C	L	2000–01	Ånge, Sweden	first
20	(Canada)	Steve Rucchin – (**A**)	C	L	1994	Thunder Bay, Ontario	first
24	(Belarus)	Ruslan Salei	D	L	1996	Minsk, Soviet Union	first
34	(United States)	Kurt Sauer	D	R	2000	St. Cloud, Minnesota	first
22	(Russia)	Alexei Smirnov	LW	L	2000	Kalinin, Soviet Union	first
39	(Czech Republic)	Petr Sykora	RW	L	2002–03	Plzeň, Czechoslovakia	third (**2000**, 2001)
32	(Canada)	Steve Thomas	RW	L	2002–03	Stockport, England	first
5	(Russia)	Vitaly Vishnevskiy	D	L	1998	Kharkiv, Soviet Union	first

=== New Jersey Devils ===
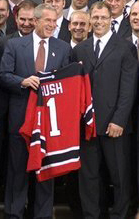
Scott Stevens captained the Devils to their fourth Final appearance in franchise history.

#	Nat	Player	Position	Hand	Acquired	Place of birth	Finals appearance
6	(Sweden)	Tommy Albelin	D	L	2001–02	Stockholm, Sweden	second (**1995**)
9	(Slovakia)	Jiri Bicek	RW	L	1997	Košice, Czechoslovakia	first
30	(Canada)	Martin Brodeur	G	L	1990	Montreal, Quebec	fourth (**1995**, **2000**, 2001)
18	(Russia)	Sergei Brylin	LW/C	L	1992	Moscow, Soviet Union	fourth (**1995**, **2000**, 2001)
3	(Canada)	Ken Daneyko	D	L	1982	Windsor, Ontario	fourth (**1995**, **2000**, 2001)
26	(Czech Republic)	Patrik Elias – **A**	LW	L	1994	Třebíč, Czechoslovakia	third (**2000**, 2001)
12	(Canada)	Jeff Friesen	LW	L	2002–03	Meadow Lake, Saskatchewan	first
14	(United States)	Brian Gionta	RW	R	1998	Rochester, New York	first
23	(United States)	Scott Gomez	C	L	1998	Anchorage, Alaska	third (**2000**, 2001)
15	(United States)	Jamie Langenbrunner	RW	R	2001–02	Cloquet, Minnesota	third (**1999**, 2000)
11	(Canada)	John Madden	C	L	1997–98	Toronto, Ontario	third (**2000**, 2001)
29	(Canada)	Grant Marshall	RW	R	2002–03	Port Credit, Ontario	third (**1999**, 2000)
19	(Canada)	Jim McKenzie	LW	L	2000–01	Gull Lake, Saskatchewan	second (2001)
27	(Canada)	Scott Niedermayer – **A**	D	L	1991	Edmonton, Alberta	fourth (**1995**, **2000**, 2001)
25	(Canada)	Joe Nieuwendyk	C	L	2001–02	Oshawa, Ontario	fourth (did not play; **1989**, **1999**, 2000)
20	(United States)	Jay Pandolfo	LW	L	1993	Winchester, Massachusetts	third (**2000**, 2001)
28	(United States)	Brian Rafalski	D	R	1999–2000	Dearborn, Michigan	third (**2000**, 2001)
21	(Canada)	Pascal Rheaume	C	L	2002–03	Quebec City, Quebec	first
16	(United States)	Michael Rupp	RW	R	2000	Cleveland, Ohio	first
35	(Canada)	Corey Schwab	G	L	2002–03	North Battleford, Saskatchewan	first
2	(Czech Republic)	Richard Smehlik	D	L	2002–03	Ostrava, Czechoslovakia	second (did not play; 1999)
4	(Canada)	Scott Stevens – **C**	D	L	1991–92	Kitchener, Ontario	fourth (**1995**, **2000**, 2001)
24	(Canada)	Turner Stevenson	RW	R	2000–01	Prince George, British Columbia	second (2001)
10	(Russia)	Oleg Tverdovsky	D	L	2002–03	Donetsk, Soviet Union	first
5	(Canada)	Colin White	D	L	1996	New Glasgow, Nova Scotia	third (**2000**, 2001)

== Stanley Cup engraving ==
The 2003 Stanley Cup was presented to Devils captain Scott Stevens by NHL Commissioner Gary Bettman following the Devils 3–0 win over the Mighty Ducks in game seven.

2002–03 New Jersey Devils

=== Players ===
Centres

- 11 John Madden
- 21 Pascal Rheaume
- 23 Scott Gomez
- 25 Joe Nieuwendyk †

Wingers

- 9 Jiri Bicek
- 12 Jeff Friesen
- 14 Brian Gionta
- 15 Jamie Langenbrunner
- 16 Michael Rupp
- 18 Sergei Brylin*
- 19 Jim McKenzie
- 20 Jay Pandolfo
- 24 Turner Stevenson
- 26 Patrik Elias (A)
- 29 Grant Marshall

Defencemen

- 2Richard Smehlik ‡
- 3 Ken Daneyko
- 4 Scott Stevens (Captain)
- 5 Colin White
- 6 Tommy Albelin
- 10 Oleg Tverdovsky
- 27 Scott Niedermayer (A)
- 28 Brian Rafalski

Goaltenders

- 30 Martin Brodeur
- 35 Corey Schwab
- * Played both centre and wing.
- † Did not play or dress in the Final. (Note: 1. 25 Joe Nieuwendyk (C) missed the entire Final due to injury.)
- ‡ Exemption granted to engrave the name of a player who did not automatically qualify. (Note: Automatic qualification for a player's name to be engraved on the Stanley Cup: Playing in (for a goaltender, dressing for) at least one Stanley Cup Final game or at least half of regular season games for the Stanley Cup winning team.)

=== Coaching and administrative staff ===
- Ray Chambers (owner/governor), Lewis Katz (owner), Peter Simon (chairman), Lou Lamoriello (chief executive officer/president/general manager)
- Pat Burns (head coach), Bobby Carpenter Jr. (assistant coach), John MacLean (assistant coach), Jacques Caron (goaltending coach), Larry Robinson (special assignment coach)
- David Conte (director, scouting), Claude Carrier (assistant director, scouting), Chris Lamoriello (scout/AHL GM), Milt Fisher (scout), Dan Labraaten (scout)
- Marcel Pronovost (scout), Bob Hoffmeyer (scout), Jan Ludvig (scout), Dr. Barry Fisher (head team physician)
- Chris Modrzynski (vice-president), Terry Farmer (vice-president, ticket operations), Vladimir Bure (fitness consultant), Taran Singleton (director – hockey operations/video coordinator)
- Bill Murray (medical trainer), Michael Vasalani (strength & conditioning coordinator), Rich Matthews (equipment manager)
- Juergen Merz (massage therapists), Alex Abasto (asst. equipment), Joe Murray (equipment asst.)

=== Engraving notes ===
- #2 Richard Smehlik (D) played in 12 regular-season games and 5 playoff games, but none in the Final. As he did not automatically qualify, New Jersey successfully requested an exemption to have his name engraved on the Stanley Cup.
- Marcel Pronovost won his eighth Stanley Cup – five as a player with Detroit in 1950, 1952, 1954–55 and Toronto in 1967, as well as three championships as a scout for New Jersey in 1995, 2000 and 2003. He set the record for the years between his first and last Stanley Cup wins with 53 years.
- Jeff Friesen was the first player engraved on the Stanley Cup with a full middle name, as "JEFF DARYL FRIESEN." Some players in the past had their middle initial included along with their first name on the Stanley Cup. The 2003 New Jersey team included nine other players who were listed with an initial and 2 full names.
- When Louise St. Jacques engraved the replica Stanley Cup, she realized she had left too much space between winning teams. So to make sure there was enough room on the Stanley Cup for the 2004 winning team, two names were changed: Jacques J. Caron was changed to J.J.Caron, and Larry Robinson was changed to L.Robinson (see 2004 Stanley Cup Final)
- New Jersey won three Stanley Cups – 1995, 2000, and 2003. These players and staff were members of all three Stanley Cup championships. Martin Brodeur, Sergei Brylin, Ken Daneyko, Scott Niedermayer, Scott Stevens, Bobby Carpenter Jr. (one as a player, two as an assistant coach), Lou Lamoriello, Larry Robinson, Jacques Caron, Claude Carrier, David Conte, Milt Fisher, Dan Labraaten, Marcel Provonost, Mike Vasalani, Peter McMullen (left Cup in 2003).

== Broadcasting ==
In the United States, the Disney-owned networks ESPN and ABC aired the Final. Gary Thorne, and Bill Clement called the entire series, with John Davidson joining them for the ABC games. ESPN aired the first two games while ABC broadcast the rest of the series.

This was also the only year that ABC broadcast both the Stanley Cup and the NBA Finals that involved teams playing in the same arena during each series. During ABC's broadcast of game 7, Thorne thanked Brad Nessler, ABC's lead NBA voice, for promoting the game after he stated during game 3 of the NBA Finals that ABC was in a unique situation getting ready for both game 7 and their game the night before.

In Canada, Bob Cole and Harry Neale were in the broadcast booth for CBC. One of the CBC's owned and operated Station's in New Brunswick (CBAT-TV) decided to preempt game seven of the Final in order to broadcast the New Brunswick general election returns. This would also be the first Final televised by RDS, replacing SRC as the Canadian French-language broadcaster.

For the radio coverage, Devils team broadcaster John Hennessy called the series on WABC–AM 770 in New York City. In Anaheim, Steve Carroll called the series.

== Notes ==
Preceded by Detroit Red Wings; 2002	New Jersey Devils; Stanley Cup champions 2003	Succeeded by Tampa Bay Lightning; 2004
