= Grant Marshall =

Canadian ice hockey player (born 1973)

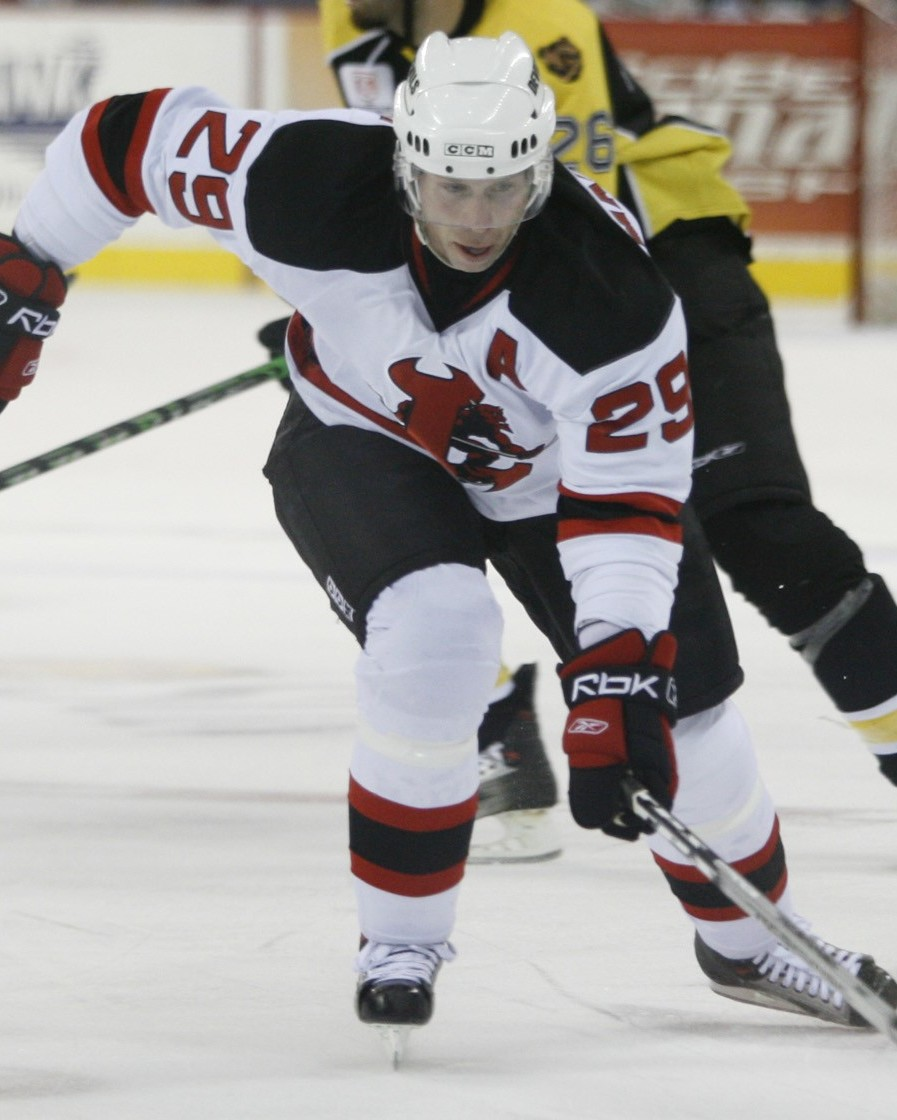
- Marshall with the Lowell Devils
- Born: June 9, 1973 (age 53) Port Credit, Ontario, Canada
- Height: 6 ft 1 in (185 cm)
- Weight: 185 lb (84 kg; 13 st 3 lb)
- Position: Right wing
- Shot: Right
- Played for: Dallas Stars; Columbus Blue Jackets; New Jersey Devils
- NHL draft: 23rd overall, 1992; Toronto Maple Leafs
- Playing career: 1992–2008

Grant W. Marshall (born June 9, 1973) is a Canadian former ice hockey right winger. He played 11 seasons in the National Hockey League, for the Dallas Stars, Columbus Blue Jackets, and New Jersey Devils. He last played for the Devils' minor league affiliate, the Lowell Devils, during the 2007–08 season. Marshall won two Stanley Cup championships during his career, one with the Stars in 1999 and one with the Devils in 2003. He currently works on behalf of the Devils Alumni Association.

== Career ==
Born in Port Credit, Ontario, Marshall was drafted 23rd overall by the Toronto Maple Leafs in the 1992 NHL entry draft. Marshall has played 700 career NHL games, scoring 92 goals and 147 assists for 239 points. His name was engraved on the Stanley Cup with the Dallas Stars in 1999 as well as with the New Jersey Devils in 2003. He scored the series-clinching goal in game five of the Eastern Conference Semi-Finals against the Tampa Bay Lightning in triple overtime. He also assisted on Jeff Friesen's series clinching goal in the Eastern Conference Final.

On December 4, 1990, Marshall was checked from behind into the boards in a game vs. the Sudbury Wolves. He suffered temporary paralysis but made a full recovery, and was able make it to the NHL roster.

On September 8, 2008, it was announced that he would be retiring and would remain in the Devils' organization working for the team's alumni.

== Personal life ==
Marshall sparked controversy in 1996 when he was charged for the sexual assault of a woman at a Winnipeg house party alongside Stars teammate Todd Harvey and two other men who were not NHL players. All four men were charged and released.

== Career statistics ==
			Regular season					Playoffs
Season	Team	League	GP	G	A	Pts	PIM	GP	G	A	Pts	PIM
1989–90	Toronto Nationals AAA	MTHL	39	15	28	43	56	—	—	—	—	—
1990–91	Ottawa 67's	OHL	26	6	11	17	25	1	0	0	0	0
1991–92	Ottawa 67's	OHL	61	32	51	83	132	11	6	11	17	11
1992–93	Ottawa 67's	OHL	30	14	28	42	83	—	—	—	—	—
1992–93	Newmarket Royals	OHL	31	12	25	37	85	7	4	7	11	20
1992–93	St. John's Maple Leafs	AHL	2	0	0	0	0	2	0	0	0	2
1993–94	St. John's Maple Leafs	AHL	67	11	29	40	155	11	1	5	6	17
1994–95	Kalamazoo Wings	IHL	61	17	29	46	96	16	9	3	12	27
1994–95	Dallas Stars	NHL	2	0	1	1	0	—	—	—	—	—
1995–96	Dallas Stars	NHL	70	9	19	28	111	—	—	—	—	—
1996–97	Dallas Stars	NHL	56	6	4	10	98	5	0	2	2	8
1997–98	Dallas Stars	NHL	72	9	10	19	96	17	0	2	2	47
1998–99	Dallas Stars	NHL	82	13	18	31	85	14	0	3	3	20
1999–2000	Dallas Stars	NHL	45	2	6	8	38	14	0	1	1	4
2000–01	Dallas Stars	NHL	75	13	24	37	64	9	0	0	0	0
2001–02	Columbus Blue Jackets	NHL	81	15	18	33	86	—	—	—	—	—
2002–03	Columbus Blue Jackets	NHL	66	8	20	28	71	—	—	—	—	—
2002–03	New Jersey Devils	NHL	10	1	3	4	7	24	6	2	8	8
2003–04	New Jersey Devils	NHL	65	8	7	15	67	—	—	—	—	—
2005–06	New Jersey Devils	NHL	76	8	17	25	70	7	0	1	1	8
2006–07	Lowell Devils	AHL	59	8	16	24	31	—	—	—	—	—
2007–08	Lowell Devils	AHL	66	5	32	37	24	—	—	—	—	—
NHL totals			700	92	147	239	793	90	6	11	17	95

== Awards ==
- 1999 Stanley Cup Champion
- 2003 Stanley Cup Champion

Preceded by Brandon Convery	Toronto Maple Leafs first-round draft pick 1992	Succeeded by Kenny Jönsson
