= Jamie Langenbrunner =

American ice hockey player (born 1975)

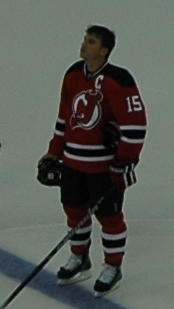
- Langenbrunner with the New Jersey Devils in 2008
- Born: July 24, 1975 (age 51) Duluth, Minnesota, U.S.
- Height: 6 ft 1 in (185 cm)
- Weight: 200 lb (91 kg; 14 st 4 lb)
- Position: Right wing
- Shot: Right
- Played for: Dallas Stars; New Jersey Devils; ERC Ingolstadt; St. Louis Blues
- National team: United States
- NHL draft: 35th overall, 1993; Dallas Stars
- Playing career: 1995–2013
- Website: www.jl15.com

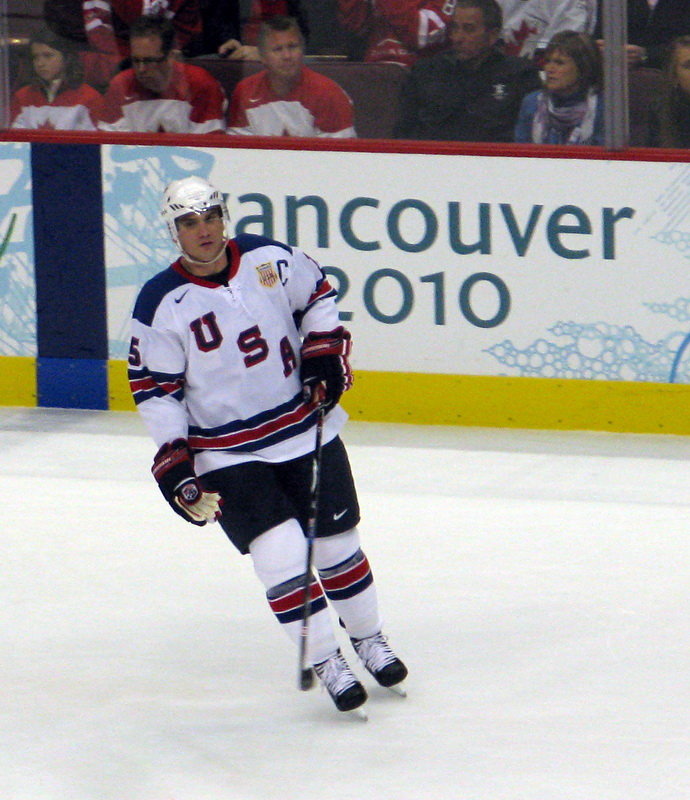
Langenbrunner during a stoppage against Canada at the 2010 Winter Olympics

Jamie Craig Langenbrunner (/ˈlæŋɡənbrʌnər/; born July 24, 1975) is an American former professional ice hockey player. He is a member of the 1998–99 Dallas Stars and 2002–03 New Jersey Devils teams that won the Stanley Cup, and was the captain of the silver medal-winning United States national team in the 2010 Winter Olympics. He currently serves as Special Assistant to the General Manager for the Nashville Predators.

== Playing career ==
=== Junior ===
In high school, Langenbrunner played for the Cloquet Lumberjacks in the Minnesota State High School Hockey League.

After scoring 148 points in 70 games during his freshmen, sophomore and junior years in high school and leading the Lumberjacks to back-to-back State Tournament appearances, Langenbrunner was named the AP's Minnesota High School Hockey Player of the Year. Following a spectacular State Tournament performance, Langenbrunner was drafted out of Cloquet 35th overall in the 1993 NHL entry draft by the Dallas Stars.

Langenbrunner would then forego playing his senior year of high school ice hockey and instead played his next two seasons with the Peterborough Petes of the Ontario Hockey League (OHL), recording 75 goals and 115 assists for 190 points in only 124 games. He additionally tallied 12 goals and 20 assists for 32 points in 18 playoff games. In his second year in Peterborough (during the 1994–95 season), he made his NHL debut with the Dallas Stars.

=== Professional ===
The following year, during the 1995–96 season, he played 59 games with the Michigan K-Wings of the International Hockey League (IHL), scoring 25 goals and notching 40 assists for 65 points, while tallying 13 points in 10 playoff games. His impressive numbers earned him the team's MVP award and also got him called up to the NHL, where he played 12 games that year.

==== Dallas Stars ====
Langenbrunner made his NHL debut on April 9, 1995, skating with Dallas in a game against the St. Louis Blues, but he did not become an NHL regular until the 1996–97 season, when he played 76 games and scored 39 points playing on the left wing. For his strong first-year efforts, he was named a candidate for the Calder Memorial Trophy, given annually to the NHL's Rookie of the Year. Langenbrunner, however, was ultimately edged-out by Bryan Berard of the New York Islanders for the honor.

During the 1997–98 season, Langenbrunner reached the 20-goal plateau, scoring 23 goals and 29 assists for 52 points while playing in 81 games. That year, Langenbrunner also represented his country at the 1998 Winter Olympics, though the Americans fell short of winning a medal.

In the 1998–99 season, Langenbrunner played in 75 games, scoring 12 goals and adding 33 assists for 45 total points. However, his real breakthrough came in the 1999 Stanley Cup playoffs, where he scored 10 goals and had 17 points, while winning his and Dallas' first Stanley Cup over the Buffalo Sabres. He was third in scoring for the Stars, behind Mike Modano and that year's Conn Smythe Trophy winner, Joe Nieuwendyk.

==== New Jersey Devils ====
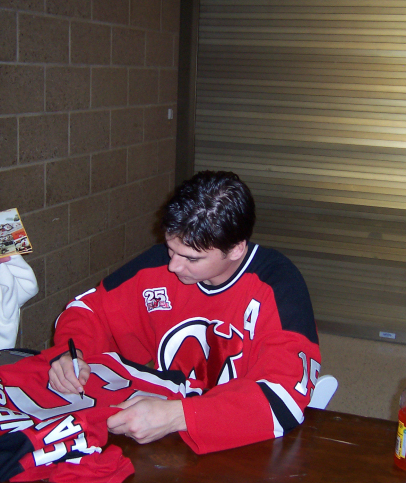
Langenbrunner signing jerseys for fans at the Continental Airlines Arena, circa 2006–07

On March 19, 2002, Langenbrunner was traded with Nieuwendyk to the New Jersey Devils for Jason Arnott, Randy McKay and a first-round draft pick. The next season, in 2002–03, Langenbrunner had a then career-best 22 goals and 33 assists for 55 points in 78 games for the Devils. He continued his scoring numbers in the playoffs, leading the league in goals (11) and points (18) en route to his second Stanley Cup in a 4–3 series victory versus the Mighty Ducks of Anaheim.

Langenbrunner's name close-up on the Stanley Cup

After both an injury-plagued season in 2003–04 in which Langenbrunner played only 53 games and the NHL's lockout season in 2004–05, Langenbrunner bounced back strongly in 2005–06, scoring 53 points in 80 games. He again had a strong playoff performance, scoring 13 points in nine games before the Devils lost to the eventual Stanley Cup champions, the Carolina Hurricanes, in the conference semifinals.

On July 1, 2006, signed a five-year, $14 million contract extension with the Devils worth an annual average of $2.8 million. During the 2006–07 season, Langenbrunner scored a career-best 60 points, where he also played in all 82 games that season, scoring 23 goals and adding 37 assists (both career bests). In the 2007 playoffs, Langenbrunner again played well, scoring eight points in 11 games before losing to the Stanley Cup Final-bound Ottawa Senators.

On December 5, 2007, Langenbrunner was named captain of the New Jersey Devils. That year, however, Langenbrunner missed nearly 20 games to a groin injury and his stats dipped as he scored 41 points in 64 games. In the 2008 playoffs, the Devils lost in the conference quarterfinals to the New York Rangers 4–1, though Langenbrunner played well, scoring four points in the short series.

Beginning in the 2007–08 season, Langenbrunner played on a line with teammates Zach Parise and Travis Zajac. The line was dubbed "ZZ Pops" due to the difference in age between the veteran and the two youngsters who have initials with the letter "Z."

In January 2009, Langenbrunner scored two goals in each of three consecutive games, including three game winners for the Devils. Two of those game-winning goals were scored in overtime. His streak of three consecutive multi-goal games with a game-winning goal was last accomplished by Wayne Gretzky during the 1981–82 season. Langenbrunner played extremely well in the second half of the season and went on to set career highs in goals (29), assists (40), points (69) and plus-minus rating (+25). Langenbrunner, along with fellow linemates Parise and Zajac, all had remarkable seasons, as the line combined for 94 goals and 131 assists for a total of 225 points as well as having a combined plus-minus of +88.

On January 2, 2010, Langenbrunner scored the first hat-trick of his career while playing against the Minnesota Wild in his home state of Minnesota as the Devils defeated the Wild 5–3.

==== Return to Dallas ====
On January 7, 2011, Langenbrunner was traded to the Dallas Stars for a conditional third-round pick in the 2011 NHL entry draft. The pick would become a second-round pick if the Stars either win a playoff round or re-sign Langenbrunner before the draft. He would score his first goal in his return to Dallas in his 1,000th career game, which was against the Los Angeles Kings on January 17, 2011, as the Stars defeated the Kings 2–1.

==== St. Louis Blues ====
Langenbrunner signed a one-year contract as a free agent with the St. Louis Blues on July 6, 2011. In his first season with the Blues, in 2011–12, Langenbrunner added depth to the team and was used primarily as a checking line forward, scoring six goals and 24 points in 70 games. He was re-signed to a one-year extension with St. Louis on July 10, 2012.

In the lockout-shortened 2012–13 season, Langenbrunner participated in only four games with the Blues, posting one assist before an ongoing torn labrum in his left hip required season-ending surgery on February 9, 2013.

==== Retirement ====
On January 15, 2014, Langenbrunner announced his retirement after 16 seasons in the NHL. He joined the Boston Bruins on September 12, 2015, as the team's player development coach.

== Personal life ==
Langenbrunner was born in Duluth, Minnesota in 1975; the family lived in Moose Lake, Minnesota, at the time. When he was one-year-old, the family moved for a short time to Moorhead before moving to International Falls in 1979. Langenbrunner was well into his skating career by age five. They moved to Cloquet in 1985.

Langenbrunner and his wife have three children (one daughter and two sons). His son, Mason, was drafted 151st overall in the 2020 NHL entry draft by the Boston Bruins. While with the Devils, Langenbrunner lived in North Caldwell, New Jersey.

In December 2023 Langenbrunner was elected to the U.S. Hockey Hall of Fame alongside Dustin Brown, Brian Burke, Katie King Crowley and Brian Murphy.

== Career statistics ==
=== Regular season and playoffs ===
			Regular season					Playoffs
Season	Team	League	GP	G	A	Pts	PIM	GP	G	A	Pts	PIM
1990–91	Cloquet High School	HS-MN	20	6	16	22	8	—	—	—	—	—
1991–92	Cloquet High School	HS-MN	23	16	23	39	24	—	—	—	—	—
1992–93	Cloquet High School	HS-MN	27	27	62	89	18	—	0	3	3	—
1993–94	Peterborough Petes	OHL	62	33	58	91	53	7	4	6	10	2
1994–95	Peterborough Petes	OHL	62	42	57	99	84	11	8	14	22	12
1994–95	Dallas Stars	NHL	2	0	0	0	2	—	—	—	—	—
1994–95	Kalamazoo Wings	IHL	—	—	—	—	—	11	1	3	4	2
1995–96	Michigan K-Wings	IHL	59	25	40	65	129	10	3	10	13	8
1995–96	Dallas Stars	NHL	12	2	2	4	6	—	—	—	—	—
1996–97	Dallas Stars	NHL	76	13	26	39	51	5	1	1	2	14
1997–98	Dallas Stars	NHL	81	23	29	52	61	16	1	4	5	14
1998–99	Dallas Stars	NHL	75	12	33	45	62	23	10	7	17	16
1999–00	Dallas Stars	NHL	65	18	21	39	68	15	1	7	8	18
2000–01	Dallas Stars	NHL	53	12	18	30	57	10	2	2	4	6
2001–02	Dallas Stars	NHL	68	10	16	26	54	—	—	—	—	—
2001–02	New Jersey Devils	NHL	14	3	3	6	23	5	0	1	1	8
2002–03	New Jersey Devils	NHL	78	22	33	55	65	24	11	7	18	16
2003–04	New Jersey Devils	NHL	53	10	16	26	43	5	0	2	2	2
2004–05	ERC Ingolstadt	DEL	11	2	2	4	22	11	1	6	7	6
2005–06	New Jersey Devils	NHL	80	19	34	53	74	9	3	10	13	16
2006–07	New Jersey Devils	NHL	82	23	37	60	64	11	2	6	8	7
2007–08	New Jersey Devils	NHL	64	13	28	41	30	5	0	4	4	4
2008–09	New Jersey Devils	NHL	81	29	40	69	56	4	2	1	3	2
2009–10	New Jersey Devils	NHL	81	19	42	61	44	5	0	1	1	4
2010–11	New Jersey Devils	NHL	31	4	10	14	16	—	—	—	—	—
2010–11	Dallas Stars	NHL	39	5	13	18	29	—	—	—	—	—
2011–12	St. Louis Blues	NHL	70	6	18	24	32	9	1	0	1	11
2012–13	St. Louis Blues	NHL	4	0	1	1	0	—	—	—	—	—
NHL totals			1,109	243	420	663	837	146	34	53	87	138

=== International ===
Jamie Langenbrunner
Medal record

Men's ice hockey

Representing the United States

Olympic Games
Silver medal – second place	2010 Vancouver	

Year	Team	Event	GP	G	A	Pts	PIM
1994	United States	WJC	7	2	0	2	13
1995	United States	WJC	7	1	1	2	6
1998	United States	OG	3	0	0	0	4
2004	United States	WCH	3	0	0	0	4
2010	United States	OG	6	1	3	4	0
Junior totals			14	3	1	4	19
Senior totals			12	1	3	4	8

== Awards and honors ==
Award	Year	Ref
Michigan K-Wings
Most valuable player	1995–96	
NHL
Stanley Cup champion	1999, 2003	
IIHF
Winter Olympics silver medal	2010	

== See also ==
- List of NHL players with 1,000 games played

Preceded by Patrik Eliáš	New Jersey Devils captain 2007–2011	Succeeded by Zach Parise
