= Oleg Tverdovsky =

Russian ice hockey player (born 1976)

- Born: 18 May 1976 (age 50) Donetsk, Ukrainian SSR, Soviet Union
- Height: 6 ft 1 in (185 cm)
- Weight: 211 lb (96 kg; 15 st 1 lb)
- Position: Defence
- Shot: Left
- Played for: Krylya Sovetov Moscow; Mighty Ducks of Anaheim; Winnipeg Jets; Phoenix Coyotes; New Jersey Devils; Avangard Omsk; Carolina Hurricanes; Los Angeles Kings; Salavat Yulaev Ufa; Metallurg Magnitogorsk
- National team: Russia
- NHL draft: 2nd overall, 1994; Mighty Ducks of Anaheim
- Playing career: 1992–2013

Oleg Fedorovych Tverdovsky (Russian: Олег Фёдорович Твердовский; born 18 May 1976) is a Russian former professional ice hockey defenceman who played professionally from 1994 to 2013. He was selected second overall by the Mighty Ducks of Anaheim in the 1994 NHL entry draft, playing 713 games in the National Hockey League (NHL) with the Mighty Ducks of Anaheim, Winnipeg Jets, Phoenix Coyotes, New Jersey Devils, Carolina Hurricanes, and Los Angeles Kings. He won two Stanley Cups with the Devils in 2003, and the Hurricanes in 2006.

He also played in the Russian Superleague (RSL)/Kontinental Hockey League (KHL) with Avangard Omsk, Salavat Yulayev Ufa, and Metallurg Magnitogorsk winning 2 RSL Championships in 2004 (Avangard Omsk), and 2008 (Salavat Yulaev Ufa), he later won a Gagarin Cup in 2011 with Salavat Yulaev Ufa.

== Playing career ==
=== NHL and Superleague ===
Tverdovsky was drafted second overall by the Mighty Ducks of Anaheim in the 1994 NHL entry draft. Due to the 1994–95 lockout delaying the season, Tverdovsky was assigned to the Brandon Wheat Kings of the Western Hockey League, where he played seven games. When he debuted for the Mighty Ducks, he set a franchise record for being the youngest player to suit up for a game, at 18 years, eight months and 13 days. Despite being considered one of the cornerstones for the young Mighty Ducks franchise, Tverdovsky was traded to the Winnipeg Jets on 7 February 1996 with Chad Kilger and a 1996 third-round pick in exchange for Teemu Selänne, Marc Chouinard and a 1996 fourth-round pick. In 1996, Tverdovsky represented Russia at the World Cup of Hockey.

Tverdovsky's stay in Winnipeg would be short-lived, as the Jets franchise relocated to Phoenix, Arizona and was rebranded as the Phoenix Coyotes. In 1997, Tverdovsky was selected to the All-Star Game representing the Coyotes. While establishing himself as a fixture on the Coyotes blueline for his tenure with the club, Tverdovsky was traded back to the Mighty Ducks at the 1999 NHL entry draft in exchange for Travis Green and a 1999 first-round pick (Scott Kelman). In 2002, he represented Russia at the 2002 Winter Olympics.

He was then sent to the Devils in the summer of 2002 along with teammate Jeff Friesen in a seven player trade that sent Petr Sykora to Anaheim. The two teams would battle one another in the 2003 Stanley Cup Final nearly a year later. Following the 2003 season, Tverdovsky returned to Russia to play in the Russian Superleague with Avangard Omsk. While with Avangard, he won the league championship. Tverdovsky represented Russia at the World Cup of Hockey. He returned to the NHL as a free agent, signing with the Carolina Hurricanes in 2005.

Tverdovsky has won the Stanley Cup twice in his career — once while a member of the New Jersey Devils in 2003 and once as a member of the Hurricanes in 2006. On 29 September 2006, Tverdovsky and Jack Johnson were traded to the Los Angeles Kings in exchange for Éric Bélanger and Tim Gleason.

=== Return to Russia ===
Tverdovsky played the 2007–08 season in Russia for Salavat Yulayev Ufa, where he played for the next five seasons. When he left the NHL, Tverdovsky was still under contract with the Los Angeles Kings. This was able to happen because there was no transfer agreement between the NHL and the Russian Hockey Federation.

He was also selected as a reserve by Team Russia for the 2010 Winter Olympics should an injury occur during the tournament.

He was traded to Metallurg Magnitogorsk in the 2011–12 season, and played part of the next season with that club before retiring.

== Personal life ==
Tverdovsky lives with his second wife Mia in the United States. Together they are raising five kids.

== Career statistics ==
=== Regular season and playoffs ===
			Regular season					Playoffs
Season	Team	League	GP	G	A	Pts	PIM	GP	G	A	Pts	PIM
1992–93	Krylya Sovetov Moscow	IHL	21	0	1	1	6	6	0	0	0	0
1992–93	Krylya Sovetov–2 Moscow	RUS.2	29	11	14	25	28	—	—	—	—	—
1993–94	Krylya Sovetov Moscow	IHL	46	4	10	14	22	3	1	0	1	2
1994–95	Brandon Wheat Kings	WHL	7	1	4	5	4	—	—	—	—	—
1994–95	Mighty Ducks of Anaheim	NHL	36	3	9	12	14	—	—	—	—	—
1995–96	Mighty Ducks of Anaheim	NHL	51	7	15	22	35	—	—	—	—	—
1995–96	Winnipeg Jets	NHL	31	0	8	8	6	6	0	1	1	0
1996–97	Phoenix Coyotes	NHL	82	10	45	55	30	7	0	1	1	0
1997–98	Hamilton Bulldogs	AHL	9	8	6	14	2	—	—	—	—	—
1997–98	Phoenix Coyotes	NHL	46	7	12	19	12	6	0	7	7	0
1998–99	Phoenix Coyotes	NHL	82	7	18	25	32	6	0	2	2	6
1999–2000	Mighty Ducks of Anaheim	NHL	82	15	36	51	30	—	—	—	—	—
2000–01	Mighty Ducks of Anaheim	NHL	82	14	39	53	32	—	—	—	—	—
2001–02	Mighty Ducks of Anaheim	NHL	73	6	26	32	31	—	—	—	—	—
2002–03	New Jersey Devils	NHL	50	5	8	13	22	15	0	3	3	0
2003–04	Avangard Omsk	RSL	57	16	17	33	58	11	0	2	2	2
2004–05	Avangard Omsk	RSL	48	5	15	20	65	11	0	3	3	35
2005–06	Carolina Hurricanes	NHL	72	3	20	23	37	5	0	0	0	0
2006–07	Los Angeles Kings	NHL	26	0	4	4	10	—	—	—	—	—
2006–07	Manchester Monarchs	AHL	14	5	8	13	2	14	2	9	11	14
2007–08	Salavat Yulaev Ufa	RSL	43	6	11	17	58	16	2	6	8	10
2008–09	Salavat Yulaev Ufa	KHL	48	8	19	27	30	2	0	0	0	0
2009–10	Salavat Yulaev Ufa	KHL	42	8	13	21	38	16	1	4	5	4
2010–11	Salavat Yulaev Ufa	KHL	40	7	9	16	20	7	1	0	1	12
2011–12	Salavat Yulaev Ufa	KHL	12	0	0	0	8	—	—	—	—	—
2011–12	Metallurg Magnitogorsk	KHL	24	6	5	11	18	4	0	1	1	2
2011–12	Toros Neftekamsk	VHL	2	0	0	0	0	—	—	—	—	—
2012–13	Metallurg Magnitogorsk	KHL	25	0	5	5	18	3	0	0	0	0
RSL totals			148	27	43	70	181	38	2	11	13	47
NHL totals			713	77	240	317	291	45	0	14	14	6
KHL totals			191	29	51	80	132	32	2	5	7	18

=== International ===
Medal record

Representing Russia

Ice hockey

Olympic Games
Bronze medal – third place	2002 Salt Lake City	

World Championships
Gold medal – first place	2009 Switzerland	

World Junior Championships
Bronze medal – third place	1994 Ostrava	

Year	Team	Event	Result	GP	G	A	Pts	PIM
1993	Russia	EJC	2nd place, silver medalist(s)	6	1	2	3	0
1994	Russia	WJC	3rd place, bronze medalist(s)	7	1	5	6	6
1994	Russia	EJC	2nd place, silver medalist(s)	5	1	9	10	22
1996	Russia	WC	4th	3	0	1	1	0
1996	Russia	WCH	SF	4	1	0	1	0
2001	Russia	WC	6th	7	2	2	4	2
2002	Russia	OG	3rd place, bronze medalist(s)	6	1	1	2	0
2004	Russia	WC	10th	6	0	1	1	6
2004	Russia	WCH	QF	3	0	0	0	0
2009	Russia	WC	1st place, gold medalist(s)	9	2	2	4	6
Junior totals				18	3	16	19	28
Senior totals				38	6	7	13	14

Note:

- 2010 - Winter Olympics (reserve)

== Awards and achievements ==
Award	Year
NHL
All-Star Game	1997
Stanley Cup (New Jersey Devils)	2003
Stanley Cup (Carolina Hurricanes)	2006
RSL
Champion (Avangard Omsk)	2004
MVP	2004
Champion (Salavat Yulaev Ufa)	2008
KHL
Gagarin Cup (Salavat Yulaev Ufa)	2011

Awards and achievements
Preceded by Paul Kariya	Anaheim Ducks first-round draft pick 1994	Succeeded by Chad Kilger
