= Mike Leclerc =

Canadian ice hockey player (born 1976)

- Born: November 10, 1976 (age 49) Winnipeg, Manitoba, Canada
- Height: 6 ft 1 in (185 cm)
- Weight: 205 lb (93 kg; 14 st 9 lb)
- Position: Left wing
- Shot: Left
- Played for: Mighty Ducks of Anaheim; Phoenix Coyotes; Calgary Flames
- NHL draft: 55th overall, 1995; Mighty Ducks of Anaheim
- Playing career: 1996–2006

Michael Leclerc (born November 10, 1976) is a Canadian former professional ice hockey forward who played 341 games in the National Hockey League (NHL) predominantly with the Mighty Ducks of Anaheim.

== Playing career ==
Leclerc was a 6'1", 205 lb. left winger from Winnipeg, Manitoba. Born on November 10, 1976, he earned his chops at the junior level in the WHL, playing with the Victoria/Prince George Cougars and the Brandon Wheat Kings. He totaled 58 goals and 66 assists in 206 games through his first four seasons in the league. The Mighty Ducks of Anaheim selected him in the third round of the 1995 NHL Entry Draft with the 55th overall pick. He would play one more season with the Wheat Kings, increasing his numbers to 58 goals and 53 assists with 161 penalty minutes in 71 games.

Leclerc's first three professional seasons were spent mostly in the AHL, between the Baltimore Bandits (71 games, 29 goals, 27 assists, 134 PiM) and the Cincinnati Mighty Ducks (113 games, 43 goals, 50 assists, 236 PiM). He also scored a goal and an assist in 19 games with Anaheim during that time. He joined the Ducks' NHL roster for good starting in the 1999–00 season and would play in 272 more games for the team over the next five seasons, scoring 53 markers and adding 77 assists. This includes a 20-goal campaign in 2001–02.

After a trade to the Phoenix Coyotes before the 2005–06 season, Leclerc scored nine times with 12 assists in 35 games in the desert. On Groundhog's Day, 2006, Phoenix traded him with Brian Boucher to the Calgary Flames for Steven Reinprecht and Philippe Sauve. In 15 games, he scored once on 21 shots with four assists and an even rating. On March 2, he had two assists in a 3–1 win against the St. Louis Blues. He tallied his lone goal on March 16, in a 3–2 loss to the Edmonton Oilers.

== Career statistics ==
| | | | Regular season | | | | | Playoffs |
| Season | Team | League | GP | G | A | Pts | PIM | GP | G | A | Pts | PIM |
|---|---|---|---|---|---|---|---|---|---|---|---|---|
| 1991–92 | Victoria Cougars | WHL | 2 | 0 | 0 | 0 | 0 | — | — | — | — | — |
| 1992–93 | Victoria Cougars | WHL | 70 | 4 | 11 | 15 | 118 | — | — | — | — | — |
| 1993–94 | Victoria Cougars | WHL | 68 | 29 | 11 | 40 | 112 | — | — | — | — | — |
| 1994–95 | Prince George Cougars | WHL | 43 | 20 | 36 | 56 | 78 | — | — | — | — | — |
| 1994–95 | Brandon Wheat Kings | WHL | 23 | 5 | 8 | 13 | 50 | 18 | 10 | 6 | 16 | 33 |
| 1995–96 | Brandon Wheat Kings | WHL | 71 | 58 | 53 | 111 | 161 | 19 | 6 | 19 | 25 | 25 |
| 1996–97 | Baltimore Bandits | AHL | 71 | 29 | 27 | 56 | 134 | — | — | — | — | — |
| 1996–97 | Mighty Ducks of Anaheim | NHL | 5 | 1 | 1 | 2 | 0 | 1 | 0 | 0 | 0 | 0 |
| 1997–98 | Cincinnati Mighty Ducks | AHL | 48 | 18 | 22 | 40 | 83 | — | — | — | — | — |
| 1997–98 | Mighty Ducks of Anaheim | NHL | 7 | 0 | 0 | 0 | 6 | — | — | — | — | — |
| 1998–99 | Mighty Ducks of Anaheim | NHL | 7 | 0 | 0 | 0 | 4 | 1 | 0 | 0 | 0 | 0 |
| 1998–99 | Cincinnati Mighty Ducks | AHL | 65 | 25 | 28 | 53 | 153 | 3 | 0 | 1 | 1 | 19 |
| 1999–00 | Mighty Ducks of Anaheim | NHL | 69 | 8 | 11 | 19 | 70 | — | — | — | — | — |
| 2000–01 | Mighty Ducks of Anaheim | NHL | 54 | 15 | 20 | 35 | 26 | — | — | — | — | — |
| 2001–02 | Mighty Ducks of Anaheim | NHL | 82 | 20 | 24 | 44 | 107 | — | — | — | — | — |
| 2002–03 | Mighty Ducks of Anaheim | NHL | 57 | 9 | 19 | 28 | 34 | 21 | 2 | 9 | 11 | 12 |
| 2003–04 | Mighty Ducks of Anaheim | NHL | 10 | 1 | 3 | 4 | 4 | — | — | — | — | — |
| 2005–06 | Phoenix Coyotes | NHL | 35 | 9 | 12 | 21 | 29 | — | — | — | — | — |
| 2005–06 | Calgary Flames | NHL | 15 | 1 | 4 | 5 | 8 | 3 | 0 | 0 | 0 | 2 |
| NHL totals | | | 341 | 64 | 94 | 158 | 288 | 26 | 2 | 9 | 11 | 14 |

== Awards ==
- WHL East Second All-Star Team – 1996
