= Pascal Rhéaume =

Canadian ice hockey player (born 1973)

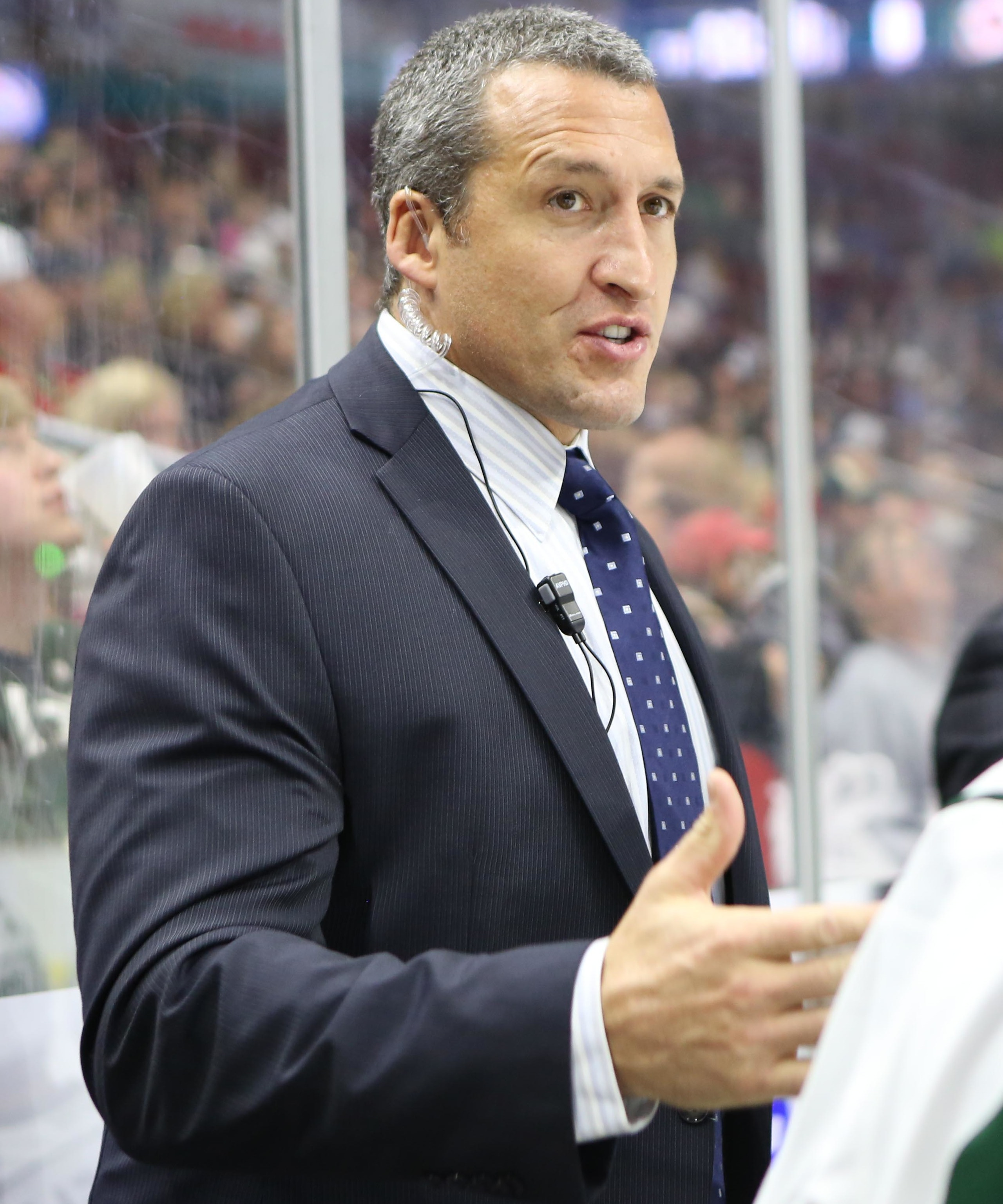
- Rhéaume during the 2015–16 season
- Born: June 21, 1973 (age 53) Quebec City, Quebec, Canada
- Height: 6 ft 1 in (185 cm)
- Weight: 210 lb (95 kg; 15 st 0 lb)
- Position: Centre
- Shot: Left
- Played for: New Jersey Devils; St. Louis Blues; Chicago Blackhawks; Atlanta Thrashers; New York Rangers; Phoenix Coyotes; Vienna Capitals
- NHL draft: Undrafted
- Playing career: 1993–2010

Pascal Rhéaume (born June 21, 1973) is a Canadian professional ice hockey coach and former player who played nine seasons in the National Hockey League (NHL). He currently serves as the head coach of the Toronto Sceptres of the Professional Women's Hockey League (PWHL).

== Playing career ==
As a youth, he played in the 1985, 1986 and 1987 Quebec International Pee-Wee Hockey Tournaments with a minor ice hockey team from Charlesbourg, Quebec City.

Originally undrafted into the National Hockey League (NHL), Rhéaume played for the New Jersey Devils, St. Louis Blues, Chicago Blackhawks, Atlanta Thrashers, New York Rangers and Phoenix Coyotes over the course of nine seasons between 1997–2006. His greatest individual performance came while member of the Thrashers on January 19, 2002, whereas, during a game versus the Florida Panthers, Rhéaume scored four goals and registered an assist for a career high of five points.

On August 5, 2008, Rhéaume signed a minor-league contract with the Devils to return for a fourth stint with the organization, having previously won a Calder Cup with American Hockey League (AHL) affiliate Albany River Rats in 1995 and a Stanley Cup in 2003 with New Jersey.

== Coaching career ==
Rhéaume began his coaching career as an assistant coach with the Drummonville Voltigeurs in the Quebec Major Junior Hockey League (QMJHL) for the 2010–11 season. He was assistant coach of the QMJHL's Sherbrooke Phoenix for the 2012–13 season, and became head coach of the Sherbrooke Cougars of the Quebec Junior AAA Hockey League (QMAAA) for 2013–14 and 2014–15 seasons.

On July 8, 2015, Rhéaume was announced as an assistant coach to the Iowa Wild of the American Hockey League (AHL), the top affiliate of the Minnesota Wild. He then returned to the QMJHL as an assistant coach with the Phoenix on September 26, 2016.

Rhéaume was announced as the head coach of the Val d'or Foreurs on May 24, 2018. He was fired from the position on February 24, 2020; he learned of his own firing via social media.

On July 14, 2021, he was announced as an assistant coach of the Trois-Rivières Lions in the ECHL. Rhéaume was named general manager and head coach of the Lions on June 22, 2023 following the firing of predecessor Marc-André Bergeron. However, just a few short weeks later, Rhéaume announced that he would be leaving the Lions organization to assume the position of assistant coach with the Bridgeport Islanders, the AHL affiliate of the New York Islanders.

== Personal life ==
He is the younger brother of Manon Rhéaume, the first woman to appear in an NHL preseason game with the Tampa Bay Lightning in 1992. His daughters, Logane and Alexane, played collegiately for the Montreal Carabins and Mercyhurst Lakers respectively. Similarly, his son, Nick, is a junior with the Northeastern Huskies of the National Collegiate Athletic Association (NCAA).

== Career statistics ==
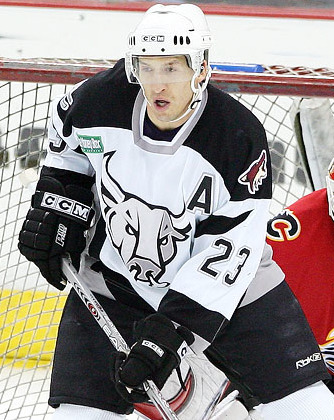
Rhéaume with the San Antonio Rampage in 2006

			Regular season					Playoffs
Season	Team	League	GP	G	A	Pts	PIM	GP	G	A	Pts	PIM
1991–92	Trois-Rivières Draveurs	QMJHL	65	17	20	37	84	14	5	4	9	23
1992–93	Sherbrooke Faucons	QMJHL	65	28	34	62	88	14	6	5	11	31
1993–94	Albany River Rats	AHL	55	17	18	35	43	5	0	1	1	0
1994–95	Albany River Rats	AHL	78	19	25	44	46	14	3	6	9	19
1995–96	Albany River Rats	AHL	68	26	42	68	50	4	1	2	3	2
1996–97	Albany River Rats	AHL	51	22	23	45	40	16	2	8	10	16
1996–97	New Jersey Devils	NHL	2	1	0	1	0	—	—	—	—	—
1997–98	St. Louis Blues	NHL	48	6	9	15	35	10	1	3	4	8
1998–99	St. Louis Blues	NHL	60	9	18	27	24	5	1	0	1	4
1999–00	St. Louis Blues	NHL	7	1	1	2	6	—	—	—	—	—
1999–00	Worcester IceCats	AHL	7	1	1	2	4	—	—	—	—	—
2000–01	St. Louis Blues	NHL	8	2	0	2	5	3	0	1	1	0
2000–01	Worcester IceCats	AHL	53	23	36	59	63	11	2	4	6	2
2001–02	Chicago Blackhawks	NHL	19	0	2	2	4	—	—	—	—	—
2001–02	Atlanta Thrashers	NHL	42	11	9	20	25	—	—	—	—	—
2002–03	Atlanta Thrashers	NHL	56	4	9	13	24	—	—	—	—	—
2002–03	New Jersey Devils	NHL	21	4	1	5	8	24	1	2	3	13
2003–04	Hartford Wolf Pack	AHL	3	1	0	1	0	—	—	—	—	—
2003–04	New York Rangers	NHL	17	0	0	0	5	—	—	—	—	—
2003–04	St. Louis Blues	NHL	25	1	3	4	4	3	0	0	0	2
2004–05	Albany River Rats	AHL	78	24	25	49	85	—	—	—	—	—
2005–06	New Jersey Devils	NHL	12	0	0	0	4	—	—	—	—	—
2005–06	Albany River Rats	AHL	9	2	0	2	9	—	—	—	—	—
2005–06	San Antonio Rampage	AHL	47	13	13	26	35	—	—	—	—	—
2005–06	Phoenix Coyotes	NHL	1	0	0	0	0	—	—	—	—	—
2006–07	San Antonio Rampage	AHL	79	15	32	47	63	—	—	—	—	—
2007–08	Vienna Capitals	EBEL	35	11	18	29	30	7	1	1	2	33
2008–09	Lowell Devils	AHL	56	11	19	30	44	—	—	—	—	—
2009–10	Flint Generals	IHL	73	21	36	57	35	12	6	12	18	14
2009–10	Manchester Monarchs	AHL	1	0	0	0	0	—	—	—	—	—
2009–10	Peoria Rivermen	AHL	1	0	1	1	0	—	—	—	—	—
NHL totals			318	39	52	91	144	45	3	6	9	27

== Awards and honours ==
Award	Year	Ref
AHL
Calder Cup champion	1995	
NHL
Stanley Cup champion	2003	
