= Jiří Bicek =

Slovak ice hockey player (born 1978)

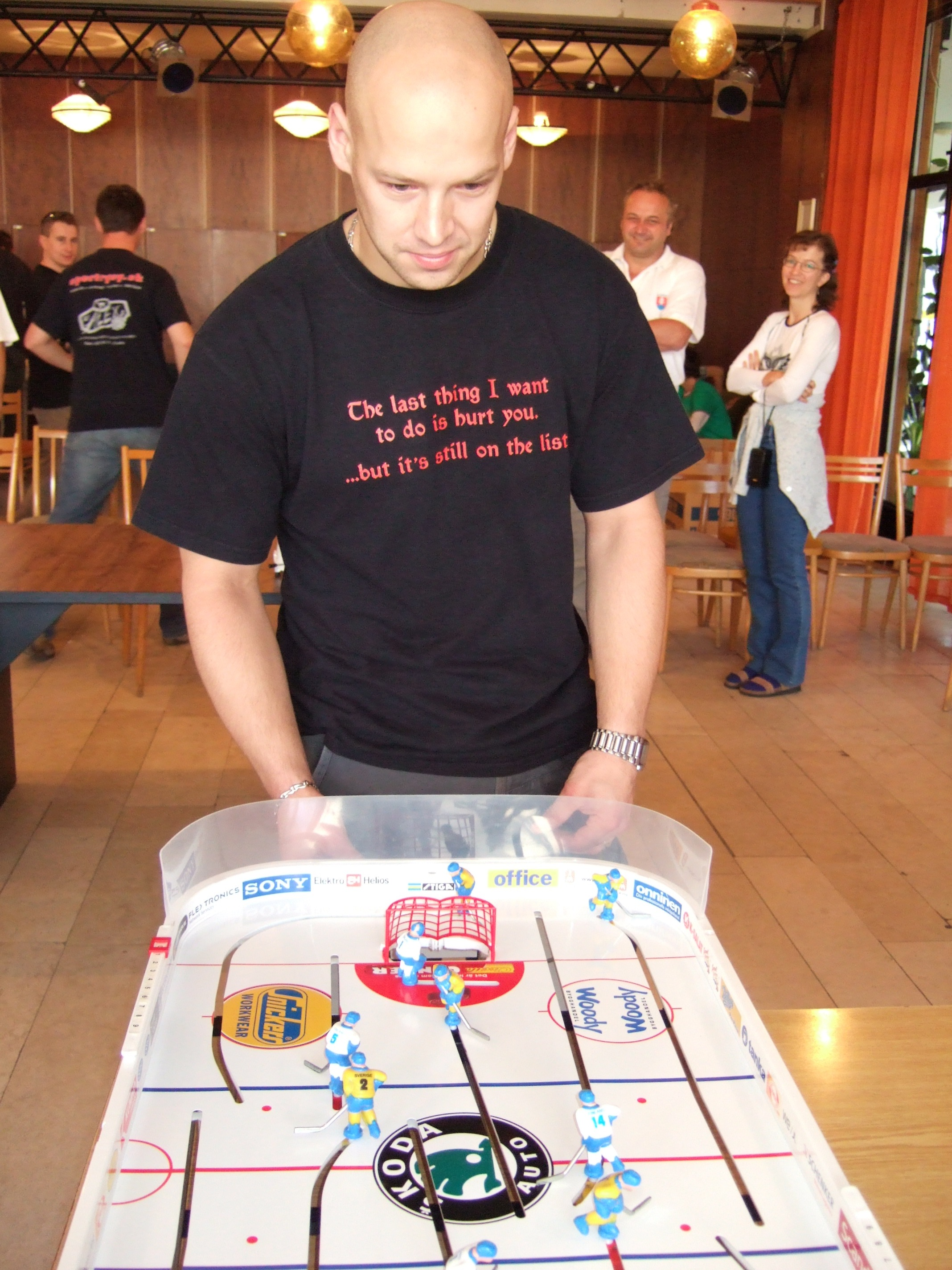
- Bicek in 2006
- Born: 3 December 1978 (age 47) Košice, Czechoslovakia
- Height: 5 ft 10 in (178 cm)
- Weight: 190 lb (86 kg; 13 st 8 lb)
- Position: Right wing
- Shot: Left
- Played for: New Jersey Devils
- NHL draft: 131st overall, 1997; New Jersey Devils
- Playing career: 1995–2018

Jiří Bicek (born 3 December 1978) is a Slovak former professional ice hockey winger. He played in the National Hockey League with the New Jersey Devils between 2000 and 2004, winning the Stanley Cup with them in 2003. By doing so, Bicek became the first Slovak player to win the Stanley Cup. After returning to Europe in 2004, he spent the rest of his career playing in the national leagues of Slovakia, Sweden, Finland, Switzerland and the Czech Republic

Internationally, Bicek played for the Slovak national team at several tournaments, including the 1997 and 2009 World Championships.

== Playing career ==
=== United States ===
Bicek was drafted 131st overall by the New Jersey Devils in the 1997 NHL entry draft. He then proceeded to play 7 pro seasons in North America.

In 62 career NHL regular season games for the New Jersey Devils, Bicek scored 6 goals and 7 assists for 13 points, also playing in 7 playoff games. He won a Stanley Cup in 2003 with the Devils, becoming the first Slovak ice hockey player to win it.

=== Return to Europe ===
Bicek returned to Slovakia to play for HC Košice in September 2004 due to the 2004–05 NHL lockout. In the 2005–06 season he played in Sweden for Leksands IF, who were relegated despite Bicek contributing 16 goals and 12 assists. He stayed in the Elitserien but moved to Brynäs IF in July 2006. He joined Finnish club KalPa for a 10-match trial period in November 2007, going on to make 35 appearances for KalPa with 13 goals and 14 assists. Bicek then moved to JYP in the SM-Liiga in August 2008.

He joined Swiss side EHC Biel at the end of December 2008 on a short-term contract. In 2009–10 Bicek was playing in Sweden for Södertälje SK. At the start of the 2010–11 season he played twice for HC Prešov in Slovakia's second-tier Slovenská hokejová liga, on a non-contract basis. He then signed for HC Kladno of the Czech Extraliga in November 2010.

He moved within the Extraliga to Energie Karlovy Vary in December 2012, providing two assists in his first game for the club in a 4–1 win at Sparta.

Bicek played the later years of his career with Košice, announcing his retirement in February 2018, having played just fourteen times for the club in the 2017–18 season.

== International play ==
Bicek took part twice in the Ice Hockey World Championships: his first experience was in the 1997 tournament in Finland. He was also part of the Slovakia team at the 2009 IIHF World Championship held in Switzerland.

== Career statistics ==
=== Regular season and playoffs ===
			Regular season					Playoffs
Season	Team	League	GP	G	A	Pts	PIM	GP	G	A	Pts	PIM
1994–95	HC Košice U20	SVK U20	42	38	36	74	18	—	—	—	—	—
1995–96	HC Košice U20	SVK U20	9	12	8	20	14	—	—	—	—	—
1995–96	HC Košice	SVK	30	10	15	25	16	9	2	4	6	0
1996–97	HC Košice	SVK	44	11	14	25	20	7	1	3	4	—
1997–98	Albany River Rats	AHL	50	10	10	20	22	13	1	6	7	4
1998–99	Albany River Rats	AHL	79	15	45	60	102	5	2	2	4	2
1999–00	Albany River Rats	AHL	80	7	36	43	51	4	0	2	2	0
2000–01	New Jersey Devils	NHL	5	1	0	1	4	—	—	—	—	—
2000–01	Albany River Rats	AHL	73	12	29	41	73	—	—	—	—	—
2001–02	New Jersey Devils	NHL	1	0	0	0	0	—	—	—	—	—
2001–02	Albany River Rats	AHL	62	15	19	34	45	—	—	—	—	—
2002–03	New Jersey Devils	NHL	44	5	6	11	25	5	0	0	0	0
2002–03	Albany River Rats	AHL	24	4	10	14	28	—	—	—	—	—
2003–04	New Jersey Devils	NHL	12	0	1	1	0	2	0	0	0	0
2003–04	Albany River Rats	AHL	55	12	18	30	37	—	—	—	—	—
2004–05	HC Košice	SVK	54	18	23	41	69	10	6	8	14	4
2005–06	Leksands IF	SWE	50	16	12	28	48	—	—	—	—	—
2006–07	HC Košice	SVK	14	3	5	8	8	—	—	—	—	—
2006–07	Brynäs IF	SWE	35	8	9	17	34	6	2	1	3	39
2007–08	KalPa	FIN	35	13	14	27	32	—	—	—	—	—
2008–09	JYP	FIN	33	7	8	15	16	—	—	—	—	—
2008–09	EHC Biel	NLA	15	1	4	5	4	—	—	—	—	—
2009–10	Södertälje SK	SWE	44	5	2	7	22	—	—	—	—	—
2010–11	HC Prešov	SVK-2	2	0	1	1	0	—	—	—	—	—
2010–11	HC Kladno	CZE	35	10	10	20	24	—	—	—	—	—
2011–12	Rytíři Kladno	CZE	50	13	12	25	22	3	1	2	3	0
2012–13	Rytíři Kladno	CZE	17	2	2	4	4	—	—	—	—	—
2012–13	HC Karlovy Vary	CZE	25	4	10	14	2	—	—	—	—	—
2013–14	HC Košice	SVK	52	14	14	28	20	17	1	5	6	4
2014–15	HC Košice	SVK	46	13	10	23	14	17	6	3	9	4
2015–16	HC Košice	SVK	47	13	27	40	10	10	0	4	4	0
2016–17	HC Košice	SVK	54	15	18	33	12	6	1	1	2	4
2017–18	HC Košice	SVK	4	0	0	0	0	—	—	—	—	—
SVK totals			345	97	126	223	169	76	17	28	45	16
NHL totals			62	6	7	13	29	7	0	0	0	0

=== International ===
Year	Team	Event	GP	G	A	Pts	PIM
1995	Slovakia	EJC-B	5	6	1	7	0
1996	Slovakia	EJC	5	1	3	4	18
1996	Slovakia	WJC	6	2	5	7	4
1997	Slovakia	WJC	6	2	1	3	4
1997	Slovakia	WC	8	1	0	1	4
2009	Slovakia	WC	6	0	0	0	2
Junior totals			22	11	10	21	26
Senior totals			14	1	0	1	6

== Awards ==
- 2003 — NHL Stanley Cup

== Personal life ==
Bicek is the son-in-law of Slovak hockey player Vincent Lukáč.
