= Corey Schwab =

Canadian professional ice hockey player

- Born: November 4, 1970 (age 55) North Battleford, Saskatchewan, Canada
- Height: 6 ft 0 in (183 cm)
- Weight: 180 lb (82 kg; 12 st 12 lb)
- Position: Goalie
- Caught: Left
- Played for: New Jersey Devils; Tampa Bay Lightning; Vancouver Canucks; Toronto Maple Leafs
- NHL draft: 200th overall, 1990; New Jersey Devils
- Playing career: 1991–2004

Corey Schwab (born November 4, 1970) is a Canadian former professional ice hockey goaltender. He was drafted in the tenth round, 200th overall in the 1990 NHL entry draft by the New Jersey Devils. Schwab won the 2003 Stanley Cup with the New Jersey Devils and the 1995 Calder Cup with the Albany River Rats.

== Playing career ==
Following a three-year WHL career in Seattle, Schwab saw time with the ECHL's Cincinnati Cyclones and the AHL's Utica Devils before settling in with the AHL's Albany River Rats for two seasons. During the 1994–95 season, Schwab was joined by fellow 1990 draftee Mike Dunham between the pipes. While Schwab led the league in goals against average with 2.59, the two combined for the AHL's fewest goals against and were awarded the Harry "Hap" Holmes Memorial Trophy as well as the Jack A. Butterfield Trophy as the playoff MVP's helping the River Rats capture their first Calder Cup title.

The next season, Schwab saw his first action in the NHL when he was called up to New Jersey where he appeared in ten games. At the end of the season, he was traded to the Tampa Bay Lightning, where he stayed for three seasons. He then went out west to the Vancouver Canucks for another brief stay and spent time that year with the AHL's Syracuse Crunch and IHL's Orlando Solar Bears before moving on to play with the IHL's Kansas City Blades in 2000–01.

Schwab began the 2001–02 season at the Toronto Maple Leafs' training camp without a contract. After an impressive pre-season, he was signed to the team as the backup goaltender for Curtis Joseph. Schwab started 30 games for the Leafs and had a career high 12 wins before signing as a free agent in the off-season with the team that originally drafted him back in 1990, the New Jersey Devils.

The return to New Jersey was very timely for Schwab, as the Devils claimed the Stanley Cup in 2003 – the franchise's third title in nine years and Schwab's first as a player.

Schwab's final game was played on January 17, 2004 where he posted a 2–1 overtime victory over the Washington Capitals. Schwab finished his career having played in 147 regular season NHL games amassing 43 wins, 63 losses and 13 ties with a goals against average of 2.89, a save percentage of .896, and six shutouts. Schwab appeared in 40 minutes of postseason action over three games with the Maple Leafs and Devils stopping all 13 shots he faced.

He served as goaltending development coach and scout for three seasons (2005–08) with the Tampa Bay Lightning. He was the goaltending development coach for the San Jose Sharks (2008–2015). He is currently the goaltending coach for the Utah Mammoth.

== Career statistics ==
=== Regular season and playoffs ===
			Regular season									Playoffs
Season	Team	League	GP	W	L	T	MIN	GA	SO	GAA	SV%	GP	W	L	MIN	GA	SO	GAA	SV%
1988–89	Seattle Thunderbirds	WHL	10	2	2	0	386	31	0	4.82	.849	—	—	—	—	—	—	—	—
1989–90	Seattle Thunderbirds	WHL	27	15	2	1	1150	69	1	3.60	.891	3	0	0	49	2	0	2.45	—
1990–91	Seattle Thunderbirds	WHL	58	32	18	3	3289	224	0	4.09	.887	6	1	5	382	25	0	3.93	.890
1991–92	Cincinnati Cyclones	ECHL	8	6	0	1	450	31	0	4.13	.873	9	6	3	540	29	0	3.22	—
1991–92	Utica Devils	AHL	24	9	12	1	1322	95	0	3.31	.876	—	—	—	—	—	—	—	—
1992–93	Cincinnati Cyclones	ECHL	3	1	2	0	185	60	17	5.51	.821	—	—	—	—	—	—	—	—
1992–93	Utica Devils	AHL	40	18	16	5	2387	169	2	4.25	.883	1	0	1	59	6	0	6.10	—
1993–94	Albany River Rats	AHL	51	27	21	3	3058	184	0	3.61	.887	5	1	4	298	20	0	4.02	.879
1994–95	Albany River Rats	AHL	45	25	10	9	2177	117	3	2.59	.906	7	6	1	425	19	0	2.68	.904
1995–96	Albany River Rats	AHL	5	3	2	0	299	13	0	2.61	.898	—	—	—	—	—	—	—	—
1995–96	New Jersey Devils	NHL	10	0	3	0	331	12	0	2.18	.899	—	—	—	—	—	—	—	—
1996–97	Tampa Bay Lightning	NHL	31	11	12	1	1463	74	2	3.04	.897	—	—	—	—	—	—	—	—
1997–98	Tampa Bay Lightning	NHL	16	2	9	1	821	40	1	2.92	.892	—	—	—	—	—	—	—	—
1998–99	Cleveland Lumberjacks	IHL	8	1	6	1	477	31	0	3.90	.885	—	—	—	—	—	—	—	—
1998–99	Tampa Bay Lightning	NHL	40	8	25	3	2146	126	0	3.52	.891	—	—	—	—	—	—	—	—
1999–00	Orlando Solar Bears	IHL	16	9	4	2	2146	31	1	2.14	.913	—	—	—	—	—	—	—	—
1999–00	Syracuse Crunch	AHL	12	7	5	0	720	42	0	3.50	.889	4	1	3	246	11	1	2.69	.922
1999–00	Vancouver Canucks	NHL	6	2	1	1	269	16	0	3.57	.861	—	—	—	—	—	—	—	—
2000–01	Kansas City Blades	IHL	50	22	24	1	2866	150	2	3.14	.902	—	—	—	—	—	—	—	—
2001–02	Toronto Maple Leafs	NHL	30	12	10	5	1646	75	1	2.73	.894	1	0	0	13	0	0	0.00	1.00
2002–03	New Jersey Devils	NHL	11	5	3	1	614	15	1	1.47	.933	2	0	0	28	0	0	0.00	1.00
2003–04	New Jersey Devils	NHL	3	2	0	1	188	2	1	0.64	.971	—	—	—	—	—	—	—	—
NHL totals			147	42	63	13	7475	360	6	2.89	.896	3	0	0	41	0	0	0.00	1.00

== Awards ==
AHL Second All-Star Team (1995)

1995 Calder Cup champion – Albany River Rats

Harry "Hap" Holmes Memorial Award (Fewest goals against – AHL) (1995) (co-winner – Mike Dunham)

Jack A. Butterfield Trophy (Playoff MVP – AHL) (1995) (co-winner – Mike Dunham)

2003 Stanley Cup champion – New Jersey Devils

== Transactions ==
Traded to Tampa Bay by New Jersey for Jeff Reese, Chicago's second round choice (previously acquired, New Jersey selected Pierre Dagenais) in 1996 Entry Draft and Tampa Bay's 8th round choice (Jay Bertsch) in 1996 Entry Draft, June 22, 1996.

Claimed by Atlanta from Tampa Bay in Expansion Draft, June 25, 1999.

Traded to Vancouver by Atlanta for Vancouver's 4th round choice (Carl Mallette) in 2000 Entry Draft, October 29, 1999.

Signed as a free agent by Toronto, October 1, 2001.

Signed as a free agent by New Jersey, July 8, 2002. Missed majority of 2003–04 due to groin injury vs. NY Rangers, November 15, 2003 that led to his retirement.
