= Jim McKenzie (ice hockey) =

Canadian ice hockey player

- Born: November 3, 1969 (age 57) Gull Lake, Saskatchewan, Canada
- Height: 6 ft 4 in (193 cm)
- Weight: 221 lb (100 kg; 15 st 11 lb)
- Position: Left wing
- Shot: Left
- Played for: Hartford Whalers; Dallas Stars; Pittsburgh Penguins; Winnipeg Jets; Phoenix Coyotes; Mighty Ducks of Anaheim; Washington Capitals; New Jersey Devils; Nashville Predators
- NHL draft: 73rd overall, 1989; Hartford Whalers
- Playing career: 1989–2004

James P. McKenzie (born November 3, 1969) is a Canadian ice hockey coach and former player. He was the current head coach of the USHL Muskegon Lumberjacks after being hired midway through the 2011/12 season.

Selected 73rd overall in the 1989 NHL entry draft by the Hartford Whalers, McKenzie primarily played as an enforcer throughout his career, which combined with his height at 6 feet 4 inches, earned him the nickname "Big Jim". He also played for the Dallas Stars, Pittsburgh Penguins, Winnipeg Jets/Phoenix Coyotes, Mighty Ducks of Anaheim, Washington Capitals, New Jersey Devils, and Nashville Predators. In his 15 seasons in the National Hockey League, McKenzie played 880 regular season games, scoring 48 goals and 52 assists for 100 points, and collecting 1,739 penalty minutes. He also played in 51 playoff games, scoring no points and collecting 38 penalty minutes, holding the record for most games without a point among forwards in an NHL playoff career. He won the Stanley Cup with New Jersey in 2003.

== Career statistics ==
=== Regular season and playoffs ===
			Regular season					Playoffs
Season	Team	League	GP	G	A	Pts	PIM	GP	G	A	Pts	PIM
1985–86	Moose Jaw Warriors AAA	SMHL	36	18	26	44	89	—	—	—	—	—
1985–86	Moose Jaw Warriors	WHL	3	0	2	2	0	—	—	—	—	—
1986–87	Moose Jaw Warriors	WHL	65	5	3	8	125	9	0	0	0	7
1987–88	Moose Jaw Warriors	WHL	62	1	17	18	134	—	—	—	—	—
1988–89	Victoria Cougars	WHL	67	15	27	42	176	8	1	4	5	30
1989–90	Binghamton Whalers	AHL	56	4	12	16	149	—	—	—	—	—
1989–90	Hartford Whalers	NHL	5	0	0	0	4	—	—	—	—	—
1990–91	Springfield Indians	AHL	24	3	4	7	102	—	—	—	—	—
1990–91	Hartford Whalers	NHL	41	4	3	7	108	6	0	0	0	8
1991–92	Hartford Whalers	NHL	67	5	1	6	87	—	—	—	—	—
1992–93	Hartford Whalers	NHL	64	3	6	9	202	—	—	—	—	—
1993–94	Hartford Whalers	NHL	26	1	2	3	67	—	—	—	—	—
1993–94	Dallas Stars	NHL	34	2	3	5	63	—	—	—	—	—
1993–94	Pittsburgh Penguins	NHL	11	0	0	0	16	3	0	0	0	0
1994–95	Pittsburgh Penguins	NHL	39	2	1	3	63	5	0	0	0	4
1995–96	Winnipeg Jets	NHL	73	4	2	6	202	1	0	0	0	2
1996–97	Phoenix Coyotes	NHL	65	5	3	8	200	7	0	0	0	2
1997–98	Phoenix Coyotes	NHL	64	3	4	7	146	1	0	0	0	0
1998–99	Mighty Ducks of Anaheim	NHL	73	5	4	9	99	4	0	0	0	4
1999–2000	Mighty Ducks of Anaheim	NHL	31	3	3	6	48	—	—	—	—	—
1999–2000	Washington Capitals	NHL	30	1	2	3	16	1	0	0	0	0
2000–01	New Jersey Devils	NHL	53	2	2	4	119	3	0	0	0	2
2001–02	New Jersey Devils	NHL	67	3	5	8	123	6	0	0	0	2
2002–03	New Jersey Devils	NHL	76	4	8	12	88	13	0	0	0	14
2003–04	Nashville Predators	NHL	61	1	3	4	88	1	0	0	0	0
NHL totals			880	48	52	100	1739	51	0	0	0	38
