= Jeff Friesen =

Canadian ice hockey player (born 1976)

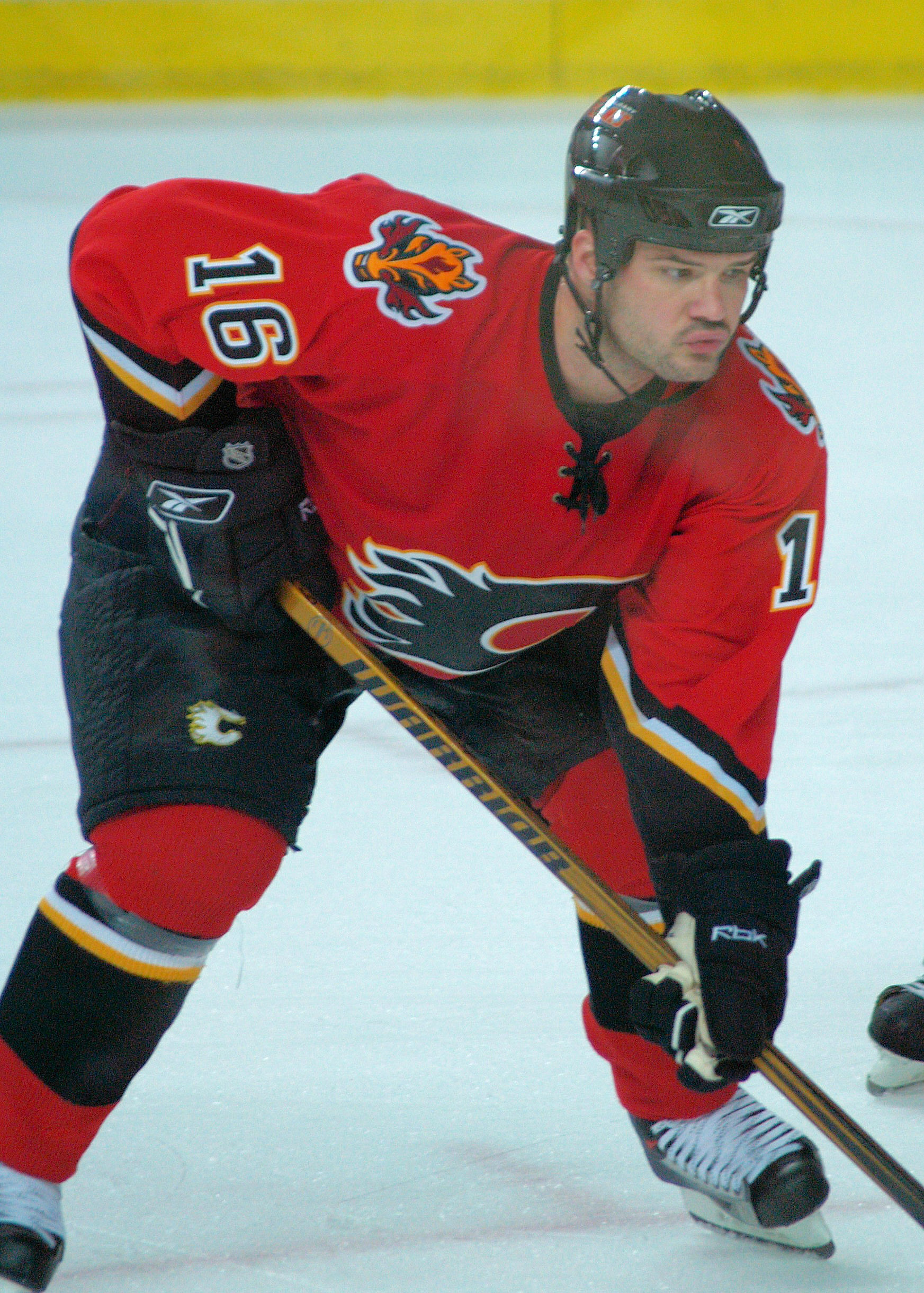
- Friesen with the Calgary Flames in 2007
- Born: August 5, 1976 (age 49) Meadow Lake, Saskatchewan, Canada
- Height: 6 ft 1 in (185 cm)
- Weight: 200 lb (91 kg; 14 st 4 lb)
- Position: Left wing
- Shot: Left
- Played for: San Jose Sharks; Mighty Ducks of Anaheim; New Jersey Devils; Washington Capitals; Calgary Flames; Eisbären Berlin
- National team: Canada
- NHL draft: 11th overall, 1994; San Jose Sharks
- Playing career: 1994–2011

Jeffrey Daryl Friesen (born August 5, 1976) is a Canadian former professional ice hockey player. He played over 800 games in the National Hockey League, spending roughly half his career with the San Jose Sharks, who drafted him in the 1994 NHL entry draft. The rest of his career was spent with the Mighty Ducks of Anaheim, New Jersey Devils, Washington Capitals, and Calgary Flames. He won the Stanley Cup with the Devils in 2003.

== Playing career ==
Friesen played his junior years with the Regina Pats of the Western Hockey League (WHL) where he was Rookie of the Year in 1993. He was selected 11th overall in the first round of the 1994 NHL entry draft by the San Jose Sharks. He played 14 season in the NHL as a winger, originally as a left winger but also as a right winger.

Friesen played nearly seven seasons with the Sharks, becoming their 3rd all-time leading scorer, but was traded to the Mighty Ducks of Anaheim near the end of the 2000–01 season. After playing the following season with the Ducks, he was traded to the New Jersey Devils for the 2002–03 season where he won the Stanley Cup. In the Eastern Conference Finals against the Ottawa Senators that year, Friesen scored the game-winning goal with just under three minutes left in regulation in game seven. It was his third game-winning goal of the series. Then in game seven of the finals, he scored two goals against his former team, the Ducks en route to the Devils' third Stanley Cup championship.

On September 26, 2005, the salary cap-troubled Devils traded Friesen to the Washington Capitals in exchange for a conditional 2006 draft pick. On March 9, 2006, he was moved again to the Ducks for a second-round draft pick, but spent a significant part of the 2005–06 season sidelined with a groin injury.

Friesen was signed by the Calgary Flames on July 5, 2006 to a 1-year $1.6 million contract for the 2006–07 season. After a disappointing season that had Friesen producing six goals and six assists in seventy-two games, the Calgary Flames chose not to re-sign him. He played in the AHL as a left wing for the Lake Erie Monsters before January 29, 2008, when Friesen was released.

Friesen attended the San Jose Sharks' 2008 training camp on a tryout basis. On October 9, 2008, Sharks Executive Vice President and General Manager Doug Wilson announced that Friesen had been released from training camp. On August 29, 2009, Friesen signed a one-year contract with the Eisbären Berlin of the Deutsche Eishockey Liga (DEL).

Friesen is tied with Jamie Baker for the Sharks single-season short-handed goals record with 6, set in the 1997–98 season. On February 21, 2015 he was introduced along with several other former Shark players before the outdoor Stadium Series game vs. the L.A. Kings at Levi's Stadium in Santa Clara.

== Personal life ==
Friesen and his ex-wife Rhonda have a daughter and son together.

== Career statistics ==
=== Regular season and playoffs ===
			Regular season					Playoffs
Season	Team	League	GP	G	A	Pts	PIM	GP	G	A	Pts	PIM
1991–92	Regina Pats	WHL	4	3	1	4	2	—	—	—	—	—
1992–93	Regina Pats	WHL	70	45	38	83	23	13	7	10	17	8
1993–94	Regina Pats	WHL	66	51	67	118	48	4	3	2	5	2
1994–95	Regina Pats	WHL	25	21	23	44	22	—	—	—	—	—
1994–95	San Jose Sharks	NHL	48	15	10	25	14	11	1	5	6	4
1995–96	San Jose Sharks	NHL	79	15	31	46	42	—	—	—	—	—
1996–97	San Jose Sharks	NHL	82	28	34	62	75	—	—	—	—	—
1997–98	San Jose Sharks	NHL	79	31	32	63	40	6	0	1	1	2
1998–99	San Jose Sharks	NHL	78	22	35	57	42	6	2	2	4	14
1999–2000	San Jose Sharks	NHL	82	26	35	61	47	11	2	2	4	10
2000–01	San Jose Sharks	NHL	64	12	24	36	56	—	—	—	—	—
2000–01	Mighty Ducks of Anaheim	NHL	15	2	10	12	10	—	—	—	—	—
2001–02	Mighty Ducks of Anaheim	NHL	81	17	26	43	44	—	—	—	—	—
2002–03	New Jersey Devils	NHL	81	23	28	51	26	24	10	4	14	6
2003–04	New Jersey Devils	NHL	81	17	20	37	26	5	0	0	0	4
2005–06	Washington Capitals	NHL	33	3	4	7	24	—	—	—	—	—
2005–06	Mighty Ducks of Anaheim	NHL	18	1	3	4	8	16	3	1	4	6
2006–07	Calgary Flames	NHL	72	6	6	12	34	5	0	0	0	2
2007–08	Lake Erie Monsters	AHL	5	1	4	5	0	—	—	—	—	—
2009–10	Eisbären Berlin	DEL	53	15	30	45	130	5	1	1	2	0
2010–11	Eisbären Berlin	DEL	30	5	9	14	12	11	1	4	5	2
NHL totals			893	218	298	516	488	84	18	15	33	48

=== International ===
Medal record

Representing Canada

World Championships
Gold medal – first place	1997 Helsinki	
Gold medal – first place	2004 Prague	
Silver medal – second place	1996 Vienna	

World Junior Championships
Gold medal – first place	1994 Frydek-Mistek/Ostrava	
Gold medal – first place	1995 Red Deer	

Year	Team	Event	Result	GP	G	A	Pts	PIM
1994	Canada	WJC	1st place, gold medalist(s)	5	0	2	2	0
1995	Canada	WJC	1st place, gold medalist(s)	7	5	2	7	4
1996	Canada	WC	2nd place, silver medalist(s)	8	2	0	2	6
1997	Canada	WC	1st place, gold medalist(s)	11	3	4	7	16
1999	Canada	WC	4th	7	2	2	4	0
2001	Canada	WC	5th	7	1	3	4	6
2004	Canada	WC	1st place, gold medalist(s)	9	0	1	1	4
Junior totals				12	5	4	9	4
Senior totals				42	8	10	18	32

== Awards ==
=== CHL/WHL ===
- Jim Piggott Memorial Trophy - 1993
- CHL Rookie of the Year - 1993
- CHL All-Rookie Team - 1993

=== NHL ===
- NHL All-Rookie Team - 1995
- Stanley Cup champion - 2003

Awards and achievements
Preceded by Viktor Kozlov	San Jose Sharks first-round draft pick 1994	Succeeded by Teemu Riihijärvi
