= Patrik Eliáš =

Czech ice hockey player (born 1976)

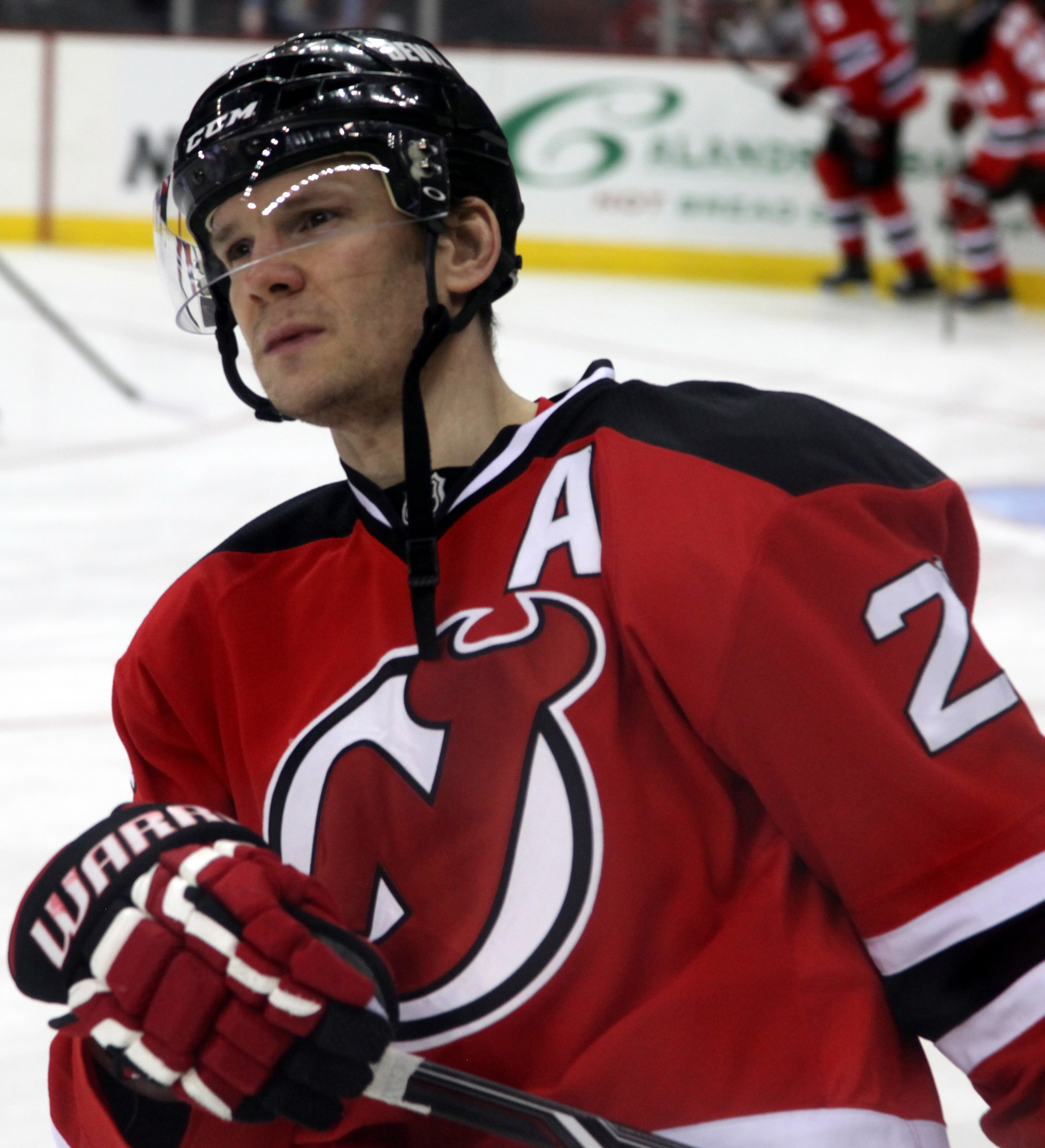
- Eliáš with the New Jersey Devils in 2014
- Born: 13 April 1976 (age 50) Třebíč, Czechoslovakia
- Height: 6 ft 1 in (185 cm)
- Weight: 190 lb (86 kg; 13 st 8 lb)
- Position: Left wing
- Shot: Left
- Played for: Poldi SONP Kladno; New Jersey Devils; LTC Pardubice; JME Znojemští Orli; Metallurg Magnitogorsk
- National team: Czech Republic
- NHL draft: 51st overall, 1994; New Jersey Devils
- Playing career: 1992–2016
- Website: eliaspatrik.com
Medal record
Ice hockey
Olympic Games
Bronze medal – third place	2006 Turin
World Championships
Bronze medal – third place	1998 Switzerland
Bronze medal – third place	2011 Slovakia

Patrik Eliáš (Czech pronunciation: [ˈpatrɪk ˈɛlɪjaːʃ]; born 13 April 1976) is a Czech former professional hockey winger who played 20 seasons in the National Hockey League (NHL), all for the New Jersey Devils.

He was drafted in the second round of the 1994 NHL draft by New Jersey. He played most of the next two seasons in the American Hockey League with multiple call-ups before staying with the Devils for good in the 1997–98 season, where he recorded 18 goals and 37 points that saw him finish as a finalist for the Calder Memorial Trophy and named to the NHL All-Rookie Team. In the 1999–2000 season, he had 35 goals and in the Stanley Cup playoffs, he had 20 points (where he tied for the lead in assists with 13) in 23 games, which included the game-winning goal in Game 7 of the Eastern Conference Finals and the game-winning assist in the sixth and final game of the Stanley Cup Final. He peaked in goals with 40 and was named an NHL First All-Star for the only time. He had 13 points in 24 games of the 2003 playoffs as the Devils won the Stanley Cup Final to give Eliáš his second championship. A four-time selection to the NHL All-Star Game, Eliáš retired in 2016; from 1995 to 2016, he was one of just ten players to record 1,000 points.

Described by long-time Devils executive Lou Lamoriello as an "all-situation player", Eliáš ranks as the all-time leader in franchise history for goals (408), assists (617), and points (1,025), doing so in 1,240 games; he also holds the franchise record for most career game-winning goals (80). He also ranks second among Czech-born players in NHL points, behind Jaromír Jágr. Internationally, Eliáš represented the Czech national team in multiple tournaments, including four Winter Olympics and four World Championships, winning one Olympic bronze medal and two more at the World Championships. In 2018, the Devils retired his jersey, making him the fifth player to receive the honor. He is a member of the Czech Ice Hockey Hall of Fame.

== Early life ==
Eliáš was born on 13 April 1976 in Třebíč, Czechoslovakia to Zdeňka Eliášová and Zdeněk Eliáš. Eliáš and his older brothers Zdenek and Radek played organized hockey in Czechoslovakia, although the latter was forced to retire due to an injury.

== Playing career ==
=== Rookie season and early development (1994–1999) ===
Eliáš was drafted by the New Jersey Devils in the second round, 51st overall, in the 1994 NHL entry draft. He had been surprised by the selection as he believed no Devils scout had ever seen him play. Due to mandatory conscription laws, Eliáš had to show the police his contract in order to be excused from the army.

After being cut from training camp, the Devils coaching staff were set to assign him to a major junior ice hockey team for the 1995–96 season. However, Eliáš convinced them to assign him to their American Hockey League (AHL) affiliate, the Albany River Rats. He scored his first two AHL goals in the team's 1995–96 season opener on 7 October. He later received a two-game suspension for making an "obscene gesture" during a game against the Adirondack Red Wings. Eliáš made his NHL debut on 7 December 1995 against the Toronto Maple Leafs. Due to the sudden nature of the recall, team owner John McMullen flew him on a private jet from Providence, Rhode Island to New Jersey. Upon returning to Albany, Eliáš tied a franchise record by recording two goals and three assists in a single game on 14 February 1996. He finished the regular season with 27 goals and 36 assists for 63 points.

While Eliáš spent the majority of the 1996–97 season in the AHL with the Albany River Rats, he was occasionally recalled to the Devils lineup. He scored his first NHL regular-season goal on 12 December 1996 against the Boston Bruins. Eliáš recorded two goals and three assists through 17 games with the Devils, but found the most success playing alongside Petr Sýkora and Sergei Brylin while with the River Rats. As the Devils qualified for the 1997 Stanley Cup playoffs, Eliáš recorded his first playoff goal on 22 April against the Montreal Canadiens.

Eliáš scored one goal through three games with the Devils to start the 1997–98 season before being sidelined for a week due to back spasms. He was reassigned to the River Rats by head coach Jacques Lemaire on 16 October for a conditioning stint. Lemaire said the reassignment was not because of Eliáš's back problems but because he wanted him to work harder. Within his first two games with the River Rats, Eliáš scored his first professional hat-trick. He was recalled to the NHL shortly thereafter as a temporary injury replacement for Dave Andreychuk, but impressed Lemaire enough to remain in the NHL. Eliáš was recognized as the NHL's Player of the Week on 3 November after scoring five goals and one assist through three games. By the start of December, Eliáš was tied with Václav Prospal for third place in rookie scoring with 10 goals and five assists. He surpassed Prospal by the end of the month and secured first place in rookie scoring in January. Despite continuing to lead all rookies in scoring, Eliáš was limited to two goals over 15 games in February. He was scratched twice before being reassigned to the River Rats on 27 February 1998 to make room for Ken Daneyko. While team general manager Lou Lamoriello admitted that he "deserves to play in the NHL," Eliáš was one of three players the Devils could reassign to the AHL without having to clear waivers. However, he was almost immediately recalled to the NHL as an injury replacement for Scott Daniels. After scoring a goal on 9 March, Eliáš went nearly a month without scoring a goal before breaking the streak on 5 April. Despite his scoring struggles, Eliáš was promoted onto a line with Bobby Holík and Randy McKay midway through March. He finished the regular season ranked second among rookies with 18 goals and third with 37 points. He was subsequently named a finalist for the Calder Memorial Trophy as the NHL's Rookie of the Year.

Eliáš struggled offensively at the start of his sophomore season. After scoring a goal on 16 October against the New York Rangers, he went through a 16-game scoring drought. In part due to his struggles, he was benched by head coach Robbie Ftorek on 19 November. Eliáš eventually scored his third goal of the season on 29 November to break the lengthy drought. In December, Eliáš found success while playing alongside Petr Sýkora and Jason Arnott. Over a five-game period, Eliáš scored seven points while the line combined for 28 goals. Although they were called numerous names throughout their early years together, the "A-Line" became their de facto nickname. Hockey analyst Bill Clement agreed with the choice of "A-Line" because "it's the Devils' No. 1 line, and Jason Arnott is the center. It's simple and straight-forward." After missing five games with the flu, Eliáš returned to the Devils lineup on 26 January. He played a few games on Bobby Holík's line before head coach Robbie Ftorek reunited him with Sýkora and Arnott. In their first game back together, they combined for two goals and three assists in a 4–1 win over the Carolina Hurricanes. However, Eliáš continued to struggle offensively and collected one goal and one assist in the following nine games. Ftorek also scratched him twice in a four-game span due to a perceived lack of effort. After serving as a healthy scratch, Eliáš recorded eight goals and 15 assists through the next 21 games while remaining with Sýkora and Arnott. By the conclusion of the regular season, the trio had combined for 49 goals over 43 games and all three ranked in the top-five in team scoring. Eliáš finished fifth on the team in scoring with 17 goals and 33 assists for 50 points, which helped them qualify for the 1999 Stanley Cup playoffs. In game one of the Eastern Conference quarterfinals against the Pittsburgh Penguins, Eliáš assisted on both of Sýkora's goals to help the Devils clinch a 3–1 win. However, all three members of the "A-Line" struggled to score in the following games. He finished the playoffs with no goals and five assists as the Devils were eliminated by the Penguins.

=== A-line success and Stanley Cup wins (1999–2003) ===
Due to stagnant contract negotiations, Eliáš missed the first few three weeks of the 1999–00 season before agreeing to a three-year contract on 25 October. Despite signing the contract, Eliáš shared his displeasure with the process, stating: "I signed because there was no other way, not because of what they offered me. I think you get screwed when you're a young guy." Upon joining the team, Eliáš recorded one goal over 18 games before scoring five goals in five consecutive games in mid-December. While remaining on a line with Petr Sýkora and Jason Arnott, he scored seven game-winning goals between 14 December and 26 January and maintained a 15-game scoring streak in January. His lengthy streak set a new franchise record for most consecutive games with a goal. When the streak ended on 28 January, he had recorded 15 goals and nine assists for 24 points. Due to his success, Eliáš was named to Team World at the 2000 National Hockey League All-Star Game. He continued to improve following the All-Star Game, and became the first Devils player to reach 30 goals in a season since 1994. He finished the regular season with a team-leading 35 goals and 37 assists, which helped them qualify for the 2000 Stanley Cup playoffs.

Eliáš continued to lead the team in scoring through the playoffs and finished with seven goals and 13 assists for 20 points. In their first-round matchup against the Florida Panthers, Eliáš recorded one goal and three assists. His three points in game four helped clinch the series win for the Devils and advance them to the Eastern Conference semifinals. In their second-round series against the Toronto Maple Leafs, Eliáš assisted on Sýkora's first-period goal in game six to mark the second-fastest goal in franchise playoff history. By the end of the series, he ranked in the top-15 league-wide with six assists through nine games. After eliminating the Maple Leafs, Eliáš and the Devils faced off against the Philadelphia Flyers in the Eastern Conference final. Although the Devils won game one against the Flyers, they lost the following three games and were on the brink of elimination. However, they then became the first team in NHL history to come back from a 3–1 deficit in a conference final and pushed the series to a deciding game seven. Eliáš scored the Devils only two goals of the game to secure a 2–1 win over the Flyers and advance them to the 2000 Stanley Cup Final. The "A-Line" finished with a combined eight goals and nine assists for 17 points over the six-game series. Thanks to his two-goal game, Eliáš held the team lead with seven goals. In game one of the Finals against the Dallas Stars, the "A-Line" combined for four goals and seven assists to lift the Devils to a 7–3 win. In the first period of game six, Sýkora collided with Stars defenceman Derian Hatcher and was transferred to Baylor University Medical Center. Eliáš and Arnott remained linemates for the remainder of the game and combined on the Stanley Cup-clinching goal in double-overtime. Arnott later credited Eliáš for making the goal happen, stating: "What a great pass...He made the whole play possible. I had the easy part." Upon winning the Stanley Cup, Eliáš, Arnott, Scott Stevens, and team trainer Bill Murray brought the trophy to Sýkora's hospital room.

As a result of Arnott's contract dispute and Sýkora's tonsillectomy, Eliáš began the 2000–01 season without his usual linemates. While missing both Arnott and defenseman Scott Niedermayer, the Devils endured a six-game losing streak that matched their franchise record set in 1991. Through their first six-games together, the trio combined for 16 points and Eliáš recorded his first career hat-trick. By 20 December, he had recorded 14 goals and 20 assists for 34 points. While Eliáš ranked second on the team in goals and points, all three members of the "A-Line" saw a dip in production levels through January. This eventually resulted in Larry Robinson splitting up the "A-Line" for a few games at the end of January. While their original split up was short-lived, injuries to Arnott and Sýkora in February resulted in Eliáš played alongside Sergei Nemchinov and Alexander Mogilny. Head coach Robinson praised Eliáš's growth without his usual linemates, stating: "He's using his speed, going to the net, he's finally using his shot more. He's working on his game, staying out for extra practice and shooting the puck. It's nice to see." His individual efforts were further recognized as he was named the NHL's Player of the Week after tallying four goals and seven assists through four games. Once Arnott and Sýkora recovered in early March, the three were reunited on the top line and combined for 11 points in their first game back. However, as the month progressed, Robinson was vocally critical of the "A-Line" and told the media that Arnott "has been carrying those other two kids." Following this comment, Eliáš scored a hat-trick with 8.4 seconds remaining in overtime against the Edmonton Oilers on 18 March. His hat-trick made him the third Devils player to reach 30 goals that season and helped the Devils extend their winning streak to 10 games. On 23 March, Eliáš scored two goals to help the Devils tie the NHL's fourth-longest winning streak in league history. When their streak ended in March, the "A-Line" had combined for 68 total points. Eliáš recorded another hat-trick on 3 April to solidify the Devils' first-place position in the Eastern Conference. Two games later, Eliáš and John Madden set a team record by scoring eight seconds apart in an eventual 5–2 win over the Boston Bruins. His goal also helped him reach the 40-goal plateau for the first time in his career and broke Kirk Muller's franchise record for most points in a season. Eliáš finished the regular season ranked third in the NHL with 96 points. This would stand as the Devils' single-season points record until 2023.

Eliáš's nine goals and 14 assists through the 2001 Stanley Cup playoffs helped the Devils return to the Stanley Cup Final for the second consecutive season. Eliáš opened the Eastern Conference quarterfinals with a goal and two assists to lead the Devils to a 5–1 win over the Carolina Hurricanes. He scored another goal in game six of the series games to help ensure the Devils advanced to the semifinals against the Toronto Maple Leafs. The "A-Line" finished the series with a combined five goals and six assists through six games. However, they struggled in their second-round series against the Maple Leafs and went goalless through their first two games. After a private meeting between the three linemates before game six, Eliáš assisted on Arnott's third period goal to secure a 4–2 win over the Maple Leafs. He then scored two goals in game seven, including the game-winner, to ensure the Devils qualified for the Eastern Conference finals. Over the first four games of the Conference finals against the Pittsburgh Penguins, the "A-Line" combined for eight goals and six assists. Eliáš also set a new franchise playoff record by maintaining a nine-game point streak. He extended his point streak to 10 games as the Devils defeated the Penguins and returned to the Stanley Cup Final for the second consecutive year. He entered game one tied for the team lead with 18 points and ranked first with 11 assists. Through the first four games of the Final, the "A-Line" combined for three goals. After being shutout in game six, the "A-Line" combined for the sole Devils goal in game seven as they lost the Cup to the Colorado Avalanche.

The Devils started the 2001–02 season with four consecutive losses before Eliáš tallied a hat-trick and two assists in a 6–1 win over the San Jose Sharks. He recorded another hat trick on 9 November to help the Devils overcome a two-goal deficit and beat the Maple Leafs 3–2. By mid-November, Eliáš led the "A-Line" with 13 goals and 12 assists. However, the "A-Line's" struggles, as well the Devils drop in the standings, led Robinson to split them up twice in November. While the first time was largely unsuccessful, the second time resulted in the Devils snapping a seven-game winless streak. While playing alongside Bobby Holik and Andreas Salomonsson, Eliáš tallied one assist in the game while Arnott and Sýkora scored one goal each. When Robinson reunited the "A-Line," Eliáš's endured a six-game scoring drought as the team struggled to win games through early December. His struggles crescendoed on 10 December when the "A-Line" was benched for the majority of the third period in their loss to the Columbus Blue Jackets. Following the game, Robinson split up the "A-Line" by placing Eliáš with Scott Gomez and Turner Stevenson and promoting Salomonsson to the first line with Arnott and Sýkora. They remained apart until the start of January when Eliáš and Arnott approached Robinson and asked him to reunite the "A-Line" for the first time since 15 December. However, on 4 January Eliáš began feeling ill due to an infected finger and was eventually hospitalized. Due to his injury, the "A-Line" was once again split up. At the time, he ranked first on the Devils scoring leaderboard with 16 goals and 18 assists. Once he recovered, Eliáš skated with Scott Gomez and Sergei Nemchinov while Christian Berglund remained as the left winger on the "A-Line." As a result of their poor start to the 2001–02 season, the Devils fired Robinson at the end of January and replaced him with Kevin Constantine. Upon returning to the Devils after the 2002 Winter Olympics, Eliáš was shifted into a centreman position while Arnott sat out due to a back injury. In his second game at centre, Eliáš broke a five-game scoring drought with three assists against the New York Rangers. After Arnott was traded to the Dallas Stars, Eliáš joined Joe Nieuwendyk and Jamie Langenbrunner's line. He scored four goals in his first four games with Nieuwendyk and Langenbrunner. The Devils rallied to qualify for the 2002 Stanley Cup playoffs, but were eliminated in the first round by the Carolina Hurricanes. In the offseason, Sýkora was traded to the Mighty Ducks of Anaheim.

As a result of their early elimination in the playoffs, the Devils fired Constantine and replaced him with Pat Burns. Under Burns, the Devils returned to the Stanley Cup Final and won their second Cup in three years in 2003. Eliáš played a key role in New Jersey's Stanley Cup victory by recording seven points (three goals and four assists) in the final series against the Mighty Ducks of Anaheim.

=== Injuries, illness, and captaincy (2003–2008) ===
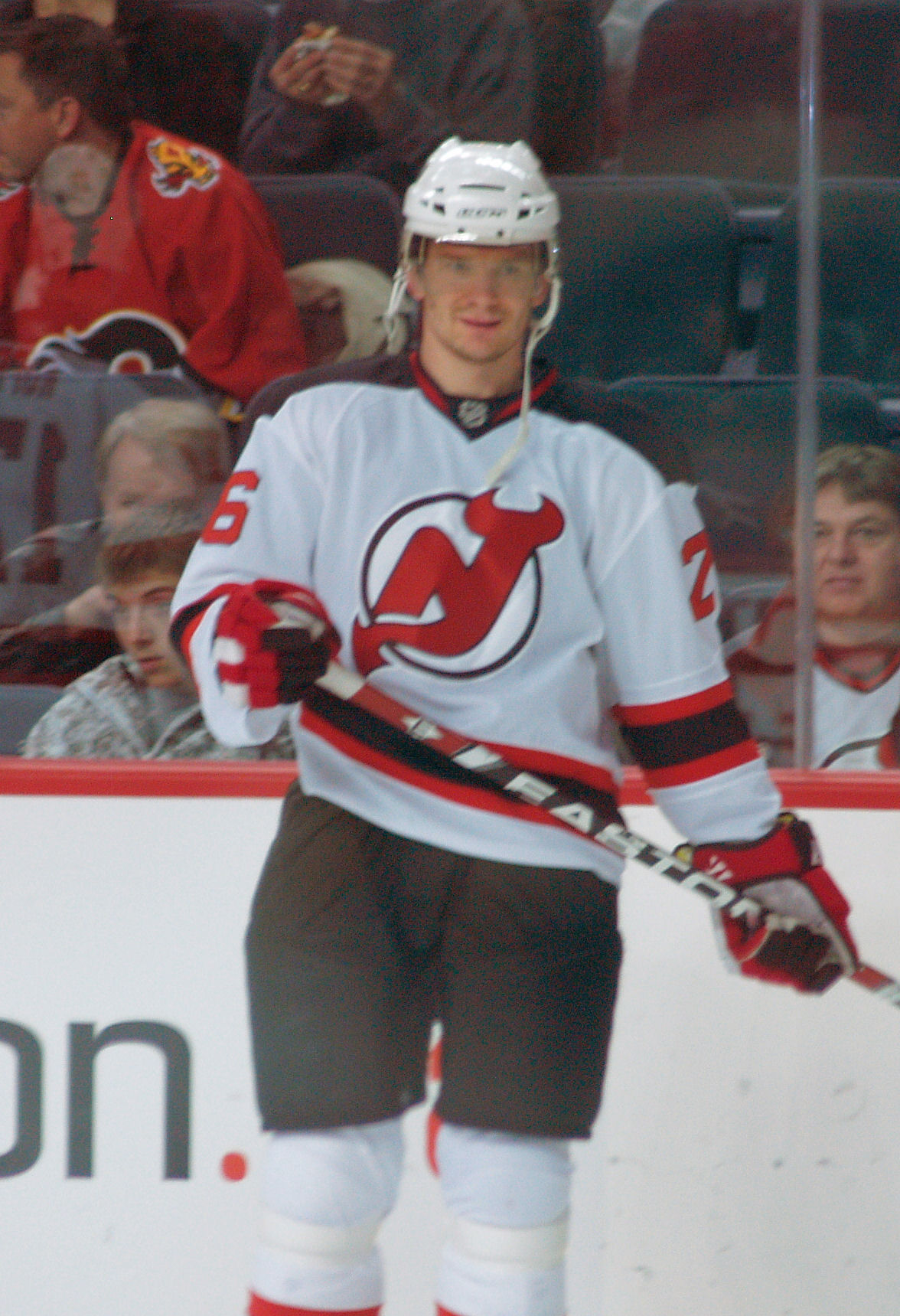
Eliáš before a game in Calgary in 2007

During the 2004–05 NHL lockout, Eliáš played hockey in the Russian Superleague (RSL) for Metallurg Magnitogorsk. While playing in Russia, Eliáš contracted Hepatitis A and spent nearly a month in a Czech hospital. As a result of the illness, he dropped from 195 pounds to 168 and struggled to move around. He subsequently missed the first three months of the 2005–06 season before making his season debut on 3 January 2006, against the Florida Panthers. Eliáš scored two goals and six assists in his first four games back from his illness which helped the Devils maintain a four-game win streak. However, while representing his home country at the 2006 Winter Olympics, Eliáš suffered a back and rib injury that bothered him for the remainder of the season. He was eventually placed on the teams' injured reserve list on 2 March retroactive to 15 February. Eliáš recorded three assists in his first four games back from his injury and finished the regular season with 16 goals and 29 assists.

As the Devils qualified for the 2006 Stanley Cup playoffs, Eliáš played a significant role in the Devils' four-game sweep of the New York Rangers. In game one of their first round series, Eliáš recorded two goals and four assists. His six points were the second most ever scored in one playoff game in franchise history and secured his place as the Devils' leading playoff scorer. He scored twice in game four to help the Devils advance to the second round and finished the playoffs with six goals and 10 assists in nine games. Before free agency began, Eliáš fired his agent and made the decision to represent himself. However, after initiating discussions directly with general manager Lou Lamoriello, he chose to hire Allan Walsh to act as his representative while he was in the Czech Republic. As a free agent, Eliáš received a $7.5 million offer from the Chicago Blackhawks but ultimately accepted a $7 million contract with the Rangers. However, the Rangers contract never came to fruition after the team's general manager refused to include a no-movement clause in the contract. Following this, Eliáš reached out to Lamoriello, and the two sides came to terms on a seven-year, $42 million contract that included the requested no-movement clause.

Eliáš was named the Devils' seventh captain in the team's history on 5 October 2006. However, he later admitted that being named captain hurt his play in the 2006–07 season and contributed to his low goals total. Under new head coach Brent Sutter, Eliáš was stripped of the captaincy at the start of the 2007–08 season and replaced with Jamie Langenbrunner. Eliáš stated that he was never informed of the reason behind Sutter's decision to strip him of his captaincy.

=== Setting franchise records (2008–2012) ===
On 17 March 2009, Eliáš became the Devils' all-time leading point scorer by recording his 702nd NHL regular season point, an assist on Brian Gionta's shorthanded goal. However, as teammate Martin Brodeur also set his own record that night with his 551st win, Eliáš gave the game puck to him instead. Eliáš was the winner of the 2009 Golden Hockey Stick as the best Czech hockey player, ending Jaromír Jágr's four-year streak.

While Eliáš missed the first 13 games of the 2009–10 season with a groin injury, he scored three goals and seven assists over his first 10 games back. He scored his 300th career goal on 12 December 2009, against the Philadelphia Flyers.

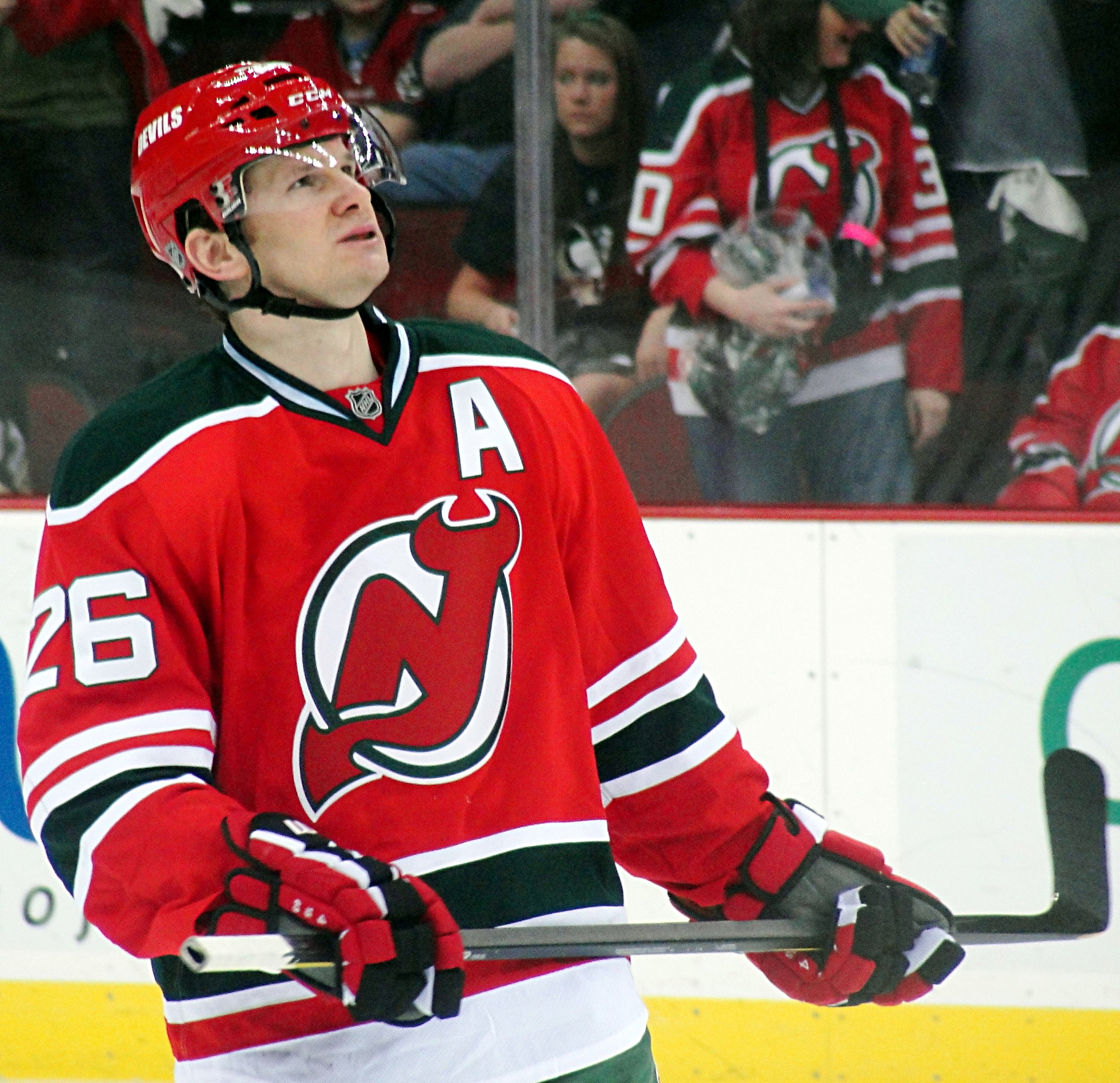
Eliáš in 2012

Eliáš was selected to be the Devils' sole representative at the 2011 NHL All-Star Game in Raleigh, North Carolina. This was his third All-Star appearance, and he was eventually selected by Team Staal in the first-ever NHL All-Star "fantasy draft". On 19 February 2011, Eliáš recorded the 800th NHL point by tallying three assists in a 4–1 win over the Carolina Hurricanes. On 1 April 2011, Eliáš scored his eighth career hat trick in a win over the Philadelphia Flyers.

On 17 December 2011, Eliáš scored his 347th and 348th career goals to surpass John MacLean as the Devils' all-time leading goalscorer. Eliáš played his 1,000th career NHL game on 6 January 2012, against the Florida Panthers. In the game, he scored a goal and recorded two assists in a 5–2 victory. On 3 February 2012, Eliáš was fined $2,500 by the NHL's Department of Player Safety for his hit on Michael Blunden during a game against the Montreal Canadiens.

=== Later years and retirement (2012–2017) ===
On 27 January 2013, Eliáš recorded his 900th career NHL point with one goal and two assists against the Montreal Canadiens. On 4 July 2013, Eliáš signed a three-year $16.5 million contract to remain with the Devils.

Eliáš set numerous personal and franchise records through the second half of the 2015–16 season. On 6 January 2015, Eliáš recorded one goal and two assists to become the 82nd player in NHL history to reach 1,000 career points. On 6 February, he became the 91st player in NHL history to record 400 career goals. His milestone goal also helped lift the Devils to a 4–1 win over the Toronto Maple Leafs.

On 31 March 2017, Eliáš announced his retirement from professional ice hockey.

On 3 August 2017, the Devils announced that his no. 26 would be retired on 24 February 2018, prior to a game against the New York Islanders, the team against whom Eliáš played the most games in his career (91) and scored the most points against (86) over his career. Eliáš became the first forward to have his number retired by the Devils and the fifth Devil overall.

== International play ==
Eliáš played his first game in the national squad in 1998, and has played 40 times for the national team, scoring 20 goals (as of end of season 2010/2011). He was selected as captain of the Czech squad for the 2010 Winter Olympics in Vancouver.

== Personal life ==
Eliáš married Petra Volakova, also a native Czech, in the 2007 off-season. Together they have two daughters. On 10 January 2018, Eliáš became a naturalized citizen of the United States. Due to his experience with Hepatitis A, Eliáš became a UNICEF Goodwill Ambassador in 2006. In his role as an ambassador, he volunteered in Belize with Czech UNICEF in 2008.

== Records ==
- New Jersey Devils record for career points (1025).
- New Jersey Devils record for career goals (408).
- New Jersey Devils record for career assists (617).
- New Jersey Devils all-time leader in playoff goals (45), assists (80), and points (125).
- New Jersey Devils record for most points in a playoff season (23).
- New Jersey Devils record for career game-winning goals (80).
- New Jersey Devils record for career overtime goals (16).
- Most career overtime points (37).
- New Jersey Devils record for career hat tricks (8).
- New Jersey Devils record for career shots on goal (3,201).
- New Jersey Devils record for career power play goals (110).
- Most playoff points in the decade of the 2000s (102)
- Eliáš is the only NHL player to be awarded two penalty shots in overtime. Both occurred in separate games versus the New York Islanders, and in both cases, Eliáš missed the penalty shot.

== Career statistics ==
=== Regular season and playoffs ===
			Regular season					Playoffs
Season	Team	League	GP	G	A	Pts	PIM	GP	G	A	Pts	PIM
1992–93	Poldi SONP Kladno	TCH	2	0	0	0	0	—	—	—	—	—
1993–94	Poldi SONP Kladno	CZE	17	1	2	3	0	11	2	2	4	2
1994–95	Poldi SONP Kladno	CZE	28	4	3	7	37	7	1	2	3	14
1995–96	Albany River Rats	AHL	74	27	36	63	83	4	1	1	2	2
1995–96	New Jersey Devils	NHL	1	0	0	0	0	—	—	—	—	—
1996–97	Albany River Rats	AHL	57	24	43	67	76	6	1	2	3	8
1996–97	New Jersey Devils	NHL	17	2	3	5	2	8	2	3	5	4
1997–98	Albany River Rats	AHL	3	3	0	3	2	—	—	—	—	—
1997–98	New Jersey Devils	NHL	74	18	19	37	28	4	0	1	1	0
1998–99	New Jersey Devils	NHL	74	17	33	50	34	7	0	5	5	6
1999–00	New Jersey Devils	NHL	72	35	37	72	58	23	7	13	20	9
1999–00	HC IPB Pojišťovna Pardubice	CZE	5	1	4	5	31	—	—	—	—	—
1999–00	SK Horácká Slavia Třebíč	CZE-2	2	1	2	3	18	—	—	—	—	—
2000–01	New Jersey Devils	NHL	82	40	56	96	51	25	9	14	23	10
2001–02	New Jersey Devils	NHL	75	29	32	61	36	6	2	4	6	6
2002–03	New Jersey Devils	NHL	81	28	29	57	22	24	5	8	13	26
2003–04	New Jersey Devils	NHL	82	38	43	81	44	5	3	2	5	2
2004–05	HC JME Znojemští Orli	CZE	28	8	20	28	65	—	—	—	—	—
2004–05	Metallurg Magnitogorsk	RSL	17	5	9	14	28	—	—	—	—	—
2005–06	New Jersey Devils	NHL	38	16	29	45	20	9	6	10	16	4
2006–07	New Jersey Devils	NHL	75	21	48	69	38	10	1	9	10	4
2007–08	New Jersey Devils	NHL	74	20	35	55	38	5	4	2	6	4
2008–09	New Jersey Devils	NHL	77	31	47	78	32	7	1	2	3	2
2009–10	New Jersey Devils	NHL	58	19	29	48	40	5	0	4	4	2
2010–11	New Jersey Devils	NHL	81	21	41	62	16	—	—	—	—	—
2011–12	New Jersey Devils	NHL	81	26	52	78	16	24	5	3	8	10
2012–13	New Jersey Devils	NHL	48	14	22	36	22	—	—	—	—	—
2013–14	New Jersey Devils	NHL	65	18	35	53	30	—	—	—	—	—
2014–15	New Jersey Devils	NHL	69	13	21	34	12	—	—	—	—	—
2015–16	New Jersey Devils	NHL	16	2	6	8	10	—	—	—	—	—
NHL totals			1,240	408	617	1,025	549	162	45	80	125	89

=== International ===
Year	Team	Event	GP	G	A	Pts	PIM
1994	Czech Republic	EJC	5	2	5	7	2
1998	Czech Republic	WC	3	1	0	1	0
2002	Czech Republic	OLY	4	1	1	2	0
2004	Czech Republic	WCH	5	2	3	5	10
2006	Czech Republic	OLY	1	0	0	0	2
2008	Czech Republic	WC	7	6	3	9	6
2009	Czech Republic	WC	3	2	0	2	2
2010	Czech Republic	OLY	5	2	2	4	2
2011	Czech Republic	WC	9	4	5	9	6
2014	Czech Republic	OLY	3	0	1	1	0
Junior totals			5	2	5	7	2
Senior totals			40	18	15	33	28

== Awards and honours ==
NHL

- Stanley Cup champion – 2000, 2003
- NHL All-Star Game – 2000, 2002, 2011, 2015
- NHL First All-Star team – 2001
- NHL Plus-Minus Award – 2001 (shared with Joe Sakic)
- NHL All-Rookie team – 1998
- No. 26 Jersey was retired by the New Jersey Devils on 24 February 2018

International

- Golden Hockey Stick – 2009, 2012
- Czech Ice Hockey Hall of Fame – 2022

== See also ==
- List of NHL players with 1,000 games played
- List of NHL players with 1,000 points
- List of NHL players who spent their entire career with one franchise

Awards and achievements
Preceded by Chris Pronger	NHL Plus/Minus Award winner 2001; With: Joe Sakic	Succeeded by Chris Chelios
Preceded by Jaromír Jágr	Golden Hockey Stick; 2009	Succeeded by Tomáš Vokoun
Sporting positions
Preceded by Scott Stevens; Scott Niedermayer	New Jersey Devils captain 2006–07	Succeeded by Jamie Langenbrunner
