= 2000 Stanley Cup Final =

2000 ice hockey championship series

	1	2	3	4	5	6	Total
New Jersey Devils	7	1	2	3	0***	2**	4
Dallas Stars	3	2	1	1	1***	1**	2
- * – Denotes overtime period(s)
- Location(s): East Rutherford: Continental Airlines Arena (1, 2, 5); Dallas: Reunion Arena (3, 4, 6)
- Coaches: New Jersey: Larry Robinson (interim); Dallas: Ken Hitchcock
- Captains: New Jersey: Scott Stevens; Dallas: Derian Hatcher
- National anthems: New Jersey: Arlette Roxburgh; Dallas: Kenny Chesney
- Referees: Don Koharski (1, 3, 6); Bill McCreary (1, 4, 6); Kerry Fraser (2, 4); Dan Marouelli (2, 5); Terry Gregson (3, 5)
- Dates: May 30 – June 10, 2000
- MVP: Scott Stevens (Devils)
- Series-winning goal: Jason Arnott (8:20, second OT)
- Hall of Famers: Devils: Martin Brodeur (2018); Alexander Mogilny (2025); Scott Niedermayer (2013); Scott Stevens (2007); Stars: Ed Belfour (2011); Guy Carbonneau (2019); Brett Hull (2009); Mike Modano (2014); Joe Nieuwendyk (2011); Sergei Zubov (2019); Coaches: Ken Hitchcock (2023); Larry Robinson (1995, player); Officials: Bill McCreary (2014); Ray Scapinello (2008)
- Networks: Canada: (English): CBC (French): SRC; United States: (English): ESPN (1–2), ABC (3–6)
- Announcers: (CBC) Bob Cole and Harry Neale (SRC) Claude Quenneville and Michel Bergeron (ESPN/ABC) Gary Thorne and Bill Clement

The 2000 Stanley Cup Final was the championship series of the National Hockey League's (NHL) 1999–2000 season, and the culmination of the 2000 Stanley Cup playoffs. It was contested by the Eastern Conference champion New Jersey Devils against the Western Conference champion and defending Stanley Cup champion Dallas Stars. The Devils were led by captain Scott Stevens, head coach Larry Robinson and goaltender Martin Brodeur. The Stars were led by captain Derian Hatcher, head coach Ken Hitchcock and goaltender Ed Belfour.

The Devils defeated the defending champion Stars four games to two to win their second Stanley Cup in franchise history. This was the first of two Stanley Cup Final where two relocated teams faced each other; the other being in 2001.

== Paths to the Final ==
=== New Jersey Devils ===
New Jersey entered the playoffs as the fourth seed in the Eastern Conference after finishing the regular season with 103 points. They finished second place in the Atlantic Division. In the playoffs, they first swept the fifth-seeded Florida Panthers. In the second round they defeated the third-seeded Toronto Maple Leafs in six games. In the Eastern Conference finals, the Devils defeated the top-seeded Philadelphia Flyers in seven games (in the process becoming the first team since expansion to come back from a 3-1 deficit later than the second round) to advance to the Final.

=== Dallas Stars ===
Dallas captured the Pacific Division title and entered the playoffs as the second seed in the Western Conference after finishing the regular season with 102 points. In the playoffs, they defeated the seventh-seeded Edmonton Oilers in the first round in five games. In the second round, the Stars defeated the eighth-seeded San Jose Sharks, also in five games. In a rematch of the previous year’s Western Conference finals, the Stars again defeated the Colorado Avalanche in seven games to advance to the Final.

== Game summaries ==
Despite New Jersey being a lower seed in conference play (4) than Dallas (2), New Jersey's 103 points were one more than Dallas, giving them home-ice advantage in the series. The Devils won the Cup in game six on a one-timer goal by Jason Arnott in double overtime. It was their second Stanley Cup overall and first since 1995.

=== Game one ===
May 30	Dallas Stars	3–7	New Jersey Devils	Continental Airlines Arena	Recap

Petr Sykora and Jason Arnott each recorded 4 points for New Jersey in game one, and Ken Daneyko scored his first goal of the playoffs during the second period. Ed Belfour was replaced in the third period by Manny Fernandez after allowing 6 goals on 18 shots. New Jersey would go on to win the game by a score of 7–3, giving them a 1–0 series lead.

Scoring summary
Period	Team	Goal	Assist(s)	Time	Score
1st	NJ	Jason Arnott (5)	Petr Sykora (7) and Patrik Elias (9)	07:22	1–0 NJ
1st	DAL	Darryl Sydor (1)	Jere Lehtinen (3) and Mike Keane (4)	13:13	1–1
2nd	NJ	Ken Daneyko (1)	Sergei Brylin (5) and John Madden (4)	02:52	2–1 NJ
2nd	NJ	Petr Sykora (7)	Patrik Elias (10) and Jason Arnott	10:28	3–1 NJ
2nd	NJ	Scott Stevens (3)	Jay Pandolfo (4) and Brian Rafalski (4)	16:04	4–1 NJ
3rd	NJ	Sergei Brylin (2)	Randy McKay (6)	02:21	5–1 NJ
3rd	NJ	Petr Sykora (8)	Jason Arnott (11) and Patrik Elias (11)	03:02	6–1 NJ
3rd	NJ	Jason Arnott (6) – pp	Bobby Holik (7) and Petr Sykora (8)	05:12	7–1 NJ
3rd	DAL	Jon Sim (1)	Guy Carbonneau (3)	07:43	7–2 NJ
3rd	DAL	Kirk Muller (2)	Guy Carbonneau (4)	07:55	7–3 NJ
Penalty summary
Period	Team	Player	Penalty	Time	PIM
1st	None				
2nd	DAL	Derian Hatcher	Slashing	18:20	2:00
3rd	DAL	Scott Thornton	Roughing	03:35	2:00
3rd	DAL	Dave Manson	Slashing	12:05	2:00
3rd	DAL	Dave Manson	Elbowing	19:55	2:00

Shots by period
Team	1	2	3	Total
Dallas	5	7	6	18
New Jersey	7	9	10	26

=== Game two ===
June 1	Dallas Stars	2–1	New Jersey Devils	Continental Airlines Arena	Recap

In game two, Brett Hull scored twice, including the game winner with four minutes and sixteen seconds remaining in regulation. Ed Belfour made 27 saves to secure a 2–1 for Dallas, tying the series at a game apiece.

Scoring summary
Period	Team	Goal	Assist(s)	Time	Score
1st	DAL	Brett Hull (10)	Mike Modano (11) and Richard Matvichuk (5)	04:25	1–0 DAL
1st	NJ	Alexander Mogilny (4)	Scott Gomez (6) and Scott Stevens (7)	12:42	1–1
2nd	None				
3rd	DAL	Brett Hull (11)	Jere Lehtinen (4) and Mike Modano (11)	15:44	2–1 DAL
Penalty summary
Period	Team	Player	Penalty	Time	PIM
1st	NJ	Claude Lemieux	Holding	06:36	2:00
1st	DAL	Blake Sloan	Roughing	10:56	2:00
1st	NJ	Brian Rafalski	Roughing	10:56	2:00
1st	DAL	Richard Matvichuk	Roughing	13:52	2:00
1st	NJ	Bobby Holik	Roughing	13:52	2:00
1st	DAL	Richard Matvichuk	Roughing	18:27	2:00
2nd	None				
3rd	DAL	Jon Sim	Holding	10:48	2:00

Shots by period
Team	1	2	3	Total
Dallas	3	7	7	17
New Jersey	9	8	11	28

=== Game three ===
June 3	New Jersey Devils	2–1	Dallas Stars	Reunion Arena	Recap

After the teams were tied at one goal apiece in the first period of game three, Petr Sykora scored the game-winning goal on a power play in second period, and Martin Brodeur made 22 saves, giving the Devils a 2–1 victory, and a 2–1 series lead.

Scoring summary
Period	Team	Goal	Assist(s)	Time	Score
1st	DAL	Sylvain Cote (2) – pp	Unassisted	13:38	1–0 DAL
1st	NJ	Jason Arnott (7)	Brian Rafalski (5) and Colin White (5)	18:06	1–1
2nd	NJ	Petr Sykora (9) – pp	Jason Arnott (12) and Brian Rafalski (6)	12:27	2–1 NJ
3rd	None				
Penalty summary
Period	Team	Player	Penalty	Time	PIM
1st	NJ	Sergei Nemchinov	Slashing	12:46	2:00
1st	NJ	Vladimir Malakhov	Interference	13:51	2:00
1st	NJ	Claude Lemieux	Cross-checking	15:02	2:00
2nd	DAL	Brett Hull	Interference	08:09	2:00
2nd	DAL	Sylvain Cote	Elbowing	11:03	2:00
3rd	NJ	Martin Brodeur	Delay of game	15:45	2:00

Shots by period
Team	1	2	3	Total
Dallas	7	9	7	23
New Jersey	10	16	5	31

=== Game four ===
June 5	New Jersey Devils	3–1	Dallas Stars	Reunion Arena	Recap

After the Stars took a 1–0 lead in the second period, the Devils capitalized three times in the third period due to defensive errors by Dallas in the third period to a commanding 3–1 series lead.

Scoring summary
Period	Team	Goal	Assist(s)	Time	Score
1st	None				
2nd	DAL	Joe Nieuwendyk (7) – pp	Darryl Sydor (6) and Brett Hull (12)	18:02	1–0 DAL
3rd	NJ	Sergei Brylin (3)	Alexander Mogilny (3) and Vladimir Malakhov (4)	02:27	1–1
3rd	NJ	John Madden (3) – sh	Sergei Nemchinov (2) and Ken Daneyko (2)	04:51	2–1 NJ
3rd	NJ	Brian Rafalski (2)	Patrik Elias (12)	06:08	3–1 NJ
Penalty summary
Period	Team	Player	Penalty	Time	PIM
1st	DAL	Brenden Morrow	Tripping – Obstruction	14:38	2:00
1st	DAL	Dave Manson	Slashing	17:27	2:00
1st	NJ	Scott Niedermayer	Holding – Obstruction	17:27	2:00
2nd	NJ	Petr Sykora	Hooking	05:45	2:00
2nd	DAL	Mike Keane	Boarding	08:45	2:00
2nd	NJ	Randy McKay	Hooking	11:59	2:00
2nd	NJ	Vladimir Malakhov	Cross-checking	11:59	2:00
3rd	NJ	Colin White	Interference	03:17	2:00
3rd	DAL	Jon Sim	Slashing	11:59	2:00

Shots by period
Team	1	2	3	Total
Dallas	6	7	4	17
New Jersey	8	8	15	31

=== Game five ===
June 8	Dallas Stars	1–0	3OT	New Jersey Devils	Continental Airlines Arena	Recap

With Dallas facing elimination, both goaltenders remained unbeatable to set a record. It set a new record for the longest scoreless tie in a Stanley Cup Final game (106:21), passing the previous record set by Game 4 of the 1996 Stanley Cup Final.

Mike Modano scored the game-winning goal at 6:21 of the third overtime, deflecting a shot from Brett Hull past Martin Brodeur, giving the Stars a 1–0 victory, keeping the Stars' hopes alive and forcing a sixth game back in Dallas.

Scoring summary
Period	Team	Goal	Assist(s)	Time	Score
1st	None				
2nd	None				
3rd	None				
OT	None				
2OT	None				
3OT	DAL	Mike Modano (10)	Brett Hull (13) and Jere Lehtinen (5)	06:21	1–0 DAL
Penalty summary
Period	Team	Player	Penalty	Time	PIM
1st	DAL	Derian Hatcher	Hooking	11:01	2:00
1st	NJ	Bobby Holik	Interference	11:43	2:00
2nd	NJ	Petr Sykora	High-sticking	14:23	2:00
2nd	DAL	Jere Lehtinen	High-sticking	17:01	2:00
3rd	DAL	Brenden Morrow	Tripping – Obstruction	13:45	2:00
OT	None				
2OT	None				
3OT	None				

Shots by period
Team	1	2	3	OT	2OT	3OT	Total
New Jersey	7	11	9	10	8	3	48
Dallas	11	6	5	5	12	2	41

=== Game six ===
June 10	New Jersey Devils	2–1	2OT	Dallas Stars	Reunion Arena	Recap

A scoreless first period gave way to both teams scoring a goal in the span of 69 seconds, with Mike Keane's goal proving crucial to overtime when neither scored in the third period. The first overtime saw no scoring, but in double overtime, Jason Arnott scored the game winning goal past Ed Belfour to win the game for the Devils and give them their second Stanley Cup in five years. Scott Stevens was awarded the Conn Smythe Trophy for his dominant defensive play, unmatched physicality, and leadership during the playoffs.

Scoring summary
Period	Team	Goal	Assist(s)	Time	Score
1st	None				
2nd	NJ	Scott Niedermayer (5) – sh	Claude Lemieux (6) and Jay Pandolfo (5)	05:18	1–0 NJ
2nd	DAL	Mike Keane (2)	Scott Thornton (3) and Mike Modano (13)	06:27	1–1
3rd	None				
OT	None				
2OT	NJ	Jason Arnott (8)	Patrik Elias (13) and Scott Stevens (8)	08:20	2–1 NJ
Penalty summary
Period	Team	Player	Penalty	Time	PIM
1st	NJ	Ken Daneyko	Slashing	04:46	2:00
1st	DAL	Jon Sim	Elbowing	06:54	2:00
1st	NJ	Ken Daneyko	High-sticking	13:45	2:00
2nd	NJ	Brian Rafalski	Holding	03:30	2:00
2nd	DAL	Derian Hatcher	Roughing	13:48	2:00
2nd	NJ	Scott Stevens	Roughing	13:48	2:00
2nd	DAL	Scott Thornton	Roughing	19:21	2:00
2nd	NJ	Colin White	Roughing	19:21	2:00
3rd	None				
OT	NJ	Jason Arnott	Cross-checking	18:43	2:00
2OT	None				

Shots by period
Team	1	2	3	OT	2OT	Total
New Jersey	11	13	7	11	3	45
Dallas	7	9	13	1	1	31

This was the first Final that featured two relocated teams competing for the Stanley Cup, as well as the first Final in which both teams had won the Stanley Cup previously after relocation (the Devils in 1995, and the Stars in 1999).

For the Stars, this was the first time since the New York Islanders lost to the Edmonton Oilers in the 1984 Final that a defending Stanley Cup champion lost in the Final. This would happen again in 2001, as the Devils made a return trip to the Final, but lost in seven games to the Colorado Avalanche.

This was the last Stars' appearance in the Stanley Cup Final until 2020, in which they lost in six games to the Tampa Bay Lightning.

== Team rosters ==
Years indicated in boldface under the "Finals appearance" column signify that the player won the Stanley Cup in the given year.

=== Dallas Stars ===
#	Nat	Player	Position	Hand	Acquired	Place of birth	Finals appearance
20	(Canada)	Ed Belfour	G	L	1997–98	Carman, Manitoba	third (1992, **1999**)
21	(Canada)	Guy Carbonneau	C	R	1995–96	Sept-Îles, Quebec	fifth (**1986**, 1989, **1993**, **1999**)
3	(Canada)	Sylvain Cote	D	R	1999–2000	Quebec City, Quebec	first
35	(Canada)	Manny Fernandez	G	L	1994–95	Etobicoke, Ontario	first (did not play)
44	(Canada)	Aaron Gavey	C	L	1999–2000	Sudbury, Ontario	first (did not play)
2	(United States)	Derian Hatcher – **C**	D	L	1990	Sterling Heights, Michigan	second (**1999**)
16	(United States)	Brett Hull	RW	R	1998–99	Belleville, Ontario	third (1986, **1999**)
12	(Canada)	Mike Keane	RW	R	1997–98	Winnipeg, Manitoba	fifth (1989, **1993**, **1996**, **1999**)
15	(United States)	Jamie Langenbrunner	RW	R	1993	Cloquet, Minnesota	second (**1999**)
26	(Finland)	Jere Lehtinen	RW	R	1992	Espoo, Finland	second (**1999**)
36	(Russia)	Roman Lyashenko	C	R	1997	Murmansk, Soviet Union	first
6	(Canada)	Dave Manson	D	L	1999–2000	Prince Albert, Saskatchewan	first
29	(Canada)	Grant Marshall	RW	R	1994–95	Port Credit, Ontario	second (**1999**)
24	(Canada)	Richard Matvichuk	D	L	1991	Edmonton, Alberta	second (**1999**)
9	(United States)	Mike Modano – **A**	C	L	1988	Livonia, Michigan	third (1991, **1999**)
45	(Canada)	Brenden Morrow	LW	L	1997	Carlyle, Saskatchewan	first
22	(Canada)	Kirk Muller	C	L	1999–2000	Kingston, Ontario	second (**1993**)
25	(Canada)	Joe Nieuwendyk – **A**	C	L	1995–96	Oshawa, Ontario	third (**1989**, **1999**)
4	(Canada)	Jamie Pushor	D	R	1999–2000	Lethbridge, Alberta	second (**1997**; did not play)
49	(Canada)	Jon Sim	LW	L	1996	New Glasgow, Nova Scotia	second (**1999**; did not play)
10	(Canada)	Brian Skrudland	C	L	1997–98	Peace River, Alberta	fifth (**1986**, 1989, 1996, **1999**)
11	(United States)	Blake Sloan	RW	R	1998–99	Park Ridge, Illinois	second (**1999**)
5	(Canada)	Darryl Sydor	D	L	1995–96	Edmonton, Alberta	third (1993, **1999**)
17	(Canada)	Scott Thornton	LW	L	1999–2000	London, Ontario	first
56	(Russia)	Sergei Zubov – **A**	D	R	1996–97	Moscow, Soviet Union	third (**1994**, **1999**)

=== New Jersey Devils ===
#	Nat	Player	Position	Hand	Acquired	Place of birth	Finals appearance
25	(Canada)	Jason Arnott – **A**	C	R	1997–98	Collingwood, Ontario	first
6	(Canada)	Brad Bombardir	D	L	1990	Powell River, British Columbia	first (did not play)
30	(Canada)	Martin Brodeur	G	L	1990	Montreal, Quebec	second (**1995**)
10	(Canada)	Steve Brule	RW	R	1993	Montreal, Quebec	first (did not play)
18	(Russia)	Sergei Brylin	LW/C	L	1992	Moscow, Soviet Union	second (**1995**)
3	(Canada)	Ken Daneyko	D	L	1982	Windsor, Ontario	second (**1995**)
26	(Czech Republic)	Patrik Elias	LW	L	1994	Třebíč, Czechoslovakia	first
23	(United States)	Scott Gomez	C	L	1998	Anchorage, Alaska	first
16	(Czech Republic)	Bobby Holik	LW	R	1992–93	Jihlava, Czechoslovakia	second (**1995**)
15	(Canada)	Steve Kelly	C	L	1998–99	Vancouver, British Columbia	first (did not play)
22	(Canada)	Claude Lemieux	RW	R	1999–2000	Buckingham, Quebec	fifth (**1986**, 1989, **1995**, **1996**)
11	(Canada)	John Madden	C	L	1997–98	Toronto, Ontario	first
7	(Russia)	Vladimir Malakhov	D	L	1999–2000	Sverdlovsk, Soviet Union	first
21	(Canada)	Randy McKay – **A**	RW	R	1991–92	Montreal, Quebec	second (**1995**)
89	(Russia)	Alexander Mogilny	RW	L	1999–2000	Khabarovsk, Soviet Union	first
12	(Russia)	Sergei Nemchinov	C	L	1998–99	Moscow, Soviet Union	second (**1994**)
27	(Canada)	Scott Niedermayer	D	L	1991	Edmonton, Alberta	second (**1995**)
29	(Poland)	Krzysztof Oliwa	LW	L	1993	Tychy, Poland	first (did not play)
20	(United States)	Jay Pandolfo	LW	L	1993	Winchester, Massachusetts	first
28	(United States)	Brian Rafalski	D	R	1999–2000	Dearborn, Michigan	first
4	(Canada)	Scott Stevens – **C**	D	L	1991–92	Kitchener, Ontario	second (**1995**)
17	(Czech Republic)	Petr Sykora	RW	L	1995	Plzeň, Czechoslovakia	first
31	(United States)	Chris Terreri	G	L	1998–99	Providence, Rhode Island	second (**1995**)
5	(Canada)	Colin White	D	L	1996	New Glasgow, Nova Scotia	first

== Stanley Cup engraving ==
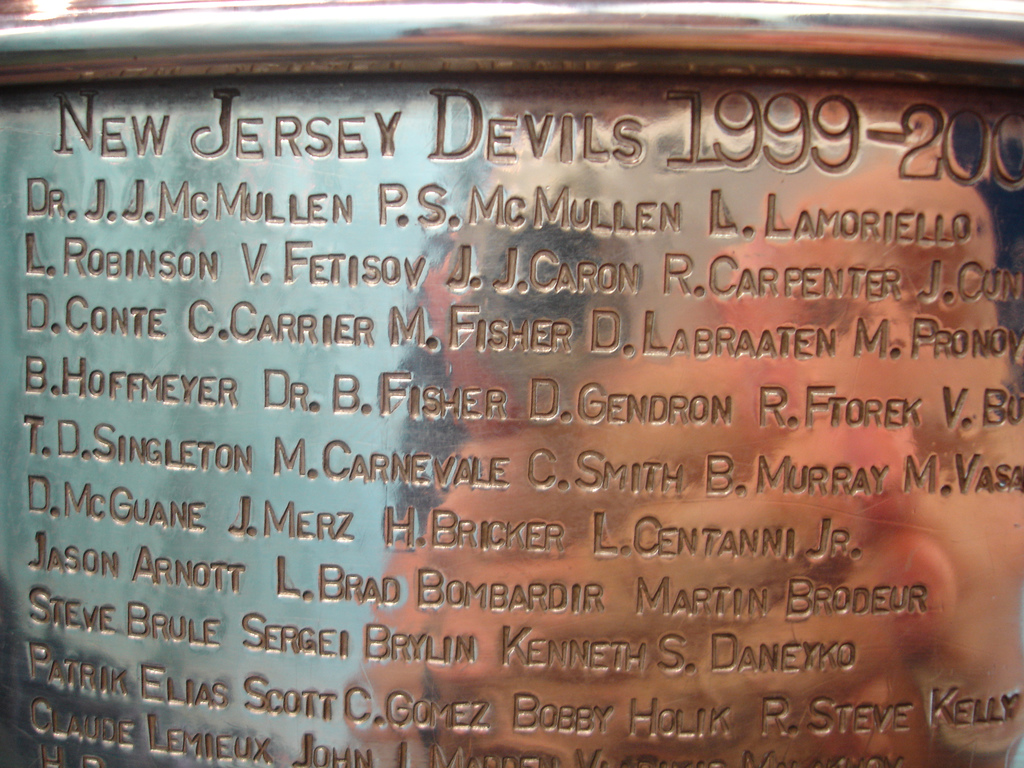
The names of the 1999–2000 New Jersey Devils players, coaching staff and executives, engraved on the Stanley Cup

The 2000 Stanley Cup was presented to Devils captain Scott Stevens by NHL Commissioner Gary Bettman following the Devils 2–1 double overtime win over the Stars in game six.

The following Devils players and staff had their names engraved on the Stanley Cup

1999–2000 New Jersey Devils

=== Players ===
Centres

- 10 Steve Brule ‡
- 11 John Madden
- 12 Sergei Nemchinov
- 15 Steve Kelly ‡
- 23 Scott Gomez
- 25 Jason Arnott (A)

Wingers

- 16 Bobby Holik
- 17 Petr Sykora
- 18 Sergei Brylin*
- 20 Jay Pandolfo
- 21 Randy McKay (A)
- 22 Claude Lemieux
- 26 Patrik Elias
- 29 Krzysztof Oliwa †
- 89 Alexander Mogilny

Defencemen

- 2 Ken Sutton ‡
- 4 Scott Stevens (C)
- 3 Ken Daneyko
- 5 Colin White
- 6 Brad Bombardir ‡
- 7 Vladimir Malakhov
- 27 Scott Niedermayer
- 28 Brian Rafalski

Goaltenders

- 30 Martin Brodeur
- 31 Chris Terreri
- * Played both centre and wing.
- † Did not play or dress in the Final.
- ‡ Exemption granted to engrave the name of a player who did not automatically qualify. (Note: Automatic qualification for a player's name to be engraved on the Stanley Cup: Playing in (for a goaltender, dressing for) at least one Stanley Cup Final game or at least half of regular season games for the Stanley Cup winning team.)

=== Coaching and administrative staff ===
- John J. McMullen (Owner/Chairman/Governor), Peter McMullen (Vice President), Lou Lamoriello (President/General Manager)
- Larry Robinson (Interim Head Coach), Viacheslav Fetisov (Asst. Coach), Bobby Carpenter Jr. (Asst. Coaches), Jacques Caron (Goaltending Coach), John Cunniff (AHL Coach)
- David Conte (Director of Scouting), Claude Carrier (Scout), Milt Fisher (Scout), Dan Labraatan (Scout), Marcel Pronovost (Scout)
- Bob Hoffmeyer (Scout), Barry Fisher (Head Team Physician), Dennis Gendron (AHL Asst. Coach), Robbie Ftorek (Coach/Scout), Vladimir Bure (Consultant)
- Taran Singelton (Video Coordinator), Marie Carnevale (Hockey Operations-Ass't to President-General Manager), Callie Smith (Scouting Staff Asst.), Bill Murray (Medical Trainer), Michael Vasalani (Strength-Conditioning Coordinator)
- Dana McGuane (Equipment Manager), Juergen Merz (Message Therapist), Harry Bricker (Asst. Equipment Manager), Lou Centanni (Asst. Equipment Manager)

=== Engraving notes ===
- New Jersey successfully requested an exemption to engrave the names of four players who did not automatically qualify.
  - #6 Brad Bombardir (D) played in 32 regular-season games and 1 playoff game.
  - #15 Steve Kelly (C) played in 1 regular-season game and 10 playoff games, four of the ten in the Eastern Conference finals.
  - #2 Ken Sutton (D) joined the team from the minors. He played in 6 regular-season games, but was a healthy scratch for the entire playoffs.
  - #10 Steve Brule (C) did not play in the regular season, but played in 1 game of the Eastern Conference finals.
- Krzysztof Oliwa became the first Polish-born and trained player to win the Stanley Cup. He played 69 regular-season games for the Devils, but missed the whole playoffs due to injury. Oliwa qualified to play more than half of the regular-season games.
- Larry Robinson was promoted from assistant coach to head coach with only eight games left in the regular season to replace Robbie Ftorek. Ftorek stayed on as a scout for the rest of the season, and the NHL allowed his name to be included on the Stanley Cup. Robinson became the first interim head coach in NHL history to guide a team to a Stanley Cup championship.
- 14 members were engraved with an initial and two full names.
- #24 Willie Mitchell (D – 2 regular season games) did not play in the playoffs (he was a healthy scratch). He was on the roster during the Final, but was left off the Stanley Cup engraving due to not qualifying. He later won the Stanley Cup with the Los Angeles Kings in 2012 (against the Devils) and 2014.
- Deron Quint (D – 50 regular season games for Phoenix, and 4 for New Jersey) (joined in a March 7 trade for Lyle Odelein) was not engraved on the Stanley Cup because New Jersey suspended him for failing to report to the minors for conditioning purposes. Quint wore #2 when playing for New Jersey, but his number became available when he was suspended by the team. #2 was taken by Ken Sutton later in the season.
- Rob McLean (Consultant) – Still awarded a Stanley Cup Ring, and on the team picture.

== Broadcasting ==
In Canada, the series was televised on CBC. In the United States, this was the first year under the new joint American TV contract with the Disney-owned networks ESPN and ABC, with ESPN airing the first two games of the Cup Final and ABC broadcasting the rest of the series. Devils team broadcasters Mike Miller and Randy Velischek called the series on local radio on WABC–AM 770 in New York City. In Dallas, Stars broadcasters Ralph Strangis and Daryl Reaugh called the series on WBAP 820 AM.

== See also ==
- 1999–2000 NHL season
- 2000 Stanley Cup playoffs
- List of Stanley Cup champions

== Notes ==
Preceded by Dallas Stars; 1999	New Jersey Devils; Stanley Cup champions 2000	Succeeded by Colorado Avalanche; 2001
