= Petr Sýkora =

Czech ice hockey player (born 1976)

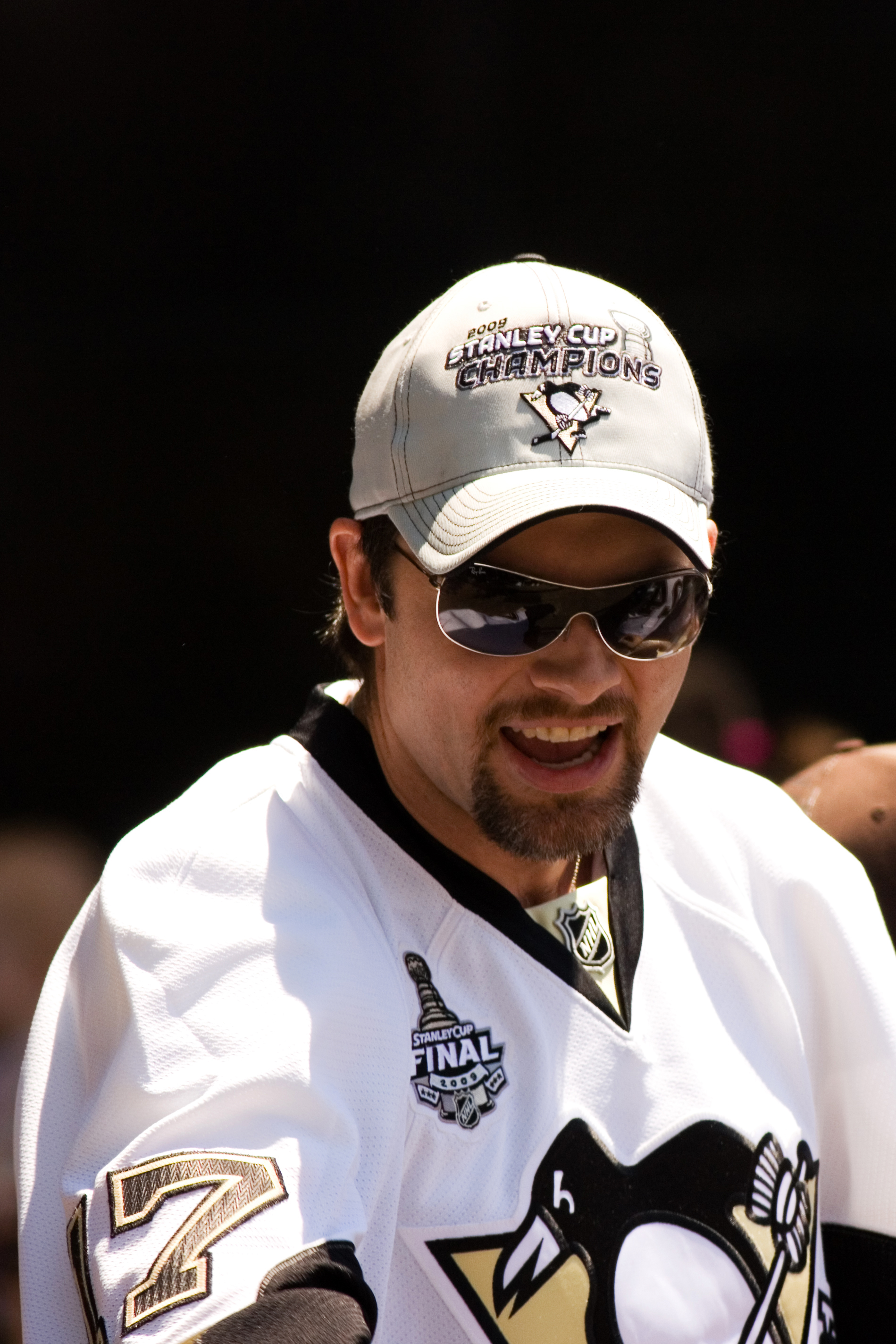
- Sýkora with the Pittsburgh Penguins in 2009
- Born: November 19, 1976 (age 49) Plzeň, Czechoslovakia
- Height: 6 ft 0 in (183 cm)
- Weight: 190 lb (86 kg; 13 st 8 lb)
- Position: Right wing
- Shot: Left
- Played for: HC Škoda Plzeň; New Jersey Devils; Mighty Ducks of Anaheim; Metallurg Magnitogorsk; New York Rangers; Edmonton Oilers; Pittsburgh Penguins; Minnesota Wild; Dinamo Minsk; SC Bern
- National team: Czech Republic
- NHL draft: 18th overall, 1995; New Jersey Devils
- Playing career: 1992–2011

Petr Sýkora (Czech pronunciation: [ˈpɛtr̩ ˈsiːkora]; born November 19, 1976) is a Czech former professional ice hockey right winger who played in the National Hockey League (NHL) for the New Jersey Devils, Mighty Ducks of Anaheim, New York Rangers, Edmonton Oilers, Pittsburgh Penguins, and Minnesota Wild. Sýkora played in six Stanley Cup Finals in his NHL career, winning the Stanley Cup twice, first in 2000 with the Devils, and then in 2009 with the Penguins.

== Playing career ==
Before being drafted, Sýkora spent several seasons in the Czechoslovak Extraliga and the International Hockey League (IHL). As a Cleveland Lumberjack, Sýkora became the youngest player ever to play in the IHL at 17 years and 71 days. He has also played for the IHL's Detroit Vipers.

In the 1995 NHL entry draft, Sýkora was drafted in the first round, 18th overall, by the New Jersey Devils. He began his NHL career in 1995–96 with New Jersey, posting 42 points in his rookie campaign, as well as being chosen as the NHL Rookie of the Month for December. His career took off in his fourth NHL season, recording a breakout 72 points, which still stands as the second highest total of his career. As part of the Devils' effective "A-line," with Patrik Eliáš and Jason Arnott, he helped lead the team to a Stanley Cup in 2000 against the Dallas Stars. However, in the sixth and deciding game in Dallas, Sýkora suffered an injury and ended up in the hospital. When the Devils won the game to win the Stanley Cup, Devils Head Coach Larry Robinson and linemate Patrik Eliáš wore Sýkora's jersey for him. The team also brought the trophy to Sýkora in the hospital. The next season, Sýkora and the Devils were only a game away from repeating as Stanley Cup champions, but lost in the seventh game to the Colorado Avalanche. That year, Sýkora recorded career highs with 35 goals, 46 assists and 81 points.

However, the next season, Sýkora's offensive production dropped to just 48 points, and the before the start of the 2002–03 season, he was traded to the Mighty Ducks of Anaheim for forward Jeff Friesen and defenceman Oleg Tverdovsky. In his first season with Anaheim, Sýkora appeared in his third Stanley Cup Final, but lost to his former Devils teammates. En route to the Final, he scored the game-winning, quintuple-overtime goal in the fourth-longest playoff game in NHL history in game one of the Western Conference Semi-finals against the Dallas Stars.

While the 2004–05 NHL lockout was in effect, Sýkora played for Metallurg Magnitogorsk of the Russian Superleague (RSL), scoring 31 points in 45 games. As NHL play resumed in 2005–06, Sýkora requested to be traded from Anaheim and on January 9, 2006, the New York Rangers acquired Sýkora in exchange for young defenceman Maxim Kondratiev and the return of a fourth-round draft pick the Rangers had previously traded to Anaheim.

After completing the season with New York, it was announced on July 7, 2006, that Sýkora would not return to the Rangers, and he was subsequently signed to a one-year deal with the Edmonton Oilers. On a line with countryman Aleš Hemský, Sýkora maintained the previous few seasons' scoring output and managed 53 points.

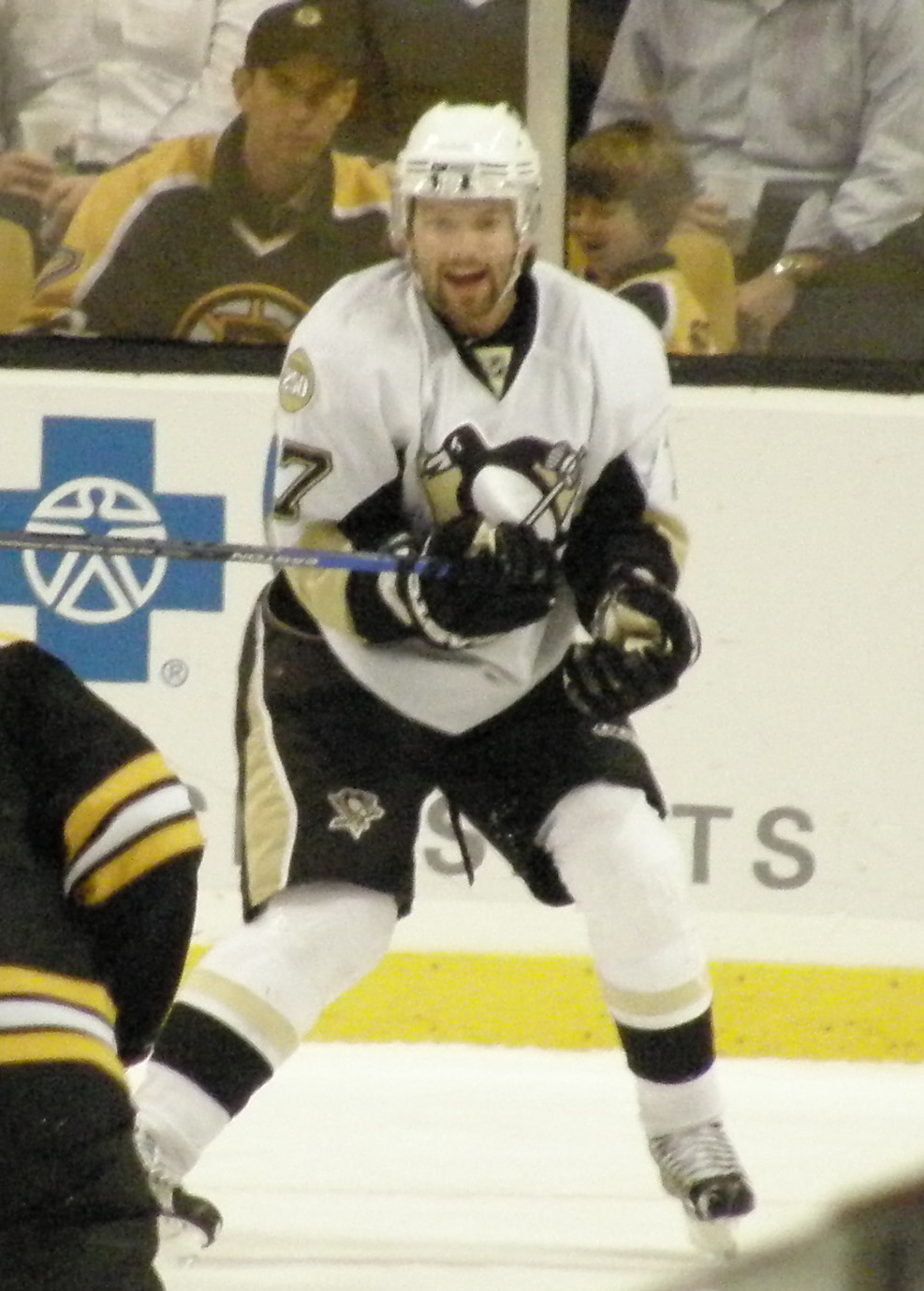
Sýkora as a member of the Penguins in February 2008.

In July 2007, Sýkora signed a two-year contract with the Pittsburgh Penguins as an unrestricted free agent. After initially playing with Sidney Crosby, Sýkora was later lined up with Evgeni Malkin after Crosby suffered an injury towards the end of the season. Benefiting from his high-caliber linemates, Sýkora enjoyed his best offensive season since 2000–01, tallying 63 points.

Reaching the 2008 Stanley Cup Final against the Detroit Red Wings, Sýkora scored a triple-overtime goal on the powerplay in game five after previously telling on-ice reporter Pierre McGuire he would score the game-winner. With the Penguins down 3–1 in the series, Sýkora's goal forced a game six. However, the Penguins could not stave off elimination for a second straight game and lost the Cup to Detroit. The series marked Sýkora's fourth time playing in a Stanley Cup Final.

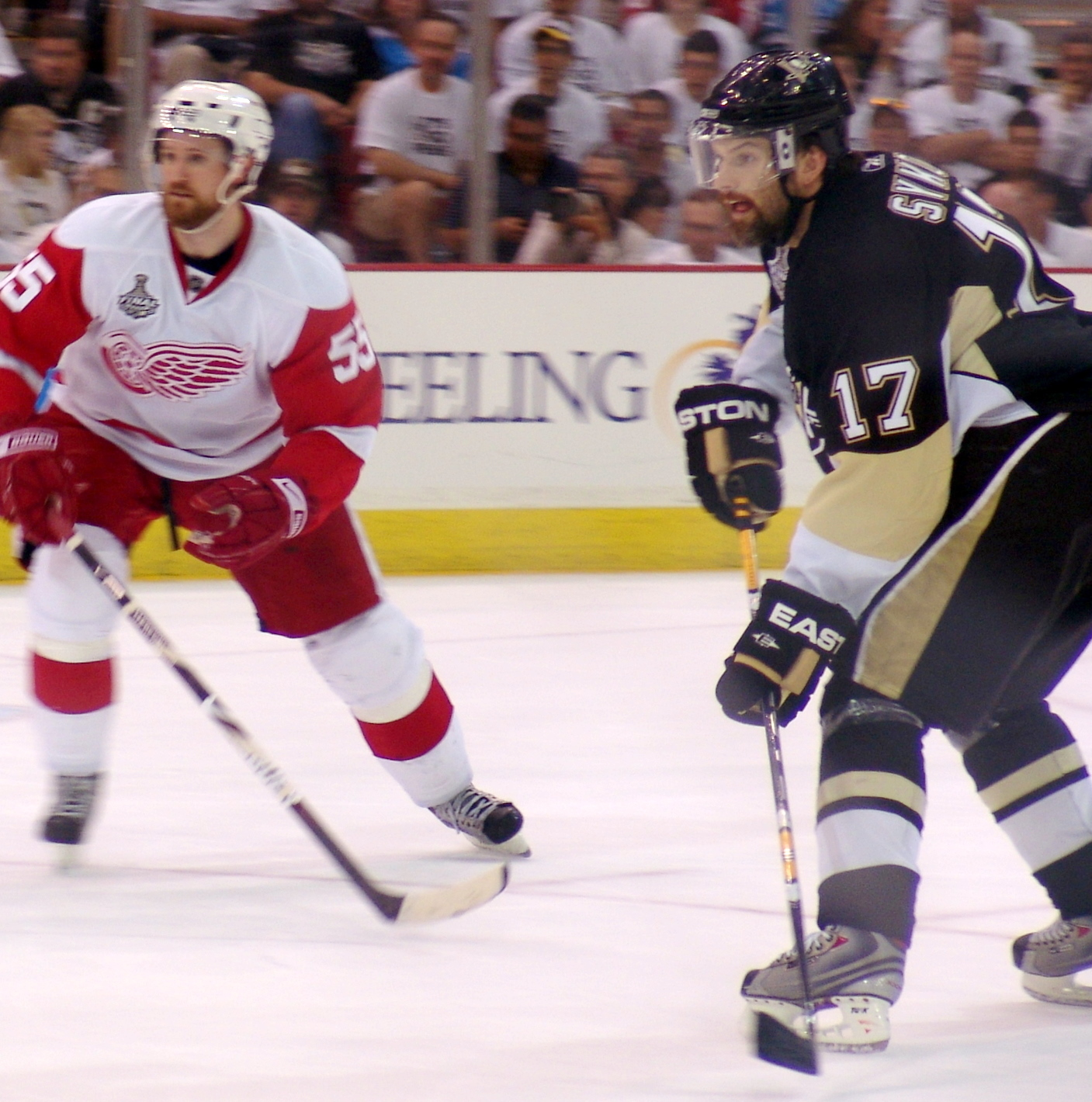
Sýkora in 2009 Stanley Cup Final game six.

The following season, on December 11, 2008, Sýkora scored his eighth, ninth and tenth goals of the season for his first career NHL hat-trick against the New York Islanders at Mellon Arena. Sýkora had previously recorded 38 career two-goal games in his career, the all-time NHL record for most two-goal games without a single hat-trick. Later that season, on April 7, 2009, Sýkora scored his 300th career NHL goal in a 6–4 victory against the Tampa Bay Lightning. In early May 2009, Sýkora began struggling with a shoulder injury. He finished his second season in Pittsburgh with 25 goals and 46 points over 76 games. Bolstering their lineup at the trade deadline, the Penguins acquired wingers Bill Guerin and Chris Kunitz, resulting in decreased ice time for Sýkora. During the 2009 playoffs, he was regularly made a healthy scratch. He played in seven of the Penguins' 24 post-season games as the team returned to the Stanley Cup Final against the Red Wings for the second straight year. Sýkora made his first appearance of the series in game six, but injured his right foot blocking a shot six minutes into the contest. Sidelined for the deciding game seven, he forced his swelled foot into a skate to join the Penguins on the ice for their post-game celebration after defeating the Red Wings 2–1. Although Sýkora won the trophy with the Devils in 2000, he was unable to lift the Stanley Cup after a hit sent him to the hospital the night of the victory.

In the off-season, Sýkora was not re-signed by the Penguins and he became an unrestricted free agent on July 1, 2009. Without an NHL contract, Sýkora accepted a tryout with the Minnesota Wild on September 14. Three days later, the Wild signed him to a one-year, $1.6 million contract on September 17. He suffered a concussion early in the 2009–10 season, however, and was sidelined for two months. Through 14 games, he had recorded just three points and was placed on waivers by the Wild on January 19, 2010. On January 28, the Wild announced that Sýkora had cleared unconditional waivers, officially making him an unrestricted free agent.

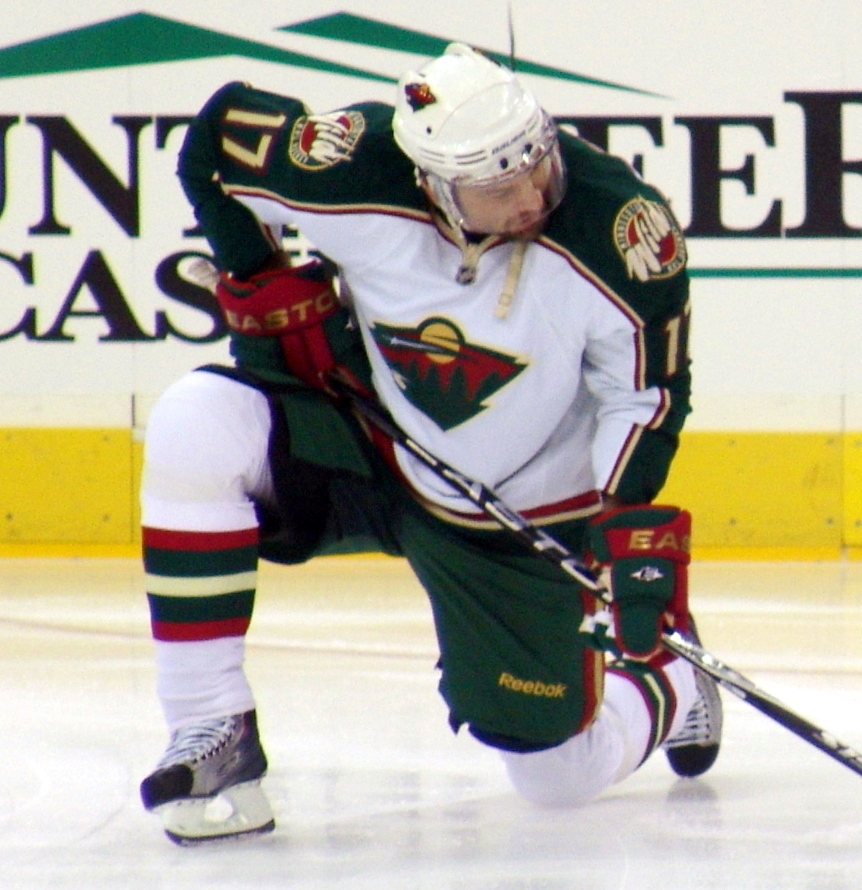
Sýkora with the Wild, October 2009.

Without an NHL contract, Sýkora returned to Europe, signing with HC Plzeň to start the 2010–11 season. After recording 13 points (five goals and seven assists) over 13 games while playing on a line with Martin Straka and Jan Kovář, he signed a tryout contract with Dinamo Minsk of the Kontinental Hockey League (KHL) on November 11, 2010. Over 28 games in the KHL, he scored eight goals and 15 points.

On September 12, 2011, it was announced that Sýkora would attend the New Jersey Devils' training camp on a tryout, hoping to return to the team that drafted him into the NHL. On October 5, 2011, he signed a one-year contract with the Devils worth $650,000.

On March 2, 2012, Sýkora played in his 1,000th career NHL game.

== International play ==
Medal record

Representing Czech Republic

Ice hockey

World Championships
Gold medal – first place	1999 Lillehammer	
Gold medal – first place	2005 Vienna	
Bronze medal – third place	1998 Zurich	

European Junior Championships
Bronze medal – third place	1993 Poland	
Bronze medal – third place	1994 Finland	

In 2002, Sýkora was selected to play for the Czech Republic in the Winter Olympics in Salt Lake City, where the team placed seventh. Two years later, Sýkora also represented the Czech Republic in the 2004 World Cup. Sýkora has also won three Men's World Ice Hockey Championships medals, one bronze (1998) and two gold medals (1999 and 2005).

== Career statistics ==
=== Regular season and playoffs ===
			Regular season					Playoffs
Season	Team	League	GP	G	A	Pts	PIM	GP	G	A	Pts	PIM
1991–92	HC Škoda Plzeň	TCH U20	30	50	50	100	—	—	—	—	—	—
1992–93	HC Škoda Plzeň	TCH	19	12	5	17	—	—	—	—	—	—
1993–94	HC Škoda Plzeň	ELH	37	10	16	26	8	—	—	—	—	—
1993–94	Cleveland Lumberjacks	IHL	13	4	5	9	8	—	—	—	—	—
1994–95	Detroit Vipers	IHL	29	12	17	29	16	—	—	—	—	—
1995–96	Albany River Rats	AHL	5	4	1	5	0	—	—	—	—	—
1995–96	New Jersey Devils	NHL	63	18	24	42	32	—	—	—	—	—
1996–97	Albany River Rats	AHL	43	20	25	45	48	4	1	4	5	2
1996–97	New Jersey Devils	NHL	19	1	2	3	4	2	0	0	0	2
1997–98	Albany River Rats	AHL	2	4	1	5	0	—	—	—	—	—
1997–98	New Jersey Devils	NHL	58	16	20	36	22	2	0	0	0	0
1998–99	New Jersey Devils	NHL	80	29	43	72	22	7	3	3	6	4
1999–2000	New Jersey Devils	NHL	79	25	43	68	26	23	9	8	17	10
2000–01	New Jersey Devils	NHL	73	35	46	81	32	25	10	12	22	12
2001–02	New Jersey Devils	NHL	73	21	27	48	44	4	0	1	1	0
2002–03	Mighty Ducks of Anaheim	NHL	82	34	25	59	24	21	4	9	13	12
2003–04	Mighty Ducks of Anaheim	NHL	81	23	29	52	34	—	—	—	—	—
2004–05	Metallurg Magnitogorsk	RSL	45	18	13	31	46	5	2	3	5	8
2005–06	Mighty Ducks of Anaheim	NHL	34	7	13	20	28	—	—	—	—	—
2005–06	New York Rangers	NHL	40	16	15	31	22	4	0	0	0	0
2006–07	Edmonton Oilers	NHL	82	22	31	53	40	—	—	—	—	—
2007–08	Pittsburgh Penguins	NHL	81	28	35	63	41	20	6	3	9	16
2008–09	Pittsburgh Penguins	NHL	76	25	21	46	36	7	0	1	1	0
2009–10	Minnesota Wild	NHL	14	2	1	3	8	—	—	—	—	—
2010–11	HC Plzeň 1929	ELH	13	5	8	13	14	—	—	—	—	—
2010–11	Dinamo Minsk	KHL	28	8	7	15	58	7	1	1	2	4
2011–12	New Jersey Devils	NHL	82	21	23	44	40	18	2	3	5	6
2012–13	SC Bern	NLA	5	2	2	4	0	4	1	2	3	2
NHL totals			1,017	323	398	721	455	133	34	40	74	62

=== International ===
Year	Team	Event	GP	G	A	Pts	PIM
1993	Czech Republic	EJC	6	6	0	6	20
1994	Czech Republic	EJC	5	5	4	9	4
1994	Czech Republic	WJC	7	6	2	8	6
1995	Czech Republic	WJC	3	0	0	0	0
1996	Czech Republic	WCH	1	0	1	1	0
1998	Czech Republic	WC	6	0	2	2	2
1999	Czech Republic	WC	6	1	5	6	14
2002	Czech Republic	OG	4	1	0	1	0
2004	Czech Republic	WCH	3	0	1	1	2
2005	Czech Republic	WC	9	2	1	3	4
Junior totals			21	17	6	23	30
Senior totals			29	4	10	14	22

== See also ==
- List of NHL players with 1,000 games played

Awards and achievements
Preceded by Vadim Sharifijanov	New Jersey Devils first-round draft pick 1995	Succeeded by Lance Ward
