= Brad Bombardir =

Canadian ice hockey player (born 1972)

- Born: May 5, 1972 (age 54) Powell River, British Columbia, Canada
- Height: 6 ft 1 in (185 cm)
- Weight: 205 lb (93 kg; 14 st 9 lb)
- Position: Defence
- Shot: Left
- Played for: New Jersey Devils; Minnesota Wild; Nashville Predators
- National team: Canada
- NHL draft: 56th overall, 1990; New Jersey Devils
- Playing career: 1994–2005

Luke Bradley Bombardir (born May 5, 1972) is a Canadian former professional ice hockey player who played for the New Jersey Devils, Minnesota Wild and the Nashville Predators in the NHL. He currently serves as the Minnesota Wild's Director of Player Development and Senior Director of Community Relations.

== Playing career ==
=== Amateur ===
Growing up in British Columbia, Bombardir played junior hockey with the Powell River Paper Kings in the British Columbia Junior Hockey League from 1988 until 1990. As a result of his play, in which he recorded 10 goals and 25 assists in 60 games, Bombardir was selected in the third round, 56th overall, in the 1990 NHL entry draft by the New Jersey Devils. He did not expect to be drafted and thus showed up at BC Place in a T-shirt and faded jeans instead of a suit and tie. Prior to the draft, Bombardir was expected to enrol at the University of North Dakota but considered playing in the Western Hockey League for the Victoria Cougars.

=== Professional ===
After graduating from the University of North Dakota with a degree in economic development, Bombardir began his professional career with the Albany River Rats in the American Hockey League (AHL). In 1996, his second year with the team, Bombardir was selected for the American Hockey League All-Star team. While entering his third professional season, an NHL lockout happened and Devils assistant coach Larry Robinson spent six weeks training the AHL team. When reflecting on the ordeal, Bombardir said: "I learned more from him in those six weeks than from any other coach." However, Bombardir suffered a broken leg while chasing the puck and missed most of the 1996–1997 season. He returned to the lineup for the 1997–98 season where he made his NHL debut during a 4–1 loss to the Washington Capitals. Coach Jacques Lemaire praised Bombardir after his debut, saying: "He played well. He was in control...We were confident when he was on the ice." On April 15, 1998, Bombardir recorded his first career NHL goal in a 5–4 loss to the Buffalo Sabres.

During the 1999–2000 season, Bombardir made his NHL post-season debut while Scott Niedermayer was suspended. The Devils eventually won the 2000 Stanley Cup Final and he brought the Cup to Powell River. His play during the 2000–01 season earned him a three-year contract extension with the Wild after he posted a career-high 15 assists. As well, although the Wild had been rotating captains each month, Bombardir became the first to serve two consecutive months in January and February. In October 2001, Bombardir fractured his right ankle and was expected to miss two months to recover. The injury occurred during a 3–3 tie with the Edmonton Oilers when he was smashed into the boards by Ethan Moreau. At the time of the injury, Bombardir was playing 25 minutes a game, more than any Wild player. Upon returning to the team's lineup, he recorded his first goal in 104 games during a 5–3 win over the Anaheim Mighty Ducks on February 28, 2002.

Bombardir returned to the Wild for the 2003–04 season where he was again named captain of the team in January. In February, Bombardir and Sergei Zholtok were traded to the Nashville Predators in exchange for a third and fourth-round pick in the 2004 NHL entry draft.

== Post-career ==
In September 2006, Bombardir accepted a full-time position as the director of community partnerships for the Minnesota Wild. Following this, Bombardir was appointed Director of Player Development in 2010.

== Personal life ==
Bombardir and his wife Heather have three children together.

== Career statistics ==
=== Regular season and playoffs ===
			Regular season					Playoffs
Season	Team	League	GP	G	A	Pts	PIM	GP	G	A	Pts	PIM
1988–89	Powell River Paper Kings	BCJHL	30	6	5	11	24	6	0	0	0	0
1989–90	Powell River Paper Kings	BCJHL	60	10	35	45	93	8	2	3	5	4
1990–91	University of North Dakota	WCHA	33	3	6	9	18	—	—	—	—	—
1991–92	University of North Dakota	WCHA	35	3	14	17	54	—	—	—	—	—
1992–93	University of North Dakota	WCHA	38	8	15	23	34	—	—	—	—	—
1993–94	University of North Dakota	WCHA	38	5	17	22	38	—	—	—	—	—
1994–95	Albany River Rats	AHL	77	5	22	27	22	14	0	3	3	6
1995–96	Albany River Rats	AHL	80	6	25	31	63	3	0	1	1	4
1996–97	Albany River Rats	AHL	32	0	8	8	6	16	1	3	4	8
1997–98	Albany River Rats	AHL	5	0	0	0	0	—	—	—	—	—
1997–98	New Jersey Devils	NHL	43	1	5	6	8	—	—	—	—	—
1998–99	New Jersey Devils	NHL	56	1	7	8	16	5	0	0	0	0
1999–2000	New Jersey Devils	NHL	32	3	1	4	6	1	0	0	0	0
2000–01	Minnesota Wild	NHL	70	0	15	15	42	—	—	—	—	—
2001–02	Minnesota Wild	NHL	28	1	2	3	14	—	—	—	—	—
2002–03	Minnesota Wild	NHL	58	1	14	15	16	4	0	0	0	0
2003–04	Minnesota Wild	NHL	56	1	2	3	21	—	—	—	—	—
2003–04	Nashville Predators	NHL	13	0	0	0	4	6	0	1	1	2
2005–06	Springfield Falcons	AHL	1	0	0	0	0	—	—	—	—	—
AHL totals			195	11	55	66	91	33	1	7	8	18
NHL totals			356	8	46	54	127	16	0	1	1	2

=== International ===
Year	Team	Event	Results	GP	G	A	Pts	PIM
1992	Canada	WJC	6th	7	0	3	3	4

== See also ==
- Captain (ice hockey)

Preceded by Wes Walz	Minnesota Wild captain Jan/Feb 2001	Succeeded by Darby Hendrickson
Preceded by Andrew Brunette	Minnesota Wild captain Oct/Nov 2002	Succeeded by Matt Johnson
Preceded by Sergei Zholtok	Minnesota Wild captain Feb-Apr 2003	Succeeded by Brad Brown
Preceded by Richard Park	Minnesota Wild captain January 2004	Succeeded by Jim Dowd
