= Alexander Mogilny =

Russian ice hockey player (born 1969)

- Hockey Hall of Fame, 2025
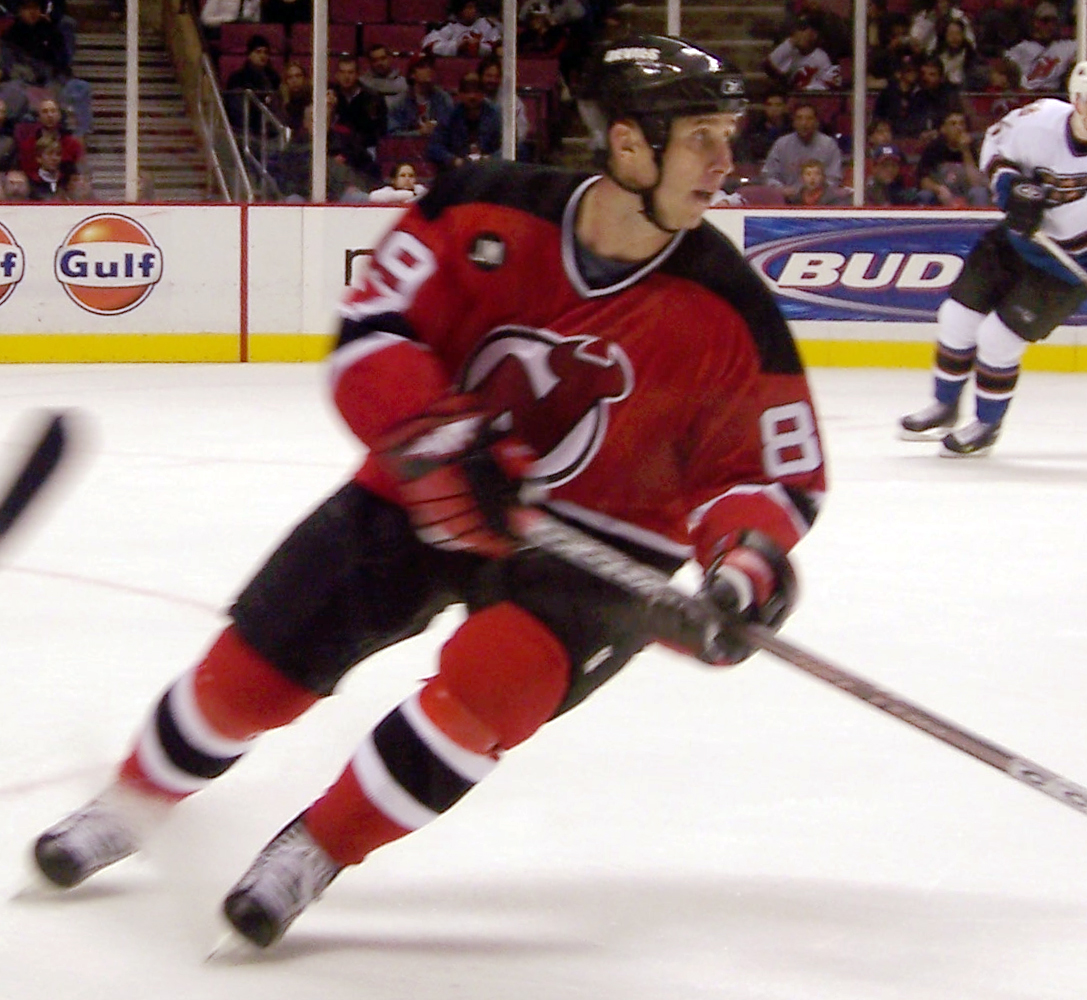
- Mogilny with the New Jersey Devils in 2005
- Born: 18 February 1969 (age 57) Khabarovsk, Russian SFSR, Soviet Union
- Height: 6 ft 0 in (183 cm)
- Weight: 210 lb (95 kg; 15 st 0 lb)
- Position: Right wing
- Shot: Left
- Played for: CSKA Moscow; Buffalo Sabres; Spartak Moscow; Vancouver Canucks; New Jersey Devils; Toronto Maple Leafs
- National team: Soviet Union and Russia
- NHL draft: 89th overall, 1988; Buffalo Sabres
- Playing career: 1986–2006

Alexander Gennadevich Mogilny (Russian: Александр Геннадиевич Могильный; muh-GIL-nee; born 18 February 1969) is a Russian former professional ice hockey player and the current president of Amur Khabarovsk of the Kontinental Hockey League (KHL). Over a 16-season career in the National Hockey League (NHL) from 1989 to 2005, he played for the Buffalo Sabres, Vancouver Canucks, New Jersey Devils, and Toronto Maple Leafs.

Mogilny was selected 89th overall by Buffalo in the 1988 NHL entry draft. In 1989, he became the first NHL draftee to defect from the Soviet Union to pursue a career in North America, marking a pivotal moment in the league's history. During his tenure with the Sabres, he became the first Russian player to serve as an NHL captain and lead the league in goals, scoring 76 in the 1992–93 season. Known for his sublime skating, skill, and sniper's touch, he is one of only seven NHL players to score more than 70 goals in a single season.

Mogilny later won the Stanley Cup with the New Jersey Devils in 2000, joining the Triple Gold Club. A two-time member of the NHL All-Star Team and six-time All-Star, he has surpassed 1,000 career points and earned the Lady Byng Memorial Trophy in 2003 for sportsmanship and excellence. He also shares the NHL record for the fastest goal to start a game.

Internationally, Mogilny represented both the Soviet Union and Russia, winning gold at the 1988 Winter Olympics, 1989 World Championships, and 1989 World Junior Championships. He was named best forward at the 1988 World Juniors after leading the tournament in goals, assists, and points, and later competed for Russia at the 1996 World Cup of Hockey.

Mogilny was inducted into the Hockey Hall of Fame in 2025.

== Playing career ==
=== Early career and defection ===
Born and raised in Khabarovsk, located in the Soviet Union's Far Eastern region, Mogilny was recruited when he was 15 years old to join CSKA Moscow, commonly referred to as the "Red Army Team". As the CSKA organization was a functioning division of the Soviet Army, it was able to draft the best young hockey players in the Soviet Union onto the team.

Mogilny initially joined the junior program of CSKA Moscow. Within two years, he graduated to the senior team, joining the first team in 1986 alongside Sergei Fedorov. Mogilny became a full-time player for CSKA Moscow and finished his first season with 15 goals and 16 points in 28 games. At 17 years old, Mogilny and Sergei Fedorov were the youngest members of the team. Still, team officials anticipated that the duo, along with the imminent arrival of Pavel Bure, would succeed the generational KLM-Line of Vladimir Krutov, Igor Larionov and Sergei Makarov.

Mogilny's first major appearance for the Soviet Union on the international stage was at the 1987 World Junior Championships. He finished the tournament with three goals and two assists in six games. However, his team was ejected from the tournament in its final game following a brawl with Team Canada, an incident later known as the "Punch-up in Piestany". The International Ice Hockey Federation (IIHF) suspended all the players involved in that game from competing in international events for 18 months. The penalty was eventually reduced to six months, allowing Mogilny to compete in the 1988 World Junior Championships. He led the tournament with nine goals and 18 points in seven games, helping his team to a silver medal finish and earning the tournament's best forward award. Later that year, he earned a spot on the senior national team at age 18 for the 1988 Winter Olympics, a rare achievement for such a young player, and won a gold medal with five points in six games. The next year, at the 1989 World Junior Championships, he served as team captain and was a part of the dominant Bure–Fedorov–Mogilny line. Mogilny finished that tournament with seven goals and 12 points in seven games, including a hat-trick against Canada that clinched the gold medal. Bob McKenzie described him as "the world's best junior player, plays on the world's best junior line, on the world's best junior team".

Despite his success with the Soviet national teams and his growing importance on CSKA Moscow, Mogilny longed for a life in the NHL. In May 1989, he chose to join the Buffalo Sabres, the NHL team that had selected him in the 1988 NHL entry draft. At the time, he was widely considered the best player outside the NHL and without political barriers, would have been a contender for the first overall pick. Although the NHL seemed off limits for Mogilny, the Sabres believed he was worth the risk. After winning his first World Championships at the 1989 World Championships, he made history by becoming the first Soviet hockey player to defect to North America.

=== Buffalo Sabres (1989–1995) ===
Mogilny was given the number 89 by team management in recognition of both the year he arrived and his place in the draft. He subsequently wore number 89 for his entire playing career. He made his NHL debut on 5 October 1989, against the Quebec Nordiques during the 1989–90 season and scored his first NHL goal just 20 seconds into his first shift at age 20 (coincidentally, the Sabres were celebrating their 20th season in the NHL). At 20 seconds, he was the third fastest player to score a goal in his NHL debut, the record being 15 seconds. Despite the successful start, he only scored two goals in his first month in the NHL. He had a fear of flying (relating to not being used to flying so much) and needed time to adjust to a new country and culture. He finished his rookie season with 15 goals and 43 points in 65 games and made strides in his sophomore year. Playing in 62 games, he finished with his first point-per-game season as he improved to 30 goals and 64 points. He capped off his first 30-goal season with his first career hat-trick during the last game of the regular season. He continued his ascension the next year scoring 39 goals and 84 points in 67 games. On 21 December 1991, in a game against the Maple Leafs, Mogilny scored five seconds into the game to tie the NHL record for fastest goal scored to start a game. In the 1992 playoffs, he suffered a significant leg injury during the third period of game two against the Boston Bruins, forcing him out for the remainder of the series.

The 1992–93 season was a banner year for Mogilny, as he formed a deadly combination with linemate Pat Lafontaine and Dave Andreychuk and scored an astonishing 76 goals and 127 points in 77 games. His 76 goals tied Finnish rookie Teemu Selänne for the NHL goal-scoring lead that year, which was the fifth-highest season goal total in NHL history and the first time that any player developed outside North America led the NHL in goals. Mogilny's 76 goals and 127 points set the highest season totals ever for a Russian NHL player at the time, and the highest goal totals in Buffalo Sabres franchise history. He scored his 50th goal in his 46th game that year, the fourth-fastest in NHL history, but it did not count as an official 50 goals in 50 games record as it occurred during the team's 53rd game. Mogilny finished the season with seven hat-tricks including three in four games and two four goal games in a stretch where he scored 23 goals in 13 games. By the end of March, he had recorded 74 goals in 70 games and led the NHL in goals for most of the season. He then experienced his longest goalless stretch of the year, going six games without a goal, during which he was surpassed by Selanne. In the final game of the season, Mogilny ended his drought by scoring twice and finished tied with Selanne for the league lead in goals. In the 1993 playoffs, Mogilny played a major role for the Sabres in the division semifinals with six goals in four games. Although he had nine points in 12 career playoff games leading up to that point, he had yet to score his first playoff goal. He went on and scored his first two in a game one win, propelling his team to a four-game sweep of the Boston Bruins in the first round. In the division finals, the Sabres were matched with the Montreal Canadiens. After continuing his playoff goal streak to five games and adding an assist in the series opener, Mogilny broke his leg during a collision in game three and was unable to return for the rest of the series. The Sabres went on to lose the next game and the series in four games. It was the second time in back-to-back years that Mogilny had suffered a significant leg injury. The second leg injury delayed his start to the next season. He finished the 1993–94 season with 79 points in 66 games and made history when he served as the Sabres' captain for a period that year, the first Russian captain in NHL history.

He finished his final season with the Sabres during the lockout-shortened 1994–95 season, leading the team in scoring with 47 points in 44 games, and also led the club in playoff scoring.

=== Vancouver Canucks (1995–2000) ===
Due to financial restraints brought about by the contractual demands of LaFontaine and Dominik Hašek, the Sabres were looking to cut salary and subsequently traded Mogilny, along with a fifth-round draft pick (Todd Norman), to the Vancouver Canucks in exchange for Michael Peca, Mike Wilson and a first-round draft pick ahead of the 1995 NHL entry draft on 8 July 1995. In doing so, the Sabres lowered team salary from about $22 million to around $18–19 million at the time of the trade, although retained a portion of Mogilny's $3.75 million contract.

Vancouver Canucks president Pat Quinn acquired Mogilny with the sole intention of winning the franchise's first Stanley Cup. The team had just been swept in conference semifinals of the 1995 playoffs by the Chicago Blackhawks, and Quinn gave up three important pieces to acquire one of the league's best talents. The motive was to pair Mogilny with Pavel Bure and form a dominant scoring line, as the two had played together at CSKA Moscow and had an established chemistry off the ice. Bure however, missed almost their entire first season together with a torn ACL, so Mogilny played primarily with Cliff Ronning and Martin Gélinas. He led the team with 55 goals, 107 points, and finished third in the league in goals. Mogilny followed that with nine points in six games in his first playoff series for Vancouver but the Canucks were ousted in the conference quarterfinals by the Stanley Cup champions that year, the Colorado Avalanche.

It was with Vancouver where he started to develop into a consistent offensive threat on the penalty kill, as he finished near the top of the league in shorthanded production for multiple seasons. He later wryly remarked "You don't have to be a genius to kill penalties. You get the puck and hammer it down the ice. How tough can that be?" Mogilny led the Canucks in scoring again his second year with 73 points, but it marked the end of his success in Vancouver. In the subsequent years, assorted injuries and inconsistency dropped his production to 128 points in 157 games over the next three seasons and the Canucks missed the playoffs each year. He was also unable to find the expected on-ice success with Bure as both players preferred to play on their off-wing. After trading Bure to the Florida Panthers in January 1999, the Canucks traded Mogilny to the New Jersey Devils at the trade deadline in 2000 in exchange for Brendan Morrison and Denis Pederson.

=== New Jersey Devils (2000–2001) ===
Although he did not produce at the expected level, he came through in the Eastern Conference finals against the Philadelphia Flyers. With the Devils trailing the series 3–2, Mogilny scored the late game-winning goal in game six to force a game seven. The goal proved crucial, as the Flyers scored shortly afterward, but the Devils held on for a 2–1 win. In the deciding game seven, he also assisted on Patrik Eliáš' late game-winning goal. In the Stanley Cup Final, the Devils would prevail over the Dallas Stars to win the Stanley Cup. With the win, Mogilny captured his first Stanley Cup and became a member of the Triple Gold Club. "The reason we got Alex Mogilny at that time was what he could bring offensively with the shot he had. He could do that almost individually at given times but still be a team player," Devils General Manager Lou Lamoriello said of the acquisition.

The next year, Mogilny stayed mainly injury-free for the first time in three years and led the Devils with 43 goals and finished with 83 points. The Devils went back to the Stanley Cup Final for a second consecutive season, but failed to repeat as champions and lost to the Colorado Avalanche in seven games.

=== Toronto Maple Leafs (2001–2004) ===
During the free agency period of 2001, multiple teams expressed interest in Mogilny as the Devils could not meet his market value. On 3 July 2001, he signed a four-year, $22 million contract with the Toronto Maple Leafs. This was a reunion for Mogilny and Quinn, as the latter was Toronto's General Manager who signed him, and had also acquired him during his time with Vancouver. Mogilny scored two goals in his Maple Leafs debut, and scored his 400th career NHL goal a few games later, in a 6–1 win over the Mighty Ducks of Anaheim. He missed 16 games that season due to back injuries and finished his first year with the team third in scoring, playing primarily on a line with Gary Roberts and Robert Reichel. Mogilny followed that season by playing a key role in the team's playoff run, leading the Maple Leafs in playoff goals and scoring two goals in each of the game seven victories against the New York Islanders and Ottawa Senators. Toronto however, was eliminated by the Carolina Hurricanes in the Eastern Conference Finals.

In the following season, head coach Pat Quinn paired Mogilny and team captain Mats Sundin on the Maple Leafs’ first line. Darcy Tucker was initially the third forward on the line, but was soon replaced by Nik Antropov after Tucker struggled to find consistency with the duo. Sundin, when asked about his long wait for an equally talented winger, said "Alex is as talented or as good as any other player I've played with. And I've played with Joe Sakic, Peter Forsberg, all those guys. There's no complaints there for sure." Mogilny upon hearing Sundin's answer, quipped "I'm very honoured, but apparently he did not play with a lot of good players." Mogilny and Sundin each finished the season with 70 or more points and played together in all situations. Mogilny led the team with 79 points, three shorthanded goals (tied with Sundin), nine game-winning goals, and recorded two hat-tricks that year. It was the only season in which Sundin did not lead the Maple Leafs in regular-season scoring. The duo faced the Philadelphia Flyers in the first round, where Mogilny scored his first career playoff hat-trick in a game one victory and once again led the team in playoff goals, but the Leafs were eliminated in six games. He was awarded the Lady Byng Memorial Trophy at season's end for pairing sportsmanship and an outstanding level of performance.

In the following season, Mogilny spent most of the year sidelined due to major hip surgery. He returned late in the season where he recorded his 1,000th career NHL point against the Buffalo Sabres. Entering the game, he had 998 career points; he earned his 999th point by assisting on a first-period goal, but his team found themselves down 5–2 entering in the third period. After Owen Nolan scored twice to cut the deficit to one, Mogilny set up Gary Roberts' tying goal with less than a minute remaining to record his 1,000th career NHL point. The Leafs then completed their comeback when Mogilny set up Tomáš Kaberle for the overtime winner. Despite high expectations for the team to compete for the Stanley Cup, with many future Hockey Hall of Fame players on the roster, Toronto did not find much playoff success. The Maple Leafs defeated the Ottawa Senators in the first round in a hard-fought seven-game series, but were eliminated by a physical Philadelphia Flyers team in the conference semifinals. Mogilny's fourth season with the club was cancelled due to the lockout and he became a free agent in 2005, as the Leafs were unable to afford Mogilny under the new salary cap. Despite playing only three seasons with the Maple Leafs, Mogilny was ranked no. 83 on the franchise's list of the 100 greatest players.

=== Return to New Jersey (2005–2006) ===
During the lockout-cancelled 2004–05 season, Mogilny underwent his second hip surgery in seven months. On 16 August 2005, Mogilny returned to New Jersey Devils after agreeing to a two-year, US$7 million contract. Although he scored 25 points in his first 29 games, he went pointless the next six games as his chronic hip problem left him unable to perform at his previous levels. He agreed to play for the Albany River Rats, the Devils' then-American Hockey League (AHL) affiliate, midway through the 2005–06 season, for salary cap reasons. Mogilny finished the year after playing 19 games for the River Rats, but could not gain medical clearance to return to the NHL for the 2006–07 season. He was placed on long-term injury reserve during training camp and retired from professional hockey at the end of the season.

=== Post-playing career ===
Following his retirement from professional hockey, Mogilny returned to Russia and began consulting for his hometown team, Amur Khabarovsk, in the Kontinental Hockey League (KHL). Admiral Vladivostok of the KHL hired him as its president in 2013. After two seasons with that club, he returned to Khabarovsk to become its president and has held that title since 2016.

== International play ==
Medal record

Men's ice hockey

Representing the Soviet Union

Winter Olympics
| Gold medal – first place | 1988 Calgary | |

World Championship
| Gold medal – first place | 1989 Sweden | |

World Junior Championships
| Gold medal – first place | 1989 United States | |
| Silver medal – second place | 1988 Soviet Union | |

At the 1988 Winter Olympics, Mogilny made his senior debut with the Soviet national team as an 18-year-old in Canada and finished with five points in six games. He played with the full-roster Soviet Union team that won the gold medal. In the 1996 World Cup of Hockey, Russia had played five preliminary games in order to set the groupings for the main tournament stage. Russia was the only team that went undefeated (winning against Finland (Moscow), Germany (Landshut), Sweden (Stockholm), the United States (Detroit) and tied against Canada (Calgary)). The United States, Sweden and Finland games saw the pairing line of "Bure-Fedorov-Mogilny" for the first and only time internationally at the senior level, and was considered "perhaps the best forward line on earth" at the time. “Imagine if they had stayed together,” said Buffalo center Pat LaFontaine, whose partnership with Mogilny helped him finish second in league scoring in 1993. “It probably would have been one of the greatest lines in history. But having them here in the NHL makes for more of an exciting league." Mogilny and Fedorov played on the same line and both led the team in scoring, but they lost in the semifinals against the United States after defeating Finland 5–0 in the quarterfinals.

== Player profile ==
Alex, I think, was the strongest. He has the most agility, the quickest release and the best shot...the leader of our line

— Sergei Fedorov, who played on a line with Mogilny and Pavel Bure internationally.

Mats Sundin once called Mogilny the "best player [he's] ever played with." The two were teammates during Mogilny's tenure with the Maple Leafs. Sundin described Mogilny as 'gifted, skilled, a natural hockey player, and the best pure goal-scorer he's ever seen.' Pat Lafontaine described Mogilny as the 'best player [he's] seen and played with.' "I've been lucky to play with some great players in my career, but I put Alex as the best player that I had a chance to see and play with talent-wise," LaFontaine said of his teammate. "He was the rare combination of the speed, the skill and finesse, quickness. He was just the full package." Lafontaine and Mogilny were linemates during the 1992–93 season, when Mogilny scored 76 goals and Lafontaine had 148 points that year. Lafontaine described that year as follows: "There was a sixth sense. We just had an idea of where each other was going to be on the ice. One thing about Alex, he thinks the game at such a high level. His hockey sense and to be able to have the hands and the feet and the speed, he's that rare combination of everything."

Sergei Fedorov praised him, saying, "Alex was faster than all of us, [Pavel] Bure and Fedorov, and Alex was a machine. He was built like a machine." "Plus on top of all the crazy skill he had, he's better than all of us. He's amazing." Fedorov said all three players were known for their speed, but Mogilny, in his opinion, was the fastest player of them all. "If you went back and forth five times, (Mogilny) will be first," Fedorov said. "I will be third." Igor Larionov, who played with him briefly when Mogilny was a rookie with the Central Army team, was quickly impressed by the young Russian from Khabarovsk. When asked about Mogilny, Larionov said, "He was such a talented guy. Really good with the stick, and smart. He was a natural."

Pat Quinn called him "The most talented player that he's ever coached." Mogilny was characterized by Quinn as 'having good size and wonderful skating ability, he can play any kind of game.' Lou Lamoriello once said of Mogilny, "If there was any one player capable of breaking a game open at any given time, he certainly is that. His skating is exceptional. His shot is exceptional." "I don't know if there was any better pure goal scorer than Alex Mogilny".

== Legacy ==
Mogilny was the first Russian to be an NHL captain, first Russian named to the NHL All-Star team, and holds the highest single-season goal total and third highest single-season point total for a Russian NHL player. At the time of his retirement, he was the highest Russian goal-scorer and the second-highest Russian scorer in NHL history. Mogilny was the second Russian player to reach 1,000 points in the NHL, hitting the milestone just a few days after Sergei Fedorov. As of the end of the 2024–25 NHL season, Mogilny is the fourth-highest Russian scorer in the history of the NHL. His 1992–93 tie with Teemu Selänne of Finland made them the first non-North Americans ever to lead the NHL in goals scored.

In 2016, he was inducted into the Greater Buffalo Sports Hall of Fame. Despite having comparable statistics to inductees such as Daniel Alfredsson and Paul Kariya, and being a trailblazer for Russian participation in the NHL, Mogilny had been denied entry into the Hockey Hall of Fame for many years. He was finally elected in 2025, 16 years after he became eligible.

== Career statistics ==
=== Regular season and playoffs ===
Bold indicates led league

| | | | Regular season | | | | | Playoffs |
| Season | Team | League | GP | G | A | Pts | PIM | GP | G | A | Pts | PIM |
|---|---|---|---|---|---|---|---|---|---|---|---|---|
| 1986–87 | CSKA Moscow | USSR | 28 | 15 | 1 | 16 | 4 | — | — | — | — | — |
| 1987–88 | CSKA Moscow | USSR | 39 | 12 | 8 | 20 | 14 | — | — | — | — | — |
| 1988–89 | CSKA Moscow | USSR | 31 | 11 | 11 | 22 | 24 | — | — | — | — | — |
| 1989–90 | Buffalo Sabres | NHL | 65 | 15 | 28 | 43 | 16 | 4 | 0 | 1 | 1 | 2 |
| 1990–91 | Buffalo Sabres | NHL | 62 | 30 | 34 | 64 | 16 | 6 | 0 | 6 | 6 | 2 |
| 1991–92 | Buffalo Sabres | NHL | 67 | 39 | 45 | 84 | 73 | 2 | 0 | 2 | 2 | 0 |
| 1992–93 | Buffalo Sabres | NHL | 77 | **76** | 51 | 127 | 40 | 7 | 7 | 3 | 10 | 6 |
| 1993–94 | Buffalo Sabres | NHL | 66 | 32 | 47 | 79 | 22 | 7 | 4 | 2 | 6 | 6 |
| 1994–95 | Spartak Moscow | IHL | 1 | 0 | 1 | 1 | 0 | — | — | — | — | — |
| 1994–95 | Buffalo Sabres | NHL | 44 | 19 | 28 | 47 | 36 | 5 | 3 | 2 | 5 | 2 |
| 1995–96 | Vancouver Canucks | NHL | 79 | 55 | 52 | 107 | 16 | 6 | 1 | 8 | 9 | 8 |
| 1996–97 | Vancouver Canucks | NHL | 76 | 31 | 42 | 73 | 18 | — | — | — | — | — |
| 1997–98 | Vancouver Canucks | NHL | 51 | 18 | 27 | 45 | 36 | — | — | — | — | — |
| 1998–99 | Vancouver Canucks | NHL | 59 | 14 | 31 | 45 | 58 | — | — | — | — | — |
| 1999–00 | Vancouver Canucks | NHL | 47 | 21 | 17 | 38 | 16 | — | — | — | — | — |
| 1999–00 | New Jersey Devils | NHL | 12 | 3 | 3 | 6 | 4 | 23 | 4 | 3 | 7 | 4 |
| 2000–01 | New Jersey Devils | NHL | 75 | 43 | 40 | 83 | 43 | 25 | 5 | 11 | 16 | 8 |
| 2001–02 | Toronto Maple Leafs | NHL | 66 | 24 | 33 | 57 | 8 | 20 | 8 | 3 | 11 | 8 |
| 2002–03 | Toronto Maple Leafs | NHL | 73 | 33 | 46 | 79 | 12 | 6 | 5 | 2 | 7 | 4 |
| 2003–04 | Toronto Maple Leafs | NHL | 37 | 8 | 22 | 30 | 12 | 13 | 2 | 4 | 6 | 8 |
| 2005–06 | New Jersey Devils | NHL | 34 | 12 | 13 | 25 | 6 | — | — | — | — | — |
| 2005–06 | Albany River Rats | AHL | 19 | 4 | 10 | 14 | 17 | — | — | — | — | — |
| NHL totals | | | 990 | 473 | 559 | 1,032 | 432 | 124 | 39 | 47 | 86 | 58 |

=== International ===
| Year | Team | Event | GP | G | A | Pts | PIM |
|---|---|---|---|---|---|---|---|
| 1986 | Soviet Union | EJC | 5 | 4 | 1 | 5 | 4 |
| 1987 | Soviet Union | WJC | 6 | 3 | 2 | 5 | 4 |
| 1988 | Soviet Union | WJC | 7 | 8 | 10 | 18 | 2 |
| 1988 | Soviet Union | OLY | 6 | 3 | 2 | 5 | 2 |
| 1989 | Soviet Union | WJC | 7 | 7 | 5 | 12 | 4 |
| 1989 | Soviet Union | WC | 10 | 0 | 3 | 3 | 2 |
| 1996 | Russia | WCH | 5 | 2 | 4 | 6 | 0 |
| Junior totals | | | 25 | 22 | 18 | 40 | 14 |
| Senior totals | | | 21 | 5 | 9 | 14 | 4 |

== Awards and achievements ==
- NHL All-Star – 1992, 1993, 1994, 1996, 2001, 2003 (injured)
- NHL second All-Star team – 1993, 1996
- Stanley Cup champion – 2000
- Goal-scoring leader (tied with Teemu Selänne) – 1993 (76)
- Lady Byng Memorial Trophy – 2003
- Most game-winning goals in a season – 1993 (11)
- Buffalo Sabres Hall of Fame (inducted on 1 January 2011)
- World Junior Championships All-Star team – 1988
- World Junior Championships best forward – 1988
- Member of the Triple Gold Club (10 June 2000)
- Inducted into the Greater Buffalo Sports Hall of Fame in 2016
- Third fastest goal scored in an NHL debut

== See also ==
- List of NHL players with 1,000 points
- List of NHL players with 100 point seasons
- List of Eastern Bloc defectors

| Preceded by Pat LaFontaine | Buffalo Sabres captain 1993–94 | Succeeded by Pat LaFontaine |
| Preceded by Brett Hull | NHL goal leader 1993 (tied with Teemu Selänne) | Succeeded by Pavel Bure |
| Preceded by Ron Francis | Winner of the Lady Byng Trophy; 2003 | Succeeded by Brad Richards |
