= Arlette Roxburgh =

American singer and songwriter

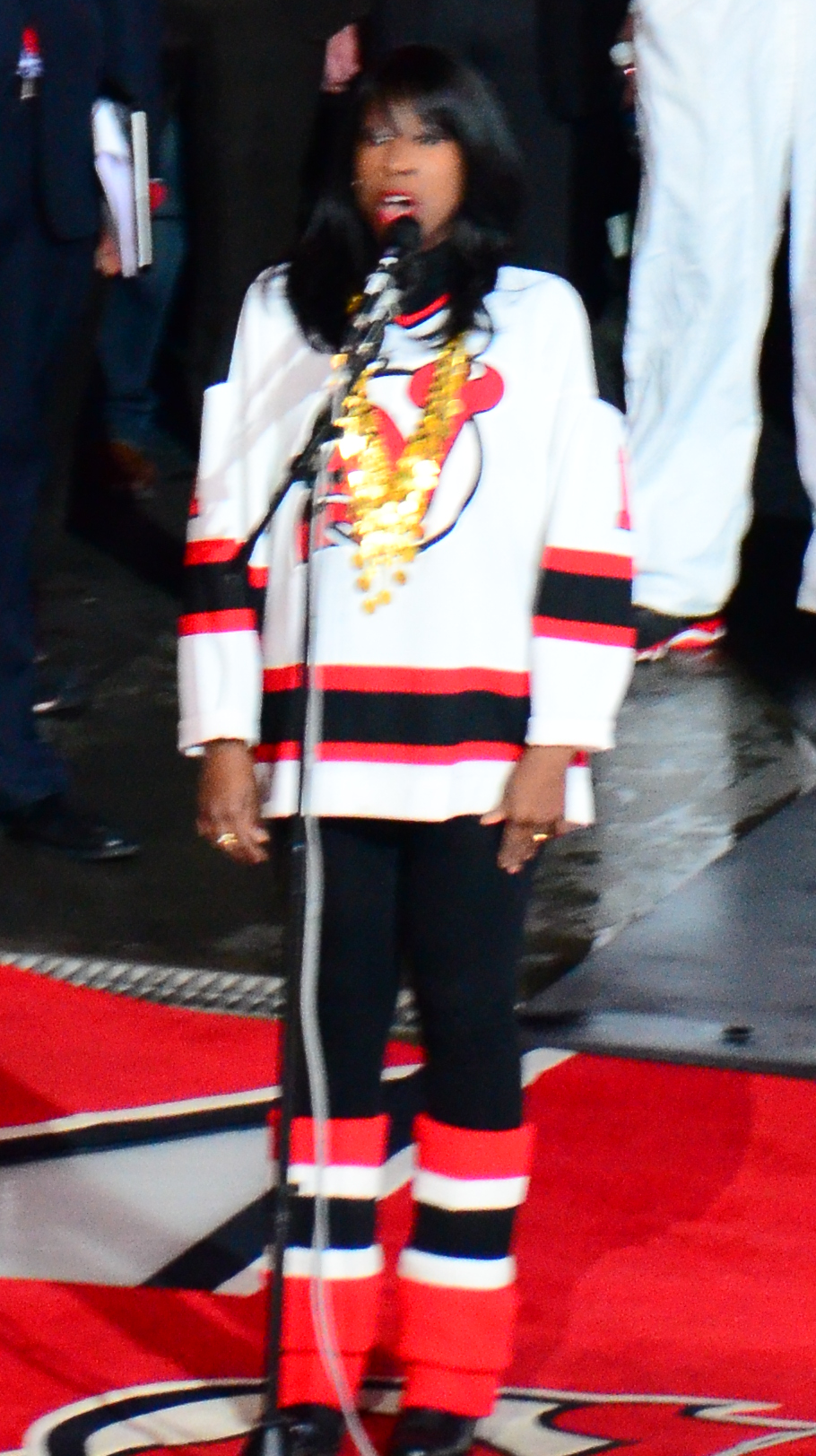
- Roxburgh at a New Jersey Devils game in 2013
- Born: Trinidad
- Occupations: Singer; songwriter
- Years active: 1996–present

Arlette Roxburgh is a Trinidadian American singer and songwriter. She was born in Trinidad. She is best known as the national anthem singer for New Jersey Devils home games. She also served as the anthem singer for New Jersey Nets games until their relocation to Brooklyn.

== Early life and education ==
Roxburgh was born on the island of Trinidad. As a child, she sang in the church choir and continued until she was a teenager. After this, she formed a singing group of her own and performed at talent shows and social events. Roxburgh attended Long Island University and obtained a bachelor's degree in chemistry. Other than her studies, she still believed that music was very important to her. In fact, while in college, she was in a wedding band as the lead singer. Some time later, she met an Italian man named Luigi Scapino from Rome, Italy. In 1995, they performed together as a duo. One year later, following her graduation, Roxburgh and Luigi got married. At that point, she was fully devoted to music.

== Musical career ==
=== New Jersey Devils and New Jersey Nets ===
In 1996, then New Jersey Devils GM Lou Lamoriello met Roxburgh on the streets of New York City on 2nd Avenue. He noticed that she was singing in a restaurant and watched for a while. Lamoriello was very impressed by her musical talent, so he asked Roxburgh if she could perform The Star-Spangled Banner before the Devils home games. She quickly accepted the offer and sang at a few games in the late 1990s. She did not become the Devils regular anthem singer until the 2000s. Sometimes Arlette calls Lamoriello "Uncle Lou". She is considered to be the Devils "official anthem singer". Also, when the Nets were in New Jersey at the former Continental Airlines Arena, Arlette sang the anthem during their home games as well. She has two children, a boy and girl.

=== Other works ===
- Arlette performed NY1's theme song called, "New York One" in 2009.
- Currently Roxburgh and her husband are working on an Italian Music Project and are showcasing different Italian songs such as 'O sole mio and Tarantella.
- Performed at the September 11th memorial dedication ceremony at Eagle Rock Reservation in West Orange, New Jersey on October 20, 2002.

== Discography ==
- America: Stronger Than Ever (2002)
- Save Me (Single) (2014)
