= Randy McKay =

Canadian ice hockey player (born 1967)

- Born: January 25, 1967 (age 59) Montreal, Quebec, Canada
- Height: 6 ft 2 in (188 cm)
- Weight: 210 lb (95 kg; 15 st 0 lb)
- Position: Right wing
- Shot: Right
- Played for: Detroit Red Wings; New Jersey Devils; Dallas Stars; Montreal Canadiens
- NHL draft: 113th overall, 1985; Detroit Red Wings
- Playing career: 1988–2003

Hugh Randall McKay (born January 25, 1967) is a Canadian former professional hockey player. Playing the right wing position, he played in the National Hockey League (NHL) from 1988 to 2003 with the Detroit Red Wings, New Jersey Devils, Dallas Stars and Montreal Canadiens. He was commonly referred to as Randy "The Rocket" Mckay" for not only his physical playstyle and consistent double digit goal seasons, but also most notably for his "head high screamers" or hard slapshots into the upper corner of the net.

== Playing career ==
McKay was selected by the Detroit Red Wings in the sixth round, 113th overall, of the 1985 NHL entry draft. He split the 1987–88, 1988–89 and 1989–90 seasons between the Red Wings and their affiliate in the American Hockey League (AHL), the Adirondack Red Wings. McKay stuck with the Wings in the NHL for the 1990–91 season, appearing in 47 games. While showing a scoring touch in the AHL, McKay only scored 4 goals in 83 total games with the Red Wings and was unable to find consistent playing time. Following the season, McKay and Dave Barr were sent by rule of an arbitrator to the New Jersey Devils as compensation for the Red Wings' signing of free agent Troy Crowder. The deal did not work out for the Wings as Crowder only played in seven games for the team before incurring a serious injury. McKay developed into a solid third and fourth line player that the Wings would later covet in the latter part of the decade. It was a move that Red Wings senior vice president Jim Devellano resisted at the time and regretted later.

Although a physical presence on the ice, McKay also contributed offensively, with double-digit goal totals and a positive plus/minus most seasons (including +30 in 1997–98, fourth in the NHL). He is perhaps best remembered among Devils fans for scoring the winning goal in game six of the 1995 Eastern Conference Final against the Philadelphia Flyers; the Devils won the game 4–2 and went on to win their first Stanley Cup by upsetting the heavily-favoured Detroit Red Wings in four games.

On October 28, 2000, in a regular season game against the Pittsburgh Penguins, McKay and teammate John Madden each scored four goals in a 9–0 win for the Devils. It was the first time since 1922 that two teammates each scored four goals.

McKay was also a member of the Devils when they won the Stanley Cup in 2000 against the Dallas Stars in six games.

On March 19, 2002, McKay was traded (alongside Jason Arnott and a first-round pick in the 2002 NHL entry draft) to the Dallas Stars in exchange for Joe Nieuwendyk and Jamie Langenbrunner.

McKay retired after the 2002–03 season, finishing his career in his hometown as a member of the Montreal Canadiens.

== Crash line ==
For a period of time with the New Jersey Devils, McKay was a member of "The Crash Line" alongside Bobby Holík and Mike Peluso. Head coach Jacques Lemaire created the line to counter the larger skilled players of the Eastern Conference at the time, including Eric Lindros, Cam Neely and Jaromír Jágr. The average weight of the linemates was 215 pounds, and each skater played a physical and aggressive style of hockey. The trio were part of the Devils Stanley Cup championship in 1995. Following the departure of Peluso, Holík and McKay often remained on the same line, which sometimes included Sergei Brylin.

== Other ==
McKay is a graduate of Michigan Technological University (1984–1988).

McKay splits time between Houghton, Michigan and Marquette, Michigan with his wife, Amy. He has four children: Riley, Kaitlyn, Dawson and McKenna.

== Career statistics ==
			Regular season					Playoffs
Season	Team	League	GP	G	A	Pts	PIM	GP	G	A	Pts	PIM
1983–84	Lac St-Louis Lions	QMAAA	38	18	28	46	62	11	6	10	16	8
1984–85	Michigan Tech University	WCHA	25	4	5	9	32	—	—	—	—	—
1985–86	Michigan Tech University	WCHA	40	12	22	34	46	—	—	—	—	—
1986–87	Michigan Tech University	WCHA	39	5	11	16	46	—	—	—	—	—
1987–88	Michigan Tech University	WCHA	41	17	24	41	70	—	—	—	—	—
1987–88	Adirondack Red Wings	AHL	10	0	3	3	12	6	0	4	4	0
1988–89	Detroit Red Wings	NHL	3	0	0	0	0	2	0	0	0	2
1988–89	Adirondack Red Wings	AHL	58	29	34	63	170	14	4	7	11	60
1989–90	Detroit Red Wings	NHL	33	3	6	9	51	—	—	—	—	—
1989–90	Adirondack Red Wings	AHL	36	16	23	39	99	6	3	0	3	35
1990–91	Detroit Red Wings	NHL	47	1	7	8	183	5	0	1	1	41
1991–92	New Jersey Devils	NHL	80	17	16	33	246	7	1	3	4	10
1992–93	New Jersey Devils	NHL	73	11	11	22	206	5	0	0	0	16
1993–94	New Jersey Devils	NHL	78	12	15	27	244	20	1	2	3	24
1994–95	New Jersey Devils	NHL	33	5	7	12	44	19	8	4	12	11
1995–96	New Jersey Devils	NHL	76	11	10	21	145	—	—	—	—	—
1996–97	New Jersey Devils	NHL	77	9	18	27	109	10	1	1	2	0
1997–98	New Jersey Devils	NHL	74	24	24	48	86	6	0	1	1	0
1998–99	New Jersey Devils	NHL	70	17	20	37	143	7	3	2	5	2
1999–2000	New Jersey Devils	NHL	67	16	23	39	80	23	0	6	6	9
2000–01	New Jersey Devils	NHL	77	23	20	43	50	19	6	3	9	8
2001–02	New Jersey Devils	NHL	55	6	7	13	65	—	—	—	—	—
2001–02	Dallas Stars	NHL	14	1	4	5	7	—	—	—	—	—
2002–03	Montreal Canadiens	NHL	75	6	13	19	72	—	—	—	—	—
NHL totals			932	162	201	363	1731	123	20	23	43	123
