= Bobby Holík =

Czech ice hockey player (born 1971)

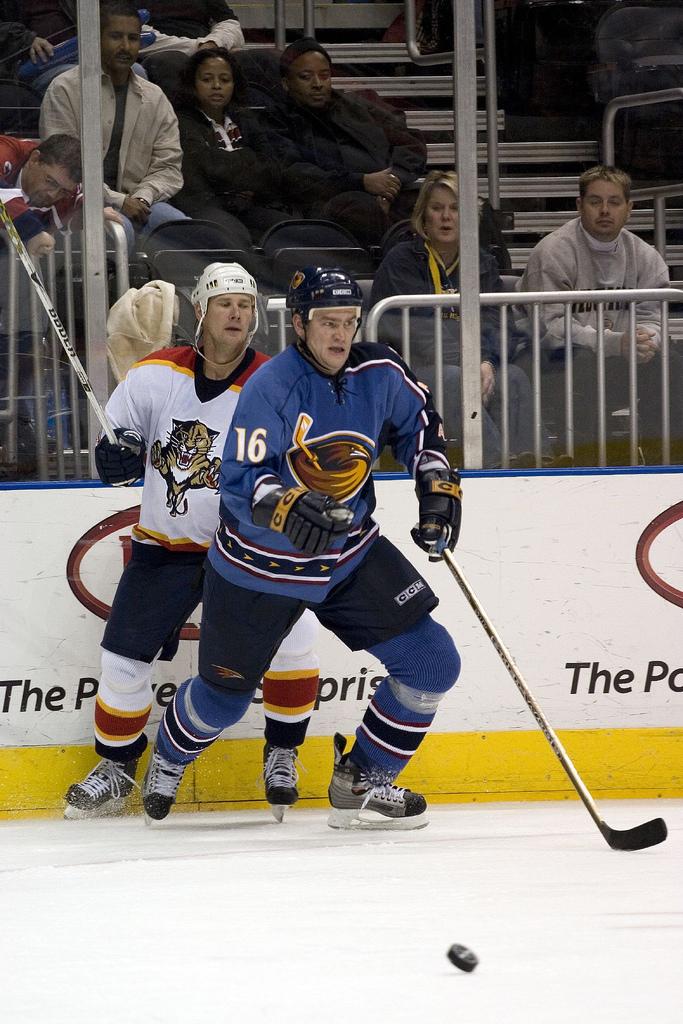
- Holík with the Atlanta Thrashers in 2005
- Born: January 1, 1971 (age 55) Jihlava, Czechoslovakia
- Height: 6 ft 4 in (193 cm)
- Weight: 240 lb (109 kg; 17 st 2 lb)
- Position: Center
- Shot: Right
- Played for: Dukla Jihlava; Hartford Whalers; New Jersey Devils; New York Rangers; Atlanta Thrashers
- National team: Czechoslovakia and Czech Republic
- NHL draft: 10th overall, 1989; Hartford Whalers
- Playing career: 1987–2009
Medal record
Representing Czechoslovakia
ice hockey
World Championships
Bronze medal – third place	1990 Switzerland
World Junior Championships
Bronze medal – third place	1989 United States
Bronze medal – third place	1990 Finland
European Junior Championships
Gold medal – first place	1988 Czechoslovakia
Silver medal – second place	1989 Soviet Union

Robert Holík (born January 1, 1971) is a Czech-American former professional ice hockey center who played 18 seasons in the National Hockey League (NHL). Holík is the son of Jaroslav Holík, a Czechoslovak ice hockey world champion in 1972 and Czech national team head coach who led the under-20 team to world titles in 2000 and 2001. Holík was the head coach of the Israel men's national ice hockey team from 2019 to 2021.

== Playing career ==
Holík began his NHL career playing for the Hartford Whalers in 1990 after being selected tenth overall by them in the 1989 NHL entry draft. After two seasons with the Whalers, he was traded to the New Jersey Devils where he played for ten seasons, featuring as a member of the "Crash Line" alongside Mike Peluso and Randy McKay, and winning two Stanley Cup championships, in 1995 and 2000. Prior to the 2002–03 season, as a free agent, Holík signed a five-year, $45 million contract with the New York Rangers.

In 2005, following the 2004–05 NHL lockout, the Rangers bought out the remainder of Holík's contract, after which he signed with the Atlanta Thrashers. On October 2, 2007, he was named captain of the Thrashers for the 2007–08 season.

On July 1, 2008, as a free agent, Holík signed a one-year contract with the New Jersey Devils for the 2008–09 season, returning to the team he played ten seasons with.

On May 23, 2009, following the conclusion of the 2008–09 season, Holík announced his retirement from the NHL. He was 38 when he retired and cited a focus to be with his family. Since 2017, Holík has run a hockey school in Israel and coached their U-18 and U-20 programs.

== Personal life ==
Holík became an American citizen in a ceremony in Newark, New Jersey, on November 4, 1996. He is married with a daughter, Hannah Marie Holík, born in 1997, and splits his time between Wyoming and Florida.

Holík's nephew, David Musil, was drafted by the Edmonton Oilers.

Holík is an avid rifle, pistol and shotgun enthusiast. After being introduced to firearms manufacturer CZ-USA's president Alice Poluchová by shooting instructor Shepard Humphries, Holík became CZ-USA's celebrity representative.

== Awards and achievements ==
- Stanley Cup champion – 1995, 2000
- NHL All-Star – 1998, 1999

== Career statistics ==
=== Regular season and playoffs ===
			Regular season					Playoffs
Season	Team	League	GP	G	A	Pts	PIM	GP	G	A	Pts	PIM
1987–88	ASD Dukla Jihlava	CSSR	31	7	11	18	16	—	—	—	—	—
1988–89	ASD Dukla Jihlava	CSSR	24	7	10	17	32	12	3	5	8	—
1989–90	ASD Dukla Jihlava	CSSR	42	15	26	41	—	—	—	—	—	—
1990–91	Hartford Whalers	NHL	78	21	22	43	113	6	0	0	0	7
1991–92	Hartford Whalers	NHL	76	21	24	45	44	7	0	1	1	6
1992–93	New Jersey Devils	NHL	61	20	19	39	76	5	1	1	2	6
1992–93	Utica Devils	AHL	1	0	0	0	2	—	—	—	—	—
1993–94	New Jersey Devils	NHL	70	13	20	33	72	20	0	3	3	6
1994–95	New Jersey Devils	NHL	48	10	10	20	18	20	4	4	8	22
1995–96	New Jersey Devils	NHL	63	13	17	30	58	—	—	—	—	—
1996–97	New Jersey Devils	NHL	82	23	39	62	54	10	2	3	5	4
1997–98	New Jersey Devils	NHL	82	29	36	65	100	5	0	0	0	8
1998–99	New Jersey Devils	NHL	78	27	37	64	119	7	0	7	7	6
1999–2000	New Jersey Devils	NHL	79	23	23	46	106	23	3	7	10	14
2000–01	New Jersey Devils	NHL	80	15	35	50	97	25	6	10	16	37
2001–02	New Jersey Devils	NHL	81	25	29	54	97	6	4	1	5	2
2002–03	New York Rangers	NHL	64	16	19	35	52	—	—	—	—	—
2003–04	New York Rangers	NHL	82	25	31	56	96	—	—	—	—	—
2005–06	Atlanta Thrashers	NHL	64	15	18	33	79	—	—	—	—	—
2006–07	Atlanta Thrashers	NHL	82	11	18	29	86	4	0	1	1	0
2007–08	Atlanta Thrashers	NHL	82	15	19	34	90	—	—	—	—	—
2008–09	New Jersey Devils	NHL	62	4	5	9	66	3	0	1	1	2
CSSR totals			97	29	47	76	48	12	3	5	8	—
NHL totals			1,314	326	421	747	1,421	141	20	39	59	120

=== International ===
Year	Team	Event	GP	G	A	Pts	PIM
1988	Czechoslovakia	EJC	6	5	2	7	2
1989	Czechoslovakia	WJC	7	5	3	8	2
1989	Czechoslovakia	EJC	6	3	11	14	2
1990	Czechoslovakia	WJC	7	6	5	11	12
1990	Czechoslovakia	WC	10	1	5	6	0
1991	Czechoslovakia	WC	10	3	3	6	18
1996	Czech Republic	WCH	3	0	0	0	0
Junior totals			26	19	21	40	18
Senior totals			23	4	8	12	18

== See also ==
- List of NHL players with 1,000 games played

Preceded by Chris Govedaris	Hartford Whalers first-round draft pick 1989	Succeeded by Mark Greig
Preceded by Scott Mellanby	Atlanta Thrashers captain 2007–08	Succeeded by Ilya Kovalchuk
