= 1995 Stanley Cup Final =

1995 ice hockey championship series

	1	2	3	4	Total
New Jersey Devils	2	4	5	5	4
Detroit Red Wings	1	2	2	2	0
- Location(s): East Rutherford: Brendan Byrne Arena (3, 4); Detroit: Joe Louis Arena (1, 2)
- Coaches: New Jersey: Jacques Lemaire; Detroit: Scotty Bowman
- Captains: New Jersey: Scott Stevens; Detroit: Steve Yzerman
- National anthems: New Jersey: Unknown; Detroit: Karen Newman
- Referees: Bill McCreary (1, 4); Terry Gregson (2); Kerry Fraser (3)
- Dates: June 17–24, 1995
- MVP: Claude Lemieux (Devils)
- Series-winning goal: Neal Broten (7:56, second)
- Hall of Famers: Devils: Martin Brodeur (2018); Scott Niedermayer (2013); Scott Stevens (2007); Red Wings: Dino Ciccarelli (2010); Paul Coffey (2004); Sergei Fedorov (2015); Viacheslav Fetisov (2001); Mark Howe (2011); Nicklas Lidström (2015); Mike Vernon (2023); Steve Yzerman (2009); Coaches: Scotty Bowman (1991); Jacques Lemaire (1984, player); Officials: Bill McCreary (2014); Ray Scapinello (2008)
- Networks: Canada: (English): CBC (French): SRC; United States: (English): Fox (1, 4), ESPN (2–3)
- Announcers: (CBC) Bob Cole and Harry Neale (SRC) Claude Quenneville and Gilles Tremblay (Fox) Mike Emrick and John Davidson (ESPN) Gary Thorne and Bill Clement

The 1995 Stanley Cup Final was the championship series of the National Hockey League's (NHL) 1994–95 season, and the culmination of the 1995 Stanley Cup playoffs. It was contested by the Eastern Conference champion New Jersey Devils and the Western Conference champion Detroit Red Wings. It was the Devils franchise's first appearance in the Final, while the Red Wings returned to the Final for the first time since 1966. The Devils upset the heavily-favored Red Wings in a sweep to win their first Stanley Cup championship in franchise history in their 21st season. The Devils became the sixth team to earn a championship after joining the league in 1967 or later. This was the first of nine consecutive Final series to feature only American-based franchises. This also marked the first of four consecutive sweeps in the Final series. This was also the first time since 1988 that a Presidents' Trophy-winning team was swept in a playoff series.

This was also the first time in both the NHL and NBA history where both finals involved the first-seeded team being swept. In addition, the Devils became the first team in NHL history to win the title without having home ice advantage in any of the four playoff rounds since the playoffs was expanded to a 16-team format in 1980. Coincidentally, this feat would also be achieved in the NBA by the Houston Rockets that same year, when they won the NBA championship over the Orlando Magic.

Despite the fact that the regular season was cut short by the owners' lockout, both the season and the Final were saved at the eleventh hour – this was the latest date that the Stanley Cup was awarded. This record was later matched in 2013 and then broken by the COVID-19 pandemic affected the 2019–20 season. The fifth seeded Devils held the record as the lowest seeded team to win the Stanley Cup until the Los Angeles Kings broke the record in 2012. Their regular season winning percentage was also the lowest for a Cup winner since the 1966–67 Toronto Maple Leafs.

This was the first Cup Final since 1980 to be played entirely within one time zone.

== Paths to the Final ==
=== New Jersey Devils ===
The Devils entered the playoffs as the 5th seed in the Eastern Conference. In the first round, they defeated the fourth-seeded Boston Bruins in five games. In the second round, they defeated the third-seeded Pittsburgh Penguins, also in five games. In the East Final, the Devils upset their rival in the top-seeded Philadelphia Flyers in six games to reach their first Stanley Cup Final in franchise history.

=== Detroit Red Wings ===
The Red Wings were the Presidents' Trophy winner and therefore was the overall #1 seed in the playoffs. In the first round, the Red Wings handled the eighth-seeded Dallas Stars in five games. In the second round, the Red Wings got revenge on the seventh-seeded San Jose Sharks in a sweep after being upset by them in the first round of last year's playoffs, to return to the Western Conference Final for the first time since 1988. In the West Final, the Red Wings faced their fellow rival in the Chicago Blackhawks and defeated them in five games to return to the Stanley Cup Final for the first time since 1966.

== Game summaries ==
=== Game one ===
June 17	New Jersey Devils	2–1	Detroit Red Wings	Joe Louis Arena	Recap

The series opened on June 17, at the Joe Louis Arena in Detroit. Few gave New Jersey much of a chance against the NHL's best team. Going into the game, Detroit was a perfect 8–0 at home in the playoffs and had outscored their opponents 30–11 in their eight home games. In the first three rounds alone the Red Wings had scored 18 power-play goals. Detroit fans, first greeting their opponents with a chorus of boos, then chanted after every Devils name was read during introductions, "Who cares?"

After a scoreless first period, the underdog Devils got on the board first, when Stéphane Richer blasted a slap shot from the top of the right circle that just squeezed through Detroit goaltender Mike Vernon. The power-play goal came at 9:41 of the second period and gave New Jersey a 1–0 lead. The Red Wings responded less than four minutes later and tied the game on a power-play goal by Dino Ciccarelli at 13:08. The Devils would regain the lead on a goal by Claude Lemieux, a slapper from the slot at 3:17 of the third period. New Jersey would go on to win the game 2–1 and take a one-game-to-none series lead. They played a solid defensive game, frustrating the Red Wings and holding them to just 17 shots. The win was their ninth road win of the playoffs.

Scoring summary
Period	Team	Goal	Assist(s)	Time	Score
1st	None				
2nd	NJ	Stéphane Richer (5) – pp	Tommy Albelin (6) and Neal Broten (10)	09:41	1–0 NJ
2nd	DET	Dino Ciccarelli (9) – pp	Nicklas Lidström (11) and Paul Coffey (12)	13:08	1–1
3rd	NJ	Claude Lemieux (12)	John MacLean (10) and Tom Chorske (4)	03:17	2–1 NJ
Penalty summary
Period	Team	Player	Penalty	Time	PIM
1st	NJ	Bill Guerin	Holding	06:47	2:00
1st	DET	Vladimir Konstantinov	Holding the stick	11:05	2:00
2nd	DET	Kris Draper	Roughing	09:35	2:00
2nd	NJ	Bobby Holík	High-sticking	11:37	2:00
2nd	NJ	Claude Lemieux	Hooking	13:41	2:00
2nd	DET	Dino Ciccarelli	Roughing	15:54	2:00
2nd	NJ	Ken Daneyko	Roughing	15:54	2:00
3rd	DET	Doug Brown	Tripping	04:48	2:00

Shots by period
Team	1	2	3	Total
New Jersey	9	10	9	28
Detroit	7	5	15	17

=== Game two ===
June 20	New Jersey Devils	4–2	Detroit Red Wings	Joe Louis Arena	Recap

In game two, Detroit played with a sense of urgency. Vyacheslav Kozlov scored on the power play at 7:17 of the second period to make the score 1–0 in favor of the Red Wings. Devils forward John MacLean would tie the game at 1–1 less than two and a half minutes later with a goal at 9:40. Then, on a Detroit breakaway, New Jersey defenceman and captain Scott Stevens laid a thundering body check on Kozlov as he made a move to the inside past the New Jersey blue line. Although the Red Wings regained the lead on Sergei Fedorov's goal at 1:36 of the third period, the Stevens hit seemed to inspire the Devils. With the midway point of the third period approaching, New Jersey defenceman Scott Niedermayer picked up the puck in his own zone and skated up the ice. Once over the Detroit blue line, he got a step on Detroit defenceman Paul Coffey and fired a shot towards the Detroit net. Although the puck missed the net, it bounced off the end boards and came right back to Niedermayer, who shot it past Mike Vernon to tie the game at 2–2. The game remained tied until late in the third period. Devils defenceman Shawn Chambers fired a shot from the point and the rebound came right to Jim Dowd who backhanded the puck into the net to give the Devils a 3–2 lead. Stéphane Richer would add an empty-net goal as New Jersey won, 4–2.

Scoring summary
Period	Team	Goal	Assist(s)	Time	Score
1st	None				
2nd	DET	Vyacheslav Kozlov (9) – pp	Dino Ciccarelli (2) and Sergei Fedorov (16)	07:17	1–0 DET
2nd	NJ	John MacLean (5)	Scott Niedermayer (5) and Neal Broten (11)	09:40	1–1
3rd	DET	Sergei Fedorov (5)	Doug Brown (6) and Viacheslav Fetisov (6)	01:36	2–1 DET
3rd	NJ	Scott Niedermayer (4)	Jim Dowd (1)	09:47	2–2
3rd	NJ	Jim Dowd (2)	Shawn Chambers (5) and Tommy Albelin (7)	18:36	3–2 NJ
3rd	NJ	Stéphane Richer (6) – en	Scott Niedermayer (6)	19:39	4–2 NJ
Penalty summary
Period	Team	Player	Penalty	Time	PIM
1st	NJ	Scott Stevens	Roughing	00:37	2:00
1st	DET	Dino Ciccarelli	Slashing	05:57	2:00
1st	DET	Darren McCarty	Roughing	08:49	2:00
1st	NJ	Neal Broten	High-sticking	09:27	2:00
2nd	NJ	Martin Brodeur	Delay of game	06:56	2:00
2nd	DET	Darren McCarty	Slashing	08:58	2:00
2nd	NJ	Bill Guerin	Slashing	08:58	2:00
2nd	DET	Bob Errey	Charging	16:01	2:00
2nd	NJ	Jim Dowd	Interference	18:30	2:00
3rd	NJ	Bobby Holík	Boarding	04:58	2:00

Shots by period
Team	1	2	3	Total
New Jersey	3	9	11	23
Detroit	7	6	5	18

=== Game three ===
June 22	Detroit Red Wings	2–5	New Jersey Devils	Brendan Byrne Arena	Recap

Game 3 was first NHL game ever played after the official summer solstice and also the first Stanley Cup Final game played in the state of New Jersey. During the first game, the Detroit crowd taunted the Devils by collectively jeering "Who cares?" after each player was introduced. The Devils fans countered by raining boos down on the visiting Red Wings and delivering chants of "Red Wings suck." The Devils did their talking on the ice, dominating the Red Wings, scoring five consecutive goals. Bruce Driver, Claude Lemieux, Neal Broten, Randy McKay and Bobby Holík all scored to give the Devils a 5–0 lead with 11:46 remaining in the game. Detroit scored twice on power-play goals by Sergei Fedorov and Steve Yzerman at 16:57 and 18:27 of the third period, but it was insufficient to keep New Jersey from winning a 5–2 game. They now had a commanding three-games-to-none lead in the series.

Scoring summary
Period	Team	Goal	Assist(s)	Time	Score
1st	NJ	Bruce Driver (1) – pp	Neal Broten (12) and John MacLean (11)	10:30	1–0 NJ
1st	NJ	Claude Lemieux (13)	Bobby Carpenter (4) and Scott Stevens (6)	16:52	2–0 NJ
2nd	NJ	Neal Broten (5)	Scott Stevens (7) and John MacLean (12)	06:59	3–0 NJ
2nd	NJD	Randy McKay (8)	Bobby Holík (4) and Bruce Driver (5)	08:20	4–0 NJ
3rd	NJD	Bobby Holík (4) – pp	Bill Guerin (5) and Stéphane Richer (14)	08:14	5–0 NJ
3rd	DET	Sergei Fedorov (6) – pp	Viacheslav Fetisov (7) and Doug Brown (7)	16:57	5–1 NJ
3rd	DET	Steve Yzerman (4) – pp	Ray Sheppard (3) and Nicklas Lidström (12)	18:27	5–2 NJ
Penalty summary
Period	Team	Player	Penalty	Time	PIM
1st	DET	Keith Primeau	Slashing	01:09	2:00
1st	NJ	Claude Lemieux	Roughing	01:09	2:00
1st	DET	Vladimir Konstantinov	Slashing	08:56	2:00
1st	NJ	Bobby Holík	Tripping	10:58	2:00
1st	DET	Martin Lapointe	Unsportsmanlike conduct	16:38	2:00
1st	NJ	Bill Guerin	Unsportsmanlike conduct	16:38	2:00
2nd	NJ	Neal Broten	Holding the stick	11:01	2:00
2nd	DET	Keith Primeau	Tripping	16:03	2:00
2nd	NJ	Bobby Carpenter	Cross-checking	19:47	2:00
3rd	NJ	Tommy Albelin	High-sticking	02:30	2:00
3rd	DET	Vladimir Konstantinov	High-sticking	04:25	2:00
3rd	DET	Kris Draper	High-sticking	05:17	2:00
3rd	DET	Keith Primeau	Cross-checking	06:31	2:00
3rd	NJ	Bobby Holík	Interference	08:44	2:00
3rd	NJ	Stephane Richer	Hooking	12:28	2:00
3rd	DET	Dino Ciccarelli	Roughing	15:37	2:00
3rd	DET	Tim Taylor	Roughing	15:37	2:00
3rd	DET	Martin Lapointe	Roughing – double minor	15:37	4:00
3rd	NJ	Bill Guerin	Boarding	15:37	2:00
3rd	NJ	Bill Guerin	Roughing	15:37	2:00
3rd	NJ	Valeri Zelepukin	Roughing – double minor	15:37	4:00
3rd	NJ	Sergei Brylin	High-sticking	15:37	2:00
3rd	NJ	Sergei Brylin	Roughing	15:37	2:00

Shots by period
Team	1	2	3	Total
Detroit	7	5	12	24
New Jersey	15	8	8	31

=== Game four ===
June 24	Detroit Red Wings	2–5	New Jersey Devils	Brendan Byrne Arena	Recap

The Devils jumped out to a 1–0 lead on Neal Broten's goal just 68 seconds into the game. However, the Red Wings were fighting to stay alive and tied the game on Sergei Fedorov's goal just 55 seconds later. Coffey scored a shorthanded goal at 13:01 to give Detroit a 2–1 lead. New Jersey responded less than five minutes later, at 17:45 on a slap-shot goal by Shawn Chambers that beat Mike Vernon glove-side. Then, in the second period, Scott Niedermayer passed to Broten, who chipped the puck over Vernon's glove from just in front of the net. The goal, Broten's second of the game, gave the Devils a 3–2 lead. New Jersey would increase its lead with goals by Sergei Brylin and Chambers (his second of the game) at 7:46 and 12:32 of the third period. The Devils won the game 5–2 and the series four games to none. It was New Jersey's first Stanley Cup championship in team history. Devils goaltender Martin Brodeur allowed just seven goals against the Red Wings in the series and Devils forward Claude Lemieux was awarded the Conn Smythe Trophy as playoff MVP, having led all skaters in playoff goals with 13. He would win the Stanley Cup again the very next season with the Colorado Avalanche.

Scoring summary
Period	Team	Goal	Assist(s)	Time	Score
1st	NJ	Neal Broten (6)	Stéphane Richer (15) and Tom Chorske (5)	01:08	1–0 NJ
1st	DET	Sergei Fedorov (7)	Martin Lapointe (1) and Viacheslav Fetisov (8)	02:03	1–1
1st	DET	Paul Coffey (6) – sh	Doug Brown (8) and Sergei Fedorov (17)	13:01	2–1 DET
1st	NJ	Shawn Chambers (3)	Bruce Driver (6) and John MacLean (13)	17:45	2–2
2nd	NJ	Neal Broten (7)	Scott Niedermayer (7) and Bill Guerin (6)	07:56	3–2 NJ
3rd	NJ	Sergei Brylin (1)	Brian Rolston (1) and Bill Guerin (7)	07:46	4–2 NJ
3rd	NJ	Shawn Chambers (4)	Sergei Brylin (2) and Bill Guerin (8)	12:32	5–2 NJ
Penalty summary
Period	Team	Player	Penalty	Time	PIM
1st	DET	Bob Errey	Hooking	11:03	2:00
1st	NJ	Ken Daneyko	Roughing	13:36	2:00
1st	DET	Keith Primeau	Goaltender interference	15:35	2:00
2nd	NJ	Ken Daneyko	Slashing	00:30	2:00
2nd	DET	Martin Lapointe	Roughing	10:09	2:00
2nd	NJ	Scott Stevens	Roughing	10:09	2:00
2nd	NJ	Bill Guerin	Interference	12:43	2:00
2nd	DET	Vladimir Konstantinov	Hooking	19:12	2:00
3rd	DET	Stu Grimson	Roughing	10:24	2:00

Shots by period
Team	1	2	3	Total
Detroit	8	7	1	16
New Jersey	8	8	10	26

== Broadcasting ==
This was the first year that coverage of the Cup Final in the United States was split between Fox and ESPN. Fox broadcast games one and four with Mike Emrick (who was the Devils' local television announcer during the season) and John Davidson, while ESPN broadcast games two and three with Gary Thorne and Bill Clement. This was also the first Cup Final in which the U.S. national networks had exclusive rights, and no longer could any of the regional rights holders of the participating U.S. teams produce local telecasts of their respective games. Game four, the first Stanley Cup-clinching game to air on network television in the United States since game six in 1980, drew a 4.7 rating and a 10 share. In the New York City area, the game drew a 10.6 rating and 21 share and in Detroit, 14.1 and 26.

In Canada, Bob Cole and Harry Neale were in the broadcast booth for CBC.

On the radio side, the series was broadcast continentally on NHL Radio with Kenny Albert and Gary Green announcing. Devils team broadcasters Mike Miller and Sherry Ross called the series on local radio on WABC–AM 770 in New York City and Red Wings team broadcasters Bruce Martyn and Paul Woods called the series on local radio on WJR–AM 760 in Detroit.

== Team rosters ==
=== Detroit Red Wings ===
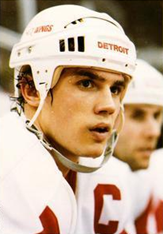
Steve Yzerman (pictured in 1987) captained the Red Wings to their first Stanley Cup Final in 29 years.

#	Nat	Player	Position	Hand	Acquired	Place of birth	Finals appearance
17	(United States)	Doug Brown	RW	R	1994–95	Southborough, Massachusetts	first
11	(Canada)	Shawn Burr	LW	L	1984	Sarnia, Ontario	first
22	(Canada)	Dino Ciccarelli	RW	R	1992–93	Sarnia, Ontario	second (1981)
77	(Canada)	Paul Coffey – A	D	L	1992–93	Weston, Ontario	sixth (1983, 1984, 1985, 1987, 1991)
33	(Canada)	Kris Draper	C	L	1993–94	Toronto, Ontario	first
21	(Canada)	Bob Errey	LW	L	1994–95	Montreal, Quebec	third (1991, 1992)
91	(Russia)	Sergei Fedorov – A	C	L	1989	Pskov, Soviet Union	first
44	(Russia)	Viacheslav Fetisov	D	L	1994–95	Moscow, Soviet Union	first
4	(United States)	Mark Howe	D	L	1992–93	Detroit, Michigan	third (1985, 1987)
23	(Canada)	Greg Johnson	C	L	1993–94	Thunder Bay, Ontario	first (did not play)
16	(Russia)	Vladimir Konstantinov	D	R	1989	Murmansk, Soviet Union	first
13	(Russia)	Vyacheslav Kozlov	LW	L	1990	Voskresensk, Soviet Union	first
18	(Canada)	Mike Krushelnyski	LW	L	1994–95	Montreal, Quebec	fourth (1985, 1987, 1988)
20	(Canada)	Martin Lapointe	RW	R	1991	Ville St. Pierre, Quebec	first
5	(Sweden)	Nicklas Lidström	D	L	1989	Krylbo, Sweden	first
25	(Canada)	Darren McCarty	RW	R	1992	Burnaby, British Columbia	first
30	(Canada)	Chris Osgood	G	L	1991	Peace River, Alberta	first
55	(Canada)	Keith Primeau	C	L	1990	Toronto, Ontario	first
15	(United States)	Mike Ramsey	D	L	1994–95	Minneapolis, Minnesota	first
3	(Canada)	Bob Rouse	D	R	1994–95	Surrey, British Columbia	first
26	(Canada)	Ray Sheppard	RW	R	1991–92	Pembroke, Ontario	first
37	(Canada)	Tim Taylor	C	L	1993–94	Stratford, Ontario	first
29	(Canada)	Mike Vernon	G	L	1994–95	Calgary, Alberta	third (1986, 1989)
19	(Canada)	Steve Yzerman – C	C	R	1983	Cranbrook, British Columbia	first

=== New Jersey Devils ===
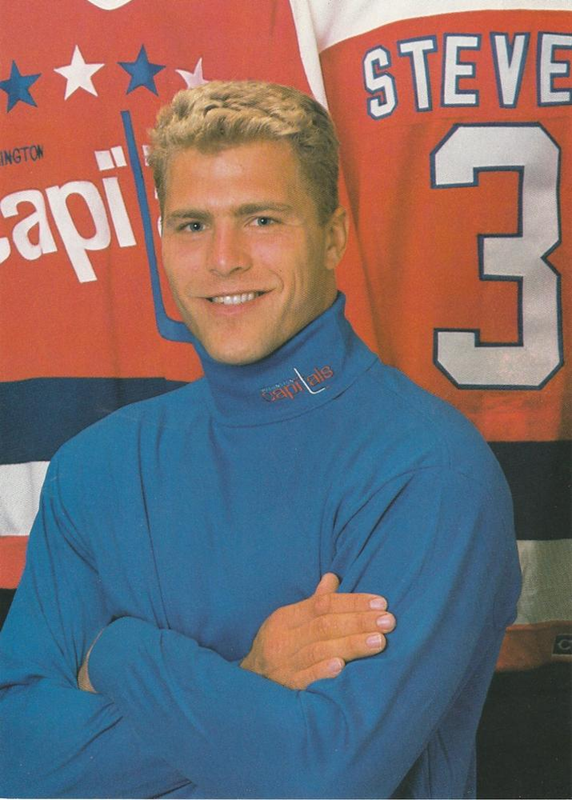
Scott Stevens (pictured in 1989) captained the Devils to their first Stanley Cup Final appearance in franchise history.

#	Nat	Player	Position	Hand	Acquired	Place of birth	Finals appearance
6	(Sweden)	Tommy Albelin	D	L	1988–89	Stockholm, Sweden	first
30	(Canada)	Martin Brodeur	G	L	1990	Montreal, Quebec	first
9	(United States)	Neal Broten	C	L	1994–95	Roseau, Minnesota	third (1981, 1991)
18	(Russia)	Sergei Brylin	LW/C	L	1992	Moscow, Soviet Union	first
19	(United States)	Bobby Carpenter	C	L	1993–94	Beverly, Massachusetts	first
29	(United States)	Shawn Chambers	D	L	1994–95	Royal Oak, Michigan	second (1991)
17	(United States)	Tom Chorske	LW	R	1991–92	Minneapolis, Minnesota	first
20	(United States)	Danton Cole	RW	R	1994–95	Pontiac, Michigan	first (did not play)
3	(Canada)	Ken Daneyko	D	L	1982	Windsor, Ontario	first
28	(United States)	Kevin Dean	D	L	1987	Madison, Wisconsin	first (did not play)
11	(United States)	Jim Dowd	C	R	1987	Brick, New Jersey	first
23	(Canada)	Bruce Driver – A	D	L	1981	Etobicoke, Ontario	first
12	(United States)	Bill Guerin	RW	R	1989	Worcester, Massachusetts	first
16	(Czech Republic)	Bobby Holík	C	R	1992–93	Jihlava, Czechoslovakia	first
22	(Canada)	Claude Lemieux	RW	R	1990–91	Buckingham, Quebec	third (1986, 1989)
15	(Canada)	John MacLean – A	RW	R	1983	Oshawa, Ontario	first
7	(United States)	Chris McAlpine	D	R	1990	Roseville, Minnesota	first (did not play)
21	(Canada)	Randy McKay	RW	R	1991–92	Montreal, Quebec	first
27	(Canada)	Scott Niedermayer	D	L	1991	Edmonton, Alberta	first
8	(United States)	Mike Peluso	LW	L	1993–94	Pengilly, Minnesota	second (1992)
44	(Canada)	Stéphane Richer	RW	R	1991–92	Ripon, Quebec	third (1986, 1989)
14	(United States)	Brian Rolston	C	L	1991	Flint, Michigan	first
4	(Canada)	Scott Stevens – C	D	L	1991–92	Kitchener, Ontario	first
31	(United States)	Chris Terreri	G	L	1983	Providence, Rhode Island	first
25	(Russia)	Valeri Zelepukin	LW	L	1990	Voskresensk, Soviet Union	first

== Stanley Cup engraving ==
The 1995 Stanley Cup was presented to Devils captain Scott Stevens by NHL Commissioner Gary Bettman following the Devils 5–2 win over the Red Wings in game four

The following Devils players and staff had their names engraved on the Stanley Cup

1994–95 New Jersey Devils

=== Players ===
Centres

- 9 Neal Broten
- 11 Jim Dowd
- 14 Brian Rolston
- 16 Bobby Holík
- 19 Bob Carpenter

Wingers

- 8 Mike Peluso
- 12 Bill Guerin
- 15 John MacLean (A)
- 17 Tom Chorske
- 18 Sergei Brylin*
- 20 Danton Cole ‡
- 21 Randy McKay*
- 22 Claude Lemieux
- 25 Valeri Zelepukin
- 44 Stéphane Richer

Defencemen

- 3 Ken Daneyko
- 4 Scott Stevens (Captain)
- 6 Tommy Albelin
- 7 Chris McAlpine †
- 23 Bruce Driver (A)
- 27 Scott Niedermayer
- 28 Kevin Dean ‡
- 29 Shawn Chambers

Goaltenders

- 30 Martin Brodeur
- 31 Chris Terreri
- * Played both centre and wing.
- † Did not play or dress in the Final.
- ‡ Exemption granted to engrave the name of a player who did not automatically qualify.

=== Coaching and administrative staff ===
- John J. McMullen (owner/chairman/governor), Peter McMullen (vice president)
- Lou Lamoriello (president/general manager), Jacques Lemaire (head coach), Jacques Caron (goaltender coach)
- Dennis Gendron (assistant oach), Larry Robinson (assistant oach), Robbie Ftorek (AHL coach)
- Alex Abasto (assistant equipment manager), Bob Huddleston (massage therapist), Dave Nichols (equipment manager)
- Ted Schuch (medical trainer), Mike Vasalani (strength-conditioning coach), David Conte (director of scouting), Milt Fisher (scout)
- Claude Carrie (scout), Dan Labraaten (scout), Marcel Pronovost (scout)

=== Engraving notes ===
- No. 7 Chris McAlpine (D) played in 24 regular-season games and none in the playoffs. Due to the 1994–95 NHL lockout, he played in half of the regular-season games, automatically qualifying to have his name engraved on the Stanley Cup.
- No. 28 Kevin Dean (D) played in 17 regular-season games and 3 playoff games. No. 20 Danton Cole (RW) played in 12 regular-season games and 1 playoff game. As they did not automatically qualify (24 regular season games or 1 Final game for the shortened season), New Jersey successfully requested an exemption to engrave their names.
- Eight members were engraved with an initial and two full names. Stéphane Richer was engraved as Stephane J. J. Richer, because there was another Stéphane J. G. Richer, who was playing in the NHL. Stéphane J. G. Richer played 27 NHL games over four years from 1992–93 to 1994–95.
- Starting in 1994–95, every team that has won the Stanley Cup has left off non-playing positions except for 1 year (see 2007 Stanley Cup Final)

== See also ==
- 1994–95 NHL season
- 1994–95 Detroit Red Wings season
- 1994–95 New Jersey Devils season
- 1995 Stanley Cup playoffs
- List of Stanley Cup champions

Preceded by New York Rangers; 1994	New Jersey Devils; Stanley Cup champions 1995	Succeeded by Colorado Avalanche; 1996
