= Bobby Carpenter (ice hockey) =

American ice hockey player (born 1963)

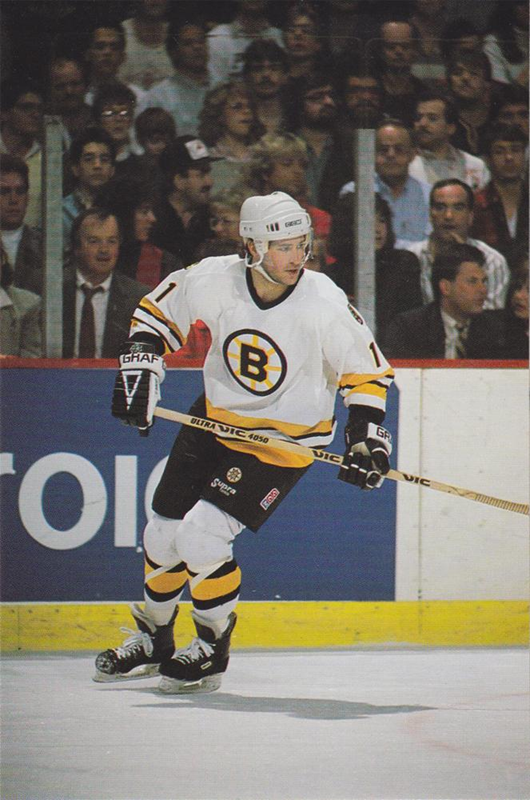
- Born: July 13, 1963 (age 63) Beverly, Massachusetts, U.S.
- Height: 6 ft 0 in (183 cm)
- Weight: 200 lb (91 kg; 14 st 4 lb)
- Position: Center
- Shot: Left
- Played for: Washington Capitals; New York Rangers; Los Angeles Kings; Boston Bruins; New Jersey Devils
- National team: United States
- NHL draft: 3rd overall, 1981; Washington Capitals
- Playing career: 1981–1999

Robert E. Carpenter Jr. (born July 13, 1963) is an American former professional ice hockey center and professional ice hockey coach. He played in National Hockey League (NHL) for 18 seasons from 1981 to 1999. He was selected in the first round of the 1981 draft by the Washington Capitals, becoming the second American-born player to be selected in the first round and the first since Mike Ramsey. Labeled the "Can't Miss Kid" by Sports Illustrated, Carpenter immediately made the major league roster, never spending a day in the minor leagues; he was the first player to play in the NHL directly from high school after being drafted. He recorded 30-goal seasons in each of his first two years with Washington before peaking with 53 goals in the 1984–85 season; he was the first American-born player to score 50 goals in a season. Carpenter was traded twice in the 1986–87 season, which saw him play for the New York Rangers and Los Angeles Kings.

He played with the Kings until being traded late into the 1989 season to the Boston Bruins, where he reached the Stanley Cup Final in 1990, which saw him record four goals and six assists. He suffered a career-threatening injury in the 1990–91 season that saw him have to recover from a shattered kneecap and cartilage damage. He returned in the 1991–92 season and focused on checking to the tune of 48 points in 60 games. He signed as a free agent for Washington in 1992 and New Jersey in 1993, with the latter seeing him play his final six seasons as a player, where he was now being utilized for his defensive skills that saw him play in the Stanley Cup Final again in 1995, which he won for his first and only Stanley Cup victory as a player. He retired at the conclusion of the 1998–99 season with over 300 goals and 400 assists in 1,178 games.

After his playing days ended, Carpenter served as an assistant coach with the Devils, which saw him win Stanley Cups in 2000 and 2003. He served as head coach of Kunlun Red Star of the Kontinental Hockey League from 2017 to 2018.

== Early life ==
Carpenter was born on July 13, 1963, in Beverly, Massachusetts as the second of three children, each of whom also competed in sports. He grew up in the city of Peabody. His father (a police officer) introduced Carpenter to hockey at an early age by taking him to Boston Bruins games and he later built a rink in the backyard for Carpenter to practice on.

Carpenter attended St. John's Preparatory School, which saw him play for the school's hockey team in all four years. In his sophomore season, he led them to the 1979 Massachusetts State Championship, doing so with 54 points on 23 goals and 31 assists in 23 games. His junior year saw him collect 65 points in 33 games on the way to being named the Massachusetts High School Player of the Year.

His senior year saw him play in just 18 games, but he recorded 47 points while being named the Massachusetts High School Player of the Year for the second straight year. He would finish his time at St. John’s with 166 points, the most in school history. In 1986, he was inducted into the St. John’s Prep Athletics Hall of Fame as part of the second class of inductees.

Carpenter was selected to the 1981 U.S. National Junior Team. He recorded nine points (five goals and four assists) in five games and was named the team’s most valuable player. After his stint with the world junior team, Carpenter faced a decision, as he signed a letter of intent with Providence College and was also selected by the Washington Capitals in the 1981 NHL entry draft in June 1981, much to the surprise of his family, as the Capitals made a trade with Colorado to select third in the draft ahead of Hartford, who had been courting Carpenter.

== Professional career ==
=== Washington Capitals (1981–1986) ===
In the February 23, 1981 issue of Sports Illustrated, Carpenter was featured in a cover story that labeled him the "Can’t-Miss Kid" and the greatest high school hockey player in history as well as chronicled his potential. During his first season with the Capitals, He would make his NHL debut on October 7, 1981 against the Buffalo Sabres, where he tallied a goal and an assist. He would end up playing all 80 games in his rookie year, finishing with 32 goals and 67 total points, with both being franchise rookie records that were not broken until the 2005–06 season.

Carpenter would be a staple of the Capitals for the next couple of seasons. He would continue to produce solid numbers for the next two seasons, having a 69-point season in the 1982–83 season and a 68-point season the following year. Carpenter made the cut for the American team for the 1984 Canada Cup, which played in September that saw America lose to Sweden in the semifinal round.

In the 1984–85 season, his fourth as a player, Carpenter had a banner year. Paired up with Mike Gartner by head coach Bryan Murray, both players reaped rewards with 50-goal seasons, with Carpenter recording 42 assists. On March 21, 1985, Carpenter became the first American-born player with 50 goals in a season, doing so at the Montreal Forum in a 3–2 loss to the Montreal Canadiens. He was selected to his first NHL All-Star Game that season. He received votes for the Byng Trophy (finishing 16th) and Hart Trophy (12th).

The following year saw him limited to 27 goals with 29 assists with a career high in penalty minutes with 105. He played the first 22 games of the 1986–87 season prior to be traded, which saw him play 422 consecutive games for the team.

=== New York and Los Angeles (1986–1989) ===
Quoted as being hard on himself while facing criticism for his lack of aggression to go along with clashes with Murray, Carpenter told Capitals management that they might be better off without him on the team. In January 1987, he was traded to the New York Rangers alongside a draft pick for Bob Crawford, Mike Ridley and Kelly Miller.

He would only play 28 games for the Rangers when later in the season, he would be dealt again, to the Los Angeles Kings in the trade that sent Marcel Dionne to the Rangers; in total, he played 60 games and recorded 27 total points with a career-worst plus-minus of –26. He would finish the 1986–87 season with the United States team at the 1987 Ice Hockey World Championship tournament in Moscow after the Kings were eliminated in the first round of the 1987 Stanley Cup playoffs. Carpenter played for the American team one more time in the 1987 Canada Cup. Carpenter would go on to play a full season with the Kings during the 1987–88 season. He played in 71 games and recorded 19 goals and 33 assists. The following season saw him appear in 39 games for the Kings, where he had 11 goals and 15 assists prior to being traded.

=== Boston Bruins (1989–1992) ===
On January 23, 1989, Carpenter was traded to the Boston Bruins for Jay Miller. Nursing a thumb injury, he had 40 total points in 57 games for the two teams. In his first full season with the team in the 1989–90 season, he served as a key player (with 25 goals and 31 assists) for the team as they won the Presidents' Trophy with the best record in the NHL. He played in all 21 games of the playoff run, scoring four goals with six assists as the Bruins lost in the Stanley Cup Final to the Edmonton Oilers.

During the 1990–91, he suffered what was thought to be a career-ending injury. In the December 8 game in Montreal versus the Canadiens, his skates went out from under him when trying to cut behind the Montreal goal that saw him fall on his left side when slamming into the boards that resulted in his kneecap shattering into six pieces along with cartilage damage. He underwent a four-hour surgery to repair the kneecap at Massachusetts General Hospital. He would end up making a miraculous comeback the following year.

Carpenter made his comeback in the 1991–92 season and had one of his best single game performances on March 15, 1992, scoring two goals and assists each in a 5–1 Bruins victory over the Kings. With a focus on checking rather than sniping as a player, he would finish the year appearing in 60 games with 25 goals and 23 assists.

=== Washington Capitals (1992–1993) ===
Carpenter signed with the Capitals in 1992 as a free agent. He had 28 points in 68 games for the team. In seven total seasons for the team, Carpenter recorded 188 goals and 207 assists for the franchise.

=== New Jersey Devils (1993–1999) ===
In 1993, he signed with the New Jersey Devils in September, where he would play for the final six seasons of his NHL career. Focused on playing as a checking center with an emphasis on the face-off circle, Carpenter recorded 33 points in 76 games for his first season in New Jersey, which saw them narrowly miss out on the Stanley Cup Final.

In the subsequent strike-shortened 1994–95 season, he would appear in 41 regular season games and 17 playoff games for the team; he recorded five points in the playoffs, which saw the Devils win the Stanley Cup Final for the first time in franchise history.

Despite recording 18 points in 66 games of the 1997–98 season, he received votes for the Selke Trophy, finishing 7th in voting. Carpenter played in just 56 games of the 1998–99 season, recording 10 total points in 855 minutes of ice time. He was not offered a new contract from the team as a free agent, but he was approached with the offer to become an assistant coach with the Devils AHL affiliate in Albany. On August 12, 1999, he announced his retirement from the NHL.

In nineteen seasons of 1,178 NHL regular-season games, Carpenter record 320 goals and 408 assists for a total of 728 points.

== International career ==
Carpenters first international appearance came in 1981 for the U.S. National Junior Team, where he led the team with nine points in five games and was named the team’s most valuable player. At the age of 21, Carpenter was selected to represent the United States in the 1984 Canada Cup, Carpenter played in all six games, serving as a key forward with one goal and four assists. Following the conclusion of his NHL season with the Los Angeles Kings in 1987, Carpenter joined the U.S. national team for the Ice Hockey World Championship in Vienna, Austria, he played in all ten games scored four points (two goals and two assists) as the Americans finished seventh. Later that summer, he represented the United States for the final time as a player in the 1987 Canada Cup, recording three points (one goal and two assists) in five games as the team lost to team Canada in the semifinals.

For his contributions as an American hockey player, Carpenter was inducted into the United States Hockey Hall of Fame in 2007.

== Coaching career ==
Carpenter served in the New Jersey Devils organization for a number of years, starting in 1999. When the Devils won the 2000 Stanley Cup Final, Carpenter's name was engraved on the Stanley Cup as an assistant coach. He served as head coach of the Albany River Rats for the 2001–02 AHL season, which saw the team go 14–42–12 in his only season as head coach. He served on the New Jersey bench as an assistant for the following two seasons, which saw his name engraved on the Cup once more when the Devils won it in 2003. He departed the team in 2004.

From 2000 to 2010, he served as the Director of Program Development for the Valley Jr. Warriors of the Eastern Junior Hockey League.

In 2009, he became a team consultant for the Toronto Maple Leafs. He left the team in 2015.

In 2017, he joined the Kunlun Red Star as an assistant coach. Later on in the year he would take over as head coach after Mike Keenan was fired. Carpenter would go 7-13 as interim head coach. In 2019, he would take over interim head coach of EC Kassel Huskies.

In 2024, Carpenter was hired as the head coach of The Winchendon School Girls 19U Program. He coached the team to a 31–26–6 record in his first year.

== Awards and achievements ==
NHL

- Played in NHL All-Star Game (1985)
- Scored an assist on a goal by Ryan Walter after only 12 seconds of his debut game against the Buffalo Sabres on October 7, 1981. This is still the quickest assist by a player in his first game.
- Stanley Cup champion: 1995 (player); 2000, 2003 (coach assistant)

International

- 1981 U.S. National Junior Team MVP
- U.S. Hockey Hall of Fame (class of 2007)

High school/other

- Massachusetts High School Player of the year (1980, 1981)
- St John’s Prep Hall of Fame (class of 1986)
- Massachusetts Hockey Hall of Fame (class of 2004)

== Career statistics ==
=== Regular season and playoffs ===
			Regular season					Playoffs
Season	Team	League	GP	G	A	Pts	PIM	GP	G	A	Pts	PIM
1978–79	St. John's Prep	HS-MA	23	23	31	54	—	—	—	—	—	—
1979–80	St. John's Prep	HS-MA	33	28	37	65	—	—	—	—	—	—
1980–81	St. John's Prep	HS-MA	18	16	31	47	—	—	—	—	—	—
1981–82	Washington Capitals	NHL	80	32	35	67	69	—	—	—	—	—
1982–83	Washington Capitals	NHL	80	32	37	69	64	4	1	0	1	2
1983–84	Washington Capitals	NHL	80	28	40	68	51	8	2	1	3	25
1984–85	Washington Capitals	NHL	80	53	42	95	87	5	1	4	5	8
1985–86	Washington Capitals	NHL	80	27	39	56	105	9	5	4	9	12
1986–87	Washington Capitals	NHL	22	5	7	12	21	—	—	—	—	—
1986–87	New York Rangers	NHL	28	2	8	10	20	—	—	—	—	—
1986–87	Los Angeles Kings	NHL	10	2	3	5	6	5	1	2	3	2
1987–88	Los Angeles Kings	NHL	71	19	33	52	84	5	1	1	2	0
1988–89	Los Angeles Kings	NHL	39	11	15	26	16	—	—	—	—	—
1988–89	Boston Bruins	NHL	18	5	9	14	10	8	1	1	2	4
1989–90	Boston Bruins	NHL	80	25	31	56	97	21	4	6	10	39
1990–91	Boston Bruins	NHL	29	8	8	16	22	1	0	1	1	2
1991–92	Boston Bruins	NHL	60	25	23	48	46	8	0	1	1	6
1992–93	Washington Capitals	NHL	68	11	17	28	65	6	1	4	5	6
1993–94	New Jersey Devils	NHL	76	10	23	33	51	20	1	7	8	20
1994–95	New Jersey Devils	NHL	41	5	11	16	19	17	1	4	5	6
1995–96	New Jersey Devils	NHL	52	5	5	10	14	—	—	—	—	—
1996–97	New Jersey Devils	NHL	62	4	15	19	14	10	1	2	3	2
1997–98	New Jersey Devils	NHL	66	9	9	18	22	6	1	0	1	0
1998–99	New Jersey Devils	NHL	56	2	8	10	36	7	0	0	0	2
NHL totals			1,178	320	408	728	919	140	21	38	59	136

=== International ===
Year	Team	Event	GP	G	A	Pts	PIM
1981	United States	WJC	5	5	4	9	6
1984	United States	CC	6	1	4	5	4
1987	United States	WC	10	2	2	4	8
1987	United States	CC	5	1	2	3	4
Senior totals			21	4	8	12	16

== Personal life ==
Carpenter resides in Massachusetts with his wife, with whom they had three children together, all of whom participate in sports. His oldest child, his daughter Alex Carpenter, currently plays for the Seattle Torrent of the PWHL; she won the Olympic silver medal in 2014 and a gold medal in 2026 with the United States women's national ice hockey team, in addition to five IIHF Women's World Championship gold medals. His son Robert III "Bobo" had a 2-year entry-level contract with the New York Islanders as of 2019 and played two seasons for their AHL affiliate. He scored his first AHL goal in the third period of his first game. He has also played in played in the ECHL where he won the Kelly cup in 2024 and the EIHL.

Carpenter has also become involved in numerous charity events. In 2016, Carpenter ran the Boston Marathon in three hours and 47 minutes to help raise money for the Last Call Foundation. In 2017, he ran the event a second time, pushing Denna Laing, women's hockey player who was paralyzed in the 2016 Outdoor Women's Classic game, in a special racing wheelchair; they finished with a time of 4:32:30. In the process, the two would raise nearly $100,000 for a Canton-based nonprofit focused on spinal cord injury rehabilitation. Carpenter also participates in charity games for the Boston Bruins alumni organization.

== See also ==
- List of NHL players with 1,000 games played

Preceded by Darren Veitch	Washington Capitals first-round draft pick 1981	Succeeded by Scott Stevens
