= 37th National Hockey League All-Star Game =

Professional ice hockey exhibition game

37th NHL All-Star Game
	1	2	3	Total
Wales	2	2	2	6
Campbell	2	0	2	4
- Date: February 12, 1985
- Arena: Olympic Saddledome
- City: Calgary
- MVP: Mario Lemieux (Pittsburgh)
- Attendance: 16,825

The 37th National Hockey League All-Star Game was held in the Olympic Saddledome in Calgary, home of the Calgary Flames, on February 12, 1985. The Wales Conference defeated the Campbell Conference 6–4. The game's most valuable player was Mario Lemieux, who became the first rookie to win All-Star MVP honours, a feat that would not be repeated until 33 years later by Vancouver Canuck Brock Boeser in 2018.

== Host city ==
The 37th All-Star Game marked the first time the event was held in Calgary. The game was held in the two-year-old Olympic Saddledome, which had been built following the Flames arrival in Calgary, and in anticipation of the 1988 Winter Olympics. A sell-out crowd of 16,825 attended the game, and the gala also sold out. In total, $100,000 was raised by the Flames which was donated to charity. The traditional black-tie nature of the banquet and gala were eschewed for this game as the hosts asked attendees to dress up in western wear.

Campbell Conference and Edmonton Oilers head coach Glen Sather expressed displeasure that the fans in Calgary did not let go of the Battle of Alberta for the game. He took issue with the fans booing Edmonton's Wayne Gretzky during the player introductions and the game itself. "It's embarrassing when they boo Wayne when he touches the puck. They booed him once before when he was hurt so..." For his part, Gretzky downplayed Sather's concerns: "I've certainly got nothing against them booing me. I kind of get a kick out of it."

To help raise awareness for 1983–85 famine in Ethiopia, the NHL All-Stars participated in the Canadian entertainment's response to the crisis. The players, along with music producer David Foster, shot a video segment for the Northern Lights' song "Tears Are Not Enough".

== Highlights ==
For the first time, the NHL named honorary captains for each team. Hockey Hall of Fame goaltender Glenn Hall was named the honorary captain of the Campbell Conference, while Guy Lafleur, who had retired only three months previous, represented the Wales Conference. Lafleur returned to the game four years later, and thus became the only person to play in the NHL after serving as an honorary All-Star captain. The ceremonial faceoff was performed by Canadian astronaut Marc Garneau and used a puck that he had taken into outer space.

Mario Lemieux entered the game facing criticism from former NHL coach, and Canadian Broadcasting Corporation commentator, Don Cherry who stated that Lemieux was a "floater" in reference to Lemieux's lack of defensive play during the season. The 19-year-old rookie dismissed Cherry's arguments, stating that "the Penguins asked me to play offensively, not to care about my defensive play." Lemieux recorded two goals, including the game winner, and added an assist to earn honours as the game's most valuable player. Lemieux is the first player in All-Star Game history to win the award in his rookie year (33 years later, Brock Boeser would become the second rookie to be named All-Star Game MVP).

Edmonton's Mike Krushelnyski and Boston's Ray Bourque were named the second and third stars of the game. Bourque led all players offensively by recording four assists for the Wales Conference while Krushelnyski led the Campbell Conference with three assists. Neither of the Flames representatives scored. The game featured an increased European flavour when compared to previous All-Star Games. Five European players participated. Swedes Anders Hedberg and Pelle Lindbergh played for the Wales Conference. Swede Thomas Gradin, Czech Miroslav Frycer and Finn Jari Kurri represented the Campbell Conference. Hedberg and Frycer each scored a goal for their respective conferences.

== Team Lineups ==
=== Wales Conference All-Stars ===
- Coach: (Canada) Al Arbour (New York Islanders)

#	Nat.	Player	Pos.	Team
Goaltenders
30	(United States)	Tom Barrasso		Buffalo Sabres
31	(Sweden)	Pelle Lindbergh		Philadelphia Flyers
Defencemen
2	(Canada)	Phil Russell		New Jersey Devils
3	(Canada)	Scott Stevens		Washington Capitals
5	(United States)	Rod Langway		Washington Capitals
6	(United States)	Mike Ramsey		Buffalo Sabres
7	(Canada)	Raymond Bourque		Boston Bruins
24	(United States)	Chris Chelios		Montreal Canadiens
Forwards
9	(Canada)	Ron Francis	C	Hartford Whalers
10	(United States)	Bobby Carpenter	C	Washington Capitals
11	(Canada)	Mike Gartner	RW	Washington Capitals
12	(Canada)	Tim Kerr	C	Philadelphia Flyers
15	(Sweden)	Anders Hedberg	RW	New York Rangers
16	(Canada)	Michel Goulet	LW	Quebec Nordiques
17	(Canada)	Kirk Muller	C	New Jersey Devils
19	(Canada)	Bryan Trottier	C	New York Islanders
21	(Canada)	Brent Sutter	C	New York Islanders
22	(Canada)	Mike Bossy, Captain	RW	New York Islanders
27	(Canada)	John Tonelli	LW	New York Islanders
66	(Canada)	Mario Lemieux	C	Pittsburgh Penguins

=== Campbell Conference All-Stars ===
- Coach: (Canada) Glen Sather, Edmonton Oilers

#	Nat.	Player	Pos.	Team
Goaltenders
31	(Canada)	Grant Fuhr		Edmonton Oilers
35	(Canada)	Andy Moog		Edmonton Oilers
Defencemen
2	(Canada)	Al MacInnis		Calgary Flames
4	(Canada)	Kevin Lowe		Edmonton Oilers
7	(Canada)	Paul Coffey		Edmonton Oilers
8	(Canada)	Randy Carlyle		Winnipeg Jets
23	(Canada)	Paul Reinhart		Calgary Flames
24	(Canada)	Doug Wilson		Chicago Black Hawks
Forwards
9	(Canada)	Glenn Anderson	RW	Edmonton Oilers
10	(Canada)	Dale Hawerchuk	C	Winnipeg Jets
11	(Canada)	Brian Sutter	LW	St. Louis Blues
14	(Czechoslovakia)	Miroslav Frycer	RW	Toronto Maple Leafs
15	(Canada)	Paul MacLean	RW	Winnipeg Jets
16	(Canada)	Marcel Dionne, Captain	C	Los Angeles Kings
17	(Finland)	Jari Kurri	RW	Edmonton Oilers
20	(Sweden)	Thomas Gradin	C	Vancouver Canucks
25	(Canada)	John Ogrodnick	LW	Detroit Red Wings
26	(Canada)	Mike Krushelnyski	C	Edmonton Oilers
44	(Canada)	Steve Payne	LW	Minnesota North Stars
99	(Canada)	Wayne Gretzky, Captain	C	Edmonton Oilers

G = Goaltenders; D = Defencemen; C = Centre; LW/RW = Left Wing/Right Wing

== Game summary ==
	Wales Conference	Campbell Conference
Final score	6	4
Scoring summary	Francis (Kerr) 1:40 1st; Kerr (Goulet, Bourque) 5:31 1st; Hedberg (Lemieux, Chelios) 13:46 2nd; Lemieux (Muller, Bourque) 17:47 2nd; Lemieux (Bourque) 11:09 3rd; Gartner (Bourque) 19:51 3rd	Dionne (Ogrodnick) 6:33 1st; Frycer (Krushelnyski, Carlyle) 16:55 1st; Gretzky (Krushelnyski) 10:09 3rd; Carlyle (Krushelnyski) 17:09 3rd
Penalties	Muller (Tripping) 14:20 1st; Russell (Hooking) 1:52 3rd	Dionne (Holding) 6:46 3rd
Shots on goal	14-10-12–36	7-10-9–26
Win/loss	W–Pelle Lindbergh	L–Andy Moog

- Referee: Andy Van Hellemond
- Linesmen: Gerard Gauthier, Bob Hodges
- TV: CBC, SRC, USA Network

== See also ==
- 1984–85 NHL season
