= Scott Stevens =

Canadian ice hockey player and coach (born 1964)

- Hockey Hall of Fame, 2007
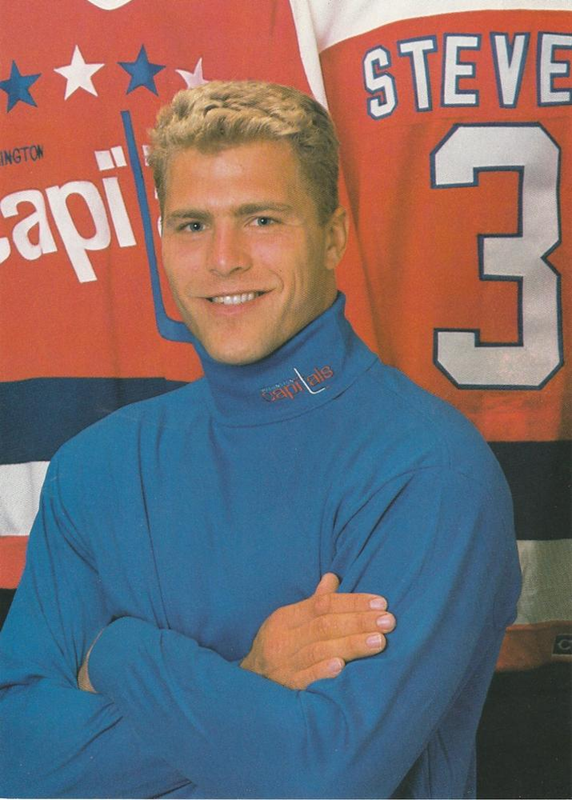
- Stevens with the Washington Capitals in 1989
- Born: April 1, 1964 (age 62) Kitchener, Ontario, Canada
- Height: 6 ft 2 in (188 cm)
- Weight: 215 lb (98 kg; 15 st 5 lb)
- Position: Defence
- Shot: Left
- Played for: Washington Capitals; St. Louis Blues; New Jersey Devils
- National team: Canada
- NHL draft: 5th overall, 1982; Washington Capitals
- Playing career: 1982–2004
Medal record
Representing Canada
World Championships
Silver medal – second place	1985 Prague
Silver medal – second place	1989 Sweden
Bronze medal – third place	1983 West Germany
Canada Cup
Gold medal – first place	1991 Canada Cup
World Cup
Silver medal – second place	1996 World Cup of Hockey

Ronald Scott Stevens (born April 1, 1964) is a Canadian professional ice hockey coach and former player. As a defenseman, Stevens played 22 seasons in the National Hockey League (NHL) for the Washington Capitals, St. Louis Blues and New Jersey Devils, serving as captain of the Devils from 1992 to 2004. Although offensively capable, his defensive play and his heavy body checking on opponents were crucial to his success.

Stevens started his career with the Capitals, where he helped the team make the Stanley Cup playoffs for the first time. After spending a season with the Blues, he was acquired by the Devils through arbitration. Personifying the team's defence-first mentality, he captained the Devils to four Stanley Cup Final appearances in nine years, winning three of them. In 2000, he won the Conn Smythe Trophy as the most valuable player of the 2000 Stanley Cup playoffs. Despite his team success with the Devils, he never won the James Norris Memorial Trophy as the league's best defenceman.

Stevens was later inducted into the Hockey Hall of Fame in 2007, his first year of eligibility. Stevens retired with the most games played by an NHL defenceman (1,635 games), later passed by Chris Chelios and Zdeno Chara. Stevens was also the youngest player in league history to reach 1,500 games played, playing in his 1,500th game at age 37 years, 346 days. He did not have a negative plus/minus in any of his 22 NHL seasons and had the most penalty minutes of any player enshrined in the Hall of Fame until Chris Chelios was inducted in 2013. In 2017, Stevens was named one of the "100 Greatest NHL Players" in history.

== Early life ==
Stevens was born in Kitchener, Ontario, to Larry and Mary Stevens, the middle child of three brothers. Larry owned a paper products company and was also a semi-professional Canadian football player. All three Stevens brothers played hockey as children; older brother Geoff would later go on to be a scout for the New Jersey Devils, while Mike, the youngest, enjoyed a brief NHL career with several teams.

As a youth, Stevens played in the 1976 Quebec International Pee-Wee Hockey Tournament with a minor ice hockey team from Kitchener. Growing up near Toronto, he was a fan of the Toronto Maple Leafs and idolized Leafs defenceman Börje Salming. Stevens attended Eastwood Collegiate Institute, where he played middle linebacker on the school's Canadian football team. One of his teammates was Markus Koch, who would go on to win a Super Bowl with the Washington Redskins of the National Football League. However, hockey was Stevens' true passion. He and his brothers often played hockey in the house, ruining the furniture repeatedly. He eventually earned a spot on the Kitchener Junior B team and passed on the opportunity to tour Czechoslovakia with the Kitchener midget team to play there. His play impressed scouts and he was taken ninth overall by his hometown Kitchener Rangers in the 1981 Ontario Hockey League (OHL) draft.

The 1981–82 Kitchener Rangers were a team that featured several future NHL players. The defensive corps included Dave Shaw and Al MacInnis, Wendell Young was the team's starting goaltender, and the top-scoring line on the team was Jeff Larmer, Brian Bellows and Grant Martin. Stevens and Shaw were an integral part of the Rangers' defence, playing in every game of the season en route to the team's Memorial Cup victory. In addition, both played in the OHL All-Star Game. Rangers head coach Joe Crozier said of Stevens, "He's come a long way this year ... He's strong, tough, handles the puck well and has tremendous hockey sense." Stevens led all rookie defencemen in scoring and was named the second-best defensive defenceman and second-best body-checker in a poll of OHL coaches.

== Playing career ==
=== Washington Capitals (1982–1990) ===
Stevens was taken fifth overall in the 1982 NHL entry draft by the Washington Capitals. Due to injuries to other players during training camp, Stevens made the team at age 18 and never played a game in the minor leagues. He made an immediate impact, scoring on his first shot in his first NHL game. He scored 25 points in his debut season and made the All-Rookie Team. In addition, he led all rookie defencemen in penalty minutes. He finished third in the voting for the Calder Memorial Trophy, which is awarded to the league's Rookie of the Year. He was also named the Capitals' Rookie of the Year. Stevens' debut with the Capitals coincided with the team's first playoff appearance, although they were eliminated in the first round by the New York Islanders.

The following year, he would nearly double his point total from the previous year, finishing with 13 goals and 32 assists for 45 points. Only teammate Larry Murphy had more points among defencemen. His 201 penalty minutes would lead the team; he would ultimately lead the Capitals in the category five times during his tenure with the team, and eventually set the team record for most career penalty minutes by a defenceman. However, Stevens' success did not translate to the Capitals, who were eliminated in the second round of the playoffs by the Islanders. During this period, Stevens learned from veterans Rod Langway and defensive linemate Brian Engblom on the finer points of playing defence. Head coach Bryan Murray also helped calm the fiery young Stevens, who would learn to fight less and play harder. Stevens spoke fondly of his time with the Capitals years later, saying:

We had a great bunch of guys and we worked hard. We were great defensively. We might have been at times a little challenged scoring and we might have been a bit challenged in the goal at times... But there are no regrets.

— Scott Stevens

The 1984–85 season would be a breakout year for Stevens. He set a team record for defencemen by scoring 16 power play goals, and tied a team record for goals by a defenceman with 21. His performance was good enough to land him a spot in the All-Star Game. Stevens would lead all Capitals defencemen in scoring for the first time, finishing the year with 21 goals and 44 assists, and earned the team's Fan Favorite Award. His offensive abilities and size made Murray consider moving him to winger. The Capitals finished second in the Patrick Division, but were out of the playoffs early again, this time courtesy of the Islanders. Before the next season, the Capitals acquired Dwight Schofield in the waiver draft. Schofield was known for his abilities as an enforcer, and his goal was to keep other teams' hitters away from Stevens and Langway, who were deemed too valuable to lose to penalties. The plan worked, as Stevens finished with 165 penalty minutes, the lowest in his career to that point. He also added 15 goals and 38 assists that season. However, the Capitals continued their playoff woes; after defeating the Islanders in the first round, they lost to the New York Rangers in the division finals.

The 1986–87 season saw Stevens return to his old ways, as he spent a career-high 283 minutes in the penalty box. The total set a Capitals record (since broken) for penalty minutes in a season. Despite missing three games with a broken right index finger, an injury he suffered against the Islanders, Stevens would finish the year third on the team in scoring with 61 points; his 51 assists were also good enough for second on the Capitals. The Caps were once again eliminated by the Islanders in the first round of the playoffs.

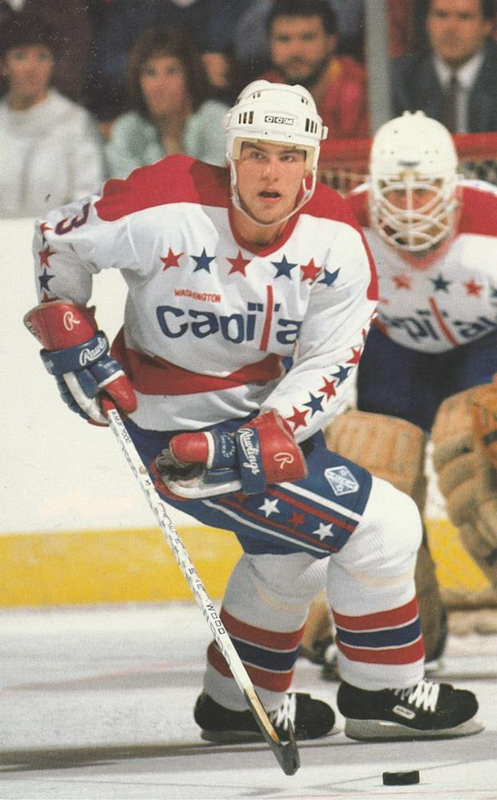
Stevens in action for the Washington Capitals in 1987

During the 1987–88 season, Stevens set Capitals records for most assists and most points by a defenceman in a game, with five assists against the Los Angeles Kings on December 6, 1987. Later that season, he would score at least one assist in eight consecutive games, setting another team record for defencemen. He finished the year second on the team in scoring with 12 goals and 60 assists for 72 points, tops among all Capitals blueliners. He ended up finishing second behind Boston Bruins defenceman Ray Bourque in the voting for the James Norris Memorial Trophy. In addition, he was named as an NHL first team All-Star. Stevens would suffer a shoulder injury in the first round of the playoffs against the Philadelphia Flyers, a series the Capitals would win. He returned in time for the Capitals' divisional finals against his future team, the New Jersey Devils. Despite tying a team record by posting four assists in game six of the series, the Capitals fell four games to three.

The Capitals won the Patrick Division in the 1988–89 season, and Stevens' 68 points (including a team-leading 61 assists) led Caps defencemen. He had 225 penalty minutes; this was the last time Stevens would have over 200 minutes in his career. He was named to his second All-Star game, and added an assist as the Wales Conference lost to the Campbell Conference 9–5. However, the Caps could not translate their regular-season success into the playoffs, as they lost in the first round to the Flyers. The 1989–90 season saw mixed success for Stevens. He struggled, as he was beset with injuries, including a broken foot that caused him to miss nearly two months. In addition, he was suspended for three games for gouging Chicago Blackhawks player Dave Manson in the eye during a fight. Stevens said he never hit Manson's eye, but that the eye hit Stevens' helmet during the fight. Missing a third of the season led to Stevens' lowest point total since his rookie year; he finished with just 11 goals and 29 assists for 40 points, although it was still second among Capitals defencemen. Despite his lowered stats, the Capitals made their furthest inroads in the playoffs ever. After defeating the Devils in the first round and the Rangers in the second round, the Capitals were in the Conference Final for the first time in team history where they were swept by the Bruins.

Over eight seasons with the Capitals, Stevens finished with 98 goals and 429 points in 601 games. He also set team records (all since broken) for penalty minutes (1,630), games played by a defenceman (601), points by a defenceman (429), goals by a defenceman (98), assists by a defenceman (331), playoff games played (67), playoff points (53), playoff assists (44) and playoff goals by a defenceman (9).

=== St. Louis Blues (1990–1991) ===
After eight seasons in Washington, Stevens felt it was time to move on. The St. Louis Blues courted him and offered a four-year deal worth $5.145 million. Since he was a restricted free agent, Washington had the option to match the offer sheet. However, they declined and consequently received two first-round draft picks plus $100,000 in cash, turning into five first-round picks if the Capitals did not have a top-seven draft pick in the 1991 or 1992 entry drafts, as compensation (two of these picks would become Sergei Gonchar and Brendan Witt).

Stevens' signing had far-reaching ramifications on player contracts in the NHL. At the time, the deal made him the highest-paid defenceman in the league. In addition, the deal included a $1.4 million signing bonus. Several defencemen considered superior players to Stevens, including Ray Bourque and Chris Chelios, were earning less money, and Capitals defenceman Kevin Hatcher held out until he received a contract similar to Stevens'. General managers worried that these players would begin demanding bigger contracts. The players did end up asking for more money, and this escalation was one of the factors in the 1994–95 NHL lockout several seasons later.

After he arrived in St. Louis, Stevens was named captain of the Blues. He scored 5 goals and added 44 assists for 49 points, good enough for fifth on a team led by Brett Hull and Adam Oates. He also made the Campbell Conference All-Star team. The Blues were eliminated in the second round of the playoffs by the Minnesota North Stars.

=== New Jersey Devils (1991–2004) ===
Stevens' time with the Blues would only last one season. In the offseason following the 1990–91 NHL season, the Blues signed Brendan Shanahan from the New Jersey Devils, who, like Stevens the year before, was a restricted free agent, entitling the Devils to compensation. As the Blues still owed first-round picks to the Capitals (now five instead of two, as the 1991 pick given up ended up being the 21st pick), other compensation had to be negotiated, and the Blues and Devils could not agree on what the compensation was; the Blues offered goalie Curtis Joseph, forward Rod Brind'Amour, and two draft picks, but the Devils only wanted Stevens. The case went to arbitration, and arbitrator Edward Houston awarded Stevens to the Devils as compensation on September 3, 1991, with cited news reports the next day first appearing on September 4, 1991.

==== 1991–1995 ====
Initially, Stevens refused to report to the Devils for training camp, and would not report until September 26, 1991, 22 days after the arbitration ruling. The Devils were already worried after captain Kirk Muller walked out of camp. Stevens and his wife had made plans to settle in St. Louis, and he wanted to end his career with the Blues. In addition, he was concerned about the apparent lack of unity in the organization, citing Muller's walkout as proof. Several Devils players were upset over the feeling that Stevens was being forced upon the team; some players, including Ken Daneyko, wanted more money, while other players wanted general manager Lou Lamoriello to trade Stevens. He would eventually report to the Devils three weeks later.

Stevens finished his first season in New Jersey fifth on the team in scoring, first among defencemen and good enough for a spot on the second All-Star team. He earned a spot on the All-Star roster for the second consecutive season and would miss only one All-Star game for the remainder of his career as a Devil. The Devils would be taken out of the playoffs by their rival, the Rangers, in seven games. In the off-season, Stevens replaced Bruce Driver as team captain, a title he held until his retirement.

Although he would miss part of the following season with a concussion, his 12 goals and 45 assists still led all Devils defencemen in scoring, The Devils were eliminated in the first round of the playoffs again, losing to the Pittsburgh Penguins in five games. Stevens stepped up his offensive game in 1993–94. He posted 18 goals and 60 assists, good enough for the team lead and a career-high in points. He won the NHL Plus-Minus Award, finishing with a +53; only Vladimir Konstantinov has led the league with a higher plus/minus rating since Stevens' win. The Devils made it to the Conference Final against the Rangers, where they fell in double overtime of game seven. Stevens finished as a runner-up to Ray Bourque for the Norris Trophy; the four-vote difference was the closest in Norris Trophy voting history.

After the 1993–94 season, Stevens was a potential free agent. Officials from the St. Louis Blues discussed a return to the team with him, and persuaded him to sign an offer sheet worth $17 million over four years on July 4, 1994. Five days later, the Devils matched the offer, and thus Stevens remained in New Jersey. However, the Devils later found out Stevens had heard from St. Louis management before the free agency period began, which was illegal under NHL policy. After a five-year investigation, the league fined the Blues $1.5 million and awarded the Devils two of St. Louis' first-round draft picks. Devils general manager Lou Lamoriello felt the punishment was not enough; he wanted five first-round draft picks plus damages. Despite the investigation, there was no evidence Stevens was aware of any wrongdoing.

After the 1994–95 season was delayed due to an owners' lockout, the Devils were off to a slow start, winning only 9 of their first 24 games. Despite the reduced schedule, Stevens managed 2 goals and 20 assists, once again leading defencemen in scoring. The Devils finished fifth in the conference, and advanced to the Stanley Cup Final, where they swept the heavily favoured Detroit Red Wings to win the franchise's first championship. Stevens' reputation as a hard hitter was reinforced in game two, where he struck Vyacheslav Kozlov with a blindside hit directly to the head that knocked him unconscious. It was determined that Kozlov suffered a concussion. Stevens then turned to Wings forward and former Washington teammate Dino Ciccarelli, who was upset about the check, and said, "You're next!"

==== 1996–1999 ====
The Devils expected to defend their Stanley Cup title the following season. However, they became the first team in 26 years to miss the playoffs following a championship. Stevens voiced the team's disappointment, saying, "After winning the Cup, you expect to definitely be in the playoffs the next year ... Maybe it was just a wakeup call to get back on track."

Stevens started the 1996–97 season with a one-game suspension due to high-sticking penalty against Igor Larionov, which drew blood. However, the team returned to a solid style of play and finished the season atop the Atlantic Division, though they would be eliminated in the playoffs once again by the Hudson River rival New York Rangers. Stevens finished second on the team among defencemen in scoring behind Scott Niedermayer.

For the most part, it seems to go with the guy who's got a lot of points... I don't think about it as much as I used to. I've been asked to play a certain role here, which doesn't help in that area. But I feel that gives the team a chance to win every night. That's the satisfaction I get.

— Scott Stevens, on not winning the Norris Trophy

Stevens' leadership continued into the next season. He signed a contract extension with the Devils, stating at the time that he wanted to finish his career with the team. Stevens was especially important to the Devils' defensive corps, as longtime Devil Ken Daneyko was undergoing rehabilitation for alcoholism. However, he suffered a hip pointer injury against the Tampa Bay Lightning and missed several games. Stevens once again had a good defensive season, although his lack of scoring kept him out of consideration for the Norris Trophy. The Devils finished as the top seed in the Eastern Conference but were eliminated in the first round by the Ottawa Senators.

The Devils made several changes before the 1998–99 season, including the hiring of Robbie Ftorek as head coach to replace Jacques Lemaire. The team continued its focus on defence, as the solid corps of Stevens, Daneyko and Niedermayer finished with plus-minuses of +29, +27 and +26 respectively. Unfortunately, the team was once again eliminated in the first round of the playoffs, this time by the Pittsburgh Penguins.

==== 2000–2004 ====
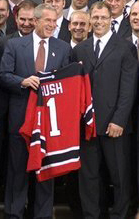
Stevens (right) with George W. Bush in 2003

The 1999–2000 Devils focused more on offense, which was reinforced by their 251 goals scored, good enough for second in the league. With four players scoring over 50 points, including rookie Scott Gomez's team-leading 51 assists, Stevens' 29 points were only good enough for tenth on the team and third among defencemen, behind Niedermayer and Brian Rafalski. Stevens also set an NHL record after becoming the first player to play in 600 games with two teams. After finishing the season in fourth place in the conference, the Devils swept the Florida Panthers and defeated the Toronto Maple Leafs in six games. The Devils then met their bitter rivals, the Philadelphia Flyers, in the Eastern Conference Final. After getting behind in the series three games to one, the Devils managed to win games five and six, setting the stage for game seven in Philadelphia. During the first period, Flyers star centre and former captain Eric Lindros was skating alone through the neutral zone with his head down, when Stevens hit him with a shoulder knocking him unconscious and giving him another concussion. Stevens and Lindros had numerous on-ice feuds in recent seasons; this was only Lindros' second game since returning from a concussion suffered in March against the Boston Bruins. Stevens had previously taken Flyers centre Daymond Langkow out with a concussion after game two. The Devils completed the comeback against the Flyers with a 2–1 victory to win the Eastern Conference Final. The Devils faced off against the defending Stanley Cup champion Dallas Stars in the Stanley Cup Final. Stevens and Rafalski were tasked with the responsibility of shutting down Dallas' scoring line of Mike Modano, Brett Hull and Joe Nieuwendyk. Stevens scored the game-winner in the first game of the series en route to a 7–3 Devils victory; the goal was his third of the playoffs. The Devils went on to win the Finals in six games after game five went to three overtimes and game six was decided in double overtime. Stevens earned an assist on Jason Arnott's Cup-winning goal, and he won the Conn Smythe Trophy for his leadership role on the team.

During the 2000–01 NHL season, led by Patrik Eliáš' franchise record of 96 points and Alexander Mogilny's team-leading 43 goals, the team finished first in the conference. However, the playoffs proved tough, as the underdog Carolina pushed the Devils to six games, then Toronto took a 3-2 series lead before New Jersey won the last two games to advance. New Jersey did manage to stifle Pittsburgh's Mario Lemieux (who made his comeback after retiring in 1997) and Jaromír Jágr in five games during the Eastern Conference Final. In the Stanley Cup Final, this time against the Colorado Avalanche, despite being up three games to two, the Devils could not finish off the Avalanche and lost the series in seven games. During the series the Colorado forwards were able to physically outmuscle New Jersey's defensemen, and Stevens was unable to stop Colorado captain Joe Sakic from scoring in game one and game seven, the latter where Stevens was felled by a check from Sakic who then promptly scored the third goal in a Colorado 3-1 victory. Stevens finished third in the voting for the Norris Trophy.

The next season, Stevens finished with the lowest scoring total in his career, though he did become the youngest player ever to play in 1,500 games. The Devils fell in the first round of the playoffs to the Hurricanes, who went on to lose to Detroit in the Stanley Cup Final.

Stevens and the Devils once again had success in 2002–03, finishing first in the division. In addition, he was named as captain of the Eastern Conference All-Star team for the first time, and finished the season with the fewest penalty minutes over a full season in his career. The Devils played well in the playoffs, eliminating Boston, Tampa Bay and Ottawa to face the Mighty Ducks of Anaheim in the Finals. Stevens and the Devils had a minor scare in game three of the semi-finals against Tampa Bay when a slapshot from Pavel Kubina hit the side of his head and forced him to leave the game. Although there was uncertainty about whether he would return for game four, Stevens returned and did not miss a game throughout the remainder of the playoffs. In game two of the Finals, he set the record for most playoff games by a defenceman, breaking the record by his former coach, Larry Robinson. Stevens added to his list of playoff hits when he blindside hit Mighty Ducks forward Paul Kariya to the head in game six. However, Kariya came back shortly thereafter and led the Ducks to a victory, forcing a game seven. The Devils kept the Ducks scoreless in game seven, 3–0, to win their third Stanley Cup in nine years. Stevens' appearance in game seven tied Patrick Roy's record for appearances in game sevens with 13. Despite the play of Stevens, Martin Brodeur, Jamie Langenbrunner and Jeff Friesen, the Conn Smythe Trophy went to Ducks goaltender Jean-Sébastien Giguère. Some speculated that there were too many worthy Devils candidates for the trophy, resulting in a split vote among sportswriters.

The 2003–04 NHL season would be the last for Stevens. Before ending the season, he surpassed former teammate Larry Murphy as the NHL's all-time leader in games played by a defenceman when he appeared in his 1,616th game in November. He missed several games in January with the flu, and while he was out, he was diagnosed with post-concussion syndrome (which would eventually coerce him into retirement). Despite missing the second half of the season, he was still voted in as a starter for the Eastern Conference All-Star team. Scott Niedermayer filled in as captain in Stevens' absence, but the loss of Stevens (as well as Daneyko, who had retired before the season) was too much of a loss for the Devils' defence, and they fell to the Flyers in the first round of the playoffs. In the off-season, Stevens recovered and continued to work out and expected to return to the Devils for the 2004–05 NHL season. However, the lockout canceled the entire season and Stevens announced his retirement on September 6, 2005, after 1,635 NHL games, fourth at the time (and now eleventh) all-time in games played, the leader in games played by a defenceman (since passed by Chris Chelios and Zdeno Chára), and 14th all-time in career penalty minutes.

== Coaching career ==
=== New Jersey Devils ===
On July 17, 2012, the Devils announced Stevens would return to the team as an assistant coach. After two seasons of failing to make the playoffs, Stevens stepped down as assistant coach in September 2014. His role as the assistant coach for the defenseman was filled by another former Devil, Tommy Albelin. However, three months later, Stevens returned to the Devils along with former assistant coach Adam Oates, relieving Peter DeBoer of his coaching duties. In a unique move, both Stevens and Oates were named as "interim" co-head coaches, with Stevens focusing on defencemen and Oates on forwards.

=== Minnesota Wild ===
On June 7, 2016, the Minnesota Wild hired Stevens as an assistant to head coach Bruce Boudreau. Less than a year later, on May 30, 2017, Stevens resigned to "spend more time with his family".

== International play ==
In addition to his NHL career, Stevens represented Canada in several international ice hockey competitions.

He attended summer camp with Team Canada before the 1983 World Junior Championships, but because of his commitment to the Capitals, he was unable to join the team.

His first experience with the senior team was at the 1983 World Ice Hockey Championships, where he won a bronze medal. The following year he made the Canadian team for the 1984 Canada Cup, but he did not play. During the 1985 World Ice Hockey Championships, he scored a goal and added two assists as Canada finished with a silver medal. He played only two games during the 1987 tournament; Canada finished in fourth place. Two years later, he scored two goals as Canada once again won the silver medal. During the tournament, he suffered a serious cut when Börje Salming's skate sliced his face; he would receive 88 stitches for the wound. Stevens finally won an international tournament with Canada during the 1991 Canada Cup.

Five years later, Stevens played in the 1996 World Cup of Hockey, the successor to the Canada Cup, and finished with two assists. Canada finished in second place after giving up four goals in the final four minutes of the championship game against the American team.

NHL players were first allowed to participate in the Olympic ice hockey tournament at the 1998 games. Stevens was selected to Team Canada, although New Jersey teammate Scott Niedermayer was controversially omitted. Stevens went scoreless in the tournament for the only time in his international career. Canada would finish fourth after losing their semi-final match-up against the Czech Republic in a shootout, followed by a 3-2 loss to Finland in the bronze medal match. Stevens would be part of Canada's orientation camp for the 2002 Games, but he would not make the final roster.

== Legacy ==
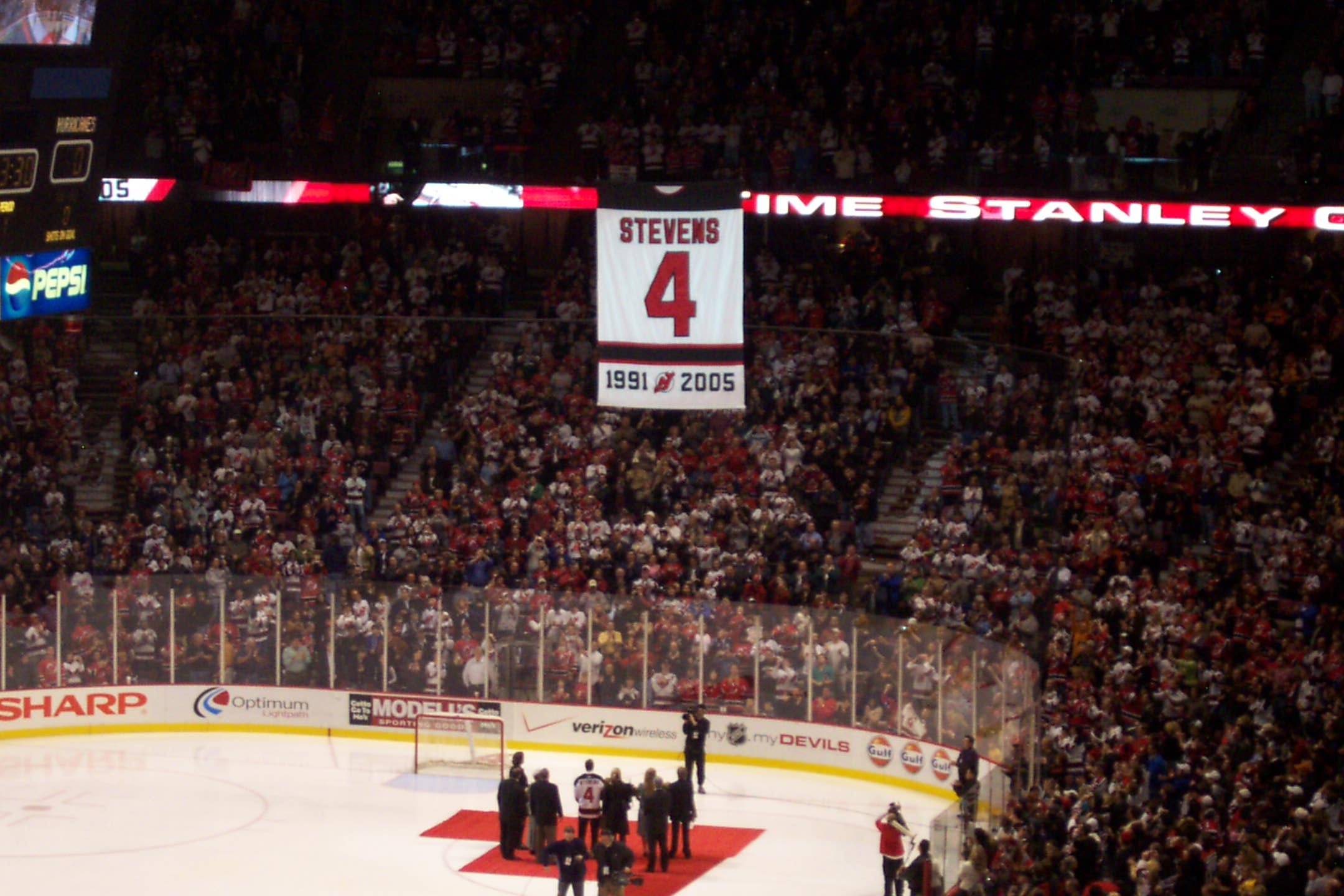
Stevens was the first Devils player to have his number retired; he was honoured at a ceremony at Continental Airlines Arena on February 3, 2006.

The longest-serving captain in Devils history, Stevens mentored the younger Devils defencemen like Colin White and Brian Rafalski, who was Stevens' defensive linemate. Long-time teammate Scott Niedermayer said Stevens was "not the most vocal guy around", but he would talk to players when it was necessary. Stevens was honoured by the Devils by becoming the first player in team history to have his number retired by the team–his number 4 was raised to the rafters on February 3, 2006. Additionally, the Kitchener Rangers have retired number 3 for Stevens.

Stevens left a controversial lasting legacy on the NHL, regarded as among the most feared defensemen to play against, and being remembered as one of the hardest hitters in NHL history. Some players have accused Stevens of playing cheap and intentionally trying to physically injure players permanently. He was named the fifth-most fearsome player in NHL history by the Sporting News in 2001 and was voted the toughest player in the NHL by the voters. Former NHL defencemen Dion Phaneuf and François Beauchemin are often compared to Stevens, and Phaneuf says he has idolized Stevens' style of play. Among the victims of Stevens' body checks were Slava Kozlov, Eric Lindros, Paul Kariya, Shane Willis and Ron Francis, the last of whom was inducted with Stevens into the Hockey Hall of Fame in 2007.

One of the more notable victims of Stevens' hits was young Shane Willis, who endured a concussion and was knocked out for the rest of the series. Carolina Hurricanes goaltender Artūrs Irbe said Stevens was "trying to kill [Willis] or put him out of the playoffs". Stevens responded:

What kind of respect do I get? ... Just because I'm a physical player, it's O.K. to come at me and do what you want? Hey, it's a hockey game. It's not figure skating. You know what? I can take a hit and I can give a hit. I don't care who it is. No one gets a free ride out there. I don't get a free ride, and no one gets a free ride from me.

On the other hand, Willis insisted that the hit was clean. Stevens was often credited with changing the momentum of a game not with a goal, but with a hard check, earning him the nickname "Captain Crunch".

Others counter that Stevens' hits were legal for the era in which he played. Despite being a devastating open-ice hitter, being accused by some of deliberately attempting to injure opponents, he was not considered a dirty player. In Stevens' entire career, he was suspended only twice for a total of four games, and received no suspensions for any of his hits (by contrast, New Jersey teammate Scott Niedermayer received a ten game suspension for hitting an opposite player in the head with his stick, while another contemporary, Chris Pronger has been suspended eight times). Out of Stevens' 2,785 career penalty minutes, only eight minutes were for elbowing penalties. It wasn't until later that the league changed its rules to protect defenseless players from head trauma, and with the NHL establishing a department of player safety, leading to postulation that Stevens would have been penalized more severely under the new rules.

== Personal life ==
Stevens met his wife Donna while he was playing junior hockey with Kitchener. The couple have three children; Kaitlin, Ryan, and Kara and reside in the town of Far Hills, New Jersey. He is a fan of the outdoors, and spent his summers away from hockey at Lake Catchacoma. He also enjoys duck hunting in his spare time and is a fan of the Three Stooges. After the September 11, 2001 attacks, he started a program called Scott's Kids Program for the families of the victims. Stevens joined the NHL Network as a commentator in December 2017.

=== Sexual assault allegation ===
In May 1990, while playing for the Capitals, Stevens was accused of raping a 17-year-old girl outside a bar, alongside teammates Dino Ciccarelli, Geoff Courtnall, and Neil Sheehy. The court case fell apart, though a spokesperson for the Metropolitan police at the time – with no supporting evidence available for use at trial – stated that the police "have sufficient grounds to believe that a criminal offense did occur."

== Career statistics ==
=== Regular season and playoffs ===
			Regular season					Playoffs
Season	Team	League	GP	G	A	Pts	PIM	GP	G	A	Pts	PIM
1980–81	Kitchener Ranger B's	MWJHL	39	7	33	40	82	—	—	—	—	—
1980–81	Kitchener Rangers	OHL	1	0	0	0	0	—	—	—	—	—
1981–82	Kitchener Rangers	OHL	68	6	36	42	158	15	1	10	11	21
1982–83	Washington Capitals	NHL	77	9	16	25	195	4	1	0	1	26
1983–84	Washington Capitals	NHL	78	13	32	45	201	8	1	8	9	21
1984–85	Washington Capitals	NHL	80	21	44	65	221	5	0	1	1	11
1985–86	Washington Capitals	NHL	73	15	38	53	165	9	3	8	11	12
1986–87	Washington Capitals	NHL	77	10	51	61	283	7	0	5	5	19
1987–88	Washington Capitals	NHL	80	12	60	72	184	13	1	11	12	46
1988–89	Washington Capitals	NHL	80	7	61	68	225	6	1	4	5	11
1989–90	Washington Capitals	NHL	56	11	29	40	154	15	2	7	9	25
1990–91	St. Louis Blues	NHL	78	5	44	49	150	13	0	3	3	36
1991–92	New Jersey Devils	NHL	68	17	42	59	124	7	2	1	3	29
1992–93	New Jersey Devils	NHL	81	12	45	57	120	5	2	2	4	10
1993–94	New Jersey Devils	NHL	83	18	60	78	112	20	2	9	11	42
1994–95	New Jersey Devils	NHL	48	2	20	22	56	20	1	7	8	24
1995–96	New Jersey Devils	NHL	82	5	23	28	100	—	—	—	—	—
1996–97	New Jersey Devils	NHL	79	5	19	24	70	10	0	4	4	2
1997–98	New Jersey Devils	NHL	80	4	22	26	80	6	1	0	1	8
1998–99	New Jersey Devils	NHL	75	5	22	27	64	7	2	1	3	10
1999–2000	New Jersey Devils	NHL	78	8	21	29	103	23	3	8	11	6
2000–01	New Jersey Devils	NHL	81	9	22	31	71	25	1	7	8	37
2001–02	New Jersey Devils	NHL	82	1	16	17	44	6	0	0	0	4
2002–03	New Jersey Devils	NHL	81	4	16	20	41	24	3	6	9	14
2003–04	New Jersey Devils	NHL	38	3	9	12	22	—	—	—	—	—
NHL totals			1,635	196	712	908	2,785	233	26	92	118	378

=== International play ===
Year	Team	Event	Result	GP	G	A	Pts	PIM
1983	Canada	WC	3rd place, bronze medalist(s)	10	0	2	2	8
1985	Canada	WC	2nd place, silver medalist(s)	8	1	2	3	6
1987	Canada	WC	4th	2	0	1	1	2
1989	Canada	WC	2nd place, silver medalist(s)	7	2	1	3	2
1991	Canada	CC	1st place, gold medalist(s)	8	1	0	1	4
1996	Canada	WCH	2nd place, silver medalist(s)	8	0	2	2	4
1998	Canada	OG	4th	6	0	0	0	2
Senior totals				49	4	8	12	28

=== All-Star Games ===
Year	Location	G	A	P	PIM
1985	Calgary	0	0	0	0
1989	Edmonton	0	1	1	0
1991	Chicago	0	0	0	0
1992	Philadelphia	1	0	1	0
1993	Montreal	0	2	2	0
1994	New York City	1	1	2	0
1996	Boston	0	0	0	0
1997	San Jose	0	2	2	0
1998	Vancouver	0	0	0	0
1999	Tampa Bay	0	0	0	0
2000	Toronto	0	0	0	0
2001	Colorado	0	2	2	0
2003	Florida	0	0	0	0
All-Star totals		2	8	10	0

== Awards ==
NHL

Award	Year(s)
NHL All-Rookie Team	1983
NHL All-Star Game	1985, 1989, 1991, 1992, 1993, 1994, 1996, 1997, 1998, 1999, 2000, 2001, 2003
Conn Smythe Trophy	2000
NHL first All-Star team	1988, 1994
NHL Plus-Minus Award	1994
NHL second All-Star team	1992, 1997, 2001
Stanley Cup	1995, 2000, 2003

== See also ==
- List of family relations in the NHL
- List of NHL players with 1,000 games played
- List of NHL players with 2,000 career penalty minutes

Awards and achievements
Preceded by Joe Nieuwendyk	Conn Smythe Trophy Winner; 2000	Succeeded by Patrick Roy
Preceded by Mario Lemieux	Winner of the NHL Plus/Minus Award; 1994	Succeeded by Ron Francis
Preceded by Bobby Carpenter	Washington Capitals first-round draft pick 1982	Succeeded by Kevin Hatcher
Sporting positions
Preceded by Rick Meagher	St. Louis Blues captain 1990–91	Succeeded by Garth Butcher
Preceded by Bruce Driver	New Jersey Devils captain 1992–2004; Scott Niedermayer* 2004	Succeeded by Patrik Eliáš
Preceded by Peter DeBoer	Interim Head coach of the New Jersey Devils; 2014–15 with Adam Oates	Succeeded by John Hynes
