= Dino Ciccarelli =

Canadian ice hockey player (born 1960)

- Hockey Hall of Fame, 2010
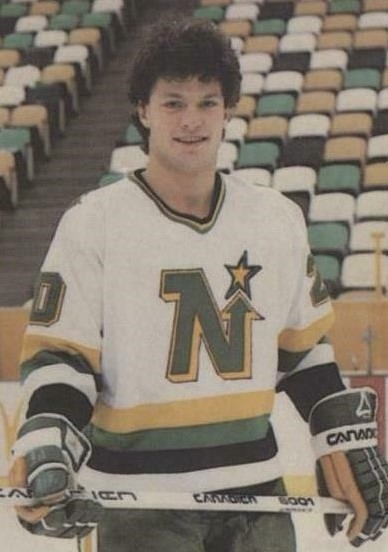
- Ciccarelli with the Minnesota North Stars in 1984
- Born: February 8, 1960 (age 66) Sarnia, Ontario, Canada
- Height: 5 ft 10 in (178 cm)
- Weight: 180 lb (82 kg; 12 st 12 lb)
- Position: Right wing
- Shot: Right
- Played for: Minnesota North Stars; Washington Capitals; Detroit Red Wings; Tampa Bay Lightning; Florida Panthers
- National team: Canada
- NHL draft: Undrafted
- Playing career: 1980–1999
Medal record
Representing Canada
Ice hockey
World Championships
Bronze medal – third place	1982 Finland

Dino Ciccarelli (/ˈdiːnoʊ sɪsəˈrɛli/ DEE-noh sis-ə-REL-ee; born February 8, 1960) is a Canadian former professional ice hockey player who was a right winger for 19 seasons in the National Hockey League (NHL) for the Minnesota North Stars, Washington Capitals, Detroit Red Wings, Tampa Bay Lightning, and Florida Panthers.

Ciccarelli excelled in his first two years in the Ontario Major Junior Hockey League (OMJHL) but suffered a horrific broken leg that saw doubts over whether he would play again or even be recruited by an NHL team. Determined to play again, he returned to action the following year but was not selected in the 1979 NHL entry draft. However, he was signed as a free agent in the fall that saw him play in the minor leagues before being called up late in the 1980–81 season, where he averaged nearly a point a game in 32 games as the team advanced to the 1981 Stanley Cup playoffs. The team lost in the Cup Final, but he set records for most goals and points for a rookie in the postseason that have been tied but not surpassed. He recorded the first two 50-goal seasons in franchise history and his 55 goals in the 1981–82 season has not been surpassed in franchise history. Disgruntled at management, he was traded to the Capitals late in the 1988–89 season; he left Minnesota as the all-time goals and points leader. He was traded to the Red Wings prior to the 1992–93 season, where he recorded his 500th goal and played in the Stanley Cup Final in 1995. He spent his final three seasons with Tampa Bay and Florida, with the latter seeing him become the ninth player to reach 600 goals in NHL history.

In over 1,200 games, he recorded 608 goals and 592 assists for 1,200 points. His 608 career NHL goals are the most goals scored by a draft-eligible player who was not drafted by an NHL team. Ciccarelli was elected to the Hockey Hall of Fame in 2010.

== Early life ==
Ciccarelli grew up playing minor hockey in his hometown of Sarnia, Ontario, in the Southwestern Ontario Minor Hockey League of the Ontario Minor Hockey Association. He made Sarnia's Jr. 'B' hockey team as a 15-year-old in the fall of 1975 and ended up leading it in scoring with 45 goals and 43 assists for 88 points in just 40 games. He is one of two Sarnia Jr. 'B' graduates to go on to be elected to the Hockey Hall of Fame (the other being Phil Esposito, who led the Sarnia Legionnaires in scoring in 1961).

Ciccarelli joined the London Knights of the Ontario Major Junior Hockey League as a 16-year-old for the 1976–77 season. In his first season with the Knights, Ciccarelli had 39 goals and 82 points in 66 games, finishing fifth in team scoring. In the playoffs, Ciccarelli had 11 goals and 24 points in 20 games, as London lost to the Ottawa 67's in the J. Ross Robertson Cup finals.

In his second season with the Knights in 1977–78, Ciccarelli scored a league high 72 goals, and added 70 assists for 142 points, which was third highest total in the OMJHL. In the post-season, Ciccarelli contributed six goals and 16 points in nine games but saw his season cut short on April 18 during practice. Ciccarelli recalled the injury in an 1987 interview:

It was a drill, and I was trying to go back up ice. I caught my skate on part of a broken stick that was on the ice. I slid on it, then kind of did the splits. Then I went down to my knees and slid into the boards. My right leg hit the boards and broke in half.

Ciccarelli had to have a 16-inch steel rod inserted to set the break, with the rod being kept for over two years. He was awarded the Jim Mahon Memorial Trophy, which is given to the highest scoring right winger in the OMJHL. Given a prognosis of maybe only being good for a pickup game by doctors, he underwent two years of physical therapy after spending five months on crutches. He returned to play 30 games of the 1978–79 season, playing in 30 games with eight goals and 19 points. In seven playoff games, Ciccarelli scored three goals and eight points. Owing to his size and speed after the leg injury, he was not selected in the NHL entry draft. However, Ciccarelli signed a contract with the Minnesota North Stars on September 28, 1979.

The North Stars kept Ciccarelli with the Knights for the 1979-80 OMJHL season, and Ciccarelli rebounded, scoring 50 goals and 103 points. In five games in the playoffs, Ciccarelli scored two goals, and finished with eight points.

== Professional career ==
=== Minnesota North Stars ===
Ciccarelli made his professional hockey debut with the Oklahoma City Stars of the CHL at the end of the 1979–80 season. In six games with Oklahoma City, Ciccarelli had three goals and five points.

He spent most of the 1980–81 season with Oklahoma City, playing in 48 games, scoring 32 goals and 57 points. Ciccarelli was brought up to the National Hockey League in December 1980. He scored his first goal on February 7 against the New York Islanders. In 32 games with the Minnesota North Stars, Ciccarelli had 18 goals and 30 points. In the playoffs, Ciccarelli scored 14 goals and 21 points in 19 games, as the North Stars made a run all the way to the Stanley Cup Final, where they lost to the New York Islanders. His goals and points for a postseason by a rookie player set records that have been matched but not surpassed in NHL history.

Ciccarelli spent the entire 1981–82 NHL season with the North Stars, playing in 76 games, scoring a team high 55 goals, while earning 106 points for the season. He tied the franchise record for most points in a period with four, doing so on November 11, 1981 and January 25, 1982. During the season, Ciccarelli played in the 1982 NHL All-Star Game, hosted by the Washington Capitals, with the Campbell Conference, where he assisted on a goal by Wayne Gretzky in a 4–2 loss to the Wales Conference. In the playoffs, Ciccarelli had three goals and four points in four games.

He saw a decrease in offensive production during the 1982–83 season, scoring 37 goals and 75 points in 77 games, which was 18 fewer goals and 31 fewer points than the previous season. Ciccarelli did appear in the 1983 NHL All-Star Game, hosted by the New York Islanders. Ciccarelli had a goal and an assist as the Campbell Conference defeated the Wales Conference 9–3. In the post-season, Ciccarelli appeared in nine games, scoring four goals and 10 points.

Ciccarelli had another solid season with Minnesota in the 1983–84 season, scoring 38 goals and 71 points in 79 games, helping the North Stars into the playoffs once again. In 16 playoff games, Ciccarelli had four goals and nine points, as the North Stars lost to the Edmonton Oilers in the Campbell Conference finals. Injuries cut short Ciccarelli's season in the 1984–85 season, playing in only 51 games, Ciccarelli scored 15 goals and 32 points, his lowest point total since his rookie season in 1980–81, and the lowest goal total of his NHL career. In nine playoff games, Ciccarelli had three goals and six points.

Ciccarelli had a rough start to the 1985–86 season, with his thoughts being focused on his toddler daughter Genna, who suffered severe burns in an accident that saw him not score in the team's first 17 games. She ultimately recovered and Ciccarelli ended up recording 44 goals with 89 points for his second-best total up to that point. In the March 3, 1986 game against the Detroit Red Wings, he tied a franchise record with three goals in the second period (various players have matched but not surpassed the record). In five playoff games, Ciccarelli was held to one assist.

In the 1986–87 season, Ciccarelli improved his offensive numbers once again, scoring 52 goals and 103 points in 80 games, which both led the club in scoring that made him the first North Star with multiple 50-goal seasons. The December 4 game saw him record four points against the New Jersey Devils to become the first (and so far only) player in franchise history with three games with four-point periods. The North Stars struggled during the season, and failed to qualify for the post season. Ciccarelli had his third straight 40+ goal season in the 1987–88 season, as he once again led Minnesota with 41 goals and 86 points in 67 games. It was another tough season for the team though, as they missed the playoffs for the second straight season.

In the 1988–89 season, Ciccarelli made his first all-star game appearance in six years, as he played with the Campbell Conference in the 1989 NHL All-Star Game held in Edmonton, Alberta. In the game, Ciccarelli assisted on a goal by Steve Yzerman, as the Campbell Conference won the game over the Wales Conference by a score of 9–5. Frustrations over with management boiled over late in the season. One highlight was a career-long points streak, where he recorded a point in twelve straight games from January 15 to February 9. Overall with Minnesota, Ciccarelli played in 65 games, scoring 32 goals and 59 points. On March 7, 1989, the North Stars traded Ciccarelli and Bob Rouse to the Washington Capitals for Mike Gartner and Larry Murphy.

He departed Minnesota with the most goals (332) and points (651) in franchise history. His 55 goals in the 1981–82 season was matched by Brian Bellows but has not been surpassed and his four 40-goal seasons also is still a franchise record.

=== Washington Capitals ===
Ciccarelli finished the 1988–89 season with the Washington Capitals, playing just 11 games, Ciccarelli scored 12 goals and 15 points, helping the team into the playoffs. He played his first game as a Capital on March 8, 1989, getting no points in a 3–2 loss to the Montreal Canadiens. He scored his first goal with Washington on March 11, 1989, scoring against John Vanbiesbrouck in a 4–2 win over the New York Rangers. On March 18, 1989, Ciccarelli had a four-goal, seven point game in a huge 8–2 victory over the Hartford Whalers. Ciccarelli appeared in his first playoff game with the Capitals on April 5, 1989, getting no points in a 3–2 win over the Philadelphia Flyers. He scored his first playoff goal with Washington on April 6, 1989, scoring against Ron Hextall in a 3–2 loss. Ciccarelli played in six games, scoring three goals and six points as the Capitals were eliminated by the Flyers.

In Ciccarelli's first full season with the Capitals, he scored 41 goals in the 1989–90 season, which marked his fifth consecutive season of 40+ goals, while finishing with a team high 79 points. Ciccarelli had a four-goal game against the Quebec Nordiques on February 6, 1990, in a 12–2 victory. In the playoffs, Ciccarelli had eight goals and 11 points in eight games, which started with the April 5 game against the New Jersey Devils that saw him record a hat-trick with an assist in the 5–4 overtime victory. His eight goals temporarily set a franchise record for a postseason. However, in Game 2 of the second round against the New York Rangers on April 21, he suffered a sprained knee that saw him knocked out for the rest of the playoffs. Ciccarelli suffered a fractured right thumb injury in October of 1990 that saw him miss nearly two months of the season. He played in 54 games and scored 21 goals with 39 points, his lowest totals in six years. He did score a hat trick against the Edmonton Oilers on February 8, 1991, in a 6–3 win. Ciccarelli was productive in the playoffs, scoring five goals and nine points in 11 games.

Ciccarelli rebounded the following year, scoring a team-high 38 goals and earning 76 points, helping the Capitals into the playoffs once again. In the playoffs, Ciccarelli had a four-goal game on April 25, 1992, as Washington defeated the Pittsburgh Penguins 7–2. In seven games, he scored five goals and nine points. On June 20, 1992, Ciccarelli was traded from the Capitals to the Detroit Red Wings for Kevin Miller. His 21 goals in the Stanley Cup playoffs was the most in franchise history when he departed Washington.

=== Detroit Red Wings ===
Ciccarelli made his debut with the Detroit Red Wings on October 6, 1992, getting no points in a 4–1 loss to the Winnipeg Jets. On October 8, 1992, Ciccarelli earned his first goal as a Red Wing, scoring against Kelly Hrudey of the Los Angeles Kings in a 5–3 victory. Ciccarelli finished his first season with Detroit with 41 goals and 97 points, which were both the second highest totals on the team. Ciccarelli's 97 points were his highest since 1986–87, when he recorded 103 with the Minnesota North Stars. Ciccarelli played his first playoff game with the Red Wings on April 19, 1993, earning an assist in a 6–3 win over the Toronto Maple Leafs. Ciccarelli scored his first playoff goal as a member of the Red Wings on April 27, 1993, against Felix Potvin in a 5–4 loss to the Maple Leafs. On April 29, 1993, Ciccarelli had a hat trick for the Red Wings in a 7–3 win over Toronto. Overall, Ciccarelli appeared in seven playoff games, scoring four goals and six points.

Ciccarelli saw his point total decline by 40 in the 1993–94 season, as he scored 28 goals and 57 points in 66 games. On January 8, 1994, in his 946th game, he scored his 500th career goal off Kelly Hrudey of the Los Angeles Kings. He recorded a six-point game against the Vancouver Canucks on April 5, scoring four goals and adding two assists in an 8–3 victory; it is the most recent time a Red Wing has recorded six points in a game. In the post-season, Ciccarelli had five goals and seven points in seven games.

With a shortened 1994–95 season due to the lockout, Ciccarelli appeared in 42 of 48 games, scoring 16 goals and 43 points, which placed him third in team scoring. Ciccarelli had a four assist game against the Winnipeg Jets on March 22, 1995, in a 6–3 win. In the playoffs, Ciccarelli had a hat trick against the Dallas Stars on May 11, 1995, in a 5–1 victory. He finished the playoffs with nine goals and 11 points in 16 games, as the Red Wings lost to the New Jersey Devils in the 1995 Stanley Cup Final.

In the 1995–96 season, Ciccarelli scored 22 goals and 43 points in 64 games, helping the Red Wings set an NHL record for wins in a season with 62. In the post-season, Ciccarelli had six goals and eight points in 17 games. In game six of the 1996 Western Conference Finals, Claude Lemieux laid a vicious hit on Kris Draper. The Red Wings lost to the Avalanche in six games and Lemieux was given suspensions in the first two games of the Stanley Cup Final. When interviewed after the game, Ciccarelli reacted and coldly stated, "I can't believe I shook this guy's friggin' hand after the game! That pisses me right off!".

On August 27, 1996, with the impending waiver draft looming, the Red Wings traded Ciccarelli to the Tampa Bay Lightning for a fourth-round draft pick in the 1998 NHL entry draft.

=== Tampa Bay Lightning ===
Ciccarelli played his first game as a member of the Tampa Bay Lightning on October 5, 1996, getting a goal and two points in a 4–3 win over the Pittsburgh Penguins. On November 8, 1996, Ciccarelli had a hat trick against the Pittsburgh Penguins in a 5–5 tie. Ciccarelli played in the 1997 NHL All-Star Game held in San Jose, California, where he had an assist for the Eastern Conference in an 11–7 win over the Western Conference. He finished the 1996–97 season playing in 77 games, scoring a team high 35 goals, while earning 60 points. Notably, he scored the final goal in the last game that the Hartford Whalers played in on April 13, 1997, scoring the only goal for the Lightning in a 2–1 loss.

He began the 1997–98 season with the Lightning; he played in 34 games with Tampa Bay, scoring 11 goals and 17 points. On January 15, 1998, the Lightning traded Ciccarelli and Jeff Norton to the Florida Panthers for Mark Fitzpatrick and Jody Hull.

=== Florida Panthers ===
Ciccarelli played his first game with the Florida Panthers on January 21, 1998. He scored his first goal with Florida three days later against Kelly Hrudey of the San Jose Sharks in a 1–1 tie. On February 3, he recorded his 600th career goal, doing so against Chris Osgood of the Detroit Red Wings (which tied the game in an eventual 1–1 finish) to become the ninth player to reach the mark in NHL history. He finished the season with five goals and 16 points in 28 games with the Panthers.

Ciccarelli had an injury plagued 1998–99 season, as he missed the majority of the season after suffering a back injury against the Chicago Blackhawks on November 4, 1998. He played in only 14 games, scoring six goals and seven points. On August 31, 1999, Ciccarelli announced his retirement. He retired as the active leader in power-play goals with 232, which was third-most in NHL history. In addition to retiring with the ninth most goals in NHL history, he was one of ten players with eleven 30-goal seasons.

=== International career ===
Ciccarelli played with Canada at various international events during his career. At the 1980 World Junior Ice Hockey Championships held in Helsinki, Finland, Ciccarelli had five goals and six points in five games, as Canada finished in fifth place. At the 1982 IIHF World Hockey Championship held in Finland, Ciccarelli had two goals and three points in nine games, as the Canadians won the Bronze Medal. Ciccarelli also played in the 1987 IIHF World Hockey Championship in Austria, getting four goals and six points in 10 games as Canada finished in fourth place.

== Legal issues ==
Ciccarelli's career featured some controversial moments, both on and off the ice. In 1987, he pleaded guilty to indecent exposure and received probation. Then on January 6, 1988, in a game played at Maple Leaf Gardens, Ciccarelli attacked then-Maple Leafs rookie defenceman Luke Richardson with his stick. As a result of this incident, Ciccarelli was convicted of assault, fined $1,000, and sentenced to one day in jail in what The Washington Post stated was "the first time a hockey player had been sentenced to a jail term for an on-ice offense." Ciccarelli was the last NHL player to go on trial for an on-ice attack until Marty McSorley in 2000.

In May 1990, while playing for the Capitals, Ciccarelli was accused of raping a 17-year-old girl outside a bar, alongside teammates Geoff Courtnall, Scott Stevens, and Neil Sheehy. A spokesperson for the Metropolitan Police Department at the time made comments to The Washington Post that the department did “have sufficient grounds to believe that a criminal offense did occur." One Capitals teammate testified that he saw a struggle. However, the criminal case fell apart, with differing accounts coming from the victim and the driver of the limousine on the night of the alleged assault (there were no disputes about her stepping into the vehicle parked behind the bar and that sexual activity occurred). The case was brought to a D.C. Superior Court grand jury one month after the incident, but no criminal indictments were returned and no civil cases were ever filed.

== Post-playing career ==
Ciccarelli was inducted into the Hockey Hall of Fame in 2010, eight years after he first became eligible. Press reports noted the surprise at his induction as the only NHL player inducted that year along with speculation that his criminal activity was the reason it took him years to gain entrance.

His junior team, the London Knights, retired Ciccarelli's number 8 in 2002.

Ciccarelli owned the nightclub Club 22 in Shelby Charter Township, named for the jersey number he wore with the Capitals, Red Wings, Lightning and Panthers. It was closed in 2011. Shortly after closing, Ciccarelli opened a sports bar in the same location. The name of the establishment is Ciccarelli's Sports Bar Theater, named after the "theater" style atmosphere. He has since opened two additional sports bars, one across from the Palace of Auburn Hills; and the other at the site of the former Post Bar in downtown Detroit, near Cobo Center. The Detroit location is only open for Red Wings home games and other special events.

== Career statistics ==
=== Regular season and playoffs ===
			Regular season					Playoffs
Season	Team	League	GP	G	A	Pts	PIM	GP	G	A	Pts	PIM
1975–76	Sarnia Bees	WOHL	40	45	43	88	—	—	—	—	—	—
1976–77	London Knights	OMJHL	66	39	43	82	45	20	11	13	24	14
1977–78	London Knights	OMJHL	68	72	70	142	49	9	6	10	16	6
1978–79	London Knights	OMJHL	30	8	11	19	35	7	3	5	8	0
1979–80	London Knights	OMJHL	62	50	53	103	72	5	2	6	8	15
1979–80	Oklahoma City Stars	CHL	6	3	2	5	0	—	—	—	—	—
1980–81	Oklahoma City Stars	CHL	48	32	25	57	45	—	—	—	—	—
1980–81	Minnesota North Stars	NHL	32	18	12	30	29	19	14	7	21	25
1981–82	Minnesota North Stars	NHL	76	55	51	106	138	4	3	1	4	2
1982–83	Minnesota North Stars	NHL	77	37	38	75	94	9	4	6	10	11
1983–84	Minnesota North Stars	NHL	79	38	33	71	58	16	4	5	9	27
1984–85	Minnesota North Stars	NHL	51	15	17	32	41	9	3	3	6	8
1985–86	Minnesota North Stars	NHL	75	44	45	89	51	5	0	1	1	6
1986–87	Minnesota North Stars	NHL	80	52	51	103	88	—	—	—	—	—
1987–88	Minnesota North Stars	NHL	67	41	45	86	79	—	—	—	—	—
1988–89	Minnesota North Stars	NHL	65	32	27	59	64	—	—	—	—	—
1988–89	Washington Capitals	NHL	11	12	3	15	12	6	3	3	6	12
1989–90	Washington Capitals	NHL	80	41	38	79	122	8	8	3	11	6
1990–91	Washington Capitals	NHL	54	21	18	39	66	11	5	4	9	22
1991–92	Washington Capitals	NHL	78	38	38	76	78	7	5	4	9	14
1992–93	Detroit Red Wings	NHL	82	41	56	97	81	7	4	2	6	16
1993–94	Detroit Red Wings	NHL	66	28	29	57	73	7	5	2	7	14
1994–95	Detroit Red Wings	NHL	42	16	27	43	39	16	9	2	11	22
1995–96	Detroit Red Wings	NHL	64	22	21	43	99	17	6	2	8	26
1996–97	Tampa Bay Lightning	NHL	77	35	25	60	116	—	—	—	—	—
1997–98	Tampa Bay Lightning	NHL	34	11	6	17	42	—	—	—	—	—
1997–98	Florida Panthers	NHL	28	5	11	16	28	—	—	—	—	—
1998–99	Florida Panthers	NHL	14	6	1	7	27	—	—	—	—	—
NHL totals			1,232	608	592	1,200	1,425	141	73	45	118	211

=== International ===
Year	Team	Event	GP	G	A	Pts	PIM
1980	Canada	WJC	5	5	1	6	2
1982	Canada	WC	9	2	1	3	0
1987	Canada	WC	10	4	2	6	2
Junior totals			5	5	1	6	2
Senior totals			19	6	3	9	2

== Awards and achievements ==
Award	Year(s)
Junior
QMJHL Second All-Star Team	1978
NHL
All-Star Game	1982, 1983, 1989, 1997

== Records ==
=== NHL official records ===
- Most points by a rookie in a Stanley Cup postseason: 21 (1981), shared with Jake Guentzel and Ville Leino.
- Most goals by a rookie in a Stanley Cup postseason: 14 (1981), shared with Jake Guentzel.
- 15th player to score 20 goals in first 15 games of the season (1986–87 season).
- Most power-play goals in a single Stanley Cup playoff game: 3 (April 29, 1993, May 11, 1995), shared with 11 other players
- Only player with multiple Stanley Cup playoff games of three power-play goals (2)

=== Stars records ===
- Most career hat-tricks – 14
- Goals per game – 0.55

== See also ==
- List of NHL statistical leaders
- List of NHL players with 1,000 points
- List of NHL players with 500 goals
- List of NHL players with 1,000 games played
