= Kevin Dean (ice hockey) =

American ice hockey player and coach

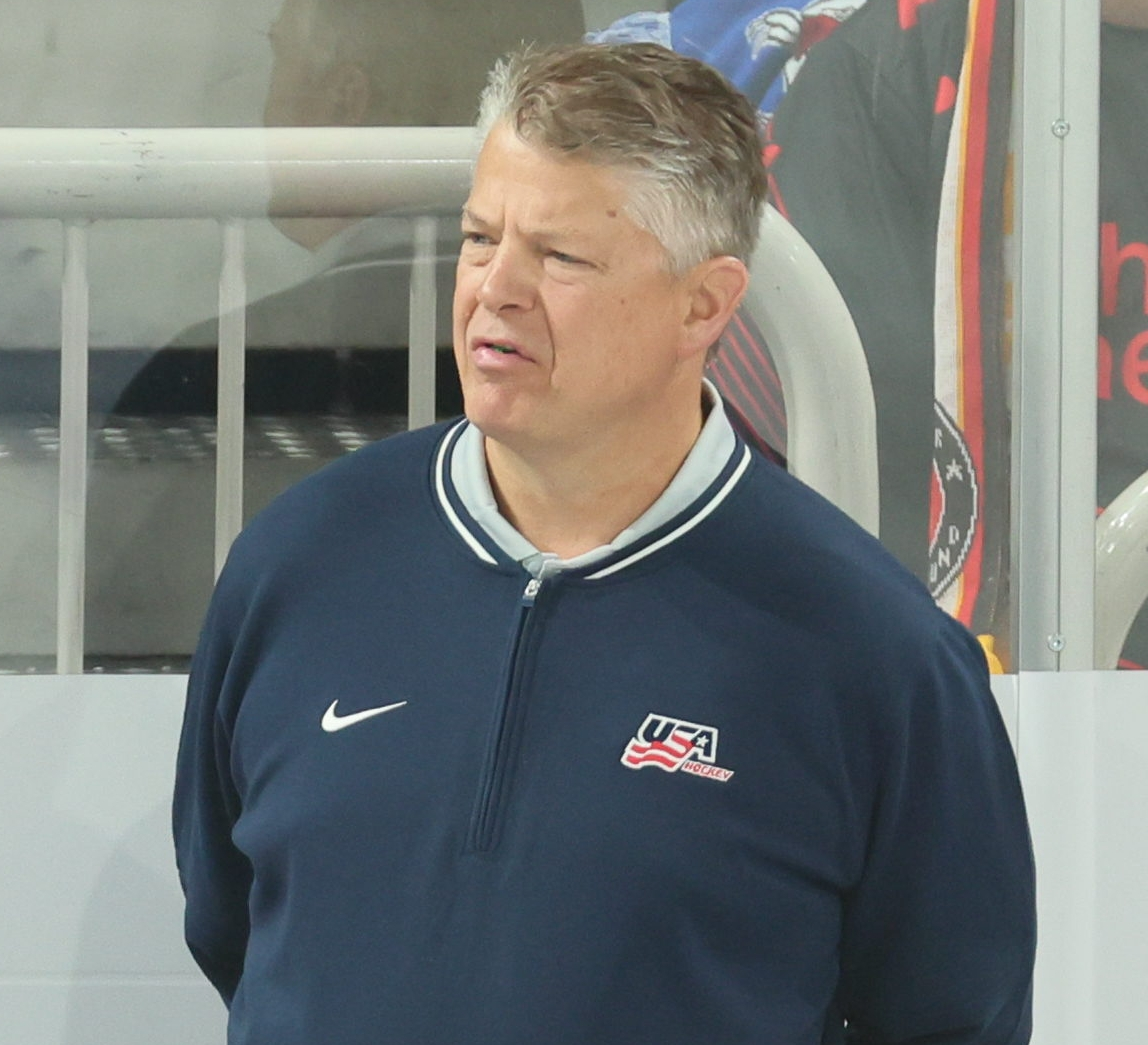
- Born: April 1, 1969 (age 57) Madison, Wisconsin, U.S.
- Height: 6 ft 2 in (188 cm)
- Weight: 195 lb (88 kg; 13 st 13 lb)
- Position: Defense
- Shot: Left
- Played for: New Jersey Devils; Atlanta Thrashers; Dallas Stars; Chicago Blackhawks
- National team: United States
- NHL draft: 86th overall, 1987; New Jersey Devils
- Playing career: 1991–2002

Kevin Charles Dean (born April 1, 1969) is an American former professional ice hockey player who most recently served as an assistant coach for the Vancouver Canucks in the National Hockey League (NHL). Dean played seven seasons in the NHL for the New Jersey Devils, Atlanta Thrashers, Dallas Stars, and Chicago Blackhawks.

== Playing career ==
Kevin Dean was drafted 86th overall in the 1987 NHL entry draft by the New Jersey Devils. He then played four years at the University of New Hampshire before transferring to the American Hockey League (AHL). In 1994–95 Dean helped the Albany River Rats win the AHL's Calder Cup championship. He made his NHL debut the same season and was a member of the Stanley Cup champion New Jersey Devils. Following a few seasons transferring between the minors and NHL, the Atlanta Thrashers claimed Dean in the 1999 NHL Expansion Draft. He would play for multiple teams in the NHL but never secure a permanent spot, retiring in 2002. Kevin Dean had to stop playing due to heart problems after ten years.

== Coaching career ==
Kevin Dean then became head coach of the Trenton Devils, the ECHL team owned and affiliated with the New Jersey Devils, from August 2006 through the 2010–11 season, after which the team suspended operations.

Prior to the 2011–12 season, he was named an assistant coach with the Providence Bruins of the American Hockey League. He became the P-Bruins head coach on July 18, 2016. One season later, he was again promoted within the Bruins' organization to be an assistant coach with the Boston Bruins.

Dean served three seasons as an assistant coach for the Chicago Blackhawks, working with the team's defencemen. On June 5, 2025, Dean was hired by the Vancouver Canucks as an assistant coach to Adam Foote and succeeded Foote in his previous role as a defensive development coach. On May 19, 2026, the Canucks fired Foote and his coaching staff, including Dean, after the team finished the season in last place with a 25–49–8 record.

Dean also served as an assistant coach for Team USA at the 2025 IIHF World Championships, winning a gold medal.

== Career statistics ==
=== Regular season and playoffs ===
			Regular season					Playoffs
Season	Team	League	GP	G	A	Pts	PIM	GP	G	A	Pts	PIM
1985–86	Culver Military Academy	USHS	35	28	44	72	48	—	—	—	—	—
1986–87	Culver Military Academy	USHS	25	19	25	44	30	—	—	—	—	—
1987–88	U. of New Hampshire	HE	27	1	6	7	34	—	—	—	—	—
1988–89	U. of New Hampshire	HE	34	1	12	13	28	—	—	—	—	—
1989–90	U. of New Hampshire	HE	39	2	6	8	42	—	—	—	—	—
1990–91	U. of New Hampshire	HE	31	10	12	22	22	—	—	—	—	—
1990–91	Utica Devils	AHL	7	0	1	1	2	—	—	—	—	—
1991–92	Cincinnati Cyclones	ECHL	30	3	22	25	43	9	1	6	7	8
1991–92	Utica Devils	AHL	23	0	3	3	6	—	—	—	—	—
1992–93	Utica Devils	AHL	57	2	16	18	76	5	1	0	1	8
1992–93	Cincinnati Cyclones	IHL	13	2	1	3	15	—	—	—	—	—
1993–94	Albany River Rats	AHL	70	9	33	42	92	5	0	2	2	7
1994–95	Albany River Rats	AHL	68	5	37	42	66	8	0	4	4	4
1994–95	New Jersey Devils	NHL	17	0	1	1	4	3	0	2	2	0
1995–96	New Jersey Devils	NHL	41	0	6	6	28	—	—	—	—	—
1995–96	Albany River Rats	AHL	1	1	0	1	2	—	—	—	—	—
1996–97	New Jersey Devils	NHL	28	2	4	6	6	1	1	0	1	0
1996–97	Albany River Rats	AHL	2	0	1	1	4	—	—	—	—	—
1997–98	New Jersey Devils	NHL	50	1	8	9	12	5	1	0	1	2
1997–98	Albany River Rats	AHL	2	0	1	1	2	—	—	—	—	—
1998–99	New Jersey Devils	NHL	62	1	10	11	22	7	0	0	0	0
1999–00	Atlanta Thrashers	NHL	23	1	0	1	14	—	—	—	—	—
1999–00	Dallas Stars	NHL	14	0	0	0	10	—	—	—	—	—
1999–00	Chicago Blackhawks	NHL	27	2	8	10	12	—	—	—	—	—
2000–01	Chicago Blackhawks	NHL	69	0	11	11	30	—	—	—	—	—
2001–02	Milwaukee Admirals	AHL	76	5	14	19	33	—	—	—	—	—
NHL totals			331	7	48	55	138	16	2	2	4	2

=== International ===
Year	Team	Event	Result	GP	G	A	Pts	PIM
1988	United States	WJC	6th	7	0	0	0	0
1998	United States	WC	12th	3	0	0	0	0
Junior totals				7	0	0	0	0
Senior totals				3	0	0	0	0

== Awards and honors ==
Award	Year	Ref
AHL
All-Star Game	1995	
First All-Star Team	1995	
Calder Cup champion	1995	
NHL
Stanley Cup champion	1995	
