= Tommy Albelin =

Swedish ice hockey player

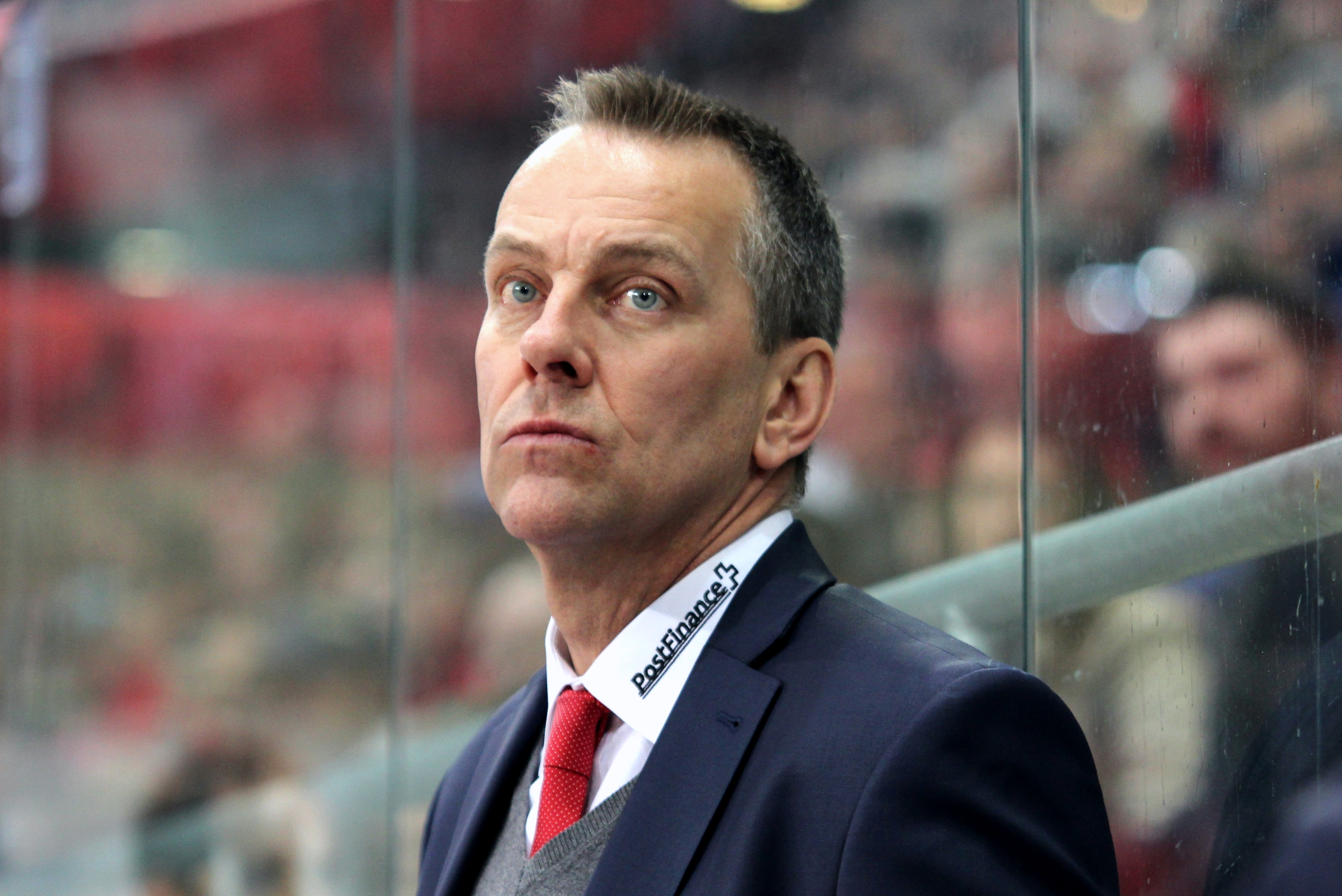
- Tommy Albelin coaching Team Switzerland against Team Russia during an international game in April 2017
- Born: 21 May 1964 (age 62) Stockholm, Sweden
- Height: 6 ft 1 in (185 cm)
- Weight: 200 lb (91 kg; 14 st 4 lb)
- Position: Defence
- Shot: Left
- Played for: Djurgårdens IF; Quebec Nordiques; New Jersey Devils; Calgary Flames
- National team: Sweden
- NHL draft: 152nd overall, 1983; Quebec Nordiques
- Playing career: 1982–2006
- Website: www.tommyalbelin.com

Tommy Albelin (born 21 May 1964) is a Swedish former ice hockey defenceman and coach. He most recently served as an assistant coach for the New York Islanders. He was formerly an assistant coach for Switzerland's national team. He also was world champion in 1987 and competed in the men's tournament at the 1998 Winter Olympics.

== Playing career ==
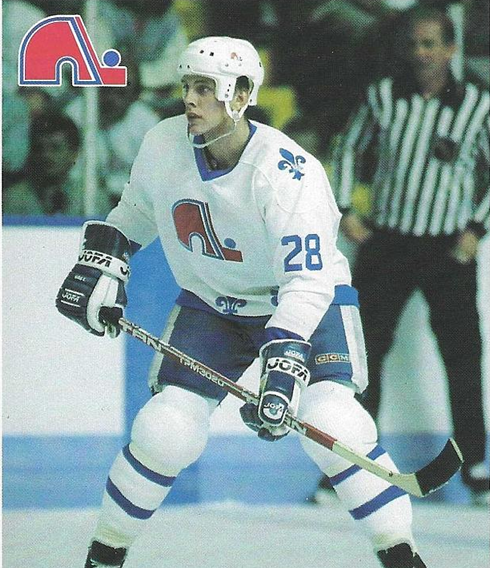
Tommy Albelin for 1987 card, Quebec Nordiques

Albelin has, over the course of a 24-year professional career, played a total of 952 games for three NHL teams: the Quebec Nordiques, the New Jersey Devils, and the Calgary Flames. Albelin was drafted 152nd overall by Quebec in the 1983 NHL entry draft. Before joining the club he played five seasons for Djurgårdens IF in the Swedish Elitserien, winning the Swedish championship in his first year (1982–83). Albelin left for Quebec upon the conclusion of the 1986–87 season. He played a year and a half for the Nordiques before being traded to New Jersey. It would be with the Devils that he would play 10 seasons for and win two Stanley Cups, in 1995 and 2003. In 1996, he was traded to Calgary, but he signed to play with New Jersey again in 2001. His best season was the 1988–89 season when he put up 37 points. Albelin announced his retirement from hockey on 29 July 2004, however the Devils re-signed him in December 2005 (abbreviating his retirement after he had practiced with the team as an unsigned player for nearly half the season). He finished out his final year in 2006 playing for the Devils.

== Coaching career ==
On 25 July 2007, Albelin was hired by the New Jersey Devils as an assistant coach to head coach Brent Sutter. It was his first NHL coaching job.

On 10 August 2010, Albelin was named assistant coach of the Albany Devils, the AHL affiliate of the New Jersey Devils. On 9 September 2014, following Scott Stevens' decision to step down from a coaching position in New Jersey, Albelin was promoted to be an assistant coach under Peter DeBoer in the 2014–15 season.

On 1 July 2024, he was hired as an assistant head coach of the New York Islanders. On 29 May 2025, he was relieved of his duties.

== Career statistics ==
=== Regular season and playoffs ===
			Regular season					Playoffs
Season	Team	League	GP	G	A	Pts	PIM	GP	G	A	Pts	PIM
1979–80	Stocksunds IF	SWE III	1	0	0	0	—	—	—	—	—	—
1980–81	Stocksunds IF	SWE III	18	6	1	7	—	—	—	—	—	—
1981–82	Stocksunds IF	SWE III	22	6	2	8	—	—	—	—	—	—
1982–83	Djurgårdens IF	SEL	19	2	5	7	4	6	1	0	1	2
1983–84	Djurgårdens IF	SEL	30	9	5	14	26	4	0	1	1	2
1984–85	Djurgårdens IF	SEL	32	8	8	16	22	8	2	1	3	4
1985–86	Djurgårdens IF	SEL	35	4	8	12	26	—	—	—	—	—
1986–87	Djurgårdens IF	SEL	33	7	5	12	42	2	0	0	0	2
1987–88	Quebec Nordiques	NHL	60	3	23	26	47	—	—	—	—	—
1988–89	Quebec Nordiques	NHL	14	2	4	6	27	—	—	—	—	—
1988–89	Halifax Citadels	AHL	8	2	5	7	4	—	—	—	—	—
1988–89	New Jersey Devils	NHL	46	7	24	31	40	—	—	—	—	—
1989–90	New Jersey Devils	NHL	68	6	23	29	63	—	—	—	—	—
1990–91	Utica Devils	AHL	14	4	2	6	10	—	—	—	—	—
1990–91	New Jersey Devils	NHL	47	2	12	14	44	3	0	1	1	2
1991–92	Utica Devils	AHL	11	4	6	10	4	—	—	—	—	—
1991–92	New Jersey Devils	NHL	19	0	4	4	4	1	1	1	2	0
1992–93	New Jersey Devils	NHL	36	1	5	6	14	5	2	0	2	0
1993–94	Albany River Rats	AHL	4	0	2	2	17	—	—	—	—	—
1993–94	New Jersey Devils	NHL	62	2	17	19	36	20	2	5	7	14
1994–95	New Jersey Devils	NHL	48	5	10	15	20	20	1	7	8	2
1995–96	New Jersey Devils	NHL	53	1	12	13	14	—	—	—	—	—
1995–96	Calgary Flames	NHL	20	0	1	1	4	4	0	0	0	0
1996–97	Calgary Flames	NHL	72	4	11	15	14	—	—	—	—	—
1997–98	Calgary Flames	NHL	69	2	17	19	32	—	—	—	—	—
1998–99	Calgary Flames	NHL	60	1	5	6	8	—	—	—	—	—
1999–2000	Calgary Flames	NHL	41	4	6	10	12	—	—	—	—	—
2000–01	Calgary Flames	NHL	77	1	19	20	22	—	—	—	—	—
2001–02	New Jersey Devils	NHL	42	1	3	4	4	6	0	0	0	0
2002–03	Albany River Rats	AHL	5	0	2	2	2	—	—	—	—	—
2002–03	New Jersey Devils	NHL	37	1	6	7	6	16	1	0	1	2
2003–04	New Jersey Devils	NHL	45	1	3	4	4	4	0	1	1	0
2005–06	New Jersey Devils	NHL	36	0	6	6	2	2	0	0	0	2
SEL totals			149	30	30	60	120	20	3	2	5	10
NHL totals			952	44	211	255	417	81	7	15	22	22

=== International ===
Medal record

Men's ice hockey

Representing Sweden

World Championships
Silver medal – second place	1986 Soviet Union	
Gold medal – first place	1987 Austria	
Silver medal – second place	1997 Finland	

Year	Team	Event	GP	G	A	Pts	PIM
1983	Sweden	WJC	7	0	3	3	6
1984	Sweden	WJC	7	1	3	4	10
1985	Sweden	WC	10	1	0	1	10
1986	Sweden	WC	10	3	0	3	12
1987	Sweden	WC	10	1	5	6	12
1987	Sweden	CC	6	2	2	4	2
1989	Sweden	WC	7	0	2	2	8
1991	Sweden	CC	6	0	0	0	6
1996	Sweden	WCH	4	1	0	1	2
1997	Sweden	WC	11	1	3	4	2
1998	Sweden	OG	3	0	0	0	4
Junior totals			14	1	6	7	16
Senior totals			68	9	11	20	58

== Coaching statistics ==
Season  Team               Lge  Type        W - L - OT/SO
2007–08 New Jersey Devils  NHL  Assistant   46 - 29 - 7      
2008–09 New Jersey Devils  NHL  Assistant   32 - 16 - 3
