= 2002–03 Tampa Bay Lightning season =

National Hockey League team season

2002–03 Tampa Bay Lightning
- Southeast Division champions
- Division: 1st Southeast
- Conference: 3rd Eastern
- 2002–03 record: 36–25–16–5
- Home record: 22–9–7–3
- Road record: 14–16–9–2
- Goals for: 219
- Goals against: 210

Team information
- General manager: Jay Feaster
- Coach: John Tortorella
- Captain: Dave Andreychuk
- Alternate captains: Vincent Lecavalier; Fredrik Modin
- Arena: St. Pete Times Forum
- Average attendance: 16,545
- Minor league affiliates: Springfield Falcons; Pensacola Ice Pilots

Team leaders
- Goals: Vincent Lecavalier and Martin St. Louis (33)
- Assists: Brad Richards and Vaclav Prospal (57)
- Points: Vaclav Prospal (79)
- Penalty minutes: Andre Roy (119)
- Plus/minus: Martin St. Louis (+10)
- Wins: Nikolai Khabibulin (30)
- Goals against average: John Grahame (2.23)

The 2002–03 Tampa Bay Lightning season was the 11th National Hockey League (NHL) season in Tampa, Florida. The Lightning made it back to the Stanley Cup playoffs for the first time since 1996.

== Regular season ==
=== Final standings ===
Southeast Division
No.	CR		GP	W	L	T	OTL	GF	GA	Pts
1	3	**Tampa Bay Lightning**	82	36	25	16	5	219	210	93
2	6	**Washington Capitals**	82	39	29	8	6	224	220	92
3	11	Atlanta Thrashers	82	31	39	7	5	226	284	74
4	13	Florida Panthers	82	24	36	13	9	176	237	70
5	15	Carolina Hurricanes	82	22	43	11	6	171	240	61

Note: CR = Conference rank; GP = Games played; W = Wins; L = Losses; T = Ties; OTL = Overtime loss; GF = Goals for; GA = Goals against; Pts = Points
Bolded teams qualified for the playoffs.

Eastern Conference
R		Div	GP	W	L	T	OTL	GF	GA	Pts
**1**	**P-** Ottawa Senators	**NE**	**82**	**52**	**21**	**8**	**1**	**263**	**182**	113
**2**	**Y-** New Jersey Devils	**AT**	**82**	**46**	**20**	**10**	**6**	**216**	**166**	108
**3**	**Y-** Tampa Bay Lightning	**SE**	**82**	**36**	**25**	**16**	**5**	**219**	**210**	93
**4**	**X-** Philadelphia Flyers	**AT**	**82**	**45**	**20**	**13**	**4**	**211**	**166**	107
**5**	**X-** Toronto Maple Leafs	**NE**	**82**	**44**	**28**	**7**	**3**	**236**	**208**	98
**6**	**X-** Washington Capitals	**SE**	**82**	**39**	**29**	**8**	**6**	**224**	**220**	92
**7**	**X-** Boston Bruins	**NE**	**82**	**36**	**31**	**11**	**4**	**245**	**237**	87
**8**	**X-** New York Islanders	**AT**	**82**	**35**	**34**	**11**	**2**	**224**	**231**	83
8.5
9	New York Rangers	AT	82	32	36	10	4	210	231	78
10	Montreal Canadiens	NE	82	30	35	8	9	206	234	77
11	Atlanta Thrashers	SE	82	31	39	7	5	226	284	74
12	Buffalo Sabres	NE	82	27	37	10	8	190	219	72
13	Florida Panthers	SE	82	24	36	13	9	176	237	70
14	Pittsburgh Penguins	AT	82	27	44	6	5	189	255	65
15	Carolina Hurricanes	SE	82	22	43	11	6	171	240	61

Divisions: AT – Atlantic, NE – Northeast, SE – Southeast

P – Clinched Presidents Trophy; Y – Clinched division; X – Clinched playoff spot

== Schedule and results ==
=== Regular season ===
2002–03 regular season
October: 7–1–2–0 (home: 4–0–0–0; road: 3–1–2–0)

Game	Date	Score	Opponent	Record	Recap
1	October 10, 2002	4–3 OT	@ Florida Panthers (2002–03)	1–0–0–0	W
2	October 12, 2002	5–1	Carolina Hurricanes (2002–03)	2–0–0–0	W
3	October 18, 2002	8–5	Atlanta Thrashers (2002–03)	3–0–0–0	W
4	October 19, 2002	3–3 OT	@ Pittsburgh Penguins (2002–03)	3–0–1–0	T
5	October 21, 2002	4–2	@ New York Rangers (2002–03)	4–0–1–0	W
6	October 23, 2002	2–2 OT	@ Columbus Blue Jackets (2002–03)	4–0–2–0	T
7	October 25, 2002	3–2	Washington Capitals (2002–03)	5–0–2–0	W
8	October 26, 2002	1–5	@ New Jersey Devils (2002–03)	5–1–2–0	L
9	October 28, 2002	6–1	@ Florida Panthers (2002–03)	6–1–2–0	W
10	October 30, 2002	3–0	New York Rangers (2002–03)	7–1–2–0	W

November: 5–6–1–1 (home: 3–3–0–1; road: 2–3–1–0)

Game	Date	Score	Opponent	Record	Recap
11	November 1, 2002	2–3	@ Washington Capitals (2002–03)	7–2–2–0	L
12	November 2, 2002	3–5	@ Pittsburgh Penguins (2002–03)	7–3–2–0	L
13	November 5, 2002	3–4	@ Toronto Maple Leafs (2002–03)	7–4–2–0	L
14	November 8, 2002	4–1	Pittsburgh Penguins (2002–03)	8–4–2–0	W
15	November 9, 2002	2–3 OT	Chicago Blackhawks (2002–03)	8–4–2–1	OTL
16	November 11, 2002	4–2	Phoenix Coyotes (2002–03)	9–4–2–1	W
17	November 15, 2002	4–2	San Jose Sharks (2002–03)	10–4–2–1	W
18	November 17, 2002	2–1 OT	@ Carolina Hurricanes (2002–03)	11–4–2–1	W
19	November 19, 2002	2–3	Philadelphia Flyers (2002–03)	11–5–2–1	L
20	November 21, 2002	2–7	New York Islanders (2002–03)	11–6–2–1	L
21	November 23, 2002	3–1	@ New Jersey Devils (2002–03)	12–6–2–1	W
22	November 27, 2002	1–1 OT	@ Buffalo Sabres (2002–03)	12–6–3–1	T
23	November 29, 2002	3–5	Vancouver Canucks (2002–03)	12–7–3–1	L

December: 5–6–2–2 (home: 4–2–1–0; road: 1–4–1–2)

Game	Date	Score	Opponent	Record	Recap
24	December 1, 2002	3–4	@ New York Rangers (2002–03)	12–8–3–1	L
25	December 3, 2002	3–4 OT	@ Toronto Maple Leafs (2002–03)	12–8–3–2	OTL
26	December 5, 2002	3–2	Edmonton Oilers (2002–03)	13–8–3–2	W
27	December 7, 2002	2–3 OT	@ Boston Bruins (2002–03)	13–8–3–3	OTL
28	December 8, 2002	1–3	@ Chicago Blackhawks (2002–03)	13–9–3–3	L
29	December 10, 2002	3–5	@ Minnesota Wild (2002–03)	13–10–3–3	L
30	December 12, 2002	3–2	@ Montreal Canadiens (2002–03)	14–10–3–3	W
31	December 14, 2002	4–3	New York Islanders (2002–03)	15–10–3–3	W
32	December 18, 2002	1–1 OT	@ Carolina Hurricanes (2002–03)	15–10–4–3	T
33	December 19, 2002	1–2	Toronto Maple Leafs (2002–03)	15–11–4–3	L
34	December 21, 2002	2–2 OT	Nashville Predators (2002–03)	15–11–5–3	T
35	December 23, 2002	0–3	@ Washington Capitals (2002–03)	15–12–5–3	L
36	December 27, 2002	5–2	Boston Bruins (2002–03)	16–12–5–3	W
37	December 29, 2002	5–3	New York Rangers (2002–03)	17–12–5–3	W
38	December 31, 2002	3–6	Ottawa Senators (2002–03)	17–13–5–3	L

January: 5–6–2–1 (home: 3–1–2–1; road: 2–5–0–0)

Game	Date	Score	Opponent	Record	Recap
39	January 2, 2003	1–4	@ Calgary Flames (2002–03)	17–14–5–3	L
40	January 4, 2003	1–5	@ St. Louis Blues (2002–03)	17–15–5–3	L
41	January 7, 2003	1–0	Detroit Red Wings (2002–03)	18–15–5–3	W
42	January 9, 2003	2–3 OT	Atlanta Thrashers (2002–03)	18–15–5–4	OTL
43	January 11, 2003	3–3 OT	New Jersey Devils (2002–03)	18–15–6–4	T
44	January 14, 2003	0–7	@ Ottawa Senators (2002–03)	18–16–6–4	L
45	January 17, 2003	2–3	Pittsburgh Penguins (2002–03)	18–17–6–4	L
46	January 18, 2003	2–3	@ Philadelphia Flyers (2002–03)	18–18–6–4	L
47	January 20, 2003	6–2	Ottawa Senators (2002–03)	19–18–6–4	W
48	January 22, 2003	2–2 OT	Montreal Canadiens (2002–03)	19–18–7–4	T
49	January 24, 2003	4–1	@ Dallas Stars (2002–03)	20–18–7–4	W
50	January 25, 2003	2–3	@ Nashville Predators (2002–03)	20–19–7–4	L
51	January 28, 2003	3–0	@ Philadelphia Flyers (2002–03)	21–19–7–4	W
52	January 30, 2003	3–1	Carolina Hurricanes (2002–03)	22–19–7–4	W

February: 5–3–3–1 (home: 5–2–0–1; road: 0–1–3–0)

Game	Date	Score	Opponent	Record	Recap
53	February 4, 2003	1–5	Washington Capitals (2002–03)	22–20–7–4	L
54	February 6, 2003	2–3 OT	Toronto Maple Leafs (2002–03)	22–20–7–5	OTL
55	February 8, 2003	4–4 OT	@ Florida Panthers (2002–03)	22–20–8–5	T
56	February 11, 2003	2–6	@ New York Islanders (2002–03)	22–21–8–5	L
57	February 14, 2003	2–2 OT	@ Atlanta Thrashers (2002–03)	22–21–9–5	T
58	February 15, 2003	5–2	Boston Bruins (2002–03)	23–21–9–5	W
59	February 17, 2003	3–1	Washington Capitals (2002–03)	24–21–9–5	W
60	February 19, 2003	2–0	Atlanta Thrashers (2002–03)	25–21–9–5	W
61	February 21, 2003	2–2 OT	@ Carolina Hurricanes (2002–03)	25–21–10–5	T
62	February 23, 2003	1–4	Buffalo Sabres (2002–03)	25–22–10–5	L
63	February 25, 2003	2–0	Mighty Ducks of Anaheim (2002–03)	26–22–10–5	W
64	February 27, 2003	3–1	Florida Panthers (2002–03)	27–22–10–5	W

March: 8–1–6–0 (home: 2–0–4–0; road: 6–1–2–0)

Game	Date	Score	Opponent	Record	Recap
65	March 1, 2003	2–1	@ Ottawa Senators (2002–03)	28–22–10–5	W
66	March 4, 2003	3–1	@ New York Islanders (2002–03)	29–22–10–5	W
67	March 5, 2003	2–3	@ Detroit Red Wings (2002–03)	29–23–10–5	L
68	March 7, 2003	4–3	Colorado Avalanche (2002–03)	30–23–10–5	W
69	March 9, 2003	1–1 OT	Buffalo Sabres (2002–03)	30–23–11–5	T
70	March 12, 2003	4–2	Los Angeles Kings (2002–03)	31–23–11–5	W
71	March 14, 2003	4–2	@ Buffalo Sabres (2002–03)	32–23–11–5	W
72	March 15, 2003	2–1	@ Montreal Canadiens (2002–03)	33–23–11–5	W
73	March 17, 2003	3–3 OT	Minnesota Wild (2002–03)	33–23–12–5	T
74	March 20, 2003	2–2 OT	@ Los Angeles Kings (2002–03)	33–23–13–5	T
75	March 22, 2003	4–0	@ Phoenix Coyotes (2002–03)	34–23–13–5	W
76	March 24, 2003	4–1	@ San Jose Sharks (2002–03)	35–23–13–5	W
77	March 27, 2003	2–2 OT	New Jersey Devils (2002–03)	35–23–14–5	T
78	March 29, 2003	1–1 OT	Florida Panthers (2002–03)	35–23–15–5	T
79	March 31, 2003	2–2 OT	@ Boston Bruins (2002–03)	35–23–16–5	T

April: 1–2–0–0 (home: 1–1–0–0; road: 0–1–0–0)

Game	Date	Score	Opponent	Record	Recap
80	April 2, 2003	2–1	Montreal Canadiens (2002–03)	36–23–16–5	W
81	April 4, 2003	1–4	Philadelphia Flyers (2002–03)	36–24–16–5	L
82	April 6, 2003	2–6	@ Atlanta Thrashers (2002–03)	36–25–16–5	L

Lightning score listed first;

Legend: W Win (2 points) L Loss (0 points) T Tie (1 point) OTL Overtime loss (1 point)

=== Playoffs ===
2003 Stanley Cup playoffs
Eastern Conference Quarterfinals vs. Washington Capitals (6) – Lightning win 4–2

Game	Date	Score	Opponent	Series	Recap
1	April 10, 2003	0–3	Washington Capitals	Capitals lead 1–0	L
2	April 12, 2003	3–6	Washington Capitals	Capitals lead 2–0	L
3	April 15, 2003	4–3 OT	@ Washington Capitals	Capitals lead 2–1	W
4	April 16, 2003	3–1	@ Washington Capitals	Series tied 2–2	W
5	April 18, 2003	2–1	Washington Capitals	Lightning lead 3–2	W
6	April 20, 2003	2–1 3OT	@ Washington Capitals	Lightning win 4–2	W

Eastern Conference Semifinals vs. New Jersey Devils (2) – Devils win 4–1

Game	Date	Score	Opponent	Series	Recap
1	April 24, 2003	0–3	@ New Jersey Devils	Devils lead 1–0	L
2	April 26, 2003	2–3 OT	@ New Jersey Devils	Devils lead 2–0	L
3	April 28, 2003	4–3	New Jersey Devils	Devils lead 2–1	W
4	April 30, 2003	1–3	New Jersey Devils	Devils lead 3–1	L
5	May 2, 2003	1–2 3OT	@ New Jersey Devils	Devils win 4–1	L

Lightning score listed first;

Legend: W Win L Loss

== Player statistics ==
=== Scoring ===
- Position abbreviations: C = Center; D = Defense; G = Goaltender; LW = Left wing; RW = Right wing
- † = Joined team via a transaction (e.g., trade, waivers, signing) during the season. Stats reflect time with the Lightning only.
- ‡ = Left team via a transaction (e.g., trade, waivers, release) during the season. Stats reflect time with the Lightning only.

No.	Player	Pos	Regular season						Playoffs					
No.	Player	Pos	GP	G	A	Pts	+/-	PIM	GP	G	A	Pts	+/-	PIM
20	Vaclav Prospal	C	80	22	57	79	9	53	11	4	2	6	−3	8
4	Vincent Lecavalier	C	80	33	45	78	0	39	11	3	3	6	−2	22
19	Brad Richards	C	80	17	57	74	3	24	11	0	5	5	−3	12
26	Martin St. Louis	RW	82	33	37	70	10	32	11	7	5	12	5	0
22	Dan Boyle	D	77	13	40	53	9	44	11	0	7	7	0	6
33	Fredrik Modin	LW	76	17	23	40	7	43	11	2	0	2	2	18
25	Dave Andreychuk	LW	72	20	14	34	−12	34	11	3	3	6	−1	10
17	Ruslan Fedotenko	LW	76	19	13	32	−7	44	11	0	1	1	−6	2
13	Pavel Kubina	D	75	3	19	22	−7	78	11	0	0	0	−4	12
7	Ben Clymer	RW	65	6	12	18	−2	57	11	0	2	2	−2	6
36	Andre Roy	RW	62	10	7	17	0	119	5	0	1	1	0	2
37	Brad Lukowich	D	70	1	14	15	4	46	9	0	1	1	−2	2
21	Cory Sarich	D	82	5	9	14	−3	63	11	0	2	2	2	6
27	Tim Taylor	C	82	4	8	12	−13	38	11	0	1	1	1	6
16	Alexander Svitov	C	63	4	4	8	−4	58	7	0	0	0	−2	6
44	Nolan Pratt	D	67	1	7	8	−6	35	4	0	1	1	−1	0
28	Sheldon Keefe	RW	37	2	5	7	−1	24	—	—	—	—	—	—
15	Nikita Alexeev	RW	37	4	2	6	−6	8	11	1	0	1	−3	0
2	Stan Neckar	D	70	1	4	5	−6	43	7	0	2	2	0	2
5	Jassen Cullimore	D	28	1	3	4	3	31	11	1	1	2	−2	4
11	Chris Dingman	LW	51	2	1	3	−11	91	10	1	0	1	1	4
35	Nikolai Khabibulin	G	65	0	3	3		8	10	0	0	0		0
18	Jimmie Olvestad	LW	37	0	3	3	−2	16	—	—	—	—	—	—
23	Janne Laukkanen†	D	2	1	0	1	1	0	2	0	0	0	1	2
9	Brian Holzinger‡	C	5	0	1	1	1	2	—	—	—	—	—	—
3	Marc Bergevin†	D	1	0	0	0	−2	0	—	—	—	—	—	—
47	John Grahame†	G	17	0	0	0		9	1	0	0	0		0
30	Kevin Hodson‡	G	7	0	0	0		2	—	—	—	—	—	—
1	Evgeny Konstantinov	G	1	0	0	0		2	—	—	—	—	—	—
38	Darren Rumble	D	19	0	0	0	−2	6	—	—	—	—	—	—

=== Goaltending ===
No.	Player	Regular season										Playoffs								
No.	Player	GP	W	L	T	SA	GA	GAA	SV%	SO	TOI	GP	W	L	SA	GA	GAA	SV%	SO	TOI
35	Nikolai Khabibulin	65	30	22	11	1760	156	2.47	.911	4	3787	10	5	5	299	26	2.42	.913	0	644
47	John Grahame†	17	6	5	4	424	34	2.23	.920	2	914	1	0	1	48	2	1.08	.958	0	111
30	Kevin Hodson‡	7	0	3	1	101	12	2.54	.881	0	283	—	—	—	—	—	—	—	—	—
1	Evgeny Konstantinov	1	0	0	0	6	1	3.00	.833	0	20	—	—	—	—	—	—	—	—	—

== Awards and records ==
=== Awards ===
Type	Award/honor	Recipient	Ref
League (in-season)	NHL All-Star Game selection	Nikolai Khabibulin (Note: Khabibulin was voted to the starting lineup.)	
League (in-season)	NHL All-Star Game selection	Vincent Lecavalier (Note: Lecavalier was an injury replacement for Mario Lemieux of the Pittsburgh Penguins.)	
League (in-season)	NHL All-Star Game selection	Martin St. Louis	
League (in-season)	NHL Player of the Month	Nikolai Khabibulin (March)	
League (in-season)	NHL Player of the Week	Nikolai Khabibulin (November 18)	
League (in-season)	NHL Player of the Week	Nikolai Khabibulin (March 3)	
League (in-season)	NHL Player of the Week	Vaclav Prospal (March 17)	
League (in-season)	NHL YoungStars Game selection	Alexander Svitov	

=== Milestones ===
Milestone	Player	Date	Ref
First game	Alexander Svitov	October 10, 2002	

== Transactions ==
The Lightning were involved in the following transactions from June 14, 2002, the day after the deciding game of the 2002 Stanley Cup Finals, through June 9, 2003, the day of the deciding game of the 2003 Stanley Cup Finals.

=== Trades ===
Date	Details		Ref
June 21, 2002	To Tampa Bay Lightning: Ruslan Fedotenko; Tampa Bay’s 2nd-round pick in 2002; Phoenix’s 2nd-round pick in 2002	To Philadelphia Flyers: 1st-round pick in 2002	
June 22, 2002	To Tampa Bay Lightning: Brad Lukowich; 7th-round pick in 2003	To Dallas Stars: 2nd-round pick in 2002	
June 22, 2002	To Tampa Bay Lightning: 2nd-round pick in 2002; 5th-round pick in 2002	To San Jose Sharks: Phoenix’s 2nd-round pick in 2002	
June 23, 2002	To Tampa Bay Lightning: 6th-round pick in 2002; 8th-round pick in 2002; Philadelphia’s 8th-round pick in 2002; 9th-round pick in 2002	To Carolina Hurricanes: 4th-round pick in 2003	
June 23, 2002	To Tampa Bay Lightning: 7th-round pick in 2002	To Ottawa Senators: Josef Boumedienne	
October 10, 2002	To Tampa Bay Lightning: Boyd Kane	To New York Rangers: Gordie Dwyer	
January 13, 2003	To Tampa Bay Lightning: John Grahame	To Boston Bruins: 4th-round pick in 2004	
March 11, 2003	To Tampa Bay Lightning: Marc Bergevin	To Pittsburgh Penguins: Brian Holzinger	
May 12, 2003	To Tampa Bay Lightning: 9th-round pick in 2003	To Pittsburgh Penguins: Marc Bergevin	

=== Players acquired ===
Date	Player	Former team	Term	Via	Ref
September 11, 2002	Darren Rumble	Worcester IceCats (AHL)	1-year	Free agency	
January 23, 2003	Corey Foster	Springfield Falcons (AHL)		Free agency	
March 11, 2003	Janne Laukkanen	New York Rangers		Waivers	

=== Players lost ===
Date	Player	New team	Via (Note: In parentheses is the player's free agency group on July 1 if applicable.)	Ref
August 5, 2002	Dieter Kochan	Minnesota Wild	Free agency (VI)	
N/A	Kyle Kos	Arkansas RiverBlades (ECHL)	Free agency (UFA)	
N/A	Gaetan Royer	San Antonio Rampage (AHL)	Free agency (UFA)	
October 4, 2002	Mathieu Biron	Columbus Blue Jackets	Waiver draft	
October 20, 2002	Grant Ledyard		Retirement (III)	
January 16, 2003	Kevin Hodson		Retirement	

=== Signings ===
Date	Player	Term	Contract type	Ref
June 17, 2002	Alexander Svitov	3-year	Entry-level	
June 25, 2002	Dave Andreychuk	1-year	Option exercised	
July 16, 2002	Fredrik Modin	1-year	Re-signing	
July 22, 2002	Pavel Kubina	multi-year	Re-signing	
July 26, 2002	Mathieu Biron	1-year	Re-signing	
July 27, 2002	Shane Willis	1-year	Re-signing	
July 30, 2002	Chris Dingman	multi-year	Re-signing	
August 1, 2002	Ben Clymer	1-year	Re-signing	
August 1, 2002	Andre Roy	1-year	Re-signing	
August 6, 2002	Dan Boyle	1-year	Re-signing	
August 7, 2002	Mike Jones	1-year	Re-signing	
August 13, 2002	Vaclav Prospal	1-year	Re-signing	
August 15, 2002	Gordie Dwyer	1-year	Re-signing	
August 15, 2002	Ruslan Fedotenko	2-year	Re-signing	
May 14, 2003	Tim Taylor	multi-year	Extension	
May 30, 2003	Jean-Francois Soucy	3-year	Entry-level	
June 4, 2003	Eero Somervuori	1-year	Entry-level	

== Draft picks ==
Tampa Bay's draft picks at the 2002 NHL entry draft held at the Air Canada Centre in Toronto, Ontario.

Round	#	Player	Nationality	College/Junior/Club team (League)
2	60	Adam Henrich	Canada	Brampton Battalion (OHL)
4	100	Dmitri Kazionov	Russia	CSKA Moscow Jr. (Russia)
5	135	Joseph Pearce	United States	New Hampshire Jr. Monarchs (EJHL)
5	162	Gerard Dicaire	Canada	Kootenay Ice (WHL)
6	170	P. J. Atherton	United States	Cedar Rapids RoughRiders (USHL)
6	174	Karri Akkanen	Finland	Ilves Jrs. (Finland)
6	183	Paul Ranger	Canada	Oshawa Generals (OHL)
7	213	Fredrik Norrena	Finland	TPS (Finland)
8	233	Vasily Koshechkin	Russia	Lada Togliatti (Russia)
8	255	Ryan Craig	Canada	Brandon Wheat Kings (WHL)
8	256	Darren Reid	Canada	Medicine Hat Tigers (WHL)
9	286	Alexei Glukhov	Russia	Khimik Voskresensk Jr. (Russia)
9	287	John Toffey	United States	Ohio State University (CCHA)

== See also ==
- 2002–03 NHL season
