= 2002–03 New York Islanders season =

NHL hockey team season

2002–03 New York Islanders
- Division: 3rd Atlantic
- Conference: 8th Eastern
- 2002–03 record: 35–34–11–2
- Home record: 18–18–5–0
- Road record: 17–16–6–2
- Goals for: 224
- Goals against: 231

Team information
- General manager: Mike Milbury
- Coach: Peter Laviolette
- Captain: Michael Peca
- Alternate captains: Adrian Aucoin; Kenny Jonsson; Alexei Yashin
- Arena: Nassau Veterans Memorial Coliseum
- Average attendance: 14,930 (92.0%)
- Minor league affiliates: Bridgeport Sound Tigers; Trenton Titans

Team leaders
- Goals: Dave Scatchard (27)
- Assists: Alexei Yashin (39)
- Points: Alexei Yashin (65)
- Penalty minutes: Eric Cairns (124)
- Plus/minus: Roman Hamrlik (+21)
- Wins: Chris Osgood (17)
- Goals against average: Garth Snow (2.31)

The 2002–03 New York Islanders season was the 31st season in the franchise's history.

== Regular season ==
=== Final standings ===
Atlantic Division
No.	CR		GP	W	L	T	OTL	GF	GA	Pts
1	2	**New Jersey Devils**	82	46	20	10	6	216	166	108
2	4	**Philadelphia Flyers**	82	45	20	13	4	211	166	107
3	8	**New York Islanders**	82	35	34	11	2	224	231	83
4	9	New York Rangers	82	32	36	10	4	210	231	78
5	14	Pittsburgh Penguins	82	27	44	6	5	189	255	65

Note: CR = Conference rank; GP = Games played; W = Wins; L = Losses; T = Ties; OTL = Overtime loss; GF = Goals for; GA = Goals against; Pts = Points
Bolded teams qualified for the playoffs.

Eastern Conference
R		Div	GP	W	L	T	OTL	GF	GA	Pts
**1**	**P-** Ottawa Senators	**NE**	**82**	**52**	**21**	**8**	**1**	**263**	**182**	113
**2**	**Y-** New Jersey Devils	**AT**	**82**	**46**	**20**	**10**	**6**	**216**	**166**	108
**3**	**Y-** Tampa Bay Lightning	**SE**	**82**	**36**	**25**	**16**	**5**	**219**	**210**	93
**4**	**X-** Philadelphia Flyers	**AT**	**82**	**45**	**20**	**13**	**4**	**211**	**166**	107
**5**	**X-** Toronto Maple Leafs	**NE**	**82**	**44**	**28**	**7**	**3**	**236**	**208**	98
**6**	**X-** Washington Capitals	**SE**	**82**	**39**	**29**	**8**	**6**	**224**	**220**	92
**7**	**X-** Boston Bruins	**NE**	**82**	**36**	**31**	**11**	**4**	**245**	**237**	87
**8**	**X-** New York Islanders	**AT**	**82**	**35**	**34**	**11**	**2**	**224**	**231**	83
8.5
9	New York Rangers	AT	82	32	36	10	4	210	231	78
10	Montreal Canadiens	NE	82	30	35	8	9	206	234	77
11	Atlanta Thrashers	SE	82	31	39	7	5	226	284	74
12	Buffalo Sabres	NE	82	27	37	10	8	190	219	72
13	Florida Panthers	SE	82	24	36	13	9	176	237	70
14	Pittsburgh Penguins	AT	82	27	44	6	5	189	255	65
15	Carolina Hurricanes	SE	82	22	43	11	6	171	240	61

Divisions: AT – Atlantic, NE – Northeast, SE – Southeast

P – Clinched Presidents Trophy; Y – Clinched division; X – Clinched playoff spot

== Playoffs ==
The Islanders lost in the first round to the Ottawa Senators 4–1.

== Schedule and results ==
=== Regular season ===
2002–03 regular season
October: 3–6–1–0 (home: 2–4–0–0; road: 1–2–1–0)

Game	Date	Score	Opponent	Record	Recap
1	October 10, 2002	1–5	@ Buffalo Sabres (2002–03)	0–1–0–0	L
2	October 12, 2002	1–2	Washington Capitals (2002–03)	0–2–0–0	L
3	October 15, 2002	4–3 OT	Nashville Predators (2002–03)	1–2–0–0	W
4	October 17, 2002	3–3 OT	@ Philadelphia Flyers (2002–03)	1–2–1–0	T
5	October 19, 2002	5–4	@ Atlanta Thrashers (2002–03)	2–2–1–0	W
6	October 22, 2002	1–4	Carolina Hurricanes (2002–03)	2–3–1–0	L
7	October 24, 2002	5–3	Florida Panthers (2002–03)	3–3–1–0	W
8	October 26, 2002	2–6	Philadelphia Flyers (2002–03)	3–4–1–0	L
9	October 29, 2002	2–3	Phoenix Coyotes (2002–03)	3–5–1–0	L
10	October 30, 2002	2–4	@ Carolina Hurricanes (2002–03)	3–6–1–0	L

November: 5–7–2–0 (home: 2–4–1–0; road: 3–3–1–0)

Game	Date	Score	Opponent	Record	Recap
11	November 2, 2002	1–6	St. Louis Blues (2002–03)	3–7–1–0	L
12	November 4, 2002	2–4	Calgary Flames (2002–03)	3–8–1–0	L
13	November 7, 2002	0–3	@ Montreal Canadiens (2002–03)	3–9–1–0	L
14	November 8, 2002	4–2	Edmonton Oilers (2002–03)	4–9–1–0	W
15	November 10, 2002	3–2	Dallas Stars (2002–03)	5–9–1–0	W
16	November 12, 2002	3–5	Ottawa Senators (2002–03)	5–10–1–0	L
17	November 14, 2002	1–4	@ Boston Bruins (2002–03)	5–11–1–0	L
18	November 16, 2002	3–2	@ Pittsburgh Penguins (2002–03)	6–11–1–0	W
19	November 20, 2002	3–3 OT	@ Florida Panthers (2002–03)	6–11–2–0	T
20	November 21, 2002	7–2	@ Tampa Bay Lightning (2002–03)	7–11–2–0	W
21	November 23, 2002	3–1	@ New York Rangers (2002–03)	8–11–2–0	W
22	November 27, 2002	2–2 OT	Ottawa Senators (2002–03)	8–11–3–0	T
23	November 29, 2002	2–4	Columbus Blue Jackets (2002–03)	8–12–3–0	L
24	November 30, 2002	2–4	@ Ottawa Senators (2002–03)	8–13–3–0	L

December: 8–3–2–0 (home: 5–2–1–0; road: 3–1–1–0)

Game	Date	Score	Opponent	Record	Recap
25	December 3, 2002	2–1	Vancouver Canucks (2002–03)	9–13–3–0	W
26	December 6, 2002	4–2	Toronto Maple Leafs (2002–03)	10–13–3–0	W
27	December 7, 2002	6–3	@ Pittsburgh Penguins (2002–03)	11–13–3–0	W
28	December 10, 2002	2–3	Chicago Blackhawks (2002–03)	11–14–3–0	L
29	December 13, 2002	3–3 OT	@ Florida Panthers (2002–03)	11–14–4–0	T
30	December 14, 2002	3–4	@ Tampa Bay Lightning (2002–03)	11–15–4–0	L
31	December 17, 2002	2–2 OT	Detroit Red Wings (2002–03)	11–15–5–0	T
32	December 19, 2002	4–2	@ Minnesota Wild (2002–03)	12–15–5–0	W
33	December 21, 2002	1–3	Washington Capitals (2002–03)	12–16–5–0	L
34	December 23, 2002	3–1	Montreal Canadiens (2002–03)	13–16–5–0	W
35	December 28, 2002	3–0	Carolina Hurricanes (2002–03)	14–16–5–0	W
36	December 30, 2002	2–1 OT	Florida Panthers (2002–03)	15–16–5–0	W
37	December 31, 2002	1–0 OT	@ Buffalo Sabres (2002–03)	16–16–5–0	W

January: 8–4–0–2 (home: 5–2–0–0; road: 3–2–0–2)

Game	Date	Score	Opponent	Record	Recap
38	January 3, 2003	8–4	Boston Bruins (2002–03)	17–16–5–0	W
39	January 4, 2003	2–3 OT	@ Pittsburgh Penguins (2002–03)	17–16–5–1	OTL
40	January 7, 2003	6–3	Pittsburgh Penguins (2002–03)	18–16–5–1	W
41	January 9, 2003	0–4	Philadelphia Flyers (2002–03)	18–17–5–1	L
42	January 11, 2003	7–3	Atlanta Thrashers (2002–03)	19–17–5–1	W
43	January 13, 2003	3–4 OT	@ Washington Capitals (2002–03)	19–17–5–2	OTL
44	January 15, 2003	0–5	@ New Jersey Devils (2002–03)	19–18–5–2	L
45	January 16, 2003	3–2 OT	@ St. Louis Blues (2002–03)	20–18–5–2	W
46	January 19, 2003	4–1	@ Atlanta Thrashers (2002–03)	21–18–5–2	W
47	January 21, 2003	0–5	New York Rangers (2002–03)	21–19–5–2	L
48	January 24, 2003	3–1	@ Philadelphia Flyers (2002–03)	22–19–5–2	W
49	January 25, 2003	1–4	@ Columbus Blue Jackets (2002–03)	22–20–5–2	L
50	January 28, 2003	5–2	Pittsburgh Penguins (2002–03)	23–20–5–2	W
51	January 30, 2003	3–1	Montreal Canadiens (2002–03)	24–20–5–2	W

February: 5–4–3–0 (home: 3–1–2–0; road: 2–3–1–0)

Game	Date	Score	Opponent	Record	Recap
52	February 4, 2003	1–2	Philadelphia Flyers (2002–03)	24–21–5–2	L
53	February 7, 2003	0–3	@ Washington Capitals (2002–03)	24–22–5–2	L
54	February 8, 2003	3–1	Buffalo Sabres (2002–03)	25–22–5–2	W
55	February 11, 2003	6–2	Tampa Bay Lightning (2002–03)	26–22–5–2	W
56	February 13, 2003	0–2	@ Nashville Predators (2002–03)	26–23–5–2	L
57	February 15, 2003	3–2	@ Los Angeles Kings (2002–03)	27–23–5–2	W
58	February 17, 2003	2–2 OT	@ Mighty Ducks of Anaheim (2002–03)	27–23–6–2	T
59	February 19, 2003	3–0	@ San Jose Sharks (2002–03)	28–23–6–2	W
60	February 21, 2003	4–1	Colorado Avalanche (2002–03)	29–23–6–2	W
61	February 23, 2003	4–4 OT	Boston Bruins (2002–03)	29–23–7–2	T
62	February 25, 2003	2–5	@ Toronto Maple Leafs (2002–03)	29–24–7–2	L
63	February 27, 2003	3–3 OT	New Jersey Devils (2002–03)	29–24–8–2	T

March: 5–8–2–0 (home: 1–4–0–0; road: 4–4–2–0)

Game	Date	Score	Opponent	Record	Recap
64	March 1, 2003	2–1 OT	Buffalo Sabres (2002–03)	30–24–8–2	W
65	March 3, 2003	1–1 OT	@ New York Rangers (2002–03)	30–24–9–2	T
66	March 4, 2003	1–3	Tampa Bay Lightning (2002–03)	30–25–9–2	L
67	March 6, 2003	1–4	@ Boston Bruins (2002–03)	30–26–9–2	L
68	March 8, 2003	2–4	New Jersey Devils (2002–03)	30–27–9–2	L
69	March 11, 2003	3–4	@ Vancouver Canucks (2002–03)	30–28–9–2	L
70	March 13, 2003	5–2	@ Edmonton Oilers (2002–03)	31–28–9–2	W
71	March 15, 2003	5–2	@ Ottawa Senators (2002–03)	32–28–9–2	W
72	March 17, 2003	0–1	@ New York Rangers (2002–03)	32–29–9–2	L
73	March 18, 2003	3–3 OT	@ Toronto Maple Leafs (2002–03)	32–29–10–2	T
74	March 20, 2003	6–3	@ Montreal Canadiens (2002–03)	33–29–10–2	W
75	March 22, 2003	2–4	New Jersey Devils (2002–03)	33–30–10–2	L
76	March 25, 2003	9–2	@ Chicago Blackhawks (2002–03)	34–30–10–2	W
77	March 28, 2003	2–5	Toronto Maple Leafs (2002–03)	34–31–10–2	L
78	March 30, 2003	0–6	@ New Jersey Devils (2002–03)	34–32–10–2	L

April: 1–2–1–0 (home: 0–1–1–0; road: 1–1–0–0)

Game	Date	Score	Opponent	Record	Recap
79	April 1, 2003	2–2 OT	New York Rangers (2002–03)	34–32–11–2	T
80	April 3, 2003	2–5	@ Detroit Red Wings (2002–03)	34–33–11–2	L
81	April 5, 2003	2–3	Atlanta Thrashers (2002–03)	34–34–11–2	L
82	April 6, 2003	2–1	@ Carolina Hurricanes (2002–03)	35–34–11–2	W

Legend: W Win (2 points) L Loss (0 points) T Tie (1 point) OTL Overtime loss (1 point)

=== Playoffs ===
2003 Stanley Cup playoffs
Eastern Conference Quarterfinals vs. (1) Ottawa Senators – Senators win 4–1

Game	Date	Score	Opponent	Series	Recap
1	April 9, 2003	3–0	@ Ottawa Senators	Islanders lead 1–0	W
2	April 12, 2003	0–3	@ Ottawa Senators	Series tied 1–1	L
3	April 14, 2003	2–3 2OT	Ottawa Senators	Senators lead 2–1	L
4	April 16, 2003	1–3	Ottawa Senators	Senators lead 3–1	L
5	April 17, 2003	1–4	@ Ottawa Senators	Senators win 4–1	L

Legend: W Win L Loss

== Player statistics ==
=== Scoring ===
- Position abbreviations: C = Center; D = Defense; G = Goaltender; LW = Left wing; RW = Right wing
- † = Joined team via a transaction (e.g., trade, waivers, signing) during the season. Stats reflect time with the Islanders only.
- ‡ = Left team via a transaction (e.g., trade, waivers, release) during the season. Stats reflect time with the Islanders only.

No.	Player	Pos	Regular season						Playoffs					
No.	Player	Pos	GP	G	A	Pts	+/-	PIM	GP	G	A	Pts	+/-	PIM
79	Alexei Yashin	C	81	26	39	65	−12	32	5	2	2	4	−1	2
55	Jason Blake	C	81	25	30	55	16	58	5	0	1	1	−2	2
37	Mark Parrish	RW	81	23	25	48	−11	28	5	1	0	1	−1	4
38	Dave Scatchard	C	81	27	18	45	9	108	5	1	0	1	−3	6
17	Shawn Bates	C	74	13	29	42	−9	52	5	1	0	1	−2	0
27	Michael Peca	C	66	13	29	42	−4	43	5	0	0	0	−1	4
4	Roman Hamrlik	D	73	9	32	41	21	87	5	0	2	2	−2	2
3	Adrian Aucoin	D	73	8	27	35	−5	70	5	1	2	3	−1	4
45	Arron Asham	RW	78	15	19	34	1	57	5	0	0	0	−1	16
28	Jason Wiemer	C	81	9	19	28	5	116	5	0	0	0	−3	23
12	Oleg Kvasha	LW	69	12	14	26	4	44	5	0	1	1	−1	2
29	Kenny Jonsson	D	71	8	18	26	−8	24	5	0	1	1	−2	0
15	Brad Isbister‡	LW	53	10	13	23	−9	34	—	—	—	—	—	—
11	Mattias Weinhandl	RW	47	6	17	23	−2	10	—	—	—	—	—	—
2	Mattias Timander	D	80	3	13	16	−2	24	1	0	0	0	1	0
24	Radek Martinek	D	66	2	11	13	15	26	4	0	0	0	−1	4
13	Claude Lapointe‡	C	66	6	6	12	−3	20	—	—	—	—	—	—
44	Janne Niinimaa†	D	13	1	5	6	−2	14	5	0	1	1	−4	12
33	Eric Cairns	D	60	1	4	5	−7	124	5	0	0	0	−1	13
16	Raffi Torres‡	LW	17	0	5	5	0	10	—	—	—	—	—	—
26	Justin Mapletoft	C	11	2	2	4	−1	2	2	0	0	0	0	0
44 (Note: Butenschon wore number 64 in his first two games.)	Sven Butenschon†	D	37	0	4	4	−6	26	—	—	—	—	—	—
21	Trent Hunter	RW	8	0	4	4	5	4	—	—	—	—	—	—
10	Eric Manlow	C	8	2	1	3	2	4	—	—	—	—	—	—
16	Justin Papineau†	C	5	1	2	3	1	4	1	0	0	0	0	0
25	Randy Robitaille†	C	10	1	2	3	0	2	5	1	1	2	−1	0
20	Steve Webb	RW	49	1	0	1	−5	75	5	0	0	0	−2	10
39	Rick DiPietro	G	10	0	0	0		2	1	0	0	0		0
49	Eric Godard	RW	19	0	0	0	−3	48	2	0	1	1	1	4
32	Alan Letang	D	4	0	0	0	−1	0	—	—	—	—	—	—
59	Alain Nasreddine	D	3	0	0	0	0	2	—	—	—	—	—	—
35	Chris Osgood‡	G	37	0	0	0		12	—	—	—	—	—	—
8	Tomi Pettinen	D	2	0	0	0	1	0	—	—	—	—	—	—
36 (Note: Schultz wore number 39 in his first three games.)	Ray Schultz	D	4	0	0	0	−1	28	—	—	—	—	—	—
6	Brandon Smith	D	3	0	0	0	−2	0	—	—	—	—	—	—
30	Garth Snow	G	43	0	0	0		24	5	0	0	0		0

=== Goaltending ===
- ‡ = Left team via a transaction (e.g., trade, waivers, release) during the season. Stats reflect time with the Islanders only.

No.	Player	Regular season										Playoffs								
No.	Player	GP	W	L	T	SA	GA	GAA	SV%	SO	TOI	GP	W	L	SA	GA	GAA	SV%	SO	TOI
35	Chris Osgood‡	37	17	14	4	912	97	2.92	.894	2	1993	—	—	—	—	—	—	—	—	—
30	Garth Snow	43	16	17	5	1120	92	2.31	.918	1	2390	5	1	4	134	12	2.36	.910	1	305
39	Rick DiPietro	10	2	5	2	273	29	2.97	.894	0	585	1	0	0	3	0	0.00	1.000	0	15

== Awards and records ==
=== Awards ===
Type	Award/honor	Recipient	Ref
League (in-season)	NHL All-Star Game selection	Roman Hamrlik	
League (in-season)	NHL YoungStars Game selection	Mattias Weinhandl	
Team	Bob Nystrom Award	Jason Blake	
Team	Bob Nystrom Award	Garth Snow	

=== Milestones ===
Milestone	Player	Date	Ref
First game	Tomi Pettinen	October 12, 2002	
First game	Justin Mapletoft	October 15, 2002	
First game	Eric Godard	October 17, 2002	
First game	Mattias Weinhandl	November 4, 2002	

== Transactions ==
The Islanders were involved in the following transactions from June 14, 2002, the day after the deciding game of the 2002 Stanley Cup Finals, through June 9, 2003, the day of the deciding game of the 2003 Stanley Cup Finals.

=== Trades ===
Date	Details		Ref
June 22, 2002	To New York Islanders: Arron Asham; 5th-round pick in 2002	To Montreal Canadiens: Mariusz Czerkawski	
June 22, 2002	To New York Islanders: Eric Godard	To Florida Panthers: Florida's 3rd-round pick in 2002	
June 22, 2002	To New York Islanders: Mattias Timander	To Columbus Blue Jackets: 4th-round pick in 2002	
July 3, 2002	To New York Islanders: Jason Wiemer	To Florida Panthers: Branislav Mezei	
October 11, 2002	To New York Islanders: Sven Butenschon	To Florida Panthers: Juraj Kolnik; 9th-round pick in 2003	
March 9, 2003	To New York Islanders: Randy Robitaille	To Pittsburgh Penguins: 5th-round pick in 2003	
March 9, 2003	To New York Islanders: 5th-round pick in 2003	To Philadelphia Flyers: Claude Lapointe	
March 11, 2003	To New York Islanders: Justin Papineau; 2nd-round pick in 2003	To St. Louis Blues: Chris Osgood; 3rd-round pick in 2003	
March 11, 2003	To New York Islanders: Janne Niinimaa; 2nd-round pick in 2003	To Edmonton Oilers: Brad Isbister; Raffi Torres	

=== Players acquired ===
Date	Player	Former team	Term	Via	Ref
July 18, 2002	Alan Letang	Calgary Flames		Free agency	
July 19, 2002	Eric Manlow	Boston Bruins		Free agency	
July 22, 2002	Blaine Down	Barrie Colts (OHL)	multi-year	Free agency	
August 3, 2002	Brandon Smith	San Jose Sharks		Free agency	
August 6, 2002	Jeff Hamilton	Karpat (Liiga)		Free agency	
September 6, 2002	Alain Nasreddine	Edmonton Oilers		Free agency	
May 26, 2003	Wade Dubielewicz	University of Denver (WCHA)	1-year	Free agency	

=== Players lost ===
Date	Player	New team	Via (Note: In parentheses is the player's free agency group on July 1 if applicable.)	Ref
June 14, 2002	Chris Armstrong	EV Zug (NLA)	Free agency (VI)	
July 1, 2002	Jim Cummins (Note: Cummins was inactive during the 2002–03 season.)		Contract expiration (III)	
July 9, 2002	Kip Miller	Washington Capitals	Free agency (III)	
July 12, 2002	Raymond Giroux	New Jersey Devils	Free agency (VI)	
July 17, 2002	Jason Krog	Anaheim Mighty Ducks	Free agency (VI)	
July 29, 2002	Jason Podollan	Adler Mannheim (DEL)	Free agency (VI)	
August 6, 2002	Dick Tarnstrom	Pittsburgh Penguins	Waivers	
August 26, 2002	Dave Roche	New Jersey Devils	Free agency (UFA)	
August 26, 2002	Ken Sutton	New Jersey Devils	Free agency	
October 14, 2002	Evgeny Korolev	Lokomotiv Yaroslavl (RSL)	Free agency (Note: The Islanders retained Korolev's NHL rights through the 2006–07 season.)	
November 3, 2002	Mats Lindgren	Vancouver Canucks	Free agency (UFA)	
January 9, 2003	Darren Van Impe	Syracuse Crunch (AHL)	Free agency (UFA)	

=== Signings ===
Date	Player	Term	Contract type	Ref
July 3, 2002	Mattias Weinhandl	multi-year	Entry-level	
July 17, 2002	Martin Chabada	multi-year	Entry-level	
July 23, 2002	Adrian Aucoin	2-year	Re-signing	
July 26, 2002	Eric Cairns	2-year	Re-signing	
August 1, 2002	Jason Wiemer	1-year	Re-signing	
August 2, 2002	Mattias Timander	2-year	Re-signing	
August 3, 2002	Arron Asham	1-year	Re-signing	
August 6, 2002	Mark Parrish	2-year	Re-signing	
August 7, 2002	Shawn Bates	2-year	Extension	
August 20, 2002	Dave Scatchard	2-year	Arbitration award	
September 12, 2002	Steve Webb	1-year	Re-signing	

== Draft picks ==
New York's draft picks at the 2002 NHL entry draft held at the Air Canada Centre in Toronto, Ontario.

Round	#	Player	Nationality	College/Junior/Club team (League)
1	22	Sean Bergenheim	Finland	Jokerit (Finland)
3	87	Frans Nielsen	Denmark	Malmö IF (Sweden)
5	149	Marcus Paulsson	Sweden	Morrums GoIS IK (Sweden)
6	189	Alexei Stonkus	Russia	Yaroslavl Jrs. (Russia)
7	220	Brad Topping	Canada	Brampton Battalion (OHL)
8	252	Martin Chabada	Czech Republic	Sparta Prague (Czech Republic)
9	283	Per Braxenholm	Sweden	Morrums GoIS IK (Sweden)

== See also ==
- 2002–03 NHL season
