= 2002–03 Chicago Blackhawks season =

National Hockey League team season

2002–03 Chicago Blackhawks
- Division: 3rd Central
- Conference: 9th Western
- 2002–03 record: 30–33–13–6
- Home record: 17–15–7–2
- Road record: 13–18–6–4
- Goals for: 207
- Goals against: 226

Team information
- General manager: Mike Smith
- Coach: Brian Sutter
- Captain: Alexei Zhamnov
- Alternate captains: Kyle Calder (Mar.–Apr.); Eric Daze (Mar.–Apr.); Phil Housley (Oct.–Mar.); Jon Klemm; Lyle Odelein (Oct.–Mar.); Steve Sullivan (Mar.–Apr.); Steve Thomas (Oct.–Mar.)
- Arena: United Center
- Average attendance: 14,794 (72.2%)
- Minor league affiliates: Norfolk Admirals; Roanoke Express

Team leaders
- Goals: Steve Sullivan (26)
- Assists: Alexei Zhamnov (43)
- Points: Steve Sullivan (61)
- Penalty minutes: Chris Simon (125)
- Plus/minus: Steve Sullivan (+15)
- Wins: Jocelyn Thibault (26)
- Goals against average: Jocelyn Thibault (2.37)

The 2002–03 Chicago Blackhawks season was the Chicago Blackhawks' 77th season of operation. Finishing ninth in the Western Conference, they failed to qualify for the playoffs.

== Offseason ==
Forward Alexei Zhamnov was named captain, following the departure of Tony Amonte.

== Regular season ==
- January 8, 2003: Chicago Blackhawks goaltender Michael Leighton gained a shutout in his NHL debut in a 0–0 tie versus the Phoenix Coyotes. Coyotes goaltender Zac Bierk earned his first career shutout, although it was not his NHL debut. It was the first time that two goalies in the same game both earned their first career shutouts.

=== Final standings ===
Central Division
No.	CR		GP	W	L	T	OTL	GF	GA	Pts
1	2	**Detroit Red Wings**	82	48	20	10	4	269	203	110
2	5	**St. Louis Blues**	82	41	24	11	6	253	222	99
3	9	Chicago Blackhawks	82	30	33	13	6	207	226	79
4	13	Nashville Predators	82	27	35	13	7	183	206	74
5	15	Columbus Blue Jackets	82	29	42	8	3	213	263	69

Note: CR = Conference rank; GP = Games played; W = Wins; L = Losses; T = Ties; OTL = Overtime loss; GF = Goals for; GA = Goals against; Pts = Points
Bolded teams qualified for the playoffs.

Western Conference
R		Div	GP	W	L	T	OTL	GF	GA	Pts
**1**	**Z-** Dallas Stars	**PA**	**82**	**46**	**17**	**15**	**4**	**245**	**169**	111
**2**	**Y-** Detroit Red Wings	**CE**	**82**	**48**	**20**	**10**	**4**	**269**	**203**	110
**3**	**Y-** Colorado Avalanche	**NW**	**82**	**42**	**19**	**13**	**8**	**251**	**194**	105
**4**	**X-** Vancouver Canucks	**NW**	**82**	**45**	**23**	**13**	**1**	**264**	**208**	104
**5**	**X-** St. Louis Blues	**CE**	**82**	**41**	**24**	**11**	**6**	**253**	**222**	99
**6**	**X-** Minnesota Wild	**NW**	**82**	**42**	**29**	**10**	**1**	**198**	**178**	95
**7**	**X-** Mighty Ducks of Anaheim	**PA**	**82**	**40**	**27**	**9**	**6**	**203**	**193**	95
**8**	**X-** Edmonton Oilers	**NW**	**82**	**36**	**26**	**11**	**9**	**231**	**230**	92
8.5
9	Chicago Blackhawks	CE	82	30	33	13	6	207	226	79
10	Los Angeles Kings	PA	82	33	37	6	6	203	221	78
11	Phoenix Coyotes	PA	82	31	35	11	5	204	230	78
12	Calgary Flames	NW	82	29	36	13	4	186	228	75
13	Nashville Predators	CE	82	27	35	13	7	183	206	74
14	San Jose Sharks	PA	82	28	37	9	8	214	239	73
15	Columbus Blue Jackets	CE	82	29	42	8	3	213	263	69

Divisions: PA – Pacific, CE – Central, NW – Northwest

Z – Clinched conference; Y – Clinched division; X – Clinched playoff spot

== Schedule and results ==
2002–03 regular season
October: 5–3–1–0 (home: 5–2–0–0; road: 0–1–1–0)

Game	Date	Score	Opponent	Record	Recap
1	October 10, 2002	1–2	@ Columbus Blue Jackets (2002–03)	0–1–0–0	L
2	October 13, 2002	3–0	Buffalo Sabres (2002–03)	1–1–0–0	W
3	October 17, 2002	4–1	Florida Panthers (2002–03)	2–1–0–0	W
4	October 19, 2002	2–5	Calgary Flames (2002–03)	2–2–0–0	L
5	October 24, 2002	2–3	Minnesota Wild (2002–03)	2–3–0–0	L
6	October 26, 2002	3–3 OT	@ Carolina Hurricanes (2002–03)	2–3–1–0	T
7	October 27, 2002	3–2	San Jose Sharks (2002–03)	3–3–1–0	W
8	October 29, 2002	3–2	Columbus Blue Jackets (2002–03)	4–3–1–0	W
9	October 31, 2002	2–1 OT	Los Angeles Kings (2002–03)	5–3–1–0	W

November: 5–7–2–0 (home: 2–1–1–0; road: 3–6–1–0)

Game	Date	Score	Opponent	Record	Recap
10	November 2, 2002	1–5	@ New Jersey Devils (2002–03)	5–4–1–0	L
11	November 3, 2002	1–4	Edmonton Oilers (2002–03)	5–5–1–0	L
12	November 5, 2002	2–0	@ Detroit Red Wings (2002–03)	6–5–1–0	W
13	November 7, 2002	5–0	Atlanta Thrashers (2002–03)	7–5–1–0	W
14	November 9, 2002	3–2 OT	@ Tampa Bay Lightning (2002–03)	8–5–1–0	W
15	November 11, 2002	2–2 OT	@ Florida Panthers (2002–03)	8–5–2–0	T
16	November 15, 2002	2–2 OT	Washington Capitals (2002–03)	8–5–3–0	T
17	November 17, 2002	4–2	Nashville Predators (2002–03)	9–5–3–0	W
18	November 19, 2002	1–3	@ Edmonton Oilers (2002–03)	9–6–3–0	L
19	November 20, 2002	3–5	@ Vancouver Canucks (2002–03)	9–7–3–0	L
20	November 23, 2002	1–3	@ Calgary Flames (2002–03)	9–8–3–0	L
21	November 25, 2002	0–1	@ Colorado Avalanche (2002–03)	9–9–3–0	L
22	November 28, 2002	4–2	@ Phoenix Coyotes (2002–03)	10–9–3–0	W
23	November 30, 2002	1–4	@ Los Angeles Kings (2002–03)	10–10–3–0	L

December: 8–3–3–0 (home: 5–2–1–0; road: 3–1–2–0)

Game	Date	Score	Opponent	Record	Recap
24	December 1, 2002	2–3	@ Mighty Ducks of Anaheim (2002–03)	10–11–3–0	L
25	December 4, 2002	1–0	Ottawa Senators (2002–03)	11–11–3–0	W
26	December 6, 2002	3–4	Mighty Ducks of Anaheim (2002–03)	11–12–3–0	L
27	December 8, 2002	3–1	Tampa Bay Lightning (2002–03)	12–12–3–0	W
28	December 10, 2002	3–2	@ New York Islanders (2002–03)	13–12–3–0	W
29	December 11, 2002	4–3	@ New York Rangers (2002–03)	14–12–3–0	W
30	December 13, 2002	1–1 OT	@ Buffalo Sabres (2002–03)	14–12–4–0	T
31	December 15, 2002	0–5	Dallas Stars (2002–03)	14–13–4–0	L
32	December 17, 2002	3–2	Vancouver Canucks (2002–03)	15–13–4–0	W
33	December 20, 2002	3–1	Columbus Blue Jackets (2002–03)	16–13–4–0	W
34	December 22, 2002	3–1	Los Angeles Kings (2002–03)	17–13–4–0	W
35	December 26, 2002	2–2 OT	Minnesota Wild (2002–03)	17–13–5–0	T
36	December 28, 2002	3–3 OT	@ San Jose Sharks (2002–03)	17–13–6–0	T
37	December 30, 2002	2–0	@ Los Angeles Kings (2002–03)	18–13–6–0	W

January: 4–5–3–3 (home: 2–1–2–1; road: 2–4–1–2)

Game	Date	Score	Opponent	Record	Recap
38	January 2, 2003	4–1	@ St. Louis Blues (2002–03)	19–13–6–0	W
39	January 4, 2003	3–3 OT	@ Nashville Predators (2002–03)	19–13–7–0	T
40	January 5, 2003	3–4 OT	Detroit Red Wings (2002–03)	19–13–7–1	OTL
41	January 8, 2003	0–0 OT	Phoenix Coyotes (2002–03)	19–13–8–1	T
42	January 9, 2003	3–4 OT	@ Dallas Stars (2002–03)	19–13–8–2	OTL
43	January 12, 2003	2–0	Nashville Predators (2002–03)	20–13–8–2	W
44	January 13, 2003	4–5 OT	@ Detroit Red Wings (2002–03)	20–13–8–3	OTL
45	January 15, 2003	4–1	Detroit Red Wings (2002–03)	21–13–8–3	W
46	January 17, 2003	2–4	Vancouver Canucks (2002–03)	21–14–8–3	L
47	January 18, 2003	2–4	@ St. Louis Blues (2002–03)	21–15–8–3	L
48	January 20, 2003	1–5	@ Columbus Blue Jackets (2002–03)	21–16–8–3	L
49	January 23, 2003	3–3 OT	St. Louis Blues (2002–03)	21–16–9–3	T
50	January 25, 2003	3–5	@ Pittsburgh Penguins (2002–03)	21–17–9–3	L
51	January 26, 2003	3–4	@ Montreal Canadiens (2002–03)	21–18–9–3	L
52	January 30, 2003	3–1	@ Boston Bruins (2002–03)	22–18–9–3	W

February: 2–9–1–0 (home: 0–6–0–0; road: 2–3–1–0)

Game	Date	Score	Opponent	Record	Recap
53	February 5, 2003	1–2	@ Minnesota Wild (2002–03)	22–19–9–3	L
54	February 6, 2003	2–2 OT	@ Calgary Flames (2002–03)	22–19–10–3	T
55	February 8, 2003	3–0	@ Edmonton Oilers (2002–03)	23–19–10–3	W
56	February 10, 2003	1–2	@ Vancouver Canucks (2002–03)	23–20–10–3	L
57	February 12, 2003	1–3	Toronto Maple Leafs (2002–03)	23–21–10–3	L
58	February 14, 2003	2–4	San Jose Sharks (2002–03)	23–22–10–3	L
59	February 15, 2003	7–1	@ Columbus Blue Jackets (2002–03)	24–22–10–3	W
60	February 17, 2003	4–5	Colorado Avalanche (2002–03)	24–23–10–3	L
61	February 20, 2003	1–2	Phoenix Coyotes (2002–03)	24–24–10–3	L
62	February 23, 2003	0–3	Dallas Stars (2002–03)	24–25–10–3	L
63	February 25, 2003	0–2	Philadelphia Flyers (2002–03)	24–26–10–3	L
64	February 27, 2003	2–5	@ Philadelphia Flyers (2002–03)	24–27–10–3	L

March: 4–6–2–3 (home: 2–3–2–1; road: 2–3–0–2)

Game	Date	Score	Opponent	Record	Recap
65	March 1, 2003	4–5 OT	@ Nashville Predators (2002–03)	24–27–10–4	OTL
66	March 2, 2003	2–3 OT	Colorado Avalanche (2002–03)	24–27–10–5	OTL
67	March 5, 2003	4–7	@ Dallas Stars (2002–03)	24–28–10–5	L
68	March 7, 2003	0–2	Calgary Flames (2002–03)	24–29–10–5	L
69	March 9, 2003	8–5	Boston Bruins (2002–03)	25–29–10–5	W
70	March 12, 2003	2–5	@ Mighty Ducks of Anaheim (2002–03)	25–30–10–5	L
71	March 14, 2003	4–0	@ Phoenix Coyotes (2002–03)	26–30–10–5	W
72	March 17, 2003	3–2 OT	@ San Jose Sharks (2002–03)	27–30–10–5	W
73	March 19, 2003	3–4	Mighty Ducks of Anaheim (2002–03)	27–31–10–5	L
74	March 22, 2003	1–8	@ Colorado Avalanche (2002–03)	27–32–10–5	L
75	March 23, 2003	1–1 OT	Pittsburgh Penguins (2002–03)	27–32–11–5	T
76	March 25, 2003	2–9	New York Islanders (2002–03)	27–33–11–5	L
77	March 27, 2003	4–1	Nashville Predators (2002–03)	28–33–11–5	W
78	March 28, 2003	3–4 OT	@ Minnesota Wild (2002–03)	28–33–11–6	OTL
79	March 30, 2003	4–4 OT	Edmonton Oilers (2002–03)	28–33–12–6	T

April: 2–0–1–0 (home: 1–0–1–0; road: 1–0–0–0)

Game	Date	Score	Opponent	Record	Recap
80	April 3, 2003	6–4	@ St. Louis Blues (2002–03)	29–33–12–6	W
81	April 4, 2003	2–2 OT	St. Louis Blues (2002–03)	29–33–13–6	T
82	April 6, 2003	4–3 OT	Detroit Red Wings (2002–03)	30–33–13–6	W

Legend: W Win (2 points) L Loss (0 points) T Tie (1 point) OTL Overtime loss (1 point)

== Player statistics ==
=== Scoring ===
- Position abbreviations: C = Center; D = Defense; G = Goaltender; LW = Left wing; RW = Right wing
- † = Joined team via a transaction (e.g., trade, waivers, signing) during the season. Stats reflect time with the Blackhawks only.
- ‡ = Left team via a transaction (e.g., trade, waivers, release) during the season. Stats reflect time with the Blackhawks only.

No.	Player	Pos	Regular season					
No.	Player	Pos	GP	G	A	Pts	+/-	PIM
26	Steve Sullivan	RW	82	26	35	61	15	42
13	Alexei Zhamnov	C	74	15	43	58	0	70
55	Eric Daze	RW	54	22	22	44	10	14
19	Kyle Calder	LW	82	15	27	42	−6	40
39	Tyler Arnason	C	82	19	20	39	7	20
14	Theoren Fleury	RW	54	12	21	33	−7	77
94	Sergei Berezin‡	LW	66	18	13	31	−3	8
28	Mark Bell	C	82	14	15	29	0	113
6	Phil Housley‡	D	57	6	23	29	7	24
43	Nathan Dempsey	D	67	5	23	28	−7	26
11	Andrei Nikolishin†	C	60	6	15	21	−3	26
17	Chris Simon†	LW	61	12	6	18	−4	125
32	Steve Thomas‡	LW	69	4	13	17	0	51
42	Jon Klemm	D	70	2	14	16	−9	44
25	Alexander Karpovtsev	D	40	4	10	14	−8	12
8	Steve Poapst	D	75	2	11	13	14	50
20	Mike Eastwood†	C	53	2	10	12	−6	24
7	Lyle Odelein‡	D	65	7	4	11	7	76
22	Igor Korolev	C	48	4	5	9	−1	30
50	Igor Radulov	LW	7	5	0	5	−3	4
34	Jason Strudwick	D	48	2	3	5	−4	87
5	Steve McCarthy	D	57	1	4	5	−1	23
2	Boris Mironov‡	D	20	3	1	4	−1	22
92	Michael Nylander‡	C	9	0	4	4	0	4
49	Shawn Thornton	RW	13	1	1	2	−4	31
44	Burke Henry†	D	16	0	2	2	−13	9
46	Todd Gill†	D	5	0	1	1	3	0
4	Sami Helenius†	D	10	0	1	1	3	28
15	Garry Valk	RW	16	0	1	1	0	6
16	Peter White‡	C	6	0	1	1	0	0
31	Craig Anderson	G	6	0	0	0		0
33	Louie DeBrusk	LW	4	0	0	0	0	7
30	Michael Leighton	G	8	0	0	0		0
53	Brett McLean	C	2	0	0	0	−1	0
29	Steve Passmore	G	11	0	0	0		4
41	Jocelyn Thibault	G	62	0	0	0		4
23	Ryan VandenBussche	RW	22	0	0	0	0	58

=== Goaltending ===
No.	Player	Regular season									
No.	Player	GP	W	L	T	SA	GA	GAA	SV%	SO	TOI
41	Jocelyn Thibault	62	26	28	7	1690	144	2.37	.915	8	3650
30	Michael Leighton	8	2	3	2	241	21	2.82	.913	1	447
29	Steve Passmore	11	2	5	2	284	38	3.70	.866	0	617
31	Craig Anderson	6	0	3	2	125	18	4.00	.856	0	270

== Awards and records ==
=== Awards ===
Type	Award/honor	Recipient	Ref
League (annual)	NHL All-Rookie Team	Tyler Arnason (Forward)	
League (in-season)	NHL All-Star Game selection	Jocelyn Thibault	
League (in-season)	NHL Player of the Week	Jocelyn Thibault (November 11)	
League (in-season)	NHL Rookie of the Month	Tyler Arnason (October)	
League (in-season)	NHL Rookie of the Month	Tyler Arnason (December)	
League (in-season)	NHL YoungStars Game selection	Tyler Arnason	

=== Milestones ===
Milestone	Player	Date	Ref
First game	Shawn Thornton	October 10, 2002	
First game	Craig Anderson	November 30, 2002	
First game	Brett McLean	December 10, 2002	
First game	Michael Leighton	January 8, 2003	
First game	Burke Henry	February 20, 2003	
First game	Igor Radulov	March 23, 2003	
500th game played	Jocelyn Thibault	January 17, 2003	
400th goal	Steve Thomas	February 17, 2003	

== Transactions ==
The Blackhawks were involved in the following transactions from June 14, 2002, the day after the deciding game of the 2002 Stanley Cup Finals, through June 9, 2003, the day of the deciding game of the 2003 Stanley Cup Finals.

=== Trades ===
Date	Details		Ref
June 22, 2002	To Chicago Blackhawks: 3rd-round pick in 2002; 4th-round pick in 2002	To San Jose Sharks: 3rd-round pick in 2002	
June 30, 2002	To Chicago Blackhawks: Sergei Berezin	To Montreal Canadiens: 4th-round pick in 2004	
November 1, 2002	To Chicago Blackhawks: Andrei Nikolishin; Chris Simon	To Washington Capitals: Michael Nylander; 3rd-round pick in 2003; Conditional 3rd-round pick in 2004	
January 8, 2003	To Chicago Blackhawks: 4th-round pick in 2004	To New York Rangers: Boris Mironov	
March 10, 2003	To Chicago Blackhawks: Sami Helenius; Conditional draft pick (Note: Chicago’s choice of an 8th-round pick in 2003 or a 7th-round pick in 2004.)	To Dallas Stars: Lyle Odelein	
March 11, 2003	To Chicago Blackhawks: 5th-round pick in 2003	To Anaheim Mighty Ducks: Steve Thomas	
March 11, 2003	To Chicago Blackhawks: Future considerations	To Philadelphia Flyers: Peter White	
March 11, 2003	To Chicago Blackhawks: Future considerations (Note: Chicago would receive either a 4th-round pick in 2003 or a 9th-round pick in 2003 and a 4th-round pick in 2004.)	To Toronto Maple Leafs: Phil Housley	
March 11, 2003	To Chicago Blackhawks: 4th-round pick in 2004	To Washington Capitals: Sergei Berezin	

=== Players acquired ===
Date	Player	Former team	Term	Via	Ref
July 12, 2002	Nathan Dempsey	Toronto Maple Leafs		Free agency	
July 15, 2002	Jason Strudwick	Vancouver Canucks		Free agency	
July 23, 2002	Brett McLean	Minnesota Wild		Free agency	
August 15, 2002	Theoren Fleury	San Jose Sharks		Free agency	
August 30, 2002	Louie DeBrusk	Hamilton Bulldogs (AHL)		Free agency	
October 9, 2002	Garry Valk	Toronto Maple Leafs		Free agency	
October 21, 2002	Travis Moen	Kelowna Rockets (WHL)		Free agency	
December 11, 2002	Mike Eastwood	St. Louis Blues		Waivers	
December 11, 2002	Burke Henry	Norfolk Admirals (AHL)		Free agency	
March 5, 2003	Todd Gill	Springfield Falcons (AHL)		Free agency	
June 4, 2003	Quintin Laing	Norfolk Admirals (AHL)		Free agency	

=== Players lost ===
Date	Player	New team	Via (Note: In parentheses is the player's free agency group on July 1 if applicable.)	Ref
July 1, 2002	Chris Feil (Note: Feil, who last played during the 1999–2000 season, retired.)		Contract expiration (UFA)	
July 3, 2002	Aaron Downey	Dallas Stars	Free agency (VI)	
July 11, 2002	Nolan Baumgartner	Vancouver Canucks	Free agency (VI)	
July 12, 2002	Tony Amonte	Phoenix Coyotes	Free agency (III)	
July 17, 2002	Tom Fitzgerald	Toronto Maple Leafs	Free agency (III)	
July 18, 2002	Vladimir Chebaturkin	New York Rangers	Free agency (VI)	
July 19, 2002	Jim Campbell	Florida Panthers	Free agency (UFA)	
August 27, 2002	Chris McAlpine	Los Angeles Kings	Free agency (UFA)	
November 23, 2002	Jean-Yves Leroux	Saint-Georges Garaga (QSPHL)	Free agency (UFA)	
November 29, 2002	Rumun Ndur	Graz 99ers (EBEL)	Free agency (VI)	
January 29, 2003	Joe Reekie		Retirement (III)	
February 21, 2003	Ty Jones	Anchorage Aces (ECHL)	Free agency (II) (Note: Chicago retained Jones’ NHL rights until trading them to the Florida Panthers on March 2, 2004.)	

=== Signings ===
Date	Player	Term	Contract type	Ref
June 18, 2002	Steve Poapst		Re-signing	
June 26, 2002	Steve Thomas		Re-signing	
June 27, 2002	Bob Probert		Re-signing	
June 28, 2002	Phil Housley		Re-signing	
July 2, 2002	Steve Passmore		Re-signing	
July 10, 2002	Sergei Berezin		Re-signing	
July 25, 2002	Dmitri Tolkunov		Re-signing	
August 2, 2002	Boris Mironov	1-year	Re-signing	
August 8, 2002	Kyle Calder		Re-signing	
August 13, 2002	Anton Babchuk		Entry-level	
October 21, 2002	Matt Keith		Entry-level	
June 2, 2003	Pavel Vorobiev		Entry-level	

== Draft picks ==
Chicago's draft picks at the 2002 NHL entry draft held at the Air Canada Centre in Toronto, Ontario.

Round	#	Player	Nationality	College/Junior/Club team (League)
1	21	Anton Babchuk	Russia	Elemash Elektrostal (Russia)
2	54	Duncan Keith	Canada	Michigan State University (CCHA)
3	93	Alexander Kozhevnikov	Russia	Krylya Sovetov Jr. (Russia)
4	128	Matt Ellison	Canada	Cowichan Valley Capitals (BCHL)
5	156	James Wisniewski	United States	Plymouth Whalers (OHL)
6	188	Kevin Kantee	Finland	Jokerit Jr. (Finland)
7	219	Tyson Kellerman	Canada	North Bay Centennials (OHL)
8	251	Jason Kostadine	United States	Hull Olympiques (QMJHL)
9	282	Adam Burish	United States	Green Bay Gamblers (USHL)

== See also ==
- 2002–03 NHL season
