= 2002–03 Carolina Hurricanes season =

National Hockey League team season

2002–03 Carolina Hurricanes
- Division: 5th Southeast
- Conference: 15th Eastern
- 2002–03 record: 22–43–11–6
- Home record: 12–17–9–3
- Road record: 10–26–2–3
- Goals for: 171
- Goals against: 240

Team information
- General manager: Jim Rutherford
- Coach: Paul Maurice
- Captain: Ron Francis
- Alternate captains: Rod Brind'Amour; Glen Wesley (Oct.–Mar.)
- Arena: RBC Center
- Average attendance: 15,682
- Minor league affiliates: Lowell Lock Monsters; Florida Everblades

Team leaders
- Goals: Jeff O'Neill (30)
- Assists: Ron Francis (35)
- Points: Jeff O'Neill (61)
- Penalty minutes: Sean Hill (141)
- Plus/minus: Sean Hill (+4)
- Wins: Kevin Weekes (14)
- Goals against average: Kevin Weekes (2.55)

The 2002–03 Carolina Hurricanes season was the franchise's 24th season in the National Hockey League and sixth as the Hurricanes. The Hurricanes missed the playoffs, despite being the defending Eastern Conference champions, making a Cinderella run to the 2002 Stanley Cup Final the previous year against the Detroit Red Wings, and losing in five games. The team finished the season with an NHL-worst record of 22–43–11–6 (61 points).

== Regular season ==
The Hurricanes finished 30th in scoring, with just 171 goals for. They also had the most power-play opportunities of all 30 teams, with 420.

=== Final standings ===
Southeast Division
No.	CR		GP	W	L	T	OTL	GF	GA	Pts
1	3	**Tampa Bay Lightning**	82	36	25	16	5	219	210	93
2	6	**Washington Capitals**	82	39	29	8	6	224	220	92
3	11	Atlanta Thrashers	82	31	39	7	5	226	284	74
4	13	Florida Panthers	82	24	36	13	9	176	237	70
5	15	Carolina Hurricanes	82	22	43	11	6	171	240	61

Note: CR = Conference rank; GP = Games played; W = Wins; L = Losses; T = Ties; OTL = Overtime loss; GF = Goals for; GA = Goals against; Pts = Points
Bolded teams qualified for the playoffs.

Eastern Conference
R		Div	GP	W	L	T	OTL	GF	GA	Pts
**1**	**P-** Ottawa Senators	**NE**	**82**	**52**	**21**	**8**	**1**	**263**	**182**	113
**2**	**Y-** New Jersey Devils	**AT**	**82**	**46**	**20**	**10**	**6**	**216**	**166**	108
**3**	**Y-** Tampa Bay Lightning	**SE**	**82**	**36**	**25**	**16**	**5**	**219**	**210**	93
**4**	**X-** Philadelphia Flyers	**AT**	**82**	**45**	**20**	**13**	**4**	**211**	**166**	107
**5**	**X-** Toronto Maple Leafs	**NE**	**82**	**44**	**28**	**7**	**3**	**236**	**208**	98
**6**	**X-** Washington Capitals	**SE**	**82**	**39**	**29**	**8**	**6**	**224**	**220**	92
**7**	**X-** Boston Bruins	**NE**	**82**	**36**	**31**	**11**	**4**	**245**	**237**	87
**8**	**X-** New York Islanders	**AT**	**82**	**35**	**34**	**11**	**2**	**224**	**231**	83
8.5
9	New York Rangers	AT	82	32	36	10	4	210	231	78
10	Montreal Canadiens	NE	82	30	35	8	9	206	234	77
11	Atlanta Thrashers	SE	82	31	39	7	5	226	284	74
12	Buffalo Sabres	NE	82	27	37	10	8	190	219	72
13	Florida Panthers	SE	82	24	36	13	9	176	237	70
14	Pittsburgh Penguins	AT	82	27	44	6	5	189	255	65
15	Carolina Hurricanes	SE	82	22	43	11	6	171	240	61

Divisions: AT – Atlantic, NE – Northeast, SE – Southeast

P – Clinched Presidents Trophy; Y – Clinched division; X – Clinched playoff spot

== Schedule and results ==
2002–03 regular season
October: 5–4–1–1 (home: 3–2–1–0; road: 2–2–0–1)

Game	Date	Score	Opponent	Record	Attendance	Recap
1	October 9, 2002	1–4	New York Rangers (2002–03)	0–1–0–0	18,730	L
2	October 11, 2002	5–3	Atlanta Thrashers (2002–03)	1–1–0–0	13,962	W
3	October 12, 2002	1–5	@ Tampa Bay Lightning (2002–03)	1–2–0–0	19,814	L
4	October 15, 2002	1–2 OT	@ St. Louis Blues (2002–03)	1–2–0–1	13,222	OTL
5	October 17, 2002	1–2	Washington Capitals (2002–03)	1–3–0–1	10,597	L
6	October 19, 2002	3–1	New Jersey Devils (2002–03)	2–3–0–1	15,518	W
7	October 22, 2002	4–1	@ New York Islanders (2002–03)	3–3–0–1	13,514	W
8	October 23, 2002	1–4	@ Ottawa Senators (2002–03)	3–4–0–1	14,847	L
9	October 26, 2002	3–3 OT	Chicago Blackhawks (2002–03)	3–4–1–1	15,613	T
10	October 29, 2002	2–1	@ New Jersey Devils (2002–03)	4–4–1–1	10,328	W
11	October 30, 2002	4–2	New York Islanders (2002–03)	5–4–1–1	12,495	W

November: 6–3–3–2 (home: 4–1–3–2; road: 2–2–0–0)

Game	Date	Score	Opponent	Record	Attendance	Recap
12	November 1, 2002	2–2 OT	Montreal Canadiens (2002–03)	5–4–2–1	15,357	T
13	November 5, 2002	1–2 OT	Philadelphia Flyers (2002–03)	5–4–2–2	15,501	OTL
14	November 7, 2002	2–0	Buffalo Sabres (2002–03)	6–4–2–2	11,588	W
15	November 9, 2002	3–2	Pittsburgh Penguins (2002–03)	7–4–2–2	18,730	W
16	November 12, 2002	3–2	Phoenix Coyotes (2002–03)	8–4–2–2	10,707	W
17	November 15, 2002	1–1 OT	Philadelphia Flyers (2002–03)	8–4–3–2	17,480	T
18	November 17, 2002	1–2 OT	Tampa Bay Lightning (2002–03)	8–4–3–3	13,970	OTL
19	November 19, 2002	4–4 OT	Ottawa Senators (2002–03)	8–4–4–3	11,044	T
20	November 21, 2002	1–3	@ Boston Bruins (2002–03)	8–5–4–3	10,667	L
21	November 23, 2002	7–3	@ Montreal Canadiens (2002–03)	9–5–4–3	20,420	W
22	November 25, 2002	1–3	@ New York Rangers (2002–03)	9–6–4–3	18,200	L
23	November 27, 2002	2–3	Vancouver Canucks (2002–03)	9–7–4–3	14,943	L
24	November 29, 2002	6–4	Detroit Red Wings (2002–03)	10–7–4–3	18,730	W
25	November 30, 2002	4–2	@ Columbus Blue Jackets (2002–03)	11–7–4–3	18,136	W

December: 4–8–1–0 (home: 1–3–1–0; road: 3–5–0–0)

Game	Date	Score	Opponent	Record	Attendance	Recap
26	December 3, 2002	2–1	@ Nashville Predators (2002–03)	12–7–4–3	10,258	W
27	December 4, 2002	2–4	@ Florida Panthers (2002–03)	12–8–4–3	10,944	L
28	December 6, 2002	0–2	Florida Panthers (2002–03)	12–9–4–3	17,006	L
29	December 7, 2002	2–5	@ Ottawa Senators (2002–03)	12–10–4–3	15,328	L
30	December 11, 2002	1–4	@ Edmonton Oilers (2002–03)	12–11–4–3	16,091	L
31	December 12, 2002	4–3	@ Calgary Flames (2002–03)	13–11–4–3	14,528	W
32	December 15, 2002	1–2	@ Minnesota Wild (2002–03)	13–12–4–3	18,568	L
33	December 18, 2002	1–1 OT	Tampa Bay Lightning (2002–03)	13–12–5–3	15,236	T
34	December 20, 2002	3–2 OT	@ Atlanta Thrashers (2002–03)	14–12–5–3	12,831	W
35	December 22, 2002	1–0	Dallas Stars (2002–03)	15–12–5–3	17,127	W
36	December 27, 2002	3–5	Atlanta Thrashers (2002–03)	15–13–5–3	18,730	L
37	December 28, 2002	0–3	@ New York Islanders (2002–03)	15–14–5–3	15,559	L
38	December 31, 2002	0–2	New York Rangers (2002–03)	15–15–5–3	18,730	L

January: 2–10–1–2 (home: 1–5–0–1; road: 1–5–1–1)

Game	Date	Score	Opponent	Record	Attendance	Recap
39	January 3, 2003	3–6	@ Buffalo Sabres (2002–03)	15–16–5–3	13,757	L
40	January 4, 2003	4–2	@ Boston Bruins (2002–03)	16–16–5–3	16,407	W
41	January 7, 2003	3–3 OT	@ Atlanta Thrashers (2002–03)	16–16–6–3	9,061	T
42	January 8, 2003	1–5	@ New York Rangers (2002–03)	16–17–6–3	18,200	L
43	January 10, 2003	1–4	Washington Capitals (2002–03)	16–18–6–3	16,553	L
44	January 12, 2003	2–3 OT	Colorado Avalanche (2002–03)	16–18–6–4	18,730	OTL
45	January 15, 2003	0–2	Pittsburgh Penguins (2002–03)	16–19–6–4	15,265	L
46	January 17, 2003	1–2	New Jersey Devils (2002–03)	16–20–6–4	18,730	L
47	January 18, 2003	2–5	@ New Jersey Devils (2002–03)	16–21–6–4	17,574	L
48	January 20, 2003	3–5	St. Louis Blues (2002–03)	16–22–6–4	14,654	L
49	January 22, 2003	3–5	@ Washington Capitals (2002–03)	16–23–6–4	12,954	L
50	January 24, 2003	3–1	Florida Panthers (2002–03)	17–23–6–4	15,346	W
51	January 25, 2003	2–3 OT	@ Florida Panthers (2002–03)	17–23–6–5	16,122	OTL
52	January 29, 2003	2–3	Toronto Maple Leafs (2002–03)	17–24–6–5	18,094	L
53	January 30, 2003	1–3	@ Tampa Bay Lightning (2002–03)	17–25–6–5	13,541	L

February: 1–6–3–1 (home: 1–1–2–0; road: 0–5–1–1)

Game	Date	Score	Opponent	Record	Attendance	Recap
54	February 5, 2003	2–6	@ San Jose Sharks (2002–03)	17–26–6–5	17,108	L
55	February 7, 2003	2–8	@ Los Angeles Kings (2002–03)	17–27–6–5	18,118	L
56	February 9, 2003	1–2	@ Mighty Ducks of Anaheim (2002–03)	17–28–6–5	15,599	L
57	February 11, 2003	1–2 OT	@ Dallas Stars (2002–03)	17–28–6–6	18,532	OTL
58	February 14, 2003	3–1	Washington Capitals (2002–03)	18–28–6–6	17,003	W
59	February 15, 2003	2–2 OT	@ Philadelphia Flyers (2002–03)	18–28–7–6	19,408	T
60	February 18, 2003	3–4	@ Toronto Maple Leafs (2002–03)	18–29–7–6	19,365	L
61	February 19, 2003	1–1 OT	Boston Bruins (2002–03)	18–29–8–6	16,194	T
62	February 21, 2003	2–2 OT	Tampa Bay Lightning (2002–03)	18–29–9–6	16,732	T
63	February 23, 2003	0–4	Mighty Ducks of Anaheim (2002–03)	18–30–9–6	15,053	L
64	February 26, 2003	2–4	@ Phoenix Coyotes (2002–03)	18–31–9–6	12,168	L

March: 4–9–2–0 (home: 2–4–2–0; road: 2–5–0–0)

Game	Date	Score	Opponent	Record	Attendance	Recap
65	March 1, 2003	1–4	@ Toronto Maple Leafs (2002–03)	18–32–9–6	19,362	L
66	March 2, 2003	0–2	@ Washington Capitals (2002–03)	18–33–9–6	16,198	L
67	March 4, 2003	2–4	Boston Bruins (2002–03)	18–34–9–6	14,973	L
68	March 6, 2003	4–0	@ Pittsburgh Penguins (2002–03)	19–34–9–6	14,812	W
69	March 7, 2003	1–0	Minnesota Wild (2002–03)	20–34–9–6	13,224	W
70	March 10, 2003	6–5	Columbus Blue Jackets (2002–03)	21–34–9–6	13,066	W
71	March 12, 2003	3–2 OT	@ Buffalo Sabres (2002–03)	22–34–9–6	15,425	W
72	March 13, 2003	3–5	@ Philadelphia Flyers (2002–03)	22–35–9–6	19,399	L
73	March 15, 2003	0–0 OT	Los Angeles Kings (2002–03)	22–35–10–6	16,017	T
74	March 18, 2003	5–6	Ottawa Senators (2002–03)	22–36–10–6	16,531	L
75	March 22, 2003	3–5	@ Montreal Canadiens (2002–03)	22–37–10–6	21,273	L
76	March 25, 2003	3–3 OT	Toronto Maple Leafs (2002–03)	22–37–11–6	16,262	T
77	March 26, 2003	1–5	@ Atlanta Thrashers (2002–03)	22–38–11–6	9,994	L
78	March 29, 2003	1–3	Buffalo Sabres (2002–03)	22–39–11–6	17,677	L
79	March 31, 2003	0–4	Montreal Canadiens (2002–03)	22–40–11–6	14,157	L

April: 0–3–0–0 (home: 0–1–0–0; road: 0–2–0–0)

Game	Date	Score	Opponent	Record	Attendance	Recap
80	April 2, 2003	2–3	@ Pittsburgh Penguins (2002–03)	22–41–11–6	15,718	L
81	April 4, 2003	1–4	@ Florida Panthers (2002–03)	22–42–11–6	16,544	L
82	April 6, 2003	1–2	New York Islanders (2002–03)	22–43–11–6	16,918	L

Legend: W Win (2 points) L Loss (0 points) T Tie (1 point) OTL Overtime loss (1 point)

== Player statistics ==
=== Scoring ===
- Position abbreviations: C = Center; D = Defense; G = Goaltender; LW = Left wing; RW = Right wing
- † = Joined team via a transaction (e.g., trade, waivers, signing) during the season. Stats reflect time with the Hurricanes only.
- ‡ = Left team via a transaction (e.g., trade, waivers, release) during the season. Stats reflect time with the Hurricanes only.

No.	Player	Pos	Regular season					
No.	Player	Pos	GP	G	A	Pts	+/-	PIM
92	Jeff O'Neill	LW	82	30	31	61	−21	38
10	Ron Francis	C	82	22	35	57	−22	30
17	Rod Brind'Amour	C	48	14	23	37	−9	37
22	Sean Hill	D	82	5	24	29	4	141
26	Erik Cole	RW	53	14	13	27	1	72
20	Jan Hlavac†	LW	52	9	15	24	−9	22
63	Josef Vasicek	C	57	10	10	20	−19	33
13	Bates Battaglia‡	LW	70	5	14	19	−17	90
14	Kevyn Adams	C	77	9	9	18	−8	57
27	Craig Adams	RW	81	6	12	18	−11	71
24	Sami Kapanen‡	RW	43	6	12	18	−17	12
6	Bret Hedican	D	72	3	14	17	−24	75
47	Ryan Bayda	LW	25	4	10	14	−5	16
62	Jaroslav Svoboda	LW	48	3	11	14	−5	32
21	David Tanabe	D	68	3	10	13	−27	24
7	Niclas Wallin	D	77	2	8	10	−19	71
4	Aaron Ward	D	77	3	6	9	−23	90
2	Glen Wesley‡	D	63	1	7	8	−5	40
25	Bruno St. Jacques†	D	18	2	5	7	−3	12
19	Radim Vrbata†	LW	10	5	0	5	−7	2
37	Tomas Kurka	LW	14	3	2	5	1	2
12	Craig MacDonald	LW	35	1	3	4	−3	20
11	Jeff Daniels	C	59	0	4	4	−9	8
39	Brad DeFauw	LW	9	3	0	3	−2	2
42	Jeff Heerema	RW	10	3	0	3	−2	2
36	Jesse Boulerice	RW	48	2	1	3	−2	108
46	Michael Zigomanis	C	19	2	1	3	−4	0
71	Tomas Malec	D	41	0	2	2	−5	43
5	Marek Malik‡	D	10	0	2	2	−3	16
52	Damian Surma	C	1	1	0	1	0	0
55	Pavel Brendl†	LW	8	0	1	1	−3	2
15	Harold Druken†‡†	C	14	0	1	1	−1	2
30	Patrick DesRochers†	G	2	0	0	0		0
28	Steven Halko	D	6	0	0	0	1	0
1	Arturs Irbe	G	34	0	0	0		4
20	Darren Langdon‡	LW	9	0	0	0	0	16
29	Mike Watt	LW	5	0	0	0	−1	0
80	Kevin Weekes	G	51	0	0	0		2
16	Tommy Westlund	RW	3	0	0	0	0	0

=== Goaltending ===
- † = Joined team via a transaction (e.g., trade, waivers, signing) during the season. Stats reflect time with the Hurricanes only.

No.	Player	Regular season									
No.	Player	GP	W	L	T	SA	GA	GAA	SV%	SO	TOI
80	Kevin Weekes	51	14	24	9	1438	126	2.50	0.912	5	2965
1	Arturs Irbe	34	7	24	2	816	100	3.18	0.877	0	1884
30	Patrick DesRochers†	2	1	1	0	71	7	3.41	0.901	0	122

== Awards and records ==
=== Awards ===
Type	Award/honor	Recipient	Ref
League (in-season)	NHL All-Star Game selection	Jeff O'Neill	
League (in-season)	NHL YoungStars Game selection	Erik Cole (Note: Cole suffered a broken leg two days before the game and did not play.)	
Team	Good Guy Award	Kevyn Adams	
Team	Most Valuable Player	Ron Francis	
Team	Steve Chiasson Award	Kevyn Adams	

=== Milestones ===
Milestone	Player	Date	Ref
1,000th game played	Rod Brind'Amour	November 15, 2002	
First game	Tomas Malec	December 15, 2002	
First game	Jeff Heerema	January 17, 2003	
First game	Ryan Bayda	February 14, 2003	
First game	Tomas Kurka	February 26, 2003	
First game	Michael Zigomanis	February 26, 2003	
First game	Brad DeFauw	March 10, 2003	
First game	Damian Surma	March 18, 2003	

== Transactions ==
The Hurricanes were involved in the following transactions from June 14, 2002, the day after the deciding game of the 2002 Stanley Cup Final, through June 9, 2003, the day of the deciding game of the 2003 Stanley Cup Final.

=== Trades ===
Date	Details		Ref
June 22, 2002	To Carolina Hurricanes: Carolina’s 3rd-round pick in 2002	To Philadelphia Flyers: 6th-round pick in 2002; 3rd-round pick in 2003	
June 23, 2002	To Carolina Hurricanes: 4th-round pick in 2003	To Tampa Bay Lightning: 6th-round pick in 2002; 8th-round pick in 2002; Philadelphia’s 8th-round pick in 2002; 9th-round pick in 2002	
November 1, 2002	To Carolina Hurricanes: Harold Druken; Jan Hlavac	To Vancouver Canucks: Darren Langdon; Marek Malik	
December 31, 2002	To Carolina Hurricanes: Patrick DesRochers	To Phoenix Coyotes: Jean-Marc Pelletier; Conditional draft pick in 2003	
February 7, 2003	To Carolina Hurricanes: Pavel Brendl; Bruno St. Jacques	To Philadelphia Flyers: Ryan Bast; Sami Kapanen	
March 9, 2003	To Carolina Hurricanes: 2nd-round pick in 2004	To Toronto Maple Leafs: Glen Wesley	
March 11, 2003	To Carolina Hurricanes: Radim Vrbata	To Colorado Avalanche: Bates Battaglia	
May 29, 2003	To Carolina Hurricanes: Allan Rourke	To Toronto Maple Leafs: Harold Druken	

=== Players acquired ===
Date	Player	Former team	Term	Via	Ref
July 16, 2002	Ryan Bast	Lowell Lock Monsters (AHL)	1-year	Free agency	
July 16, 2002	Ed Hill	Lowell Lock Monsters (AHL)	3-year	Free agency	
August 5, 2002	Steven Halko	St. Louis Blues		Free agency	
August 9, 2002	Mike Watt	Philadelphia Flyers	1-year	Free agency	
January 17, 2003	Harold Druken	Toronto Maple Leafs		Waivers	

=== Players lost ===
Date	Player	New team	Via (Note: In parentheses is the player's free agency group on July 1 if applicable.)	Ref
July 2, 2002	Martin Gelinas	Calgary Flames	Free agency (III)	
July 2, 2002	Ian MacNeil	Philadelphia Flyers	Free agency (VI)	
July 5, 2002	Tyler Moss	Vancouver Canucks	Free agency (UFA)	
July 19, 2002	Jeremiah McCarthy	Amur Khabarovsk (RSL)	Free agency (UFA)	
August 28, 2002	Ted Drury	Hamburg Freezers (DEL)	Free agency (UFA)	
N/A	Greg Kuznik	Lowell Lock Monsters (AHL)	Free agency (UFA)	
December 11, 2002	Harold Druken	Toronto Maple Leafs	Waivers	
April 11, 2003	Tommy Westlund	Leksands IF (SHL)	Free agency	

=== Signings ===
Date	Player	Term	Contract type	Ref
June 26, 2002	Jeff O'Neill	2-year	Re-signing	
June 27, 2002	Darren Langdon	2-year	Re-signing	
June 29, 2002	Ron Francis	2-year	Re-signing	
June 30, 2002	Bret Hedican	6-year	Re-signing	
July 9, 2002	Daniel Boisclair	3-year	Entry-level	
July 11, 2002	Kevyn Adams	2-year	Re-signing	
July 24, 2002	Brad DeFauw	2-year	Re-signing	
August 1, 2002	Kaspars Astashenko	1-year	Re-signing	
August 1, 2002	Jesse Boulerice	2-year	Re-signing	
August 1, 2002	Jeff Daniels	1-year	Re-signing	
August 1, 2002	Nikos Tselios	1-year	Re-signing	
August 2, 2002	Niclas Wallin	2-year	Re-signing	
August 8, 2002	Aaron Ward	4-year	Re-signing	
August 13, 2002	Sami Kapanen	1-year	Re-signing	
August 14, 2002	Randy Petruk	2-year	Re-signing	
September 13, 2002	David Tanabe	1-year	Re-signing	
October 9, 2002	Sean Curry	3-year	Entry-level	
March 24, 2003	Brad Fast	2-year	Entry-level	
April 26, 2003	Jeff Daniels	1-year	Extension	
April 28, 2003	Patrick DesRochers	1-year	Extension	
May 2, 2003	Craig Adams	1-year	Extension	
June 6, 2003	Kevin Weekes	1-year	Extension	

== Draft picks ==
Carolina's picks at the 2002 NHL entry draft in Toronto, Ontario, Canada.

Round	#	Player	Position	Nationality	College/Junior/Club team (League)
1	25	Cam Ward	G	Canada	Red Deer Rebels (WHL)
3	91	Jesse Lane	D	United States	Hull Olympiques (QMJHL)
5	160	Daniel Manzato	G	Canada	Victoriaville Tigres (QMJHL)
7	224	Adam Taylor	C	United States	Kootenay Ice (WHL)

== Farm teams ==
=== American Hockey League ===
The Lowell Lock Monsters are the Hurricanes American Hockey League affiliate for the 2002–03 AHL season.

=== East Coast Hockey League ===
The Florida Everblades are the Hurricanes East Coast Hockey League affiliate.
