= 2002–03 Minnesota Wild season =

National Hockey League team season

2002–03 Minnesota Wild
- Division: 3rd Northwest
- Conference: 6th Western
- 2002–03 record: 42–29–10–1
- Home record: 25–13–3–0
- Road record: 17–16–7–1
- Goals for: 198
- Goals against: 178

Team information
- General manager: Doug Risebrough
- Coach: Jacques Lemaire
- Captain: Rotating; Brad Bombardir (Oct.–Nov.); Matt Johnson (Dec.); Sergei Zholtok (Jan.); Brad Bombardir (Feb.–Apr.)
- Alternate captains: Jim Dowd; Wes Walz
- Arena: Xcel Energy Center
- Average attendance: 18,500
- Minor league affiliates: Houston Aeros; Louisiana IceGators

Team leaders
- Goals: Marian Gaborik (30)
- Assists: Marian Gaborik (35)
- Points: Marian Gaborik (65)
- Penalty minutes: Matt Johnson (201)
- Plus/minus: Pascal Dupuis (+17)
- Wins: Dwayne Roloson (23)
- Goals against average: Dwayne Roloson (2.00)

The 2002–03 Minnesota Wild season was the team's third season in the National Hockey League (NHL). After qualifying for the Stanley Cup playoffs for the first time in franchise history, the Wild won two playoff series before losing in the Western Conference Final to the Mighty Ducks of Anaheim.

== Regular season ==
The Wild tied the Calgary Flames, Nashville Predators and Pittsburgh Penguins for most times shut-out with 10.

=== Final standings ===
Northwest Division
No.	CR		GP	W	L	T	OTL	GF	GA	Pts
1	3	**Colorado Avalanche**	82	42	19	13	8	251	194	105
2	4	**Vancouver Canucks**	82	45	23	13	1	264	208	104
3	6	**Minnesota Wild**	82	42	29	10	1	198	178	95
4	8	**Edmonton Oilers**	82	36	26	11	9	231	230	92
5	12	Calgary Flames	82	29	36	13	4	186	228	75

Note: CR = Conference rank; GP = Games played; W = Wins; L = Losses; T = Ties; OTL = Overtime loss; GF = Goals for; GA = Goals against; Pts = Points
Bolded teams qualified for the playoffs.

Western Conference
R		Div	GP	W	L	T	OTL	GF	GA	Pts
**1**	**Z-** Dallas Stars	**PA**	**82**	**46**	**17**	**15**	**4**	**245**	**169**	111
**2**	**Y-** Detroit Red Wings	**CE**	**82**	**48**	**20**	**10**	**4**	**269**	**203**	110
**3**	**Y-** Colorado Avalanche	**NW**	**82**	**42**	**19**	**13**	**8**	**251**	**194**	105
**4**	**X-** Vancouver Canucks	**NW**	**82**	**45**	**23**	**13**	**1**	**264**	**208**	104
**5**	**X-** St. Louis Blues	**CE**	**82**	**41**	**24**	**11**	**6**	**253**	**222**	99
**6**	**X-** Minnesota Wild	**NW**	**82**	**42**	**29**	**10**	**1**	**198**	**178**	95
**7**	**X-** Mighty Ducks of Anaheim	**PA**	**82**	**40**	**27**	**9**	**6**	**203**	**193**	95
**8**	**X-** Edmonton Oilers	**NW**	**82**	**36**	**26**	**11**	**9**	**231**	**230**	92
8.5
9	Chicago Blackhawks	CE	82	30	33	13	6	207	226	79
10	Los Angeles Kings	PA	82	33	37	6	6	203	221	78
11	Phoenix Coyotes	PA	82	31	35	11	5	204	230	78
12	Calgary Flames	NW	82	29	36	13	4	186	228	75
13	Nashville Predators	CE	82	27	35	13	7	183	206	74
14	San Jose Sharks	PA	82	28	37	9	8	214	239	73
15	Columbus Blue Jackets	CE	82	29	42	8	3	213	263	69

Divisions: PA – Pacific, CE – Central, NW – Northwest

Z – Clinched conference; Y – Clinched division; X – Clinched playoff spot

== Playoffs ==
The Wild are the only team in NHL history to rally back from 3–1 down twice in the same playoff.

== Schedule and results ==
=== Regular season ===
2002–03 regular season
October: 8–1–2–0 (home: 6–1–0–0; road: 2–0–2–0)

Game	Date	Score	Opponent	Record	Recap
1	October 11, 2002	5–1	Boston Bruins (2002–03)	1–0–0–0	W
2	October 12, 2002	2–2 OT	@ St. Louis Blues (2002–03)	1–0–1–0	T
3	October 15, 2002	4–1	Florida Panthers (2002–03)	2–0–1–0	W
4	October 17, 2002	3–1	Dallas Stars (2002–03)	3–0–1–0	W
5	October 19, 2002	3–5	Detroit Red Wings (2002–03)	3–1–1–0	L
6	October 22, 2002	4–3 OT	Calgary Flames (2002–03)	4–1–1–0	W
7	October 24, 2002	3–2	@ Chicago Blackhawks (2002–03)	5–1–1–0	W
8	October 26, 2002	6–1	@ Phoenix Coyotes (2002–03)	6–1–1–0	W
9	October 27, 2002	3–3 OT	@ Colorado Avalanche (2002–03)	6–1–2–0	T
10	October 29, 2002	3–2 OT	Colorado Avalanche (2002–03)	7–1–2–0	W
11	October 31, 2002	2–1 OT	San Jose Sharks (2002–03)	8–1–2–0	W

November: 5–6–3–0 (home: 2–3–3–0; road: 3–3–0–0)

Game	Date	Score	Opponent	Record	Recap
12	November 2, 2002	2–4	Vancouver Canucks (2002–03)	8–2–2–0	L
13	November 4, 2002	5–2	@ Los Angeles Kings (2002–03)	9–2–2–0	W
14	November 7, 2002	1–4	@ Phoenix Coyotes (2002–03)	9–3–2–0	L
15	November 9, 2002	4–2	@ San Jose Sharks (2002–03)	10–3–2–0	W
16	November 10, 2002	0–1	@ Mighty Ducks of Anaheim (2002–03)	10–4–2–0	L
17	November 12, 2002	2–3	Edmonton Oilers (2002–03)	10–5–2–0	L
18	November 14, 2002	1–1 OT	Pittsburgh Penguins (2002–03)	10–5–3–0	T
19	November 16, 2002	1–0	Washington Capitals (2002–03)	11–5–3–0	W
20	November 19, 2002	2–2 OT	Los Angeles Kings (2002–03)	11–5–4–0	T
21	November 21, 2002	4–3	@ Washington Capitals (2002–03)	12–5–4–0	W
22	November 23, 2002	4–2	Nashville Predators (2002–03)	13–5–4–0	W
23	November 25, 2002	1–2	Vancouver Canucks (2002–03)	13–6–4–0	L
24	November 27, 2002	0–5	@ Dallas Stars (2002–03)	13–7–4–0	L
25	November 29, 2002	2–2 OT	Colorado Avalanche (2002–03)	13–7–5–0	T

December: 7–4–2–1 (home: 4–2–0–0; road: 3–2–2–1)

Game	Date	Score	Opponent	Record	Recap
26	December 3, 2002	1–2 OT	@ Edmonton Oilers (2002–03)	13–7–5–1	OTL
27	December 5, 2002	1–1 OT	@ Calgary Flames (2002–03)	13–7–6–1	T
28	December 7, 2002	4–2	@ Vancouver Canucks (2002–03)	14–7–6–1	W
29	December 10, 2002	5–3	Tampa Bay Lightning (2002–03)	15–7–6–1	W
30	December 12, 2002	3–2	@ Detroit Red Wings (2002–03)	16–7–6–1	W
31	December 14, 2002	1–3	@ Nashville Predators (2002–03)	16–8–6–1	L
32	December 15, 2002	2–1	Carolina Hurricanes (2002–03)	17–8–6–1	W
33	December 17, 2002	4–3 OT	Edmonton Oilers (2002–03)	18–8–6–1	W
34	December 19, 2002	2–4	New York Islanders (2002–03)	18–9–6–1	L
35	December 21, 2002	2–4	@ Colorado Avalanche (2002–03)	18–10–6–1	L
36	December 23, 2002	2–3	Calgary Flames (2002–03)	18–11–6–1	L
37	December 26, 2002	2–2 OT	@ Chicago Blackhawks (2002–03)	18–11–7–1	T
38	December 28, 2002	4–3	@ Buffalo Sabres (2002–03)	19–11–7–1	W
39	December 31, 2002	4–1	Mighty Ducks of Anaheim (2002–03)	20–11–7–1	W

January: 5–7–1–0 (home: 2–4–0–0; road: 3–3–1–0)

Game	Date	Score	Opponent	Record	Recap
40	January 2, 2003	2–1 OT	@ Edmonton Oilers (2002–03)	21–11–7–1	W
41	January 4, 2003	2–3	@ Calgary Flames (2002–03)	21–12–7–1	L
42	January 6, 2003	2–3	Los Angeles Kings (2002–03)	21–13–7–1	L
43	January 8, 2003	1–2	Columbus Blue Jackets (2002–03)	21–14–7–1	L
44	January 10, 2003	2–1	Phoenix Coyotes (2002–03)	22–14–7–1	W
45	January 14, 2003	0–1	Buffalo Sabres (2002–03)	22–15–7–1	L
46	January 16, 2003	5–2	Vancouver Canucks (2002–03)	23–15–7–1	W
47	January 18, 2003	0–1	Mighty Ducks of Anaheim (2002–03)	23–16–7–1	L
48	January 20, 2003	2–1 OT	@ Mighty Ducks of Anaheim (2002–03)	24–16–7–1	W
49	January 23, 2003	2–1	@ Los Angeles Kings (2002–03)	25–16–7–1	W
50	January 25, 2003	1–4	@ San Jose Sharks (2002–03)	25–17–7–1	L
51	January 28, 2003	2–2 OT	@ Vancouver Canucks (2002–03)	25–17–8–1	T
52	January 29, 2003	1–5	@ Edmonton Oilers (2002–03)	25–18–8–1	L

February: 7–4–0–0 (home: 4–2–0–0; road: 3–2–0–0)

Game	Date	Score	Opponent	Record	Recap
53	February 5, 2003	2–1	Chicago Blackhawks (2002–03)	26–18–8–1	W
54	February 7, 2003	4–3	San Jose Sharks (2002–03)	27–18–8–1	W
55	February 9, 2003	2–3	@ New Jersey Devils (2002–03)	27–19–8–1	L
56	February 10, 2003	1–0	@ Philadelphia Flyers (2002–03)	28–19–8–1	W
57	February 12, 2003	2–0	Philadelphia Flyers (2002–03)	29–19–8–1	W
58	February 14, 2003	2–3	Phoenix Coyotes (2002–03)	29–20–8–1	L
59	February 15, 2003	2–3	@ Colorado Avalanche (2002–03)	29–21–8–1	L
60	February 19, 2003	2–4	New York Rangers (2002–03)	29–22–8–1	L
61	February 23, 2003	3–1	St. Louis Blues (2002–03)	30–22–8–1	W
62	February 25, 2003	3–0	@ Ottawa Senators (2002–03)	31–22–8–1	W
63	February 27, 2003	6–3	@ Montreal Canadiens (2002–03)	32–22–8–1	W

March: 9–5–2–0 (home: 6–1–0–0; road: 3–4–2–0)

Game	Date	Score	Opponent	Record	Recap
64	March 1, 2003	0–2	@ St. Louis Blues (2002–03)	32–23–8–1	L
65	March 4, 2003	3–2	New Jersey Devils (2002–03)	33–23–8–1	W
66	March 6, 2003	2–2 OT	@ Nashville Predators (2002–03)	33–23–9–1	T
67	March 7, 2003	0–1	@ Carolina Hurricanes (2002–03)	33–24–9–1	L
68	March 9, 2003	6–4	@ Atlanta Thrashers (2002–03)	34–24–9–1	W
69	March 12, 2003	4–2	Dallas Stars (2002–03)	35–24–9–1	W
70	March 14, 2003	3–1	Nashville Predators (2002–03)	36–24–9–1	W
71	March 15, 2003	0–5	@ Columbus Blue Jackets (2002–03)	36–25–9–1	L
72	March 17, 2003	3–3 OT	@ Tampa Bay Lightning (2002–03)	36–25–10–1	T
73	March 19, 2003	3–1	@ Florida Panthers (2002–03)	37–25–10–1	W
74	March 21, 2003	3–2 OT	@ Dallas Stars (2002–03)	38–25–10–1	W
75	March 23, 2003	4–0	Detroit Red Wings (2002–03)	39–25–10–1	W
76	March 25, 2003	0–4	@ Detroit Red Wings (2002–03)	39–26–10–1	L
77	March 26, 2003	0–1	St. Louis Blues (2002–03)	39–27–10–1	L
78	March 28, 2003	4–3 OT	Chicago Blackhawks (2002–03)	40–27–10–1	W
79	March 31, 2003	3–0	Calgary Flames (2002–03)	41–27–10–1	W

April: 1–2–0–0 (home: 1–0–0–0; road: 0–2–0–0)

Game	Date	Score	Opponent	Record	Recap
80	April 2, 2003	0–3	@ Columbus Blue Jackets (2002–03)	41–28–10–1	L
81	April 3, 2003	1–2	@ Toronto Maple Leafs (2002–03)	41–29–10–1	L
82	April 6, 2003	4–3	Columbus Blue Jackets (2002–03)	42–29–10–1	W

Legend: W Win (2 points) L Loss (0 points) T Tie (1 point) OTL Overtime loss (1 point)

=== Playoffs ===
2003 Stanley Cup playoffs
Western Conference quarterfinals vs. (3) Colorado Avalanche – Wild win 4–3

Game	Date	Visitor	Score	Home	OT	Decision	Attendance	Series	Recap
1	April 10	Minnesota	4–2	Colorado		Roloson	18,007	Wild lead 1–0	W
2	April 12	Minnesota	2–3	Colorado		Roloson	18,007	Series tied 1–1	L
3	April 14	Colorado	3–0	Minnesota		Roloson	19,354	Avalanche lead 2–1	L
4	April 16	Colorado	3–1	Minnesota		Roloson	19,350	Avalanche lead 3–1	L
5	April 19	Minnesota	3–2	Colorado		Fernandez	18,007	Avalanche lead 3–2	W
6	April 21	Colorado	2–3	Minnesota	OT	Fernandez	19,350	Series tied 3–3	W
7	April 22	Minnesota	3–2	Colorado	OT	Fernandez	18,007	Wild win 4–3	W

Western Conference semifinals vs. (4) Vancouver Canucks – Wild win 4–3

Game	Date	Visitor	Score	Home	OT	Decision	Attendance	Series	Recap
1	April 25	Minnesota	3–4	Vancouver	OT	Fernandez	18,514	Canucks lead 1–0	L
2	April 27	Minnesota	3–2	Vancouver		Roloson	18,514	Series tied 1–1	W
3	April 29	Vancouver	3–2	Minnesota		Roloson	19,394	Canucks lead 2–1	L
4	May 2	Vancouver	3–2	Minnesota	OT	Fernandez	19,386	Canucks lead 3–1	L
5	May 5	Minnesota	7–2	Vancouver		Roloson	18,514	Canucks lead 3–2	W
6	May 7	Vancouver	1–5	Minnesota		Roloson	19,350	Series tied 3–3	W
7	May 8	Minnesota	4–2	Vancouver		Roloson	18,514	Wild win 4–3	W

Western Conference finals vs. (7) Anaheim Mighty Ducks – Mighty Ducks win 4–0

Game	Date	Visitor	Score	Home	OT	Decision	Attendance	Series	Recap
1	May 10	Anaheim	1–0	Minnesota	2OT	Fernandez	19,350	Mighty Ducks lead 1–0	L
2	May 12	Anaheim	2–0	Minnesota		Roloson	19,350	Mighty Ducks lead 2–0	L
3	May 14	Minnesota	0–4	Anaheim		Roloson	17,174	Mighty Ducks lead 3–0	L
4	May 16	Minnesota	1–2	Anaheim		Fernandez	17,174	Mighty Ducks win 4–0	L

Legend: W Win L Loss

== Player statistics ==
=== Scoring ===
- Position abbreviations: C = Center; D = Defense; G = Goaltender; LW = Left wing; RW = Right wing
- † = Joined team via a transaction (e.g., trade, waivers, signing) during the season. Stats reflect time with the Wild only.
- ‡ = Left team via a transaction (e.g., trade, waivers, release) during the season. Stats reflect time with the Wild only.

No.	Player	Pos	Regular season						Playoffs					
No.	Player	Pos	GP	G	A	Pts	+/-	PIM	GP	G	A	Pts	+/-	PIM
10	Marian Gaborik	RW	81	30	35	65	12	46	18	9	8	17	2	6
11	Pascal Dupuis	LW	80	20	28	48	17	44	16	4	4	8	0	8
7	Cliff Ronning	C	80	17	31	48	−6	24	17	2	7	9	−3	4
15	Andrew Brunette	LW	82	18	28	46	−10	30	18	7	6	13	−3	4
33	Sergei Zholtok	C	78	16	26	42	1	18	18	2	11	13	−7	0
37	Wes Walz	C	80	13	19	32	11	63	18	7	6	13	5	14
24	Antti Laaksonen	LW	82	15	16	31	4	26	16	1	3	4	−3	4
17	Filip Kuba	D	78	8	21	29	0	29	18	3	5	8	−8	24
34	Jim Dowd	C	78	8	17	25	−1	31	15	0	2	2	−1	0
18	Richard Park	RW	81	14	10	24	−3	16	18	3	3	6	−2	4
96	Pierre-Marc Bouchard	C	50	7	13	20	1	18	5	0	1	1	−1	2
20	Andrei Zyuzin†	D	66	4	12	16	−7	34	18	0	1	1	−3	14
5	Brad Bombardir	D	58	1	14	15	15	16	4	0	0	0	−1	0
2	Willie Mitchell	D	69	2	12	14	13	84	18	1	3	4	5	14
28	Jeremy Stevenson†	LW	32	5	6	11	6	69	14	0	5	5	0	12
77	Lubomir Sekeras	D	60	2	9	11	−12	30	15	1	1	2	−2	6
55	Nick Schultz	D	75	3	7	10	11	23	18	0	1	1	5	10
16	Bill Muckalt	RW	8	5	3	8	5	6	5	0	0	0	−3	0
12	Matt Johnson	LW	60	3	5	8	−8	201	12	0	0	0	0	25
14	Darby Hendrickson	C	28	1	5	6	−3	8	17	2	3	5	1	4
23	Jason Marshall	D	45	1	5	6	4	69	15	1	1	2	−1	16
19	Stephane Veilleux	LW	38	3	2	5	−6	23	—	—	—	—	—	—
25	Rickard Wallin	C	4	1	0	1	1	0	—	—	—	—	—	—
27	Kyle Wanvig	RW	7	1	0	1	0	13	—	—	—	—	—	—
4	Brad Brown	D	57	0	1	1	−1	90	11	0	0	0	−1	16
35	Manny Fernandez	G	35	0	1	1		6	9	0	0	0		0
30	Dwayne Roloson	G	50	0	1	1		4	11	0	0	0		4
3	Ladislav Benysek	D	14	0	0	0	−3	8	—	—	—	—	—	—
36	Sylvain Blouin‡	LW	2	0	0	0	0	4	—	—	—	—	—	—
9	Hnat Domenichelli	LW	1	0	0	0	0	0	—	—	—	—	—	—
31	Dieter Kochan	G	1	0	0	0		0	—	—	—	—	—	—
38	Curtis Murphy	D	1	0	0	0	0	0	—	—	—	—	—	—
6	Jean-Guy Trudel	LW	1	0	0	0	0	2	—	—	—	—	—	—

=== Goaltending ===
No.	Player	Regular season										Playoffs								
No.	Player	GP	W	L	T	SA	GA	GAA	SV%	SO	TOI	GP	W	L	SA	GA	GAA	SV%	SO	TOI
30	Dwayne Roloson	50	23	16	8	1334	98	2.00	.927	4	2945	11	5	6	257	25	2.59	.903	0	579
35	Manny Fernandez	35	19	13	2	972	74	2.24	.924	2	1979	9	3	4	253	18	1.96	.929	0	552
31	Dieter Kochan	1	0	1	0	28	5	5.00	.821	0	60	—	—	—	—	—	—	—	—	—

== Awards and records ==
=== Awards ===
Type	Award/honor	Recipient	Ref
League (annual)	Jack Adams Award	Jacques Lemaire	
League (in-season)	NHL All-Star Game selection	Marian Gaborik	
League (in-season)	NHL Player of the Week	Marian Gaborik (October 28)	
League (in-season)	NHL YoungStars Game selection	Nick Schultz	
Team	Three Star Award	Dwayne Roloson	

=== Milestones ===
Milestone	Player	Date	Ref
First game	Pierre-Marc Bouchard	October 11, 2002	
First game	Stephane Veilleux	October 19, 2002	
First game	Kyle Wanvig	November 25, 2002	
First game	Rickard Wallin	December 12, 2002	
First game	Curtis Murphy	December 15, 2002	

== Transactions ==
The Wild were involved in the following transactions from June 14, 2002, the day after the deciding game of the 2002 Stanley Cup Finals, through June 9, 2003, the day of the deciding game of the 2003 Stanley Cup Finals.

=== Trades ===
Date	Details		Ref
June 22, 2002	To Minnesota Wild: 9th-round pick in 2002	To Calgary Flames: Jamie McLennan	
June 22, 2002	To Minnesota Wild: Cliff Ronning	To Los Angeles Kings: 4th-round pick in 2002	
October 31, 2002	To Minnesota Wild: 7th-round pick in 2003	To Montreal Canadiens: Sylvain Blouin	
February 20, 2003	To Minnesota Wild: Jay Henderson	To New York Rangers: Cory Larose	
March 11, 2003	To Minnesota Wild: Johan Holmqvist	To New York Rangers: Lawrence Nycholat	

=== Players acquired ===
Date	Player	Former team	Term	Via	Ref
July 3, 2002	Bill Muckalt	Ottawa Senators	multi-year	Free agency	
July 9, 2002	Tony Tuzzolino	Boston Bruins		Free agency	
July 16, 2002	Jean-Guy Trudel	Phoenix Coyotes		Free agency	
August 5, 2002	Dieter Kochan	Tampa Bay Lightning		Free agency	
November 2, 2002	Andrei Zyuzin	New Jersey Devils		Waivers	
November 26, 2002	Jeremy Stevenson	Houston Aeros (AHL)		Free agency	

=== Players lost ===
Date	Player	New team	Via (Note: In parentheses is the player's free agency group on July 1 if applicable.)	Ref
N/A	Steve Aronson	London Knights (BISL)	Free agency (UFA)	
July 2, 2002	Cam Stewart		Retirement (UFA)	
July 12, 2002	Mike Matteucci	New Jersey Devils	Free agency (VI)	
July 23, 2002	Brett McLean	Chicago Blackhawks	Free agency (UFA)	
July 24, 2002	Aaron Gavey	Toronto Maple Leafs	Free agency (UFA)	
August 13, 2002	Shawn Carter	Augsburger Panther (DEL)	Free agency (VI)	
August 27, 2002	Stacy Roest	Detroit Red Wings	Free agency (UFA)	
September 27, 2002	Mike Crowley		Retirement	
April 3, 2003	Jean-Guy Trudel	HC Ambri-Piotta (NLA)	Free agency	
April 14, 2003	Tony Virta	HPK (Liiga)	Free agency	

=== Signings ===
Date	Player	Term	Contract type	Ref
June 26, 2002	Sylvain Blouin	multi-year	Re-signing	
June 27, 2002	Travis Roche	multi-year	Re-signing	
July 8, 2002	Mike Crowley		Re-signing	
July 15, 2002	Rickard Wallin		Entry-level	
August 1, 2002	Brad Brown	1-year	Re-signing	
August 14, 2002	Ladislav Benysek	1-year	Re-signing	
August 14, 2002	Matt Johnson	1-year	Re-signing	
August 14, 2002	Cory Larose		Re-signing	
August 14, 2002	Richard Park	1-year	Re-signing	
August 19, 2002	Antti Laaksonen	1-year	Arbitration award	
September 27, 2002	Pierre-Marc Bouchard		Entry-level	
November 20, 2002	Filip Kuba	multi-year	Extension	
January 6, 2003	Chris Heid	multi-year	Entry-level	
March 11, 2003	Dwayne Roloson	multi-year	Extension	
April 6, 2003	Josh Harding		Entry-level	

== Draft picks ==
Minnesota's draft picks at the 2002 NHL entry draft held at the Air Canada Centre in Toronto, Ontario.

Round	#	Player	Nationality	College/Junior/Club team (League)
1	8	Pierre-Marc Bouchard	Canada	Chicoutimi Saguenéens (QMJHL)
2	38	Josh Harding	Canada	Regina Pats (WHL)
3	72	Mike Erickson	United States	University of Minnesota (WCHA)
3	73	Barry Brust	Canada	Spokane Chiefs (WHL)
5	155	Armands Berzins	Latvia	Shawinigan Cataractes (QMJHL)
6	175	Matt Foy	Canada	Merrimack College (Hockey East)
7	204	Niklas Eckerblom	Sweden	Djurgårdens IF (Elitserien)
8	237	Christoph Brandner	Austria	Krefeld Pinguine (DEL)
9	268	Mikhail Tyulyapkin	Russia	Torpedo Nizhny Novgorod Jr. (Russia)
9	269	Mika Hannula	Sweden	Malmö Redhawks (Elitserien)

== See also ==
- 2002–03 NHL season
