= 2002–03 Buffalo Sabres season =

NHL hockey team season

2002–03 Buffalo Sabres
- Division: 5th Northeast
- Conference: 12th Eastern
- 2002–03 record: 27–37–10–8
- Home record: 18–18–5–2
- Road record: 9–27–5–6
- Goals for: 190
- Goals against: 219

Team information
- General manager: Darcy Regier
- Coach: Lindy Ruff
- Captain: Stu Barnes (Oct.–Mar.); Vacant (Mar.–Apr.)
- Alternate captains: Rob Ray (Oct.–Mar.); Rhett Warrener
- Arena: HSBC Arena
- Average attendance: 13,776
- Minor league affiliate: Rochester Americans

Team leaders
- Goals: Miroslav Satan (26)
- Assists: Miroslav Satan (49)
- Points: Miroslav Satan (75)
- Penalty minutes: Eric Boulton (178)
- Plus/minus: Jochen Hecht and Curtis Brown (+4)
- Wins: Martin Biron (17)
- Goals against average: Mika Noronen (2.42)

The 2002–03 Buffalo Sabres season was the 33rd season of operation for the National Hockey League (NHL) franchise that was established on May 22, 1970. The Sabres failed to qualify for the playoffs for a second consecutive season. The 72 points accumulated in the regular season was the lowest total for the franchise since the 1986–87 season.

== Regular season ==
=== Final standings ===
Northeast Division
No.	CR		GP	W	L	T	OTL	GF	GA	Pts
1	1	**Ottawa Senators**	82	52	21	8	1	263	182	113
2	5	**Toronto Maple Leafs**	82	44	28	7	3	236	208	98
3	7	**Boston Bruins**	82	36	31	11	4	245	237	87
4	10	Montreal Canadiens	82	30	35	8	9	206	234	77
5	12	Buffalo Sabres	82	27	37	10	8	190	219	72

Note: CR = Conference rank; GP = Games played; W = Wins; L = Losses; T = Ties; OTL = Overtime loss; GF = Goals for; GA = Goals against; Pts = Points
Bolded teams qualified for the playoffs.

Eastern Conference
R		Div	GP	W	L	T	OTL	GF	GA	Pts
**1**	**P-** Ottawa Senators	**NE**	**82**	**52**	**21**	**8**	**1**	**263**	**182**	113
**2**	**Y-** New Jersey Devils	**AT**	**82**	**46**	**20**	**10**	**6**	**216**	**166**	108
**3**	**Y-** Tampa Bay Lightning	**SE**	**82**	**36**	**25**	**16**	**5**	**219**	**210**	93
**4**	**X-** Philadelphia Flyers	**AT**	**82**	**45**	**20**	**13**	**4**	**211**	**166**	107
**5**	**X-** Toronto Maple Leafs	**NE**	**82**	**44**	**28**	**7**	**3**	**236**	**208**	98
**6**	**X-** Washington Capitals	**SE**	**82**	**39**	**29**	**8**	**6**	**224**	**220**	92
**7**	**X-** Boston Bruins	**NE**	**82**	**36**	**31**	**11**	**4**	**245**	**237**	87
**8**	**X-** New York Islanders	**AT**	**82**	**35**	**34**	**11**	**2**	**224**	**231**	83
8.5
9	New York Rangers	AT	82	32	36	10	4	210	231	78
10	Montreal Canadiens	NE	82	30	35	8	9	206	234	77
11	Atlanta Thrashers	SE	82	31	39	7	5	226	284	74
12	Buffalo Sabres	NE	82	27	37	10	8	190	219	72
13	Florida Panthers	SE	82	24	36	13	9	176	237	70
14	Pittsburgh Penguins	AT	82	27	44	6	5	189	255	65
15	Carolina Hurricanes	SE	82	22	43	11	6	171	240	61

Divisions: AT – Atlantic, NE – Northeast, SE – Southeast

P – Clinched Presidents Trophy; Y – Clinched division; X – Clinched playoff spot

== Schedule and results ==
2002–03 regular season
October: 3–5–2–0 (home: 2–2–1–0; road: 1–3–1–0)

Game	Date	Score	Opponent	Record	Recap
1	October 10, 2002	5–1	New York Islanders (2002–03)	1–0–0–0	W
2	October 12, 2002	6–1	@ Montreal Canadiens (2002–03)	2–0–0–0	W
3	October 13, 2002	0–3	@ Chicago Blackhawks (2002–03)	2–1–0–0	L
4	October 17, 2002	4–4 OT	New York Rangers (2002–03)	2–1–1–0	T
5	October 19, 2002	2–3	Phoenix Coyotes (2002–03)	2–2–1–0	L
6	October 22, 2002	2–1	Philadelphia Flyers (2002–03)	3–2–1–0	W
7	October 25, 2002	1–2	New Jersey Devils (2002–03)	3–3–1–0	L
8	October 26, 2002	2–5	@ Pittsburgh Penguins (2002–03)	3–4–1–0	L
9	October 29, 2002	1–1 OT	@ Vancouver Canucks (2002–03)	3–4–2–0	T
10	October 31, 2002	0–3	@ Calgary Flames (2002–03)	3–5–2–0	L

November: 1–9–2–1 (home: 1–4–1–0; road: 0–5–1–1)

Game	Date	Score	Opponent	Record	Recap
11	November 1, 2002	1–1 OT	@ Edmonton Oilers (2002–03)	3–5–3–0	T
12	November 3, 2002	2–3	@ Columbus Blue Jackets (2002–03)	3–6–3–0	L
13	November 7, 2002	0–2	@ Carolina Hurricanes (2002–03)	3–7–3–0	L
14	November 9, 2002	4–6	Atlanta Thrashers (2002–03)	3–8–3–0	L
15	November 12, 2002	3–4	Boston Bruins (2002–03)	3–9–3–0	L
16	November 15, 2002	2–3	Toronto Maple Leafs (2002–03)	3–10–3–0	L
17	November 16, 2002	1–4	@ Ottawa Senators (2002–03)	3–11–3–0	L
18	November 19, 2002	3–4 OT	@ New Jersey Devils (2002–03)	3–11–3–1	OTL
19	November 22, 2002	5–4	Columbus Blue Jackets (2002–03)	4–11–3–1	W
20	November 23, 2002	1–4	@ Boston Bruins (2002–03)	4–12–3–1	L
21	November 27, 2002	1–1 OT	Tampa Bay Lightning (2002–03)	4–12–4–1	T
22	November 29, 2002	1–4	Pittsburgh Penguins (2002–03)	4–13–4–1	L
23	November 30, 2002	1–3	@ Toronto Maple Leafs (2002–03)	4–14–4–1	L

December: 4–8–1–1 (home: 3–4–1–1; road: 1–4–0–0)

Game	Date	Score	Opponent	Record	Recap
24	December 4, 2002	4–0	Mighty Ducks of Anaheim (2002–03)	5–14–4–1	W
25	December 6, 2002	4–1	@ New York Rangers (2002–03)	6–14–4–1	W
26	December 7, 2002	4–3	Washington Capitals (2002–03)	7–14–4–1	W
27	December 10, 2002	2–4	Ottawa Senators (2002–03)	7–15–4–1	L
28	December 13, 2002	1–1 OT	Chicago Blackhawks (2002–03)	7–15–5–1	T
29	December 14, 2002	0–2	@ Philadelphia Flyers (2002–03)	7–16–5–1	L
30	December 18, 2002	4–2	Boston Bruins (2002–03)	8–16–5–1	W
31	December 20, 2002	0–3	Florida Panthers (2002–03)	8–17–5–1	L
32	December 21, 2002	2–6	@ Montreal Canadiens (2002–03)	8–18–5–1	L
33	December 23, 2002	2–5	@ Pittsburgh Penguins (2002–03)	8–19–5–1	L
34	December 26, 2002	2–3	Ottawa Senators (2002–03)	8–20–5–1	L
35	December 28, 2002	3–4	Minnesota Wild (2002–03)	8–21–5–1	L
36	December 30, 2002	3–4	@ Washington Capitals (2002–03)	8–22–5–1	L
37	December 31, 2002	0–1 OT	New York Islanders (2002–03)	8–22–5–2	OTL

January: 7–2–2–2 (home: 3–1–1–0; road: 4–1–1–2)

Game	Date	Score	Opponent	Record	Recap
38	January 3, 2003	6–3	Carolina Hurricanes (2002–03)	9–22–5–2	W
39	January 4, 2003	2–1 OT	@ Ottawa Senators (2002–03)	10–22–5–2	W
40	January 7, 2003	2–3	@ Philadelphia Flyers (2002–03)	10–23–5–2	L
41	January 10, 2003	4–2	Boston Bruins (2002–03)	11–23–5–2	W
42	January 11, 2003	3–2	@ Montreal Canadiens (2002–03)	12–23–5–2	W
43	January 14, 2003	1–0	@ Minnesota Wild (2002–03)	13–23–5–2	W
44	January 16, 2003	2–2 OT	@ San Jose Sharks (2002–03)	13–23–6–2	T
45	January 18, 2003	1–0	@ Phoenix Coyotes (2002–03)	14–23–6–2	W
46	January 21, 2003	0–0 OT	Pittsburgh Penguins (2002–03)	14–23–7–2	T
47	January 24, 2003	4–0	Toronto Maple Leafs (2002–03)	15–23–7–2	W
48	January 25, 2003	3–4 OT	@ Ottawa Senators (2002–03)	15–23–7–3	OTL
49	January 27, 2003	1–5	Nashville Predators (2002–03)	15–24–7–3	L
50	January 30, 2003	1–2 OT	@ St. Louis Blues (2002–03)	15–24–7–4	OTL

February: 4–7–1–1 (home: 3–3–0–0; road: 1–4–1–1)

Game	Date	Score	Opponent	Record	Recap
51	February 4, 2003	1–4	@ New Jersey Devils (2002–03)	15–25–7–4	L
52	February 7, 2003	2–4	Vancouver Canucks (2002–03)	15–26–7–4	L
53	February 8, 2003	1–3	@ New York Islanders (2002–03)	15–27–7–4	L
54	February 11, 2003	2–3	St. Louis Blues (2002–03)	15–28–7–4	L
55	February 13, 2003	2–4	@ Detroit Red Wings (2002–03)	15–29–7–4	L
56	February 15, 2003	5–4	New York Rangers (2002–03)	16–29–7–4	W
57	February 17, 2003	3–4 OT	@ Atlanta Thrashers (2002–03)	16–29–7–5	OTL
58	February 19, 2003	2–1 OT	Montreal Canadiens (2002–03)	17–29–7–5	W
59	February 21, 2003	1–4	Los Angeles Kings (2002–03)	17–30–7–5	L
60	February 23, 2003	4–1	@ Tampa Bay Lightning (2002–03)	18–30–7–5	W
61	February 24, 2003	2–2 OT	@ Florida Panthers (2002–03)	18–30–8–5	T
62	February 26, 2003	2–3	@ Washington Capitals (2002–03)	18–31–8–5	L
63	February 28, 2003	5–3	Dallas Stars (2002–03)	19–31–8–5	W

March: 7–5–1–3 (home: 5–2–0–1; road: 2–3–1–2)

Game	Date	Score	Opponent	Record	Recap
64	March 1, 2003	1–2 OT	@ New York Islanders (2002–03)	19–31–8–6	OTL
65	March 4, 2003	1–2	Washington Capitals (2002–03)	19–32–8–6	L
66	March 6, 2003	4–2	Toronto Maple Leafs (2002–03)	20–32–8–6	W
67	March 8, 2003	4–0	@ Florida Panthers (2002–03)	21–32–8–6	W
68	March 9, 2003	1–1 OT	@ Tampa Bay Lightning (2002–03)	21–32–9–6	T
69	March 12, 2003	2–3 OT	Carolina Hurricanes (2002–03)	21–32–9–7	OTL
70	March 14, 2003	2–4	Tampa Bay Lightning (2002–03)	21–33–9–7	L
71	March 15, 2003	3–5	@ Atlanta Thrashers (2002–03)	21–34–9–7	L
72	March 18, 2003	5–2	Philadelphia Flyers (2002–03)	22–34–9–7	W
73	March 19, 2003	0–3	@ New York Rangers (2002–03)	22–35–9–7	L
74	March 22, 2003	2–3 OT	@ Toronto Maple Leafs (2002–03)	22–35–9–8	OTL
75	March 24, 2003	4–3 OT	Colorado Avalanche (2002–03)	23–35–9–8	W
76	March 26, 2003	2–1	Florida Panthers (2002–03)	24–35–9–8	W
77	March 28, 2003	4–1	Montreal Canadiens (2002–03)	25–35–9–8	W
78	March 29, 2003	3–1	@ Carolina Hurricanes (2002–03)	26–35–9–8	W
79	March 31, 2003	0–3	@ Dallas Stars (2002–03)	26–36–9–8	L

April: 1–1–1–0 (home: 1–0–1–0; road: 0–1–0–0)

Game	Date	Score	Opponent	Record	Recap
80	April 2, 2003	4–3	Atlanta Thrashers (2002–03)	27–36–9–8	W
81	April 5, 2003	5–8	@ Boston Bruins (2002–03)	27–37–9–8	L
82	April 6, 2003	2–2 OT	New Jersey Devils (2002–03)	27–37–10–8	T

Legend: W Win (2 points) L Loss (0 points) T Tie (1 point) OTL Overtime loss (1 point)

== Player statistics ==
=== Scoring ===
- Position abbreviations: C = Center; D = Defense; G = Goaltender; LW = Left wing; RW = Right wing
- † = Joined team via a transaction (e.g., trade, waivers, signing) during the season. Stats reflect time with the Sabres only.
- ‡ = Left team via a transaction (e.g., trade, waivers, release) during the season. Stats reflect time with the Sabres only.

No.	Player	Pos	Regular season					
No.	Player	Pos	GP	G	A	Pts	+/-	PIM
81	Miroslav Satan	LW	79	26	49	75	−3	20
77	Chris Gratton‡	C	66	15	29	44	−5	86
12	Ales Kotalik	RW	68	21	14	35	−2	30
17	Jean-Pierre Dumont	RW	76	14	21	35	−14	44
41	Stu Barnes‡	C	68	11	21	32	−13	20
37	Curtis Brown	C	74	15	16	31	4	40
24	Taylor Pyatt	LW	78	14	14	28	−8	38
71	Jochen Hecht	LW	49	10	16	26	4	30
18	Tim Connolly	C	80	12	13	25	−28	32
45	Dmitri Kalinin	D	65	8	13	21	−7	57
44	Alexei Zhitnik	D	70	3	18	21	−5	85
51	Brian Campbell	D	65	2	17	19	−8	20
22	Adam Mair	C	79	6	11	17	−4	146
3	James Patrick	D	69	4	12	16	−3	26
10	Henrik Tallinder	D	46	3	10	13	−3	28
48	Daniel Briere†	C	14	7	5	12	1	12
25	Vaclav Varada‡	RW	44	7	4	11	−2	23
61	Maxim Afinogenov	RW	35	5	6	11	−12	21
4	Rhett Warrener	D	50	0	9	9	1	63
26	Eric Boulton	LW	58	1	5	6	1	178
28	Jason Botterill	LW	17	1	4	5	1	14
74	Jay McKee	D	59	0	5	5	−16	49
8	Rory Fitzpatrick	D	36	1	3	4	−7	16
16	Chris Taylor	C	11	1	3	4	−1	2
5	Jason Woolley‡	D	14	0	3	3	−1	29
55	Denis Hamel	LW	25	2	0	2	−4	17
19	Norm Milley	RW	8	0	2	2	−2	6
15	Milan Bartovic	RW	3	1	0	1	0	0
43	Martin Biron	G	54	0	1	1		12
60	Paul Gaustad	C	1	0	0	0	0	0
21	Radoslav Hecl	D	14	0	0	0	0	2
6	Doug Houda	D	1	0	0	0	−2	2
33	Doug Janik	D	6	0	0	0	1	2
29	Jaroslav Kristek	RW	6	0	0	0	−2	4
23	Sean McMorrow	LW	1	0	0	0	0	0
30	Ryan Miller	G	15	0	0	0		0
35	Mika Noronen	G	16	0	0	0		0
32	Rob Ray‡	RW	41	0	0	0	−5	92

=== Goaltending ===
No.	Player	Regular season									
No.	Player	GP	W	L	T	SA	GA	GAA	SV%	SO	TOI
43	Martin Biron	54	17	28	6	1468	135	2.56	.908	4	3169:33
30	Ryan Miller	15	6	8	1	410	40	2.63	.902	1	912:19
35	Mika Noronen	16	4	9	3	411	36	2.42	.912	1	891:21

== Awards and records ==
=== Awards ===
Type	Award/honor	Recipient	Ref
League (in-season)	NHL All-Star Game selection	Miroslav Satan (Note: Satan was an injury replacement for Mats Sundin of the Toronto Maple Leafs.)	
League (in-season)	NHL Player of the Week	Miroslav Satan (December 9)	
League (in-season)	NHL Rookie of the Month	Ales Kotalik (January)	
League (in-season)	NHL YoungStars Game selection	Ryan Miller	
League (in-season)	NHL YoungStars Game selection	Taylor Pyatt	
League (in-season)	NHL YoungStars Game selection	Henrik Tallinder	

=== Milestones ===
Milestone	Player	Date	Ref
First game	Ryan Miller	November 19, 2002	
First game	Radoslav Hecl	November 30, 2002	
First game	Jaroslav Kristek	January 10, 2003	
First game	Doug Janik	March 14, 2003	
First game	Sean McMorrow	March 22, 2003	
First game	Paul Gaustad	March 24, 2003	
First game	Milan Bartovic	April 2, 2003	

== Transactions ==
The Sabres were involved in the following transactions from June 14, 2002, the day after the deciding game of the 2002 Stanley Cup Finals, through June 9, 2003, the day of the deciding game of the 2003 Stanley Cup Finals.

=== Trades ===
Date	Details		Ref
June 22, 2002	To Buffalo Sabres: 1st-round pick in 2002	To Columbus Blue Jackets: Rights to Mike Pandolfo; 1st-round pick in 2002	
June 22, 2002	To Buffalo Sabres: 2nd-round pick in 2002; 3rd-round pick in 2002	To Atlanta Thrashers: Vyacheslav Kozlov; 2nd-round pick in 2002	
June 22, 2002	To Buffalo Sabres: 2nd-round pick in 2002	To Nashville Predators: 3rd-round pick in 2002; 2nd-round pick in 2003	
June 22, 2002	To Buffalo Sabres: Jochen Hecht	To Edmonton Oilers: Atlanta’s 2nd-round pick in 2002; Nashville’s 2nd-round pick in 2002	
July 24, 2002	To Buffalo Sabres: Adam Mair; 5th-round pick in 2003	To Los Angeles Kings: Erik Rasmussen	
November 16, 2002	To Buffalo Sabres: Future considerations	To Detroit Red Wings: Jason Woolley	
February 25, 2003	To Buffalo Sabres: Rights to Jakub Klepis	To Ottawa Senators: Vaclav Varada; 5th-round pick in 2003	
March 10, 2003	To Buffalo Sabres: Future considerations	To Ottawa Senators: Rob Ray	
March 10, 2003	To Buffalo Sabres: Rights to Michael Ryan; 2nd-round pick in 2003	To Dallas Stars: Stu Barnes	
March 11, 2003	To Buffalo Sabres: Daniel Briere; 3rd-round pick in 2004	To Phoenix Coyotes: Chris Gratton; 4th-round pick in 2004	

=== Players acquired ===
Date	Player	Former team	Term	Via	Ref
August 7, 2002	Peter Ratchuk	Pittsburgh Penguins		Free agency	
August 12, 2002	Jason Botterill	Calgary Flames		Free agency	

=== Players lost ===
Date	Player	New team	Via (Note: In parentheses is the player's free agency group on July 1 if applicable.)	Ref
June 14, 2002	Christian Matte	ZSC Lions (NLA)	Free agency (VI)	
July 10, 2002	Richard Smehlik	Atlanta Thrashers	Free agency (III)	
July 29, 2002	Darren Van Oene	Boston Bruins	Free agency (UFA)	
August 3, 2002	Bob Corkum		Retirement (III)	
August 18, 2002	Mike Hurlbut		Retirement (VI)	
September 10, 2002	Bob Essensa		Retirement (III)	
N/A	Mario Larocque	Wilkes-Barre/Scranton Penguins (AHL)	Free agency (UFA)	
October 2, 2002	Luc Theoret	Bossier-Shreveport Mudbugs (CHL)	Free agency (UFA)	
December 3, 2002	Jeremy Adduono	Bridgeport Sound Tigers (AHL)	Free agency (II)	

=== Signings ===
Date	Player	Term	Contract type	Ref
June 27, 2002	Curtis Brown	1-year	Option exercised	
June 27, 2002	Jay McKee	1-year	Option exercised	
July 3, 2002	Rob Ray	1-year	Re-signing	
July 12, 2002	Mika Noronen	multi-year	Re-signing	
July 25, 2002	James Patrick	2-year	Re-signing	
July 30, 2002	Tim Connolly	1-year	Re-signing	
July 31, 2002	Brian Campbell		Re-signing	
July 31, 2002	Chris Gratton		Re-signing	
July 31, 2002	Rhett Warrener		Re-signing	
August 7, 2002	Rory Fitzpatrick		Re-signing	
August 8, 2002	Martin Biron	2-year	Re-signing	
August 8, 2002	Radoslav Hecl		Entry-level	
August 8, 2002	Jason Pominville		Entry-level	
August 12, 2002	Francois Methot		Re-signing	
August 26, 2002	Ryan Miller	2-year	Entry-level	
September 4, 2002	Maxim Afinogenov	multi-year	Re-signing	
September 18, 2002	Jiri Novotny	multi-year	Entry-level	
October 8, 2002	Vaclav Varada		Re-signing	
May 28, 2003	Derek Roy		Entry-level	
May 28, 2003	Chris Thorburn		Entry-level	

== Draft picks ==
Buffalo's draft picks at the 2002 NHL entry draft held at the Air Canada Centre in Toronto, Ontario.

Round	#	Player	Nationality	College/Junior/Club team (League)
1	11	Keith Ballard	United States	University of Minnesota (WCHA)
1	20	Daniel Paille	Canada	Guelph Storm (OHL)
3	76	Michael Tessier	Canada	Acadie-Bathurst Titan (QMJHL)
3	82	John Adams	United States	Boston College (Hockey East)
4	108	Jakub Hulva	Czech Republic	HC Vitkovice Jr. (Czech Republic)
4	121	Marty Magers	United States	Omaha Lancers (USHL)
6	178	Maxim Shchevyev	Russia	Elemash Elektrostal (Russia)
7	208	Radoslav Hecl	Slovakia	Slovan Bratislava (Slovakia)
8	241	Dennis Wideman	Canada	London Knights (OHL)
9	271	Martin Cizek	Czech Republic	Slavia Prague Jr. (Czech Republic)

== See also ==
- 2002–03 NHL season
