= Evgeny Konstantinov =

Russian ice hockey player

- Born: March 29, 1981 (age 45) Kazan, Soviet Union
- Height: 6 ft 1 in (185 cm)
- Weight: 203 lb (92 kg; 14 st 7 lb)
- Position: Goaltender
- Caught: Left
- Played for: HC MVD; HC Dynamo Moscow; Ak Bars Kazan; Tampa Bay Lightning
- National team: Russia
- NHL draft: 67th overall, 1999; Tampa Bay Lightning
- Playing career: 1999–2016

Yevgeni Valerievich Konstantinov (born March 29, 1981) is a Russian former professional ice hockey goaltender.

Konstantinov was drafted by the Tampa Bay Lightning in the third round, 67th overall, of the 1999 NHL entry draft. He played in two NHL games while with the Lightning.

As a youth, he played in the 1995 Quebec International Pee-Wee Hockey Tournament with a team combined from Yaroslavl and Kharkiv.

== Career statistics ==
=== Regular season and playoffs ===
| | | | Regular season | | | | | | | | | Playoffs |
| Season | Team | League | GP | W | L | T | MIN | GA | SO | GAA | SV% | GP | W | L | MIN | GA | SO | GAA | SV% |
|---|---|---|---|---|---|---|---|---|---|---|---|---|---|---|---|---|---|---|---|
| 1996–97 | Torpedo Yaroslavl-2 | RUS-3 | 1 | — | — | — | — | — | — | — | — | — | — | — | — | — | — | — | — |
| 1997–98 | Ak Bars Kazan-2 | RUS-3 | 34 | — | — | — | 2040 | 129 | — | 3.79 | — | — | — | — | — | — | — | — | — |
| 1998–99 | Ak Bars Kazan-2 | RUs-3 | 17 | — | — | — | 1020 | 38 | — | 2.24 | — | — | — | — | — | — | — | — | — |
| 1999–00 | Ak Bars Kazan | RSL | 2 | — | — | — | 59 | 5 | 0 | 5.08 | .808 | — | — | — | — | — | — | — | — |
| 1999–00 | Ak Bars Kazan-3 | HE | 9 | — | — | — | — | 30 | — | — | — | — | — | — | — | — | — | — | — |
| 1999–00 | Neftyanik Leninogorsk | RUS-2 | 34 | 13 | 14 | 5 | — | — | — | 2.73 | — | — | — | — | — | — | — | — | — |
| 2000–01 | Tampa Bay Lightning | NHL | 1 | 0 | 0 | 0 | 1 | 0 | 0 | 0.00 | 1.000 | — | — | — | — | — | — | — | — |
| 2000–01 | Detroit Vipers | IHL | 27 | 4 | 15 | 2 | 1197 | 85 | 0 | 4.26 | .858 | — | — | — | — | — | — | — | — |
| 2000–01 | Louisiana IceGators | ECHL | 8 | 4 | 4 | 0 | 458 | 21 | 0 | 2.75 | .911 | 12 | 5 | 6 | 637 | 32 | 0 | 3.01 | .899 |
| 2001–02 | Pensacola Ice Pilots | ECHL | 24 | 10 | 10 | 0 | 1229 | 71 | 2 | 3.47 | .901 | — | — | — | — | — | — | — | — |
| 2001–02 | Springfield Falcons | AHL | 3 | 1 | 2 | 0 | 178 | 5 | 0 | 1.69 | .926 | — | — | — | — | — | — | — | — |
| 2002–03 | Tampa Bay Lightning | NHL | 1 | 0 | 0 | 0 | 20 | 1 | 0 | 3.00 | .833 | — | — | — | — | — | — | — | — |
| 2002–03 | Springfield Falcons | AHL | 39 | 13 | 23 | 1 | 2188 | 118 | 1 | 3.24 | .889 | — | — | — | — | — | — | — | — |
| 2003–04 | Pensacola Ice Pilots | ECHL | 12 | 2 | 6 | 2 | 651 | 40 | 1 | 3.68 | .903 | — | — | — | — | — | — | — | — |
| 2003–04 | Severstal Cherepovets-2 | RUS-3 | 1 | 1 | 0 | 0 | 60 | 2 | 0 | 2.00 | — | — | — | — | — | — | — | — | — |
| 2004–05 | Dinamo-Energija Yekaterinburg | RUS-2 | 4 | 1 | 1 | 1 | 225 | 13 | 0 | 3.47 | .912 | — | — | — | — | — | — | — | — |
| 2004–05 | Dynamo Moscow-2 | RUS-3 | 1 | — | — | — | — | — | — | — | — | — | — | — | — | — | — | — | — |
| 2005–06 | Dynamo Moscow | RSL | 4 | 1 | 1 | 0 | 165 | 12 | 0 | 4.34 | .831 | — | — | — | — | — | — | — | — |
| 2005–06 | Kapitan Stupino | RUS-2 | 11 | — | — | — | — | — | — | 2.42 | — | — | — | — | — | — | — | — | — |
| 2006–07 | MVD Podolsk | RSL | 27 | 10 | 5 | 1 | — | — | — | 3.10 | .897 | — | — | — | — | — | — | — | — |
| 2007–08 | MVD Podolsk | RSL | 8 | 3 | 3 | 0 | — | — | — | 2.84 | .903 | — | — | — | — | — | — | — | — |
| 2007–08 | MVD Podolsk-2 | RUS-3 | 2 | — | — | — | — | — | — | — | — | — | — | — | — | — | — | — | — |
| 2008–09 | HC MVD | KHL | 12 | 6 | 2 | 1 | 547 | 21 | 1 | 2.30 | .902 | — | — | — | — | — | — | — | — |
| 2009–10 | Molot-Prikamye Perm | RUS-2 | 7 | 5 | 0 | 0 | — | — | — | 1.93 | — | — | — | — | — | — | — | — | — |
| 2011–12 | Berkut Kyiv | UKR | 5 | — | — | — | — | — | — | — | .860 | — | — | — | — | — | — | — | — |
| KHL totals | | | 12 | 6 | 2 | 1 | 547 | 21 | 1 | 2.30 | .902 | — | — | — | — | — | — | — | — |
| NHL totals | | | 2 | 0 | 0 | 0 | 21 | 1 | 0 | 2.94 | .833 | — | — | — | — | — | — | — | — |

=== International ===
| Year | Team | Event | GP | W | L | T | MIN | GA | SO | GAA | SV% |
|---|---|---|---|---|---|---|---|---|---|---|---|
| 1998 | Russia | EJC | 1 | — | — | — | — | 1 | 0 | 1.00 | .875 |
| 1999 | Russia | U18 | 6 | — | — | — | 340 | 13 | 1 | 2.29 | .903 |
| Junior totals | | | 7 | — | — | — | — | 13 | 1 | — | — |
