= Martin Chabada =

Czech professional ice hockey player

- Born: June 14, 1977 (age 48) Kladno, Czechoslovakia
- Height: 6 ft 1 in (185 cm)
- Weight: 187 lb (85 kg; 13 st 5 lb)
- Position: Left wing
- Shot: Right
- CZE.1 team Former teams: HC Litoměřice; HC Sparta Praha; Bridgeport Sound Tigers; Luleå HF; Södertälje SK; Lev Poprad; EHC Biel
- NHL draft: 252nd overall, 2002; New York Islanders
- Playing career: 1997–2014

Martin Chabada (born June 14, 1977) is a Czech professional ice hockey player currently with HC Litoměřice of the 1. národní hokejová liga (CZE.1). He has formerly played with HC Sparta Praha of the Czech Extraliga and Luleå HF in the Swedish Hockey League. He was originally drafted 252nd overall in the 2002 NHL entry draft by the New York Islanders.

== Career statistics ==
			Regular season					Playoffs
Season	Team	League	GP	G	A	Pts	PIM	GP	G	A	Pts	PIM
1994–95	HC Sparta Praha	CZE U18	20					—	—	—	—	—
1994–95	HC Sparta Praha	CZE U20	36	20	17	37	37	—	—	—	—	—
1995–96	HC Sparta Praha	CZE U20	29	29	19	48		—	—	—	—	—
1996–97	HC Sparta Praha	CZE U20	23	13	13	26		—	—	—	—	—
1996–97	HC Sparta Praha	ELH	14	1	2	3	4	4	0	1	1	2
1997–98	HC Sparta Praha	ELH	40	7	11	18	30	11	1	0	1	4
1997–98	HC Kometa Brno	CZE.2	10	7	7	14	6	—	—	—	—	—
1998–99	HC Sparta Praha	ELH	39	3	9	12	12	1	0	0	0	0
1998–99	HK Kaučuk Kralupy nad Vltavou	CZE.2	1	0	0	0	0	—	—	—	—	—
1999–2000	HC Sparta Praha	ELH	35	7	12	19	12	9	2	2	4	4
2000–01	HC Sparta Praha	ELH	43	9	10	19	36	12	0	0	0	8
2001–02	HC Sparta Praha	ELH	51	19	21	40	113	13	4	7	11	4
2002–03	Bridgeport Sound Tigers	AHL	66	17	13	30	50	9	3	4	7	4
2003–04	Bridgeport Sound Tigers	AHL	10	2	3	5	0	—	—	—	—	—
2003–04	HC Sparta Praha	ELH	31	8	18	26	65	13	7	3	10	22
2004–05	HC Sparta Praha	ELH	50	19	15	34	84	5	0	2	2	16
2005–06	HC Sparta Praha	ELH	43	8	17	25	84	11	2	6	8	6
2006–07	Luleå HF	SEL	42	18	21	39	102	4	1	1	2	14
2007–08	Luleå HF	SEL	44	14	19	33	130	—	—	—	—	—
2008–09	Luleå HF	SEL	50	6	20	26	98	5	0	0	0	12
2009–10	Luleå HF	SEL	50	7	11	18	50	—	—	—	—	—
2010–11	Södertälje SK	SEL	45	7	10	17	28	—	—	—	—	—
2011–12	HC Lev Poprad	KHL	35	4	3	7	24	—	—	—	—	—
2011–12	EHC Biel	NLA	2	0	0	0	0	3	0	3	3	0
2013–14	HC Stadion Litoměřice	CZE.2	21	4	16	20	28	4	2	1	3	12
2020–21	HC Buldoci Neratovice	CZE.5	3	2	7	9	8	—	—	—	—	—
ELH totals			346	81	115	196	440	79	16	21	37	66
SEL totals			231	52	81	133	408	9	1	1	2	26
