= 2002–03 Philadelphia Flyers season =

NHL hockey team season

2002–03 Philadelphia Flyers
- Division: 2nd Atlantic
- Conference: 4th Eastern
- 2002–03 record: 45–20–13–4
- Home record: 21–10–8–2
- Road record: 24–10–5–2
- Goals for: 211
- Goals against: 166

Team information
- General manager: Bob Clarke
- Coach: Ken Hitchcock
- Captain: Keith Primeau
- Alternate captains: John LeClair; Mark Recchi
- Arena: First Union Center
- Average attendance: 19,325
- Minor league affiliates: Philadelphia Phantoms; Trenton Titans

Team leaders
- Goals: Jeremy Roenick (27)
- Assists: Mark Recchi (32); Jeremy Roenick (32)
- Points: Jeremy Roenick (59)
- Penalty minutes: Donald Brashear (161)
- Plus/minus: Eric Desjardins (+30)
- Wins: Roman Cechmanek (33)
- Goals against average: Roman Cechmanek (1.83)

The 2002–03 Philadelphia Flyers season was the franchise's 36th season in the National Hockey League (NHL). After a hard-fought seven-game victory over the Toronto Maple Leafs in the first round – their first playoff series win in three years – the Flyers were eliminated in six games by the Ottawa Senators in the Eastern Conference semifinals.

== Off-season ==
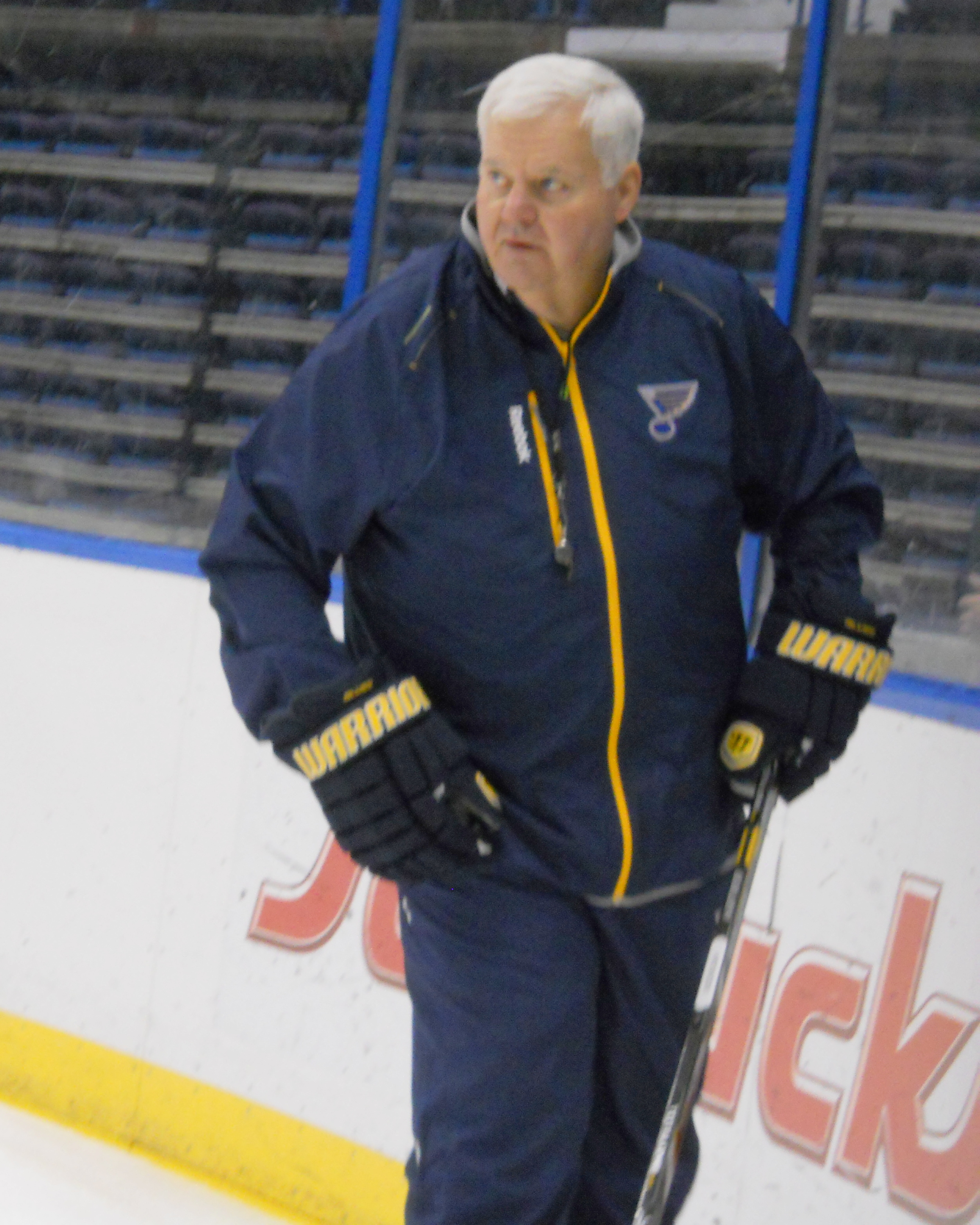
Ken Hitchcock, seen here in 2013, was hired as the 15th head coach in team history.

On May 14, the Flyers hired Stanley Cup-winning head coach Ken Hitchcock to replace Bill Barber, who was fired on April 30. Hitchcock, who had served as an assistant coach for the Flyers for three seasons from 1990 to 1993, had been fired three months earlier by the Dallas Stars midway through his seventh season as the team's head coach. Craig Hartsburg, head coach of the Sault Ste. Marie Greyhounds and a former Flyers assistant coach from 1990 to 1994, and Wayne Fleming, head coach of the Canadian national team, were hired as assistant coaches.

The Flyers made three trades in the ten days leading up to the 2002 NHL entry draft. On June 12, goaltender Brian Boucher and a 2002 third-round pick were traded to the Phoenix Coyotes for centerman Michal Handzus and goaltender Robert Esche, effectively cementing Roman Cechmanek as the Flyers' starting goaltender. Made expendable by Handzus' acquisition, centerman Jiri Dopita was traded to the Edmonton Oilers six days later for a 2003 third-round pick and a conditional 2004 draft pick.

A day before the draft the Flyers made a surprising trade that saw them acquire the fourth overall pick, which they used to select highly touted Finnish defenseman Joni Pitkanen, from the Tampa Bay Lightning in exchange for third-line winger Ruslan Fedotenko and two 2002 second-round picks. Though Tampa Bay received some criticism for what was seen as a light return for a high draft pick, the trade ultimately came back to haunt the Flyers two years later in the Eastern Conference finals, when Fedotenko scored six goals against them as the Lightning advanced to the 2004 Stanley Cup Final.

Philadelphia stood pat when free agency opened on July 1 and opted not to re-sign trade deadline acquisition Adam Oates as well as veteran defenseman Luke Richardson, both Group III unrestricted free agents. The Flyers received compensatory picks in the 2003 NHL entry draft from the league for both players after they signed with Anaheim and Columbus respectively, garnering a third-round pick for Oates and a fourth-round pick for Richardson.

== Regular season ==
The Flyers started the season strong amid a league-wide crackdown on obstruction, averaging four goals per game during October — including four six-goal outings — and posting a 9–1–2–0 record in their first twelve games. The stricter rules enforcement was short-lived, however, and Philadelphia in particular averaged only 2.4 goals per game from November through the end of the regular season.

The team hit a rough patch in November, managing just one win in a ten-game stretch — a 3–2 victory over Tampa Bay on November 19. Veteran winger John LeClair, off to a strong start with 11 goals in his first 21 games, suffered a dislocated shoulder on November 27 against Pittsburgh that kept him out of the lineup until March.

One of the highlights of the season occurred on December 5 against the New York Rangers when centerman Michal Handzus won the game on a penalty shot with less than a minute left in overtime to give the Flyers a 3–2 victory. Handzus became the second NHL player to ever score an overtime goal on a penalty shot, the first being David Legwand of the Nashville Predators two years earlier.

In early December, the Flyers swapped defensemen with the San Jose Sharks, sending Dan McGillis west in exchange for Marcus Ragnarsson. In his sixth season with the Flyers, McGillis' offensive production had dropped considerably since his career best 49-point season during the 2000–01 season while Ragnarsson was viewed as a steadier, stay-at-home defenseman who could better complement rookie Dennis Seidenberg and, later, the offensively inclined Kim Johnsson. Ragnarsson signed a two-year contract extension with the club in February.

Approaching the season's midway point, the Flyers started January with six straight wins as well as ten wins in their first eleven games of 2003 before losing four straight heading into the All-Star break. Injuries to young wingers Simon Gagne (groin strain) and Justin Williams (torn knee ligaments) forced both out of the lineup for extended periods, prompting the Flyers to acquire winger Sami Kapanen from Carolina on February 7.

Three more trades followed in the days leading up to March 11 trade deadline. On March 1, veteran defenseman and former Flyer Dmitri Yushkevich was acquired from the Los Angeles Kings for two draft picks. A week later, a fifth-round draft pick was sent to the New York Islanders for fourth-line centerman Claude Lapointe. The Flyers made their biggest move on the eve of the deadline, acquiring former 40-goal scorer Tony Amonte from Phoenix for prospect Guillaume Lefebvre, a 2003 third-round pick, and a 2004 second-round pick. These moves plus LeClair's return to the lineup spurred a 10–2–2–0 run that saw Philadelphia finish one point behind the New Jersey Devils for the division title.

The Flyers goaltending tandem of starter Roman Cechmanek and backup Robert Esche proved reliable during the regular season, combining for eight shutouts. Cechmanek, who had a club single season record 1.83 goals against average, was voted the team's most valuable player. The team tied New Jersey for the fewest goals allowed with just 166, earning Cechmanek and Esche a share of the William M. Jennings Trophy with Martin Brodeur. Philadelphia also boasted the league's best road record (24–10–5–2).

Jeremy Roenick led the team in scoring for the second straight season and reached two career milestones: his 600th assist and his 1,000th NHL game — the first of three Flyers to reach the latter mark that year. The others were defensemen Eric Desjardins and Eric Weinrich. In what was regarded as a return to form after a disappointing 2001–02 season, Desjardins was the team's plus-minus leader and voted best defenseman for the seventh time.

=== Season standings ===
Atlantic Division
No.	CR		GP	W	L	T	OTL	GF	GA	Pts
1	2	**New Jersey Devils**	82	46	20	10	6	216	166	108
2	4	**Philadelphia Flyers**	82	45	20	13	4	211	166	107
3	8	**New York Islanders**	82	35	34	11	2	224	231	83
4	9	New York Rangers	82	32	36	10	4	210	231	78
5	14	Pittsburgh Penguins	82	27	44	6	5	189	255	65

Note: CR = Conference rank; GP = Games played; W = Wins; L = Losses; T = Ties; OTL = Overtime loss; GF = Goals for; GA = Goals against; Pts = Points
Bolded teams qualified for the playoffs.

Eastern Conference
R		Div	GP	W	L	T	OTL	GF	GA	Pts
**1**	**P-** Ottawa Senators	**NE**	**82**	**52**	**21**	**8**	**1**	**263**	**182**	113
**2**	**Y-** New Jersey Devils	**AT**	**82**	**46**	**20**	**10**	**6**	**216**	**166**	108
**3**	**Y-** Tampa Bay Lightning	**SE**	**82**	**36**	**25**	**16**	**5**	**219**	**210**	93
**4**	**X-** Philadelphia Flyers	**AT**	**82**	**45**	**20**	**13**	**4**	**211**	**166**	107
**5**	**X-** Toronto Maple Leafs	**NE**	**82**	**44**	**28**	**7**	**3**	**236**	**208**	98
**6**	**X-** Washington Capitals	**SE**	**82**	**39**	**29**	**8**	**6**	**224**	**220**	92
**7**	**X-** Boston Bruins	**NE**	**82**	**36**	**31**	**11**	**4**	**245**	**237**	87
**8**	**X-** New York Islanders	**AT**	**82**	**35**	**34**	**11**	**2**	**224**	**231**	83
8.5
9	New York Rangers	AT	82	32	36	10	4	210	231	78
10	Montreal Canadiens	NE	82	30	35	8	9	206	234	77
11	Atlanta Thrashers	SE	82	31	39	7	5	226	284	74
12	Buffalo Sabres	NE	82	27	37	10	8	190	219	72
13	Florida Panthers	SE	82	24	36	13	9	176	237	70
14	Pittsburgh Penguins	AT	82	27	44	6	5	189	255	65
15	Carolina Hurricanes	SE	82	22	43	11	6	171	240	61

Divisions: AT – Atlantic, NE – Northeast, SE – Southeast

P – Clinched Presidents Trophy; Y – Clinched division; X – Clinched playoff spot

== Playoffs ==
=== Eastern Conference quarterfinals ===
Although the Flyers posted their highest point total (107) since 1985–86, they finished second in the Atlantic Division and entered the playoffs as the fourth seed, drawing a tough first-round matchup against the Toronto Maple Leafs. They held home-ice advantage and entered the series with a healthy lineup, as Simon Gagne and Justin Williams returned during the final week of the regular season.

In game one, the Flyers outplayed the Maple Leafs and held them to just 15 shots, but Toronto capitalized on their limited chances and won 5–3, with Alexander Mogilny sealing it with an empty-net goal — his third of the game. The Flyers dominated again in game two, this time winning 4–1 to tie the series.

The series shifted to Toronto and the Flyers jumped out to a 2–0 lead early in game three, but the game wasn't decided until double overtime, when Tomas Kaberle scored to give Toronto a 4–3 win. Philadelphia was once again dominant in game four, limiting Toronto to only 10 shots in regulation time, but the game finally ended in the third overtime when Mark Recchi scored the winner at 13:54 to tie the series again.

Back at home for game five, Sami Kapanen scored two power play goals in a 4–1 win to give the Flyers a 3–2 series lead. Defenseman Eric Desjardins broke his right foot in the third period, sidelining him for 2–4 weeks. He was replaced in the lineup by rookie Jim Vandermeer, who made his playoff debut in game six.

For the third time in the series, game six in Toronto was decided in overtime, Travis Green scoring the game-winner for the Maple Leafs in the second overtime period to force a game seven. Less than 24 hours later in Philadelphia, captain Keith Primeau ended a 26-game playoff goal drought — his previous goal having ended the five-overtime marathon against Pittsburgh on May 4, 2000 — and helped lead the Flyers to a 6–1 blowout win and their first playoff series victory in three years. Justin Williams' goal — credited as the game-winner — was his first career playoff goal, scored in his first game seven appearance. He would later earn the nickname "Mr. Game 7" for his prolific production in such games, eventually setting the NHL record for most game seven points and sharing the records for goals and wins.

=== Eastern Conference semifinals ===
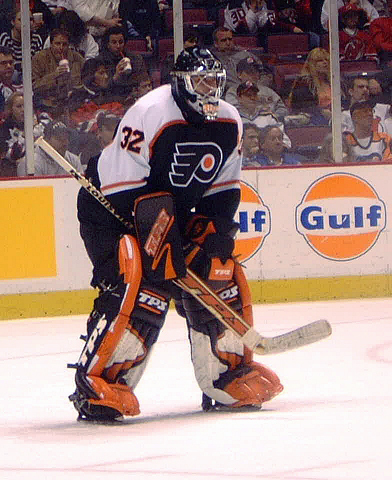
Despite out-dueling Toronto's Ed Belfour in the first round, starting goaltender Roman Cechmanek was traded less than a month after the team's second-round playoff exit.

The Flyers faced the Presidents' Trophy-winning Ottawa Senators in the second round, a rematch of their five-game loss in the 2002 quarterfinals. Although Philadelphia managed more than the record-low two goals they scored in that series, Ottawa again stifled their offense — holding the Flyers to two goals or fewer in all six games.

Philadelphia matched its 2002 goal total in the first period of game one alone, scoring on its first two shots against Senators goalie Patrick Lalime to take a 2–0 lead. But Ottawa answered with four straight goals to win 4–2. Following postgame criticism from head coach Ken Hitchcock, Roman Cechmanek rebounded in game two with a 33-save shutout in a 2–0 victory to even the series.

The series moved to Philadelphia for game three. The Flyers held a 2–1 lead entering the third period, but Ottawa tied the game in the opening minute and won in overtime on Wade Redden's goal at 6:43. Cechmanek responded again in game four, stopping all 28 shots he faced in a 1–0 shutout, with Michal Handzus scoring the lone goal to tie the series 2–2.

In game five, Ottawa capitalized on Cechmanek's struggles, scoring four goals on 16 shots and chasing him midway through the second period in a 5–2 win. With the series back in Philadelphia, the Senators struck early and often in game six, scoring the first four goals en route to a 5–1 victory to clinch the series.

Cechmanek's inconsistency was a major factor in the Flyers' elimination. While he posted shutouts in games two and four, his performances in games one, five, and six drew heavy criticism. He allowed nine goals in the final two games — both decisive losses that ended Philadelphia's season. A week later, general manager Bob Clarke indicated that both the team and Cechmanek had agreed it was time to move on. He was traded to the Los Angeles Kings three weeks after the deciding game, ending a three-year tenure in Philadelphia during which he ranked second in the NHL in goals-against average (1.96) and save percentage (.923), and third in shutouts (20).

== Schedule and results ==
=== Preseason ===
2002 preseason
Preseason: 5–4–0 (home: 2–1–0; road: 3–3–0)

Game	Date	Score	Opponent	Record	Recap
1	September 19	4–1	@ Washington Capitals	1–0–0	W
2	September 21	1–5	New Jersey Devils	1–1–0	L
3	September 22	4–6	@ New York Rangers	1–2–0	L
4	September 24	4–2	New York Islanders	2–2–0	W
5	September 26	0–4	@ New Jersey Devils	2–3–0	L
6	September 27	5–1	@ Carolina Hurricanes	3–3–0	W
7	October 1	5–3	New York Rangers	4–3–0	W
8	October 2	1–4	@ New York Islanders	4–4–0	L
9	October 5	3–2	Washington Capitals	5–4–0	W

Legend: W Win (2 points) L Loss (0 points) T Tie (1 point) OTL Overtime loss (1 point)

=== Regular season ===
2002–03 regular season
October: 7–1–2–0, 16 points (home: 4–0–1–0; road: 3–1–1–0)

Game	Date	Score	Opponent	Decision	Record	Points	Recap
1	October 10	2–2 OT	@ Edmonton Oilers	Cechmanek	0–0–1–0	1	T
2	October 12	5–4	@ Calgary Flames	Cechmanek	1–0–1–0	3	W
3	October 15	6–2	@ Montreal Canadiens	Cechmanek	2–0–1–0	5	W
4	October 17	3–3 OT	New York Islanders	Cechmanek	2–0–2–0	6	T
5	October 19	3–1	Washington Capitals	Esche	3–0–2–0	8	W
6	October 22	1–2	@ Buffalo Sabres	Cechmanek	3–1–2–0	8	L
7	October 24	6–2	Montreal Canadiens	Cechmanek	4–1–2–0	10	W
8	October 26	6–2	@ New York Islanders	Esche	5–1–2–0	12	W
9	October 29	2–1	Ottawa Senators	Cechmanek	6–1–2–0	14	W
10	October 31	6–2	Phoenix Coyotes	Esche	7–1–2–0	16	W

November: 4–5–4–0, 12 points (home: 1–2–3–0; road: 3–3–1–0)

Game	Date	Score	Opponent	Decision	Record	Points	Recap
11	November 2	2–1	Washington Capitals	Cechmanek	8–1–2–0	18	W
12	November 5	2–1 OT	@ Carolina Hurricanes	Cechmanek	9–1–2–0	20	W
13	November 7	0–1	New Jersey Devils	Cechmanek	9–2–2–0	20	L
14	November 9	1–4	@ Washington Capitals	Cechmanek	9–3–2–0	20	L
15	November 13	1–1 OT	Florida Panthers	Esche	9–3–3–0	21	T
16	November 15	1–1 OT	@ Carolina Hurricanes	Cechmanek	9–3–4–0	22	T
17	November 16	2–2 OT	Boston Bruins	Cechmanek	9–3–5–0	23	T
18	November 19	3–2	@ Tampa Bay Lightning	Cechmanek	10–3–5–0	25	W
19	November 21	2–2 OT	San Jose Sharks	Esche	10–3–6–0	26	T
20	November 23	0–6	@ Toronto Maple Leafs	Cechmanek	10–4–6–0	26	L
21	November 27	2–7	@ Pittsburgh Penguins	Cechmanek	10–5–6–0	26	L
22	November 29	0–3	Toronto Maple Leafs	Esche	10–6–6–0	26	L
23	November 30	2–1 OT	@ Montreal Canadiens	Cechmanek	11–6–6–0	28	W

December: 6–4–2–1, 15 points (home: 3–2–1–1; road: 3–2–1–0)

Game	Date	Score	Opponent	Decision	Record	Points	Recap
24	December 2	0–1 OT	New Jersey Devils	Cechmanek	11–6–6–1	29	OTL
25	December 5	3–2 OT	New York Rangers	Cechmanek	12–6–6–1	31	W
26	December 7	1–3	St. Louis Blues	Cechmanek	12–7–6–1	31	L
27	December 10	5–2	@ Florida Panthers	Esche	13–7–6–1	33	W
28	December 12	2–1	Toronto Maple Leafs	Cechmanek	14–7–6–1	35	W
29	December 14	2–0	Buffalo Sabres	Esche	15–7–6–1	37	W
30	December 17	2–2 OT	Dallas Stars	Cechmanek	15–7–7–1	38	T
31	December 18	3–1	@ Atlanta Thrashers	Esche	16–7–7–1	40	W
32	December 21	1–3	Ottawa Senators	Cechmanek	16–8–7–1	40	L
33	December 23	2–2 OT	@ Ottawa Senators	Esche	16–8–8–1	41	T
34	December 27	2–1 OT	@ Colorado Avalanche	Cechmanek	17–8–8–1	43	W
35	December 28	0–4	@ Phoenix Coyotes	Esche	17–9–8–1	43	L
36	December 30	1–2	@ San Jose Sharks	Cechmanek	17–10–8–1	43	L

January: 10–4–0–1, 21 points (home: 4–3–0–0; road: 6–1–0–1)

Game	Date	Score	Opponent	Decision	Record	Points	Recap
37	January 2	4–1	@ Los Angeles Kings	Cechmanek	18–10–8–1	45	W
38	January 3	1–0	@ Mighty Ducks of Anaheim	Esche	19–10–8–1	47	W
39	January 5	5–4	@ Atlanta Thrashers	Cechmanek	20–10–8–1	49	W
40	January 7	3–2	Buffalo Sabres	Esche	21–10–8–1	51	W
41	January 9	4–0	@ New York Islanders	Cechmanek	22–10–8–1	53	W
42	January 11	3–2	Detroit Red Wings	Cechmanek	23–10–8–1	55	W
43	January 13	4–7	Atlanta Thrashers	Cechmanek	23–11–8–1	55	L
44	January 16	4–1	Montreal Canadiens	Cechmanek	24–11–8–1	57	W
45	January 18	3–2	Tampa Bay Lightning	Esche	25–11–8–1	59	W
46	January 19	4–2	@ New York Rangers	Cechmanek	26–11–8–1	61	W
47	January 21	3–1	@ Toronto Maple Leafs	Cechmanek	27–11–8–1	63	W
48	January 24	1–3	New York Islanders	Esche	27–12–8–1	63	L
49	January 25	0–1 OT	@ Boston Bruins	Esche	27–12–8–2	64	OTL
50	January 28	0–3	Tampa Bay Lightning	Cechmanek	27–13–8–2	64	L
51	January 30	1–5	@ New Jersey Devils	Cechmanek	27–14–8–2	64	L

February: 6–3–3–0, 15 points (home: 3–2–2–0; road: 3–1–1–0)

Game	Date	Score	Opponent	Decision	Record	Points	Recap
52	February 4	2–1	@ New York Islanders	Cechmanek	28–14–8–2	66	W
53	February 6	2–2 OT	@ Ottawa Senators	Cechmanek	28–14–9–2	67	T
54	February 8	2–1	New York Rangers	Cechmanek	29–14–9–2	69	W
55	February 10	0–1	Minnesota Wild	Cechmanek	29–15–9–2	69	L
56	February 12	0–2	@ Minnesota Wild	Esche	29–16–9–2	69	L
57	February 13	4–3 OT	@ St. Louis Blues	Cechmanek	30–16–9–2	71	W
58	February 15	2–2 OT	Carolina Hurricanes	Cechmanek	30–16–10–2	72	T
59	February 18	2–2 OT	New Jersey Devils	Cechmanek	30–16–11–2	73	T
60	February 20	5–0	Los Angeles Kings	Cechmanek	31–16–11–2	75	W
61	February 22	2–4	Florida Panthers	Esche	31–17–11–2	75	L
62	February 25	2–0	@ Chicago Blackhawks	Cechmanek	32–17–11–2	77	W
63	February 27	5–2	Chicago Blackhawks	Cechmanek	33–17–11–2	79	W

March: 9–3–2–2, 22 points (home: 5–1–1–1; road: 4–2–1–1)

Game	Date	Score	Opponent	Decision	Record	Points	Recap
64	March 1	3–2 OT	@ Boston Bruins	Cechmanek	34–17–11–2	81	W
65	March 4	3–0	Vancouver Canucks	Cechmanek	35–17–11–2	83	W
66	March 7	1–5	@ New York Rangers	Cechmanek	35–18–11–2	83	L
67	March 8	1–2 OT	Colorado Avalanche	Cechmanek	35–18–11–3	84	OTL
68	March 10	1–2 OT	@ Washington Capitals	Esche	35–18–11–4	85	OTL
69	March 13	5–3	Carolina Hurricanes	Cechmanek	36–18–11–4	87	W
70	March 15	4–1	@ Pittsburgh Penguins	Cechmanek	37–18–11–4	89	W
71	March 17	4–2	@ New Jersey Devils	Cechmanek	38–18–11–4	91	W
72	March 18	2–5	@ Buffalo Sabres	Esche	38–19–11–4	91	L
73	March 20	4–2	Pittsburgh Penguins	Esche	39–19–11–4	93	W
74	March 22	1–2	New York Rangers	Esche	39–20–11–4	93	L
75	March 24	6–2	Atlanta Thrashers	Esche	40–20–11–4	95	W
76	March 25	1–1 OT	@ Nashville Predators	Cechmanek	40–20–12–4	96	T
77	March 27	2–2 OT	Boston Bruins	Cechmanek	40–20–13–4	97	T
78	March 29	3–0	Pittsburgh Penguins	Cechmanek	41–20–13–4	99	W
79	March 31	6–1	@ Pittsburgh Penguins	Cechmanek	42–20–13–4	101	W

April: 3–0–0–0, 6 points (home: 1–0–0–0; road: 2–0–0–0)

Game	Date	Score	Opponent	Decision	Record	Points	Recap
80	April 1	4–0	Columbus Blue Jackets	Cechmanek	43–20–13–4	103	W
81	April 4	4–1	@ Tampa Bay Lightning	Cechmanek	44–20–13–4	105	W
82	April 6	6–2	@ Florida Panthers	Esche	45–20–13–4	107	W

Legend: W Win (2 points) L Loss (0 points) T Tie (1 point) OTL Overtime loss (1 point)

=== Playoffs ===
2003 Stanley Cup playoffs
Eastern Conference quarterfinals vs. Toronto Maple Leafs - Flyers win 4–3

Game	Date	Score	Opponent	Decision	Attendance	Series	Recap
1	April 9	3–5	Toronto Maple Leafs	Cechmanek	18,937	Maple Leafs lead 1–0	L
2	April 11	4–1	Toronto Maple Leafs	Cechmanek	19,597	Series tied 1–1	W
3	April 14	3–4 2OT	@ Toronto Maple Leafs	Cechmanek	19,533	Maple Leafs lead 2–1	L
4	April 16	3–2 3OT	@ Toronto Maple Leafs	Cechmanek	19,574	Series tied 2–2	W
5	April 19	4–1	Toronto Maple Leafs	Cechmanek	19,828	Flyers lead 3–2	W
6	April 21	1–2 2OT	@ Toronto Maple Leafs	Cechmanek	19,573	Series tied 3–3	L
7	April 22	6–1	Toronto Maple Leafs	Cechmanek	19,870	Flyers win 4–3	W

Eastern Conference semifinals vs. Ottawa Senators - Senators win 4–2

Game	Date	Score	Opponent	Decision	Attendance	Series	Recap
1	April 25	2–4	@ Ottawa Senators	Cechmanek	18,197	Senators lead 1–0	L
2	April 27	2–0	@ Ottawa Senators	Cechmanek	18,500	Series tied 1–1	W
3	April 29	2–3 OT	Ottawa Senators	Cechmanek	19,680	Senators lead 2–1	L
4	May 1	1–0	Ottawa Senators	Cechmanek	19,842	Series tied 2–2	W
5	May 3	2–5	@ Ottawa Senators	Cechmanek	18,500	Senators lead 3–2	L
6	May 5	1–5	Ottawa Senators	Cechmanek	19,454	Senators win 4–2	L

Legend: W Win L Loss

== Player statistics ==
=== Scoring ===
- Position abbreviations: C = Center; D = Defense; G = Goaltender; LW = Left wing; RW = Right wing
- † = Joined team via a transaction (e.g., trade, waivers, signing) during the season. Stats reflect time with the Flyers only.
- ‡ = Left team via a transaction (e.g., trade, waivers, release) during the season. Stats reflect time with the Flyers only.

No.	Player	Pos	Regular season						Playoffs					
No.	Player	Pos	GP	G	A	Pts	+/-	PIM	GP	G	A	Pts	+/-	PIM
97	Jeremy Roenick	C	79	27	32	59	20	75	13	3	5	8	1	8
8	Mark Recchi	RW	79	20	32	52	0	35	13	7	3	10	4	2
25	Keith Primeau	C	80	19	27	46	4	93	13	1	1	2	−2	14
26	Michal Handzus	C	82	23	21	44	13	46	13	2	6	8	3	6
5	Kim Johnsson	D	82	10	29	39	11	38	13	0	3	3	−1	8
37	Eric Desjardins	D	79	8	24	32	30	35	5	2	1	3	2	0
10	John LeClair	LW	35	18	10	28	10	16	13	2	3	5	5	10
12	Simon Gagne	LW	46	9	18	27	20	16	13	4	1	5	1	6
39	Marty Murray	C	76	11	15	26	−1	13	4	0	0	0	−2	4
87	Donald Brashear	LW	80	8	17	25	5	161	13	1	2	3	−1	21
14	Justin Williams	RW	41	8	16	24	15	22	12	1	5	6	2	8
2	Eric Weinrich	D	81	2	18	20	16	40	13	2	3	5	−2	12
20	Radovan Somik	LW	60	8	10	18	9	10	5	1	1	2	0	6
11	Tony Amonte†	RW	13	7	8	15	12	2	13	1	6	7	2	4
24	Sami Kapanen†	RW	28	4	9	13	−1	6	13	4	3	7	2	6
36	Dennis Seidenberg	D	58	4	9	13	8	20	—	—	—	—	—	—
55	Pavel Brendl‡	RW	42	5	7	12	8	4	—	—	—	—	—	—
19	Eric Chouinard†	C	28	4	4	8	2	2	—	—	—	—	—	—
28	Marcus Ragnarsson†	D	43	2	6	8	5	32	13	0	1	1	4	6
6	Chris Therien	D	67	1	6	7	10	36	13	0	2	2	0	2
29	Todd Fedoruk	LW	63	1	5	6	1	105	1	0	0	0	0	0
15	Joe Sacco†	RW	34	1	5	6	0	20	4	0	0	0	−2	0
18	Todd Warriner†‡	LW	13	2	3	5	2	6	—	—	—	—	—	—
13	Claude Lapointe†	C	14	2	2	4	5	16	13	2	3	5	0	14
22	Dmitri Yushkevich†	D	18	2	2	4	7	8	13	1	4	5	7	2
19	Paul Ranheim‡	RW	28	0	4	4	−4	6	—	—	—	—	—	—
27	Andre Savage	C	16	2	1	3	2	4	—	—	—	—	—	—
23	Jim Vandermeer	D	24	2	1	3	9	27	8	0	1	1	1	9
3	Dan McGillis‡	D	24	0	3	3	7	20	—	—	—	—	—	—
18	Tomi Kallio†‡	RW	7	1	0	1	−1	2	—	—	—	—	—	—
9	Mark Greig	RW	5	0	1	1	1	2	—	—	—	—	—	—
32	Roman Cechmanek	G	58	0	0	0		8	13	0	0	0		0
42	Robert Esche	G	30	0	0	0		6	1	0	0	0		0
47	Kirby Law	RW	2	0	0	0	0	2	—	—	—	—	—	—
17	Guillaume Lefebvre‡	LW	14	0	0	0	1	4	—	—	—	—	—	—
34	Ian MacNeil	C	2	0	0	0	1	0	—	—	—	—	—	—
24	Chris McAllister‡	D	19	0	0	0	−2	21	—	—	—	—	—	—
18 (Note: Sharp wore number 51 in the season opener and number 11 in his second game.)	Patrick Sharp	C	3	0	0	0	0	2	—	—	—	—	—	—
21	Mike Siklenka†	RW	1	0	0	0	0	0	—	—	—	—	—	—
22	Bruno St. Jacques‡	D	6	0	0	0	−1	2	—	—	—	—	—	—
18	Jamie Wright†	LW	4	0	0	0	−1	4	—	—	—	—	—	—

=== Goaltending ===
No.	Player	Regular season											Playoffs									
No.	Player	GP	GS	W	L	T	SA	GA	GAA	SV%	SO	TOI	GP	GS	W	L	SA	GA	GAA	SV%	SO	TOI
32	Roman Cechmanek	58	57	33	15	10	1368	102	1.83	.925	6	3,350	13	13	6	7	339	31	2.14	.909	2	867
42	Robert Esche	30	25	12	9	3	647	60	2.20	.907	2	1,638	1	0	0	0	14	1	2.00	.929	0	30

== Awards and records ==
=== Awards ===
Type	Award/honor	Recipient	Ref
League (annual)	William M. Jennings Trophy	Roman Cechmanek (Note: Co-winners with Martin Brodeur of the New Jersey Devils.)	
League (annual)	William M. Jennings Trophy	Robert Esche	
League (in-season)	NHL All-Star Game selection	Ken Hitchcock (coach)	
League (in-season)	NHL All-Star Game selection	Jeremy Roenick	
League (in-season)	NHL YoungStars Game selection	Pavel Brendl	
League (in-season)	NHL YoungStars Game selection	Dennis Seidenberg	
Team	Barry Ashbee Trophy	Eric Desjardins	
Team	Bobby Clarke Trophy	Roman Cechmanek	
Team	Pelle Lindbergh Memorial Trophy	Donald Brashear	
Team	Toyota Cup	Keith Primeau	
Team	Yanick Dupre Memorial Class Guy Award	Robert Esche	

=== Records ===
Several team records were set during the 2002–03 season. On October 15, John LeClair scored four goals against the Montreal Canadiens, tying the franchise record for most goals in a regular season game. Eleven days later, on October 26, the Flyers set a team record for the fastest two goals from the start of a game (31 seconds), which also tied the mark for fastest two goals from the start of any period. Goaltender Roman Cechmanek finished the regular season with a 1.83 goals-against average, setting a new team record.

In the playoffs, during game four of the Eastern Conference quarterfinals against the Toronto Maple Leafs, the Flyers set franchise records for most shots on goal in a game (75) and most shots in a single overtime period (15). The series featured three overtime games, setting a team record for the most in a single playoff series — a mark later tied during the second round of the 2020 Stanley Cup playoffs against the New York Islanders.

=== Milestones ===
Milestone	Player	Date	Ref
First game	Dennis Seidenberg	October 10, 2002	
First game	Patrick Sharp	October 10, 2002	
First game	Radovan Somik	October 15, 2002	
First game	Ian MacNeil	December 18, 2002	
First game	Jim Vandermeer	January 3, 2003	
First game	Mike Siklenka	January 28, 2003	
1,000th game played	Jeremy Roenick	November 16, 2002	
1,000th game played	Eric Desjardins	December 18, 2002	
1,000th game played	Eric Weinrich	March 31, 2003	
600th assist	Jeremy Roenick	January 9, 2003	

== Transactions ==
The Flyers were involved in the following transactions from June 14, 2002, the day after the deciding game of the 2002 Stanley Cup Final, through June 9, 2003, the day of the deciding game of the 2003 Stanley Cup Final.

=== Trades ===
Date	Details		Ref
June 18, 2002	To Philadelphia Flyers: 3rd-round pick in 2003; Conditional 5th-round pick in 2004 (Note: Condition not met. The Flyers would have received the Oilers' 2004 fifth-round pick if Dopita re-signed with Edmonton for the 2003–04 season. Dopita returned to Europe after being released by Edmonton on December 28.)	To Edmonton Oilers: Jiri Dopita	
June 21, 2002	To Philadelphia Flyers: 1st-round pick in 2002	To Tampa Bay Lightning: Ruslan Fedotenko; Tampa Bay's 2nd-round pick in 2002; Phoenix's 2nd-round pick in 2002	
June 22, 2002	To Philadelphia Flyers: 6th-round pick in 2002; 3rd-round pick in 2003	To Carolina Hurricanes: Carolina's 3rd-round pick in 2002	
June 23, 2002	To Philadelphia Flyers: 5th-round pick in 2003	To Columbus Blue Jackets: Vancouver's 6th-round pick in 2002; 7th-round pick in 2002	
December 6, 2002	To Philadelphia Flyers: Marcus Ragnarsson	To San Jose Sharks: Dan McGillis	
December 19, 2002	To Philadelphia Flyers: Conditional draft pick in 2004 (Note: Condition not met. The Flyers would have received a late round draft pick (sixth-to-eighth-round pick) if the Coyotes re-signed Ranheim for the 2003–04 season.)	To Phoenix Coyotes: Paul Ranheim	
January 22, 2003	To Philadelphia Flyers: Jamie Wright	To Calgary Flames: Future considerations	
January 29, 2003	To Philadelphia Flyers: Eric Chouinard	To Montreal Canadiens: 2nd-round pick in 2003	
February 5, 2003	To Philadelphia Flyers: 6th-round pick in 2003	To Colorado Avalanche: Chris McAllister	
February 5, 2003	To Philadelphia Flyers: Todd Warriner	To Vancouver Canucks: Conditional draft pick (Note: Condition not met.)	
February 7, 2003	To Philadelphia Flyers: Ryan Bast; Sami Kapanen	To Carolina Hurricanes: Pavel Brendl; Bruno St. Jacques	
March 1, 2003	To Philadelphia Flyers: Dmitri Yushkevich	To Los Angeles Kings: 4th-round pick in 2003; 7th-round pick in 2004	
March 9, 2003	To Philadelphia Flyers: Claude Lapointe	To New York Islanders: 5th-round pick in 2003	
March 10, 2003	To Philadelphia Flyers: Tony Amonte	To Phoenix Coyotes: Guillaume Lefebvre; Atlanta's 3rd-round pick in 2003; 2nd-round pick in 2004	
March 11, 2003	To Philadelphia Flyers: Peter White	To Chicago Blackhawks: Future considerations	
May 28, 2003	To Philadelphia Flyers: 2nd-round pick in 2004	To Los Angeles Kings: Roman Cechmanek	

=== Players acquired ===
Date	Player	Former team	Term	Via	Ref
July 2, 2002	Ian MacNeil	Carolina Hurricanes		Free agency	
July 4, 2002	Andre Savage	Vancouver Canucks		Free agency	
July 29, 2002	Jeff Smith	Red Deer Rebels (WHL)	3-year	Free agency	
January 1, 2003	Tomi Kallio	Columbus Blue Jackets		Waivers	
January 15, 2003	Joe Sacco	Philadelphia Phantoms (AHL)	1-year	Free agency	
January 27, 2003	Mike Siklenka	Philadelphia Phantoms (AHL)	1-year	Free agency	
May 21, 2003	Nick Deschenes	Yale University (ECAC)		Free agency	
May 21, 2003	Freddy Meyer	Boston University (HE)		Free agency	

=== Players lost ===
Date	Player	New team	Via (Note: In parentheses is the player's free agency group on July 1 if applicable.)	Ref
July 1, 2002	James Chalmers (Note: Chalmers retired.)		Contract expiration (UFA)	
July 1, 2002	Adam Oates	Mighty Ducks of Anaheim	Free agency (III)	
July 4, 2002	Luke Richardson	Columbus Blue Jackets	Free agency (III)	
July 15, 2002	Greg Koehler	Nashville Predators	Free agency (VI)	
July 21, 2002	Tomas Divisek	HC Pardubice (ELH)	Free agency (II) (Note: The Flyers retained Divisek's NHL rights through the 2007–08 season.)	
July 30, 2002	Vaclav Pletka	HC Ocelari Trinec (ELH)	Free agency (Note: The Flyers retained Pletka's NHL rights until trading them to Chicago on August 2, 2006.)	
August 9, 2002	Mike Watt	Carolina Hurricanes	Free agency (II)	
October 11, 2002	Yves Sarault	Springfield Falcons (AHL)	Free agency (V)	
January 15, 2003	Rick Tocchet		Retirement (III) (Note: Tocchet was named an assistant coach of the Colorado Avalanche.)	
January 16, 2003	Tomi Kallio	Frolunda HC (SHL) (Note: Kallio signed with Frolunda on January 21.)	Release	
March 11, 2003	Todd Warriner	Nashville Predators	Waivers	
May 28, 2003	Mark Greig	Hamburg Freezers (DEL)	Free agency	

=== Signings ===
Date	Player	Term	Contract type	Ref
N/A	Radovan Somik	1-year	Signing	
June 25, 2002	Jeff Woywitka	3-year	Entry-level	
July 12, 2002	Donald Brashear	4-year	Re-signing	
July 12, 2002	Todd Fedoruk	3-year	Re-signing	
July 17, 2002	David Harlock		Re-signing	
July 17, 2002	Kirby Law		Re-signing	
July 27, 2002	Dennis Seidenberg	3-year	Entry-level	
August 8, 2002	Neil Little	multi-year	Re-signing	
August 8, 2002	John Slaney	multi-year	Re-signing	
September 11, 2002	Simon Gagne	2-year	Re-signing	
February 15, 2003	Marcus Ragnarsson	2-year	Extension	

== Draft picks ==
Philadelphia's picks at the 2002 NHL entry draft, which was held at the Air Canada Centre in Toronto, Ontario, on June 22–23, 2002. The Flyers traded their original first, 26th overall, second, 59th overall, and third-round picks, 92nd overall, and Maxime Ouellet to the Washington Capitals for Adam Oates on March 19, 2002. They also traded the Canucks' sixth-round pick, 184th overall, and their seventh-round pick, 225th overall, to the Columbus Blue Jackets for the Blue Jackets' 2003 fifth-round pick on June 23, 2002, and their eighth-round pick, 256th overall, to the Carolina Hurricanes for Paul Ranheim on May 31, 2000.

Round	Pick	Player	Position	Nationality	Team (league)	Notes
1	4	Joni Pitkanen	Defense	Finland	Oulun Karpat (SM-liiga)	(Note: The Flyers acquired the 4th overall pick from the Tampa Bay Lightning for Ruslan Fedotenko, the Lightning's second-round pick and the Phoenix Coyotes' second-round pick on June 21, 2002.)
4	105	Rosario Ruggeri	Defense	Canada	Chicoutimi Sagueneens (QMJHL)	(Note: The Flyers traded Dean McAmmond to the Calgary Flames for the Flames' fourth-round pick, 105th overall, on June 24, 2001.)
4	126	Konstantin Baranov	Forward	Russia	Mechel Chelyabinsk (RSL)	
5	161	Dov Grumet-Morris	Goaltender	United States	Harvard University (ECAC)	
6	192	Nikita Korovkin	Defense	Russia	Kamloops Blazers (WHL)	(Note: The Flyers traded their 2001 fourth-round pick to the Carolina Hurricanes for the Hurricanes' third-round pick, 91st overall, on June 24, 2001. The Flyers traded the Hurricanes' pick back to Carolina for the Hurricanes' sixth-round pick, 192nd overall, and the Hurricanes' 2003 third-round pick on June 22, 2002.)
6	193	Joey Mormina	Defense	Canada	Colgate University (ECAC)	
7	201	Mathieu Brunelle	Left wing	Canada	Victoriaville Tigres (QMJHL)	(Note: The Flyers traded their ninth-round pick, 287th overall, and their 2001 eighth-round pick to the Tampa Bay Lightning for the Lightning's seventh-round pick, 201st overall, on June 24, 2001.)

== Farm teams ==
The Flyers were affiliated with the Philadelphia Phantoms of the American Hockey League and the Trenton Titans of the ECHL. The Phantoms missed the Calder Cup playoffs for the first time in their seven year existence. Trenton made the Kelly Cup playoffs but were swept in the first round by the Atlantic City Boardwalk Bullies.
