= 2002–03 Vancouver Canucks season =

NHL hockey team season

2002–03 Vancouver Canucks
- Division: 2nd Northwest
- Conference: 4th Western
- 2002–03 record: 45–23–13–1
- Home record: 22–13–6–0
- Road record: 23–10–7–1
- Goals for: 264
- Goals against: 208

Team information
- General manager: Brian Burke
- Coach: Marc Crawford
- Captain: Markus Naslund
- Alternate captains: Murray Baron; Ed Jovanovski; Trent Klatt; Trevor Linden
- Arena: General Motors Place
- Average attendance: 18,396
- Minor league affiliates: Manitoba Moose (AHL); Columbia Inferno (ECHL)

Team leaders
- Goals: Markus Naslund (48)
- Assists: Markus Naslund (56)
- Points: Markus Naslund (104)
- Penalty minutes: Todd Bertuzzi (144)
- Plus/minus: Marek Malik (+23)
- Wins: Dan Cloutier (33)
- Goals against average: Alex Auld (1.57)

The 2002–03 Vancouver Canucks season was the Canucks' 33rd NHL season.

As of 2023, the only remaining active member of the 2002–03 Vancouver Canucks is Jan Hlaváč. He is a member of HC Stadion Vrchlabí of the 2nd Czech Republic Hockey League.

== Regular season ==
The Canucks had much success in the regular season as the West Coast Express Line (Brendan Morrison, Markus Naslund and Todd Bertuzzi) played their first full season intact and contributed 67% of the team's goals. The Canucks led all teams in power-play goals scored, with 87. They also set a franchise record with a ten game win streak in November 2002. As the season wound down, many expected the Canucks to win the Northwest Division title (due to the slow start by division rivals Colorado Avalanche). Despite the chances, the Canucks failed to clinch the Northwest division on the last day of the regular season with a 2-0 loss to the Los Angeles Kings coupled with a win by the Colorado Avalanche. Markus Naslund also lost the Maurice "Rocket" Richard Trophy on the last day of the regular season and missed out on tying fellow Swede Hakan Loob as the only Swedish players who have scored 50 goals in a season. Worse, Peter Forsberg also narrowly beat Naslund for the Art Ross Trophy. Naslund publicly came out to apologize to Canuck fans for "choking".

=== Final standings ===
Northwest Division
No.	CR		GP	W	L	T	OTL	GF	GA	Pts
1	3	**Colorado Avalanche**	82	42	19	13	8	251	194	105
2	4	**Vancouver Canucks**	82	45	23	13	1	264	208	104
3	6	**Minnesota Wild**	82	42	29	10	1	198	178	95
4	8	**Edmonton Oilers**	82	36	26	11	9	231	230	92
5	12	Calgary Flames	82	29	36	13	4	186	228	75

Note: CR = Conference rank; GP = Games played; W = Wins; L = Losses; T = Ties; OTL = Overtime loss; GF = Goals for; GA = Goals against; Pts = Points
Bolded teams qualified for the playoffs.

Western Conference
R		Div	GP	W	L	T	OTL	GF	GA	Pts
**1**	**Z-** Dallas Stars	**PA**	**82**	**46**	**17**	**15**	**4**	**245**	**169**	111
**2**	**Y-** Detroit Red Wings	**CE**	**82**	**48**	**20**	**10**	**4**	**269**	**203**	110
**3**	**Y-** Colorado Avalanche	**NW**	**82**	**42**	**19**	**13**	**8**	**251**	**194**	105
**4**	**X-** Vancouver Canucks	**NW**	**82**	**45**	**23**	**13**	**1**	**264**	**208**	104
**5**	**X-** St. Louis Blues	**CE**	**82**	**41**	**24**	**11**	**6**	**253**	**222**	99
**6**	**X-** Minnesota Wild	**NW**	**82**	**42**	**29**	**10**	**1**	**198**	**178**	95
**7**	**X-** Mighty Ducks of Anaheim	**PA**	**82**	**40**	**27**	**9**	**6**	**203**	**193**	95
**8**	**X-** Edmonton Oilers	**NW**	**82**	**36**	**26**	**11**	**9**	**231**	**230**	92
8.5
9	Chicago Blackhawks	CE	82	30	33	13	6	207	226	79
10	Los Angeles Kings	PA	82	33	37	6	6	203	221	78
11	Phoenix Coyotes	PA	82	31	35	11	5	204	230	78
12	Calgary Flames	NW	82	29	36	13	4	186	228	75
13	Nashville Predators	CE	82	27	35	13	7	183	206	74
14	San Jose Sharks	PA	82	28	37	9	8	214	239	73
15	Columbus Blue Jackets	CE	82	29	42	8	3	213	263	69

Divisions: PA – Pacific, CE – Central, NW – Northwest

Z – Clinched conference; Y – Clinched division; X – Clinched playoff spot

== Schedule and results ==
=== Regular season ===
2002–03 regular season
October: 3–4–4–0 (home: 1–4–2–0; road: 2–0–2–0)

Game	Date	Score	Opponent	Record	Recap
1	October 10, 2002	3–0	@ Calgary Flames (2002–03)	1–0–0–0	W
2	October 12, 2002	5–3	San Jose Sharks (2002–03)	2–0–0–0	W
3	October 14, 2002	2–3	Calgary Flames (2002–03)	2–1–0–0	L
4	October 16, 2002	3–6	Boston Bruins (2002–03)	2–2–0–0	L
5	October 18, 2002	2–2 OT	@ Mighty Ducks of Anaheim (2002–03)	2–2–1–0	T
6	October 19, 2002	2–2 OT	@ Los Angeles Kings (2002–03)	2–2–2–0	T
7	October 21, 2002	5–2	@ San Jose Sharks (2002–03)	3–2–2–0	W
8	October 24, 2002	2–2 OT	Mighty Ducks of Anaheim (2002–03)	3–2–3–0	T
9	October 26, 2002	1–4	Dallas Stars (2002–03)	3–3–3–0	L
10	October 29, 2002	1–1 OT	Buffalo Sabres (2002–03)	3–3–4–0	T
11	October 31, 2002	1–5	Colorado Avalanche (2002–03)	3–4–4–0	L

November: 12–1–0–0 (home: 5–0–0–0; road: 7–1–0–0)

Game	Date	Score	Opponent	Record	Recap
12	November 2, 2002	4–2	@ Minnesota Wild (2002–03)	4–4–4–0	W
13	November 4, 2002	4–2	@ Colorado Avalanche (2002–03)	5–4–4–0	W
14	November 6, 2002	0–4	@ Dallas Stars (2002–03)	5–5–4–0	L
15	November 9, 2002	5–2	@ Phoenix Coyotes (2002–03)	6–5–4–0	W
16	November 12, 2002	6–3	St. Louis Blues (2002–03)	7–5–4–0	W
17	November 14, 2002	3–2	Los Angeles Kings (2002–03)	8–5–4–0	W
18	November 16, 2002	3–1	New York Rangers (2002–03)	9–5–4–0	W
19	November 20, 2002	5–3	Chicago Blackhawks (2002–03)	10–5–4–0	W
20	November 22, 2002	4–1	Detroit Red Wings (2002–03)	11–5–4–0	W
21	November 25, 2002	2–1	@ Minnesota Wild (2002–03)	12–5–4–0	W
22	November 27, 2002	3–2	@ Carolina Hurricanes (2002–03)	13–5–4–0	W
23	November 29, 2002	5–3	@ Tampa Bay Lightning (2002–03)	14–5–4–0	W
24	November 30, 2002	5–2	@ Florida Panthers (2002–03)	15–5–4–0	W

December: 7–6–1–0 (home: 3–3–1–0; road: 4–3–0–0)

Game	Date	Score	Opponent	Record	Recap
25	December 3, 2002	1–2	@ New York Islanders (2002–03)	15–6–4–0	L
26	December 4, 2002	3–2 OT	@ New Jersey Devils (2002–03)	16–6–4–0	W
27	December 7, 2002	2–4	Minnesota Wild (2002–03)	16–7–4–0	L
28	December 9, 2002	1–2	Calgary Flames (2002–03)	16–8–4–0	L
29	December 11, 2002	3–1	Colorado Avalanche (2002–03)	17–8–4–0	W
30	December 14, 2002	6–3	@ Edmonton Oilers (2002–03)	18–8–4–0	W
31	December 15, 2002	3–3 OT	Calgary Flames (2002–03)	18–8–5–0	T
32	December 17, 2002	2–3	@ Chicago Blackhawks (2002–03)	18–9–5–0	L
33	December 19, 2002	3–1	@ Nashville Predators (2002–03)	19–9–5–0	W
34	December 21, 2002	4–3 OT	Edmonton Oilers (2002–03)	20–9–5–0	W
35	December 23, 2002	3–5	@ Colorado Avalanche (2002–03)	20–10–5–0	L
36	December 26, 2002	4–2	@ Edmonton Oilers (2002–03)	21–10–5–0	W
37	December 28, 2002	7–3	Mighty Ducks of Anaheim (2002–03)	22–10–5–0	W
38	December 31, 2002	3–5	Toronto Maple Leafs (2002–03)	22–11–5–0	L

January: 7–5–2–0 (home: 5–2–2–0; road: 2–3–0–0)

Game	Date	Score	Opponent	Record	Recap
39	January 2, 2003	3–2	Montreal Canadiens (2002–03)	23–11–5–0	W
40	January 4, 2003	3–2	Florida Panthers (2002–03)	24–11–5–0	W
41	January 8, 2003	6–4	Ottawa Senators (2002–03)	25–11–5–0	W
42	January 10, 2003	2–3	Columbus Blue Jackets (2002–03)	25–12–5–0	L
43	January 11, 2003	0–3	@ San Jose Sharks (2002–03)	25–13–5–0	L
44	January 14, 2003	4–3	Nashville Predators (2002–03)	26–13–5–0	W
45	January 16, 2003	2–5	@ Minnesota Wild (2002–03)	26–14–5–0	L
46	January 17, 2003	4–2	@ Chicago Blackhawks (2002–03)	27–14–5–0	W
47	January 19, 2003	4–1	@ Detroit Red Wings (2002–03)	28–14–5–0	W
48	January 21, 2003	2–3	@ Nashville Predators (2002–03)	28–15–5–0	L
49	January 24, 2003	2–5	Detroit Red Wings (2002–03)	28–16–5–0	L
50	January 26, 2003	1–0	Phoenix Coyotes (2002–03)	29–16–5–0	W
51	January 28, 2003	2–2 OT	Minnesota Wild (2002–03)	29–16–6–0	T
52	January 30, 2003	3–3 OT	Edmonton Oilers (2002–03)	29–16–7–0	T

February: 9–1–2–0 (home: 4–1–0–0; road: 5–0–2–0)

Game	Date	Score	Opponent	Record	Recap
53	February 4, 2003	3–2	@ Pittsburgh Penguins (2002–03)	30–16–7–0	W
54	February 5, 2003	4–4 OT	@ Columbus Blue Jackets (2002–03)	30–16–8–0	T
55	February 7, 2003	4–2	@ Buffalo Sabres (2002–03)	31–16–8–0	W
56	February 10, 2003	2–1	Chicago Blackhawks (2002–03)	32–16–8–0	W
57	February 13, 2003	2–1 OT	Colorado Avalanche (2002–03)	33–16–8–0	W
58	February 15, 2003	2–2 OT	@ Calgary Flames (2002–03)	33–16–9–0	T
59	February 18, 2003	4–3 OT	@ Detroit Red Wings (2002–03)	34–16–9–0	W
60	February 20, 2003	4–2	@ St. Louis Blues (2002–03)	35–16–9–0	W
61	February 22, 2003	3–2 OT	@ Edmonton Oilers (2002–03)	36–16–9–0	W
62	February 23, 2003	7–2	Columbus Blue Jackets (2002–03)	37–16–9–0	W
63	February 25, 2003	8–0	Atlanta Thrashers (2002–03)	38–16–9–0	W
64	February 27, 2003	2–3	San Jose Sharks (2002–03)	38–17–9–0	L

March: 7–5–3–1 (home: 4–2–1–0; road: 3–3–2–1)

Game	Date	Score	Opponent	Record	Recap
65	March 1, 2003	1–1 OT	@ Montreal Canadiens (2002–03)	38–17–10–0	T
66	March 3, 2003	6–4	@ Boston Bruins (2002–03)	39–17–10–0	W
67	March 4, 2003	0–3	@ Philadelphia Flyers (2002–03)	39–18–10–0	L
68	March 6, 2003	4–5 OT	@ Columbus Blue Jackets (2002–03)	39–18–10–1	OTL
69	March 8, 2003	3–3 OT	@ Toronto Maple Leafs (2002–03)	39–18–11–1	T
70	March 11, 2003	4–3	New York Islanders (2002–03)	40–18–11–1	W
71	March 13, 2003	4–4 OT	St. Louis Blues (2002–03)	40–18–12–1	T
72	March 15, 2003	0–1	Toronto Maple Leafs (2002–03)	40–19–12–1	L
73	March 17, 2003	4–2	@ Dallas Stars (2002–03)	41–19–12–1	W
74	March 18, 2003	4–6	@ St. Louis Blues (2002–03)	41–20–12–1	L
75	March 20, 2003	7–3	Nashville Predators (2002–03)	42–20–12–1	W
76	March 23, 2003	6–0	Washington Capitals (2002–03)	43–20–12–1	W
77	March 25, 2003	3–4	Dallas Stars (2002–03)	43–21–12–1	L
78	March 27, 2003	5–1	Phoenix Coyotes (2002–03)	44–21–12–1	W
79	March 29, 2003	5–1	@ Los Angeles Kings (2002–03)	45–21–12–1	W
80	March 30, 2003	1–3	@ Mighty Ducks of Anaheim (2002–03)	45–22–12–1	L

April: 0–1–1–0 (home: 0–1–0–0; road: 0–0–1–0)

Game	Date	Score	Opponent	Record	Recap
81	April 2, 2003	3–3 OT	@ Phoenix Coyotes (2002–03)	45–22–13–1	T
82	April 6, 2003	0–2	Los Angeles Kings (2002–03)	45–23–13–1	L

Legend: W Win (2 points) L Loss (0 points) T Tie (1 point) OTL Overtime loss (1 point)

=== Playoffs ===
2003 Stanley Cup playoffs
Western Conference Quarterfinals vs. (5) St. Louis Blues: Canucks won 4–3

Game	Date	Visitor	Score	Home	OT	Decision	Attendance	Series	Recap
1	April 10	St. Louis	6–0	Vancouver		Cloutier	18,514	Blues lead 1–0	L
2	April 12	St. Louis	1–2	Vancouver		Cloutier	18,514	Series tied 1–1	W
3	April 14	Vancouver	1–3	St. Louis		Cloutier	19,699	Blues lead 2–1	L
4	April 16	Vancouver	1–4	St. Louis		Cloutier	19,936	Blues lead 3–1	L
5	April 18	St. Louis	3–5	Vancouver		Cloutier	18,514	Blues lead 3–2	W
6	April 20	Vancouver	4–3	St. Louis		Cloutier	19,522	Series tied 3–3	W
7	April 22	St. Louis	1–4	Vancouver		Cloutier	18,514	Canucks win 4–3	W

Western Conference Semifinals vs. (6) Minnesota Wild: Wild won 4–3

Game	Date	Visitor	Score	Home	OT	Decision	Attendance	Series	Recap
1	April 25	Minnesota	3–4	Vancouver	OT	Cloutier	18,514	Canucks lead 1–0	W
2	April 27	Minnesota	3–2	Vancouver		Cloutier	18,514	Series tied 1–1	L
3	April 29	Vancouver	3–2	Minnesota		Cloutier	19,394	Canucks lead 2–1	W
4	May 2	Vancouver	3–2	Minnesota	OT	Cloutier	19,386	Canucks lead 3–1	W
5	May 5	Minnesota	7–2	Vancouver		Cloutier	18,514	Canucks lead 3–2	L
6	May 7	Vancouver	1–5	Minnesota		Cloutier	19,350	Series tied 3–3	L
7	May 8	Minnesota	4–2	Vancouver		Cloutier	18,514	Wild win 4–3	L

Legend: W Win L Loss

== Player statistics ==
=== Scoring ===
- Position abbreviations: C = Centre; D = Defence; G = Goaltender; LW = Left wing; RW = Right wing
- † = Joined team via a transaction (e.g., trade, waivers, signing) during the season. Stats reflect time with the Canucks only.
- ‡ = Left team via a transaction (e.g., trade, waivers, release) during the season. Stats reflect time with the Canucks only.

No.	Player	Pos	Regular season						Playoffs					
No.	Player	Pos	GP	G	A	Pts	+/-	PIM	GP	G	A	Pts	+/-	PIM
19	Markus Naslund	LW	82	48	56	104	6	52	14	5	9	14	−6	18
44	Todd Bertuzzi	RW	82	46	51	97	2	144	14	2	4	6	−3	60
7	Brendan Morrison	C	82	25	46	71	18	36	14	4	7	11	−4	18
55	Ed Jovanovski	D	67	6	40	46	19	113	14	7	1	8	−5	22
24	Matt Cooke	LW	82	15	27	42	21	82	14	2	1	3	3	12
16	Trevor Linden	C	71	19	22	41	−1	30	14	1	2	3	−4	10
33	Henrik Sedin	C	78	8	31	39	9	38	14	3	2	5	−2	8
3	Brent Sopel	D	81	7	30	37	−15	23	14	2	6	8	−2	4
22	Daniel Sedin	LW	79	14	17	31	8	34	14	1	5	6	−2	8
6	Sami Salo	D	79	9	21	30	9	10	12	1	3	4	−2	0
26	Trent Klatt	RW	82	16	13	29	10	8	14	2	4	6	1	2
2	Mattias Ohlund	D	59	2	27	29	1	42	13	3	4	7	1	12
10	Trevor Letowski	RW	78	11	14	25	8	36	6	0	1	1	−1	0
13	Artem Chubarov	C	62	7	13	20	4	6	14	0	2	2	−2	4
8	Marek Malik†	D	69	7	11	18	23	52	14	1	1	2	−7	10
25	Mats Lindgren†	C	54	5	9	14	−2	18	—	—	—	—	—	—
15	Todd Warriner‡	LW	30	4	6	10	0	22	—	—	—	—	—	—
5	Bryan Allen	D	48	5	3	8	8	73	1	0	0	0	−2	2
23	Murray Baron	D	78	2	4	6	13	62	14	0	4	4	0	10
14	Brandon Reid	C	7	2	3	5	4	0	9	0	1	1	0	0
37	Jarkko Ruutu	RW	36	2	2	4	−7	66	13	0	2	2	1	14
4	Nolan Baumgartner	D	8	1	2	3	4	4	2	0	0	0	0	0
39	Dan Cloutier	G	57	0	3	3		24	14	0	0	0		8
9	Harold Druken‡	C	3	1	1	2	−1	0	—	—	—	—	—	—
17	Jan Hlavac‡	LW	9	1	1	2	−1	6	—	—	—	—	—	—
18	Jason King	C	8	0	2	2	0	0	—	—	—	—	—	—
15	Pat Kavanagh	RW	3	1	0	1	2	2	—	—	—	—	—	—
81	Fedor Fedorov	LW	7	0	1	1	0	4	—	—	—	—	—	—
1	Peter Skudra	G	23	0	1	1		0	—	—	—	—	—	—
20	Darren Langdon†	LW	45	0	1	1	−2	143	—	—	—	—	—	—
27	Mikko Jokela†	D	1	0	0	0	0	0	—	—	—	—	—	—
21	Zenith Komarniski	LW	1	0	0	0	0	2	—	—	—	—	—	—
30	Tyler Moss	G	1	0	0	0		0	—	—	—	—	—	—
28	Bryan Helmer	D	2	0	0	0	0	0	—	—	—	—	—	—
32	Brad May†	LW	3	0	0	0	1	10	14	0	0	0	−5	15
35	Alex Auld	G	7	0	0	0		0	1	0	0	0		0

=== Goaltending ===
No.	Player	Regular season											Playoffs									
No.	Player	GP	GS	W	L	T	SA	GA	GAA	SV%	SO	TOI	GP	GS	W	L	SA	GA	GAA	SV%	SO	TOI
39	Dan Cloutier	57	57	33	16	7	1477	136	2.42	.908	2	3376	14	14	7	7	341	45	3.24	.868	0	833
1	Peter Skudra	23	20	9	5	6	522	54	2.72	.897	1	1192	—	—	—	—	—	—	—	—	—	—
35	Alex Auld	7	5	3	3	0	165	10	1.57	.939	1	382	1	0	0	0	5	1	3.00	.800	0	20
30	Tyler Moss	1	0	0	0	0	14	1	2.67	.929	0	22	—	—	—	—	—	—	—	—	—	—

== Awards and records ==
=== Awards ===
Type	Award/honour	Recipient	Ref
League (annual)	Lester B. Pearson Award	Markus Naslund	
League (annual)	NHL First All-Star Team	Todd Bertuzzi (Right wing)	
League (annual)	NHL First All-Star Team	Markus Naslund (Left wing)	
League (in-season)	NHL All-Star Game selection	Todd Bertuzzi	
League (in-season)	NHL All-Star Game selection	Marc Crawford (coach)	
League (in-season)	NHL All-Star Game selection	Ed Jovanovski	
League (in-season)	NHL All-Star Game selection	Markus Naslund	
League (in-season)	NHL Player of the Month	Dan Cloutier (November)	
League (in-season)	NHL Player of the Week	Dan Cloutier (February 17)	
League (in-season)	NHL Player of the Week	Brendan Morrison (February 24)	
League (in-season)	NHL Player of the Week	Todd Bertuzzi (March 24)	
Team	Babe Pratt Trophy	Ed Jovanovski	
Team	Cyclone Taylor Trophy	Markus Naslund	
Team	Cyrus H. McLean Trophy	Markus Naslund	
Team	Fred J. Hume Award	Matt Cooke	
Team	Molson Cup	Markus Naslund	
Team	Most Exciting Player Award	Todd Bertuzzi	

=== Milestones ===
Milestone	Player	Date	Ref
First game	Fedor Fedorov	October 10, 2002	
First game	Mikko Jokela	February 18, 2003	
First game	Brandon Reid	March 1, 2003	
First game	Jason King	March 17, 2003	

== Transactions ==
The Canucks were involved in the following transactions from June 14, 2002, the day after the deciding game of the 2002 Stanley Cup Finals, through June 9, 2003, the day of the deciding game of the 2003 Stanley Cup Finals.

=== Trades ===
Date	Details		Ref
June 23, 2002	To Vancouver Canucks: Jeff Farkas	To Toronto Maple Leafs: Josh Holden	
June 25, 2002	To Vancouver Canucks: Future considerations (Note: 8th-round pick in 2003)	To Toronto Maple Leafs: Ryan Bonni	
September 4, 2002	To Vancouver Canucks: Tomas Mojzis	To Toronto Maple Leafs: Brad Leeb	
September 21, 2002	To Vancouver Canucks: Sami Salo	To Ottawa Senators: Peter Schaefer	
November 1, 2002	To Vancouver Canucks: Darren Langdon; Marek Malik	To Carolina Hurricanes: Harold Druken; Jan Hlavac	
January 20, 2003	To Vancouver Canucks: Chris Herperger; Chris Nielsen	To Atlanta Thrashers: Jeff Farkas	
January 24, 2003	To Vancouver Canucks: Mikko Jokela	To New Jersey Devils: Steve Kariya	
February 5, 2003	To Vancouver Canucks: Future considerations	To Philadelphia Flyers: Todd Warriner	
March 11, 2003	To Vancouver Canucks: Brad May	To Phoenix Coyotes: 2nd or 3rd-round pick in 2003 (Note: Phoenix received the 3rd-rounder.)	

=== Players acquired ===
Date	Player	Former team	Term	Via	Ref
July 5, 2002	Tyler Moss	Carolina Hurricanes		Free agency	
July 10, 2002	Jaroslav Obsut	Colorado Avalanche		Free agency	
July 11, 2002	Nolan Baumgartner	Chicago Blackhawks		Free agency	
October 24, 2002	John Craighead	Revier Lions (DEL)		Free agency	
November 3, 2002	Mats Lindgren	Manitoba Moose (AHL)		Free agency	

=== Players lost ===
Date	Player	New team	Via (Note: In parentheses is the player's free agency group on July 1 if applicable.)	Ref
June 30, 2002	Alexei Tezikov		Retirement (UFA)	
July 4, 2002	Scott Lachance	Columbus Blue Jackets	Free agency (V)	
July 4, 2002	Andre Savage	Philadelphia Flyers	Free agency (VI)	
July 15, 2002	Jason Strudwick	Chicago Blackhawks	Free agency (UFA)	
August 15, 2002	Andrew Cassels	Columbus Blue Jackets	Free agency (III)	
October 11, 2002	Mike Brown	Anaheim Mighty Ducks	Waivers	
October 11, 2002	Alfie Michaud	Peoria Rivermen (ECHL)	Free agency (VI)	
October 21, 2002	Martin Brochu	Verdun Dragons (QSPHL)	Free agency (VI)	
May 31, 2003	Peter Skudra	Ak Bars Kazan (RSL)	Free agency	

=== Signings ===
Date	Player	Term	Contract type	Ref
June 14, 2002	Tim Smith		Entry-level	
June 27, 2002	Zenith Komarniski	1-year	Option exercised	
June 27, 2002	Trevor Letowski	1-year	Option exercised	
June 27, 2002	Peter Skudra	1-year	Option exercised	
July 31, 2002	Artem Chubarov	1-year	Re-signing	
July 31, 2002	Harold Druken	1-year	Re-signing	
August 3, 2002	Brendan Morrison	2-year	Arbitration award	
September 4, 2002	Steve Kariya		Re-signing	
September 9, 2002	Herberts Vasiļjevs		Re-signing	
September 12, 2002	Bryan Helmer	1-year	Re-signing	
September 12, 2002	Pat Kavanagh		Re-signing	
September 16, 2002	Jeff Farkas		Re-signing	
September 16, 2002	Ryan Ready		Re-signing	
October 3, 2002	Todd Warriner		Re-signing	
October 11, 2002	Jason King		Entry-level	
January 27, 2003	Ed Jovanovski	3-year	Extension	
January 27, 2003	Trevor Linden	3-year	Extension	

== Draft picks ==
Below are the Vancouver Canucks' selections at the 2002 NHL entry draft which was held on June 22–23, 2002 at the Air Canada Centre in Toronto.

Round	#	Player	Pos	Nationality	College/Junior/Club team (League)
2	49	Kirill Koltsov	D	Russia	Avangard Omsk (RSL)
2	55^{[a]}	Denis Grot	D	Russia	Elemach Elektrostal (Russia-2)
3	68^{[b]}	Brett Skinner	D	Canada	Des Moines Buccaneers (USHL)
3	83^{[c]}	Lukas Mensator	G	Czech Republic	HC Karlovy Vary U20 (Czech U20)
4	114	John Laliberte	LW	United States	New Hampshire Junior Monarchs (EJHL)
5	151	Rob McVicar	G	Canada	Brandon Wheat Kings (WHL)
7	214	Marc-Andre Roy	LW	Canada	Baie-Comeau Drakkar (QMJHL)
7	223^{[d]}	Ilya Krikunov	LW	Russia	Elemach Elektrostal (Russia-2)
8	247	Matt Violin	G	Canada	Lake Superior State Lakers (CCHA)
9	277	Thomas Nussli	C	Switzerland	EV Zug (NLA)
9	278^{[e]}	Matt Gens	RW	United States	St. Cloud State Huskies (WCHA)

Draft notes

- The Canucks' first-round pick was involved in the trade detailed in Note A.^{[a]}
- ^{a} The New York Islanders' second-round pick (previously acquired by the Washington Capitals) went to the Canucks as the result of a trade on November 10, 2001 that sent the Canucks' 2002 first-round pick and 2003 third-round pick to Washington in exchange for Trevor Linden and this pick.
- ^{b} The Tampa Bay Lightning's third-round pick (previously acquired by the Philadelphia Flyers) went to the Canucks as the result of a trade on December 17, 2001 that sent Donald Brashear and the Canucks' 2002 sixth-round pick to Philadelphia in exchange for Jan Hlavac and this pick.
- The Canucks' third-round pick went to the Florida Panthers as the result of a trade on May 31, 2001 that sent Alex Auld to Vancouver in exchange for the Canucks' 2001 second-round pick and this pick.
- ^{c} The Los Angeles Kings' third-round pick went to the Canucks as the result of a trade on February 15, 2001 that sent Felix Potvin to Los Angeles in exchange for this pick.
- The Canucks' sixth-round pick was involved in the trade detailed in Note B.^{[b]}
- ^{d} The Canucks received a seventh-round pick from the National Hockey League as compensation for Group III free agent Bob Essensa.
- ^{e} The Canucks received a ninth-round pick from the National Hockey League as compensation for Group III free agent Greg Hawgood.

== See also ==
- 2002–03 NHL season
