= 2002–03 Pittsburgh Penguins season =

NHL team season

2002–03 Pittsburgh Penguins
- Division: 5th Atlantic
- Conference: 14th Eastern
- 2002–03 record: 27–44–6–5
- Home record: 15–22–2–2
- Road record: 12–22–4–3
- Goals for: 189
- Goals against: 255

Team information
- General manager: Craig Patrick
- Coach: Rick Kehoe
- Captain: Mario Lemieux
- Alternate captains: Alexei Kovalev (Oct.–Feb.); Martin Straka
- Arena: Mellon Arena
- Average attendance: 14,750
- Minor league affiliates: Wilkes-Barre/Scranton Penguins; Wheeling Nailers

Team leaders
- Goals: Mario Lemieux (28)
- Assists: Mario Lemieux (63)
- Points: Mario Lemieux (91)
- Penalty minutes: Steve McKenna (128)
- Plus/minus: Guillaume Lefebvre; Mathias Johansson (+1)
- Wins: Johan Hedberg (14)
- Goals against average: Sebastien Caron (2.64)

The 2002–03 Pittsburgh Penguins season was the Penguins' 36th season. The team finished fifth and last in the Atlantic Division and did not qualify for the Stanley Cup playoffs for the second year in a row for the first time since the 1986–87 season and the 1987–88 season.

== Regular season ==
The Penguins were shut out an NHL-high ten times, tied with the Calgary Flames, Minnesota Wild and Nashville Predators.

=== Final standings ===
Atlantic Division
No.	CR		GP	W	L	T	OTL	GF	GA	Pts
1	2	**New Jersey Devils**	82	46	20	10	6	216	166	108
2	4	**Philadelphia Flyers**	82	45	20	13	4	211	166	107
3	8	**New York Islanders**	82	35	34	11	2	224	231	83
4	9	New York Rangers	82	32	36	10	4	210	231	78
5	14	Pittsburgh Penguins	82	27	44	6	5	189	255	65

Note: CR = Conference rank; GP = Games played; W = Wins; L = Losses; T = Ties; OTL = Overtime loss; GF = Goals for; GA = Goals against; Pts = Points
Bolded teams qualified for the playoffs.

Eastern Conference
R		Div	GP	W	L	T	OTL	GF	GA	Pts
**1**	**P-** Ottawa Senators	**NE**	**82**	**52**	**21**	**8**	**1**	**263**	**182**	113
**2**	**Y-** New Jersey Devils	**AT**	**82**	**46**	**20**	**10**	**6**	**216**	**166**	108
**3**	**Y-** Tampa Bay Lightning	**SE**	**82**	**36**	**25**	**16**	**5**	**219**	**210**	93
**4**	**X-** Philadelphia Flyers	**AT**	**82**	**45**	**20**	**13**	**4**	**211**	**166**	107
**5**	**X-** Toronto Maple Leafs	**NE**	**82**	**44**	**28**	**7**	**3**	**236**	**208**	98
**6**	**X-** Washington Capitals	**SE**	**82**	**39**	**29**	**8**	**6**	**224**	**220**	92
**7**	**X-** Boston Bruins	**NE**	**82**	**36**	**31**	**11**	**4**	**245**	**237**	87
**8**	**X-** New York Islanders	**AT**	**82**	**35**	**34**	**11**	**2**	**224**	**231**	83
8.5
9	New York Rangers	AT	82	32	36	10	4	210	231	78
10	Montreal Canadiens	NE	82	30	35	8	9	206	234	77
11	Atlanta Thrashers	SE	82	31	39	7	5	226	284	74
12	Buffalo Sabres	NE	82	27	37	10	8	190	219	72
13	Florida Panthers	SE	82	24	36	13	9	176	237	70
14	Pittsburgh Penguins	AT	82	27	44	6	5	189	255	65
15	Carolina Hurricanes	SE	82	22	43	11	6	171	240	61

Divisions: AT – Atlantic, NE – Northeast, SE – Southeast

P – Clinched Presidents Trophy; Y – Clinched division; X – Clinched playoff spot

== Schedule and results ==
2002–03 regular season
October: 6–2–2–0 (home: 4–1–1–0; road: 2–1–1–0), 14 points

#	Oct	Visitor	Score	Home	Location/Attendance	Record	Points	Recap
1	10	Toronto Maple Leafs	6–0	Pittsburgh Penguins	Civic Arena (15309)	0–1–0–0	0	L
2	12	New York Rangers	0–6	Pittsburgh Penguins	Civic Arena (14813)	1–1–0–0	2	W
3	14	Pittsburgh Penguins	5–4	Toronto Maple Leafs	Air Canada Centre (18843)	2–1–0–0	4	W
4	16	Atlanta Thrashers	2–3	Pittsburgh Penguins	Civic Arena (12161)	3–1–0–0	6	W
5	19	Tampa Bay Lightning	3–3	Pittsburgh Penguins	Civic Arena (16106)	3–1–1–0	7	T
6	22	Pittsburgh Penguins	3–3	Montreal Canadiens	Bell Centre (19895)	3–1–2–0	8	T
7	25	Pittsburgh Penguins	3–7	Detroit Red Wings	Joe Louis Arena (20058)	3–2–2–0	8	L
8	26	Buffalo Sabres	2–5	Pittsburgh Penguins	Civic Arena (16188)	4–2–2–0	10	W
9	28	Washington Capitals	2–3	Pittsburgh Penguins	Civic Arena (14303)	5–2–2–0	12	W
10	30	Pittsburgh Penguins	4–1	Ottawa Senators	Canadian Tire Centre (17987)	6–2–2–0	14	W

November: 5–4–1–3 (home: 3–2–0–1; road: 2–2–1–2), 14 points

#	Nov	Visitor	Score	Home	Location/Attendance	Record	Points	Recap
11	2	Tampa Bay Lightning	3–5	Pittsburgh Penguins	Civic Arena (17108)	7–2–2–0	16	W
12	6	Pittsburgh Penguins	3–4 OT	Florida Panthers	BB&T Center (14244)	7–2–2–1	17	OTL
13	8	Pittsburgh Penguins	1–4	Tampa Bay Lightning	Amalie Arena (18741)	7–3–2–1	17	L
14	9	Pittsburgh Penguins	2–3	Carolina Hurricanes	PNC Arena (18730)	7–4–2–1	17	L
15	14	Pittsburgh Penguins	1–1	Minnesota Wild	Xcel Energy Center (18568)	7–4–3–1	18	T
16	16	New York Islanders	3–2	Pittsburgh Penguins	Civic Arena (15723)	7–5–3–1	18	L
17	18	Pittsburgh Penguins	4–5 OT	Montreal Canadiens	Bell Centre (21273)	7–5–3–2	19	OTL
18	20	Montreal Canadiens	3–2 OT	Pittsburgh Penguins	Civic Arena (13549)	7–5–3–3	20	OTL
19	22	Pittsburgh Penguins	3–1	Atlanta Thrashers	Philips Arena (17375)	8–5–3–3	22	W
20	23	San Jose Sharks	1–4	Pittsburgh Penguins	Civic Arena (16958)	9–5–3–3	24	W
21	27	Philadelphia Flyers	2–7	Pittsburgh Penguins	Civic Arena (16385)	10–5–3–3	26	W
22	29	Pittsburgh Penguins	4–1	Buffalo Sabres	First Niagara Center (15733)	11–5–3–3	28	W
23	30	Boston Bruins	3–2	Pittsburgh Penguins	Civic Arena (15111)	11–6–3–3	28	L

December: 4–9–0–2 (home: 3–3–0–1; road: 1–6–0–1), 10 points

#	Dec	Visitor	Score	Home	Location/Attendance	Record	Points	Recap
24	3	Washington Capitals	4–1	Pittsburgh Penguins	Civic Arena (11640)	11–7–3–3	28	L
25	6	Pittsburgh Penguins	1–3	New Jersey Devils	Izod Center (16860)	11–8–3–3	28	L
26	7	New York Islanders	6–3	Pittsburgh Penguins	Civic Arena (13170)	11–9–3–3	28	L
27	10	Pittsburgh Penguins	2–4	Toronto Maple Leafs	Air Canada Centre (19388)	11–10–3–3	28	L
28	12	Pittsburgh Penguins	2–5	San Jose Sharks	SAP Center at San Jose (17496)	11–11–3–3	28	L
29	14	Pittsburgh Penguins	2–3 OT	Los Angeles Kings	Staples Center (18184)	11–11–3–4	29	OTL
30	15	Pittsburgh Penguins	0–5	Mighty Ducks of Anaheim	Honda Center (16542)	11–12–3–4	29	L
31	17	Pittsburgh Penguins	2–5	Phoenix Coyotes	America West Arena (13174)	11–13–3–4	29	L
32	19	New Jersey Devils	3–1	Pittsburgh Penguins	Civic Arena (14220)	11–14–3–4	29	L
33	21	Calgary Flames	0–2	Pittsburgh Penguins	Civic Arena (12571)	12–14–3–4	31	W
34	23	Buffalo Sabres	2–5	Pittsburgh Penguins	Civic Arena (16569)	13–14–3–4	33	W
35	26	Pittsburgh Penguins	6–1	New York Rangers	Madison Square Garden (IV) (18200)	14–14–3–4	35	W
36	28	Montreal Canadiens	2–3	Pittsburgh Penguins	Civic Arena (16109)	15–14–3–4	37	W
37	30	Atlanta Thrashers	3–2 OT	Pittsburgh Penguins	Civic Arena (16989)	15–14–3–5	38	OTL
38	31	Pittsburgh Penguins	2–5	Columbus Blue Jackets	Nationwide Arena (18136)	15–15–3–5	38	L

January: 6–7–1–0 (home: 2–3–0–0; road: 4–4–1–0), 13 points

#	Jan	Visitor	Score	Home	Location/Attendance	Record	Points	Recap
39	3	Pittsburgh Penguins	4–1	Atlanta Thrashers	Philips Arena (14177)	16–15–3–5	40	W
40	4	New York Islanders	2–3 OT	Pittsburgh Penguins	Civic Arena (14331)	17–15–3–5	42	W
41	7	Pittsburgh Penguins	3–6	New York Islanders	Nassau Coliseum (14857)	17–16–3–5	42	L
42	9	Toronto Maple Leafs	4–2	Pittsburgh Penguins	Civic Arena (13889)	17–17–3–5	42	L
43	11	New York Rangers	3–1	Pittsburgh Penguins	Civic Arena (14769)	17–18–3–5	42	L
44	13	Pittsburgh Penguins	2–1	Boston Bruins	TD Garden (15672)	18–18–3–5	44	W
45	15	Pittsburgh Penguins	2–0	Carolina Hurricanes	PNC Arena (15265)	19–18–3–5	46	W
46	17	Pittsburgh Penguins	3–2	Tampa Bay Lightning	Amalie Arena (18202)	20–18–3–5	48	W
47	18	Pittsburgh Penguins	0–3	Florida Panthers	BB&T Center (18313)	20–19–3–5	48	L
48	21	Pittsburgh Penguins	0–0	Buffalo Sabres	First Niagara Center (13858)	20–19–4–5	49	T
49	23	Boston Bruins	4–1	Pittsburgh Penguins	Civic Arena (13271)	20–20–4–5	49	L
50	25	Chicago Blackhawks	3–5	Pittsburgh Penguins	Civic Arena (16958)	21–20–4–5	51	W
51	28	Pittsburgh Penguins	2–5	New York Islanders	Nassau Coliseum (14246)	21–21–4–5	51	L
52	30	Pittsburgh Penguins	1–2	Washington Capitals	Verizon Center (18277)	21–22–4–5	51	L

February: 4–8–0–0 (home: 2–6–0–0; road: 2–2–0–0), 8 points

#	Feb	Visitor	Score	Home	Location/Attendance	Record	Points	Recap
53	4	Vancouver Canucks	3–2	Pittsburgh Penguins	Civic Arena (13202)	21–23–4–5	51	L
54	6	Florida Panthers	6–0	Pittsburgh Penguins	Civic Arena (12231)	21–24–4–5	51	L
55	8	Pittsburgh Penguins	5–2	Boston Bruins	TD Garden (17565)	22–24–4–5	53	W
56	12	Ottawa Senators	3–0	Pittsburgh Penguins	Civic Arena (14197)	22–25–4–5	53	L
57	14	Pittsburgh Penguins	0–1	New York Rangers	Madison Square Garden (IV) (18200)	22–26–4–5	53	L
58	15	Pittsburgh Penguins	4–1	New Jersey Devils	Izod Center (18235)	23–26–4–5	55	W
59	18	Edmonton Oilers	3–4 OT	Pittsburgh Penguins	Civic Arena (13552)	24–26–4–5	57	W
60	20	Colorado Avalanche	5–2	Pittsburgh Penguins	Civic Arena (13751)	24–27–4–5	57	L
61	22	St. Louis Blues	1–2 OT	Pittsburgh Penguins	Civic Arena (14718)	25–27–4–5	59	W
62	23	New Jersey Devils	4–3	Pittsburgh Penguins	Civic Arena (17148)	25–28–4–5	59	L
63	25	Los Angeles Kings	5–3	Pittsburgh Penguins	Civic Arena (11736)	25–29–4–5	59	L
64	27	Pittsburgh Penguins	0–6	Nashville Predators	Bridgestone Arena (13581)	25–30–4–5	59	L

March: 1–13–2–0 (home: 0–7–1–0; road: 1–6–1–0), 4 points

#	Mar	Visitor	Score	Home	Location/Attendance	Record	Points	Recap
65	1	Pittsburgh Penguins	1–4	Colorado Avalanche	Pepsi Center (18007)	25–31–4–5	59	L
66	2	Pittsburgh Penguins	1–3	Dallas Stars	American Airlines Center (18532)	25–32–4–5	59	L
67	4	Phoenix Coyotes	4–1	Pittsburgh Penguins	Civic Arena (13686)	25–33–4–5	59	L
68	6	Carolina Hurricanes	4–0	Pittsburgh Penguins	Civic Arena (14812)	25–34–4–5	59	L
69	8	Ottawa Senators	5–1	Pittsburgh Penguins	Civic Arena (14354)	25–35–4–5	59	L
70	9	Pittsburgh Penguins	2–4	Ottawa Senators	Canadian Tire Centre (18500)	25–36–4–5	59	L
71	12	Nashville Predators	2–2	Pittsburgh Penguins	Civic Arena (17148)	25–36–5–5	60	T
72	15	Philadelphia Flyers	4–1	Pittsburgh Penguins	Civic Arena (17032)	25–37–5–5	60	L
73	16	Florida Panthers	4–2	Pittsburgh Penguins	Civic Arena (16958)	25–38–5–5	60	L
74	18	Detroit Red Wings	5–1	Pittsburgh Penguins	Civic Arena (13840)	25–39–5–5	60	L
75	20	Pittsburgh Penguins	2–4	Philadelphia Flyers	Wells Fargo Center (19487)	25–40–5–5	60	L
76	21	Pittsburgh Penguins	1–3	New Jersey Devils	Izod Center (15401)	25–41–5–5	60	L
77	23	Pittsburgh Penguins	1–1	Chicago Blackhawks	United Center (16234)	25–41–6–5	61	T
78	26	Pittsburgh Penguins	3–1	New York Rangers	Madison Square Garden (IV) (18200)	26–41–6–5	63	W
79	29	Pittsburgh Penguins	0–3	Philadelphia Flyers	Wells Fargo Center (19654)	26–42–6–5	63	L
80	31	Philadelphia Flyers	6–1	Pittsburgh Penguins	Civic Arena (12505)	26–43–6–5	63	L

April: 1–1–0–0 (home: 1–0–0–0; road: 0–1–0–0), 2 points

#	Apr	Visitor	Score	Home	Location/Attendance	Record	Points	Recap
81	2	Carolina Hurricanes	2–3	Pittsburgh Penguins	Civic Arena (15718)	27–43–6–5	65	W
82	5	Pittsburgh Penguins	3–5	Washington Capitals	Verizon Center (18277)	27–44–6–5	65	L

Legend: W Win (2 points) L Loss (0 points) T Tie (1 point) OTL Overtime loss (1 point)

== Player statistics ==
Skaters

Regular season
Player	GP	G	A	Pts	+/−	PIM
Mario Lemieux	67	28	63	91	-25	43
Alex Kovalev^{‡}	54	27	37	64	-11	50
Martin Straka	60	18	28	46	-18	12
Dick Tarnstrom	61	7	34	41	-11	50
Jan Hrdina^{‡}	57	14	25	39	1	34
Aleksey Morozov	27	9	16	25	-3	16
Ville Nieminen	75	9	12	21	-25	93
Randy Robitaille^{‡}	41	5	12	17	5	8
Wayne Primeau^{‡}	70	5	11	16	-30	55
Rico Fata^{†}	27	5	8	13	-6	10
Milan Kraft	31	7	5	12	-8	10
Tomas Surovy	26	4	7	11	0	10
Steve McKenna	79	9	1	10	-18	128
Michal Rozsival	53	4	6	10	-5	40
Shean Donovan^{‡}	52	4	5	9	-6	30
Alexandre Daigle	33	4	3	7	-10	8
Marc Bergevin^{‡}	69	2	5	7	-9	36
Kent Manderville	82	2	5	7	-22	46
Janne Laukkanen^{‡}	17	1	6	7	-3	8
Ian Moran^{‡}	70	0	7	7	-17	46
Eric Meloche	13	5	1	6	-2	4
Michal Sivek	38	3	3	6	-5	14
Guillaume Lefebvre^{†}	12	2	4	6	1	0
Mathias Johansson^{†}	12	1	5	6	1	4
Richard Lintner^{†}	19	3	2	5	-9	10
Hans Jonsson	63	1	4	5	-23	36
Jamie Pushor	76	3	1	4	-28	76
Dan Lacouture^{‡}	44	2	2	4	-8	72
Andrew Ference^{‡}	22	1	3	4	-16	36
Brian Holzinger^{†}	9	1	2	3	-6	6
Dan Focht^{†}	12	0	3	3	-7	19
Mikael Samuelsson^{†}	22	2	0	2	-21	8
Shawn Heins^{†}	27	1	1	2	-2	33
Vladimir Vujtek	5	0	1	1	-4	0
Joel Bouchard^{†}	7	0	1	1	-6	0
Tom Kostopoulos	8	0	1	1	-4	0
Kris Beech	12	0	1	1	-3	6
Josef Melichar	8	0	0	0	-2	2
Ramzi Abid	3	0	0	0	-5	2
Konstantin Koltsov	2	0	0	0	-2	0
Ross Lupaschuk	3	0	0	0	-3	4
Brooks Orpik	6	0	0	0	-5	2
Total		189	331	520	—	1,067

Goaltenders

Regular season
Player	GP	GS	TOI	W	L	T	GA	GAA	SA	SV%	SO	G	A	PIM
Johan Hedberg	41	39	2410:11	14	22	4	126	3.14	1197	0.895	1	0	2	18
Sebastien Caron	24	23	1408:07	7	14	2	62	2.64	741	0.916	2	0	0	6
Jean-Sebastien Aubin	21	20	1132:16	6	13	0	59	3.13	589	0.900	1	0	1	2
Total		82	4950:34	27	49	6	247	2.99	2527	0.902	4	0	3	26

^{†}Denotes player spent time with another team before joining the Penguins. Stats reflect time with the Penguins only.
^{‡}Denotes player was traded mid-season. Stats reflect time with the Penguins only.

== Awards and records ==
- Mario Lemieux became the first person to score 1000 assists for the Penguins. He did so in a 5–2 win over Boston on February 8.

=== Awards ===
Type	Award/honor	Recipient	Ref
League (annual)	NHL All-Rookie Team	Sebastien Caron (Goaltender)	
League (in-season)	NHL All-Star Game selection	Alexei Kovalev (Note: Kovalev and Lemieux were voted to the starting lineup. Lemieux did not play and was replaced by Vincent Lecavalier of the Tampa Bay Lightning.)	
League (in-season)	NHL All-Star Game selection	Mario Lemieux	
League (in-season)	NHL Player of the Month	Mario Lemieux (October)	
League (in-season)	NHL Player of the Week	Mario Lemieux (October 21)	
Team	A. T. Caggiano Memorial Booster Club Award	Mario Lemieux	
Team	Aldege "Baz" Bastien Memorial Good Guy Award	Steve McKenna	
Team	Leading Scorer Award	Mario Lemieux	
Team	Michel Briere Memorial Rookie of the Year Trophy	No winner	
Team	Most Valuable Player Award	Mario Lemieux	
Team	Players' Player Award	No winner	
Team	The Edward J. DeBartolo Community Service Award	Johan Hedberg	
Team	The Edward J. DeBartolo Community Service Award	Steve McKenna	

=== Milestones ===
Milestone	Player	Date	Ref
First game	Michal Sivek	November 29, 2002	
First game	Ross Lupaschuk	December 10, 2002	
First game	Brooks Orpik	December 10, 2002	
First game	Sebastien Caron	January 11, 2003	
First game	Konstantin Koltsov	January 28, 2003	
First game	Tomas Surovy	February 14, 2003	

== Transactions ==
The Penguins were involved in the following transactions from June 14, 2002, the day after the deciding game of the 2002 Stanley Cup Finals, through June 9, 2003, the day of the deciding game of the 2003 Stanley Cup Finals.

=== Trades ===
Date	Details		Ref
June 23, 2002	To New York Rangers: Krzysztof Oliwa	To Pittsburgh Penguins: Future considerations (Note: 9th-round pick in 2003.)	
February 9, 2003	To San Jose Sharks: Conditional 5th-round pick in 2003	To Pittsburgh Penguins: Shawn Heins	
February 10, 2003	To Calgary Flames: Andrew Ference	To Pittsburgh Penguins: Conditional 3rd-round pick in 2004	
February 10, 2003	To New York Rangers: Alexei Kovalev; Dan LaCouture; Janne Laukkanen; Mike Wilson	To Pittsburgh Penguins: Joel Bouchard; Rico Fata; Richard Lintner; Mikael Samuelsson; Cash ($3.9 million)	
March 9, 2003	To New York Islanders: Randy Robitaille	To Pittsburgh Penguins: 5th-round pick in 2003	
March 11, 2003	To San Jose Sharks: Wayne Primeau	To Pittsburgh Penguins: Matt Bradley	
March 11, 2003	To Phoenix Coyotes: Jan Hrdina; Francois Leroux	To Pittsburgh Penguins: Ramzi Abid; Dan Focht; Guillaume Lefebvre	
March 11, 2003	To Boston Bruins: Ian Moran	To Pittsburgh Penguins: 4th-round pick in 2003	
March 11, 2003	To Tampa Bay Lightning: Marc Bergevin	To Pittsburgh Penguins: Brian Holzinger	
March 11, 2003	To Calgary Flames: Shean Donovan	To Pittsburgh Penguins: Micki DuPont; Mattias Johansson	
May 12, 2003	To Tampa Bay Lightning: 9th-round pick in 2003	To Pittsburgh Penguins: Marc Bergevin	

=== Players acquired ===
Date	Player	Former team	Term	Via	Ref
June 26, 2002	Brendan Buckley	Wilkes-Barre/Scranton Penguins (AHL)		Free agency	
July 12, 2002	Steve McKenna	New York Rangers		Free agency	
July 15, 2002	Vladimir Vujtek	HPK (Liiga)		Free agency	
July 16, 2002	Francois Leroux	Berlin Capitals (DEL)		Free agency	
July 18, 2002	Marc Bergevin	St. Louis Blues		Free agency	
August 6, 2002	Dick Tarnstrom	New York Islanders		Waivers	
October 4, 2002	Alexandre Daigle	New York Rangers	1-year	Free agency	

=== Players lost ===
Date	Player	New team	Via (Note: In parentheses is the player's free agency group on July 1 if applicable.)	Ref
July 1, 2002	Robert Lang	Washington Capitals	Free agency (III)	
July 9, 2002	Martin Sonnenberg	Calgary Flames	Free agency (UFA)	
July 9, 2002	Darcy Verot	Calgary Flames	Free agency (UFA)	
July 11, 2002	Jeff Toms	Florida Panthers	Free agency (UFA)	
July 17, 2002	Robert Dome	Calgary Flames	Free agency (UFA)	
August 7, 2002	Peter Ratchuk	Buffalo Sabres	Free agency (UFA)	
August 8, 2002	Bert Robertsson	Ilves (Liiga)	Free agency (UFA)	
August 15, 2002	Dylan Gyori	Roanoke Express (ECHL)	Free agency (UFA)	
September 5, 2002	John Jakopin	San Jose Sharks	Free agency (UFA)	
September 27, 2002	Kevin Stevens		Retirement (III)	
October 4, 2002	Rick Berry	Washington Capitals	Waiver draft	
October 31, 2002	Alexandre Mathieu	Lexington Men O' War (ECHL)	Free agency (UFA)	

=== Signings ===
Date	Player	Term	Contract type	Ref
June 25, 2002	Jean-Sebastien Aubin		Re-signing	
June 26, 2002	Mario Lemieux	1-year	Re-signing	
July 15, 2002	Konstantin Koltsov		Entry-level	
July 30, 2002	Rick Berry		Re-signing	
July 30, 2002	Ville Nieminen		Re-signing	
July 30, 2002	Jamie Pushor		Re-signing	
July 31, 2002	Andrew Ference		Re-signing	
August 1, 2002	Shean Donovan	1-year	Re-signing	
August 1, 2002	Randy Robitaille		Re-signing	
August 2, 2002	Dan LaCouture		Re-signing	
August 3, 2002	Matt Murley		Entry-level	
August 7, 2002	Alexei Morozov		Re-signing	
September 3, 2002	Colby Armstrong		Entry-level	
September 3, 2002	Rob Tallas		Re-signing	
September 9, 2002	Tom Kostopoulos		Re-signing	
September 9, 2002	Josef Melichar		Re-signing	
September 11, 2002	Michal Rozsival		Re-signing	
September 27, 2002	Matt Hussey		Entry-level	
May 30, 2003	Drew Fata		Entry-level	
May 30, 2003	Alexandre Rouleau		Entry-level	

=== Other ===
Name	Date	Notes
Herb Brooks	August 16, 2002	Hired as director of player development
Rick Kehoe	April 15, 2003	Fired as head coach

== Draft picks ==
Pittsburgh Penguins' picks at the 2002 NHL entry draft.

Round	#	Player	Pos	Nationality	College/Junior/Club team (League)
1	5	Ryan Whitney	Defense	United States	Boston University (Hockey East)
2	35	Ondrej Nemec	Defense	Czech Republic	HC Vsetín (Czech Republic)
3	69	Erik Christensen	Center	Canada	Kamloops Blazers (WHL)
4	101	Daniel Fernholm	Defense	Sweden	Djurgårdens IF (Sweden)
5	136^{[a]}	Andy Sertich	Left wing	United States	Greenway High School (USHS-MN)
5	137^{[b]}	Cam Paddock	Center	Canada	Kelowna Rockets (WHL)
6	171	Robert Goepfert	Goaltender	United States	Cedar Rapids RoughRiders (USHL)
7	202	Patrik Bartschi	Forward	Switzerland	Kloten Flyers (Switzerland)
8	234	Maxime Talbot	Center	Canada	Hull Olympiques (QMJHL)
8	239^{[c]}	Ryan Lannon	Defense	United States	Harvard University (ECAC)
9	265	Dwight LaBrosse	Goaltender	United States	Guelph Storm (OHL)

Draft notes

- ^{a} Compensatory pick received for loss of Group III free agent Garth Snow.
- ^{b} Compensatory pick received from NHL as compensation for Group III free agent Garth Snow per Michel Leduc.
- ^{c} Compensatory pick received from NHL as compensation for Group III free agent Marc Bergevin.

== See also ==
- 2002–03 NHL season
