= 2002–03 Ottawa Senators season =

NHL hockey team season

2002–03 Ottawa Senators
- Presidents' Trophy winners
- Northeast Division champions
- Division: 1st Northeast
- Conference: 1st Eastern
- 2002–03 record: 52–21–8–1
- Home record: 28–9–3–1
- Road record: 24–12–5–0
- Goals for: 263
- Goals against: 182

Team information
- General manager: John Muckler
- Coach: Jacques Martin
- Captain: Daniel Alfredsson
- Alternate captains: Zdeno Chara; Curtis Leschyshyn; Wade Redden
- Arena: Corel Centre
- Average attendance: 17,198
- Minor league affiliate: Binghamton Senators

Team leaders
- Goals: Marian Hossa (45)
- Assists: Daniel Alfredsson (51)
- Points: Marian Hossa (80)
- Penalty minutes: Chris Neil (147)
- Plus/minus: Zdeno Chara (+29)
- Wins: Patrick Lalime (39)
- Goals against average: Patrick Lalime (2.16)

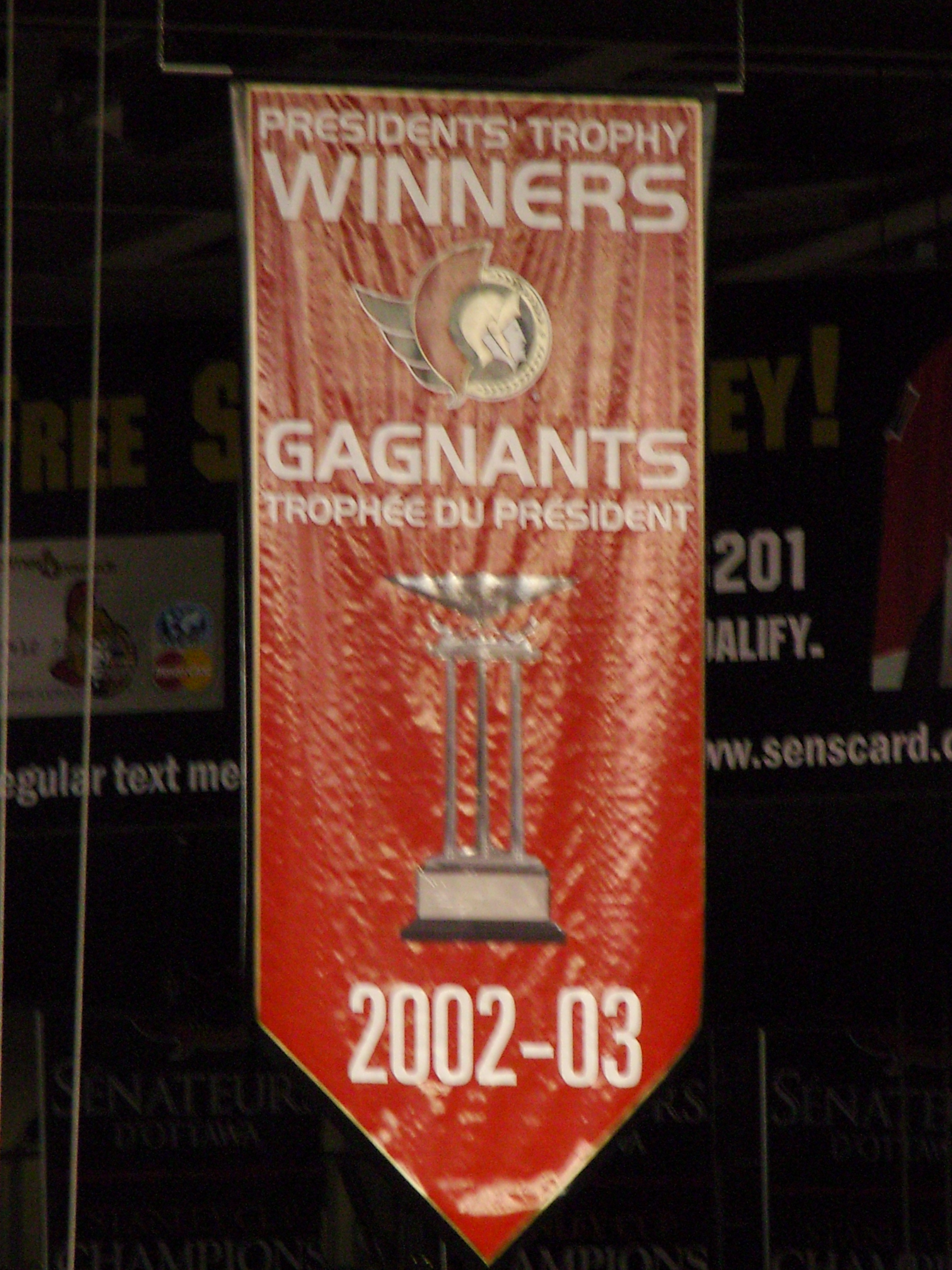
Banner at Canadian Tire Centre

The 2002–03 Ottawa Senators season was the 11th season of the Ottawa Senators of the National Hockey League (NHL). This season saw the Senators reach the highest point in the playoffs until the 2006–07 season. They were eliminated in the Eastern Conference final by the New Jersey Devils, the eventual Stanley Cup winning team. On top of their larger success, with their total 113 points they won the Presidents' Trophy, the Northeast Division title and the Eastern Conference title.

After their long history of debt problems, the Senators filed for bankruptcy on January 9, 2003. They continued regular season play after receiving emergency financing from the NHL. Despite the off-ice problems, they had a successful year, compared to their early day woes. The Presidents' Trophy awarded to the Senators made them the first Canadian team to win it since the Calgary Flames in their championship season of 1989, and the first Eastern Conference team to win it since the New York Rangers' title in the 1994 Stanley Cup Final. In the playoffs, they defeated their former teammate Alexei Yashin and his New York Islanders, then beat the Philadelphia Flyers in the second round, before coming within one game of making it into the Finals, falling to the New Jersey Devils.

== Offseason ==
General manager Marshall Johnston resigned and was replaced by John Muckler on July 1, 2002. Muckler had been a candidate for the positions of Ottawa head coach or GM back in 1992, but had chosen to sign on with the Buffalo Sabres instead.

== Regular season ==
Right winger Marian Hossa led Ottawa in scoring, just eclipsing Yashin's previous record of 44 goals. Without the goaltending issues that had plagued Senators teams of the past, Patrick Lalime showed one of his best seasons, with career bests in goals against average (GAA) and wins.

After a slow start to the season after an even .500 ratio, the Senators turned around their game with a ten-game unbeaten streak. Fans were concerned whether their start was due to off-ice problems. These worries, however, were soon irrelevant to fans when the Senators again clinched a playoff berth. Before the playoffs, the Senators addressed toughness concerns through separate trades to the Buffalo Sabres for grinders Vaclav Varada and Rob Ray respectively, plus two-way forward Bryan Smolinski from the Los Angeles Kings.

=== Division standings ===
Northeast Division
No.	CR		GP	W	L	T	OTL	GF	GA	Pts
1	1	**Ottawa Senators**	82	52	21	8	1	263	182	113
2	5	**Toronto Maple Leafs**	82	44	28	7	3	236	208	98
3	7	**Boston Bruins**	82	36	31	11	4	245	237	87
4	10	Montreal Canadiens	82	30	35	8	9	206	234	77
5	12	Buffalo Sabres	82	27	37	10	8	190	219	72

Note: CR = Conference rank; GP = Games played; W = Wins; L = Losses; T = Ties; OTL = Overtime loss; GF = Goals for; GA = Goals against; Pts = Points
Bolded teams qualified for the playoffs.

Eastern Conference
R		Div	GP	W	L	T	OTL	GF	GA	Pts
**1**	**P-** Ottawa Senators	**NE**	**82**	**52**	**21**	**8**	**1**	**263**	**182**	113
**2**	**Y-** New Jersey Devils	**AT**	**82**	**46**	**20**	**10**	**6**	**216**	**166**	108
**3**	**Y-** Tampa Bay Lightning	**SE**	**82**	**36**	**25**	**16**	**5**	**219**	**210**	93
**4**	**X-** Philadelphia Flyers	**AT**	**82**	**45**	**20**	**13**	**4**	**211**	**166**	107
**5**	**X-** Toronto Maple Leafs	**NE**	**82**	**44**	**28**	**7**	**3**	**236**	**208**	98
**6**	**X-** Washington Capitals	**SE**	**82**	**39**	**29**	**8**	**6**	**224**	**220**	92
**7**	**X-** Boston Bruins	**NE**	**82**	**36**	**31**	**11**	**4**	**245**	**237**	87
**8**	**X-** New York Islanders	**AT**	**82**	**35**	**34**	**11**	**2**	**224**	**231**	83
8.5
9	New York Rangers	AT	82	32	36	10	4	210	231	78
10	Montreal Canadiens	NE	82	30	35	8	9	206	234	77
11	Atlanta Thrashers	SE	82	31	39	7	5	226	284	74
12	Buffalo Sabres	NE	82	27	37	10	8	190	219	72
13	Florida Panthers	SE	82	24	36	13	9	176	237	70
14	Pittsburgh Penguins	AT	82	27	44	6	5	189	255	65
15	Carolina Hurricanes	SE	82	22	43	11	6	171	240	61

Divisions: AT – Atlantic, NE – Northeast, SE – Southeast

P – Clinched Presidents Trophy; Y – Clinched division; X – Clinched playoff spot

== Playoffs ==
In the first round of the playoffs, the team played the New York Islanders, facing former team captain Alexei Yashin for the first time in the playoffs. Yashin played well in the first game and the Islanders won the first game at the Corel Centre 3–0. The loss by the Senators was attributed to paying too much attention to stopping Yashin and not enough on the rest of the Islanders. The Senators adjusted their play for the next game winning it and the next three games in a row to win the series 4–1.

In the second round, the team faced the Philadelphia Flyers who had defeated the Toronto Maple Leafs in the first round. The Senators won the series on the basis of their strong defence, holding the Flyers to only ten goals in the six games, advancing to the Eastern Conference final series against the New Jersey Devils to decide the Prince of Wales Trophy.

The first two games of the series were in Ottawa and the wins were split between the Senators and Devils. In New Jersey, the Devils won both games to put the Senators at the brink of elimination. However, the Senators came back, winning the fifth game at home and the sixth game in New Jersey to force a seventh and deciding game at home.

In the seventh game, Ottawa got out to a 1-0 lead on a goal by Magnus Arvedson. The Devils would score the next two on goals in the second period by Jamie Langenbrunner. Going into the third down 2-1 the Sens tied it on a goal by Radek Bonk and dominated play in the third, when with two minutes remaining, Devils' forward Jeff Friesen deked out Patrick Lalime and shot over his leg pad, into the net, to score the series-winning goal.

== Schedule and results ==
=== Regular season ===
2002–03 regular season
October: 3–4–1–0 (home: 2–2–0–0; road: 1–2–1–0)

Game	Date	Score	Opponent	Record	Attendance	Recap
1	October 10, 2002	1–2	New Jersey Devils (2002–03)	0–1–0–0	16,865	L
2	October 12, 2002	2–1	@ Toronto Maple Leafs (2002–03)	1–1–0–0	19,198	W
3	October 15, 2002	2–1	Phoenix Coyotes (2002–03)	2–1–0–0	13,816	W
4	October 23, 2002	4–1	Carolina Hurricanes (2002–03)	3–1–0–0	14,847	W
5	October 24, 2002	2–2 OT	@ Boston Bruins (2002–03)	3–1–1–0	17,565	T
6	October 26, 2002	3–5	@ Montreal Canadiens (2002–03)	3–2–1–0	20,812	L
7	October 29, 2002	1–2	@ Philadelphia Flyers (2002–03)	3–3–1–0	19,077	L
8	October 30, 2002	1–4	Pittsburgh Penguins (2002–03)	3–4–1–0	17,987	L

November: 10–2–2–0 (home: 7–1–0–0; road: 3–1–2–0)

Game	Date	Score	Opponent	Record	Attendance	Recap
9	November 2, 2002	5–2	Detroit Red Wings (2002–03)	4–4–1–0	18,210	W
10	November 6, 2002	5–2	@ Colorado Avalanche (2002–03)	5–4–1–0	18,007	W
11	November 8, 2002	2–3	Los Angeles Kings (2002–03)	5–5–1–0	16,926	L
12	November 9, 2002	1–7	@ Boston Bruins (2002–03)	5–6–1–0	13,954	L
13	November 12, 2002	5–3	@ New York Islanders (2002–03)	6–6–1–0	12,659	W
14	November 14, 2002	3–2 OT	Florida Panthers (2002–03)	7–6–1–0	13,323	W
15	November 16, 2002	4–1	Buffalo Sabres (2002–03)	8–6–1–0	15,298	W
16	November 19, 2002	4–4 OT	@ Carolina Hurricanes (2002–03)	8–6–2–0	11,044	T
17	November 21, 2002	3–2	Montreal Canadiens (2002–03)	9–6–2–0	16,010	W
18	November 23, 2002	5–2	Columbus Blue Jackets (2002–03)	10–6–2–0	15,684	W
19	November 25, 2002	2–0	Toronto Maple Leafs (2002–03)	11–6–2–0	18,035	W
20	November 27, 2002	2–2 OT	@ New York Islanders (2002–03)	11–6–3–0	14,887	T
21	November 29, 2002	6–2	@ Washington Capitals (2002–03)	12–6–3–0	15,822	W
22	November 30, 2002	4–2	New York Islanders (2002–03)	13–6–3–0	15,121	W

December: 10–3–2–0 (home: 4–1–1–0; road: 6–2–1–0)

Game	Date	Score	Opponent	Record	Attendance	Recap
23	December 4, 2002	0–1	@ Chicago Blackhawks (2002–03)	13–7–3–0	12,137	L
24	December 5, 2002	2–2 OT	@ St. Louis Blues (2002–03)	13–7–4–0	17,189	T
25	December 7, 2002	5–2	Carolina Hurricanes (2002–03)	14–7–4–0	15,328	W
26	December 10, 2002	4–2	@ Buffalo Sabres (2002–03)	15–7–4–0	9,966	W
27	December 12, 2002	5–2	@ Boston Bruins (2002–03)	16–7–4–0	11,893	W
28	December 14, 2002	4–3 OT	New Jersey Devils (2002–03)	17–7–4–0	17,284	W
29	December 16, 2002	2–3	Montreal Canadiens (2002–03)	17–8–4–0	16,807	L
30	December 18, 2002	3–0	@ New Jersey Devils (2002–03)	18–8–4–0	11,876	W
31	December 19, 2002	9–3	San Jose Sharks (2002–03)	19–8–4–0	14,848	W
32	December 21, 2002	3–1	@ Philadelphia Flyers (2002–03)	20–8–4–0	19,543	W
33	December 23, 2002	2–2 OT	Philadelphia Flyers (2002–03)	20–8–5–0	17,787	T
34	December 26, 2002	3–2	@ Buffalo Sabres (2002–03)	21–8–5–0	12,677	W
35	December 27, 2002	3–2 OT	Montreal Canadiens (2002–03)	22–8–5–0	18,500	W
36	December 30, 2002	2–3	@ Nashville Predators (2002–03)	22–9–5–0	11,584	L
37	December 31, 2002	6–3	@ Tampa Bay Lightning (2002–03)	23–9–5–0	14,452	W

January: 9–5–1–1 (home: 5–0–0–1; road: 4–5–1–0)

Game	Date	Score	Opponent	Record	Attendance	Recap
38	January 2, 2003	8–1	Atlanta Thrashers (2002–03)	24–9–5–0	18,026	W
39	January 4, 2003	1–2 OT	Buffalo Sabres (2002–03)	24–9–5–1	16,406	OTL
40	January 6, 2003	5–2	@ New York Rangers (2002–03)	25–9–5–1	18,200	W
41	January 8, 2003	4–6	@ Vancouver Canucks (2002–03)	25–10–5–1	18,422	L
42	January 9, 2003	1–0	@ Calgary Flames (2002–03)	26–10–5–1	16,058	W
43	January 11, 2003	2–0	@ Edmonton Oilers (2002–03)	27–10–5–1	16,839	W
44	January 14, 2003	7–0	Tampa Bay Lightning (2002–03)	28–10–5–1	18,500	W
45	January 16, 2003	3–1	Mighty Ducks of Anaheim (2002–03)	29–10–5–1	18,034	W
46	January 18, 2003	5–2	Washington Capitals (2002–03)	30–10–5–1	18,500	W
47	January 20, 2003	2–6	@ Tampa Bay Lightning (2002–03)	30–11–5–1	12,022	L
48	January 22, 2003	2–1	@ Florida Panthers (2002–03)	31–11–5–1	13,944	W
49	January 23, 2003	3–3 OT	@ Atlanta Thrashers (2002–03)	31–11–6–1	10,805	T
50	January 25, 2003	4–3 OT	Buffalo Sabres (2002–03)	32–11–6–1	18,241	W
51	January 27, 2003	3–5	@ Dallas Stars (2002–03)	32–12–6–1	18,532	L
52	January 29, 2003	2–3	@ Mighty Ducks of Anaheim (2002–03)	32–13–6–1	13,230	L
53	January 30, 2003	0–3	@ Los Angeles Kings (2002–03)	32–14–6–1	16,518	L

February: 8–3–1–0 (home: 5–2–1–0; road: 3–1–0–0)

Game	Date	Score	Opponent	Record	Attendance	Recap
54	February 5, 2003	5–3	@ New York Rangers (2002–03)	33–14–6–1	18,200	W
55	February 6, 2003	2–2 OT	Philadelphia Flyers (2002–03)	33–14–7–1	16,599	T
56	February 8, 2003	3–1	Atlanta Thrashers (2002–03)	34–14–7–1	18,371	W
57	February 12, 2003	3–0	@ Pittsburgh Penguins (2002–03)	35–14–7–1	14,197	W
58	February 13, 2003	2–0	Edmonton Oilers (2002–03)	36–14–7–1	18,115	W
59	February 15, 2003	1–2	@ Toronto Maple Leafs (2002–03)	36–15–7–1	19,415	L
60	February 17, 2003	3–2	New York Rangers (2002–03)	37–15–7–1	18,094	W
61	February 19, 2003	5–3	@ New Jersey Devils (2002–03)	38–15–7–1	12,298	W
62	February 20, 2003	3–4	Florida Panthers (2002–03)	38–16–7–1	15,250	L
63	February 22, 2003	4–0	Nashville Predators (2002–03)	39–16–7–1	17,971	W
64	February 25, 2003	0–3	Minnesota Wild (2002–03)	39–17–7–1	17,371	L
65	February 27, 2003	3–2 OT	Dallas Stars (2002–03)	40–17–7–1	18,500	W

March: 9–4–1–0 (home: 4–3–1–0; road: 5–1–0–0)

Game	Date	Score	Opponent	Record	Attendance	Recap
66	March 1, 2003	1–2	Tampa Bay Lightning (2002–03)	40–18–7–1	18,033	L
67	March 4, 2003	4–1	Toronto Maple Leafs (2002–03)	41–18–7–1	18,500	W
68	March 8, 2003	5–1	@ Pittsburgh Penguins (2002–03)	42–18–7–1	14,354	W
69	March 9, 2003	4–2	Pittsburgh Penguins (2002–03)	43–18–7–1	18,500	W
70	March 11, 2003	4–3 OT	Boston Bruins (2002–03)	44–18–7–1	18,230	W
71	March 13, 2003	3–2 OT	New York Rangers (2002–03)	45–18–7–1	18,011	W
72	March 15, 2003	2–5	New York Islanders (2002–03)	45–19–7–1	18,349	L
73	March 16, 2003	2–6	@ Detroit Red Wings (2002–03)	45–20–7–1	20,058	L
74	March 18, 2003	6–5	@ Carolina Hurricanes (2002–03)	46–20–7–1	16,531	W
75	March 21, 2003	5–1	@ Atlanta Thrashers (2002–03)	47–20–7–1	16,114	W
76	March 22, 2003	3–1	@ Florida Panthers (2002–03)	48–20–7–1	18,613	W
77	March 25, 2003	2–2 OT	Colorado Avalanche (2002–03)	48–20–8–1	18,036	T
78	March 28, 2003	2–3	Washington Capitals (2002–03)	48–21–8–1	18,311	L
79	March 29, 2003	3–1	@ Montreal Canadiens (2002–03)	49–21–8–1	21,273	W

April: 3–0–0–0 (home: 1–0–0–0; road: 2–0–0–0)

Game	Date	Score	Opponent	Record	Attendance	Recap
80	April 1, 2003	3–2	Boston Bruins (2002–03)	50–21–8–1	18,500	W
81	April 3, 2003	5–1	@ Washington Capitals (2002–03)	51–21–8–1	15,784	W
82	April 5, 2003	3–1	@ Toronto Maple Leafs (2002–03)	52–21–8–1	19,445	W

Legend: W Win (2 points) L Loss (0 points) T Tie (1 point) OTL Overtime loss (1 point)

=== Playoffs ===
2003 Stanley Cup playoffs
Eastern Conference Quarterfinals vs. (8) New York Islanders – Senators win 4–1

Game	Date	Score	Opponent	Series	Attendance	Recap
1	April 9, 2003	0–3	New York Islanders	Islanders lead 1–0	18,273	L
2	April 12, 2003	3–0	New York Islanders	Series tied 1–1	18,500	W
3	April 14, 2003	3–2 2OT	@ New York Islanders	Senators lead 2–1	16,234	W
4	April 16, 2003	3–1	@ New York Islanders	Senators lead 3–1	16,234	W
5	April 17, 2003	4–1	New York Islanders	Senators win 4–1	18,500	W

Eastern Conference Semifinals vs. (4) Philadelphia Flyers – Senators win 4–2

Game	Date	Score	Opponent	Series	Attendance	Recap
1	April 25, 2003	4–2	Philadelphia Flyers	Senators lead 1–0	18,197	W
2	April 27, 2003	4–2	Philadelphia Flyers	Series tied 1–1	18,500	L
3	April 29, 2003	3–2 OT	@ Philadelphia Flyers	Senators lead 2–1	19,680	W
4	May 1, 2003	0–1	@ Philadelphia Flyers	Series tied 2–2	19,842	L
5	May 3, 2003	5–2	Philadelphia Flyers	Senators lead 3–2	18,500	W
6	May 5, 2003	5–1	@ Philadelphia Flyers	Senators win 4–2	19,454	W

Eastern Conference Finals vs. (2) New Jersey Devils – Devils win 4–3

Game	Date	Score	Opponent	Series	Attendance	Recap
1	May 10, 2003	3–2 OT	New Jersey Devils	Senators lead 1–0	18,500	W
2	May 13, 2003	1–4	New Jersey Devils	Series tied 1–1	18,500	L
3	May 15, 2003	0–1	@ New Jersey Devils	Devils lead 2–1	19,040	L
4	May 17, 2003	2–5	@ New Jersey Devils	Devils lead 3–1	19,040	L
5	May 19, 2003	3–1	New Jersey Devils	Devils lead 3–2	18,500	W
6	May 21, 2003	2–1 OT	@ New Jersey Devils	Series tied 3–3	19,040	W
7	May 23, 2003	2–3	New Jersey Devils	Devils win 4–3	18,500	L

Legend: W Win L Loss

== Player statistics ==
=== Scoring ===
- Position abbreviations: C = Centre; D = Defence; G = Goaltender; LW = Left wing; RW = Right wing
- † = Joined team via a transaction (e.g., trade, waivers, signing) during the season. Stats reflect time with the Senators only.
- ‡ = Left team via a transaction (e.g., trade, waivers, release) during the season. Stats reflect time with the Senators only.

No.	Player	Pos	Regular season						Playoffs					
No.	Player	Pos	GP	G	A	Pts	+/-	PIM	GP	G	A	Pts	+/-	PIM
18	Marian Hossa	RW	80	45	35	80	8	34	18	5	11	16	−1	6
11	Daniel Alfredsson	RW	78	27	51	78	15	42	18	4	4	8	−3	12
28	Todd White	C	80	25	35	60	19	28	18	5	1	6	−1	6
9	Martin Havlat	RW	67	24	35	59	20	30	18	5	6	11	4	14
14	Radek Bonk	C	70	22	32	54	6	36	18	6	5	11	2	10
6	Wade Redden	D	76	10	35	45	23	70	18	1	8	9	1	10
3	Zdeno Chara	D	74	9	30	39	29	116	18	1	6	7	3	14
12	Mike Fisher	C	74	18	20	38	13	54	18	2	2	4	−1	16
20	Magnus Arvedson	LW	80	16	21	37	13	48	18	1	5	6	−4	16
22	Shaun Van Allen	C	78	12	20	32	17	66	18	1	1	2	−1	12
23	Karel Rachunek	D	58	4	25	29	23	30	17	1	3	4	−5	14
15	Peter Schaefer	LW	75	6	17	23	11	32	16	2	3	5	3	6
39	Jason Spezza	C	33	7	14	21	−3	8	3	1	1	2	1	0
19	Petr Schastlivy	LW	33	9	10	19	3	4	—	—	—	—	—	—
4	Chris Phillips	D	78	3	16	19	7	71	18	2	4	6	3	12
24	Anton Volchenkov	D	57	3	13	16	−4	40	17	1	1	2	3	4
16	Jody Hull	RW	70	3	8	11	−3	14	2	0	0	0	0	0
25	Chris Neil	RW	68	6	4	10	8	147	15	1	0	1	1	24
21	Bryan Smolinski†	C	10	3	5	8	1	2	18	2	7	9	4	6
26	Vaclav Varada†	RW	11	2	6	8	3	8	18	2	4	6	4	18
34	Shane Hnidy	D	67	0	8	8	−1	130	1	0	0	0	0	0
7	Curtis Leschyshyn	D	54	1	6	7	11	18	18	0	1	1	0	10
2	Brian Pothier	D	14	2	4	6	11	6	1	0	0	0	0	2
21	Steve Martins‡	C	14	2	3	5	3	10	—	—	—	—	—	—
38	Brad Smyth	RW	12	3	1	4	−2	15	—	—	—	—	—	—
29	Joel Kwiatkowski‡	D	20	0	2	2	2	6	—	—	—	—	—	—
10	Toni Dahlman	RW	12	1	0	1	−1	0	—	—	—	—	—	—
40	Patrick Lalime	G	67	0	1	1		6	18	0	0	0		0
33	Josh Langfeld	RW	12	0	1	1	2	4	—	—	—	—	—	—
27	Dennis Bonvie	RW	12	0	0	0	−1	29	—	—	—	—	—	—
1	Ray Emery	G	3	0	0	0		0	—	—	—	—	—	—
31	Martin Prusek	G	18	0	0	0		0	—	—	—	—	—	—
32	Rob Ray†	RW	5	0	0	0	0	4	—	—	—	—	—	—
36	Joey Tetarenko†	RW	2	0	0	0	0	5	—	—	—	—	—	—

=== Goaltending ===
No.	Player	Regular season										Playoffs								
No.	Player	GP	W	L	T	SA	GA	GAA	SV%	SO	TOI	GP	W	L	SA	GA	GAA	SV%	SO	TOI
40	Patrick Lalime	67	39	20	7	1591	142	2.16	.911	8	3943	18	11	7	449	34	1.82	.924	1	1122
31	Martin Prusek	18	12	2	1	415	37	2.37	.911	0	935	—	—	—	—	—	—	—	—	—
1	Ray Emery	3	1	0	0	26	2	1.41	.923	0	85	—	—	—	—	—	—	—	—	—

== Awards and records ==
=== Awards ===
Type	Award/honour	Recipient	Ref
League (in-season)	NHL All-Star Game selection	Zdeno Chara	
League (in-season)	NHL All-Star Game selection	Marian Hossa	
League (in-season)	NHL All-Star Game selection	Patrick Lalime (Note: Lalime was an injury replacement for Ed Belfour of the Toronto Maple Leafs.)	
League (in-season)	NHL All-Star Game selection	Jacques Martin (coach)	
League (in-season)	NHL Player of the Month	Todd White (December)	
League (in-season)	NHL YoungStars Game	Anton Volchenkov	
Team	Molson Cup	Daniel Alfredsson	

=== Milestones ===
Milestone	Player	Date	Ref
First game	Anton Volchenkov	October 10, 2002	
First game	Jason Spezza	October 24, 2002	
First game	Ray Emery	January 8, 2003	
25th shutout	Patrick Lalime	January 14, 2003	
750th game coached	Jacques Martin	February 20, 2003	

== Transactions ==
The Senators were involved in the following transactions from June 14, 2002, the day after the deciding game of the 2002 Stanley Cup Final, through June 9, 2003, the day of the deciding game of the 2003 Stanley Cup Final.

=== Trades ===
Date	Details		Ref
June 22, 2002	To New York Rangers: 3rd-round pick in 2002; 4th-round pick in 2002	To Ottawa Senators: 3rd-round pick in 2002	
June 23, 2002	To Tampa Bay Lightning: 7th-round pick in 2002	To Ottawa Senators: Josef Boumedienne	
June 29, 2002	To Atlanta Thrashers: Shawn McEachern; 6th-round pick in 2004	To Ottawa Senators: Brian Pothier	
September 21, 2002	To Vancouver Canucks: Sami Salo	To Ottawa Senators: Peter Schaefer	
October 1, 2002	To Florida Panthers: Jani Hurme	To Ottawa Senators: Rights to Billy Thompson; Rights to Greg Watson	
December 16, 2002	To Washington Capitals: Josef Boumedienne	To Ottawa Senators: Dean Melanson	
January 15, 2003	To Washington Capitals: Joel Kwiatkowski	To Ottawa Senators: 9th-round pick in 2003	
February 25, 2003	To Buffalo Sabres: Jakub Klepis	To Ottawa Senators: Vaclav Varada; 5th-round pick in 2003	
March 4, 2003	To Florida Panthers: Simon Lajeunesse	To Ottawa Senators: Joey Tetarenko	
March 10, 2003	To Buffalo Sabres: Future considerations	To Ottawa Senators: Rob Ray	
March 10, 2003	To Nashville Predators: Future considerations	To Ottawa Senators: Bob Wren	
March 11, 2003	To Los Angeles Kings: Rights to Tim Gleason	To Ottawa Senators: Bryan Smolinski	

=== Players acquired ===
Date	Player	Former team	Term	Via	Ref
July 24, 2002	Shaun Van Allen	Montreal Canadiens	multi-year	Free agency	
August 1, 2002	Brad Smyth	New York Rangers	1-year	Free agency	
August 26, 2002	Dennis Bonvie	Boston Bruins	1-year	Free agency	
June 2, 2003	Brian McGrattan	Binghamton Senators (AHL)	1-year	Free agency	

=== Players lost ===
Date	Player	New team	Via (Note: In parentheses is the player's free agency group on July 1 if applicable.)	Ref
July 3, 2002	Bill Muckalt	Minnesota Wild	Free agency (UFA)	
August 1, 2002	Chris Herperger	Atlanta Thrashers	Free agency (UFA)	
August 1, 2002	Travis Richards	Grand Rapids Griffins (AHL)	Free agency (VI)	
August 2, 2002	Ricard Persson	Eisbaren Berlin (DEL)	Free agency (III)	
September 13, 2002	Jason Doig	Washington Capitals	Free agency (VI)	
October 1, 2002	Kevin Grimes	Jackson Bandits (ECHL)	Free agency (UFA)	
October 25, 2002	Benoit Brunet		Retirement (III)	
January 15, 2003	Steve Martins	St. Louis Blues	Waivers	

=== Signings ===
Date	Player	Term	Contract type	Ref
June 27, 2002	Joel Kwiatkowski	multi-year	Re-signing	
July 15, 2002	Daniel Alfredsson	2-year	Re-signing	
July 15, 2002	Christoph Schubert	3-year	Entry-level	
July 15, 2002	Anton Volchenkov	3-year	Entry-level	
July 31, 2002	Josh Langfeld	1-year	Re-signing	
July 31, 2002	Sami Salo	1-year	Re-signing	
July 31, 2002	Jeff Ulmer	1-year	Re-signing	
August 1, 2002	Josef Boumedienne	1-year	Re-signing	
August 1, 2002	Steve Martins	multi-year	Re-signing	
August 1, 2002	Petr Schastlivy	multi-year	Re-signing	
August 8, 2002	Radek Bonk	2-year	Re-signing	
August 8, 2002	Chris Phillips	2-year	Re-signing	
August 21, 2002	Jody Hull	1-year	Re-signing	
August 26, 2002	Brian Pothier	multi-year	Re-signing	
September 14, 2002	Mike Fisher	multi-year	Re-signing	
September 14, 2002	Chris Neil	multi-year	Re-signing	
September 21, 2002	Peter Schaefer	multi-year	Re-signing	
November 8, 2002	Karel Rachunek	2-year	Re-signing	
November 27, 2002	Billy Thompson	multi-year	Entry-level	
June 2, 2003	Brooks Laich	multi-year	Entry-level	
June 2, 2003	Jan Platil	multi-year	Entry-level	
June 2, 2003	Greg Watson	multi-year	Entry-level	
June 6, 2003	Shaun Van Allen	1-year	Option exercised	

== Draft picks ==
Ottawa's draft picks from the 2002 NHL entry draft held on June 22 and June 23, 2002 at the Air Canada Centre in Toronto, Ontario.

Round	#	Player	Nationality	College/Junior/Club team (League)
1	16	Jakub Klepis	Czech Republic	Portland Winter Hawks (WHL)
2	47	Alexei Kaigorodov	Russia	Metallurg Magnitogorsk (RSL)
3	75	Arttu Luttinen	Finland	HIFK (SM-liiga)
4	113	Scott Dobben	Canada	Erie Otters (OHL)
4	125	Johan Bjork	Sweden	Malmö IF (Elitserien)
5	150	Brock Hooton	Canada	Quesnel Millionaires (BCHL)
8	246	Josef Vavra	Czech Republic	HC Vsetín (Czech Extraliga)
9	276	Vitaly Atyushov	Russia	Molot-Prikamye Perm (RSL)

== Farm teams ==
=== Binghamton Senators ===
In 2002–03, the Senators moved their American Hockey League affiliate to Binghamton, New York and named the team the Binghamton Senators. John Paddock was named head coach of the team.

The Senators finished in first place in the East Division, and third place in the Eastern Conference, with a 43–26–9–2 record, earning 97 points. In the post-season, Binghamton defeated the Worcester IceCats and the Bridgeport Sound Tigers before losing to the Hamilton Bulldogs in the Eastern Conference finals.

Antoine Vermette led the team with 34 goals and 62 points. In only 43 games, Jason Spezza scored 22 goals and 54 points in his first professional season. In goal, Ray Emery had a 27–17–6 record with a 2.42 GAA and a .924 save percentage. In the post-season, Brad Smyth led the team with seven goals and 13 points. Emery posted eight wins and had a 2.83 GAA with a .912 save percentage in the playoffs.

== See also ==
- 2002–03 NHL season
