= Andre Savage =

Canadian ice hockey player

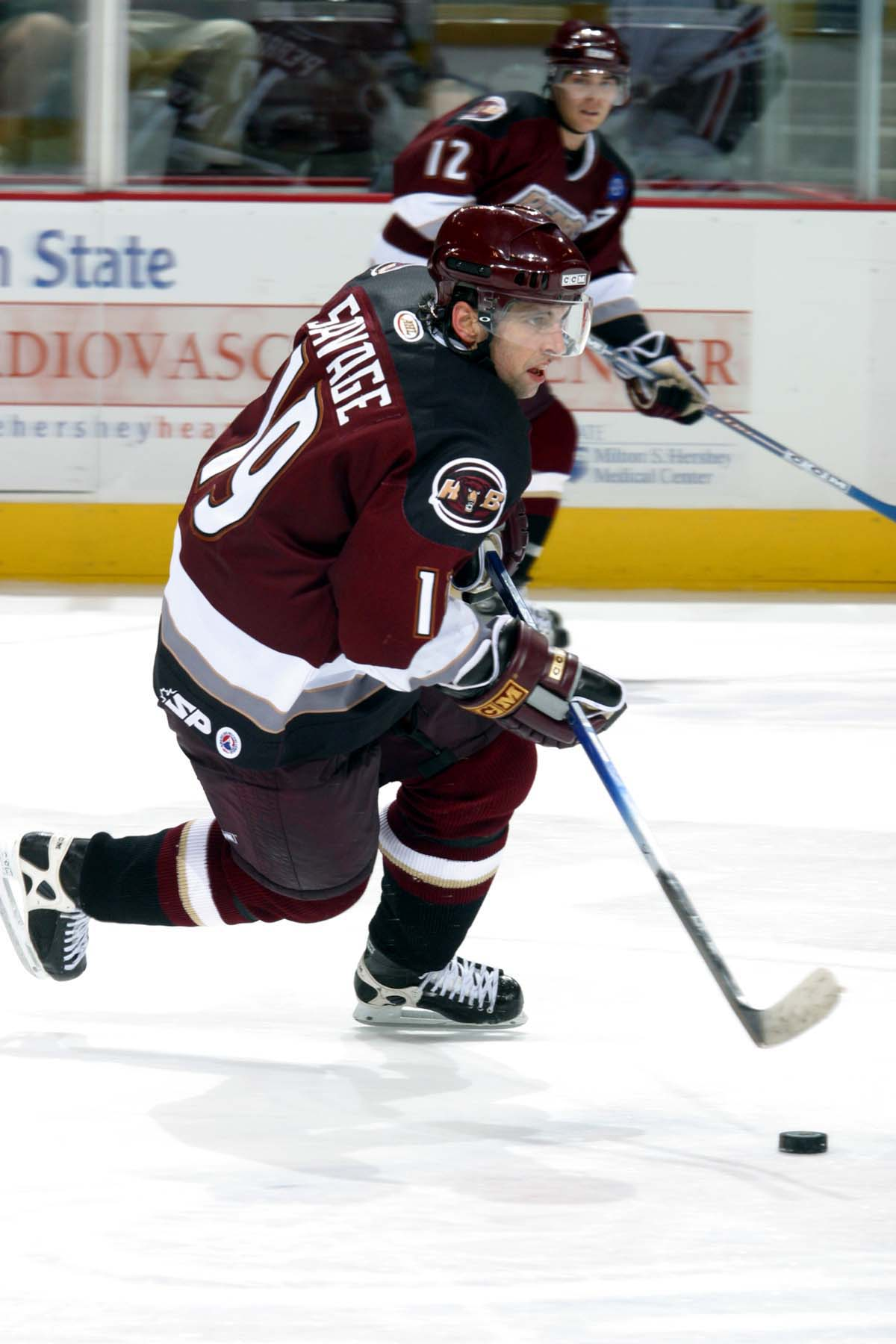
- Savage with the Hershey Bears in 2004
- Born: May 27, 1975 (age 51) Ottawa, Ontario, Canada
- Height: 6 ft 0 in (183 cm)
- Weight: 195 lb (88 kg; 13 st 13 lb)
- Position: Centre
- Shot: Right
- Played for: Boston Bruins; Philadelphia Flyers; Malmö Redhawks; Thomas Sabo Ice Tigers
- NHL draft: Undrafted
- Playing career: 1998–2010

Andre Ronald Savage (born May 27, 1975) is a Canadian former professional ice hockey centre who played 66 games in the National Hockey League (NHL) between the Boston Bruins and the Philadelphia Flyers. He completed his professional career in Germany with the Thomas Sabo Ice Tigers of the Deutsche Eishockey Liga (DEL).

== Playing career ==
Savage played collegiate hockey with the Michigan Tech Huskies of the Western Collegiate Hockey Association. At the completion of his senior season and having gone undrafted in the NHL entry draft he signed with the Boston Bruins as a free agent in 1998 and spent three seasons splitting his time between Boston and the Providence Bruins. He signed with the Vancouver Canucks in 2001, but spent the entire season with the club's American Hockey League affiliate in the Manitoba Moose. He then signed with the Philadelphia Flyers in 2002 where he played 16 games. It would be Savage's last season in the NHL as he spent the rest of his Flyers spell with the Philadelphia Phantoms and was loaned back to the Providence Bruins in 2003.

On July 22, 2004, he signed a one-year contract with the Colorado Avalanche, but he never played for the Avalanche thanks to the NHL lockout. Instead he played in the AHL with the Avalanche's affiliate in the Hershey Bears before being loaned out to the San Antonio Rampage.

In 2005, Savage embarked on a career abroad and moved to Sweden, signing with the Malmö Redhawks in the second tier HockeyAllsvenskan for one season before moving to the Sinupret Ice Tigers in Germany's Deutsche Eishockey Liga. He retired from professional hockey upon completing his fourth season with the Ice Tigers in 2009–10.

== Career statistics ==
			Regular season					Playoffs
Season	Team	League	GP	G	A	Pts	PIM	GP	G	A	Pts	PIM
1991–92	Gloucester Rangers	CJHL	53	31	32	63	16	—	—	—	—	—
1992–93	Gloucester Rangers	CJHL	54	34	34	68	38	—	—	—	—	—
1993–94	Gloucester Rangers	CJHL	57	43	74	117	44	—	—	—	—	—
1994–95	Michigan Tech	WCHA	39	7	17	24	56	—	—	—	—	—
1995–96	Michigan Tech	WCHA	40	13	27	40	42	—	—	—	—	—
1996–97	Michigan Tech	WCHA	37	18	20	38	34	—	—	—	—	—
1997–98	Michigan Tech	WCHA	33	14	27	41	34	—	—	—	—	—
1998–99	Providence Bruins	AHL	63	27	42	69	54	5	0	1	1	0
1998–99	Boston Bruins	NHL	6	1	0	1	0	—	—	—	—	—
1999–00	Providence Bruins	AHL	30	15	17	32	22	14	6	7	13	22
1999–00	Boston Bruins	NHL	43	7	13	20	10	—	—	—	—	—
2000–01	Providence Bruins	AHL	35	13	15	28	47	17	3	4	7	18
2000–01	Boston Bruins	NHL	1	0	0	0	0	—	—	—	—	—
2001–02	Manitoba Moose	AHL	76	35	26	61	115	6	2	3	5	16
2002–03	Philadelphia Phantoms	AHL	64	11	31	42	66	—	—	—	—	—
2002–03	Philadelphia Flyers	NHL	16	2	1	3	4	—	—	—	—	—
2003–04	Philadelphia Phantoms	AHL	8	1	0	1	12	—	—	—	—	—
2003–04	Providence Bruins	AHL	63	16	30	46	94	1	0	0	0	2
2004–05	Hershey Bears	AHL	53	7	23	30	36	—	—	—	—	—
2004–05	San Antonio Rampage	AHL	20	1	4	5	12	—	—	—	—	—
2005–06	Malmö Redhawks	Allsv	39	13	16	29	54	10	4	3	7	10
2006–07	Sinupret Ice Tigers	DEL	36	16	18	34	26	13	3	5	8	12
2007–08	Sinupret Ice Tigers	DEL	53	18	29	47	54	5	1	1	2	2
2008–09	Sinupret Ice Tigers	DEL	51	14	23	37	78	5	1	3	4	2
2009–10	Thomas Sabo Ice Tigers	DEL	53	17	27	44	59	5	0	3	3	2
NHL totals			66	10	14	24	14	—	—	—	—	—

== Awards and honors ==
Award	Year
All-WCHA Third Team	1996–97
All-WCHA First Team	1997–98
