= Guillaume Lefebvre =

Canadian ice hockey player

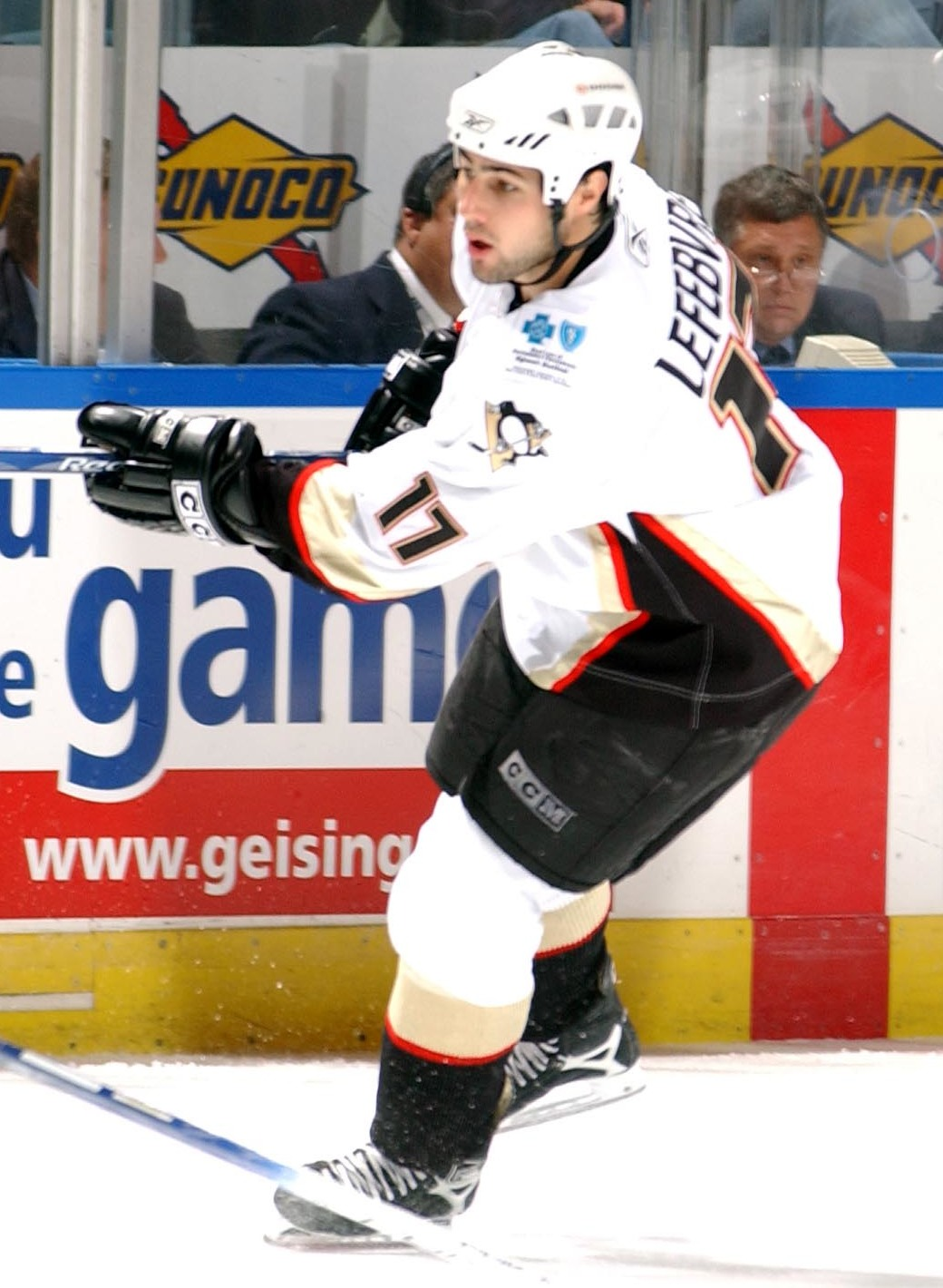
- Lefebvre with the Wilkes-Barre/Scranton Penguins in 2005
- Born: May 7, 1981 (age 45) Amos, Quebec, Canada
- Height: 6 ft 1 in (185 cm)
- Weight: 195 lb (88 kg; 13 st 13 lb)
- Position: Left wing
- Shot: Left
- Played for: Philadelphia Flyers; Pittsburgh Penguins; Boston Bruins
- NHL draft: 227th overall, 2000; Philadelphia Flyers
- Playing career: 2001–2015

Guillaume Lefebvre (born May 7, 1981) is a former Canadian professional ice hockey left winger who played four seasons in the National Hockey League (NHL) for the Philadelphia Flyers, Pittsburgh Penguins, and Boston Bruins.

== Playing career ==
Lefebvre was drafted in the seventh round, 227th overall, of the 2000 NHL entry draft by the Philadelphia Flyers. After spending three seasons in the Quebec Major Junior Hockey League (QMJHL), Lefebvre made his professional debut with the Philadelphia Phantoms of the American Hockey League (AHL) during the 2001 AHL Playoffs.

Lefebvre captured the Phantoms' Rookie of the Year Award after tallying 19 goals and adding 15 assists for 34 points in 2002.

During the 2002–03 season Lefebvre was traded from the Philadelphia Flyers to the Phoenix Coyotes, but was then traded to the Pittsburgh Penguins before playing a game as a Coyote. His first NHL goal came as a member of the Penguins.

On September 12, 2009 Lefebvre was invited to the Boston Bruins' NHL training camp, and on September 26, his work in the pre-season was rewarded with a one-year contract to play with the Bruins.

== Awards and honours ==
- Philadelphia Phantoms' Rookie of the Year (2002)

== Career statistics ==
			Regular season					Playoffs
Season	Team	League	GP	G	A	Pts	PIM	GP	G	A	Pts	PIM
1996–97	Amos Forestiers	QMAAA	40	7	12	19	14	—	—	—	—	—
1997–98	Amos Forestiers	QMAAA	42	12	16	28	100	6	5	4	9
1998–99	Shawinigan Cataractes	QMJHL	40	3	1	4	49	—	—	—	—	—
1998–99	Cape Breton Screaming Eagles	QMJHL	24	2	7	9	13	5	0	1	1	0
1999–2000	Cape Breton Screaming Eagles	QMJHL	44	26	28	54	82	—	—	—	—	—
1999–2000	Quebec Remparts	QMJHL	2	3	1	4	0	—	—	—	—	—
1999–2000	Rouyn–Noranda Huskies	QMJHL	25	4	11	15	39	11	4	0	4	25
2000–01	Rouyn–Noranda Huskies	QMJHL	61	24	43	67	160	9	3	1	4	22
2000–01	Philadelphia Phantoms	AHL	—	—	—	—	—	9	0	1	1	2
2001–02	Philadelphia Phantoms	AHL	78	19	15	34	111	5	0	0	0	4
2001–02	Philadelphia Flyers	NHL	3	0	0	0	0	—	—	—	—	—
2002–03	Philadelphia Phantoms	AHL	47	7	6	13	113	—	—	—	—	—
2002–03	Philadelphia Flyers	NHL	14	0	0	0	4	—	—	—	—	—
2002–03	Wilkes–Barre/Scranton Penguins	AHL	1	1	0	1	0	5	0	0	0	6
2002–03	Pittsburgh Penguins	NHL	12	2	4	6	0	—	—	—	—	—
2003–04	Wilkes–Barre/Scranton Penguins	AHL	64	4	12	16	78	14	1	0	1	19
2004–05	Wilkes–Barre/Scranton Penguins	AHL	34	3	3	6	76	11	1	0	1	23
2005–06	Wilkes–Barre/Scranton Penguins	AHL	66	16	19	35	119	8	0	2	2	14
2005–06	Pittsburgh Penguins	NHL	9	0	0	0	9	—	—	—	—	—
2006–07	Saint–Jean Chiefs	LNAH	48	20	33	53	135	—	—	—	—	—
2007–08	Saint–Jean Chiefs	LNAH	46	16	36	52	157	—	—	—	—	—
2008–09	Springfield Falcons	AHL	70	4	9	13	206	—	—	—	—	—
2009–10	Providence Bruins	AHL	56	5	8	13	154	—	—	—	—	—
2009–10	Boston Bruins	NHL	1	0	0	0	0	—	—	—	—	—
2010–11	Bakersfield Condors	ECHL	28	8	15	23	72	4	2	3	5	6
2011–12	Graz 99ers	AUT	33	8	7	15	136	—	—	—	—	—
2012–13	Graz 99ers	AUT	51	4	11	15	127	4	0	0	0	12
2013–14	Graz 99ers	AUT	42	10	10	20	114	—	—	—	—	—
2014–15	Ducs d'Angers	FRA	26	9	8	17	110	10	0	2	2	26
AHL totals			416	59	72	131	851	52	2	3	5	61
NHL totals			39	2	4	6	13	—	—	—	—	—
AUT totals			126	22	28	50	377	4	0	0	0	12
