= 2002–03 Toronto Maple Leafs season =

NHL hockey team season

2002–03 Toronto Maple Leafs
- Division: 2nd Northeast
- Conference: 5th Eastern
- 2002–03 record: 44–28–7–3
- Home record: 24–13–4–0
- Road record: 20–15–3–3
- Goals for: 236
- Goals against: 208

Team information
- General manager: Pat Quinn
- Coach: Pat Quinn
- Captain: Mats Sundin
- Alternate captains: Bryan McCabe; Gary Roberts
- Arena: Air Canada Centre
- Average attendance: 19,240
- Minor league affiliates: St. John's Maple Leafs; Greensboro Generals

Team leaders
- Goals: Mats Sundin (37)
- Assists: Alexander Mogilny (46)
- Points: Alexander Mogilny (79)
- Penalty minutes: Wade Belak (196)
- Plus/minus: Tomáš Kaberle (+20)
- Wins: Ed Belfour (37)
- Goals against average: Ed Belfour (2.26)

The 2002–03 Toronto Maple Leafs season was the 86th season of the franchise, and the 76th season as the Maple Leafs. The team qualified for the playoffs for the fifth year in a row, losing to the Philadelphia Flyers in the quarterfinals.

== Off-season ==
Key dates prior to the start of the season:

- The 2002 NHL entry draft
- The free agency period began on July 1.

The Leafs signed free agent goaltender Ed Belfour to be their starting goaltender to replace the departed Curtis Joseph, who signed with the Detroit Red Wings to be their starting goaltender after Dominik Hašek retired following their Stanley Cup championship the previous season.

== Regular season ==
The Maple Leafs were the most penalized team during the regular season, being penalized 426 times.

=== Season standings ===
Northeast Division
No.	CR		GP	W	L	T	OTL	GF	GA	Pts
1	1	**Ottawa Senators**	82	52	21	8	1	263	182	113
2	5	**Toronto Maple Leafs**	82	44	28	7	3	236	208	98
3	7	**Boston Bruins**	82	36	31	11	4	245	237	87
4	10	Montreal Canadiens	82	30	35	8	9	206	234	77
5	12	Buffalo Sabres	82	27	37	10	8	190	219	72

Note: CR = Conference rank; GP = Games played; W = Wins; L = Losses; T = Ties; OTL = Overtime loss; GF = Goals for; GA = Goals against; Pts = Points
Bolded teams qualified for the playoffs.

Eastern Conference
R		Div	GP	W	L	T	OTL	GF	GA	Pts
**1**	**P-** Ottawa Senators	**NE**	**82**	**52**	**21**	**8**	**1**	**263**	**182**	113
**2**	**Y-** New Jersey Devils	**AT**	**82**	**46**	**20**	**10**	**6**	**216**	**166**	108
**3**	**Y-** Tampa Bay Lightning	**SE**	**82**	**36**	**25**	**16**	**5**	**219**	**210**	93
**4**	**X-** Philadelphia Flyers	**AT**	**82**	**45**	**20**	**13**	**4**	**211**	**166**	107
**5**	**X-** Toronto Maple Leafs	**NE**	**82**	**44**	**28**	**7**	**3**	**236**	**208**	98
**6**	**X-** Washington Capitals	**SE**	**82**	**39**	**29**	**8**	**6**	**224**	**220**	92
**7**	**X-** Boston Bruins	**NE**	**82**	**36**	**31**	**11**	**4**	**245**	**237**	87
**8**	**X-** New York Islanders	**AT**	**82**	**35**	**34**	**11**	**2**	**224**	**231**	83
8.5
9	New York Rangers	AT	82	32	36	10	4	210	231	78
10	Montreal Canadiens	NE	82	30	35	8	9	206	234	77
11	Atlanta Thrashers	SE	82	31	39	7	5	226	284	74
12	Buffalo Sabres	NE	82	27	37	10	8	190	219	72
13	Florida Panthers	SE	82	24	36	13	9	176	237	70
14	Pittsburgh Penguins	AT	82	27	44	6	5	189	255	65
15	Carolina Hurricanes	SE	82	22	43	11	6	171	240	61

Divisions: AT – Atlantic, NE – Northeast, SE – Southeast

P – Clinched Presidents Trophy; Y – Clinched division; X – Clinched playoff spot

== Playoffs ==
The Maple Leafs qualified for the Stanley Cup playoffs for the fifth consecutive year. They lost to the Philadelphia Flyers in 7 games in the first round.

== Schedule and results ==
=== Regular season ===
2002–03 regular season
October: 3–6–2–0 (home: 2–5–1–0; road: 1–1–1–0)

Game	Date	Score	Opponent	Record	Recap
1	October 10, 2002	6–0	@ Pittsburgh Penguins (2002–03)	1–0–0–0	W
2	October 12, 2002	1–2	Ottawa Senators (2002–03)	1–1–0–0	L
3	October 14, 2002	4–5	Pittsburgh Penguins (2002–03)	1–2–0–0	L
4	October 15, 2002	4–5	@ New York Rangers (2002–03)	1–3–0–0	L
5	October 17, 2002	5–3	Phoenix Coyotes (2002–03)	2–3–0–0	W
6	October 19, 2002	2–2 OT	@ Montreal Canadiens (2002–03)	2–3–1–0	T
7	October 21, 2002	1–4	Boston Bruins (2002–03)	2–4–1–0	L
8	October 23, 2002	1–4	Florida Panthers (2002–03)	2–5–1–0	L
9	October 26, 2002	3–4	New York Rangers (2002–03)	2–6–1–0	L
10	October 28, 2002	5–2	Mighty Ducks of Anaheim (2002–03)	3–6–1–0	W
11	October 31, 2002	3–3 OT	Atlanta Thrashers (2002–03)	3–6–2–0	T

November: 8–5–0–0 (home: 6–2–0–0; road: 2–3–0–0)

Game	Date	Score	Opponent	Record	Recap
12	November 2, 2002 †	2–5	Montreal Canadiens (2002–03)	3–7–2–0	L
13	November 5, 2002	4–3	Tampa Bay Lightning (2002–03)	4–7–2–0	W
14	November 8, 2002	1–2	@ Dallas Stars (2002–03)	4–8–2–0	L
15	November 9, 2002	3–6	@ St. Louis Blues (2002–03)	4–9–2–0	L
16	November 12, 2002	4–3 OT	Los Angeles Kings (2002–03)	5–9–2–0	W
17	November 15, 2002	3–2	@ Buffalo Sabres (2002–03)	6–9–2–0	W
18	November 16, 2002	1–2	Detroit Red Wings (2002–03)	6–10–2–0	L
19	November 19, 2002	2–0	Boston Bruins (2002–03)	7–10–2–0	W
20	November 23, 2002	6–0	Philadelphia Flyers (2002–03)	8–10–2–0	W
21	November 25, 2002	0–2	@ Ottawa Senators (2002–03)	8–11–2–0	L
22	November 26, 2002	5–4	Washington Capitals (2002–03)	9–11–2–0	W
23	November 29, 2002	3–0	@ Philadelphia Flyers (2002–03)	10–11–2–0	W
24	November 30, 2002	3–1	Buffalo Sabres (2002–03)	11–11–2–0	W

December: 8–3–2–1 (home: 5–0–1–0; road: 3–3–1–1)

Game	Date	Score	Opponent	Record	Recap
25	December 3, 2002	4–3 OT	Tampa Bay Lightning (2002–03)	12–11–2–0	W
26	December 6, 2002	2–4	@ New York Islanders (2002–03)	12–12–2–0	L
27	December 7, 2002	1–0	New Jersey Devils (2002–03)	13–12–2–0	W
28	December 10, 2002	4–2	Pittsburgh Penguins (2002–03)	14–12–2–0	W
29	December 12, 2002	1–2	@ Philadelphia Flyers (2002–03)	14–13–2–0	L
30	December 14, 2002	4–1	New York Rangers (2002–03)	15–13–2–0	W
31	December 16, 2002	0–1	@ Atlanta Thrashers (2002–03)	15–14–2–0	L
32	December 18, 2002	2–2 OT	@ Florida Panthers (2002–03)	15–14–3–0	T
33	December 19, 2002	2–1	@ Tampa Bay Lightning (2002–03)	16–14–3–0	W
34	December 21, 2002	3–3 OT	San Jose Sharks (2002–03)	16–14–4–0	T
35	December 23, 2002	5–1	Atlanta Thrashers (2002–03)	17–14–4–0	W
36	December 27, 2002	4–3	@ Calgary Flames (2002–03)	18–14–4–0	W
37	December 28, 2002	2–3 OT	@ Edmonton Oilers (2002–03)	18–14–4–1	OTL
38	December 31, 2002	5–3	@ Vancouver Canucks (2002–03)	19–14–4–1	W

January: 8–6–0–0 (home: 3–2–0–0; road: 5–4–0–0)

Game	Date	Score	Opponent	Record	Recap
39	January 3, 2003	0–2	@ New Jersey Devils (2002–03)	19–15–4–1	L
40	January 4, 2003	2–1	New Jersey Devils (2002–03)	20–15–4–1	W
41	January 7, 2003	5–2	Boston Bruins (2002–03)	21–15–4–1	W
42	January 9, 2003	4–2	@ Pittsburgh Penguins (2002–03)	22–15–4–1	W
43	January 11, 2003	2–6	@ Boston Bruins (2002–03)	22–16–4–1	L
44	January 13, 2003	1–5	@ New York Rangers (2002–03)	22–17–4–1	L
45	January 14, 2003	3–2	Calgary Flames (2002–03)	23–17–4–1	W
46	January 17, 2003	4–1	@ Washington Capitals (2002–03)	24–17–4–1	W
47	January 18, 2003	3–2 OT	@ Montreal Canadiens (2002–03)	25–17–4–1	W
48	January 21, 2003	1–3	Philadelphia Flyers (2002–03)	25–18–4–1	L
49	January 24, 2003	0–4	@ Buffalo Sabres (2002–03)	25–19–4–1	L
50	January 25, 2003	0–3	Colorado Avalanche (2002–03)	25–20–4–1	L
51	January 29, 2003	3–2	@ Carolina Hurricanes (2002–03)	26–20–4–1	W
52	January 30, 2003	5–2	@ Atlanta Thrashers (2002–03)	27–20–4–1	W

February: 9–3–0–0 (home: 4–2–0–0; road: 5–1–0–0)

Game	Date	Score	Opponent	Record	Recap
53	February 5, 2003	6–0	@ Florida Panthers (2002–03)	28–20–4–1	W
54	February 6, 2003	3–2 OT	@ Tampa Bay Lightning (2002–03)	29–20–4–1	W
55	February 8, 2003	3–1	Montreal Canadiens (2002–03)	30–20–4–1	W
56	February 11, 2003	4–5	Edmonton Oilers (2002–03)	30–21–4–1	L
57	February 12, 2003	3–1	@ Chicago Blackhawks (2002–03)	31–21–4–1	W
58	February 15, 2003	2–1	Ottawa Senators (2002–03)	32–21–4–1	W
59	February 18, 2003	4–3	Carolina Hurricanes (2002–03)	33–21–4–1	W
60	February 20, 2003	6–2	@ Washington Capitals (2002–03)	34–21–4–1	W
61	February 22, 2003	5–3	@ Montreal Canadiens (2002–03)	35–21–4–1	W
62	February 23, 2003	2–5	Nashville Predators (2002–03)	35–22–4–1	L
63	February 25, 2003	5–2	New York Islanders (2002–03)	36–22–4–1	W
64	February 27, 2003	2–7	@ Detroit Red Wings (2002–03)	36–23–4–1	L

March: 6–4–3–2 (home: 3–1–2–0; road: 3–3–1–2)

Game	Date	Score	Opponent	Record	Recap
65	March 1, 2003	4–1	Carolina Hurricanes (2002–03)	37–23–4–1	W
66	March 3, 2003	1–2	Florida Panthers (2002–03)	37–24–4–1	L
67	March 4, 2003	1–4	@ Ottawa Senators (2002–03)	37–25–4–1	L
68	March 6, 2003	2–4	@ Buffalo Sabres (2002–03)	37–26–4–1	L
69	March 8, 2003	3–3 OT	Vancouver Canucks (2002–03)	37–26–5–1	T
70	March 10, 2003	3–2	@ Edmonton Oilers (2002–03)	38–26–5–1	W
71	March 13, 2003	3–4 OT	@ Calgary Flames (2002–03)	38–26–5–2	OTL
72	March 15, 2003	1–0	@ Vancouver Canucks (2002–03)	39–26–5–2	W
73	March 18, 2003	3–3 OT	New York Islanders (2002–03)	39–26–6–2	T
74	March 20, 2003	3–4 OT	@ Columbus Blue Jackets (2002–03)	39–26–6–3	OTL
75	March 22, 2003	3–2 OT	Buffalo Sabres (2002–03)	40–26–6–3	W
76	March 24, 2003	2–3	@ Boston Bruins (2002–03)	40–27–6–3	L
77	March 25, 2003	3–3 OT	@ Carolina Hurricanes (2002–03)	40–27–7–3	T
78	March 28, 2003	5–2	@ New York Islanders (2002–03)	41–27–7–3	W
79	March 29, 2003	4–3 OT	Washington Capitals (2002–03)	42–27–7–3	W

April: 2–1–0–0 (home: 1–1–0–0; road: 1–0–0–0)

Game	Date	Score	Opponent	Record	Recap
80	April 1, 2003	3–2 OT	@ New Jersey Devils (2002–03)	43–27–7–3	W
81	April 3, 2003	2–1	Minnesota Wild (2002–03)	44–27–7–3	W
82	April 5, 2003	1–3	Ottawa Senators (2002–03)	44–28–7–3	L

Legend: W Win (2 points) L Loss (0 points) T Tie (1 point) OTL Overtime loss (1 point)

- † Hockey Hall of Fame Game

=== Playoffs ===
2003 Stanley Cup playoffs
Eastern Conference Quarterfinals vs. (4) Philadelphia Flyers – Flyers win 4–3

Game	Date	Score	Opponent	Attendance	Series	Recap
1	April 9, 2003	5–3	@ Philadelphia Flyers	18,937	Maple Leafs lead 1–0	W
2	April 11, 2003	1–4	@ Philadelphia Flyers	19,597	Series tied 1–1	L
3	April 14, 2003	4–3 2OT	Philadelphia Flyers	19,533	Maple Leafs lead 2–1	W
4	April 16, 2003	2–3 3OT	Philadelphia Flyers	19,574	Series tied 2–2	L
5	April 19, 2003	1–4	@ Philadelphia Flyers	19,828	Flyers lead 3–2	L
6	April 21, 2003	2–1 2OT	Philadelphia Flyers	19,573	Series tied 3–3	W
7	April 22, 2003	1–6	@ Philadelphia Flyers	19,870	Flyers win 4–3	L

Legend: W Win L Loss

== Player statistics ==
=== Scoring ===
- Position abbreviations: C = Centre; D = Defence; G = Goaltender; LW = Left wing; RW = Right wing
- † = Joined team via a transaction (e.g., trade, waivers, signing) during the season. Stats reflect time with the Maple Leafs only.
- ‡ = Left team via a transaction (e.g., trade, waivers, release) during the season. Stats reflect time with the Maple Leafs only.

No.	Player	Pos	Regular season						Playoffs					
No.	Player	Pos	GP	G	A	Pts	+/-	PIM	GP	G	A	Pts	+/-	PIM
89	Alexander Mogilny	RW	73	33	46	79	4	12	6	5	2	7	2	4
13	Mats Sundin	C	75	37	35	72	1	58	7	1	3	4	−1	6
15	Tomáš Kaberle	D	82	11	36	47	20	30	7	2	1	3	−6	0
80 (Note: Antropov wore number 11 through March 6 and switched numbers when Nolan was acquired.)	Nik Antropov	RW	72	16	29	45	11	124	3	0	0	0	−3	0
67	Róbert Švehla	D	82	7	38	45	13	46	7	0	3	3	−5	2
21	Robert Reichel	C	81	12	30	42	7	26	7	2	1	3	−4	0
16	Darcy Tucker	LW	77	10	26	36	−7	119	6	0	3	3	1	6
19	Mikael Renberg	RW	67	14	21	35	5	36	7	1	0	1	−4	8
14	Jonas Höglund	LW	79	13	19	32	2	12	7	0	1	1	−1	0
28	Tie Domi	RW	79	15	14	29	−1	171	7	1	0	1	0	13
39	Travis Green	C	75	12	12	24	2	67	4	2	1	3	3	4
24	Bryan McCabe	D	75	6	18	24	9	135	7	0	3	3	−3	10
25	Jyrki Lumme	D	73	6	11	17	10	46	7	0	2	2	4	4
12	Tom Fitzgerald	LW	66	4	13	17	10	57	7	0	1	1	−2	4
27	Shayne Corson‡	LW	46	7	8	15	−5	49	2	0	0	0	−2	2
18	Alyn McCauley‡	C	64	6	9	15	3	16	—	—	—	—	—	—
11	Owen Nolan†	RW	14	7	5	12	2	16	7	0	2	2	−4	2
8	Aki Berg	D	78	4	7	11	3	28	7	1	1	2	1	2
26	Paul Healey	LW	44	3	7	10	8	16	4	0	1	1	1	2
2	Wade Belak	D	55	3	6	9	−2	196	2	0	0	0	−2	4
7	Gary Roberts	LW	14	5	3	8	−2	10	7	1	1	2	−4	8
29	Karel Pilař	D	17	3	4	7	−7	12	—	—	—	—	—	—
23 (Note: Ponikarovsky wore number 22 in his first seven games and switched numbers when Wesley was acquired.)	Alexei Ponikarovsky	LW	13	0	3	3	4	11	—	—	—	—	—	—
22	Glen Wesley†	D	7	0	3	3	3	4	5	0	1	1	0	2
20	Ed Belfour	G	62	0	2	2		24	7	0	0	0		4
23	Harold Druken†‡	C	5	0	2	2	1	2	—	—	—	—	—	—
55	Ric Jackman	D	42	0	2	2	−10	41	—	—	—	—	—	—
9	Josh Holden	C	5	1	0	1	−2	2	—	—	—	—	—	—
41	Matt Stajan	C	1	1	0	1	1	0	—	—	—	—	—	—
45	Carlo Colaiacovo	D	2	0	1	1	0	0	—	—	—	—	—	—
10	Aaron Gavey	C	5	0	1	1	1	0	—	—	—	—	—	—
44	Anders Eriksson	D	4	0	0	0	1	0	—	—	—	—	—	—
93	Doug Gilmour†	C	1	0	0	0	0	0	—	—	—	—	—	—
96	Phil Housley†	D	1	0	0	0	−1	2	3	0	0	0	−3	0
37	Trevor Kidd	G	19	0	0	0		0	—	—	—	—	—	—
32	Mikael Tellqvist	G	3	0	0	0		0	—	—	—	—	—	—

=== Goaltending ===
No.	Player	Regular season										Playoffs								
No.	Player	GP	W	L	T	SA	GA	GAA	SV%	SO	TOI	GP	W	L	SA	GA	GAA	SV%	SO	TOI
20	Ed Belfour	62	37	20	5	1816	141	2.26	.922	7	3738	7	3	4	282	24	2.71	.915	0	532
37	Trevor Kidd	19	6	10	2	565	59	3.10	.896	0	1143	—	—	—	—	—	—	—	—	—
32	Mikael Tellqvist	3	1	1	0	38	4	2.79	.895	0	86	—	—	—	—	—	—	—	—	—

== Awards and records ==
=== Awards ===
Type	Award/honour	Recipient	Ref
League (annual)	Lady Byng Trophy	Alexander Mogilny	
League (in-season)	NHL All-Star Game selection	Ed Belfour (Note: Belfour did not play and was replaced by Patrick Lalime of the Ottawa Senators.)	
League (in-season)	NHL All-Star Game selection	Mats Sundin (Note: Sundin did not play and was replaced by Miroslav Šatan of the Buffalo Sabres.)	
League (in-season)	NHL Player of the Week	Ed Belfour (November 25)	
Team	Molson Cup	Ed Belfour	

=== Milestones ===
Milestone	Player	Date	Ref
400th goal	Mats Sundin	October 14, 2002	
First game	Carlo Colaiacovo	October 23, 2002	
First game	Mikael Tellqvist	January 18, 2003	
First game	Matt Stajan	April 5, 2003	
1,000th point	Mats Sundin	March 10, 2003	
1,000th game played	Mats Sundin	March 24, 2003	
400th win	Ed Belfour	April 1, 2003	

== Transactions ==
The Maple Leafs were involved in the following transactions from June 14, 2002, the day after the deciding game of the 2002 Stanley Cup Finals, through June 9, 2003, the day of the deciding game of the 2003 Stanley Cup Finals.

=== Trades ===
Date	Details		Ref
June 22, 2002	To Calgary Flames: 3rd-round pick in 2002; 5th-round pick in 2002	To Toronto Maple Leafs: 3rd-round pick in 2002	
June 22, 2002	To Nashville Predators: 3rd-round pick in 2003	To Toronto Maple Leafs: 3rd-round pick in 2002	
June 23, 2002	To Vancouver Canucks: Jeff Farkas	To Toronto Maple Leafs: Josh Holden	
June 25, 2002	To Vancouver Canucks: Future considerations (Note: 8th-round pick in 2003)	To Toronto Maple Leafs: Ryan Bonni	
June 30, 2002	To Calgary Flames: Rights to Curtis Joseph	To Toronto Maple Leafs: Conditional 8th-round pick in 2003	
June 30, 2002	To Nashville Predators: Rights to Tie Domi	To Toronto Maple Leafs: 8th-round pick in 2003	
July 18, 2002	To Florida Panthers: Rights to Dmitri Yushkevich	To Toronto Maple Leafs: Rights to Robert Svehla	
September 4, 2002	To Vancouver Canucks: Tomas Mojzis	To Toronto Maple Leafs: Brad Leeb	
December 31, 2002	To Nashville Predators: Bob Wren	To Toronto Maple Leafs: Nathan Perrott	
March 5, 2003	To San Jose Sharks: Brad Boyes; Alyn McCauley; 1st-round pick in 2003	To Toronto Maple Leafs: Owen Nolan	
March 9, 2003	To Carolina Hurricanes: 2nd-round pick in 2004	To Toronto Maple Leafs: Glen Wesley	
March 11, 2003	To Montreal Canadiens: 6th-round pick in 2003	To Toronto Maple Leafs: Doug Gilmour	
March 11, 2003	To Chicago Blackhawks: Future considerations (Note: Chicago would receive either a 4th-round pick in 2003 or a 9th-round pick in 2003 and a 4th-round pick in 2004.)	To Toronto Maple Leafs: Phil Housley	
May 29, 2003	To Carolina Hurricanes: Allan Rourke	To Toronto Maple Leafs: Harold Druken	

=== Players acquired ===
Date	Player	Former team	Term	Via	Ref
July 2, 2002	Ed Belfour	Nashville Predators	2-year	Free agency	
July 12, 2002	Tie Domi	Nashville Predators	3-year	Free agency	
July 17, 2002	Tom Fitzgerald	Chicago Blackhawks		Free agency	
July 24, 2002	Aaron Gavey	Minnesota Wild	multi-year	Free agency	
July 31, 2002	Nathan Barrett	Lethbridge Hurricanes (WHL)	multi-year	Free agency	
August 26, 2002	Trevor Kidd	Florida Panthers	2-year	Free agency	
September 18, 2002	Tyson Marsh	Vancouver Giants (WHL)		Free agency	
December 11, 2002	Harold Druken	Carolina Hurricanes		Waivers	

=== Players lost ===
Date	Player	New team	Via (Note: In parentheses is the player's free agency group on July 1 if applicable.)	Ref
July 8, 2002	Corey Schwab	New Jersey Devils	Free agency (III)	
July 12, 2002	Nathan Dempsey	Chicago Blackhawks	Free agency (VI)	
July 17, 2002	Donald MacLean	Columbus Blue Jackets	Free agency (VI)	
October 9, 2002	Garry Valk	Chicago Blackhawks	Free agency (III)	
November 4, 2002	Tom Barrasso	St. Louis Blues	Free agency (III)	
December 17, 2002	Cory Cross	New York Rangers	Free agency (III)	
January 17, 2003	Harold Druken	Carolina Hurricanes	Waivers	
April 15, 2003	Shayne Corson		Retirement	

=== Signings ===
Date	Player	Term	Contract type	Ref
July 14, 2002	Ric Jackman		Re-signing	
July 16, 2002	Wade Belak		Re-signing	
July 16, 2002	Alyn McCauley		Re-signing	
July 17, 2002	Jonas Höglund	1-year	Re-signing	
July 18, 2002	Róbert Švehla	1-year (Note: Svehla agreed to a series of one-year contracts.)	Re-signing	
July 24, 2002	Marc Moro	multi-year	Re-signing	
July 29, 2002	Aki Berg	multi-year	Re-signing	
September 16, 2002	Dmytro Yakushyn		Re-signing	
September 18, 2002	Nik Antropov		Re-signing	
September 18, 2002	Ryan Bonni		Re-signing	
September 18, 2002	Josh Holden		Re-signing	
September 18, 2002	Brad Leeb		Re-signing	
October 7, 2002	Carlo Colaiacovo	multi-year	Entry-level	
February 18, 2003	Gary Roberts	1-year	Extension	
March 25, 2003	Brendan Bell	multi-year	Entry-level	
April 3, 2003	Matt Stajan	3-year	Entry-level	
April 8, 2003	David Turoň	multi-year	Entry-level	
May 7, 2003	Kyle Wellwood		Entry-level	
May 29, 2003	Pierre Hedin	multi-year	Entry-level	
June 9, 2003	Ian White		Entry-level	

== Draft picks ==
Toronto's draft picks at the 2002 NHL entry draft held at the Air Canada Centre in Toronto, Ontario.

Round	#	Player	Nationality	College/Junior/Club team (League)
1	24	Alexander Steen	Sweden	Frölunda HC (Sweden)
2	57	Matt Stajan	Canada	Belleville Bulls (OHL)
3	74	Todd Ford	Canada	Swift Current Broncos (WHL)
3	88	Dominic D'Amour	Canada	Hull Olympiques (QMJHL)
4	122	David Turoň	Czech Republic	Femax Havířov (Czech Republic)
6	191	Ian White	Canada	Swift Current Broncos (WHL)
7	222	Scott May	Canada	Ohio State University (CCHA)
8	254	Jarkko Immonen	Finland	JYP (Finland)
9	285	Staffan Kronwall	Sweden	Huddinge IK (Sweden)

== See also ==
- 2002–03 NHL season
