= 2002–03 Atlanta Thrashers season =

National Hockey League team season

2002–03 Atlanta Thrashers
- Division: 3rd Southeast
- Conference: 11th Eastern
- 2002–03 record: 31–39–7–5
- Home record: 15–19–4–3
- Road record: 16–20–3–2
- Goals for: 226
- Goals against: 284

Team information
- General manager: Don Waddell
- Coach: Curt Fraser (Oct-Dec); Don Waddell (Dec-Jan); Bob Hartley (Jan-Apr)
- Captain: Rotating (Oct-Jan); Shawn McEachern (Jan-Apr)
- Alternate captains: Dany Heatley (Jan-Apr); Tony Hrkac (Jan-Apr); Vyacheslav Kozlov (Jan-Apr); Jeff Odgers (Jan-Apr)
- Arena: Philips Arena
- Average attendance: 13,476
- Minor league affiliates: Chicago Wolves; Greenville Grrrowl

Team leaders
- Goals: Dany Heatley (41)
- Assists: Vyacheslav Kozlov (49)
- Points: Dany Heatley (89)
- Penalty minutes: Jeff Odgers (171)
- Plus/minus: Lubos Bartecko (+3)
- Wins: Pasi Nurminen (21)
- Goals against average: Pasi Nurminen (2.88)

The 2002–03 Atlanta Thrashers season was the 21st season of play for the National Hockey League franchise that was established on June 22, 1979, and 28th season for the organization overall. The Thrashers placed third in the Southeast, and eleventh in the East to miss the playoffs.

== Offseason ==
The Thrashers initially rotated the team captaincy among four players — Vyacheslav Kozlov, Uwe Krupp, Shawn McEachern, and Jeff Odgers.

== Regular season ==
After a poor start to the season saw the Thrashers with the worst record in the league, head coach Curt Fraser was fired on December 26. Recently fired Colorado Avalanche head coach Bob Hartley was named his replacement on January 15. The rotating captaincy was discontinued two days later when McEachern was named permanent captain.

The Thrashers struggled defensively, allowing the most goals (284) and the most short-handed goals (14) of any team in the league.

=== Final standings ===
Southeast Division
No.	CR		GP	W	L	T	OTL	GF	GA	Pts
1	3	**Tampa Bay Lightning**	82	36	25	16	5	219	210	93
2	6	**Washington Capitals**	82	39	29	8	6	224	220	92
3	11	Atlanta Thrashers	82	31	39	7	5	226	284	74
4	13	Florida Panthers	82	24	36	13	9	176	237	70
5	15	Carolina Hurricanes	82	22	43	11	6	171	240	61

Note: CR = Conference rank; GP = Games played; W = Wins; L = Losses; T = Ties; OTL = Overtime loss; GF = Goals for; GA = Goals against; Pts = Points
Bolded teams qualified for the playoffs.

Eastern Conference
R		Div	GP	W	L	T	OTL	GF	GA	Pts
**1**	**P-** Ottawa Senators	**NE**	**82**	**52**	**21**	**8**	**1**	**263**	**182**	113
**2**	**Y-** New Jersey Devils	**AT**	**82**	**46**	**20**	**10**	**6**	**216**	**166**	108
**3**	**Y-** Tampa Bay Lightning	**SE**	**82**	**36**	**25**	**16**	**5**	**219**	**210**	93
**4**	**X-** Philadelphia Flyers	**AT**	**82**	**45**	**20**	**13**	**4**	**211**	**166**	107
**5**	**X-** Toronto Maple Leafs	**NE**	**82**	**44**	**28**	**7**	**3**	**236**	**208**	98
**6**	**X-** Washington Capitals	**SE**	**82**	**39**	**29**	**8**	**6**	**224**	**220**	92
**7**	**X-** Boston Bruins	**NE**	**82**	**36**	**31**	**11**	**4**	**245**	**237**	87
**8**	**X-** New York Islanders	**AT**	**82**	**35**	**34**	**11**	**2**	**224**	**231**	83
8.5
9	New York Rangers	AT	82	32	36	10	4	210	231	78
10	Montreal Canadiens	NE	82	30	35	8	9	206	234	77
11	Atlanta Thrashers	SE	82	31	39	7	5	226	284	74
12	Buffalo Sabres	NE	82	27	37	10	8	190	219	72
13	Florida Panthers	SE	82	24	36	13	9	176	237	70
14	Pittsburgh Penguins	AT	82	27	44	6	5	189	255	65
15	Carolina Hurricanes	SE	82	22	43	11	6	171	240	61

Divisions: AT – Atlantic, NE – Northeast, SE – Southeast

P – Clinched Presidents Trophy; Y – Clinched division; X – Clinched playoff spot

== Schedule and results ==
2002–03 regular season
October: 0–8–1–1 (home: 0–3–0–1; road: 0–5–1–0)

Game	Date	Score	Opponent	Record	Recap
1	October 11, 2002	3–5	@ Carolina Hurricanes (2002–03)	0–1–0–0	L
2	October 12, 2002	4–5 OT	Florida Panthers (2002–03)	0–1–0–1	OTL
3	October 16, 2002	2–3	@ Pittsburgh Penguins (2002–03)	0–2–0–1	L
4	October 18, 2002	5–8	@ Tampa Bay Lightning (2002–03)	0–3–0–1	L
5	October 19, 2002	4–5	New York Islanders (2002–03)	0–4–0–1	L
6	October 21, 2002	2–3	@ Florida Panthers (2002–03)	0–5–0–1	L
7	October 23, 2002	1–2	New Jersey Devils (2002–03)	0–6–0–1	L
8	October 26, 2002	3–4	@ Boston Bruins (2002–03)	0–7–0–1	L
9	October 29, 2002	0–4	Los Angeles Kings (2002–03)	0–8–0–1	L
10	October 31, 2002	3–3 OT	@ Toronto Maple Leafs (2002–03)	0–8–1–1	T

November: 6–6–0–0 (home: 4–3–0–0; road: 2–3–0–0)

Game	Date	Score	Opponent	Record	Recap
11	November 2, 2002	3–1	@ Florida Panthers (2002–03)	1–8–1–1	W
12	November 7, 2002	0–5	@ Chicago Blackhawks (2002–03)	1–9–1–1	L
13	November 9, 2002	6–4	@ Buffalo Sabres (2002–03)	2–9–1–1	W
14	November 11, 2002	2–1	Calgary Flames (2002–03)	3–9–1–1	W
15	November 13, 2002	3–2 OT	San Jose Sharks (2002–03)	4–9–1–1	W
16	November 15, 2002	1–5	Phoenix Coyotes (2002–03)	4–10–1–1	L
17	November 17, 2002	1–5	Mighty Ducks of Anaheim (2002–03)	4–11–1–1	L
18	November 19, 2002	4–3 OT	Florida Panthers (2002–03)	5–11–1–1	W
19	November 22, 2002	1–3	Pittsburgh Penguins (2002–03)	5–12–1–1	L
20	November 23, 2002	3–6	@ Washington Capitals (2002–03)	5–13–1–1	L
21	November 26, 2002	2–3	@ Montreal Canadiens (2002–03)	5–14–1–1	L
22	November 28, 2002	7–4	New York Rangers (2002–03)	6–14–1–1	W

December: 4–7–0–3 (home: 2–3–0–1; road: 2–4–0–2)

Game	Date	Score	Opponent	Record	Recap
23	December 1, 2002	5–4	Washington Capitals (2002–03)	7–14–1–1	W
24	December 5, 2002	3–4 OT	@ Boston Bruins (2002–03)	7–14–1–2	OTL
25	December 6, 2002	6–7 OT	@ Washington Capitals (2002–03)	7–14–1–3	OTL
26	December 8, 2002	0–3	Edmonton Oilers (2002–03)	7–15–1–3	L
27	December 11, 2002	2–4	@ Phoenix Coyotes (2002–03)	7–16–1–3	L
28	December 13, 2002	1–3	@ Dallas Stars (2002–03)	7–17–1–3	L
29	December 14, 2002	0–4	@ St. Louis Blues (2002–03)	7–18–1–3	L
30	December 16, 2002	1–0	Toronto Maple Leafs (2002–03)	8–18–1–3	W
31	December 18, 2002	1–3	Philadelphia Flyers (2002–03)	8–19–1–3	L
32	December 20, 2002	2–3 OT	Carolina Hurricanes (2002–03)	8–19–1–4	OTL
33	December 23, 2002	1–5	@ Toronto Maple Leafs (2002–03)	8–20–1–4	L
34	December 27, 2002	5–3	@ Carolina Hurricanes (2002–03)	9–20–1–4	W
35	December 28, 2002	0–1	Boston Bruins (2002–03)	9–21–1–4	L
36	December 30, 2002	3–2 OT	@ Pittsburgh Penguins (2002–03)	10–21–1–4	W

January: 7–6–2–0 (home: 4–4–2–0; road: 3–2–0–0)

Game	Date	Score	Opponent	Record	Recap
37	January 2, 2003	1–8	@ Ottawa Senators (2002–03)	10–22–1–4	L
38	January 3, 2003	1–4	Pittsburgh Penguins (2002–03)	10–23–1–4	L
39	January 5, 2003	4–5	Philadelphia Flyers (2002–03)	10–24–1–4	L
40	January 7, 2003	3–3 OT	Carolina Hurricanes (2002–03)	10–24–2–4	T
41	January 9, 2003	3–2 OT	@ Tampa Bay Lightning (2002–03)	11–24–2–4	W
42	January 11, 2003	3–7	@ New York Islanders (2002–03)	11–25–2–4	L
43	January 13, 2003	7–4	@ Philadelphia Flyers (2002–03)	12–25–2–4	W
44	January 15, 2003	1–0	Montreal Canadiens (2002–03)	13–25–2–4	W
45	January 17, 2003	3–1	Boston Bruins (2002–03)	14–25–2–4	W
46	January 19, 2003	1–4	New York Islanders (2002–03)	14–26–2–4	L
47	January 21, 2003	8–4	St. Louis Blues (2002–03)	15–26–2–4	W
48	January 23, 2003	3–3 OT	Ottawa Senators (2002–03)	15–26–3–4	T
49	January 25, 2003	4–1	@ New York Rangers (2002–03)	16–26–3–4	W
50	January 28, 2003	5–2	New York Rangers (2002–03)	17–26–3–4	W
51	January 30, 2003	2–5	Toronto Maple Leafs (2002–03)	17–27–3–4	L

February: 4–5–2–0 (home: 1–2–1–0; road: 3–3–1–0)

Game	Date	Score	Opponent	Record	Recap
52	February 4, 2003	4–3	@ Montreal Canadiens (2002–03)	18–27–3–4	W
53	February 7, 2003	4–2	@ New Jersey Devils (2002–03)	19–27–3–4	W
54	February 8, 2003	1–3	@ Ottawa Senators (2002–03)	19–28–3–4	L
55	February 12, 2003	1–5	Washington Capitals (2002–03)	19–29–3–4	L
56	February 14, 2003	2–2 OT	Tampa Bay Lightning (2002–03)	19–29–4–4	T
57	February 15, 2003	2–6	Detroit Red Wings (2002–03)	19–30–4–4	L
58	February 17, 2003	4–3 OT	Buffalo Sabres (2002–03)	20–30–4–4	W
59	February 19, 2003	0–2	@ Tampa Bay Lightning (2002–03)	20–31–4–4	L
60	February 23, 2003	3–3 OT	@ Edmonton Oilers (2002–03)	20–31–5–4	T
61	February 25, 2003	0–8	@ Vancouver Canucks (2002–03)	20–32–5–4	L
62	February 27, 2003	4–3 OT	@ Colorado Avalanche (2002–03)	21–32–5–4	W

March: 8–6–2–1 (home: 3–4–1–1; road: 5–2–1–0)

Game	Date	Score	Opponent	Record	Recap
63	March 1, 2003	1–4	@ Los Angeles Kings (2002–03)	21–33–5–4	L
64	March 2, 2003	4–1	@ Mighty Ducks of Anaheim (2002–03)	22–33–5–4	W
65	March 6, 2003	4–4 OT	@ Washington Capitals (2002–03)	22–33–6–4	T
66	March 7, 2003	1–2	Florida Panthers (2002–03)	22–34–6–4	L
67	March 9, 2003	4–6	Minnesota Wild (2002–03)	22–35–6–4	L
68	March 11, 2003	3–2	@ New Jersey Devils (2002–03)	23–35–6–4	W
69	March 13, 2003	2–4	Montreal Canadiens (2002–03)	23–36–6–4	L
70	March 15, 2003	5–3	Buffalo Sabres (2002–03)	24–36–6–4	W
71	March 17, 2003	3–2	Columbus Blue Jackets (2002–03)	25–36–6–4	W
72	March 19, 2003	4–5 OT	Dallas Stars (2002–03)	25–36–6–5	OTL
73	March 21, 2003	1–5	Ottawa Senators (2002–03)	25–37–6–5	L
74	March 22, 2003	3–2	@ Columbus Blue Jackets (2002–03)	26–37–6–5	W
75	March 24, 2003	2–6	@ Philadelphia Flyers (2002–03)	26–38–6–5	L
76	March 26, 2003	5–1	Carolina Hurricanes (2002–03)	27–38–6–5	W
77	March 28, 2003	1–1 OT	New Jersey Devils (2002–03)	27–38–7–5	T
78	March 29, 2003	3–2	@ Nashville Predators (2002–03)	28–38–7–5	W
79	March 31, 2003	4–3 OT	@ New York Rangers (2002–03)	29–38–7–5	W

April: 2–1–0–0 (home: 1–0–0–0; road: 1–1–0–0)

Game	Date	Score	Opponent	Record	Recap
80	April 2, 2003	3–4	@ Buffalo Sabres (2002–03)	29–39–7–5	L
81	April 5, 2003	3–2	@ New York Islanders (2002–03)	30–39–7–5	W
82	April 6, 2003	6–2	Tampa Bay Lightning (2002–03)	31–39–7–5	W

Legend: W Win (2 points) L Loss (0 points) T Tie (1 point) OTL Overtime loss (1 point)

== Player statistics ==
=== Scoring ===
- Position abbreviations: C = Center; D = Defense; G = Goaltender; LW = Left wing; RW = Right wing
- † = Joined team via a transaction (e.g., trade, waivers, signing) during the season. Stats reflect time with the Thrashers only.
- ‡ = Left team via a transaction (e.g., trade, waivers, release) during the season. Stats reflect time with the Thrashers only.

No.	Player	Pos	Regular season					
No.	Player	Pos	GP	G	A	Pts	+/-	PIM
15	Dany Heatley	LW	77	41	48	89	−8	58
13	Vyacheslav Kozlov	LW	79	21	49	70	−10	66
17	Ilya Kovalchuk	LW	81	38	29	67	−24	57
9	Marc Savard†	C	57	16	31	47	−11	77
27	Patrik Stefan	C	71	13	21	34	−10	12
38	Yannick Tremblay	D	75	8	22	30	−27	32
19	Shawn McEachern	RW	46	10	16	26	−27	28
12	Tony Hrkac	C	80	9	17	26	−16	14
8	Frantisek Kaberle	D	79	7	19	26	−19	32
25	Andy Sutton	D	53	3	18	21	−8	114
23	Lubos Bartecko	LW	37	7	9	16	3	8
36	Daniel Tjarnqvist	D	75	3	12	15	−20	26
37	Dan Snyder	C	36	10	4	14	−4	34
18	Brad Tapper	RW	35	10	4	14	2	23
26	Pascal Rheaume‡	C	56	4	9	13	−8	24
42	Richard Smehlik‡	D	43	2	9	11	−4	16
4	Chris Tamer	D	72	1	9	10	−10	118
16	Jeff Cowan	LW	66	3	5	8	−15	115
39	Per Svartvadet	C	62	1	7	8	−11	8
3	Mark Hartigan	C	23	5	2	7	−8	6
20	Jeff Odgers	RW	74	2	4	6	−13	171
7	Chris Herperger‡	C	27	4	1	5	−11	7
22	Kamil Piros	C	3	3	2	5	4	2
43	Mike Weaver	D	40	0	5	5	−5	20
29	Kirill Safronov	D	32	2	2	4	−10	14
31	Pasi Nurminen	G	52	0	3	3		4
10	Yuri Butsayev	LW	16	2	0	2	−5	8
50	Joe DiPenta	D	3	1	1	2	3	0
2	Garnet Exelby	D	15	0	2	2	0	41
14	Tomi Kallio‡	LW	5	0	2	2	−2	4
6	Francis Lessard	RW	18	0	2	2	1	61
45	Ben Simon	LW	10	0	1	1	0	9
49	Zdenek Blatny	LW	4	0	0	0	−1	0
35	Frederic Cassivi	G	2	0	0	0		0
34	Byron Dafoe†	G	17	0	0	0		0
28	Jeff Farkas†	RW	3	0	0	0	−1	0
47	Kurtis Foster	D	2	0	0	0	−2	0
41	Simon Gamache	C	2	0	0	0	−1	2
33	Milan Hnilicka	G	21	0	0	0		2
44	Uwe Krupp	D	4	0	0	0	−2	10
11	J. P. Vigier	RW	13	0	0	0	−13	4

=== Goaltending ===
- † = Joined team via a transaction (e.g., trade, waivers, signing) during the season. Stats reflect time with the Thrashers only.

No.	Player	Regular season									
No.	Player	GP	W	L	T	SA	GA	GAA	SV%	SO	TOI
31	Pasi Nurminen	52	21	19	5	1452	137	2.88	.906	2	2856
34	Byron Dafoe†	17	5	11	1	472	65	4.36	.862	0	895
33	Milan Hnilicka	21	4	13	1	605	65	3.56	.893	0	1097
35	Frederic Cassivi	2	1	1	0	58	11	5.37	.810	0	123

== Awards and records ==
=== Awards ===
Type	Award/honor	Recipient	Ref
League (in-season)	NHL All-Star Game selection	Dany Heatley (Note: Heatley was voted the All-Star Game MVP.)	
League (in-season)	NHL Player of the Week	Dany Heatley (March 31)	
Team	Community Service Award	Chris Tamer	
Team	Players' Player Award	Jeff Odgers	
Team	Team MVP	Dany Heatley	
Team	Three Stars of the Game Award	Dany Heatley	

=== Milestones ===
Milestone	Player	Date	Ref
First game	Simon Gamache	March 7, 2003	
First game	Garnet Exelby	March 11, 2003	
First game	Zdenek Blatny	March 19, 2003	
First game	Kurtis Foster	March 31, 2003	
First game	Joe DiPenta	April 2, 2003	

== Transactions ==
The Thrashers were involved in the following transactions from June 14, 2002, the day after the deciding game of the 2002 Stanley Cup Final, through June 9, 2003, the day of the deciding game of the 2003 Stanley Cup Final.

=== Trades ===
Date	Details		Ref
June 22, 2002	To Atlanta Thrashers: Vancouver’s 3rd-round pick in 2002; NY Rangers’ 4th-round pick in 2003	To Florida Panthers: Future considerations (Note: The Thrashers promised not to pick defenseman Jay Bouwmeester with the second overall selection in the draft.)	
June 22, 2002	To Atlanta Thrashers: Vyacheslav Kozlov; 2nd-round pick in 2002	To Buffalo Sabres: 2nd-round pick in 2002; Vancouver’s 3rd-round pick in 2002	
June 22, 2002	To Atlanta Thrashers: Detroit’s 1st-round pick in 2002	To Columbus Blue Jackets: Buffalo’s 2nd-round pick in 2002; Detroit’s 3rd-round pick in 2002	
June 23, 2002	To Atlanta Thrashers: 8th-round pick in 2002; 7th-round pick in 2003	To San Jose Sharks: New Jersey’s 7th-round pick in 2002	
June 29, 2002	To Atlanta Thrashers: Shawn McEachern; 6th-round pick in 2004	To Ottawa Senators: Brian Pothier	
October 4, 2002	To Atlanta Thrashers: Future considerations (Note: 6th-round pick in 2003)	To Dallas Stars: Stephane Robidas	
November 15, 2002	To Atlanta Thrashers: Marc Savard	To Calgary Flames: Rights to Ruslan Zainullin	
December 2, 2002	To Atlanta Thrashers: Chris Nielsen; Petteri Nummelin	To Columbus Blue Jackets: Tomi Kallio; Pauli Levokari	
January 20, 2003	To Atlanta Thrashers: Jeff Farkas	To Vancouver Canucks: Chris Herperger; Chris Nielsen	
February 24, 2003	To Atlanta Thrashers: Conditional draft pick in 2004	To New Jersey Devils: Pascal Rheaume	
March 10, 2003	To Atlanta Thrashers: 4th-round pick in 2003	To New Jersey Devils: Richard Smehlik; Conditional draft pick in 2004	
March 11, 2003	To Atlanta Thrashers: Rights to Anthony Aquino	To Dallas Stars: Dallas’ 6th-round pick in 2003; Future considerations	

=== Players acquired ===
Date	Player	Former team	Term	Via	Ref
July 10, 2002	Richard Smehlik	Buffalo Sabres		Free agency	
July 19, 2002	Uwe Krupp	Detroit Red Wings		Free agency	
July 23, 2002	Dallas Eakins	Calgary Flames		Free agency	
August 1, 2002	Chris Herperger	Ottawa Senators		Free agency	
October 4, 2002	Stephane Robidas	Montreal Canadiens		Waiver draft	
November 22, 2002	Byron Dafoe	Boston Bruins		Free agency	
March 28, 2003	Brian Maloney	Michigan State University (CCHA)		Free agency	

=== Players lost ===
Date	Player	New team	Via (Note: In parentheses is the player's free agency group on July 1 if applicable.)	Ref
July 1, 2002	Damian Rhodes		Buyout (Note: The buyout was later cancelled with Atlanta being held liable for Rhodes’ full 2002–03 salary since Rhodes was unable to pass a physical with another NHL team. Atlanta first loaned Rhodes to the AHL’s Lowell Lock Monsters and later in the season re-assigned him to the ECHL’s Greenville Grrrowl.)	
July 17, 2002	Todd Reirden	Anaheim Mighty Ducks	Free agency (UFA)	
August 5, 2002	Bryan Adams	Detroit Red Wings	Free agency (VI)	
August 21, 2002	Scott Fankhouser	Reading Royals (ECHL)	Free agency (VI)	
August 30, 2002	Adam Burt		Retirement (III)	
N/A	Jeff Dessner	Iserlohn Roosters (DEL)	Free agency (UFA)	
April 27, 2003	Uwe Krupp		Retirement	
June 8, 2003	Norm Maracle	Metallurg Magnitogorsk (RSL)	Free agency	

=== Signings ===
Date	Player	Term	Contract type	Ref
June 27, 2002	Jeff Cowan		Re-signing	
June 27, 2002	Andy Sutton		Re-signing	
July 11, 2002	Pauli Levokari		Entry-level	
July 18, 2002	Pascal Rheaume		Re-signing	
July 18, 2002	Brad Tapper		Re-signing	
July 18, 2002	Mike Weaver		Re-signing	
July 23, 2002	Paul Flache		Entry-level	
July 23, 2002	Michael Garnett		Entry-level	
July 25, 2002	Patrik Stefan	2-year	Re-signing	
August 1, 2002	Tomi Kallio		Re-signing	
August 1, 2002	Vyacheslav Kozlov	1-year	Re-signing	
August 1, 2002	Ben Simon		Re-signing	
August 8, 2002	Yannick Tremblay		Re-signing	
August 9, 2002	Mark Hartigan		Re-signing	
August 19, 2002	Francis Lessard		Re-signing	
August 27, 2002	Dan Snyder		Re-signing	
August 27, 2002	Daniel Tjarnqvist		Re-signing	
September 10, 2002	Yuri Butsayev		Re-signing	
September 11, 2002	Milan Hnilicka		Re-signing	
March 11, 2003	Shawn McEachern	multi-year	Extension	
June 4, 2003	Kari Lehtonen		Entry-level	

== Draft picks ==
Atlanta's draft picks at the 2002 NHL entry draft held at the Air Canada Centre in Toronto, Ontario.

Round	#	Player	Nationality	College/Junior/Club team (League)
1	2	Kari Lehtonen	Finland	Jokerit (Finland)
1	30	Jim Slater	United States	Michigan State University (CCHA)
4	116	Patrick Dwyer	United States	Western Michigan University (CCHA)
4	124	Lane Manson	Canada	Moose Jaw Warriors (WHL)
5	144	Paul Flache	Canada	Brampton Battalion (OHL)
6	167	Brad Schell	Canada	Spokane Chiefs (WHL)
7	198	Nathan Oystrick	Canada	Northern Michigan University (CCHA)
8	230	Colton Fretter	Canada	Chatham Maroons (WOHL)
8	236	Tyler Boldt	Canada	Kamloops Blazers (WHL)
8	257	Pauli Levokari	Finland	HIFK (Finland)
