= 2002–03 Washington Capitals season =

NHL hockey team season

2002–03 Washington Capitals
- Division: 2nd Southeast
- Conference: 6th Eastern
- 2002–03 record: 39–29–8–6
- Home record: 24–13–2–2
- Road record: 15–16–6–4
- Goals for: 224
- Goals against: 220

Team information
- General manager: George McPhee
- Coach: Bruce Cassidy
- Captain: Steve Konowalchuk
- Alternate captains: Peter Bondra; Jaromir Jagr; Calle Johansson; Brendan Witt
- Arena: MCI Center
- Average attendance: 15,787
- Minor league affiliates: Portland Pirates; Richmond Renegades

Team leaders
- Goals: Jaromir Jagr (36)
- Assists: Sergei Gonchar (49)
- Points: Jaromir Jagr (77)
- Penalty minutes: Jason Doig (108)
- Plus/minus: Ken Klee (+22)
- Wins: Olaf Kolzig (33)
- Goals against average: Olaf Kolzig (2.40)

The 2002–03 Washington Capitals season was the Washington Capitals 29th season in the National Hockey League (NHL).

== Off-season ==
Head coach Ron Wilson was fired on May 10. The Capitals named Bruce Cassidy their new head coach on June 25. Steve Konowalchuk was named the team’s lone captain while Brendan Witt, who was co-captain of the team in 2001–02 with Konowalchuk, remained one of four alternate captains.

== Regular season ==
The Capitals tied the Detroit Red Wings, Los Angeles Kings and New Jersey Devils for the fewest short-handed goals allowed, with just four.

On January 11, 2003, the Capitals defeated the Florida Panthers at home by a score of 12–2. Jaromir Jagr had seven points in the game (three goals, four assists). It was the first time that an NHL team had scored ten goals in a game since March 30, 2002, when the San Jose Sharks defeated the Columbus Blue Jackets at home by a score of 10–2. Furthermore, it was the first time that the Capitals had scored ten goals in a regular-season game since February 3, 1999, when they defeated the Tampa Bay Lightning at home by a score of 10–1.

=== Final standings ===
Southeast Division
No.	CR		GP	W	L	T	OTL	GF	GA	Pts
1	3	**Tampa Bay Lightning**	82	36	25	16	5	219	210	93
2	6	**Washington Capitals**	82	39	29	8	6	224	220	92
3	11	Atlanta Thrashers	82	31	39	7	5	226	284	74
4	13	Florida Panthers	82	24	36	13	9	176	237	70
5	15	Carolina Hurricanes	82	22	43	11	6	171	240	61

Note: CR = Conference rank; GP = Games played; W = Wins; L = Losses; T = Ties; OTL = Overtime loss; GF = Goals for; GA = Goals against; Pts = Points
Bolded teams qualified for the playoffs.

Eastern Conference
R		Div	GP	W	L	T	OTL	GF	GA	Pts
**1**	**P-** Ottawa Senators	**NE**	**82**	**52**	**21**	**8**	**1**	**263**	**182**	113
**2**	**Y-** New Jersey Devils	**AT**	**82**	**46**	**20**	**10**	**6**	**216**	**166**	108
**3**	**Y-** Tampa Bay Lightning	**SE**	**82**	**36**	**25**	**16**	**5**	**219**	**210**	93
**4**	**X-** Philadelphia Flyers	**AT**	**82**	**45**	**20**	**13**	**4**	**211**	**166**	107
**5**	**X-** Toronto Maple Leafs	**NE**	**82**	**44**	**28**	**7**	**3**	**236**	**208**	98
**6**	**X-** Washington Capitals	**SE**	**82**	**39**	**29**	**8**	**6**	**224**	**220**	92
**7**	**X-** Boston Bruins	**NE**	**82**	**36**	**31**	**11**	**4**	**245**	**237**	87
**8**	**X-** New York Islanders	**AT**	**82**	**35**	**34**	**11**	**2**	**224**	**231**	83
8.5
9	New York Rangers	AT	82	32	36	10	4	210	231	78
10	Montreal Canadiens	NE	82	30	35	8	9	206	234	77
11	Atlanta Thrashers	SE	82	31	39	7	5	226	284	74
12	Buffalo Sabres	NE	82	27	37	10	8	190	219	72
13	Florida Panthers	SE	82	24	36	13	9	176	237	70
14	Pittsburgh Penguins	AT	82	27	44	6	5	189	255	65
15	Carolina Hurricanes	SE	82	22	43	11	6	171	240	61

Divisions: AT – Atlantic, NE – Northeast, SE – Southeast

P – Clinched Presidents Trophy; Y – Clinched division; X – Clinched playoff spot

== Schedule and results ==
=== Regular season ===
2002–03 regular season
October: 4–5–1–0 (home: 1–1–0–0; road: 3–4–1–0)

Game	Date	Score	Opponent	Record	Recap
1	October 11, 2002	5–4	Nashville Predators (2002–03)	1–0–0–0	W
2	October 12, 2002	2–1	@ New York Islanders (2002–03)	2–0–0–0	W
3	October 17, 2002	2–1	@ Carolina Hurricanes (2002–03)	3–0–0–0	W
4	October 19, 2002	1–3	@ Philadelphia Flyers (2002–03)	3–1–0–0	L
5	October 20, 2002	2–5	@ Dallas Stars (2002–03)	3–2–0–0	L
6	October 23, 2002	2–1	@ New York Rangers (2002–03)	4–2–0–0	W
7	October 25, 2002	2–3	@ Tampa Bay Lightning (2002–03)	4–3–0–0	L
8	October 26, 2002	1–1 OT	@ Florida Panthers (2002–03)	4–3–1–0	T
9	October 28, 2002	2–3	@ Pittsburgh Penguins (2002–03)	4–4–1–0	L
10	October 30, 2002	2–7	Boston Bruins (2002–03)	4–5–1–0	L

November: 6–7–1–0 (home: 5–4–0–0; road: 1–3–1–0)

Game	Date	Score	Opponent	Record	Recap
11	November 1, 2002	3–2	Tampa Bay Lightning (2002–03)	5–5–1–0	W
12	November 2, 2002	1–2	@ Philadelphia Flyers (2002–03)	5–6–1–0	L
13	November 5, 2002	4–3 OT	@ Columbus Blue Jackets (2002–03)	6–6–1–0	W
14	November 7, 2002	2–1 OT	Florida Panthers (2002–03)	7–6–1–0	W
15	November 9, 2002	4–1	Philadelphia Flyers (2002–03)	8–6–1–0	W
16	November 13, 2002	1–6	Dallas Stars (2002–03)	8–7–1–0	L
17	November 15, 2002	2–2 OT	@ Chicago Blackhawks (2002–03)	8–7–2–0	T
18	November 16, 2002	0–1	@ Minnesota Wild (2002–03)	8–8–2–0	L
19	November 19, 2002	2–3	San Jose Sharks (2002–03)	8–9–2–0	L
20	November 21, 2002	3–4	Minnesota Wild (2002–03)	8–10–2–0	L
21	November 23, 2002	6–3	Atlanta Thrashers (2002–03)	9–10–2–0	W
22	November 26, 2002	4–5	@ Toronto Maple Leafs (2002–03)	9–11–2–0	L
23	November 27, 2002	4–2	Calgary Flames (2002–03)	10–11–2–0	W
24	November 29, 2002	2–6	Ottawa Senators (2002–03)	10–12–2–0	L

December: 8–4–1–1 (home: 5–0–0–0; road: 3–4–1–1)

Game	Date	Score	Opponent	Record	Recap
25	December 1, 2002	4–5	@ Atlanta Thrashers (2002–03)	10–13–2–0	L
26	December 3, 2002	4–1	@ Pittsburgh Penguins (2002–03)	11–13–2–0	W
27	December 6, 2002	7–6 OT	Atlanta Thrashers (2002–03)	12–13–2–0	W
28	December 7, 2002	3–4	@ Buffalo Sabres (2002–03)	12–14–2–0	L
29	December 11, 2002	0–3	@ Mighty Ducks of Anaheim (2002–03)	12–15–2–0	L
30	December 13, 2002	4–3	@ Phoenix Coyotes (2002–03)	13–15–2–0	W
31	December 14, 2002	0–2	@ San Jose Sharks (2002–03)	13–16–2–0	L
32	December 16, 2002	2–2 OT	@ Colorado Avalanche (2002–03)	13–16–3–0	T
33	December 19, 2002	5–3	Boston Bruins (2002–03)	14–16–3–0	W
34	December 21, 2002	3–1	@ New York Islanders (2002–03)	15–16–3–0	W
35	December 23, 2002	3–0	Tampa Bay Lightning (2002–03)	16–16–3–0	W
36	December 27, 2002	3–2	New Jersey Devils (2002–03)	17–16–3–0	W
37	December 28, 2002	1–2 OT	@ New Jersey Devils (2002–03)	17–16–3–1	OTL
38	December 30, 2002	4–3	Buffalo Sabres (2002–03)	18–16–3–1	W

January: 6–3–4–2 (home: 5–2–1–2; road: 1–1–3–0)

Game	Date	Score	Opponent	Record	Recap
39	January 1, 2003	1–2 OT	Phoenix Coyotes (2002–03)	18–16–3–2	OTL
40	January 3, 2003	2–2 OT	Columbus Blue Jackets (2002–03)	18–16–4–2	T
41	January 4, 2003	2–2 OT	@ New York Rangers (2002–03)	18–16–5–2	T
42	January 10, 2003	4–1	@ Carolina Hurricanes (2002–03)	19–16–5–2	W
43	January 11, 2003	12–2	Florida Panthers (2002–03)	20–16–5–2	W
44	January 13, 2003	4–3 OT	New York Islanders (2002–03)	21–16–5–2	W
45	January 15, 2003	1–2 OT	New York Rangers (2002–03)	21–16–5–3	OTL
46	January 17, 2003	1–4	Toronto Maple Leafs (2002–03)	21–17–5–3	L
47	January 18, 2003	2–5	@ Ottawa Senators (2002–03)	21–18–5–3	L
48	January 20, 2003	3–3 OT	@ Boston Bruins (2002–03)	21–18–6–3	T
49	January 22, 2003	5–3	Carolina Hurricanes (2002–03)	22–18–6–3	W
50	January 25, 2003	1–1 OT	@ Montreal Canadiens (2002–03)	22–18–7–3	T
51	January 26, 2003	7–2	New York Rangers (2002–03)	23–18–7–3	W
52	January 28, 2003	3–5	St. Louis Blues (2002–03)	23–19–7–3	L
53	January 30, 2003	2–1	Pittsburgh Penguins (2002–03)	24–19–7–3	W

February: 6–6–0–0 (home: 3–4–0–0; road: 3–2–0–0)

Game	Date	Score	Opponent	Record	Recap
54	February 4, 2003	5–1	@ Tampa Bay Lightning (2002–03)	25–19–7–3	W
55	February 5, 2003	1–4	New Jersey Devils (2002–03)	25–20–7–3	L
56	February 7, 2003	3–0	New York Islanders (2002–03)	26–20–7–3	W
57	February 9, 2003	0–2	Montreal Canadiens (2002–03)	26–21–7–3	L
58	February 12, 2003	5–1	@ Atlanta Thrashers (2002–03)	27–21–7–3	W
59	February 14, 2003	1–3	@ Carolina Hurricanes (2002–03)	27–22–7–3	L
60	February 15, 2003	2–1	@ Florida Panthers (2002–03)	28–22–7–3	W
61	February 17, 2003	1–3	@ Tampa Bay Lightning (2002–03)	28–23–7–3	L
62	February 20, 2003	2–6	Toronto Maple Leafs (2002–03)	28–24–7–3	L
63	February 22, 2003	1–5	Detroit Red Wings (2002–03)	28–25–7–3	L
64	February 24, 2003	4–1	Montreal Canadiens (2002–03)	29–25–7–3	W
65	February 26, 2003	3–2	Buffalo Sabres (2002–03)	30–25–7–3	W

March: 7–3–1–3 (home: 3–1–1–0; road: 4–2–0–3)

Game	Date	Score	Opponent	Record	Recap
66	March 1, 2003	1–2 OT	@ New Jersey Devils (2002–03)	30–25–7–4	OTL
67	March 2, 2003	2–0	Carolina Hurricanes (2002–03)	31–25–7–4	W
68	March 4, 2003	2–1	@ Buffalo Sabres (2002–03)	32–25–7–4	W
69	March 6, 2003	4–4 OT	Atlanta Thrashers (2002–03)	32–25–8–4	T
70	March 8, 2003	4–5 OT	@ Boston Bruins (2002–03)	32–25–8–5	OTL
71	March 10, 2003	2–1 OT	Philadelphia Flyers (2002–03)	33–25–8–5	W
72	March 14, 2003	1–3	Los Angeles Kings (2002–03)	33–26–8–5	L
73	March 16, 2003	2–1	Colorado Avalanche (2002–03)	34–26–8–5	W
74	March 20, 2003	4–1	@ Calgary Flames (2002–03)	35–26–8–5	W
75	March 22, 2003	3–5	@ Edmonton Oilers (2002–03)	35–27–8–5	L
76	March 23, 2003	0–6	@ Vancouver Canucks (2002–03)	35–28–8–5	L
77	March 25, 2003	4–3 OT	@ Montreal Canadiens (2002–03)	36–28–8–5	W
78	March 28, 2003	3–2	@ Ottawa Senators (2002–03)	37–28–8–5	W
79	March 29, 2003	3–4 OT	@ Toronto Maple Leafs (2002–03)	37–28–8–6	OTL

April: 2–1–0–0 (home: 2–1–0–0; road: 0–0–0–0)

Game	Date	Score	Opponent	Record	Recap
80	April 1, 2003	3–0	Florida Panthers (2002–03)	38–28–8–6	W
81	April 3, 2003	1–5	Ottawa Senators (2002–03)	38–29–8–6	L
82	April 5, 2003	5–3	Pittsburgh Penguins (2002–03)	39–29–8–6	W

Legend: W Win (2 points) L Loss (0 points) T Tie (1 point) OTL Overtime loss (1 point)

=== Playoffs ===
2003 Stanley Cup playoffs
Eastern Conference Quarterfinals vs. Tampa Bay Lightning (3) – Lightning win 4–2

Game	Date	Score	Opponent	Series	Recap
1	April 10, 2003	3–0	@ Tampa Bay Lightning	Capitals lead 1–0	W
2	April 12, 2003	6–3	@ Tampa Bay Lightning	Capitals lead 2–0	W
3	April 15, 2003	3–4 OT	Tampa Bay Lightning	Capitals lead 2–1	L
4	April 16, 2003	1–3	Tampa Bay Lightning	Series tied 2–2	L
5	April 18, 2003	1–2	@ Tampa Bay Lightning	Lightning lead 3–2	L
6	April 20, 2003	1–2 3OT	Tampa Bay Lightning	Lightning win 4–2	L

Legend: W Win L Loss

== Player statistics ==
=== Scoring ===
- Position abbreviations: C = Center; D = Defense; G = Goaltender; LW = Left wing; RW = Right wing
- † = Joined team via a transaction (e.g., trade, waivers, signing) during the season. Stats reflect time with the Capitals only.
- ‡ = Left team via a transaction (e.g., trade, waivers, release) during the season. Stats reflect time with the Capitals only.

No.	Player	Pos	Regular season						Playoffs					
No.	Player	Pos	GP	G	A	Pts	+/-	PIM	GP	G	A	Pts	+/-	PIM
68	Jaromir Jagr	RW	75	36	41	77	5	38	6	2	5	7	2	2
20	Robert Lang	C	82	22	47	69	12	22	6	2	1	3	3	2
55	Sergei Gonchar	D	82	18	49	67	13	52	6	0	5	5	2	4
12	Peter Bondra	RW	76	30	26	56	−3	52	6	4	2	6	2	8
92	Michael Nylander†	C	71	17	39	56	3	36	6	3	2	5	0	8
14	Kip Miller	C	72	12	38	50	−1	18	5	0	2	2	0	2
9	Dainius Zubrus	C	63	13	22	35	15	43	6	2	2	4	−2	4
11	Jeff Halpern	C	82	13	21	34	6	88	6	0	1	1	−2	2
25	Mike Grier	RW	82	15	17	32	−14	36	6	1	1	2	0	2
22	Steve Konowalchuk	LW	77	15	15	30	3	71	6	0	0	0	−3	6
27	Ivan Ciernik	RW	47	8	10	18	6	24	2	0	1	1	1	6
2	Ken Klee	D	70	1	16	17	22	89	6	0	0	0	2	6
6	Calle Johansson	D	82	3	12	15	9	22	6	0	1	1	−4	0
46	Brian Sutherby	C	72	2	9	11	7	93	5	0	0	0	0	10
19	Brendan Witt	D	69	2	9	11	12	106	6	1	0	1	−1	0
94	Sergei Berezin†	LW	9	5	4	9	10	4	6	0	1	1	−2	0
54	Jason Doig	D	55	3	5	8	−3	108	6	0	1	1	1	6
21	Glen Metropolit	C	23	2	3	5	4	6	—	—	—	—	—	—
16	Andreas Salomonsson†	RW	32	1	4	5	−1	14	—	—	—	—	—	—
4	Rick Berry	D	43	2	1	3	−3	87	—	—	—	—	—	—
8	Josh Green†	LW	21	1	2	3	1	7	—	—	—	—	—	—
29	Joel Kwiatkowski†	D	34	0	3	3	1	12	6	0	0	0	1	2
23	Trent Whitfield	C	14	1	1	2	1	6	6	0	0	0	1	10
44	Steve Eminger	D	17	0	2	2	−3	24	—	—	—	—	—	—
17	Chris Simon‡	LW	10	0	2	2	−3	23	—	—	—	—	—	—
39	Josef Boumedienne†	D	6	1	0	1	−1	0	—	—	—	—	—	—
51	Stephen Peat	RW	27	1	0	1	−3	57	—	—	—	—	—	—
58	Jean-Francois Fortin	D	33	0	1	1	−3	22	—	—	—	—	—	—
1	Craig Billington‡	G	5	0	0	0		0	—	—	—	—	—	—
35	Sebastien Charpentier	G	17	0	0	0		0	—	—	—	—	—	—
3	Sylvain Cote‡	D	1	0	0	0	0	4	—	—	—	—	—	—
41	Mike Farrell	RW	4	0	0	0	1	2	—	—	—	—	—	—
36	Colin Forbes	C	5	0	0	0	−2	0	—	—	—	—	—	—
45	Alex Henry†	D	38	0	0	0	−4	80	—	—	—	—	—	—
37	Olaf Kolzig	G	66	0	0	0		0	6	0	0	0		4
18	Matt Pettinger	LW	1	0	0	0	0	0	—	—	—	—	—	—

=== Goaltending ===
- ‡ = Left team via a transaction (e.g., trade, waivers, release) during the season. Stats reflect time with the Capitals only.

No.	Player	Regular season										Playoffs								
No.	Player	GP	W	L	T	SA	GA	GAA	SV%	SO	TOI	GP	W	L	SA	GA	GAA	SV%	SO	TOI
37	Olaf Kolzig	66	33	25	6	1925	156	2.40	.919	4	3894	6	2	4	192	14	2.08	.927	1	404
35	Sebastien Charpentier	17	5	7	1	426	40	2.79	.906	0	859	—	—	—	—	—	—	—	—	—
1	Craig Billington‡	5	1	3	1	96	17	4.70	.823	0	217	—	—	—	—	—	—	—	—	—

== Awards and records ==
=== Awards ===
Type	Award/honor	Recipient	Ref
League (annual)	NHL Second All-Star Team	Sergei Gonchar (Defense)	
League (in-season)	NHL All-Star Game selection	Sergei Gonchar	
League (in-season)	NHL All-Star Game selection	Jaromir Jagr (Note: Jagr was voted to the starting lineup.)	
League (in-season)	NHL YoungStars Game selection	Brian Sutherby	

=== Milestones ===
Milestone	Player	Date	Ref
First game	Steve Eminger	October 11, 2002	

== Transactions ==
The Capitals were involved in the following transactions from June 14, 2002, the day after the deciding game of the 2002 Stanley Cup Finals, through June 9, 2003, the day of the deciding game of the 2003 Stanley Cup Finals.

=== Trades ===
Date	Details		Ref
June 22, 2002	To Washington Capitals: Rights to Petr Sykora	To Nashville Predators: Conditional 3rd-round pick in 2003	
October 7, 2002	To Washington Capitals: Mike Grier	To Edmonton Oilers: 2nd-round pick in 2003; 3rd-round pick in 2003	
November 1, 2002	To Washington Capitals: Michael Nylander; 3rd-round pick in 2003; Conditional 3rd-round pick in 2004	To Chicago Blackhawks: Andrei Nikolishin; Chris Simon	
December 16, 2002	To Washington Capitals: Josef Boumedienne	To Ottawa Senators: Dean Melanson	
January 15, 2003	To Washington Capitals: Joel Kwiatkowski	To Ottawa Senators: Future considerations (Note: 9th-round pick in 2003)	
March 11, 2003	To Washington Capitals: Sergei Berezin	To Chicago Blackhawks: 4th-round pick in 2004	

=== Players acquired ===
Date	Player	Former team	Term	Via	Ref
July 1, 2002	Robert Lang	Pittsburgh Penguins	5-year	Free agency	
July 9, 2002	Kip Miller	New York Islanders	2-year	Free agency	
July 9, 2002	Dwayne Zinger	Detroit Red Wings	1-year (Note: Club option for a second year.)	Free agency	
July 23, 2002	Chris Hajt	Edmonton Oilers	1-year	Free agency	
September 13, 2002	Jason Doig	Ottawa Senators	1-year	Free agency	
October 4, 2002	Rick Berry	Pittsburgh Penguins		Waiver draft	
October 15, 2002	Andreas Salomonsson	New Jersey Devils		Waivers	
October 24, 2002	Alex Henry	Edmonton Oilers		Waivers	
January 15, 2003	Josh Green	New York Rangers		Waivers	

=== Players lost ===
Date	Player	New team	Via (Note: In parentheses is the player's free agency group on July 1 if applicable.)	Ref
N/A	Dmitri Khristich	Metallurg Magnitogorsk (RSL)	Free agency (III)	
July 1, 2002	Martin Hlinka (Note: Hlinka was inactive during the 2002–03 season.)		Contract expiration (UFA)	
July 1, 2002	Dmitri Mironov (Note: Mironov, who last played during the 2000–01 season, retired.)		Contract expiration (III)	
August 5, 2002	Patrick Boileau	Detroit Red Wings	Free agency (VI)	
August 11, 2002	Benoit Hogue		Retirement (III)	
August 13, 2002	Ulf Dahlen	Dallas Stars	Free agency (III)	
August 14, 2002	Corey Hirsch	Dallas Stars	Free agency (UFA)	
August 27, 2002	Rob Zettler		Retirement (III)	
October 10, 2002	Mike Siklenka	Philadelphia Phantoms (AHL)	Free agency (UFA)	
November 12, 2002	Sylvain Cote (Note: Cote retired.)		Release	
November 13, 2002	Curtis Cruickshank	San Diego Gulls (ECHL)	Free agency (UFA)	
January 2, 2003	Joe Sacco	Philadelphia Phantoms (AHL)	Free agency (III)	
December 16, 2002	Craig Billington (Note: Billington retired and was named a goaltending coach with the Colorado Avalanche on January 7, 2003.)		Buyout	
April 22, 2003	Glen Metropolit	Jokerit (Liiga)	Free agency (Note: Washington retained Metropolit’s NHL rights until they were claimed in the NHL Waiver Draft by the Ottawa Senators on October 3, 2003.)	

=== Signings ===
Date	Player	Term	Contract type	Ref
July 23, 2002	Ivan Ciernik	1-year	Re-signing	
July 23, 2002	Mark Murphy	1-year	Re-signing	
July 23, 2002	Trent Whitfield	1-year	Re-signing	
July 24, 2002	Chris Simon	1-year	Re-signing	
July 30, 2002	Jean-Francois Fortin	1-year	Re-signing	
July 31, 2002	Colin Forbes	1-year	Re-signing	
July 31, 2002	Glen Metropolit	1-year	Re-signing	
September 6, 2002	Chris Ferraro	1-year	Re-signing	
September 6, 2002	Peter Ferraro	1-year	Re-signing	
September 13, 2002	Owen Fussey	3-year	Entry-level	
October 7, 2002	Steve Eminger	3-year	Entry-level	
October 8, 2002	Dainius Zubrus	2-year	Re-signing	
March 20, 2003	Sebastien Charpentier	1-year	Extension	
May 15, 2003	Josef Boumedienne	1-year	Extension	

== Draft picks ==
Washington's draft picks at the 2002 NHL entry draft held at the Air Canada Centre in Toronto, Ontario.

Round	#	Player	Nationality	College/Junior/Club team (League)
1	12	Steve Eminger	Canada	Kitchener Rangers (OHL)
1	13	Alexander Semin	Russia	Traktor Chelyabinsk Jrs. (Russia)
1	17	Boyd Gordon	Canada	Red Deer Rebels (WHL)
2	59	Maxime Daigneault	Canada	Val-d'Or Foreurs (QMJHL)
3	77	Patrick Wellar	Canada	Portland Winterhawks (WHL)
3	92	Derek Krestanovich	Canada	Moose Jaw Warriors (WHL)
4	109	Jevon Desautels	Canada	Spokane Chiefs (WHL)
4	118	Petr Dvorak	Czech Republic	Havirov Femax HC (Czech Republic)
5	145	Robert Gherson	Canada	Sarnia Sting (OHL)
6	179	Marian Havel	Czech Republic	Vancouver Giants (WHL)
7	209	Joni Lindlof	Finland	Tappara Jr. (Finland)
8	242	Igor Ignatushkin	Russia	Elemash Elektrosal (Russia)
9	272	Patric Blomdahl	Sweden	AIK IF Jr. (Sweden)

== See also ==
- 2002–03 NHL season
