= 2002–03 Montreal Canadiens season =

NHL hockey team season

2002–03 Montreal Canadiens
- Division: 4th Northeast
- Conference: 9th Eastern
- 2002–03 record: 30–35–8–9
- Home record: 16–16–5–4
- Road record: 14–19–3–5
- Goals for: 206
- Goals against: 234

Team information
- General manager: Andre Savard
- Coach: Michel Therrien (Oct.–Jan.); Claude Julien (Jan.–Apr.)
- Captain: Saku Koivu
- Alternate captains: Patrice Brisebois; Doug Gilmour (Oct.–Mar.)
- Arena: Bell Centre
- Average attendance: 20,672 (97.2%)
- Minor league affiliates: Hamilton Bulldogs; Columbus Cottonmouths

Team leaders
- Goals: Richard Zednik (31)
- Assists: Saku Koivu (50)
- Points: Saku Koivu (71)
- Penalty minutes: Richard Zednik (79)
- Plus/minus: Andrei Markov (+13)
- Wins: Jose Theodore (20)
- Goals against average: Mathieu Garon (1.99)

The 2002–03 Montreal Canadiens season was the club's 94th season of play. Facing numerous challenges throughout the season including a coaching change, the team did not qualify for the Stanley Cup playoffs for the first time since the 2000–01 season.

== Regular season ==
Before the start of the season, many predicted a strong showing from the Canadiens as a result of a healthy Saku Koivu and last season's Hart Memorial Trophy winner, Jose Theodore. The team was .500 for the first two months of the season and showed little improvement in December. Players such as Mariusz Czerkawski, added to the lineup during the summer, and Donald Audette were slow to produce offence for the team, and the two forwards were both sent down for brief stints in the minors. Moreover, Jose Theodore's performances were not up to par with his MVP-winning season of a year earlier. Despite strong seasons from Koivu, Richard Zednik and Yanic Perreault, the Canadiens slid to 11th place in the Eastern Conference in mid-January. This losing streak prompted General Manager Andre Savard to fire head coach Michel Therrien and replace him with Claude Julien, who filled the same role behind the bench of the Habs' American Hockey League (AHL) affiliate, the Hamilton Bulldogs. Despite Julien's arrival, the team was unable to improve its situation and saw their playoff hopes evaporate with a nine-game winless streak that ended in early March. Despite Saku Koivu's 71 points and Richard Zednik's 31 goals, the Canadiens missed the playoffs for the fourth time in five seasons. The Canadiens ended with a record of 30–35–9–8, and former MVP Theodore had a disappointing season with a record of 20–31–6.

The Canadiens finished the regular season tying the Nashville Predators for the fewest short-handed goals scored, with just two.

=== Final standings ===
Northeast Division
No.	CR		GP	W	L	T	OTL	GF	GA	Pts
1	1	**Ottawa Senators**	82	52	21	8	1	263	182	113
2	5	**Toronto Maple Leafs**	82	44	28	7	3	236	208	98
3	7	**Boston Bruins**	82	36	31	11	4	245	237	87
4	10	Montreal Canadiens	82	30	35	8	9	206	234	77
5	12	Buffalo Sabres	82	27	37	10	8	190	219	72

Note: CR = Conference rank; GP = Games played; W = Wins; L = Losses; T = Ties; OTL = Overtime loss; GF = Goals for; GA = Goals against; Pts = Points
Bolded teams qualified for the playoffs.

Eastern Conference
R		Div	GP	W	L	T	OTL	GF	GA	Pts
**1**	**P-** Ottawa Senators	**NE**	**82**	**52**	**21**	**8**	**1**	**263**	**182**	113
**2**	**Y-** New Jersey Devils	**AT**	**82**	**46**	**20**	**10**	**6**	**216**	**166**	108
**3**	**Y-** Tampa Bay Lightning	**SE**	**82**	**36**	**25**	**16**	**5**	**219**	**210**	93
**4**	**X-** Philadelphia Flyers	**AT**	**82**	**45**	**20**	**13**	**4**	**211**	**166**	107
**5**	**X-** Toronto Maple Leafs	**NE**	**82**	**44**	**28**	**7**	**3**	**236**	**208**	98
**6**	**X-** Washington Capitals	**SE**	**82**	**39**	**29**	**8**	**6**	**224**	**220**	92
**7**	**X-** Boston Bruins	**NE**	**82**	**36**	**31**	**11**	**4**	**245**	**237**	87
**8**	**X-** New York Islanders	**AT**	**82**	**35**	**34**	**11**	**2**	**224**	**231**	83
8.5
9	New York Rangers	AT	82	32	36	10	4	210	231	78
10	Montreal Canadiens	NE	82	30	35	8	9	206	234	77
11	Atlanta Thrashers	SE	82	31	39	7	5	226	284	74
12	Buffalo Sabres	NE	82	27	37	10	8	190	219	72
13	Florida Panthers	SE	82	24	36	13	9	176	237	70
14	Pittsburgh Penguins	AT	82	27	44	6	5	189	255	65
15	Carolina Hurricanes	SE	82	22	43	11	6	171	240	61

Divisions: AT – Atlantic, NE – Northeast, SE – Southeast

P – Clinched Presidents Trophy; Y – Clinched division; X – Clinched playoff spot

== Schedule and results ==
2002–03 regular season
October: 3–3–3–0 (home: 1–2–3–0; road: 2–1–0–0)

Game	Date	Score	Opponent	Record	Points	Recap
1	October 11, 2002	4–1	@ New York Rangers (2002–03)	1–0–0–0	2	W
2	October 12, 2002	1–6	Buffalo Sabres (2002–03)	1–1–0–0	2	L
3	October 15, 2002	2–6	Philadelphia Flyers (2002–03)	1–2–0–0	2	L
4	October 17, 2002	3–2	@ Detroit Red Wings (2002–03)	2–2–0–0	4	W
5	October 19, 2002	2–2 OT	Toronto Maple Leafs (2002–03)	2–2–1–0	5	T
6	October 22, 2002	3–3 OT	Pittsburgh Penguins (2002–03)	2–2–2–0	6	T
7	October 24, 2002	2–6	@ Philadelphia Flyers (2002–03)	2–3–2–0	6	L
8	October 26, 2002	5–3	Ottawa Senators (2002–03)	3–3–2–0	8	W
9	October 29, 2002	2–2 OT	Mighty Ducks of Anaheim (2002–03)	3–3–3–0	9	T

November: 7–6–1–1 (home: 5–3–0–1; road: 2–3–1–0)

Game	Date	Score	Opponent	Record	Points	Recap
10	November 1, 2002	2–2 OT	@ Carolina Hurricanes (2002–03)	3–3–4–0	10	T
11	November 2, 2002	5–2	@ Toronto Maple Leafs (2002–03)	4–3–4–0	12	W
12	November 5, 2002	2–5	St. Louis Blues (2002–03)	4–4–4–0	12	L
13	November 7, 2002	3–0	New York Islanders (2002–03)	5–4–4–0	14	W
14	November 9, 2002	3–1	Los Angeles Kings (2002–03)	6–4–4–0	16	W
15	November 12, 2002	2–4	Dallas Stars (2002–03)	6–5–4–0	16	L
16	November 15, 2002	1–5	@ New Jersey Devils (2002–03)	6–6–4–0	16	L
17	November 16, 2002	3–1	New Jersey Devils (2002–03)	7–6–4–0	18	W
18	November 18, 2002	5–4 OT	Pittsburgh Penguins (2002–03)	8–6–4–0	20	W
19	November 20, 2002	3–2 OT	@ Pittsburgh Penguins (2002–03)	9–6–4–0	22	W
20	November 21, 2002	2–3	@ Ottawa Senators (2002–03)	9–7–4–0	22	L
21	November 23, 2002	3–7	Carolina Hurricanes (2002–03)	9–8–4–0	22	L
22	November 26, 2002	3–2	Atlanta Thrashers (2002–03)	10–8–4–0	24	W
23	November 29, 2002	2–4	@ Boston Bruins (2002–03)	10–9–4–0	24	L
24	November 30, 2002	1–2 OT	Philadelphia Flyers (2002–03)	10–9–4–1	25	OTL

December: 6–5–1–2 (home: 2–2–0–0; road: 4–3–1–2)

Game	Date	Score	Opponent	Record	Points	Recap
25	December 4, 2002	1–5	@ Dallas Stars (2002–03)	10–10–4–1	25	L
26	December 6, 2002	6–7 OT	@ Colorado Avalanche (2002–03)	10–10–4–2	26	OTL
27	December 7, 2002	4–2	@ Phoenix Coyotes (2002–03)	11–10–4–2	28	W
28	December 10, 2002	4–2	@ Boston Bruins (2002–03)	12–10–4–2	30	W
29	December 12, 2002	2–3	Tampa Bay Lightning (2002–03)	12–11–4–2	30	L
30	December 14, 2002	4–2	Boston Bruins (2002–03)	13–11–4–2	32	W
31	December 16, 2002	3–2	@ Ottawa Senators (2002–03)	14–11–4–2	34	W
32	December 17, 2002	1–3	San Jose Sharks (2002–03)	14–12–4–2	34	L
33	December 19, 2002	3–1	@ New York Rangers (2002–03)	15–12–4–2	36	W
34	December 21, 2002	6–2	Buffalo Sabres (2002–03)	16–12–4–2	38	W
35	December 23, 2002	1–3	@ New York Islanders (2002–03)	16–13–4–2	38	L
36	December 27, 2002	2–3 OT	@ Ottawa Senators (2002–03)	16–13–4–3	39	OTL
37	December 28, 2002	2–3	@ Pittsburgh Penguins (2002–03)	16–14–4–3	39	L
38	December 31, 2002	1–1 OT	@ Calgary Flames (2002–03)	16–14–5–3	40	T

January: 5–6–2–2 (home: 4–1–1–1; road: 1–5–1–1)

Game	Date	Score	Opponent	Record	Points	Recap
39	January 2, 2003	2–3	@ Vancouver Canucks (2002–03)	16–15–5–3	40	L
40	January 4, 2003	4–5 OT	@ Edmonton Oilers (2002–03)	16–15–5–4	41	OTL
41	January 7, 2003	2–3	@ New Jersey Devils (2002–03)	16–16–5–4	41	L
42	January 9, 2003	3–2	New York Rangers (2002–03)	17–16–5–4	43	W
43	January 11, 2003	2–3	Buffalo Sabres (2002–03)	17–17–5–4	43	L
44	January 13, 2003	4–2	Calgary Flames (2002–03)	18–17–5–4	45	W
45	January 15, 2003	0–1	@ Atlanta Thrashers (2002–03)	18–18–5–4	45	L
46	January 16, 2003	1–4	@ Philadelphia Flyers (2002–03)	18–19–5–4	45	L
47	January 18, 2003	2–3 OT	Toronto Maple Leafs (2002–03)	18–19–5–5	46	OTL
48	January 20, 2003	3–2	@ Florida Panthers (2002–03)	19–19–5–5	48	W
49	January 22, 2003	2–2 OT	@ Tampa Bay Lightning (2002–03)	19–19–6–5	49	T
50	January 25, 2003	1–1 OT	Washington Capitals (2002–03)	19–19–7–5	50	T
51	January 26, 2003	4–3	Chicago Blackhawks (2002–03)	20–19–7–5	52	W
52	January 28, 2003	6–3	Florida Panthers (2002–03)	21–19–7–5	54	W
53	January 30, 2003	1–3	@ New York Islanders (2002–03)	21–20–7–5	54	L

February: 3–7–0–2 (home: 2–4–0–1; road: 1–3–0–1)

Game	Date	Score	Opponent	Record	Points	Recap
54	February 4, 2003	3–4	Atlanta Thrashers (2002–03)	21–21–7–5	54	L
55	February 6, 2003	3–6	@ Boston Bruins (2002–03)	21–22–7–5	54	L
56	February 8, 2003	1–3	@ Toronto Maple Leafs (2002–03)	21–23–7–5	54	L
57	February 9, 2003	2–0	@ Washington Capitals (2002–03)	22–23–7–5	56	W
58	February 11, 2003	3–1	Boston Bruins (2002–03)	23–23–7–5	58	W
59	February 13, 2003	1–2 OT	Columbus Blue Jackets (2002–03)	23–23–7–6	59	OTL
60	February 15, 2003	3–2	Edmonton Oilers (2002–03)	24–23–7–6	61	W
61	February 18, 2003	0–3	Florida Panthers (2002–03)	24–24–7–6	61	L
62	February 19, 2003	1–2 OT	@ Buffalo Sabres (2002–03)	24–24–7–7	62	OTL
63	February 22, 2003	3–5	Toronto Maple Leafs (2002–03)	24–25–7–7	62	L
64	February 24, 2003	1–4	@ Washington Capitals (2002–03)	24–26–7–7	62	L
65	February 27, 2003	3–6	Minnesota Wild (2002–03)	24–27–7–7	62	L

March: 5–7–1–2 (home: 1–4–1–1; road: 4–3–0–1)

Game	Date	Score	Opponent	Record	Points	Recap
66	March 1, 2003	1–1 OT	Vancouver Canucks (2002–03)	24–27–8–7	63	T
67	March 5, 2003	1–3	@ Mighty Ducks of Anaheim (2002–03)	24–28–8–7	63	L
68	March 6, 2003	3–4 OT	@ San Jose Sharks (2002–03)	24–28–8–8	64	OTL
69	March 8, 2003	1–2	@ Los Angeles Kings (2002–03)	24–29–8–8	64	L
70	March 10, 2003	3–1	@ Nashville Predators (2002–03)	25–29–8–8	66	W
71	March 12, 2003	4–0	@ Florida Panthers (2002–03)	26–29–8–8	68	W
72	March 13, 2003	4–2	@ Atlanta Thrashers (2002–03)	27–29–8–8	70	W
73	March 15, 2003	1–2	Tampa Bay Lightning (2002–03)	27–30–8–8	70	L
74	March 18, 2003	0–1	New Jersey Devils (2002–03)	27–31–8–8	70	L
75	March 20, 2003	3–6	New York Islanders (2002–03)	27–32–8–8	70	L
76	March 22, 2003	5–3	Carolina Hurricanes (2002–03)	28–32–8–8	72	W
77	March 25, 2003	3–4 OT	Washington Capitals (2002–03)	28–32–8–9	73	OTL
78	March 28, 2003	1–4	@ Buffalo Sabres (2002–03)	28–33–8–9	73	L
79	March 29, 2003	1–3	Ottawa Senators (2002–03)	28–34–8–9	73	L
80	March 31, 2003	4–0	@ Carolina Hurricanes (2002–03)	29–34–8–9	75	W

April: 1–1–0–0 (home: 1–0–0–0; road: 0–1–0–0)

Game	Date	Score	Opponent	Record	Points	Recap
81	April 2, 2003	1–2	@ Tampa Bay Lightning (2002–03)	29–35–8–9	75	L
82	April 5, 2003	5–4	New York Rangers (2002–03)	30–35–8–9	77	W

Legend: W Win (2 points) L Loss (0 points) T Tie (1 point) OTL Overtime loss (1 point)

== Player statistics ==
=== Scoring ===
- Position abbreviations: C = Centre; D = Defence; G = Goaltender; LW = Left wing; RW = Right wing
- † = Joined team via a transaction (e.g., trade, waivers, signing) during the season. Stats reflect time with the Canadiens only.
- ‡ = Left team via a transaction (e.g., trade, waivers, release) during the season. Stats reflect time with the Canadiens only.

No.	Player	Pos	Regular season					
No.	Player	Pos	GP	G	A	Pts	+/-	PIM
11	Saku Koivu	C	82	21	50	71	5	72
20	Richard Zednik	RW	80	31	19	50	4	79
94	Yanic Perreault	C	73	24	22	46	−11	30
38	Jan Bulis	C	82	16	24	40	9	30
79	Andrei Markov	D	79	13	24	37	13	34
93	Doug Gilmour‡	C	61	11	19	30	−6	36
43	Patrice Brisebois	D	73	4	25	29	−14	32
24	Andreas Dackell	RW	73	7	18	25	−5	24
82	Donald Audette	RW	54	11	12	23	−7	19
14	Oleg Petrov‡	RW	53	7	16	23	−2	16
52	Craig Rivet	D	82	7	15	22	1	71
90	Joe Juneau	C	72	6	16	22	−10	20
21	Randy McKay	RW	75	6	13	19	−14	72
71	Mike Ribeiro	C	52	5	12	17	−3	6
25	Chad Kilger	LW	60	9	7	16	−4	21
27	Mariusz Czerkawski	RW	43	5	9	14	−7	16
37	Niklas Sundstrom†	RW	33	5	9	14	3	8
81	Marcel Hossa	LW	34	6	7	13	3	14
54	Patrick Traverse	D	65	0	13	13	−9	24
5	Stephane Quintal	D	67	5	5	10	−4	70
17	Jason Ward	RW	8	3	2	5	3	0
28	Karl Dykhuis	D	65	1	4	5	−5	34
51	Francis Bouillon†	D	20	3	1	4	−1	2
22	Bill Lindsay	RW	19	0	2	2	−1	23
60	Jose Theodore	G	57	0	2	2		6
8	Mike Komisarek	D	21	0	1	1	−6	28
36	Francois Beauchemin	D	1	0	0	0	−1	0
26 (Note: Blouin wore number 53 in his first two games.)	Sylvain Blouin†	LW	17	0	0	0	−3	43
32	Gordie Dwyer†	LW	11	0	0	0	−2	46
30	Mathieu Garon	G	8	0	0	0		0
31	Jeff Hackett‡	G	18	0	0	0		0
65	Ron Hainsey	D	21	0	0	0	−1	2

=== Goaltending ===
- ‡ = Left team via a transaction (e.g., trade, waivers, release) during the season. Stats reflect time with the Canadiens only.

No.	Player	Regular season									
No.	Player	GP	W	L	T	SA	GA	GAA	SV%	SO	TOI
60	Jose Theodore	57	20	31	6	1797	165	2.90	.908	2	3419
31	Jeff Hackett‡	18	7	8	2	606	45	2.54	.926	0	1063
30	Mathieu Garon	8	3	5	0	267	16	1.99	.940	2	482

== Awards and records ==
=== Awards ===
Type	Award/honour	Recipient	Ref
League (in-season)	NHL All-Star Game selection	Saku Koivu (Note: Koivu did not play and was replaced by Olli Jokinen of the Florida Panthers.)	
League (in-season)	NHL YoungStars Game selection	Marcel Hossa	
Team	Jacques Beauchamp Molson Trophy	Jan Bulis	
Team	Molson Cup	Jose Theodore	

=== Milestones ===
Milestone	Player	Date	Ref
First game	Ron Hainsey	October 11, 2002	
First game	Mike Komisarek	February 19, 2003	
First game	Francois Beauchemin	February 27, 2003	

== Transactions ==
The Canadiens were involved in the following transactions from June 14, 2002, the day after the deciding game of the 2002 Stanley Cup Finals, through June 9, 2003, the day of the deciding game of the 2003 Stanley Cup Finals.

=== Trades ===
Date	Details		Ref
June 22, 2002	To Montreal Canadiens: 1st-round pick in 2002	To Edmonton Oilers: 1st-round pick in 2002; 8th-round pick in 2002	
June 22, 2002	To Montreal Canadiens: Mariusz Czerkawski	To New York Islanders: Arron Asham; 5th-round pick in 2002	
June 23, 2002	To Montreal Canadiens: Florida’s 4th-round pick in 2002	To Calgary Flames: 4th-round pick in 2002; Minnesota’s 5th-round pick in 2002	
June 30, 2002	To Montreal Canadiens: 4th-round pick in 2004	To Chicago Blackhawks: Sergei Berezin	
October 31, 2002	To Montreal Canadiens: Sylvain Blouin	To Minnesota Wild: 7th-round pick in 2003	
January 17, 2003 (Note: Compensation due to Montreal hiring Julien as their head coach.)	To Montreal Canadiens: Claude Julien	To Edmonton Oilers: 5th-round pick in 2003	
January 23, 2003	To Montreal Canadiens: Niklas Sundstrom; 3rd-round pick in 2004	To San Jose Sharks: Jeff Hackett	
January 29, 2003	To Montreal Canadiens: 2nd-round pick in 2003	To Philadelphia Flyers: Eric Chouinard	
March 3, 2003	To Montreal Canadiens: 4th-round pick in 2003	To Nashville Predators: Oleg Petrov	
March 11, 2003	To Montreal Canadiens: 6th-round pick in 2003	To Toronto Maple Leafs: Doug Gilmour	

=== Players acquired ===
Date	Player	Former team	Term	Via	Ref
July 4, 2002	Randy McKay	Dallas Stars	2-year	Free agency	
July 4, 2002	Matt O'Dette	Quebec Citadelles (AHL)	1-year (Note: Club option for a second year.)	Free agency	
September 10, 2002	Eric Fichaud	Krefeld Pinguine (DEL)	1-year	Free agency	
October 25, 2002	Francis Bouillon	Nashville Predators		Waivers	
February 21, 2003	Gordie Dwyer	New York Rangers		Waivers	

=== Players lost ===
Date	Player	New team	Via (Note: In parentheses is the player's free agency group on July 1 if applicable.)	Ref
N/A	Gennady Razin	Amur Khabarovsk (RSL)	Free agency (UFA)	
July 4, 2002	Craig Darby	New Jersey Devils (Note: Darby signed with New Jersey on July 12.)	Buyout	
July 4, 2002	Patrick Poulin (Note: Poulin announced his retirement on November 20.)		Buyout	
July 24, 2002	Shaun Van Allen	Ottawa Senators	Free agency (III)	
August 22, 2002	Francis Belanger	Anaheim Mighty Ducks	Free agency (UFA)	
August 23, 2002	Vadim Tarasov	Metallurg Novokuznetsk (RSL)	Free agency (II) (Note: Montreal retained Tarasov’s NHL rights through the 2005–06 season.)	
September 9, 2002	Stephane Fiset		Retirement (III)	
October 4, 2002	Francis Bouillon	Nashville Predators	Waiver draft	
October 4, 2002	Stephane Robidas	Atlanta Thrashers	Waiver draft	
April 9, 2003	Eric Landry	Lausanne HC (NLA)	Free agency	

=== Signings ===
Date	Player	Term	Contract type	Ref
June 21, 2002	Saku Koivu	1-year	Re-signing	
July 4, 2002	Benoit Gratton	2-year	Re-signing	
July 15, 2002	Andreas Dackell	2-year	Re-signing	
July 19, 2002	Mike Ribeiro	1-year	Re-signing	
July 19, 2002	Jason Ward	1-year	Re-signing	
July 24, 2002	Mike Komisarek	3-year	Entry-level	
July 26, 2002	Chad Kilger	1-year	Re-signing	
August 2, 2002	Francis Bouillon	1-year	Re-signing	
August 2, 2002	Mathieu Garon	1-year	Re-signing	
August 2, 2002	Sheldon Souray	2-year	Re-signing	
August 9, 2002	Doug Gilmour	1-year (Note: Option for a second year.)	Re-signing	
September 5, 2002	Jose Theodore	3-year	Re-signing	
September 18, 2002	Richard Zednik	2-year	Re-signing	
September 26, 2002	Craig Rivet	4-year	Extension	
February 28, 2003	Mathieu Garon	2-year (Note: Club option for a third year.)	Extension	
April 11, 2003	Jason Ward	2-year	Extension	
May 5, 2003	Jan Bulis	2-year	Extension	
May 22, 2003	Chris Higgins	3-year	Entry-level	
May 29, 2003	Andrew Archer	3-year	Entry-level	
May 29, 2003	Francis Bouillon	2-year	Extension	
May 29, 2003	Duncan Milroy	3-year	Entry-level	

== Draft picks ==
Montreal's draft picks at the 2002 NHL entry draft held at the Air Canada Centre in Toronto, Ontario.

Round	#	Player	Nationality	College/Junior/Club team (League)
1	14	Chris Higgins	United States	Yale University (ECAC)
2	45	Tomas Linhart	Czech Republic	HC Pardubice Jr. (Czech Republic)
4	99	Michael Lambert	Canada	Montreal Rocket (QMJHL)
6	182	Andre Deveaux	Canada	Belleville Bulls (OHL)
7	212	Jonathan Ferland	Canada	Acadie-Bathurst Titan (QMJHL)
9	275	Konstantin Korneyev	Russia	Krylya Sovetov (Russia)

== See also ==
- 2002–03 NHL season
