= 2002–03 St. Louis Blues season =

National Hockey League team season

2002–03 St. Louis Blues
- Division: 2nd Central
- Conference: 5th Western
- 2002–03 record: 41–24–11–6
- Home record: 23–11–4–3
- Road record: 18–13–7–3
- Goals for: 253
- Goals against: 222

Team information
- General manager: Larry Pleau
- Coach: Joel Quenneville
- Captain: Chris Pronger; Al MacInnis (interim)
- Alternate captains: Al MacInnis; Scott Mellanby; Doug Weight
- Arena: Savvis Center
- Average attendance: 18,570
- Minor league affiliates: Worcester IceCats; Peoria Rivermen

Team leaders
- Goals: Pavol Demitra (36)
- Assists: Pavol Demitra (57)
- Points: Pavol Demitra (93)
- Penalty minutes: Reed Low (234)
- Plus/minus: Barret Jackman (+23)
- Wins: Brent Johnson (16)
- Goals against average: Brent Johnson (2.47)

The 2002–03 St. Louis Blues season was the 36th for the franchise in St. Louis, Missouri. The Blues finished the regular-season with a record of 41 wins, 24 losses, 11 overtime losses and 6 ties, good for 99 points, and the team qualified for the Stanley Cup playoffs for the 24th consecutive season, only to lose in the Western Conference Quarterfinals to the Vancouver Canucks in seven games.

Captain Chris Pronger missed most of the regular season with an injured wrist. Al MacInnis filled in as interim captain and continued to serve in the role through the end of the season even after Pronger returned to the lineup.

== Regular season ==
- January 14, 2003: the Blues scored three short-handed goals in a 4–1 road win over the Phoenix Coyotes.
- April 6, 2003: In a game against the St. Louis Blues, Patrick Roy of the Colorado Avalanche played the last regular season game of his career. The Avalanche won the game by a score of 5–2. It was Roy's 1,029th game, and his 551st victory.

=== Final standings ===
Central Division
No.	CR		GP	W	L	T	OTL	GF	GA	Pts
1	2	**Detroit Red Wings**	82	48	20	10	4	269	203	110
2	5	**St. Louis Blues**	82	41	24	11	6	253	222	99
3	9	Chicago Blackhawks	82	30	33	13	6	207	226	79
4	13	Nashville Predators	82	27	35	13	7	183	206	74
5	15	Columbus Blue Jackets	82	29	42	8	3	213	263	69

Note: CR = Conference rank; GP = Games played; W = Wins; L = Losses; T = Ties; OTL = Overtime loss; GF = Goals for; GA = Goals against; Pts = Points
Bolded teams qualified for the playoffs.

Western Conference
R		Div	GP	W	L	T	OTL	GF	GA	Pts
**1**	**Z-** Dallas Stars	**PA**	**82**	**46**	**17**	**15**	**4**	**245**	**169**	111
**2**	**Y-** Detroit Red Wings	**CE**	**82**	**48**	**20**	**10**	**4**	**269**	**203**	110
**3**	**Y-** Colorado Avalanche	**NW**	**82**	**42**	**19**	**13**	**8**	**251**	**194**	105
**4**	**X-** Vancouver Canucks	**NW**	**82**	**45**	**23**	**13**	**1**	**264**	**208**	104
**5**	**X-** St. Louis Blues	**CE**	**82**	**41**	**24**	**11**	**6**	**253**	**222**	99
**6**	**X-** Minnesota Wild	**NW**	**82**	**42**	**29**	**10**	**1**	**198**	**178**	95
**7**	**X-** Mighty Ducks of Anaheim	**PA**	**82**	**40**	**27**	**9**	**6**	**203**	**193**	95
**8**	**X-** Edmonton Oilers	**NW**	**82**	**36**	**26**	**11**	**9**	**231**	**230**	92
8.5
9	Chicago Blackhawks	CE	82	30	33	13	6	207	226	79
10	Los Angeles Kings	PA	82	33	37	6	6	203	221	78
11	Phoenix Coyotes	PA	82	31	35	11	5	204	230	78
12	Calgary Flames	NW	82	29	36	13	4	186	228	75
13	Nashville Predators	CE	82	27	35	13	7	183	206	74
14	San Jose Sharks	PA	82	28	37	9	8	214	239	73
15	Columbus Blue Jackets	CE	82	29	42	8	3	213	263	69

Divisions: PA – Pacific, CE – Central, NW – Northwest

Z – Clinched conference; Y – Clinched division; X – Clinched playoff spot

== Schedule and results ==
=== Regular season ===
2002–03 regular season
October: 6–1–1–0 (home: 4–1–1–0; road: 2–0–0–0)

Game	Date	Score	Opponent	Record	Recap
1	October 10, 2002	3–4	Mighty Ducks of Anaheim (2002–03)	0–1–0–0	L
2	October 12, 2002	2–2 OT	Minnesota Wild (2002–03)	0–1–1–0	T
3	October 15, 2002	2–1 OT	Carolina Hurricanes (2002–03)	1–1–1–0	W
4	October 17, 2002	7–1	Columbus Blue Jackets (2002–03)	2–1–1–0	W
5	October 19, 2002	5–3	Dallas Stars (2002–03)	3–1–1–0	W
6	October 24, 2002	2–1	@ Edmonton Oilers (2002–03)	4–1–1–0	W
7	October 26, 2002	4–3 OT	@ Calgary Flames (2002–03)	5–1–1–0	W
8	October 30, 2002	7–0	Nashville Predators (2002–03)	6–1–1–0	W

November: 7–6–1–1 (home: 3–3–0–1; road: 4–3–1–0)

Game	Date	Score	Opponent	Record	Recap
9	November 2, 2002	6–1	@ New York Islanders (2002–03)	7–1–1–0	W
10	November 3, 2002	3–2	@ New York Rangers (2002–03)	8–1–1–0	W
11	November 5, 2002	5–2	@ Montreal Canadiens (2002–03)	9–1–1–0	W
12	November 7, 2002	2–5	Columbus Blue Jackets (2002–03)	9–2–1–0	L
13	November 9, 2002	6–3	Toronto Maple Leafs (2002–03)	10–2–1–0	W
14	November 12, 2002	3–6	@ Vancouver Canucks (2002–03)	10–3–1–0	L
15	November 15, 2002	0–5	@ Edmonton Oilers (2002–03)	10–4–1–0	L
16	November 16, 2002	1–0	@ Calgary Flames (2002–03)	11–4–1–0	W
17	November 20, 2002	2–3	@ Columbus Blue Jackets (2002–03)	11–5–1–0	L
18	November 21, 2002	3–2 OT	Los Angeles Kings (2002–03)	12–5–1–0	W
19	November 23, 2002	1–3	Colorado Avalanche (2002–03)	12–6–1–0	L
20	November 25, 2002	1–4	San Jose Sharks (2002–03)	12–7–1–0	L
21	November 27, 2002	4–4 OT	@ Colorado Avalanche (2002–03)	12–7–2–0	T
22	November 29, 2002	7–2	Calgary Flames (2002–03)	13–7–2–0	W
23	November 30, 2002	4–5 OT	New Jersey Devils (2002–03)	13–7–2–1	OTL

December: 7–4–3–1 (home: 4–0–1–0; road: 3–4–2–1)

Game	Date	Score	Opponent	Record	Recap
24	December 3, 2002	4–0	@ Boston Bruins (2002–03)	14–7–2–1	W
25	December 5, 2002	2–2 OT	Ottawa Senators (2002–03)	14–7–3–1	T
26	December 7, 2002	3–1	@ Philadelphia Flyers (2002–03)	15–7–3–1	W
27	December 8, 2002	3–4 OT	@ Detroit Red Wings (2002–03)	15–7–3–2	OTL
28	December 10, 2002	0–2	@ New Jersey Devils (2002–03)	15–8–3–2	L
29	December 12, 2002	2–2 OT	@ Nashville Predators (2002–03)	15–8–4–2	T
30	December 14, 2002	4–0	Atlanta Thrashers (2002–03)	16–8–4–2	W
31	December 17, 2002	2–6	@ Los Angeles Kings (2002–03)	16–9–4–2	L
32	December 18, 2002	2–5	@ Mighty Ducks of Anaheim (2002–03)	16–10–4–2	L
33	December 20, 2002	3–3 OT	@ Phoenix Coyotes (2002–03)	16–10–5–2	T
34	December 23, 2002	5–0	Los Angeles Kings (2002–03)	17–10–5–2	W
35	December 26, 2002	3–2	Colorado Avalanche (2002–03)	18–10–5–2	W
36	December 28, 2002	6–1	@ Columbus Blue Jackets (2002–03)	19–10–5–2	W
37	December 29, 2002	5–2	Columbus Blue Jackets (2002–03)	20–10–5–2	W
38	December 31, 2002	1–5	@ Detroit Red Wings (2002–03)	20–11–5–2	L

January: 8–4–1–2 (home: 3–2–0–1; road: 5–2–1–1)

Game	Date	Score	Opponent	Record	Recap
39	January 2, 2003	1–4	Chicago Blackhawks (2002–03)	20–12–5–2	L
40	January 4, 2003	5–1	Tampa Bay Lightning (2002–03)	21–12–5–2	W
41	January 7, 2003	1–2 OT	@ Nashville Predators (2002–03)	21–12–5–3	OTL
42	January 9, 2003	4–1	@ San Jose Sharks (2002–03)	22–12–5–3	W
43	January 11, 2003	2–1	@ Los Angeles Kings (2002–03)	23–12–5–3	W
44	January 12, 2003	1–2	@ Mighty Ducks of Anaheim (2002–03)	23–13–5–3	L
45	January 14, 2003	4–1	@ Phoenix Coyotes (2002–03)	24–13–5–3	W
46	January 16, 2003	2–3 OT	New York Islanders (2002–03)	24–13–5–4	OTL
47	January 18, 2003	4–2	Chicago Blackhawks (2002–03)	25–13–5–4	W
48	January 20, 2003	5–3	@ Carolina Hurricanes (2002–03)	26–13–5–4	W
49	January 21, 2003	4–8	@ Atlanta Thrashers (2002–03)	26–14–5–4	L
50	January 23, 2003	3–3 OT	@ Chicago Blackhawks (2002–03)	26–14–6–4	T
51	January 25, 2003	2–4	Dallas Stars (2002–03)	26–15–6–4	L
52	January 28, 2003	5–3	@ Washington Capitals (2002–03)	27–15–6–4	W
53	January 30, 2003	2–1 OT	Buffalo Sabres (2002–03)	28–15–6–4	W

February: 4–3–2–2 (home: 3–2–1–1; road: 1–1–1–1)

Game	Date	Score	Opponent	Record	Recap
54	February 5, 2003	2–2 OT	@ Dallas Stars (2002–03)	28–15–7–4	T
55	February 6, 2003	4–4 OT	New York Rangers (2002–03)	28–15–8–4	T
56	February 8, 2003	4–1	San Jose Sharks (2002–03)	29–15–8–4	W
57	February 11, 2003	3–2	@ Buffalo Sabres (2002–03)	30–15–8–4	W
58	February 13, 2003	3–4 OT	Philadelphia Flyers (2002–03)	30–15–8–5	OTL
59	February 15, 2003	3–5	Phoenix Coyotes (2002–03)	30–16–8–5	L
60	February 17, 2003	5–3	Calgary Flames (2002–03)	31–16–8–5	W
61	February 20, 2003	2–4	Vancouver Canucks (2002–03)	31–17–8–5	L
62	February 22, 2003	1–2 OT	@ Pittsburgh Penguins (2002–03)	31–17–8–6	OTL
63	February 23, 2003	1–3	@ Minnesota Wild (2002–03)	31–18–8–6	L
64	February 27, 2003	4–1	Edmonton Oilers (2002–03)	32–18–8–6	W

March: 9–4–2–0 (home: 6–2–1–0; road: 3–2–1–0)

Game	Date	Score	Opponent	Record	Recap
65	March 1, 2003	2–0	Minnesota Wild (2002–03)	33–18–8–6	W
66	March 4, 2003	2–1 OT	Nashville Predators (2002–03)	34–18–8–6	W
67	March 6, 2003	6–3	Phoenix Coyotes (2002–03)	35–18–8–6	W
68	March 7, 2003	2–7	@ Detroit Red Wings (2002–03)	35–19–8–6	L
69	March 11, 2003	4–2	@ San Jose Sharks (2002–03)	36–19–8–6	W
70	March 13, 2003	4–4 OT	@ Vancouver Canucks (2002–03)	36–19–9–6	T
71	March 15, 2003	1–0	@ Nashville Predators (2002–03)	37–19–9–6	W
72	March 18, 2003	6–4	Vancouver Canucks (2002–03)	38–19–9–6	W
73	March 20, 2003	3–2 OT	Mighty Ducks of Anaheim (2002–03)	39–19–9–6	W
74	March 22, 2003	2–4	Detroit Red Wings (2002–03)	39–20–9–6	L
75	March 23, 2003	1–3	@ Dallas Stars (2002–03)	39–21–9–6	L
76	March 26, 2003	1–0	@ Minnesota Wild (2002–03)	40–21–9–6	W
77	March 27, 2003	2–1	Florida Panthers (2002–03)	41–21–9–6	W
78	March 29, 2003	2–6	Detroit Red Wings (2002–03)	41–22–9–6	L
79	March 31, 2003	5–5 OT	Edmonton Oilers (2002–03)	41–22–10–6	T

April: 0–2–1–0 (home: 0–1–0–0; road: 0–1–1–0)

Game	Date	Score	Opponent	Record	Recap
80	April 3, 2003	4–6	Chicago Blackhawks (2002–03)	41–23–10–6	L
81	April 4, 2003	2–2 OT	@ Chicago Blackhawks (2002–03)	41–23–11–6	T
82	April 6, 2003	2–5	@ Colorado Avalanche (2002–03)	41–24–11–6	L

Legend: W Win (2 points) L Loss (0 points) T Tie (1 point) OTL Overtime loss (1 point)

=== Playoffs ===
2003 Stanley Cup playoffs
Western Conference Quarterfinals vs. (4) Vancouver Canucks: Vancouver won 4–3

Game	Date	Visitor	Score	Home	OT	Decision	Attendance	Series	Recap
1	April 10	St. Louis	6–0	Vancouver		Osgood	18,514	Blues lead 1–0	W
2	April 12	St. Louis	1–2	Vancouver		Osgood	18,514	Series tied 1–1	L
3	April 14	Vancouver	1–3	St. Louis		Osgood	19,699	Blues lead 2–1	W
4	April 16	Vancouver	1–4	St. Louis		Osgood	19,936	Blues lead 3–1	W
5	April 18	St. Louis	3–5	Vancouver		Osgood	18,514	Blues lead 3–2	L
6	April 20	Vancouver	4–3	St. Louis		Osgood	19,522	Series tied 3–3	L
7	April 22	St. Louis	1–4	Vancouver		Osgood	18,514	Canucks win 4–3	L

Legend: W Win L Loss

== Player statistics ==
=== Scoring ===
- Position abbreviations: C = Center; D = Defense; G = Goaltender; LW = Left wing; RW = Right wing
- † = Joined team via a transaction (e.g., trade, waivers, signing) during the season. Stats reflect time with the Blues only.
- ‡ = Left team via a transaction (e.g., trade, waivers, release) during the season. Stats reflect time with the Blues only.

No.	Player	Pos	Regular season						Playoffs					
No.	Player	Pos	GP	G	A	Pts	+/-	PIM	GP	G	A	Pts	+/-	PIM
38	Pavol Demitra	LW	78	36	57	93	0	32	7	2	4	6	2	2
2	Al MacInnis	D	80	16	52	68	22	61	3	0	1	1	0	0
61	Cory Stillman	LW	79	24	43	67	12	56	6	2	2	4	0	2
39	Doug Weight	C	70	15	52	67	−6	52	7	5	8	13	0	2
19	Scott Mellanby	RW	80	26	31	57	1	176	6	0	1	1	0	10
7	Keith Tkachuk	LW	56	31	24	55	1	139	7	1	3	4	−1	14
33	Eric Boguniecki	C	80	22	27	49	22	38	7	1	2	3	−2	2
26	Petr Cajanek	RW	51	9	29	38	16	20	2	0	0	0	−1	2
29	Alexander Khavanov	D	81	8	25	33	−1	48	7	2	3	5	0	2
10	Dallas Drake	RW	80	20	10	30	−7	66	7	1	4	5	0	23
22	Martin Rucinsky†	LW	61	16	14	30	−1	38	7	4	2	6	−3	4
5	Barret Jackman	D	82	3	16	19	23	190	7	0	0	0	−2	14
25	Shjon Podein	LW	68	4	6	10	7	28	7	0	1	1	1	6
27	Bryce Salvador	D	71	2	8	10	7	95	7	0	0	0	1	2
9	Tyson Nash	LW	66	6	3	9	0	114	7	2	1	3	3	6
46	Christian Laflamme	D	47	0	9	9	1	45	5	0	0	0	−1	4
21	Jamal Mayers	RW	15	2	5	7	1	8	—	—	—	—	—	—
12	Steve Martins†	C	28	3	3	6	−8	18	2	0	1	1	1	0
6	Tom Koivisto	D	22	2	4	6	1	10	—	—	—	—	—	—
34	Reed Low	RW	79	2	4	6	3	234	—	—	—	—	—	—
18	Steve Dubinsky	C	28	0	6	6	3	4	—	—	—	—	—	—
32	Mike Eastwood‡	C	17	1	3	4	1	8	—	—	—	—	—	—
37	Jeff Finley	D	64	1	3	4	−2	46	6	0	0	0	1	6
44	Chris Pronger	D	5	1	3	4	−2	10	7	1	3	4	3	14
63	Justin Papineau‡	C	11	2	1	3	−1	0	—	—	—	—	—	—
43	Mike Van Ryn‡	D	20	0	3	3	3	8	—	—	—	—	—	—
13	Valeri Bure†	RW	5	0	2	2	−2	0	6	0	2	2	2	8
15	Peter Sejna†	LW	1	1	0	1	0	0	—	—	—	—	—	—
35	Brent Johnson	G	38	0	1	1		2	—	—	—	—	—	—
20 (Note: Nickulas wore number 68 in his first two games.)	Eric Nickulas	RW	8	0	1	1	−2	6	—	—	—	—	—	—
28	Matt Walker	D	16	0	1	1	0	38	—	—	—	—	—	—
55	Christian Backman	D	4	0	0	0	−3	0	—	—	—	—	—	—
30	Tom Barrasso†‡	G	6	0	0	0		0	—	—	—	—	—	—
40	Fred Brathwaite‡	G	30	0	0	0		0	—	—	—	—	—	—
15	Daniel Corso	C	1	0	0	0	−1	0	—	—	—	—	—	—
50	Reinhard Divis	G	2	0	0	0		0	—	—	—	—	—	—
17	Ryan Johnson†	C	17	0	0	0	0	12	6	0	2	2	3	6
30	Chris Osgood†	G	9	0	0	0		0	7	0	0	0		4
45	Cody Rudkowsky	G	1	0	0	0		0	—	—	—	—	—	—
1	Curtis Sanford	G	8	0	0	0		0	—	—	—	—	—	—
23 (Note: Varlamov wore number 17 in his first game.)	Sergei Varlamov	LW	3	0	0	0	1	0	—	—	—	—	—	—

=== Goaltending ===
- † = Joined team via a transaction (e.g., trade, waivers, signing) during the season. Stats reflect time with the Blues only.
- ‡ = Left team via a transaction (e.g., trade, waivers, release) during the season. Stats reflect time with the Blues only.

No.	Player	Regular season										Playoffs								
No.	Player	GP	W	L	T	SA	GA	GAA	SV%	SO	TOI	GP	W	L	SA	GA	GAA	SV%	SO	TOI
35	Brent Johnson	38	16	13	5	844	84	2.47	.900	2	2042	—	—	—	—	—	—	—	—	—
40	Fred Brathwaite‡	30	12	9	4	631	74	2.75	.883	2	2042	—	—	—	—	—	—	—	—	—
1	Curtis Sanford	8	5	1	0	148	13	1.96	.912	1	397	—	—	—	—	—	—	—	—	—
30	Chris Osgood†	9	4	3	2	241	27	3.05	.888	2	532	7	3	4	183	17	2.45	.907	1	417
50	Reinhard Divis	2	2	0	0	34	1	0.72	.971	0	83	—	—	—	—	—	—	—	—	—
30	Tom Barrasso†‡	6	1	4	0	132	16	3.28	.879	1	293	—	—	—	—	—	—	—	—	—
45	Cody Rudkowsky	1	1	0	0	10	0	0.00	1.000	0	30	—	—	—	—	—	—	—	—	—

== Awards and records ==
=== Awards ===
Type	Award/honor	Recipient	Ref
League (annual)	Calder Memorial Trophy	Barret Jackman	
League (annual)	NHL All-Rookie Team	Barret Jackman (Defense)	
League (annual)	NHL First All-Star Team	Al MacInnis (Defense)	
League (in-season)	NHL All-Star Game selection	Al MacInnis	
League (in-season)	NHL All-Star Game selection	Doug Weight	
League (in-season)	NHL Player of the Week	Brent Johnson (December 30)	
League (in-season)	NHL YoungStars Game selection	Barret Jackman	

=== Milestones ===
Milestone	Player	Date	Ref
First game	Petr Cajanek	October 10, 2002	
First game	Tom Koivisto	October 10, 2002	
First game	Curtis Sanford	October 17, 2002	
First game	Cody Rudkowsky	October 24, 2002	
First game	Matt Walker	December 10, 2002	
First game	Christian Backman	February 11, 2003	
First game	Peter Sejna	April 6, 2003	
500th game played	Chris Osgood	April 3, 2003	

== Transactions ==
The Blues were involved in the following transactions from June 14, 2002, the day after the deciding game of the 2002 Stanley Cup Finals, through June 9, 2003, the day of the deciding game of the 2003 Stanley Cup Finals.

=== Trades ===
Date	Details		Ref
June 22, 2002	To St. Louis Blues: 2nd-round pick in 2002; 5th-round pick in 2002	To Boston Bruins: 2nd-round pick in 2002	
December 5, 2002	To St. Louis Blues: Conditional draft pick	To Colorado Avalanche: Dale Clarke	
March 11, 2003	To St. Louis Blues: Valeri Bure; Conditional 5th-round pick in 2004	To Florida Panthers: Mike Van Ryn	
March 11, 2003	To St. Louis Blues: Chris Osgood; 3rd-round pick in 2003	To New York Islanders: Justin Papineau; 2nd-round pick in 2003	

=== Players acquired ===
Date	Player	Former team	Term	Via	Ref
July 16, 2002	Steve Bancroft	San Jose Sharks		Free agency	
July 16, 2002	Steve Dubinsky	Nashville Predators		Free agency	
July 16, 2002	Eric Nickulas	Worcester IceCats (AHL)		Free agency	
July 23, 2002	Jason Dawe	New York Rangers		Free agency	
August 9, 2002	Aris Brimanis	Anaheim Mighty Ducks		Free agency	
October 7, 2002	Mike Stuart	Colorado College (WCHA)		Free agency	
October 30, 2002	Martin Rucinsky	New York Rangers		Free agency	
November 4, 2002	Tom Barrasso	Toronto Maple Leafs		Free agency	
January 15, 2003	Steve Martins	Ottawa Senators		Waivers	
February 19, 2003	Ryan Johnson	Florida Panthers		Waivers	
March 20, 2003	Greg Black	Seattle Thunderbirds (WHL)		Free agency	
April 5, 2003	Peter Sejna	Colorado College (WCHA)		Free agency	

=== Players lost ===
Date	Player	New team	Via (Note: In parentheses is the player's free agency group on July 1 if applicable.)	Ref
June 2002	Steven Halko	Carolina Hurricanes (Note: Halko signed with Carolina on August 5.)	Buyout	
July 5, 2002	Scott Young	Dallas Stars	Free agency (III)	
July 12, 2002	Tyler Rennette	Peoria Rivermen (ECHL)	Free agency (UFA)	
July 18, 2002	Marc Bergevin	Pittsburgh Penguins	Free agency (III)	
August 2, 2002	Ray Ferraro		Retirement (III)	
August 5, 2002	Ed Campbell	Detroit Red Wings	Free agency (VI)	
December 11, 2002	Mike Eastwood	Chicago Blackhawks	Waivers	
December 28, 2002	Tom Barrasso		Mutual release	
March 18, 2003	Fred Brathwaite		Mutual release	

=== Signings ===
Date	Player	Term	Contract type	Ref
June 27, 2002	Eric Boguniecki	1-year	Option exercised	
June 27, 2002	Mike Eastwood	1-year	Option exercised	
June 27, 2002	Brent Johnson	1-year	Option exercised	
June 27, 2002	Reed Low	1-year	Option exercised	
July 3, 2002	Petr Cajanek		Entry-level	
July 10, 2002	Jeff Finley	2-year	Re-signing	
July 10, 2002	Tom Koivisto		Entry-level	
July 12, 2002	Christian Backman		Entry-level	
July 15, 2002	Fred Brathwaite	1-year	Re-signing	
July 15, 2002	Keith Tkachuk	1-year	Re-signing	
July 19, 2002	Alexander Khavanov		Re-signing	
July 19, 2002	Christian Laflamme		Re-signing	
July 24, 2002	Daniel Corso		Re-signing	
July 24, 2002	Jamal Mayers		Re-signing	
July 31, 2002	Marc Brown		Re-signing	
July 31, 2002	Dale Clarke		Re-signing	
July 31, 2002	Cody Rudkowsky		Re-signing	
July 31, 2002	Mark Rycroft		Re-signing	
July 31, 2002	Cory Stillman		Re-signing	
July 31, 2002	Daniel Tkaczuk		Re-signing	
September 5, 2002	Steve McLaren		Re-signing	
September 12, 2002	Keith Tkachuk	5-year	Re-signing	
September 21, 2002	Jame Pollock		Re-signing	
October 30, 2002	Eric Boguniecki		Extension	
February 14, 2003	Jay McClement		Entry-level	

== Draft picks ==
St. Louis's draft picks at the 2002 NHL entry draft held at the Air Canada Centre in Toronto, Ontario.

Round	#	Player	Nationality	College/Junior/Club team (League)
2	48	Aleksei Shkotov	Russia	Elemash Elektrostal (Russia)
2	62	Andriy Mikhnov	Ukraine	Sudbury Wolves (OHL)
3	89	Tomas Troliga	Slovakia	HK Spišská Nová Ves (Slovakia)
4	120	Robin Jonsson	Sweden	Bofors IK (Sweden)
5	165	Justin Maiser	United States	Boston University (Hockey East)
6	190	D. J. King	Canada	Lethbridge Hurricanes (WHL)
7	221	Jonas Johnson	Sweden	Västra Frölunda HC (Sweden)
8	253	Tom Koivisto	Finland	Jokerit (Finland)
9	284	Ryan MacMurchy	Canada	Notre Dame Hounds (SJHL)

== See also ==
- 2002–03 NHL season
