= 2002–03 Los Angeles Kings season =

National Hockey League team season

2002–03 Los Angeles Kings
- Division: 3rd Pacific
- Conference: 10th Western
- 2002–03 record: 33–37–6–6
- Home record: 19–19–2–1
- Road record: 14–18–4–5
- Goals for: 203
- Goals against: 221

Team information
- General manager: Dave Taylor
- Coach: Andy Murray
- Captain: Mattias Norstrom
- Alternate captains: Ian Laperriere; Mathieu Schneider; Bryan Smolinski
- Arena: Staples Center
- Average attendance: 17,569
- Minor league affiliates: Manchester Monarchs; Reading Royals

Team leaders
- Goals: Zigmund Palffy (37)
- Assists: Zigmund Palffy (48)
- Points: Zigmund Palffy (85)
- Penalty minutes: Ian Laperriere (122)
- Plus/minus: Zigmund Palffy (+22)
- Wins: Felix Potvin (17)
- Goals against average: Jamie Storr (2.55)

The 2002–03 Los Angeles Kings season was the Kings' 36th season in the National Hockey League (NHL). The Kings failed to qualify for the playoffs for the first time since 1999, ending a three season playoff streak.

== Regular season ==
The Kings tied the Detroit Red Wings, New Jersey Devils and Washington Capitals for the fewest short-handed goals allowed, with just four.

=== Final standings ===
Pacific Division
No.	CR		GP	W	L	T	OTL	GF	GA	Pts
1	1	**Dallas Stars**	82	46	17	15	4	245	169	111
2	7	**Mighty Ducks of Anaheim**	82	40	27	9	6	203	193	95
3	10	Los Angeles Kings	82	33	37	6	6	203	221	78
4	11	Phoenix Coyotes	82	31	35	11	5	204	230	78
5	14	San Jose Sharks	82	28	37	9	8	214	239	73

Note: CR = Conference rank; GP = Games played; W = Wins; L = Losses; T = Ties; OTL = Overtime loss; GF = Goals for; GA = Goals against; Pts = Points
Bolded teams qualified for the playoffs.

Western Conference
R		Div	GP	W	L	T	OTL	GF	GA	Pts
**1**	**Z-** Dallas Stars	**PA**	**82**	**46**	**17**	**15**	**4**	**245**	**169**	111
**2**	**Y-** Detroit Red Wings	**CE**	**82**	**48**	**20**	**10**	**4**	**269**	**203**	110
**3**	**Y-** Colorado Avalanche	**NW**	**82**	**42**	**19**	**13**	**8**	**251**	**194**	105
**4**	**X-** Vancouver Canucks	**NW**	**82**	**45**	**23**	**13**	**1**	**264**	**208**	104
**5**	**X-** St. Louis Blues	**CE**	**82**	**41**	**24**	**11**	**6**	**253**	**222**	99
**6**	**X-** Minnesota Wild	**NW**	**82**	**42**	**29**	**10**	**1**	**198**	**178**	95
**7**	**X-** Mighty Ducks of Anaheim	**PA**	**82**	**40**	**27**	**9**	**6**	**203**	**193**	95
**8**	**X-** Edmonton Oilers	**NW**	**82**	**36**	**26**	**11**	**9**	**231**	**230**	92
8.5
9	Chicago Blackhawks	CE	82	30	33	13	6	207	226	79
10	Los Angeles Kings	PA	82	33	37	6	6	203	221	78
11	Phoenix Coyotes	PA	82	31	35	11	5	204	230	78
12	Calgary Flames	NW	82	29	36	13	4	186	228	75
13	Nashville Predators	CE	82	27	35	13	7	183	206	74
14	San Jose Sharks	PA	82	28	37	9	8	214	239	73
15	Columbus Blue Jackets	CE	82	29	42	8	3	213	263	69

Divisions: PA – Pacific, CE – Central, NW – Northwest

Z – Clinched conference; Y – Clinched division; X – Clinched playoff spot

== Schedule and results ==
2002–03 regular season
October: 5–2–2–1 (home: 2–1–1–0; road: 3–1–1–1)

Game	Date	Score	Opponent	Record	Recap
1	October 9, 2002	4–1	Phoenix Coyotes (2002–03)	1–0–0–0	W
2	October 12, 2002	3–2	Detroit Red Wings (2002–03)	2–0–0–0	W
3	October 16, 2002	4–2	@ Mighty Ducks of Anaheim (2002–03)	3–0–0–0	W
4	October 17, 2002	1–4	Colorado Avalanche (2002–03)	3–1–0–0	L
5	October 19, 2002	2–2 OT	Vancouver Canucks (2002–03)	3–1–1–0	T
6	October 23, 2002	3–3 OT	@ Detroit Red Wings (2002–03)	3–1–2–0	T
7	October 25, 2002	6–2	@ New York Rangers (2002–03)	4–1–2–0	W
8	October 27, 2002	1–5	@ Columbus Blue Jackets (2002–03)	4–2–2–0	L
9	October 29, 2002	4–0	@ Atlanta Thrashers (2002–03)	5–2–2–0	W
10	October 31, 2002	1–2 OT	@ Chicago Blackhawks (2002–03)	5–2–2–1	OTL

November: 5–5–2–2 (home: 3–2–0–0; road: 2–3–2–2)

Game	Date	Score	Opponent	Record	Recap
11	November 2, 2002	6–5 OT	Nashville Predators (2002–03)	6–2–2–1	W
12	November 4, 2002	2–5	Minnesota Wild (2002–03)	6–3–2–1	L
13	November 5, 2002	2–5	@ San Jose Sharks (2002–03)	6–4–2–1	L
14	November 8, 2002	3–2	@ Ottawa Senators (2002–03)	7–4–2–1	W
15	November 9, 2002	1–3	@ Montreal Canadiens (2002–03)	7–5–2–1	L
16	November 12, 2002	3–4 OT	@ Toronto Maple Leafs (2002–03)	7–5–2–2	OTL
17	November 14, 2002	2–3	@ Vancouver Canucks (2002–03)	7–6–2–2	L
18	November 16, 2002	4–1	@ Edmonton Oilers (2002–03)	8–6–2–2	W
19	November 19, 2002	2–2 OT	@ Minnesota Wild (2002–03)	8–6–3–2	T
20	November 21, 2002	2–3 OT	@ St. Louis Blues (2002–03)	8–6–3–3	OTL
21	November 23, 2002	2–0	Dallas Stars (2002–03)	9–6–3–3	W
22	November 27, 2002	2–5	Florida Panthers (2002–03)	9–7–3–3	L
23	November 29, 2002	2–2 OT	@ Mighty Ducks of Anaheim (2002–03)	9–7–4–3	T
24	November 30, 2002	4–1	Chicago Blackhawks (2002–03)	10–7–4–3	W

December: 6–7–0–0 (home: 4–3–0–0; road: 2–4–0–0)

Game	Date	Score	Opponent	Record	Recap
25	December 5, 2002	2–3	Nashville Predators (2002–03)	10–8–4–3	L
26	December 7, 2002	2–4	Columbus Blue Jackets (2002–03)	10–9–4–3	L
27	December 10, 2002	3–0	@ Nashville Predators (2002–03)	11–9–4–3	W
28	December 11, 2002	3–0	@ Dallas Stars (2002–03)	12–9–4–3	W
29	December 14, 2002	3–2 OT	Pittsburgh Penguins (2002–03)	13–9–4–3	W
30	December 15, 2002	1–2	@ Phoenix Coyotes (2002–03)	13–10–4–3	L
31	December 17, 2002	6–2	St. Louis Blues (2002–03)	14–10–4–3	W
32	December 19, 2002	5–4	Mighty Ducks of Anaheim (2002–03)	15–10–4–3	W
33	December 22, 2002	1–3	@ Chicago Blackhawks (2002–03)	15–11–4–3	L
34	December 23, 2002	0–5	@ St. Louis Blues (2002–03)	15–12–4–3	L
35	December 26, 2002	4–3 OT	Phoenix Coyotes (2002–03)	16–12–4–3	W
36	December 29, 2002	1–6	@ Colorado Avalanche (2002–03)	16–13–4–3	L
37	December 30, 2002	0–2	Chicago Blackhawks (2002–03)	16–14–4–3	L

January: 4–10–0–1 (home: 3–6–0–0; road: 1–4–0–1)

Game	Date	Score	Opponent	Record	Recap
38	January 2, 2003	1–4	Philadelphia Flyers (2002–03)	16–15–4–3	L
39	January 4, 2003	2–3	Dallas Stars (2002–03)	16–16–4–3	L
40	January 6, 2003	3–2	@ Minnesota Wild (2002–03)	17–16–4–3	W
41	January 7, 2003	4–7	@ Dallas Stars (2002–03)	17–17–4–3	L
42	January 9, 2003	4–5	Edmonton Oilers (2002–03)	17–18–4–3	L
43	January 11, 2003	1–2	St. Louis Blues (2002–03)	17–19–4–3	L
44	January 13, 2003	3–2 OT	San Jose Sharks (2002–03)	18–19–4–3	W
45	January 16, 2003	0–2	@ Edmonton Oilers (2002–03)	18–20–4–3	L
46	January 18, 2003	1–2 OT	@ Calgary Flames (2002–03)	18–20–4–4	OTL
47	January 22, 2003	5–6	@ Mighty Ducks of Anaheim (2002–03)	18–21–4–4	L
48	January 23, 2003	1–2	Minnesota Wild (2002–03)	18–22–4–4	L
49	January 25, 2003	2–1 OT	New Jersey Devils (2002–03)	19–22–4–4	W
50	January 27, 2003	0–3	San Jose Sharks (2002–03)	19–23–4–4	L
51	January 28, 2003	1–3	@ San Jose Sharks (2002–03)	19–24–4–4	L
52	January 30, 2003	3–0	Ottawa Senators (2002–03)	20–24–4–4	W

February: 7–5–0–0 (home: 4–1–0–0; road: 3–4–0–0)

Game	Date	Score	Opponent	Record	Recap
53	February 5, 2003	4–3	Phoenix Coyotes (2002–03)	21–24–4–4	W
54	February 7, 2003	8–2	Carolina Hurricanes (2002–03)	22–24–4–4	W
55	February 9, 2003	1–3	@ Dallas Stars (2002–03)	22–25–4–4	L
56	February 11, 2003	3–2	@ Nashville Predators (2002–03)	23–25–4–4	W
57	February 13, 2003	4–2	Calgary Flames (2002–03)	24–25–4–4	W
58	February 15, 2003	2–3	New York Islanders (2002–03)	24–26–4–4	L
59	February 17, 2003	3–2	San Jose Sharks (2002–03)	25–26–4–4	W
60	February 20, 2003	0–5	@ Philadelphia Flyers (2002–03)	25–27–4–4	L
61	February 21, 2003	4–1	@ Buffalo Sabres (2002–03)	26–27–4–4	W
62	February 24, 2003	4–5	@ Detroit Red Wings (2002–03)	26–28–4–4	L
63	February 25, 2003	5–3	@ Pittsburgh Penguins (2002–03)	27–28–4–4	W
64	February 27, 2003	1–3	@ Columbus Blue Jackets (2002–03)	27–29–4–4	L

March: 4–7–2–2 (home: 2–5–1–2; road: 2–2–1–0)

Game	Date	Score	Opponent	Record	Recap
65	March 1, 2003	4–1	Atlanta Thrashers (2002–03)	28–29–4–4	W
66	March 4, 2003	1–2	Mighty Ducks of Anaheim (2002–03)	28–30–4–4	L
67	March 6, 2003	1–2	Edmonton Oilers (2002–03)	28–31–4–4	L
68	March 8, 2003	2–1	Montreal Canadiens (2002–03)	29–31–4–4	W
69	March 10, 2003	2–3	Detroit Red Wings (2002–03)	29–32–4–4	L
70	March 12, 2003	2–4	@ Tampa Bay Lightning (2002–03)	29–33–4–4	L
71	March 14, 2003	3–1	@ Washington Capitals (2002–03)	30–33–4–4	W
72	March 15, 2003	0–0 OT	@ Carolina Hurricanes (2002–03)	30–33–5–4	T
73	March 18, 2003	1–4	Calgary Flames (2002–03)	30–34–5–4	L
74	March 20, 2003	2–2 OT	Tampa Bay Lightning (2002–03)	30–34–6–4	T
75	March 22, 2003	3–4 OT	Boston Bruins (2002–03)	30–34–6–5	OTL
76	March 25, 2003	1–2 OT	Columbus Blue Jackets (2002–03)	30–35–6–5 (Note: Rule 84.2 of the NHL rulebook states "A team shall be allowed to pull its goalkeeper in favor of an additional skater in the overtime period. However, should that team lose the game during the time in which the goalkeeper has been removed, it would forfeit the automatic point gained in the tie at the end of regulation play, except if the goalkeeper has been removed at the call of a delayed penalty against the other team." The Kings pulled Huet in OT and lost the game in OT, so they forfeited that 1 point for the OTL)	OTL
77	March 27, 2003	0–3	@ Colorado Avalanche (2002–03)	30–36–6–5	L
78	March 29, 2003	1–5	Vancouver Canucks (2002–03)	30–37–6–5	L
79	March 31, 2003	5–4 OT	@ Phoenix Coyotes (2002–03)	31–37–6–5	W

April: 2–0–0–1 (home: 1–0–0–0; road: 1–0–0–1)

Game	Date	Score	Opponent	Record	Recap
80	April 2, 2003	5–3	Colorado Avalanche (2002–03)	32–37–6–5	W
81	April 4, 2003	1–2 OT	@ Calgary Flames (2002–03)	32–37–6–6	OTL
82	April 6, 2003	2–0	@ Vancouver Canucks (2002–03)	33–37–6–6	W

Legend: W Win (2 points) L Loss (0 points) T Tie (1 point) OTL Overtime loss (1 point)

== Player statistics ==
=== Scoring ===
- Position abbreviations: C = Center; D = Defense; G = Goaltender; LW = Left wing; RW = Right wing
- † = Joined team via a transaction (e.g., trade, waivers, signing) during the season. Stats reflect time with the Kings only.
- ‡ = Left team via a transaction (e.g., trade, waivers, release) during the season. Stats reflect time with the Kings only.

No.	Player	Pos	Regular season					
No.	Player	Pos	GP	G	A	Pts	+/-	PIM
33	Zigmund Palffy	RW	76	37	48	85	22	47
10	Mathieu Schneider‡	D	65	14	29	43	0	57
21	Bryan Smolinski‡	C	58	18	20	38	−1	18
44	Jaroslav Modry	D	82	13	25	38	−13	68
32	Derek Armstrong	C	66	12	26	38	5	30
25	Eric Belanger	C	62	16	19	35	−5	26
24	Alexander Frolov	LW	79	14	17	31	12	34
41	Jason Allison	C	26	6	22	28	9	22
17	Lubomir Visnovsky	D	57	8	16	24	2	28
22	Ian Laperriere	RW	73	7	12	19	−9	122
28	Adam Deadmarsh	RW	20	13	4	17	2	21
42	Mikko Eloranta	LW	75	5	12	17	−15	56
27 (Note: Rasmussen wore number 9 through January 9.)	Erik Rasmussen	C	57	4	12	16	−1	28
29	Brad Chartrand	C	62	8	6	14	−10	33
26	Joe Corvo	D	50	5	7	12	2	14
57	Steve Heinze	RW	27	5	7	12	−5	12
23	Craig Johnson	LW	70	3	6	9	−13	22
27	Jaroslav Bednar‡	RW	15	0	9	9	3	4
13	Michael Cammalleri	C	28	5	3	8	−4	22
63	Brad Norton	D	53	3	3	6	1	97
3	Aaron Miller	D	49	1	5	6	−7	24
14	Mattias Norstrom	D	82	0	6	6	0	49
11	Steve Kelly	C	15	2	3	5	−6	0
31	Jared Aulin	C	17	2	2	4	−3	0
19	Sean Avery†	C	12	1	3	4	0	33
6	Andreas Lilja‡	D	17	0	3	3	5	14
36	Dmitri Yushkevich†‡	D	42	0	3	3	−4	24
5	Tomas Zizka	D	10	0	3	3	−4	4
38	Chris McAlpine	D	21	0	2	2	−4	24
51	Chris Schmidt	C	10	0	2	2	−1	5
43	Jon Sim†	LW	14	0	2	2	−3	19
52	Jerred Smithson	C	22	0	2	2	−5	21
49	Ryan Flinn	LW	19	1	0	1	0	28
53	Jason Holland	D	2	0	1	1	1	0
1	Jamie Storr	G	39	0	1	1		8
62	Scott Barney	C	5	0	0	0	−1	0
58	Derek Bekar	LW	6	0	0	0	−1	4
12	Ken Belanger	LW	4	0	0	0	0	17
37	Kip Brennan	LW	19	0	0	0	0	57
35	Cristobal Huet	G	12	0	0	0		0
6	Maxim Kuznetsov†	D	3	0	0	0	1	0
39	Felix Potvin	G	42	0	0	0		4
55	Pavel Rosa	RW	2	0	0	0	−1	0

=== Goaltending ===
No.	Player	Regular season									
No.	Player	GP	W	L	T	SA	GA	GAA	SV%	SO	TOI
39	Felix Potvin	42	17	20	3	987	105	2.66	.894	3	2367
1	Jamie Storr	39	12	19	2	904	86	2.55	.905	3	2027
35	Cristobal Huet	12	4	4	1	241	21	2.33	.913	1	541

== Awards and records ==
=== Awards ===
Type	Award/honor	Recipient	Ref
League (in-season)	NHL All-Star Game selection	Mathieu Schneider	
League (in-season)	NHL YoungStars Game selection	Alexander Frolov	
Team	Ace Bailey Memorial Award	Ian Laperriere	
Team	Bill Libby Memorial Award	Zigmund Palffy	
Team	Defensive Player	Mattias Norstrom	
Team	Jim Fox Community Service	Craig Johnson	
Team	Jim Fox Community Service	Jamie Storr	
Team	Leading Scorer	Zigmund Palffy	
Team	Mark Bavis Memorial Award	Alexander Frolov	
Team	Most Popular Player	Ian Laperriere	
Team	Outstanding Defenseman	Mattias Norstrom	
Team	Unsung Hero	Derek Armstrong	

=== Milestones ===
Milestone	Player	Date	Ref
First game	Alexander Frolov	October 9, 2002	
First game	Michael Cammalleri	November 8, 2002	
First game	Joe Corvo	December 14, 2002	
First game	Jared Aulin	December 17, 2002	
First game	Jerred Smithson	December 29, 2002	
First game	Tomas Zizka	January 22, 2003	
First game	Scott Barney	January 25, 2003	
First game	Chris Schmidt	February 11, 2003	
First game	Cristobal Huet	February 20, 2003	

== Transactions ==
The Kings were involved in the following transactions from June 14, 2002, the day after the deciding game of the 2002 Stanley Cup Finals, through June 9, 2003, the day of the deciding game of the 2003 Stanley Cup Finals.

=== Trades ===
Date	Details		Ref
June 22, 2002	To Los Angeles Kings: 4th-round pick in 2002	To Minnesota Wild: Cliff Ronning	
July 16, 2002	To Los Angeles Kings: Derek Armstrong	To New York Rangers: Conditional draft pick in 2003 (Note: 6th-rounder)	
July 24, 2002	To Los Angeles Kings: Erik Rasmussen	To Buffalo Sabres: Adam Mair; 5th-round pick in 2003	
November 26, 2002	To Los Angeles Kings: Dmitri Yushkevich; 5th-round pick in 2003	To Florida Panthers: Jaroslav Bednar; Andreas Lilja	
February 4, 2003	To Los Angeles Kings: Greg Koehler	To Nashville Predators: Future considerations	
March 1, 2003	To Los Angeles Kings: 4th-round pick in 2003; 7th-round pick in 2004	To Philadelphia Flyers: Dmitri Yushkevich	
March 11, 2003	To Los Angeles Kings: Rights to Tim Gleason	To Ottawa Senators: Bryan Smolinski	
March 11, 2003	To Los Angeles Kings: Sean Avery; Maxim Kuznetsov; 1st-round pick in 2003; 2nd-round pick in 2004	To Detroit Red Wings: Mathieu Schneider	
May 28, 2003	To Los Angeles Kings: Roman Cechmanek	To Philadelphia Flyers: 2nd-round pick in 2004	

=== Players acquired ===
Date	Player	Former team	Term	Via	Ref
August 27, 2002	Chris McAlpine	Chicago Blackhawks		Free agency	
October 8, 2002	Brad Norton	Florida Panthers	1-year	Free agency	
March 8, 2003	Jon Sim	Nashville Predators		Waivers	

=== Players lost ===
Date	Player	New team	Via (Note: In parentheses is the player's free agency group on July 1 if applicable.)	Ref
June 30, 2002	Nelson Emerson (Note: Emerson retired on July 28.)		Buyout	
July 1, 2002	Nate Miller (Note: Miller retired.)		Contract expiration (UFA)	
July 1, 2002	Greg Phillips (Note: Phillips retired.)		Contract expiration (UFA)	
July 2, 2002	Philippe Boucher	Dallas Stars	Free agency (V)	
July 7, 2002	Kelly Buchberger	Phoenix Coyotes	Free agency (III)	
July 8, 2002	Ted Donato	New York Rangers	Free agency (III)	
July 18, 2002	Rich Brennan	Boston Bruins	Free agency (VI)	
July 20, 2002	Marcel Cousineau	Severstal Cherepovets (RSL)	Free agency (VI)	
July 24, 2002	Rob Valicevic	Anaheim Mighty Ducks	Free agency (UFA)	
September 5, 2002	Scott Thomas	San Jose Sharks	Free agency (UFA)	

=== Signings ===
Date	Player	Term	Contract type	Ref
June 27, 2002	Felix Potvin	1-year	Option exercised	
June 28, 2002	Derek Bekar	1-year	Option exercised	
June 28, 2002	Jason Holland	2-year	Re-signing	
July 8, 2002	Joe Corvo	2-year	Re-signing	
July 9, 2002	Cristobal Huet	2-year	Entry-level	
July 15, 2002	Alexander Frolov	3-year	Entry-level	
July 16, 2002	Derek Armstrong	1-year (Note: Club option for a second year.)	Re-signing	
July 16, 2002	Brad Chartrand	1-year	Re-signing	
July 16, 2002	Pavel Rosa	2-year	Re-signing	
July 16, 2002	Richard Seeley	1-year	Re-signing	
July 20, 2002	Adam Mair	1-year	Re-signing	
July 25, 2002	Michael Cammalleri	multi-year	Entry-level	
July 26, 2002	Eric Belanger	2-year	Re-signing	
July 30, 2002	Mike Pudlick	1-year	Re-signing	
August 1, 2002	Mikko Eloranta	1-year	Re-signing	
August 1, 2002	Steve Kelly	1-year	Re-signing	
August 1, 2002	Jamie Storr	1-year	Re-signing	
August 15, 2002	Jaroslav Bednar	1-year	Re-signing	
September 14, 2002	Mattias Norstrom	multi-year	Extension	
October 2, 2002	Scott Barney	1-year	Re-signing	
March 10, 2003	Aaron Miller	4-year	Extension	
April 3, 2003	Noah Clarke	1-year	Entry-level	
April 8, 2003	Zigmund Palffy	1-year	Option exercised	
April 8, 2003	Lubomir Visnovsky	1-year	Option exercised	
May 30, 2003	Tim Gleason	3-year	Entry-level	

== Draft picks ==
Los Angeles's draft picks at the 2002 NHL entry draft held at the Air Canada Centre in Toronto, Ontario.

Round	#	Player	Nationality	College/Junior/Club team (League)
1	18	Denis Grebeshkov	Russia	Lokomotiv Yaroslavl (Russia)
2	50	Sergei Anshakov	Russia	CSKA Moscow Jr. (Russia)
3	66	Petr Kanko	Czech Republic	Kitchener Rangers (OHL)
4	104	Aaron Rome	Canada	Swift Current Broncos (WHL)
4	115	Mark Rooneem	Canada	Kamloops Blazers (WHL)
5	152	Gregory Hogeboom	Canada	Miami University (NCHC)
5	157	Joel Andresen	Canada	St. Albert Steel (AJHL)
6	185	Ryan Murphy	United States	Boston College (Hockey East)
7	215	Mikhail Lyubushin	Russia	Krylya Sovetov (Russia)
8	248	Tuukka Pulliainen	Finland	TuTo (Finland)
9	279	Connor James	Canada	University of Denver (NCHC)
