= 2002–03 Edmonton Oilers season =

NHL team season

2002–03 Edmonton Oilers
- Division: 4th Northwest
- Conference: 8th Western
- 2002–03 record: 36–26–11–9
- Home record: 20–12–5–4
- Road record: 16–14–6–5
- Goals for: 231
- Goals against: 230

Team information
- General manager: Kevin Lowe
- Coach: Craig MacTavish
- Captain: Jason Smith
- Alternate captains: Todd Marchant; Janne Niinimaa (Oct.–Mar.); Ryan Smyth
- Arena: Skyreach Centre
- Average attendance: 16,657 (98.9%)
- Minor league affiliates: Hamilton Bulldogs (AHL); Columbus Cottonmouths (ECHL)

Team leaders
- Goals: Ryan Smyth (27)
- Assists: Todd Marchant (40)
- Points: Ryan Smyth (61)
- Penalty minutes: Scott Ferguson (120)
- Plus/minus: Marty Reasoner (+19)
- Wins: Tommy Salo (29)
- Goals against average: Jussi Markkanen (2.59)

The 2002–03 Edmonton Oilers season was the Oilers' 24th season in the NHL, and they were coming off a 38–28–12–4 record in 2001–02, earning 92 points, however, they missed the playoffs for the first time since 1996, finishing in 9th place in the Western Conference.

The Oilers got off to a slow start, winning only 1 of their first 7 games, going 1–4–2, however, the club turned around the tough start and move above the .500 mark on November 25 and never go below again for the remainder of the season. As the trade deadline approached in mid-March, and the club comfortably in a playoff position, Edmonton made a couple of deals, trading defenceman Janne Niinimaa and a second-round draft pick in the 2003 NHL Entry Draft to the New York Islanders in exchange for Brad Isbister and prospect Raffi Torres. The Oilers also traded Anson Carter and Aleš Píša to the New York Rangers for Radek Dvořák and Cory Cross. Edmonton finished the season with a 36–26–11–9 record, earning 92 points, the same amount as the previous season, and clinch the final playoff spot in the Western Conference.

Offensively, Ryan Smyth led the club with 27 goals and 61 points, while Todd Marchant had a breakout season, earning 40 assists and 60 points. Anson Carter had 25 goals and 55 points in 68 games before being dealt to the New York Rangers. Mike York and Mike Comrie each broke the 20 goal plateau, with 22 and 20 goals respectively. Eric Brewer led the Oilers defense with eight goals and 29 points, while Scott Ferguson had a team high 120 penalty minutes.

In goal, Tommy Salo once again got a majority of the playing time, winning 29 games, while posting a 2.71 goals against average (GAA) and earning four shutouts. Backup Jussi Markkanen had a very solid season, winning seven games, had a team-high 2.59 GAA and posted three shutouts.

The Oilers finished first overall in the NHL in short-handed goals scored, with 13.

After a year of absence, Edmonton returned to the post-season and would face their old rivals, the Dallas Stars, who finished with 111 points in the regular season. This was the sixth playoff meeting between the clubs in the past seven years, with Dallas winning four series in a row. Edmonton started the series on the right note, defeating the Stars 2–1 on the road. Dallas, however, routed the Oilers in Game 2 to even the series as it shifted to Edmonton The Oilers took a 2–1 series lead with a solid 3–2 victory in Game 3, but Dallas rebound in Game 4 to tie the series up at two games apiece. The Stars took control of the series, winning Game 5, 5–2, and end the series in Game 6, beating Edmonton 3–2, thereby eliminating the Oilers for the fifth time in the past six seasons.

== Season standings ==
Northwest Division
No.	CR		GP	W	L	T	OTL	GF	GA	Pts
1	3	**Colorado Avalanche**	82	42	19	13	8	251	194	105
2	4	**Vancouver Canucks**	82	45	23	13	1	264	208	104
3	6	**Minnesota Wild**	82	42	29	10	1	198	178	95
4	8	**Edmonton Oilers**	82	36	26	11	9	231	230	92
5	12	Calgary Flames	82	29	36	13	4	186	228	75

Note: CR = Conference rank; GP = Games played; W = Wins; L = Losses; T = Ties; OTL = Overtime loss; GF = Goals for; GA = Goals against; Pts = Points
Bolded teams qualified for the playoffs.

Western Conference
R		Div	GP	W	L	T	OTL	GF	GA	Pts
**1**	**Z-** Dallas Stars	**PA**	**82**	**46**	**17**	**15**	**4**	**245**	**169**	111
**2**	**Y-** Detroit Red Wings	**CE**	**82**	**48**	**20**	**10**	**4**	**269**	**203**	110
**3**	**Y-** Colorado Avalanche	**NW**	**82**	**42**	**19**	**13**	**8**	**251**	**194**	105
**4**	**X-** Vancouver Canucks	**NW**	**82**	**45**	**23**	**13**	**1**	**264**	**208**	104
**5**	**X-** St. Louis Blues	**CE**	**82**	**41**	**24**	**11**	**6**	**253**	**222**	99
**6**	**X-** Minnesota Wild	**NW**	**82**	**42**	**29**	**10**	**1**	**198**	**178**	95
**7**	**X-** Mighty Ducks of Anaheim	**PA**	**82**	**40**	**27**	**9**	**6**	**203**	**193**	95
**8**	**X-** Edmonton Oilers	**NW**	**82**	**36**	**26**	**11**	**9**	**231**	**230**	92
8.5
9	Chicago Blackhawks	CE	82	30	33	13	6	207	226	79
10	Los Angeles Kings	PA	82	33	37	6	6	203	221	78
11	Phoenix Coyotes	PA	82	31	35	11	5	204	230	78
12	Calgary Flames	NW	82	29	36	13	4	186	228	75
13	Nashville Predators	CE	82	27	35	13	7	183	206	74
14	San Jose Sharks	PA	82	28	37	9	8	214	239	73
15	Columbus Blue Jackets	CE	82	29	42	8	3	213	263	69

Divisions: PA – Pacific, CE – Central, NW – Northwest

Z – Clinched conference; Y – Clinched division; X – Clinched playoff spot

== Schedule and results ==
=== Regular season ===
2002–03 regular season
October: 2–4–2–1 (home: 1–2–1–1; road: 1–2–1–0)

Game	Date	Visitor	Score	Home	OT	Decision	Attendance	Record	Pts	Recap
1	October 10	Philadelphia Flyers	2–2	Edmonton Oilers	OT	Salo	16,839	0–0–1–0	1	T
2	October 12	Edmonton Oilers	3–2	Nashville Predators		Salo	17,113	1–0–1–0	3	W
3	October 15	Edmonton Oilers	0–3	Dallas Stars		Salo	18,532	1–1–1–0	3	L
4	October 17	Edmonton Oilers	3–4	San Jose Sharks		Salo	17,017	1–2–1–0	3	L
5	October 19	Boston Bruins	4–3	Edmonton Oilers		Salo	16,839	1–3–1–0	3	L
6	October 22	Edmonton Oilers	3–3	Colorado Avalanche	OT	Salo	18,007	1–3–2–0	4	T
7	October 24	St. Louis Blues	2–1	Edmonton Oilers		Markkanen	16,033	1–4–2–0	4	L
8	October 26	Mighty Ducks of Anaheim	3–4	Edmonton Oilers		Markkanen	16,357	2–4–2–0	6	W
9	October 28	Dallas Stars	4–3	Edmonton Oilers	OT	Markkanen	16,260	2–4–2–1	7	OTL

November: 9–4–2–0 (home: 3–1–2–0; road: 6–3–0–0)

Game	Date	Visitor	Score	Home	OT	Decision	Attendance	Record	Pts	Recap
10	November 1	Buffalo Sabres	1–1	Edmonton Oilers	OT	Salo	16,201	2–4–3–1	8	T
11	November 3	Edmonton Oilers	4–1	Chicago Blackhawks		Salo	12,531	3–4–3–1	10	W
12	November 5	Edmonton Oilers	2–5	New York Rangers		Salo	18,086	3–5–3–1	10	L
13	November 8	Edmonton Oilers	2–4	New York Islanders		Salo	14,093	3–6–3–1	10	L
14	November 9	Edmonton Oilers	6–3	New Jersey Devils		Markkanen	15,095	4–6–3–1	12	W
15	November 11	Edmonton Oilers	1–6	Boston Bruins		Markkanen	11,123	4–7–3–1	12	L
16	November 12	Edmonton Oilers	3–2	Minnesota Wild		Salo	18,064	5–7–3–1	14	W
17	November 15	St. Louis Blues	0–5	Edmonton Oilers		Salo	16,301	6–7–3–1	16	W
18	November 16	Los Angeles Kings	4–1	Edmonton Oilers		Salo	16,461	6–8–3–1	16	L
19	November 19	Chicago Blackhawks	1–3	Edmonton Oilers		Salo	16,033	7–8–3–1	18	W
20	November 21	Edmonton Oilers	3–1	Calgary Flames		Salo	17,660	8–8–3–1	20	W
21	November 23	Detroit Red Wings	1–1	Edmonton Oilers	OT	Salo	16,839	8–8–4–1	21	T
22	November 25	Edmonton Oilers	5–4	Detroit Red Wings	OT	Markkanen	20,058	9–8–4–1	23	W
23	November 27	Edmonton Oilers	3–1	Columbus Blue Jackets		Salo	17,745	10–8–4–1	25	W
24	November 30	Colorado Avalanche	0–1	Edmonton Oilers		Salo	16,839	11–8–4–1	27	W

December: 6–5–0–3 (home: 4–2–0–0; road: 2–3–0–3)

Game	Date	Visitor	Score	Home	OT	Decision	Attendance	Record	Pts	Recap
25	December 3	Minnesota Wild	1–2	Edmonton Oilers	OT	Salo	15,527	12–8–4–1	29	W
26	December 5	Edmonton Oilers	2–3	Tampa Bay Lightning		Salo	13,454	12–9–4–1	29	L
27	December 7	Edmonton Oilers	4–0	Florida Panthers		Markkanen	14,144	13–9–4–1	31	W
28	December 8	Edmonton Oilers	3–0	Atlanta Thrashers		Salo	12,179	14–9–4–1	33	W
29	December 11	Carolina Hurricanes	1–4	Edmonton Oilers		Salo	16,091	15–9–4–1	35	W
30	December 13	Colorado Avalanche	3–4	Edmonton Oilers	OT	Salo	16,839	16–9–4–1	37	W
31	December 14	Vancouver Canucks	6–3	Edmonton Oilers		Salo	16,839	16–10–4–1	37	L
32	December 17	Edmonton Oilers	3–4	Minnesota Wild	OT	Markkanen	18,568	16–10–4–2	38	OTL
33	December 19	Edmonton Oilers	1–2	Colorado Avalanche		Salo	18,007	16–11–4–2	38	L
34	December 21	Edmonton Oilers	3–4	Vancouver Canucks	OT	Salo	18,422	16–11–4–3	39	OTL
35	December 26	Vancouver Canucks	4–2	Edmonton Oilers		Salo	16,839	16–12–4–3	39	L
36	December 28	Toronto Maple Leafs	2–3	Edmonton Oilers	OT	Salo	16,839	17–12–4–3	41	W
37	December 30	Edmonton Oilers	3–4	Phoenix Coyotes	OT	Salo	15,589	17–12–4–4	42	OTL
38	December 31	Edmonton Oilers	1–4	Dallas Stars		Markkanen	18,532	17–13–4–4	42	L

January: 7–3–2–2 (home: 5–2–0–2; road: 2–1–2–0)

Game	Date	Visitor	Score	Home	OT	Decision	Attendance	Record	Pts	Recap
39	January 2	Minnesota Wild	2–1	Edmonton Oilers	OT	Salo	16,839	17–13–4–5	43	OTL
40	January 4	Montreal Canadiens	4–5	Edmonton Oilers	OT	Salo	16,839	18–13–4–5	45	W
41	January 6	Edmonton Oilers	5–5	San Jose Sharks	OT	Salo	16,648	18–13–5–5	46	T
42	January 8	Edmonton Oilers	1–0	Mighty Ducks of Anaheim		Markkanen	12,390	19–13–5–5	48	W
43	January 9	Edmonton Oilers	5–4	Los Angeles Kings		Salo	15,783	20–13–5–5	50	W
44	January 11	Ottawa Senators	2–0	Edmonton Oilers		Salo	16,839	20–14–5–5	50	L
45	January 13	Columbus Blue Jackets	5–8	Edmonton Oilers		Salo	16,057	21–14–5–5	52	W
46	January 16	Los Angeles Kings	0–2	Edmonton Oilers		Salo	16,839	22–14–5–5	54	W
47	January 18	Nashville Predators	3–2	Edmonton Oilers	OT	Markkanen	16,839	22–14–5–6	55	OTL
48	January 20	Edmonton Oilers	3–4	Calgary Flames		Salo	17,832	22–15–5–6	55	L
49	January 22	Detroit Red Wings	3–4	Edmonton Oilers	OT	Markkanen	16,839	23–15–5–6	57	W
50	January 24	Phoenix Coyotes	5–1	Edmonton Oilers		Salo	16,839	23–16–5–6	57	L
51	January 29	Minnesota Wild	1–5	Edmonton Oilers		Salo	16,469	24–16–5–6	59	W
52	January 30	Edmonton Oilers	3–3	Vancouver Canucks	OT	Salo	18,422	24–16–6–6	60	T

February: 2–7–1–2 (home: 1–2–1–1; road: 1–5–0–1)

Game	Date	Visitor	Score	Home	OT	Decision	Attendance	Record	Pts	Recap
53	February 5	Mighty Ducks of Anaheim	1–2	Edmonton Oilers		Salo	16,839	25–16–6–6	62	W
54	February 7	Calgary Flames	4–3	Edmonton Oilers		Markkanen	16,839	25–17–6–6	62	L
55	February 8	Chicago Blackhawks	3–0	Edmonton Oilers		Salo	16,839	25–18–6–6	62	L
56	February 11	Edmonton Oilers	5–4	Toronto Maple Leafs		Salo	19,399	26–18–6–6	64	W
57	February 13	Edmonton Oilers	0–2	Ottawa Senators		Salo	18,115	26–19–6–6	64	L
58	February 15	Edmonton Oilers	2–3	Montreal Canadiens		Salo	21,273	26–20–6–6	64	L
59	February 18	Edmonton Oilers	3–4	Pittsburgh Penguins	OT	Salo	13,552	26–20–6–7	65	OTL
60	February 20	Edmonton Oilers	2–6	Detroit Red Wings		Salo	20,058	26–21–6–7	65	L
61	February 22	Vancouver Canucks	3–2	Edmonton Oilers	OT	Salo	16,839	26–21–6–8	66	OTL
62	February 23	Atlanta Thrashers	3–3	Edmonton Oilers	OT	Salo	16,839	26–21–7–8	67	T
63	February 25	Edmonton Oilers	2–4	Colorado Avalanche		Salo	18,007	26–22–7–8	67	L
64	February 27	Edmonton Oilers	1–4	St. Louis Blues		Markkanen	19,255	26–23–7–8	67	L

March: 10–2–3–1 (home: 6–2–0–0; road: 4–0–3–1)

Game	Date	Visitor	Score	Home	OT	Decision	Attendance	Record	Pts	Recap
65	March 1	Edmonton Oilers	3–3	Columbus Blue Jackets	OT	Markkanen	18,136	26–23–8–8	68	T
66	March 4	San Jose Sharks	1–2	Edmonton Oilers		Salo	16,839	27–23–8–8	70	W
67	March 6	Edmonton Oilers	2–1	Los Angeles Kings		Salo	18,118	28–23–8–8	72	W
68	March 7	Edmonton Oilers	4–1	Mighty Ducks of Anaheim		Salo	15,818	29–23–8–8	74	W
69	March 10	Toronto Maple Leafs	3–2	Edmonton Oilers		Salo	16,839	29–24–8–8	74	L
70	March 11	Edmonton Oilers	5–2	Calgary Flames		Salo	17,714	30–24–8–8	76	W
71	March 13	New York Islanders	5–2	Edmonton Oilers		Salo	16,839	30–25–8–8	76	L
72	March 15	Dallas Stars	3–4	Edmonton Oilers		Salo	16,839	31–25–8–8	78	W
73	March 17	Edmonton Oilers	5–3	Nashville Predators		Salo	15,334	32–25–8–8	80	W
74	March 20	Edmonton Oilers	2–3	Phoenix Coyotes	OT	Salo	13,221	32–25–8–9	81	OTL
75	March 22	Washington Capitals	3–5	Edmonton Oilers		Salo	16,839	33–25–8–9	83	W
76	March 23	Nashville Predators	2–3	Edmonton Oilers	OT	Salo	16,839	34–25–8–9	85	W
77	March 26	Phoenix Coyotes	3–4	Edmonton Oilers		Salo	16,839	35–25–8–9	87	W
78	March 28	Columbus Blue Jackets	0–4	Edmonton Oilers		Markkanen	16,839	36–25–8–9	89	W
79	March 30	Edmonton Oilers	4–4	Chicago Blackhawks	OT	Salo	14,592	36–25–9–9	90	T
80	March 31	Edmonton Oilers	5–5	St. Louis Blues	OT	Markkanen	18,503	36–25–10–9	91	T

April: 0–1–1–0 (home: 0–1–1–0; road: 0–0–0–0)

Game	Date	Visitor	Score	Home	OT	Decision	Attendance	Record	Pts	Recap
81	April 3	San Jose Sharks	3–3	Edmonton Oilers	OT	Markkanen	16,839	36–25–11–9	92	T
82	April 5	Calgary Flames	4–1	Edmonton Oilers		Salo	16,839	36–26–11–9	92	L

Legend: W Win (2 points) L Loss (0 points) T Tie (1 point) OTL Overtime loss (1 point)

=== Playoffs ===
2003 Stanley Cup playoffs
Western Conference Quarterfinals vs. (1) Dallas Stars – Stars win 4–2

Game	Date	Visitor	Score	Home	OT	Decision	Attendance	Series	Recap
1	April 9	Edmonton Oilers	2–1	Dallas Stars		Salo	18,532	1–0	W
2	April 11	Edmonton Oilers	1–6	Dallas Stars		Salo	18,532	1–1	L
3	April 13	Dallas Stars	2–3	Edmonton Oilers		Salo	16,839	2–1	W
4	April 15	Dallas Stars	3–1	Edmonton Oilers		Salo	16,839	2–2	L
5	April 17	Edmonton Oilers	2–5	Dallas Stars		Salo	18,532	2–3	L
6	April 19	Dallas Stars	3–2	Edmonton Oilers		Salo	16,839	2–4	L

Legend: W Win L Loss

== Player statistics ==
=== Scoring ===
- Position abbreviations: C = Centre; D = Defence; G = Goaltender; LW = Left wing; RW = Right wing
- † = Joined team via a transaction (e.g., trade, waivers, signing) during the season. Stats reflect time with the Oilers only.
- ‡ = Left team via a transaction (e.g., trade, waivers, release) during the season. Stats reflect time with the Oilers only.

No.	Player	Pos	Regular season						Playoffs					
No.	Player	Pos	GP	G	A	Pts	+/-	PIM	GP	G	A	Pts	+/-	PIM
94	Ryan Smyth	LW	66	27	34	61	5	67	6	2	0	2	−1	16
26	Todd Marchant	LW	77	20	40	60	13	48	6	0	2	2	−1	2
22	Anson Carter‡	C	68	25	30	55	−11	20	—	—	—	—	—	—
16	Mike York	C	71	22	29	51	−8	10	6	0	2	2	2	2
89	Mike Comrie	C	69	20	31	51	−18	90	6	1	0	1	−1	10
10	Shawn Horcoff	C	78	12	21	33	10	55	6	3	1	4	1	6
18	Ethan Moreau	LW	78	14	17	31	−7	112	6	0	1	1	−4	16
19	Marty Reasoner	C	70	11	20	31	19	28	6	1	0	1	−2	2
83	Ales Hemsky	RW	59	6	24	30	5	14	6	0	0	0	−5	0
2	Eric Brewer	D	80	8	21	29	−11	45	6	1	3	4	1	6
44	Janne Niinimaa‡	D	63	4	24	28	−7	66	—	—	—	—	—	—
24	Steve Staios	RW	76	5	21	26	13	96	6	0	0	0	0	4
28	Jason Chimera	LW	66	14	9	23	−2	36	2	0	2	2	2	0
7	Daniel Cleary	RW	57	4	13	17	5	31	—	—	—	—	—	—
34	Fernando Pisani	RW	35	8	5	13	9	10	6	1	0	1	−2	2
27	Georges Laraque	LW	64	6	7	13	−4	110	6	1	3	4	2	4
21	Jason Smith	D	68	4	8	12	5	64	6	0	0	0	−2	19
37	Brian Swanson	C	44	2	10	12	−7	10	—	—	—	—	—	—
20	Radek Dvorak†	RW	12	4	4	8	−3	14	4	1	0	1	0	0
32	Scott Ferguson	D	78	3	5	8	11	120	5	0	0	0	0	8
5	Alexei Semenov	D	46	1	6	7	−7	58	6	0	0	0	−1	0
33	Jiri Dopita‡	C	21	1	5	6	−4	11	—	—	—	—	—	—
15	Brad Isbister†	LW	13	3	2	5	0	9	6	0	1	1	−1	12
23	Cory Cross†	D	11	2	3	5	3	8	6	0	1	1	−3	20
14	Jani Rita	LW	12	3	1	4	2	0	—	—	—	—	—	—
8	Ales Pisa‡	D	48	1	3	4	11	24	—	—	—	—	—	—
47 (Note: Bergeron wore number 20 in his first game.)	Marc-Andre Bergeron	D	5	1	1	2	2	9	1	0	1	1	−1	0
12	Josh Green‡	C	20	0	2	2	−3	12	—	—	—	—	—	—
36	Jarret Stoll	C	4	0	1	1	−3	0	—	—	—	—	—	—
30	Jussi Markkanen	G	22	0	1	1		2	1	0	0	0		0
12	Bobby Allen	D	1	0	0	0	0	0	—	—	—	—	—	—
55	Alex Henry‡	D	3	0	0	0	−1	0	—	—	—	—	—	—
29	Kari Haakana	D	13	0	0	0	−2	4	—	—	—	—	—	—
35	Tommy Salo	G	65	0	0	0		4	6	0	1	1		0

=== Goaltending ===
No.	Player	Regular season										Playoffs								
No.	Player	GP	W	L	T	SA	GA	GAA	SV%	SO	TOI	GP	W	L	SA	GA	GAA	SV%	SO	TOI
35	Tommy Salo	65	29	27	8	1708	172	2.71	.899	4	3814	6	2	4	161	18	3.15	.888	0	343
30	Jussi Markkanen	22	7	8	3	533	51	2.59	.904	3	1180	1	0	0	12	1	4.30	.917	0	14

== Awards and records ==
=== Awards ===
Type	Award/honour	Recipient	Ref
League (in-season)	NHL All-Star Game selection	Eric Brewer	
League (in-season)	NHL Player of the Week	Tommy Salo (March 10)	
League (in-season)	NHL Rookie of the Month	Ales Hemsky (March)	
League (in-season)	NHL YoungStars Game selection	Ales Hemsky (Note: Hemsky did not play and was replaced by Horcoff.)	
League (in-season)	NHL YoungStars Game selection	Shawn Horcoff	
Team	Community Service Award	Georges Laraque	
Team	Defenceman of the Year	Steve Staios	
Team	Molson Cup	Tommy Salo	
Team	Most Popular Player	Ryan Smyth	
Team	Top Defensive Forward	Todd Marchant	
Team	Top First Year Oiler	Ales Hemsky	
Team	Unsung Hero	Ethan Moreau	
Team	Zane Feldman Trophy	Todd Marchant	
Team	Zane Feldman Trophy	Tommy Salo	

=== Milestones ===
Regular season
Player	Milestone	Reached
Ales Hemsky	1st NHL game	October 10, 2002
Alex Henry	1st NHL game	October 10, 2002
Ales Hemsky	1st NHL assist 1st NHL point	October 12, 2002
Kari Haakana	1st NHL game	October 17, 2002
Steve Staios	600th NHL PIM	October 26, 2002
Jason Smith	100th NHL point	October 28, 2002
Ales Pisa	1st NHL assist 1st NHL point	November 3, 2002
Georges Laraque	300th NHL game	November 5, 2002
Ethan Moreau	2nd NHL Gordie Howe hat trick	November 9, 2002
Janne Niinimaa	500th NHL PIM	November 9, 2002
Mike Comrie	100th NHL point	November 15, 2002
Ryan Smyth	400th NHL PIM	November 16, 2002
Janne Niinimaa	500th NHL game	November 23, 2002
Steve Staios	400th NHL game	November 23, 2002
Scott Ferguson	100th NHL PIM	November 27, 2002
Jason Smith	600th NHL game	December 5, 2002
Anson Carter	400th NHL game	December 7, 2002
Scott Ferguson	100th NHL game	December 7, 2002
Jason Chimera	1st NHL assist	December 8, 2002
Mike Comrie	100th NHL PIM	December 8, 2002
Alexei Semenov	1st NHL game	December 30, 2002
Bobby Allen	1st NHL game	December 31, 2002
Ales Hemsky	1st NHL goal	January 4, 2003
Fernando Pisani	1st NHL game	January 8, 2003
Georges Laraque	600th NHL PIM	January 13, 2003
Mike York	100th NHL assist	January 13, 2003
Fernando Pisani	1st NHL assist 1st NHL point	January 20, 2003
Alexei Semenov	1st NHL assist 1st NHL point	January 20, 2003
Jani Rita	1st NHL goal 1st NHL point	January 22, 2003
Jarret Stoll	1st NHL game 1st NHL assist 1st NHL point	January 29, 2003
Fernando Pisani	1st NHL goal	February 5, 2003
Alexei Semenov	1st NHL goal	February 7, 2003
Eric Brewer	300th NHL game	February 8, 2003
Ethan Moreau	600th NHL PIM; 500th NHL game	February 13, 2003
Anson Carter	300th NHL point	February 18, 2003
Jani Rita	1st NHL assist	February 18, 2003
Mike York	300th NHL game	February 20, 2003
Ales Pisa	1st NHL goal	February 22, 2003
Marty Reasoner	100th NHL PIM	February 22, 2003
Todd Marchant	200th NHL assist	February 23, 2003
Marty Reasoner	200th NHL game	February 27, 2003
Marc-Andre Bergeron	1st NHL game	March 11, 2003
Fernando Pisani	1st NHL hat-trick	March 22, 2003
Cory Cross	100th NHL point	March 26, 2003
Scott Ferguson	1st NHL Gordie Howe hat trick	March 26, 2003
Radek Dvorak	600th NHL game	March 28, 2003
Marc-Andre Bergeron	1st NHL goal 1st NHL point	March 31, 2003
Marc-Andre Bergeron	1st NHL assist	April 5, 2003
Scott Ferguson	100th NHL game	April 5, 2003
Jussi Markkanen	1st NHL assist 1st NHL point	TBD

Playoffs
Player	Milestone	Reached
Ales Hemsky	1st NHL game	April 9, 2003
Fernando Pisani	1st NHL game	April 9, 2003
Alexei Semenov	1st NHL game	April 9, 2003
Mike York	1st NHL game	April 9, 2003
Shawn Horcoff	1st NHL goal 1st NHL point	April 9, 2003
Cory Cross	50th NHL PIM	April 11, 2003
Ryan Smyth	50th NHL PIM	April 11, 2003
Jussi Markkanen	1st NHL game	April 11, 2003
Fernando Pisani	1st NHL goal 1st NHL point	April 13, 2003
Tommy Salo	1st NHL assist 1st NHL point	April 13, 2003
Mike York	1st NHL assist 1st NHL point	April 13, 2003
Jason Chimera	1st NHL game 1st NHL assist 1st NHL point	April 17, 2003
Shawn Horcoff	1st NHL assist	April 17, 2003
Marc-Andre Bergeron	1st NHL game 1st NHL assist 1st NHL point	April 19, 2003

== Transactions ==
The Oilers were involved in the following transactions from June 14, 2002, the day after the deciding game of the 2002 Stanley Cup Finals, through June 9, 2003, the day of the deciding game of the 2003 Stanley Cup Finals.

=== Trades ===
Date	Details		Ref
June 18, 2002	To Philadelphia Flyers: 3rd-round pick in 2003; Conditional 5th-round pick in 2004 (Note: Condition not met. The Flyers would have received the Oilers' 2004 fifth-round pick if Dopita re-signed with Edmonton for the 2003–04 season.)	To Edmonton Oilers: Jiri Dopita	
June 22, 2002	To Montreal Canadiens: 1st-round pick in 2002	To Edmonton Oilers: 1st-round pick in 2002; 8th-round pick in 2002	
June 22, 2002	To Buffalo Sabres: Jochen Hecht	To Edmonton Oilers: Atlanta’s 2nd-round pick in 2002; Nashville’s 2nd-round pick in 2002	
June 30, 2002	To New York Rangers: 4th-round pick in 2003	To Edmonton Oilers: Rights to Mike Richter	
October 7, 2002	To Washington Capitals: Mike Grier	To Edmonton Oilers: 2nd-round pick in 2003; Vancouver’s 3rd-round pick in 2003	
December 12, 2002	To New York Rangers: Josh Green	To Edmonton Oilers: Conditional draft pick in 2004	
January 17, 2003 (Note: Compensation due to Montreal hiring Julien as their head coach.)	To Montreal Canadiens: Claude Julien	To Edmonton Oilers: Conditional 5th-round pick in 2003 (Note: The pick would have improved to a 4th-rounder if Montreal had made the 2003 Stanley Cup playoffs.)	
March 11, 2003	To New York Islanders: Janne Niinimaa; 2nd-round pick in 2003	To Edmonton Oilers: Brad Isbister; Raffi Torres	
March 11, 2003	To New York Rangers: Anson Carter; Ales Pisa	To Edmonton Oilers: Cory Cross; Radek Dvorak	

=== Players acquired ===
Date	Player	Former team	Term	Via	Ref
August 19, 2002	J. J. Hunter	Columbus Cottonmouths (ECHL)	2-year	Free agency	

=== Players lost ===
Date	Player	New team	Via (Note: In parentheses is the player's free agency group on July 1 if applicable.)	Ref
July 4, 2002	Mike Richter	New York Rangers	Free agency (III)	
July 9, 2002	Sven Butenschon	Florida Panthers	Free agency (VI)	
July 23, 2002	Alexander Fomichev	Amur Khabarovsk (RSL)	Free agency (UFA)	
July 23, 2002	Chris Hajt	Washington Capitals	Free agency (UFA)	
July 24, 2002	Greg Leeb	Augsburger Panther (DEL)	Free agency (VI)	
July 24, 2002	Domenic Pittis	Nashville Predators	Free agency (UFA)	
August 5, 2002	Marc Lamothe	Detroit Red Wings	Free agency (UFA)	
August 22, 2002	Kevin McDonald	Hartford Wolf Pack (AHL)	Free agency (UFA)	
September 6, 2002	Alain Nasreddine	New York Islanders	Free agency (VI)	
October 11, 2002	Peter Sarno	Espoo Blues (Liiga)	Free agency (II) (Note: Edmonton retained Sarno’s NHL rights and re-signed him on September 2, 2003.)	
October 24, 2002	Alex Henry	Washington Capitals	Waivers	
December 28, 2002	Jiri Dopita	HC Olomouc (CZE-1) (Note: Dopita signed with HC Olomouc on February 3, 2003.)	Release	

=== Signings ===
Date	Player	Term	Contract type	Ref
July 15, 2002	Kristian Antila	2-year	Entry-level	
July 15, 2002	Kari Haakana	1-year	Re-signing	
July 15, 2002	Todd Marchant	1-year	Re-signing	
July 15, 2002	Ales Pisa	1-year	Re-signing	
July 27, 2002	Scott Ferguson	2-year	Re-signing	
July 30, 2002	Mike Grier	1-year	Re-signing	
July 30, 2002	Alex Henry	1-year	Re-signing	
August 2, 2002	Jason Chimera	2-year	Re-signing	
August 2, 2002	Josh Green	1-year	Re-signing	
August 5, 2002	Anson Carter	1-year	Re-signing	
August 12, 2002	Jason Smith	1-year	Arbitration award	
August 19, 2002	Mike Morrison	2-year	Entry-level	
September 3, 2002	Jarret Stoll	3-year	Entry-level	
September 4, 2002	Fernando Pisani	1-year	Re-signing	
September 9, 2002	Mike York	3-year	Re-signing	
September 12, 2002	Eric Brewer	2-year	Re-signing	
September 25, 2002	Ales Hemsky	3-year	Entry-level	
May 28, 2003	Dan Baum	3-year	Entry-level	
May 28, 2003	Doug Lynch	3-year	Entry-level	

== Draft picks ==
Edmonton's draft picks at the 2002 NHL entry draft at the Air Canada Centre in Toronto, Ontario. The Oilers selection of Robin Kovar at 123rd overall in the fourth round was ruled invalid since Kovar wasn’t eligible for the draft.

Round	#	Player	Nationality	College/Junior/Club team (League)
1	15	Jesse Niinimaki	Finland	Ilves (SM-liiga)
2	31	Jeff Deslauriers	Canada	Chicoutimi Sagueneens (QMJHL)
2	36	Jarret Stoll	Canada	Kootenay Ice (WHL)
2	44	Matt Greene	United States	Green Bay Gamblers (USHL)
3	79	Brock Radunske	Canada	Michigan State University (NCAA)
4	106	Ivan Koltsov	Russia	Severstal Cherepovets (RSL)
4	111	Jonas Almtorp	Sweden	Modo Hockey (Elitserien)
4	123	Robin Kovar	Czech Republic	HC Vsetin (Czech Extraliga)
5	148	Glenn Fisher	Canada	Fort Saskatchewan Traders (AJHL)
6	181	Mikko Luoma	Finland	Tappara (SM-liiga)
7	205	Jean-Francois Dufort	Canada	Cape Breton Screaming Eagles (QMJHL)
7	211	Patrick Murphy	Canada	Newmarket Hurricanes (OPJHL)
8	244	Dwight Helminen	United States	University of Michigan (NCAA)
8	245	Tomas Micka	Czech Republic	Slavia Praha (Czech Extraliga)
9	274	Fredrik Johansson	Sweden	Frolunda HC (Elitserien)
