= 1992 NHL supplemental draft =

Player selection draft

General information
- Date(s): June 19, 1992

Overview
- 8 total selections in 1 rounds
- First selection: (Canada) Cory Cross (Tampa Bay Lightning)

The 1992 NHL supplemental draft was the seventh NHL supplemental draft. It was held on June 19, 1992. The supplemental draft was shortened to a single round in 1992 and limited to the six teams that missed the 1992 Stanley Cup playoffs and the expansion Ottawa Senators and Tampa Bay Lightning.

== Selections ==
Pick #	Player	Nationality	NHL team	College (league)
1	Cory Cross (D)	Canada	Tampa Bay Lightning	University of Alberta (CWUAA)
2	Steve Flomenhoft (C)	United States	Ottawa Senators	Harvard University (ECAC)
3	Brian Konowalchuk (C)	United States	San Jose Sharks	University of Denver (WCHA)
4	Richard Shulmistra (G)	Canada	Quebec Nordiques	Miami University (CCHA)
5	Nick Wohlers (D)	Canada	Toronto Maple Leafs	St. Thomas University (AUAA)
6	Jamie O'Brien (D)	United States	Calgary Flames	Brown University (ECAC)
7	Garett MacDonald (D)	Canada	Philadelphia Flyers	Northern Michigan University (WCHA)
8	Chris Foy (D)	Canada	New York Islanders	Northeastern University (Hockey East)

== See also ==
- 1992 NHL entry draft
- 1992 NHL expansion draft
- 1992–93 NHL season
- List of NHL players
