= Tomáš Micka =

Czech ice hockey player

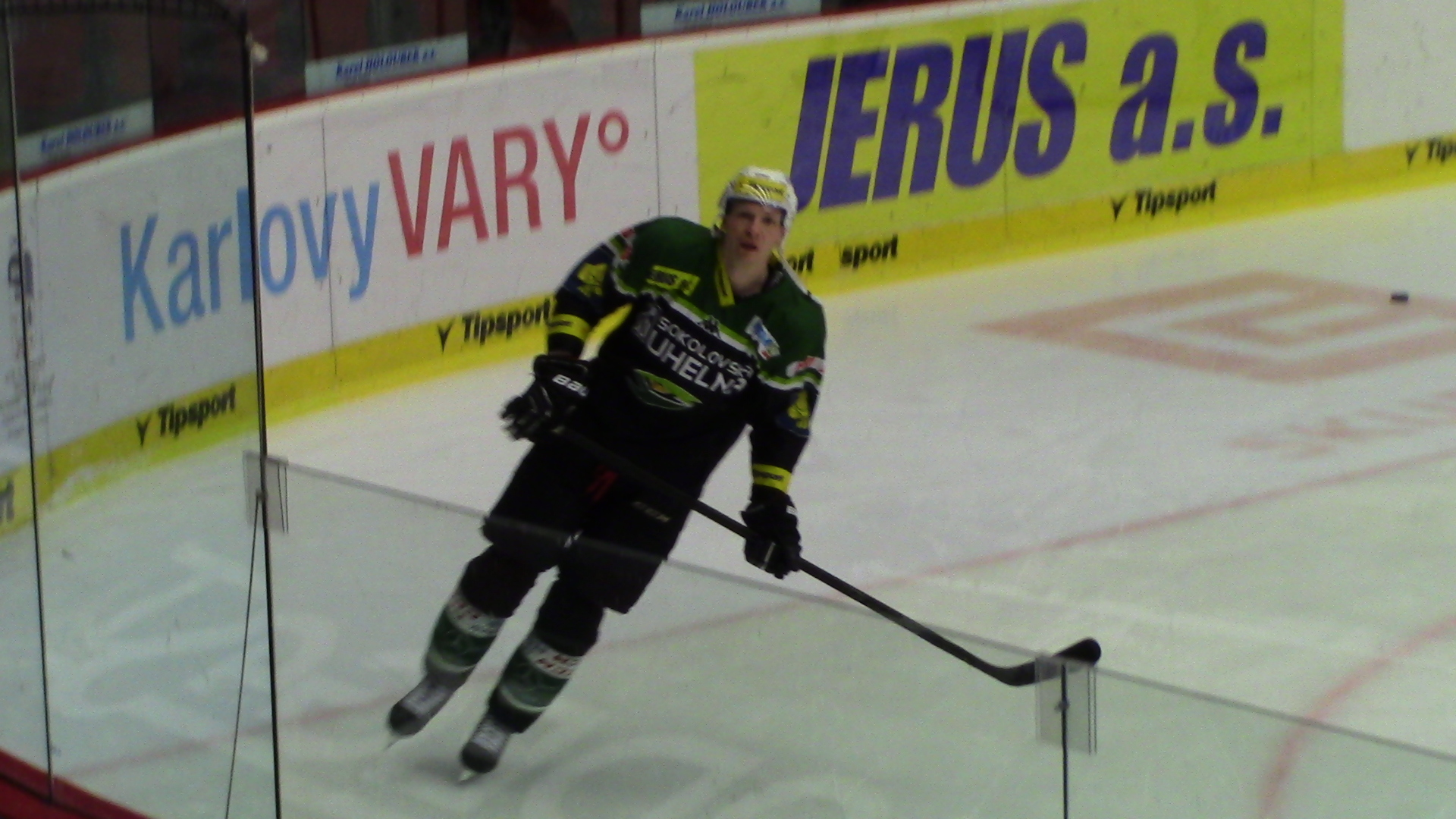
- Tomáš Micka
- Born: June 7, 1983 (age 42) Jihlava, Czechoslovakia
- Height: 6 ft 4 in (193 cm)
- Weight: 229 lb (104 kg; 16 st 5 lb)
- Position: Forward
- Shot: Left
- Played for: HC Slavia Praha; HC Havlíčkův Brod; HC Havirov; Columbus Cottonmouths; Toledo Storm; Victoria Salmon Kings; Greenville Grrrowl; HC Zdar nad Sazavou; HK Dukla Trencin; HK 95 Povazska Bystrica; HC Berounsti Medvedi; HC Ceske Budejovice; HC Karlovy Vary
- National team: Czech Republic
- NHL draft: 245th overall, 2002; Edmonton Oilers
- Playing career: 2004–2016

Tomáš Micka (born 7 June 1983) is a Czech former professional ice hockey forward who last played for HC Slavia Praha of the Czech second-tier league. He was selected by the Edmonton Oilers in the 8th round (245th overall) of the 2002 NHL entry draft.

Micka previously played for HC Havířov, Columbus Cottonmouths, Toledo Storm, HK Dukla Trenčín, HC Slovan Ústečtí Lvi and HC České Budějovice. In 2019 he became a referee in the Czech Extraliga.

== Career statistics ==
=== Regular season and playoffs ===
			Regular season					Playoffs
Season	Team	League	GP	G	A	Pts	PIM	GP	G	A	Pts	PIM
1999–2000	HC Slavia Praha	CZE U18	42	17	18	35	24	—	—	—	—	—
2000–01	HC Slavia Praha	CZE U20	45	2	8	10	65	3	0	1	1	0
2001–02	HC Slavia Praha	CZE U20	46	12	16	28	79	—	—	—	—	—
2001–02	HC Slavia Praha	ELH	1	0	0	0	0	—	—	—	—	—
2002–03	HC Havířov Panthers	CZE U20	27	8	9	17	41	—	—	—	—	—
2002–03	HC Havířov Panthers	ELH	23	1	0	1	12	—	—	—	—	—
2002–03	HC Senators Žďár nad Sázavou	CZE.2	4	1	0	1	2	—	—	—	—	—
2003–04	Columbus Cottonmouths	ECHL	67	17	15	32	52	—	—	—	—	—
2004–05	Greenville Grrrowl	ECHL	9	1	3	4	2	—	—	—	—	—
2004–05	Toledo Storm	ECHL	40	8	6	14	37	—	—	—	—	—
2004–05	Victoria Salmon Kings	ECHL	6	0	1	1	10	—	—	—	—	—
2005–06	Dukla Trenčín	SVK	48	5	7	12	44	4	1	0	1	0
2005–06	HK 95 Považská Bystrica	SVK.2	3	4	0	4	4	—	—	—	—	—
2006–07	Dukla Trenčín	SVK	15	2	1	3	43	—	—	—	—	—
2006–07	HK 95 Považská Bystrica	SVK.2	1	1	0	1	0	—	—	—	—	—
2006–07	HC Slovan Ústečtí Lvi	CZE.2	28	14	8	22	59	12	5	9	14	18
2007–08	HC Slavia Praha	ELH	49	19	6	25	32	19	4	1	5	38
2008–09	HC Slavia Praha	ELH	50	13	8	21	28	18	5	1	6	14
2009–10	HC Slavia Praha	ELH	13	0	0	0	35	—	—	—	—	—
2009–10	HC Mountfield	ELH	25	6	2	8	20	5	0	1	1	2
2009–10	HC Rebel Havlíčkův Brod	CZE.2	1	1	1	2	2	—	—	—	—	—
2010–11	HC Slavia Praha	ELH	51	11	12	23	75	19	2	6	8	24
2010–11	HC Rebel Havlíčkův Brod	CZE.2	2	1	1	2	0	—	—	—	—	—
2011–12	HC Slavia Praha	ELH	41	8	5	13	22	—	—	—	—	—
2011–12	HC Medvědi Beroun 1933	CZE.2	4	2	0	2	0	—	—	—	—	—
2012–13	HC Slavia Praha	ELH	40	4	6	10	47	11	1	0	1	0
2012–13	HC Rebel Havlíčkův Brod	CZE.2	4	1	2	3	2	—	—	—	—	—
2013–14	HC Slavia Praha	ELH	23	1	2	3	8	—	—	—	—	—
2013–14	HC Energie Karlovy Vary	ELH	27	6	6	12	6	—	—	—	—	—
2014–15	HC Slavia Praha	ELH	10	1	0	1	35	—	—	—	—	—
2014–15	HC Rebel Havlíčkův Brod	CZE.2	4	0	1	1	2	—	—	—	—	—
2014–15	HC Energie Karlovy Vary	ELH	26	1	0	1	19	—	—	—	—	—
2015–16	HC Slavia Praha	CZE.2	34	8	12	20	24	1	0	0	0	0
ELH totals			379	71	47	118	336	72	12	9	21	78
ECHL totals			122	26	25	51	101	—	—	—	—	—

=== International ===
Year	Team	Event	GP	G	A	Pts	PIM
2001	Czech Republic	WJC18	7	1	2	3	0
2003	Czech Republic	WJC	6	0	0	0	0
Junior totals			13	1	2	3	0
