= Cory Cross =

Canadian ice hockey player (born 1971)

- Born: January 3, 1971 (age 55) Lloydminster, Alberta, Canada
- Height: 6 ft 5 in (196 cm)
- Weight: 219 lb (99 kg; 15 st 9 lb)
- Position: Defence
- Shot: Left
- Played for: Tampa Bay Lightning; Toronto Maple Leafs; New York Rangers; Edmonton Oilers; Pittsburgh Penguins; Detroit Red Wings; Hamburg Freezers
- National team: Canada
- NHL draft: 1992 NHL Supplemental Draft; Tampa Bay Lightning
- Playing career: 1993–2007

Cory Cross (born January 3, 1971) is a Canadian former professional ice hockey defenceman, who played twelve seasons in the National Hockey League (NHL).

== Draft ==
Cross was selected by the Tampa Bay Lightning first overall in the 1992 NHL Supplemental Draft.

== Playing career ==
After being drafted first overall in the 1992 Supplemental Draft by the Tampa Bay Lightning, Cross went on to spend 12 NHL seasons with the Toronto Maple Leafs, New York Rangers, Edmonton Oilers, Pittsburgh Penguins and Detroit Red Wings. He was a physically imposing player with a powerful shot.

After getting recruited from his hockey class at the University of Alberta, Cross spent three seasons with the University of Alberta, during which time they won three Canada West championships and one national championship in 1992. Cross made his professional debut with the Atlanta Knights of the IHL in the 1993-1994 season. The Knights won the Turner Cup championship, only losing 2 games in the playoffs. He was called up to the parent club Tampa Bay Lightning for the last five games of the 93-94 season. Despite making the Lightning after the 94-95 exhibition season, he returned to the Knights during the NHL lockout. At the end of the lockout, Cross was called up to the Lightning for the remainder of the season.

After spending five full seasons in Tampa Bay, Cross, along with a seventh-round draft pick, was dealt in the off-season to the Toronto Maple Leafs in exchange for Fredrik Modin. Cross scored one of the biggest goals of his career on April 16, 2001, when he potted the overtime game-winning goal for Toronto over the Ottawa Senators in Game 3 in the first round of the 2001 NHL Stanley Cup Playoffs on the way to an upset sweep of the number-two seeded Senators.

After three relatively good seasons with the Leafs, Cross was signed as an unrestricted free agent by the New York Rangers. Cross played only 26 games in New York before being traded again, this time along with Radek Dvorak to the Edmonton Oilers in exchange for Anson Carter and Ales Pisa. Cross played 113 games for Edmonton before being traded along with Jani Rita to the Pittsburgh Penguins for Dick Tarnstrom. On March 9, 2006, Cross was traded from the Penguins to the Detroit Red Wings for a fourth-round draft pick in 2007.

Cross signed with the Hamburg Freezers of the Deutsche Eishockey Liga in July 2006. Cross played one season with Hamburg and formally retired as an active player in September 2009.

== International play ==
Medal record

Representing Canada

World Championships
Gold medal – first place	1997 Finland	
Gold medal – first place	2003 Finland	

Cross was a member of Team Canada at three World Championships (1997, 1998, 2003), winning gold in 1997 and 2003.

== Coaching career ==
On September 27, 2009, the Calgary Dinos' head hockey coach Mark Howell announced that Cross would be an assistant head coach along with former NHL player Brad Isbister.

In 2016, Cross was an assistant coach with the West Kelowna Warriors, when they won the 2016 RBC Cup.

== Personal life ==
Cross was born in Lloydminster, Alberta, and now resides in West Kelowna, British Columbia, with his wife Shannon and their two children. Cross is part-owner of an oil and gas service company, R'ohan Well and Rig Services, and one of the co-founders of ProSmart Sports, an online hockey learning platform.

== Career statistics ==
=== Regular season and playoffs ===
			Regular season					Playoffs
Season	Team	League	GP	G	A	Pts	PIM	GP	G	A	Pts	PIM
1990–91	University of Alberta	CIAU	20	2	5	7	16	—	—	—	—	—
1991–92	University of Alberta	CIAU	41	4	11	15	82	—	—	—	—	—
1992–93	University of Alberta	CIAU	44	11	28	39	107	—	—	—	—	—
1992–93	Atlanta Knights	IHL	7	0	1	1	2	4	0	0	0	6
1993–94	Tampa Bay Lightning	NHL	5	0	0	0	6	—	—	—	—	—
1993–94	Atlanta Knights	IHL	70	4	14	18	72	9	1	2	3	14
1994–95	Tampa Bay Lightning	NHL	43	1	5	6	41	—	—	—	—	—
1994–95	Atlanta Knights	IHL	41	5	10	15	67	—	—	—	—	—
1995–96	Tampa Bay Lightning	NHL	75	2	14	16	66	6	0	0	0	22
1996–97	Tampa Bay Lightning	NHL	72	4	5	9	95	—	—	—	—	—
1997–98	Tampa Bay Lightning	NHL	74	3	6	9	77	—	—	—	—	—
1998–99	Tampa Bay Lightning	NHL	67	2	16	18	92	—	—	—	—	—
1999–2000	Toronto Maple Leafs	NHL	71	4	11	15	64	12	0	2	2	2
2000–01	Toronto Maple Leafs	NHL	41	3	5	8	50	11	2	1	3	10
2001–02	Toronto Maple Leafs	NHL	50	3	9	12	54	12	0	0	0	8
2002–03	Hartford Wolf Pack	AHL	2	0	0	0	2	—	—	—	—	—
2002–03	New York Rangers	NHL	26	0	4	4	16	—	—	—	—	—
2002–03	Edmonton Oilers	NHL	11	2	3	5	8	6	0	1	1	20
2003–04	Edmonton Oilers	NHL	68	7	14	21	56	—	—	—	—	—
2005–06	Edmonton Oilers	NHL	34	2	3	5	38	—	—	—	—	—
2005–06	Pittsburgh Penguins	NHL	6	0	1	1	6	—	—	—	—	—
2005–06	Detroit Red Wings	NHL	16	1	1	2	15	—	—	—	—	—
2006–07	Hamburg Freezers	DEL	48	2	7	9	190	7	2	2	4	32
NHL totals			659	34	97	131	684	47	2	4	6	62

=== International ===
Year	Team	Event	Results	GP	G	A	Pts	PIM
1997	Canada	WC	1st place, gold medalist(s)	11	0	2	2	49
1998	Canada	WC	6th	6	1	0	1	2
2003	Canada	WC	1st place, gold medalist(s)	8	1	2	3	4
Senior totals				25	2	4	6	55
