= Alex Henry =

Canadian ice hockey player (born 1979)

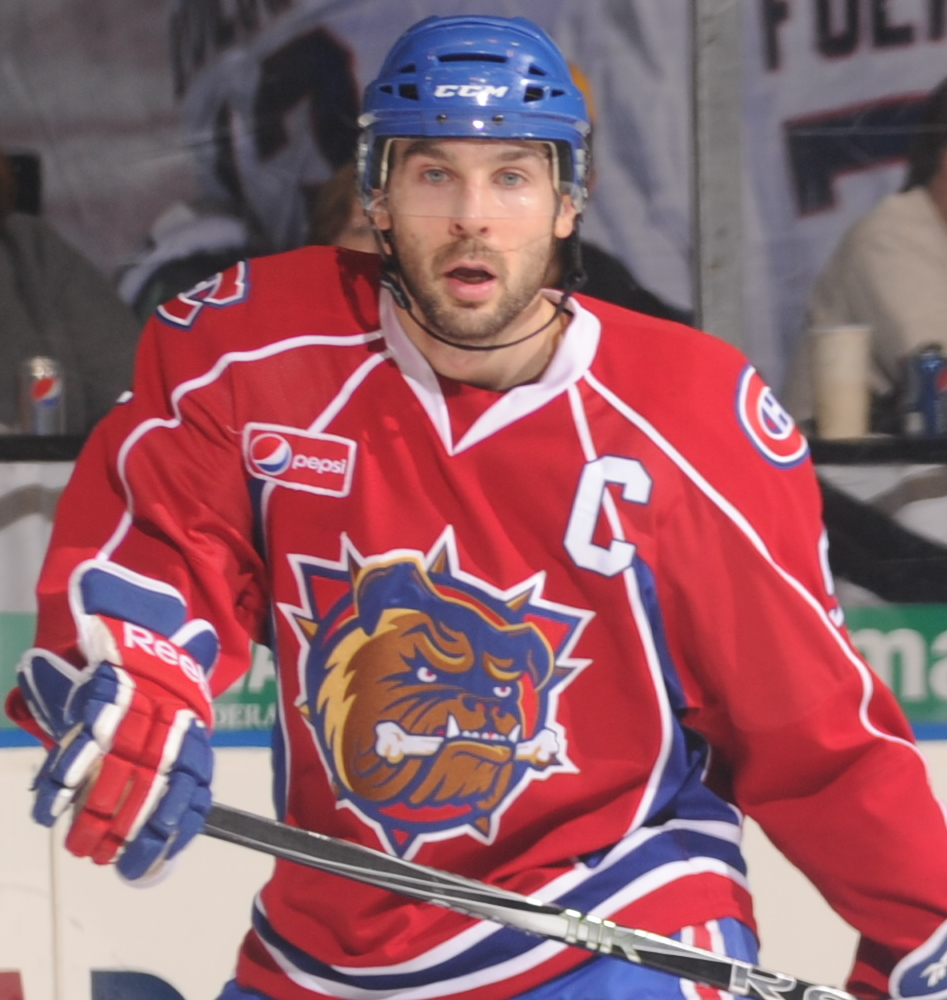
- Henry with the Hamilton Bulldogs in 2012
- Born: October 18, 1979 (age 46) Elliot Lake, Ontario, Canada
- Height: 6 ft 6 in (198 cm)
- Weight: 231 lb (105 kg; 16 st 7 lb)
- Position: Defence
- Shot: Left
- Played for: Edmonton Oilers; Washington Capitals; Minnesota Wild; Montreal Canadiens; Düsseldorfer EG; HYS The Hague
- NHL draft: 67th overall, 1998; Edmonton Oilers
- Playing career: 1999–2014

Alexander Lawrence Henry (born October 18, 1979) is a Canadian former professional ice hockey defenceman who most recently played for the Dutch team HYS The Hague from The Hague. He played 177 games in the NHL with the Edmonton Oilers, Washington Capitals, Minnesota Wild and Montreal Canadiens.

== Playing career ==
Henry was selected in the 3rd round, 67th overall, in the 1998 NHL entry draft by the Edmonton Oilers from the London Knights of the Ontario Hockey League. Henry played his first professional season in the 1999–00 season with the Hamilton Bulldogs of the AHL.

Henry made his NHL debut with the Oilers in the 2002–03 season, playing in only three games before he was placed on waivers to be claimed by the Washington Capitals on October 24, 2002. Henry went on to play 38 games with the Capitals.

On October 9, 2003, Henry was again placed on waivers, this time to be claimed by the Minnesota Wild. With Minnesota he played his first full season in the NHL with 71 games played. Henry signed with the German team ESV Kaufbeuren in the 2nd Bundesliga during the 2004–05 NHL lockout before returning to the Wild in the 2005–06 season.

On August 22, 2006, Henry was signed as a free agent by the Nashville Predators. He went on to play two season's with Predators affiliate, the Milwaukee Admirals.

On July 3, 2008, Henry was signed as a free agent by the Montreal Canadiens to a one-year contract, and played his first regular-season game with the Canadiens on February 1, 2009, against the Boston Bruins. It marked his first NHL game since the 2005–06 season.

On May 9, 2012 it was announced that Henry had signed a contract with the Düsseldorfer EG of the Deutsche Eishockey Liga. On October 9, 2013 it was announced that Henry had signed a one-year contract with HYS The Hague in the Dutch Eredivisie.

== Career statistics ==
			Regular season					Playoffs
Season	Team	League	GP	G	A	Pts	PIM	GP	G	A	Pts	PIM
1995–96	Timmins Majors	NOJHL	30	2	6	8	15	—	—	—	—	—
1995–96	Timmins Golden Bears	NOJHL	2	0	0	0	0	—	—	—	—	—
1996–97	London Knights	OHL	61	1	10	11	65	—	—	—	—	—
1997–98	London Knights	OHL	62	5	9	14	97	16	0	3	3	14
1998–99	London Knights	OHL	68	5	23	28	105	25	3	10	13	22
1999–00	Hamilton Bulldogs	AHL	60	1	0	1	69	—	—	—	—	—
2000–01	Hamilton Bulldogs	AHL	56	2	3	5	87	—	—	—	—	—
2001–02	Hamilton Bulldogs	AHL	69	4	8	12	143	15	1	2	3	16
2002–03	Edmonton Oilers	NHL	3	0	0	0	0	—	—	—	—	—
2002–03	Washington Capitals	NHL	38	0	0	0	80	—	—	—	—	—
2002–03	Portland Pirates	AHL	3	0	1	1	0	—	—	—	—	—
2003–04	Minnesota Wild	NHL	71	2	4	6	106	—	—	—	—	—
2004–05	ESV Kaufbeuren	2. GBun	16	4	4	8	20	—	—	—	—	—
2005–06	Minnesota Wild	NHL	63	0	5	5	73	—	—	—	—	—
2006–07	Milwaukee Admirals	AHL	64	1	6	7	66	2	0	0	0	7
2007–08	Milwaukee Admirals	AHL	80	3	13	16	142	6	0	1	1	10
2008–09	Hamilton Bulldogs	AHL	79	3	7	10	127	6	0	0	0	8
2008–09	Montreal Canadiens	NHL	2	0	0	0	10	—	—	—	—	—
2009–10	Hamilton Bulldogs	AHL	68	0	13	13	154	19	2	2	4	22
2010–11	Hamilton Bulldogs	AHL	80	1	13	14	96	20	0	3	3	34
2011–12	Hamilton Bulldogs	AHL	74	1	6	7	94	—	—	—	—	—
2012–13	Düsseldorfer EG	DEL	46	1	4	5	86	—	—	—	—	—
2013–14	HYS The Hague	Hlnd	31	5	16	21	30	—	—	—	—	—
NHL totals			177	2	9	11	269	—	—	—	—	—

Sporting positions
Preceded by Andrew Brunette	Minnesota Wild captain October 2005	Succeeded by Filip Kuba
