= Aleš Píša =

Czech ice hockey player

- Born: 2 January 1977 (age 49) Pardubice, Czechoslovakia
- Height: 5 ft 11 in (180 cm)
- Weight: 183 lb (83 kg; 13 st 1 lb)
- Position: Defence
- Shot: Right
- Played for: HC Pardubice; Torpedo Nizhny Novgorod; Khimik Mytishchi; Severstal Cherepovets; New York Rangers; Edmonton Oilers
- NHL draft: 272nd overall, 2001; Edmonton Oilers
- Playing career: 1993–2018

Aleš Píša (born 2 January 1977) is a Czech former professional ice hockey defenceman. He played 53 games in the National Hockey League with the Edmonton Oilers and New York Rangers during the 2001–02 and 2002–03 seasons. The rest of his career, which lasted from 1993 to 2018, was mainly spent in the Czech Extraliga. He was chosen as an over-age selection in the ninth round of the 2001 NHL entry draft, 272nd overall, by the Edmonton Oilers.

== Playing career ==
After spending most of his professional career with his hometown team of Pardubice, Píša made his North America debut with the Hamilton Bulldogs of the American Hockey League (AHL) in 2001. He saw spot duty with the Oilers his first year, playing in only two games, but the following season, he remained with the Oilers until the trade deadline. At the deadline, Píša was shipped to the New York Rangers as part of a package that brought back Radek Dvořák.

Píša played just three games for the Rangers to finish the year, and signed with Severstal Cherepovets of the Russian Superleague (RSL) in 2003–04, a team he remained with throughout the 2004–05 NHL lockout.

Píša played the 2005–06 season with Khimik Moscow Oblast of the RSL, and was one of the team's top players, leading all Mytishi Khimik defenceman in points.

== Career statistics ==
=== Regular season and playoffs ===
			Regular season					Playoffs
Season	Team	League	GP	G	A	Pts	PIM	GP	G	A	Pts	PIM
1991–92	HC Pardubice	TCH U18	29	8	14	22	—	—	—	—	—	—
1993–94	HC Pardubice	ELH	2	0	0	0	2	—	—	—	—	—
1994–95	HC Pardubice	ELH	22	0	0	0	16	—	—	—	—	—
1995–96	HC Pojišťovna IB Pardubice	ELH	34	0	4	4	78	—	—	—	—	—
1996–97	HC Pojišťovna IB Pardubice	ELH	41	4	2	6	70	6	0	2	2	6
1997–98	HC IPB Pojišťovna Pardubice	ELH	50	4	7	11	77	3	0	0	0	4
1998–99	HC IPB Pojišťovna Pardubice	ELH	48	7	12	19	79	3	0	1	1	6
1999–2000	HC IPB Pojišťovna Pardubice	ELH	51	5	11	16	74	1	0	0	0	4
2000–01	HC IPB Pojišťovna Pardubice	ELH	47	10	13	23	75	7	2	2	4	29
2001–02	Edmonton Oilers	NHL	2	0	0	0	2	—	—	—	—	—
2001–02	Hamilton Bulldogs	AHL	52	6	12	18	62	14	1	4	5	8
2002–03	Edmonton Oilers	NHL	48	1	3	4	24	—	—	—	—	—
2002–03	Hamilton Bulldogs	AHL	7	0	1	1	14	—	—	—	—	—
2002–03	New York Rangers	NHL	3	0	0	0	0	—	—	—	—	—
2003–04	Severstal Cherepovets	RSL	31	1	11	12	46	—	—	—	—	—
2004–05	Severstal Cherepovets	RSL	52	6	10	16	85	—	—	—	—	—
2005–06	Khimik Mytishchi	RSL	51	13	10	23	140	9	0	2	2	10
2006–07	HC Moeller Pardubice	ELH	30	5	6	11	122	14	1	5	6	58
2007–08	HC Moeller Pardubice	ELH	31	0	8	8	81	—	—	—	—	—
2007–08	Torpedo Nizhny Novgorod	RSL	20	0	1	1	30	—	—	—	—	—
2008–09	HC Moeller Pardubice	ELH	51	5	12	17	95	7	1	0	1	33
2009–10	HC Eaton Pardubice	ELH	44	5	15	20	40	13	6	8	14	16
2010–11	HC Eaton Pardubice	ELH	40	3	7	10	34	9	2	2	4	4
2011–12	HC ČSOB Pojišťovna Pardubice	ELH	46	7	17	24	61	17	4	8	12	26
2012–13	HC ČSOB Pojišťovna Pardubice	ELH	50	6	10	16	54	5	0	0	0	0
2013–14	HC ČSOB Pojišťovna Pardubice	ELH	47	0	7	7	58	10	0	0	0	10
2014–15	HC ČSOB Pojišťovna Pardubice	ELH	44	0	11	11	30	—	—	—	—	—
2015–16	HC BAK Trutnov	CZE-3	15	3	11	14	50	—	—	—	—	—
2016–17	HC BAK Trutnov	CZE-3	32	5	16	21	60	5	0	1	1	4
2017–18	HC BAK Trutnov	CZE-3	11	0	2	2	32	—	—	—	—	—
ELH totals			678	61	142	203	1046	95	16	28	44	196
NHL totals			53	1	3	4	26	—	—	—	—	—
RSL totals			154	20	32	52	301	9	0	2	2	10

=== International ===
Year	Team	Event	GP	G	A	Pts	PIM
1995	Czech Republic	EJC	5	0	1	1	2
1996	Czech Republic	WJC	6	0	1	1	33
1997	Czech Republic	WJC	7	0	1	1	2
Junior totals			18	0	3	3	37

== Transactions ==
- 24 June 2001 — Drafted by the Edmonton Oilers in the ninth round, 272nd overall.
- 11 March 2003 — Traded with Anson Carter to the New York Rangers in exchange for Radek Dvořák and Cory Cross.
