= Radek Dvořák =

Czech ice hockey player (born 1977)

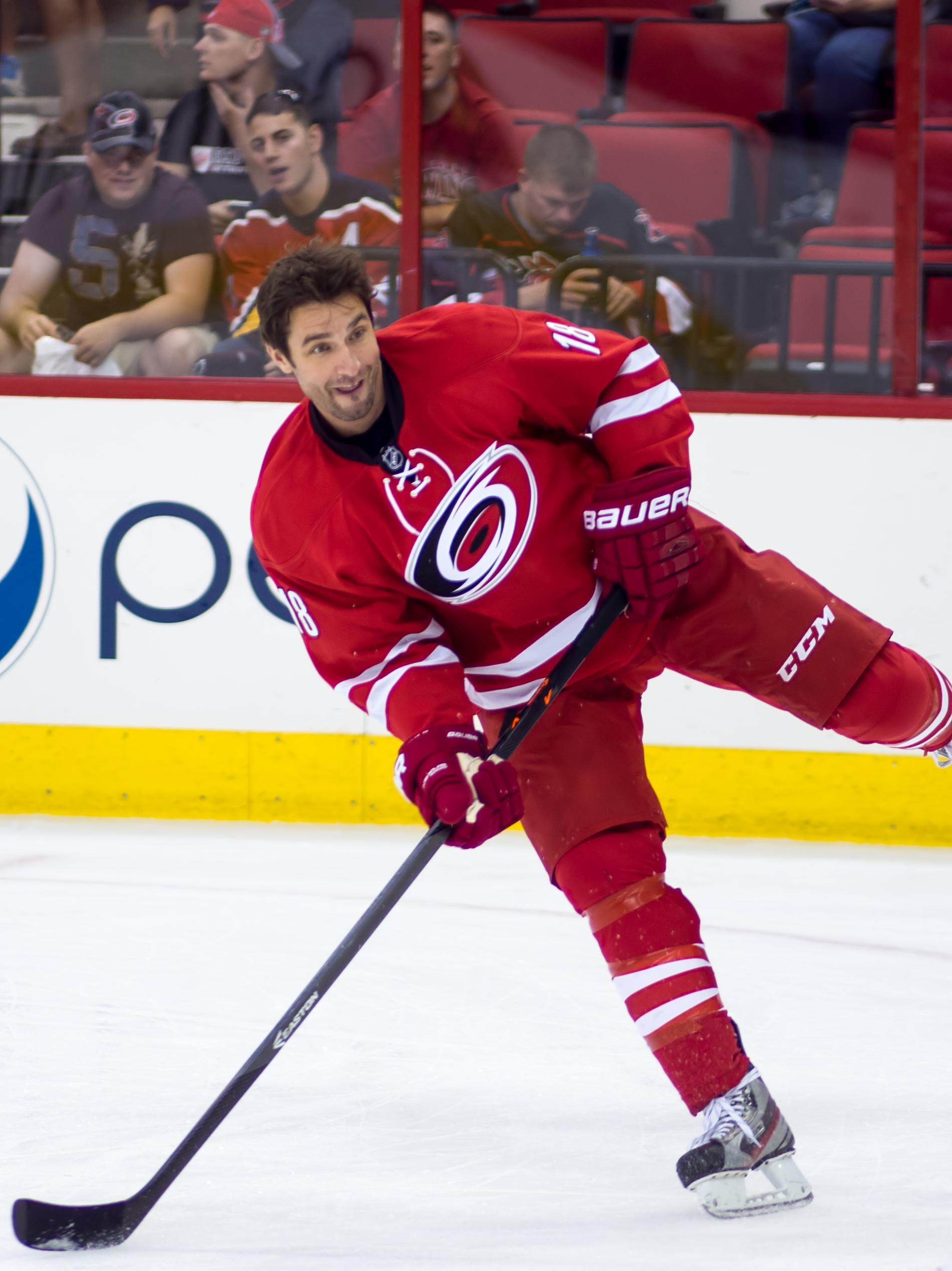
- Dvořák with the Carolina Hurricanes in 2013
- Born: March 9, 1977 (age 49) Tábor, Czechoslovakia
- Height: 6 ft 2 in (188 cm)
- Weight: 195 lb (88 kg; 13 st 13 lb)
- Position: Right wing
- Shot: Right
- Played for: HC České Budějovice; Florida Panthers; New York Rangers; Edmonton Oilers; St. Louis Blues; Atlanta Thrashers; Dallas Stars; HC Davos; Anaheim Ducks; Carolina Hurricanes
- National team: Czech Republic
- NHL draft: 10th overall, 1995; Florida Panthers
- Playing career: 1993–2013

Radek Dvořák (born March 9, 1977) is a Czech former professional ice hockey right winger. Dvořák was drafted in the first round of the 1995 NHL entry draft, tenth overall, by the Florida Panthers. A veteran of 1,260 NHL games, Radek has played for the Panthers, New York Rangers, Edmonton Oilers, St. Louis Blues, Atlanta Thrashers, Dallas Stars, Anaheim Ducks and the Carolina Hurricanes.

== Playing career ==
=== Florida Panthers ===
Dvořák began his NHL career as an 18-year-old with the Florida Panthers in the 1995–96 season. In 77 games, Dvořák scored 13 goals and 27 points, as the Panthers reached the playoffs for the first time in club history. Dvořák helped the Panthers to the 1996 Stanley Cup Finals, earning four points in 16 games. He saw his numbers improve in his second season, scoring 18 goals and 39 points in 78 games to finish fourth in team scoring. He missed 18 games during the 1997–98 NHL season, but still scored 12 goals and 24 assists for 36 points. In his fourth season, Dvořák played in every game, scoring 19 goals and 43 points. He scored four shorthanded goals which placed him in a tie for fourth in the NHL. In 1999–2000, Dvořák scored 7 goals and 17 points in 35 games before being traded. On December 30, 1999, the Panthers traded him to the San Jose Sharks in exchange for Mike Vernon and the Sharks' third-round pick in the 2000 NHL entry draft, after which the Sharks traded Dvořák to the New York Rangers for Todd Harvey and the Rangers' fourth-round pick in the 2001 NHL entry draft.

=== New York Rangers ===
Dvořák finished the 1999–2000 season with the Rangers, scoring 11 goals and 33 points in 46 games. In 2000–01, Dvořák was placed on a line with fellow Czechs Petr Nedvěd and Jan Hlavac and he would have a breakout season. In 79 games, Dvořák scored 31 goals and 36 assists for 67 points to finish fourth in team scoring. However, the Rangers would once again miss the playoffs. Dvořák saw his production fall during the 2001–02 season, scoring 17 goals and 37 points in 65 games. His production continued to fall during the 2002–03 season, as Dvořák had six goals and 27 points in 63 games with the Rangers. On March 11, 2003, the Rangers traded Dvořák and Cory Cross to the Edmonton Oilers in exchange for Anson Carter and Aleš Píša.

=== Edmonton Oilers ===
Dvořák appeared in 12 games with the Oilers in 2002–03, scoring four goals and eight points, as Edmonton qualified for the playoffs. In his first playoff action since 1997, Dvorak scored a highlight reel goal in which he skated from end to end, scoring a game-winning goal. It would be his only point in four playoff games. Dvořák returned to the Oilers in 2003–04, where he scored 15 goals and 50 points in 78 games, however, Edmonton failed to make the playoffs. During the 2004–05 NHL lockout, Dvorak played with HC České Budějovice. He returned to the Oilers in 2005–06, where he had only eight goals and 28 points in 64 games. In the playoffs, Dvořák had two assists in 16 games, as the Oilers lost to the Carolina Hurricanes in the 2006 Stanley Cup Finals. He left the Oilers during the off-season, as he signed a one-year contract with the St. Louis Blues on September 14, 2006.

=== St. Louis Blues ===
Dvořák spent the 2006–07 season with the Blues, where in 82 games, he scored 10 goals and recorded 27 assists for 37 points. The Blues failed to qualify for the playoffs, and Dvořák left as a free agent after the season, returning to the Florida Panthers on July 1, 2007.

=== Second Tenure with Florida Panthers ===
Dvořák returned to his original NHL team in the 2007–08 season. In 67 games with the Panthers, Dvořák had only 8 goals and 17 points. He saw his numbers rebound in the 2008–09 season, with 15 goals and 36 points in 81 games. On July 1, 2009, Dvořák signed a two-year, $3.4 million contract extension with Florida. In the 2009–10 season, he had 14 goals and 32 points in 76 games. On December 7, 2009, he played in his 1,000th NHL game against his former club, the Edmonton Oilers, at the BankAtlantic Center.

During the 2010–11 season, the Panthers honoured Dvořák for playing more career games as a Panther than anyone in franchise history on November 23 before a game against the Pittsburgh Penguins. In 53 games that year, Dvořák had 7 goals and 14 assists for 21 points.

=== Atlanta Thrashers ===
On February 28, 2011, the Panthers traded Dvořák (along with a fifth-round pick in the 2011 NHL entry draft) to the Atlanta Thrashers in exchange for Patrick Rissmiller and Niclas Bergfors.

=== Dallas Stars ===
On July 1, 2011, Dvořák signed a one-year, $1.5 million contract with the Dallas Stars. On December 1, 2011, Radek Dvořák recorded his 350th career assist.

=== Anaheim Ducks ===
During the 2012–13 NHL lockout, and as a free agent, Dvořák signed a contract with HC Davos of the Swiss National League A. He played in the final seven regular season games with Davos and contributed in their post-season campaign before he signed for the remainder of the shortened 2012–13 NHL season with the Anaheim Ducks on March 24, 2013.

=== Carolina Hurricanes ===
On September 3, 2013, it was announced by Carolina Hurricanes general manager Jim Rutherford that Dvořák would be invited to attend the Carolina Hurricanes' training camp. He subsequently signed a two-way contract with Carolina on October 2, 2013. He scored his first goal for the Hurricanes in the second period of a game against the Philadelphia Flyers.

=== Retirement ===
Dvořák retired from professional hockey on January 27, 2015, after 18 seasons and 1,260 games played in the NHL.

== Career statistics ==
=== Regular season and playoffs ===
			Regular season					Playoffs
Season	Team	League	GP	G	A	Pts	PIM	GP	G	A	Pts	PIM
1993–94	HC České Budějovice	CZE U18	20	17	18	35	—	—	—	—	—	—
1993–94	HC České Budějovice	ELH	8	0	0	0	0	—	—	—	—	—
1994–95	HC České Budějovice	ELH	10	3	5	8	2	9	5	1	6	2
1995–96	Florida Panthers	NHL	77	13	14	27	20	16	1	3	4	0
1996–97	Florida Panthers	NHL	78	18	21	39	30	3	0	0	0	0
1997–98	Florida Panthers	NHL	64	12	24	36	33	—	—	—	—	—
1998–99	Florida Panthers	NHL	82	19	24	43	29	—	—	—	—	—
1999–2000	Florida Panthers	NHL	35	7	10	17	6	—	—	—	—	—
1999–2000	New York Rangers	NHL	46	11	22	33	10	—	—	—	—	—
2000–01	New York Rangers	NHL	82	31	36	67	20	—	—	—	—	—
2001–02	New York Rangers	NHL	65	17	20	37	14	—	—	—	—	—
2002–03	New York Rangers	NHL	63	6	21	27	16	—	—	—	—	—
2002–03	Edmonton Oilers	NHL	12	4	4	8	14	4	1	0	1	0
2003–04	Edmonton Oilers	NHL	78	15	35	50	26	—	—	—	—	—
2004–05	HC České Budějovice	Czech.1	32	23	35	58	18	11	3	9	12	12
2005–06	Edmonton Oilers	NHL	64	8	20	28	26	16	0	2	2	4
2006–07	St. Louis Blues	NHL	82	10	27	37	48	—	—	—	—	—
2007–08	Florida Panthers	NHL	67	8	9	17	16	—	—	—	—	—
2008–09	Florida Panthers	NHL	81	15	21	36	42	—	—	—	—	—
2009–10	Florida Panthers	NHL	76	14	18	32	20	—	—	—	—	—
2010–11	Florida Panthers	NHL	53	7	14	21	20	—	—	—	—	—
2010–11	Atlanta Thrashers	NHL	13	0	1	1	4	—	—	—	—	—
2011–12	Dallas Stars	NHL	73	4	17	21	12	—	—	—	—	—
2012–13	HC Davos	NLA	7	3	4	7	2	7	1	1	2	2
2012–13	Anaheim Ducks	NHL	9	4	0	4	2	—	—	—	—	—
2013–14	Carolina Hurricanes	NHL	60	4	5	9	41	—	—	—	—	—
NHL totals			1,260	227	363	590	449	39	2	5	7	4

=== International ===
Medal record

Representing Czech Republic

Ice hockey

World Championships
Gold medal – first place	1999 Oslo	
Gold medal – first place	2001 Nuremberg	
Gold medal – first place	2005 Vienna	

Year	Team	Event	GP	G	A	Pts	PIM
1994	Czech Republic	EJC	5	2	3	5	6
1995	Czech Republic	EJC	5	4	3	7	6
1999	Czech Republic	WC	10	4	4	8	6
2001	Czech Republic	WC	9	4	4	8	8
2002	Czech Republic	OG	4	0	0	0	0
2004	Czech Republic	WC	7	0	7	7	16
2004	Czech Republic	WCH	4	1	0	1	0
2005	Czech Republic	WC	9	1	1	2	4
Junior totals			10	6	6	12	12
Senior totals			43	10	16	26	34

== Transactions ==
- July 8, 1995 — Florida Panthers 1st round draft choice, 10th overall in the 1995 NHL Entry Draft.
- December 30, 1999 – Traded by the Florida Panthers to the San Jose Sharks in exchange for Mike Vernon.
- December 30, 1999 – Traded by the San Jose Sharks to the New York Rangers in exchange for Todd Harvey.
- March 11, 2003 – Traded by the New York Rangers, along with Cory Cross, to the Edmonton Oilers in exchange for Anson Carter and Aleš Píša.
- September 14, 2006 – Signed as a free agent with the St. Louis Blues.
- July 1, 2007 – Signed as a free agent with the Florida Panthers.
- July 1, 2009 – Signed a two-year, $3.4 million contract extension with Florida.
- February 28, 2011 – Traded by the Florida Panthers to the Atlanta Thrashers along with a fifth-round draft pick in exchange for Patrick Rissmiller and Niclas Bergfors.
- July 1, 2011 – Signed a one-year contract worth $1.5 million with the Dallas Stars.
- March 24, 2013 - Signed a one-year contract worth $675K with the Anaheim Ducks
- October 2, 2013 - Signed a one-year contract worth $600K with the Carolina Hurricanes
- January 27, 2015 - Retired from the NHL

Awards and achievements
Preceded by Ed Jovanovski	Florida Panthers first-round draft pick 1995	Succeeded by Marcus Nilson
