= Kari Haakana =

Finnish ice hockey player

- Born: November 8, 1973 (age 52) Outokumpu, FIN
- Height: 6 ft 1 in (185 cm)
- Weight: 227 lb (103 kg; 16 st 3 lb)
- Position: Defence
- Shot: Left
- SM-Liiga team Former teams: Kärpät; Modo Hockey; NHL; Edmonton Oilers; SM-liiga; Espoo Blues; Jokerit; Lukko; DEL; Star Bulls Rosenheim; EV Duisburg; Skellefteå AIK
- National team: Finland
- NHL draft: 248th overall, 2001; Edmonton Oilers
- Playing career: 1990–2010

Kari Haakana (born November 8, 1973, in Outokumpu, Finland) is a former ice hockey defenceman. He spent the majority of his career in Scandinavia, with brief stints in Germany and with the Edmonton Oilers.

== Biography ==
As a youth, Haakana played in the 1987 Quebec International Pee-Wee Hockey Tournament with a team from Espoo.

The Oilers selected Haakana in the eight round (248th overall) of the 2001 NHL entry draft. Haakana entered the entry draft as an overaged player and came over to Canada the following year, briefly playing for the Hamilton Bulldogs. He spent 13 games in the Oilers lineup, playing safe defensive hockey, but showing little in the way of offensive ability, scoring no points and only recording two shots.

He returned to Europe during the 2004–05 NHL lockout. Haakana played in Kiekko-Espoo for several years and also in Espoo Blues. Haakana played for Swedish Elitserien team, Skellefteå AIK from the beginning of the 2006 season to mid-January 2008 when he decided to cancel his contract and move back home to Finland to play for Kärpät.

== Career statistics ==
=== Regular season and playoffs ===
			Regular season					Playoffs
Season	Team	League	GP	G	A	Pts	PIM	GP	G	A	Pts	PIM
1990–91	Kiekko–Espoo	FIN U20	22	1	1	2	14	—	—	—	—	—
1990–91	Kiekko–Espoo	FIN.2	4	0	1	1	0	—	—	—	—	—
1991–92	Kiekko–Espoo	FIN U20	26	0	4	4	34	—	—	—	—	—
1992–93	Lukko	FIN U20	36	4	16	20	60	—	—	—	—	—
1992–93	Lukko	SM-liiga	4	0	0	0	0	—	—	—	—	—
1993–94	Kiekko–Espoo	FIN U20	5	0	2	2	2	—	—	—	—	—
1993–94	Kiekko–Espoo	SM-liiga	47	3	2	5	40	—	—	—	—	—
1994–95	Kiekko–Espoo	SM-liiga	48	4	3	7	54	4	0	0	0	0
1995–96	Kiekko–Espoo	SM-liiga	45	1	7	8	48	—	—	—	—	—
1996–97	Kiekko–Espoo	SM-liiga	48	0	12	12	69	—	—	—	—	—
1997–98	Kiekko–Espoo	SM-liiga	47	4	1	5	59	8	0	1	1	6
1998–99	Star Bulls Rosenheim GmbH	DEL	51	1	9	10	58	—	—	—	—	—
1999–2000	Star Bulls Rosenheim GmbH	DEL	51	3	5	8	46	—	—	—	—	—
2000–01	Jokerit	SM-liiga	52	2	8	10	98	5	0	0	0	2
2001–02	Hamilton Bulldogs	AHL	6	0	2	2	25	—	—	—	—	—
2001–02	Jokerit	SM-liiga	36	0	3	3	40	12	2	2	4	2
2002–03	Edmonton Oilers	NHL	13	0	0	0	4	—	—	—	—	—
2002–03	Hamilton Bulldogs	AHL	12	0	4	4	12	5	1	2	3	2
2003–04	MODO Hockey	SEL	31	1	3	4	50	6	0	0	0	12
2004–05	Blues	SM-liiga	47	1	9	10	52	—	—	—	—	—
2005–06	Blues	SM-liiga	20	0	6	6	42	—	—	—	—	—
2005–06	Füchse Duisburg	DEL	21	0	6	6	42	—	—	—	—	—
2006–07	Skellefteå AIK	SEL	43	1	11	12	56	—	—	—	—	—
2007–08	Skellefteå AIK	SEL	21	0	1	1	20	—	—	—	—	—
2007–08	Kärpät	SM-liiga	9	1	3	4	14	11	0	1	1	12
2008–09	Pelicans	SM-liiga	18	2	0	2	16	—	—	—	—	—
2009–10	Kloten Flyers	NLA	8	0	0	0	10	—	—	—	—	—
2009–10	HC Valpellice	ITA	22	1	4	5	34	4	1	1	2	6
2010–11	HDD Olimpija Ljubljana	AUT	7	0	3	3	2	—	—	—	—	—
SM-liiga totals			421	18	52	70	556	40	2	4	6	22
NHL totals			13	0	0	0	4	—	—	—	—	—
DEL totals			123	4	20	24	146	—	—	—	—	—

=== International ===
Year	Team	Event	GP	G	A	Pts	PIM
1991	Finland	EJC	6	1	1	2	0
Junior totals			6	1	1	2	0
