= Scott Ferguson (ice hockey) =

Canadian ice hockey player (born 1973)

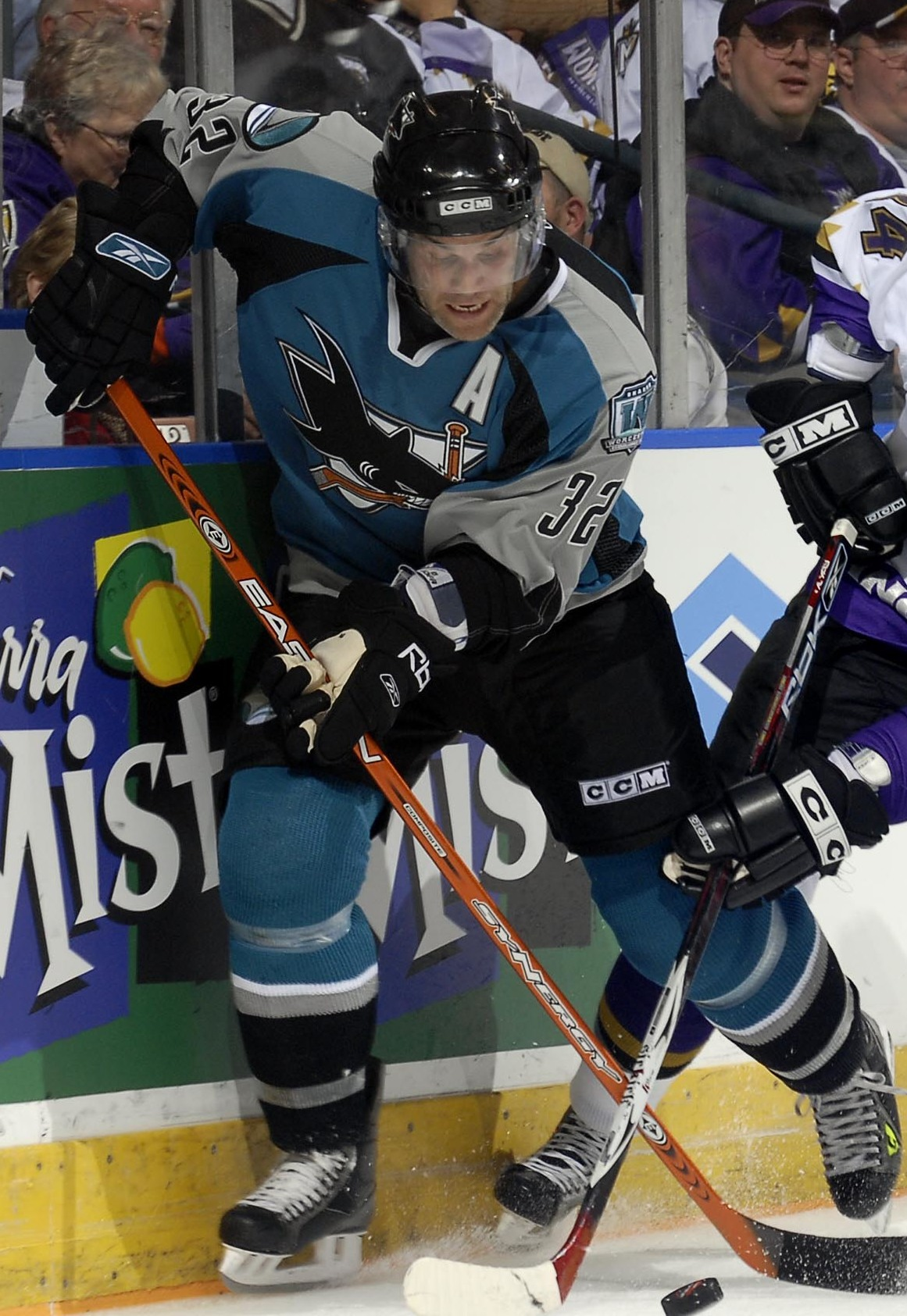
- Ferguson with the Worcester Sharks in 2006
- Born: January 6, 1973 (age 53) Camrose, Alberta, Canada
- Height: 6 ft 1 in (185 cm)
- Weight: 195 lb (88 kg; 13 st 13 lb)
- Position: Defence
- Shot: Left
- Played for: Edmonton Oilers; Mighty Ducks of Anaheim; Minnesota Wild; ERC Ingolstadt
- NHL draft: Undrafted
- Playing career: 1994–2008

Scott Ferguson (born January 6, 1973) is a Canadian Métis former professional ice hockey defenceman who played in the National Hockey League (NHL) with the Edmonton Oilers, Mighty Ducks of Anaheim and Minnesota Wild.

== Playing career ==
A great performance for the Kamloops Blazers, in the Western Hockey League (WHL) during the 1993-94 season earned Ferguson a second team all-star berth and a free agent contract from the Edmonton Oilers, which launched his professional career.

After spending most of seven seasons in the minor leagues (with the Cape Breton Oilers, Hamilton Bulldogs and Cincinnati Mighty Ducks), with only three NHL games (with Edmonton and the Mighty Ducks of Anaheim), Ferguson landed a regular job with the Oilers as a sixth/seventh defenceman, where he would play the following three seasons. Ferguson played in Sweden's HockeyAllsvenskan for Skovde IK during the NHL lockout.

Ferguson signed for the Minnesota Wild after the lockout ended. He played 15 games for the Wild and spent much of his tenure with their AHL affiliate the Houston Aeros. He then signed a one-year contract with the San Jose Sharks but was assigned to the Worcester Sharks and never played a game for San Jose.

In total, Ferguson played 218 regular season games in the NHL, scoring 7 goals and 14 assists for 21 points and collecting 310 penalty minutes. He also played 11 playoff games in two seasons for Edmonton, scoring no points and collecting 8 penalty minutes.

== Coaching career ==
After retiring from playing hockey, Ferguson was an assistant coach for the WHL's Kamloops Blazers, where he had played during his Major Junior career. He coached there for three seasons (2008–09 to 2010–11), including 10 games (7-2-1) as interim head coach during his second season.

== Career statistics ==
=== Regular season and playoffs ===
			Regular season					Playoffs
Season	Team	League	GP	G	A	Pts	PIM	GP	G	A	Pts	PIM
1990–91	Sherwood Park Crusaders	AJHL	32	2	9	11	91	—	—	—	—	—
1990–91	Kamloops Blazers	WHL	4	0	0	0	0	—	—	—	—	—
1991–92	Kamoops Blazers	WHL	62	4	10	14	138	12	0	2	2	21
1992–93	Kamoops Blazers	WHL	71	4	19	23	206	13	0	2	2	24
1993–94	Kamoops Blazers	WHL	68	5	49	54	180	19	5	11	16	48
1994–95	Cape Breton Oilers	AHL	58	4	6	10	103	—	—	—	—	—
1994–95	Wheeling Thunderbirds	ECHL	5	1	5	6	16	—	—	—	—	—
1995–96	Cape Breton Oilers	AHL	80	5	16	21	196	—	—	—	—	—
1996–97	Hamilton Bulldogs	AHL	74	6	14	20	115	21	5	7	12	59
1997–98	Edmonton Oilers	NHL	1	0	0	0	0	—	—	—	—	—
1997–98	Hamilton Bulldogs	AHL	77	7	17	24	150	9	0	3	3	16
1998–99	Mighty Ducks of Anaheim	NHL	2	0	1	1	0	—	—	—	—	—
1998–99	Cincinnati Mighty Ducks	AHL	78	4	31	35	144	3	0	0	0	4
1999–00	Cincinnati Mighty Ducks	AHL	77	7	25	32	166	—	—	—	—	—
2000–01	Edmonton Oilers	NHL	20	0	1	1	13	6	0	0	0	2
2000–01	Hamilton Bulldogs	AHL	42	3	18	21	79	—	—	—	—	—
2001–02	Edmonton Oilers	NHL	50	3	2	5	75	—	—	—	—	—
2002–03	Edmonton Oilers	NHL	78	3	5	8	120	5	0	0	0	8
2003–04	Edmonton Oilers	NHL	52	1	5	6	80	—	—	—	—	—
2004–05	Skövde IK	Allsv	8	1	2	3	10	10	0	2	2	57
2005–06	Minnesota Wild	NHL	15	0	0	0	22	—	—	—	—	—
2005–06	Houston Aeros	AHL	46	5	8	13	105	8	0	2	2	21
2006–07	Worcester Sharks	AHL	79	4	19	23	101	6	0	0	0	6
2007–08	ERC Ingolstadt	DEL	56	6	10	16	110	3	0	0	0	2
NHL totals			218	7	14	21	310	11	0	0	0	8

== Awards and honours ==
Award	Year
WHL
West Second All-Star Team	1994

== Transactions ==
- June 2, 1994 - Edmonton signs Ferguson.
- March 9, 1998 - Edmonton trades Ferguson to the Ottawa Senators for Frank Musil.
- July 27, 1998 - Anaheim signs Ferguson.
- July 5, 2000 - Edmonton signs Ferguson
- August 4, 2005 - Minnesota signs Ferguson.
- July 14, 2006 - San Jose signs Ferguson.
