= Anson Carter =

Canadian ice hockey player (born 1974)

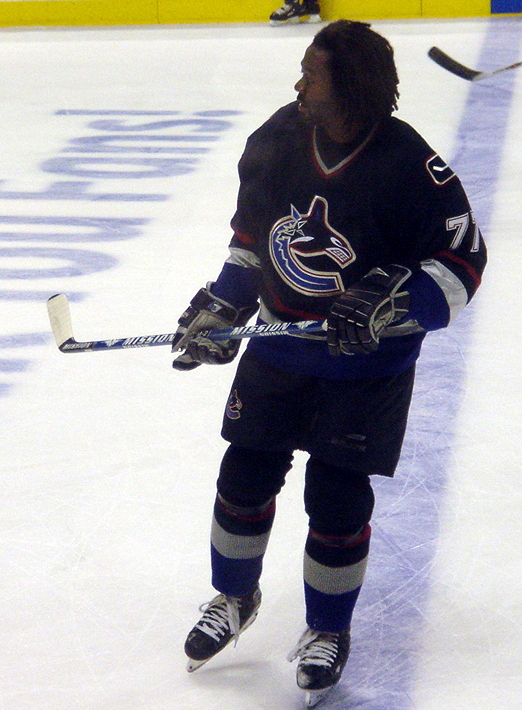
- Carter with the Vancouver Canucks in 2005
- Born: June 6, 1974 (age 52) Toronto, Ontario, Canada
- Height: 6 ft 1 in (185 cm)
- Weight: 219 lb (99 kg; 15 st 9 lb)
- Position: Right wing
- Shot: Right
- Played for: Washington Capitals; Boston Bruins; Edmonton Oilers; New York Rangers; Los Angeles Kings; Vancouver Canucks; Columbus Blue Jackets; Carolina Hurricanes; HC Lugano
- National team: Canada
- NHL draft: 220th overall, 1992; Quebec Nordiques
- Playing career: 1996–2008

Anson Horace Carter (born June 6, 1974) is a Canadian former professional ice hockey right winger who played in the National Hockey League (NHL) for eight teams from 1996 to 2007, most notably with the Boston Bruins, Edmonton Oilers and Vancouver Canucks. He was last active as a player with HC Lugano in the Swiss Nationalliga A. After retiring from professional hockey, he joined NBC Sports as an analyst and is now currently an analyst for NHL on TNT and MSG Network.

Carter is also the founder of Big Up Entertainment, a record label specializing in hip hop music. He attended high school at Agincourt Collegiate Institute and attended Michigan State University where he played at the college level. He is of Bajan descent.

== Early life ==
Anson Carter was born on June 6, 1974, in Toronto, Ontario. He is one of three children of Horace and Valma Carter, who emigrated from Barbados. He started playing hockey seriously at the age of eight. Carter received a scholarship to play hockey at Michigan State University (MSU) in 1992.

== Playing career ==
Carter was drafted by the Quebec Nordiques in the 1992 NHL entry draft in the 10th round, 220th overall, after playing AAA level hockey in the Metro Toronto Hockey League.

After completing his AAA hockey career, Carter played one season in the Metro Junior 'A' Hockey League for the Wexford Raiders, scoring 18 goals and adding 22 assists for 40 points in 42 games, helping the Raiders to a league title as a result of sweeping the Bramalea Blues 4–0 in the championship final. (Incidentally, the Raiders' head coach was Stan Butler, current special advisor to the owner of the Ontario Hockey League's North Bay Battalion).

Carter went on to play four years at Michigan State University, earning himself honours on the CCHA First All-Star Team in 1994 and 1995, Second All-Star Team in 1996, as well as the NCAA West Second All-American Team in 1995.

On April 3, 1996, the Nordiques' successor, the Colorado Avalanche, traded his rights to the Washington Capitals in exchange for a fourth-round pick in the 1996 NHL entry draft.

Carter made his professional debut in 1996–97, splitting his time with the Capitals and their American Hockey League (AHL) affiliate, the Portland Pirates, before being traded to the Boston Bruins on March 1, 1997. As part of a blockbuster deal, Carter was sent with Jason Allison, Jim Carey, a third-round selection in the 1997 draft (63rd overall–Lee Goren) and a conditional second-round pick in the 1998 draft to the Bruins in exchange for Adam Oates, Bill Ranford and Rick Tocchet. Both Carter and Tocchet would work together as studio analysts with the NHL on TNT nearly a quarter of a century later beginning in 2021.

After spending several seasons with the Bruins, Carter was traded (along with a conditional pick in the 2003 draft, a first- and a second-round pick in the 2001 draft) to the Edmonton Oilers in exchange for Bill Guerin and a first-round pick in the 2001 draft. In his second season with Edmonton, Carter would record career-highs in assists (32) and points (60). However, on March 11, 2003, he was again traded, to the New York Rangers (along with Aleš Píša) in exchange for Radek Dvořák and Cory Cross.

At the completion of the 2002–03 season, Carter played for Canada in the 2003 World Championships. Over 14 minutes into the first overtime of the gold medal game against Sweden, Carter beat Swedish goaltender Mikael Tellqvist with a wraparound goal. The goal was contested for several minutes before replays confirmed Tellqvist had stopped the puck behind the goal line. It was Canada's first World Championship win in five years.

Lasting half a season with the Rangers, Carter was traded back to the Washington Capitals on January 23, 2004, in exchange for Jaromír Jágr. His second go with the Capitals was even more short-lived than his stint with New York, as he was flipped to the Los Angeles Kings for Jared Aulin just over a month later on March 8, 2004.

On August 16, 2005, Carter signed a one-year contract with the Vancouver Canucks as an unrestricted free agent. He played in Vancouver on the second offensive line with twins Henrik and Daniel Sedin, where the trio were known colloquially as the "Brothers Line". He set a new career-high in goals with 33, leading the team, and earned the Canucks' Most Exciting Player Award. However, he did not re-sign with the Canucks at the end of the season.

On September 13, 2006, Carter signed a one-year contract with the Columbus Blue Jackets, but was traded once again to the Carolina Hurricanes on February 23, 2007, in exchange for a fifth-round pick in the 2008 NHL draft (Tomas Kubalik).

In September 2007, Carter rejoined the Edmonton Oilers on a try-out basis during their training camp, and played one exhibition game before being released on October 2, 2007. Without an NHL job, on November 5, Carter joined HC Lugano of the Swiss Nationalliga A.

== Post-playing career ==
After playing in the NHL for 11 seasons, Carter began his post-hockey career in 2013 with the NBC Sports coverage of NHL regular season, and Stanley Cup Playoffs games. Besides covering the professional ranks, Carter provides game analysis for NBCSN's Notre Dame's Fighting Irish college hockey. Additionally, Carter also made his debut as part of the 2018 Olympic coverage of the PyeongChang Winter games.

On Canadian television, starting in 2022, Carter was a panelist on Sportsnet's Rogers Monday Night Hockey NHL broadcasts. He continues to be on Sportsnet NHL coverage in 2024.

Carter founded the Big Up Entertainment record label in March 2005. The label's first release was from Richmond, Virginia, natives Main & Merc.

Carter now lives in Atlanta, Georgia. In 2022, Carter become the minority owner of the Atlanta Gladiators of the ECHL. He is currently seeking to bring an NHL expansion team to Atlanta, with his new group Alpharetta Sports & Entertainment, which would be the city’s third team since the departure of the Atlanta Flames in 1980 and the Atlanta Thrashers in 2011.

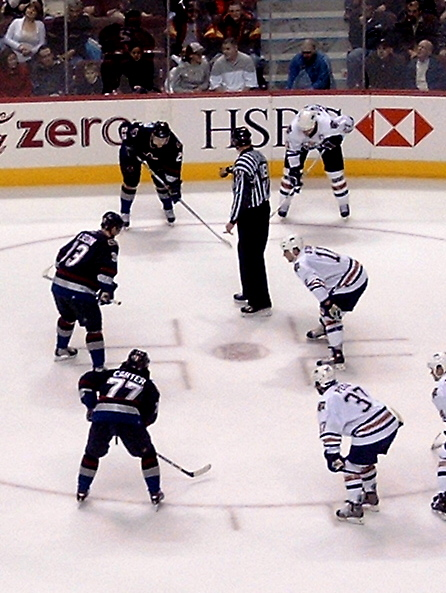
Anson Carter on the bottom left of a faceoff with the Vancouver Canucks

== Career statistics ==
=== Regular season and playoffs ===
			Regular season					Playoffs
Season	Team	League	GP	G	A	Pts	PIM	GP	G	A	Pts	PIM
1991–92	Wexford Raiders	MetJHL	42	18	22	40	24	—	—	—	—	—
1992–93	Michigan State University	CCHA	36	19	11	30	20	—	—	—	—	—
1993–94	Michigan State University	CCHA	39	30	24	54	36	—	—	—	—	—
1994–95	Michigan State University	CCHA	39	34	17	51	40	—	—	—	—	—
1995–96	Michigan State University	CCHA	42	23	20	43	36	—	—	—	—	—
1996–97	Washington Capitals	NHL	19	3	2	5	7	—	—	—	—	—
1996–97	Portland Pirates	AHL	27	19	19	38	11	—	—	—	—	—
1996–97	Boston Bruins	NHL	19	8	5	13	2	—	—	—	—	—
1997–98	Boston Bruins	NHL	78	16	27	43	31	6	1	1	2	0
1998–99	Boston Bruins	NHL	55	24	16	40	22	12	4	3	7	0
1999–00	Boston Bruins	NHL	59	22	25	47	14	—	—	—	—	—
2000–01	Edmonton Oilers	NHL	61	16	26	42	23	6	3	1	4	4
2001–02	Edmonton Oilers	NHL	82	28	32	60	25	—	—	—	—	—
2002–03	Edmonton Oilers	NHL	68	25	30	55	20	—	—	—	—	—
2002–03	New York Rangers	NHL	11	1	4	5	6	—	—	—	—	—
2003–04	New York Rangers	NHL	43	10	7	17	14	—	—	—	—	—
2003–04	Washington Capitals	NHL	19	5	5	10	6	—	—	—	—	—
2003–04	Los Angeles Kings	NHL	15	0	1	1	0	—	—	—	—	—
2005–06	Vancouver Canucks	NHL	81	33	22	55	41	—	—	—	—	—
2006–07	Columbus Blue Jackets	NHL	54	10	17	27	16	—	—	—	—	—
2006–07	Carolina Hurricanes	NHL	10	1	0	1	2	—	—	—	—	—
2007–08	HC Lugano	NLA	15	3	5	8	22	—	—	—	—	—
NHL totals			674	202	219	421	229	24	8	5	13	4

=== International ===
Medal record

Representing Canada

World Championships
Gold medal – first place	1997 Finland	
Gold medal – first place	2003 Finland	

World Junior Championships
Gold medal – first place	1994 Czech Republic	

Year	Team	Event	GP	G	A	Pts	PIM
1994	Canada	WJC	7	3	2	5	0
1997	Canada	WC	11	4	2	6	4
2003	Canada	WC	9	2	1	3	8
Junior totals			7	3	2	5	0
Senior totals			20	6	3	9	12

== Awards and honours ==
Award	Year
All-CCHA First Team	1993–94; 1994–95
AHCA West Second-Team All-American	1994–95
All-CCHA Second Team	1995–96
Vancouver Canucks Most Exciting Player Award	2005–06

== Transactions ==
- June 20, 1992 – Quebec Nordiques' 10th round draft choice, 220th overall, in the 1992 NHL entry draft.
- June 21, 1995 – Rights transferred to the Colorado Avalanche after Quebec Nordiques relocation.
- April 3, 1996 – Traded by the Colorado Avalanche to the Washington Capitals in exchange for Washington's 1996 4th round draft choice.
- March 1, 1997 – Traded by the Washington Capitals, along with Jim Carey, Jason Allison and Washington's 1997 3rd round draft choice to the Boston Bruins in exchange for Bill Ranford, Adam Oates and Rick Tocchet.
- November 15, 2000 – Traded by the Boston Bruins, along with Boston's 2001 1st round draft choice and Boston's 2001 2nd round draft choice to the Edmonton Oilers in exchange for Bill Guerin and future considerations.
- March 11, 2003 – Traded by the Edmonton Oilers, along with Aleš Píša, to the New York Rangers in exchange for Radek Dvořák and Cory Cross.
- January 23, 2004 – Traded by the New York Rangers to the Washington Capitals in exchange for Jaromír Jágr.
- March 8, 2004 – Traded by the Washington Capitals to the Los Angeles Kings in exchange for Jared Aulin.
- August 17, 2005 – Signed a one-year, $1 million contract as a free agent with the Vancouver Canucks.
- September 13, 2006 – Signed a one-year, $2.5 million contract as a free agent with the Columbus Blue Jackets.
- February 23, 2007 – Traded by the Columbus Blue Jackets to the Carolina Hurricanes in exchange for Carolina's 2008 5th round draft choice (Tomáš Kubalík).

== See also ==
- List of black NHL players
