= Filip Forsberg =

Swedish ice hockey player (born 1994)

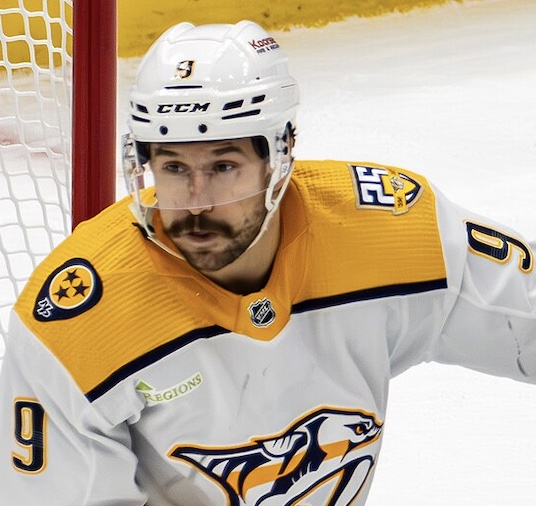
- Forsberg with the Nashville Predators in 2023
- Born: 13 August 1994 (age 32) Heby, Sweden
- Height: 185 cm (6 ft 1 in)
- Weight: 93 kg (205 lb; 14 st 9 lb)
- Position: Left wing
- Shoots: Right
- NHL team: Nashville Predators
- National team: Sweden
- NHL draft: 11th overall, 2012; Washington Capitals
- Playing career: 2012–present

Carl Filip Anton Forsberg (pronounced [ˈfǐːlɪp ˈfɔ̂ʂːbærj]; born 13 August 1994) is a Swedish professional ice hockey player who is a left winger and alternate captain for the Nashville Predators of the National Hockey League (NHL). Forsberg was selected by the Washington Capitals in the first round, 11th overall, of the 2012 NHL entry draft but was traded to the Predators before ever playing for the team.

As a native of Sweden, Forsberg has represented his home country at both the junior and senior levels at international tournaments. While representing Sweden, he has won five silver medals and two gold medals.

== Playing career ==
=== Swedish career ===
Forsberg had standout performances at both the 2011 Ivan Hlinka Memorial Tournament in Břeclav, Czech Republic, and the World U18 Championships Tournament in Brno, Czech Republic, where he was a member of the silver medal-winning Sweden teams. At the World Juniors in Brno, he was also named Best Forward of the tournament. In the NHL Central Scouting Bureau's final rankings, Forsberg was the highest-rated European-based forward available in the 2012 NHL entry draft. He was eventually selected 11th overall by the Washington Capitals and signed a three-year, entry-level contract with the team on 13 July 2012.

Forsberg was returned to his former club, Leksands IF, on loan for the duration of the 2012–13 season. He again improved upon his season totals for the third consecutive year to finish with 33 points in 38 games to help Leksand gain promotion to return to the Swedish Hockey League (SHL) for the following season.

=== Nashville Predators ===
==== Early years and development (2013–2015) ====
On 3 April 2013, while playing in Allsvenskan, Forsberg was traded to the Nashville Predators in exchange for Martin Erat and Michael Latta. Forsberg later stated that this trade rattled him because it was unusual for teams to trade first-round draft picks before they played in the NHL. When his Swedish season ended, Forsberg joined the Predators in Tennessee for the remainder of the lockout-shortened 2012–13 season. After participating in one practice with the team, Forsberg made his NHL debut on 14 April 2013 against the Detroit Red Wings. He recorded two shots on goal and finished with a minus 2 rating through 18:37 minutes of ice time. Upon making his debut at 18 years, 244 days, Forsberg became the third-youngest player in franchise history to suit up for the Predators. He later recorded his first career NHL point with an assist on David Legwand's 200th career NHL goal on 24 April against the Calgary Flames. He was reassigned to the Predators American Hockey League (AHL) affiliate, the Milwaukee Admirals, on 25 April for one game to ensure he only played five games at the NHL level. This was because the Predators would burn a year of his entry-level contract if he played over five games in one season.

Forsberg scored his first NHL goal on 8 October 2013, against the Minnesota Wild to help the Predators earn their first win of the 2013–14 season. He recorded five points over 11 games with the Predators before being reassigned to the Admirals on 7 November 2013 to get more playing time. While he was recalled back to the NHL level on 14 November, Forsberg suffered an upper body injury the following day and was sidelined for numerous games. He was activated off the Predators injured reserve list in mid-December and returned to the AHL. At the end of the month, after collecting eight points in seven games with the Admirals, Forsberg was loaned to Team Sweden to compete at the 2014 World Junior Ice Hockey Championships. He was crowned tournament MVP after finishing with a silver medal and 12 points through seven games. Forsberg returned to the Admirals lineup following the tournament. He was briefly recalled to the NHL in late March but was returned to the Admirals the following day. Forsberg finished the 2013–14 season with five points through 13 NHL games and 34 points through 47 AHL games.

Due to his limited number of NHL games and young age, Forsberg was still considered a rookie in the 2014–15 season. He began the season tied for the team lead in scoring while playing on the Predators' second line with Derek Roy and Craig Smith. By mid-October, Forberg had accumulated five points as the Predators maintained a 3–2–0 record. His play through October led to a swift promotion to the Predators first line with James Neal and Mike Ribeiro. As a member of this line, Forsberg continued to lead all NHL rookies in scoring and broke Alexander Radulov's franchise rookie record by maintaining a seven-game point streak. He also led the entire NHL with a plus-minus rating of +19. While Forsberg credited much of his success to playing with Neal and Ribeiro, head coach Peter Laviolette said that he was impressed with Forsberg since training camp. After finishing November leading all rookies with nine goals and six assists, Forsberg was named the NHL's Rookie of the Month. He continued to score at a rapid pace and continued to lead all rookies in goals, assists, shots on net, and points through December. Forsberg maintained his lead among rookies through January and set two new franchise rookie records. On 5 January, Forsberg surpassed Radulov's franchise record for points by a rookie with his 38th point of the season. Shortly thereafter, he also matched Martin Erat's franchise record for assists by a rookie. As a result of his accomplishments, Forsberg was one of six rookies selected to participate in the All-Star Skills Competition at the 2015 National Hockey League All-Star Game. However, Forsberg, Aaron Ekblad, and Johnny Gaudreau were eventually promoted to the All-Star Game as injury replacements. He subsequently became the first Predators player in franchise history to score a goal in an NHL All-Star Game. Forsberg finished the month of January as the Predators' new franchise leader in assists and points by a rookie. On February 12, during a game against the Winnipeg Jets, Forsberg surpassed Radulov's franchise record for most goals by a rookie with his 19th of the season. This also marked his 11th point (five goals and seven assists) over 11 games. He finished February clinching another rookie record from Radulov with his fourth game-winning goal. While he experienced a nine-game scoring drought to start March, he broke this streak by recording assists in back-to-back games against the Anaheim Ducks and Minnesota Wild. Forsberg then went on to score eight points over nine games, including three points in his first game against the Washington Capitals. On March 28, Forsberg recorded a goal and two assists against the Capitals to help the Predators clinch a spot in the 2015 Stanley Cup playoffs.

Although Forsberg finished the regular season third among all rookies with 26 goals and 37 assists, he was not named a finalist for the Calder Memorial Trophy as the NHL's Rookie of the Year. He was also one of two players on the team to reach 60 points, marking the first time the Predators had two players reach this milestone in seven seasons. Forsberg made his postseason debut with the Predators in Game 1 of the Western Conference first round against the Chicago Blackhawks. With the Predators facing an 0–2 series deficit, Forsberg recorded his first playoff goal in Game 3 to help lift the Predators to their first win of the series. He subsequently became the youngest player in franchise history to score a playoff goal at 20 years and 247 days. Later on, Forsberg also recorded his first playoff hat-trick to help the Predators avoid elimination. This also marked the first hat-trick scored in franchise history. Despite his efforts, the Predators were eliminated by the eventual Stanley Cup champion Blackhawks in Game 6. As a result of his play during his rookie season, Forsberg was voted to the 2014-15 NHL All-Rookie Team and placed fourth in Calder Trophy voting.

==== Setting records and Stanley Cup Final run (2015–2019) ====
Forsberg returned to the Predators lineup for the 2015–16 season but struggled early to find consistency in scoring. As such, he was limited to only two goals and 11 points through the first 20 games of the season. Forsberg eventually broke his 17-game scoring drought in a 3–2 loss to the Philadelphia Flyers on 27 November 2015. Despite breaking this drought, Forsberg only began to pick up momentum in late December when he scored five goals over eight games. He continued to score throughout January and February and quickly accumulated 13 goals over 21 games. During this time, he also set numerous franchise records and was honoured as the NHL's First Star of the Week at the end of February. On February 23, during a game against the Toronto Maple Leafs, Forsberg became the youngest player in franchise history to record a regular-season hat trick. Two days later, he recorded a second natural hat-trick and one assist to lift the Predators to a 5–0 win over the St. Louis Blues. This marked the shortest period between natural hat tricks in NHL history since 1987–88 and made him the first player in Predators history to record multiple hat tricks in a single season. His 12 goals in February also marked a new franchise record for most goals in one month. As a result of these accomplishments, Forsberg was recognized as the NHL's First Star of the Week. Forsberg added two goals through two games in March to become the first Predators player to average at least one goal per game over a 14-game span. On 25 March, Forsberg and Neal became the first pair of Predators to reach 30 goals since Paul Kariya and Steve Sullivan in 2005–06. Forsberg finished the regular season leading the team with 33 goals and 64 points as they qualified for the 2016 Stanley Cup playoffs. His 33 goals tied Jason Arnott's franchise record for most goals in a single-season. However, Forsberg was less successful in the playoffs as he accumulated only two goals through 14 games. It was later revealed that he had been suffering from a back injury throughout the playoffs but played regardless. While he was not nominated for any awards, he placed 10th in Frank J. Selke Trophy voting as the NHL's best defensive forward. Before he was set to become a restricted free agent on 1 July, Forsberg signed a six-year, $36 million contract to remain in Nashville on 27 June.

During the 2016 offseason, Forsberg and teammate Mattias Ekholm represented Team Sweden at the 2016 World Cup of Hockey. Upon rejoining the Predators for the 2016–17 season, Forsberg spent the majority of the season playing on the top line with Ryan Johansen and fellow Swede Viktor Arvidsson. The trio were subsequently referred to as the "JoFA line" due to their first name initials and reference to the Swedish hockey brand Jofa. While he started the season leading the team with five assists through six games, Forsberg again struggled to find consistent goal scoring. His struggles continued through November and only two of his 16 points were goals by the end of the month. While Forsberg and his linemates all struggled to score, they began to pick up by December. He ended January with five game winning goals in one month to pass Martin Erat's previous franchise record of four. In February 2017, Forsberg scored back-to-back hat-tricks against the Calgary Flames and the Colorado Avalanche, making him the first player in Predators history and the first NHL player in over seven years to accomplish the feat. He also tied Steve Sullivan's franchise record for most hat tricks in franchise history with four. As a result of these accomplishments, Forsberg was named the NHL's First Star of the Week for the week ending on 26 February. He was also recognized as the NHL's Second Star of February after finishing the month leading the NHL with 11 goals. Forsberg continued to score through March and accumulated 10 goals over five games to set a new franchise record. By mid-March, he led the team with 28 goals and helped the Predators narrowly clinch a berth in the 2017 Stanley Cup playoffs an eighth seed. Forsberg finished his sophomore season tied with Arvidsson for the team lead in goals with 31. He also became the first player in franchise history to record 30 or more goals in consecutive seasons. During the 2017 Stanley Cup playoffs, Forsberg remained on the Predators top line with Johansen and Arvidsson as the Predators faced off against the Chicago Blackhawks in the first round. He scored two goals in Game 3 to help push the game to overtime and an eventual Predators win. Forsberg tallied two goals and three assists as the Predators swept the top-seeded Blackhawks in four games, while the trio combined for 15 points. However, the "JoFA line" struggled in the next round series against the St. Louis Blues and combined for only three points over five games. Despite this, the Predators defeated the Blues and advanced to the Western Conference Final for the first time in franchise history. In the first three games of the Conference Final against the Anaheim Ducks, the "JoFA line" combined for four goals and six assists. Forsberg scored goals in four constructive games to help the Predators maintain a 3–2 series lead over the Ducks. However, an injury to Johansen in Game 5 resulted in the "JoFA line" being split up and Forsberg playing with Colton Sissons and Pontus Aberg. While playing with his new linemates, Forsberg scored an empty-net goal in Game 6 to become the franchise leader in postseason goals. The empty-net goal allowed Forsberg to push his points streak to seven games and continue to lead the team with eight goals and 15 points. His goal also helped the Predators secure a series win and advance to the 2017 Stanley Cup Final for the first time in franchise history, where they lost in six games to the defending champion Pittsburgh Penguins. Forsberg finished the playoffs with nine goals and seven assists for 16 points.

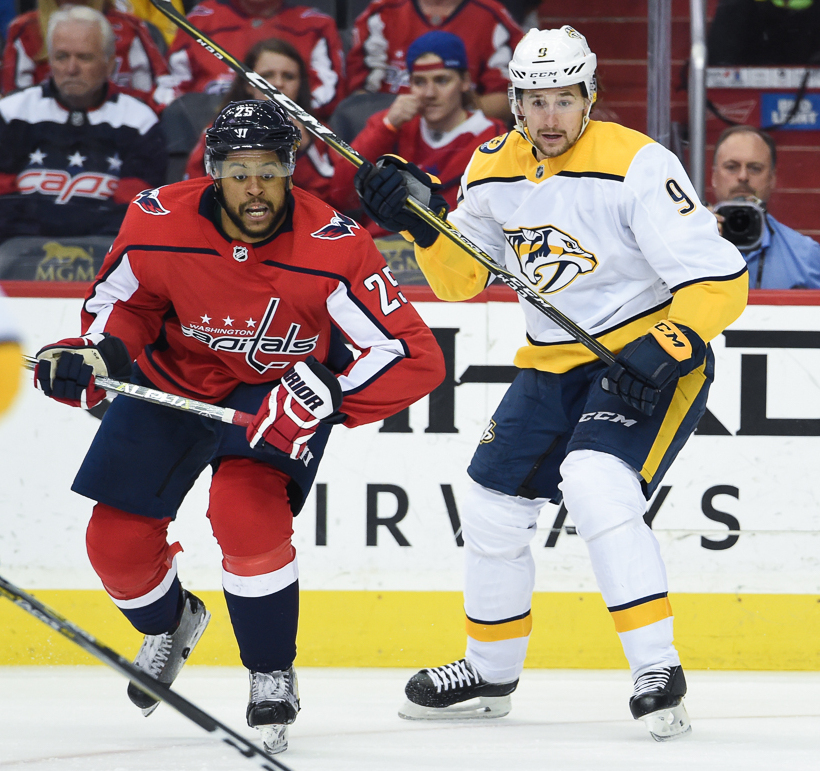
Forsberg with the Predators skating against Devante Smith-Pelly in an April 2018 game.

Before the start of the 2017–18 season, Forsberg was one of four forwards the Predators protected from the 2017 NHL expansion draft. As such, James Neal was chosen by the Vegas Golden Knights in the draft. In September 2017, Forsberg was named an alternate captain alongside Mattias Ekholm and Ryan Johansen. He quickly became the first Predators player of the season to reach double digits in points with six goals and five assists through eight games. He scored his 100th career NHL goal on 14 November to help the Predators secure a 6–3 win over the Washington Capitals. He continued to lead the Predators in scoring through November and December before suffering an upper-body injury on 29 December during a game against the Minnesota Wild. At the time of the injury, he had accumulated 15 goals and 19 assists for 34 points and was one of only nine NHL players to play in all regular-season games since the 2014–15 season. Forsberg missed a month of game play to recover but tallied two points in his return on 1 February 2018. During his absence, the Predators maintained a 7–2–2 record and averaged 2.3 goals per game. However, he was subsequently suspended for three games due to a "late, high hit causing an injury" in his second game back against the New York Rangers. After returning to the Predators lineup, he became the second player in franchise history and 13th NHL player overall to score on a penalty shot in overtime. He continued to produce offensively for the Predators through February and March en route to their fourth consecutive berth in the Stanley Cup playoffs. He scored two goals and one assist on 1 April to help the Predators set a new franchise record with their 51st win of the season. Forsberg recorded his fifth career hat trick in the Predators final game of the regular season to finish with a team-leading 64 points. As the Predators finished the season with the Presidents' Trophy, they met with the eighth-seeded Colorado Avalanche in the first round. Forsberg recorded two goals in Game 1 and added another two in Games 4 and 6 to tie Austin Watson for the team lead in goals by the time the series ended. After defeating tha Avalanche in six games, Forsberg quickly accumulated three goals and six assists through the first six games of their second-round series against the Winnipeg Jets. While he finished the playoffs matching his previous seasons points total in fewer games, the Predators failed to advance to the Western Conference Final, losing to the Jets in seven games. Shortly following their elimination, Forsberg, Arvidsson, and Mattias Ekholm were selected to represent Team Sweden at the 2018 IIHF World Championship.

Forsberg began the 2018–19 season playing alongside his usual linemates Ryan Johansen and Viktor Arvidsson. The "JoFA line" combined for 28 points through the first nine games of the season while also helping the Predators maintain a five-game win streak. After recording his sixth regular-season hat trick on 27 October, Forsberg beat his previous franchise record for most goals in a single month. This also marked the fastest pace to 10 goals in franchise history. Despite their early season success, an injury to Arvidsson necessitated Craig Smith replacing him on the Predators' top line in mid-November. After recording 14 goals and 22 points, Forsberg suffered an injury on 29 November 2018 and subsequently missed 17 games to recover. During his absence, the Predators went through a six-game losing streak and maintained an 8–7–2 record. When he returned to the Predators lineup on 7 January 2019, he was placed on their third line in an effort to slowly reacclimate him. Forsberg played one game on the Predators third line before returning to the first line with Arvidson and Johansen. He missed one game in March due to a lower-body injury but returned to the Predators lineup the following game and recorded two goals. On 16 March, Forsberg recorded his 300th career NHL point to help give the Predators the lead in their 4–2 win over the San Jose Sharks. Forsberg finished the regular-season fourth on the team with 60 points as the Predators advanced to the 2019 Stanley Cup playoffs. However, the "JoFA line" were not as productive in the postseason and they combined for only four points in their first-round series against the Dallas Stars. Forsberg tied with Johansen and finished with one goal and one assist over six games.

==== COVID-19 and playoff struggles (2019–present) ====
The Predators' offseason signing of Matt Duchene resulted in the restructuring of the team's top lines for the 2019–20 season. Forsberg started the season on the Predators' second line with Duchene and Mikael Granlund while Craig Smith joined Johansen and Arvidsson on the top unit. Despite missing a few days of training camp due to an undisclosed ailment, Forsberg became the first player in franchise history to score at least one goal in the team's first four games. He also tied a franchise record by accumulating six points over the team's first six games. However, he then missed six consecutive games due to a lower-body injury and returned at the end of October. Forsberg and the Predators struggled throughout the first half of the 2019–20 season and head coach Peter Laviolette was eventually fired on 7 January as the team held a 19-15-7 record. Later that month, Forsberg became the second player in NHL history to score a "Michigan goal", behind only Andrei Svechnikov of the Carolina Hurricanes. On 5 March, Forsberg ended his 16-game scoring drought by scoring his first goal since 30 January to help the Predators shutout the Stars. A few games later, Forsberg scored his 20th and 21st goals of the season against the Montreal Canadiens and tied Shea Weber for second on the team's all-time goals list. He also became the first player in franchise history to record six consecutive 20-goal seasons. Due to the COVID-19 pandemic, the league paused the remainder of the regular season shortly after this game. At the time of the pause, Forsberg had accumulated 21 goals and 27 assists. When the NHL returned to play for the 2020 Stanley Cup playoffs, the Predators joined the bio-secure bubble in Edmonton, Alberta for the entirety of the postseason. During the Western Conference qualifying round against the Arizona Coyotes, the "JoFA line" combined for 13 points over four games. Despite their efforts, the Predators failed to advance in the playoffs.

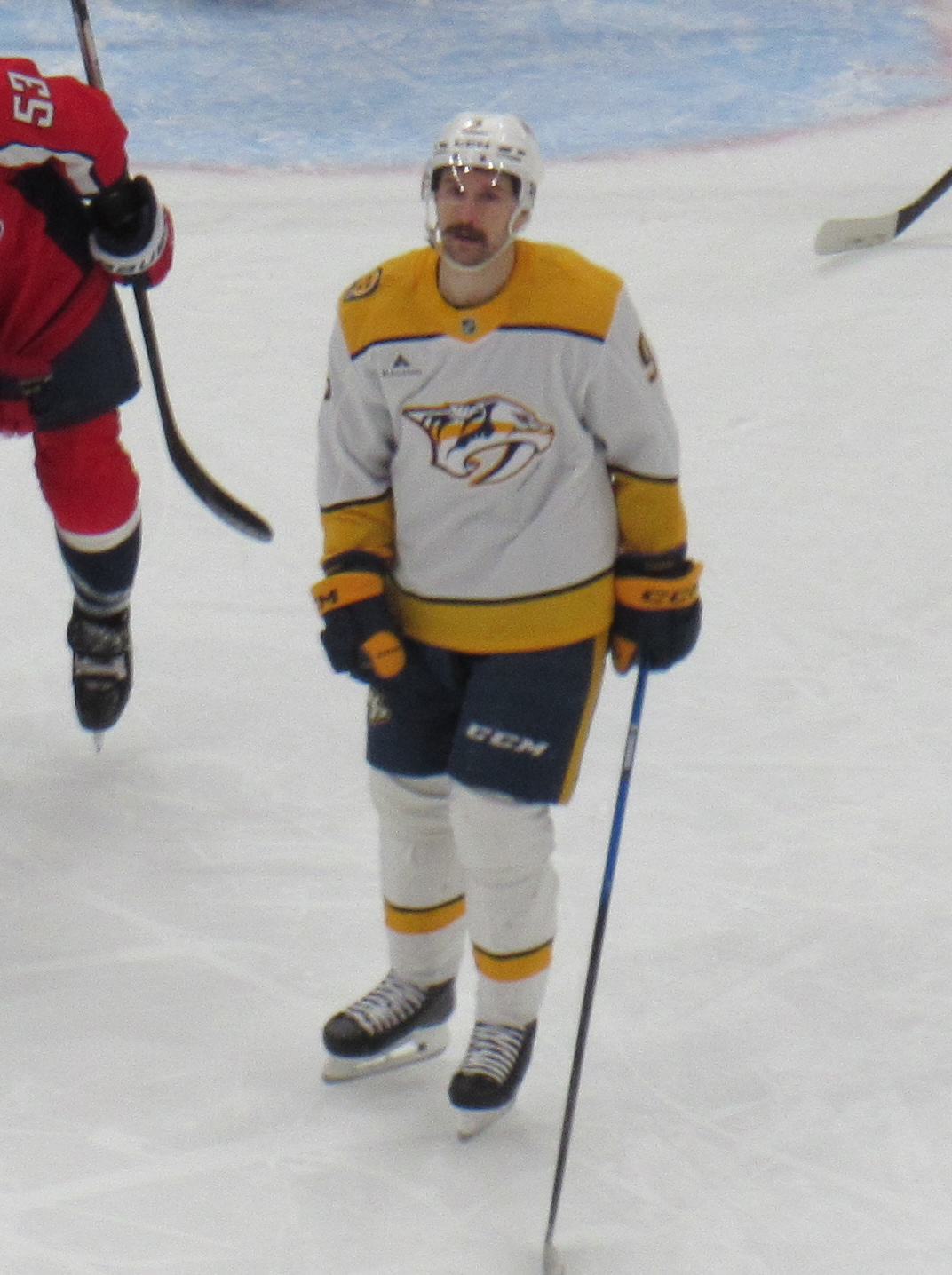
Forsberg in February 2026

In the 2021–22 season, Forsberg enjoyed a resurgent year offensively, alongside Matt Duchene and Ryan Johansen. On 30 November, Forsberg tied a franchise record by scoring four goals in one game en route to a 6–0 win against the Columbus Blue Jackets. His four goals also allowed him to reach his 400th NHL point milestone in the fewest games in franchise history. On 8 January 2022, Forsberg was put on the Predators COVID-19 list. At the time, he led the team with 18 goals and 29 points. He missed four games while in the protocols before returning to the Predators lineup for their game against the St. Louis Blues. On 19 March, Forsberg surpassed David Legwand as the leading goal scorer in Predators history, scoring his 211th goal in a 6–3 win over the Toronto Maple Leafs. Three days later, he beat Viktor Arvidsson's single-season scoring record set in 2018–19 by scoring two goals in one game. He finished the season setting career highs with 42 goals and assists for 84 points in just 69 games as the Predators narrowly qualified for the 2022 playoffs as an eighth seed, where they would get swept in the first round by the top-seeded and eventual Stanley Cup champion Colorado Avalanche.

As a pending free agent for the first time in his career, Forsberg opted to remain with the Predators after signing an eight-year, $68 million contract extension to stay until the 2029–30 season on 9 July 2022. Forsberg recorded three points in his 600th career NHL game on 30 December 2022 against the Anaheim Ducks. The following day, he scored a hat-trick against the Vegas Golden Knights to become the third player in franchise history to reach the 500-point milestone. However, he suffered a concussion on 11 February 2023 and missed the remainder of the season to recover. At the time of the injury, he ranked second in team scoring with 19 goals and 23 assists.

On 24 February 2024, Forsberg recorded a goal and an assist against the San Jose Sharks to pass David Legwand on the franchise's all-time scoring list. After going numerous games without a goal, Forsberg broke two franchise records during a game against the Chicago Blackhawks on 13 April. He set a new franchise single-season scoring record with 46 goals while also scoring his 10th career hat trick. His second goal of the game also broke the franchise record for most multi-goal games in a season.

On 13 October 2024, Forsberg became the sixth player in franchise history to play 700 games with the team. In 2025, Forsberg set numerous personal and franchise records. On 16 January 2025, Forsberg recorded his 300th NHL goal and extended his goal streak to four games. He was later recognized as the NHL's Second Star of the Week ending on 19 January after recording four goals and seven points over three games. The following month, he became the seventh Swedish-born player in NHL history to record nine or more 20-goal seasons. He also extended his game-winning goal lead among Swedish players.

== Personal life ==
Forsberg was born to Carina Dahlberg and Patrik Forsberg. At birth, he was named Carl Filip Anton Forsberg, although he is referred to by his second name, "Filip". His younger brother Fredrik plays hockey in the Björklöven organization. The brothers are of no relation to Hockey Hall of Famer Peter Forsberg or Los Angeles Kings goaltender Anton Forsberg, as well as Emil Forsberg and Chris Forsberg among others.

Outside of hockey, Forsberg is a fan of Liverpool FC and co-owns the Nashville SC in the Major League Soccer. He is also the co-owner of a female Italian racehorse named Trilly of Nando with fellow Swedish hockey player Jacob de la Rose.

Forsberg married country music singer Erin Alvey in July 2022 and they have one child together.

== Career statistics ==
=== Regular season and playoffs ===
			Regular season					Playoffs
Season	Team	League	GP	G	A	Pts	PIM	GP	G	A	Pts	PIM
2009–10	Leksands IF	J18	16	10	6	16	12	—	—	—	—	—
2009–10	Leksands IF	J18 Allsv	15	11	10	21	10	4	5	3	8	0
2009–10	Leksands IF	J20	—	—	—	—	—	5	0	0	0	0
2010–11	Leksands IF	J18	1	0	3	3	2	—	—	—	—	—
2010–11	Leksands IF	J18 Allsv	2	1	2	3	2	6	2	2	4	2
2010–11	Leksands IF	J20	36	21	19	40	22	—	—	—	—	—
2010–11	Leksands IF	Allsv	10	1	0	1	0	6	0	1	1	0
2011–12	Leksands IF	J18	1	0	2	2	0	—	—	—	—	—
2011–12	Leksands IF	J20	6	0	1	1	2	—	—	—	—	—
2011–12	Leksands IF	Allsv	43	8	9	17	33	10	2	1	3	0
2012–13	Leksands IF	Allsv	38	15	18	33	16	9	5	4	9	6
2012–13	Nashville Predators	NHL	5	0	1	1	0	—	—	—	—	—
2013–14	Nashville Predators	NHL	13	1	4	5	4	—	—	—	—	—
2013–14	Milwaukee Admirals	AHL	47	15	19	34	14	3	1	1	2	0
2014–15	Nashville Predators	NHL	82	26	37	63	24	6	4	2	6	4
2015–16	Nashville Predators	NHL	82	33	31	64	47	14	2	2	4	2
2016–17	Nashville Predators	NHL	82	31	27	58	32	22	9	7	16	14
2017–18	Nashville Predators	NHL	67	26	38	64	38	13	7	9	16	2
2018–19	Nashville Predators	NHL	64	28	22	50	26	6	1	1	2	6
2019–20	Nashville Predators	NHL	63	21	27	48	29	4	3	2	5	2
2020–21	Nashville Predators	NHL	39	12	20	32	16	6	2	1	3	4
2021–22	Nashville Predators	NHL	69	42	42	84	22	4	1	0	1	6
2022–23	Nashville Predators	NHL	50	19	23	42	20	—	—	—	—	—
2023–24	Nashville Predators	NHL	82	48	46	94	43	6	2	4	6	2
2024–25	Nashville Predators	NHL	82	31	45	76	44	—	—	—	—	—
2025–26	Nashville Predators	NHL	82	40	35	75	34	—	—	—	—	—
NHL totals			862	358	398	756	379	81	31	28	59	42

Medal record

Representing Sweden

Ice hockey

World Championships
Gold medal – first place	2018 Denmark	
Bronze medal – third place	2025 Sweden/Denmark	

World Junior Championships
Gold medal – first place	2012 Canada	
Silver medal – second place	2013 Russia	
Silver medal – second place	2014 Sweden	

IIHF World U18 Championship
Silver medal – second place	2011 Germany	
Silver medal – second place	2012 Czech Republic	

=== International ===
Year	Team	Event	Result	GP	G	A	Pts	PIM
2011	Sweden	U18	2nd place, silver medalist(s)	6	4	2	6	2
2011	Sweden	IH18	2nd place, silver medalist(s)	5	4	1	5	2
2012	Sweden	WJC	1st place, gold medalist(s)	6	0	1	1	2
2012	Sweden	U18	2nd place, silver medalist(s)	6	5	2	7	6
2013	Sweden	WJC	2nd place, silver medalist(s)	6	3	2	5	0
2014	Sweden	WJC	2nd place, silver medalist(s)	7	4	8	12	2
2015	Sweden	WC	5th	8	8	1	9	10
2016	Sweden	WCH	3rd	4	1	1	2	0
2018	Sweden	WC	1st place, gold medalist(s)	4	2	1	3	0
2025	Sweden	4NF	3rd	3	0	0	0	2
2025	Sweden	WC	3rd place, bronze medalist(s)	9	1	3	4	6
2026	Sweden	OG	7th	5	1	1	2	0
Junior totals				36	20	16	36	14
Senior totals				33	13	7	20	18

== Awards ==
NHL
NHL Rookie of the Month	November 2014
NHL All-Star Game	2015, 2024
NHL All-Rookie Team	2015
NHL Second All-Star Team	2024
International
World U-18 Best Forward	2012
World Junior Top Three Player on Team Sweden	2013
World Junior All-Star Team	2013, 2014
World Junior Best Forward	2014
World Junior MVP	2014

Awards and achievements
Preceded by Evgeny Kuznetsov	Washington Capitals first-round draft pick 2012	Succeeded by Tom Wilson
