= 2015 National Hockey League All-Star Game =

Professional ice hockey exhibition game

2015 NHL All-Star Game
	1	2	3	Total
Team Toews	4	7	6	17
Team Foligno	4	4	4	12
- Date: January 25, 2015
- Arena: Nationwide Arena
- City: Columbus
- MVP: Ryan Johansen (Columbus)
- Attendance: 18,901

The 2015 National Hockey League All-Star Game was an exhibition ice hockey game played on January 25, 2015. The game was held in Columbus, for the first time, at Nationwide Arena, home of the Columbus Blue Jackets. The team captains were chosen by NHL Hockey Operations: Nick Foligno of the All-Star Game-hosting Blue Jackets served as captain for the home team, and Jonathan Toews of the Chicago Blackhawks served for the away team. Team Toews won the game 17–12, as the teams and players broke a variety of All-Star Game scoring records.

Columbus was originally scheduled to host the All-Star Game on January 27, 2013. However, the game was postponed for two years, first because of the 2012–13 NHL lockout and then due to the league's participation in the 2014 Winter Olympics tournament.

== Fan voting ==
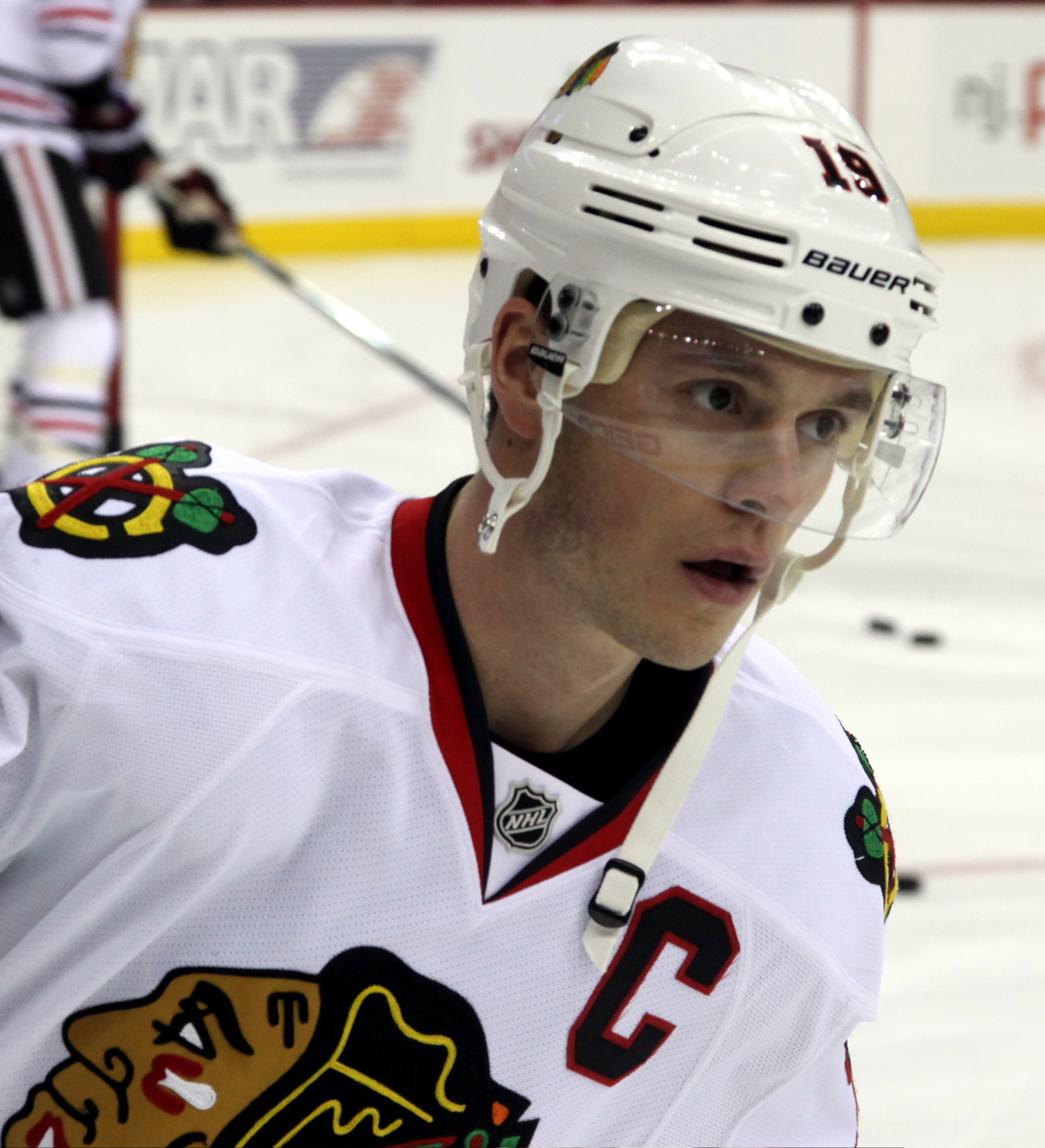
Jonathan Toews of the Chicago Blackhawks was voted into the All-Star Game and eventually selected to be a team captain.

On January 1, 2015, six players were voted into the All-Star Game over seven weeks of online voting. Five Chicago Blackhawks players were voted in: forwards Patrick Kane and Jonathan Toews, defensemen Duncan Keith and Brent Seabrook and goaltender Corey Crawford. The only player voted in as a member of a different team was forward Zemgus Girgensons of the Buffalo Sabres, who was the most voted overall due to a campaign in his native Latvia.

Players voted into the All-Star Game
Nat.	#	Player	Team	Pos.	Votes
(Latvia)	28	Zemgus Girgensons	Buffalo Sabres	C	1,574,896
(United States)	88	Patrick Kane	Chicago Blackhawks	RW	1,232,201
(Canada)	19	Jonathan Toews	Chicago Blackhawks	C	1,217,210
(Canada)	2	Duncan Keith	Chicago Blackhawks	D	1,198,173
(Canada)	50	Corey Crawford	Chicago Blackhawks	G	1,099,504
(Canada)	7	Brent Seabrook	Chicago Blackhawks	D	1,016,992

== Rosters ==
Peter Laviolette of the Nashville Predators and Darryl Sutter of the Los Angeles Kings were named coaches for the game on January 9, 2015. On January 14, 2015, the league announced the captains for the game would be Jonathan Toews and Nick Foligno. Being a player for the hometown Columbus Blue Jackets, Foligno's team was the home team. Drew Doughty and Patrick Kane served as alternate captains for Team Foligno while Ryan Getzlaf and Rick Nash served the same role for Team Toews.

A draft to select teams was held two days prior to the game, on January 23, 2015. The captains and alternate captains from each team sat together and selected players throughout 18 rounds. In past years, the last player picked would receive a new car; during this draft, the final two picks Ryan Nugent-Hopkins and Filip Forsberg were voted onto their teams by online fan voting and as a result, both players received 2015 Honda Accords. The rules during the draft required all goaltenders to have been selected by the end of the 10th round and all defensemen by the end of the 15th.

Team Foligno (Home)
Entry	Nat.	Player	Team	Pos.	#
C	(United States)	Nick Foligno	Columbus Blue Jackets	LW	71
A	(United States)	Patrick Kane	Chicago Blackhawks	RW	88
A	(Canada)	Drew Doughty	Los Angeles Kings	D	8
1	(Canada)	Ryan Johansen	Columbus Blue Jackets	C	19
3	(Canada)	Duncan Keith	Chicago Blackhawks	D	2
5	(Slovenia)	Anze Kopitar	Los Angeles Kings	C	11
7	(Canada)	Steven Stamkos	Tampa Bay Lightning	C	91
9	(United States)	Phil Kessel (Note: A trade was made by Team Foligno, sending Tyler Seguin to Team Toews in exchange for Phil Kessel.)	Toronto Maple Leafs	RW	81
11	(Canada)	Carey Price	Montreal Canadiens	G	31
13	(Canada)	Claude Giroux	Philadelphia Flyers	C	28
15	(United States)	Dustin Byfuglien	Winnipeg Jets	D	33
17	(Canada)	Marc-Andre Fleury	Pittsburgh Penguins	G	29
19	(Canada)	Brian Elliott	St. Louis Blues	G	1
21	(Canada)	Brent Burns	San Jose Sharks	D	88
23	(Canada)	Jonathan Drouin (Note: Rookies only competed for their respective teams in the NHL All-Star Skills Competition on Saturday, Jan. 24.)	Tampa Bay Lightning	LW	27
23	(Czech Republic)	Jiri Sekac	Montreal Canadiens	LW	26
25	(United States)	Kevin Shattenkirk	St. Louis Blues	D	22
27	(United States)	Bobby Ryan	Ottawa Senators	RW	6
29	(Czech Republic)	Radim Vrbata	Vancouver Canucks	RW	17
31	(Sweden)	Oliver Ekman-Larsson	Arizona Coyotes	D	23
33	(Latvia)	Zemgus Girgensons	Buffalo Sabres	C	28
35	(Russia)	Alexander Ovechkin	Washington Capitals	LW	8
36	(Canada)	Ryan Nugent-Hopkins	Edmonton Oilers	C	93

Team Toews (Away)
Entry	Nat.	Player	Team	Pos.	#
C	(Canada)	Jonathan Toews	Chicago Blackhawks	C	19
A	(Canada)	Ryan Getzlaf	Anaheim Ducks	C	15
A	(Canada)	Rick Nash	New York Rangers	LW	61
2	(Canada)	Tyler Seguin	Dallas Stars	C	91
4	(Canada)	Shea Weber	Nashville Predators	D	6
6	(Czech Republic)	Jakub Voracek	Philadelphia Flyers	RW	93
8	(Canada)	Corey Crawford	Chicago Blackhawks	G	50
10	(Canada)	John Tavares	New York Islanders	C	91
12	(Canada)	Roberto Luongo	Florida Panthers	G	1
14	(Canada)	Brent Seabrook	Chicago Blackhawks	D	7
16	(Russia)	Vladimir Tarasenko	St. Louis Blues	RW	91
18	(Canada)	Patrice Bergeron	Boston Bruins	C	37
20	(Slovakia)	Jaroslav Halak	New York Islanders	G	41
22	(United States)	Johnny Gaudreau	Calgary Flames	LW	13
22	(Canada)	Mike Hoffman	Ottawa Senators	LW	68
24	(Canada)	Aaron Ekblad	Florida Panthers	D	5
26	(Czech Republic)	Patrik Elias	New Jersey Devils	C	26
28	(United States)	Ryan Suter	Minnesota Wild	D	20
30	(Canada)	Mark Giordano	Calgary Flames	D	5
32	(United States)	Justin Faulk	Carolina Hurricanes	D	27
36	(Sweden)	Filip Forsberg	Nashville Predators	C	9

=== Rookies ===
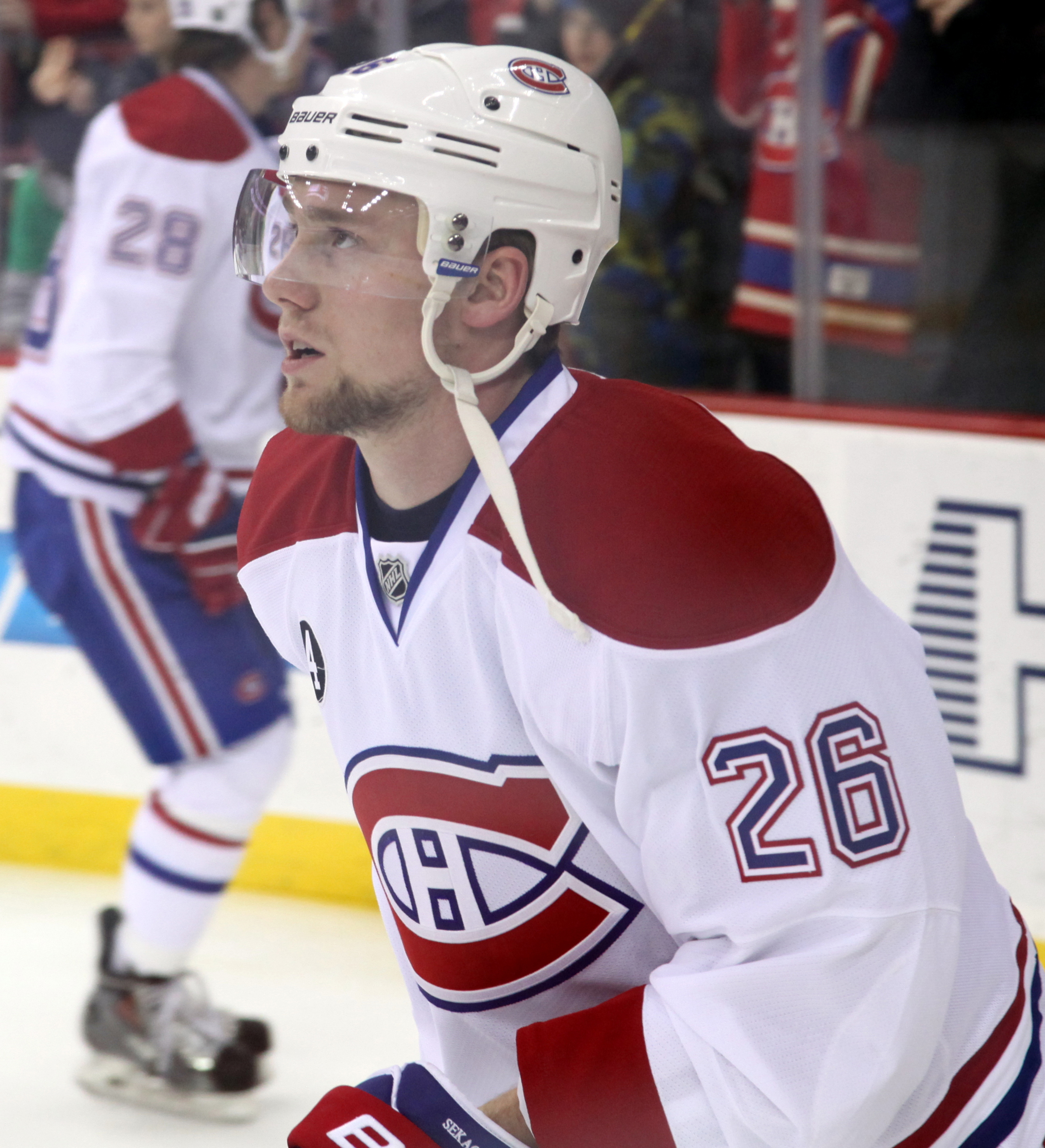
Jiri Sekac of the Montreal Canadiens was selected as one of six rookies to take place in the All-Star Skills Competition.

The rookies only competed in the NHL All-Star Skills Competition on Saturday, Jan. 24, with the exception of Ekblad, Forsberg and Gaudreau, who were promoted to the All-Star Game as injury replacements.

All-Star Skills Competition Rookies
Nat.	Player	Team	Pos.	Num.
(United States)	Johnny Gaudreau	Calgary Flames	LW	13
(Czech Republic)	Jiri Sekac	Montreal Canadiens	LW	26
(Sweden)	Filip Forsberg	Nashville Predators	C	9
(Canada)	Mike Hoffman	Ottawa Senators	LW	68
(Canada)	Jonathan Drouin	Tampa Bay Lightning	LW	27
(Canada)	Aaron Ekblad	Florida Panthers	D	5

=== Withdrawn ===
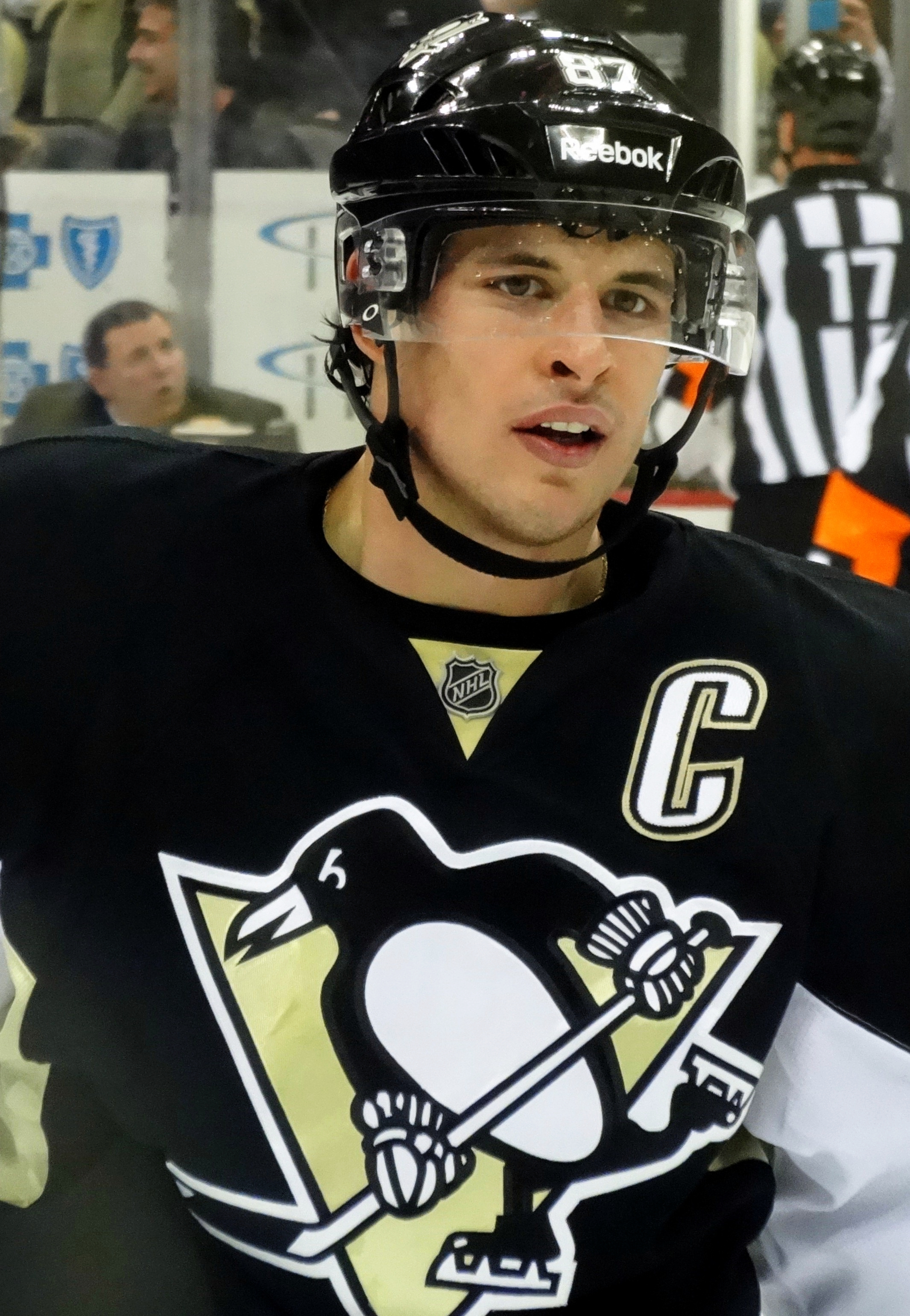
A lower-body injury led Sidney Crosby to miss a fifth-straight All-Star Game.

Prior to the draft, seven players withdrew due to injuries. Only six of seven withdrawn players were replaced by the beginning of the All-Star weekend, leaving an uneven number of players to compete in the All-Star Game. Ultimately, it was Team Toews who had one less player after the draft. Although Sidney Crosby originally did not have a replacement named, it was later decided that skills competition rookie Johnny Gaudreau would take his spot in the game. Three withdrawn players were eventually replaced by rookies who were originally slated to only participate in the skills competitions, while four others were replaced by other NHL players assigned to the Game by the league. The day of the game, Tyler Johnson withdrew due to a lower-body injury; although already having been selected to Team Toews, a replacement was not named and the team's roster remained reduced by two players.

All-Star Game Withdrawn Players
Nat.	Name	Team	Pos.	Reason and replacement
(Canada)	Tanner Pearson	Los Angeles Kings	LW	Broken leg, replaced by Jiri Sekac
(United States)	Jimmy Howard	Detroit Red Wings	G	Groin injury, replaced by Marc-Andre Fleury
(Finland)	Pekka Rinne	Nashville Predators	G	Sprained knee, replaced by Jaroslav Halak
(Russia)	Sergei Bobrovsky	Columbus Blue Jackets	G	Groin injury, replaced by Brian Elliott
(Russia)	Evgeni Malkin	Pittsburgh Penguins	C	Lower-body injury, replaced by Filip Forsberg
(Canada)	Sidney Crosby	Pittsburgh Penguins	C	Lower-body injury, replaced by Johnny Gaudreau
(United States)	Erik Johnson	Colorado Avalanche	D	Lower-body injury, replaced by Aaron Ekblad
(United States)	Tyler Johnson	Tampa Bay Lightning	C	Lower-body injury, no replacement (Note: Johnson was selected to Team Toews as the 34th entry at the draft but withdrew the day of the game)

== Uniforms ==
For the first All-Star Game in three years, Reebok sought to do something a bit different. Instead of traditional color designs, Reebok chose to incorporate a color they referred to as "elite green" as the primary trim color of their uniforms for this game. The color had been in use on the inside collars of the Reebok Edge jersey, but this marked its first (and, to date, only) use as a visible uniform color. Following on the use of chromed logos in the 2014 NHL Stadium Series, the NHL shields on the front of the All-Star uniforms were also given a chrome treatment, with two stars added inside the NHL shield to represent the two conferences (despite the game not using a conference format).

== Game summary ==
January 25, 2015	Team Toews	17–12	Team Foligno	Nationwide Arena	Recap

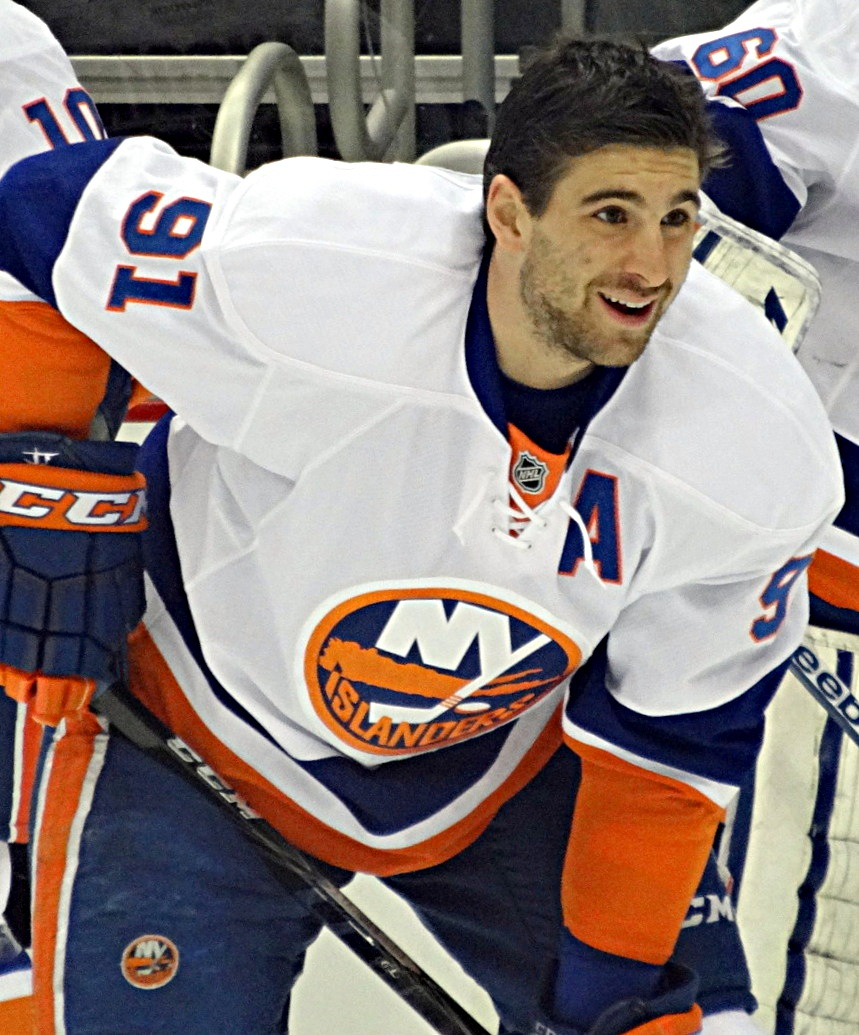
John Tavares (c. 2013) scored four goals for Team Toews, becoming the sixth player in NHL history to do so in an All-Star Game.

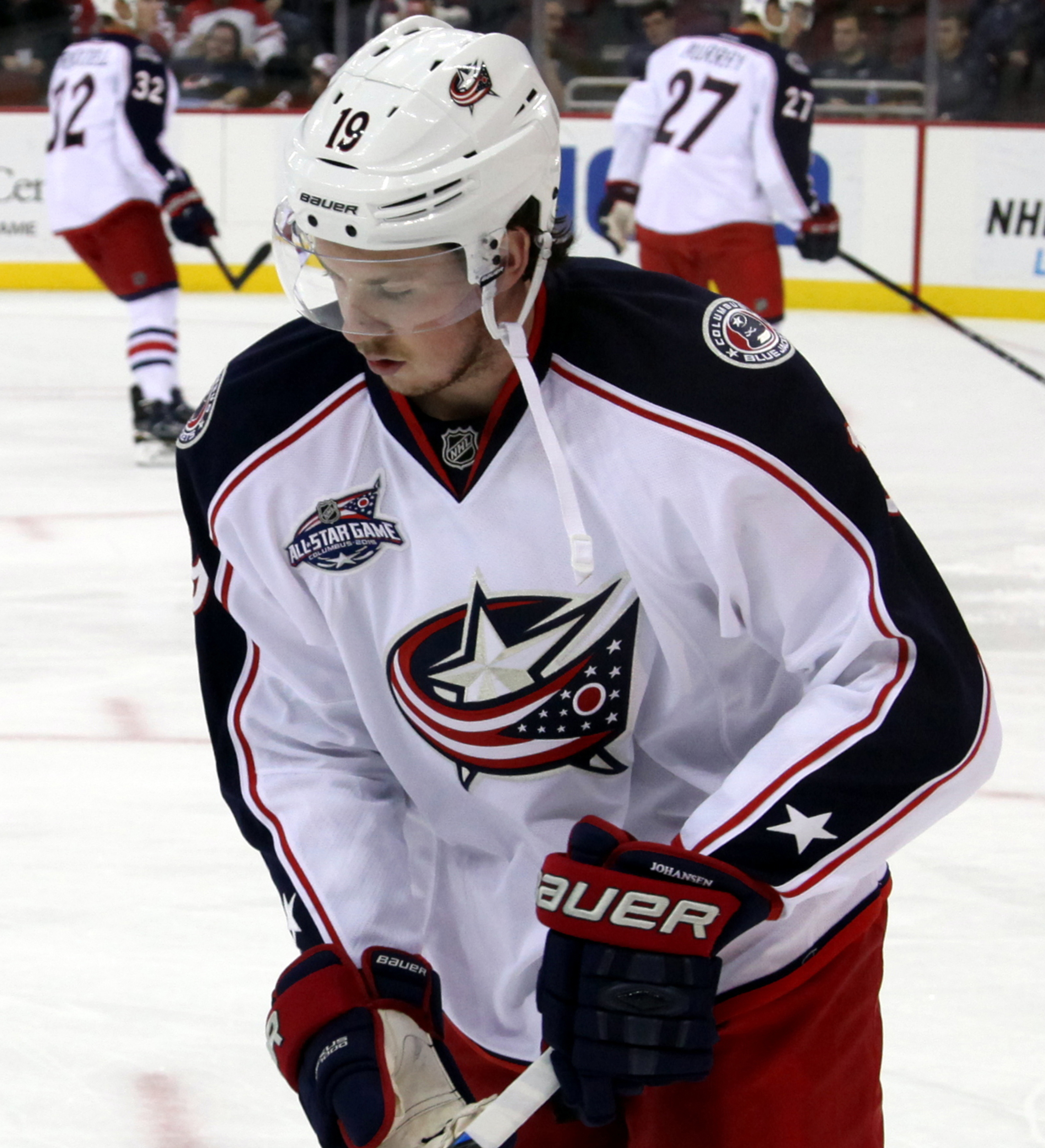
Ryan Johansen scored two goals and assisted on two others for Team Foligno en route to winning the game's online MVP vote.

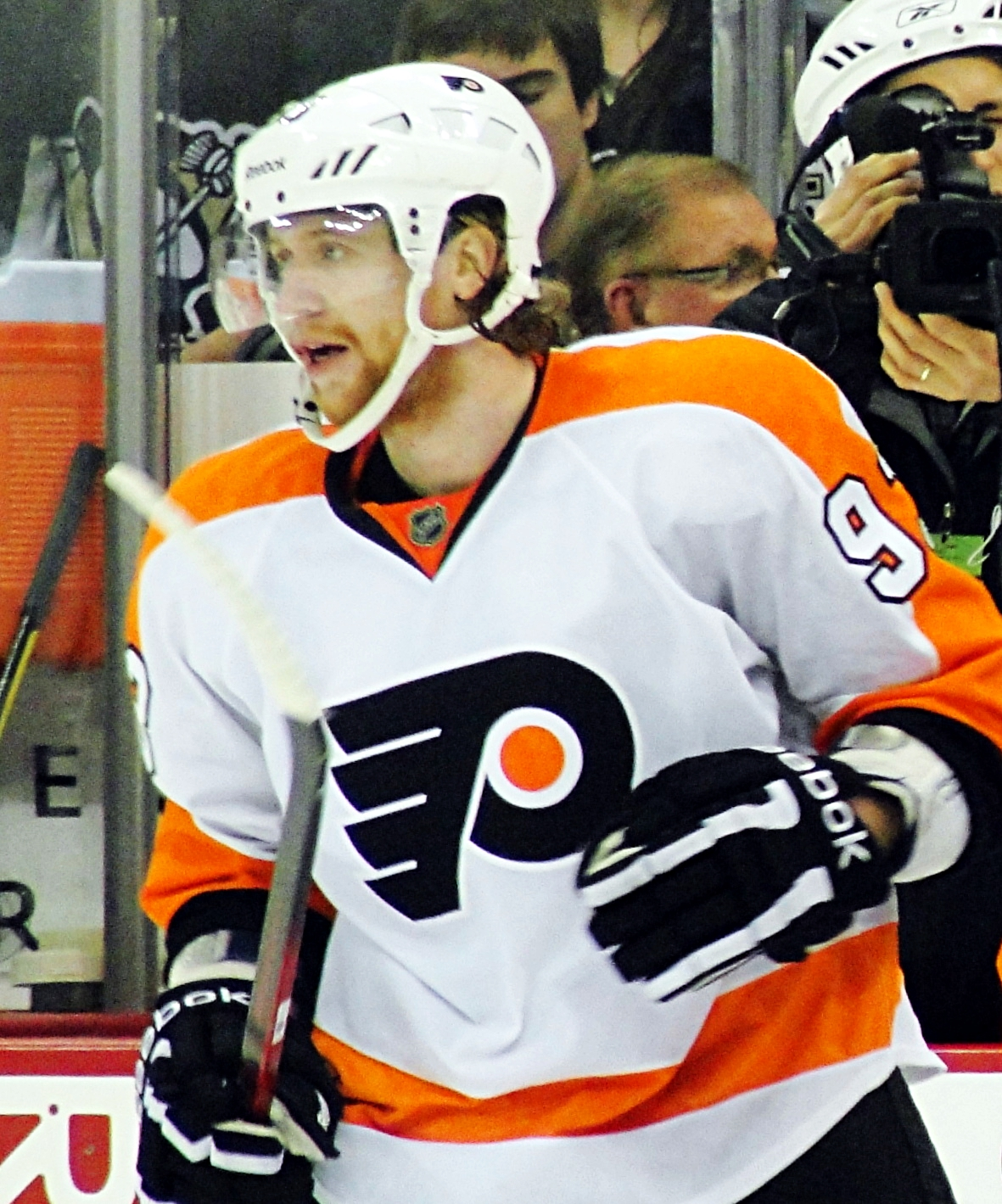
Jakub Voracek had three goals and three assists for Team Toews, tying a record for most points (6) in an All-Star Game.

The game was played from 5 pm until 8 pm, local Eastern Time. It was broadcast nationally in Canada on CBC and in the United States on NBCSN. Locksley, Fall Out Boy and O.A.R. performed before the game and during intermissions one and two, respectively. Columbus Blue Jackets anthem singer Leo Welsh sang a bilingual version of the Canadian national anthem while country singer Jo Dee Messina sang the American national anthem. The referees for the game were Chris Rooney and Chris Lee, while Tony Sericolo and Steve Miller served as linesman.

Team Toews won the game by a score of 17–12, setting a new record for most goals by a team in an All-Star Game, surpassing the previous record of 16 set in the 1993 game by the Wales Conference team. Every skater on the winning team recorded at least one point during the game. The two teams combined for a total of 29 goals, besting the previous record of 26 set in the 2001 game between teams North America and World. Another record broken was the number of second period goals, as the 11 total goals was one higher than the previous record of 10, achieved four times (most recently in 2009). At the end of the game, Ryan Johansen of the hometown Columbus Blue Jackets won the most valuable player award by result of an online fan vote.

New York Islanders captain John Tavares scored four goals, becoming only the sixth player in All-Star game history to score that many in a game, and the first since Dany Heatley in 2003. Jakub Voracek of the Philadelphia Flyers scored six points (three goals and three assists) which tied a record set by Mario Lemieux. A record was also broken for quickest back-to-back goals by Minnesota Wild defenseman Ryan Suter and Flyers' captain Claude Giroux, after they scored eight seconds apart.

Scoring summary
Team	Goal	Assist(s)	Time	Score
1st period: Roberto Luongo (Team Toews) vs. Carey Price (Team Foligno)
Foligno	Radim Vrbata (1)	Ryan Nugent-Hopkins (1)	03:09	1–0 Foligno
Toews	Ryan Getzlaf (1)	Vladimir Tarasenko (1) and Justin Faulk (1)	06:33	1–1 Tie
Toews	Jakub Voracek (1)	Jonathan Toews (1) and Aaron Ekblad (1)	09:51	2–1 Toews
Foligno	Ryan Johansen (1)	Nick Foligno (1) and Kevin Shattenkirk (1)	11:05	2–2 Tie
Toews	Patrice Bergeron (1)	Tyler Seguin (1) and Patrik Elias (1)	12:17	3–2 Toews
Foligno	Kevin Shattenkirk (1)	Ryan Nugent-Hopkins (2) and Radim Vrbata (1)	14:48	3–3 Tie
Foligno	Ryan Johansen (2)	Alexander Ovechkin (1) and Dustin Byfuglien (1)	16:24	4–3 Foligno
Toews	John Tavares (1)	Patrice Bergeron (1) and Aaron Ekblad (2)	19:03	4–4 Tie
2nd period: Corey Crawford (Team Toews) vs. Marc-Andre Fleury (Team Foligno)
Toews	Ryan Suter (1)	Vladimir Tarasenko (2) and Tyler Seguin (2)	00:24	5–4 Toews
Foligno	Claude Giroux (1)	Patrick Kane (1)	00:32	5–5 Tie
Toews	Tyler Seguin (1)	Ryan Getzlaf (1) and Vladimir Tarasenko (3)	01:22	6–5 Toews
Foligno	Steven Stamkos (1)	Duncan Keith (1)	02:27	6–6 Tie
Toews	Rick Nash (1)	Jonathan Toews (2) and Jakub Voracek (1)	04:08	7–6 Toews
Toews	Filip Forsberg (1)	Johnny Gaudreau (1) and Patrik Elias (2)	05:56	8–6 Toews
Toews	John Tavares (2)	Patrice Bergeron (2) and Justin Faulk (2)	08:16	9–6 Toews
Toews	Jakub Voracek (2)	Jonathan Toews (3) and Aaron Ekblad (3)	09:22	10–6 Toews
Foligno	Nick Foligno (1)	Ryan Johansen (1) and Alexander Ovechkin (2)	11:59	10–7 Toews
Foligno	Steven Stamkos (2)	Bobby Ryan (1)	16:35	10–8 Toews
Toews	John Tavares (3)	Patrice Bergeron (3)	19:00	11–8 Toews
3rd period: Jaroslav Halak (Team Toews) vs. Brian Elliott (Team Foligno)
Toews	Rick Nash (2)	Mark Giordano (1) and Jakub Voracek (2)	01:29	12–8 Toews
Foligno	Patrick Kane (1)	Claude Giroux (1) and Drew Doughty (1)	02:15	12–9 Toews
Toews	John Tavares (4)	Patrice Bergeron (4) and Brent Seabrook (1)	06:13	13–9 Toews
Toews	Jakub Voracek (3)	Jonathan Toews (4) and Aaron Ekblad (4)	07:30	14–9 Toews
Foligno	Bobby Ryan (1)	Steven Stamkos (1) and Oliver Ekman-Larsson (1)	08:23	14–10 Toews
Toews	Tyler Seguin (2)	Vladimir Tarasenko (4) and Shea Weber (1)	09:26	15–10 Toews
Foligno	Patrick Kane (2)	Brent Burns (1) and Claude Giroux (2)	13:09	15–11 Toews
Toews	Jonathan Toews (1)	Ryan Suter (1)	14:21	16–11 Toews
Toews	Filip Forsberg (2)	Johnny Gaudreau (2) and Jakub Voracek (3)	16:40	17–11 Toews
Foligno	Brent Burns (1)	Alexander Ovechkin (3) and Ryan Johansen (2)	18:20	17–12 Toews

Penalty summary
Period	Team	Player	Penalty	Time	PIM
1st	None				
2nd	None				
3rd	None				

Shots by period
Team	1	2	3	Total
Toews	16	16	15	47
Foligno	17	18	10	45

Power play opportunities
Team	Goals/Opportunities
Toews	0/0
Foligno	0/0

MVP selection
Team	Player	Statistics
Foligno	Ryan Johansen	2 Goals, 2 Assists

=== Records set ===
The following records were set or tied during the game:

- Most goals by a single team: 17, Team Toews (previously 16)
- Most goals scored in total: 29 (previously 26)
- Most goals in a single period: 11 (previously 10)
- Most goals in a single period by one team: 7, Team Toews, 2nd period (tied with Team Wales, 1990, 1st period)
- Most goals by a single player: 4, John Tavares (tied with Wayne Gretzky, Mario Lemieux, Vincent Damphousse, Mike Gartner and Dany Heatley)
- Most points by a single player: 6, Jakub Voracek (tied with Mario Lemieux)
- Fastest back-to-back goals
- Fastest 3 goals scored
- Fastest 4 goals scored
