= Aaron Ekblad =

Canadian ice hockey player (born 1996)

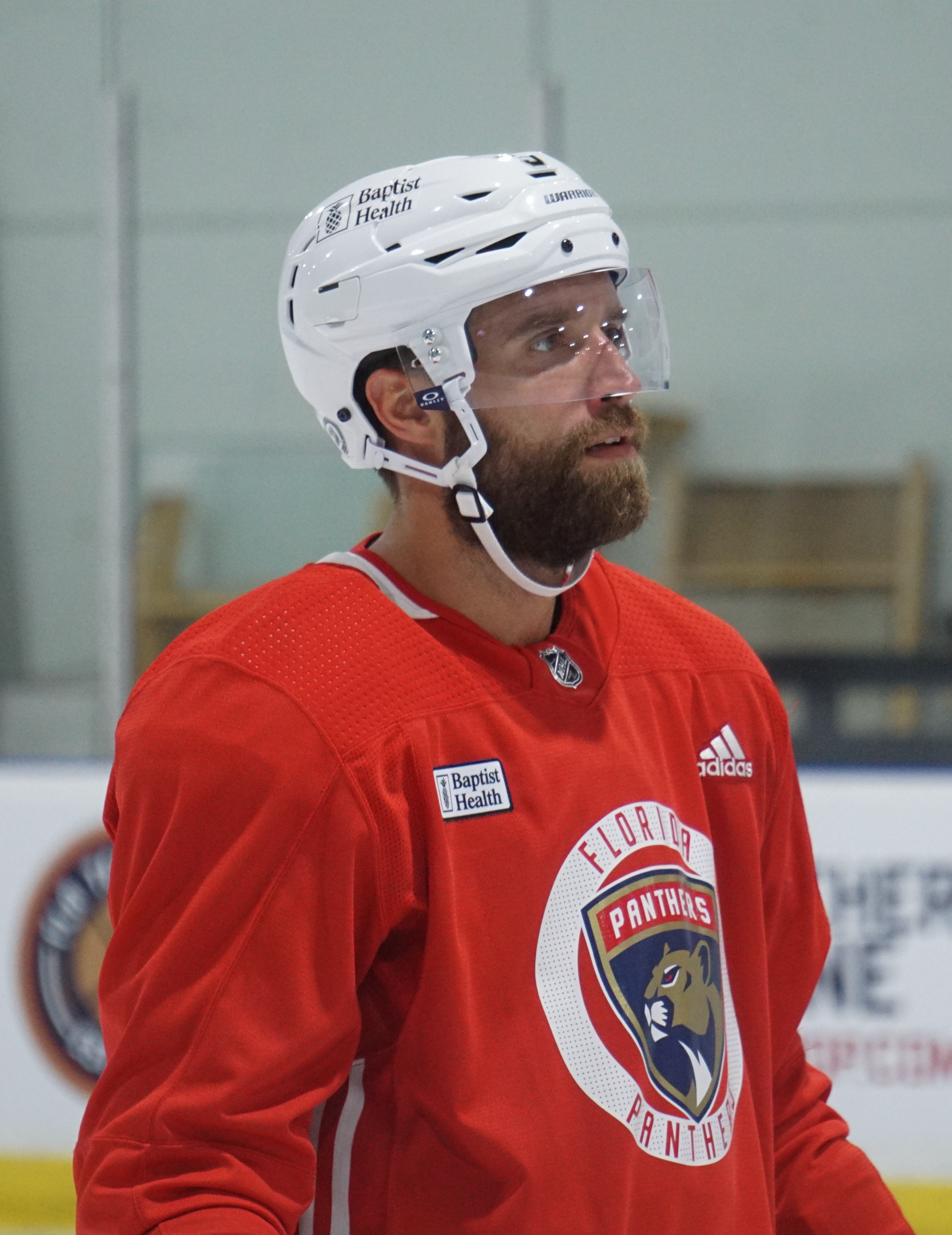
- Ekblad with the Florida Panthers in 2023
- Born: February 7, 1996 (age 30) Windsor, Ontario, Canada
- Height: 6 ft 4 in (193 cm)
- Weight: 220 lb (100 kg; 15 st 10 lb)
- Position: Defence
- Shoots: Right
- NHL team: Florida Panthers
- National team: Canada
- NHL draft: 1st overall, 2014; Florida Panthers
- Playing career: 2014–present

Aaron Ekblad (born February 7, 1996) is a Canadian professional ice hockey player who is a defenceman and alternate captain for the Florida Panthers in the National Hockey League (NHL). Ekblad was selected first overall in the 2011 Ontario Hockey League (OHL) draft, and he was selected first overall by the Panthers in the 2014 NHL entry draft and made his NHL debut that year. In his first NHL season, Ekblad was selected for the 2015 NHL All-Star Game and earned the Calder Memorial Trophy as the league's best rookie in the 2014–15. Ekblad won back-to-back Stanley Cup championships with the Panthers in 2024 and 2025.

Prior to joining the NHL, Ekblad played major junior ice hockey for the Barrie Colts of the OHL. He was granted exceptional player status unanimously by Hockey Canada, which allowed him to play in major junior level a year early. Ekblad is the leader in games played and points scored by a defenceman in Florida Panthers franchise history.

== Playing career ==
=== Amateur ===
In 2010–11, Ekblad competed for the Sun County Panthers minor midget AAA team in Belle River, Ontario. He had 34 points in 30 regular season games and added 21 points in 18 playoff games. He captained the team and led them to an alliance championship.

Ekblad's application to be the only player born in 1996 in the Ontario Hockey League (OHL) draft was approved unanimously, after a six-week review by Hockey Canada. With the approval, Ekblad became the first defenceman ever granted exceptional player status. The status allowed him to compete in the OHL a year earlier than his eligible age. The only other players to have been given such eligibility are John Tavares in 2005, Connor McDavid in 2012, Sean Day in 2013, Joe Veleno in 2015, Shane Wright in 2019, Connor Bedard in 2020 and Michael Misa in 2022.

In the 2014 OHL Coaches Poll, he won top honours in four different categories in the Eastern Conference of the OHL, earning first-place finishes for best shot, hardest shot, best offensive defenceman, and best defensive defenceman. He was also voted second in the category of best penalty killer, behind Oshawa Generals forward Scott Laughton.

=== Professional ===
Ekblad was selected first overall in the 2014 NHL entry draft by the Florida Panthers on June 27, 2014. He subsequently signed a three-year, entry-level deal with the Panthers on September 3. After making the Panthers' opening night roster out of training camp for the 2014–15 season, Ekblad made his NHL debut on October 9, against the Tampa Bay Lightning. In the game, he scored his first NHL point, an assist on a Jonathan Huberdeau goal, in Florida's eventual 3–2 loss in overtime. Ekblad later scored his first NHL goal on November 1, against Steve Mason of the Philadelphia Flyers in a 2–1 win.

On December 6, in a game against the Buffalo Sabres, Ekblad scored a career-high three points in a 3–2 Panthers victory, the first Panthers rookie to record a three-point game since Dan Boyle during the 1998–99 season. Ekblad was also named the game's first star for his performance. On January 23, 2015, Ekblad was named as an injury replacement for Colorado Avalanche defenceman Erik Johnson at the 2015 NHL All-Star Game. In the game, Ekblad recorded four assists for Team Toews in their 17–12 victory over Team Foligno.

Ekblad finished his rookie season with 12 goals and 27 assists (39 points) in 81 games played for Florida. Following the conclusion of his rookie season, Ekblad led all rookie defencemen in goals, power play goals (6), power play points (13), shots (170) and fewest shot attempts against per 60 minutes (38.04). He also finished second in assists, plus-minus (+12), hits (109) and blocked shots (80), while also averaging 21:48 of ice time per game. Ekblad also set a new franchise record for rookie defencemen in goals, assists, and points, surpassing Ed Jovanovski. On April 23, Ekblad was named one of three finalists for the Calder Memorial Trophy – awarded annually to the NHL's rookie of the year – along with Mark Stone of the Ottawa Senators and Johnny Gaudreau of the Calgary Flames. On June 24, Ekblad was announced as Calder Memorial Trophy's winner.

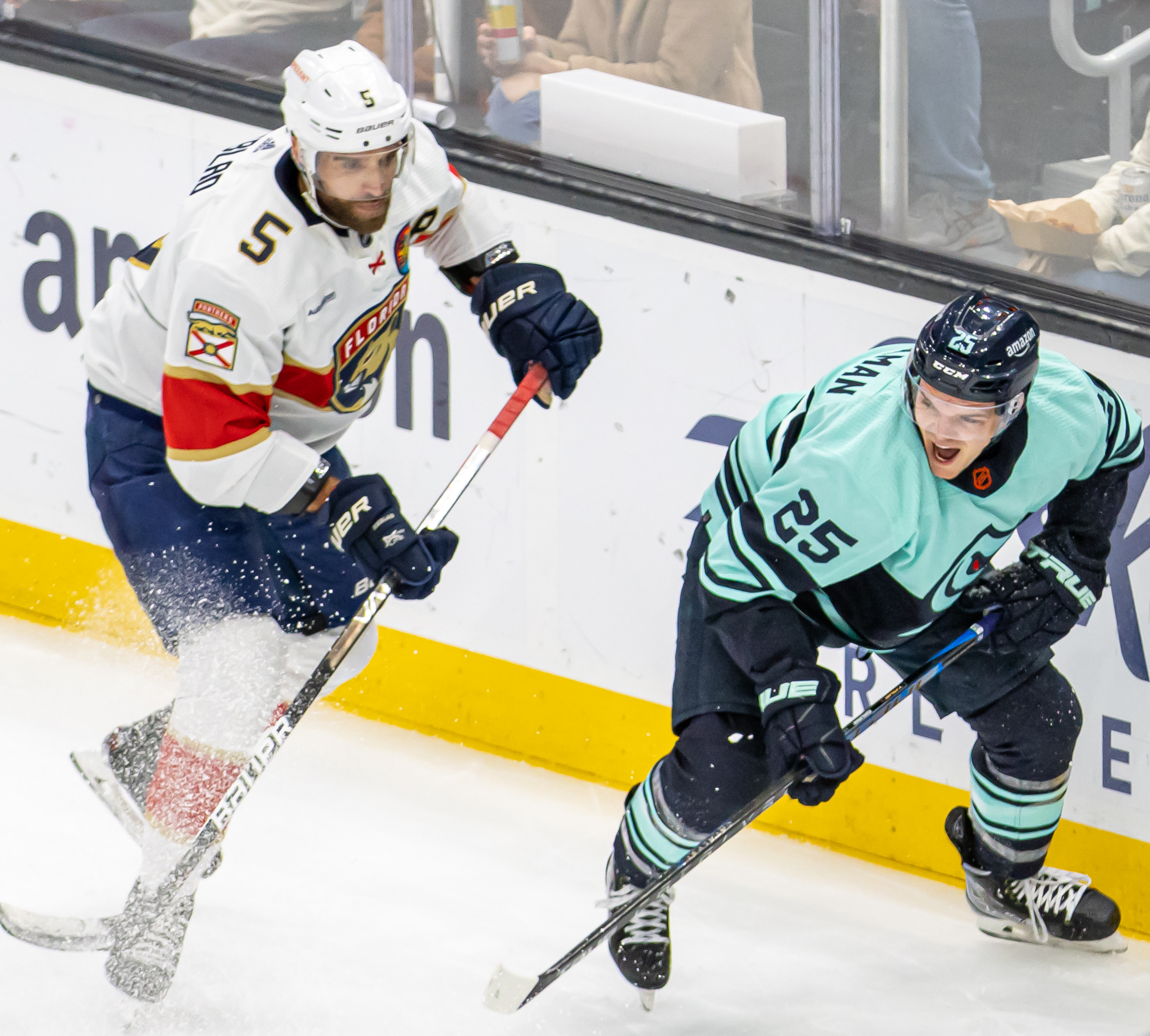
Ekblad with the Florida Panthers in 2022.

During the following season, Ekblad missed four games in January 2016 to recover from a concussion he had endured from a hit delivered by Matt Hendricks of the Edmonton Oilers. Hendricks was suspended three games for the hit.

On July 2, 2016, Ekblad and the Panthers agreed to an eight-year, $60 million extension. He was also named an alternate captain. During the 2016–17 season, Ekblad suffered another concussion during a game against the Tampa Bay Lightning and missed four games.

On February 3, 2018, Ekblad became the 15th defenceman in NHL history to reach double-digits in goals in each of his first four seasons.

On March 28, 2021, Ekblad was stretchered off the ice following a collision with Dallas Stars' defenceman Esa Lindell. He underwent surgery to repair a left leg fracture the following day and was ruled out for 12 weeks, effectively ending his season.

On March 18, 2022, Ekblad recorded three assists in a 5–3 loss against the Vegas Golden Knights, giving him 291 career points, the most by a defenceman in Panthers franchise history, surpassing Róbert Švehla. On December 16, Ekblad played his 574th NHL game, a 4–2 loss to the Pittsburgh Penguins, surpassing Švehla for most games played by a defenceman in Panthers' history.

On June 24, 2024, Ekblad won the Stanley Cup when the Panthers won the seventh game of the 2024 Stanley Cup Final.

On March 10, 2025, Ekblad was suspended 20 games for violating the NHL's performance-enhancing drug use policy after failing a random drug test. He became the first NHL player to be suspended for the use of performance enhancing drugs since Nate Schmidt in 2018. In a statement, Ekblad claimed that he failed the test after taking something which he did not specify to help recover from an injury without checking with team personnel; he did not appeal the suspension. Ekblad helped the Panthers win the Stanley Cup for the second straight time in the 2025 Stanley Cup Final.

On June 30, 2025, Ekblad and the Panthers agreed to an eight-year, $48.8 million extension. The signing was viewed as a significant discount from Ekblad to remain with the Panthers and continue to contend for future championships, with Ekblad's contract being a yearly paycut from his previous deal after it was expected that he would sign a contract worth several million more in unrestricted free agency.

== International play ==
Medal record

Men's ice hockey

Representing Canada

World Championships
Gold medal – first place	2015 Czech Republic	

Ivan Hlinka Memorial Tournament
Gold medal – first place	2013 Czech Republic	

During Canada junior team's training camp in August 2014 in preparation for the upcoming 2015 World Junior Championships, Ekblad suffered a concussion in an exhibition game against the Czech Republic junior team.

Ekblad played for Canada senior team at the 2015 World Championship, where they won the gold medal for the first time since 2007 with a perfect 10–0 record.

Ekblad was invited to the play for Team North America at the 2016 World Cup of Hockey. Team North America was a newly-formed team that consisted of ice hockey players aged 23 or younger. He was later named an alternate captain along with Sean Couturier. During the tournament, he suffered an upper body injury and had to leave the team early.

On April 12, 2018, Ekblad was named to Canada senior team to compete at the 2018 World Championship.

== Personal life ==
Ekblad's brother Darien, a goaltender, was drafted into the OHL by the London Knights. Ekblad attended Innisdale Secondary School and was an honour roll student in the Simcoe County District School Board. Ekblad was born in Windsor, but grew up in Belle River, Ontario. His great-grandfather was Swedish, hence the last name "Ekblad".

During his rookie year, Ekblad lived with veteran Willie Mitchell and his family.

== Career statistics ==
=== Regular season and playoffs ===
			Regular season					Playoffs
Season	Team	League	GP	G	A	Pts	PIM	GP	G	A	Pts	PIM
2011–12	Barrie Colts	OHL	63	10	19	29	34	13	2	3	5	8
2012–13	Barrie Colts	OHL	54	7	27	34	64	22	7	10	17	28
2013–14	Barrie Colts	OHL	58	23	30	53	91	9	2	4	6	14
2014–15	Florida Panthers	NHL	81	12	27	39	32	—	—	—	—	—
2015–16	Florida Panthers	NHL	78	15	21	36	41	6	0	1	1	0
2016–17	Florida Panthers	NHL	68	10	11	21	58	—	—	—	—	—
2017–18	Florida Panthers	NHL	82	16	22	38	71	—	—	—	—	—
2018–19	Florida Panthers	NHL	82	13	24	37	47	—	—	—	—	—
2019–20	Florida Panthers	NHL	67	5	36	41	26	4	0	0	0	2
2020–21	Florida Panthers	NHL	35	11	11	22	33	—	—	—	—	—
2021–22	Florida Panthers	NHL	61	15	42	57	26	10	1	4	5	11
2022–23	Florida Panthers	NHL	71	14	24	38	68	20	2	6	8	20
2023–24	Florida Panthers	NHL	51	4	14	18	50	24	1	5	6	16
2024–25	Florida Panthers	NHL	56	3	30	33	53	19	4	9	13	38
2025–26	Florida Panthers	NHL	72	4	22	26	55	—	—	—	—	—
NHL totals			804	122	284	406	560	83	8	25	33	87

=== International ===
Year	Team	Event	Results	GP	G	A	Pts	PIM
2012	Canada Ontario	U17	3rd place, bronze medalist(s)	5	1	2	3	4
2013	Canada Ontario	U17	6th	5	2	4	6	4
2013	Canada	IH18	1st place, gold medalist(s)	5	2	2	4	4
2014	Canada	WJC	4th	7	1	1	2	2
2015	Canada	WC	1st place, gold medalist(s)	10	4	3	7	6
2016	Team North America	WCH	5th	1	0	0	0	0
2018	Canada	WC	4th	10	1	5	6	6
Junior totals				22	6	9	15	14
Senior totals				20	5	8	13	12

== Awards and honours ==
Award	Year	Ref
OHL
Jack Ferguson Award	2011	
Emms Family Award	2012	
Max Kaminsky Trophy	2014	
First All-Star Team	2014	
NHL
NHL All-Star Game	2015, 2016	
Calder Memorial Trophy	2015	
NHL All-Rookie Team	2015	
Stanley Cup champion	2024, 2025	

Awards and achievements
Preceded by Nail Yakupov	Winner of the Emms Family Award; 2011–12	Succeeded by Connor McDavid
Preceded by Alex Galchenyuk	Winner of the Jack Ferguson Award; 2011	Succeeded by Connor McDavid
Preceded by Nathan MacKinnon	NHL first overall draft pick 2014	Succeeded by Connor McDavid
Preceded by Aleksander Barkov	Florida Panthers first round draft pick 2014	Succeeded by Lawson Crouse
Preceded by Nathan MacKinnon	Winner of the Calder Trophy; 2015	Succeeded by Artemi Panarin
