= Ryan Johansen =

Canadian ice hockey player (born 1992)

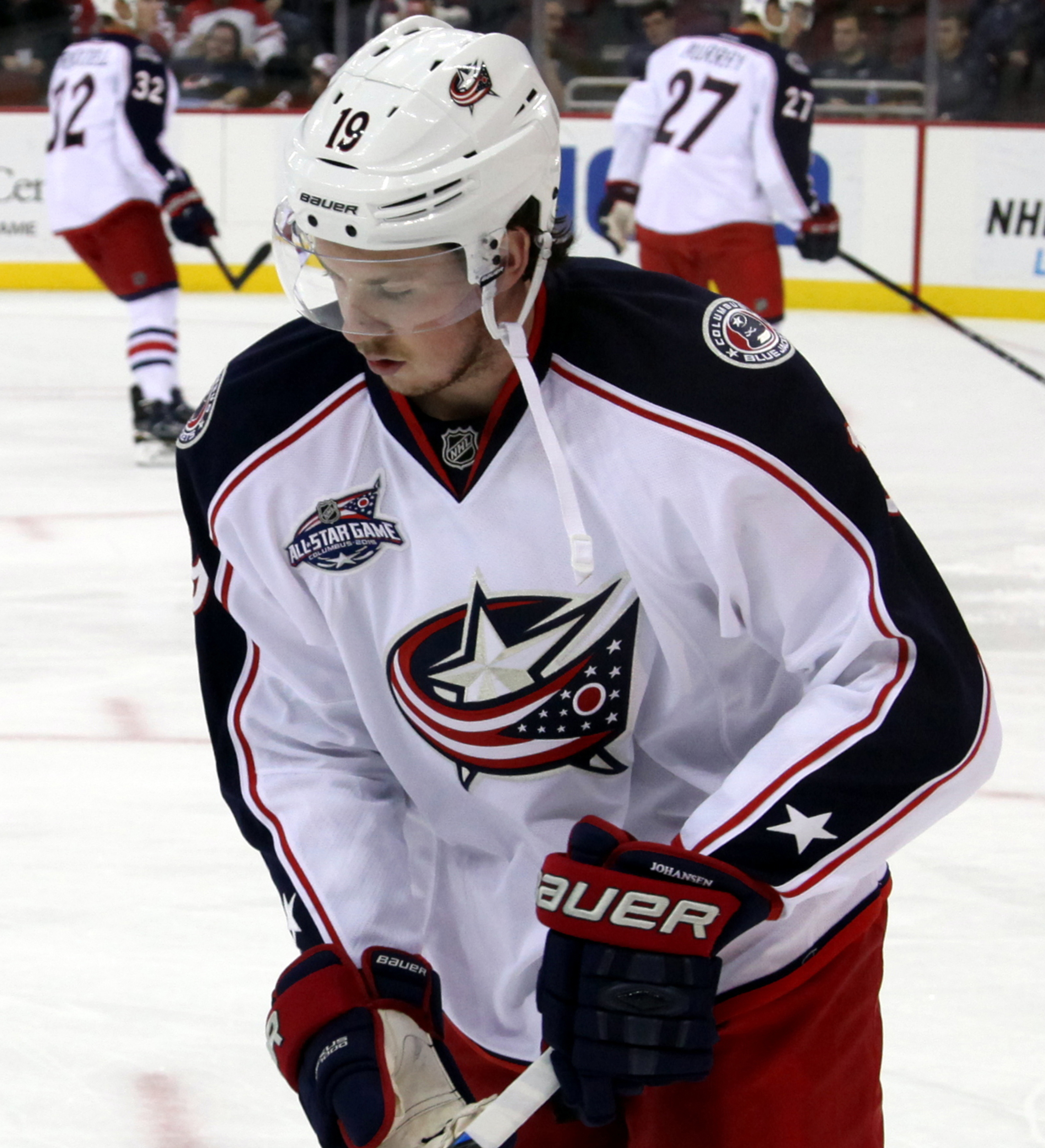
- Johansen with the Columbus Blue Jackets in 2014
- Born: July 31, 1992 (age 34) Vancouver, British Columbia, Canada
- Height: 6 ft 3 in (191 cm)
- Weight: 218 lb (99 kg; 15 st 8 lb)
- Position: Centre
- Shot: Right
- Played for: Columbus Blue Jackets; Nashville Predators; Colorado Avalanche
- NHL draft: 4th overall, 2010; Columbus Blue Jackets
- Playing career: 2011–2024

Ryan Johansen (born July 31, 1992) is a Canadian former professional ice hockey player. A centre, he played minor hockey in the Greater Vancouver area until joining the junior ranks with the Penticton Vees of the British Columbia Hockey League (BCHL) for one season. In 2009–10, he moved to the major junior level with the Portland Winterhawks of the Western Hockey League (WHL). After his first WHL season, he was selected fourth overall by the Columbus Blue Jackets in the 2010 NHL entry draft. He would play five seasons with them before being traded to the Nashville Predators for Seth Jones in January 2016. Playing parts of eight seasons with Nashville, he was a key part of seven straight postseason berths for the Predators, including a trip to the 2017 Stanley Cup Finals. Nearing the end of his contract as the Predators declined, he was traded to the Avalanche in the 2023 off-season.

Internationally, he has competed for the Canadian national junior team at the 2011 World Junior Championships, where he earned a silver medal and was named to the Tournament All-Star Team. In 2015, he participated in the 2015 NHL Skills Competition and was named the 2015 NHL All-Star Game MVP.

== Playing career ==
=== Amateur ===
Johansen was drafted into the Western Hockey League (WHL) 150th overall by the Portland Winterhawks in the 2007 WHL bantam draft. Having been offered an athletic scholarship to play with Northeastern University, he opted to play for the Penticton Vees of the British Columbia Hockey League (BCHL) in 2008–09 to protect his eligibility for the National Collegiate Athletic Association (NCAA). (Note: Playing major junior hockey in Canada makes one ineligible for college hockey in the United States.) He appeared in 42 games for the Vees as a 16-year-old, scoring 5 goals and 12 assists.

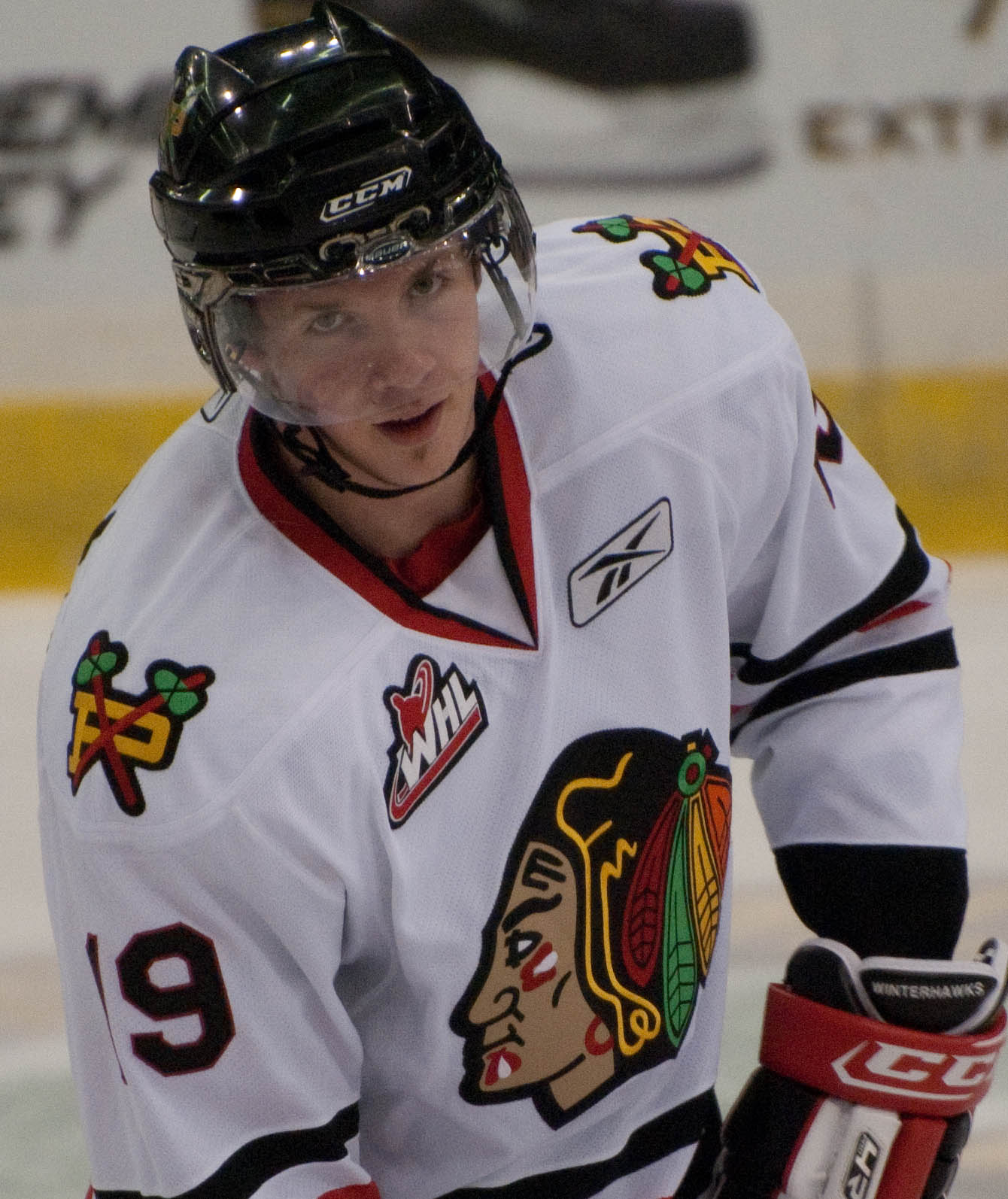
Johansen with the Winterhawks in November 2010

Convinced of his ability, the Winterhawks persuaded Johansen to forego university and join their club for the 2009–10 WHL season. In Portland, he joined a line with fellow 2010 NHL entry draft prospects Nino Niederreiter and Brad Ross. He finished the year with 25 goals and 69 points in 71 games, second among league rookies behind Kevin Connauton and second in team scoring, behind Chris Francis. Helping the Winterhawks make the playoffs one year after finishing last in the WHL, they advanced to the second round. Johansen added 18 points in 13 games, ninth in league scoring and first among rookies, despite playing in only two of four playoff rounds.

Johansen rapidly climbed prospect charts for the 2010 NHL entry draft, starting the year as a potential second round selection, before rising to 16th among North American skaters when the NHL Central Scouting Bureau (CSB) released its mid-season ranking. Johansen's coach with Penticton noted that, as one of the younger players of his draft class, his skill was often overlooked. NHL scouts praised his speed, playmaking ability and vision on the ice but believed he needed to show more consistency and physicality. He had been compared to Ottawa Senators centre Jason Spezza, while Johansen had said he tried to model his game after San Jose Sharks centre Joe Thornton. He finished the season as the tenth ranked skater according to Central Scouting and was projected to be a top 20 pick, perhaps as high as top 10. With the fourth overall pick in the 2010 NHL entry draft, Johansen was chosen by the Columbus Blue Jackets.

A couple of months after his draft, Johansen signed with Columbus to a three-year, entry-level contract on September 9, 2010. With a base salary of $900,000, the deal could have reached $1.975 million per year if he achieved all his bonus incentives. Attending his first NHL training camp that month, he did not make the Blue Jackets roster and was returned to Portland on October 2 for another year of junior hockey. Back in the WHL, Johansen was chosen to represent the league at the 2010 Subway Super Series, a six-game exhibition tournament featuring all-stars from the Canadian Hockey League (CHL) against Russian junior players. He completed the 2010–11 season improving to 92 points (40 goals and 52 assists) in 63 games, ranking seventh among league scorers.

=== Professional ===
==== Columbus Blue Jackets (2011–2016) ====
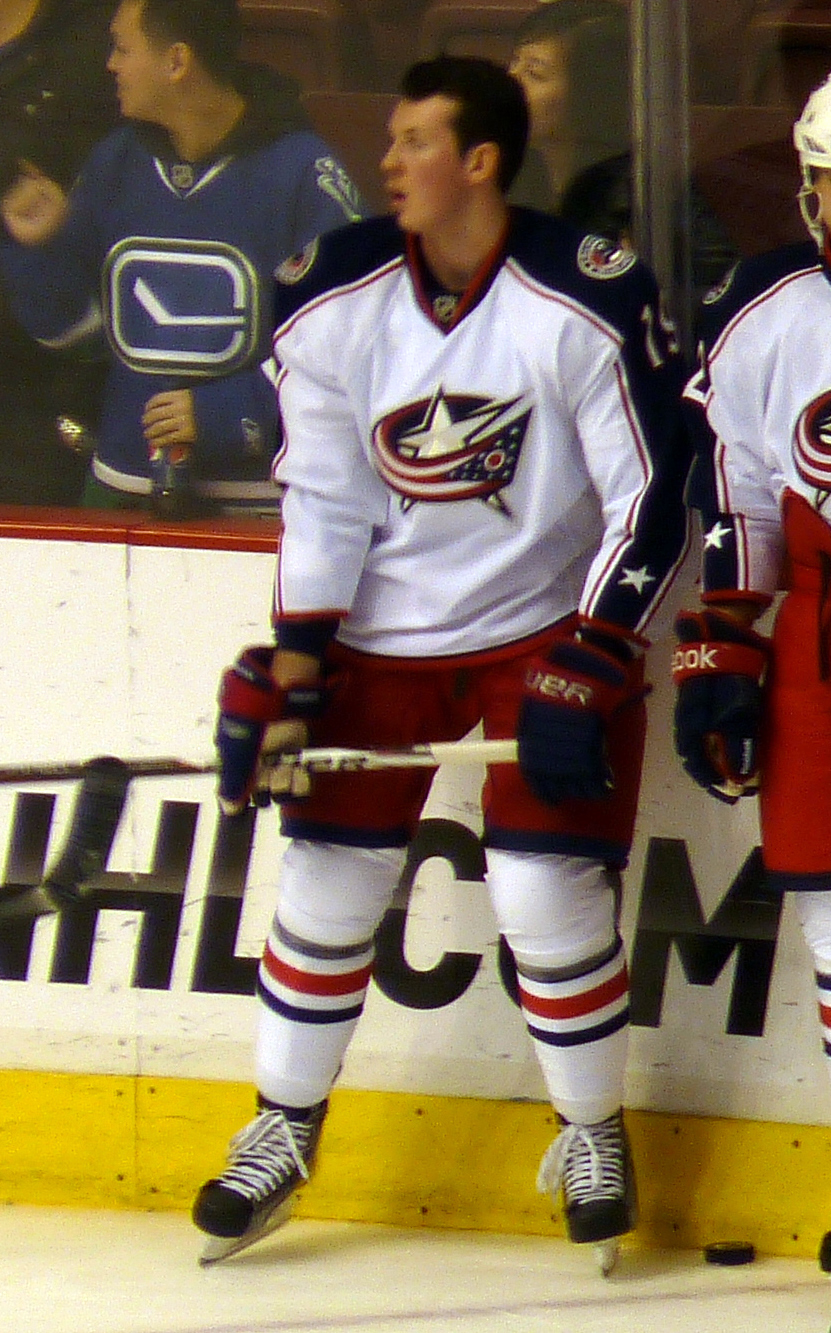
Johansen with the Blue Jackets in November 2011

Prior to the start of the 2011–12 season, Johansen participated in the Blue Jackets training camp and their annual NHL Prospects Tournament. Following training camp, Johansen made the Blue Jackets opening line-up and subsequently made his NHL debut on October 7, 2011. He registered 8 minutes and 46 seconds of ice time in his debut as the Blue Jackets fell 3–2 to the Nashville Predators. Johansen later registered his first NHL point, an assist on a Kris Russell goal, in a 4–3 loss to the Ottawa Senators on October 22. Three days later, Johansen and fellow rookie John Moore both scored their first career NHL goals against the Detroit Red Wings to lead the team to their first win of the season. This marked the first time in franchise history that two players scored their first NHL goals in the same game. As he continued to be a mainstay in the Blue Jackets lineup, Johansen became the third player in NHL history to tally two game-winning goals as his first in the NHL. After playing in his ninth game of the season, having recorded two goals and two assists in that span, Johansen was notified by Blue Jackets head coach Scott Arniel that he would remain with the team and not be returned to junior. (Note: A junior-eligible player's NHL contract does not take into effect until he plays at least 10 NHL games in one season.) By November 14, Johansen was tied with Vinny Prospal for the team's goal-scoring lead with five. Johansen also became the first player since Brian Propp to score his club's first three game-winners of the season. Although he would experience bouts of pointlessness, Johansen was often placed on the top line with Rick Nash and Jeff Carter. By mid-January, Johansen had accumulated seven goals and eight assists for 15 points through 36 games and was tied for the NHL lead among rookies with three game-winning goals. As a result, he was one of 12 rookies selected to participate at the 2012 NHL All-Star Skills Competition.

Due to the NHL's decision to lock out the players at the start of the 2012–13 season until a new collective bargaining agreement could be reached, Johansen was reassigned to the Blue Jackets' American Hockey League (AHL) affiliate, the Springfield Falcons. He made an immediate impact on their top line by tallying six points in seven games to lead them to a 5–1–1 record for the first time in franchise history. Through December, Johansen steadily led the team with 18 points through 22 games while playing an average of 20 minutes per night on their top line. On February 24, 2013, Johansen was re-called by the Blue Jackets for the remainder of the season after an agreement was reached. At the time, he had accumulated 13 goals and 13 assists through 33 games. However, after only collecting two assists and two penalty minutes in 10 games with the Blue Jackets, Johansen was re-assigned to the Falcons on February 6. He was recalled back to the NHL on February 24 and immediately centered a line with Matt Calvert and Nick Foligno. On April 12, Johansen played in his 100th career NHL game against the St. Louis Blues and scored a goal for the second consecutive game. By the end of the month, Johansen had tallied five goals and seven assists for 12 points with 12 penalty minutes through 40 games. Shortly after the Blue Jackets were eliminated from playoff contention, he was re-assigned to the Falcons on April 28 to help them with their 2013 Calder Cup Championship run.

After being benched by the Falcons coaching staff during the 2012 Calder Cup Championships, Johansen described himself as hitting "rock bottom." He subsequently spent the off-season gaining muscle and he returned to the Blue Jackets training camp weighing 222 pounds. Although the Blue Jackets struggled to win games at the start of the 2013–14 season, Johansen began to develop chemistry with new linemates Brandon Dubinsky and Cam Atkinson on the top line. Alongside his new linemates, Johansen tallied 13 points through 20 games and recorded 54 shots on net to rank second on the team behind Atkinson. By the end of November, Johansen led the team with 10 goals and 9 assists for 19 points as they finished the month maintaining a 10–3–2 record. Johansen continued to remain a consistent offensive threat even after being reunited with his original line of R. J. Umberger and Foligno. By December 5, he had registered 20 points in 28 games to put him on pace for a 60-point season. This trend continued throughout the month and by December 18, he led the team with 27 points through 34 games while also maintaining a nine-game point streak. He also improved his face-off win percentage to 52.85 while also taking the most face-offs for the team with 306. By early February, Johansen led the Blue Jackets in goals and points while tied for 14th in the NHL with 23 goals. On April 8, Johansen scored the game-winning goal at 3:33 of overtime to lead the Blue Jackets to their 41st win of the season and tie a franchise record. After scoring another game-winning goal a few days later, he helped the Blue Jackets clinch the first wild-card spot to face the Pittsburgh Penguins in the first round of the 2014 Stanley Cup playoffs. Johansen finished the regular season playing in all 82 games and leading the Blue Jackets with 33 goals and 30 assists for 63 points. His efforts were subsequently recognised with the NHL's Third Star of the Week.

During the 2014 off-season, Johansen and the Columbus Blue Jackets engaged in lengthy contract negotiations which Blue Jackets president of hockey operations John Davidson called "absurd" and "extortion." He later revealed that the team had offered Johansen numerous contract offers including $6 million, $32 million, and $46 million. Johansen eventually agreed on a three-year contract worth $3 million the first two years and $6 million in the last on October 6 after he had already missed the majority of training camp. Despite the holdout, Johansen made an immediate impact on the Blue Jackets lineup by quickly tallying six goals and 14 assists for 20 points through 17 games.

==== Nashville Predators (2016–2023) ====
On January 6, 2016, Johansen was traded by the Blue Jackets to the Nashville Predators in exchange for Seth Jones. He made an immediate impact on the lineup upon joining the team by tallying three goals and five assists through his first seven games with the team. Although he became a mainstay playing alongside James Neal on the Predators top line, the two failed to find a stable left-winger to play alongside them. As the two eventually found a stable partner in Calle Jarnkrok, Johansen added 18 points in his first 26 games with the Predators. From January 16 to March 23, the team maintained a 17–6–6 record while Johansen and Neal had combined for 10 goals and 20 points through the month of March. Although the Predators then suffered a losing streak from March 26 to April 2, the team qualified for the 2016 Stanley Cup playoffs when the Colorado Avalanche lost to the Washington Capitals. At the time, Johansen had tied for second with 13 points while Neal led the team with 17 points over 15 games. He subsequently finished the regular season with 34 points in 42 games with Nashville. Upon qualifying for the playoffs, Johansen and the Predators met with the Anaheim Ducks in the first round. The trio of Johansen – Neal – Jarnkrok maintained their strong offensive abilities by collaborating for the first goal just 35 seconds into Game 1. However, during Game 6, head coach Peter Laviolette moved Filip Forsberg up on the top line with Johansen and James Neal. The trio immediately developed chemistry together and combined for the game-winning goal to force Game 7. After the team won their franchise's first Game 7, they advanced to the second round against the San Jose Sharks. Johansen, Neal, and Forsberg all finished the Anaheim series ranked third on the team with three points. By Game 3 against the Sharks, Johansen had maintained a three-game point streak to rank fifth among all centres in the playoffs.

Unlike the previous season, Johansen began the 2016–17 season playing alongside Kevin Fiala and Filip Forsberg. However, the line would soon evolve to include Forsberg, Johansen and Viktor Arvidsson as the Predators main top line as the month continued. On this line, he tallied four assists over eight games before scoring his first goal of the season in the Predator's 5–1 win over the Colorado Avalanche on November 1. Following this goal, he quickly tallied three goals and two assists over two games after only tallying five points in his previous 14 games. By December 2, Johansen had tied with Forsberg for the team's scoring lead with 16 points, including tallying seven points over his previous four games. At the end of the month, Johansen led the team with 17 assists and 24 points while linemate Arvidsson ranked second with 9 goals and 14 assists. Johansen played in his 400th career NHL game on January 26, 2017, as the Predators beat the Columbus Blue Jackets 4–3. Following his milestone game, Johansen quickly accumulated two goals and six assists over seven games to continue leading the Predators with 38 points. By early March, Johansen and Forsberg tied for the team scoring lead with 49 points while Johansen led the team with 39 assists. On March 27, Johansen tallied his 100th career goal into an empty net for a 3–1 win over the New York Islanders. He finished the regular season with 47 assists and 61 points while leading the team with 54.6 percent of faceoff wins. His line with Forsberg and Arvidsson combined for 76 goals, 180 points, and controlled 58.9 percent of total shot attempts.

As the Predators faced off against the Chicago Blackhawks in the 2017 Stanley Cup playoffs, Johansen continued his dominant performance by tallying at least one point in all four games of the first round sweep. In their second round matchup against the St. Louis Blues, Johansen scored the series-winning goal in Game 6 to help the Predators advance to the Western Conference Finals. However, his success was soon cut short as he suffered a thigh injury during their Game 4 loss to the Anaheim Ducks. Johansen immediately underwent emergency surgery for an acute compartment syndrome in his left thigh and was ruled out for the remainder of the playoffs. At the time of the injury, he was tied for the team lead with 13 points through 14 playoff games. Despite his absence, the Predators reached the Stanley Cup Finals against the Pittsburgh Penguins, falling in six games to the defending champions. Following the loss, Johansen signed an eight-year, $64 million contract worth $8 million annually through the 2024–25 season, the biggest signing in Predators' history.

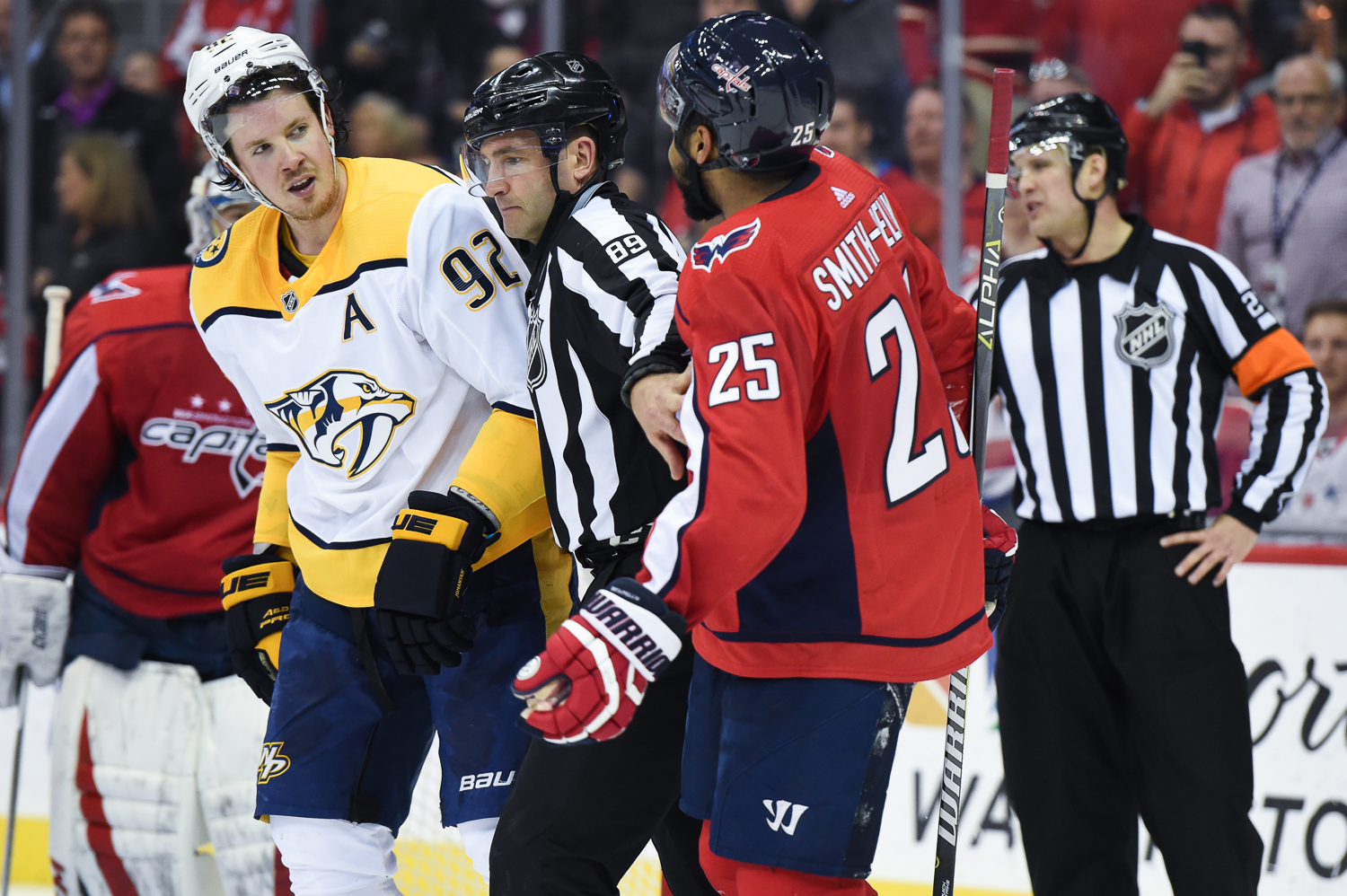
Johnasen (left) and Devante Smith-Pelly during a game against the Washington Capitals in April 2018

Johansen recovered during the off-season and returned for the Predator's training camp ahead of the 2017–18 season. As Roman Josi was named team captain, Johansen was named an alternate captain alongside Forsberg and Mattias Ekholm. As the Predators struggled to produce goals through October, head coach Peter Laviolette moved Scott Hartnell to the top line with Johansen and Arvidsson in early November to generate more offensive opportunities. This was shortlived however and Johansen was again reunited with Forsberg and Arvidsson on the Predators top line. After going goalless throughout October, Johansen scored his first goal of the season on November 17 to break Devan Dubnyk's franchise shutout record. Although he would miss three games with an upper-body injury in early December, Johansen continued to produce offensively for the Predators and tallied two assists in his return on December 13. Although Johansen would suffer a minor mid-game injury in January, he remained the sole original player on the top line as the Predators lost both Forsberg and Arvidsson to injuries. Once the two wingers returned, the line continued to dominate on the ice and helped the Predators maintain a 15-game point streak through late February and early March. On April 5, Johansen and the Predators won their first Central Division title in franchise history to clinch a spot in the 2018 Stanley Cup playoffs. He finished the regular season fourth on the team with 15 goals and 39 assists for 54 points through 79 games. Johansen's top line helped the Predators beat the Colorado Avalanche and helped them force a Game 7 against the Winnipeg Jets. In Game 6 against the Jets, Johansen tallied his 12th and 13th points of the playoffs to tie his career high in points during a post-single season. Although the Predators were eliminated from the playoffs in Game 7 of the second round, Johansen's line with Forsberg and Arvidsson combined for 18 goals over the playoffs.

When Johansen was reunited with Forsberg and Arvidsson to start the 2018–19 season, he immediately started the season by tallying multiple assists in five out of the first six games. The trio combined for 28 points through the first nine games of the season as the Predators maintained a 7–2–0 record and a five game point streak. By November 7, Johansen led the team in scoring with 15 points followed closely behind by Forsberg and Arvidsson with 14 and 12 respectively. However, despite their early success, the line began to fragment as Johansen went on a seven-game goalless streak while Arvidsson suffered a lower body injury. While Arvidsson recovered, head coach Peter Laviolette alternated between Colton Sissons, Kevin Fiala, and Craig Smith on the Predators' top line with Johansen and Forsberg. In spite of his alternating linemates, Johansen continued to lead the team in scoring with 17 assists and 21 points while also winning 55.4 percent of his face-offs. By the end of the month, Johansen and Forsberg were the only Predators skaters to have accumulated over 20 points, although Forsberg would soon miss numerous games due to an upper-body injury. While both of his linemates were out of the lineup, Johansen gained Ryan Hartman and Kevin Fiala as his new regular linemates. In the first seven games following Forsberg's injuries, he quickly accumulated one goal and four assists for five points. Once Forsberg returned to the lineup, the trio immediately re-established their chemistry and combined for three of the teams' four goals during their 4–3 win over the Blackhawks on January 9. Following his linemates return, Johansen maintained a six-game point streak that was snapped in a loss to the Winnipeg Jets on January 17. In the same game, Johansen served a minor penalty for high-sticking Jets forward Mark Scheifele, was subsequently suspended for two games, and forfeited $86,021.50 to the Players' Emergency Assistance Fund. Despite missing two games, Johansen still returned to the Predators lineup as their leading scorer with eight goals and 34 assists for 42 points. On March 16, Johansen tallied his 400th career NHL point with an assist on Forsberg's goal in a loss to the San Jose Sharks. Later that month, he tallied his 50th assist of the season to become the second player in franchise history to reach this milestone. Johansen finished the regular season with 14 goals and 50 assists to lead the team with 64 points as they qualified for the 2019 Stanley Cup playoffs. Johansen entered the first round against the Dallas Stars with a six-game scoring streak of three goals and six assists from the previous playoffs. Although Johansen remained with his usual linemates, they failed to reproduce their previous playoff production and finished the postseason with a combined four points through six games.

Following one of his best offensive seasons, Johansen experienced a dip in production in part due to various changes to the Predator's lineup and the shortened season as a result of COVID-19. Unlike the previous seasons, Johansen spent the majority of the shortened 2019–20 season with Jarnkrok and Arvidsson as his wingers instead of Forsberg. In early December, Johansen was fined $5,000 for elbowing Tampa Bay Lightning forward Brayden Point during their 3–2 overtime loss. As the Predators struggled to win games and maintained a 19-15-7 record heading into January, head coach Laviolette was replaced with John Hynes. Despite the new head coach, Johansen and the Predators continued to struggle to score goals. By late January, Johansen had 10 goals and 27 points while his line averaged 0.93 expected goals per 20 minutes at five-on-five. When the NHL paused play due to the COVID-19 pandemic, Johansen was on pace for 43 points with 14 goals and 22 assists through 68 games. He later expressed his disappointment in his play, stating: "I'll be honest, it has chewed me up this year. This is an experience I haven't had since I was a young player, and it ate me up. You've got teammates counting on you, you've got this big contract, and you're just trying to find it." While the league paused play, Johansen and teammates Josi, Matt Duchene, and Pekka Rinne established a fund at two Dunkin' Donuts locations in Nashville to serve hospital workers. Once the NHL resumed for the 2020 Stanley Cup playoffs, Johansen was reunited with Forsberg and Arvidsson for the Qualifiers against the Dallas Stars.

Johansen began the shortened 2020–21 season with four assists in 10 games before being sidelined with an upper body injury. He subsequently missed seven games to recover before returning to the lineup for their game against the Detroit Red Wings on February 23. However, his season continued to be derailed as he only played four more games before being added to the Predators' COVID-19 list. His time on the protocol was shortlived and he was removed on March 4. Throughout the remainder of the season, Johansen occasionally gained Eeli Tolvanen as his winger in place of Arvidsson.

On April 6, 2022, Johansen recorded his first career NHL hat-trick to help the Predators maintain their lead for the Western Conference's first Wild Card spot. Despite playing with struggling line mates, Johansen finished the regular season with 26 goals and 37 assists for 63 points.

During the 2022–23 season, Johansen was reunited with former Portland Winter Hawks teammate Nino Niederreiter. By late November, the duo had combined for 14 goals in 18 games. The two were joined by Tolvanen for six games before he was removed from the top line. On November 11, 2022, Johansen played in his 800th career NHL game against the Colorado Avalanche. In February 2023, during a game against the Vancouver Canucks, Johansen was inadvertently cut by the skate of Quinn Hughes and underwent surgery on his lower right leg. At the time of the injury, he ranked fifth on the Predators with 28 points through 55 games. Johansen was expected to need 12 weeks to recover and thus miss the remainder of the regular season.

==== Colorado Avalanche, Philadelphia Flyers, and retirement (2023–2026) ====
Following the 2022–23 season and seven and a half seasons within the Predators organization, Johansen was traded at 50% retention for the remaining two years of his contract to the Colorado Avalanche in exchange for the rights to Alex Galchenyuk on June 24, 2023. On March 6, 2024, Johansen was traded to the Philadelphia Flyers, and placed on waivers. He cleared waivers the next day and was assigned to Philadelphia's AHL affiliate, the Lehigh Valley Phantoms. However, due to an existing injury that was discovered during the trade and NHL rules regarding the assignment of injured NHL players to a team's AHL team roster, he was required to remain on the NHL roster.

On August 20, 2024, Johansen was placed on unconditional waivers by Philadelphia following material breach of contract. However, the National Hockey League Players' Association filed a grievance on Johansen's behalf on September 26, disputing the alleged breach of contract. Following a hearing in February 2025, an independent arbitrator ruled in favor of Philadelphia on August 12, allowing Johansen's contract to be terminated.

On March 19, 2026, Johansen officially announced his retirement from hockey.

== International play ==
Medal record

Men's ice hockey

Representing Canada

World Junior Championships
Silver medal – second place	2011 United States	

Johansen was invited to take part in the Canadian national junior team's selection camp in August and December 2011. He was later named to the squad, competing in the 2011 World Junior Championships, held in Buffalo, New York. Making his international debut against Russia, he scored his first goal for Canada in a 5–3 win. In the quarterfinal against Switzerland, he was named the player of the game, having scored his second goal of the tournament. He scored again in the semifinal against the United States to help Canada advance to the gold medal game, where they were defeated 5–3 by Russia. Johansen finished with three goals and nine points, third in team scoring behind Brayden Schenn and Ryan Ellis, and was named to the Tournament All-Star Team.

== Personal life ==
Johansen was born in Vancouver, British Columbia, to Randall and Rosalind Johansen. He has a younger brother, Lucas, who was drafted by the Washington Capitals in 2016 and currently plays for the Henderson Silver Knights in the AHL. Johansen played his first years of minor hockey with the Vancouver Thunderbirds organization until his family moved to the suburb of Port Moody. (Note: Triple-A competition represents the highest level of play within an age group, while double-A indicates the second-highest.) He played in Port Moody at the double-A level through to bantam (age 13–14 level), including a peewee (age 11–12) provincial championship. In 2007–08, he played with the Vancouver North East Chiefs of the British Columbia Major Midget League. (Note: "Midget" refers to the minor hockey level for age 15 to 17.)

Johansen is a Christian. After visiting a Christian conference for hockey players, he said, “I decided at the end of that conference that I wanted to get baptized and I wanted to spend the rest of my life following Jesus. … Him being in my heart, it's a special feeling.”

== Career statistics ==
=== Regular season and playoffs ===
			Regular season					Playoffs
Season	Team	League	GP	G	A	Pts	PIM	GP	G	A	Pts	PIM
2008–09	Penticton Vees	BCHL	47	5	12	17	21	10	4	3	7	2
2009–10	Portland Winterhawks	WHL	71	25	44	69	53	13	6	12	18	18
2010–11	Portland Winterhawks	WHL	63	40	52	92	64	20	13	15	28	6
2011–12	Columbus Blue Jackets	NHL	67	9	12	21	24	—	—	—	—	—
2012–13	Springfield Falcons	AHL	40	17	16	33	20	5	0	1	1	2
2012–13	Columbus Blue Jackets	NHL	40	5	7	12	12	—	—	—	—	—
2013–14	Columbus Blue Jackets	NHL	82	33	30	63	43	6	2	4	6	4
2014–15	Columbus Blue Jackets	NHL	82	26	45	71	40	—	—	—	—	—
2015–16	Columbus Blue Jackets	NHL	38	6	20	26	25	—	—	—	—	—
2015–16	Nashville Predators	NHL	42	8	26	34	36	14	4	4	8	16
2016–17	Nashville Predators	NHL	82	14	47	61	60	14	3	10	13	12
2017–18	Nashville Predators	NHL	79	15	39	54	78	13	5	9	14	2
2018–19	Nashville Predators	NHL	80	14	50	64	42	6	1	1	2	2
2019–20	Nashville Predators	NHL	68	14	22	36	45	4	1	4	5	2
2020–21	Nashville Predators	NHL	48	7	15	22	22	6	3	1	4	14
2021–22	Nashville Predators	NHL	79	26	37	63	53	4	0	2	2	2
2022–23	Nashville Predators	NHL	55	12	16	28	32	—	—	—	—	—
2023–24	Colorado Avalanche	NHL	63	13	10	23	34	—	—	—	—	—
NHL totals			905	202	376	578	546	67	19	35	54	54

=== International ===
Year	Team	Event	Result	GP	G	A	Pts	PIM
2011	Canada	WJC	2nd place, silver medalist(s)	7	3	6	9	2
Junior totals				7	3	6	9	2

== Awards and honours ==
Award	Year	Ref
WHL
CHL Top Prospects Game	2010	
West First All-Star Team	2011	
NHL
NHL All-Star Game	2015	
NHL All-Star Game MVP	2015	
International
World Junior All-Star Team	2011	

== Notes ==
Awards and achievements
Preceded by John Moore	Columbus Blue Jackets first-round draft pick 2010	Succeeded by Ryan Murray
