= Nick Foligno =

American ice hockey player (born 1987)

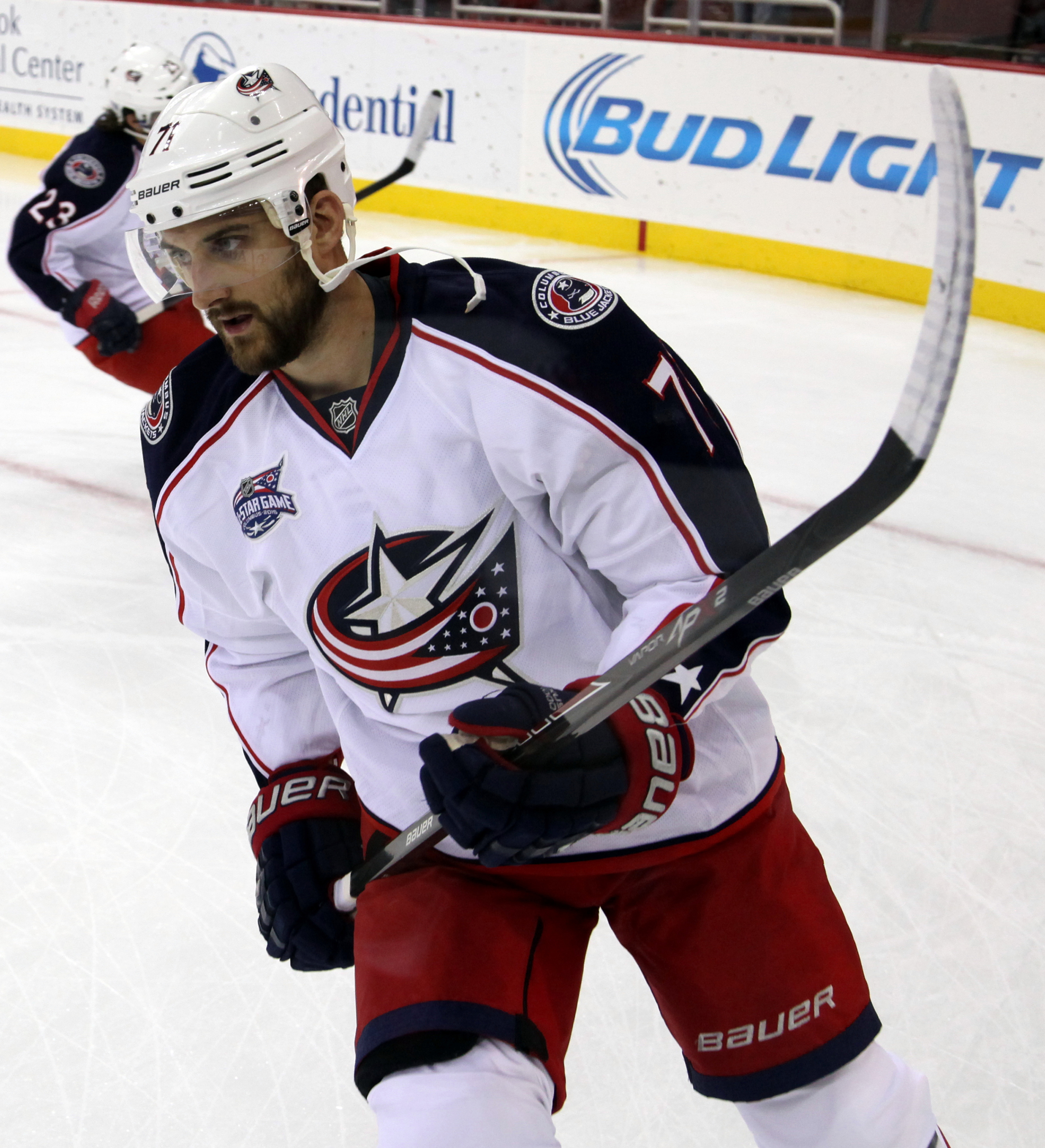
- Foligno with the Columbus Blue Jackets in 2014
- Born: October 31, 1987 (age 39) Buffalo, New York, U.S.
- Height: 6 ft 0 in (183 cm)
- Weight: 210 lb (95 kg; 15 st 0 lb)
- Position: Left wing
- Shoots: Left
- NHL team Former teams: Minnesota Wild; Ottawa Senators; Columbus Blue Jackets; Toronto Maple Leafs; Boston Bruins; Chicago Blackhawks
- National team: United States
- NHL draft: 28th overall, 2006; Ottawa Senators
- Playing career: 2007–present

Nicholas Foligno (/fəˈliːnoʊ/; born October 31, 1987) is an American professional hockey player who is a left winger for the Minnesota Wild of the National Hockey League (NHL). He was selected in the first round, 28th overall by the Ottawa Senators during the 2006 NHL entry draft. Foligno was traded to the Columbus Blue Jackets six years later.

His father, Mike Foligno, is a veteran of over 1,000 career NHL games, while his brother, Marcus Foligno, is his teammate on the Wild.

== Playing career ==
=== Amateur ===
As a youth, Foligno played in the 2000 and 2001 Quebec International Pee-Wee Hockey Tournaments with a minor ice hockey team from Hershey, Pennsylvania.

Foligno began the 2003–04 season with the USA Hockey National Team Development Program's under-17 team, where he had seven goals and 16 points. He moved up to the under-18 team, which at the time played in the North American Hockey League (NAHL), where in 43 games, Foligno scored eight goals and 20 points. In seven playoff games, Foligno had two goals and three points.

Foligno appeared in four games with the under-18 team in 2004–05, getting two goals and an assist.

After his tenure with the Development Program, Foligno joined the Sudbury Wolves of the Ontario Hockey League (OHL), who were coached by his father, Mike Foligno. In his rookie season in 2004–05, Foligno had ten goals and 38 points in 65 games. He played his first game with the Wolves on September 24, 2004, earning no points in a 3–1 win over the Ottawa 67's. Foligno registered his first OHL point, an assist, in a 6–1 win over the Erie Otters on September 26, 2004. It took Foligno 23 games, but he scored his first career OHL goal on November 20, 2004, beating Kitchener Rangers goaltender Dan Turple in a 6–3 loss. In the playoffs, Foligno had five goals and ten points in 12 games, as Sudbury lost to the Ottawa 67's in the second round of the playoffs.

Foligno saw his offensive production increase during his second season with the Wolves in 2005–06, as he led the club with 70 points, scoring 24 goals and 46 assists, while registering 146 penalty minutes, helping the Wolves to the post-season. In ten playoff games, Foligno had a goal and four points as Sudbury was swept by the Peterborough Petes in the second round.

Foligno returned to the Wolves for a third season in 2006–07, as he scored a team high 31 goals and 88 points in 66 games, helping Sudbury clinch a playoff berth. In the post-season, he scored 12 goals and 29 points in 21 games to finish with the second highest point total in the League; Sudbury, however, lost to the Plymouth Whalers in six games in the J. Ross Robertson Cup finals.

=== Ottawa Senators ===
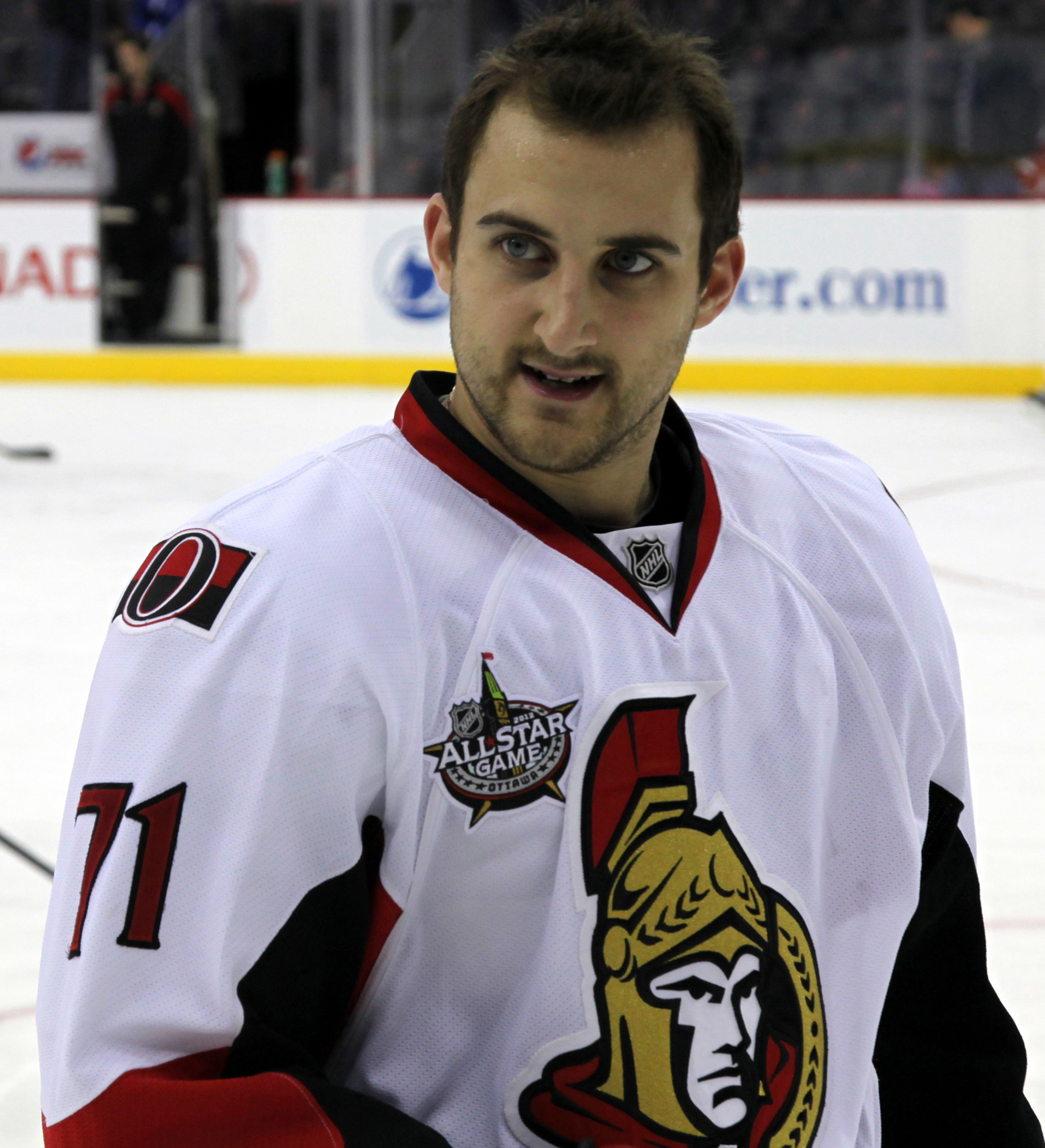
Foligno with the Senators in December 2011.

The Ottawa Senators selected Foligno with the 28th overall pick in the 2006 NHL entry draft. On March 21, 2007, Senators General Manager John Muckler announced that the team and Foligno agreed to a three-year, entry-level contract. He spent some time with the Binghamton Senators of the American Hockey League (AHL) during the 2007–08 season, appearing in 28 games, scoring six goals and 19 points. He earned his first AHL point in his first game on November 16, 2007, an assist in a 6–3 loss to the Philadelphia Phantoms. Foligno scored his first AHL goal on January 18, 2008, scoring on Adam Munro of the Syracuse Crunch in a 6–3 win.

Foligno spent most of the 2007–08 with the Ottawa Senators. He began the season with Ottawa and played in his first game on October 3, 2007, earning no points in 7:36 ice time in a 4–3 victory over the Toronto Maple Leafs. Foligno scored his first career NHL goal and point on October 18, 2007, as he beat Carey Price of the Montreal Canadiens in a 4–3 Senators win. When he scored the goal, he performed his father Mike Foligno's noted goal celebration, the "Foligno Leap". Foligno finished the season appearing in 45 games with Ottawa, scoring six goals and nine points. He appeared in his first Stanley Cup playoff game on April 9, 2008, in a 4–0 loss to the Pittsburgh Penguins. On April 14, 2008, he scored his first career playoff goal, beating the Penguins' Marc-André Fleury in a 4–1 Senators loss. The Senators were ultimately swept in four-straight games in the Eastern Conference quarterfinals; Foligno's goal was his only registered point of the series.

Foligno spent the entire 2008–09 season in the NHL with the Senators, scoring 17 goals and 32 points in 81 games. The Senators, however, struggled throughout the season and failed to make the 2009 playoffs.

In the 2009–10 season, Foligno missed 21 games due to injuries, including a broken leg suffered from blocking a shot in a game against the Canadiens on January 30, 2010. He scored nine goals and 26 points in 61 games he appeared in. The Senators qualified for the 2010 playoffs, and in six games, Foligno had one assist as Ottawa again fell to the Pittsburgh Penguins in the Eastern Conference quarterfinals.

Foligno appeared in all 82 games in the 2010–11 season for Ottawa, scoring 14 goals and 34 points. The team, however, failed to make the playoffs for the second time in three seasons. Foligno put up his best offensive numbers during the subsequent 2011–12 season, registering 15 goals and 47 points while again playing in all of Ottawa's 82 regular season games.

=== Columbus Blue Jackets ===
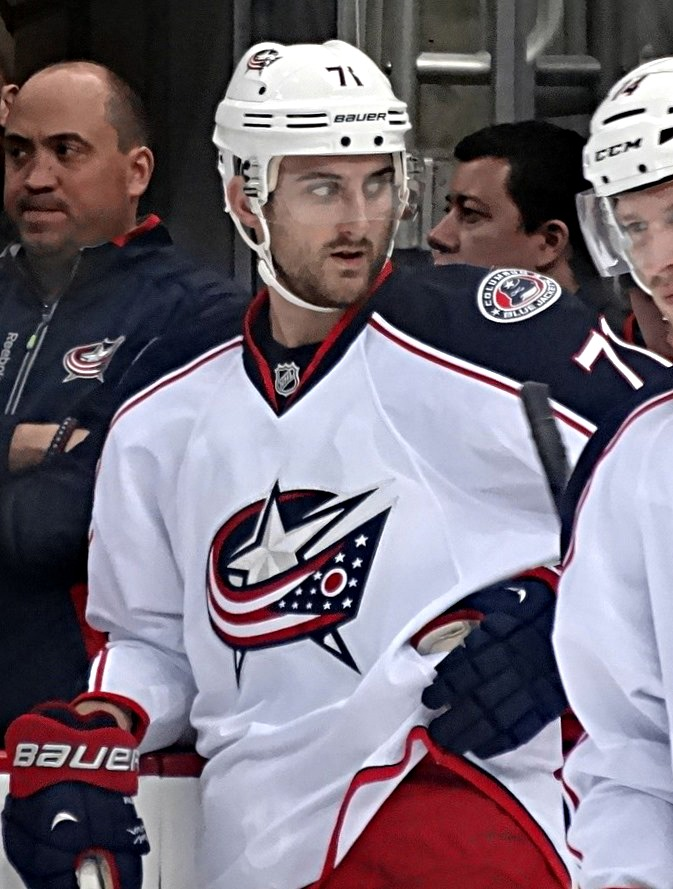
Foligno with the Blue Jackets, November 2013.

On July 1, 2012, Foligno was traded to the Columbus Blue Jackets in exchange for defenseman Marc Methot. Having lost two of their starting six defensemen via free agency, Ottawa desperately needed to acquire a defenseman and Methot fit the bill for the Sens. Foligno had earlier been offered to Columbus as part of a package for superstar Rick Nash; however, Blue Jackets General Manager Scott Howson informed the Senators that Nash was unwilling to accept a trade to Ottawa. Five days after acquiring him, Columbus signed Foligno to a three-year contract worth a reported $9.15 million; Foligno had been a restricted free agent.

Foligno scored a notable goal in game 4 of the Eastern Conference quarterfinals in the 2014 playoffs against the Pittsburgh Penguins – Blue Jackets forward R. J. Umberger blocked a slapshot with his head, whereupon Foligno picked up the puck, skated down the ice and shot a knuckle-puck past goaltender Marc-André Fleury for the come-from-behind overtime winner.

In 2015, Foligno was selected by the NHL general managers to represent Columbus, in addition to Blue Jackets teammates Ryan Johansen and Sergei Bobrovsky, at the 2015 NHL All-Star Game, held in Columbus, Ohio. Foligno was additionally named a captain for one of the teams during the game, Team Foligno. His team lost to Team Toews 17–12.

On April 4, 2015, Foligno scored his first career NHL hat-trick against the Pittsburgh Penguins. On May 20, shortly after the end of the 2014–15 season, Foligno was named captain of the Blue Jackets, filling a vacancy existent since previous team captain Rick Nash's departure to the New York Rangers in the 2012 off-season. Foligno became the sixth captain in Blue Jackets' history. The captaincy came after Foligno posted career-highs in goals (31) and points (73) from 79 regular season games played, ranking tenth in the League in the latter statistic, points.

On February 25, 2016, in a game against the New Jersey Devils, Foligno recorded 4 points, including his second career hat trick, and leading the Blue Jackets to a 6–1 victory.

On November 9, 2019, Foligno was assessed a major penalty and game misconduct for elbowing Colorado Avalanche forward Pierre-Édouard Bellemare. He was suspended three games for the incident.

On February 7, 2021, in a regular season game against the Carolina Hurricanes, Foligno scored his 200th career goal.

=== Toronto Maple Leafs ===
On April 11, 2021, one day before the NHL trade deadline and in the final year of his contract with a Blue Jackets team expected to miss the postseason, Foligno was involved in a three-team trade to eventually end up with the Toronto Maple Leafs. To make the trade work, he was initially dealt to the San Jose Sharks in exchange for forward Stefan Noesen, with Columbus retaining 50% of his salary. Shortly after, Foligno was dealt to Toronto in exchange for a 2021 fourth-round pick, where San Jose retained 50% of Foligno's remaining salary (or 25% of his overall cap hit). Afterwards, Noesen was traded to the Maple Leafs, with Columbus receiving a first-round pick in 2021 and a 2022 fourth-round pick, as the compensation for Foligno.

Foligno's short tenure in Toronto was marred with injury. He missed several games between the trade and end of the regular season with injury, although picked up four assists in seven appearances. Again limited by injury, Foligno appeared in four of the team's seven playoff games, collecting one assist and having relatively little on-ice impact, although was involved in a notable fight with Corey Perry after Perry concussed captain John Tavares.

=== Boston Bruins ===
Although there was mutual interest between Foligno and the Maple Leafs in signing a new contract, on July 28, 2021, Foligno signed as a free agent to a two-year, $7.6 million contract with the Boston Bruins. On April 2, 2022, Nick played in his 1,000th NHL game, a Bruins 5-2 home victory over his former team Columbus. Foligno had a disappointing first season with the Bruins, and as a result, was placed on waivers by the Bruins on October 9, 2022, but was brought back to the team for the 2022-23 season after going unclaimed.

After a disappointing first season with the Bruins, Foligno saw somewhat of a resurgence in his second year with the team. He was seen as a leader on a historic Bruins team that beat the single-season NHL record for both wins and total points. By the end of the season, he doubled his point totals from the previous season, and was nicknamed "Uncle Nick" by Jakub Lauko, referring to the leadership role he had with the team. However, Foligno and the Bruins' season ended in disappointment after being eliminated by the Florida Panthers in seven games in the first round of the 2023 playoffs, a series in which Foligno was scratched for the decisive game 7.

=== Chicago Blackhawks ===
On June 26, 2023, Foligno, a pending free agent from the Bruins, was traded to the Chicago Blackhawks along with Taylor Hall in exchange for Ian Mitchell and Alec Regula. The following day, Foligno agreed to a one-year, $4 million contract with the Blackhawks for the 2023–24 season.

Foligno once again took on a veteran presence on a young Blackhawks team. He formed a strong bond with Connor Bedard who was the first overall pick in the 2023 draft. On January 6, 2024, Foligno was placed on injured reserve (IR) with a fractured left finger, which he suffered during a fight with New Jersey Devils' defenseman Brendan Smith after Smith broke Bedard's jaw. In the midst of a successful season with the Blackhawks, and the team needing his presence, Foligno signed a two-year, $9 million extension with the team on January 12, 2024. On March 12, Foligno tied his career high for points in a game with four assists for four points in a 7–2 win against the Anaheim Ducks. It was also his career high for assists in a game.

On September 18, 2024, Foligno was named the 36th captain in Blackhawks history.

=== Minnesota Wild ===
On March 6, 2026, Foligno was traded to the Minnesota Wild just hours prior to the NHL trade deadline, giving him the opportunity to play with his brother, Marcus. Entering free agency, Foligno signed a one-year extension with Minnesota on July 2, 2026.

== International play ==
Foligno represented the United States in the 2009 World Championship. In nine games, he had two assists as the United States finished in fourth place, losing 4–2 to Sweden in the bronze medal game. Foligno then represented the United States in the 2010 World Championship, and in six games, he scored three goals as the team struggled in the tournament, finishing in 13th place.

== Personal life ==
Born in the United States to Canadian parents, Foligno has dual Canadian–American citizenship. At the time of his birth, his father, Mike, played for the Buffalo Sabres and the family resided in the Buffalo area. Although his brother Marcus has represented Canada internationally, Nick has chosen to represent the United States.

Foligno's younger brother, Marcus, who was drafted by the Sabres in the 2009 NHL entry draft, is a member of the Minnesota Wild. The two brothers also have two sisters, Lisa and Cara. In the summer of 2009, Foligno lost his mother, Janis, to breast cancer. He is an avid supporter of cancer patient care and research at Roger's House, the Children's Hospital of Eastern Ontario Foundation, the Ottawa Regional Cancer Foundation and the Ottawa Hospital Foundation. Foligno is also the "Celebrity Chair" of Cystic Fibrosis Canada's Ottawa Chapter, where he and his wife Janelle are very active participants.

Foligno and his wife, Janelle have three children. The family resides in Upper Arlington, Ohio. He also resides in Sudbury, Ontario, during the off-season, where his parents were born and raised. He is a devout Catholic and speaks openly about his faith. On October 11, 2016, Foligno and his wife donated $1 million to Nationwide Children's Hospital and Boston Children's Hospital, the same facilities that took care of their daughter's heart defects when she was a newborn.

Foligno has traditionally worn jersey number 71, an inversion of the number 17 his father wore for most of his NHL career (although Mike did wear 71 while playing for the Toronto Maple Leafs). However, as fellow Bruins left winger Taylor Hall had already been wearing number 71 as a Bruins player, Foligno chose to wear his number 17 as his father did as an NHL player.

== Career statistics ==
=== Regular season and playoffs ===
			Regular season					Playoffs
Season	Team	League	GP	G	A	Pts	PIM	GP	G	A	Pts	PIM
2002–03	Central Penn Panthers	MJHL	31	11	17	28	119	—	—	—	—	—
2002–03	Hershey High School	HSPA	13	18	23	41	—	—	—	—	—	—
2003–04	U.S. NTDP U17	USDP	18	7	9	16	28	—	—	—	—	—
2003–04	U.S. NTDP U18	NAHL	43	8	12	20	44	7	2	1	3	8
2004–05	U.S. NTDP U18	USDP	4	2	1	3	0	—	—	—	—	—
2004–05	Sudbury Wolves	OHL	65	10	28	38	111	12	5	5	10	16
2005–06	Sudbury Wolves	OHL	65	24	46	70	146	10	1	3	4	28
2006–07	Sudbury Wolves	OHL	66	31	57	88	135	10	8	7	15	80
2007–08	Binghamton Senators	AHL	28	6	13	19	16	—	—	—	—	—
2007–08	Ottawa Senators	NHL	45	6	3	9	16	4	1	0	1	2
2008–09	Ottawa Senators	NHL	81	17	15	32	49	—	—	—	—	—
2009–10	Ottawa Senators	NHL	61	9	17	26	53	6	0	1	1	2
2010–11	Ottawa Senators	NHL	82	14	20	34	43	—	—	—	—	—
2011–12	Ottawa Senators	NHL	82	15	32	47	124	7	1	3	4	8
2012–13	Columbus Blue Jackets	NHL	45	6	13	19	28	—	—	—	—	—
2013–14	Columbus Blue Jackets	NHL	70	18	21	39	96	4	2	0	2	4
2014–15	Columbus Blue Jackets	NHL	79	31	42	73	50	—	—	—	—	—
2015–16	Columbus Blue Jackets	NHL	72	12	25	37	53	—	—	—	—	—
2016–17	Columbus Blue Jackets	NHL	79	26	25	51	55	4	0	2	2	6
2017–18	Columbus Blue Jackets	NHL	72	15	18	33	50	6	2	1	3	4
2018–19	Columbus Blue Jackets	NHL	73	17	18	35	44	10	1	2	3	4
2019–20	Columbus Blue Jackets	NHL	67	10	21	31	62	10	2	4	6	10
2020–21	Columbus Blue Jackets	NHL	42	7	9	16	28	—	—	—	—	—
2020–21	Toronto Maple Leafs	NHL	7	0	4	4	4	4	0	1	1	5
2021–22	Boston Bruins	NHL	64	2	11	13	61	7	0	1	1	4
2022–23	Boston Bruins	NHL	60	10	16	26	75	6	1	2	3	18
2023–24	Chicago Blackhawks	NHL	74	17	20	37	57	—	—	—	—	—
2024–25	Chicago Blackhawks	NHL	78	15	20	35	48	—	—	—	—	—
2025–26	Chicago Blackhawks	NHL	37	3	8	11	27	—	—	—	—	—
2025–26	Minnesota Wild	NHL	17	1	3	4	17	11	2	1	3	6
NHL totals			1,287	251	361	612	1,024	79	12	18	30	73

=== International ===
Year	Team	Event	Result	GP	G	A	Pts	PIM
2004	United States	U17	4th	5	4	6	10	2
2009	United States	WC	4th	9	0	2	2	4
2010	United States	WC	13th	6	3	0	3	0
2016	United States	WC	4th	10	3	2	5	10
Junior totals				5	4	6	10	2
Senior totals				25	6	4	10	14

== Awards and honors ==
Award	Year
NHL
NHL All-Star Game	2015
King Clancy Memorial Trophy	2017
Mark Messier Leadership Award	2017

Awards and achievements
Preceded by Brian Lee	Ottawa Senators first-round draft pick 2006	Succeeded by Jim O'Brien
Sporting positions
Preceded by Rick Nash	Columbus Blue Jackets captain 2015–2021	Succeeded by Boone Jenner
Preceded by Jonathan Toews	Chicago Blackhawks captain 2024–2026	Succeeded by Connor Bedard
