= 2006–07 Columbus Blue Jackets season =

National Hockey League season

2006–07 Columbus Blue Jackets
- Division: 4th Central
- Conference: 11th Western
- 2006–07 record: 33–42–7
- Home record: 18–19–4
- Road record: 15–23–3
- Goals for: 201
- Goals against: 249

Team information
- General manager: Doug MacLean
- Coach: Gerard Gallant (Oct-Nov); Gary Agnew (Nov); Ken Hitchcock (Nov-Apr)
- Captain: Adam Foote
- Alternate captains: Sergei Fedorov; Rick Nash; David Vyborny
- Arena: Nationwide Arena
- Average attendance: 16,401 (90.43%)
- Minor league affiliates: Syracuse Crunch; Dayton Bombers; Youngstown SteelHounds

Team leaders
- Goals: Rick Nash (27)
- Assists: David Vyborny (48)
- Points: David Vyborny (64)
- Penalty minutes: Alexander Svitov (145)
- Plus/minus: Anders Eriksson (+12)
- Wins: Fredrik Norrena (24)
- Goals against average: Fredrik Norrena (2.78)

The 2006–07 Columbus Blue Jackets season was the seventh National Hockey League season in Columbus, Ohio. The Blue Jackets once again failed to qualify for the postseason for the sixth year in a row for the first time in franshise history. Since the Atlanta Thrashers qualified for the playoffs in the East, the Blue Jackets were, until the 2008–09 season, the only NHL team to have never played a post-season game.

== Off-season ==
The off-season was dominated by a contract dispute with top forward Nikolay Zherdev, who had threatened to return to Russia to play if Columbus did not meet his demands. Zherdev remained a holdout for much of the preseason. However, the two parties were able to come to an agreement approximately a week before the season began.

== Regular season ==
The Blue Jackets, hoping to qualify for the playoffs for the first time in franchise history, got off to a disastrous start, falling as low as 6–16–2 into December, briefly holding the worst record in the NHL. The Jackets' poor start led general manager Doug MacLean to fire head coach Gerard Gallant on November 13. Assistant coach Gary Agnew was named interim head coach the following day.

Gallant would be replaced a week later by veteran coach Ken Hitchcock. Coincidentally, Hitchcock's first game as Jackets head coach was against the Philadelphia Flyers, the team that fired him as head coach earlier in the season.

The Blue Jackets were shut out a league-high 16 times during the regular season. Along with the four shutouts Blue Jackets goaltenders recorded, 20 of the Blue Jackets' 82 regular-season games ended in a shutout. They were also the most penalized team in the League, with 453 power-play opportunities against.

=== Season standings ===
Central Division
| No. | CR | | GP | W | L | OTL | GF | GA | Pts |
|---|---|---|---|---|---|---|---|---|---|
| 1 | 1 | **Detroit Red Wings** | 82 | 50 | 19 | 13 | 254 | 199 | 113 |
| 2 | 4 | **Nashville Predators** | 82 | 51 | 23 | 8 | 272 | 212 | 110 |
| 3 | 10 | St. Louis Blues | 82 | 34 | 35 | 13 | 214 | 254 | 81 |
| 4 | 11 | Columbus Blue Jackets | 82 | 33 | 42 | 7 | 201 | 249 | 73 |
| 5 | 13 | Chicago Blackhawks | 82 | 31 | 42 | 9 | 201 | 258 | 71 |

Note: CR = Conference rank; GP = Games played; W = Wins; L = Losses; T = Ties; OTL = Overtime/shootout loss; GF = Goals for; GA = Goals against; PIM = Penalties in minutes; Pts = Points
Bolded teams qualified for the playoffs.

Western Conference
| R | | Div | GP | W | L | OTL | GF | GA | Pts |
|---|---|---|---|---|---|---|---|---|---|
| **1** | **z-Detroit Red Wings** | **CE** | **82** | **50** | **19** | **13** | **254** | **199** | **113** |
| **2** | **y-Anaheim Ducks** | **PA** | **82** | **48** | **20** | **14** | **258** | **208** | **110** |
| **3** | **y-Vancouver Canucks** | **NW** | **82** | **49** | **26** | **7** | **222** | **201** | **105** |
| **4** | **Nashville Predators** | **CE** | **82** | **51** | **23** | **8** | **272** | **212** | **110** |
| **5** | **San Jose Sharks** | **PA** | **82** | **51** | **26** | **5** | **258** | **199** | **107** |
| **6** | **Dallas Stars** | **PA** | **82** | **50** | **25** | **7** | **226** | **197** | **107** |
| **7** | **Minnesota Wild** | **NW** | **82** | **48** | **26** | **8** | **235** | **191** | **104** |
| **8** | **Calgary Flames** | **NW** | **82** | **43** | **29** | **10** | **258** | **226** | **96** |
8.5
| 9 | Colorado Avalanche | NW | 82 | 44 | 31 | 7 | 272 | 251 | 95 |
| 10 | St. Louis Blues | CE | 82 | 34 | 35 | 13 | 214 | 254 | 81 |
| 11 | Columbus Blue Jackets | CE | 82 | 33 | 42 | 7 | 201 | 249 | 73 |
| 12 | Edmonton Oilers | NW | 82 | 32 | 43 | 7 | 195 | 248 | 71 |
| 13 | Chicago Blackhawks | CE | 82 | 31 | 42 | 9 | 201 | 258 | 71 |
| 14 | Los Angeles Kings | PA | 82 | 27 | 41 | 14 | 227 | 283 | 68 |
| 15 | Phoenix Coyotes | PA | 82 | 31 | 46 | 5 | 216 | 284 | 67 |

bold - qualified for playoffs, y - division title, z - best conference record
CE - Central Division, NW - Northwest Division, PA - Pacific Division

== Schedule and results ==
2006–07 regular season
October: 3–5–1 (home: 2–2–1; road: 1–3–0)

| Game | Date | Visitor | Score | Home | OT | Decision | Attendance | Record | Points | Recap |
|---|---|---|---|---|---|---|---|---|---|---|
| 1 | October 6 | Vancouver | 3 – 2 | Columbus | OT | Leclaire | 18,136 | 0–0–1 | 1 | OTL |
| 2 | October 7 | Columbus | 5 – 4 | Chicago | | Leclaire | 17,133 | 1–0–1 | 3 | W |
| 3 | October 9 | Phoenix | 1 – 5 | Columbus | | Leclaire | 16,298 | 2–0–1 | 5 | W |
| 4 | October 14 | Columbus | 0 – 5 | Minnesota | | Leclaire | 18,568 | 2–1–1 | 5 | L |
| 5 | October 20 | Toronto | 4 – 2 | Columbus | | Leclaire | 17,303 | 2–2–1 | 5 | L |
| 6 | October 21 | Columbus | 3 – 5 | Pittsburgh | | Norrena | 14,637 | 2–3–1 | 5 | L |
| 7 | October 23 | San Jose | 3 – 0 | Columbus | | Leclaire | 16,067 | 2–4–1 | 5 | L |
| 8 | October 27 | Los Angeles | 0 – 2 | Columbus | | Leclaire | 16,087 | 3–4–1 | 7 | W |
| 9 | October 28 | Columbus | 0 – 1 | New Jersey | | Leclaire | 14,015 | 3–5–1 | 7 | L |

November: 3–10–1 (home: 2–5–1; road: 1–5–0)

| Game | Date | Visitor | Score | Home | OT | Decision | Attendance | Record | Points | Recap |
|---|---|---|---|---|---|---|---|---|---|---|
| 10 | November 1 | Colorado | 5 – 3 | Columbus | | Leclaire | 16,007 | 3–6–1 | 7 | L |
| 11 | November 3 | Calgary | 4 – 5 | Columbus | SO | Leclaire | 16,103 | 4–6–1 | 9 | W |
| 12 | November 4 | Columbus | 1 – 4 | Detroit | | Leclaire | 20,066 | 4–7–1 | 9 | L |
| 13 | November 9 | Columbus | 4 – 2 | St. Louis | | Leclaire | 9,631 | 5–7–1 | 11 | W |
| 14 | November 10 | Edmonton | 4 – 1 | Columbus | | Leclaire | 16,902 | 5–8–1 | 11 | L |
| 15 | November 12 | Columbus | 0 – 2 | Chicago | | Norrena | 14,078 | 5–9–1 | 11 | L |
| 16 | November 15 | Nashville | 5 – 4 | Columbus | | Leclaire | 16,283 | 5–10–1 | 11 | L |
| 17 | November 17 | Colorado | 3 – 0 | Columbus | | Norrena | 16,375 | 5–11–1 | 11 | L |
| 18 | November 18 | Columbus | 2 – 4 | Nashville | | Leclaire | 13,209 | 5–12–1 | 11 | L |
| 19 | November 20 | Nashville | 3 – 1 | Columbus | | Norrena | 16,174 | 5–13–1 | 11 | L |
| 20 | November 22 | St. Louis | 4 – 3 | Columbus | SO | Leclaire | 15,279 | 5–13–2 | 12 | OTL |
| 21 | November 24 | Columbus | 2 – 3 | Philadelphia | | Leclaire | 19,301 | 5–14–2 | 12 | L |
| 22 | November 25 | Minnesota | 3 – 5 | Columbus | | Norrena | 15,493 | 6–13–2 | 14 | W |
| 23 | November 28 | Columbus | 0 – 1 | Vancouver | | Leclaire | 18,630 | 6–14–2 | 14 | L |

December: 9–5–2 (home: 5–2–0; road: 4–3–2)

| Game | Date | Visitor | Score | Home | OT | Decision | Attendance | Record | Points | Recap |
|---|---|---|---|---|---|---|---|---|---|---|
| 24 | December 1 | Columbus | 1 – 2 | Calgary | | Leclaire | 19,289 | 6–16–2 | 14 | L |
| 25 | December 2 | Columbus | 4 – 0 | Edmonton | | Norrena | 16,839 | 7–16–2 | 16 | W |
| 26 | December 5 | Columbus | 3 – 0 | Colorado | | Norrena | 17,339 | 8–16–2 | 18 | W |
| 27 | December 9 | Columbus | 5 – 1 | St. Louis | | Norrena | 11,831 | 9–16–2 | 20 | W |
| 28 | December 10 | Ottawa | 2 – 6 | Columbus | | Leclaire | 15,797 | 10–16–2 | 22 | W |
| 29 | December 12 | Columbus | 3 – 1 | Dallas | | Norrena | 17,411 | 11–16–2 | 24 | W |
| 30 | December 14 | Columbus | 4 – 5 | Phoenix | SO | Norrena | 11,301 | 11–16–3 | 25 | OTL |
| 31 | December 16 | Chicago | 6 – 4 | Columbus | | Norrena | 17,288 | 11–17–3 | 25 | L |
| 32 | December 18 | Detroit | 3 – 4 | Columbus | | Norrena | 17,046 | 12–17–3 | 27 | W |
| 33 | December 20 | Columbus | 0 – 5 | Detroit | | Norrena | 20,066 | 12–18–3 | 27 | L |
| 34 | December 22 | Vancouver | 2 – 3 | Columbus | | Norrena | 15,861 | 13–18–3 | 29 | W |
| 35 | December 23 | Columbus | 0 – 4 | NY Islanders | | Norrena | 11,797 | 13–19–3 | 29 | L |
| 36 | December 26 | Boston | 4 – 5 | Columbus | OT | Norrena | 17,376 | 14–19–3 | 31 | W |
| 37 | December 28 | Detroit | 7 – 4 | Columbus | | Norrena | 17,408 | 14–20–3 | 31 | L |
| 38 | December 29 | Columbus | 3 – 4 | Minnesota | OT | Conklin | 18,568 | 14–20–4 | 32 | OTL |
| 39 | December 31 | Chicago | 1 – 3 | Columbus | | Norrena | 18,136 | 15–20–4 | 34 | W |

January: 6–6–1 (home: 3–1–1; road: 3–5–0)

| Game | Date | Visitor | Score | Home | OT | Decision | Attendance | Record | Points | Recap |
|---|---|---|---|---|---|---|---|---|---|---|
| 40 | January 3 | Columbus | 0 – 3 | Los Angeles | | Norrena | 16,451 | 15–21–4 | 34 | L |
| 41 | January 5 | Columbus | 4 – 3 | Anaheim | | Norrena | 17,405 | 16–21–4 | 36 | W |
| 42 | January 6 | Columbus | 2 – 5 | San Jose | | Norrena | 17,496 | 16–22–4 | 36 | L |
| 43 | January 9 | St. Louis | 4 – 3 | Columbus | SO | Norrena | 15,238 | 16–22–5 | 37 | OTL |
| 44 | January 12 | Columbus | 0 – 2 | Nashville | | Norrena | 14,136 | 16–23–5 | 37 | L |
| 45 | January 13 | Nashville | 4 – 1 | Columbus | | Norrena | 16,825 | 16–24–5 | 37 | L |
| 46 | January 16 | Columbus | 5 – 4 | Chicago | OT | Conklin | 10,263 | 17–24–5 | 39 | W |
| 47 | January 18 | Columbus | 0 – 4 | Nashville | | Conklin | 10,927 | 17–25–5 | 39 | L |
| 48 | January 19 | Detroit | 1 – 3 | Columbus | | Norrena | 18,136 | 18–25–5 | 41 | W |
| 49 | January 26 | Buffalo | 2 – 3 | Columbus | | Norrena | 18,136 | 19–25–5 | 43 | W |
| 50 | January 27 | Minnesota | 2 – 3 | Columbus | | Norrena | 18,136 | 20–25–5 | 45 | W |
| 51 | January 30 | Columbus | 3 – 2 | Vancouver | SO | Conklin | 18,630 | 21–25–5 | 47 | W |
| 52 | January 31 | Columbus | 2 – 5 | Edmonton | | Conklin | 16,839 | 21–26–5 | 47 | L |

February: 3–7–2 (home: 2–5–1; road: 1–2–1)

| Game | Date | Visitor | Score | Home | OT | Decision | Attendance | Record | Points | Recap |
|---|---|---|---|---|---|---|---|---|---|---|
| 53 | February 2 | Columbus | 2 – 6 | Calgary | | Conklin | 19,289 | 21–27–5 | 47 | L |
| 54 | February 6 | Phoenix | 3 – 0 | Columbus | | Norrena | 13,825 | 21–28–5 | 47 | L |
| 55 | February 8 | Calgary | 1 – 2 | Columbus | | Norrena | 15,739 | 22–28–5 | 49 | W |
| 56 | February 11 | Chicago | 5 – 4 | Columbus | | Leclaire | 17,054 | 22–29–5 | 49 | L |
| 57 | February 14 | St. Louis | 4 – 2 | Columbus | | Leclaire | 14,295 | 22–30–5 | 49 | L |
| 58 | February 16 | San Jose | 0 – 3 | Columbus | | Norrena | 16,045 | 23–30–5 | 51 | W |
| 59 | February 18 | Montreal | 3 – 2 | Columbus | | Leclaire | 16,116 | 23–31–5 | 51 | L |
| 60 | February 20 | Columbus | 4 – 5 | St. Louis | SO | Norrena | 11,104 | 23–31–6 | 52 | OTL |
| 61 | February 22 | Edmonton | 4 – 0 | Columbus | | Norrena | 15,541 | 23–32–6 | 52 | L |
| 62 | February 24 | Columbus | 3 – 2 | New York Rangers | | Norrena | 18,200 | 24–32–6 | 54 | W |
| 63 | February 25 | Nashville | 4 – 3 | Columbus | SO | Conklin | 16,220 | 24–32–7 | 55 | OTL |
| 64 | February 27 | Columbus | 2 – 3 | Colorado | | Norrena | 17,127 | 24–33–7 | 55 | L |

March: 8–6–0 (home: 3–2–0; road: 5–4–0)

| Game | Date | Visitor | Score | Home | OT | Decision | Attendance | Record | Points | Recap |
|---|---|---|---|---|---|---|---|---|---|---|
| 65 | March 2 | Columbus | 3 – 2 | Dallas | SO | Norrena | 17,147 | 25–33–7 | 57 | W |
| 66 | March 3 | Columbus | 4 – 3 | Phoenix | | Boucher | 16,207 | 26–33–7 | 59 | W |
| 67 | March 7 | Los Angeles | 2 – 3 | Columbus | OT | Norrena | 15,154 | 27–33–7 | 61 | W |
| 68 | March 9 | Dallas | 3 – 0 | Columbus | | Norrena | 17,284 | 27–34–7 | 61 | L |
| 69 | March 10 | Columbus | 1 – 2 | Nashville | | Norrena | 17,113 | 27–35–7 | 61 | L |
| 70 | March 14 | Columbus | 5 – 4 | Anaheim | SO | Norrena | 17,174 | 28–35–7 | 63 | W |
| 71 | March 16 | Columbus | 0 – 3 | San Jose | | Norrena | 17,496 | 28–36–7 | 63 | L |
| 72 | March 17 | Columbus | 3 – 5 | Los Angeles | | Norrena | 17,197 | 28–37–7 | 63 | L |
| 73 | March 20 | Chicago | 2 – 5 | Columbus | | Norrena | 15,195 | 29–37–7 | 65 | W |
| 74 | March 22 | Columbus | 2 – 1 | Detroit | SO | Norrena | 20,066 | 30–37–7 | 67 | W |
| 75 | March 25 | St. Louis | 1 – 4 | Columbus | | Norrena | 16,007 | 31–37–7 | 69 | W |
| 76 | March 27 | Columbus | 4 – 1 | St. Louis | | Norrena | 17,251 | 32–37–7 | 71 | W |
| 77 | March 29 | Anaheim | 5 – 2 | Columbus | | Norrena | 15,340 | 32–38–7 | 71 | L |
| 78 | March 30 | Columbus | 1 – 3 | Chicago | | Boucher | 14,111 | 32–39–7 | 71 | L |

April: 1–3–0 (home: 1–2–0; road: 0–1–0)

| Game | Date | Visitor | Score | Home | OT | Decision | Attendance | Record | Points | Recap |
|---|---|---|---|---|---|---|---|---|---|---|
| 79 | April 1 | Detroit | 4 – 1 | Columbus | | Norrena | 17,350 | 32–40–7 | 71 | L |
| 80 | April 3 | Columbus | 0 – 3 | Detroit | | Norrena | 20,066 | 32–41–7 | 71 | L |
| 81 | April 5 | Dallas | 1 – 2 | Columbus | OT | Norrena | 15,997 | 33–41–7 | 73 | W |
| 82 | April 7 | Anaheim | 4 – 3 | Columbus | | Norrena | 17,391 | 33–42–7 | 73 | L |

Legend: W Win (2 points) L Loss (0 points) OTL Overtime/shootout loss (1 point)

== Player statistics ==
=== Scoring ===
- Position abbreviations: C = Center; D = Defense; G = Goaltender; LW = Left wing; RW = Right wing
- † = Joined team via a transaction (e.g., trade, waivers, signing) during the season. Stats reflect time with the Blue Jackets only.
- ‡ = Left team via a transaction (e.g., trade, waivers, release) during the season. Stats reflect time with the Blue Jackets only.

| No. | Player | Pos | Regular season | | | | | |
| No. | Player | Pos | GP | G | A | Pts | +/- | PIM |
|---|---|---|---|---|---|---|---|---|
| 9 | David Vyborny | RW | 82 | 16 | 48 | 64 | 6 | 60 |
| 61 | Rick Nash | LW | 75 | 27 | 30 | 57 | −8 | 73 |
| 33 | Fredrik Modin | LW | 79 | 22 | 20 | 42 | −3 | 50 |
| 91 | Sergei Fedorov | C | 73 | 18 | 24 | 42 | −7 | 56 |
| 25 | Jason Chimera | LW | 82 | 15 | 21 | 36 | 2 | 91 |
| 6 | Ron Hainsey | D | 80 | 9 | 25 | 34 | −19 | 69 |
| 13 | Nikolay Zherdev | W | 71 | 10 | 22 | 32 | −19 | 26 |
| 49 | Dan Fritsche | C | 59 | 12 | 15 | 27 | 3 | 35 |
| 77 | Anson Carter‡ | RW | 54 | 10 | 17 | 27 | −1 | 16 |
| 27 | Manny Malhotra | C | 82 | 9 | 16 | 25 | −8 | 76 |
| 2 | Anders Eriksson | D | 79 | 0 | 23 | 23 | 12 | 46 |
| 97 | Rostislav Klesla | D | 75 | 9 | 13 | 22 | −13 | 105 |
| 17 | Gilbert Brule | C | 78 | 9 | 10 | 19 | −21 | 28 |
| 16 | Alexander Svitov | C | 76 | 7 | 11 | 18 | −10 | 145 |
| 52 | Adam Foote | D | 59 | 3 | 9 | 12 | −17 | 71 |
| 10 | Duvie Westcott | D | 23 | 4 | 6 | 10 | −13 | 18 |
| 44 | Aaron Johnson | D | 61 | 3 | 7 | 10 | −9 | 38 |
| 47 | Geoff Platt | C | 26 | 4 | 5 | 9 | 1 | 10 |
| 55 | Ole-Kristian Tollefsen | D | 70 | 2 | 3 | 5 | 2 | 123 |
| 48 | Marc Methot | D | 20 | 0 | 4 | 4 | 5 | 12 |
| 42 | Mark Hartigan‡ | C | 6 | 1 | 2 | 3 | 2 | 2 |
| 4 | Bryan Berard | D | 11 | 0 | 3 | 3 | −4 | 8 |
| 23 | Derrick Walser† | D | 9 | 2 | 0 | 2 | −1 | 0 |
| 40 | Jaroslav Balastik‡ | RW | 8 | 1 | 1 | 2 | −3 | 4 |
| 45 | Jody Shelley | LW | 72 | 1 | 1 | 2 | −6 | 125 |
| 38 | Joakim Lindstrom | C | 9 | 1 | 0 | 1 | −3 | 4 |
| 37 | Joe Motzko‡ | RW | 7 | 1 | 0 | 1 | 0 | 0 |
| 19 | Alexandre Picard | LW | 23 | 0 | 1 | 1 | −3 | 6 |
| 35 | Brian Boucher† | G | 3 | 0 | 0 | 0 | | 0 |
| 37 | Darcy Campbell† | D | 1 | 0 | 0 | 0 | 0 | 0 |
| 35 | Ty Conklin‡ | G | 11 | 0 | 0 | 0 | | 0 |
| 20 | Curtis Glencross† | C | 7 | 0 | 0 | 0 | −4 | 0 |
| 39 | Steven Goertzen | RW | 7 | 0 | 0 | 0 | 0 | 10 |
| 28 | Zenon Konopka† | C | 6 | 0 | 0 | 0 | −2 | 20 |
| 31 | Pascal Leclaire | G | 24 | 0 | 0 | 0 | | 2 |
| 30 | Fredrik Norrena | G | 55 | 0 | 0 | 0 | | 6 |
| 46 | Filip Novak | D | 6 | 0 | 0 | 0 | 1 | 2 |
| 1 | Tomas Popperle | G | 2 | 0 | 0 | 0 | | 0 |

=== Goaltending ===
- † = Joined team via a transaction (e.g., trade, waivers, signing) during the season. Stats reflect time with the Blue Jackets only.
- ‡ = Left team via a transaction (e.g., trade, waivers, release) during the season. Stats reflect time with the Blue Jackets only.

| No. | Player | Regular season | | | | | | | | | |
| No. | Player | GP | W | L | OT | SA | GA | GAA | SV% | SO | TOI |
|---|---|---|---|---|---|---|---|---|---|---|---|
| 30 | Fredrik Norrena | 55 | 24 | 23 | 3 | 1420 | 137 | 2.79 | .904 | 3 | 2952 |
| 31 | Pascal Leclaire | 24 | 6 | 15 | 2 | 629 | 65 | 2.97 | .897 | 1 | 1315 |
| 35 | Ty Conklin‡ | 11 | 2 | 3 | 2 | 210 | 27 | 3.30 | .871 | 0 | 491 |
| 35 | Brian Boucher† | 3 | 1 | 1 | 0 | 67 | 9 | 3.79 | .866 | 0 | 142 |
| 1 | Tomas Popperle | 2 | 0 | 0 | 0 | 14 | 1 | 1.35 | .929 | 0 | 45 |

== Awards and records ==
=== Awards ===
| Type | Award/honor | Recipient | Ref |
|---|---|---|---|
| League (in-season) | NHL All-Star Game selection | Rick Nash | |
| League (in-season) | NHL Second Star of the Week | Fredrik Norrena (January 28) | |
| Team | Foundation Community Service Award | Jody Shelley | |
| Team | "Jackets Fans" Most Valuable Player Award | Fredrik Norrena | |
| Team | "John H. McConnell" Most Courageous Player Award | Fredrik Modin | |
| Team | Most Improved Player Award | Ole-Kristian Tollefsen | |
| Team | Outstanding Defenseman Award | Rostislav Klesla | |
| Team | Three Stars Award | Rick Nash | |

=== Milestones ===
| Milestone | Player | Date | Ref |
|---|---|---|---|
| First game | Fredrik Norrena | October 14, 2006 | |
| First game | Tomas Popperle | February 2, 2007 | |
| First game | Marc Methot | February 25, 2007 | |
| First game | Darcy Campbell | March 30, 2007 | |

== Transactions ==
The Blue Jackets were involved in the following transactions from June 20, 2006, the day after the deciding game of the 2006 Stanley Cup Finals, through June 6, 2007, the day of the deciding game of the 2007 Stanley Cup Finals.

=== Trades ===
| Date | Details | | Ref |
|---|---|---|---|
| June 24, 2006 | To Columbus Blue Jackets: Philadelphia's 3rd-round pick in 2006; 4th-round pick in 2006; 2nd-round pick in 2007 | To San Jose Sharks: 2nd-round pick in 2006 | |
| June 24, 2006 | To Columbus Blue Jackets: 7th-round pick in 2006 | To Los Angeles Kings: 7th-round pick in 2007 | |
| June 30, 2006 | To Columbus Blue Jackets: Fredrik Modin; Fredrik Norrena | To Tampa Bay Lightning: Marc Denis | |
| October 25, 2006 | To Columbus Blue Jackets: Ryan Caldwell | To New York Islanders: Eric Boguniecki | |
| November 29, 2006 | To Columbus Blue Jackets: Derrick Walser | To Carolina Hurricanes: Mark Flood | |
| January 26, 2007 | To Columbus Blue Jackets: Curtis Glencross; Zenon Konopka; Conditional 7th-round pick in 2007 or 2008 | To Anaheim Ducks: Mark Hartigan; Joe Motzko; 4th-round pick in 2007 | |
| February 23, 2007 | To Columbus Blue Jackets: 5th-round pick in 2008 | To Carolina Hurricanes: Anson Carter | |
| February 27, 2007 | To Columbus Blue Jackets: 5th-round pick in 2007 | To Buffalo Sabres: Ty Conklin | |
| May 16, 2007 | To Columbus Blue Jackets: 5th-round pick in 2007 | To Boston Bruins: Rights to Adam McQuaid | |

=== Players acquired ===
| Date | Player | Former team | Term | Via | Ref |
|---|---|---|---|---|---|
| July 1, 2006 | Anders Eriksson | Metallurg Magnitogorsk (RSL) | 1-year | Free agency | |
| July 6, 2006 | Ty Conklin | Edmonton Oilers | | Free agency | |
| July 6, 2006 | Tomas Kloucek | Atlanta Thrashers | | Free agency | |
| July 21, 2006 | Janne Hauhtonen | HIFK (Liiga) | 1-year | Free agency | |
| August 9, 2006 | Filip Novak | Ottawa Senators | 2-year | Free agency | |
| August 22, 2006 | Eric Boguniecki | Pittsburgh Penguins | 1-year | Free agency | |
| September 13, 2006 | Anson Carter | Vancouver Canucks | 1-year | Free agency | |
| February 27, 2007 | Brian Boucher | Chicago Blackhawks | | Waivers | |
| March 24, 2007 | Darcy Campbell | University of Alaska Fairbanks (CCHA) | 2-year | Free agency | |
| June 1, 2007 | Mikko Maenpaa | HPK (Liiga) | 1-year | Free agency | |

=== Players lost ===
| Date | Player | New team | Via (Note: In parentheses is the player's free agency group on July 1 if applicable.) | Ref |
|---|---|---|---|---|
| July 1, 2006 | Andy Delmore | Tampa Bay Lightning | Free agency (III) | |
| July 6, 2006 | Trevor Letowski | Carolina Hurricanes | Free agency (III) | |
| July 9, 2006 | Mike Rupp | New Jersey Devils | Free agency (UFA) | |
| July 27, 2006 | Tyler Kolarik | Syracuse Crunch (AHL) | Free agency (UFA) | |
| July 29, 2006 | Cam Severson | Straubing Tigers (DEL) | Free agency (VI) | |
| August 17, 2006 | Jeff MacMillan | Vienna Capitals (EBEL) | Free agency (VI) | |
| August 18, 2006 | Andrew Penner | Pittsburgh Penguins | Free agency (UFA) | |
| August 18, 2006 | Radoslav Suchy | ZSC Lions (NLA) | Free agency (III) | |
| August 28, 2006 | Jan Hrdina | HV71 (SHL) | Free agency (III) | |
| August 30, 2006 | Darcy Verot | Syracuse Crunch (AHL) | Free agency (III) | |
| September 2, 2006 | Aleksandr Guskov | HC Lada Togliatti (RSL) | Free agency (III) | |
| October 2006 | Greg Mauldin | Bloomington PrairieThunder (UHL) | Free agency (UFA) | |
| October 2006 | Ben Simon | Syracuse Crunch (AHL) | Free agency (UFA) | |
| December 7, 2006 | Brandon Sugden | | Retirement (Note: Sugden resumed his career in the semi-professional LNAH, signing with the Saint–Jean Chiefs on January 6, 2007.) | |

=== Signings ===
| Date | Player | Term | Contract type | Ref |
|---|---|---|---|---|
| June 20, 2006 | Manny Malhotra | 3-year | Re-signing | |
| July 1, 2006 | Jaroslav Balastik | 1-year | Re-signing | |
| July 1, 2006 | Alexander Svitov | 1-year | Re-signing | |
| July 1, 2006 | Kris Russell | | Entry-level | |
| July 11, 2006 | Ron Hainsey | 2-year | Re-signing | |
| July 18, 2006 | Pascal Leclaire | 2-year | Re-signing | |
| July 21, 2006 | Jamie Pushor | 1-year | Re-signing | |
| July 22, 2006 | Jason Chimera | 2-year | Re-signing | |
| August 30, 2006 | Brandon Sugden | | Re-signing | |
| September 1, 2006 | Aaron Johnson | | Re-signing | |
| September 8, 2006 | Trevor Hendrikx | 3-year | Entry-level | |
| September 11, 2006 | Duvie Westcott | 3-year | Extension | |
| September 14, 2006 | Dan Fritsche | 2-year | Re-signing | |
| September 21, 2006 | Derick Brassard | 3-year | Entry-level | |
| September 28, 2006 | Nikolay Zherdev | 3-year | Re-signing | |
| February 11, 2007 | Fredrik Norrena | 2-year | Extension | |
| February 26, 2007 | Fredrik Modin | 3-year | Extension | |
| March 19, 2007 | Jon Landry | 2-year | Entry-level | |
| March 27, 2007 | Tom Sestito | 3-year | Entry-level | |
| April 7, 2007 | Jared Boll | 3-year | Entry-level | |
| April 7, 2007 | Derek Dorsett | 3-year | Entry-level | |
| May 3, 2007 | Steve Mason | 3-year | Entry-level | |
| May 25, 2007 | Kirill Starkov | 3-year | Entry-level | |

== Draft picks ==
Columbus' picks at the 2006 NHL entry draft in Vancouver, British Columbia. The Blue Jackets picked 6th overall.

| Round | # | Player | Nationality | NHL team | College/Junior/Club team (League) |
|---|---|---|---|---|---|
| 1 | 6 | Derick Brassard (C) | Canada | Columbus Blue Jackets | Drummondville Voltigeurs (QMJHL) |
| 3 | 69 | Steve Mason (G) | Canada | Columbus Blue Jackets | London Knights (OHL) |
| 3 | 85 | Tommy Sestito (LW) | United States | Columbus Blue Jackets (from San Jose via Philadelphia) | Plymouth Whalers (OHL) |
| 4 | 113 | Ben Wright (D) | Canada | Columbus Blue Jackets (from San Jose) | Lethbridge Hurricanes (WHL) |
| 5 | 129 | Robert Nyholm (RW) | Finland | Columbus Blue Jackets | HIFK Jr. (Finland) |
| 5 | 136 | Nick Sucharski (LW) | Canada | Columbus Blue Jackets (from Toronto) | Michigan State University (NCAA) |
| 5 | 142 | Maxim Frechette (D) | Canada | Columbus Blue Jackets (from Anaheim) | Drummondville Voltigeurs (QMJHL) |
| 6 | 159 | Jesse Dudas (D) | Canada | Columbus Blue Jackets | Prince George Cougars (WHL) |
| 7 | 189 | Derek Dorsett (RW) | Canada | Columbus Blue Jackets | Medicine Hat Tigers (WHL) |
| 7 | 194 | Matt Marquardt (LW) | Canada | Columbus Blue Jackets (from Los Angeles) | Moncton Wildcats (QMJHL) |

== Farm teams ==
=== Syracuse Crunch ===
The Syracuse Crunch are the Blue Jackets American Hockey League affiliate for the seventh season. Prior to the start of the 2006–07 season, the two clubs announced they had agreed to extend the affiliation agreement for four more years.

=== Dayton Bombers ===
The Dayton Bombers of the ECHL are also entering their seventh season as an affiliate of the Blue Jackets.

=== Youngstown SteelHounds ===
The Jackets are also affiliated with the Youngstown SteelHounds of the Central Hockey League.

== See also ==
- 2006–07 NHL season
