= List of Columbus Blue Jackets award winners =

Columbus Blue Jackets awards

Team trophies
- Award*: Wins
- Stanley Cup: 0

Individual awards
- Award*: Wins
- Bill Masterton Memorial Trophy: 1
- Calder Memorial Trophy: 1
- Jack Adams Award: 1
- James Norris Memorial Trophy: 1
- King Clancy Memorial Trophy: 1
- Mark Messier Leadership Award: 1
- Maurice "Rocket" Richard Trophy: 1
- NHL Foundation Player Award: 1
- Vezina Trophy: 2

Total
- Awards won: 9

This is a list of Columbus Blue Jackets award winners.

== League awards ==
=== Team trophies ===
The Columbus Blue Jackets have not won any of the team trophies the National Hockey League (NHL) awards annually — the Stanley Cup as league champions, the Prince of Wales Trophy as Eastern Conference playoff champions and the Presidents' Trophy as the team with the most regular season points.

=== Individual awards ===
Individual awards won by Columbus Blue Jackets players and staff
Award	Description	Winner	Season	References
Bill Masterton Memorial Trophy	Perseverance, sportsmanship and dedication to hockey	Sean Monahan	2024–25	
Calder Memorial Trophy	Rookie of the year	Steve Mason	2008–09	
Jack Adams Award	Best coach	John Tortorella	2016–17	
James Norris Memorial Trophy	Best defenseman	Zach Werenski	2025–26	
King Clancy Memorial Trophy	Leadership / Humanitarian	Nick Foligno	2016–17	
Mark Messier Leadership Award	Leadership	Nick Foligno	2016–17	
Maurice "Rocket" Richard Trophy	Most goals in the regular season	Rick Nash	2003–04 (Note: Shared with Ilya Kovalchuk of the Atlanta Thrashers, and Jarome Iginla of the Calgary Flames.)	
NHL Foundation Player Award	Community service	Rick Nash	2008–09	
Vezina Trophy	Top goaltender	Sergei Bobrovsky	2012–13	
Vezina Trophy	Top goaltender	Sergei Bobrovsky	2016–17	

== All-Stars ==
=== NHL first and second team All-Stars ===
The NHL first and second team All-Stars are the top players at each position as voted on by the Professional Hockey Writers' Association.

Columbus Blue Jackets selected to the NHL First and Second Team All-Stars
Player	Position	Selections	Season	Team
Sergei Bobrovsky	Goaltender	2	2012–13	1st
Sergei Bobrovsky	Goaltender	2	2016–17	1st
Seth Jones	Defense	1	2017–18	2nd
Steve Mason	Goaltender	1	2008–09	2nd
Zach Werenski	Defense	2	2024–25	1st
Zach Werenski	Defense	2	2025–26	1st

=== NHL All-Rookie Team ===
The NHL All-Rookie Team consists of the top rookies at each position as voted on by the Professional Hockey Writers' Association.

Columbus Blue Jackets selected to the NHL All-Rookie Team
Player	Position	Season
Rostislav Klesla	Defense	2001–02
Steve Mason	Goaltender	2008–09
Denton Mateychuk	Defense	2024–25
Elvis Merzlikins	Goaltender	2019–20
Rick Nash	Forward	2002–03
Zach Werenski	Defense	2016–17

=== All-Star Game selections ===
The National Hockey League All-Star Game is a mid-season exhibition game held annually between many of the top players of each season. Fourteen All-Star Games have been held since the Columbus Blue Jackets entered the league in 2000, with at least one player chosen to represent the Blue Jackets in each year except 2001 and 2012. The All-Star game has not been held in various years: 1979 and 1987 due to the 1979 Challenge Cup and Rendez-vous '87 series between the NHL and the Soviet national team, respectively, 1995, 2005 and 2013 as a result of labor stoppages, 2006, 2010, 2014 and 2026 because of the Winter Olympic Games, 2021 as a result of the COVID-19 pandemic, and 2025 when it was replaced by the 2025 4 Nations Face-Off. Columbus has hosted one of the games. The 60th took place at Nationwide Arena.

- ↑ All-Star Game Most Valuable Player

Columbus Blue Jackets players and coaches selected to the All-Star Game
Game	Year	Name	Position	References
51st	2001	No Blue Jackets selected	—	
52nd	2002	Espen Knutsen	Center	
53rd	2003	Ray Whitney	Left Wing	
54th	2004	Rick Nash	Left Wing	
55th	2007	Rick Nash	Left Wing	
56th	2008	Rick Nash	Left Wing	
57th	2009	Rick Nash	Left Wing	
58th	2011	Rick Nash	Left Wing	
59th	2012	No Blue Jackets selected	—	
60th	2015	Sergei Bobrovsky (Did not play)	Goaltender	
60th	2015	Nick Foligno	Left Wing	
60th	2015	Ryan Johansen↑	Center	
61st	2016	Brandon Saad	Left Wing	
62nd	2017	Cam Atkinson (Replaced Evgeni Malkin)	Right Wing	
62nd	2017	Sergei Bobrovsky	Goaltender	
62nd	2017	Seth Jones	Defense	
62nd	2017	John Tortorella (Note: Tortorella was named coach of the Metropolitan Division All-Stars on January 10 but missed the game because of personal reasons. He was replaced by Wayne Gretzky.)	Coach	
63rd	2018	Seth Jones (Did not play)	Defense	
63rd	2018	Zach Werenski (Replaced Jones)	Defense	
64th	2019	Cam Atkinson	Right Wing	
64th	2019	Seth Jones	Defense	
65th	2020	Seth Jones	Defense	
65th	2020	Joonas Korpisalo (Did not play)	Goaltender	
66th	2022	Zach Werenski	Defense	
67th	2023	Johnny Gaudreau	Left Wing	
68th	2024	Boone Jenner	Center	

=== All-Star Game replacement events ===
Columbus Blue Jackets players and coaches selected to All-Star Game replacement events
Event	Year	Name	Position	References
4 Nations Face-Off	2025	Zach Werenski (United States)	Defense	

== Career achievements ==
=== Hockey Hall of Fame ===
The following is a list of Columbus Blue Jackets who have been enshrined in the Hockey Hall of Fame.

Columbus Blue Jackets inducted into the Hockey Hall of Fame
Individual	Category	Year inducted	Years with Blue Jackets in category	References
Sergei Fedorov	Player	2015	2005–2008	
Ken Hitchcock	Builder	2023	2006–2010	

=== Retired numbers ===
The Columbus Blue Jackets have retired one of their jersey numbers. Also out of circulation is the number 99 which was retired league-wide for Wayne Gretzky on February 6, 2000.

Columbus Blue Jackets retired numbers
Number	Player	Position	Years with Blue Jackets as a player	Date of retirement ceremony	References
61	Rick Nash	Left Wing	2002–2012	March 5, 2022	

== Team awards ==
=== Columbus Blue Jackets Foundation Community Service Award ===
The Columbus Blue Jackets Foundation Community Service Award is an annual award given to the player "who went above and beyond off the ice in support of charitable initiatives benefiting those in need throughout the community" as determined by the Blue Jackets Foundation and community development staff.

Season	Winner
2002–03	Tyler Wright
2003–04	Luke Richardson
2005–06	Manny Malhotra
2006–07	Jody Shelley
2007–08	Dan Fritsche
2008–09	Rick Nash

Season	Winner
2009–10	R. J. Umberger
2010–11	Jared Boll
2011–12	Marc Methot
2012–13	Derek MacKenzie
2013–14	Derek MacKenzie
2014–15	Nick Foligno

Season	Winner
2015–16	David Clarkson
2016–17	Nick Foligno
2017–18	Sergei Bobrovsky
2018–19	Nick Foligno

=== "Jackets Fans" Most Valuable Player Award ===
The "Jackets Fans" Most Valuable Player Award is an annual award given to the team's Most Valuable Player as determined by the fans.

Season	Winner
2006–07	Fredrik Norrena
2007–08	Rick Nash
2008–09	Steve Mason
2009–10	Rick Nash

Season	Winner
2010–11	R. J. Umberger
2011–12	Derek Dorsett
2012–13	Sergei Bobrovsky
2013–14	Ryan Johansen

Season	Winner
2014–15	Nick Foligno
2015–16	Boone Jenner
2016–17	Sergei Bobrovsky
2017–18	Artemi Panarin

=== "John H. McConnell" Most Courageous Player Award ===
The "John H. McConnell" Most Courageous Player Award is an annual award given to the player who "day in and day out exhibited hard work, dedication and a willingness to overcome obstacles in his commitment to the team" as determined by Blue Jackets players.

Season	Winner
2006–07	Fredrik Modin
2007–08	Rick Nash
2008–09	Andrew Murray
2009–10	Jared Boll

Season	Winner
2010–11	R. J. Umberger
2011–12	Derek Dorsett
2012–13	Sergei Bobrovsky
2013–14	Derek MacKenzie

Season	Winner
2014–15	Sergei Bobrovsky
2015–16	Boone Jenner
2016–17	Sergei Bobrovsky
2017–18	Seth Jones

=== Most Improved Player Award ===
The Most Improved Player Award is an annual award given to the player "deemed to have improved the most during the course of the regular season" as determined by the team's television and radio broadcasters.

Season	Winner
2006–07	Ole-Kristian Tollefsen
2007–08	Pascal Leclaire
2008–09	Marc Methot
2009–10	Kris Russell

Season	Winner
2010–11	Derek MacKenzie
2011–12	Derek Dorsett
2012–13	Matt Calvert
2013–14	Ryan Johansen

Season	Winner
2014–15	Nick Foligno
2015–16	Boone Jenner
2016–17	Alexander Wennberg
2017–18	Seth Jones

=== Outstanding Defenseman Award ===
The Outstanding Defenseman Award is given the team's top defenseman as determined by members of the local media.

Season	Winner
2006–07	Rostislav Klesla
2007–08	Jan Hejda
2008–09	Jan Hejda
2009–10	Kris Russell

Season	Winner
2010–11	Fedor Tyutin
2011–12	Nikita Nikitin
2012–13	Fedor Tyutin
2013–14	James Wisniewski

Season	Winner
2014–15	David Savard
2015–16	Ryan Murray
2016–17	Seth Jones
2017–18	Seth Jones

=== Three Stars Award ===
The Three Stars Award is an annual award given to the player who earns the most points from Star of the game selections throughout the regular season.

Season	Winner
2000–01	Ron Tugnutt
2001–02	Ray Whitney
2002–03	Marc Denis
2003–04	Rick Nash
2005–06	Rick Nash
2006–07	Rick Nash

Season	Winner
2007–08	Rick Nash
2008–09	Steve Mason
2009–10	Steve Mason
2010–11	Rick Nash
2011–12	Steve Mason
2012–13	Sergei Bobrovsky

Season	Winner
2013–14	Sergei Bobrovsky
2014–15	Sergei Bobrovsky
2015–16	Boone Jenner
2016–17	Sergei Bobrovsky
2017–18	Sergei Bobrovsky

== See also ==
- List of National Hockey League awards
