= 2002–03 Columbus Blue Jackets season =

National Hockey League season

2002–03 Columbus Blue Jackets
- Division: 5th Central
- Conference: 15th Western
- 2002–03 record: 29–42–8–3
- Home record: 20–14–5–2
- Road record: 9–28–3–1
- Goals for: 213
- Goals against: 263

Team information
- General manager: Doug MacLean
- Coach: Dave King (Oct-Jan); Doug MacLean (Jan-Apr)
- Captain: Ray Whitney
- Alternate captains: Luke Richardson; Geoff Sanderson
- Arena: Nationwide Arena
- Average attendance: 17,744
- Minor league affiliates: Syracuse Crunch (AHL); Dayton Bombers (ECHL)

Team leaders
- Goals: Geoff Sanderson (34)
- Assists: Ray Whitney (52)
- Points: Ray Whitney (76)
- Penalty minutes: Jody Shelley (249)
- Plus/minus: David Vyborny (+12)
- Wins: Marc Denis (27)
- Goals against average: Marc Denis (3.09)

The 2002–03 Columbus Blue Jackets season was the Blue Jackets' third season in the National Hockey League (NHL), as the team was coming off of a 22–47–8–5 record in the 2001–02 season, earning 57 points and finishing in last in the Western Conference for the first time in franshise history and missed the playoffs for the third year in a row for the first time in franshise history.

== Offseason ==
Ray Whitney was named team captain on October 9.

== Regular season ==
The Blue Jackets got off to a good start, having a 7–5–1–1 record in their opening 14 games. Columbus, however, won only two of their next 12 games to fall out of the playoff picture. The club would play mediocre hockey for the rest of the season, finishing with a 29–42–8–3 record, earning 69 points for last place in the Western Conference for the second-straight season. Midway through the season, Columbus fired head coach Dave King after a 14–20–4–2 start. King was replaced by general manager Doug MacLean on an interim basis, as the Blue Jackets posted a record of 15–22–4–1 record under his guidance. The 69 points was a 12-point improvement over the previous season, but the club finished 23 points behind the Edmonton Oilers for the final playoff spot in the Conference. The previous season, the Blue Jackets scored a League-low 164 goals, however, the team would beat that total by 49 goals, finishing with a club record 213 goals. Columbus though led the NHL in goals against, allowing 263, also a club record.

Ray Whitney led the club in points for the second-straight season, earning a club record 76 points, as he scored 24 goals and 52 assists. Geoff Sanderson rebounded from an injury-plagued 2001–02 season to score a club record 34 goals, while Andrew Cassels earned 68 points in his first season in Columbus. David Vyborny had a breakout season, scoring 20 goals and 46 points. On the blueline, Jaroslav Spacek scored nine goals and earned 45 points in his first full season with the team. Jody Shelley led the team with 249 penalty minutes, setting a franchise record.

In goal, Marc Denis got the bulk of the action, winning a club-record 27 games, while posting a 3.09 goals against average (GAA) and earning five shutouts along the way.

=== Season standings ===
Central Division
No.	CR		GP	W	L	T	OTL	GF	GA	Pts
1	2	**Detroit Red Wings**	82	48	20	10	4	269	203	110
2	5	**St. Louis Blues**	82	41	24	11	6	253	222	99
3	9	Chicago Blackhawks	82	30	33	13	6	207	226	79
4	13	Nashville Predators	82	27	35	13	7	183	206	74
5	15	Columbus Blue Jackets	82	29	42	8	3	213	263	69

Note: CR = Conference rank; GP = Games played; W = Wins; L = Losses; T = Ties; OTL = Overtime loss; GF = Goals for; GA = Goals against; Pts = Points
Bolded teams qualified for the playoffs.

Western Conference
R		Div	GP	W	L	T	OTL	GF	GA	Pts
**1**	**Z-** Dallas Stars	**PA**	**82**	**46**	**17**	**15**	**4**	**245**	**169**	111
**2**	**Y-** Detroit Red Wings	**CE**	**82**	**48**	**20**	**10**	**4**	**269**	**203**	110
**3**	**Y-** Colorado Avalanche	**NW**	**82**	**42**	**19**	**13**	**8**	**251**	**194**	105
**4**	**X-** Vancouver Canucks	**NW**	**82**	**45**	**23**	**13**	**1**	**264**	**208**	104
**5**	**X-** St. Louis Blues	**CE**	**82**	**41**	**24**	**11**	**6**	**253**	**222**	99
**6**	**X-** Minnesota Wild	**NW**	**82**	**42**	**29**	**10**	**1**	**198**	**178**	95
**7**	**X-** Mighty Ducks of Anaheim	**PA**	**82**	**40**	**27**	**9**	**6**	**203**	**193**	95
**8**	**X-** Edmonton Oilers	**NW**	**82**	**36**	**26**	**11**	**9**	**231**	**230**	92
8.5
9	Chicago Blackhawks	CE	82	30	33	13	6	207	226	79
10	Los Angeles Kings	PA	82	33	37	6	6	203	221	78
11	Phoenix Coyotes	PA	82	31	35	11	5	204	230	78
12	Calgary Flames	NW	82	29	36	13	4	186	228	75
13	Nashville Predators	CE	82	27	35	13	7	183	206	74
14	San Jose Sharks	PA	82	28	37	9	8	214	239	73
15	Columbus Blue Jackets	CE	82	29	42	8	3	213	263	69

Divisions: PA – Pacific, CE – Central, NW – Northwest

Z – Clinched conference; Y – Clinched division; X – Clinched playoff spot

== Schedule and results ==
2002–03 regular season
October: 3–5–1–0 (home: 3–2–1–0; road: 0–3–0–0)

Game	Date	Visitor	Score	Home	Record	Pts	Recap
1	October 10	Chicago Blackhawks	1–2	Columbus Blue Jackets	1–0–0–0	2	W
2	October 12	Columbus Blue Jackets	2–3	New Jersey Devils	1–1–0–0	2	L
3	October 14	Phoenix Coyotes	4–2	Columbus Blue Jackets	1–2–0–0	2	L
4	October 17	Columbus Blue Jackets	1–7	St. Louis Blues	1–3–0–0	2	L
5	October 19	Florida Panthers	1–4	Columbus Blue Jackets	2–3–0–0	4	W
6	October 23	Tampa Bay Lightning	2–2	Columbus Blue Jackets	2–3–1–0	5	T
7	October 25	San Jose Sharks	5–4	Columbus Blue Jackets	2–4–1–0	5	L
8	October 27	Los Angeles Kings	1–5	Columbus Blue Jackets	3–4–1–0	7	W
9	October 29	Columbus Blue Jackets	2–3	Chicago Blackhawks	3–5–1–0	7	L

November: 6–6–1–2 (home: 4–3–0–1; road: 2–3–1–1)

Game	Date	Visitor	Score	Home	Record	Pts	Recap
10	November 1	Dallas Stars	2–4	Columbus Blue Jackets	4–5–1–0	9	W
11	November 3	Buffalo Sabres	2–3	Columbus Blue Jackets	5–5–1–0	11	W
12	November 5	Washington Capitals	4–3	Columbus Blue Jackets	5–5–1–1	12	OTL
13	November 7	Columbus Blue Jackets	5–2	St. Louis Blues	6–5–1–1	14	W
14	November 9	New York Rangers	3–6	Columbus Blue Jackets	7–5–1–1	16	W
15	November 12	Columbus Blue Jackets	4–5	Colorado Avalanche	7–6–1–1	16	L
16	November 14	Mighty Ducks of Anaheim	3–2	Columbus Blue Jackets	7–7–1–1	16	L
17	November 16	Columbus Blue Jackets	1–1	Nashville Predators	7–7–2–1	17	T
18	November 17	Columbus Blue Jackets	2–3	Dallas Stars	7–7–2–2	18	OTL
19	November 20	St. Louis Blues	2–3	Columbus Blue Jackets	8–7–2–2	20	W
20	November 22	Columbus Blue Jackets	4–5	Buffalo Sabres	8–8–2–2	20	L
21	November 23	Columbus Blue Jackets	2–5	Ottawa Senators	8–9–2–2	20	L
22	November 27	Edmonton Oilers	3–1	Columbus Blue Jackets	8–10–2–2	20	L
23	November 29	Columbus Blue Jackets	4–2	New York Islanders	9–10–2–2	22	W
24	November 30	Carolina Hurricanes	4–2	Columbus Blue Jackets	9–11–2–2	22	L

December: 4–8–1–0 (home: 3–2–0–0; road: 1–6–1–0)

Game	Date	Visitor	Score	Home	Record	Pts	Recap
25	December 3	Columbus Blue Jackets	3–5	New York Rangers	9–12–2–2	22	L
26	December 6	Columbus Blue Jackets	2–3	San Jose Sharks	9–13–2–2	22	L
27	December 7	Columbus Blue Jackets	4–2	Los Angeles Kings	10–13–2–2	24	W
28	December 9	Columbus Blue Jackets	2–2	Phoenix Coyotes	10–13–3–2	25	T
29	December 12	New Jersey Devils	2–4	Columbus Blue Jackets	11–13–3–2	27	W
30	December 14	Columbus Blue Jackets	4–6	Detroit Red Wings	11–14–3–2	27	L
31	December 19	Calgary Flames	0–3	Columbus Blue Jackets	12–14–3–2	29	W
32	December 20	Columbus Blue Jackets	1–3	Chicago Blackhawks	12–15–3–2	29	L
33	December 23	Detroit Red Wings	1–0	Columbus Blue Jackets	12–16–3–2	29	L
34	December 26	Columbus Blue Jackets	2–4	Detroit Red Wings	12–17–3–2	29	L
35	December 28	St. Louis Blues	6–1	Columbus Blue Jackets	12–18–3–2	29	L
36	December 29	Columbus Blue Jackets	2–5	St. Louis Blues	12–19–3–2	29	L
37	December 31	Pittsburgh Penguins	2–5	Columbus Blue Jackets	13–19–3–2	31	W

January: 7–6–2–0 (home: 4–2–1–0; road: 3–4–1–0)

Game	Date	Visitor	Score	Home	Record	Pts	Recap
38	January 3	Columbus Blue Jackets	2–2	Washington Capitals	13–19–4–2	32	T
39	January 4	Phoenix Coyotes	0–2	Columbus Blue Jackets	14–19–4–2	34	W
40	January 6	Nashville Predators	5–1	Columbus Blue Jackets	14–20–4–2	34	L
41	January 8	Columbus Blue Jackets	2–1	Minnesota Wild	15–20–4–2	36	W
42	January 10	Columbus Blue Jackets	3–2	Vancouver Canucks	16–20–4–2	38	W
43	January 11	Columbus Blue Jackets	7–2	Calgary Flames	17–20–4–2	40	W
44	January 13	Columbus Blue Jackets	5–8	Edmonton Oilers	17–21–4–2	40	L
45	January 15	Mighty Ducks of Anaheim	4–3	Columbus Blue Jackets	17–22–4–2	40	L
46	January 18	Columbus Blue Jackets	2–7	Boston Bruins	17–23–4–2	40	L
47	January 20	Chicago Blackhawks	1–5	Columbus Blue Jackets	18–23–4–2	42	W
48	January 22	Columbus Blue Jackets	2–4	Dallas Stars	18–24–4–2	42	L
49	January 23	Columbus Blue Jackets	0–5	Colorado Avalanche	18–25–4–2	42	L
50	January 25	New York Islanders	1–4	Columbus Blue Jackets	19–25–4–2	44	W
51	January 28	Colorado Avalanche	2–2	Columbus Blue Jackets	19–25–5–2	45	T
52	January 30	Nashville Predators	1–2	Columbus Blue Jackets	20–25–5–2	47	W

February: 3–7–1–0 (home: 2–1–1–0; road: 1–6–0–0)

Game	Date	Visitor	Score	Home	Record	Pts	Recap
53	February 5	Vancouver Canucks	4–4	Columbus Blue Jackets	20–25–6–2	48	T
54	February 8	Columbus Blue Jackets	2–3	Nashville Predators	20–26–6–2	48	L
55	February 12	San Jose Sharks	0–1	Columbus Blue Jackets	21–26–6–2	50	W
56	February 13	Columbus Blue Jackets	2–1	Montreal Canadiens	22–26–6–2	52	W
57	February 15	Chicago Blackhawks	7–1	Columbus Blue Jackets	22–27–6–2	52	L
58	February 18	Columbus Blue Jackets	2–5	Phoenix Coyotes	22–28–6–2	52	L
59	February 19	Columbus Blue Jackets	0–2	Mighty Ducks of Anaheim	22–29–6–2	52	L
60	February 21	Columbus Blue Jackets	0–6	San Jose Sharks	22–30–6–2	52	L
61	February 23	Columbus Blue Jackets	2–7	Vancouver Canucks	22–31–6–2	52	L
62	February 25	Columbus Blue Jackets	0–5	Nashville Predators	22–32–6–2	52	L
63	February 27	Los Angeles Kings	1–3	Columbus Blue Jackets	23–32–6–2	54	W

March: 5–8–1–1 (home: 3–4–1–1; road: 2–4–0–0)

Game	Date	Visitor	Score	Home	Record	Pts	Recap
64	March 1	Edmonton Oilers	3–3	Columbus Blue Jackets	23–32–7–2	55	T
65	March 3	Detroit Red Wings	3–2	Columbus Blue Jackets	23–33–7–2	55	L
66	March 6	Vancouver Canucks	4–5	Columbus Blue Jackets	24–33–7–2	57	W
67	March 8	Calgary Flames	3–2	Columbus Blue Jackets	24–33–7–3	58	OTL
68	March 10	Columbus Blue Jackets	5–6	Carolina Hurricanes	24–34–7–3	58	L
69	March 11	Dallas Stars	2–0	Columbus Blue Jackets	24–35–7–3	58	L
70	March 13	Colorado Avalanche	5–1	Columbus Blue Jackets	24–36–7–3	58	L
71	March 15	Minnesota Wild	0–5	Columbus Blue Jackets	25–36–7–3	60	W
72	March 17	Columbus Blue Jackets	2–3	Atlanta Thrashers	25–37–7–3	60	L
73	March 20	Toronto Maple Leafs	3–4	Columbus Blue Jackets	26–37–7–3	62	W
74	March 22	Atlanta Thrashers	3–2	Columbus Blue Jackets	26–38–7–3	62	L
75	March 24	Columbus Blue Jackets	0–5	Mighty Ducks of Anaheim	26–39–7–3	62	L
76	March 25	Columbus Blue Jackets	2–1	Los Angeles Kings	27–39–7–3	64	W
77	March 28	Columbus Blue Jackets	0–4	Edmonton Oilers	27–40–7–3	64	L
78	March 29	Columbus Blue Jackets	6–4	Calgary Flames	28–40–7–3	66	W

April: 1–2–1–0 (home: 1–0–1–0; road: 0–2–0–0)

Game	Date	Visitor	Score	Home	Record	Pts	Recap
79	April 1	Columbus Blue Jackets	0–4	Philadelphia Flyers	28–41–7–3	66	L
80	April 2	Minnesota Wild	0–3	Columbus Blue Jackets	29–41–7–3	68	W
81	April 4	Detroit Red Wings	5–5	Columbus Blue Jackets	29–41–8–3	69	T
82	April 6	Columbus Blue Jackets	3–4	Minnesota Wild	29–42–8–3	69	L

Legend: W Win (2 points) L Loss (0 points) T Tie (1 point) OTL Overtime loss (1 point)

== Player statistics ==
=== Scoring ===
- Position abbreviations: C = Center; D = Defense; G = Goaltender; LW = Left wing; RW = Right wing
- † = Joined team via a transaction (e.g., trade, waivers, signing) during the season. Stats reflect time with the Blue Jackets only.
- ‡ = Left team via a transaction (e.g., trade, waivers, release) during the season. Stats reflect time with the Blue Jackets only.

No.	Player	Pos	Regular season					
No.	Player	Pos	GP	G	A	Pts	+/-	PIM
14	Ray Whitney	LW	81	24	52	76	−26	22
25	Andrew Cassels	C	79	20	48	68	−4	30
8	Geoff Sanderson	LW	82	34	33	67	−4	34
9	David Vyborny	RW	79	20	26	46	12	16
3	Jaroslav Spacek	D	81	9	36	45	−23	70
16	Mike Sillinger	C	75	18	25	43	−21	52
61	Rick Nash	LW	74	17	22	39	−27	78
28	Tyler Wright	C	70	19	11	30	−25	113
29	Grant Marshall‡	RW	66	8	20	28	−8	71
20	Lasse Pirjeta	C	51	11	10	21	−4	12
23	Derrick Walser	D	53	4	13	17	−9	34
44	Rostislav Klesla	D	72	2	14	16	−22	71
19	Sean Pronger	C	78	7	6	13	−26	72
22	Luke Richardson	D	82	0	13	13	−16	73
21	Espen Knutsen	C	31	5	4	9	−15	20
41	Matt Davidson	RW	34	4	5	9	−12	18
24	Hannes Hyvonen‡	RW	36	4	5	9	−11	22
42	Duvie Westcott	D	39	0	7	7	−3	77
43	David Ling	RW	35	3	2	5	−6	86
45	Jody Shelley	LW	68	1	4	5	−5	249
17	Tomi Kallio†‡	LW	12	1	2	3	−7	8
27	Darren Van Impe†	D	14	1	1	2	−6	10
34	Jean-Luc Grand-Pierre	D	41	1	0	1	−6	64
33	Jamie Allison	D	48	0	1	1	−15	99
7	Scott Lachance	D	61	0	1	1	−20	46
26	Andrej Nedorost	LW	12	0	1	1	−6	4
38	Blake Bellefeuille	C	3	0	0	0	0	0
12	Mathieu Darche	LW	1	0	0	0	−1	0
30	Marc Denis	G	77	0	0	0		6
11	Kevin Dineen‡	RW	4	0	0	0	0	12
35	Jean-Francois Labbe	G	11	0	0	0		2
17	Paul Manning	D	8	0	0	0	0	2
15	Kent McDonell	RW	3	0	0	0	−1	0
37	Darrel Scoville	D	2	0	0	0	0	4

=== Goaltending ===
No.	Player	Regular season									
No.	Player	GP	W	L	T	SA	GA	GAA	SV%	SO	TOI
30	Marc Denis	77	27	41	8	2404	232	3.09	.903	5	4511
35	Jean-Francois Labbe	11	2	4	0	233	27	3.59	.884	0	451

== Awards and records ==
=== Awards ===
Type	Award/honor	Recipient	Ref
League (annual)	NHL All-Rookie Team	Rick Nash (Forward)	
League (in-season)	NHL All-Star Game selection	Ray Whitney	
League (in-season)	NHL Rookie of the Month	Rick Nash (November)	
League (in-season)	NHL YoungStars Game selection	Rostislav Klesla	
League (in-season)	NHL YoungStars Game selection	Rick Nash	
Team	Foundation Community Service Award	Tyler Wright	
Team	Three Stars Award	Marc Denis	

=== Records ===
Goaltender Marc Denis set the NHL record for most minutes played in a single season, surpassing Martin Brodeur’s mark set during the 1995–96 season. Brodeur would reclaim the record in 2003–04.

=== Milestones ===
Milestone	Player	Date	Ref
First game	Rick Nash	October 10, 2002	
First game	Lasse Pirjeta	October 10, 2002	
First game	Paul Manning	January 4, 2003	
First game	Kent McDonell	April 2, 2003	

== Transactions ==
The Blue Jackets were involved in the following transactions from June 14, 2002, the day after the deciding game of the 2002 Stanley Cup Finals, through June 9, 2003, the day of the deciding game of the 2003 Stanley Cup Finals.

=== Trades ===
Date	Details		Ref
June 18, 2002	To Columbus Blue Jackets: 1st-round pick in 2002	To Dallas Stars: Ron Tugnutt; 2nd-round pick in 2002	
June 22, 2002	To Columbus Blue Jackets: 1st-round pick in 2002	To Florida Panthers: 1st-round pick in 2002; Option to switch 1st-round picks in 2003	
June 22, 2002	To Columbus Blue Jackets: Rights to Mike Pandolfo; Detroit’s 1st-round pick in 2002	To Buffalo Sabres: Dallas’ 1st-round pick in 2002	
June 22, 2002	To Columbus Blue Jackets: Buffalo’s 2nd-round pick in 2002; Detroit’s 3rd-round pick in 2002	To Atlanta Thrashers: Detroit’s 1st-round pick in 2002	
June 22, 2002	To Columbus Blue Jackets: 4th-round pick in 2002	To New York Islanders: Mattias Timander	
June 23, 2002	To Columbus Blue Jackets: Vancouver’s 6th-round pick in 2002; 7th-round pick in 2002	To Philadelphia Flyers: 5th-round pick in 2003	
June 23, 2002	To Columbus Blue Jackets: 9th-round pick in 2002	To Florida Panthers: 9th-round pick in 2003	
October 4, 2002	To Columbus Blue Jackets: Rights to Petr Tenkrat	To Florida Panthers: Mathieu Biron	
December 2, 2002	To Columbus Blue Jackets: Tomi Kallio; Pauli Levokari	To Atlanta Thrashers: Chris Nielsen; Rights to Petteri Nummelin	
March 10, 2003	To Columbus Blue Jackets: Conditional draft pick in 2004	To New Jersey Devils: Grant Marshall	

=== Players acquired ===
Date	Player	Former team	Term	Via	Ref
July 4, 2002	Scott Lachance	Vancouver Canucks	multi-year	Free agency	
July 4, 2002	Luke Richardson	Philadelphia Flyers	multi-year	Free agency	
July 17, 2002	Donald MacLean	Toronto Maple Leafs	1-year (Note: Club option for a second year.)	Free agency	
August 15, 2002	Andrew Cassels	Vancouver Canucks	multi-year	Free agency	
October 4, 2002	Mathieu Biron	Tampa Bay Lightning		Waiver draft	
October 5, 2002	Hannes Hyvonen	Florida Panthers		Waivers	
January 20, 2003	Darren Van Impe	Syracuse Crunch (AHL)		Free agency	
May 15, 2003	Joe Motzko	Syracuse Crunch (AHL)	multi-year	Free agency	
June 2, 2003	Fred Brathwaite	St. Louis Blues	1-year	Free agency	

=== Players lost ===
Date	Player	New team	Via (Note: In parentheses is the player's free agency group on July 1 if applicable.)	Ref
July 4, 2002	Brett Harkins	Skelleftea AIK (Allsvenskan)	Free agency (UFA)	
July 4, 2002	Robert Kron	Lukko (Liiga) (Note: Kron signed with Lukko on December 30.)	Buyout	
July 20, 2002	Andrei Sryubko	Molot-Prikamye Perm (RSL)	Free agency (UFA)	
July 26, 2002	Martin Spanhel	HC Sparta Praha (ELH)	Free agency (II) (Note: Columbus retained Spanhel’s NHL rights through the 2006–07 season.)	
August 27, 2002	Serge Aubin	Colorado Avalanche	Free agency (UFA)	
October 5, 2002	Greg Gardner	Mississippi Sea Wolves (ECHL)	Free agency (UFA)	
October 16, 2002	Deron Quint	Springfield Falcons (AHL)	Free agency (UFA)	
November 5, 2002	Kevin Dineen		Retirement	
January 1, 2003	Tomi Kallio	Philadelphia Flyers	Waivers	
January 25, 2003	Hannes Hyvonen	Farjestad BK (SHL)	Free agency (Note: Columbus retained Hyvonen’s NHL rights through the 2005–06 season.)	

=== Signings ===
Date	Player	Term	Contract type	Ref
June 26, 2002	Grant Marshall	multi-year	Re-signing	
June 26, 2002	Lasse Pirjeta	1-year	Entry-level	
June 27, 2002	Marc Denis	multi-year	Re-signing	
July 2, 2002	Tim Jackman	multi-year	Entry-level	
July 8, 2002	Jamie Allison	1-year	Re-signing	
July 8, 2002	Mike Pandolfo	multi-year	Entry-level	
July 29, 2002	Jean-Luc Grand-Pierre	multi-year	Re-signing	
July 29, 2002	Espen Knutsen	multi-year	Re-signing	
July 29, 2002	Geoff Sanderson	1-year	Re-signing	
August 21, 2002	David Ling	1-year	Re-signing	
August 21, 2002	Matt Davidson	1-year	Re-signing	
August 28, 2002	Blake Bellefeuille	1-year	Re-signing	
August 28, 2002	Derrick Walser	1-year	Re-signing	
September 7, 2002	Kevin Dineen	1-year	Re-signing	
September 24, 2002	Mathieu Darche		Re-signing	
October 7, 2002	Rick Nash	3-year	Entry-level	
May 7, 2003	Geoff Sanderson	multi-year	Extension	
May 7, 2003	David Vyborny	1-year	Extension	
May 15, 2003	Duvie Westcott	multi-year	Extension	
June 3, 2003	Aaron Johnson	multi-year	Entry-level	

== Draft picks ==
Columbus' draft picks at the 2002 NHL entry draft at the Air Canada Centre in Toronto, Ontario.

Round	#	Player	Nationality	College/junior/club team (league)
1	1	Rick Nash	Canada	London Knights (OHL)
2	41	Joakim Lindstrom	Sweden	Modo Hockey (Sweden)
3	65	Ole-Kristian Tollefsen	Norway	Lillehammer IK (Norway)
3	96	Jeff Genovy	United States	Des Moines Buccaneers (USHL)
4	98	Ivan Tkachenko	Russia	Lokomotiv Yaroslavl (Russia)
4	119	Jekabs Redlihs	Latvia	New York Applecore (EJHL)
5	133	Lasse Pirjeta	Finland	Karpat (Finland)
6	168	Tim Konsorada	Canada	Brandon Wheat Kings (WHL)
6	184	Jaroslav Balastik	Czech Republic	Continental Zlin (Czech Republic)
7	199	Greg Mauldin	United States	University of Massachusetts Amherst (Hockey East)
7	225	Steve Goertzen	Canada	Seattle Thunderbirds (WHL)
8	231	Jaroslav Kracik	Czech Republic	HC Plzen (Czech Republic)
9	263	Sergei Mozyakin	Russia	CSKA Moscow (Russia)
