= Mark Rycroft =

Canadian ice hockey player (born 1978)

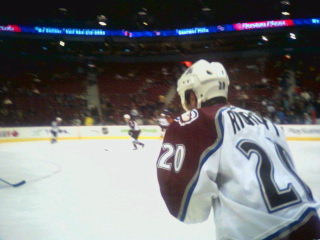
- Born: July 12, 1978 (age 47) Penticton, British Columbia, Canada
- Height: 5 ft 11 in (180 cm)
- Weight: 194 lb (88 kg; 13 st 12 lb)
- Position: Right wing
- Shot: Right
- Played for: St. Louis Blues; Colorado Avalanche
- NHL draft: Undrafted
- Playing career: 2000–2008

Mark A. Rycroft (born July 12, 1978) is a Canadian former professional ice hockey right winger who played in the National Hockey League (NHL) for the St. Louis Blues and Colorado Avalanche. Rycroft is currently a color commentator for Altitude Sports and Entertainment, the local affiliate of the Colorado Avalanche.

== Playing career ==
Prior to playing professional hockey, Rycroft played two seasons with Nanaimo Clippers in the British Columbia Hockey League (BCHL) and three collegiate seasons at the University of Denver. Having gone undrafted in any NHL entry draft, on May 15, 2000, Rycroft signed an NHL contract with the St. Louis Blues as a free agent. In the 2001–02 season, he made his NHL debut with the Blues.

During the 2004–05 NHL lockout, Rycroft played for the Diables Rouges de Briançon in the Ligue Magnus. On July 12, 2006, he was signed as a free agent by the Colorado Avalanche to a two-year contract. After playing the 2006–07 season with the Avalanche, Rycroft was assigned to the club's American Hockey League (AHL) affiliate, the Lake Erie Monsters, to start the 2007–08 season.

On January 22, 2008, Rycroft was traded to the Columbus Blue Jackets in exchange for Darcy Campbell and Philippe Dupuis. He was immediately assigned to the Blue Jackets' AHL affiliate, Syracuse Crunch, and ultimately never played a game for Columbus. On July 17, 2008, Rycroft signed with Dinamo Minsk of the newly-formed Kontinental Hockey League (KHL), but was later released without having played a game for the team.

Rycroft is currently a TV color commentator for Altitude Sports and Entertainment, the local affiliate of the Colorado Avalanche.

== Career statistics ==
			Regular season					Playoffs
Season	Team	League	GP	G	A	Pts	PIM	GP	G	A	Pts	PIM
1995–96	Nanaimo Clippers	BCHL	60	17	28	45	28	—	—	—	—	—
1996–97	Nanaimo Clippers	BCHL	58	32	35	67	79	—	—	—	—	—
1997–98	University of Denver	WCHA	35	15	17	32	28	—	—	—	—	—
1998–99	University of Denver	WCHA	41	19	18	37	36	—	—	—	—	—
1999–00	University of Denver	WCHA	41	17	17	34	87	—	—	—	—	—
2000–01	Worcester IceCats	AHL	71	24	26	50	68	11	2	5	7	4
2001–02	Worcester IceCats	AHL	66	12	19	31	68	3	0	1	1	0
2001–02	St. Louis Blues	NHL	9	0	3	3	4	—	—	—	—	—
2002–03	Worcester IceCats	AHL	45	8	18	26	35	1	0	0	0	0
2003–04	St. Louis Blues	NHL	71	9	12	21	32	3	0	0	0	2
2004–05	Diables Rouges de Briançon	FRA	13	8	8	16	18	4	2	1	3	0
2005–06	St. Louis Blues	NHL	80	6	4	10	46	—	—	—	—	—
2006–07	Colorado Avalanche	NHL	66	6	6	12	31	—	—	—	—	—
2007–08	Lake Erie Monsters	AHL	30	1	6	7	17	—	—	—	—	—
2007–08	Syracuse Crunch	AHL	34	3	10	13	10	13	2	2	4	4
NHL totals			226	21	25	46	113	3	0	0	0	2

== Awards and honours ==
Award	Year
College
WCHA All-Rookie Team	1998
