= 2001 National Hockey League All-Star Game =

Professional ice hockey exhibition game

2001 NHL All-Star Game
	1	2	3	Total
World	3	4	5	12
North America	3	6	5	14
- Date: February 4, 2001
- Arena: Pepsi Center
- City: Denver
- MVP: Bill Guerin (Boston)
- Attendance: 18,646

The 2001 National Hockey League All-Star Game took place on February 4, 2001, at Pepsi Center in Denver, home to the Colorado Avalanche. The final score was North America 14, World 12.

== Super Skills Competition ==
The North America All-Stars won their first-ever skills competition since the North America–World All-Star format was in place. Colorado Avalanche's Joe Sakic, Vancouver Canucks' Ed Jovanovski and Philadelphia Flyers' Simon Gagne teamed to win the puck control relay, while the Mighty Ducks of Anaheim's Paul Kariya would win his third-straight individual Puck Control Relay event. Colorado Avalanche Ray Bourque won the Shooting Accuracy event again. Bourque has won the event for the eighth time. Tampa Bay Lightning's Fredrik Modin won the Hardest-Shot title. His shot was clocked at 102.1 miles per hour. Boston Bruins' Bill Guerin won the Fastest Skater event with a time 13.69 seconds. Joe Sakic, Bill Guerin, and Los Angeles Kings' Luc Robitaille pot three goals in the inaugural pass and score competition. Buffalo Sabres' Dominik Hasek faces breakaways from Dallas Stars' Brett Hull, Ray Bourque and Pittsburgh Penguins' Mario Lemieux in the breakaway relay.

=== Individual event winners ===
- Puck Control Relay – Paul Kariya (Mighty Ducks of Anaheim)
- Fastest Skater – Bill Guerin (Boston Bruins) – 13.690 seconds
- Accuracy Shooting – Ray Bourque (Colorado Avalanche) – 4 hits, 6 shots
- Hardest Shot – Fredrik Modin (Tampa Bay Lightning) – 102.1 mph
- Goaltenders Competition – Sean Burke (Phoenix Coyotes) – 4 GA, 13 shots

== Highlights ==
The 2000–01 season was highlighted by the return of Mario Lemieux. After 3 1/2 years in retirement, Lemieux returned to NHL action and with it came a selection to his ninth NHL All-Star Game. Notching a goal and an assist for the North America All-Stars, Lemieux's All-Star totals climbed to 12 goals and 10 assists for 22 points. He trails only Wayne Gretzky for the All-Star Game's all-time leading scoring title (13–12–25).

Bill Guerin, Tony Amonte and Doug Weight played as an all-American line, combining for 13 points (six goals and seven assists). In his All-Star Game debut, Guerin recorded a hat-trick and added two assists, capturing MVP honors. The North America All-Stars defeated the World All-Stars 14–12, setting a new All-Star Game record for most goals scored by both teams in one game (26).

== Boxscore ==
	North America	World
Final score	14	12
Head coach	(Canada) Joel Quenneville (St. Louis Blues)	(Canada) Jacques Martin (Ottawa Senators)
Assistant coach	(Canada) Bob Hartley (Colorado Avalanche)	(Canada) Larry Robinson (New Jersey Devils)
Lineup	Starting lineup: 3 – (Canada) D Rob Blake (Los Angeles Kings); 9 – (Canada) LW Paul Kariya (Mighty Ducks of Anaheim); 14 – (Canada) RW Theoren Fleury (New York Rangers); 19 – (Canada) C Joe Sakic (Colorado Avalanche); 33 – (Canada) G Patrick Roy (Colorado Avalanche); 77 – (Canada) D Ray Bourque (Colorado Avalanche); Reserves: 1 – (Canada) G Sean Burke (Phoenix Coyotes); 4 – (Canada) D Scott Stevens (New Jersey Devils); 5 – (United States) D Brian Leetch (New York Rangers); 10 – (United States) RW Tony Amonte (Chicago Blackhawks); 12 – (Canada) C Simon Gagne (Philadelphia Flyers); 13 – (United States) RW Bill Guerin (Boston Bruins); 16 – (United States) RW Brett Hull (Dallas Stars); 20 – (Canada) LW Luc Robitaille (Los Angeles Kings); 27 – (Canada) D Scott Niedermayer (New Jersey Devils); 28 – (Canada) RW Donald Audette (Atlanta Thrashers); 30 – (Canada) G Martin Brodeur (New Jersey Devils); 39 – (United States) C Doug Weight (Edmonton Oilers); 41 – (Canada) C Jason Allison (Boston Bruins); 55 – (Canada) D Ed Jovanovski (Vancouver Canucks); 66 – (Canada) C Mario Lemieux (Pittsburgh Penguins) – (C)	Starting lineup: 5 – (Sweden) D Nicklas Lidstrom (Detroit Red Wings); 8 – (Latvia) D Sandis Ozolinsh (Carolina Hurricanes); 10 – (Russia) LW Pavel Bure (Florida Panthers); 21 – (Sweden) C Peter Forsberg (Colorado Avalanche) – (C); 23 – (Czech Republic) RW Milan Hejduk (Colorado Avalanche); 39 – (Czech Republic) G Dominik Hasek (Buffalo Sabres); Reserves: 11 – (Sweden) D Marcus Ragnarsson (San Jose Sharks); 13 – (Sweden) C Mats Sundin (Toronto Maple Leafs); 14 – (Czech Republic) C Radek Bonk (Ottawa Senators); 15 – (Russia) LW Sergei Samsonov (Boston Bruins); 18 – (Slovakia) RW Marian Hossa (Ottawa Senators); 19 – (Sweden) LW Markus Naslund (Vancouver Canucks); 27 – (Finland) D Teppo Numminen (Phoenix Coyotes); 32 – (Czech Republic) G Roman Cechmanek (Philadelphia Flyers); 33 – (Slovakia) RW Zigmund Palffy (Los Angeles Kings); 34 – (Sweden) LW Fredrik Modin (Tampa Bay Lightning); 35 – (Russia) G Evgeni Nabokov (San Jose Sharks); 44 – (Finland) D Janne Niinimaa (Edmonton Oilers); 55 – (Russia) D Sergei Gonchar (Washington Capitals); 72 – (Russia) RW Alexei Kovalev (Pittsburgh Penguins); 91 – (Russia) C Sergei Fedorov (Detroit Red Wings)
Scoring summary	Fleury (Kariya, Stevens) 0:49 1st; Guerin (Weight) 11:22 1st; Robitaille (Allison, Blake) 12:00 1st; Amonte (Weight) 3:25 2nd; Lemieux (Stevens) 4:53 2nd; Sakic (Kariya, Fleury) 6:59 2nd; Amonte (2) (Guerin, Leetch) 8:36 2nd; Guerin (2) (Amonte) 14:36 2nd; Robitaille (2) (Audette) 18:13 2nd; Weight (Amonte, Guerin) 2:56 3rd; Gagne (Hull, Lemieux) 5:16 3rd; Fleury (2) (Kariya) 12:03 3rd; Gagne (2) (unassisted) 17:07 3rd (GWG); Guerin (3) (Jovanovski, Weight) 17:58 3rd	Sundin (Modin, Lidstrom) 8:01 1st; Sundin (2) (Modin, Numminen) 17:05 1st; Forsberg (Samsonov) 17:26 1st; Naslund (Gonchar, Hossa) 2:40 2nd; Samsonov (Forsberg, Lidstrom) 8:08 2nd; Palffy (Modin, Sundin) 17:01 2nd; Fedorov (Bure, Kovalev) 19:35 2nd; Hejduk (Ozolinsh, Forsberg) 1:05 3rd; Bonk (Naslund, Hossa) 5:50 3rd; Fedorov (2) (Bure, Numminen) 8:55 3rd; Kovalev (Sundin, Gonchar) 13:57 3rd; Lidstrom (Palffy, Modin) 19:59 3rd
Penalties	none	none
Shots on goal	17–20–16–53	11–11–23–45
Win/loss	W – Martin Brodeur	L – Evgeni Nabokov

- Referees: Mick McGeough, Richard Trottier
- Linesmen: Randy Mitton, Mark Wheler
- Television: ABC, CBC, SRC

== See also ==
- 2000–01 NHL season

== Notes ==
- ^1 Sean Burke won in a penalty shot tie-breaker with Evgeni Nabokov, both goaltenders posted two-goals against in the Breakaway Relay and the Pass and Score Events.
- ^2 Chris Pronger was voted as a starter, but was not able to play due to injury. Ed Jovanovski was selected as his replacement, while Rob Blake was named as his replacement in the starting lineup. Blake was still a member of the Kings at the time of the All-Star Game; he was traded to the Colorado Avalanche several weeks later on February 21, 2001.
- ^3 Vincent Damphousse was selected, but was unable to play due to injury. Simon Gagne was named as his replacement.
- ^4 Al MacInnis was selected, but was unable to play due to injury. Scott Niedermayer was named as his replacement.
- ^5 Jaromir Jagr was voted as a starter, but was not able to play due to injury. Milan Hejduk was named as his replacement.
- ^6 Alexander Mogilny was selected, but was unable to play due to injury. Sergei Samsonov was named as his replacement.
