= Philippe Dupuis =

Canadian ice hockey player (born 1985)

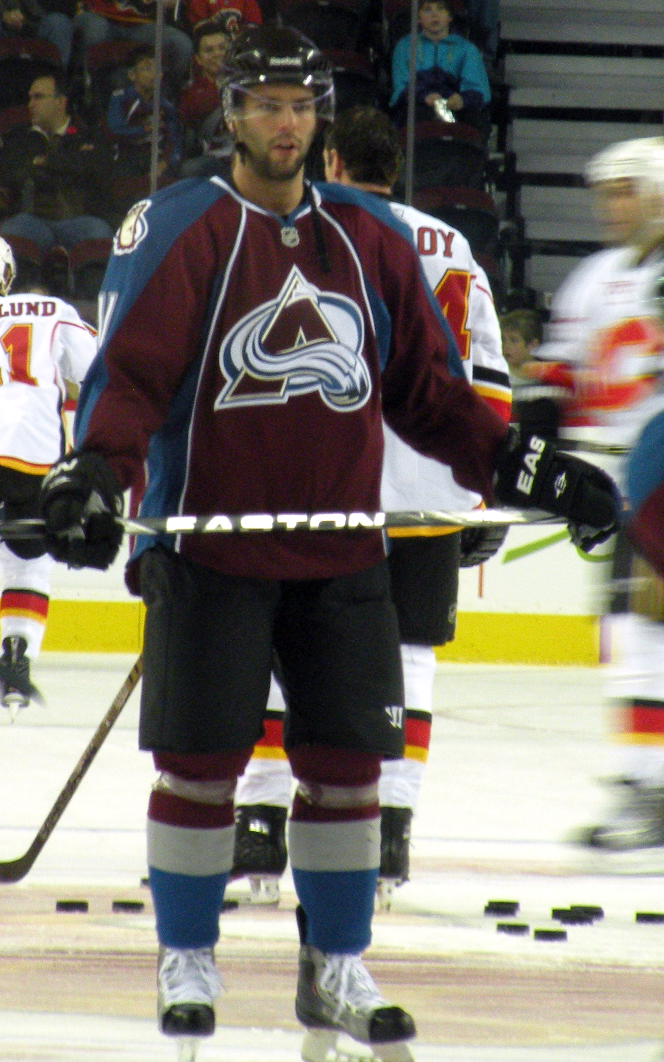
- Dupuis with the Colorado Avalanche in 2010
- Born: April 24, 1985 (age 41) Laval, Quebec, Canada
- Height: 6 ft 0 in (183 cm)
- Weight: 196 lb (89 kg; 14 st 0 lb)
- Position: Centre
- Shot: Right
- Played for: Colorado Avalanche; Toronto Maple Leafs; Hamburg Freezers; Thomas Sabo Ice Tigers
- NHL draft: 104th overall, 2003; Columbus Blue Jackets
- Playing career: 2006–2020

Philippe Dupuis (French pronunciation: [filip dypɥi]; born April 24, 1985) is a Canadian former professional ice hockey player who played in the National Hockey League (NHL) with the Colorado Avalanche and the Toronto Maple Leafs.

== Playing career ==
Dupuis was drafted 104th overall in the 2003 NHL entry draft by the Columbus Blue Jackets from Hull Olympiques of the QMJHL. On July 28, 2005, Dupuis signed a 3-year entry-level contract with the Blue Jackets. After 5 years in the QMJHL, Dupuis made his professional debut in the 2006–07 season with the Syracuse Crunch of the AHL.

During the 2007–08 season on January 22, 2008, Dupuis was traded from the Blue Jackets, along with Darcy Campbell, to the Colorado Avalanche for Mark Rycroft. Dupuis was then sent to AHL affiliate, the Lake Erie Monsters, for the remainder of the year.

Dupuis received his first recall to the Avalanche in the 2008–09 season on December 11, 2008. He made his NHL debut in a 4-3 loss against the Chicago Blackhawks on December 13, 2008. In the 2009–10 season Dupuis was again assigned to Lake Erie posting 35 points in 68 contests. Philippe played in four games with the Avalanche and notched his first NHL point, an assist, in a 4-1 victory over the Phoenix Coyotes on November 4, 2009.

In the 2010–11 season, Dupuis made the Avalanche's opening night roster out of training camp, securing a position as the team's fourth line center. He scored his first NHL goal, which was short handed, on November 6, 2010, against Andrew Raycroft of the Dallas Stars, as part of a 5-0 home win for the Colorado Avalanche. He also had two assists and was named the first star of the game. Dupuis concluded his NHL rookie campaign with 17 points in 74 games.

On July 7, 2011, the Toronto Maple Leafs signed Dupuis to a two-way one-year deal. He made the Maple Leafs opening night roster for the 2011–12 season as the team's fourth line center. Whilst playing in limited minutes, Dupuis struggled offensively and after 30 scoreless games was waived by the Maple Leafs on January 2, 2012. Upon clearing, he was assigned to AHL affiliate, the Toronto Marlies for the remainder of the season. Dupuis regained his scoring touch with the Marlies to help reach the Calder Cup finals with 14 points in 17 playoff games.

On July 5, 2012, Dupuis was signed as a free agent to a one-year, two-way deal with the Pittsburgh Penguins. Due to the NHL lockout, Dupuis was directly assigned to AHL affiliate, the Wilkes-Barre/Scranton Penguins, for the 2012–13 season. Dupuis had his season blighted by a concussion which limited his effectiveness in producing 11 points in 34 games.

Dupuis signed his first professional European contract on a one-year deal with German club, the Hamburg Freezers of the DEL on June 27, 2013. In April 2014, he had his contract renewed for two years.

In the 2015–16 season, Dupuis was Hamburg's leading scorer with 17 goals and 18 assists in 52 contests. When his contract was up, he opted moved on to his second German club, the Thomas Sabo Ice Tigers, signing on May 11, 2016.

Dupuis played four seasons with the Ice Tigers in Nürnberg, posting 18 points in 28 games before COVID-19 ended in his final professional season in 2019–20.

== Coaching career ==
On May 16, 2020, Dupuis effectively announced his retirement in accepting the Assistant Coaching position of the Quebec Midget AAA program at Collège Esther-Blondin Phénix.

== Career statistics ==
			Regular season					Playoffs
Season	Team	League	GP	G	A	Pts	PIM	GP	G	A	Pts	PIM
2001–02	Hull Olympiques	QMJHL	67	7	14	21	59	12	6	5	11	14
2002–03	Hull Olympiques	QMJHL	68	22	34	56	89	20	2	4	6	22
2003–04	Gatineau Olympiques	QMJHL	60	18	37	55	77	15	6	10	16	14
2004–05	Rouyn–Noranda Huskies	QMJHL	62	34	50	84	60	10	5	3	8	8
2005–06	Moncton Wildcats	QMJHL	56	32	76	108	52	19	14	18	32	14
2006–07	Syracuse Crunch	AHL	51	11	11	22	18	—	—	—	—	—
2006–07	Dayton Bombers	ECHL	8	3	2	5	8	19	6	9	15	28
2007–08	Syracuse Crunch	AHL	29	7	4	11	2	—	—	—	—	—
2007–08	Lake Erie Monsters	AHL	17	5	3	8	12	—	—	—	—	—
2008–09	Lake Erie Monsters	AHL	67	17	29	46	42	—	—	—	—	—
2008–09	Colorado Avalanche	NHL	8	0	0	0	4	—	—	—	—	—
2009–10	Lake Erie Monsters	AHL	68	16	19	35	47	—	—	—	—	—
2009–10	Colorado Avalanche	NHL	4	0	1	1	2	—	—	—	—	—
2010–11	Colorado Avalanche	NHL	74	6	11	17	40	—	—	—	—	—
2011–12	Toronto Maple Leafs	NHL	30	0	0	0	16	—	—	—	—	—
2011–12	Toronto Marlies	AHL	42	15	16	31	8	17	4	10	14	20
2012–13	Wilkes–Barre/Scranton Penguins	AHL	34	2	9	11	14	—	—	—	—	—
2013–14	Hamburg Freezers	DEL	50	13	22	35	32	10	2	3	5	0
2014–15	Hamburg Freezers	DEL	28	7	17	24	18	—	—	—	—	—
2015–16	Hamburg Freezers	DEL	52	17	18	35	46	—	—	—	—	—
2016–17	Thomas Sabo Ice Tigers	DEL	52	10	26	36	38	13	4	5	9	20
2017–18	Thomas Sabo Ice Tigers	DEL	52	14	24	38	18	11	1	6	7	6
2018–19	Thomas Sabo Ice Tigers	DEL	50	12	24	36	36	8	0	3	3	12
2019–20	Thomas Sabo Ice Tigers	DEL	28	2	16	18	20	—	—	—	—	—
NHL totals			116	6	12	18	62	—	—	—	—	—
DEL totals			312	75	147	222	208	42	7	17	24	38
