= Randy Mitton =

Canadian ice hockey official

- Born: September 22, 1950 (age 75) Fredericton, New Brunswick, Canada
- Position: Linesman
- Playing career: 1972–2004

Randy Mitton (born September 22, 1950) is a Canadian retired National Hockey League linesman. His career started in 1972 and ended in 2004. During his career, Mitton officiated in one Stanley Cup Final series, 2,109 regular season games, 156 playoff games, the 1987 Canada Cup, and two All-Star games.
