= Fredrik Norrena =

Finnish ice hockey player

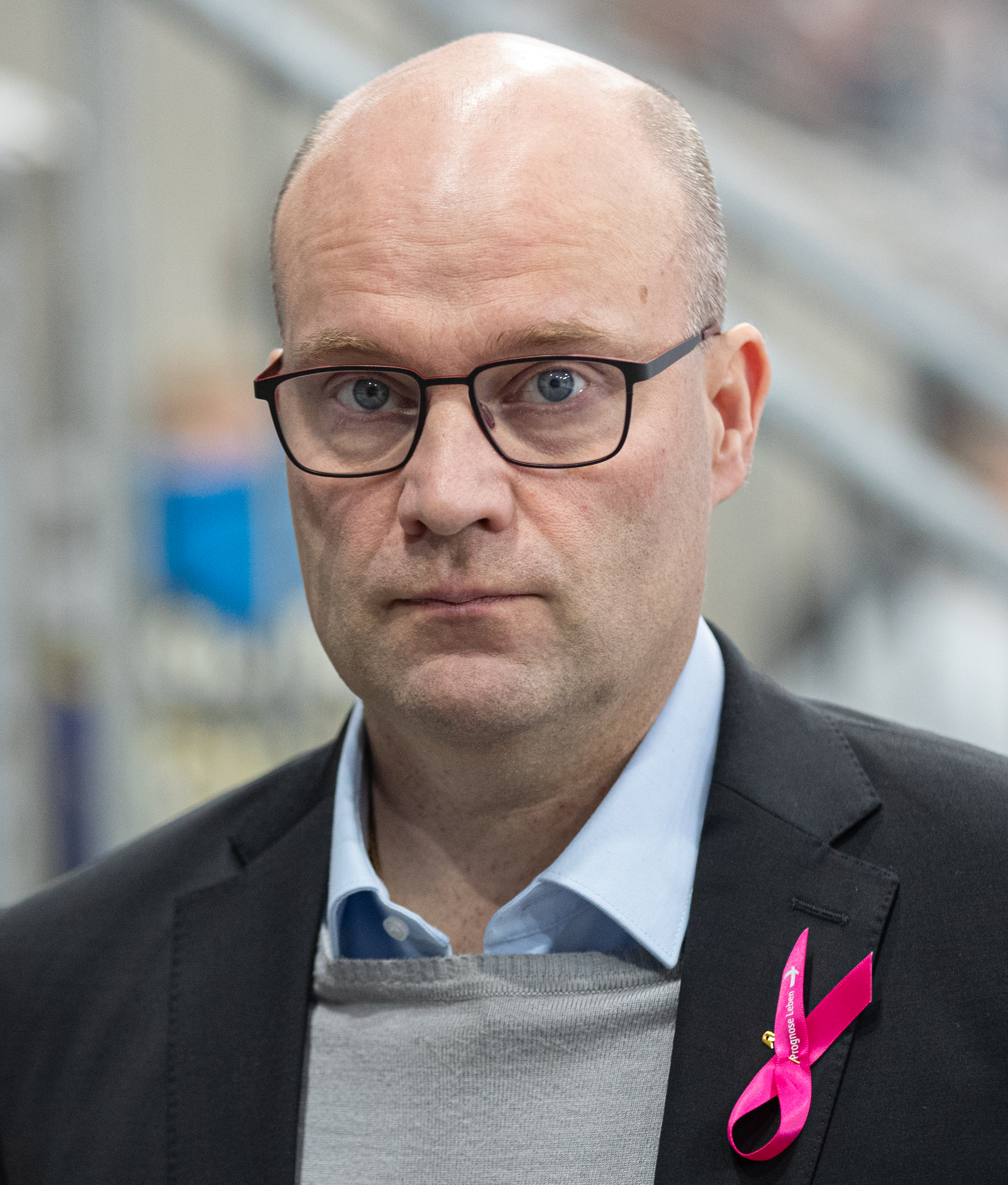
- Norrena in 2025
- Born: November 29, 1973 (age 52) Jakobstad, Finland
- Height: 6 ft 0 in (183 cm)
- Weight: 187 lb (85 kg; 13 st 5 lb)
- Position: Goaltender
- Caught: Left
- Played for: TPS; AIK; Lukko; Frölunda; Linköping; Columbus Blue Jackets
- National team: Finland
- NHL draft: 213th overall, 2002; Tampa Bay Lightning
- Playing career: 1992–2014

Fredrik Jan Elis Norrena (born November 29, 1973) is a Finnish former professional ice hockey goaltender. He played 100 games in the National Hockey League with the Columbus Blue Jackets between 2006 and 2008. The rest of his career, which lasted from 1992 to 2014, was spent in Europe where he played in the Finnish SM-liiga and Swedish Elitserien. Internationally Norrena played for the Finnish national team at five World Championships, winning one silver and one bronze medal, and the 2006 Winter Olympics, winning a silver medal.

== Playing career ==
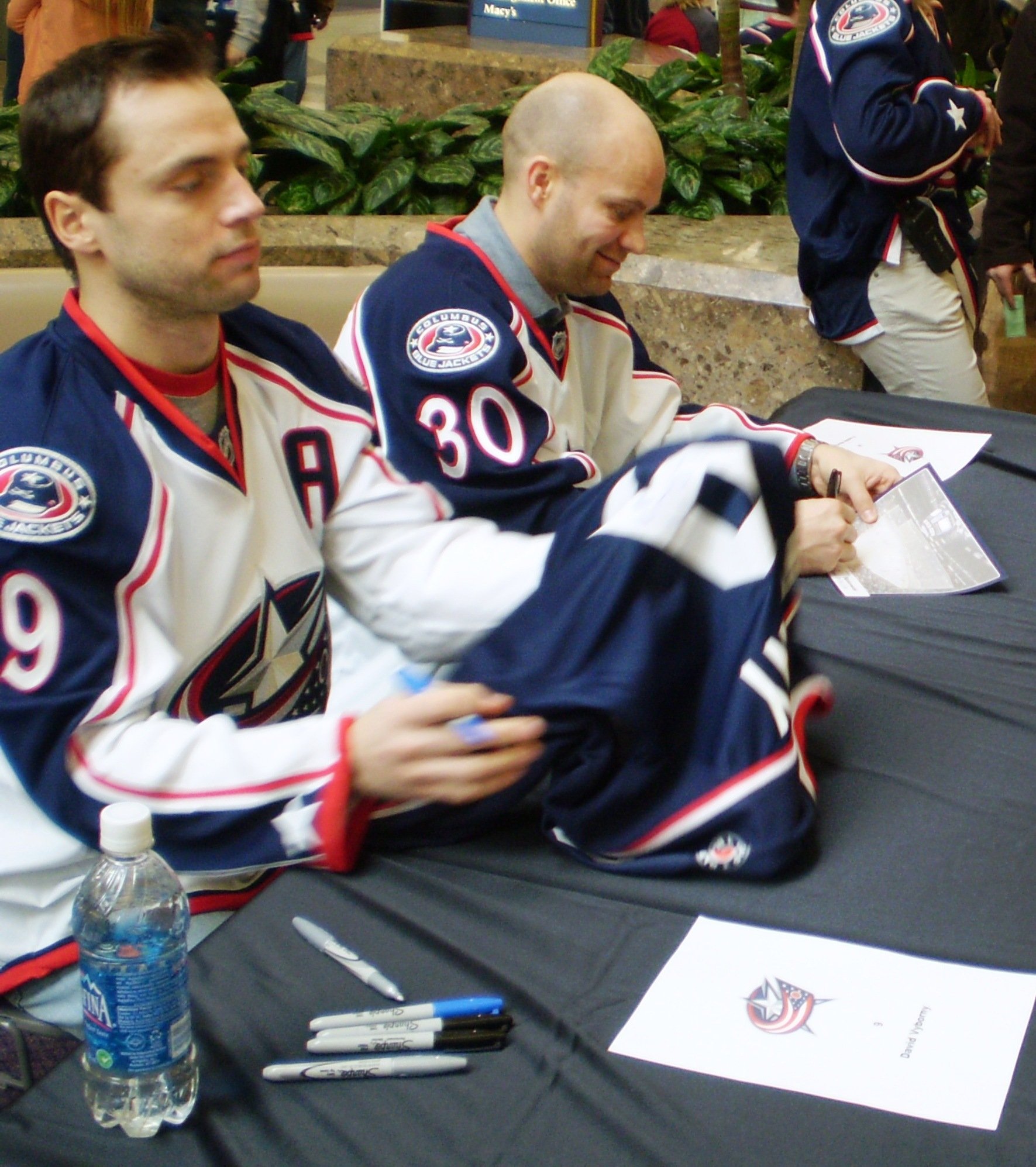
Frederick Norrena (right) with David Výborný in February 2008

Norrena started his pro hockey career with TPS in the SM-liiga, winning four Finnish championships. In 2003, he won the Swedish Championships with Frölunda HC before joining Linköpings HC in the Swedish Elitserien (SEL). He has represented Finland numerous times in international play, including as number-two goaltender in the 2006 Winter Olympics and as number-one goaltender in the 2006 World Championships.

On May 31, 2006, the Tampa Bay Lightning announced they have signed Norrena to a one-year entry-level contract. However, on June 30, he was traded to the Columbus Blue Jackets, along with Fredrik Modin, in exchange or Marc Denis. Norrena made his NHL debut on October 14 against the Minnesota Wild, stepping in to replace Pascal Leclaire in the second period. Norrena eventually took over as number-one goaltender for Blue Jackets for the 2006–07 season, playing 55 out of 82 games in his first NHL-season. Norrena also set a team record by not allowing a goal in 155 minutes and 28 seconds of play. The Blue Jackets rewarded Norrena in February 2007 with a two-year contract.

He served as the backup to Columbus' number one goaltender, Pascal Leclaire, for two seasons until 2008–09, when Steve Mason was called up from the Syracuse Crunch of the American Hockey League (AHL). On December 15, 2008, Norrena was placed on waivers. He was not picked up by another team and was sent to Columbus' AHL affiliate in Syracuse. On December 20, Norrena signed with Ak Bars Kazan of the Kontinental Hockey League (KHL) for the rest of the season. On December 30, Norrena was added to Ak Bars' roster. He won the championship of 2008–09 with Kazan. After his tenure in Russia, he signed a two-year contract with his former team Linköpings HC in Sweden, a club where he had three very successful years between 2003 and 2006.

In May 2012, Norrena signed a one-year contract with Växjö Lakers of the SEL.

In April 2013, Norrena announced his retirement. Norrena later become a goaltending coach for TPS of the Finnish top-tier league SM-liiga since.

In June 2013, TPS announced that Norrena would be their goaltender for the upcoming season and Urpo Ylönen would be their goaltending coach.

On May 12, 2014, Norrena again retired as a player.

== International ==
Medal record

Representing Finland

Olympic Games
Silver medal – second place	2006 Turin	

World Championships
Silver medal – second place	2007 Russia	
Bronze medal – third place	2006 Latvia	

- Played for Finland at the 2002 World Championships
- Played for Finland at the 2005 World Championships
- Played for Finland at the 2005 World Championships
- Played for Finland at the 2006 Winter Olympic Games (Silver Medal)
- Played for Finland at the 2006 World Championships (Bronze Medal)
- Played for Finland at the 2007 World Championships (Silver Medal)

== Career statistics ==
=== Regular season and playoffs ===
			Regular season										Playoffs
Season	Team	League	GP	W	L	T	OTL	MIN	GA	SO	GAA	SV%	GP	W	L	MIN	GA	SO	GAA	SV%
1989–90	IFK Lepplax	FIN-3	36	—	—	—	—	—	—	—	—	—	—	—	—	—	—	—	—	—
1990–91	IFK Lepplax	FIN-3	36	—	—	—	—	—	—	—	—	—	—	—	—	—	—	—	—	—
1991–92	IFK Lepplax	FIN-3	35	—	—	—	—	—	—	—	—	—	—	—	—	—	—	—	—	—
1992–93	TPS U20	FIN U20	25	15	9	1	—	1449	74	1	3.06	.906	5	—	—	307	11	1	2.14	.938
1992–93	Kiekko-67	FIN-2	—	—	—	—	—	—	—	—	—	—	—	—	—	—	—	—	—	—
1992–93	TPS	FIN	2	—	—	—	—	30	1	0	2.01	.917	—	—	—	—	—	—	—	—
1993–94	TPS U20	FIN U20	2	0	1	0	—	80	5	0	3.75	.917	1	0	1	58	4	0	4.10	.920
1993–94	TPS	FIN	10	3	3	0	—	387	19	0	2.94	.903	—	—	—	—	—	—	—	—
1993–94	Kiekko-67	FIN-2	15	7	7	1	—	884	43	2	2.92	.911	—	—	—	—	—	—	—	—
1994–95	TPS	FIN	22	14	6	2	—	1328	60	1	2.71	.903	11	7	4	666	27	1	2.43	.921
1994–95	Kiekko-67	FIN-2	15	—	—	—	—	828	34	0	2.46	.913	—	—	—	—	—	—	—	—
1995–96	TPS	FIN	26	14	8	3	—	1539	68	0	2.65	.914	—	—	—	—	—	—	—	—
1996–97	Kiekko-67	FIN-2	12	—	—	—	—	725	36	0	2.98	.906	—	—	—	—	—	—	—	—
1996–97	AIK	SWE	5	—	—	—	—	274	21	1	4.60	.811	—	—	—	—	—	—	—	—
1997–98	Lukko	FIN	37	12	19	4	—	2174	105	0	2.90	.908	—	—	—	—	—	—	—	—
1998–99	TPS	FIN	20	11	4	1	—	1010	35	2	2.08	.925	1	0	0	20	2	0	6.00	.833
1999–00	TPS	FIN	21	15	4	0	—	1175	35	2	1.79	.935	4	3	0	234	10	0	2.56	.899
1999–00	TuTo	FIN-2	2	1	1	0	—	118	7	0	3.54	.833	—	—	—	—	—	—	—	—
2000–01	TPS	FIN	39	26	10	3	—	2266	66	6	1.75	.931	10	9	1	603	13	2	1.29	.945
2001–02	TPS	FIN	32	14	11	5	—	1878	62	2	1.98	.932	4	1	3	256	7	1	1.64	.952
2002–03	Frölunda	SWE	23	—	—	—	—	1386	56	1	2.42	.907	4	—	—	288	6	1	1.25	.957
2003–04	Linköping	SWE	40	25	15	0	—	2415	68	9	1.69	.939	3	—	—	176	6	0	2.05	.908
2004–05	Linköping	SWE	43	30	11	1	—	2522	78	5	1.86	.934	6	—	—	383	13	0	2.03	.921
2005–06	Linköping	SWE	43	19	11	—	6	2170	78	4	2.16	.914	12	6	5	693	22	2	1.90	.925
2006–07	Columbus Blue Jackets	NHL	55	24	23	—	3	2952	137	3	2.78	.904	—	—	—	—	—	—	—	—
2007–08	Columbus Blue Jackets	NHL	37	10	19	—	6	1959	89	2	2.72	.896	—	—	—	—	—	—	—	—
2008–09	Columbus Blue Jackets	NHL	8	1	3	—	2	323	17	0	3.16	.872	—	—	—	—	—	—	—	—
2008–09	Ak Bars Kazan	KHL	11	6	3	—	2	669	18	1	1.61	.931	15	9	5	892	29	2	1.95	.920
2009–10	Linköping	SWE	45	23	19	—	0	2551	106	3	2.49	.907	9	4	5	561	22	1	2.35	.921
2010–11	Linköping	SWE	48	22	26	—	0	2917	103	6	2.12	.922	7	3	4	423	17	0	2.41	.920
2011–12	Linköping	SWE	47	19	23	—	0	2699	104	4	2.31	.920	—	—	—	—	—	—	—	—
2012–13	Växjö Lakers	SWE	46	19	27	—	0	2725	95	6	2.09	.919	—	—	—	—	—	—	—	—
2013–14	TPS	FIN	48	12	23	—	11	2683	129	1	2.89	.909	—	—	—	—	—	—	—	—
NHL totals			100	35	45	—	11	5,234	243	5	2.88	.891	—	—	—	—	—	—	—	—

=== International ===
Year	Team	Event	GP	W	L	T	MIN	GA	SO	GAA	SV%
2002	Finland	WC	2	1	1	0	119	4	1	2.01	.920
2004	Finland	WC	1	1	0	0	60	0	1	0.00	1.000
2005	Finland	WC	2	1	1	0	120	6	0	3.00	.882
2006	Finland	OLY	2	2	0	0	120	0	2	0.00	1.000
2006	Finland	WC	6	4	1	0	326	6	3	1.11	.951
2007	Finland	WC	3	2	1	0	180	5	2	1.67	.931
Senior totals			16	11	4	0	925	21	9	1.36	—

== Records ==
- Linköping club record for shutouts in a regular season (9), 2003–04, 50-game schedule
