= Darcy Campbell =

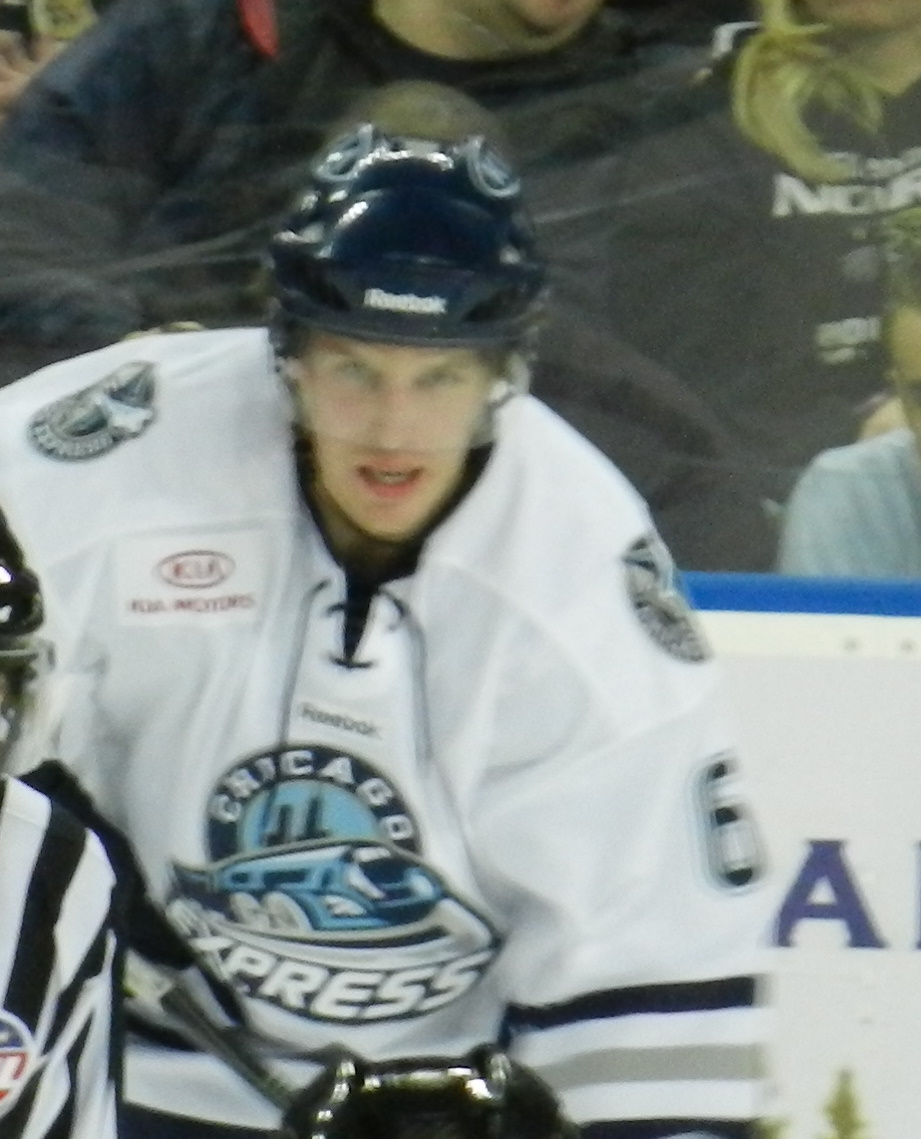
- Born: May 12, 1984 (age 42) Airdrie, Alberta, Canada
- Height: 6 ft 1 in (185 cm)
- Weight: 180 lb (82 kg; 12 st 12 lb)
- Position: Defence
- Shot: Left
- Played for: Columbus Blue Jackets; TPS; HC Slavia Praha; Eispiraten Crimmitschau; Pustertal-Val Pusteria Wolves
- NHL draft: Undrafted
- Playing career: 2007–2014

Darcy Campbell (born May 12, 1984) is a Canadian former professional ice hockey defenceman. He played in the National Hockey League (NHL) with the Columbus Blue Jackets.

== Playing career ==
Campbell played two years of junior hockey in the Alberta Junior Hockey League with the Canmore Eagles and Olds Grizzlys before moving on to the NCAA in 2004 with the University of Alaska Fairbanks. After three seasons of college hockey, Campbell turned pro, signing as a free agent with the Columbus Blue Jackets on March 19, 2007. Campbell made his NHL debut on March 30, 2007, against the Chicago Blackhawks.

After starting the 2007–08 season with the Syracuse Crunch in the AHL, Campbell was traded by the Blue Jackets with Philippe Dupuis to the Colorado Avalanche for Mark Rycroft on January 22, 2008. He was then assigned to the Avalanche's affiliate the Lake Erie Monsters.

In the 2008–09 season, Campbell spent the entire year with Lake Erie playing a career high 74 games. Campbell was recalled by the Avalanche on February 19, 2009, but didn't play a game before returning to the Monsters.

On June 10, 2009, Campbell a free agent, signed in Finland for the TPS of the SM-liiga on a one-year deal. Campbell played in 33 games with TPS in the 2009–10 season, before transferring to HC Slavia Praha of the Czech League on January 16, 2010. After posting only 1 assist in 12 games to end the regular season, Campbell improved to help Praha advance to the semi-finals scoring a 1 and three assists in 16 post season games.

Without a new contract offer from Praha, Campbell returned to North America and signed a one-year contract with Texas-based Rio Grande Valley Killer Bees of the CHL. After an unsuccessful try-out at the AHL's San Antonio Rampage training camp, Campbell started the 2010–11 season with the Killer Bees.

On August 25, 2011, Campbell signed a one-year contract in the ECHL with the Chicago Express. He was invited to the Rockford IceHogs training camp for the 2011–12 season before he was returned to the Express. Campbell was later signed to PTO contracts with the Springfield Falcons and the Oklahoma City Barons of the AHL before again shortly returning to the ECHL.

On June 28, 2012, Campbell agreed to return to Europe, signing a one-year deal with German 2nd Bundesliga club, Eispiraten Crimmitschau. Campbell was amongst the Pirates scoring leaders from the Blueline with 35 points in 44 games.

On July 29, 2013, Campbell continued his journeyman career and signed a one-year contract to move to Italy with Pustertal-Val Pusteria Wolves of the then Elite.A.

== Career statistics ==
			Regular season					Playoffs
Season	Team	League	GP	G	A	Pts	PIM	GP	G	A	Pts	PIM
2002–03	Canmore Eagles	AJHL	62	10	37	47	112	—	—	—	—	—
2003–04	Canmore Eagles	AJHL	24	6	15	21	25	—	—	—	—	—
2003–04	Olds Grizzlys	AJHL	36	9	19	28	40	—	—	—	—	—
2004–05	Alaska-Fairbanks	CCHA	37	2	10	12	56	—	—	—	—	—
2005–06	Alaska-Fairbanks	CCHA	38	5	9	14	67	—	—	—	—	—
2006–07	Alaska-Fairbanks	CCHA	39	4	20	24	54	—	—	—	—	—
2006–07	Columbus Blue Jackets	NHL	1	0	0	0	0	—	—	—	—	—
2007–08	Syracuse Crunch	AHL	28	1	5	6	26	—	—	—	—	—
2007–08	Lake Erie Monsters	AHL	8	1	0	1	2	—	—	—	—	—
2008–09	Lake Erie Monsters	AHL	74	7	8	15	61	—	—	—	—	—
2009–10	TPS	SM-l	33	2	9	11	38	—	—	—	—	—
2009–10	HC Slavia Praha	CZE	12	0	1	1	14	16	1	3	4	10
2010–11	Rio Grande Valley Killer Bees	CHL	60	16	46	62	59	3	0	1	1	2
2011–12	Chicago Express	ECHL	61	8	29	37	87	—	—	—	—	—
2011–12	Springfield Falcons	AHL	3	0	0	0	2	—	—	—	—	—
2011–12	Oklahoma City Barons	AHL	2	0	0	0	2	—	—	—	—	—
2012–13	Eispiraten Crimmitschau	2.GBun	44	10	25	35	94	—	—	—	—	—
2013–14	Pustertal-Val Pusteria Wolves	ITL	42	7	24	31	60	16	2	4	6	22
NHL totals			1	0	0	0	0	—	—	—	—	—

== Awards and honours ==
Award	Year
CHL
All-CHL Team	2010–11

== See also ==
- List of players who played only one game in the NHL
