= Steven Goertzen =

Canadian ice hockey player (born 1984)

- Born: May 26, 1984 (age 41) Stony Plain, Alberta, Canada
- Height: 6 ft 2 in (188 cm)
- Weight: 216 lb (98 kg; 15 st 6 lb)
- Position: Right wing
- Shot: Right
- Played for: Columbus Blue Jackets; Phoenix Coyotes; Carolina Hurricanes; BK Mladá Boleslav; Sheffield Steelers; Coventry Blaze
- NHL draft: 225th overall, 2002; Columbus Blue Jackets
- Playing career: 2003–2015

Steven Goertzen (born May 26, 1984) is a Canadian-born former professional ice hockey winger who played in the National Hockey League for the Columbus Blue Jackets, Phoenix Coyotes and the Carolina Hurricanes.

== Playing career ==
Born in Stony Plain, Alberta, Goertzen started his junior hockey career with the tier II St. Albert Saints of the Alberta Junior Hockey League, but soon caught on with the Western Hockey League's Seattle Thunderbirds. After his first season with Seattle, Goertzen was selected 225th overall in the 2002 NHL entry draft by the Columbus Blue Jackets, and after three seasons and 81 points with the Thunderbirds, Goertzen moved to the professional ranks.

So far, Goertzen's career has been marked by low point totals, with his best professional season being in 2004–05 when he spread twelve points out between the AHL and ECHL. However, in the 2005–06 NHL season, Goertzen made his NHL debut with Columbus, and in thirty-nine games failed to record a point before being returned to the American Hockey League.

He failed to score a point in his first 48 career games. In his 49th career game, as a member of the Phoenix Coyotes, he scored his first two career points, both assists, in a 6–3 loss to the Edmonton Oilers.

On July 8, 2009, he signed as an unrestricted free agent with the Carolina Hurricanes. On November 10, 2010, he signed a one-year contract with the Springfield Falcons, for whom he had been playing on a professional tryout (PTO) contract.

On July 26, 2012, it was announced that Goertzen had signed for the Sheffield Steelers in the U.K. Elite Ice Hockey League. After two seasons, he switched to the Coventry Blaze. At the conclusion of the 2014–15 season with the Blaze on June 28, 2015, Goertzen announced his retirement from professional hockey.

== Career statistics ==
			Regular season					Playoffs
Season	Team	League	GP	G	A	Pts	PIM	GP	G	A	Pts	PIM
2000–01	St. Albert Raiders AAA	AMHL	34	11	18	29	70	—	—	—	—	—
2000–01	St. Albert Saints	AJHL	1	0	0	0	0	—	—	—	—	—
2001–02	Seattle Thunderbirds	WHL	66	6	9	15	45	11	2	0	2	4
2002–03	Seattle Thunderbirds	WHL	71	12	19	31	95	14	4	3	7	9
2003–04	Seattle Thunderbirds	WHL	69	15	18	33	115	—	—	—	—	—
2003–04	Syracuse Crunch	AHL	8	0	3	3	4	1	0	0	0	0
2004–05	Syracuse Crunch	AHL	57	2	7	9	100	—	—	—	—	—
2004–05	Dayton Bombers	ECHL	11	0	3	3	2	—	—	—	—	—
2005–06	Columbus Blue Jackets	NHL	39	0	0	0	44	—	—	—	—	—
2005–06	Syracuse Crunch	AHL	32	5	5	10	41	—	—	—	—	—
2006–07	Syracuse Crunch	AHL	60	9	7	16	120	—	—	—	—	—
2006–07	Columbus Blue Jackets	NHL	7	0	0	0	10	—	—	—	—	—
2007–08	Syracuse Crunch	AHL	59	8	5	13	72	—	—	—	—	—
2007–08	San Antonio Rampage	AHL	22	1	3	4	34	7	1	0	1	5
2008–09	San Antonio Rampage	AHL	57	6	8	14	90	7	1	0	1	5
2008–09	Phoenix Coyotes	NHL	16	2	2	4	24	—	—	—	—	—
2009–10	Albany River Rats	AHL	71	8	15	23	85	8	0	1	1	7
2009–10	Carolina Hurricanes	NHL	6	0	0	0	5	—	—	—	—	—
2010–11	Springfield Falcons	AHL	65	7	9	16	48	—	—	—	—	—
2011–12	BK Mladá Boleslav	ELH	43	2	1	3	75	—	—	—	—	—
2012–13	Sheffield Steelers	EIHL	50	19	21	40	54	2	0	2	2	0
2013–14	Sheffield Steelers	EIHL	36	10	23	33	16	4	1	2	3	0
2014–15	Coventry Blaze	EIHL	44	13	26	39	27	4	1	2	3	2
AHL totals			439	48	65	113	608	22	1	2	3	46
NHL totals			68	2	2	4	83	—	—	—	—	—
EIHL totals			130	42	70	112	97	10	2	6	8	2
