= Fredrik Modin =

Swedish ice hockey player

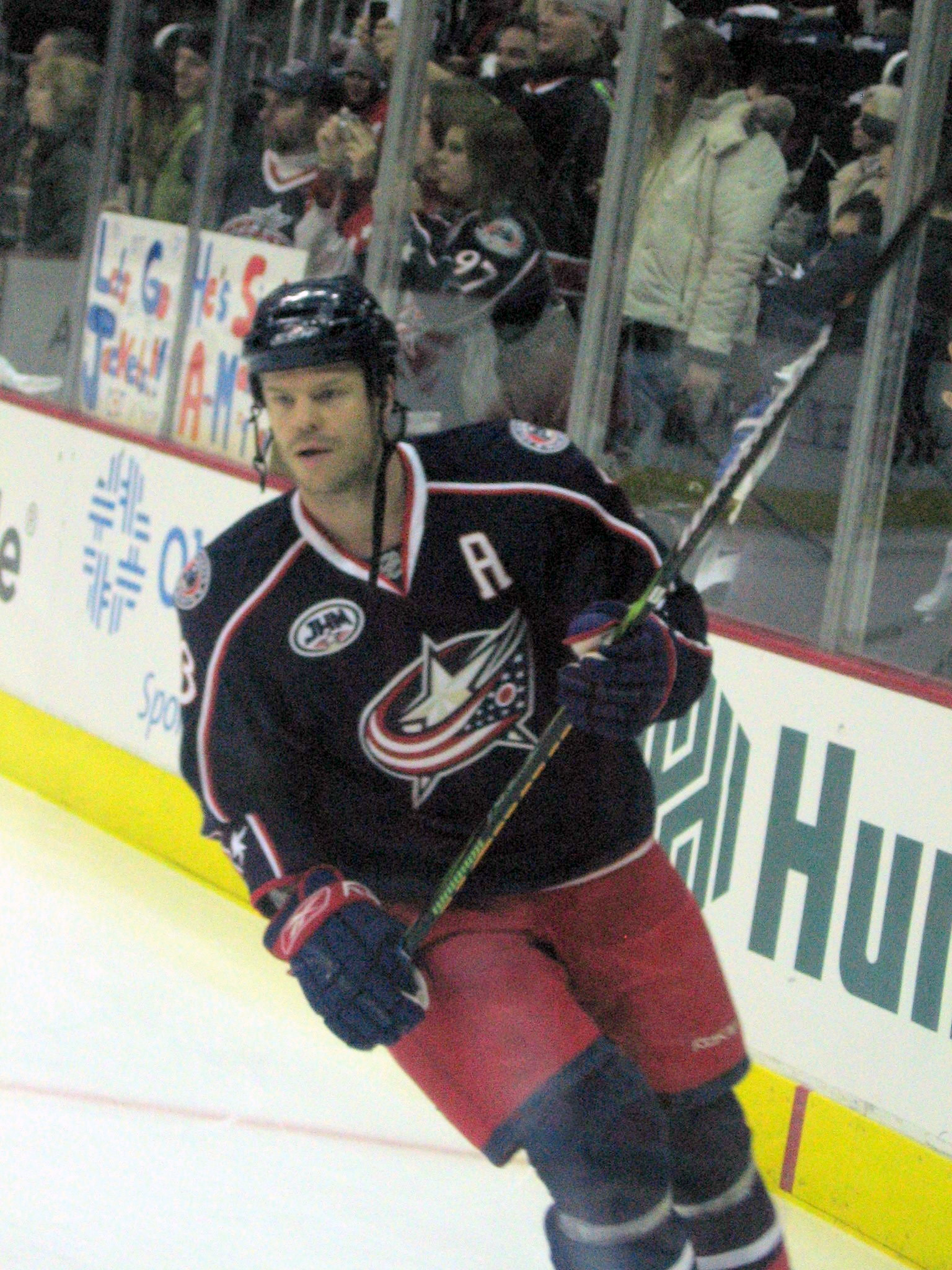
- Modin with the Columbus Blue Jackets in 2009
- Born: 8 October 1974 (age 51) Sundsvall, Sweden
- Height: 6 ft 4 in (193 cm)
- Weight: 220 lb (100 kg; 15 st 10 lb)
- Position: Left wing
- Shot: Left
- Played for: Timrå IK; Brynäs IF; Toronto Maple Leafs; Tampa Bay Lightning; Columbus Blue Jackets; Los Angeles Kings; Atlanta Thrashers; Calgary Flames
- National team: Sweden
- NHL draft: 64th overall, 1994; Toronto Maple Leafs
- Playing career: 1991–2011

Jan Fredrik Modin (born 8 October 1974) is a Swedish former professional ice hockey player. A left winger, he played 14 seasons in the National Hockey League (NHL). He is best remembered for his most productive years with the Tampa Bay Lightning, with whom he won the Stanley Cup in 2004.

== Playing career ==
Modin played his youth league games for Njurunda SK, like Henrik Zetterberg.

Modin was drafted 64th overall by the Toronto Maple Leafs in the 1994 NHL entry draft. He was traded to the Tampa Bay Lightning on October 1, 1999, where he served as an alternate captain for several seasons. In 2001, he was the lone Lightning player at the 51st NHL All-Star Game and won the "Hardest Shot" competition with a blast clocked at 102.1 mph. He went on to win the Stanley Cup with the Lightning in the 2003–04 season. For the 2004–05 season, Fredrik Modin returned to Sweden to play for Timrå IK due to the NHL lockout. He scored 12 goals, 24 assists and had a total of 36 points. On June 30, 2006, he was traded to the Columbus Blue Jackets (along with Fredrik Norrena) in exchange for Marc Denis.

Modin served as an alternate captain for the Blue Jackets. He has begun to decline in production, due to injuries. He scored a goal in game four of the Blue Jackets' opening round playoff series against the Detroit Red Wings, the Blue Jackets' first-ever playoff appearance.

During the 2009–10 season, at the NHL trade deadline, Modin was traded by the Blue Jackets to the Los Angeles Kings for future considerations on March 3, 2010.

On September 6, 2010, Modin signed a one-year contract as a free agent with the Atlanta Thrashers. He posted 7 goals in 36 games for the Thrashers. On February 28, 2011, Modin was traded to the Calgary Flames for a seventh round pick in the 2011 NHL entry draft.

Hampered by a lingering back injury in his last two seasons, Modin announced his retirement on May 19, 2011.

== Awards ==
- Gold medal at the Ice Hockey World Championship in 1998.
- Played in the NHL All-Star Game in 2000-2001.
- Hardest Shot at NHL SuperSkills Competition in 2001 (102.1 mph).
- Bronze medal at the Ice Hockey World Championship in 2001.
- Stanley Cup winner with Tampa Bay Lightning in 2004.
- He is a member of the Triple Gold Club having won the 1998 World Championships, the 2004 Stanley Cup with Tampa Bay Lightning and Olympic Gold Medal in 2006.
- Most points in World Cup of Hockey 2004
- All-star team World Cup of Hockey 2004
- Gold medal at the Winter Olympics in 2006.

== Career statistics ==
=== Regular season and playoffs ===
			Regular season					Playoffs
Season	Team	League	GP	G	A	Pts	PIM	GP	G	A	Pts	PIM
1991–92	Timrå IK	SWE II	11	1	0	1	0	—	—	—	—	—
1992–93	Timrå IK	SWE II	30	5	7	12	12	5	1	0	1	0
1993–94	Timrå IK	SWE II	32	16	16	32	34	2	0	1	1	6
1994–95	Brynäs IF	SEL	37	9	10	19	30	14	4	4	8	6
1995–96	Brynäs IF	SEL	22	4	8	12	22	—	—	—	—	—
1995–96	Brynäs IF	Allsv	14	7	3	10	18	10	6	4	10	4
1996–97	Toronto Maple Leafs	NHL	76	6	7	13	24	—	—	—	—	—
1997–98	Toronto Maple Leafs	NHL	74	16	16	32	32	—	—	—	—	—
1998–99	Toronto Maple Leafs	NHL	67	16	15	31	35	8	0	0	0	6
1999–2000	Tampa Bay Lightning	NHL	80	22	26	48	18	—	—	—	—	—
2000–01	Tampa Bay Lightning	NHL	76	32	24	56	48	—	—	—	—	—
2001–02	Tampa Bay Lightning	NHL	54	14	17	31	27	—	—	—	—	—
2002–03	Tampa Bay Lightning	NHL	76	17	23	40	43	11	2	0	2	18
2003–04	Tampa Bay Lightning	NHL	82	29	28	57	32	23	8	11	19	10
2004–05	Timrå IK	SEL	43	12	24	36	58	7	1	1	2	8
2005–06	Tampa Bay Lightning	NHL	77	31	23	54	56	5	0	0	0	6
2006–07	Columbus Blue Jackets	NHL	79	22	20	42	50	—	—	—	—	—
2007–08	Columbus Blue Jackets	NHL	23	6	6	12	20	—	—	—	—	—
2008–09	Columbus Blue Jackets	NHL	50	9	16	25	28	4	1	0	1	0
2009–10	Columbus Blue Jackets	NHL	24	2	4	6	12	—	—	—	—	—
2009–10	Los Angeles Kings	NHL	20	3	2	5	14	6	3	1	4	2
2010–11	Atlanta Thrashers	NHL	36	7	3	10	12	—	—	—	—	—
2010–11	Calgary Flames	NHL	4	0	0	0	2	—	—	—	—	—
2013–14	Njurunda SK	SWE IV	1	0	1	1	2	—	—	—	—	—
SWE II totals			73	22	23	45	46	5	1	0	1	0
SEL totals			102	25	42	67	110	21	5	5	10	14
NHL totals			898	232	230	462	453	57	14	12	26	42

=== International ===
Fredrik Modin
Medal record

Representing Sweden

Ice hockey

Winter Olympics
Gold medal – first place	2006 Turin	

World Championships
Gold medal – first place	1998 Lugano	
Bronze medal – third place	2001 Nuremberg	

World Junior Championships
Silver medal – second place	1994 Ostrava	

Year	Team	Event	GP	G	A	Pts	PIM
1994	Sweden	WJC	7	2	2	4	2
1996	Sweden	WC	6	1	1	2	4
1998	Sweden	WC	5	3	3	6	0
2000	Sweden	WC	7	3	1	4	4
2001	Sweden	WC	9	3	2	5	10
2004	Sweden	WCH	4	4	4	8	2
2006	Sweden	OG	8	2	1	3	6
2010	Sweden	OG	3	0	1	1	0
Senior totals			42	16	13	29	26
