= David Výborný =

Czech ice hockey player

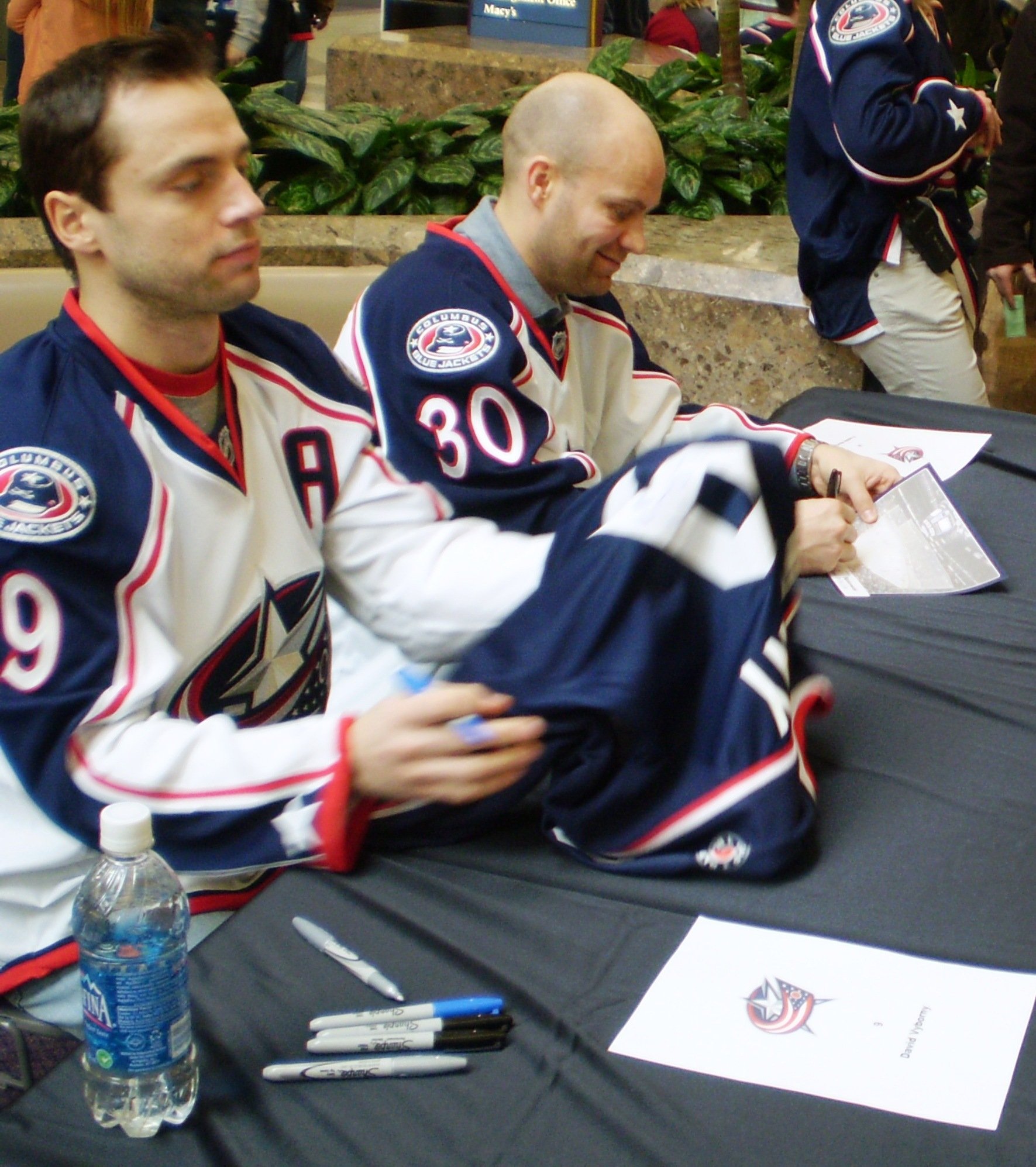
- Výborný (left) in 2008
- Born: January 22, 1975 (age 51) Jihlava, Czechoslovakia
- Height: 5 ft 10 in (178 cm)
- Weight: 189 lb (86 kg; 13 st 7 lb)
- Position: Right wing
- Shot: Left
- Played for: Sparta Praha; Modo Hockey; Columbus Blue Jackets; BK Mladá Boleslav
- National team: Czech Republic
- NHL draft: 33rd overall, 1993; Edmonton Oilers
- Playing career: 1992–2016

David Výborný (born January 22, 1975) is a Czech former professional ice hockey player who last played for BK Mladá Boleslav of the Czech Extraliga. He played for the Columbus Blue Jackets of the National Hockey League (NHL). Internationally, he played for the Czech Republic men's national team and won five World Championships, and a bronze medal in ice hockey at the 2006 Winter Olympics. He was inducted into the IIHF Hall of Fame in 2025.

== Playing career ==
=== Early career ===
Výborný first rose to prominence playing with Sparta Prague of the Czech Extraliga in 1992. He scored 20 goals and 44 points in 52 games, all as a teenager. The Edmonton Oilers picked Výborný up in the second round of the 1993 NHL entry draft, and he proved that he was not a fluke by scoring 46 points for Sparta in the next season.

Výborný came over to North America for the 1994–95 season and played for the Cape Breton Oilers of the American Hockey League (AHL). He again performed quite well, scoring 61 points in 76 games, third most on his team and fifth most among AHL rookies. However, he headed back to Europe after only one season in the AHL. Upon his return to Sparta, he scored at a rigorous pace. He scored 42 points in 40 games and helped Sparta into the playoffs, where he again scored more than a point per game. Výborný spent one more season in Prague and continued to improve with 49 points in 47 games; he added 14 more in the playoffs.

Výborný was a star in the Czech Republic, but he went to Sweden for the 1997–98 season. He played for Modo and led the team in scoring. Again, after just one season abroad, Výborný went back to Sparta Prague. In the 1998–99 season, Výborný cemented his place as one of the stars of the Czech hockey scene. He scored 70 points in 52 games and won the Extraliga's scoring title by 18 points. In the next season, he continued to rack up points and finished second in the league's scoring race. He also won a championship with Sparta. Finally, it seemed as if Výborný had nothing left to prove in the Czech Republic.

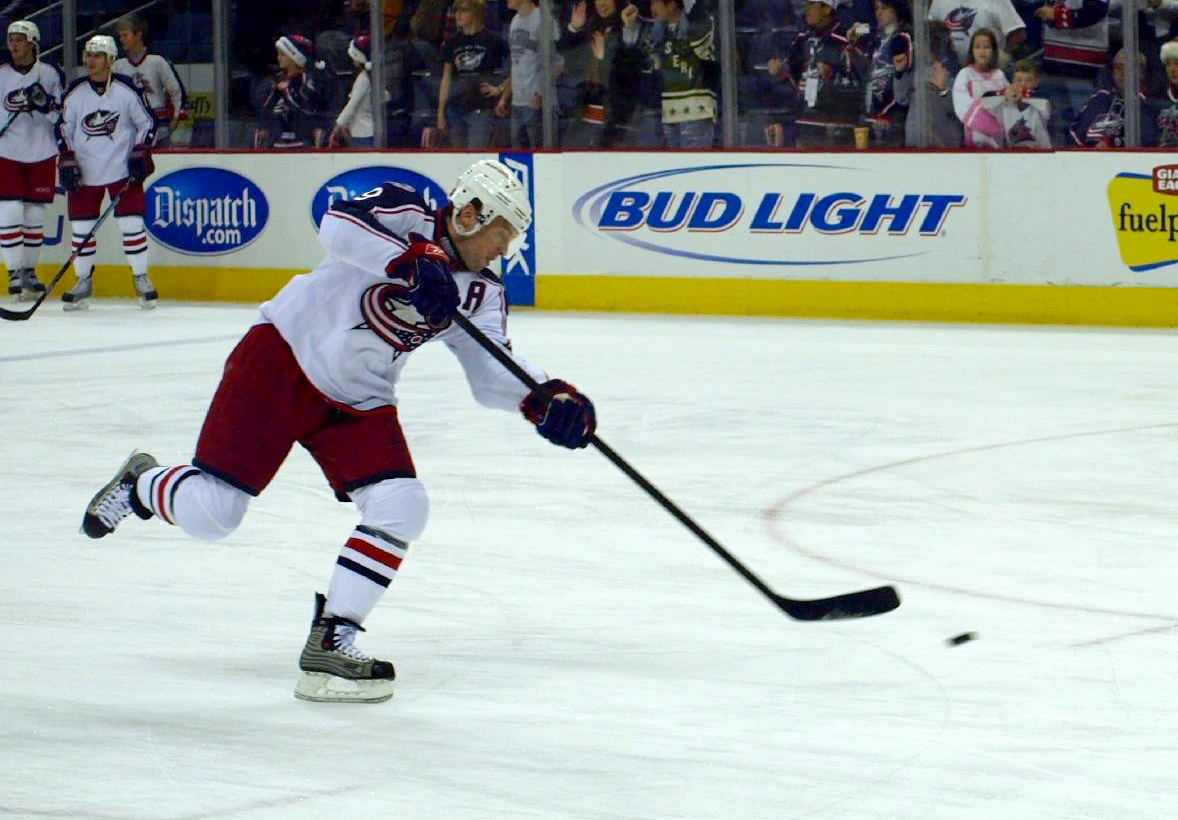
David Vyborny shoots the puck in a pre-game warm-up with the Columbus Blue Jackets during the 2007–08 season

=== NHL career ===
On June 8, 2000, Výborný was signed by the Columbus Blue Jackets to add some scoring punch in their first season. He debuted in the NHL on October 7, and scored a goal in his very first NHL game. His production for Columbus was much less than it had been in Prague. In the end, he scored 13 goals and 19 assists, for a total of 32 points in 79 games. He was also ranked 10th among rookies for goals and points and was the first rookie ever to score on multiple penalty shots in one season.

Výborný's performance (31 points) was very similar in his second season. As the Blue Jackets improved, though, so did Výborný. In the 2002–03 NHL season, he scored 46 points and led his team with a +12 plus/minus, which set a record for the Blue Jackets. Výborný improved still more for the 2003–04 NHL season, and he scored 22 goals and 31 assists, for a total of 53 points. He led Columbus in assists and came in second to Rick Nash in goals and points. In addition to his offensive talent, Výborný has proved to be quite durable, as he currently holds the Blue Jackets record for the most consecutive games, with 161. He tied for fourth in the NHL in shorthanded goals with four, another record for the Blue Jackets.

Výborný played for Sparta Prague during the 2004–05 NHL lockout.

=== Back to Europe ===
On April 25, 2008, it was announced that Výborný was returning to Sparta Prague for the 2008–09 season. With his departure, Rostislav Klesla became the only remaining player from the Blue Jackets' inaugural season. In 2011, Výborný signed with BK Mlada Boleslav. He helped the club win back-to-back championships in the Czech second-division in 2013 and 2014 and earn promotion to the top Czech division in 2014. After suffering a torn ACL, he announced his retirement on March 15, 2016.

== Awards and achievements ==
- Played in the Czech Ice Hockey Extraliga All-Star game in 1999 and 2000
- Appeared on the cover of the Czech edition of the NHL 2K7 video game.

== Records ==
- NHL record for most penalty shot goals in a season by a rookie

== International play ==
Výborný won five World Championships with the Czech Republic men's national ice hockey team and a bronze medal in ice hockey at the 2006 Winter Olympics. At the 2006 IIHF World Championship, when capturing silver, he was named to the all-tournament team. At the 1997 and 1998 World Championships, he won bronze. He was inducted into the IIHF Hall of Fame in 2025.

== Career statistics ==
=== Regular season and playoffs ===
			Regular season					Playoffs
Season	Team	League	GP	G	A	Pts	PIM	GP	G	A	Pts	PIM
1990–91	Sparta Praha	CSSR	3	0	0	0	0	—	—	—	—	—
1991–92	Sparta Praha	CSSR	31	6	11	17	—	—	—	—	—	—
1992–93	Sparta Praha	CSSR	52	20	24	44	—	—	—	—	—	—
1993–94	Sparta Praha	CZE	43	10	18	28	0	8	4	4	8	0
1994–95	Cape Breton Oilers	AHL	76	23	38	61	30	—	—	—	—	—
1995–96	Sparta Praha	CZE	40	12	31	43	23	11	6	6	12	10
1996–97	Sparta Praha	CZE	43	19	28	47	12	10	7	7	14	6
1997–98	Modo Hockey	SEL	45	16	21	37	34	9	0	2	2	2
1998–99	Sparta Praha	CZE	49	23	44	67	22	8	1	3	4	0
1999–00	Sparta Praha	CZE	50	25	38	63	30	9	3	8	11	4
2000–01	Columbus Blue Jackets	NHL	79	13	19	32	22	—	—	—	—	—
2001–02	Columbus Blue Jackets	NHL	75	13	18	31	6	—	—	—	—	—
2002–03	Columbus Blue Jackets	NHL	79	20	26	46	16	—	—	—	—	—
2003–04	Columbus Blue Jackets	NHL	82	22	31	53	40	—	—	—	—	—
2004–05	Sparta Praha	CZE	51	12	34	46	10	5	2	5	7	4
2005–06	Columbus Blue Jackets	NHL	80	22	43	65	50	—	—	—	—	—
2006–07	Columbus Blue Jackets	NHL	82	16	48	64	60	—	—	—	—	—
2007–08	Columbus Blue Jackets	NHL	66	7	19	26	34	—	—	—	—	—
2008–09	Sparta Praha	CZE	52	15	28	43	14	11	8	4	12	4
2009–10	Sparta Praha	CZE	51	8	32	40	49	7	1	2	3	4
2010–11	Sparta Praha	CZE	49	8	9	17	24	—	—	—	—	—
2011–12	BK Mladá Boleslav	CZE	41	8	22	30	22	—	—	—	—	—
2012–13	BK Mladá Boleslav	CZE-2	50	17	37	54	30	22	8	21	29	31
2013–14	BK Mladá Boleslav	CZE-2	40	13	42	55	24	16	4	9	13	6
2014–15	BK Mladá Boleslav	CZE	49	11	28	39	32	9	3	5	8	4
2015–16	BK Mladá Boleslav	CZE	42	8	17	25	20	1	0	0	0	0
CSSR totals			86	26	35	61	—	—	—	—	—	—
CZE totals			551	155	326	481	258	79	35	44	79	36
NHL totals			543	113	204	317	228	—	—	—	—	—

=== International ===
David Výborný
Medal record

Men's ice hockey

Olympic Games
Bronze medal – third place	2006 Turin	Ice hockey

World Championships
Gold medal – first place	1996 Vienna	Ice hockey
Gold medal – first place	1999 Norway	Ice hockey
Gold medal – first place	2000 Russia	Ice hockey
Gold medal – first place	2001 Germany	Ice hockey
Gold medal – first place	2005 Vienna	Ice hockey
Silver medal – second place	2006 Riga	Ice hockey
Bronze medal – third place	1997 Helsinki	Ice hockey
Bronze medal – third place	1998 Zürich	Ice hockey

Year	Team	Event	GP	G	A	Pts	PIM
1992	Czechoslovakia	EJC	6	6	8	14	0
1993	Czechoslovakia	EJC	6	7	5	12	0
1993	Czechoslovakia	WJC	7	6	9	15	12
1994	Czech Republic	WJC	7	2	5	7	6
1996	Czech Republic	WC	8	2	2	4	2
1997	Czech Republic	WC	9	2	1	3	2
1998	Czech Republic	WC	9	2	4	6	0
1999	Czech Republic	WC	10	4	4	8	6
2000	Czech Republic	WC	9	4	6	10	6
2001	Czech Republic	WC	9	2	0	2	4
2002	Czech Republic	WC	7	1	3	4	16
2003	Czech Republic	WC	9	4	1	5	8
2004	Czech Republic	WCH	5	0	0	0	2
2005	Czech Republic	WC	9	1	3	4	8
2006	Czech Republic	OG	8	1	3	4	0
2006	Czech Republic	WC	9	3	6	9	2
2007	Czech Republic	WC	7	1	5	6	2
Junior totals			26	21	27	48	18
Senior totals			115	28	39	67	58
