= Jokila =

Surname list

Jokila is a surname. Notable people with the surname include:

- Janne Jokila (born 1982), Finnish ice hockey player
- Jarmo Jokila (born 1986), Finnish ice hockey player

== See also ==
- Jokela (surname)
