= List of Columbus Blue Jackets draft picks =

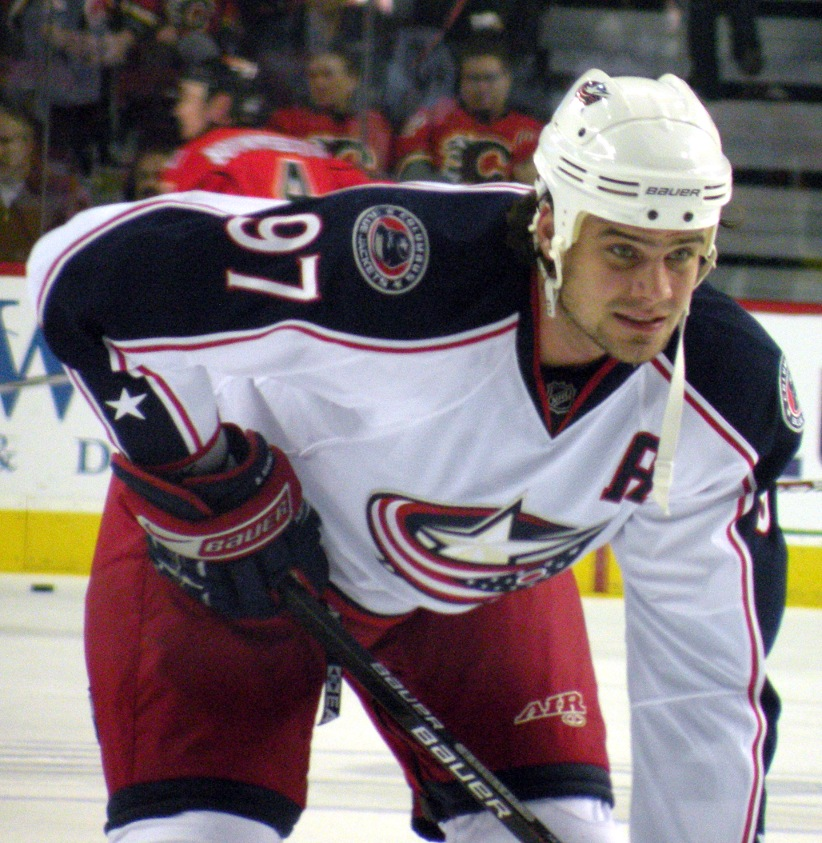
Rostislav Klesla, selected 4th overall in 2000, was the first draft pick in franchise history.

This is a list of ice hockey players who were drafted in the National Hockey League entry draft by the Columbus Blue Jackets franchise. It includes every player who was drafted, regardless of whether they played for the team.

== Key ==
Played at least one game with the Blue Jackets
Spent entire NHL career with the Blue Jackets

Statistics
Pos	Position	GP	Games played
G	Goals	A	Assists
Pts	Points	PIM	Penalties in minutes
GAA	Goals against average	W	Wins
L	Losses	OT	Overtime or shootout losses
SV%	Save percentage		Does not apply

Positions
G	Goaltender
D	Defenseman
LW	Left wing
C	Center
RW	Right wing
F	Forward

== Draft picks ==
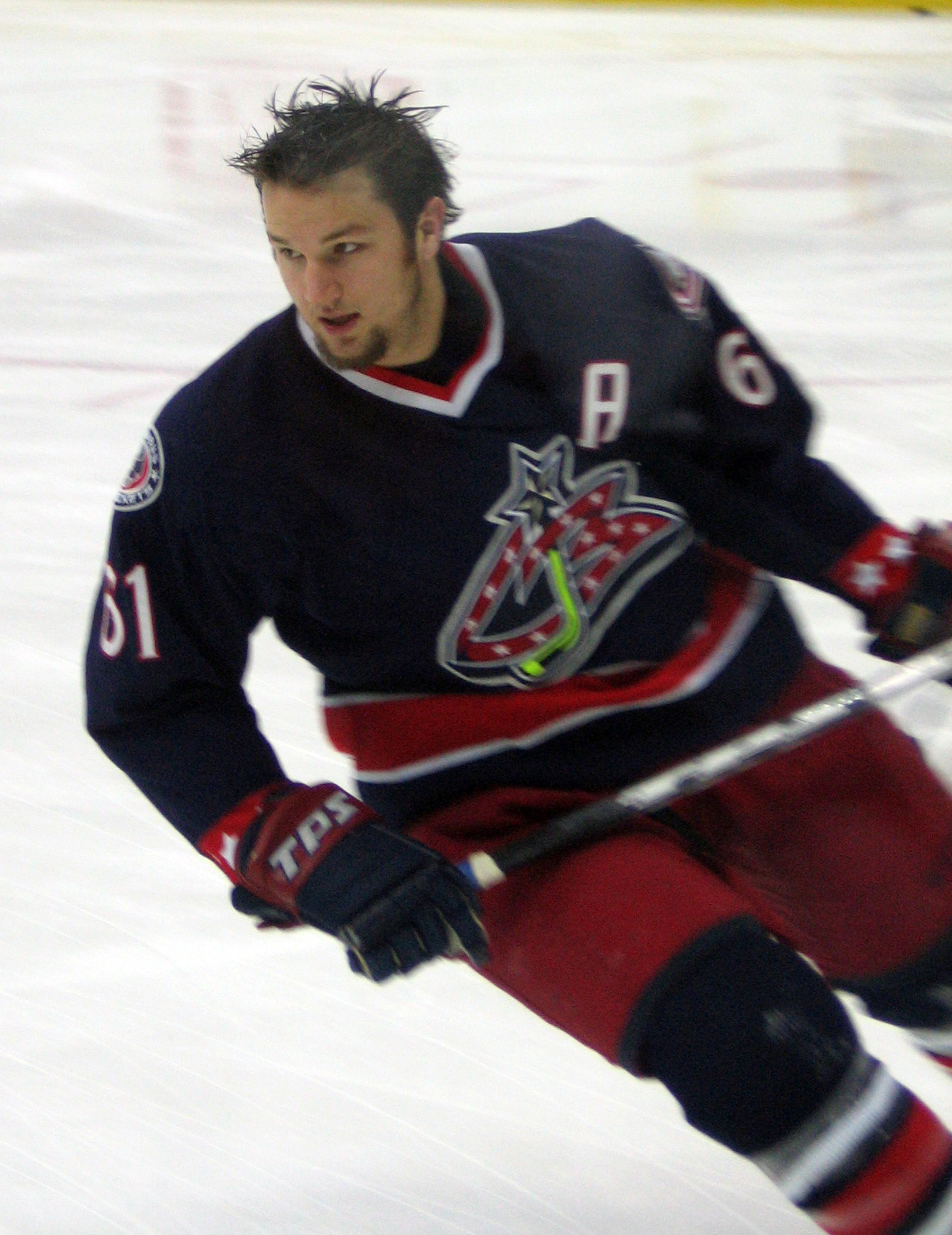
The Blue Jackets selected Rick Nash first overall in 2002.

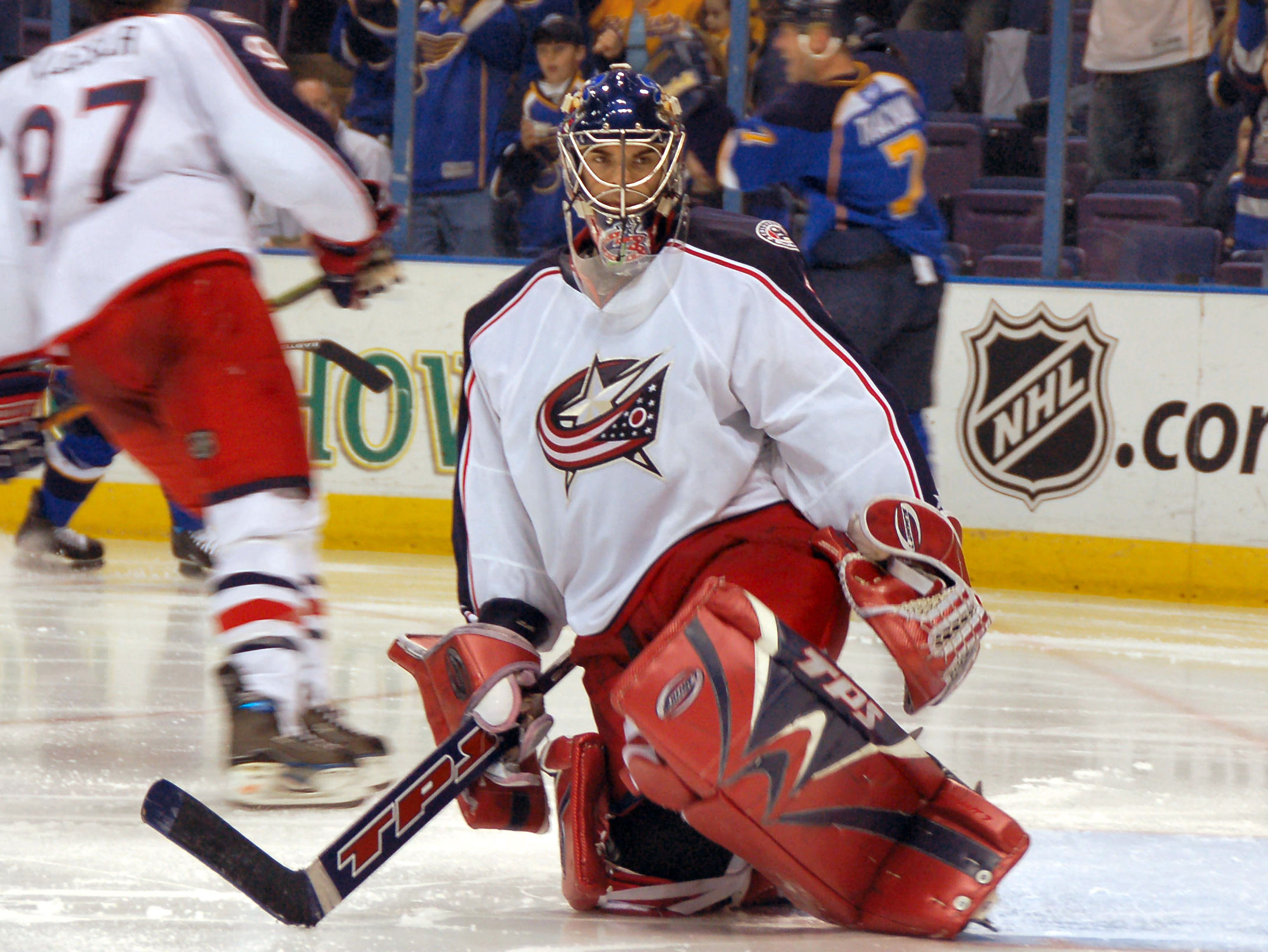
The Blue Jackets selected Pascal Leclaire eighth overall in 2001.

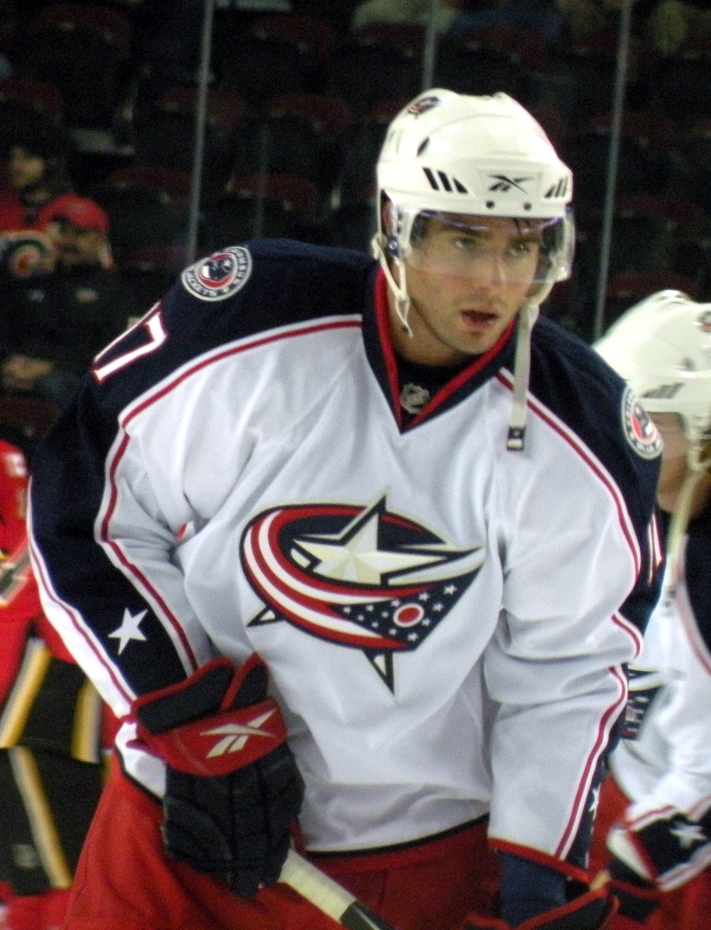
The Blue Jackets selected Andrew Murray 242nd overall in 2001.

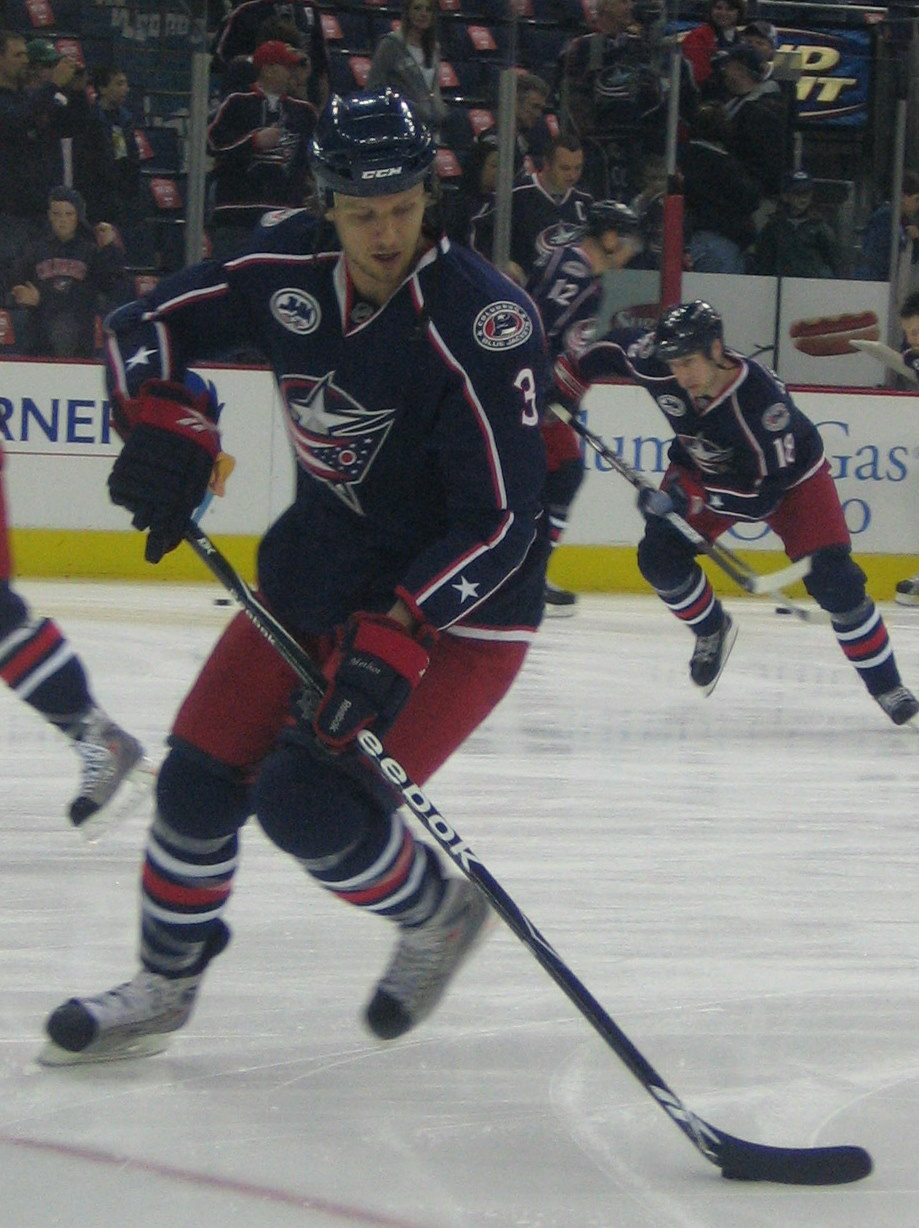
The Blue Jackets selected Marc Methot 168th overall in 2003.

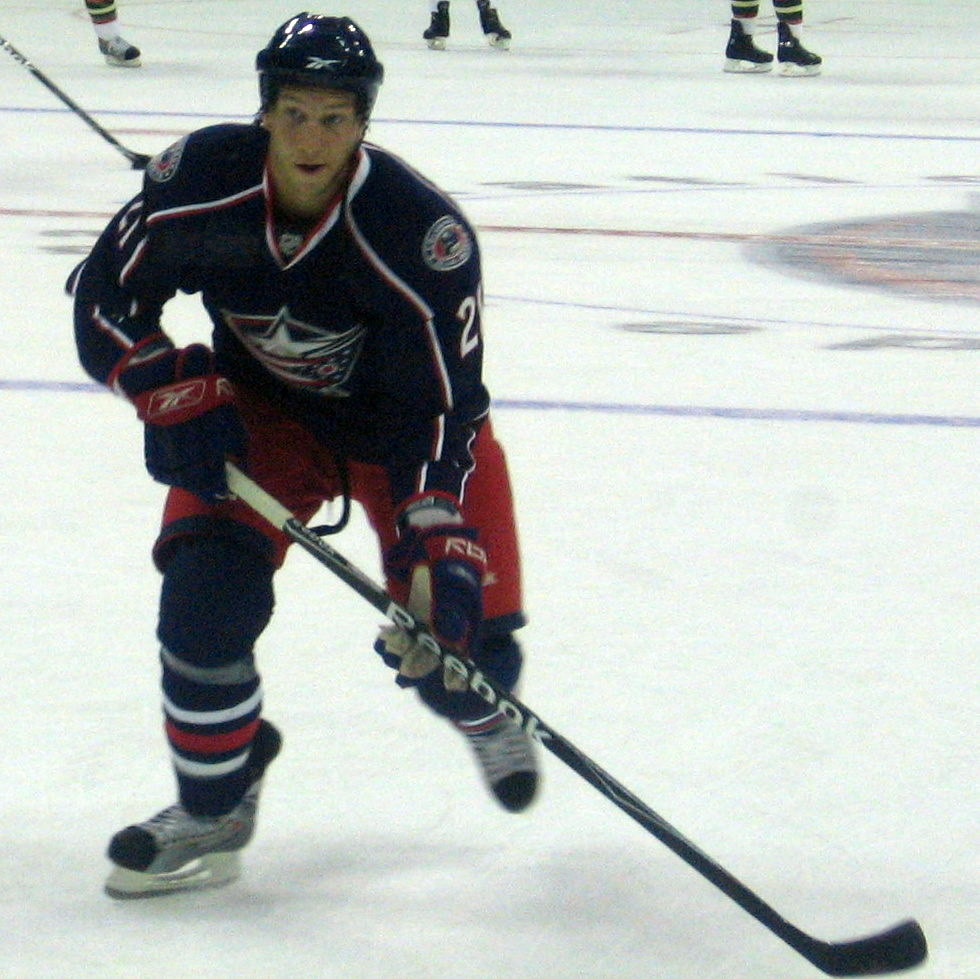
The Blue Jackets selected Alexandre Picard eighth overall in 2004.

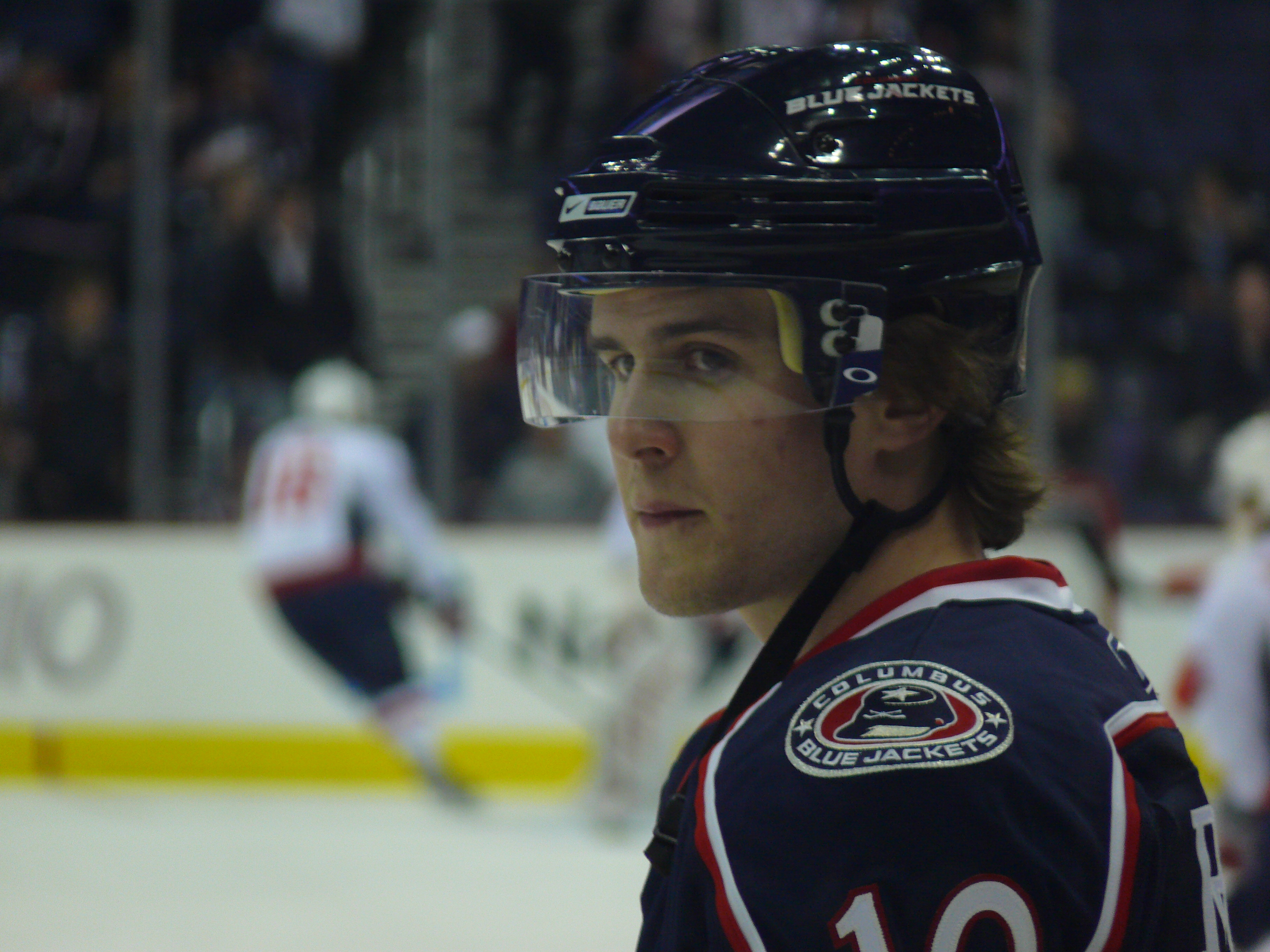
The Blue Jackets selected Kris Russell 67th overall in 2005.

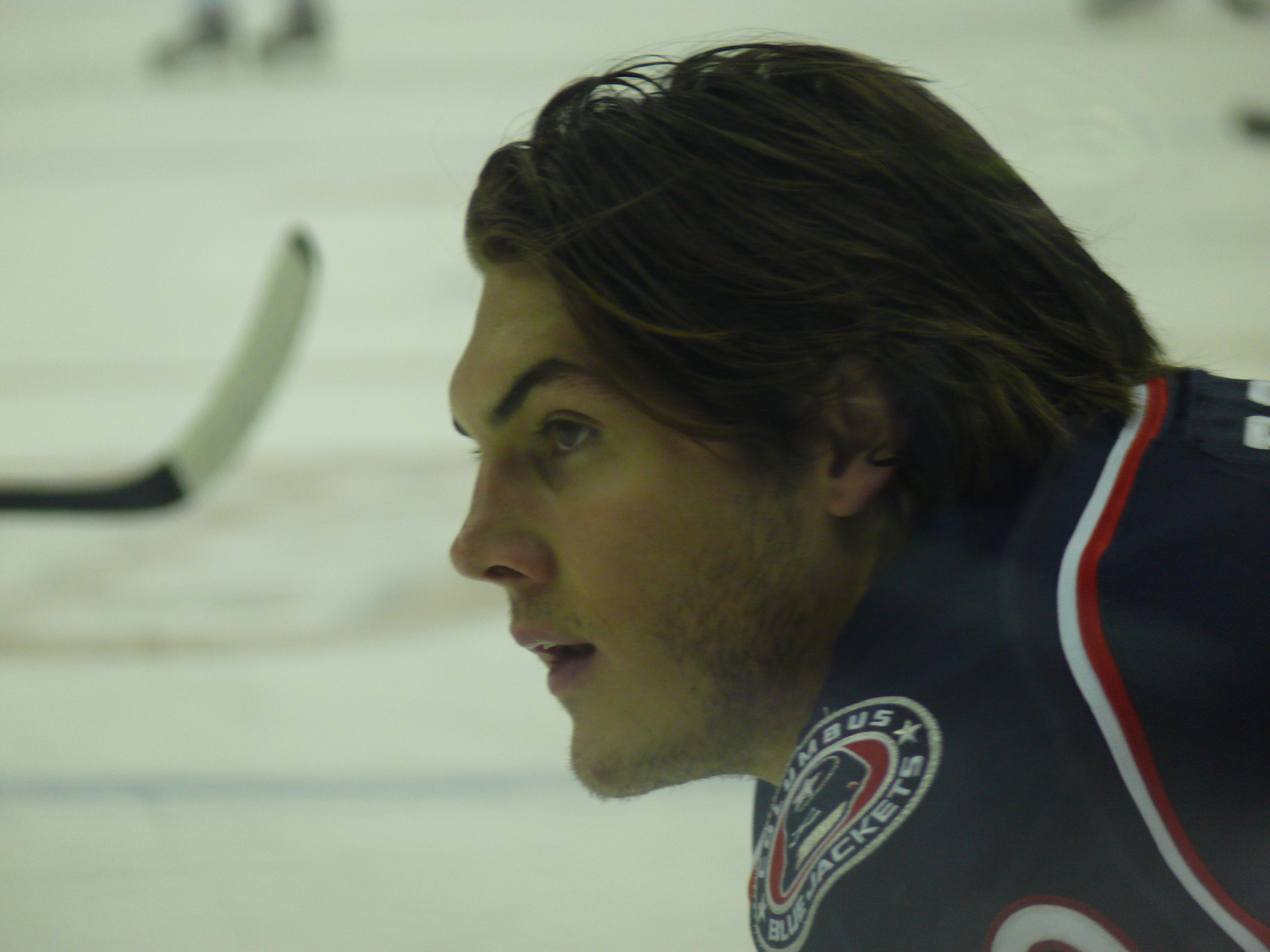
The Blue Jackets selected Jared Boll 101st overall in 2005.

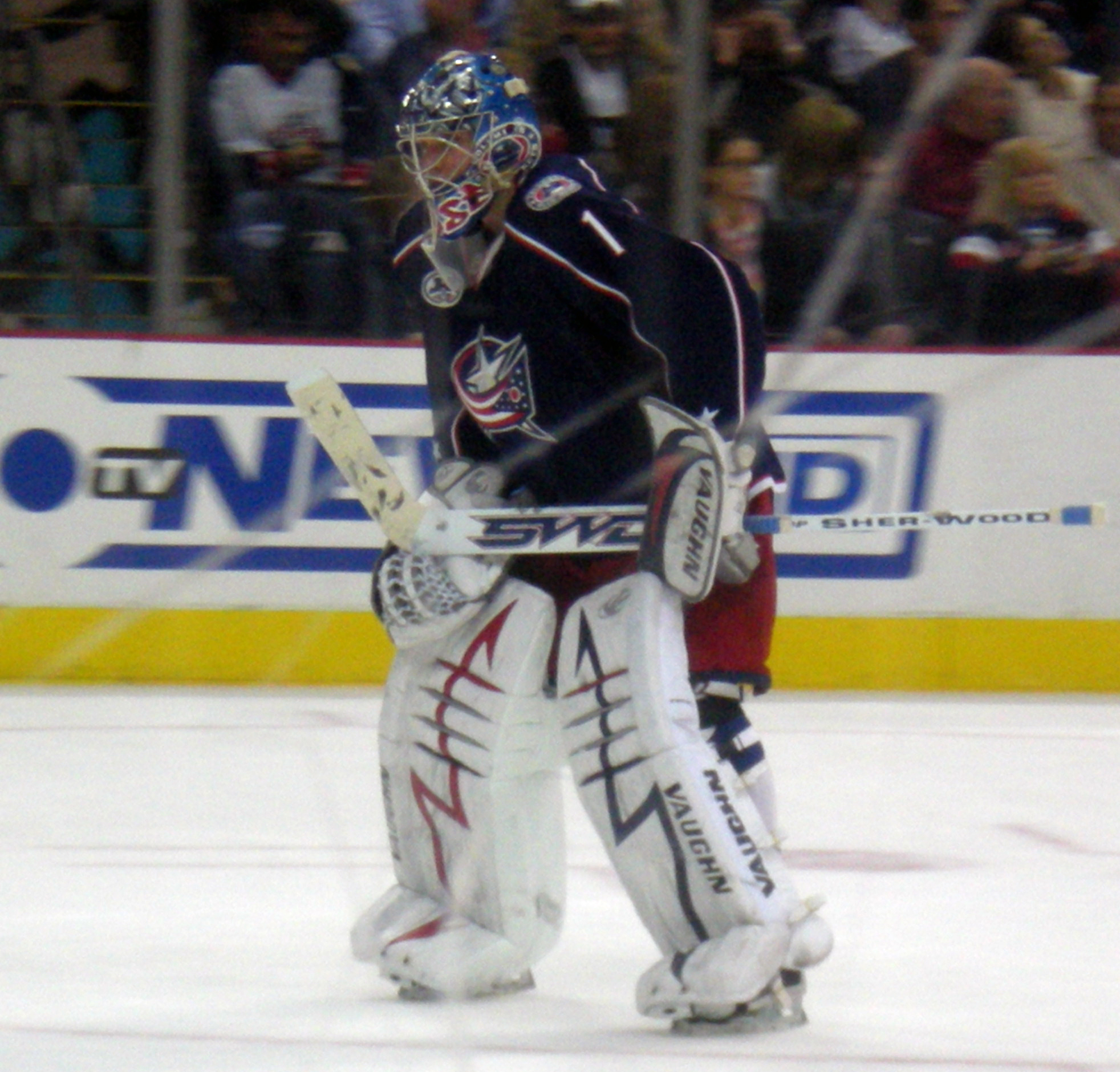
The Blue Jackets selected Steve Mason 69th overall in 2006.

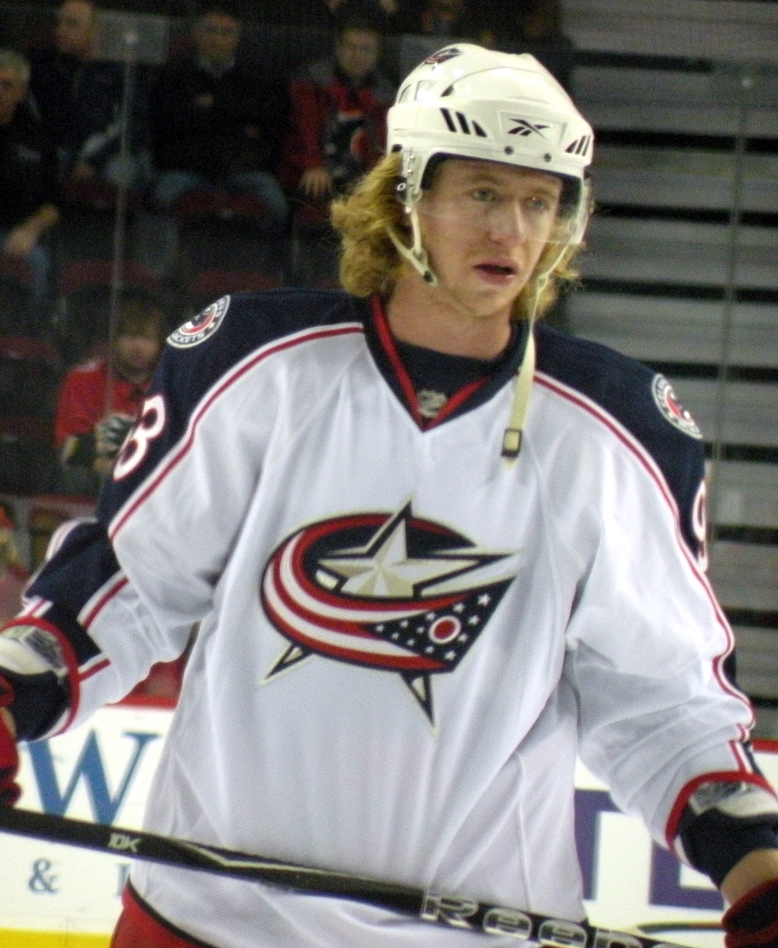
The Blue Jackets selected Jakub Voracek seventh overall in 2007.

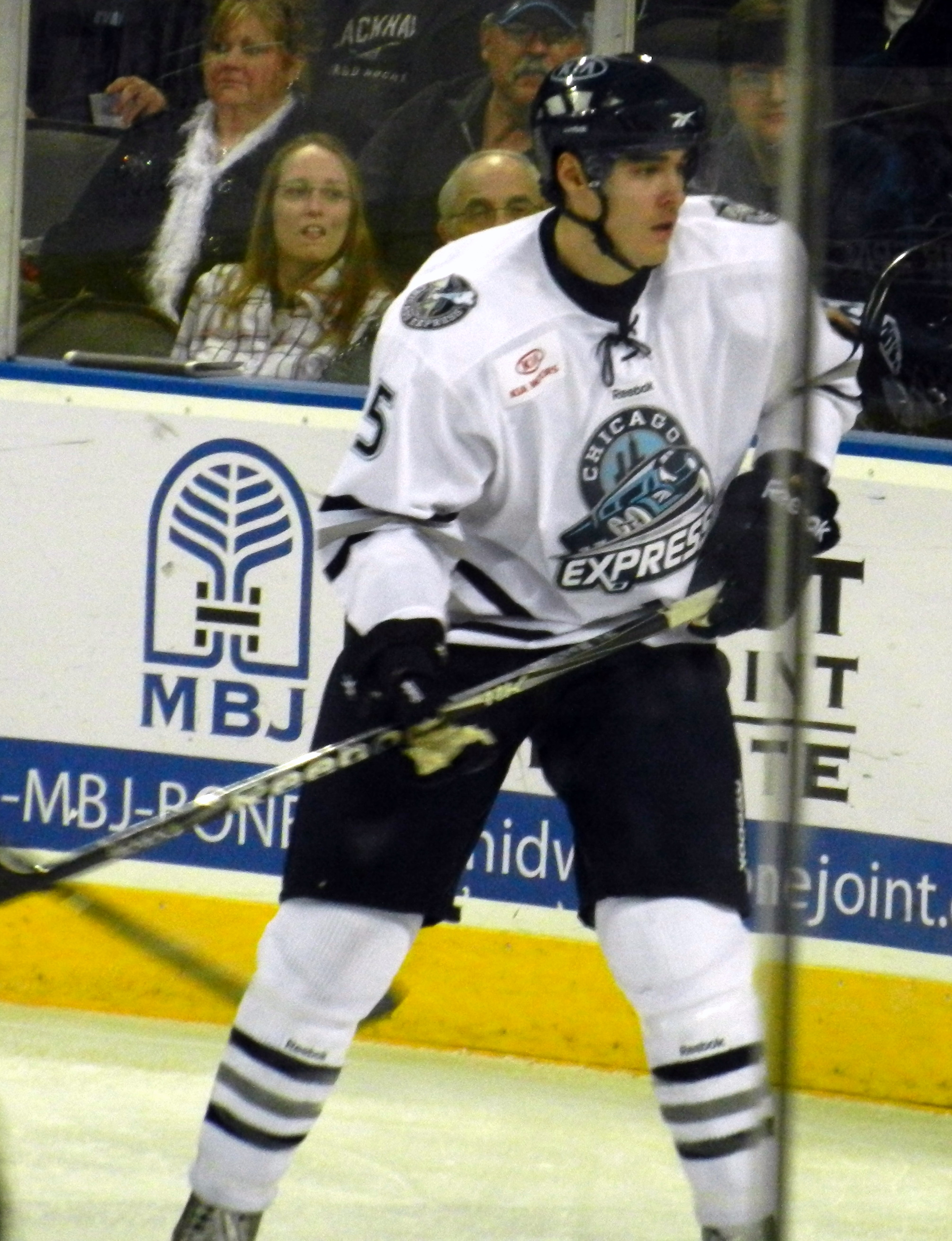
Steven Delisle, shown here with the Chicago Express, was drafted in the fourth round in 2008

Statistics are complete as of the 2025–26 NHL season and show each player's career regular season totals in the NHL. Wins, losses, ties, overtime losses and goals against average apply to goaltenders and are used only for players at that position. A player listed with a blank under the games played column has not played in the NHL.

Year	Round	Pick	Player	Nationality	Pos	GP	G	A	Pts	PIM	W	L	OT	SV%	GAA
2000	1	4	Rostislav Klesla	Czech Republic	D	659	48	111	159	620					
2000	3	69	Ben Knopp	Canada	F										
2000	5	133	Petteri Nummelin	Finland	D	139	9	36	45	34					
2000	5	138	Scott Heffernan	Canada	D										
2000	5	150	Tyler Kolarik	United States	C										
2000	6	169	Shane Bendera	Canada	G										
2000	7	200	Janne Jokila	Finland	F										
2000	8	231	Pete Zingoni	United States	C										
2000	9	278	Martin Paroulek	Czech Republic	LW										
2000	9	286	Andrej Nedorost	Slovakia	C	28	2	3	5	12					
2000	9	292	Louis Mandeville	Canada	D										
2001	1	8	Pascal Leclaire	Canada	G	173	0	4	4	8	61	76	15	.904	2.89
2001	2	38	Tim Jackman	United States	RW	483	32	43	75	806					
2001	2	53	Kiel McLeod	Canada	RW										
2001	3	85	Aaron Johnson	Canada	D	291	17	45	62	227					
2001	3	87	Per Mars	Sweden	F										
2001	5	141	Cole Jarrett	Canada	D	1	0	0	0	0					
2001	6	173	Justin Aikins	Canada	RW										
2001	6	187	Artem Vostrikov	Russia	C										
2001	7	204	Raffaele Sannitz	Switzerland	C										
2001	8	236	Ryan Bowness	Canada	RW										
2001	8	242	Andrew Murray	Canada	C	221	24	16	40	36					
2002	1	1	Rick Nash	Canada	LW	1060	437	368	805	750					
2002	2	41	Joakim Lindstrom	Sweden	LW	150	19	24	43	58					
2002	3	65	Ole-Kristian Tollefsen	Norway	D	163	4	8	12	296					
2002	3	96	Jeff Genovy	United States	C										
2002	4	98	Ivan Tkachenko	Russia	RW										
2002	4	119	Jekabs Redlihs	Latvia	D										
2002	5	133	Lasse Pirjeta	Finland	LW	146	23	27	50	50					
2002	6	168	Tim Konsorada	Canada	RW										
2002	6	184	Jaroslav Balastik	Czech Republic	LW	74	13	11	24	30					
2002	7	199	Greg Mauldin	United States	RW	36	5	5	10	12					
2002	7	225	Steven Goertzen	Canada	RW	68	2	2	4	83					
2002	8	231	Jaroslav Kracik	Czech Republic	RW										
2002	9	263	Sergei Mozyakin	Russia	F										
2003	1	4	Nikolay Zherdev	Ukraine	RW	421	115	146	261	225					
2003	2	46	Dan Fritsche	United States	C	256	34	42	76	103					
2003	3	71	Dmitri Kosmachev	Russia	D										
2003	4	103	Kevin Jarman	Canada	F										
2003	4	104	Philippe Dupuis	Canada	C	116	6	12	18	62					
2003	5	138	Arsi Piispanen	Finland	F										
2003	6	168	Marc Methot	Canada	D	624	22	101	123	380					
2003	7	200	Alexander Guskov	Russia	D										
2003	8	233	Mathieu Gravel	Canada	RW										
2003	9	283	Trevor Hendrikx	Canada	D										
2004	1	8	Alexandre Picard	Canada	LW	67	0	2	2	58					
2004	2	46	Adam Pineault	United States	RW	3	0	0	0	0					
2004	2	59	Kyle Wharton	Canada	D										
2004	3	93	Dan LaCosta	Canada	G	4	0	0	0	0	0	2	0	.953	1.42
2004	3	96	Andrei Plekhanov	Russia	D										
2004	5	133	Petr Pohl	Czech Republic	RW										
2004	6	167	Robert Page	United States	D										
2004	6	190	Lennart Petrell	Finland	LW	95	7	11	18	49					
2004	7	198	Justin Vinneau	Canada	D										
2004	8	231	Brian McGuirk	United States	LW										
2004	8	233	Matt Greer	United States	F										
2004	9	271	Grant Clitsome	Canada	D	205	15	56	71	98					
2005	1	6	Gilbert Brule	Canada	C	299	43	52	95	156					
2005	2	55	Adam McQuaid	Canada	D	512	16	57	73	694					
2005	3	67	Kris Russell	Canada	D	912	48	206	254	271					
2005	4	101	Jared Boll	United States	RW	579	28	38	66	1298					
2005	5	131	Tomas Popperle	Czech Republic	G	2	0	0	0	0	0	0	0	.929	1.33
2005	6	177	Derek Reinhart	Canada	D										
2005	6	189	Kirill Starkov	Denmark	RW										
2005	7	201	Trevor Hendrikx	Canada	D										
2006	1	6	Derick Brassard	Canada	C	1013	215	330	545	465					
2006	3	69	Steve Mason	Canada	G	476	0	12	12	22	205	183	64	.911	2.70
2006	3	85	Tom Sestito	United States	LW	154	10	11	21	499					
2006	4	113	Ben Wright	Canada	D										
2006	5	129	Robert Nyholm	Finland	LW										
2006	5	136	Nick Sucharski	Canada	LW										
2006	5	142	Maxime Frechette	Canada	D										
2006	6	159	Jesse Dudas	Canada	D										
2006	7	189	Derek Dorsett	Canada	RW	515	51	76	127	1314					
2006	7	194	Matt Marquardt	Canada	LW										
2007	1	7	Jakub Voracek	Czech Republic	RW	1058	223	583	806	525					
2007	2	37	Stefan Legein	Canada	RW										
2007	2	53	Will Weber	United States	D										
2007	3	68	Jake Hansen	United States	F										
2007	4	94	Maxim Mayorov	Russia	LW	22	2	1	3	2					
2007	6	158	Allen York	Canada	G	11	0	0	0	0	3	2	0	.920	2.30
2007	7	211	Trent Vogelhuber	United States	RW										
2008	1	6	Nikita Filatov	Russia	LW	53	6	8	14	20					
2008	2	37	Cody Goloubef	Canada	D	160	3	22	25	76					
2008	4	107	Steven Delisle	Canada	D										
2008	4	118	Drew Olson	United States	D										
2008	5	127	Matt Calvert	Canada	LW	566	95	108	203	376					
2008	5	135	Tomas Kubalik	Czech Republic	RW	12	1	3	4	6					
2008	5	137	Brent Regner	Canada	D	7	0	0	0	4					
2008	6	157	Cam Atkinson	United States	RW	801	252	234	486	187					
2008	7	187	Sean Collins	Canada	C	21	0	3	3	10					
2009	1	21	John Moore	Canada	D	544	38	80	118	227					
2009	2	56	Kevin Lynch	United States	C										
2009	4	94	David Savard	Canada	D	840	54	183	237	457					
2009	5	137	Thomas Larkin	Italy	D										
2009	6	167	Anton Blomqvist	Sweden	D										
2009	7	197	Kyle Neuber	Canada	RW										
2010	1	4	Ryan Johansen	Canada	C	905	202	376	578	546					
2010	2	34	Dalton Smith	Canada	LW	1	0	0	0	2					
2010	2	55	Petr Straka	Czech Republic	LW	3	0	2	2	0					
2010	4	94	Brandon Archibald	United States	D										
2010	4	102	Mathieu Corbeil-Theriault	Canada	G										
2010	5	124	Austin Madaisky	Canada	D										
2010	6	154	Dalton Prout	Canada	D	264	7	31	38	321					
2010	7	184	Martin Ouellette	Canada	G										
2011	2	37	Boone Jenner	Canada	C	808	212	209	421	458					
2011	3	66	T. J. Tynan	United States	C	29	0	2	2	6					
2011	4	98	Mike Reilly	United States	D	460	19	114	133	190					
2011	5	128	Seth Ambroz	United States	LW										
2011	6	158	Lukas Sedlak	Czech Republic	C	192	18	17	35	68					
2011	7	188	Anton Forsberg	Sweden	G	226	0	2	2	6	90	93	19	.905	2.96
2012	1	2	Ryan Murray	Canada	D	445	15	116	131	118					
2012	2	31	Oscar Dansk	Sweden	G	6	0	0	0	0	4	1	0	.906	3.10
2012	3	62	Joonas Korpisalo	Finland	G	334	0	3	3	8	140	126	38	.900	3.06
2012	4	95	Josh Anderson	Canada	LW	688	160	113	273	641					
2012	6	152	Daniel Zaar	Sweden	RW										
2012	7	182	Gianluca Curcuruto	Canada	D										
2013	1	14	Alexander Wennberg	Sweden	C	869	119	306	425	187					
2013	1	19	Kerby Rychel	Canada	LW	43	3	11	14	19					
2013	1	27	Marko Dano	Slovakia	RW	141	19	26	45	49					
2013	2	50	Dillon Heatherington	Canada	D	23	0	2	2	33					
2013	3	89	Oliver Bjorkstrand	Denmark	RW	704	184	232	416	136					
2013	4	105	Nick Moutrey	Canada	C										
2013	6	165	Markus Soeberg	Norway	LW										
2013	7	195	Peter Quenneville	Canada	C										
2014	1	16	Sonny Milano	United States	LW	344	66	79	145	78					
2014	2	47	Ryan Collins	United States	D										
2014	3	76	Elvis Merzlikins	Latvia	G	274	0	7	7	24	108	111	38	.900	3.22
2014	3	77	Blake Siebenaler	United States	D										
2014	4	107	Julien Pelletier	Canada	LW										
2014	5	137	Tyler Bird	United States	RW										
2014	7	197	Olivier Leblanc	Canada	D										
2015	1	8	Zach Werenski	United States	D	642	135	330	465	164					
2015	1	29	Gabriel Carlsson	Sweden	D	81	3	15	18	22					
2015	2	38	Paul Bittner	United States	LW										
2015	2	58	Kevin Stenlund	Sweden	C	368	46	44	90	168					
2015	3	69	Keegan Kolesar	Canada	RW	439	44	76	120	323					
2015	5	129	Sam Ruopp	Canada	D										
2015	5	141	Veeti Vainio	Finland	D										
2015	6	159	Vladislav Gavrikov	Russia	D	517	43	127	170	244					
2015	7	189	Markus Nutivaara	Finland	D	275	17	54	71	42					
2016	1	3	Pierre-Luc Dubois	Canada	C	627	170	257	427	548					
2016	2	34	Andrew Peeke	United States	D	386	16	59	75	141					
2016	3	65	Vitalii Abramov	Russia	RW	5	1	0	1	2					
2016	6	155	Peter Thome	United States	G										
2016	7	185	Calvin Thurkauf	Switzerland	LW	3	0	0	0	0					
2017	2	45	Alexandre Texier	France	C	283	48	63	111	118					
2017	3	86	Daniil Tarasov	Russia	G	98	0	2	2	0	32	49	9	.897	3.30
2017	4	117	Emil Bemstrom	Sweden	C	242	34	41	75	30					
2017	5	148	Kale Howarth	United States	LW										
2017	6	170	Jonathan Davidsson	Sweden	RW	6	0	1	1	0					
2017	6	179	Carson Meyer	United States	RW	41	2	4	6	14					
2017	7	210	Robbie Stucker	United States	D										
2018	1	18	Liam Foudy	Canada	C	105	7	15	22	16					
2018	2	49	Kirill Marchenko	Russia	RW	292	102	106	208	82					
2018	3	80	Marcus Karlberg	Sweden	LW										
2018	6	159	Tim Berni	Switzerland	D	59	1	2	3	34					
2018	6	173	Veini Vehvilainen	Finland	G	1	0	0	0	0	0	0	0	.750	5.63
2018	7	205	Trey Fix-Wolansky	Canada	RW	26	4	2	6	2					
2019	4	104	Eric Hjorth	Sweden	D										
2019	4	114	Dmitri Voronkov	Russia	LW	211	58	55	113	166					
2019	7	212	Tyler Angle	Canada	C	4	1	0	1	0					
2020	1	21	Egor Chinakhov	Russia	RW	247	55	58	113	46					
2020	3	78	Samuel Knazko	Slovakia	D	2	0	0	0	0					
2020	4	114	Mikael Pyyhtia	Finland	LW	71	5	6	11	8					
2020	5	145	Ole Julian Bjørgvik Holm	Norway	D										
2020	6	176	Samuel Johannesson	Sweden	D										
2021	1	5	Kent Johnson	Canada	C	274	53	85	138	62					
2021	1	12	Cole Sillinger	Canada	C	367	51	89	140	177					
2021	1	25	Corson Ceulemans	Canada	D										
2021	3	69	Stanislav Svozil	Czech Republic	D	2	0	1	1	2					
2021	4	101	Guillaume Richard	Canada	D										
2021	5	132	Nikolai Makarov	Russia	D										
2021	5	133	James Malatesta	Canada	C	13	2	2	4	5					
2021	6	165	Ben Boyd	Canada	C										
2021	7	197	Martin Rysavy	Czech Republic	LW										
2022	1	6	David Jiricek	Czech Republic	D	85	2	11	13	46					
2022	1	12	Denton Mateychuk	Canada	D	120	17	27	44	28					
2022	2	44	Luca Del Bel Belluz	Canada	C	30	3	7	10	4					
2022	3	96	Jordan Dumais	Canada	RW										
2022	4	109	Kirill Dolzhenkov	Russia	RW										
2022	5	138	Sergei Ivanov	Russia	G										
2022	7	203	James Fisher	United States	RW										
2023	1	3	Adam Fantilli	Canada	C	213	67	73	140	72					
2023	2	34	Gavin Brindley	United States	C	57	6	7	13	8					
2023	3	66	William Whitelaw	United States	RW										
2023	4	98	Andrew Strathmann	United States	D										
2023	4	114	Luca Pinelli	Canada	C	3	0	0	0	0					
2023	5	156	Melvin Strahl	Sweden	G										
2023	7	194	Oiva Keskinen	Finland	C										
2023	7	224	Tyler Peddle	Canada	LW										
2024	1	4	Cayden Lindstrom	Canada	C										
2024	2	34	Charlie Elick	Canada	D										
2024	2	60	Evan Gardner	Canada	G										
2024	3	86	Luca Marrelli	Canada	D										
2024	4	101	Tanner Henricks	United States	D										
2024	6	165	Luke Ashton	Canada	D										
2025	1	14	Jackson Smith	Canada	D										
2025	1	20	Pyotr Andreyanov	Russia	G										
2025	3	76	Malte Vass	Sweden	D										
2025	5	160	Owen Griffin	Canada	C										
2025	6	173	Victor Hedin Raftheim	Sweden	D										
2025	7	198	Jérémy Loranger	Canada	C										
2026	1	14	Oscar Hemming	Finland	LW										
2026	3	94	Alessandro Di Iorio	Canada	C										
2026	4	121	Evan Jardine	United States	LW										
2026	5	142	Parker Snell	Canada	G										
2026	6	182	Anttoni Uronen	Finland	C										
2026	6	185	Jonas Woo	Canada	D										
2026	7	206	Filip Novák	Czech Republic	LW										

== See also ==
- 2000 NHL expansion draft
