= CHL Top Draft Prospect Award =

Canadian Hockey League award

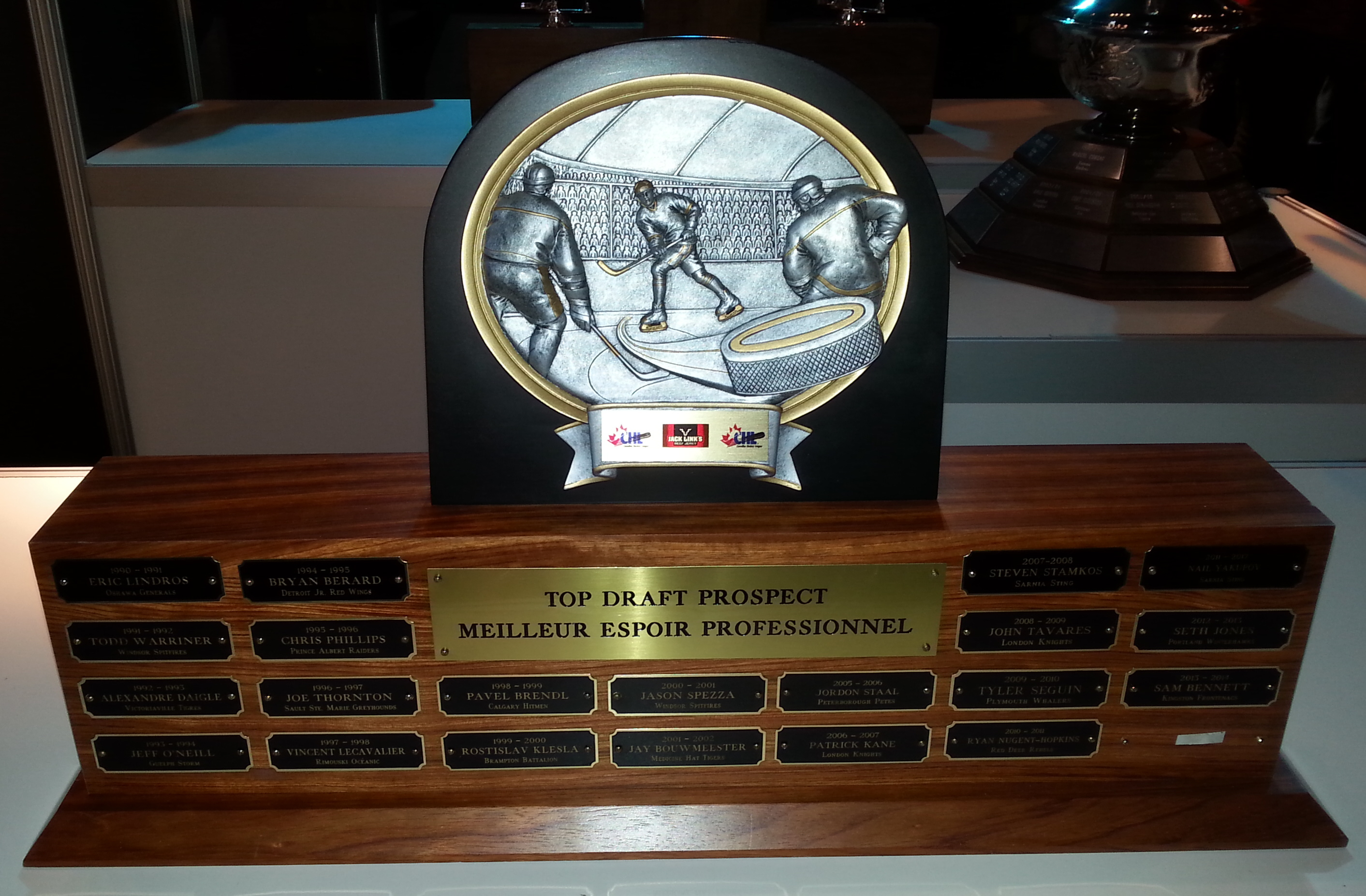
- Sport: Ice hockey
- Awarded for: Annually to the top eligible Canadian Hockey League prospect for the NHL Entry Draft

History
- First award: 1991
- First winner: Eric Lindros
- Most recent: Chase Reid

The CHL Top Draft Prospect Award is given out every year to the top eligible prospect player in the Canadian Hockey League for the annual NHL entry draft. The award was first given in 1991, but not awarded from 2003 to 2005. The Quebec Maritimes Junior Hockey League (QMJHL) awards the equivalent Michael Bossy Trophy, awarded to the top draft prospect in its league. There is no equivalent award in the Ontario Hockey League (OHL) or Western Hockey League (WHL).

== Winners ==
List of winners of the CHL Top Draft Prospect Award.

| Season | Winner | Team | League | NHL entry draft |
|---|---|---|---|---|
| 1990–91 | Eric Lindros | Oshawa Generals | OHL | 1st overall |
| 1991–92 | Todd Warriner | Windsor Spitfires | OHL | 4th overall |
| 1992–93 | Alexandre Daigle | Victoriaville Tigres | QMJHL | 1st overall |
| 1993–94 | Jeff O'Neill | Guelph Storm | OHL | 5th overall |
| 1994–95 | Bryan Berard | Detroit Junior Red Wings | OHL | 1st overall |
| 1995–96 | Chris Phillips | Prince Albert Raiders | WHL | 1st overall |
| 1996–97 | Joe Thornton | Sault Ste. Marie Greyhounds | OHL | 1st overall |
| 1997–98 | Vincent Lecavalier | Rimouski Océanic | QMJHL | 1st overall |
| 1998–99 | Pavel Brendl | Calgary Hitmen | WHL | 4th overall |
| 1999–2000 | Rostislav Klesla | Brampton Battalion | OHL | 4th overall |
| 2000–01 | Jason Spezza | Windsor Spitfires | OHL | 2nd overall |
| 2001–02 | Jay Bouwmeester | Medicine Hat Tigers | WHL | 3rd overall |
Award was not handed out from 2003 to 2005
| 2005–06 | Jordan Staal | Peterborough Petes | OHL | 2nd overall |
| 2006–07 | Patrick Kane | London Knights | OHL | 1st overall |
| 2007–08 | Steven Stamkos | Sarnia Sting | OHL | 1st overall |
| 2008–09 | John Tavares | London Knights | OHL | 1st overall |
| 2009–10 | Tyler Seguin | Plymouth Whalers | OHL | 2nd overall |
| 2010–11 | Ryan Nugent-Hopkins | Red Deer Rebels | WHL | 1st overall |
| 2011–12 | Nail Yakupov | Sarnia Sting | OHL | 1st overall |
| 2012–13 | Seth Jones | Portland Winterhawks | WHL | 4th overall |
| 2013–14 | Sam Bennett | Kingston Frontenacs | OHL | 4th overall |
| 2014–15 | Connor McDavid | Erie Otters | OHL | 1st overall |
| 2015–16 | Pierre-Luc Dubois | Cape Breton Screaming Eagles | QMJHL | 3rd overall |
| 2016–17 | Nolan Patrick | Brandon Wheat Kings | WHL | 2nd overall |
| 2017–18 | Andrei Svechnikov | Barrie Colts | OHL | 2nd overall |
| 2018–19 | Bowen Byram | Vancouver Giants | WHL | 4th overall |
| 2019–20 | Alexis Lafrenière | Rimouski Océanic | QMJHL | 1st overall |
| 2020–21 | Not awarded due to COVID-19 pandemic | | | |
| 2021–22 | Shane Wright | Kingston Frontenacs | OHL | 4th overall |
| 2022–23 | Connor Bedard | Regina Pats | WHL | 1st overall |
| 2023–24 | Cayden Lindstrom | Medicine Hat Tigers | WHL | 4th overall |
| 2024–25 | Matthew Schaefer | Erie Otters | OHL | 1st overall |
| 2025–26 | Chase Reid | Sault Ste. Marie Greyhounds | OHL | 7th overall |

== See also ==
- List of Canadian Hockey League awards
