= Jackson Smith =

Jackson Smith may refer to:

- Jackson Smith (footballer)
- Jackson Smith (ice hockey)
- Jackson Smith, musician son of Patti Smith
