= Jokela (disambiguation) =

Jokela is a town in Tuusula, Finland.

Jokela may refer to:

- Jokela railway station
- Jokela (surname), a common Finnish surname
- Late-onset spinal motor neuronopathy, or Jokela-type spinal muscular atrophy
