= Pyotr Andreyanov =

Russian ice hockey player (born 2007)

- Born: 22 January 2007 (age 19) Volsk, Saratov Oblast, Russia
- Height: 6 ft 2 in (188 cm)
- Weight: 207 lb (94 kg; 14 st 11 lb)
- Position: Goaltender
- Catches: Left
- KHL team (P) Cur. team: CSKA Moscow; HC Sochi (KHL)
- NHL draft: 20th overall, 2025; Columbus Blue Jackets
- Playing career: 2025–present

Pyotr Andreyanov (born 22 January 2007) is a Russian professional ice hockey goaltender for HC Sochi of the Kontinental Hockey League (KHL) while on loan from HC CSKA Moscow of the KHL. He was drafted 20th overall by the Columbus Blue Jackets in the 2025 NHL entry draft.

== Playing career ==
During the 2024–25 season, Andreyanov played for the Krasnaya Armiya of the MHL, where he posted a 23–6–6 record, with 1.75 goals against average (GAA), .942 save percentage and three shutouts. He ranked second in the league in save percentage and fourth in wins and GAA. Entering the 2025 NHL entry draft, he was ranked the No. 1 international goaltender by NHL Central Scouting. On 27 June 2025, he was drafted 20th overall by the Columbus Blue Jackets in the NHL draft.

On 10 July 2025, Andreyanov having impressed through the junior ranks in the MHL, was re-signed to a five year contract extension with CSKA Moscow. Having played in the Supreme Hockey League (VHL), Andreyanov was loaned by CSKA to fellow KHL club, HC Sochi, for the 2026–27 season on 3 September 2026.

== Career statistics ==
			Regular season									Playoffs
Season	Team	League	GP	W	L	OTL	MIN	GA	SO	GAA	SV%	GP	W	L	MIN	GA	SO	GAA	SV%
2023–24	Krasnaya Armiya	MHL	20	9	8	0	1,126	57	1	3.04	.916	—	—	—	—	—	—	—	—
2024–25	Krasnaya Armiya	MHL	37	23	6	6	2,194	64	3	1.75	.942	3	0	3	176	10	0	3.40	.909
2025–26	Krasnaya Armiya	MHL	26	13	8	3	1,462	63	3	2.59	.919	7	2	4	379	17	0	2.69	.923
2025–26	Zvezda Moscow	VHL	13	4	8	0	733	26	1	2.13	.918	—	—	—	—	—	—	—	—
VHL totals			13	4	8	0	733	26	1	2.13	.918	—	—	—	—	—	—	—	—

Awards and achievements
Preceded by Jackson Smith	Columbus Blue Jackets first-round draft pick 2025	Succeeded by Oscar Hemming
