= Oscar Hemming =

Finnish ice hockey player (born 2008)

- Born: 13 August 2008 (age 18) Vaasa, Finland
- Height: 6 ft 4 in (193 cm)
- Weight: 193 lb (88 kg; 13 st 11 lb)
- Position: Forward
- Shoots: Left
- NCAA team: Boston College Eagles
- NHL draft: 14th overall, 2026; Columbus Blue Jackets

Oscar Hemming (born 13 August 2008) is a Finnish college ice hockey forward for the Boston College Eagles. He was drafted 14th overall by the Columbus Blue Jackets in the 2026 NHL entry draft.

== Playing career ==
Hemming was a member of the club Kiekko-Espoo from 2022 to 2025, playing with the U16 team and later the U18 and U20 teams. He scored 32 points in 30 games with the U16 team during the 2022–23 season, followed by 10 points in 8 games in 2023–24. He tallied 63 points in 31 games with the U18 program in 2023–24 while also appearing in 18 games for the U20 team, scoring 10 points.

Hemming was selected in the 2025 CHL Import Draft by the Kitchener Rangers of the Ontario Hockey League (OHL) and planned to play with them in the 2025–26 season. His family terminated his contract with Kiekko-Espoo in July 2025 and "felt they had a legal right to do so under Finnish law" due to Hemming being a minor. However, Kiekko-Espoo disputed the termination of the contract and this led to him being unable to play for the Rangers due to International Ice Hockey Federation (IIHF) rules, as being released by his club was necessary for the IIHF to grant his transfer to a new club falling under Hockey Canada. Hemming later signed to play with the Sherwood Park Crusaders, as they played in the independent British Columbia Hockey League, but was told by the IIHF that playing for them would lead to a three-year sanction from international play. He thus decided not to play for the Crusaders.

In December 2025, it was announced that Hemming was joining the Boston College Eagles of the NCAA until the end of the season. In his 12th game with the team, he scored his first goal, a game-winner in the final minute against Merrimack. In 19 games with the Eagles, he posted one goal and seven assists for eight points.

Hemming was regarded as a top prospect eligible for the 2026 NHL entry draft. He was selected by the Columbus Blue Jackets in the first round, 14th overall.

== International play ==
Hemming played for a Finland U14 team in 2021–22, tallying 15 points in seven games. He later competed with the national U17 team and scored nine points in nine games in 2024–25. Hemming competed for Finland at the 2025 Hlinka Gretzky Cup, scoring six points in five games.

== Personal life ==
Hemming was born on 13 August 2008 in Vaasa, Finland, and later moved south. His brother, Emil, was a first-round pick in the 2024 NHL entry draft.

Awards and achievements
Preceded by Pyotr Andreyanov	Columbus Blue Jackets first-round draft pick 2026	Succeeded by Incumbent
