= Cayden Lindstrom =

Canadian ice hockey player (born 2006)

- Born: February 3, 2006 (age 20) Dawson Creek, British Columbia, Canada
- Height: 6 ft 3 in (191 cm)
- Weight: 209 lb (95 kg; 14 st 13 lb)
- Position: Forward
- Shoots: Left
- NCAA team: Michigan State University
- NHL draft: 4th overall, 2024; Columbus Blue Jackets

Cayden Lindstrom (born February 3, 2006) is a Canadian college ice hockey player who is a forward for Michigan State University of the National Collegiate Athletic Association (NCAA). He was drafted fourth overall by the Columbus Blue Jackets in the 2024 NHL entry draft.

== Early life ==
Lindstrom is from Chetwynd, British Columbia. He is Black and a member of the Driftpile Cree Nation. He and his three younger sisters were raised by a single mother, who worked as a medical assistant. Throughout his childhood, he was very close with his mother and grandparents.

Lindstrom grew up as a multi-sport athlete, also participating in track and field, baseball, and soccer. When he was 13 years old, high-level play in both baseball and hockey forced him to choose between the two. Lindstrom was playing midget A hockey in Fort St. John when he was first scouted by his agent. At age 14, he moved move 1,200 kilometres (750 mi) south to Delta and joined the Delta Hockey Academy.

== Playing career ==
While playing in Delta, Lindstrom was selected 54th overall in the 2021 Western Hockey League (WHL) draft by the Medicine Hat Tigers. He signed with the Tigers and made his WHL debut on December 30, 2021, in a 3–2 victory over the Calgary Hitmen.

In his first full WHL season in 2022–23, Lindstrom was shifted between wing and centre, and at points had been a healthy scratch. At the season's end, he had recorded 19 goals and 42 points across 61 games, respectable for a 16-year-old. He was named rookie of the year for the WHL Central Division, and was a finalist for the Jim Piggott Memorial Trophy for WHL rookie of the year.

Beginning the 2023–24 season on a torrid pace, Lindstrom recorded nine points in three preseason games followed by ten goals and fifteen points in the first twelve games of the regular season. His stellar play through the early stages of the season led to his receiving an 'A' rating from NHL Central Scouting in their October list. Although this was somewhat of a surprise at the time, he continued to produce points at an elite rate, and his draft stock continued to rise. Entering the Christmas break and riding a 12-game point-scoring streak that saw him score 13 goals and 21 points, he sustained injuries to his back and hand, derailing what was on pace to be a 55-goal, 100-point season. Although he was one of 40 draft-eligible prospects chosen to compete at the 2024 CHL/NHL Top Prospects Game, he was not able to participate due to recovery from his injuries, which included hand surgery. He finished the year with 27 goals and 46 points in 32 games, the highest points per game rate by a Medicine Hat player since Joffrey Lupul 22 years earlier, and would go on to win the CHL Top Draft Prospect Award as the best draft-eligible player in the three CHL component leagues.

Lindstrom returned from injury in the first round of the playoffs against the Red Deer Rebels, but was not fully recovered and did not perform nearly to his previous standard. In four playoff games before the Rebels eliminated the Tigers, he scored just two points and logged fourteen penalty minutes. Entering the 2024 NHL entry draft, Lindstrom was lauded for his size, athleticism, skating, and puckhandling, but was regarded as unpolished, particularly in his decision-making. His final ranking from Central Scouting was third among North American skaters, and he would see his name called fourth overall by the Columbus Blue Jackets.

Lindstrom spent the summer and autumn of 2024 attempting to rehabilitate his back, but eventually opted for a surgical microdiscectomy, which was performed that November. Post-surgery, he was required to avoid training for a month, before returning to the ice. As a result, he ultimately missed the entire 2024–25 regular season with the Tigers, as well as most of the postseason. However, he was able to rejoin the team for the first game of the WHL Finals against the Spokane Chiefs, recording an assist in the game. He scored a goal in the second game on May 12, his first in 411 days. After taking a hard hit in Game 3, he missed Game 4, but was able to return to the roster thereafter. The Tigers defeated the Chiefs in five games, claiming the Ed Chynoweth Cup as WHL champions. Lindstrom and the Tigers then participated in the 2025 Memorial Cup, where they were defeated in the tournament final by the OHL champion London Knights.

== International play ==
Medal record

Representing Canada

Men's ice hockey

Hlinka Gretzky Cup
Gold medal – first place	2023 Czechia/Slovakia	

At the 2022 World U-17 Hockey Challenge, Lindstrom played for Team Canada White, recording two goals and four points in six games.

Lindstrom represented Canada at the 2023 Hlinka Gretzky Cup, recording two goals and five points in five games and winning a gold medal.

== Career statistics ==
=== Regular season and playoffs ===
			Regular season					Playoffs
Season	Team	League	GP	G	A	Pts	PIM	GP	G	A	Pts	PIM
2021–22	Medicine Hat Tigers	WHL	6	0	0	0	0	—	—	—	—	—
2022–23	Medicine Hat Tigers	WHL	61	19	23	42	36	4	0	1	1	6
2023–24	Medicine Hat Tigers	WHL	32	27	19	46	66	4	1	1	2	14
2024–25	Medicine Hat Tigers	WHL	—	—	—	—	—	4	2	2	4	6
2025–26	Michigan State University	B1G	31	3	7	10	94	—	—	—	—	—
WHL totals			99	46	42	88	102	12	3	4	7	26

=== International ===
Year	Team	Event	Result	GP	G	A	Pts	PIM
2022	Canada White	U17	6th	6	2	2	4	8
2023	Canada	HG18	1st place, gold medalist(s)	5	2	1	3	12
Junior totals				11	4	3	7	20

== Awards and honours ==
Award	Year	Ref
CHL
CHL Top Draft Prospect Award	2024	
WHL
Ed Chynoweth Cup champion	2025	

Awards and achievements
Preceded by Adam Fantilli	Columbus Blue Jackets first-round draft pick 2024	Succeeded by Jackson Smith
