= Pascal Leclaire =

Canadian ice hockey player (born 1982)

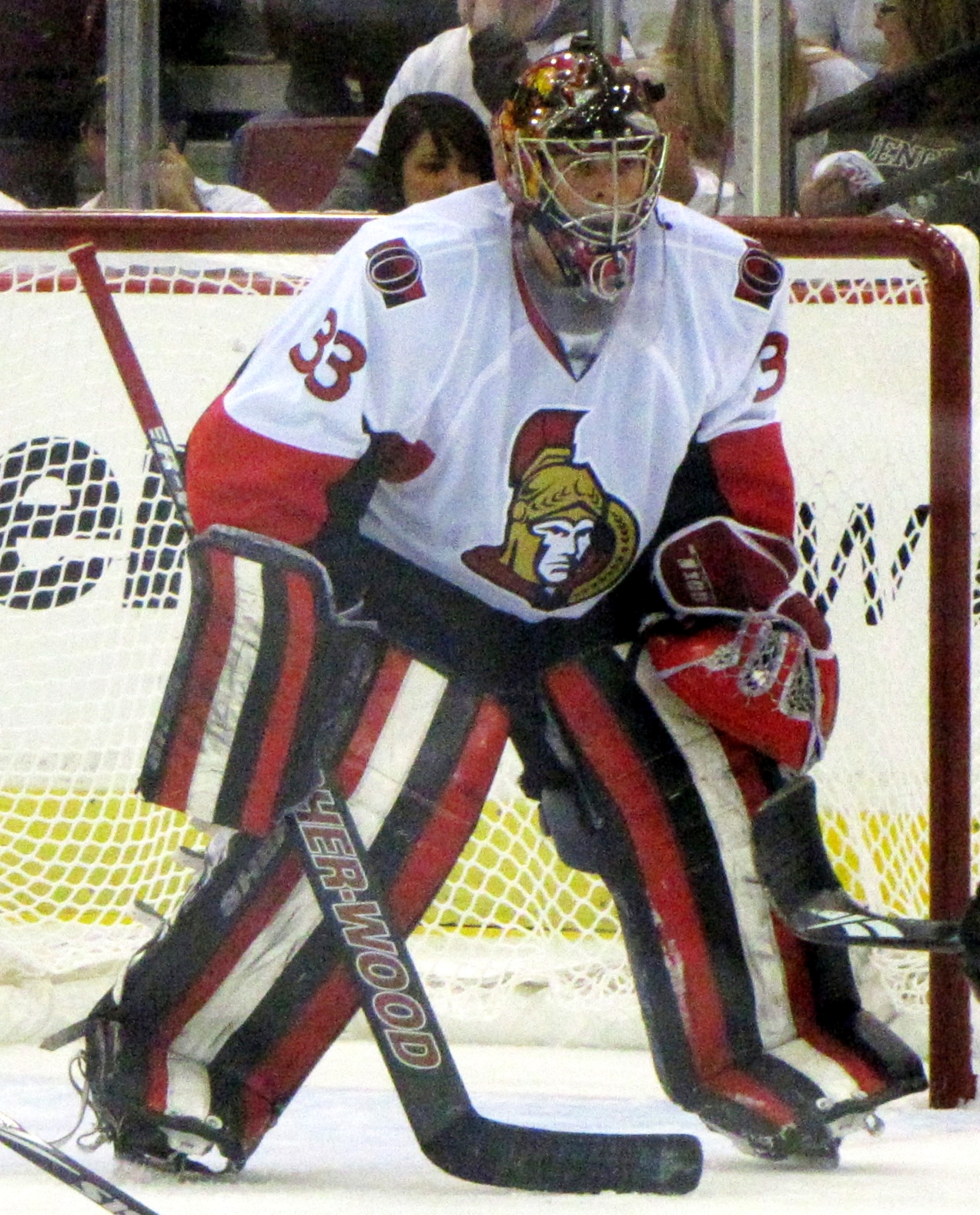
- Leclaire with the Ottawa Senators in 2010
- Born: November 7, 1982 (age 43) Repentigny, Quebec, Canada
- Height: 6 ft 2 in (188 cm)
- Weight: 202 lb (92 kg; 14 st 6 lb)
- Position: Goaltender
- Caught: Left
- Played for: Columbus Blue Jackets; Ottawa Senators
- National team: Canada
- NHL draft: 8th overall, 2001; Columbus Blue Jackets
- Playing career: 2002–2010

Pascal Leclaire (born November 7, 1982) is a Canadian former professional ice hockey goaltender. Leclaire was selected in the first round (eighth overall) of the 2001 NHL entry draft by the Columbus Blue Jackets and played in the Blue Jackets' organization for seven seasons. He was traded to the Ottawa Senators in 2009 and played in 48 regular season games with Ottawa over two seasons before retiring. Internationally, he has represented Canada on the national junior and men's teams.

== Playing career ==
As a youth, Leclaire played in the 1996 Quebec International Pee-Wee Hockey Tournament with the Rive-Nord Elites minor ice hockey team.

Leclaire played junior ice hockey in the Quebec Major Junior Hockey League (QMJHL) with the Halifax Mooseheads and the Montreal Rocket between 1998 and 2002. Leclaire was the first goaltender selected in the 2001 NHL entry draft, chosen eighth overall by the Columbus Blue Jackets. He subsequently bounced back and forth between Columbus and their American Hockey League (AHL) affiliate, the Syracuse Crunch, from 2002 to 2005 before finally sticking with the Blue Jackets for good in 2006, serving as a backup to Marc Denis.

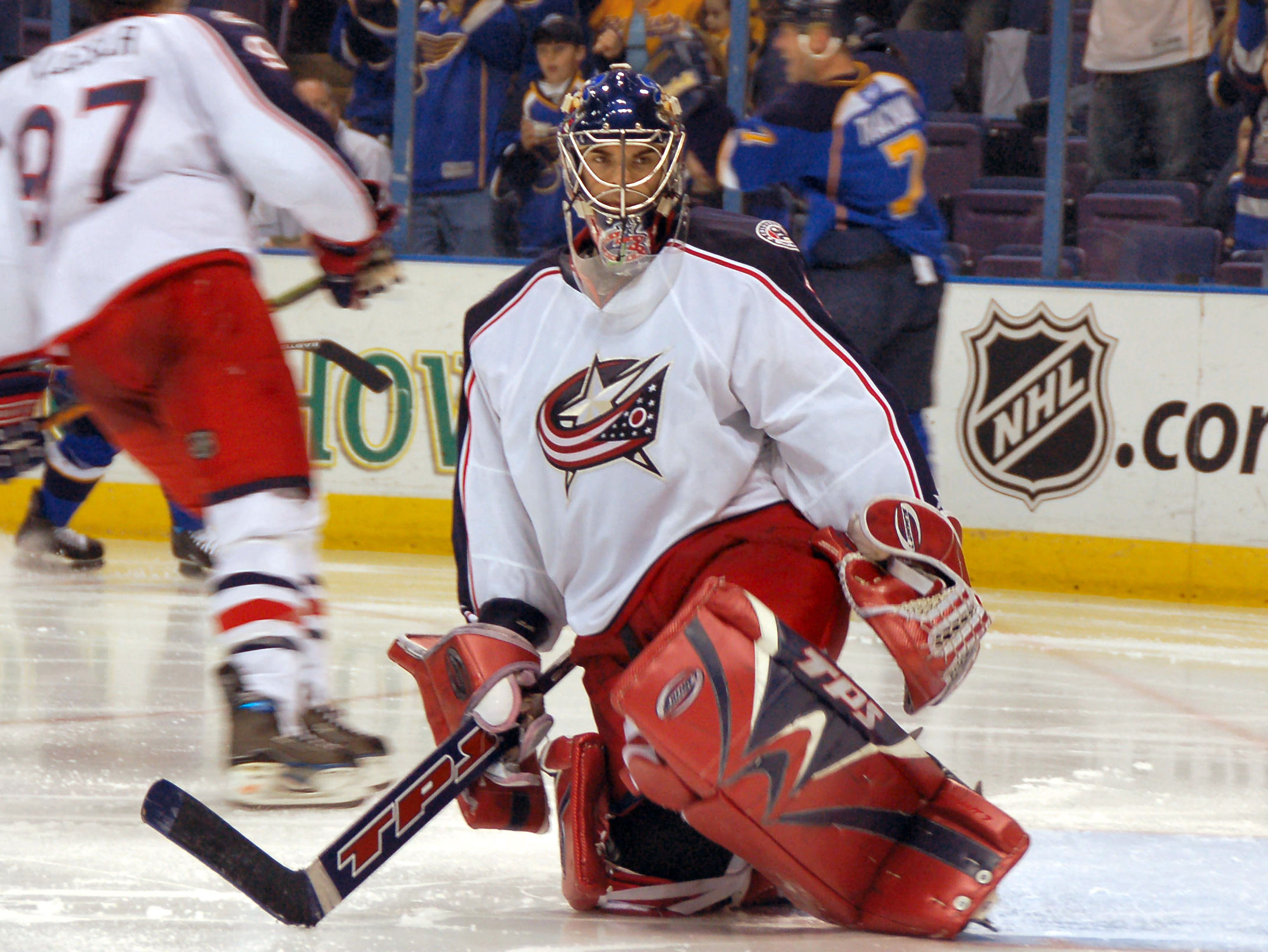
Leclaire with the Blue Jackets in 2008

On June 30, 2006, Denis was traded to the Tampa Bay Lightning and Leclaire was promoted to starting goaltender. However, during the 2006–07 season, Leclaire suffered from a leg injury and backup goaltender Fredrik Norrena took over and eventually played in 55 games out of 82. In 2007–08, Leclaire had an outstanding season and regained the starting goaltender job. He set new team records with nine shutouts (second in the league only to Henrik Lundqvist), ranked second in the NHL in goals against average, and third in save percentage. Leclaire finished second in fan voting among Western Conference goaltenders for the 2008 NHL All-Star Game, but was not named to the final team.

In the 2008–09 season, Leclaire injured his ankle, sidelining him for the season and the Blue Jackets promoted rookie Steve Mason. Mason's play was outstanding, leading the Western Conference in several categories. In a playoff race, the Blue Jackets traded Leclaire to the Ottawa Senators, along with a 2009 second-round pick in exchange for Antoine Vermette on March 4, 2009. As expected, Leclaire assumed the role of starting goaltender with the Senators in 2009–10, once he had fully recovered from ankle surgery. However, Leclaire finished the season backing up Brian Elliott in the Ottawa net, due to inconsistent play and injuries, including a broken cheekbone suffered from being hit by an errant puck while sitting on the bench during a game. The inconsistency and injuries worsened considerably in 2010–11 with Leclaire playing 14 NHL games and the Senators finishing the year with a top 2 tandem of goaltenders other than those who started the season with the team. During the season he underwent hip surgery.

As the 2011–12 NHL season began, Leclaire remained unsigned as an unrestricted free agent. He would ultimately sit out the entire season, unable to come to terms on a contract with any team.

On November 12, 2012, Leclaire announced his retirement from ice hockey. He had undergone three operations on his right hip, from which he was not able to recover.

On October 5, 2005, Leclaire allowed the first career NHL goal scored by Alexander Ovechkin who would eventually have the record for the most goals in NHL history.

== International play ==
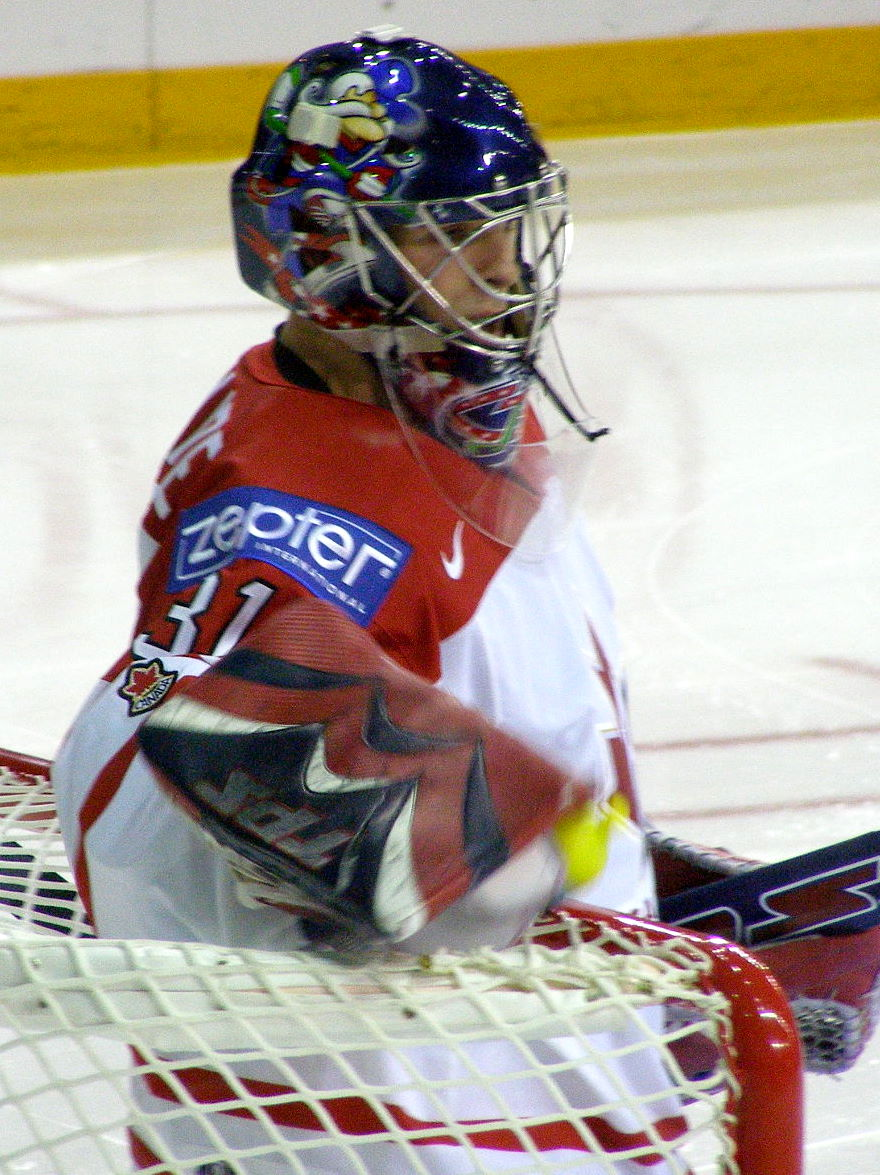
- Leclaire with Team Canada at the 2008 IIHF World Championships

Medal record

Representing Canada

IIHF World Championship
Silver medal – second place	2008 Canada	

World Junior Championships
Silver medal – second place	2002 Czech Republic	

Leclaire competed in the 2002 World Junior Ice Hockey Championships with Canada. He assumed the starting position, recording a 1.80 GAA and two shutouts over five games. Six years later, he joined Canada's men's team at the 2008 IIHF World Championship in Halifax, Nova Scotia. He played in four games, going undefeated while recording a 2.00 GAA. Canada lost in the gold medal game to Russia.

== Career statistics ==
=== Regular season and playoffs ===
			Regular season										Playoffs
Season	Team	League	GP	W	L	T	OTL	MIN	GA	SO	GAA	SV%	GP	W	L	MIN	GA	SO	GAA	SV%
1997–98	Cap-de-la-Madeleine Estacades	QMAAA	26	6	17	3	—	1580	127	0	4.90	—	—	—	—	—	—	—	—	—
1998–99	Halifax Mooseheads	QMJHL	33	19	11	1	—	1828	96	2	3.15	.900	1	0	0	17	2	0	7.06	.778
1999–00	Halifax Mooseheads	QMJHL	31	16	8	4	—	1729	103	1	3.57	.893	5	1	2	198	12	0	3.64	.887
2000–01	Halifax Mooseheads	QMJHL	33	14	16	5	—	2111	126	1	3.58	.891	2	0	2	109	10	0	5.50	.867
2001–02	Montreal Rocket	QMJHL	45	15	23	4	—	2513	138	1	3.29	.895	7	3	4	441	15	0	2.04	.932
2002–03	Syracuse Crunch	AHL	36	8	21	3	—	1886	112	0	3.56	.890	—	—	—	—	—	—	—	—
2003–04	Syracuse Crunch	AHL	44	21	16	3	—	2447	125	2	3.06	.915	3	1	2	142	12	0	5.07	.864
2003–04	Columbus Blue Jackets	NHL	2	0	2	0	—	119	7	0	3.53	.899	—	—	—	—	—	—	—	—
2004–05	Syracuse Crunch	AHL	14	5	6	—	3	844	33	2	2.34	.926	5	2	3	288	11	1	2.29	.939
2005–06	Syracuse Crunch	AHL	7	3	3	—	0	340	16	1	2.82	.920	5	2	3	288	11	1	2.29	.939
2005–06	Columbus Blue Jackets	NHL	33	11	15	—	3	1804	97	0	3.23	.911	—	—	—	—	—	—	—	—
2006–07	Columbus Blue Jackets	NHL	24	6	15	—	2	1315	65	1	2.97	.897	—	—	—	—	—	—	—	—
2007–08	Columbus Blue Jackets	NHL	54	24	17	—	6	2986	112	9	2.25	.919	—	—	—	—	—	—	—	—
2008–09	Columbus Blue Jackets	NHL	12	4	6	—	1	674	43	0	3.83	.867	—	—	—	—	—	—	—	—
2009–10	Ottawa Senators	NHL	34	12	14	—	2	1745	93	0	3.20	.887	3	1	2	211	10	0	2.84	.920
2010–11	Ottawa Senators	NHL	14	4	7	—	1	763	36	0	2.83	.908	—	—	—	—	—	—	—	—
2010–11	Binghamton Senators	AHL	1	0	0	—	1	65	2	0	1.85	.938	—	—	—	—	—	—	—	—
NHL totals			173	61	76	0	15	9406	453	10	2.89	.904	3	1	2	211	10	0	2.84	.920

=== International ===
Year	Team	Event	GP	W	L	T	MIN	GA	SO	GAA	SV%
2002	Canada	WJC	5	4	1	0	299	9	2	1.80	.937
2008	Canada	WC	4	4	0	—	240	8	1	2.00	.925

Awards and achievements
Preceded by Rostislav Klesla	Columbus Blue Jackets first-round draft pick 2001	Succeeded by Rick Nash
