= Jarmo Jokila =

Finnish ice hockey player

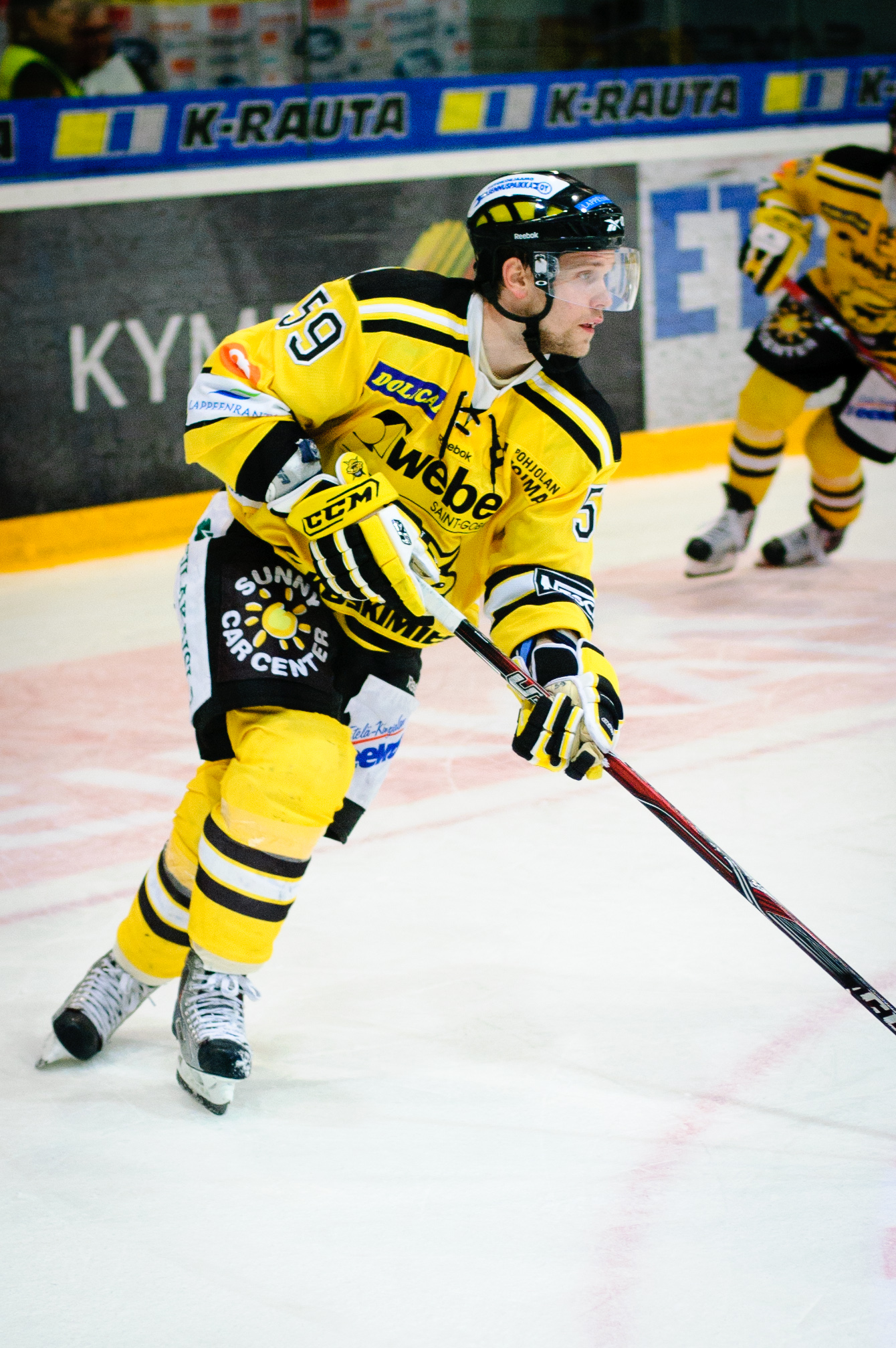
- Jarmo Jokila
- Born: February 13, 1986 (age 39); Lemu, Finland
- Height: 175 cm (5 ft 9 in)
- Weight: 86 kg (190 lb; 13 st 8 lb)
- Position: Left wing
- Shot: Left
- 2. Div team; Former teams: HC Vantaa; HC TPS; SaiPa; HC '05 Banská Bystrica; HK Nitra; Stjernen Hockey; SønderjyskE Ishockey; Podhale Nowy Targ; MAC Budapest
- Playing career: 2004–2023

Jarmo Jokila (born February 13, 1986, in Lemu) is a Finnish ice hockey player who currently plays for Podhale Nowy Targ in the Polska Hokej Liga, the top-level ice hockey league in Poland.

His brother Janne is also a professional ice hockey player, drafted by NHL team Columbus Blue Jackets in 2000 and currently playing for Milton Keynes Lightning in the UK.

== Career statistics ==
			Regular season					Playoffs
Season	Team	League	GP	G	A	Pts	PIM	GP	G	A	Pts	PIM
2000–01	HC TPS U16	U16 SM-sarja	11	6	7	13	35	6	2	1	3	14
2001–02	HC TPS U16	U16 SM-sarja	13	16	15	31	37	7	7	8	15	33
2001–02	HC TPS U18	U18 SM-sarja	2	0	0	0	2	—	—	—	—	—
2002–03	HC TPS U18	U18 SM-sarja	10	6	5	11	4	7	5	1	6	4
2002–03	HC TPS U20	U20 SM-liiga	21	5	5	10	4	1	0	0	0	0
2003–04	HC TPS U18	U18 SM-sarja	—	—	—	—	—	4	4	8	12	2
2003–04	HC TPS U20	U20 SM-liiga	35	6	19	25	18	4	1	1	2	2
2004–05	HC TPS U20	U20 SM-liiga	30	13	17	30	12	—	—	—	—	—
2004–05	HC TPS	SM-liiga	9	1	0	1	0	—	—	—	—	—
2004–05	TUTO Hockey	Mestis	10	4	1	5	8	6	1	2	3	6
2005–06	HC TPS U20	U20 SM-liiga	8	2	1	3	10	—	—	—	—	—
2005–06	HC TPS	SM-liiga	4	0	0	0	0	—	—	—	—	—
2005–06	Suomi U20	Mestis	7	5	1	6	4	—	—	—	—	—
2005–06	TuTo U20	U20 I-Divisioona	7	1	2	3	4	—	—	—	—	—
2005–06	TUTO Hockey	Mestis	35	6	10	16	12	7	0	0	0	2
2006–07	Omaha Lancers	USHL	58	19	22	41	56	5	2	2	4	10
2007–08	Kiekko-Vantaa	Mestis	42	21	20	41	116	—	—	—	—	—
2008–09	TUTO Hockey	Mestis	44	20	37	57	40	10	3	7	10	12
2009–10	SaiPa	SM-liiga	18	5	5	10	6	—	—	—	—	—
2009–10	Mikkelin Jukurit	Mestis	2	0	2	2	2	—	—	—	—	—
2010–11	SaiPa	SM-liiga	34	5	2	7	16	—	—	—	—	—
2010–11	Mikkelin Jukurit	Mestis	8	3	1	4	8	—	—	—	—	—
2011–12	HC Banska Bystrica	Slovak	52	16	23	39	76	5	1	0	1	4
2012–13	HK Nitra	Slovak	49	10	22	32	40	9	1	2	3	8
2013–14	LeKi	Mestis	4	2	0	2	2	—	—	—	—	—
2013–14	Kiekko-Vantaa	Mestis	17	3	13	16	14	—	—	—	—	—
2013–14	Stjernen Hockey	Norway	11	5	2	7	26	—	—	—	—	—
2014–15	Kiekko-Vantaa	Mestis	4	3	4	7	4	—	—	—	—	—
2014–15	Hudiksvalls HC	Hockeyettan	27	8	24	32	34	—	—	—	—	—
2014–15	SønderjyskE Ishockey	Denmark	5	1	2	3	2	14	2	4	6	4
2015–16	Podhale Nowy Targ	Poland	41	18	38	56	54	8	2	4	6	2
2016–17	Podhale Nowy Targ	Poland	38	22	31	53	75	9	1	3	4	18
2017–18	MAC Budapest	Erste Liga	11	0	7	7	0	—	—	—	—	—
2017–18	TUTO Hockey	Mestis	7	3	3	6	2	—	—	—	—	—
2018–19	Porvoo Hunters	Suomi-sarja	16	7	15	22	14	—	—	—	—	—
2019–20	HC Vantaa	2. Divisioona	3	1	4	5	2	—	—	—	—	—
2020–21	KHT	2. Divisioona	7	7	10	17	6	—	—	—	—	—
2021–22	KHT	2. Divisioona	12	6	13	19	8	—	—	—	—	—
2022–23	KHT	2. Divisioona	2	2	1	3	2	2	0	0	0	2
SM-liiga totals			65	11	7	18	22	—	—	—	—	—
Mestis totals			180	70	92	162	212	23	4	9	13	20
Slovak totals			101	26	45	71	116	14	2	2	4	12
Poland totals			79	40	69	109	129	17	3	7	10	20
