= Jokela (surname) =

Jokela is a Finnish surname, originating from the name of the town of Jokela, located 30 miles away from Helsinki. Many other locations have the same name around the country. As of 2013, there are 7,000 Finnish people alive today who have this surname. Notable people with the surname include:

- Antti Jokela (born 1981), Finnish ice hockey goaltender
- Juha Jokela (born 1970), Finnish playwright and scriptwriter
- Mikko Jokela (born 1980), Finnish ice hockey defenceman
- Monica Vikström-Jokela (born 1960), Finnish-Swedish television script writer and author
- Leo Jokela (1927–1975), Finnish actor
