= Monica Vikström-Jokela =

Swedish-speaking Finnish television script writer

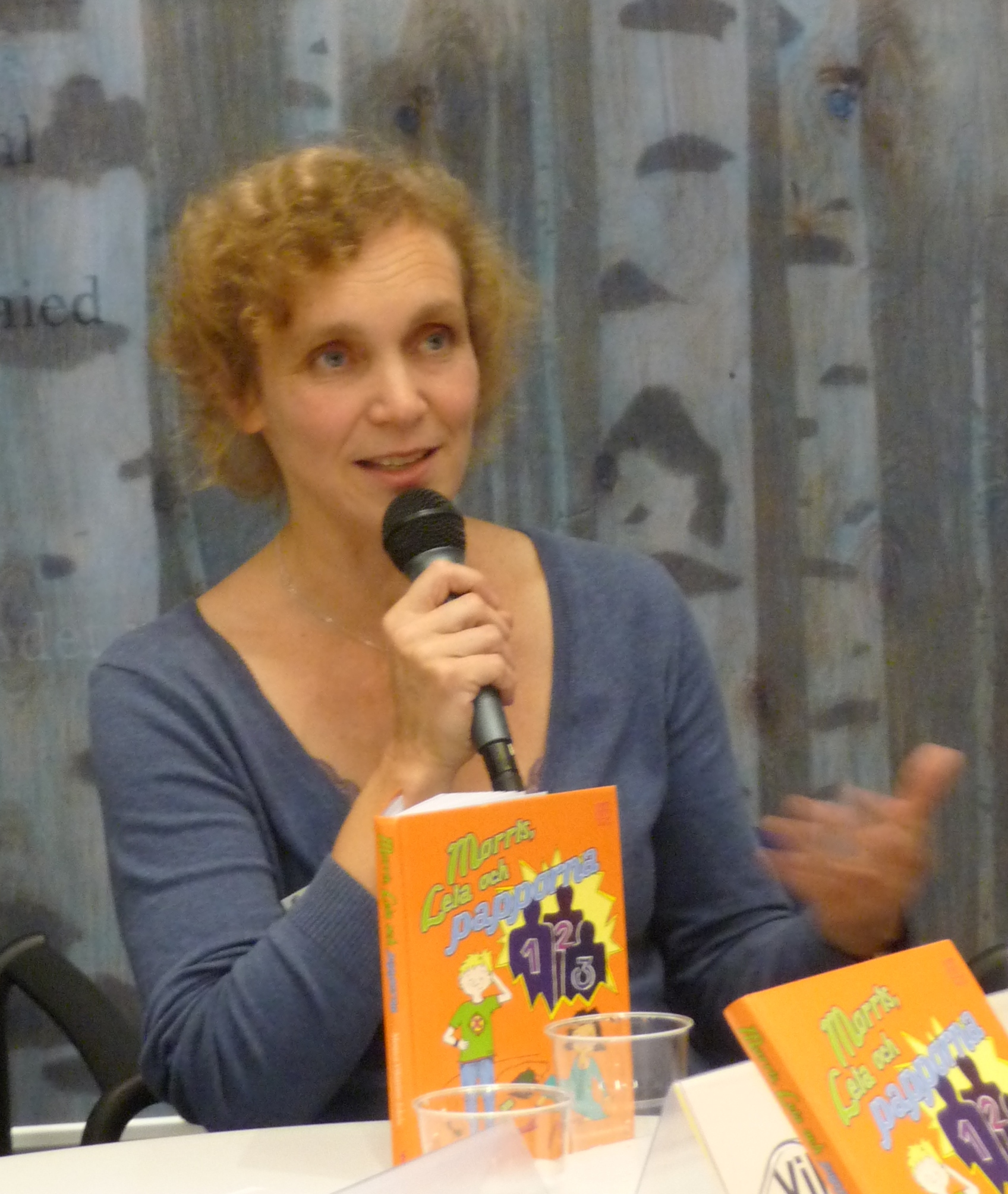
Monica Vikström-Jokela.

Monica Vikström-Jokela (born 19 June 1960) is a Swedish-speaking Finnish television script writer and author.

She lives in Nuuksio, Espoo with her five children. She has written four books about "Ellen Annorlunda" in Swedish, and one fact book "Kyrkoåret runt i skola och hem". The Ellen Annorlunda (translated: Ellen the different one) books have been translated into Finnish and Norwegian. Vikström-Jokela has also written many tales to Kyrkposten in 2004–2005, for example "Kungsorden" and "Dumma kungen"

== Bibliography ==
- Ellen Annorlunda (barnbok). Fontana 2001.
- Ellen Annorlunda: Stjärnroller och magplask (barnbok) Fontana 2002.
- Ellens annorlunda sommar (barnbok). Fontana 2003.
- Ellens annorlunda chat (barnbok). Fontana 2004.
- Kyrkoåret runt i skola och hem (fakta- och andaktsbok, tillsammans med Birgitta Vikström). Församlingsförbundet 1985.

== Plays ==
- Sofias sommar. Purmo sommarteater 2005.
