= Jackson Smith (ice hockey) =

Canadian ice hockey player (born 2007)

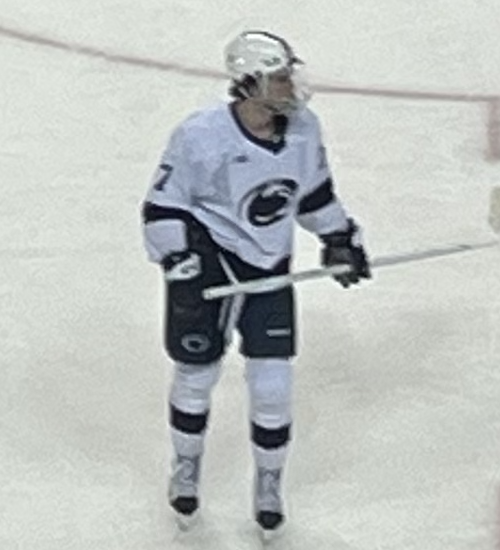
- Smith with Penn State in February 2026
- Born: May 13, 2007 (age 19) Calgary, Alberta, Canada
- Height: 6 ft 3 in (191 cm)
- Weight: 195 lb (88 kg; 13 st 13 lb)
- Position: Defence
- Shoots: Left
- NCAA team: Penn State University
- NHL draft: 14th overall, 2025; Columbus Blue Jackets

Jackson Smith (born May 13, 2007) is a Canadian college ice hockey player for Penn State University of the National Collegiate Athletic Association (NCAA). He was drafted 14th overall by the Columbus Blue Jackets in the 2025 NHL entry draft.

== Playing career ==
In his draft-eligible season in 2024–25, Smith recorded 11 goals and 54 points in 68 games while playing for the Tri-City Americans of the Western Hockey League.

== Awards and honours ==
Award	Year	Ref
College
All-Big Ten Second Team	2026	
All-Big Ten Freshman Team	2026	

Awards and achievements
Preceded by Cayden Lindstrom	Columbus Blue Jackets first-round draft pick 2025	Succeeded by Pyotr Andreyanov
