= Rostislav Klesla =

Czech ice hockey player (born 1982)

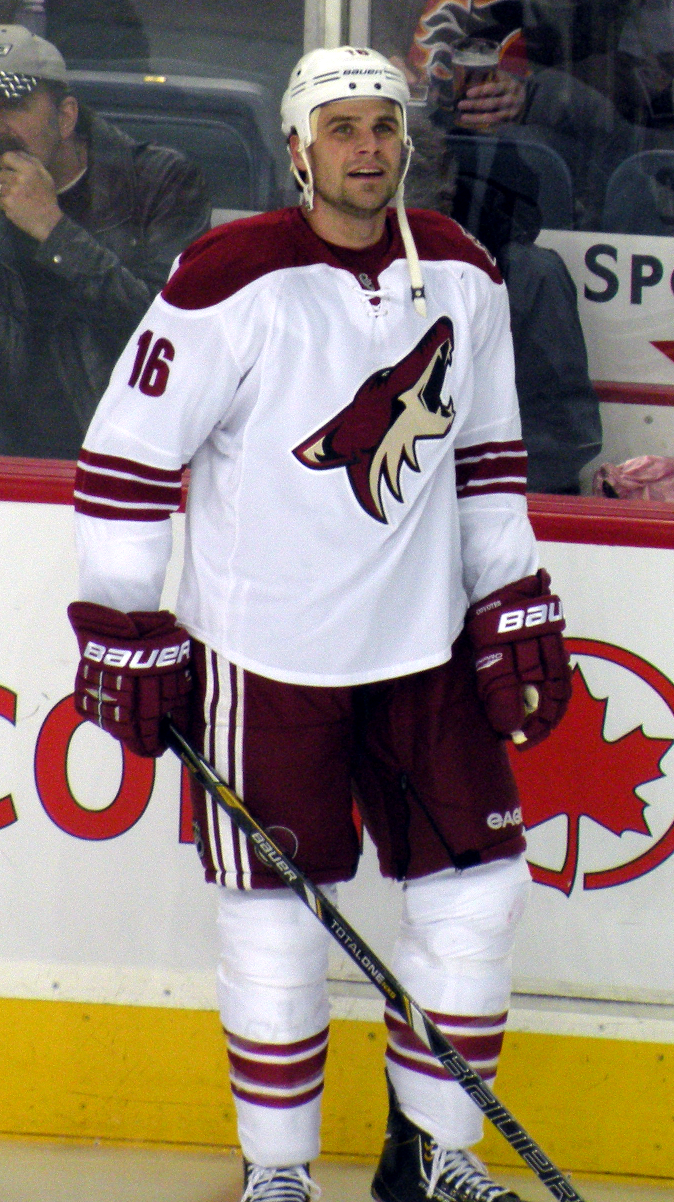
- Klesla with the Phoenix Coyotes in 2013
- Born: March 21, 1982 (age 44) Nový Jičín, Czechoslovakia
- Height: 6 ft 3 in (191 cm)
- Weight: 220 lb (100 kg; 15 st 10 lb)
- Position: Defence
- Shot: Left
- Played for: Columbus Blue Jackets; VHK Vsetín; HPK; Phoenix Coyotes; HC Oceláři Třinec
- National team: Czech Republic
- NHL draft: 4th overall, 2000; Columbus Blue Jackets
- Playing career: 2000–2016

Rostislav "Rusty" Klesla (born March 21, 1982) is a Czech former professional ice hockey defenceman. Klesla was selected fourth overall by the Columbus Blue Jackets in the 2000 NHL entry draft, making him the first ever pick in an entry draft by the Blue Jackets. He has also played in the NHL with the Phoenix Coyotes.

== Playing career ==
=== Junior ===
Klesla spent the 1997–98 season with HC Opava Jr. of the Czech Republic Junior League, where, in 38 games, Klesla scored 11 goals and 29 points. In eight playoff games, Klesla had two goals and four points.

Klesla began playing junior hockey in North America in 1998–99, when he played for the Sioux City Musketeers of the USHL. In 54 games, Klesla had four goals and 16 points, while getting 100 penalty minutes. In five playoff games, Klesla scored two goals.

Klesla moved to the Brampton Battalion of the Ontario Hockey League (OHL) for the 1999–2000 season. In 67 games with Brampton, Klesla had 16 goals and 45 points, along with 174 penalty minutes, as he helped the Battalion to their first ever playoff berth. In six playoff games, Klesla had a goal and two points. He returned to the Battalion in 2000–01 season, having a break-out season offensively. In 45 games, Klesla had 18 goals and 54 points. Klesla then added two goals and 11 points in nine playoff games. Klesla also played for the Czech Republic in the 2001 World Junior Hockey Championship, where he had three goals and seven points in seven games.

=== Professional ===
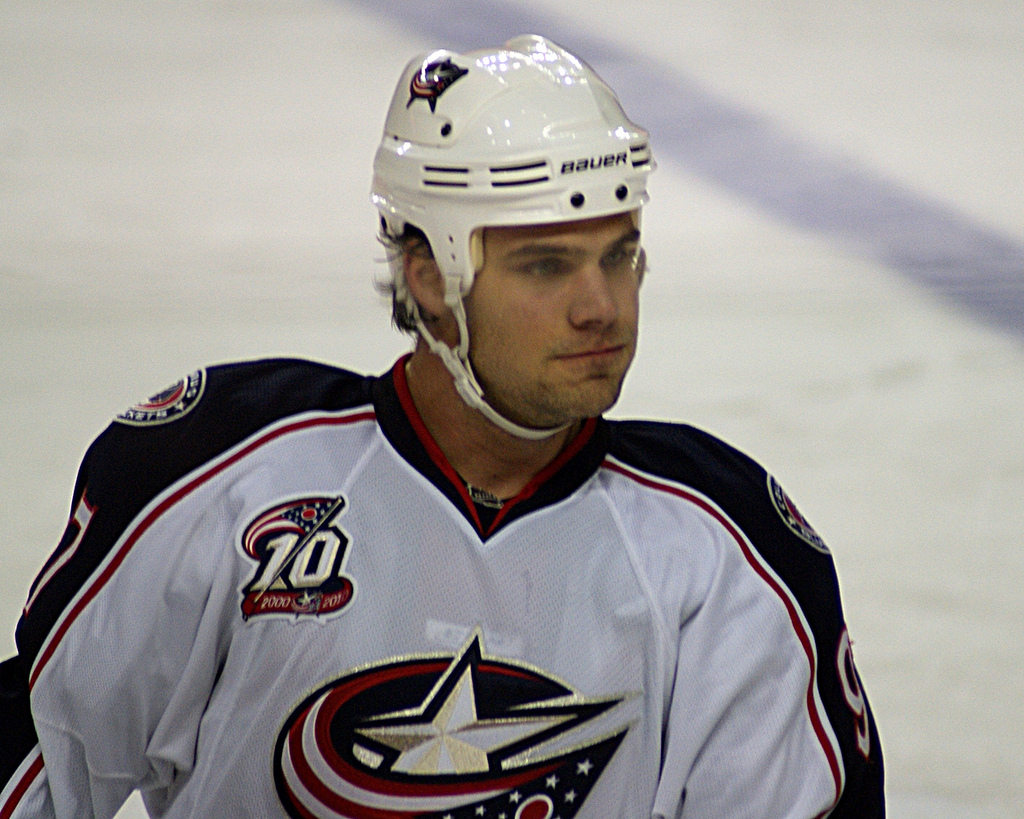
Klesla as a member of the Blue Jackets

Klesla appeared in eight games with the Columbus Blue Jackets in the team's inaugural 2000–01 season, scoring two goals for the team before being sent back to junior hockey with the Battalion. He stayed in the NHL on a full-time basis in 2001–02, scoring eight goals and adding 16 points in 75 games with the Blue Jackets and earning a spot on the NHL All-Rookie Team. After the season, he played for the Czech Republic in the World Hockey Championship, where he had a goal and three points in seven games.

Klesla had two goals and 16 points with the Blue Jackets in 2002–03, while scoring two goals and 13 points in a 47-game injury shortened season with Columbus in 2003–04. With the 2004–05 NHL lockout cancelling the season, he played with VHK Vsetín of the Czech Extraliga, where he had seven goals and 24 points in 41 games. Klesla also played with HPK of the Finnish SM-liiga, where he had a goal and three points in nine games, followed by two assists in 10 playoff games with the club.

Klesla returned to the Blue Jackets in 2005–06, scoring six goals and 19 points in only 51 games played. After the season, Klesla signed a four-year contract extension with the team. On September 26, 2006, Klesla was suspended for two regular season games for a hit on the Chicago Blackhawks' Tuomo Ruutu in a pre-season game on September 22. Ruutu missed ten games due to a grade two sprain on his knee. Klesla had a very solid 2006–07 season, as he was placed alongside Adam Foote as the Blue Jackets' top defensive pairing after Head Coach Ken Hitchcock was hired by the team. In 75 games, Klesla had nine goals and 22 points. In 2007–08, Klesla appeared in all 82 Blue Jacket games, scoring six goals and 18 points. In the off-season, teammate David Výborný left the Blue Jackets, making Klesla the last remaining player from the Blue Jackets inaugural season.

During an injury-shortened 2008–09 season in which Klesla appeared in only 34 games, he scored a goal and nine points, helping Columbus to their first ever post-season appearance. In four playoff games, Klesla had an assist as the Detroit Red Wings swept the Blue Jackets. Injury problems plagued Klesla in the 2009–10 season, as he played in only 26 games, scoring two goals and eight points. In 2010–11, Klesla had three goals and 10 points in 45 games with Columbus.

On February 28, 2011, the Blue Jackets traded Klesla and Dane Byers to the Phoenix Coyotes for Scottie Upshall and Sami Lepistö. Klesla was the last Blue Jacket from the team's first season (2000–01) still active on the team before he was traded in 2011. Klesla went on to play 16 regular season and four playoff games for the Coyotes in 2011, registering one goal.

On March 28, 2013, in a 7–4 Coyotes win over the Los Angeles Kings, Klesla recorded four assists in the opening period of the game, becoming only the eight player since the 1984–85 season to record four assists in the first period of a game. The four points scored in this period would be half the points that Klesla would score that season, as he would finish the year with eight points in 38 games played.

Klesla suffered an injury in a September 15, 2013, pre-season game against the Los Angeles Kings and was taken off the ice on a stretcher. The hit was delivered by Kings' forward Jordan Nolan, who received four minutes in penalties and a 10-minute misconduct for the hit.

On November 26, 2013, Klesla was placed on waivers by the Coyotes and the following day, he was sent down to play with the Coyotes’ American Hockey League (AHL) affiliate, the Portland Pirates. On December 19, 2013, Klesla was recalled to the Coyotes. Klesla featured in 25 games with the Coyotes, primarily as an extra defenseman, before on March 4, 2014, he was traded to the Washington Capitals in a deal along with Chris Brown, and a fourth-round pick in the 2015 NHL entry draft for Martin Erat and John Mitchell.

On March 5, 2014, just one day after being traded to the Capitals, Klesla was traded to the Buffalo Sabres, along with Michal Neuvirth, for Jaroslav Halák and a third-round draft pick.

On March 8, Klesla decided to not report to the Sabres, stating, "[w]ith all due respect to the Sabres organization, I decided this week not to continue playing hockey this season. It has been a tough year for injury and moving several times to new teams...I will now take some time off and get ready to continue my career in Europe. I would like to thank my fans and all the people that have helped me. I am grateful for the career I have had in the NHL and all the people that I have met along the way who have supported me and my family." The Sabres suspended Klesla for not reporting to their AHL affiliate, the Rochester Americans.

Klesla officially ended his NHL career when he returned to his native Czech Republic, signing for a second stint with HC Oceláři Třinec on a two-year contract on June 25, 2014.

== Career statistics ==
=== Regular season and playoffs ===
			Regular season					Playoffs
Season	Team	League	GP	G	A	Pts	PIM	GP	G	A	Pts	PIM
1997–98	HC Slezan Opava	CZE U20	38	11	18	29	87	8	2	2	4	0
1998–99	Sioux City Musketeers	USHL	54	4	12	16	100	5	2	0	2	2
1999–2000	Brampton Battalion	OHL	67	16	29	45	174	6	1	1	2	21
2000–01	Columbus Blue Jackets	NHL	8	2	0	2	6	—	—	—	—	—
2000–01	Brampton Battalion	OHL	45	18	36	54	59	9	2	9	11	26
2001–02	Columbus Blue Jackets	NHL	75	8	8	16	74	—	—	—	—	—
2002–03	Columbus Blue Jackets	NHL	72	2	14	16	71	—	—	—	—	—
2003–04	Columbus Blue Jackets	NHL	47	2	11	13	27	—	—	—	—	—
2004–05	Vsetínská hokejová	ELH	41	7	17	24	136	—	—	—	—	—
2004–05	HC Nový Jičín	CZE.3	2	0	1	1	2	—	—	—	—	—
2004–05	HPK	SM-l	9	1	2	3	12	10	0	2	2	12
2005–06	Columbus Blue Jackets	NHL	51	6	13	19	75	—	—	—	—	—
2006–07	Columbus Blue Jackets	NHL	75	9	13	22	105	—	—	—	—	—
2007–08	Columbus Blue Jackets	NHL	82	6	12	18	60	—	—	—	—	—
2008–09	Columbus Blue Jackets	NHL	34	1	8	9	38	4	0	1	1	0
2009–10	Columbus Blue Jackets	NHL	26	2	6	8	26	—	—	—	—	—
2010–11	Columbus Blue Jackets	NHL	45	3	7	10	26	—	—	—	—	—
2010–11	Phoenix Coyotes	NHL	16	1	0	1	12	4	0	0	0	7
2011–12	Phoenix Coyotes	NHL	65	3	10	13	54	15	2	6	8	4
2012–13	HC Oceláři Třinec	ELH	18	0	1	1	30	—	—	—	—	—
2012–13	Phoenix Coyotes	NHL	38	2	6	8	22	—	—	—	—	—
2013–14	Phoenix Coyotes	NHL	25	1	3	4	24	—	—	—	—	—
2013–14	Portland Pirates	AHL	21	3	6	9	16	—	—	—	—	—
2014–15	HC Oceláři Třinec	ELH	41	5	8	13	44	16	0	3	3	16
2015–16	HC Oceláři Třinec	ELH	33	1	6	7	16	—	—	—	—	—
NHL totals			659	48	111	159	620	23	2	7	9	11
ELH totals			133	13	32	45	226	16	0	3	3	16

=== International ===
Year	Team	Event	Result	GP	G	A	Pts	PIM
2001	Czech Republic	WJC	1st place, gold medalist(s)	7	3	4	7	4
2002	Czech Republic	WC	5th	7	1	2	3	2
2007	Czech Republic	WC	7th	4	1	0	1	8
Junior totals				7	3	4	7	4
Senior totals				11	2	2	4	10

Awards and achievements
Preceded by None	Columbus Blue Jackets first-round draft pick 2000	Succeeded by Pascal Leclaire
