= Janne Jokila =

Finnish ice hockey player

- Born: April 22, 1982 (age 44) Turku, Finland
- Height: 5 ft 9 in (175 cm)
- Weight: 181 lb (82 kg; 12 st 13 lb)
- Position: Left wing
- Shot: Left
- Played for: HC TPS; SaiPa; Lukko; Syracuse Crunch; Milton Keynes Lightning
- NHL draft: 200th overall, 2000; Columbus Blue Jackets
- Playing career: 2000–2014

Janne Jokila (born April 22, 1982) is a Finnish former professional ice hockey player who last played for Milton Keynes Lightning in the English Premier Ice Hockey League. His former teams include HC TPS of the SM-liiga and Syracuse Crunch of the AHL.

His career began with HC TPS before moving to North America in 2002 after taking part in the 2000 NHL entry draft, being selected by the Columbus Blue Jackets, although he would never go on to play in the NHL. He returned to Finland in 2005 and moved to the UK in 2012.

Jokila has represented the Finland men's national ice hockey team at the Under 18's World Championship in 2000 and the Under 20's World Championship in 2002.

His brother, Jarmo Jokila, is also a professional ice hockey player with HC Banská Bystrica in the Slovak Extraliga.

== Career statistics ==
=== Regular season and playoffs ===
			Regular season					Playoffs
Season	Team	League	GP	G	A	Pts	PIM	GP	G	A	Pts	PIM
1997–98	TPS	FIN U18	30	11	10	21	28	6	3	1	4	2
1998–99	TPS	FIN U18	31	17	15	32	52	—	—	—	—	—
1998–99	TPS	FIN U20	5	0	0	0	2	—	—	—	—	—
1999–2000	TPS	FIN U18	6	2	5	7	6	—	—	—	—	—
1999–2000	TPS	FIN U20	35	10	7	17	32	13	3	3	6	4
2000–01	TPS	FIN U20	22	15	15	30	30	1	0	0	0	2
2000–01	TPS	SM-liiga	2	0	0	0	0	—	—	—	—	—
2000–01	SaiPa	SM-liiga	8	1	1	2	0	—	—	—	—	—
2001–02	TPS	SM-liiga	14	1	1	2	4	—	—	—	—	—
2001–02	Jukurit	Mestis	4	0	1	1	0	—	—	—	—	—
2001–02	SaiPa	FIN U20	3	0	1	1	10	—	—	—	—	—
2001–02	SaiPa	SM-liiga	12	0	0	0	2	—	—	—	—	—
2001–02	Lukko	SM-liiga	14	0	1	1	22	—	—	—	—	—
2002–03	River City Lancers	USHL	52	16	22	38	61	11	2	3	5	20
2003–04	Albany River Rats	AHL	7	0	0	0	0	—	—	—	—	—
2003–04	Dayton Bombers	ECHL	69	17	23	40	69	—	—	—	—	—
2004–05	Syracuse Crunch	AHL	2	0	0	0	0	—	—	—	—	—
2004–05	Dayton Bombers	ECHL	70	24	22	46	78	—	—	—	—	—
2005–06	FPS	Mestis	44	24	18	42	89	—	—	—	—	—
2006–07	SaiPa	SM-liiga	30	1	3	4	2	—	—	—	—	—
2006–07	SaPKo	Mestis	11	2	4	6	43	—	—	—	—	—
2006–07	TUTO Hockey	Mestis	5	2	3	5	29	8	3	1	4	2
2007–08	Kristianstads IK	SWE.3	35	17	12	29	44	—	—	—	—	—
2008–09	Hokki	Mestis	38	13	10	23	46	11	3	2	5	4
2009–10	Hokki	Mestis	43	10	18	28	106	—	—	—	—	—
2010–11	TUTO Hockey	Mestis	43	13	16	29	54	—	—	—	—	—
2011–12	FPS	FIN.3	14	5	8	13	4	—	—	—	—	—
2012–13	Milton Keynes Lightning	GBR.2	19	7	17	24	16	3	0	1	1	4
2013–14	Milton Keynes Lightning	GBR.2	53	30	40	70	106	2	1	1	2	2
SM-liiga totals			80	3	6	9	30	—	—	—	—	—
Mestis totals			188	64	70	134	367	19	6	3	9	6

=== International ===
Year	Team	Event	GP	G	A	Pts	PIM
2002	Finland	WJC	7	1	0	1	2
Junior totals			7	1	0	1	2
