= List of Columbus Blue Jackets records =

This is a list of franchise records for the Columbus Blue Jackets of the National Hockey League

Updated as of April 17, 2025.

== Career regular season leaders ==
	Career leader		Active leader^{†}	
Games	Boone Jenner	741	Boone Jenner	741
Goals	Rick Nash	289	Boone Jenner	199
Power play goals	Rick Nash	83	Boone Jenner	43
Short-handed goals	Cam Atkinson	16	Boone Jenner	7
Game-winning goals	Rick Nash	44	Boone Jenner	28
Hat tricks	Cam Atkinson	6	Kirill Marchenko	3
Assists	Zach Werenski	271	Zach Werenski	271
Points	Rick Nash	547	Zach Werenski	384
Shots on goal	Rick Nash	2278	Boone Jenner	1860
Best plus/minus	Artemi Panarin	+37	Dante Fabbro	+23
Penalty minutes	Jared Boll	1,195	Boone Jenner	414
Goaltender games	Sergei Bobrovsky	374	Elvis Merzlikins	244
Goaltender wins	Sergei Bobrovsky	213	Elvis Merzlikins	94
Shutouts	Sergei Bobrovsky	33	Elvis Merzlikins	11
Saves	Sergei Bobrovsky	10,193	Elvis Merzlikins	6,650
Shots against	Sergei Bobrovsky	11,067	Elvis Merzlikins	7,376
Save percentage^{‡}	Sergei Bobrovsky	.921	Elvis Merzlikins	.902
Goals against average^{‡}	Sergei Bobrovsky	2.41	Elvis Merzlikins	3.20

^{†}As of April 17, 2025

^{‡}Minimum 75 games played with the franchise

== Career playoff leaders ==
	Player	Total
Games	Boone Jenner	37
Games	David Savard	37
Goals	Cam Atkinson	10
Power play goals	Boone Jenner	3
Power play goals	Zach Werenski	3
Power play goals	Matt Duchene	3
Assists	Cam Atkinson	16
Points	Cam Atkinson	26
Shots on goal	Boone Jenner	110
Shooting percentage	Matt Duchene	27.8%
Best plus/minus	Matt Calvert	+10
Penalty minutes	Josh Anderson	45
Goaltender games	Sergei Bobrovsky	27
Goaltender wins	Sergei Bobrovsky	11
Saves	Sergei Bobrovsky	855
Shots against	Sergei Bobrovsky	942
Save percentage	Elvis Merzlikins	.946
Goals against average	Joonas Korpisalo	1.90

== Single season records ==
=== Team ===
	Total	Year
Most wins	50	2016–17
Fewest wins	22	2001–02
Most shootout wins^{†}	9	2014–15
Most playoffs wins	6	2018–19
Most regulation losses	47	2001-02
Fewest losses^{‡}	24	2016-17
Most ties	9	2000–01
Most points	108	2016-17
Fewest points^{‡}	57	2001-02
Most goals for	262	2021-22
Fewest goals for^{‡}	164	2001-02
Most goals against	276	2005–06
Fewest goals against^{‡}	193	2016-17
Best powerplay %	21.7%	2014-15
Best penalty kill %	85.3%	2002-03
Most penalty minutes	1477	2002–03

^{†}Shootouts did not exist until the 2005–2006 season.

^{‡}Excluding the shortened seasons 1994–95 (lockout), 2012–13 (lockout), and the 2019-2020 (pandemic)

=== Skaters ===
	Player	Total	Year
Goals	Rick Nash	41	2003–04
Goals	Cam Atkinson	41	2018-19
Power play goals	Rick Nash	19	2003-04
Short-handed goals	Rick Nash	5	2008–09
Game-winning goals	Cam Atkinson	9	2016–17
Assists	Artemi Panarin	59	2018-19
Assists	Zach Werenski	59	2024-25
Points	Artemi Panarin	87	2018-19
Shots on goal	Rick Nash	329	2007–08
Shooting percentage^{†}	Matt Calvert	22.0%	2010–11
Plus/minus	David Savard	+33	2016-17
Penalties in minutes	Jody Shelley	249	2002-03
Goals per game^{‡}	Rick Nash	0.57	2005–06
Assists per game^{‡}	Artemi Panarin	0.75	2018-19
Points per game^{‡}	Artemi Panarin	1.10	2018-19
Longest goal streak	Geoff Sanderson	7 games	2002–03
Longest goal streak	Cam Atkinson	7 games	2018–19
Longest point streak	Ryan Johansen	13 games	2014–15

^{†}Minimum 1 shot per team game.

^{‡}Minimum 25 games played.

=== Goalies ===
	Player	Total	Year
Games played	Marc Denis	77	2002–03
Wins	Sergei Bobrovsky	41	2016–17
Shutouts	Steve Mason	10	2008–09
Saves	Marc Denis	2172	2002-03
Save percentage^{†}	Sergei Bobrovsky	.932	2012–13
Goals against average^{†}	Sergei Bobrovsky	2.00	2012-13

^{†}Minimum 25 games played.

== Single game records ==
=== Team ===
	Total	Date
Goals	10	Nov. 4, 2016; Columbus 10, Montreal 0
Goals against	10	Mar. 30, 2002; Columbus 2, San Jose 10
Goals, one period	5	Dec. 31, 2018; Columbus 6, Ottawa 3
Goals, one period	5	Nov. 4, 2016; Columbus 10, Montreal 0
Goals, one period	5	Mar. 15, 2003; Columbus 5, Minnesota 0
Goals against, one period	6	Dec. 7, 2022; Columbus 2, Buffalo 9
Goals against, one period	6	Dec. 17, 2005; Columbus 3, Nashville 7
Power play goals	5	Dec. 10, 2006; Columbus 6, Ottawa 2
Power play goals against	5	Nov. 13, 2003; Columbus 3, Ottawa 6
Power play goals against	5	Feb. 6, 2006; Columbus 2, Vancouver 5
Power play goals against	5	Jan. 6, 2007; Columbus 2, San Jose 5
Short-handed goals	2	Feb. 24, 2007; Columbus 3, New York Rangers 2
Short-handed goals	2	Mar. 22, 2011; Columbus 4, Colorado 5 (SO)
Short-handed goals	2	Mar. 19, 2017; Columbus 4, New Jersey 1
Short-handed goals	2	Dec. 21, 2019; Columbus 5, New Jersey 1
Short-handed goals against	2	12 times, most recent: Nov. 4, 2018; Columbus 1, Los Angeles 4
Shots on goal	63	Aug. 11, 2020; Columbus 2, Tampa Bay 3 (5OT)
Fewest shots for	10	Apr. 1, 2003; Columbus 0, Philadelphia 4
Shots against	88	Aug. 11, 2020; Columbus 2, Tampa Bay 3 (5OT)
Fewest shots against	13	Feb. 21, 2009; Columbus 2, Anaheim 5
Penalty minutes	70	Feb. 21, 2003; Columbus 0, San Jose 6
Opponent penalty minutes	86	Nov. 9, 2002; Columbus 6, New York Rangers 3
Penalty minutes (both teams)	152	Jan. 11, 2006; Columbus 6, Pittsburgh 1
Penalty minutes (both teams)	152	Now. 9, 2002; Columbus 6, New York Rangers 3

=== Skaters ===
	Player	Total	Date
Goals	Geoff Sanderson	4	Mar. 29, 2003; Columbus 6, Calgary 4
Goals, one period	Deron Quint	3	Mar. 9, 2001; Columbus 7, Florida on 6
Goals, one period	Geoff Sanderson	3	Mar. 29, 2003; Columbus 6, Calgary 4
Goals, one period	Jeff Carter	3	Dec. 22, 2011; Columbus 5, Nashville 6
Goals, one period	Emil Bemstrom	3	May 3, 2021; Nashville 4, Columbus 3 (ot)
Power play goals	Bryan Berard	3	Jan. 8, 2006; Columbus 5, Phoenix 2
Assists	Espen Knutsen	5	Mar. 24, 2001; Columbus 6, Calgary 4
Assists	Artemi Panarin	5	Dec. 8, 2017; Columbus 5, New Jersey 3
Points	5 players	5	5 times, most recent: Artemi Panarin, Dec. 8, 2017; Columbus 5, New Jersey 3
Shots on goal	7 players	10	11 times, most recent: Oliver Bjorkstrand, Dec. 5, 2019; Columbus 2, New York Rangers 3
Penalty minutes	Duvie Westcott	31	Apr. 13, 2006; Columbus 4, St. Louis 1
Time on ice	Seth Jones	65:06	Aug. 11, 2020; Columbus 2, Tampa Bay 3 (5OT)
Plus/minus	Alexander Wennberg	+6	Mar. 27, 2018; Columbus 7, Edmonton 3

=== Goalies ===
	Player	Total	Date
Goals against	Marc Denis	8	Feb. 4, 2002; Columbus 0, Boston 8
Goals against	Steve Mason	8	Nov. 11, 2009; Columbus 1, Detroit 9
Goals against	Sergei Bobrovsky	8	Oct. 13, 2018; Columbus 2, Tampa Bay 8
Goals against	Sergei Bobrovsky	8	Dec. 4, 2018; Columbus 6, Calgary 9
Shorthanded Goals against	Sergei Bobrovsky	2	9 times, most recent: Nov. 3, 2018; Columbus 1, Los Angeles 4
Shots against	Joonas Korpisalo	88	Aug. 11, 2020; Columbus 2, Tampa Bay 3 (5OT)
Saves	Joonas Korpisalo	85	Aug. 11, 2020; Columbus 2, Tampa Bay 3 (5OT)
Saves, one period	Joonas Korpisalo	25	Mar. 26, 2016; Columbus 1, Nashville 5
Saves, penalty kill	Pascal Leclaire	25	Dec. 1, 2005; Columbus 1, St Louis 4
Saves, shootout^{†}	Steve Mason	9	Dec. 1, 2009; Columbus 3, Chicago 4
Points	Elvis Merzlikins	1	31 times, most recent: Nov. 6, 2021; Columbus 4, Colorado 2

^{†}Shootouts did not exist until the 2005–2006 season.

== See also ==
- List of Columbus Blue Jackets players
- List of Columbus Blue Jackets seasons
