= List of Columbus Blue Jackets players =

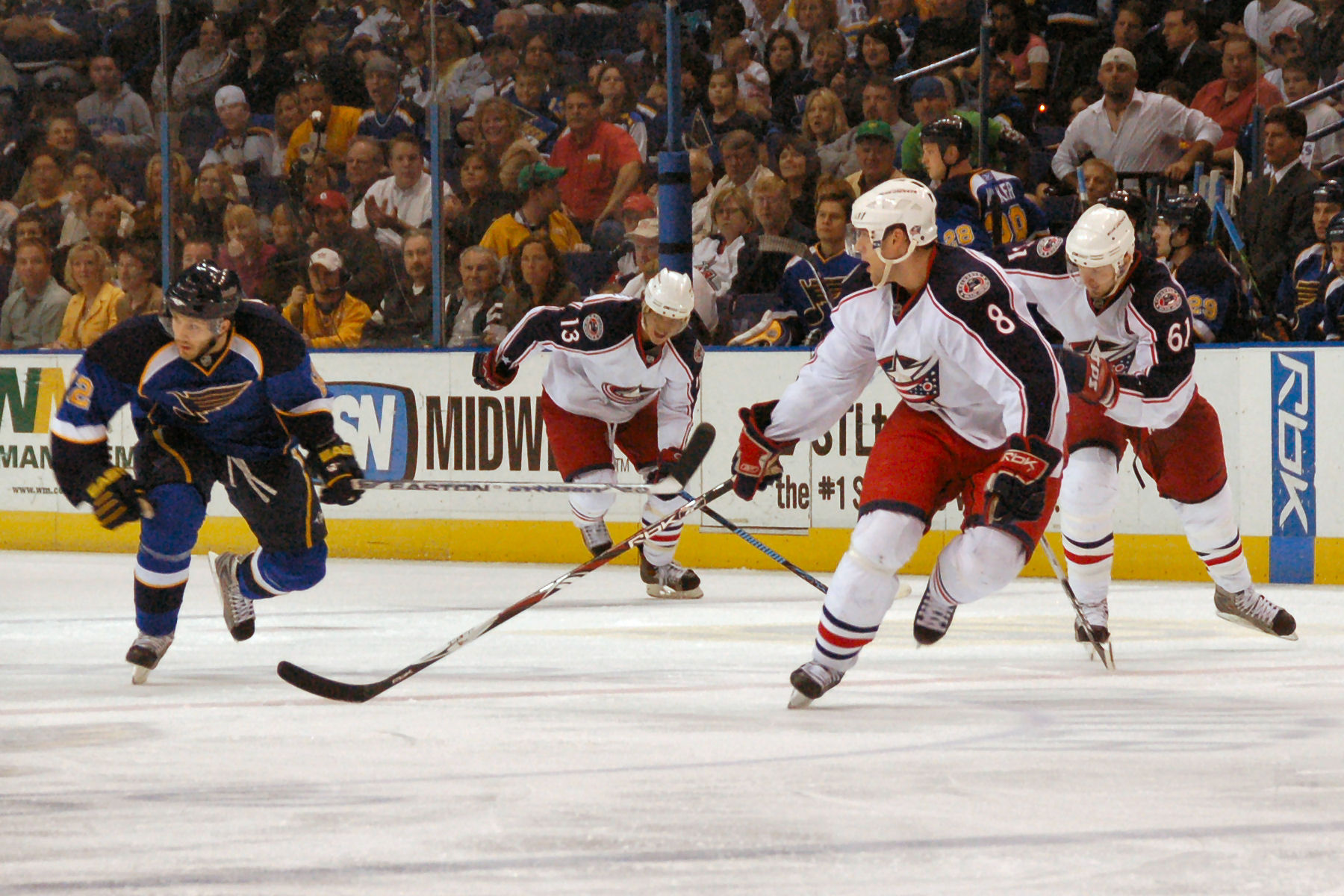
Blue Jackets' players skate back on defense in a game vs. the St. Louis Blues.

The Columbus Blue Jackets are a professional ice hockey team based in Columbus, Ohio, United States. They are members of the Metropolitan Division of the Eastern Conference of the National Hockey League (NHL). The Blue Jackets began play in 2000 as an expansion franchise. As of May 2011, 173 players have appeared in at least one game with the Blue Jackets: 15 goaltenders and 158 skaters (forwards and defensemen).

Five players have served as the Blue Jackets' captain. Each NHL team may select a captain, who has the "sole privilege of discussing with the referee any questions relating to interpretation of rules which may arise during the progress of a game". Captains are required to wear the letter "C" on their uniform for identification, which is 3 inches (7.6 cm) in height. Lyle Odelein was named the team's first captain in the inaugural season of 2000–01. Rick Nash, the second-most recent captain, is the team's franchise goal scoring leader. The captaincy is currently held by Boone Jenner.

== Key ==
- * Appeared in a Blue Jackets game during the 2025–26 season.
- † Hockey Hall of Fame

Abbreviations
Nat	Nationality
GP	Games played

Goaltenders
W	Wins	SO	Shutouts
L	Losses	GAA	Goals against average
T	Ties	SV%	Save percentage
OTL	Overtime loss		

Skaters
Pos	Position	RW	Right wing	A	Assists
D	Defenseman	C	Centre	P	Points
LW	Left wing	G	Goals	PIM	Penalty minutes

The seasons column lists the first year of the season of the player's first game and the last year of the season of the player's last game. For example, a player who played one game in the 2000–01 season would be listed as playing with the team from 2000–01, regardless of what calendar year the game occurred within.

Statistics are complete to the end of the 2025–26 NHL season.

== Goaltenders ==
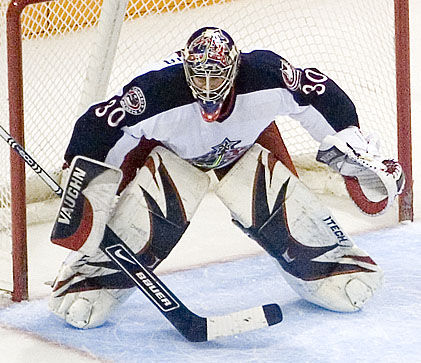
Fredrik Norrena made his NHL debut with the Blue Jackets in 2006 after a lengthy career in Finland and Sweden.

	Nat	Seasons	Regular season								Playoffs						Notes
	Nat	Seasons	GP	W	L	T	OTL	SO	GAA	SV%	GP	W	L	SO	GAA	SV%	Notes
Jean-Francois Berube	Canada	2021–2022	6	3	2	—	0	0	4.12	.900	—	—	—	—	—	—	
Sergei Bobrovsky	Russia	2012–2019	374	213	130	—	27	24	2.37	.923	27	11	16	0	3.41	.897	Vezina Trophy—2013; Vezina Trophy—2017 All Star, 2015, 2017
Brian Boucher	United States	2006–2007	3	1	1	—	0	0	3.79	.866	—	—	—	—	—	—	
Fred Brathwaite	Canada	2003–2004	21	4	11	1	—	0	3.37	.897	—	—	—	—	—	—	
Ty Conklin	United States	2006–2007	11	2	3	—	2	0	3.30	.871	—	—	—	—	—	—	
Marc Denis	Canada	2000–2006	266	84	146	24	1	12	3.01	.905	—	—	—	—	—	—	
Wade Dubielewicz	Canada	2008–2009	3	1	2	—	0	0	3.55	.870	—	—	—	—	—	—	
Anton Forsberg	Sweden	2014–2007	10	1	8	—	0	0	3.55	.870	—	—	—	—	—	—	
Mathieu Garon	Canada	2009–2011	71	22	23	—	12	5	2.77	.902	—	—	—	—	—	—	
Jon Gillies	United States	2022–2023	3	1	1	—	0	0	4.57	.864	—	—	—	—	—	—	
Jet Greaves	Canada	2022–2026	76	36	28	—	11	4	2.61	.913	—	—	—	—	—	—	
Shawn Hunwick	United States	2011–2012	1	0	0	—	0	0	0.00	1.000	—	—	—	—	—	—	
Michael Hutchinson	Canada	2022–2023	16	2	6	—	3	0	4.29	.875	—	—	—	—	—	—	
Matiss Kivlenieks	Latvia	2019–2021	8	2	2	—	2	0	3.09	.899	—	—	—	—	—	—	
Joonas Korpisalo	Finland	2015–2023	210	87	78	—	24	3	3.06	.903	—	—	—	—	—	—	
Jean-Francois Labbe	Canada	2001–2003	14	3	5	0	—	0	3.49	.890	—	—	—	—	—	—	
Dan LaCosta	Canada	2007–2009	4	2	0	—	0	1	1.42	.953	—	—	—	—	—	—	
Pascal Leclaire	Canada	2003–2009	125	45	55	0	12	10	2.82	.907	—	—	—	—	—	—	
David LeNeveu	Canada	2010–2011	1	0	0	—	0	0	6.00	.833	—	—	—	—	—	—	
Spencer Martin	Canada	2023–2024	13	3	8	—	1	0	3.65	.887	—	—	—	—	—	—	
Steve Mason	Canada	2008–2013	232	96	98	—	27	19	2.90	.903	4	0	4	0	4.27	.861	Calder Memorial Trophy—2009
Curtis McEhinney	Canada	2013–2016	85	26	33	—	8	2	2.82	.909	—	—	—	—	—	—	
Mike McKenna	United States	2013–2014	4	1	1	—	1	0	3.01	.904	—	—	—	—	—	—	
Elvis Merzlikins*	Latvia	2019–2026	274	108	111	-	38	12	3.22	.900	—	—	—	—	—	—	
Fredrik Norrena	Finland	2006–2009	100	35	45	—	11	5	2.79	.899	—	—	—	—	—	—	
Tomas Popperle	Czech Republic	2006–2007	2	0	0	—	0	0	1.35	.929	—	—	—	—	—	—	
Martin Prusek	Czech Republic	2005–2006	9	3	3	—	0	0	3.21	.879	—	—	—	—	—	—	
Curtis Sanford	Canada	2011–2012	36	10	18	—	4	1	2.60	.911	—	—	—	—	—	—	
Malcolm Subban	Canada	2023–2024	1	0	1	—	0	0	3.00	.914	—	—	—	—	—	—	
Daniil Tarasov	Russia	2021–2025	65	19	34	—	6	1	3.44	.898	—	—	—	—	—	—	
Ron Tugnutt	Canada	2000–2002	97	34	52	8	—	6	2.62	.910	—	—	—	—	—	—	
Veini Vehvilainen	Finland	2020–2021	1	0	0	—	0	0	5.63	.750	—	—	—	—	—	—	
Allen York	Canada	2011–2012	11	3	2	—	0	0	2.30	.920	—	—	—	—	—	—	

== Skaters ==
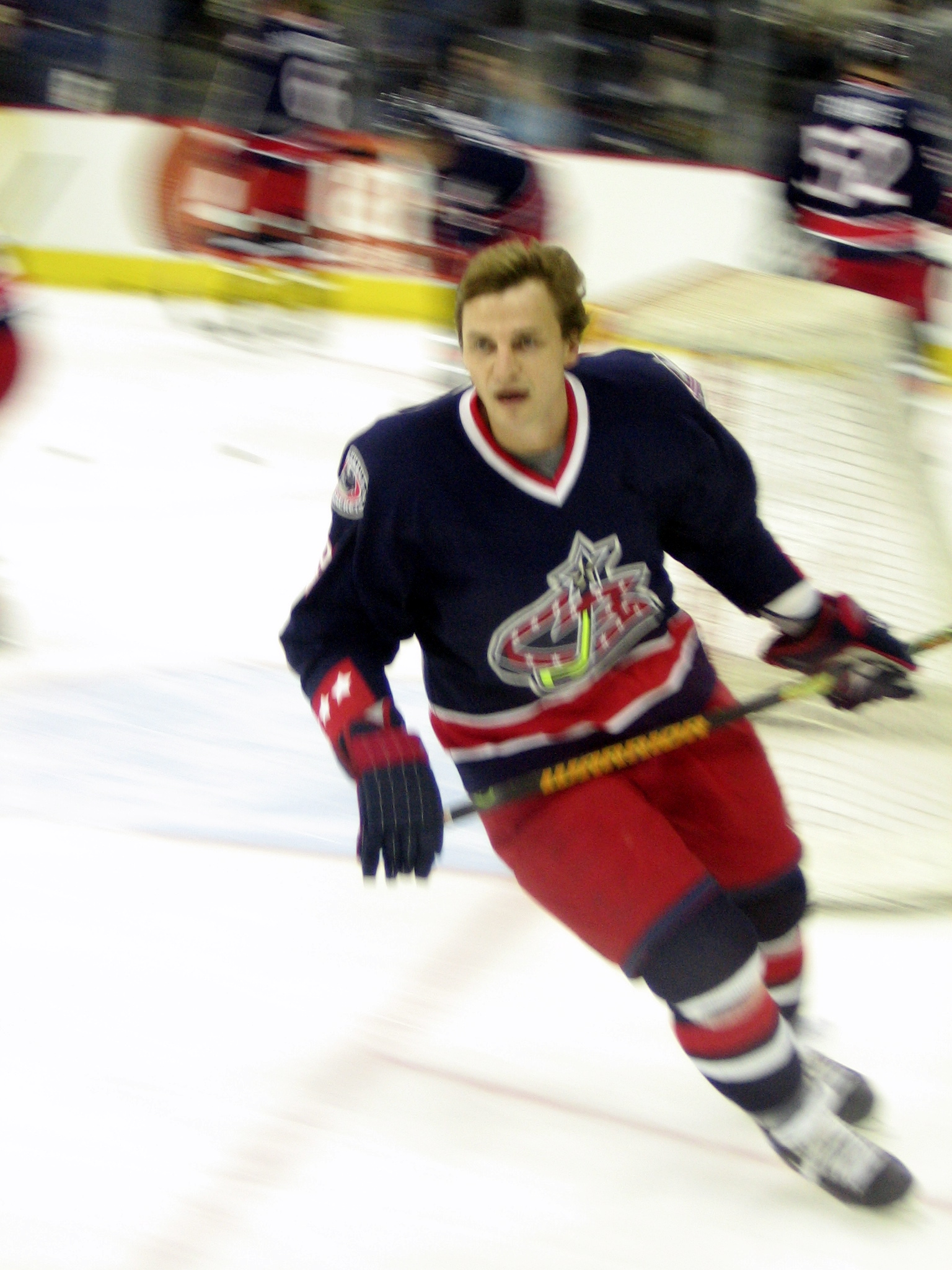
In three seasons with the Blue Jackets, Sergei Fedorov had 113 points

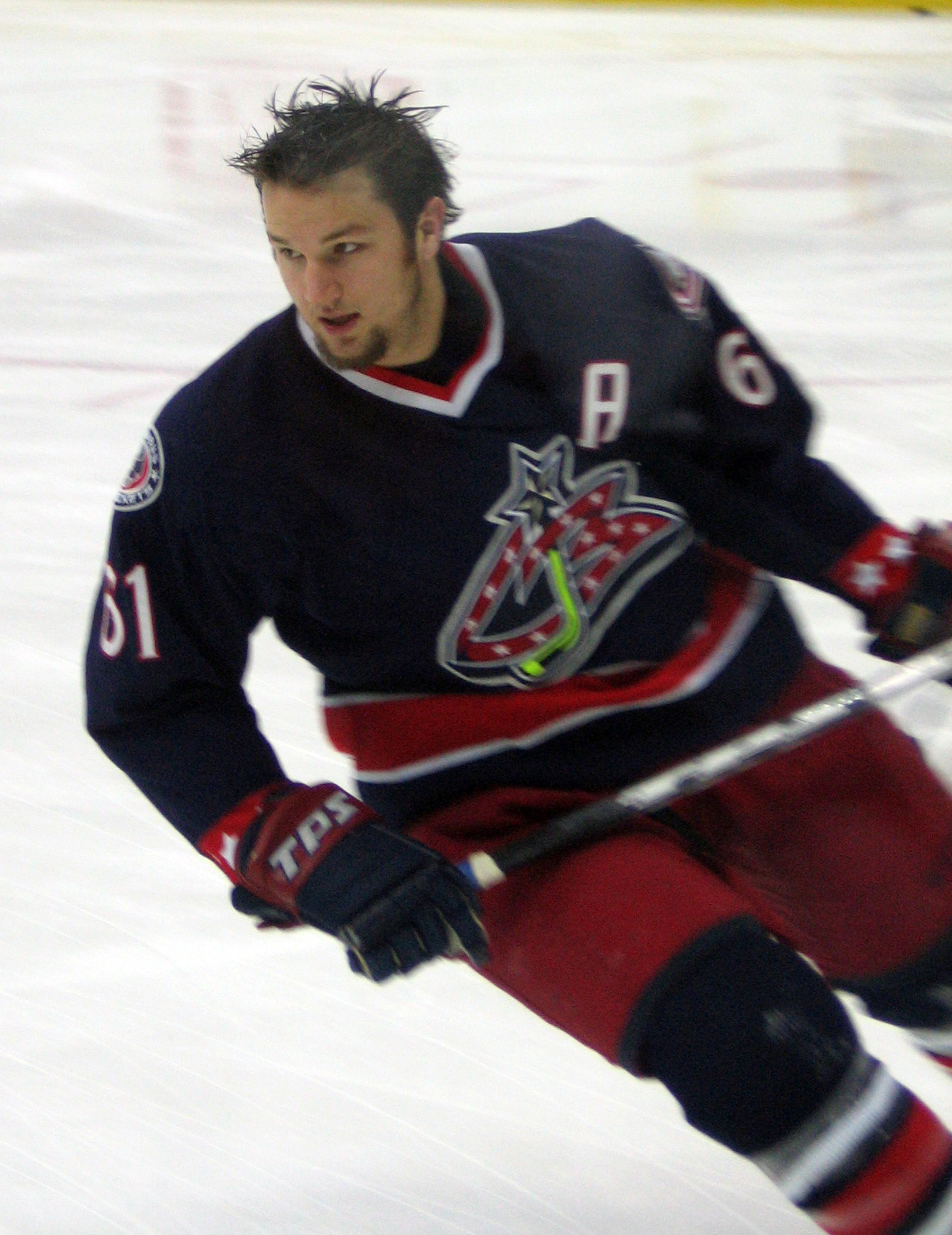
In his second season in the NHL, Rick Nash won the Rocket Richard Trophy, tying for the league lead in goals with 41, also a Blue Jackets record

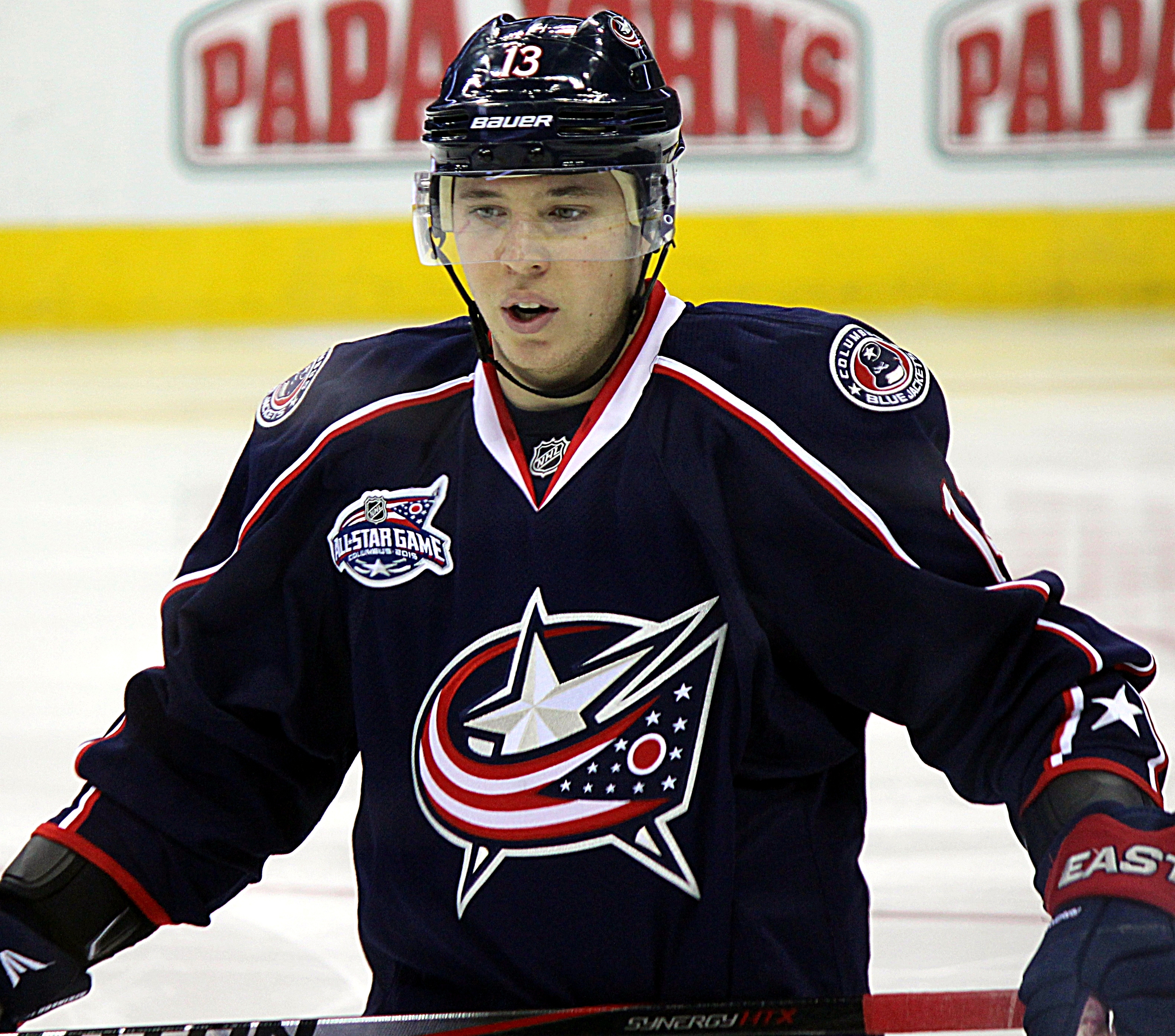
Cam Atkinson

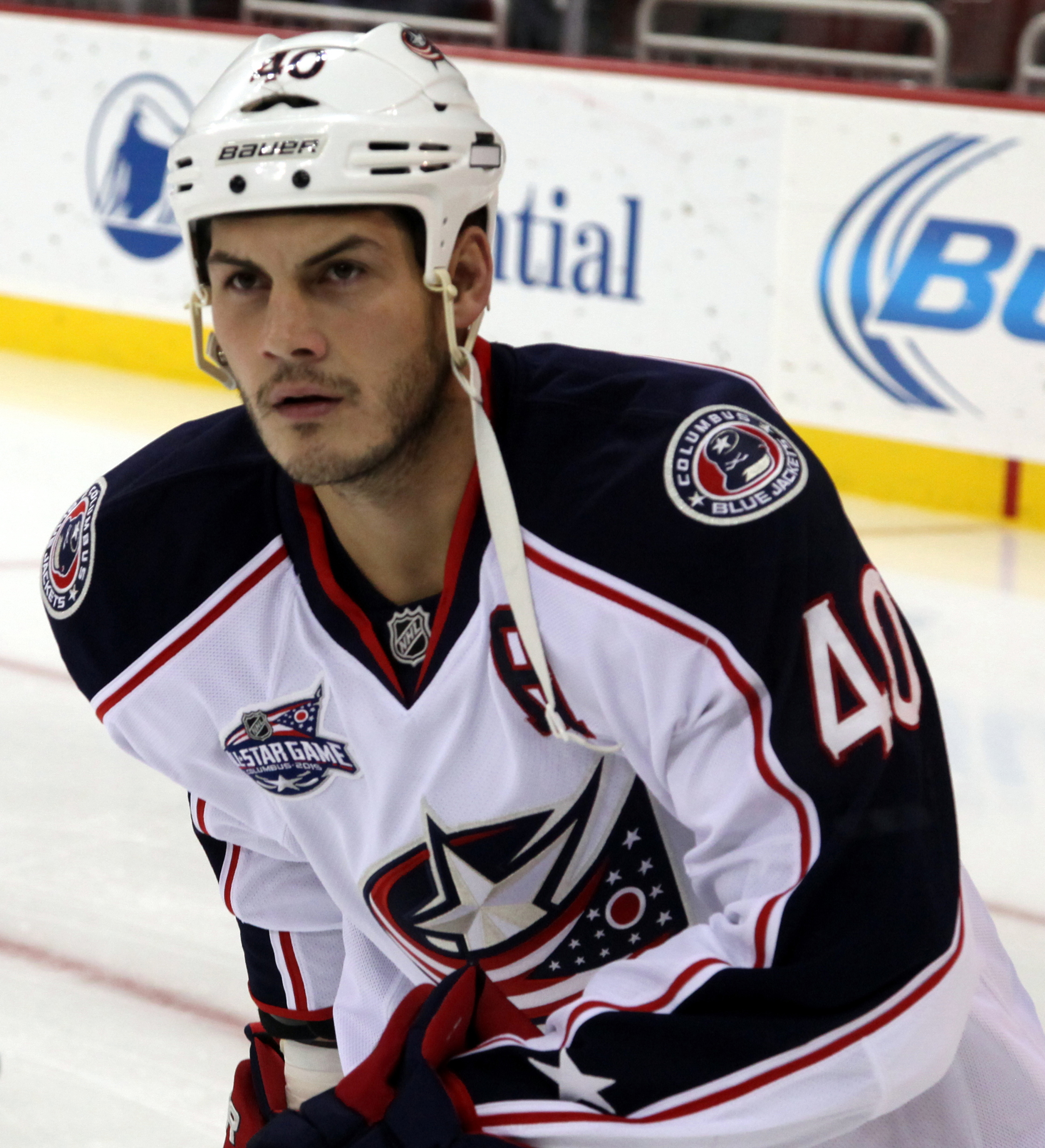
Jared Boll Franchise all-time leader in penalty minutes

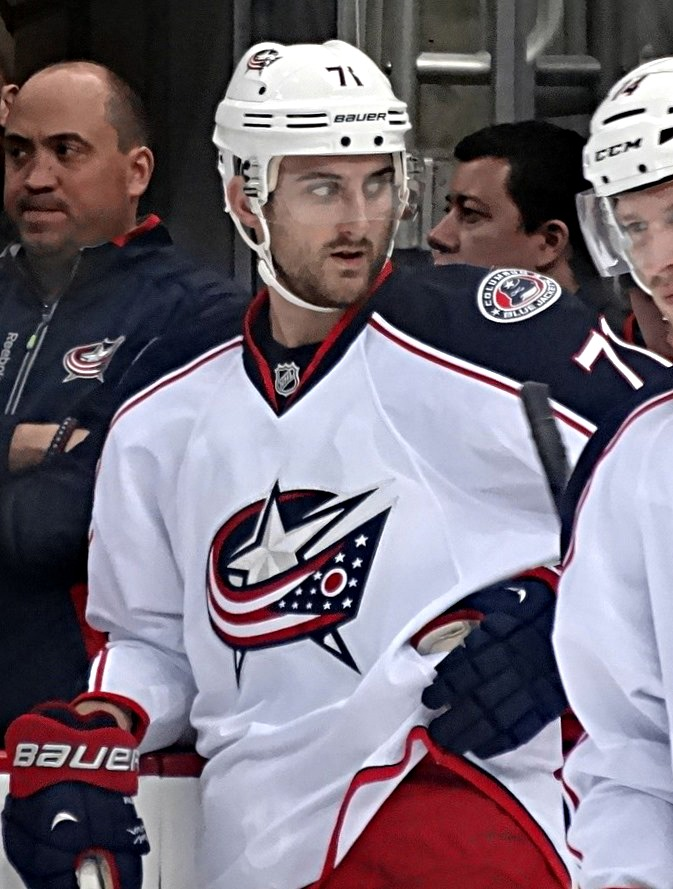
Nick Foligno

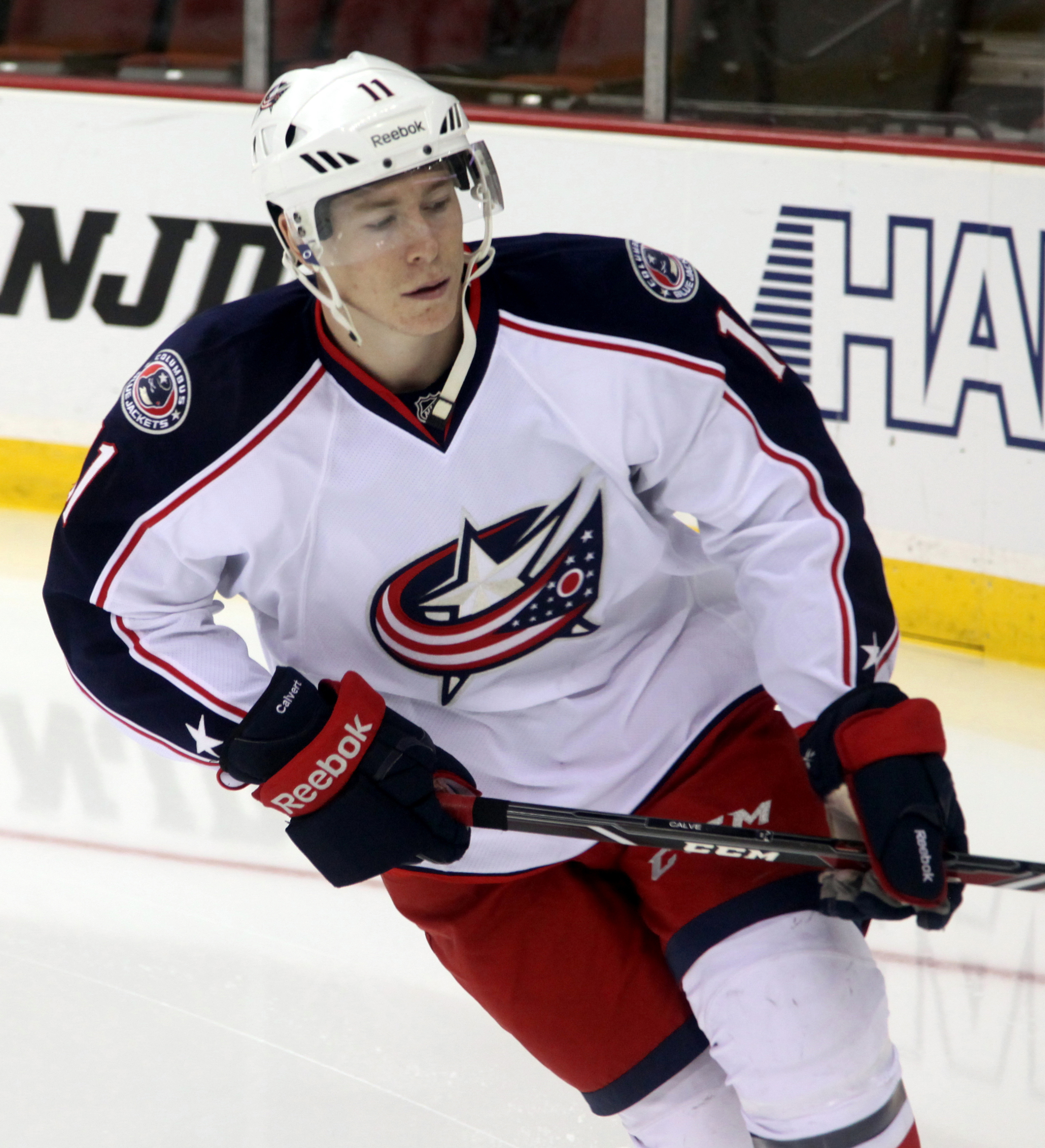
Matt Calvert

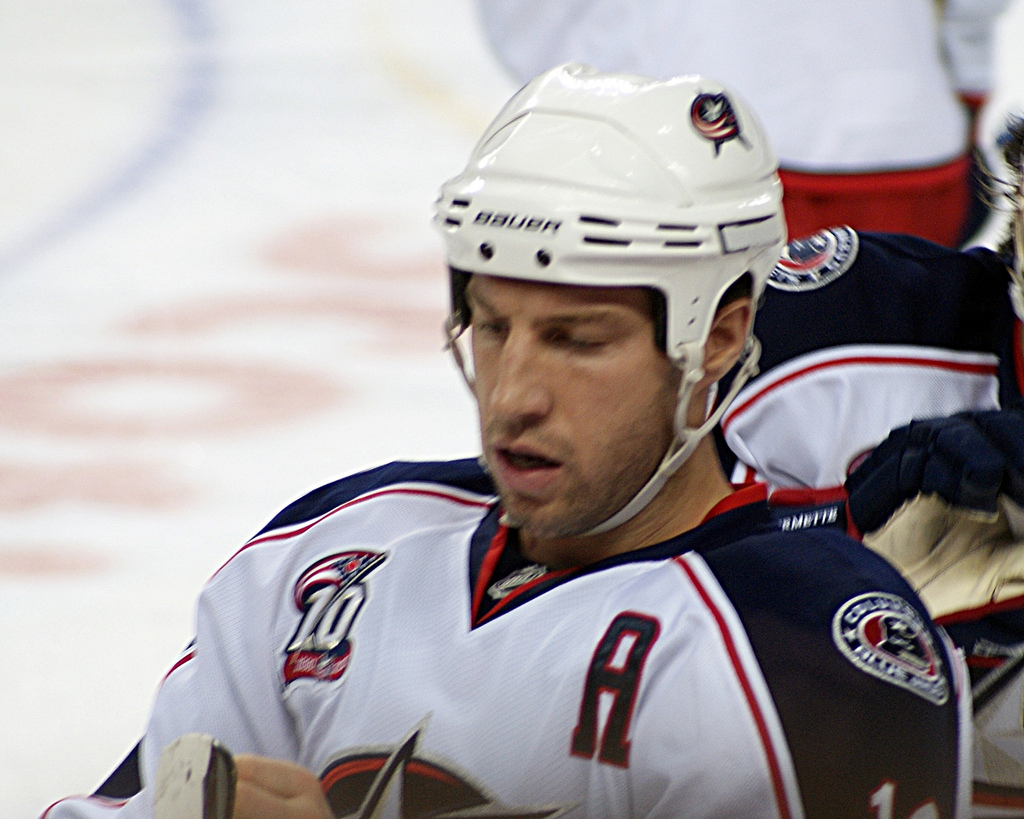
R. J. Umberger

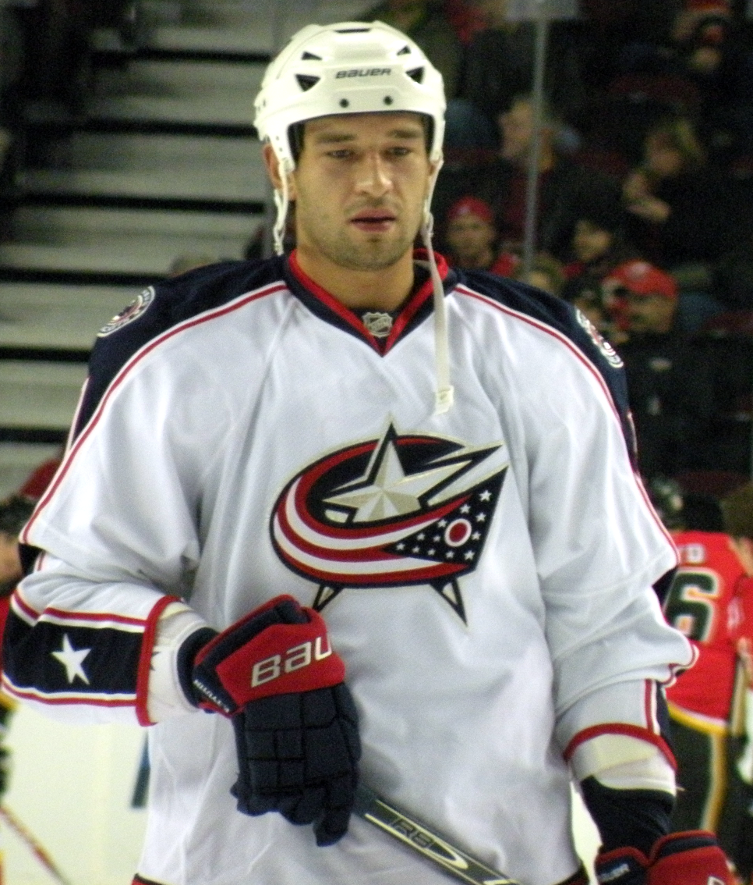
Fedor Tyutin

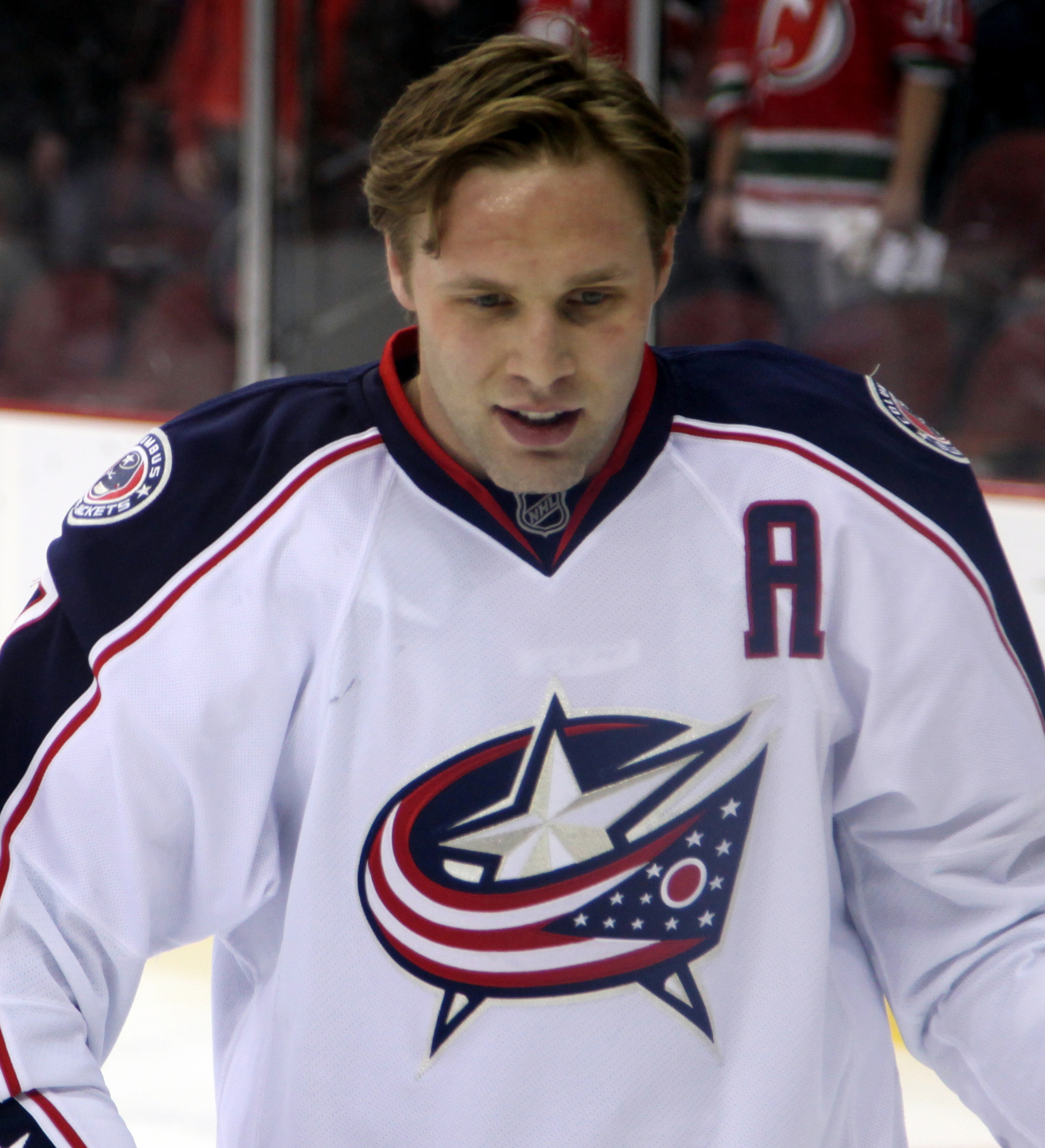
Jack Johnson

	Nat	Pos	Seasons	Regular season					Playoffs					Notes
	Nat	Pos	Seasons	GP	G	A	P	PIM	GP	G	A	P	PIM	Notes
Luke Adam	Canada	C	2014–2015	3	0	0	0	4	—	—	—	—	—	
Kevyn Adams	United States	C	2000–2001	66	8	12	20	52	—	—	—	—	—	
Jamie Allison	Canada	D	2001–2003	55	0	1	1	127	—	—	—	—	—	
Josh Anderson	Canada	RW	2014-2020	267	65	50	115	212	21	3	5	8	45	
Tyler Angle	Canada	C	2022–2024	4	1	0	1	0	—	—	—	—	—	
Artem Anisimov	Russia	C	2012–2015	168	40	44	84	40	6	1	2	3	4	
Cam Atkinson	United States	RW	2011-2021	627	213	189	402	146	35	10	16	26	10	All Star, 2017, 2019
Zach Aston-Reese*	United States	C	2024–2026	106	7	15	22	39	—	—	—	—	—	
Serge Aubin	Canada	C	2000–2002	152	21	25	46	139	—	—	—	—	—	
Adrian Aucoin	Canada	D	2012–2013	36	0	4	4	16	—	—	—	—	—	
Jonathan Audy-Marchessault	Canada	C	2012–2013	2	0	0	0	0	—	—	—	—	—	
Christian Backman	Sweden	D	2008–2009	56	2	5	7	32	—	—	—	—	—	
Jaroslav Balastik	Czech Republic	LW	2005–2007	74	13	11	24	30	—	—	—	—	—	
Cody Bass	Canada	C	2011–2014	15	0	1	1	37	—	—	—	—	—	
Gavin Bayreuther	United States	D	2020–2023	103	3	20	23	52	—	—	—	—	—	
Jake Bean	Canada	D	2021–2024	153	12	32	44	64	—	—	—	—	—	
Francois Beauchemin	Canada	D	2005–2006	11	0	2	2	11	—	—	—	—	—	
Kris Beech	Canada	C	2007–2008	16	5	4	9	2	—	—	—	—	—	
Blake Bellefeuille	United States	C	2001–2003	5	0	1	1	0	—	—	—	—	—	
Emil Bemstrom	Sweden	RW	2019–2024	204	31	38	69	28	5	0	0	0	2	
Bryan Berard	United States	D	2005–2007	55	12	23	35	40	—	—	—	—	—	
Tim Berni	Switzerland	D	2022–2023	59	1	2	3	34	—	—	—	—	—	
Radim Bicanek	Czech Republic	D	2000–2002	69	1	7	8	40	—	—	—	—	—	
Marcus Björk	Sweden	D	2022–2023	33	3	8	11	42	—	—	—	—	—	
Oliver Bjorkstrand	Denmark	RW	2015-2022	382	111	123	234	74	31	6	6	12	0	
Nick Blankenburg	United States	D	2021–2024	55	6	12	18	24	—	—	—	—	—	
Mike Blunden	Canada	RW	2009–2011	41	2	2	4	59	—	—	—	—	—	
Andrew Bodnarchuk	Canada	D	2015–2016	16	0	2	2	8	—	—	—	—	—	
Jared Boll	United States	RW	2007–2016	518	27	35	62	1,095	3	0	0	0	0	
Adam Boqvist	Sweden	D	2021–2024	133	17	39	56	20	—	—	—	—	—	
Rene Bourque	Canada	RW	2014–2016	57	7	5	12	42	—	—	—	—	—	
Bill Bowler	Canada	C	2000–2001	9	0	2	2	8	—	—	—	—	—	
Darryl Boyce	Canada	C	2011–2012	20	0	3	3	19	—	—	—	—	—	
Derick Brassard	Canada	C	2007–2013	309	58	111	169	184	—	—	—	—	—	
Gavin Brindley	United States	C	2023–2024	1	0	0	0	0	—	—	—	—	—	
Alex Broadhurst	United States	C	2017–2018	2	0	0	0	2	—	—	—	—	—	
Gilbert Brule	Canada	C	2005–2008	146	12	20	32	30	—	—	—	—	—	
Cameron Butler	Canada	F	2023–2024	1	0	0	0	0	—	—	—	—	—	
Dane Byers	Canada	LW	2011–2012	8	0	0	0	29	—	—	—	—	—	
Jan Caloun	Czech Republic	RW	2000–2001	11	0	3	3	2	—	—	—	—	—	
Matt Calvert	Canada	LW	2010-2018	416	72	77	149	273	16	6	4	10	12	
Darcy Campbell	Canada	D	2006–2007	1	0	0	0	0	—	—	—	—	—	
Gregory Campbell	Canada	LW	2015–2016	82	3	8	11	78	—	—	—	—	—	
Gabriel Carlsson	Sweden	D	2016–2022	75	3	13	16	22	5	0	0	0	0	
Anson Carter	Canada	RW	2006–2007	54	10	17	27	16	—	—	—	—	—	
Jeff Carter	Canada	C	2011–2012	39	15	10	25	14	—	—	—	—	—	
Andrew Cassels	Canada	D	2002–2004	137	26	68	94	56	—	—	—	—	—	
Michael Chaput	Canada	C	2013–2016	58	2	6	8	28	—	—	—	—	—	
Jason Chimera	Canada	LW	2005–2010	331	62	74	136	372	4	0	1	1	2	
Egor Chinakhov*	Russia	RW	2021–2026	204	37	40	77	42	—	—	—	—	—	
Taylor Chorney	United States	D	2017–2018	1	0	0	0	0	—	—	—	—	—	
Jake Christiansen*	Canada	D	2021–2026	152	2	16	18	25	—	—	—	—	—	
Chris Clark	United States	RW	2009–2011	89	8	12	20	59	—	—	—	—	—	
David Clarkson	Canada	RW	2014–2016	26	2	2	4	37	—	—	—	—	—	
Adam Clendening	United States	D	2018–2019	4	0	0	0	0	7	0	1	1	2	
Grant Clitsome	Canada	D	2009–2012	93	9	27	36	46	—	—	—	—	—	
Ian Cole	United States	D	2017–2018	20	2	5	7	24	6	0	3	3	2	
Sean Collins	Canada	C	2012–2015	19	0	3	3	8	—	—	—	—	—	
Blake Comeau	Canada	LW	2012–2014	70	7	14	21	42	6	0	0	0	10	
Mike Commodore	Canada	D	2008–2011	158	9	32	41	206	4	0	0	0	18	
Kevin Connauton	Canada	D	2014–2016	81	10	17	27	50	—	—	—	—	—	
Charlie Coyle*	United States	C	2025–2026	82	20	38	58	14	—	—	—	—	—	
Adam Cracknell	Canada	RW	2014–2015	17	0	1	1	2	—	—	—	—	—	
Ryan Craig	Canada	F	2013–2015	8	0	0	0	0	—	—	—	—	—	
Kevin Dahl	Canada	D	2000–2001	4	0	0	0	2	—	—	—	—	—	
Zac Dalpe	Canada	RW	2017–2019; 2020–2021	25	2	2	4	13	—	—	—	—	—	
Marko Dano	Slovakia	RW	2014–2015, 2019–2020	38	8	13	21	16	—	—	—	—	—	
Justin Danforth	Canada	C	2021–2025	183	31	33	64	58	—	—	—	—	—	
Mathieu Darche	Canada	LW	2000–2003	24	1	1	2	6	—	—	—	—	—	
Matt Davidson	Canada	RW	2000–2003	56	5	7	12	28	—	—	—	—	—	
Luca Del Bel Belluz*	Canada	C	2023–2026	30	3	7	10	4	—	—	—	—	—	
Andy Delmore	Canada	D	2005–2006	7	0	0	0	2	—	—	—	—	—	
Michael Del Zotto	Canada	D	2020–2021	53	4	9	13	8	—	—	—	—	—	
Kevin Dineen	Canada	RW	2000–2003	129	13	15	28	200	—	—	—	—	—	
Max Domi	Canada	LW	2020–2022	107	18	38	56	112	—	—	—	—	—	
Derek Dorsett	Canada	RW	2008–2013	280	27	38	65	727	3	0	0	0	2	
Nick Drazenovic	Canada	C	2012–2013	8	0	0	0	4	—	—	—	—	—	
Ted Drury	United States	C	2000–2001	1	0	0	0	0	—	—	—	—	—	
Matt Duchene	Canada	C	2018-2019	23	4	8	12	2	10	5	5	10	0	
Anthony Duclair	Canada	LW	2018-2019	53	11	8	19	12	—	—	—	—	—	
Brandon Dubinsky	United States	C	2012–2019	430	72	153	217	448	27	3	6	9	24	
Pierre-Luc Dubois	Canada	C	2017–2021	239	66	93	159	164	26	8	11	19	24	
Josh Dunne	United States	C	2020–2023	14	0	0	0	6	—	—	—	—	—	
Ryan Dzingel	United States	LW	2018-2019	21	4	8	12	0	9	1	0	1	2	
Anders Eriksson	Sweden	D	2003–2004; 2006–2007	145	7	43	50	64	—	—	—	—	—	
Tim Erixon	Sweden	D	2012–2014	52	1	10	11	20	—	—	—	—	—	
Dante Fabbro*	Canada	D	2024–2026	136	14	23	37	73	—	—	—	—	—	
Adam Fantilli*	Canada	C	2023–2026	213	67	73	140	72	—	—	—	—	—	
Justin Falk	Canada	D	2014–2016	29	1	5	6	24	—	—	—	—	—	
Sergei Fedorov	Russia	C	2005–2008	185	39	74	113	150	—	—	—	—	—	
Nikita Filatov	Russia	LW	2008–2011	44	6	7	13	16	—	—	—	—	—	
Christian Fischer	United States	RW	2024–2025	1	0	0	0	0	—	—	—	—	—	
Trey Fix-Wolansky	Canada	RW	2021–2024	26	4	2	6	2	—	—	—	—	—	
Nick Foligno	United States	LW	2012-2021	599	142	192	334	466	34	7	9	16	28	Captain, 2015–2020, All Star, 2015
Adam Foote	Canada	D	2005–2008	187	10	39	49	155	—	—	—	—	—	Captain, 2005–2008
Liam Foudy	Canada	F	2019–2024	90	7	12	19	14	10	1	1	2	0	
Matt Frattin	Canada	F	2013–2014	4	0	1	1	0	—	—	—	—	—	
Trevor Frischmon	Canada	C	2009–2010	3	0	0	0	4	—	—	—	—	—	
Dan Fritsche	United States	C	2003–2008	206	29	34	63	91	—	—	—	—	—	
Marian Gaborik	Slovakia	RW	2012–2014	34	9	13	22	12	—	—	—	—	—	
Sam Gagner	Canada	LW	2016–2017	81	18	32	50	22	5	0	2	2	2	
Bruce Gardiner	Canada	RW	2000–2001	73	7	15	22	78	—	—	—	—	—	
Conor Garland*	United States	RW	2025–2026	21	5	2	7	4	—	—	—	—	—	
Johnny Gaudreau	United States	LW	2022–2024	161	33	101	134	44	—	—	—	—	—	
Michael Gaul	Canada	D	2000–2001	2	0	0	0	4	—	—	—	—	—	
Brendan Gaunce*	Canada	C	2021–2024; 2025–2026	84	9	9	18	32	—	—	—	—	—	
Vladislav Gavrikov	Russia	D	2018–2023	256	15	58	73	130	12	1	2	3	6	
Nathan Gerbe	United States	C	2017–2021	41	5	8	13	24	2	0	0	0	0	
Brian Gibbons	United States	RW	2014–2015	25	0	5	5	8	—	—	—	—	—	
Colton Gillies	Canada	LW	2011–2013	65	3	5	8	42	—	—	—	—	—	
Alexandre Giroux	Canada	LW	2011–2012	9	1	0	1	8	—	—	—	—	—	
Curtis Glencross	Canada	LW	2006–2008	43	6	6	12	25	—	—	—	—	—	
Steven Goertzen	Canada	RW	2005–2007	46	0	0	0	54	—	—	—	—	—	
Cody Goloubef	Canada	D	2011–2016	96	2	16	18	41	—	—	—	—	—	
Jean-Luc Grand-Pierre	Canada	D	2000–2004	202	4	10	14	239	—	—	—	—	—	
Chris Gratton	Canada	C	2008–2009	6	0	1	1	2	—	—	—	—	—	
Mikhail Grigorenko	Russia	C	2020–2021	32	4	8	12	6	—	—	—	—	—	
Erik Gudbranson*	Canada	D	2022–2026	201	8	38	48	156	—	—	—	—	—	
Nate Guenin	Canada	LW	2010–2011	3	0	0	0	2	—	—	—	—	—	
Ron Hainsey	United States	D	2005–2008	213	19	64	83	137	—	—	—	—	—	
Markus Hannikainen	Finland	LW	2015–2019	91	8	7	15	14	1	0	0	0	0	
Brett Harkins	United States	LW	2001–2002	25	2	12	14	8	—	—	—	—	—	
Scott Harrington	Canada	D	2016–2022	185	7	30	37	69	14	0	4	4	12	
Jordan Harris	United States	D	2024–2025	33	1	4	5	6	—	—	—	—	—	
Mark Hartigan	Canada	C	2003–2007	48	11	8	19	30	—	—	—	—	—	
Scott Hartnell	Canada	LW	2014–2017	234	64	82	146	275	4	0	0	0	0	
Danton Heinen*	Canada	C/LW	2025–2026	33	5	5	10	8	—	—	—	—	—	
Steve Heinze	United States	RW	2000–2001	65	22	20	42	38	—	—	—	—	—	
Jan Hejda	Czech Republic	D	2007–2011	302	11	56	67	163	3	0	0	0	2	
Jamie Heward	Canada	D	2000–2002	97	12	18	30	40	—	—	—	—	—	
Gregory Hofmann	Switzerland	C	2021–2022	24	2	5	7	8	—	—	—	—	—	
Nick Holden	Canada	D	2010–2013	7	0	0	0	0	—	—	—	—	—	
Brian Holzinger	United States	C	2003–2004	13	1	0	1	2	—	—	—	—	—	
Nathan Horton	Canada	RW	2013–2014	36	5	14	19	24	—	—	—	—	—	
Jan Hrdina	Czech Republic	C	2005–2006	75	10	23	33	78	—	—	—	—	—	
Cale Hulse	Canada	D	2005–2006	27	0	3	3	43	—	—	—	—	—	
Kristian Huselius	Sweden	RW	2008–2012	189	58	84	142	92	4	1	1	2	4	
Hannes Hyvonen	Finland	RW	2002–2003	36	4	5	9	22	—	—	—	—	—	
Tim Jackman	United States	RW	2003–2004	19	1	2	3	16	—	—	—	—	—	
Boone Jenner*	Canada	C	2013–2026	808	212	209	421	458	37	8	7	15	28	
David Jiricek	Czech Republic	D	2022–2025	53	1	10	11	28	—	—	—	—	—	
Ryan Johansen	Canada	C	2011–2016	309	79	114	193	144	6	2	4	6	4	All Star, 2012, 2015
Aaron Johnson	Canada	D	2003–2007; 2011–2012	172	10	32	42	119	—	—	—	—	—	
Jack Johnson	United States	D	2012–2018; 2024–2025	486	36	124	160	200	11	4	5	9	4	
Kent Johnson*	Canada	C	2021–2026	274	53	85	138	62	—	—	—	—	—	
Jussi Jokinen	Finland	C	2017–2018	14	0	1	1	0	—	—	—	—	—	
Seth Jones	United States	D	2016–2021	381	50	173	223	140	31	3	11	14	8	All Star, 2017, 2018, 2019
Andrew Joudrey	Canada	C	2011–2012	1	0	0	0	0	—	—	—	—	—	
Milan Jurcina	Slovakia	D	2009–2010	17	1	2	3	10	—	—	—	—	—	
Tomi Kallio	Finland	RW	2002–2003	12	11	2	3	8	—	—	—	—	—	
Tomas Kana	Czech Republic	D	2009–2010	6	0	2	2	2	—	—	—	—	—	
William Karlsson	Sweden	C	2014–2017	165	16	31	47	47	5	2	1	3	0	
Rostislav Klesla	Czech Republic	D	2000–2011	515	41	92	133	508	4	0	1	1	0	
Samuel Kňažko	Slovakia	D	2022–2023	2	0	0	0	0	—	—	—	—	—	
Espen Knutsen	Norway	C	2000–2004	188	27	81	108	99	—	—	—	—	—	All Star, 2002
Mikko Koivu	Finland	C	2020–2021	7	1	1	2	2	—	—	—	—	—	
Chad Kolarik	United States	C	2009–2010	2	0	0	0	0	—	—	—	—	—	
Zenith Komarniski	Canada	D	2003–2004	2	0	0	0	0	—	—	—	—	—	
Zenon Konopka	Canada	C	2006–2007	9	0	0	0	35	—	—	—	—	—	
Lauri Korpikoski	Finland	W	2016–2017	9	0	0	0	0	—	—	—	—	—	
Robert Kron	Czech Republic	C	2000–2002	118	12	22	34	14	—	—	—	—	—	
Tomas Kubalik	Czech Republic	RW	2010–2012	12	1	3	4	6	—	—	—	—	—	
Frantisek Kucera	Czech Republic	D	2000–2001	48	2	5	7	12	—	—	—	—	—	
Dean Kukan	Switzerland	D	2015–2022	153	5	25	30	46	19	1	1	2	9	
Luke Kunin	United States	C	2024–2025	12	0	0	0	9	—	—	—	—	—	
Sean Kuraly	United States	C	2021–2025	292	40	45	85	209	—	—	—	—	—	
Kevin Labanc	United States	RW	2024–2025	34	2	10	12	12	—	—	—	—	—	
Joseph LaBate	United States	C	2024–2025	6	0	1	1	10	—	—	—	—	—	
Scott Lachance	United States	D	2002–2004	138	0	5	5	90	—	—	—	—	—	
Patrik Laine	Finland	RW	2020–2024	174	64	74	138	67	—	—	—	—	—	
Brett Lebda	United States	D	2011–2012	30	1	3	4	14	—	—	—	—	—	
Mikko Lehtonen	Finland	D	2020–2021	26	0	6	6	8	—	—	—	—	—	
Jordan Leopold	United States	D	2014–2015	18	1	2	3	9	—	—	—	—	—	
Sami Lepisto	Finland	D	2010–2011	19	0	5	5	18	—	—	—	—	—	
Mark Letestu	Canada	C	2011–2015, 2018-2019	255	44	58	102	36	12	1	1	2	0	
Trevor Letowski	Canada	RW	2003–2006	154	25	35	60	52	—	—	—	—	—	
Jakob Lilja	Sweden	LW	2019–2020	37	2	3	5	2	—	—	—	—	—	
Joakim Lindstrom	Sweden	C	2005–2008	37	4	4	8	18	—	—	—	—	—	
David Ling	Canada	RW	2001–2004	90	4	4	8	191	—	—	—	—	—	
Isac Lundestrom*	Sweden	C	2025–2026	68	4	8	12	4	—	—	—	—	—	
Joona Luoto	Finland	F	2022–2023	7	1	0	1	0	—	—	—	—	—	
Craig MacDonald	Canada	C	2008–2009	8	1	1	2	0	—	—	—	—	—	
Ryan MacInnis	United States	LW	2019–2021	26	0	1	1	0	—	—	—	—	—	
Derek MacKenzie	Canada	C	2007–2014	279	31	38	69	155	6	1	0	1	2	
Donald MacLean	Canada	C	2003–2004	4	1	0	1	0	—	—	—	—	—	
James Malatesta	Canada	LW	2023–2025	13	2	2	4	5	—	—	—	—	—	
Manny Malhotra	Canada	C	2003–2009	344	53	92	145	203	4	0	0	0	0	
Steve Maltais	Canada	LW	2000–2001	26	0	3	3	12	—	—	—	—	—	
Mike Maneluk	Canada	RW	2000–2001	39	5	1	6	33	—	—	—	—	—	
Paul Manning	Canada	D	2002–2003	8	0	0	0	2	—	—	—	—	—	
Todd Marchant	United States	C	2003–2006	95	12	31	43	54	—	—	—	—	—	
Kirill Marchenko*	Russia	RW	2022–2026	292	102	106	208	82	—	—	—	—	—	
Mason Marchment*	Canada	F	2025–2026	39	15	17	32	30	—	—	—	—	—	
Grant Marshall	Canada	RW	2001–2003	147	23	38	61	157	—	—	—	—	—	
Radek Martinek	Czech Republic	D	2011–2012	7	1	0	1	0	—	—	—	—	—	
Denton Mateychuk*	Canada	D	2024–2026	120	17	27	44	28	—	—	—	—	—	
Stefan Matteau	United States	LW	2019–2021	27	3	1	4	14	—	—	—	—	—	
Greg Mauldin	United States	C	2003–2004	6	0	0	0	4	—	—	—	—	—	
Dysin Mayo*	Canada	D	2025–2026	3	0	1	1	0	—	—	—	—	—	
Maxim Mayorov	Russia	LW	2008–2012	22	2	1	3	2	—	—	—	—	—	
Kent McDonell	Canada	RW	2002–2004	32	1	2	3	36	—	—	—	—	—	
Hunter McKown	United States	F	2022–2023	12	0	2	2	8	—	—	—	—	—	
Adam McQuaid	United States	D	2018–2019	14	1	1	2	9	—	—	—	—	—	
Marc Methot	Canada	D	2006–2012	275	7	44	51	208	4	0	0	0	2	
Carson Meyer	United States	RW	2021–2024	41	2	4	6	14	—	—	—	—	—	
Fredrik Modin	Sweden	LW	2006–2010	176	39	46	85	110	4	1	0	1	0	
Sean Monahan*	Canada	C	2024–2026	132	32	61	93	32	—	—	—	—	—	
Sonny Milano	United States	LW	2015-2020	116	20	22	42	32	4	0	0	0	0	
Greg Moore	Canada	C	2009–2010	4	0	0	0	0	—	—	—	—	—	
John Moore	United States	D	2010–2013	86	2	6	8	10	—	—	—	—	—	
Brad Moran	Canada	C	2001–2002; 2003–2004	5	1	1	2	2	—	—	—	—	—	
Ethan Moreau	Canada	LW	2010–2011	37	1	5	6	24	—	—	—	—	—	
Jeremy Morin	United States	RW	2014–2015	28	2	4	6	13	—	—	—	—	—	
Tyler Motte	United States	C	2017–2018	31	3	2	5	2	—	—	—	—	—	
Joe Motzko	United States	RW	2003–2007	11	1	0	1	0	—	—	—	—	—	
Andrew Murray	Canada	C	2007–2011	181	23	13	36	32	—	—	—	—	—	
Ryan Murray	Canada	D	2013–2020	347	15	95	110	104	20	1	1	2	4	
Rick Nash	Canada	LW	2002–2012	674	289	259	547	568	4	1	2	3	2	Captain, 2007–2012; Rocket Richard Trophy—2004, All Star, 2004, 2007, 2008, 2009, 2011
Riley Nash	Canada	C	2018-2021	179	10	23	33	33	17	2	3	5	4	
Andrej Nedorost	Slovakia	LW	2001–2004	28	2	3	5	12	—	—	—	—	—	
Chris Nielsen	Canada	RW	2000–2002	52	6	8	14	8	—	—	—	—	—	
Nikita Nikitin	Russia	D	2011–2014	168	12	44	56	51	5	0	0	0	0	
Filip Novak	Czech Republic	D	2006–2007	6	0	0	0	2	—	—	—	—	—	
Jiri Novotny	Czech Republic	C	2007–2009	107	12	17	29	38	—	—	—	—	—	
Petteri Nummelin	Finland	D	2000–2001	61	4	12	16	10	—	—	—	—	—	
Markus Nutivaara	Finland	D	2016–2020	244	17	43	60	30	12	1	1	2	0	
Gustav Nyquist	Sweden	LW	2019–2023	200	43	74	117	58	10	0	2	2	4	
Alexander Nylander	Sweden	LW	2023–2024	23	11	4	15	6	—	—	—	—	—	
Lyle Odelein	Canada	D	2000–2002	146	5	28	33	207	—	—	—	—	—	Captain, 2000–2002
Mathieu Olivier*	Canada	F	2022–2026	263	43	42	85	391	—	—	—	—	—	
Krzysztof Oliwa	Poland	LW	2000–2001	10	0	2	2	34	—	—	—	—	—	
Nathan Paetsch	Canada	D	2009–2010	10	0	0	0	6	—	—	—	—	—	
Samuel Pahlsson	Sweden	C	2009–2012	222	12	35	47	84	—	—	—	—	—	
Michael Paliotta	United States	D	2015–2016	1	0	0	0	4	—	—	—	—	—	
Artemi Panarin	Russia	LW	2017-2019	160	55	114	169	49	16	7	11	18	6	
Mike Pandolfo	United States	LW	2003–2004	3	0	0	0	0	—	—	—	—	—	
Michael Peca	Canada	C	2007–2009	136	12	44	56	122	4	0	0	0	2	
Lane Pederson	Canada	C	2022–2023	16	2	1	3	11	—	—	—	—	—	
Andrew Peeke	United States	D	2019–2024	218	10	32	42	96	—	—	—	—	—	
Alexandre Picard	Canada	LW	2005–2010	67	0	2	2	58	—	—	—	—	—	
Adam Pineault	United States	RW	2007–2008	3	0	0	0	0	—	—	—	—	—	
Luca Pinelli*	Canada	C	2025–2026	3	0	0	0	0	—	—	—	—	—	
Lasse Pirjeta	Finland	LW	2002–2004	108	13	18	31	32	—	—	—	—	—	
Geoff Platt	Canada	C	2005–2007	41	4	10	14	26	—	—	—	—	—	
Sean Pronger	Canada	C	2001–2003	104	10	7	17	76	—	—	—	—	—	
Vaclav Prospal	Czech Republic	LW	2011–2013	130	28	57	85	68	—	—	—	—	—	
Dalton Prout	Canada	D	2011–2016	209	6	24	30	249	2	0	0	0	0	
Ivan Provorov*	Russia	D	2023–2026	246	21	75	96	83	—	—	—	—	—	
Jamie Pushor	Canada	D	2000–2002; 2003–2006	147	4	18	22	150	—	—	—	—	—	
Mikael Pyyhtia*	Finland	LW	2022–2026	71	5	6	11	8	—	—	—	—	—	
Kyle Quincey	Canada	D	2016–2017	20	2	1	3	12	—	—	—	—	—	
Deron Quint	United States	D	2000–2002	132	14	34	48	42	—	—	—	—	—	
John Ramage	Canada	D	2015–2016	1	0	0	0	0	—	—	—	—	—	
Jeremy Reich	Canada	C	2003–2004	9	0	1	1	20	—	—	—	—	—	
Justin Richards	United States	F	2022–2023	2	0	1	1	0	—	—	—	—	—	
Luke Richardson	Canada	D	2002–2006	190	2	24	26	151	—	—	—	—	—	Captain, 2003–2005
Craig Rivet	Canada	D	2010–2011	14	1	0	1	23	—	—	—	—	—	
Eric Robinson	United States	LW	2017–2024	266	38	44	82	40	10	1	0	1	0	
Todd Rohloff	United States	D	2003–2004	24	0	2	2	8	—	—	—	—	—	
Aaron Rome	Canada	D	2007–2009	25	1	2	3	33	1	0	1	1	0	
Jack Roslovic	United States	C	2020–2024	246	51	95	146	50	—	—	—	—	—	
Mathieu Roy	Canada	D	2009–2010	31	0	10	10	17	—	—	—	—	—	
Michael Rupp	United States	RW	2005–2006	39	4	2	6	58	—	—	—	—	—	
Kris Russell	Canada	D	2007–2012	288	18	61	79	124	4	1	1	2	2	
Ryan Russell	Canada	LW	2011–2012	41	2	0	2	2	—	—	—	—	—	
Kerby Rychel	United States	LW	2014–2016	37	2	10	12	17	—	—	—	—	—	
Brandon Saad	United States	LW	2015–2017	160	55	51	106	22	5	1	2	3	0	All Star, 2016
Geoff Sanderson	Canada	LW	2000–2006	261	88	80	168	126	—	—	—	—	—	
Peter Sarno	Canada	C	2005–2006	1	0	0	0	0	—	—	—	—	—	
David Savard	Canada	D	2011–2021	597	41	125	166	331	37	1	10	11	14	
Jordan Schroeder	United States	C	2017–2018	21	1	1	2	4	—	—	—	—	—	
Nick Schultz	Canada	D	2013–2014	9	0	1	1	4	2	0	0	0	0	
Darrel Scoville	Canada	D	2002–2004	10	0	1	1	10	—	—	—	—	—	
Lukas Sedlak	Czech Republic	C	2016–2019	162	15	12	27	56	2	0	0	0	0	
Alexander Selivanov	Russia	RW	2000–2001	59	8	11	19	38	—	—	—	—	—	
Sean Selmser	Canada	LW	2000–2001	1	0	0	0	5	—	—	—	—	—	
Tom Sestito	United States	LW	2007–2008; 2009–2011	13	2	2	4	64	—	—	—	—	—	
Cam Severson	Canada	LW	2005–2006	4	0	0	0	5	—	—	—	—	—	
Damon Severson*	Canada	D	2023–2026	208	23	62	85	143	—	—	—	—	—	
Jody Shelley	Canada	LW	2000–2008	380	11	18	29	1001	—	—	—	—	—	
Kole Sherwood	United States	RW	2018-2021	11	0	1	1	9	—	—	—	—	—	
Devin Shore	Canada	RW	2019–2020	6	1	1	2	0	2	0	0	0	0	
Cole Sillinger*	Canada	C	2021–2026	367	51	89	140	177	—	—	—	—	—	
Owen Sillinger	Canada	F	2024–2025	1	0	0	0	2	—	—	—	—	—	
Mike Sillinger	Canada	C	2001–2003	155	38	48	86	106	—	—	—	—	—	
Ben Simon	United States	LW	2005–2006	13	0	0	0	4	—	—	—	—	—	
Jack Skille	United States	RW	2013–2015	61	10	2	12	22	6	0	1	1	0	
Blake Sloan	United States	RW	2000–2002	74	3	7	10	59	—	—	—	—	—	
Brendan Smith*	Canada	D	2025–2026	15	0	2	2	11	—	—	—	—	—	
Jaroslav Spacek	Czech Republic	D	2001–2004	153	16	56	72	139	—	—	—	—	—	
Frederic St-Denis	Canada	D	2014–2015	4	0	1	1	0	—	—	—	—	—	
Kevin Stenlund	Sweden	C	2018-2022	71	11	9	20	22	2	1	0	1	0	
Anton Stralman	Sweden	D	2009–2011	124	7	45	52	59	—	—	—	—	—	
Radoslav Suchy	Slovakia	D	2005–2006	79	1	7	8	30	—	—	—	—	—	
Alexandr Svitov	Russia	C	2003–2007	105	9	17	26	161	—	—	—	—	—	
Stanislav Svozil	Czech Republic	D	2022–2023	2	0	1	1	2	—	—	—	—	—	
Billy Sweezey	United States	D	2022–2023	9	0	1	1	9	—	—	—	—	—	
Darryl Sydor	Canada	D	2003–2004	49	2	13	15	26	—	—	—	—	—	
Dick Tarnstrom	Sweden	D	2007–2008	19	2	7	9	12	—	—	—	—	—	
Alexandre Texier	France	C	2018-2024	201	34	45	79	82	18	2	5	7	4	
Calvin Thurkauf	Switzerland	F	2019–2020	3	0	0	0	0	—	—	—	—	—	
Mattias Timander	Sweden	D	2000–2002	154	6	16	22	68	—	—	—	—	—	
Ole-Kristian Tollefsen	Norway	D	2005–2009	145	4	6	10	273	—	—	—	—	—	
Raffi Torres	Canada	LW	2008–2010	111	31	20	51	55	4	0	2	2	2	
Corey Tropp	United States	RW	2013–2015	105	3	15	18	113	2	0	0	0	0	
T.J. Tynan	United States	C	2016–2017	3	0	0	0	0	—	—	—	—	—	
Dana Tyrell	Canada	C	2014–2016	3	0	0	0	0	—	—	—	—	—	
Fedor Tyutin	Russia	D	2008–2016	553	39	146	185	351	8	1	1	2	4	
R. J. Umberger	United States	C	2008–2014	445	120	130	250	200	8	3	1	4	2	
Scottie Upshall	Canada	RW	2010–2011	21	6	1	7	10	—	—	—	—	—	
Darren Van Impe	Canada	D	2002–2003	14	1	1	2	10	—	—	—	—	—	
James van Riemsdyk	United States	LW	2024–2025	71	16	20	36	23	—	—	—	—	—	
Thomas Vanek	Austria	LW	2017–2018	19	7	8	15	8	6	1	1	2	2	
Antoine Vermette	Canada	C	2008–2012	241	61	91	152	112	4	0	0	0	10	
Jakub Voracek	Czech Republic	RW	2008–2011; 2021–2023	331	46	156	202	140	4	0	1	1	8	
Dmitri Voronkov*	Russia	LW	2023–2026	211	58	55	113	166	—	—	—	—	—	
David Vyborny	Czech Republic	RW	2000–2008	543	113	204	317	228	—	—	—	—	—	
Derrick Walser	Canada	D	2001–2004; 2006–2007	91	8	21	29	56	—	—	—	—	—	
Alexander Wennberg	Sweden	C	2014–2020	415	40	161	201	85	22	4	4	8	4	
Zach Werenski*	United States	D	2016–2026	642	135	330	465	164	29	4	9	13	15	All Star, 2018
Duvie Westcott	Canada	D	2001–2008	201	11	36	47	14	—	—	—	—	—	
Ray Whitney	Canada	LW	2000–2003	151	45	95	140	36	—	—	—	—	—	Captain, 2002–2003, All Star, 2003
Jack Williams	United States	F	2024–2025	1	0	0	0	0	—	—	—	—	—	
Jason Williams	Canada	RW	2008–2009	39	12	17	29	16	4	0	1	1	2	
Clay Wilson	United States	D	2007–2009	14	1	2	3	2	—	—	—	—	—	
Kyle Wilson	Canada	C	2010–2011	32	4	7	11	12	—	—	—	—	—	
James Wisniewski	United States	D	2011–2015	209	26	95	121	147	6	0	2	2	10	
Miles Wood*	United States	LW	2025–2026	54	8	6	14	26	—	—	—	—	—	
Tyler Wright	Canada	C	2000–2006	309	57	51	108	436	—	—	—	—	—	
Mike York	United States	LW	2008–2009	1	0	0	0	0	—	—	—	—	—	
Egor Zamula*	Russia	D	2025–2026	20	0	2	2	0	—	—	—	—	—	
Nikolay Zherdev	Russia	RW	2003–2008	283	76	105	181	164	—	—	—	—	—	
