= Rick Nash =

Canadian ice hockey player (born 1984)

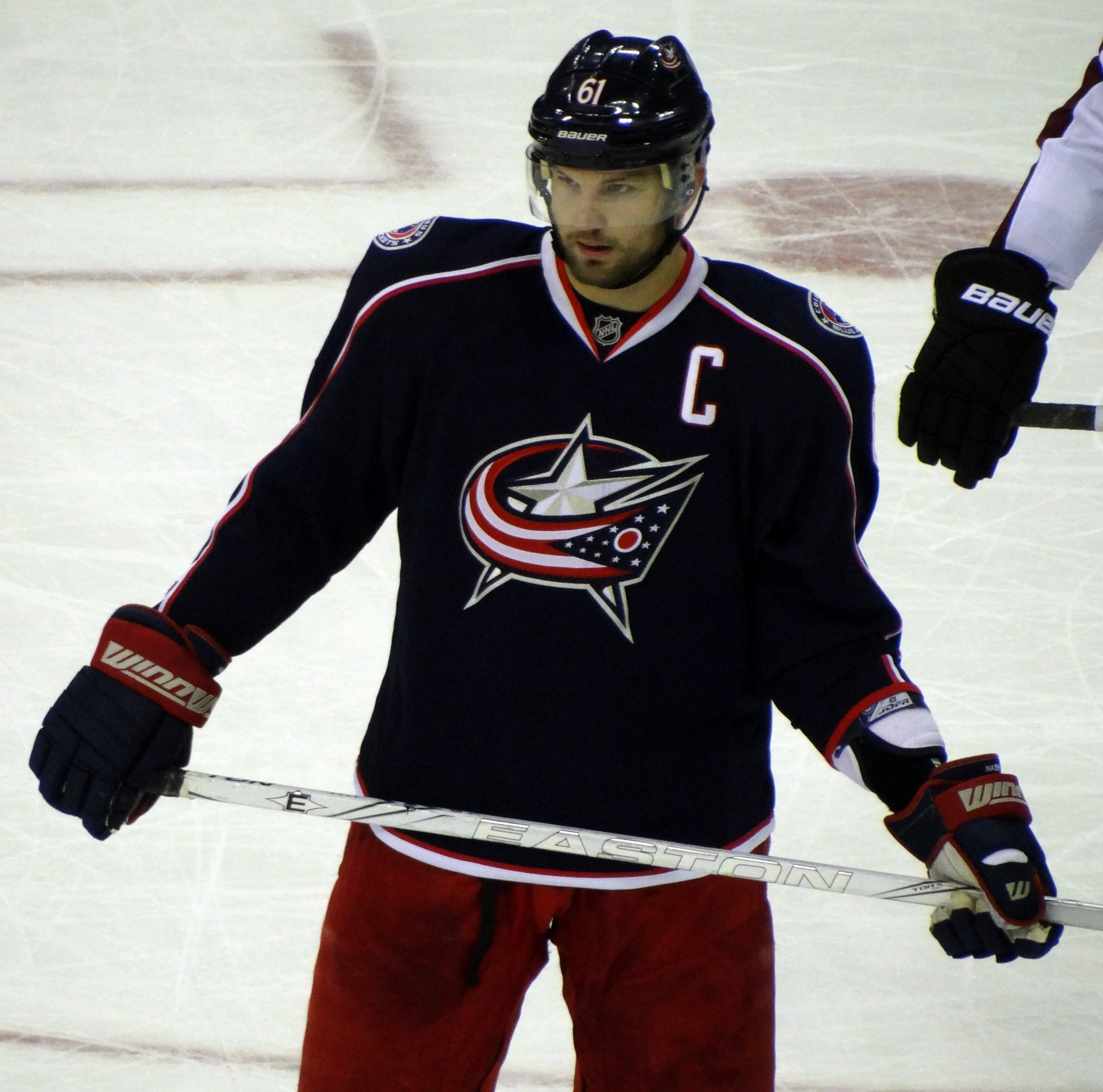
- Nash with the Columbus Blue Jackets in October 2011
- Born: June 16, 1984 (age 42) Brampton, Ontario, Canada
- Height: 6 ft 4 in (193 cm)
- Weight: 211 lb (96 kg; 15 st 1 lb)
- Position: Left wing
- Shot: Left
- Played for: Columbus Blue Jackets; HC Davos; New York Rangers; Boston Bruins
- National team: Canada
- NHL draft: 1st overall, 2002; Columbus Blue Jackets
- Playing career: 2002–2018

Richard Nash (born June 16, 1984) is a Canadian former professional ice hockey player who serves as the director of player development for the Columbus Blue Jackets of the National Hockey League (NHL). After being selected first overall in the 2002 NHL entry draft by Columbus, he played 15 seasons in the NHL for the Blue Jackets, New York Rangers and Boston Bruins, and was selected to play in six National Hockey League All-Star Games.

Prior to turning professional, Nash was a highly regarded prospect with the London Knights of the Ontario Hockey League (OHL) where he spent two seasons, earning the Emms Family Award in 2001 as the League's Rookie of the Year. He began his NHL career with the Blue Jackets immediately following his draft, in 2002–03, and was nominated for the Calder Trophy as NHL Rookie of the Year. In his second NHL season, Nash scored 41 goals to tie with Jarome Iginla and Ilya Kovalchuk as winners of the Maurice "Rocket" Richard Trophy as the NHL's leading goal-scorer. Nash is a six-time NHL All-Star and was also awarded the NHL Foundation Player Award in the 2008–09 season for his charitable work in the Columbus community. He is the Blue Jackets franchise career leader in goals, points, and games played. Widely considered the greatest Blue Jackets player of all time, Nash's number 61 was retired by the franchise in 2022.

Internationally, Nash has represented Team Canada, with whom he has won one gold and two silver medals at the World Championships, and two gold medals at the Winter Olympics in 2010 and 2014. Additionally, he has represented Canada at the 2002 World Junior Championships, helping the team to a silver medal, and also competed for Canada in the 2006 Winter Olympics in Turin.

== Background ==
Nash was raised in Brampton, Ontario, where he attended Brampton Centennial Secondary School. He played minor hockey in the Greater Toronto Hockey League (GTHL), where he caught the attention of OHL scouts in 1999. He played in the 1998 Quebec International Pee-Wee Hockey Tournament with the Toronto Marlboros minor ice hockey team.

== Playing career ==
As a member of the London Knights for two seasons in the OHL, Rick Nash began his major junior career with 66 points in his first year, receiving the Emms Family Award as the League's top rookie. The following season, he amassed 72 points in 54 games and was subsequently selected first overall in the 2002 NHL entry draft by the Columbus Blue Jackets.

=== Columbus Blue Jackets (2002–2012) ===
The first NHL contract for Nash was negotiated minutes before the signing deadline by Gord Kirke. It was the most lucrative contract for an NHL rookie at the time, valued at 1.2 million USD per season plus bonuses and incentives which ranged from 8 to US$12 million.

Joining the Blue Jackets in 2002–03, Nash debuted on October 10, 2002, and scored a goal in a 2–1 win over the Chicago Blackhawks. He was the eighth number one overall pick to score a goal in his first game and the first to do so in his draft year since Mario Lemieux in 1984. That season, Nash was nominated for the Calder Trophy as the NHL's top rookie, but lost to defenseman Barret Jackman of the St. Louis Blues. He would, however, join Jackman on the NHL All-Rookie Team.

In Nash's sophomore campaign, he improved his rookie goal total from 17 to 41, a career-high that tied Jarome Iginla and Ilya Kovalchuk for the Maurice "Rocket" Richard Trophy for most goals in the League. At 19 years of age, Nash was the youngest player in history to lead the League in goals. Recording 16 assists, Nash finished the year with 57 points.

During the 2004–05 NHL lockout, Nash played for HC Davos of the Swiss Nationalliga A (NLA). He scored 26 goals and 46 points in 44 games and added 11 more points (nine goals and two assists) in 15 games in the NLA playoffs. Joined by fellow NHL-er Joe Thornton, Davos went on to win the Swiss Championship, as well as the 2004 Spengler Cup.

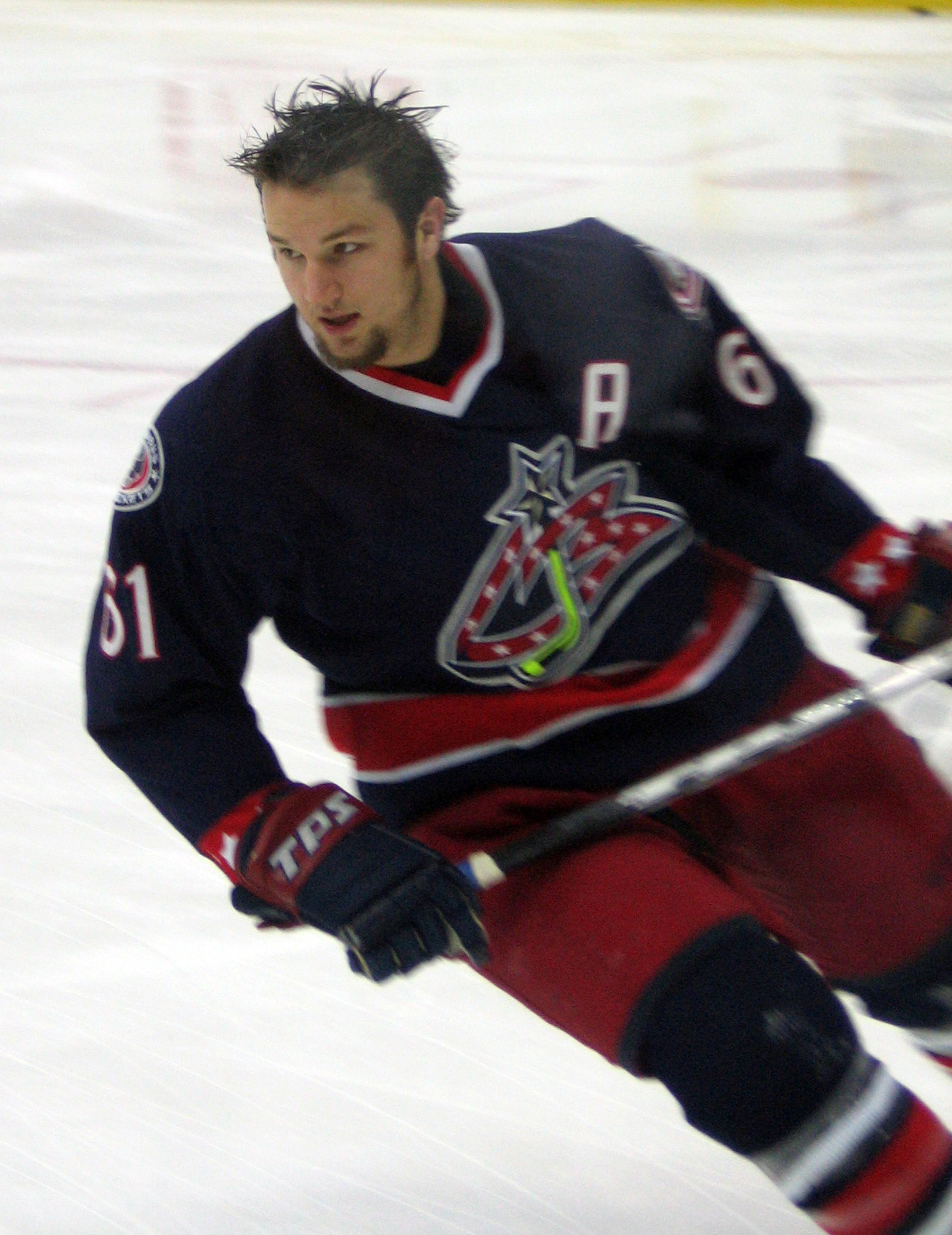
Nash with the Columbus Blue Jackets during the December 2006

With the NHL set to resume play in 2005–06, the Blue Jackets re-signed Nash to a five-year, $27 million contract. The deal saw his annual salary increase each year, with $3.5 million the first season and $7 million in the last season of the contract for a $5.4 million average salary. Knee and ankle injuries, however, sidelined Nash for much of the first half of the season. Missing 28 games total, Nash was still named to Team Canada for the 2006 Olympics, shortly after being activated from the injured reserve. Upon returning from a disappointing seventh-place finish in Turin, Nash completed the season at a point-per-game pace with 54 points in 54 games.

In 2006–07, Nash matched his sophomore points total with 57, and was named to the Western Conference All-Star Team for the second time in his career. He was Columbus' lone representative both times. Nash scored the game-winning goal in the West win.

The following season, on January 17, 2008, Nash scored what many commentators called the "goal of the year" in the final minute versus the Phoenix Coyotes. Breaking a tied score, Nash deked around two defenders and the goaltender to score the eventual game-winner. Later, at the end of the season, the goal was nominated for an ESPY Award in the category of Best Play. Selected to his third All-Star Game in 2008 that season, Nash scored the quickest goal in All-Star Game history, just 12 seconds in and ended the game with a hat-trick.

Completing the season with 38 goals and 69 points, Nash nearly matched his personal best goals total and set a career high for points and assists. Shortly before the end of the season, on March 12, 2008, Nash was also named the fifth captain in Blue Jackets history, replacing the recently traded Adam Foote.

In the off-season, in May 2008, Nash was named the cover athlete and spokesman for the NHL 2K9 video game. Going into the 2008–09 campaign, the Blue Jackets had gone without a playoff appearance in franchise history. Led by the newly appointed captain Nash and bolstered by rookie goaltender Steve Mason, the Blue Jackets finished the season as the seventh seed in the Western Conference to earn a post-season berth against division-rival the Detroit Red Wings. The series was preceded by an 8–2 rout over the Red Wings on March 7, 2009, a game in which Nash scored three unassisted goals. According to the Columbus Dispatch, citing the Elias Sports Bureau, the last player to score three goals unassisted was Maurice Richard (who scored four) against the New York Rangers at Madison Square Garden on March 14, 1948. Despite the convincing victory late in the season, the Blue Jackets were swept by the Red Wings in four games.

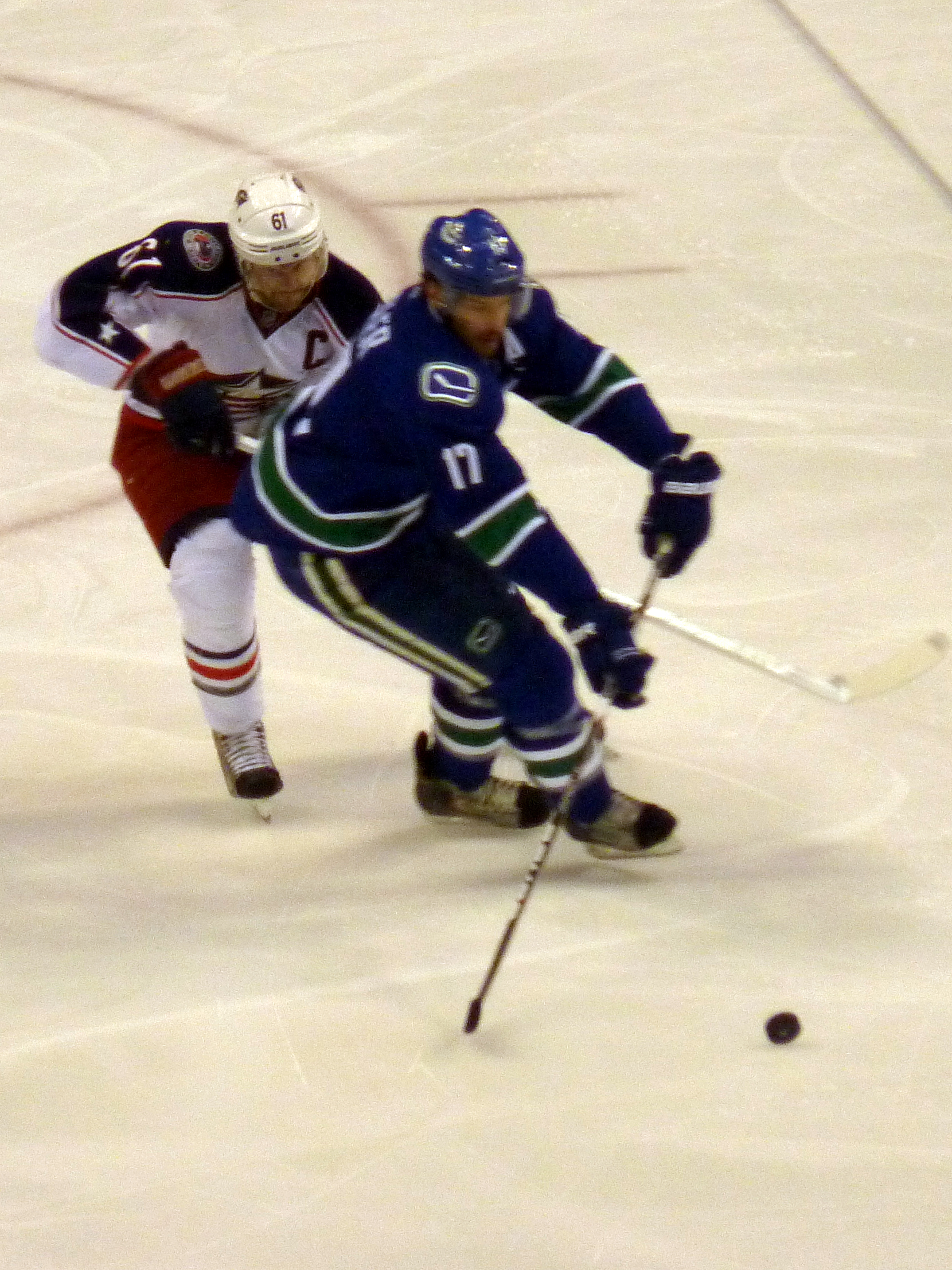
Nash (left) battling with Ryan Kesler for puck possession in November 2011

In addition to leading the Blue Jackets to the playoffs, Nash had a career season with 79 points, in addition to scoring 40 goals for the first time since 2003–04. In the off-season, on July 3, 2009, Nash signed an eight-year contract extension with the Blue Jackets worth $62.4 million set to take effect in 2010–11.

As the 2011–12 season began to unfold, Columbus recorded a dismal 2–12–1 record, the worst start to an NHL season by any team in 19 years. With the team struggling, rumors began circulating that the Blue Jackets were contemplating trading Nash as a solution to their on-ice woes. While Blue Jackets General Manager Scott Howson stated publicly that he had had no discussions regarding a Nash deal, other teams had indeed inquired about his availability. When asked about it, Nash stated that if the franchise felt it could improve itself by dealing him, he would be willing to waive his no-trade clause in order to get the deal done. Though Howson had previously maintained that he had no intention of trading Nash, two weeks before the trade deadline, he stated in the press that the team was open to all options and they were willing to listen to trade proposals for Nash, despite not actively shopping him. Speculation was that in return for Nash the Blue Jackets would ask for a top six forward, a top prospect and a first-round draft pick.

Trade speculation continued on into the summer with no deal imminent. While Howson claimed he merely wanted to receive "market value" in any deal for Nash, there was speculation that his asking price was too high for many rival NHL GMs to consider. Columbus eventually found a trade partner in the New York Rangers. Nash, along with Steven Delisle and a conditional third-round pick in the 2013 NHL entry draft, were traded to the Rangers for Artem Anisimov, Brandon Dubinsky, Tim Erixon and a 2013 first-round draft pick.

=== New York Rangers (2012–2018) ===
Nash signed a contract to play with HC Davos again during the 2012–13 NHL lockout. In late September 2012, while playing for Davos, Nash injured his shoulder and left the game.

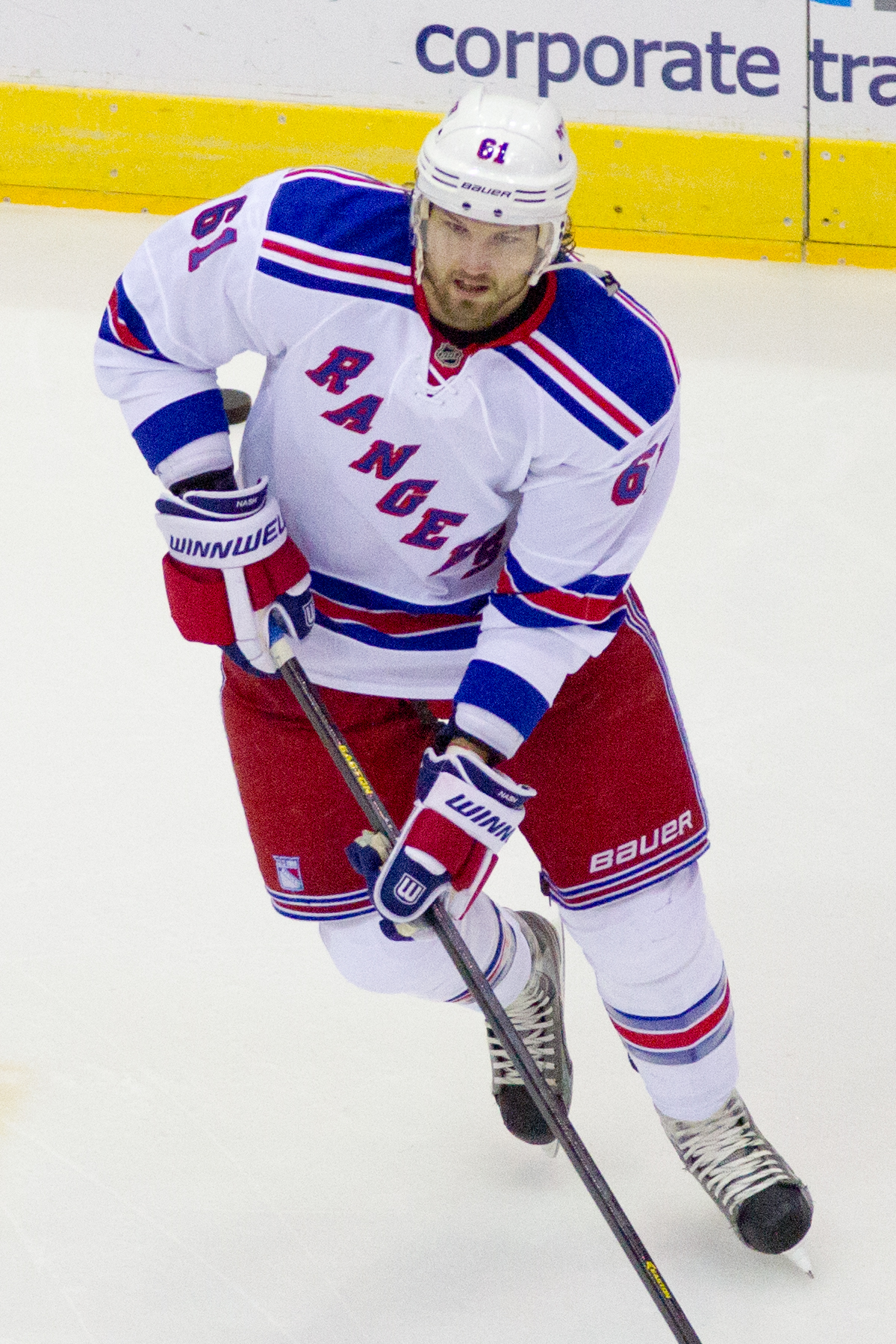
Nash with the New York Rangers in March 2013.

Nash had a successful first regular season with the Rangers, scoring 21 goals and 21 assists for 42 points in 44 games played in the lockout-shortened 2012–13 season. However, in the playoffs, Nash underwhelmed with only one goal and four assists in 12 playoff games.

Nash opened the 2013–14 season well, with three assists in two games. But on October 8, 2013, in a game against the San Jose Sharks, Nash suffered a concussion from a hit by Brad Stuart, which forced him to miss 17 games. On November 21, Nash scored his first goal of the season in a 3–2 win against the Dallas Stars. He would finish the season with a solid goal total of 26 in 65 games, but with only 13 assists, his 39 points tied a career low. Nash struggled mightily in the playoffs for the second straight year, scoring only three goals in 25 playoff games. Despite his low offensive production, however, he was solid defensively throughout, and the Rangers reached the Stanley Cup Final, ultimately losing in five games to the Los Angeles Kings in a series in which all the games were close decisions.

Nash had a superstar season in 2014–15 scoring a career-high 42 goals (third in the NHL behind Steven Stamkos with 43 and Alexander Ovechkin with 53) and 27 assists. Nash's production also improved during the 2015 playoffs, as he scored five goals and nine assists (14 points) in 19 games as the Rangers fell to the Tampa Bay Lightning in a hard-fought seven-game Eastern Conference Finals series.

Nash's performance declined at the start of the 2015–16 season as he struggled to recapture his scoring pace from the previous season. This was further exacerbated by muscle spasms that caused Nash to miss 22 games. Despite being involved in trade rumors, few teams seemed to be interested in Rick Nash and his $7.9 million cap hit. Nash scored a career-low 15 goals, going with 21 assists for a career-low 36 points. He then recorded two goals and two assists in New York's five-game opening round loss to the Pittsburgh Penguins in the 2016 Stanley Cup playoffs.

On October 11, 2016, Nash was named an alternate captain for the New York Rangers, joining Daniel Girardi, Marc Staal, and Derek Stepan along with captain Ryan McDonagh. On November 8, 2016, Nash scored his 400th goal in a 5–3 loss against the Vancouver Canucks. Nash again missed several games during the 2016–17 season, this time with a nagging groin injury. He still managed to score 23 goals and 15 assists for 38 points, in 67 games. Nash's production continued to improve during the 2017 Stanley Cup playoffs. He recorded two goals and one assist in the Rangers six-game opening-round victory over the Montreal Canadiens.

On October 26, 2017, Nash skated in his 1,000th NHL career game, which resulted in a 5–2 win over the Arizona Coyotes. He became the 312th player in NHL history to play at least 1,000 career games.

=== Boston Bruins (2018) ===
During the 2017–18 season, the Rangers struggled relative to their results from past seasons. On February 8, 2018, the team released a letter to fans that signaled intentions to begin a rebuild, to which rumors of a Nash trade began to swirl, as he was in the last year of his contract. On February 25, 2018, one day before the trade deadline, Nash was traded to the Boston Bruins in exchange for Ryan Spooner, Matt Beleskey, prospect Ryan Lindgren, a 2018 first-round pick (which became Jacob Bernard-Docker), and a 2019 seventh-round pick (which became Massimo Rizzo). Rick Nash's first goal as a Bruin, and his 800th career point, came on February 27, 2018, in a 4–3 overtime Bruins home ice win over the Carolina Hurricanes. Nash would go on to play 23 games for the Bruins, and suffered a concussion in a game against the Tampa Bay Lightning, after a hit from Cedric Paquette.

On January 11, 2019, at age 34, due to unresolved symptoms from a concussion sustained in March 2018, Nash was forced to retire from professional hockey after playing 1,060 career games spanning over 15 seasons.

== International play ==
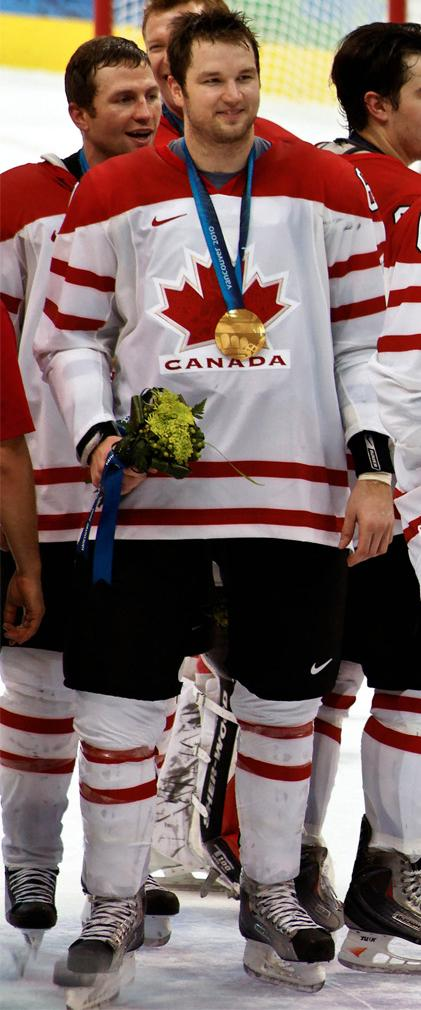
- Rick Nash with a gold medal during the 2010 Winter Olympics.

Medal record

Representing Canada

Men's ice hockey

Olympic Winter Games
Gold medal – first place	2010 Vancouver	
Gold medal – first place	2014 Sochi	

World Championships
Gold medal – first place	2007 Russia	
Silver medal – second place	2005 Austria	
Silver medal – second place	2008 Canada	

World Junior Championships
Silver medal – second place	2002 Czech Republic	

In Nash's second junior season, he was chosen to play for Team Canada's junior squad in the 2002 World Junior Championships, scoring three points in a silver medal effort.

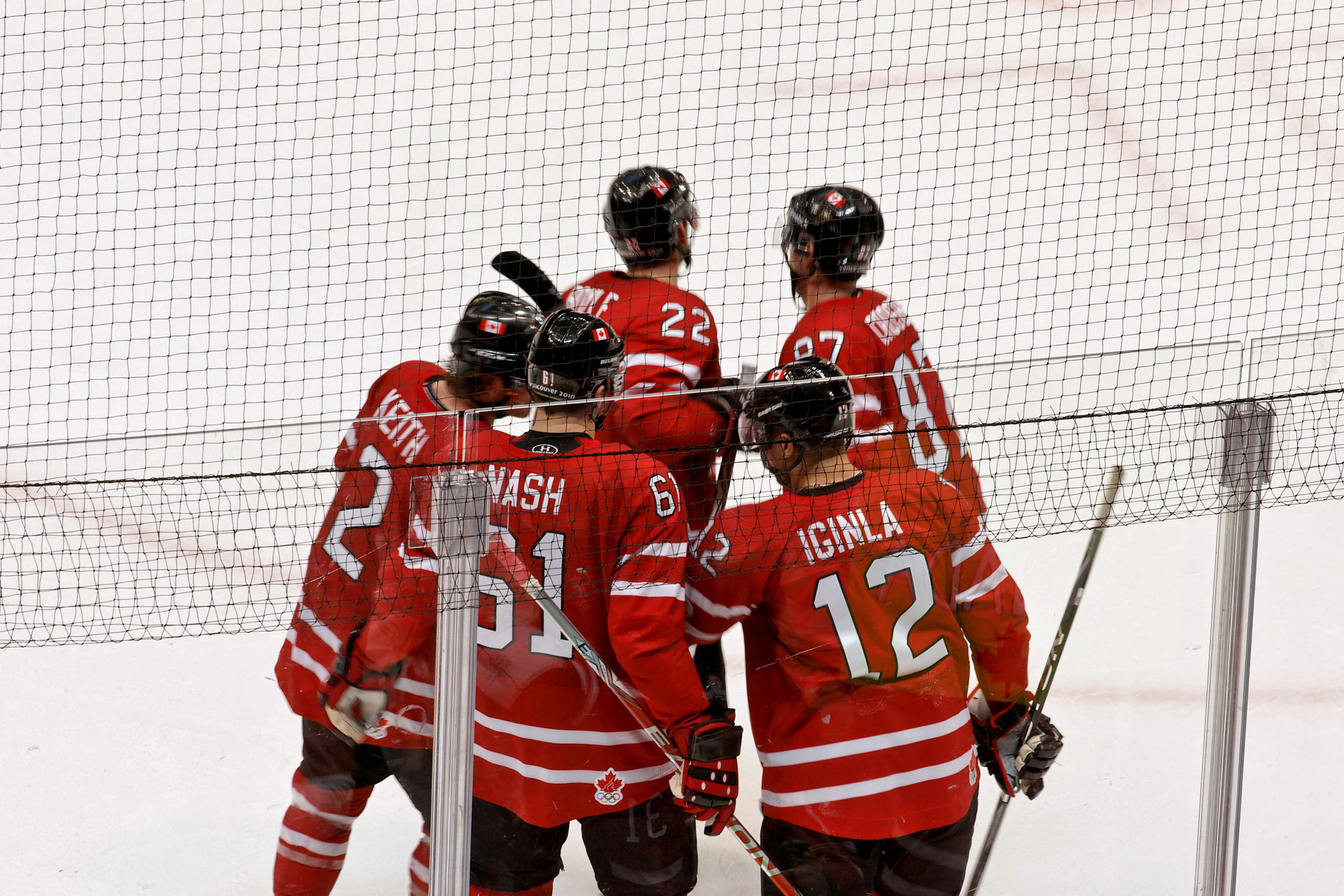
Rick Nash (#61, center) celebrates a goal against the United States during the 2010 Winter Olympics.

Nash would make his senior international debut for Team Canada at the 2005 World Championship, leading the tournament in goals while earning his second silver medal.

In 2006, shortly after returning from an injury, he was selected to play on Team Canada's Olympic team, but managed just one point in a disappointing seventh-place finish.

The following year, Nash captured his first gold medal with Team Canada at the 2007 World Championship in a 4–2 victory over Finland in Moscow. Scoring two goals in the gold medal game against Finland and 11 points total, Nash was named to the tournament All-Star Team and earned MVP honours.

Nash appeared in his third World Championship in 2008, but failed to repeat as gold medal champion with Canada, earning silver. In the championship game against Russia, Nash attempted to clear the puck in overtime, but accidentally shot it over the glass, resulting a delay of game penalty. On the powerplay, Russia capitalized, defeating Canada 5–4. Despite his misplay, Nash was named to the tournament All-Star Team for the second consecutive year, finishing with 13 points.

On December 30, 2009, Nash was selected to play for Team Canada at the 2010 Winter Olympics in Vancouver. After starting the tournament on Sidney Crosby's wing, he was switched to a line with Mike Richards and Jonathan Toews, who was named Best Forward. Nash earned his first Olympic medal in the tournament as Team Canada went on to win gold.

Nash was named captain of Team Canada for the 2011 IIHF World Championship. Canada finished fifth in the tournament.

Rick Nash won his second gold medal with Team Canada at the 2014 Winter Olympics.

== Career statistics ==
=== Regular season and playoffs ===
			Regular season					Playoffs
Season	Team	League	GP	G	A	Pts	PIM	GP	G	A	Pts	PIM
1999–00	Toronto Marlboros AAA	GTHL	34	61	54	115	34	—	—	—	—	—
1999–00	Milton Merchants	OPJHL	1	0	1	1	0	—	—	—	—	—
2000–01	London Knights	OHL	58	31	35	66	56	4	3	3	6	8
2001–02	London Knights	OHL	54	32	40	72	88	12	10	9	19	21
2002–03	Columbus Blue Jackets	NHL	74	17	22	39	78	—	—	—	—	—
2003–04	Columbus Blue Jackets	NHL	80	41	16	57	87	—	—	—	—	—
2004–05	HC Davos	NLA	44	27	20	47	83	15	9	2	11	26
2005–06	Columbus Blue Jackets	NHL	54	31	23	54	51	—	—	—	—	—
2006–07	Columbus Blue Jackets	NHL	75	27	30	57	73	—	—	—	—	—
2007–08	Columbus Blue Jackets	NHL	80	38	31	69	95	—	—	—	—	—
2008–09	Columbus Blue Jackets	NHL	78	40	39	79	52	4	1	2	3	2
2009–10	Columbus Blue Jackets	NHL	76	33	34	67	58	—	—	—	—	—
2010–11	Columbus Blue Jackets	NHL	75	32	34	66	34	—	—	—	—	—
2011–12	Columbus Blue Jackets	NHL	82	30	29	59	40	—	—	—	—	—
2012–13	HC Davos	NLA	17	12	6	18	8	—	—	—	—	—
2012–13	New York Rangers	NHL	44	21	21	42	26	12	1	4	5	0
2013–14	New York Rangers	NHL	65	26	13	39	36	25	3	7	10	8
2014–15	New York Rangers	NHL	79	42	27	69	36	19	5	9	14	4
2015–16	New York Rangers	NHL	60	15	21	36	30	5	2	2	4	4
2016–17	New York Rangers	NHL	67	23	15	38	26	12	3	2	5	4
2017–18	New York Rangers	NHL	60	18	10	28	24	—	—	—	—	—
2017–18	Boston Bruins	NHL	11	3	3	6	4	12	3	2	5	10
NHL totals			1,060	437	368	805	750	89	18	28	46	32

=== International ===
Year	Team	Event	GP	G	A	Pts	PIM
2001	Canada Ontario	U17	6	6	2	8	8
2002	Canada	WJC	7	1	2	3	2
2005	Canada	WC	9	9	6	15	8
2006	Canada	OLY	6	0	1	1	10
2007	Canada	WC	9	6	5	11	4
2008	Canada	WC	9	6	7	13	6
2010	Canada	OLY	7	2	3	5	0
2011	Canada	WC	7	2	3	5	2
2014	Canada	OLY	6	0	1	1	2
Junior totals			13	7	4	11	10
Senior totals			53	25	26	51	32

== Awards ==
OHL

- OHL All-Rookie Team – 2001
- Emms Family Award (rookie of the year) – 2001

CHL

- CHL All-Rookie Team – 2001

NHL

- NHL All-Rookie Team – 2003
- Maurice "Rocket" Richard Trophy – 2004 (shared with Ilya Kovalchuk and Jarome Iginla)
- NHL All-Star Game appearance – 2004, 2007, 2008, 2009, 2011, 2015
- NHL Foundation Player Award – 2009
- #61 retired by the Columbus Blue Jackets - 2022
- NHL 2K cover athlete - 2009

NLA

- Best Swiss League forward – 2004–05

International

- World Championships gold medal – 2007
- World Championships MVP – 2007
- World Championships All-Star Team – 2007, 2008
- Gold medal – 2010 Winter Olympic Games
- Gold medal – 2014 Winter Olympic Games

Other

- Best Play ESPY Award nomination – 2008

== See also ==
- List of Columbus Blue Jackets players
- List of NHL players with 1,000 games played

Awards and achievements
Preceded by Ilya Kovalchuk	NHL first overall draft pick 2002	Succeeded by Marc-André Fleury
Preceded by Pascal Leclaire	Columbus Blue Jackets first-round draft pick 2002	Succeeded by Nikolay Zherdev
Preceded by Milan Hejduk	Winner of the Maurice "Rocket" Richard Trophy; 2004; With: Jarome Iginla and Ilya Kovalchuk	Succeeded by Jonathan Cheechoo
Preceded by Adam Foote	Columbus Blue Jackets captain 2008–2012	Succeeded by Nick Foligno
